= National Register of Historic Places listings in Copiah County, Mississippi =

Location of Copiah County in Mississippi

This is a list of the National Register of Historic Places listings in Copiah County, Mississippi.

This is intended to be a complete list of the properties and districts on the National Register of Historic Places in Copiah County, Mississippi, United States. Latitude and longitude coordinates are provided for many National Register properties and districts; these locations may be seen together in a map.

There are 35 properties and districts listed on the National Register in the county. Another 2 properties were once listed but have been removed.

This National Park Service list is complete through NPS recent listings posted March 14, 2025.

== Current listings ==
| | Name on the Register | Image | Date listed | Location | City or town | Description |
|---|---|---|---|---|---|---|
| 1 | Ailes House | | April 9, 1991 (#91000420) | Rhymes Rd. near its junction with Mississippi Highway 27; 32°01′30″N 90°22′15″W | Crystal Springs | |
| 2 | Alford-Little House | Alford-Little House | October 19, 1982 (#82000573) | South of Georgetown off Mississippi Highway 27; 31°47′35″N 90°08′45″W | Georgetown | |
| 3 | Bayou Pierre Bridge | | June 10, 2005 (#05000565) | Mississippi Highway 18; 32°00′10″N 90°41′23″W | Carpenter | |
| 4 | Brewer Place | | January 19, 2016 (#15000983) | 3101 Utica Rd. 32°00′08″N 90°22′31″W | Crystal Springs | |
| 5 | Carpenter United Methodist Church | | June 28, 1996 (#96000705) | Carpenter Rd., 1.1 miles north of its junction with Mississippi Highway 18; 32°02′08″N 90°40′53″W | Utica | |
| 6 | Cherry Grove | | August 10, 1990 (#90001224) | Old U.S. Route 51, north of its junction with Mississippi Highway 27; 32°02′32″N 90°19′20″W | Crystal Springs | |
| 7 | Cook House | Cook House | December 8, 1983 (#83003941) | 222 Extension St. 31°51′32″N 90°23′48″W | Hazlehurst | |
| 8 | George Washington Copley House | | March 1, 1996 (#96000181) | 210 Copley St. 31°59′07″N 90°21′43″W | Crystal Springs | |
| 9 | Robert L. Covington House | Robert L. Covington House | March 1, 1984 (#84002139) | 240 S. Extension St. 31°51′23″N 90°23′50″W | Hazlehurst | Designed by architect George Franklin Barber |
| 10 | Crystal Springs Historic District | | March 14, 1997 (#97000236) | Roughly bounded by Independence, Pearl, Newton, and Marion Sts. 31°59′14″N 90°21′28″W | Crystal Springs | |
| 11 | Isaac Newton Ellis House | Isaac Newton Ellis House | November 2, 1987 (#87001914) | 258 S. Extension St. 31°51′19″N 90°23′49″W | Hazlehurst | Designed by architect George Franklin Barber |
| 12 | Gallman Historic District | | March 31, 1986 (#86000832) | Roughly U.S. Route 51 and Church St. 31°55′53″N 90°23′27″W | Gallman | |
| 13 | Gatesville Bridge | | November 16, 1988 (#88002482) | Spans the Pearl River on a county road east of Gatesville; 31°59′46″N 90°13′26″W | Gatesville | Extends into Simpson County |
| 14 | Georgetown Methodist Church | | January 19, 2016 (#15000984) | 1002 Lane Ave. 31°52′19″N 90°09′46″W | Georgetown | |
| 15 | Hargrave House | | April 5, 1993 (#91001465) | Mississippi Highway 28, 14 miles west of Hazlehurst; 31°45′04″N 90°34′55″W | Hazlehurst | |
| 16 | Hazlehurst Historic District | Hazlehurst Historic District | November 5, 1998 (#98001336) | Roughly bounded by S. Extension, Georgetown, Gallatin, and Monticello Sts. 31°51′40″N 90°23′41″W | Hazlehurst | |
| 17 | Homochitto River Bridge | | November 16, 1988 (#88002491) | Spans the Homochitto River on a county road 31°42′48″N 90°40′01″W | Hazlehurst | |
| 18 | Charles Morris Huber House | | November 10, 1994 (#94001306) | 199 N. Jackson St. 31°59′29″N 90°21′11″W | Crystal Springs | |
| 19 | Illinois Central Railroad Passenger Depot | Illinois Central Railroad Passenger Depot | March 1, 1996 (#96000182) | 138 N. Ragsdale Ave. 31°51′39″N 90°23′39″W | Hazlehurst | |
| 20 | Dr. William Little House | | March 4, 1993 (#93000143) | 1022 Collier St. 31°41′52″N 90°23′47″W | Wesson | |
| 21 | Marchetti Farm | | March 1, 1996 (#96000183) | 134 Dale Dr. 31°51′09″N 90°24′11″W | Hazlehurst | |
| 22 | Mississippi Mills Packing and Shipping Rooms | Mississippi Mills Packing and Shipping Rooms | March 1, 1996 (#96000185) | 2058 U.S. Route 51; 31°42′05″N 90°23′50″W | Wesson | |
| 23 | Mount Hope | | March 21, 1985 (#85000616) | Off Route 2 across from Mt. Hope Cemetery; 31°52′43″N 90°34′38″W | Hazlehurst | |
| 24 | Old Wesson Public School Building | | October 16, 1980 (#80002235) | Off U.S. Route 51; 31°42′08″N 90°23′22″W | Wesson | |
| 25 | C.H. Parsons House | | September 7, 1984 (#84002140) | 208 W. Georgetown St. 31°59′18″N 90°21′33″W | Crystal Springs | |
| 26 | Pearl River Bridge on Mississippi Highway 28 | | June 10, 2005 (#05000566) | Mississippi Highway 28; 31°52′31″N 90°08′17″W | Georgetown | |
| 27 | Pleasant Valley Methodist Church | | August 1, 1996 (#96000703) | Pleasant Valley Rd., 0.8 miles east of its junction with Mississippi Highway 28; 31°45′38″N 90°33′13″W | Hazlehurst | |
| 28 | Dr. Robert W. Rea House | | November 1, 1996 (#96001267) | 1034 Church St. 31°42′01″N 90°23′53″W | Wesson | |
| 29 | James Samuel Rea House | | March 1, 1996 (#96000184) | 1193 U.S. Route 51; 31°41′53″N 90°24′04″W | Wesson | |
| 30 | Tabernacle Methodist Church | Tabernacle Methodist Church | June 28, 1996 (#96000704) | Dentville Rd., 4.6 miles north of its junction with Mississippi Highway 28; 31°54′37″N 90°28′17″W | Hazlehurst | |
| 31 | US Post Office-Crystal Springs | US Post Office-Crystal Springs | March 18, 1993 (#80004887) | 224 E. Marion St. 31°59′09″N 90°21′25″W | Crystal Springs | |
| 32 | US Post Office-Hazlehurst | US Post Office-Hazlehurst | March 18, 1993 (#80004886) | 130 Caldwell Dr. 31°51′41″N 90°23′44″W | Hazlehurst | |
| 33 | Jenkins H. Welch House | | June 30, 1988 (#88000972) | ½ mile north of Mississippi Highway 28 on Dentville Rd. 31°52′50″N 90°24′57″W | Hazlehurst | |
| 34 | Wesson Presbyterian Church | | January 14, 2015 (#14001151) | 1022 E. Railroad Ave. 31°41′56″N 90°23′50″W | Wesson | |
| 35 | Col. William James Willing House | | July 10, 1992 (#92000835) | 272 S. Jackson St. 31°58′59″N 90°21′28″W | Crystal Springs | |

== Former listings ==
| | Name on the Register | Image | Date listed | Date removed | Location | City or town | Description |
|---|---|---|---|---|---|---|---|
| 1 | Rockport Bridge | | November 16, 1988 (#88002414) | December 15, 1999 | Spans Pearl River on CR S of Georgetown | Georgetown | Destroyed by an overweight truck on February 3, 1999 |
| 2 | Wesson Hotel | | October 10, 1972 (#72000691) | May 15, 1987 | Railroad Ave. and Spring St. | Wesson | Demolished by owner in 1982 |

== See also ==
- List of National Historic Landmarks in Mississippi
- National Register of Historic Places listings in Mississippi
