= Bruce Bailey =

Bruce Bailey may refer to:

- Bruce A. Bailey (born 1937), English architectural historian, archivist and librarian
- Bruce M. Bailey (1935–2022), American author and humorist
- Bruce Bailey (rugby union)
