= William James Willing =

Mississippi lawyer and politician

William James Willing Jr. (1839? – January 15, 1909) was a lawyer and politician in Mississippi. He lived in Crystal Springs, Mississippi and represented Copiah County in the Mississippi House of Representatives in 1870. He resigned his seat in 1872.

In 1875, he wrote to Mississippi governor Adelbert Ames about threats of violence and a campaign of intimidation from Democrats and their "clubs" in the state, including White Leaguers.

The historic Colonel William James Willing House in Crystal Springs, Mississippi was built by his father of the same name, and is named for him. It hosted prominent guests including Jefferson Davis.
