= Mississippi Mills (Wesson, Mississippi) =

Coordinates: 31.70432°N 90.39752°W

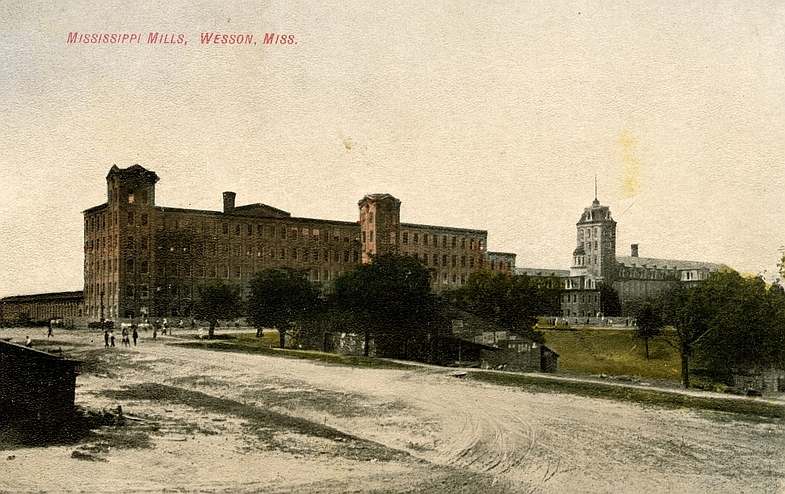
Mississippi Mills textile complex, c. 1900

Mississippi Mills was a cotton and wool textile manufacturing complex that operated in Wesson, Mississippi, during the latter half of the 19th century. By 1892, Mississippi Mills was described as the largest industry of its kind in the South.

Absentee management and financial difficulties contributed to the mills' decline. The complex closed in 1910 and was dismantled several years later.

== Establishment ==
In 1864, during the American Civil War, a textile mill in Bankston, Mississippi, was burned by Union forces because it supplied the Confederate Army. In 1866, the Bankston mill owner, Colonel James Madison Wesson, relocated to Copiah County, Mississippi, and established a new textile mill, known as the Mississippi Manufacturing Company. The town of Wesson developed around the mill.

Because of Reconstruction-era financial problems, Mississippi Manufacturing Co. was bankrupt by 1871. Captain William Oliver and John T. Hardy bought the mill from Col. Wesson, but it burned in 1873. Oliver convinced Mississippi's largest landowner and cotton producer, Edmund Richardson, to become a partner in building a more modern textile mill of brick, to reduce the fire hazard created by using wood-fired power in combination with flammable cotton fibers. Richardson bought out Hardy and assumed a controlling interest in the enterprise, which became known as Mississippi Mills, with Edmund Richardson as president and William Oliver as general manager.

== Peak years ==
The textile complex consisted of four mills that were built over a period of 21 years, from 1873 to 1894. By 1882, electric lights had been installed to illuminate the textile buildings. When all four mills were completed, they covered several city blocks, and one was five stories high.

Under the leadership of William Oliver, from 1873 to 1891, business at Mississippi Mills thrived because of his interest in the mill workers and community affairs. By the late 1880s, Mississippi Mills employed:

...1,200 workers to operate 25,000 cotton spindles, 26 sets of woolen machinery, and 800 looms in the production of 4,000,000 yards of cotton goods, 2,000,000 yards of woolen goods and 320,000 pounds of yarn and twine annually.

Mississippi Mills produced a great variety of cotton and woolen products that included:

...cassimeres, jeans, doeskins, tweeds, linseys, flannels, wool and cotton knitting yarn, cotton rope, cotton warp, yarn, cottonades, flannelettes, gingham plaids, cheviots, checks, plaids, stripes, hickory, brown sheeting, shirting, drilling, eight ounce osnaburgs, ticking for feathers and mattresses, sewing thread, sewing twine for bags and awnings, wrapping twine, honey comb towels, awning, and balmoral skirts.

== Decline ==
Following the deaths of Edmund Richardson, in 1886, and William Oliver, in 1891, the fortunes of Mississippi Mills began to decline. John Richardson, who succeeded his father as president, brought in a general manager from the North, while he himself moved to New Orleans, Louisiana. Mississippi Mills was further handicapped by the Panic of 1893, increased transportation costs, a drop in cotton prices, and labor disputes. In 1906, Mississippi Mills was forced into receivership and the facility closed in 1910. The buildings stood vacant until they were dismantled in 1920.

A single building, the Mississippi Mills Packing and Shipping Rooms facility, was retained during dismantling of the textile complex. In 1996, the building was listed on the National Register of Historic Places listings in Copiah County, Mississippi.
