= Coars Springs, Mississippi =

Coars Springs
- Ghost town
- Location within Mississippi Location within the United States
- Coordinates: 31°53′51″N 90°16′55″W
- Country: United States
- State: Mississippi
- County: Copiah
- Elevation: 351 ft (107 m)
- Time zone: UTC-6 (Central (CST))
  - Summer (DST): UTC-5 (CDT)
- GNIS feature ID: 708017

Coars Springs is a ghost town in Copiah County, Mississippi, United States. Once a thriving settlement and the first county seat in the early 1800s, Coars Springs was bypassed by the railroad and finally abandoned. In the 21st century, the site has been reclaimed by forest.

== History ==
Coars Springs was developed by European-American settlers about 5 mi (8.0 km) east of the present-day city of Hazlehurst, on the north bank of Copiah Creek. The town was likely named after the "Coars", a founding family.

When Copiah County was established in 1823, Coars Springs was designated as the first county seat. The following year, Simpson County was formed out of part of Copiah County, and the county seat was moved to Gallatin, a few miles west of Hazlehurst.

Coars Springs was a center of trade in the county. It was also popular as a health resort because of the springs. It had a hotel and three or four stores. The first probate and orphan's court was held there.

After the town was bypassed during the building of the railways in the mid-1800s, its business declined and finally the town was abandoned and became defunct.
