= Copiah Academy =

Segregation academy in Mississippi

Location
- 1144 East Gallman Road; Gallman, Mississippi 39059; United States; 31°55′54″N 90°22′42″W

Information
- Founded: 1967
- Headmaster: Mitch Mitchell
- Teaching staff: 53.6 (FTE)
- Grades: Pre-Kindergarten-12
- Enrollment: 744 (including 49 pre-K) (2013-2014)
- Student to teacher ratio: 13.0
- Colors: Red and Blue
- Nickname: Colonels
- Yearbook: The Colonel
- Affiliations: Southern Association of Independent Schools, and Mississippi Association of Independent Schools
- Website: www.copiahedu.org

Copiah Academy is an independent, coeducational, school for students in grades K3-12. The Copiah Educational Foundation established the school in 1967 as a segregation academy. The school is located in Copiah County, near the unincorporated community of Gallman, Mississippi.

== Demographics ==
The demographic breakdown of the 695 K–12 students enrolled in 2013–2014:

- Native American/Alaskan – 0.3%
- Black – 1.2%
- Hispanic – 0.1%
- White – 98.4%

== History ==
Copiah Academy's first classes were held in 1967 in Hazlehurst, Mississippi, just a few miles south of its current location. In 1970 the school moved to its current location on a 30-acre site.

Copiah Academy began taking steps to achieve accreditation by the Mississippi Private School Association, an accreditation agency for segregation academics.

Although founded as a school for white students, Copiah Academy now claims that it is open to college-bound students of any race, color, creed, religion, gender, or ethnic origin, but as of the 2013–2014 school year, the student body was 98.4% non-Hispanic white in a county where the overall percentage of non-Hispanic white people was 44.9%. New students in grades 6–12 must be drug tested at their parents' expense before being admitted, and all students in grades 6–12 will be subjected to at least one random drug test per school year.

== Notable alumni ==
- Hunter Renfroe, baseball player

== See also ==
- List of private schools in Mississippi
