= Simpson County Courthouse =

Simpson County Courthouse may refer to:

- Simpson County Courthouse (Kentucky), Franklin, Kentucky
- Simpson County Courthouse (Mississippi), Mendenhall, Mississippi, listed on the National Register of Historic Places
