= Midway, Copiah County, Mississippi =

Midway, Mississippi
- Unincorporated community
- Location within Mississippi Location within the United States
- Coordinates: 31°43′01″N 90°33′23″W
- Country: United States
- State: Mississippi
- County: Copiah
- Elevation: 482 ft (147 m)
- Time zone: UTC-6 (Central (CST))
  - Summer (DST): UTC-5 (CDT)
- Area codes: 601 & 769
- GNIS feature ID: 673540

Midway, also known as Peetsville, is an unincorporated community in Copiah County, Mississippi, United States. Midway is located at the junction of Midway Road and Jackson-Liberty Road, 13.7 miles (22.0 km) southwest of Hazlehurst.

A post office operated under the name Peetsville from 1893 to 1905.
