= Ailes House =

Ailes House may refer to:

- Ailes House (Crystal Springs, Mississippi), listed on the NRHP in Mississippi
- William Ailes House, Natchez, Mississippi, listed on the NRHP in Mississippi
