= Print Matthews =

American activist

- Born: John Prentiss Matthews; August 27, 1840; Hazlehurst, Mississippi, U.S.
- Died: November 6, 1883 (aged 43); Hazlehurst, Mississippi, U.S.
- Spouse: Mary "Tine" Barlow
- Children: 2

John Prentiss "Print" Matthews (August 27, 1840 – November 6, 1883) was an American sheriff and social reformer of the Reconstruction era. An advocate for African American rights in Copiah County, Mississippi, he was murdered while voting in 1883 after defying the orders of local white supremacist Democrats, who told him not to vote.

== Education and family life ==
Matthews, best known by the nickname "Print", was born on August 27, 1840, near Hazlehurst, Mississippi, the seat of Copiah County.

== Career ==
Although his parents were wealthy and owned 35 slaves. Matthews supported the Union. During the American Civil War, most local whites supported the Confederacy.

After the war, Matthews ran a store and was elected the county sheriff. When Democrats regained power in the state government in 1875, Matthews helped organize the Independent Party in Copiah County, consisting of black and white farmers. However, in 1881, Democrats began night riding to intimidate African Americans and attempt to suppress their voting, and Matthews lost his bid for re-election by 84 votes, as Democrats claimed a mule had reached through a window and eaten all the ballots from Mt. Hope precinct, primarily African American and supportive of Matthews (although 2 blacks remained on the county council).

In 1883, the night rides grew worse, although the Independent Party slate only included one black. A black church was burned and a husband and wife murdered on October 26. The riders ordered voters not to vote for the Independent Party in the upcoming 1883 elections; and blacks and some whites even spent the night before the election in the woods for fear of further intimidation tactics.

== Death ==
The white Democratic leaders of Hazlehurst delivered a written ultimatum to Matthews, ordering him not to vote. When he persisted, the precinct captain, a white farmer named Erastus Benjamin Wheeler (1840-1900, nicknamed "Ras") who had an account at Matthews' store, reached inside a wooden box for a double-barreled shotgun and shot and killed Matthews at the polls.

The evening after his murder, Matthews' political enemies, organized in a local group known as the "Trail-Hold Club", gathered in the yard of his residence. They mocked and celebrated the killing. A mass meeting "resolved" that the Matthews family "shall keep out of politics in Copiah county" and some talked of having Wheeler run for governor. Wheeler was elected marshal of Hazlehurst, Meanwhile, the gravedigger who had helped bury Matthews on his own property was threatened and left town, as did the Matthews family (though some members including his then-15 year old son later returned).

=== Trial ===
After a special investigation, Wheeler was tried in May 1884. The New York Times covered the trial. The carefully chosen, all-white jury quickly returned a verdict of not guilty, much to the pleasure and expectation of the judge and the community. The jury posted a statement noting that if an "error" occurred, it was "one of the head, and not of the heart."

J.T. Dameron, a merchant, testified that he saw Ras Wheeler in a street car in the capital of Jackson on the 13th or 14 February. He said that Wheeler was talking in a low tone. He said; "Yes, old Hoar is coming down here on an investigation committee. If I get a crack at him I will kill him, too. I killed Print Matthews, or rather it was the Democratic party that did it. If it had not been for politics, I would not have done it; but it was politics that did it."

Ras Wheeler went on to have a successful political career in the state.

=== Legacy ===
Matthews was survived by his wife Mary "Tine" Barlow, whom he had married on June 6, 1862. Their son John Prentiss Matthews, Jr. carried on his father's principles and became a leader in Republican politics. President Benjamin Harrison made him postmaster of a town 130 miles away, Carrollton, Mississippi. On Christmas Day, 1890, local Democrats shot the 22 year old dead. Another son, Simon Matthews, became an activist in the People's Party during the 1890s, when a biracial coalition temporarily elected some positions, defeating the Democrats.
