= Mississippi Mills =

Mississippi Mills may refer to:

- Mississippi Mills, Ontario, a town in Canada
- Mississippi Mills (Wesson, Mississippi), an historic textile mill in the United States
