= Gallman, Mississippi =

- Unincorporated community
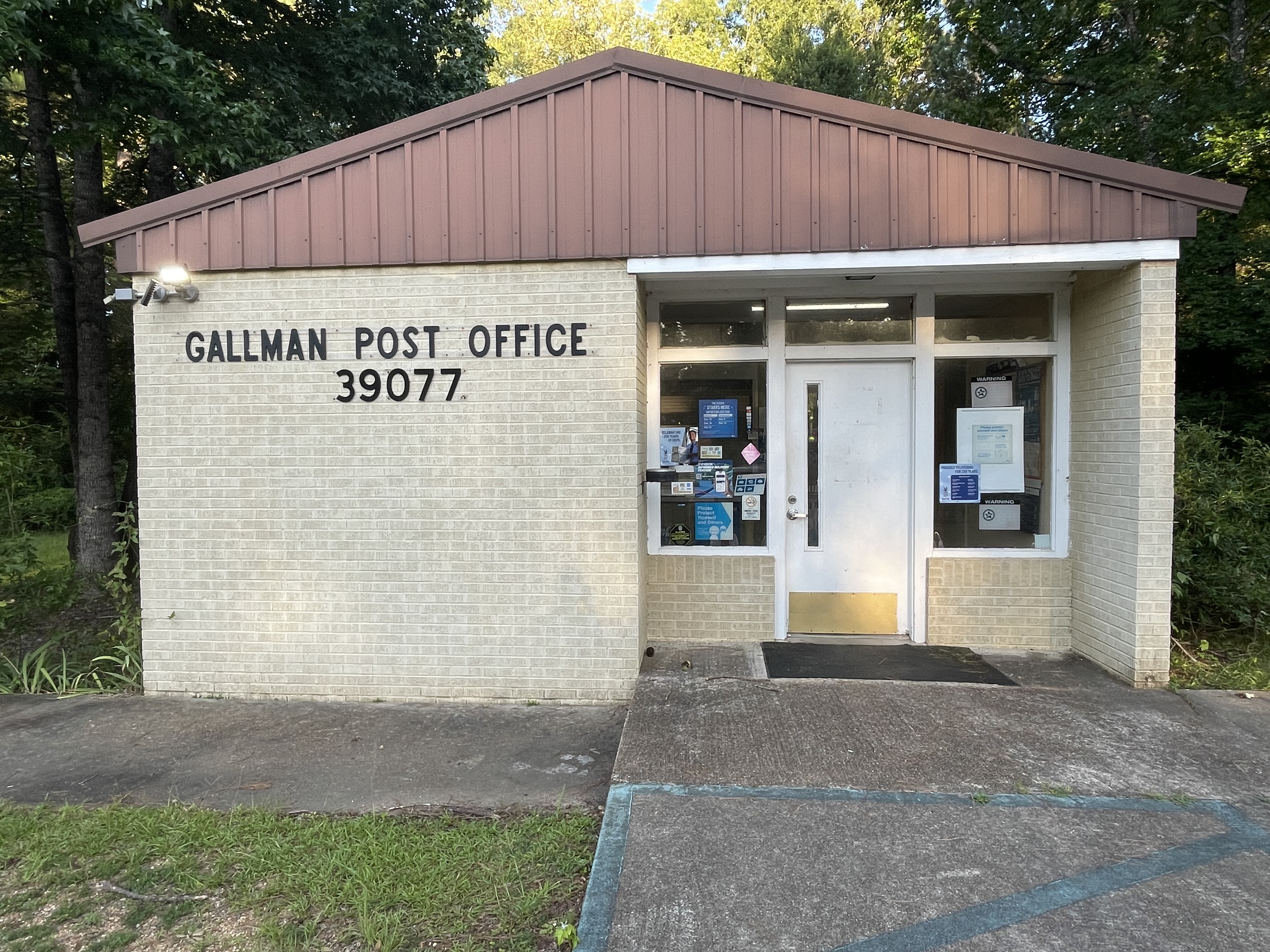

- Location within Mississippi Location within the United States
- Coordinates: 31°55′56″N 90°23′21″W
- Country: United States
- State: Mississippi
- County: Copiah
- Elevation: 472 ft (144 m)
- Time zone: UTC-6 (Central (CST))
  - Summer (DST): UTC-5 (CDT)
- ZIP code: 39077
- Area codes: 601 & 769
- GNIS feature ID: 670303

Gallman is an unincorporated community in Copiah County, Mississippi, United States. Gallman is located along Interstate 55 and U.S. Route 51 4.25 miles (6.84 km) south-southwest of Crystal Springs. Gallman has a post office with ZIP code 39077, which opened on November 8, 1872.

Gallman is home to Copiah Academy, a private school in the Mississippi Association of Independent Schools. Copiah Academy services K3-12th grades and is a Christian-based college preparatory school.

== History ==
Gallman is named for an early resident. Gallman is located on the former Illinois Central Railroad. In 1906 the population was estimated to be at 200 people, and the community was home to a church and several stores.

The Gallman Historic District was included in the National Register of Historic Places listings in Copiah County, Mississippi on March 31, 1986.

A post office operated under the name Wyoming from 1857 to 1858.
