= Wesson Attendance Center =

Location
- 1048 Grove Street; Wesson, Mississippi; Copiah County; United States; 31.85938°N 90.40386°W

Information
- Type: Public all grades
- Motto: "Once a Cobra , always a Cobra”
- School district: Copiah County School District
- Principal: Tommy Clopton
- Staff: 59.94 (FTE)
- Grades: K–12
- Enrollment: 877 (2022-2023)
- Student to teacher ratio: 14.63
- Colors: Blue, red and white
- Athletics: football, soccer, tennis, baseball, softball, golf, basketball, volleyball, track, powerlifting, cross country
- Mascot: Mighty Cobra
- Website: www.copiah.ms/wac/index

Wesson Attendance Center is a K–12 school in Wesson, Mississippi.

== Background ==
Wesson Attendance Center is one of four schools that make up the Copiah County School District.

== Athletics ==
In 2007 students at this high school won the 2A state golf championship.

== Gender discrimination lawsuit ==
In 2009, an honor student named Ceara Sturgis submitted a photograph of herself wearing a tuxedo for the senior yearbook. School officials told her that her picture was inappropriate on the basis of her clothing not matching her gender. The school chose to exclude Sturgis from the yearbook. Sturgis claims that she was removed from the yearbook because she is a lesbian. She alleged that the school discriminated against her.

The ACLU filed a lawsuit against the school district on behalf of Sturgis. Sturgis graduated from Wesson Attendance Center in May 2010. In December 2011, the ACLU settled the lawsuit after the school district agreed to require all students to pose in caps and gowns for the yearbook.
