= Sand Hill, Copiah County, Mississippi =

Sand Hill, Mississippi
- Unincorporated community
- Location within Mississippi Location within the United States
- Coordinates: 31°44′01″N 90°18′21″W
- Country: United States
- State: Mississippi
- County: Copiah
- Elevation: 344 ft (105 m)
- Time zone: UTC-6 (Central (CST))
  - Summer (DST): UTC-5 (CDT)
- Area codes: 601 & 769
- GNIS feature ID: 692206

Sand Hill is an unincorporated community in Copiah County, Mississippi, United States. Sand Hill is 5.8 miles (9.3 km) east-northeast of Wesson.
