= Richard Christmas =

American state legislator in Mississippi

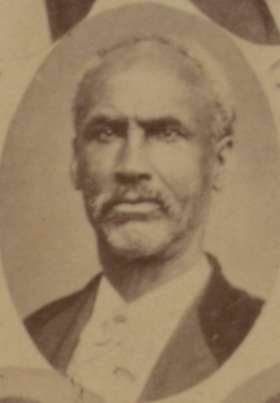
Christmas around 1877

Richard Christmas was an American state legislator in Mississippi. He represented Copiah County in the Mississippi House of Representatives in 1874 and 1875.

He was born in North Carolina. He served in the 5th U.S. Colored Heavy Artillery.

Either a man born in Tennessee with the same name or one from North Carolina have been identified as likely being this Richard Christmas.

== See also ==
- African American officeholders from the end of the Civil War until before 1900
