= Edmund Richardson =

Cotton magnate in southern United States

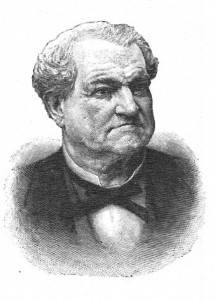
- Edmund Richardson "Cotton King"
- Born: June 28, 1818
- Died: January 11, 1886 (aged 67)

Edmund Richardson (June 28, 1818 − January 11, 1886) was an American entrepreneur who acquired great wealth during the mid-19th century by producing and marketing cotton in the states of Mississippi, Louisiana, and Arkansas. At the time of his death, he was described as the richest man in the South.

== Early years ==
Edmund Richardson was born June 28, 1818, in Caswell County, North Carolina, to James Richardson and Nancy Payne Ware. He was educated in common schools from the age of 10 to 14 but left school in 1832 and clerked in a dry goods store in Danville, Virginia. In 1840, he inherited $2,800 (~$85,071 in 2024) and a few slaves from his father's estate.

By his early 20s, Richardson had settled in Jackson, Mississippi, where he formed a mercantile partnership with branch stores in neighboring communities. In 1848, Richardson married Margaret Elizabeth Patton of Huntsville, Alabama, with whom he had seven children.

== Civil War economics ==
When the American Civil War began in 1861, Richardson owned five cotton plantations, as well as country stores in the towns of Brandon, Canton, Jackson, Morton, and Newton, Mississippi. In addition, he was a partner in Thornhill and Company, a New Orleans, cotton factoring firm. They were in the business of judging the quality of cotton, keeping abreast of cotton crop production, and analyzing cotton price trends.

When the Union's naval blockade closed access to the New Orleans port, Thornhill & Co. was a half-million dollars in debt and had customers who could not pay their credit obligations to the firm. Although the Civil War years caused debt problems for Richardson, at the end of the war he still owned the five plantations and 500 bales of cotton. He marketed his assets, rebounded financially, and was out of debt within a year.

== Post-war ventures ==
Since work for former slaves was almost impossible to find after the Civil War, many prisons in the South were overcrowded with vagrants. In 1868, Richardson exploited this abundance of labor by striking a deal with Federal authorities in Mississippi (still under the rule of postwar Reconstruction), to use ex-slave prison inmates to work his farms in the Mississippi-Yazoo Delta. Richardson agreed to provide supervisory guards and to treat the prisoners well by providing food and clothing. The state agreed to pay Richardson $18,000 per year for maintenance, plus the cost of transporting prisoners to and from his delta plantation camps.

Richardson used the prison laborers to build levees, clear trees from swamps, and plow fields. Production of cotton using the convict lease system allowed Richardson to amass a fortune. By the 1880s, he had a mansion in New Orleans and another in Jackson, Mississippi. He also acquired the Griffin-Spragins mansion in the Mississippi Delta.

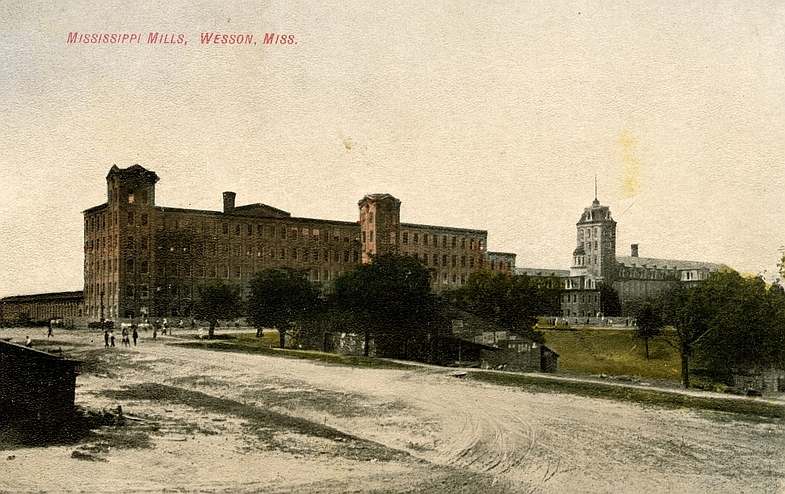
Mississippi Mills textile plant, circa 1900.

He owned country stores, banks, steamboats, railroads, cotton-seed mills, a cotton commission house in New Orleans (Richardson and May), a controlling interest in the South's largest textile plant (Mississippi Mills) in Wesson, Mississippi, and dozens of cotton plantations in the states of Arkansas, Louisiana, and Mississippi. Richardson was in partnership with General Nathan Bedford Forrest in planting cotton on President's Island, near Memphis, Tennessee, from 1872 until Forrest's death in 1877.

When the World's Industrial and Cotton Centennial Exposition came to New Orleans in 1884–1885, Richardson served as chairman of the Board of Management, donating $25,000 of his personal funds to the event. In the mid-1880s, Richardson was one of the largest cotton growers in the world with 25,000 acres (10,000 hectares) in cultivation and became known as the "Cotton King". Richardson was frequently referred to by the honorary title of "Colonel", thought to be granted by the Governor of Mississippi or some political affiliate.

== Death and legacy ==
On January 11, 1886, Edmund Richardson was stricken with apoplexy at Jackson, Mississippi, and he died before assistance could arrive. His obituary described him as "the richest man in the South and the largest cotton planter in the world, second only to the Khedive of Egypt". At the time of his death, his estate was estimated to be worth 10 to 15 million dollars.

Edmund Richardson was interred at Greenwood Cemetery in Jackson. His monument is the tallest in the cemetery and was hand-carved in Italy.
