= Ruby, Copiah County, Mississippi =

Ruby, Mississippi
- Unincorporated community
- Location within Mississippi Location within the United States
- Coordinates: 31°56′46″N 90°14′53″W
- Country: United States
- State: Mississippi
- County: Copiah
- Elevation: 279 ft (85 m)
- Time zone: UTC-6 (Central (CST))
  - Summer (DST): UTC-5 (CDT)
- Area codes: 601 & 769
- GNIS feature ID: 686732

Ruby is an unincorporated community in Copiah County, Mississippi, United States. Ruby is 7 miles (11 km) east-southeast of Crystal Springs.

== History ==
Ruby was first settled in 1850 and named for the daughter of the first store owner, Albert Gates. The community was also home to a sawmill and school. Many of the settlers moved to Hopewell after a railroad and depot were built there in 1909.

Ruby was home to a pharmacist in 1916.

A post office operated under the name Ruby from 1892 to 1908.
