= Melerson Guy Dunham =

American educator and activist (1904–1985)

- Born: May 6, 1904; Tylertown, Mississippi
- Died: December 1985 (aged 81)
- Education: Rust College (bachelor's degree); Indiana University (master's degree); Mississippi Minister Industrial College (honorary doctorate)
- Occupations: Professor of history and literature
- Known for: Funding college educations for African American students, teacher, civil rights and women's rights activist
- Spouse: James A. Dunham

Melerson Guy Dunham (May 6, 1904 – December 1985) was an American educator and activist from the state of Mississippi. She put herself through college and graduate school working in the fields and as a domestic worker. Mississippi Minister Industrial College awarded her an honorary doctorate. Dunham taught history, literature, and social science over her career at Alcorn Agricultural and Mechanical College and Prentiss Institute. At both schools she created weekend programs for Rural and Urban Black Women Leaders and Rural and Urban Black Women Leaders about overcoming challenges.

Dunham was active in educational, religious, and civic organizations throughout her life, founding and leading a number of them. She and her husband helped five people complete their education to become ministers, a teacher, and a medical clinician. Dunham attained the title "Mom", although she had no children of her own, for the support that she provided young people. She established an organization for young ladies to obtain opportunities to work, receive mentoring, and learn and provide life-saving medical care.

Dunham was recognized as a historian due to her membership in three history organizations and having published the book entitled Centennial History of Alcorn College. She received the black history award at the University of Southern Mississippi.

== Personal life and education ==
Melerson Guy was born on May 6, 1904 in Tylertown, Mississippi, the daughter of Josephine Ratliff and Floyd Guy. She grew up in Walthall County, Mississippi and attended county schools. Dunham picked cotton, worked in the fields, cleaned houses, and washed and ironed laundry to survive, attain a college education, and augment her earnings when she first began teaching for four months a year.

She attended Rust College of Holly Springs, Mississippi, where received her Bachelor of Arts degree in 1948. She studied history at Indiana University Bloomington for her Master of Arts degree in 1958. She was also educated at Tulane University and Carnegie Mellon University. In 1973, Mississippi Minister Industrial College awarded her an honorary doctorate.

Melerson married James A. Dunham on February 6, 1943. They did not have any children, but had a number of "adopted children" that they helped and educated. She lived in Tylertown, Mississippi before she married, and during the 1970s. In 1972, Dunham became president of the United Methodist Women's Conference of Mississippi. Dunham died in December 1985. Her last known residence was Bogalusa, Louisiana.

== Career ==
In 1958, Dunham taught social science at the Walthall County Training School. Dunham taught at the Alcorn Agricultural and Mechanical College, a college established for African Americans. Dunhan was chairman of the religious life committee at Alcorn, coordinating the second annual Rural and Urban Ministers' Institute program "The Challenge of Today's Ministry" in 1963. Church and farming organizations and the Department of Negro Work supported the event. She retired from Alcorn in 1970.

After Alcorn, Dunham was a part-time professor of history and literature at the Prentiss Institute Junior College in Prentiss, Mississippi. She was chairman of religious life activities and the campus minister for the United Methodist Church at the college. Dunham was a member of the Ministers of Blacks in Higher Education.

Dunham was national chairman for the Institute for Rural and Urban Black Women Leaders, who held their second annual program in 1974 at Prentiss Institute. The program that year was "Woman Awareness on the Challenge of Education". The Melerson Guy Dunham Rural and Urban Women's Institute program was "Challenge, Change and the Family" from April 18 to 19, 1980.

== Historian ==
Dunham was a member of the Southern Historical Association, Mississippi Historical Society, and the Mississippi Folk Lore associations. She wrote the book Centennial History of Alcorn College. Dunham received the black history award at the University of Southern Mississippi in 1979.

== Activism ==
Dunham was a women's rights activist. She and her husband were civil rights activists, as were her friends Fannie Lou Hamer (an activist who was inducted into the National Women's Hall of Fame) and Mary Frances Berry. Dunham was a member of the Federation of Women's Clubs, serving as the president of the Seventh District, a member of the Credentials Committee of the National Federation, vice president of the State Federation, and statistician of the Southeastern Federation. Dunham had also served as president for Women's Association of Colored Women in Mississippi.

After she retired, Dunham became a member of the Mississippi Humanities Council, where she was a public speaker and obtained funding through her proposals from 1972 to 1978. She was working on a proposal the day she had a stroke. She would not be admitted to the hospital until she had the proposal with her. Her goal was "improving the status of people in Mississippi through education."

Born without advantages, Dr. Dunham took what God gave her—human dignity—and tried to instill dignity into others. She had no patience with timidity. She involved herself in civic issues for a better community, was a strong advocate for education, and committed herself to the mission of her church.

— Cora Norman, Mississippi in transition : the role of the Mississippi Humanities Council

Dunham, of the National Association of Colored Women's Clubs, established the Lillie Mae Bryant club, with Bertha Redfield. Its objective was to provide opportunities for young ladies to work and serve the seniors and others in their community. They provided home care or visited people at nursing homes or hospitals. Club members learned how to save people in need of health through the Lifeline program, saving two peoples' lives. The club supported the summer McComb Junior Auxiliary's Camp Sunshine program, which tutored and mentored girls. The motto of the group was "Know The emblem is of the four-leaf clover, to represent the mind, body, soul and race."

== Fund college educations ==
Dunham provided funding for students, such as Louise Spears, whom she called her "daughter". Spears attended the University of Michigan. A student that Dunham helped attended the University of Michigan to obtain their Ph.D. By 1977, she had put five people through college, and others whom she helped also called her "Mom". The college graduates earned their degrees and attained positions as professors, medical clinicians, and ministers. One student attained her doctorate.
