= Tabernacle Methodist Church =

Historic church in Mississippi, United States

- U.S. National Register of Historic Places
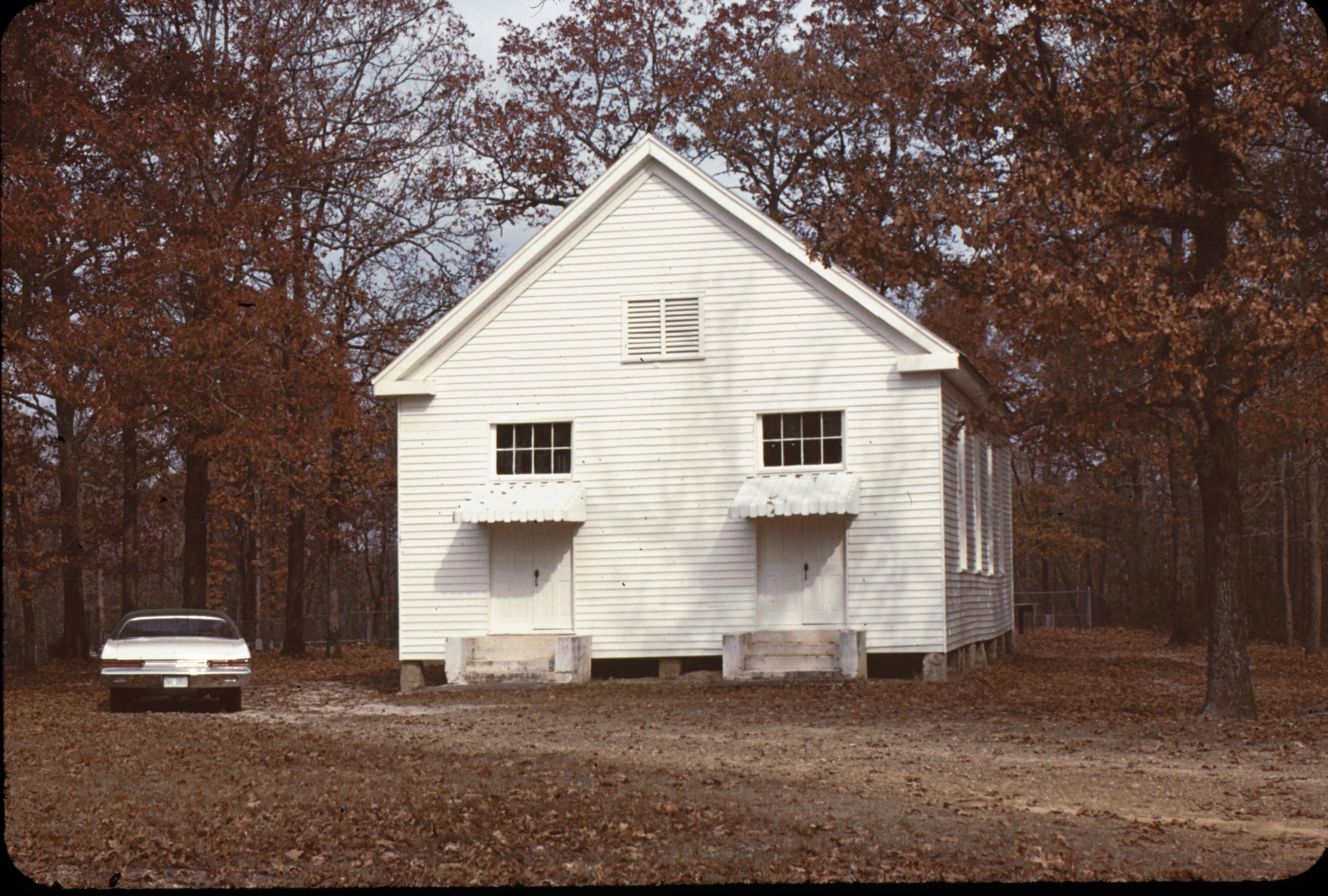

- Location within Mississippi Location within the United States
- Nearest city: Hazlehurst, Mississippi
- Coordinates: 31°54′37″N 90°28′17″W
- Area: 1.9 acres (0.77 ha)
- Built: 1857
- Architectural style: Mid 19th Century Revival
- MPS: Copiah County MPS
- NRHP reference No.: 96000704
- Added to NRHP: June 28, 1996

Tabernacle Methodist Church is a historic church near Hazlehurst, Mississippi.

It was built in 1857 as the tabernacle of a camp meeting and was added to the National Register in 1996. The church is now owned and maintained by the Tabernacle Methodist Church Cemetery Association.

It has a one room interior containing pews on either side of a middle aisle, and an altar with a curved, carved, altar rail.
