= Conn, Mississippi =

- Unincorporated community
- Location within Mississippi Location within the United States
- Coordinates: 31°53′53″N 90°42′36″W
- Country: United States
- State: Mississippi
- County: Copiah
- Elevation: 292 ft (89 m)
- Time zone: UTC-6 (Central (CST))
  - Summer (DST): UTC-5 (CDT)
- Area codes: 601 & 769
- GNIS feature ID: 691783

Conn is an unincorporated community in Copiah County, Mississippi, United States.

A post office operated under the name Conn from 1897 to 1930.
