= Mississippi Mills Packing and Shipping Rooms =

- U.S. National Register of Historic Places
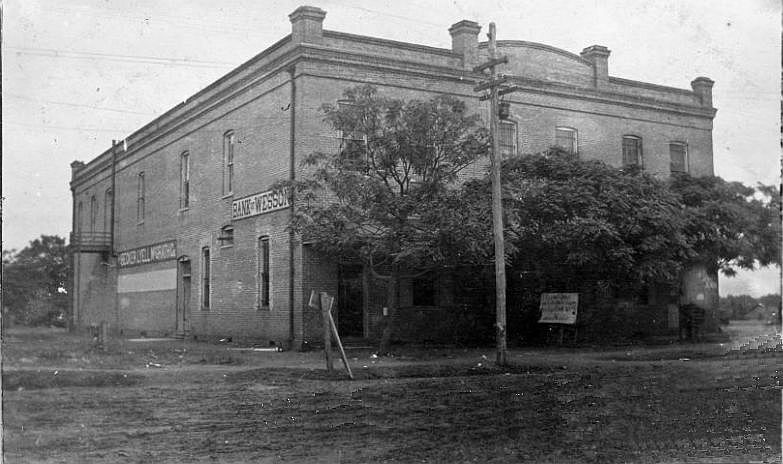

- Location within Mississippi Location within the United States
- Location: 2058 US 51, Wesson, Mississippi
- Coordinates: 31°42′5″N 90°23′50″W
- Area: less than one acre
- Built: 1875
- Architectural style: Early Commercial, Italianate
- MPS: Copiah County MPS
- NRHP reference No.: 96000185
- Added to NRHP: March 1, 1996

The Mississippi Mills Packing and Shipping Rooms building in Wesson, Mississippi was constructed ca. 1875. The building was listed on the National Register of Historic Places in 1996. According to the NRHP nomination, the building "is locally significant in the area of industry..., representing the importance of the cotton and woolen mills industry to the history and development of Wesson and the surrounding area." The building was part of a textile mill complex known as Mississippi Mills which operated from ca. 1873 to 1910. The packing and shipping room facility is the only remaining building from the Mississippi Mills era.
