= Hopewell, Copiah County, Mississippi =

Hopewell, Mississippi
- Unincorporated community
- Location within Mississippi Location within the United States
- Coordinates: 31°56′51″N 90°12′55″W
- Country: United States
- State: Mississippi
- County: Copiah
- Elevation: 253 ft (77 m)
- Time zone: UTC-6 (Central (CST))
  - Summer (DST): UTC-5 (CDT)
- Area codes: 601 & 769
- GNIS feature ID: 671406

Hopewell is an unincorporated community in Copiah County, Mississippi, United States. Hopewell is located on the former Illinois Central Gulf Railroad.

== History ==
Hopewell was first founded by settlers who moved to the area when a new railroad depot was built east of Ruby. The community was named Hopewell by W. T. Sandifer, Daniel Young, and a Mr. Barron.

Hopewell was home to a pharmacist in 1916.

A post office operated under the name Hopewell from 1908 to 1956.
