= Alton D. Slay =

United States Air Force general

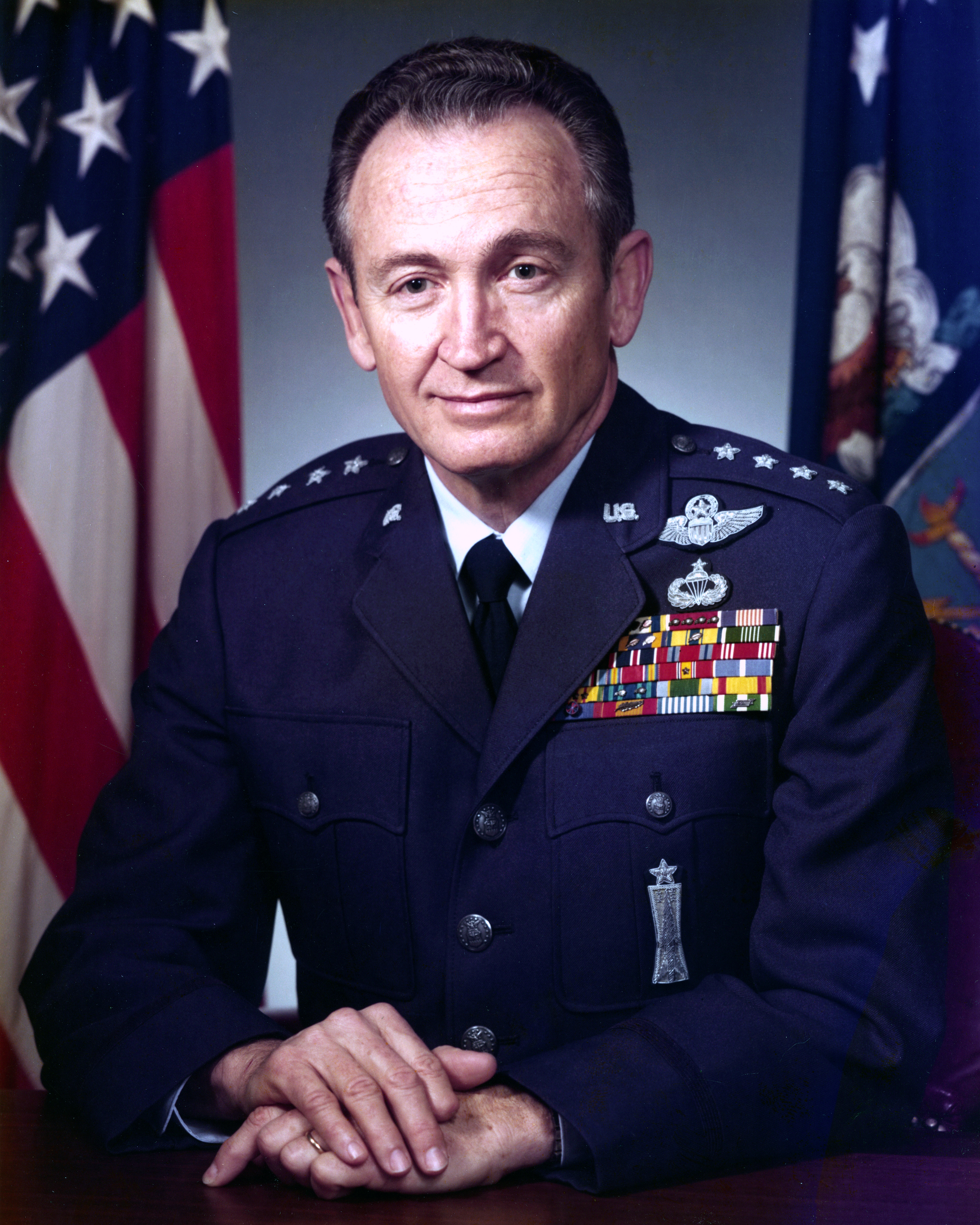
- General Alton D. Slay
- Born: November 11, 1924; Crystal Springs, Mississippi
- Died: November 16, 2015 (aged 91); Warrenton, Virginia
- Military career
- Allegiance: United States
- Branch: United States Air Force
- Service years: 1944–1981
- Rank: General
- Commands: Air Force Systems Command
- Conflicts: World War II; Korean War; Vietnam War

General Alton Davis Slay, Sr. (November 11, 1924 – November 16, 2015) was a four star United States Air Force general and former commander, Air Force Systems Command, Andrews Air Force Base, Maryland.

Slay was a native of Crystal Springs, Mississippi. He was a command pilot with more than 8,000 flying hours, principally in single-engine and jet fighter aircraft, accumulated since his graduation from flying school at Craig Field, Alabama, in 1944. He flew 181 combat missions over Southeast Asia in jet fighters. He was a graduate of the Navy Parachutist School and wore the Senior Air Force Parachutist Badge and the Senior Missileman Badge.

Slay was a 1965 graduate of George Washington University at Washington, D.C., with a degree in mathematics; he attended the six-week Harvard Business School Advanced Management Program; and the Canadian National Defence College.

His assignments included deputy chief of staff, research and development, Headquarters U.S. Air Force, Washington, D.C., vice commander of the Air Training Command, San Antonio, Texas; commander of the Lowry Technical Training Command, Denver; deputy chief of staff, operations, Seventh Air Force, in Southeast Asia; director of operations, Military Assistance Command, Vietnam; deputy chief of staff, operations, Air Force Systems Command; commander of the Air Force Flight Test Center, Edwards Air Force Base, California; and assistant deputy chief of staff, plans and operations, U.S. Air Forces in Europe. He assumed command of Systems Command in March 1978, and was promoted to four star rank on April 1, 1978. Slay retired from the Air Force on January 31, 1981.

== Awards and decorations ==
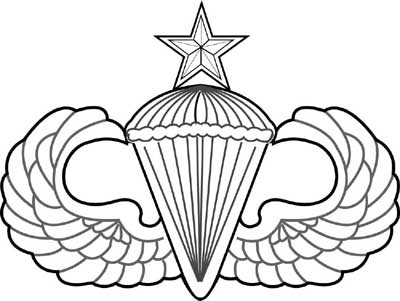
US Air Force Command Pilot Badge
Senior Missile Maintenance Badge
Senior Parachutist Badge

Air Force Distinguished Service Medal with two bronze oak leaf clusters
Legion of Merit with four oak leaf clusters
Soldier's Medal
Air Medal with six oak leaf clusters
Air Force Commendation Medal with oak leaf cluster
Army Commendation Medal
Air Force Outstanding Unit Award
Combat Readiness Medal
Army Good Conduct Medal
American Campaign Medal
World War II Victory Medal
National Defense Service Medal with one bronze service star
Korean Service Medal
Vietnam Service Medal with three service stars
Air Force Longevity Service Award with silver and three bronze oak leaf clusters
Small Arms Expert Marksmanship Ribbon
Air Force Distinguished Service Order, 1st class (Vietnam)
Vietnamese Cross of Gallantry with palm
Vietnam Armed Forces Honor Medal, 1st class
United Nations Korea Medal
Vietnam Campaign Medal

In 2005, Slay won four gold medals at the National Senior Games in cycling. As of 2007, at age 83, he was still competing in the Senior Games cycling events. He resided in Warrenton, Virginia until he died of blood cancer on November 16, 2015, 5 days after his 91st birthday.
