= Pleasant Valley Methodist Church =

Historic church in Mississippi, United States

- U.S. National Register of Historic Places
- Location within Mississippi Location within the United States
- Nearest city: Hazlehurst, Mississippi
- Coordinates: 31°45′38″N 90°33′13″W
- Area: 2.8 acres (1.1 ha)
- Built: 1840
- Architectural style: Mid 19th Century Revival
- MPS: Copiah County MPS
- NRHP reference No.: 96000703
- Added to NRHP: August 01, 1996

Pleasant Valley Methodist Church is a historic church in Hazlehurst, Mississippi.

It was built in 1840 and added to the National Register of Historic Places in 1996.
