= Griffin–Spragins House =

Historic house in Mississippi, United States

- U.S. National Register of Historic Places
- Location within Mississippi Location within the United States
- Nearest city: Greenville, Mississippi
- Coordinates: 33°17′47″N 91°8′5″W
- Area: less than one acre
- Built: 1850
- Architectural style: Greek Revival
- NRHP reference No.: 84002445
- Added to NRHP: April 5, 1984

The Griffin–Spragins House (first called the Refuge Plantation House) is located in Refuge, Mississippi, approximately 10 mi (16 km) southwest of Greenville.

Built in approximately 1850, it was listed on the National Register of Historic Places in 1984.

Francis Griffin purchased land in 1831 on a high ridge bordering the Mississippi River where he established "Refuge Plantation". By 1850, Griffin had 150 slaves working on his plantation. The "Refuge Plantation House", shaded by oak trees and protected from the river by a levee system, was erected with a view of the river.

The Griffins lost much of their fortune during the Civil War, and were forced to sell the property. A subsequent owner was Edmund Richardson, one of the wealthiest cotton growers in the south.

The home remains today one of the best examples of a mid-nineteenth-century plantation house in Washington County.
