= Martinsville, Mississippi =

- Unincorporated community
- Location within Mississippi Location within the United States
- Coordinates: 31°47′28″N 90°24′25″W
- Country: United States
- State: Mississippi
- County: Copiah
- Elevation: 443 ft (135 m)
- Time zone: UTC-6 (Central (CST))
  - Summer (DST): UTC-5 (CDT)
- Area codes: 601 & 769
- GNIS feature ID: 692045

Martinsville is an unincorporated community in Copiah County, Mississippi, United States. Martinsville is located on the former Illinois Central Gulf Railroad. Martinsville was named for B. F. Martin, a former postmaster.

Martinsville was once home to two churches, a school, and lumber mills.

A post office operated under the name Martinsville from 1868 to 1964.

During the Yellow Fever Epidemic of 1878, Martinsville was quarantined for three months and had no diagnosed cases of yellow fever.
