= Bertha LaBranche Johnson =

American educator

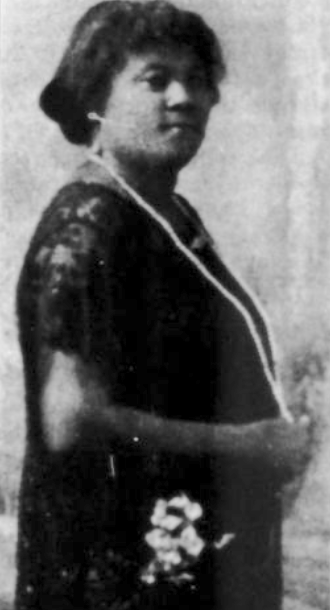
- Bertha LaBranche Johnson, from a 1924 publication
- Born: May 7, 1882; Wesson, Mississippi, U.S.
- Died: February 24, 1971 (aged 88); Prentiss, Mississippi, U.S.
- Other name: Bertha LeBranche Johnson
- Occupations: Educator, clubwoman
- Spouse: Jonas Edward Johnson

Bertha LaBranche Johnson (May 7, 1882 – February 24, 1971) was an American educator and clubwoman. She was co-founder and president of the Prentiss Institute in Jefferson Davis County, Mississippi, and president of the Mississippi State Federation of Colored Women's Clubs. In 1943, she was described as "probably the best known Negro woman, nationally, within the Magnolia state."

== Early life and education ==
Bertha LaBranche was born in Wesson, Mississippi, the daughter of Jule LaBranche and Onie Smith LaBranche. She graduated from Tuskegee Institute in 1902. She received an honorary master's degree from Tuskegee in 1941. She was a member of Delta Sigma Theta.

== Career ==
With her husband Jonas Edward Johnson, she co-founded the Prentiss Normal and Industrial Institute in Mississippi, a rural school they opened in 1906. The school succeeded, and expanded to include secondary classes and a junior college by 1953. In 1955, the campus became home to the first Heifer International program in the United States, when a campus dairy was built by the charity. She was president of the school from 1954 to 1971.

Johnson and her husband also founded Oak Park Vocational School in 1927, in Laurel, Mississippi. This school focused on agricultural training courses. She was a member of the Mississippi Association of Teachers in Colored Schools.

Johnson was president of the Mississippi State Federation of Colored Women's Clubs. She was also active in the National Federation of Colored Women's Clubs, serving as its statistician for five years. She worked for libraries to serve Black patrons in Mississippi, for senior housing and care, for special education opportunities for Black children with disabilities, and other causes. She wrote a book about the work of Black clubwomen in Mississippi, Lifting as We Climb (1940). She was named Outstanding Woman of the Year by the National Association of Colored Women in 1951.

== Publications ==
- Lifting as We Climb (1940)

== Personal life and legacy ==
LaBranche married Jonas Edward Johnson in 1904. They had three children. Her husband died in 1953, and she died in 1971, in her late eighties. One of her grandchildren, Joyce Johnson Bolden, was a music professor at Alcorn State University for 42 years.

The Prentiss school continued in operation until 1989. The main building, funded with a Rosenwald grant, was restored and reopened in 2013 as a community and event space. It is listed on the National Register of Historic Places.
