= National Register of Historic Places listings in Simpson County, Mississippi =

Location of Simpson County in Mississippi

This is a list of the National Register of Historic Places listings in Simpson County, Mississippi.

This is intended to be a complete list of the properties and districts on the National Register of Historic Places in Simpson County, Mississippi, United States. Latitude and longitude coordinates are provided for many National Register properties and districts; these locations may be seen together in a map.

There are 4 properties and districts listed on the National Register in the county.

This National Park Service list is complete through NPS recent listings posted October 23, 2026.

== Current listings ==
	Name on the Register	Image	Date listed	Location	City or town	Description
1	Gatesville Bridge		November 16, 1988 (#88002482)	Spans the Pearl River on a county road east of Gatesville; 31°59′46″N 90°13′26″W	Pearl	Extends into Copiah County
2	L'Dora Lewis Mound (22SI512)	L'Dora Lewis Mound (22SI512)	March 1, 1987 (#87000133)	Address restricted	Pearl	
3	The Mendenhall Hotel and Revolving Tables Restaurant		September 18, 2023 (#100009037)	100 Wm. Gerald Morgan Memorial Dr. 31°57′36″N 89°52′13″W	Mendenhall	
4	Simpson County Courthouse	Simpson County Courthouse	August 29, 1985 (#85001898)	Courthouse Square; 31°57′46″N 89°52′10″W	Mendenhall	

== See also ==
- List of National Historic Landmarks in Mississippi
- National Register of Historic Places listings in Mississippi
