= Mary Lou Godbold =

American politician and teacher (1912–2008)

- Godbold in 1961

Member of the Mississippi State Senate
- In office 1956–1960
- Preceded by: Tillman Godbold
- Succeeded by: Homer L. Samuels

Personal details
- Born: Mary Lou Gray; October 15, 1912
- Died: April 18, 2008 (aged 95) Oxford, Mississippi, U.S.
- Party: Democratic
- Spouse: Tillman Godbold (m. 1930; died 1957)
- Parent(s): James Walter Gray; Elma Arlivia Lee
- Education: Copiah–Lincoln Junior College; Mississippi College (BA); University of Mississippi (MEd)
- Profession: Politician, educator
- Known for: Being the third female state senator in Mississippi's history

Mary Lou Gray Godbold (née Gray; October 15, 1912 – April 18, 2008) was an American politician and educator. She was a member of the Mississippi State Senate from 1956 to 1960, succeeding her husband after his death. After she left office, she taught education at the University of Mississippi and was the president of the Mississippi Education Association from 1962 to 1963. A Democrat, she lived in Oxford and represented Lafayette County.

== Biography ==
Mary Lou Gray was born on October 15, 1912. She was the daughter of James Walter Gray, a Baptist minister, and Elma Arlivia Lee. She attended Copiah–Lincoln Junior College, where she played on the girls' basketball team and was a member of the music club. Gray married Tillman Godbold, a Lincoln County schoolteacher, in July 1930. She received the Bachelor of Arts degree with distinction from Mississippi College in 1934. She later earned the Master of Arts in Education degree from the University of Mississippi. Godbold became an elementary schoolteacher in Oxford, Mississippi. She was elected as the president of the Mississippi Education Association's Department of Classroom Teachers in 1957 and re-elected in 1958.

Tillman Godbold, who had been elected to the Mississippi State Senate in 1955, died of a cerebral hemorrhage resulting from a heart attack on April 6, 1957. After Mary Lou announced her candidacy in the special election to fill the vacant seat, all of the other candidates withdrew from the race and she was automatically elected, becoming the third female state senator in Mississippi's history. Godbold's first speech on the Senate floor was to defend Mississippi's requirement of a blood test for sexually transmitted infections or rubella before obtaining a marriage license. She was appointed as vice chairman of the Senate Public Health Committee in December 1957. She did not run for re-election in 1959, and was succeeded in the state senate by Homer L. Samuels.

After she left office, Godbold became a member of the faculty in the department of education at the University of Mississippi, and remained active in the Mississippi Education Association, as the legislative chairman and member of the board of directors in 1960. In March 1961, she was elected vice president of the 12,000-member statewide MEA in a voice vote at the annual convention, and elected president the following year. Godbold retired from teaching at the University of Mississippi in 1978. She died on April 18, 2008, at Baptist Memorial Hospital in Oxford, at the age of 95.

== See also ==
- Widow's succession
