= William Hester =

American tennis player and official

- Born: May 8, 1912; Hazlehurst, Mississippi, U.S.
- Died: February 8, 1993 (aged 80); Jackson, Mississippi, U.S.
- Other name: Slew
- Education: Millsaps College
- Occupations: Tennis player and official
- Children: 2 sons, 1 daughter

William Ewing Hester Jr. (May 8, 1912 – February 8, 1993), also known as Slew Hester, was an American tennis player and official. He was president of the United States Tennis Association (USTA) from 1977 to 1978, and the first USTA president from the Deep South. In spite of protests against the apartheid regime from African nations and civil rights activists, Hester let South Africa compete in two tournaments against the United States, first in Newport Beach, California, in April 1977 and next at Vanderbilt University in Nashville, Tennessee, in March 1978. He moved the USTA out of the West Side Tennis Club into the USTA National Tennis Center. He was inducted into the International Tennis Hall of Fame in 1981.

== Early life ==
William Hester was born on May 8, 1912, in Hazlehurst, Mississippi. He graduated from Millsaps College in 1933. During World War II, Hester participated in the Red Ball Express. He was awarded a Bronze Star Medal for his service.

== Career ==
Hester began his career as a salesman and distributor of air conditioners made by White Trucks, Carrier and General Electric. In 1955, he began a new career as a wildcatter, and he sold participation interests in prospective oil wells. Hester amassed a small fortune in the process.

As a tennis player, Hester won over 500 tournaments between 1925 and 1977, including nine national senior championships. He was the president of the Mississippi Tennis Association from 1954 to 1958, and the Southern Lawn Tennis Association from 1964 to 1966.

Hester joined the United States Tennis Association as an officer in 1969. He was its first vice president from 1974 to 1976, and its president from 1977 to 1978. He was the first president of the USTA from the Deep South. Under his tenure, he decided to move the USTA out of the West Side Tennis Club and convinced New York City officials to turn the Singer Bowl into the USTA National Tennis Center (renamed the USTA Billie Jean King National Tennis Center in 2006). Moreover, he decided to let a tournament between the United States and South Africa take place in Newport Beach, California, in April 1977 in spite of backlash from African nations and protesters due to the apartheid regime. He also let another tournament take place at Vanderbilt University's Memorial Gymnasium in Nashville, Tennessee, in March 1978 despite protests from civil rights leaders. However, Hester explained, "We do not support or agree with the apartheid policy of the South African government .... But we have entered the draw and, unfortunately, we have to play South Africa - and in the United States."

Hester was inducted into the Mississippi Sports Hall of Fame in 1968, the Southern Tennis Hall of Fame in 1978, and the International Tennis Hall of Fame in 1981.

== Death and legacy ==
Hester resided in Jackson, Mississippi. He had two sons, William Hester III and George Thomas Hester, and a daughter, Kathryn Healy Hester. He suffered from rheumatoid arthritis throughout his life. He died of congestive heart failure on February 8, 1993, in Jackson, at the age of 80.

The Slew Hester Adult Achievement Award, an annual award given by the United States Tennis Association, is named in his honor.
