= Glancy, Mississippi =

- Unincorporated community
- Location within Mississippi Location within the United States
- Coordinates: 31°49′07″N 90°29′47″W
- Country: United States
- State: Mississippi
- County: Copiah
- Elevation: 331 ft (101 m)
- Time zone: UTC-6 (Central (CST))
  - Summer (DST): UTC-5 (CDT)
- Area codes: 601 & 769
- GNIS feature ID: 691890

Glancy (also Center Point) is an unincorporated community in Copiah County, Mississippi, United States.

A post office operated under the name Glancy from 1904 to 1953.

The Southern Package Corporation once operated a mill in Glancy.
