= Virgia Brocks-Shedd =

African American librarian and poet

- Born: June 22, 1943; Carpenter, Mississippi, US
- Died: December 4, 1992 (aged 49)
- Education: Jackson State University; Atlanta University
- Occupation: Librarian

Virgia Brocks-Shedd (June 22, 1943 – December 4, 1992) was an American librarian and poet. She was the head librarian at the Tougaloo College library and was a founding member of multiple library associations, working to ensure African-Americans were represented in libraries. Brocks-Shedd published poetry in multiple venues and inspired an appreciation for literature in generations of students.

== Early life and education ==
Virgia Lee Brocks was born June 22, 1943, in Carpenter, Mississippi. When the Carpenter sawmill closed, her family moved to the community of Bel Pine. Brocks-Shedd became a boarding student at Piney Woods Country Life School at age thirteen and lived at the school until 1961.

While an undergraduate at Jackson State University, she studied under poet Margaret Walker Alexander, who she described as an inspirational force throughout her life. Brocks-Shedd earned her bachelor's degree from Jackson State in 1964, and went on to earn a Master of Library Science at Atlanta University the following year.

== Career as librarian ==
After graduating from library school, Brocks-Shedd was hired by Tougaloo College as an assistant librarian. She worked there the majority of her career, and in 1985 she became the director of library services at the college's L. Zenobia Coleman Library. Throughout her career, she inspired a love of literature through exposing students to poetry; she also worked to increase the representation of African American authors in Mississippi libraries.

Brocks-Shedd was active in the movement to integrate the Mississippi Library Association. She was one of the founding members of the Society of Mississippi Archivists and the African American Librarians Caucus of Mississippi. She was also a charter member of the Black Caucus of the American Library Association. In 1989 Brocks-Shedd was appointed for a five-year term on the Mississippi Library Commission Board of Commissioners; she was the first African-American to lead that board.

== Work as an author ==
While working as an assistant librarian at Tougaloo in 1966, Brocks-Shedd met writer-in-residence Audre Lorde; Lorde encouraged her to submit her poems to the college's literary magazine, Pound. Brocks-Shedd published many poems and articles in Jackson-based magazine Close-Up while serving as managing editor. Her work also appeared in Jackson Advocate and Jackson's Northside Reporter. Her signature poem, "Southern Roads/City Pavements", was included in multiple anthologies. Another major work, Mississippi Woods, was a chapbook published in 1980 which also included poems by fellow Mississippi poets Melvin Turner, Hampton Williams, and Henry Wilbanks.

Brocks-Shedd described the themes of her work as "man's ethical relationships with each other on Earth" and "love (physical and mental)," and said that Black poetry is "one of the best avenues for airing personal disgust and/or grievances".

== Legacy ==
Brocks-Shedd died from pancreatic cancer on December 4, 1992. In 1993 the Piney Woods Country Life School established the Virgia Brocks-Shedd Memorial Fund for Student Scholarships and Literary Achievement. In 1994 the Black Caucus Roundtable of the Mississippi Library Association established the Virgia Brocks-Shedd Scholarship, awarded to a minority student attending the School of Library and Information Science at the University of Southern Mississippi.
