= Copiah County School District =

School district in Mississippi, United States

Crystal Springs High School

Location
- 201 Newton Street; Crystal Springs, (Copiah County), Mississippi 39059; United States

Information
- Type: Public high school
- Principal: Bonnie Gatlin
- Staff: 25.34 (FTE)
- Enrollment: 404 (2023-24)
- Student to teacher ratio: 15.94
- Colors: Blue and gold
- Nickname: Tigers
- Website: cshs.copiah.ms

Wesson Attendance Center

Location
- 1048 Grove Street; Wesson, (Copiah County), Mississippi 39191; United States

Information
- Type: Public high school
- Principal: Tommy Clopton
- Staff: 59.36 (FTE)
- Enrollment: 858 (2023-2024)
- Student to teacher ratio: 14.45
- Colors: Blue, white and red
- Nickname: Cobras
- Website: wac.copiah.ms

The Copiah County School District is a public school district based in Copiah County, Mississippi (USA).

The district serves the communities of Crystal Springs, Wesson (the Copiah County portion), Georgetown, and Beauregard.

== Schools ==
- Crystal Springs
  - Crystal Springs Elementary School
  - Crystal Springs Middle School
  - Crystal Springs High School
- Wesson, Mississippi
  - Wesson Attendance Center

The student body at Crystal Springs High School is 81 percent African American, 9 percent Hispanic, and 9 percent white.

== Demographics ==
=== 2006-07 school year ===
There were a total of 2,914 students enrolled in the Copiah County School District during the 2006–2007 school year. The gender makeup of the district was 48% female and 52% male. The racial makeup of the district was 59.33% African American, 38.88% White, 1.65% Hispanic, and 0.14% Asian. 64.7% of the district's students were eligible to receive free lunch.

=== Previous school years ===
School Year	Enrollment	Gender Makeup		Racial Makeup				
School Year	Enrollment	Female	Male	Asian	African American	Hispanic	Native American	White
2005-06	3,038	48%	52%	0.20%	58.26%	1.58%	–	39.96%
2004-05	3,031	47%	53%	0.20%	58.96%	1.35%	–	39.49%
2003-04	3,069	48%	52%	0.20%	59.34%	1.08%	0.03%	39.36%
2002-03	3,160	48%	52%	0.19%	60.19%	0.73%	–	38.89%

== Accountability statistics ==
	2006-07	2005-06	2004-05	2003-04	2002-03
District Accreditation Status	Accredited	Accredited	Accredited	Accredited	Accredited
School Performance Classifications
Level 5 (Superior Performing) Schools	0	1	0	0	0
Level 4 (Exemplary) Schools	1	0	1	1	1
Level 3 (Successful) Schools	0	3	2	1	1
Level 2 (Under Performing) Schools	3	0	1	2	2
Level 1 (Low Performing) Schools	0	0	0	0	0
Not Assigned	0	0	0	0	0

== Alumni ==
- Royce Whittington was a star football player whose career continued through college. He was drafted by the Green Bay Packers in 1960 but after gaining a lot of weight was cut immediately by Vince Lombardi.
- Don "Scooter" Purvis running back at LSU including in 1958 championship team
- Larry Grantham, Super Bowl III champion with the New York Jets.

== See also ==
- List of school districts in Mississippi
