= Prentiss Institute =

Prentiss Institute (P.N.I.I.) was a school for African Americans in Prentiss, Mississippi, Jefferson Davis County, Mississippi. It was founded in 1907 by husband and wife Jonas Edward Johnson and Bertha LaBranche Johnson. It opened in a former plantation house where the Johnsons also lived. It became County Teacher Training School. It closed in 1989. The site is part of a historic district and includes the 1907 House that is individually listed on the National Register of Historic Places (National Register of Historic Places listings in Jefferson Davis County, Mississippi). In 1926, builder Malcolm LaBranche helped construct a concrete block school building on the campus. It is now a museum.

Students had academic classes in the morning and industrial training in the afternoon with vocational programs on agriculture, shoemaking, carpentry, blacksmithing, cooking, sewing, and millinery. In 1931 it became a junior college and in 1957 enrollment reached about 700. The county built a public school for African Americans in 1959, so the school's elementary and high school programs were phased out.

The school received Rosenwald funding. It had men's and women's basketball teams. It had a Heifer International dairy program.
