= Bruce M. Bailey =

U.S. Marine, author and humorist (1935–2022)

- Born: August 10, 1935; Crystal Springs, Mississippi, U.S.
- Died: December 4, 2022 (aged 87); Southlake, Texas, U.S.
- Occupations: Author, humorist, army officer
- Writing career
- Genres: History, humor, fiction

Bruce Marion Bailey (August 10, 1935 – December 4, 2022) was an American author and humorist who also used the pen name of R. Adam Solo.

Bailey's original name was Marion Bruce Bailey, but he was called "Bruce" by family and friends. Upon entering the military, he was informed that he would be addressed by his first name, not middle name or a nickname. He immediately proceeded to the local court house and officially changed his name to Bruce Marion Bailey. Bruce spent a career in the military flying reconnaissance missions, and upon retiring turned to writing.

== Early life ==
Bailey was born in Crystal Springs, Mississippi, a rural agricultural town, and spent his youth there involved in typical activities of a small town boy. He was first son of Sidney Bailey and Flayvelle Florence Bruce, his brother John was borne 12 years later. During Bailey's youth he developed a great love for aviation and aircraft of all types.

=== Military career ===
Bailey served as Honorary Sergeant and Bugler for an elite National Guard unit for four years while still in school (grades 6–10). He started college at Mississippi State and transferred schools often for nearly two years before enlisting in the Marine Corps. He spent two years as a reservist in and out of Camp Lejeune and Okinawa, but he did not enjoy Marine life. He often said the only thing they taught was how to hate and fight, so transferred to the U.S. Air Force Aviation Cadet program designed to commission officers for flight duties (pilots and navigators). Cadets enabled him to fulfill his dream of flying. His latest book, The Elite, tells of his time spent in that program.

His career in the Air Force (1956–77) was spent primarily as an Electronics Warfare Officer flying reconnaissance missions during the Cold War. He has written several books on the subject and became a sought-after authority. Throughout most of his career he flew combat missions and wore the Combat Crew badge. During the height of the Cold War he was constantly either on call or deployed. He was reportedly widely recognized as an effective leader by his peer and superior officers. He worked extensively with electronics and Radio Frequency theory and processing. By the time of his retirement, Bailey had been awarded the Bronze Star, the Distinguished Flying Cross several times, and many other medals and awards. His life in the military enabled him to travel the world where he had the opportunity to meet and interact with a range of people and cultures.

=== Life as an author ===
Upon retirement, he turned his attention to writing and published several volumes of historical fiction and non-fiction. In addition to authoring books, he also wrote several magazine articles for US and UK publications. Bruce was also sought out as an authority on the Cold War. He appeared on numerous television programs and magazine interviews, both in the US and Europe.

=== Personal life and death ===
Bailey married Fay Louise Olsen on March 12, 1960, in Topeka, Kansas. They had four children; Patti, James, Susie, and John. Bailey retired to live in the greater Fort Worth, Texas area.

Bailey died in Southlake, Texas on December 4, 2022, at the age of 87.

== Publications ==
- The Elite: The Chosen Few, 2007, ISBN 1-4241-7647-6
- Rencounter (By R. Adam Solo), 2001, ISBN 0-7388-5402-6
- As the Crow Flies (By R. Adam Solo), 2000, ISBN 0-7388-4718-6
- Essential, But Expendable (By R. Adam Solo), 2000, ISBN 0-7388-2856-4
- Flying the RB47, 2000, ISBN 0-9726127-0-X
- Red-Headed and Wrong-Handed, 1999, ISBN 0-7596-5516-2
- We See All. a Pictorial History of the 55th Strategic Reconnaissance Wing, 1982 ISBN 0-9609952-0-X

== Credits ==
The Invisible Force by Ed Parker, 2005, ISBN 1-933449-05-5 credited Bruce for allowing him to use material from his works
