= Carpenter United Methodist Church =

Historic church in Mississippi, United States

- U.S. National Register of Historic Places
- Location within Mississippi Location within the United States
- Nearest city: Utica, Mississippi
- Coordinates: 32°2′8″N 90°40′53″W
- Area: less than one acre
- Built: 1901
- Architect: Price, Will A.
- Architectural style: Carpenter Gothic
- MPS: Copiah County MPS
- NRHP reference No.: 96000705
- Added to NRHP: June 28, 1996

Carpenter United Methodist Church is a historic Methodist church in Utica, Mississippi, United States.

It was built in 1901 and added to the National Register in 1996.
