= Carpenter, Mississippi =

- Unincorporated community
- Location within Mississippi Location within the United States
- Coordinates: 32°02′03″N 90°40′49″W
- Country: United States
- State: Mississippi
- County: Copiah
- Elevation: 164 ft (50 m)
- Time zone: UTC-6 (Central (CST))
  - Summer (DST): UTC-5 (CDT)
- Area codes: 601 & 769
- GNIS feature ID: 668080

Carpenter is a small unincorporated community in Copiah County, Mississippi, United States. A former railroad town located seven miles from Utica in the extreme northwestern corner of the county, Carpenter was named for Joseph Neibert Carpenter, president of the Natchez, Jackson and Columbia Railroad.

== History ==
At the dawn of the 20th century, a railroad affectionately known as "the Little J" to distinguish it from the old New Orleans, Jackson and Great Northern Railway, serviced Natchez, Fayette, Lorman, Hermanville, Carlisle, Carpenter, Utica, Adams Station, Learned, Oakley, Raymond and Jackson, Mississippi. The Carpenter Methodist church, built in 1901, reflects the late Federal architecture Revival style that prevailed in Mississippi at the beginning of the 20th century. In 1990 the church yard was flanked by a massive water oak tree that measured 20 feet in circumference. This church still stands and remained in good condition as of 2000. Worship services are held each week. The Baptist church, built in 1903, features a rose window that is also typical of the late Federal style. Several water oak trees, each 15 feet in circumference, once enfolded the church, but are no longer standing due to bad weather and storms. One of the oldest homes in Carpenter built during the 1800s is the home of William L. Lloyd, a pioneer settler who donated the land for the depot and became the first depot agent. By 1970, the local Illinois Central Railroad line had closed down; the Carpenter depot was dismantled in the 1970s. By 2000, most residents were descendants of the pioneering families.

Carpenter was once home to eight general stores, a box factory, a blacksmith, two sawmills, and a drug store. The community was also served by a school and several churches.

A post office operated under the name Carpenter from 1884 to 1984.

== Notable person ==
- Virgia Brocks-Shedd, librarian and poet
