= Copiah–Lincoln Community College =

Public college in Wesson, Mississippi, US

Copiah-Lincoln Community College
- Type: Community college
- Established: 1928
- President: Dr. Dewayne Middleton
- Location: Wesson, Mississippi, United States; 31°41′34″N 90°24′0″W
- Nickname: Wolves
- Website: www.colin.edu/
- Location within Mississippi Location within the United States

Copiah–Lincoln Community College (Co–Lin) is a public community college with its main campus in Wesson, Mississippi. The Co–Lin District serves a seven-county area including Adams, Copiah, Franklin, Jefferson, Lawrence, Lincoln and Simpson counties. The college provides academic college-level courses for the first two years of four-year degree programs as well as career and technical programs.

== History ==
Copiah–Lincoln Agricultural High School, through the joint efforts of Copiah and Lincoln Counties, was established in the fall of 1915 in Wesson, Mississippi, at the edge of Copiah County. Copiah–Lincoln Junior College was organized during the summer of 1928. Since its establishment in 1928, Copiah–Lincoln has expanded in enrollment, facilities, and regional service, becoming a significant institution within Mississippi's community college system with an enrollment of over 3,200 and a physical plant valued at more than $35 million. Five counties have joined in supporting Copiah–Lincoln: Simpson County in 1934, Franklin County in 1948, Lawrence County in 1965, Jefferson County in 1967, and Adams County in 1971.

In the fall of 1972, at the request of local and state officials, Copiah–Lincoln opened a branch in Natchez, Mississippi, to expand access to higher education in the Natchez area. In the fall of 1997, the Simpson County Center opened in downtown Magee. Academic Evening Classes, Employment Training, and an LPN class were offered in that facility until the fall of 2005, when a new 35,000-square-foot (3,300 m^{2}) facility was opened at Legion Lake, between Magee and Mendenhall. The new facility, named in honor of the late Sidney Parker, opened in the fall of 2005 with a comprehensive academic program and three Career-Technical programs. Copiah–Lincoln Junior College became Copiah–Lincoln Community College on July 1, 1988, as approved by the state and the Board of Trustees. The name change reflected the institution’s broader educational and workforce development mission in the surrounding region.

== Accreditation ==
Copiah–Lincoln Community College is accredited by the Commission on Colleges of the Southern Association of Colleges and Schools to award Associate in Arts and Associate in Applied Science degrees. Copiah–Lincoln is also an active member of the American Association of Community Colleges, the Mississippi Association of Community and Junior Colleges, the Mississippi Association of Colleges, and the Southern Association of Community and Junior Colleges.

== Campuses ==
- Natchez Campus, Natchez, Mississippi
- Simpson County Center, Mendenhall, Mississippi
- Wesson Campus, Wesson, Mississippi

== Athletics ==
Co–Lin sponsors six men's sports (baseball, basketball, football, golf, tennis, and archery), and five women's sports (basketball, softball, tennis, soccer, and archery). It also sponsors a cheerleading squad, which has won multiple awards in junior-college coed competition at the University of Alabama UCA cheer camp. The athletic teams are nicknamed the Wolf Pack.

The teams compete in NJCAA Region 23, which includes colleges in Mississippi and Louisiana. The baseball, golf, and softball teams participate in Division II. All other sports, except football, play in Division I. Bryan Nobile is the college's athletic director.

The women's tennis team was the NJCAA Number 1 Academic Team of the Year in 2019. Co–Lin has produced over 100 NJCAA Academic All-Americans since 2000. The football team won the Mississippi Association of Community and Junior Colleges State Championship in 2012. The Lady Wolves basketball team, coached by Gwyn Young, the NJCAA's second-winningest active coach, has made numerous trips to the NJCAA National Tournament. The baseball team has finished fourth in both the 2000 and 2005 NJCAA World Series.

== Notable alumni ==
- Greg Briggs – former NFL player
- Tony Bryant – former NFL player
- Jim Carmody – football coach for Southern Mississippi Golden Eagles
- Nick Fairley – former NFL player
- LaDarius Galloway – indoor football player
- Mary Lou Godbold (1912–2008) – Mississippi state senator
- Victor Green – former NFL player
- Cindy Hyde-Smith – United States Senator
- Nook Logan – baseball player for the Washington Nationals
- DeQuan Menzie – former NFL player
- Cleveland Pinkney – former NFL player
- Montez Sweat – NFL player
- Randy Thomas – former NFL player
- M. K. Turk – basketball coach for Southern Mississippi Golden Eagles
- Reggie Williams – NBA player for the Golden State Warriors
- Tyrus Wheat – NFL player for the Dallas Cowboys
