= Bruce A. Bailey =

English author, architectural historian

Bruce Anthony Bailey ALA FSA (born March 1937) is an English author, architectural historian, archivist, librarian, freelance lecturer and photographer. He was elected a Fellow of the Society of Antiquaries of London on 1 January 2003. He lives near the village of Lowick, Northamptonshire, works as an archivist and librarian, and is a Trustee of the Northamptonshire Historic Churches Trust.

== Early life ==
Bruce Bailey was born in Northampton.

== Professional work ==
Bailey works as Archivist/Librarian at Drayton House, a Grade I listed stately home near Lowick, Northamptonshire; he also does archival work for the Spencer family's Althorp Estate.

Photographs by Bailey of buildings in Northamptonshire, Oxfordshire, Warwickshire, Hertfordshire, Leicestershire and Herefordshire are held in the Historic England Archive. Photographs by him are also held in the Conway Library archive of the Courtauld Institute of Art, University of London, currently undergoing a digitisation project known as Courtauld Connects. Around 70 of his photographs of monuments and statues can be viewed on the Courtauld's Art & Architecture website.

== Publications ==
=== Sole author ===
- Bailey, Bruce A; Northampton (England); Museums and Art Gallery (1968). Sculpture in England since the seventeenth century, with special reference to Northamptonshire. Northampton: County Borough of Northampton Museums and Art Gallery. OCLC 1181747318.
- Bailey, Bruce A (1999). Drayton House. Place of publication not identified: Architectural Digest Pub. OCLC 85093735.
- Tillemans, Peter; Bailey, Bruce A (1996). Northamptonshire in the early eighteenth century: the drawings of Peter Tillemans and others. Northampton: Northamptonshire Record Soc. ISBN 978-0-901275-60-8. OCLC 231710652.

=== Co-author ===
- Hatley, Victor A; Bailey, Bruce A (1988). Church of St Mary the Virgin, Whiston, Northamptonshire. England?: publisher not identified. OCLC 913418588.

=== Contributions to Pevsner Architectural Guides ===
- Pevsner, Nikolaus; BAILEY, Bruce; Cherry, Bridget; Isham, Gyles (1973). Northamptonshire. (2nd ed.) revised by Bridget Cherry. With contributions from Sir Gyles Isham and Bruce Bailey. Harmondsworth: Penguin. ISBN 978-0-14-071022-9. OCLC 555057698.
- Bailey, Bruce; Pevsner, Nikolaus (2013). Northamptonshire. New Haven, Conn: Yale Univ. Press. ISBN 978-0-300-18507-2. OCLC 1073233582.
- O'Brien, Charles; Bailey, Bruce; Lloyd, David W; Pevsner, Nikolaus (2018). Hampshire: south. ISBN 978-0-300-22503-7. OCLC 1056939855.

=== Selected articles in Northamptonshire Past & Present ===
- Bailey, Bruce A (2004). "Henry Mordaunt, 2nd Earl of Peterborough and Drayton House: A story of family intrigue and building activity in the late 17th century". Northamptonshire Past & Present. 57: 21–30. ISSN 0140-9131. OCLC 6948827063.
- Bailey, Bruce (2006). "A Northamptonshire Lady of Quality in the Middle of the Nineteenth Century: The Journals of Caroline Harriet Stopford of Drayton House". Northamptonshire Past & Present. 59: 43–53. ISSN 0140-9131. OCLC 6948826964.
- Bailey, Bruce A (2009). "Northamptonshire — You Can't Get Away from It! A Diversion Into Archives". Northamptonshire Past & Present. 62: 64–68. ISSN 0140-9131. OCLC 6948826263.
- Bailey, Bruce (2013). "The Restoration of St Andrew's Church, Arthingworth 1871-3: A Contest Between the Architect and the Incumbent". Northamptonshire Past & Present. 66: 44–47. ISSN 0140-9131. OCLC 6948825769.
- Bailey, Bruce (2013). "Revising Pevsner". Northamptonshire Past & Present. 66: 9–12. ISSN 0140-9131. OCLC 6948827166.
- Bailey, Bruce (2013). "A Carved Stone Head at Blisworth: Part of Holdenby House?". Northamptonshire Past & Present. 66: 48–49. ISSN 0140-9131. OCLC 6948828365.
- Bailey, Bruce (2013). "Two Garden Suburbs in Northampton That Never Were: The Spencer Estate, Dallington and the Delapré Garden Village". Northamptonshire Past & Present. 66: 35–36. ISSN 0140-9131. OCLC 6948825116.

=== Other articles and contributions ===
- Contributed drawings and cartography to R L Greenall, A History of Northamptonshire, London: Phillimore, 1979.
- Contributed photographs to Margaret Whinney, Sculpture in Britain, 1530-1830, 2nd edition, New Haven: Yale University Press, 1992.
- Biographical article on Sir Charles Edmund Isham, Oxford Dictionary of National Biography, 2004.
- 'Drayton House and its Marble Buffet: A Reconstruction', article with sketch plan and colour illustration, The Furniture History Society newsletter, May 2008.
