= Ailes House (Crystal Springs, Mississippi) =

Historic house in Mississippi, United States

- U.S. National Register of Historic Places
- Location within Mississippi Location within the United States
- Nearest city: Crystal Springs, Mississippi
- Coordinates: 32°1′30″N 90°22′15″W
- Built: 1860
- Architectural style: Greek Revival
- NRHP reference No.: 91000420
- Added to NRHP: April 9, 1991

Ailes House, also known as Jones House or Chelsealy Farms, in Crystal Springs, Mississippi, is a 1 1/2-story wood-frame house that was built in 1860. It was listed on the National Register of Historic Places in 1991.

It is notable as a well-preserved example of rural Greek Revival architecture that is outstanding for its grand interior proportions and for its surviving original painted decoration.
