= Gatesville Bridge =

- U.S. National Register of Historic Places
- Location within Mississippi
- Nearest city: Gatesville, Mississippi
- Coordinates: 31°59′46″N 90°13′26″W
- Area: less than one acre
- Built: 1908
- Built by: Converse Bridge Co.
- Architectural style: Pennsylvania through truss, Warren pony truss
- MPS: Historic Bridges of Mississippi TR
- NRHP reference No.: 88002482
- Added to NRHP: November 16, 1988

The Gatesville Bridge spans the Pearl River between Copiah County, Mississippi and Simpson County, Mississippi. It was listed on the National Register of Historic Places in 1988.

It brings a county road across the river, east of Gatesville, Mississippi. It has a Pennsylvania truss span and a Warren pony truss span. The bridge was built by the Converse Bridge Co. in 1908.
