= Crystal Springs, Mississippi =

- City
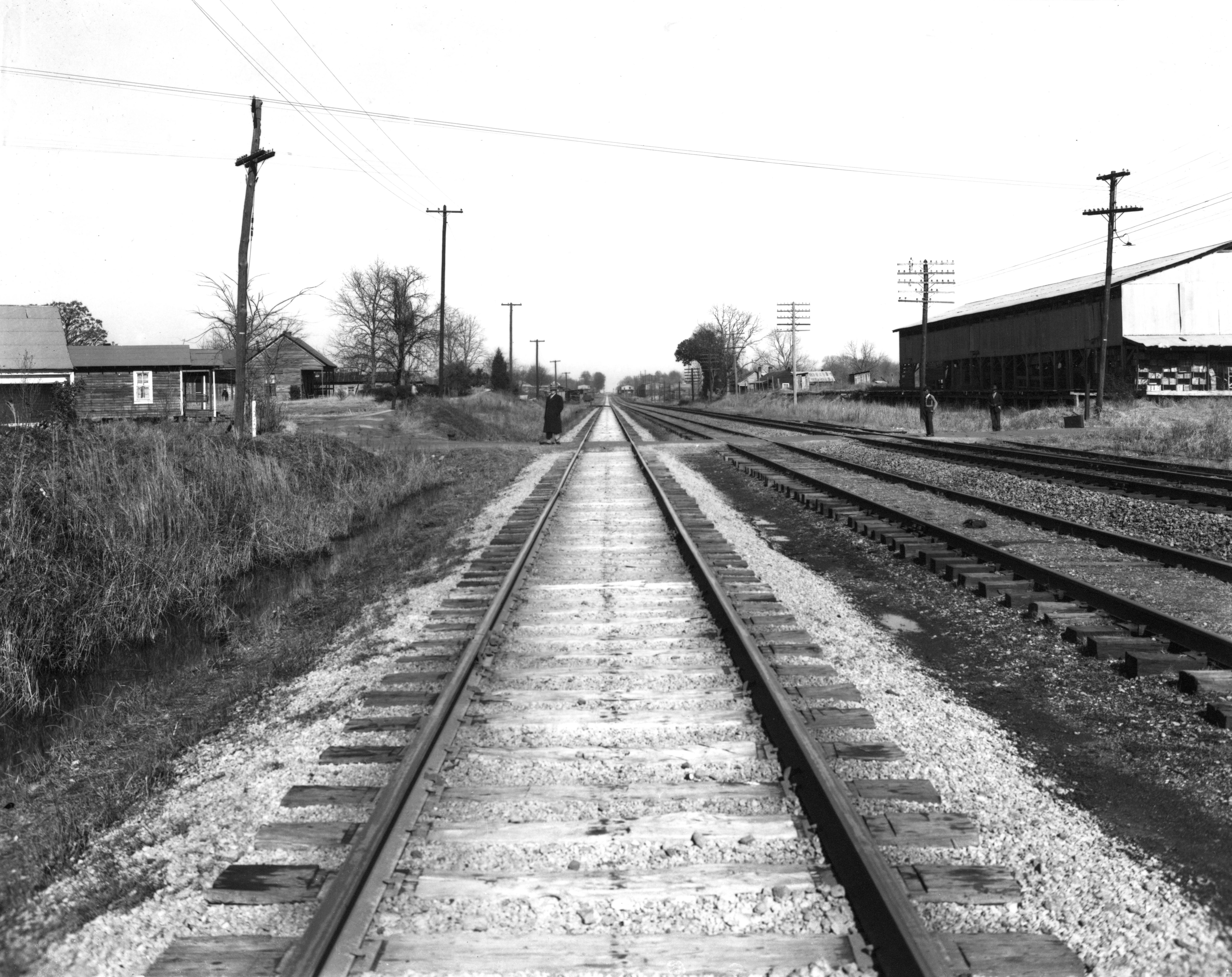
- Crystal Springs, c. 1900-1940

- Flag Logo

- Location of Crystal Springs, Mississippi

- Location in the United States
- Coordinates: 31°59′17″N 90°21′24″W
- Country: United States
- State: Mississippi
- County: Copiah

Area
  - Total: 5.48 sq mi (14.20 km^{2})
  - Land: 5.43 sq mi (14.06 km^{2})
  - Water: 0.054 sq mi (0.14 km^{2})
- Elevation: 469 ft (143 m)

Population (2020)
  - Total: 4,862
  - Density: 895.5/sq mi (345.76/km^{2})
- Time zone: UTC-6 (Central (CST))
  - Summer (DST): UTC-5 (CDT)
- ZIP code: 39059
- Area code: 601
- FIPS code: 28-17060
- GNIS feature ID: 0669000
- Website: cityofcrystalsprings.com

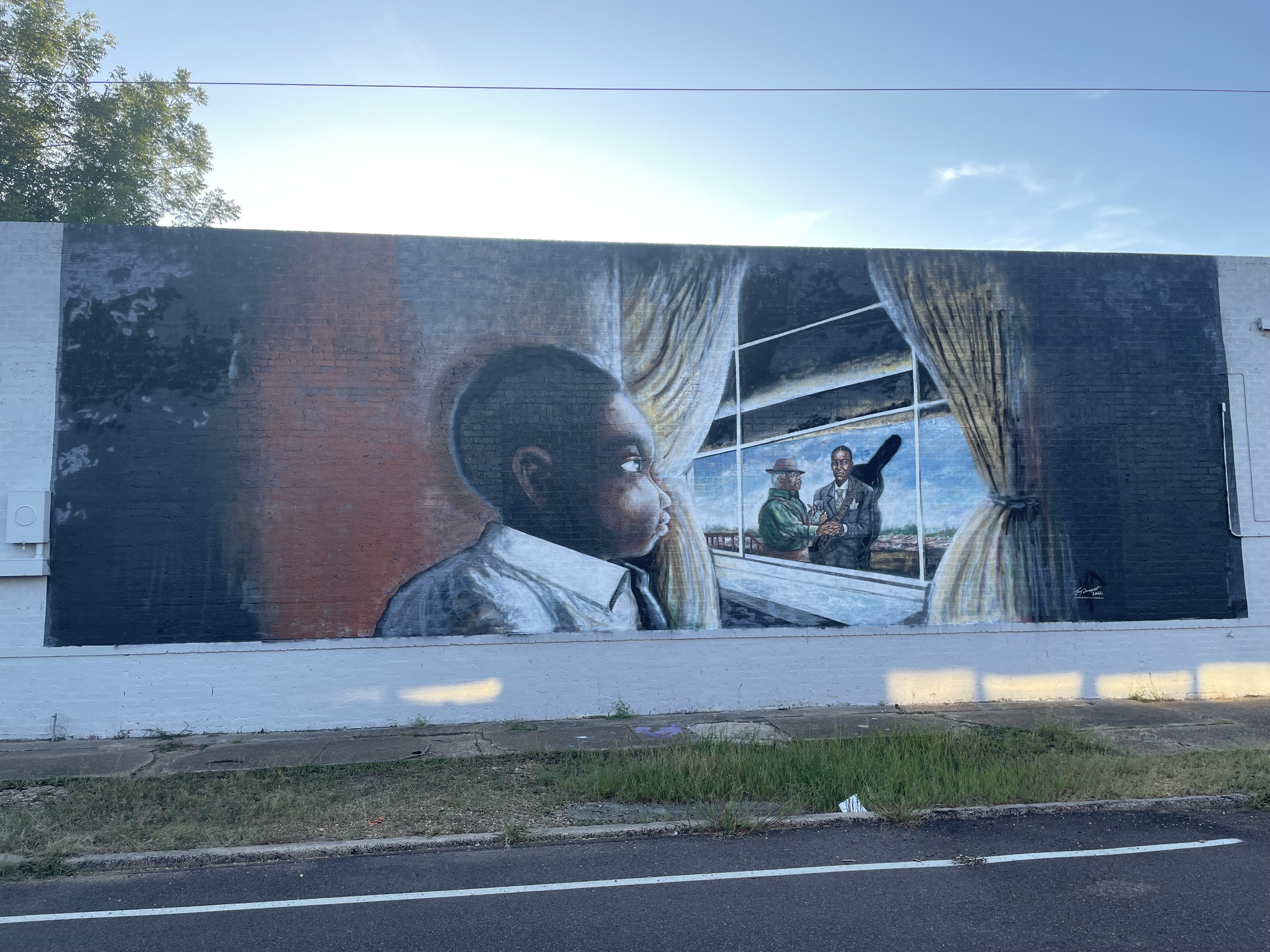
Mural in Crystal Springs, Mississippi

Crystal Springs is a city in Copiah County, Mississippi, United States. As of the 2020 census, the city had a population of 4,862. It is part of the Jackson Metropolitan Statistical Area.

== Geography ==
U.S. Route 51 runs through the northwest part of Crystal Springs, intersecting Interstate 55 at the latter's Exit 72. I-55 leads north 24 miles (39 km) to Jackson, the state capital, and 29 miles (47 km) south to Brookhaven.

According to the United States Census Bureau, the city has a total area of 5.5 square miles (14.2 km^{2}), of which 5.4 square miles (14.1 km^{2}) is land and 0.039 square miles (0.1 km^{2}), or 0.96%, is water.

=== Climate ===
Crystal Springs has a humid subtropical climate (Köppen Cfa) with long, hot summers and short, mild winters.

Climate data for Crystal Springs Experiment Station, Mississippi (1991–2020 normals, extremes 1892–present)
Month	Jan	Feb	Mar	Apr	May	Jun	Jul	Aug	Sep	Oct	Nov	Dec	Year
Record high °F (°C)	89 (32)	86 (30)	94 (34)	93 (34)	101 (38)	104 (40)	107 (42)	108 (42)	107 (42)	100 (38)	91 (33)	87 (31)	108 (42)
Mean maximum °F (°C)	74.6 (23.7)	78.2 (25.7)	83.1 (28.4)	86.2 (30.1)	91.1 (32.8)	95.3 (35.2)	97.3 (36.3)	98.2 (36.8)	95.4 (35.2)	89.9 (32.2)	81.9 (27.7)	76.4 (24.7)	98.2 (36.8)
Mean daily maximum °F (°C)	58.1 (14.5)	62.6 (17.0)	69.5 (20.8)	76.4 (24.7)	83.7 (28.7)	89.9 (32.2)	92.2 (33.4)	92.3 (33.5)	87.8 (31.0)	79.3 (26.3)	68.3 (20.2)	60.8 (16.0)	76.7 (24.8)
Daily mean °F (°C)	47.4 (8.6)	51.3 (10.7)	57.9 (14.4)	64.9 (18.3)	72.7 (22.6)	79.3 (26.3)	81.7 (27.6)	81.5 (27.5)	76.8 (24.9)	66.7 (19.3)	56.4 (13.6)	49.9 (9.9)	65.5 (18.6)
Mean daily minimum °F (°C)	36.7 (2.6)	40.1 (4.5)	46.3 (7.9)	53.4 (11.9)	61.7 (16.5)	68.7 (20.4)	71.3 (21.8)	70.7 (21.5)	65.7 (18.7)	54.1 (12.3)	44.4 (6.9)	39.1 (3.9)	54.4 (12.4)
Mean minimum °F (°C)	19.4 (−7.0)	24.3 (−4.3)	29.2 (−1.6)	37.6 (3.1)	47.5 (8.6)	60.3 (15.7)	65.6 (18.7)	63.9 (17.7)	52.8 (11.6)	38.4 (3.6)	28.2 (−2.1)	23.8 (−4.6)	17.5 (−8.1)
Record low °F (°C)	−2 (−19)	−7 (−22)	12 (−11)	27 (−3)	35 (2)	46 (8)	50 (10)	52 (11)	36 (2)	26 (−3)	14 (−10)	2 (−17)	−7 (−22)
Average precipitation inches (mm)	6.12 (155)	5.87 (149)	5.79 (147)	5.73 (146)	4.42 (112)	5.57 (141)	5.39 (137)	5.76 (146)	3.93 (100)	3.35 (85)	4.65 (118)	5.93 (151)	62.51 (1,588)
Average snowfall inches (cm)	0.1 (0.25)	0.2 (0.51)	0.0 (0.0)	0.0 (0.0)	0.0 (0.0)	0.0 (0.0)	0.0 (0.0)	0.0 (0.0)	0.0 (0.0)	0.0 (0.0)	0.0 (0.0)	0.4 (1.0)	0.7 (1.8)
Average precipitation days (≥ 0.01 in)	8.9	9.0	8.6	7.2	7.2	9.4	9.2	8.6	5.9	5.4	6.9	7.8	94.1
Average snowy days (≥ 0.1 in)	0.1	0.1	0.0	0.0	0.0	0.0	0.0	0.0	0.0	0.0	0.0	0.1	0.3
Source: NOAAIEM

== Demographics ==
Historical population
Census	Pop.	Note	%±
1870	864		—
1880	915		5.9%
1890	997		9.0%
1900	1,093		9.6%
1910	1,343		22.9%
1920	1,395		3.9%
1930	2,257		61.8%
1940	2,855		26.5%
1950	3,676		28.8%
1960	4,496		22.3%
1970	4,195		−6.7%
1980	4,902		16.9%
1990	5,643		15.1%
2000	5,873		4.1%
2010	5,044		−14.1%
2020	4,862		−3.6%
U.S. Decennial Census

=== 2020 census ===
As of the 2020 census, Crystal Springs had a population of 4,862. The median age was 39.2 years. 23.6% of residents were under the age of 18 and 17.7% were 65 years of age or older. For every 100 females there were 82.0 males, and for every 100 females age 18 and over there were 80.2 males age 18 and over.

89.2% of residents lived in urban areas, while 10.8% lived in rural areas.

There were 1,843 households and 982 families in the city. Of all households, 32.0% had children under the age of 18 living in them. 32.2% were married-couple households, 18.9% were households with a male householder and no spouse or partner present, and 42.4% were households with a female householder and no spouse or partner present. About 28.9% of all households were made up of individuals, and 14.0% had someone living alone who was 65 years of age or older.

There were 2,028 housing units, of which 9.1% were vacant. The homeowner vacancy rate was 1.7% and the rental vacancy rate was 7.2%.

Crystal Springs racial composition as of 2020
Race	Num.	Perc.
White (non-Hispanic)	1,464	30.11%
Black or African American (non-Hispanic)	3,007	61.85%
Native American	1	0.02%
Asian	16	0.33%
Pacific Islander	4	0.08%
Other/Mixed	108	2.22%
Hispanic or Latino	262	5.39%

== Education ==
Crystal Springs is served by the Copiah County School District. Copiah Academy is a local private school in the area. Copiah-Lincoln Community College is located in Wesson. The Copiah-Jefferson Regional Library operates a branch in Crystal Springs.

== Controversies ==
On February 2, 1922, Will Thrasher was lynched, the first lynching in Copiah County in 20 years.

Civil rights–era violence related to passage of civil rights legislation in 1964 and 1965, led the armed Deacons for Defense and Justice to established centers in both Crystal Springs and nearby Hazlehurst, in 1966 and 1967. They acted to provide physical protection for African-American protesters who were working with the NAACP on a commercial boycott of white merchants to force integration of stores and employment, to gain jobs for African Americans at places where they were patrons. Eventually the protesters won the removal of discriminatory practices at stores and African Americans gained some jobs in these local businesses.

In 2012, the First Baptist Church denied a black couple permission to be married there after objections from church members. The pastor performed the wedding at a different church.

== Notable people ==
- Hulette F. Aby, former attorney in Tulsa, Oklahoma
- Dexter Allen, blues guitarist
- Bruce M. Bailey, author and humorist
- Joseph W. Bailey, U.S. senator from Texas
- Percy Bland, mayor of Meridian, Mississippi
- Tom Funchess, former professional football offensive tackle
- Larry Grantham, American Football League linebacker and member of the *New York Jets (Super Bowl III champions)
- White Graves, former professional football defensive back
- Pat Harrison, a Democratic member of the *U.S. Congress in the 1920s and 1930s
- Anita C. Hill, Lutheran minister
- Tommy Johnson, Delta blues musician
- George Kinard, former professional football guard
- Phil Redding, former Major League Baseball pitcher for the St. Louis Cardinals
- Hunter Renfroe, professional baseball player
- Alton D. Slay, four-star general in the United States Air Force
- Malcolm Taylor, former professional football defensive end

== See also ==
- List of cities in Mississippi
