= Wesson, Mississippi =

- Town
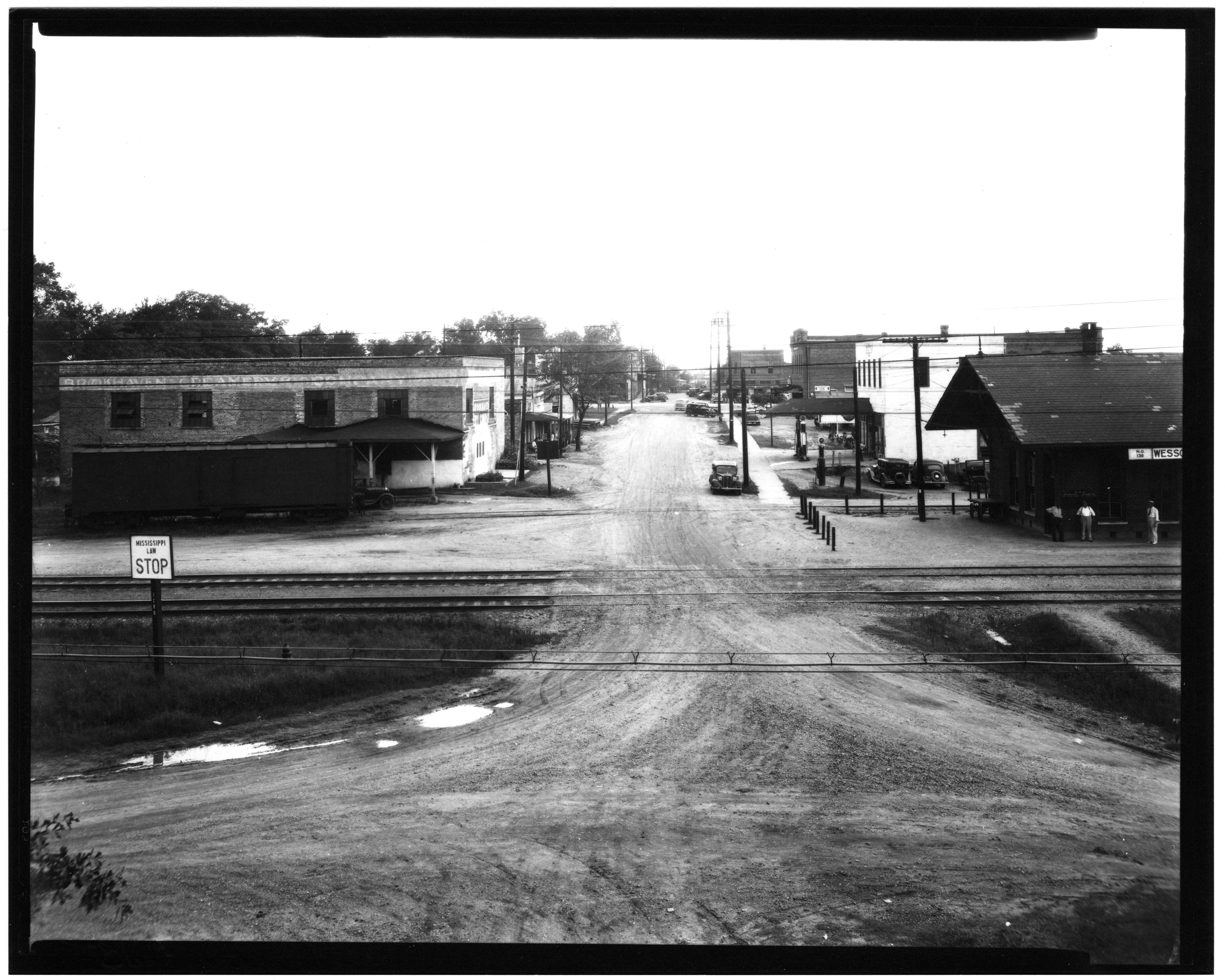
- Wesson in the 1930s

- Flag Logo

- Location of Wesson, Mississippi

- Location in the United States
- Coordinates: 31°41′57″N 90°23′49″W
- Country: United States
- State: Mississippi
- Counties: Copiah, Lincoln

Area
  - Total: 4.51 sq mi (11.67 km^{2})
  - Land: 4.51 sq mi (11.67 km^{2})
  - Water: 0 sq mi (0.00 km^{2})
- Elevation: 466 ft (142 m)

Population (2020)
  - Total: 1,833
  - Density: 406.9/sq mi (157.09/km^{2})
- Time zone: UTC-6 (Central (CST))
  - Summer (DST): UTC-5 (CDT)
- ZIP code: 39191
- Area code: 601
- FIPS code: 28-78640
- GNIS feature ID: 679462
- Website: wessonms.org

Wesson is a town in Copiah and Lincoln counties, Mississippi, United States. As of the 2020 census, Wesson had a population of 1,833. It is part of the Jackson Metropolitan Statistical Area.

== History ==
Settlers began moving to the area in the 1830s, and originally called it Messina.

The town was officially established on March 31, 1864, and renamed after Colonel James Madison Wesson. That year, Col. Wesson established a lumber mill within the town. In 1866, he established the Mississippi Manufacturing Company, a textile mill, within the town. In 1871, he sold the mill to Captain William Oliver and John T. Hardy, who renamed it the Mississippi Mills. The mills were destroyed by fire in 1873, and four new mill buildings were built between 1873 and 1894.

The mills suffered financial difficulties with the death of Captain Oliver in 1891, followed by the economic Panic of 1893. These, among other struggles, lead the mills to close in 1910.

Wesson's first public school was built in 1875, and Copiah-Lincoln Junior College opened in 1928.

== Geography ==
Wesson is located in southernmost Copiah County. Small portions of the town extend south and east into Lincoln County. U.S. Route 51 passes through the town, leading north 11 miles (18 km) to Hazlehurst, the Copiah county seat, and south 9 miles (14 km) to Brookhaven. Exit 48 on Interstate 55 is located 3.5 miles (5.6 km) west of town on Mount Zion Road.

According to the United States Census Bureau, the town has a total area of 4.4 square miles (11.5 km^{2}), all land.

== Demographics ==
Historical population
Census	Pop.	Note	%±
1870	464		—
1880	1,707		267.9%
1890	3,168		85.6%
1900	3,279		3.5%
1910	2,024		−38.3%
1920	885		−56.3%
1930	799		−9.7%
1940	837		4.8%
1950	1,235		47.6%
1960	1,157		−6.3%
1970	1,253		8.3%
1980	1,313		4.8%
1990	1,510		15.0%
2000	1,693		12.1%
2010	1,925		13.7%
2020	1,833		−4.8%
U.S. Decennial Census

=== 2020 census ===
As of the 2020 census, Wesson had a population of 1,833. The median age was 24.4 years. 21.3% of residents were under the age of 18 and 13.1% were 65 years of age or older. For every 100 females, there were 89.9 males, and for every 100 females age 18 and over, there were 87.4 males.

There were 524 households in Wesson, including 373 family households. Of all households, 37.2% had children under the age of 18 living in them, 48.7% were married-couple households, 13.7% were households with a male householder and no spouse or partner present, and 31.1% were households with a female householder and no spouse or partner present. About 23.3% of all households were made up of individuals, and 12.0% had someone living alone who was 65 years of age or older.

There were 589 housing units, of which 11.0% were vacant. The homeowner vacancy rate was 3.6% and the rental vacancy rate was 8.9%. 0.0% of residents lived in urban areas, while 100.0% lived in rural areas.

Wesson racial composition
Race	Num.	Perc.
White (non-Hispanic)	1,329	72.5%
Black or African American (non-Hispanic)	371	20.24%
Native American	3	0.16%
Asian	8	0.44%
Pacific Islander	3	0.16%
Other/Mixed	40	2.18%
Hispanic or Latino	79	4.31%

=== 2000 census ===
As of the census of 2000, there were 1,693 people, 430 households, and 319 families residing in the town. The population density was 736.0 inhabitants per square mile (284.2/km^{2}). There were 471 housing units at an average density of 204.8 per square mile (79.1/km^{2}). The racial makeup of the town was 77.73% White, 19.73% African American, 0.06% Native American, 0.24% Asian, 0.06% Pacific Islander, 1.36% from other races, and 0.83% from two or more races. Hispanic or Latino of any race were 1.83% of the population.

There were 430 households, out of which 36.7% had children under the age of 18 living with them, 56.7% were married couples living together, 14.2% had a female householder with no husband present, and 25.6% were non-families. 23.0% of all households were made up of individuals, and 8.4% had someone living alone who was 65 years of age or older. The average household size was 2.68 and the average family size was 3.14.

In the town, the population was spread out, with 19.6% under the age of 18, 36.1% from 18 to 24, 21.3% from 25 to 44, 15.4% from 45 to 64, and 7.6% who were 65 years of age or older. The median age was 21 years. For every 100 females, there were 94.6 males. For every 100 females age 18 and over, there were 94.6 males.

The median income for a household in the town was $33,021, and the median income for a family was $41,731. Males had a median income of $34,375 versus $19,732 for females. The per capita income for the town was $11,432. About 9.7% of families and 15.1% of the population were below the poverty line, including 18.7% of those under age 18 and 15.0% of those age 65 or over.

== Education ==
=== K-12 education ===
The portion of the Town of Wesson in Copiah County is served by the Copiah County School District. The portion in Lincoln County is in the Lincoln County School District.

Copiah-Lincoln Agricultural High School, through the joint efforts of Copiah and Lincoln counties, was established in the fall of 1915 at Wesson, on the edge of Copiah County. During its early years, the high school was a boarding school, serving the rural districts of those counties. However, as consolidation of local schools progressed within the counties, practically every family in each county had access to an accredited high school. This availability of local schools created a new role for the agricultural school.

In the fall of 1978, the Copiah County superintendent of education assumed responsibility for the high school. It was renamed Wesson High School. During the fall of 1979, Wesson High School was moved to a new facility in Wesson. Eventually it was renamed Wesson Attendance Center.

=== Colleges and universities ===
Copiah-Lincoln Community College provides academic courses equivalent to the first two years of college or university work that can apply to a baccalaureate or professional degree. Co-Lin also offers programs to prepare students for employment and community service, as well as programs for workers to update their skills or learn new ones. The main campus is located in Wesson, while another campus is located in Natchez, and a facility is located in Magee.

Educators in the agricultural high school and in the county public schools became aware that the youth of Copiah and Lincoln counties needed educational opportunities beyond 12th grade. To meet this need, Copiah-Lincoln Community College was organized during the summer of 1928 under the authority of Section 308, Chapter 283, of the General Laws of the State of Mississippi of 1924. Although an enrollment of about 50 students was anticipated that first year, the actual enrollment was more than 90.

Since its establishment in 1928, Copiah-Lincoln has continued to grow and now occupies a prominent position in the state's educational system with an enrollment of over 2,000 and a physical plant valued at more than $35 million.

In 1934, the officials of Simpson County requested an opportunity to join in the rights and benefits of the public junior college. Accordingly, the Copiah-Lincoln Board of Trustees accepted Simpson as a cooperating county.

Since that time four additional counties have joined in the support of Copiah-Lincoln: Franklin County in 1948; Lawrence County in 1965; Jefferson County in 1967; and Adams County in 1971.

Additionally, Copiah County is in the district of Hinds Community College.

== Notable people ==
- Booker Brown, former professional football offensive tackle
- Lawrence R. Ellzey, U.S. Representative from Mississippi's 7th congressional district from 1932 to 1935
- Bertha LaBranche Johnson, educator and clubwoman
- Houston Stackhouse, Delta blues guitarist and singer
