= Copiah County, Mississippi =

County in Mississippi, United States

- County
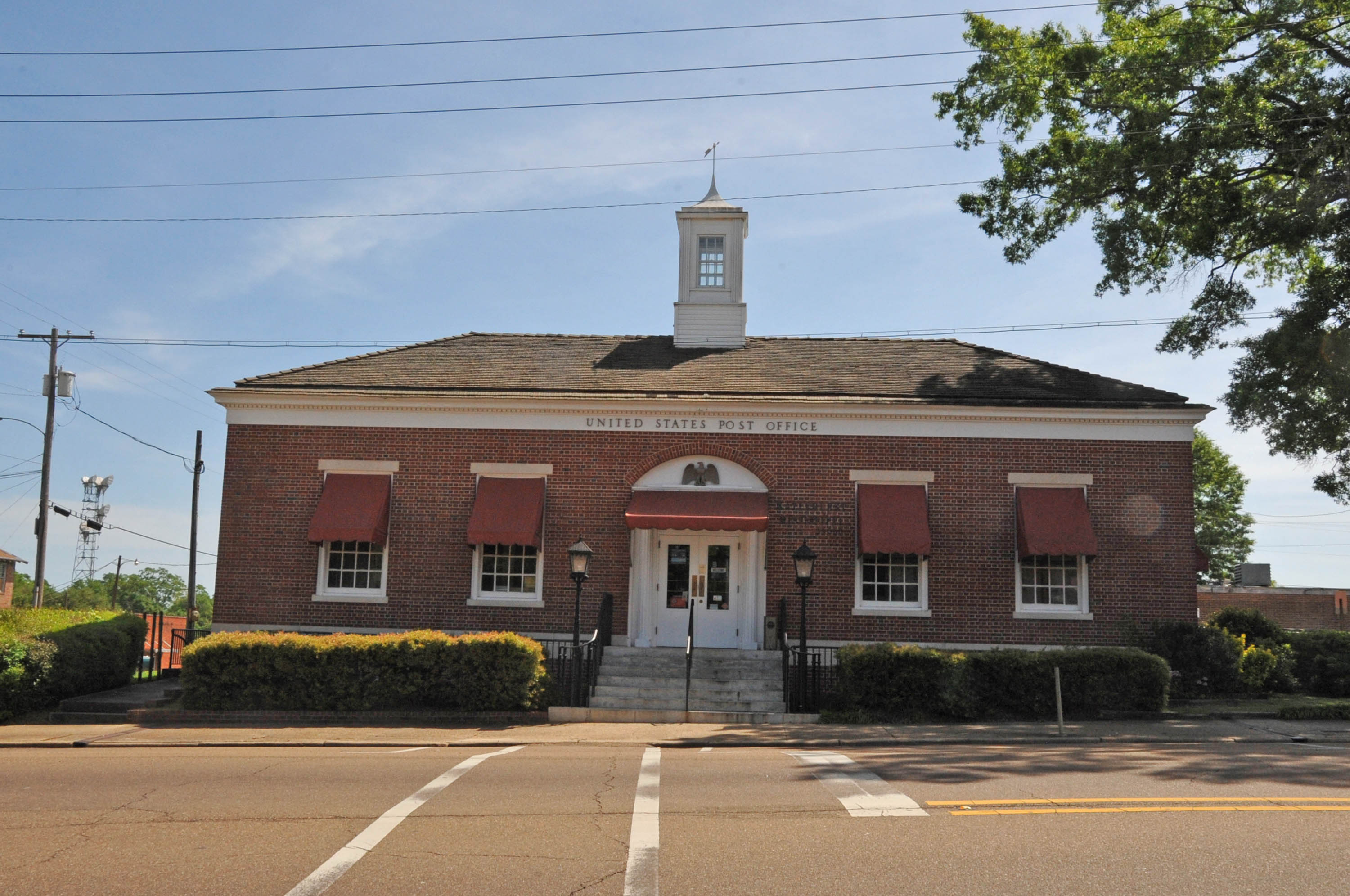
- US Post Office in Hazlehurst

- Location within the U.S. state of Mississippi
- Coordinates: 31°52′N 90°26′W
- Country: United States
- State: Mississippi
- Founded: 1823
- Seat: Hazlehurst
- Largest city: Crystal Springs

Area
  - Total: 779 sq mi (2,020 km^{2})
  - Land: 777 sq mi (2,010 km^{2})
  - Water: 2.2 sq mi (5.7 km^{2}) 0.36%

Population (2020)
  - Total: 28,368
  - Estimate (2025): 27,497 ▼
  - Density: 36.5/sq mi (14.1/km^{2})
- Time zone: UTC−6 (Central)
  - Summer (DST): UTC−5 (CDT)
- Congressional district: 2nd
- Website: www.copiahcountyms.gov

Copiah County is a county located in the U.S. state of Mississippi. As of the 2020 census, the population was 28,368. The county seat is Hazlehurst.

With an eastern border formed by the Pearl River, Copiah County is part of the Jackson, Mississippi metropolitan area.

== History ==
Copiah, from a Choctaw Indian word meaning calling panther, was organized in 1823 as Mississippi's 18th county. In the year of county organization, Walter Leake served as governor and James Monroe as President of the United States. In 2004 Calling Panther Lake, commemorating this name, was opened up just West and North of Crystal Springs near the Jack and New Zion community.

Soon after the Choctaw Indians relinquished their claims to this land in 1819 and the legislature formed Copiah County in 1823, Elisha Lott, a Methodist minister who had worked among the Indians, brought his family from Hancock County to a location near the present site of Crystal Springs. When the New Orleans, Jackson and Great Northern Railroad built in the area in 1858, a new town was created about a mile and a half west of the old settlement. The new settlement took the name Crystal Springs and the old settlement became Old Crystal Springs.

William J. Willing's home was the first to be built in the new town, and Jefferson Davis, president of the Confederacy, once made a speech from the front yard. Ozious Osborne owned the first merchandise store on a corner of his residence lot on south Jackson Street. This lot later became the Merchants Grocery Company's site.

The development of cotton agriculture in the county was based on, and the population was before the Civil War.

The first church built was the Methodist in 1860 in Hazlehurst. It was followed by the Baptist in 1861, Presbyterian in 1870. Trinity Episcopal was built in 1882, during gro of the Episcopal Church. After the American Civil War, most freedmen withdrew from white churches to establish their own independent congregations, setting up state associations of Baptists by the end of the nineteenth century.

The county expanded its production of commercial vegetable crops, known as truck farming, in the 19th and 20th centuries. Crystal Springs developed as one of the largest tomato shipping centers. Its commercial farming started in 1870 when the first shipment of peaches, grown by James Sturgis, was shipped to New Orleans and Chicago markets. Tomatoes were still known as "love apples" when N. Piazza imported seeds from Italy, and with help from S. H. Stackhouse, began scientific cultivation of tomato plants. With the help of German immigrant Augustus Lotterhos, the industry achieved success. In 1878, Lotterhos pooled the products of a number of tomato growers and shipped the first boxcar load to Denver, Colorado.

In the 1960s, Hazlehurst and Crystal Springs were centers of civil rights activism in the southwest part of the state. In addition to working with the Freedom Democratic Party in 1964 on voter registration and education, they organized to make progress after passage of federal civil rights legislation in 1964 and 1965. With the aid of Deacons for Defense and Justice, to protect protesters working with the NAACP on boycotts of merchants in 1966 and 1967 in order to gain integration of public facilities and implement civil rights legislation. The Deacons for Defense had first been organized in Natchez in 1965 to protect African-American protesters, after considerable earlier violence in the state against protesters.

== Geography ==
According to the U.S. Census Bureau, the county has a total area of 779 square miles (2,020 km^{2}), of which 777 square miles (2,010 km^{2}) is land and 2.2 square miles (5.7 km^{2}) (0.3%) is water.

=== Major highways ===
- Interstate 55
- U.S. Highway 51
- Mississippi Highway 18
- Mississippi Highway 27
- Mississippi Highway 28
- Mississippi Highway 844

=== Adjacent counties ===
- Hinds County (north)
- Simpson County (east)
- Lawrence County (southeast)
- Lincoln County (south)
- Jefferson County (southwest)
- Claiborne County (west)

=== National protected area ===
- Homochitto National Forest (part)

== Demographics ==
The mostly rural county has had two periods of marked losses of population during waves of the Great Migration of African Americans out of the rural South: from 1910 to 1920, and from 1940 to 1970. In the first period, most migrants went North, many to St. Louis or Chicago. In the second, they went West, particularly to California where the defense industry had many new jobs and federal policy created opportunities for African Americans in these fields.

Historical population
Census	Pop.	Note	%±
1830	7,001		—
1840	8,954		27.9%
1850	11,794		31.7%
1860	15,398		30.6%
1870	20,608		33.8%
1880	27,552		33.7%
1890	30,233		9.7%
1900	34,395		13.8%
1910	35,914		4.4%
1920	28,672		−20.2%
1930	31,614		10.3%
1940	33,974		7.5%
1950	30,493		−10.2%
1960	27,051		−11.3%
1970	24,749		−8.5%
1980	26,503		7.1%
1990	27,592		4.1%
2000	28,757		4.2%
2010	29,449		2.4%
2020	28,368		−3.7%
2025 (est.)	27,497	▼	−3.1%
U.S. Decennial Census; 1790–1960 1900–1990; 1990–2000 2010–2013

=== Racial and ethnic composition ===
Copiah County, Mississippi – Racial and ethnic composition Note: the US Census treats Hispanic/Latino as an ethnic category. This table excludes Latinos from the racial categories and assigns them to a separate category. Hispanics/Latinos may be of any race.
Race / Ethnicity (NH = Non-Hispanic)	Pop 1980	Pop 1990	Pop 2000	Pop 2010	Pop 2020	% 1980	% 1990	% 2000	% 2010	% 2020
White alone (NH)	13,540	13,553	13,627	13,399	12,171	51.09%	49.12%	47.39%	45.50%	42.90%
Black or African American alone (NH)	12,656	13,885	14,577	14,924	14,264	47.75%	50.32%	50.69%	50.68%	50.28%
Native American or Alaska Native alone (NH)	10	21	19	51	17	0.04%	0.08%	0.07%	0.17%	0.06%
Asian alone (NH)	14	25	43	89	121	0.05%	0.09%	0.15%	0.30%	0.43%
Native Hawaiian or Pacific Islander alone (NH)	x	x	3	3	24	x	x	0.01%	0.01%	0.08%
Other race alone (NH)	7	0	13	15	43	0.03%	0.00%	0.05%	0.05%	0.15%
Mixed race or Multiracial (NH)	x	x	143	195	617	x	x	0.50%	0.66%	2.17%
Hispanic or Latino (any race)	276	108	332	773	1,111	1.04%	0.39%	1.15%	2.62%	3.92%
Total	26,503	27,592	28,757	29,449	28,368	100.00%	100.00%	100.00%	100.00%	100.00%

=== 2020 census ===
As of the 2020 census, the county had a population of 28,368. The median age was 40.5 years. 22.2% of residents were under the age of 18 and 18.0% of residents were 65 years of age or older. For every 100 females there were 91.6 males, and for every 100 females age 18 and over there were 89.3 males age 18 and over.

The racial makeup of the county was 43.4% White, 50.6% Black or African American, 0.2% American Indian and Alaska Native, 0.4% Asian, 0.1% Native Hawaiian and Pacific Islander, 2.5% from some other race, and 2.9% from two or more races. Hispanic or Latino residents of any race comprised 3.9% of the population.

17.8% of residents lived in urban areas, while 82.2% lived in rural areas.

There were 10,899 households in the county, of which 30.6% had children under the age of 18 living in them. Of all households, 39.5% were married-couple households, 20.4% were households with a male householder and no spouse or partner present, and 35.1% were households with a female householder and no spouse or partner present. About 29.1% of all households were made up of individuals and 13.2% had someone living alone who was 65 years of age or older.

There were 12,380 housing units, of which 12.0% were vacant. Among occupied housing units, 75.1% were owner-occupied and 24.9% were renter-occupied. The homeowner vacancy rate was 1.1% and the rental vacancy rate was 9.1%.

== Tomato Festival ==
The county is known as a tomato and cabbage producing area, and for many years was called the "Tomato Capital of the World." Specifically, Crystal Springs was known as "The Tomato Capital of the World" because for a few years in the late 1930s it canned and shipped out via rail car more tomatoes than any other locale. Its predominance was disrupted by the onset of World War II but it kept the title.

In June 2000, the town revived celebration of an annual Tomato Festival, held on the last Saturday in June. It includes a tomato growing contest (with prizes for largest tomato, ugliest tomato, prettiest tomato, etc.), tomato tasting, farmers' market, vendor's booths, musical entertainment, 5K run and, of course, the crowning of the new Tomato Queen. The Tomato Festival was originally set up on Front Street.

The Friday night before the Tomato Festival, a Street Dance is held as the kick-off event. It is the night of the crowning of the Tomato Queen. Entertainment includes a live band, games and amusement rides for the kids, and food vendors. During the Street Dance, "BBQ and Blue Jeans" is sponsored by the Junior Auxiliary of Crystal Springs. They sell take-out containers filled with BBQ sandwiches, potato salad, baked beans and a dinner roll. This is the evening when other festival vendors start setting up their booths for the main day events. Vendors come from all over the U.S. to the festival every year to sell their wares, and provide games and amusement rides. A tomato museum at the Chautauqua Park Visitor Center exhibits historical pictures, agricultural relics from the era, and examples of some of the shipping and canning labels.

== Education ==
There are two school districts in the county: Copiah County School District and Hazlehurst City School District.

There is a private school, Copiah Academy.

The county is in the district of Copiah–Lincoln Community College. Additionally, the county is in the district of Hinds Community College.

== Communities ==
=== Cities ===
- Crystal Springs
- Hazlehurst (county seat)

=== Towns ===
- Georgetown
- Wesson (partly located in Lincoln County)

=== Village ===
- Beauregard

=== Unincorporated communities ===
- Carpenter
- Conn
- Dentville
- Gallman
- Glancy
- Hopewell
- Martinsville
- Midway
- Rockport
- Ruby
- Sand Hill

=== Ghost town ===
- Coars Springs

== Politics ==
Copiah County is a swing county. Since 1968 it has supported the Democratic presidential candidate 7 times and the Republican candidate 7 times. More recently, the county favored Democratic candidates beginning in the Obama era and beyond, until Donald Trump flipped it back into the Republican column in 2024.

United States presidential election results for Copiah County, Mississippi
Year	Republican		Democratic		Third party(ies)	
Year	No.	%	No.	%	No.	%
1912	10	0.77%	1,234	94.78%	58	4.45%
1916	20	1.32%	1,486	98.22%	7	0.46%
1920	60	4.37%	1,300	94.61%	14	1.02%
1924	43	2.02%	2,087	97.98%	0	0.00%
1928	161	5.56%	2,733	94.44%	0	0.00%
1932	28	1.17%	2,371	98.67%	4	0.17%
1936	45	1.84%	2,397	98.12%	1	0.04%
1940	49	2.06%	2,335	97.94%	0	0.00%
1944	85	3.41%	2,409	96.59%	0	0.00%
1948	19	0.72%	89	3.38%	2,523	95.90%
1952	1,527	42.69%	2,050	57.31%	0	0.00%
1956	387	16.80%	1,270	55.12%	647	28.08%
1960	761	21.06%	896	24.79%	1,957	54.15%
1964	4,506	94.96%	239	5.04%	0	0.00%
1968	704	8.40%	2,724	32.51%	4,951	59.09%
1972	5,498	73.11%	1,803	23.98%	219	2.91%
1976	4,108	47.51%	4,267	49.35%	271	3.13%
1980	4,461	43.99%	5,517	54.41%	162	1.60%
1984	5,806	55.74%	4,591	44.08%	19	0.18%
1988	5,100	54.64%	4,175	44.73%	59	0.63%
1992	4,600	48.68%	4,397	46.53%	452	4.78%
1996	4,138	46.23%	4,415	49.33%	397	4.44%
2000	5,643	53.30%	4,845	45.76%	99	0.94%
2004	6,374	55.97%	4,961	43.56%	53	0.47%
2008	6,701	46.21%	7,710	53.17%	91	0.63%
2012	6,282	44.48%	7,749	54.87%	92	0.65%
2016	6,103	47.01%	6,741	51.93%	138	1.06%
2020	6,250	48.51%	6,470	50.22%	163	1.27%
2024	6,134	52.58%	5,426	46.52%	105	0.90%

== See also ==
- National Register of Historic Places listings in Copiah County, Mississippi
