= Hazlehurst, Mississippi =

- City
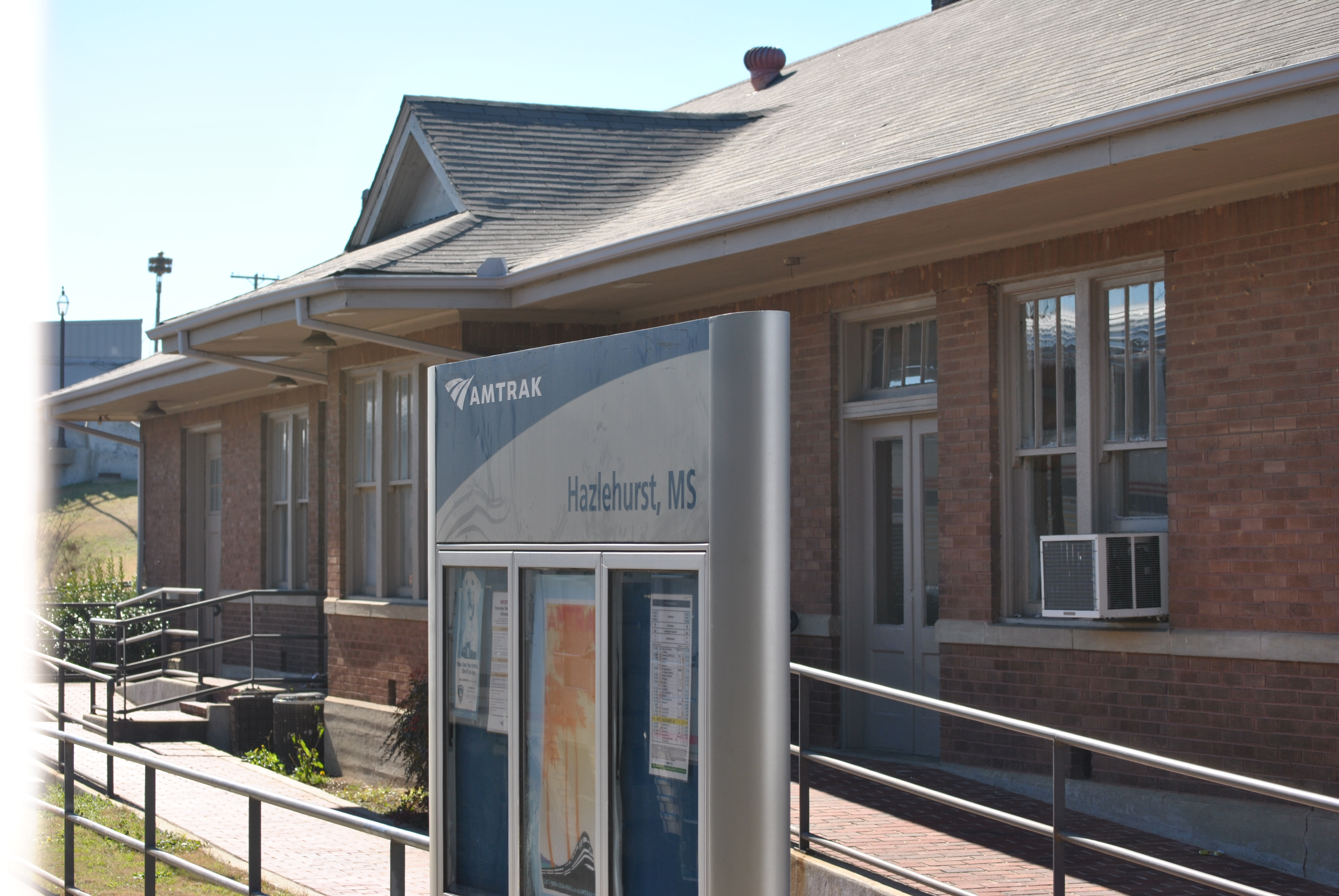
- Amtrak station at Hazlehurst

- Flag

- Location of Hazlehurst, Mississippi

- Location in the United States
- Coordinates: 31°51′54″N 90°23′29″W
- Country: United States
- State: Mississippi
- County: Copiah

Area
  - Total: 4.47 sq mi (11.59 km^{2})
  - Land: 4.43 sq mi (11.47 km^{2})
  - Water: 0.046 sq mi (0.12 km^{2})
- Elevation: 476 ft (145 m)

Population (2020)
  - Total: 3,619
  - Density: 816.9/sq mi (315.39/km^{2})
- Time zone: UTC-6 (Central (CST))
  - Summer (DST): UTC-5 (CDT)
- ZIP code: 39083
- Area code: 601
- FIPS code: 28-31220
- GNIS feature ID: 0671047

Hazlehurst is a city in and the county seat of Copiah County, Mississippi, United States, located about 30 miles (48 km) south of the state capital Jackson along Interstate 55. As of the 2020 census, Hazlehurst had a population of 3,619. It is part of the Jackson Metropolitan Statistical Area. Its economy is based on agriculture, particularly tomatoes and cabbage.

== History ==
The first settlement here by European Americans became known as the town of Gallatin; two lawyers and brothers-in-law named Walters and Saunders came from Gallatin, Tennessee, in 1819 and named the village after their hometown. They built their homes on the banks of the Bayou Pierre, in the western part of Copiah County. Other settlers came with them, and in 1829 the state legislature incorporated the town. The incorporation charter of Gallatin was repealed on January 18, 1862.

The construction of the New Orleans, Jackson and Great Northern Railroad began on November 3, 1865, stimulating development of Hazlehurst at the railway stop. It was named for Col. George H. Hazlehurst, an engineer for the new railroad. A city in Georgia is also named for him.

As Hazlehurst grew, Gallatin declined into a settlement at a crossroads. In April 1872, the legislature ordered the county board of supervisors to hold an election to decide whether the county seat should be moved from Gallatin to Hazlehurst. After a majority voted for the change, Gallatin's old brick courthouse was torn down and reassembled in Hazlehurst

This city had civil rights activity during the mid-1960s. Because of violence against black people in this area, Mississippi, the armed Deacons for Defense and Justice established centers here and in nearby Crystal Springs in 1966 and 1967. They provided physical protection for protesters working with the NAACP on a commercial boycott of white merchants to force integration of facilities and employment, and to gain jobs for African Americans following passage of civil rights legislation in 1964.

On January 23, 1969, an F4 tornado devastated the south side of Hazlehurst, killing 11 people in town and damaging or destroying 175 homes.

== Geography ==
Hazlehurst is located slightly east of the center of Copiah County. U.S. Route 51 passes through the center of the city, leading north 9 miles (14 km) to Crystal Springs and south 20 miles (32 km) to Brookhaven. Interstate 55 runs west of and generally parallel to US 51, with access to Hazlehurst from exits 59 and 61. Mississippi Highway 28 crosses US 51 and I-55 in the northern part of town, leading east 14 miles (23 km) to Georgetown and west 46 miles (74 km) to Fayette.

According to the United States Census Bureau, Hazlehurst has a total area of 4.4 square miles (11.5 km^{2}), of which 4.4 square miles (11.3 km^{2}) is land and 0.04 square miles (0.1 km^{2}), or 1.02%, is water.

== Demographics ==
Historical population
Census	Pop.	Note	%±
1870	662		—
1880	463		−30.1%
1900	1,579		—
1910	2,056		30.2%
1920	1,762		−14.3%
1930	2,447		38.9%
1940	3,124		27.7%
1950	3,397		8.7%
1960	3,400		0.1%
1970	4,577		34.6%
1980	4,437		−3.1%
1990	4,221		−4.9%
2000	4,400		4.2%
2010	4,009		−8.9%
2020	3,619		−9.7%
U.S. Decennial Census

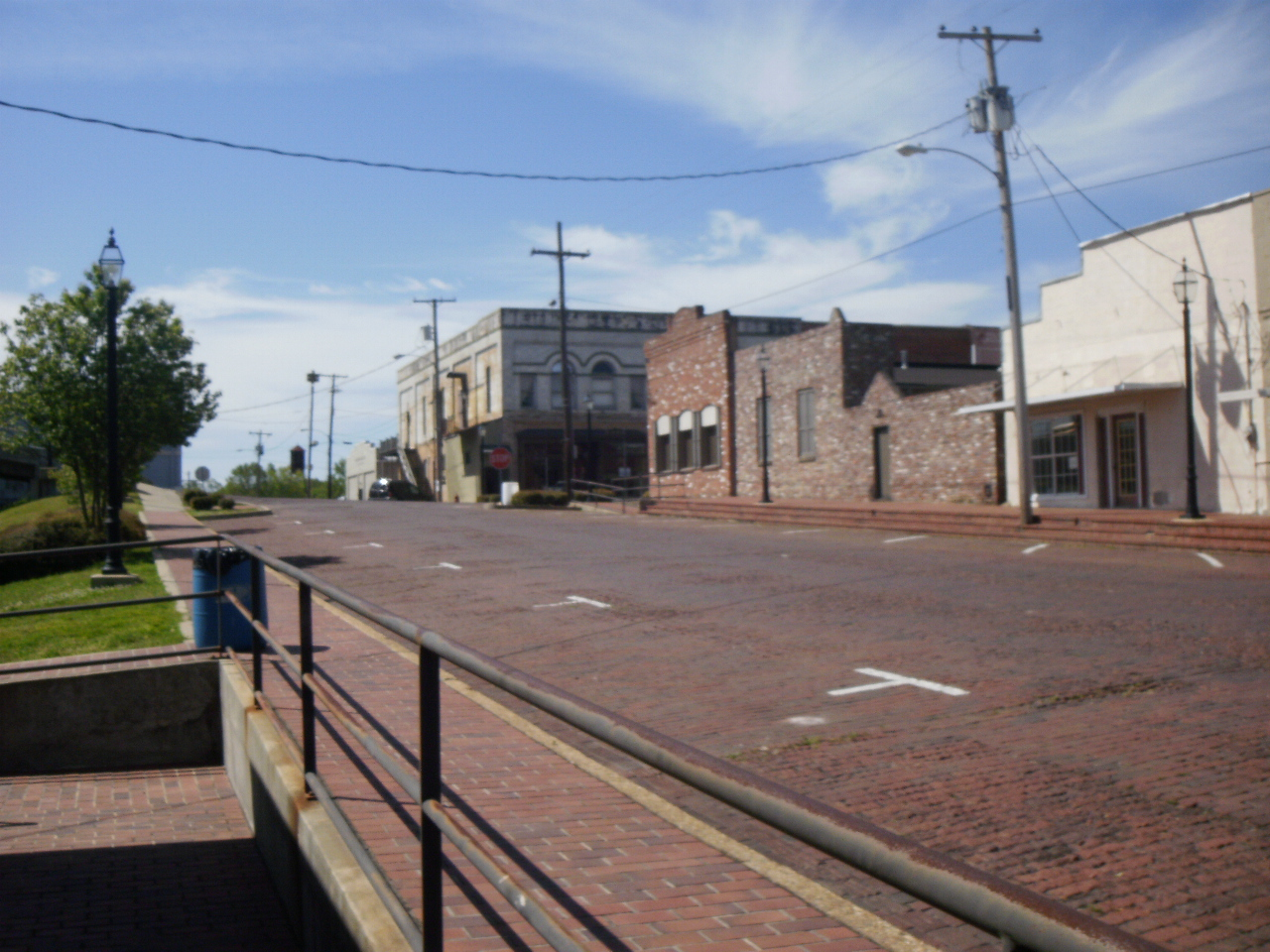
Downtown Hazlehurst, Mississippi in 2013

=== Racial and ethnic composition ===
Hazlehurst city, Mississippi – Racial and ethnic composition Note: the US Census treats Hispanic/Latino as an ethnic category. This table excludes Latinos from the racial categories and assigns them to a separate category. Hispanics/Latinos may be of any race.
Race / Ethnicity (NH = Non-Hispanic)	Pop 2000	Pop 2010	Pop 2020	% 2000	% 2010	% 2020
White alone (NH)	1,245	665	461	28.30%	16.59%	12.74%
Black or African American alone (NH)	2,998	2,991	2,744	68.14%	74.61%	75.82%
Native American or Alaska Native alone (NH)	1	14	2	0.02%	0.35%	0.06%
Asian alone (NH)	21	31	30	0.48%	0.77%	0.83%
Native Hawaiian or Pacific Islander alone (NH)	0	1	3	0.00%	0.02%	0.08%
Other race alone (NH)	2	3	4	0.05%	0.07%	0.11%
Mixed race or Multiracial (NH)	43	28	102	0.98%	0.70%	2.82%
Hispanic or Latino (any race)	90	276	273	2.05%	6.88%	7.54%
Total	4,400	4,009	3,619	100.00%	100.00%	100.00%

=== 2020 census ===
As of the 2020 census, there were 3,619 people, 1,108 households, and 743 families residing in the city. The median age was 39.1 years. 24.2% of residents were under the age of 18 and 17.6% of residents were 65 years of age or older. For every 100 females, there were 85.7 males, and for every 100 females age 18 and over, there were 81.7 males age 18 and over.

0.0% of residents lived in urban areas, while 100.0% lived in rural areas.

Of households in Hazlehurst, 33.9% had children under the age of 18 living in them. Of all households, 27.2% were married-couple households, 21.9% were households with a male householder and no spouse or partner present, and 46.0% were households with a female householder and no spouse or partner present. About 31.2% of all households were made up of individuals, and 13.0% had someone living alone who was 65 years of age or older.

There were 1,595 housing units, of which 13.4% were vacant. The homeowner vacancy rate was 2.2% and the rental vacancy rate was 9.6%.

== Education ==
The city is served by the Hazlehurst City School District. The Copiah-Jefferson Regional Library main offices are in Hazlehurst, as well as the main office of Copiah County School District.

== Infrastructure ==
=== Rail transportation ===
Amtrak, the national passenger rail system, provides service to Hazlehurst. Amtrak Train 59, the southbound City of New Orleans, is scheduled to depart Hazlehurst at 11:55 am daily with service to Brookhaven, McComb, Hammond, and New Orleans. Amtrak Train 58, the northbound City of New Orleans, is scheduled to depart Hazlehurst at 4:17 pm daily with service to Jackson, Yazoo City, Greenwood, Memphis, Newbern-Dyersburg, Fulton, Carbondale, Centralia, Effingham, Mattoon, Champaign-Urbana, Kankakee, Homewood, and Chicago.

== Notable people ==
- Joe Bailey (1863-1929), an attorney and US Senator from Texas, lived and worked in Hazlehurst before moving.
- Houston Boines, blues singer and harmonica player
- Alvin Chester Cockrell Jr.; awarded a Navy Cross in World War II
- Max Dale Cooper, immunologist and Professor of Pathology at Emory University known for identifying T cells and B cells
- Clifford Davis, U.S. Representative from Tennessee from 1940 to 1965
- Mablean Ephriam, adjudicator of the courtroom series Divorce Court for seven seasons from the 1999–2006 season
- John Epperson, actor and singer best known for his performance as Lypsinka; born in Hazlehurst
- Robert Evans, member of the Mississippi House of Representatives
- Ron Franklin, sportscaster
- Ben Garry, NFL player
- Beth Henley, playwright, was born in Jackson but spent much of her childhood here, as it was where her father grew up. Her Pulitzer Prize-winning play, Crimes of the Heart, is set in Hazlehurst.
- William Hester, tennis player and official. Former president of the United States Tennis Association.
- Roy Hilton, former professional football defensive end
- Gregory Holloway Sr., member of the Mississippi House of Representatives
- Ruth Atkinson Holmes, painter and philanthropist
- Robert Johnson, the Delta blues musician, was born in Hazlehurst. A monument to him was installed between the Copiah County courthouse and the Trustmark Bank. Johnson's birth home is located near the courthouse; the City of Hazlehurst is in litigation to determine its future.
- Rory Lee, pastor of Antioch Baptist Church in Hazlehurst from 1976 to 1994; president of two Southern Baptist colleges
- Print Matthews, former sheriff of Copiah County
- Benjamin Morgan Palmer, 19th-century Presbyterian minister, made Hazlehurst his family's home in the summer of 1862 as he served as chaplain with the Washington Artillery of New Orleans.
- Lawrence Pillers, former professional football defensive end
- Mary Tillman Smith, outsider artist
- Truett Smith, former professional football blocking back
- Lewis Tillman, professional football player
- Walter Washington, former president of Alcorn State University and Alpha Phi Alpha
- H. Lynn Womack, publisher
