= National Register of Historic Places listings in Franklin County, Mississippi =

Location of Franklin County in Mississippi

This is a list of the National Register of Historic Places listings in Franklin County, Mississippi.

This is intended to be a complete list of the properties and districts on the National Register of Historic Places in Franklin County, Mississippi, United States. Latitude and longitude coordinates are provided for many National Register properties and districts; these locations may be seen together in a map.

There are 5 properties and districts listed on the National Register in the county.

This National Park Service list is complete through NPS recent listings posted March 14, 2025.

== Current listings ==
	Name on the Register	Image	Date listed	Location	City or town	Description
1	Charles Walton Beam House		March 21, 1990 (#90000437)	Junction of Bogue Chitto-Meadville Road and Upper Meadville-Summit Road, 7 miles (11 kilometers) south of McCall Creek; 31°25′10″N 90°40′54″W	McCall Creek	Constructed c. 1857
2	Clear Springs Recreation Area		October 28, 1999 (#99001282)	Area of Clear Springs Lake; 31°25′27″N 90°59′12″W	Roxie	Constructed c. 1937
3	Eddiceton Bridge		November 16, 1988 (#88002404)	Spans the Homochitto River on a county road 31°29′35″N 90°47′22″W	Eddiceton	Constructed in 1909, brings Burris Road across Homochitto River in two spans: a 151-foot (46 m) Pratt through truss and a 186-foot (57 m) Camelback through truss.
4	Franklin County Courthouse	Franklin County Courthouse	December 17, 1981 (#81000327)	Courthouse Square; 31°28′20″N 90°53′35″W	Meadville	Constructed from 1913 to 1914
5	Lucien Bridge		June 16, 2005 (#05000611)	Over McCall Creek, on Stewart Road, at Lucien; 31°30′40″N 90°39′59″W	Lucien	Constructed in 1938

== See also ==
- List of National Historic Landmarks in Mississippi
- National Register of Historic Places listings in Mississippi
