= Mississippi Highway 33 =

Highway in Mississippi

Mississippi Highway 33

Route information
- Maintained by MDOT
- Length: 55.7 mi (89.6 km) (44.959 mi excluding councurrencies)
- Existed: 1950–present

Major junctions
- South end: LA 19 at the Louisiana state line near Centreville
- US 84 in Roxie
- North end: US 61 / MS 28 in Fayette

Location
- Country: United States
- State: Mississippi
- Counties: Jefferson, Franklin, Amite, Wilkinson

Highway system
- Mississippi State Highway System; Interstate; US; State
← MS 32	→ MS 35

Mississippi Highway 33 (MS 33) is a state highway in southwestern Mississippi. It runs from north to south for 55.7 miles (89.6 km) and serves the counties of Jefferson, Franklin, Amite, and Wilkinson.

== Route description ==
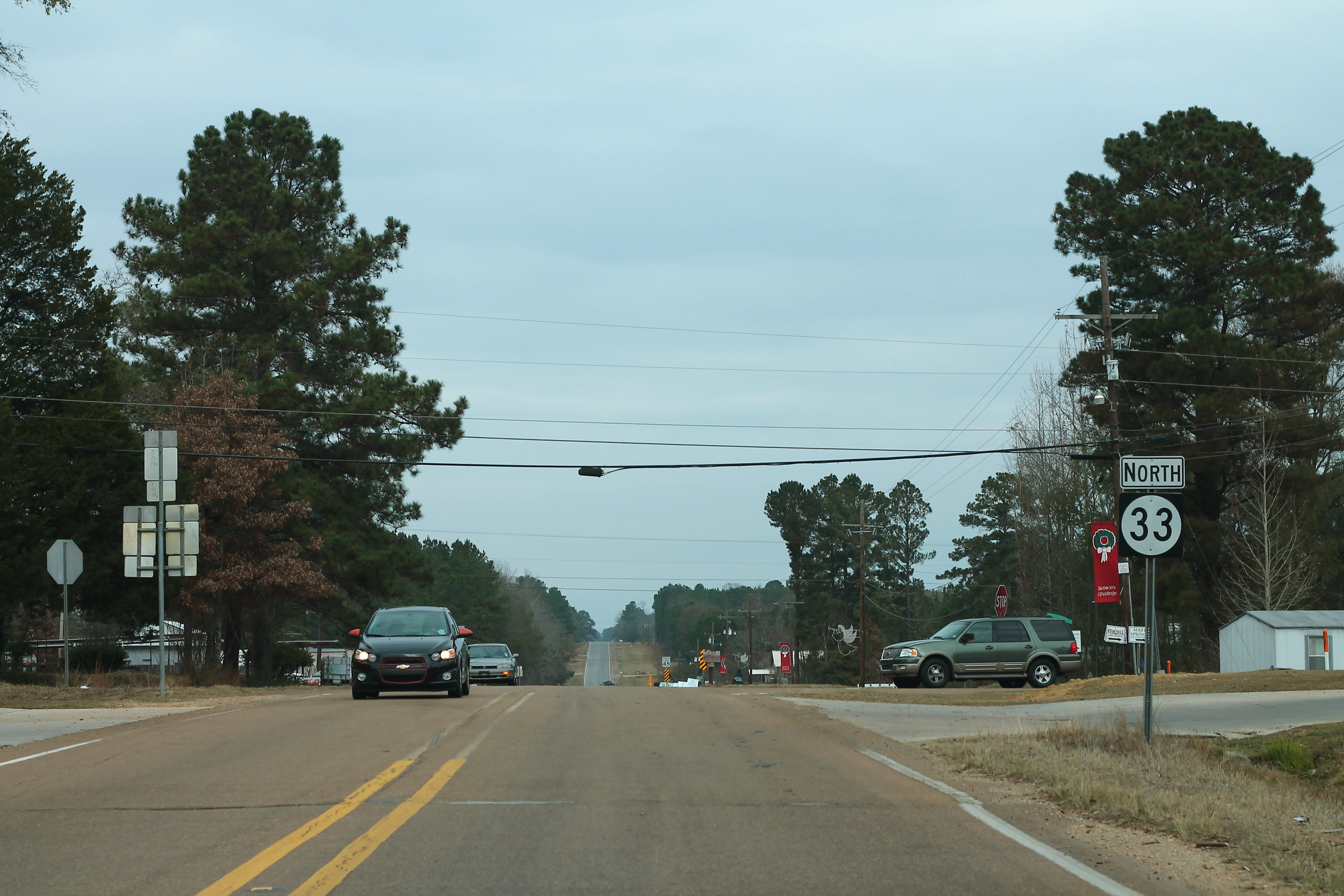
Mississippi Highway 33 in Gloster

MS 33 begins in Wilkinson County at the Louisiana state line, with it continuing south as Louisiana Highway 19 (LA 19) into Norwood. It heads north through woodlands, then farmland for several miles, passing through Whitaker before entering the Centreville city limits and becoming concurrent (overlapped) with MS 24. The highway heads east through a business district as it bypasses downtown along its southern side and crosses into neighboring Amite County, where they have an intersection with MS 48, before leaving Centreville and heading due north through farmland for several miles. MS 24/MS 33 travel through the town of Gloster, bypassing downtown along its eastern side before MS 24 splits off and heads east while MS 33 heads north to enter the Homochitto National Forest. MS 33 winds its way northwest through hilly remote woodlands for several miles before exiting the forest and straddles the county line with Wilkinson County as it passes through the community of Coles, the town of Crosby, has an intersection with MS 563, and passes through the community of Rosetta before crossing the Homochitto River into Franklin County.

MS 33 immediately re-enters the National Forest for the next several miles, exiting only briefly at times to pass through the communities of Knoxville, Franklin, and the town of Roxie, where it has an intersection with US 84 (formerly also part of US 98). The highway travels through more remote woodlands of the forest for several miles to pass through the community of Hamburg to cross into Jefferson County.

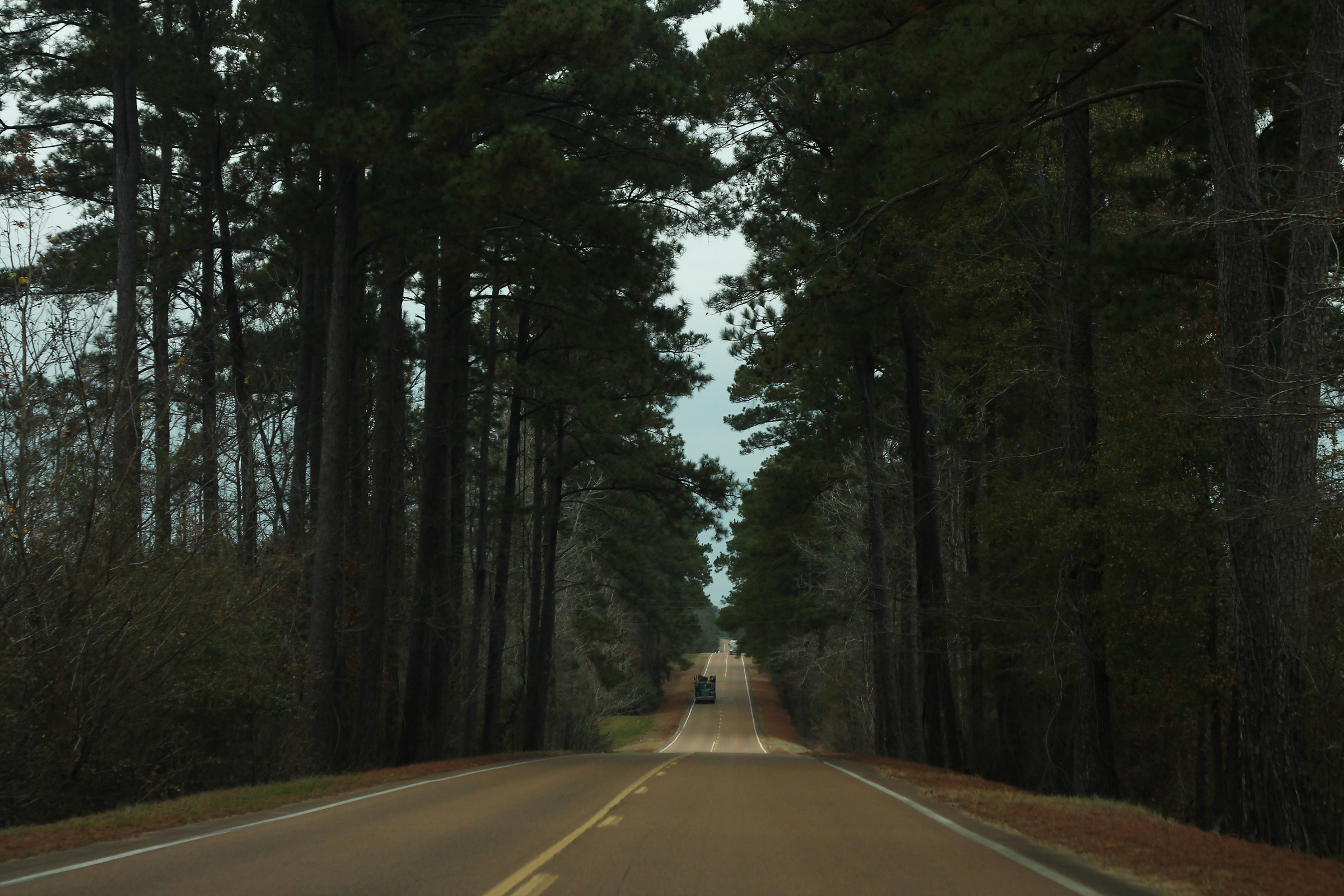
MS 33 inside the Homochitto National Forest near Fayette

MS 33 passes through the community of McNair before exiting the National Forest and becoming concurrent with MS 28. The highway enters the Fayette city limits and passes by several homes and businesses, bypassing downtown along its western side before both MS 33 and MS 28 come to an end at an intersection with US 61.

The entire route of Mississippi Highway 33 is a rural two-lane highway.

== History ==
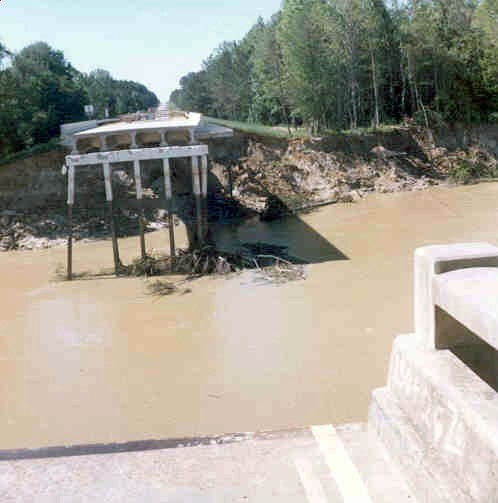
Mississippi Highway 33 bridge failure just north of Rosetta, Mississippi, caused by the April 1974 flood on the Homochitto River.

In April 1974, the bridge on MS 33 over the Homochitto River in Rosetta was washed out during a flood on the river that year. This was due to many flood control projects on the river by the U.S. Army Corps of Engineers, beginning in 1938 with the construction of the Abernathy Channel, and continuing until 1952 with channelizing and straightening out the lower portion of the river. This resulted in increased stream flow velocity, causing accelerated erosion and scour, which in turn leads to bank instability. All this caused bridges to wash out along the lower portion of the river during floods, beginning in a 1955 flood with the US 61 bridge in Kingston, the Illinois Central Railroad bridge at Rosetta, and a country road bridge on the tributary Second Creek. In 1969 a bridge on the tributary Crooked Creek was washed out, and in 1971 the MS 33 bridge at Rosetta was washed out. During the flood of 1974 both the MS 33 bridge and the Illinois Central bridge at Rosetta were washed out.

== Major intersections ==
County	Location	mi	km	Destinations	Notes
Wilkinson		0.0	0.0	LA 19 south – Baton Rouge	Louisiana state line; southern terminus
Wilkinson	Centreville	6.0	9.7	MS 24 west / Camp Street – Woodville, Natchez, Centreville	South end of MS 24 overlap
Amite	Centreville	7.0	11.3	E Joseph Street (MS 946 west) – Downtown Centreville	Eastern terminus of unsigned MS 946
Amite		8.3	13.4	MS 48 east / East Howard Street – Liberty, McComb, Centreville	Western terminus of MS 48
Amite	Gloster	15.5	24.9	E Tate Street (MS 911 north) – Downtown Gloster	Southern terminus of unsigned MS 911
Amite	Gloster	15.9	25.6	E Main Street (MS 913 north) – Downtown Gloster	Southern terminus of unsigned MS 913
Amite	Gloster	16.3	26.2	MS 24 east – Liberty	North end of MS 24 overlap
Wilkinson	No major junctions				
Amite	No major junctions				
Wilkinson		25.3	40.7	MS 563 south	Northern terminus of MS 563
Franklin	Knoxville	32.4	52.1	Bunkley Road – Knoxville	
Franklin	Roxie	41.9	67.4	US 84 – Natchez, Brookhaven	
Franklin	Hamburg	46.5	74.8	Hamburg Road – Hamburg	
Jefferson	McNair	51.1	82.2	McNair Road – McNair	
Jefferson	Fayette	54.8	88.2	MS 28 east – Hazlehurst	South end of MS 28 overlap
Jefferson	Fayette	55.6	89.5	Main Street - Fayette	Former US 61
Jefferson	Fayette	55.7	89.6	US 61 / MS 28 ends – Natchez, Port Gibson	North end of MS 28 overlap; northern terminus; western terminus of MS 28
1.000 mi = 1.609 km; 1.000 km = 0.621 mi: Concurrency terminus
