= Donna Ladd =

American investigative journalist (born 1961)

Donna Ladd (born October 9, 1961) is an American investigative journalist who co-founded the Jackson Free Press, a community magazine, and later, the Mississippi Free Press, an online news publication that emphasizes solutions journalism where Ladd currently serves as editor. She is noted for highlighting the historical and continuing role of race in current events, for investigative reporting that helped convict klansman James Ford Seale for his role in the 1964 civil rights kidnappings and deaths of Henry Hezekiah Dee and Charles Eddie Moore, and for her coverage of Frank Melton, the controversial mayor of Jackson, Mississippi.

== Early life and education ==
Ladd was born in Philadelphia, Mississippi on October 9, 1961. Her father was an alcoholic who flunked out of elementary school while her mother was illiterate.

In 1983, Ladd completed her bachelor of arts in political science at Mississippi State University and moved to Colorado to pursue a career in journalism. She helped start The Colorado Springs Independent, Colorado Springs' first alternative newspaper. Then in 1999, she moved to New York City where she wrote for The Village Voice and pursued a master's degree in journalism from Columbia University, which she earned in 2001.

== Career in Mississippi ==
After she finished schooling, Ladd returned to Mississippi and co-founded the Jackson Free Press in 2002 with her partner Todd Stauffer. She served as editor-in-chief until 2021, when she began to devote more attention to the Mississippi Free Press, a nonprofit newsroom she co-founded in 2020. The Mississippi Free Press acquired the Jackson Free Press in 2022, of which Ladd is the editor-in-chief.

=== James Ford Seale reporting ===
In July 2005, Donna Ladd, along with photographer Kate Medley, accompanied Thomas Moore and filmmaker David Ridgen to Moore's hometown of Meadville, Mississippi, to investigate the 1964 Ku Klux Klan murders of Moore's brother, Charles Moore, and his friend Henry Dee. Ladd's reporting in the Jackson Free Press revealed that the lead suspect, James Ford Seale, was still alive and residing in the area, contrary to prior reports by other media outlets claiming he was deceased. Her work helped renew national attention on the case, leading to Seale's indictment by the U.S. Department of Justice in January 2007. He was convicted later that year and sentenced to life in prison. Ladd's coverage received national and international recognition, including from NPR, CNN, BBC, and the Poynter Institute.

== Diversity work ==
Ladd was formerly the national Diversity Chair for the Association of Alternative Newsweeklies. She taught annual writing workshops at the Academy for Alternative Journalism at Northwestern University every summer, a program to increase diversity in the alternative press.

Her work for racial conciliation and justice in the state have been recognized widely, including in a Glamour magazine profile, as well as by other media outlets.

Ladd has served previously on the board of directors of the Association of Alternative Newsweeklies and as its national Diversity Chair. She is also vice president of the ACLU of Mississippi.

== Awards ==
- In 2006, Ladd and Mississippi NAACP chapter president Derrick Johnson were co-recipients of the Friendship Award, an annual prize given by Jackson 2000, a racial reconciliation group.
- Ladd has received six awards from the Association of Alternative Newsweeklies for her investigative work and political commentary, including for her Dee-Moore series and as part of the team that investigated Mayor Frank Melton.
- 2005, Ladd was designated one of Mississippi's leading 50 businesswomen by the Mississippi Business Journal
- In 2024, Ladd was named one of the Top CEOs in Mississippi by the Mississippi Business Journal
