= CBC News: Sunday =

Canadian television newsmagazine series

CBC News: Sunday is a weekly television newsmagazine series in Canada that aired on Sunday mornings on both CBC Newsworld and CBC Television. Hosted by Evan Solomon and Carole MacNeil, the program first went on the air in February 2002, offering exclusive and headline news, behind-the-scenes reports, in-depth interviews with world leaders and newsmakers.

Running for two hours, the program's format typically led with a feature interview with a major newsmaker, followed by a "cover story" piece on a public affairs issue, an op-ed commentary by a variety of figures, a panel discussion of journalists analyzing good and bad media coverage of various stories, and a feature on ethics and spirituality.

The show has won more than 40 national and international awards and nominations: "Deadline Iraq: Uncensored Stories of the War," a documentary about what the public does not see from the front in Iraq, won the Red Cross Prize at the Monte Carlo TV Festival; "Beyond Words: Photographers of War" won Best Short Feature, National at the 2005 Gabriel Awards, as well as a Bronze Medal at the 2005 Columbus International Film & Video Festival, and a 2005 Gemini Award Nomination for Best Magazine Segment, while Evan Solomon won the 2005 Gemini for Best Host Interviewer.

In 2007, the feature documentary Mississippi Cold Case by David Ridgen, that started its life on CBC News: Sunday, made news in America and won over a dozen major awards after playing a lead role in the indictment, trial, and conviction of James Ford Seale, a Mississippi Ku Klux Klansman who assisted in the kidnapping and murder of Henry Hezekiah Dee and Charles Eddie Moore, two African-American 19-year-olds in 1964 Mississippi. The film went on to open INPUT 2008 in Johannesburg, South Africa.

CBC News: Sunday's sister evening prime-time program CBC News: Sunday Night, also hosted by Solomon and MacNeil, would sometimes repeat selected features from the daytime program, but was principally a traditional CBC newscast focused on reportage of current news.

After eight seasons on air, on May 31, 2009, CBC News: Sunday aired its final episode in front of a live audience in the CBC Atrium.
