= Civil Rights and Restorative Justice Project =

Initiative by the Northeastern University School of Law

The Civil Rights Restorative Justice Project is an initiative by the Northeastern University School of Law in Boston, Massachusetts, to document every racially motivated killing in the American South between 1930 and 1970. The project aims to serve as a resource for scholars, policymakers, and organizers involved in various initiatives seeking justice for crimes of the civil rights era. CRRJ focuses on research, particularly concerning cold cases, and supports policy initiatives on anti-civil rights violence, such as various remediation efforts including criminal and civil prosecutions, truth and reconciliation proceedings, and legislative remedies.

== Sample cases ==
In 2008 the Project represented Thomas Moore and Thelma Collins, family of Charles Eddie Moore and Henry Hezekiah Dee, in their civil suit against Franklin County, Mississippi. They charged that its law enforcement had been complicit in the Ku Klux Klan kidnappings and murders of their relatives on May 2, 1964. In prosecution of what was known as the 2007 Mississippi Cold Case, James Ford Seale was convicted in federal court for these deaths. The county settled with Moore and Collins in June 2010 for an undisclosed amount.

In December 2014, the Project successfully helped to vacate the conviction of George Stinney of Alcolu, South Carolina, who at age 14 was the youngest person in United States history to have been executed. He had been convicted of murdering two white girls by an all-white jury in a brief trial. He was deprived of defense counsel and not allowed to see his parents until after the trial. Because of numerous constitutional abuses during his prosecution and trial, the court vacated his conviction.

In 2016 CRRJP's Tara Dunn and Ariel Goeun Lee reported on the full account of their investigation into the notorious 1947 death of Henry "Peg" Gilbert while held in the Harris County, Georgia jail. This took place in the county seat of Hamilton, on May 23, 1947. Gilbert was a prosperous, 42-year-old, married African-American farmer and father of four. He was arrested without a warrant, on wrongful charges of harboring a black fugitive who had shot a white man in Troup County. (Harris County had no jurisdiction there.) Hamilton Police Chief William H. Buchanan had claimed he shot Gilbert in self-defense. But, "When morticians examined the dead man, they found that bones all over Gilbert’s body had been crushed. His skull was shattered, one of his legs was broken, and he suffered five gunshot wounds." After her husband's funeral, Mae Henry Gilbert was prosecuted on the same charges in Harris County but was successfully defended by her counsel, white attorney Daniel Duke, who got the charges dropped.

== See also ==
- Civil Rights Movement
