= Jackson Free Press =

American community magazine in Mississippi

- Type: Magazine
- Format: Tabloid
- Owner(s): Donna Ladd; Todd Stauffer
- Publisher: Todd Stauffer
- Editor: Donna Ladd; Nate Schumann
- Founded: 2002
- Headquarters: Jackson, Mississippi
- Circulation: 15,000
- Readership: 37,500 (print); 30,000 (web)
- Website: jacksonfreepress.com

The Jackson Free Press (JFP) is an alternative weekly magazine available free of charge in Jackson, Mississippi and surrounding suburbs. It was founded in 2002 by Mississippi native Donna Ladd and author and technology expert Todd Stauffer and launched both online and in print that same year. In 2022, the magazine's assets were purchased by the Mississippi Journalism and Education Group, which owns and operates the Mississippi Free Press.

== History ==
The Jackson Free Press was founded in 2002 by Mississippi native Donna Ladd and author and technology expert Todd Stauffer and launched simultaneously online and as a free biweekly magazine. The magazine became weekly in May 2004. The publication's name is based on the original Mississippi Free Press, a civil rights movement newspaper started by a multiracial coalition.

In 2006, Gannett Corp. and their newspaper The Clarion-Ledger proposed a new distribution plan for merchants that would require independent publishers to pay a fee and sign an exclusive distribution contract to join. The Jackson Free Press joined with eight other publishers in the Jackson area to form the Mississippi Independent Publishers Alliance (MIPA) to fight the effort and create their own distribution plan. The fight between MIPA and Gannett Corp. was covered in the Editor & Publisher trade magazine, as well as media across the country. Gannett's plan was investigated by Mississippi Attorney General Jim Hood. In 2009, Gannett closed their distribution network while MIPA maintained theirs.

In January 2021, Donna Ladd, then the 18-year editor-in-chief of the magazine, transferred to a new role as founding editor while Nate Schumann was promoted to managing editor.

In 2022, the magazine's journalism assets were sold to the Mississippi Journalism and Education Group, a nonprofit media organization that owns and operates the Mississippi Free Press, a nonprofit online newsroom founded by Jackson Free Press co-founder Donna Ladd and former Jackson Free Press Associate Publisher Kimberly Griffin.

== Content ==
The magazine provides daily news of Jackson, Mississippi and nearby suburbs as well as online entertainment coverage. The magazine is supported by advertisement revenue.

=== Notable coverage ===
In July 2005, the Jackson Free Press, led by editor Donna Ladd, reported that James Ford Seale, the long-suspected Klansman involved in the 1964 abductions and murders of Charles Moore and Henry Dee, was still alive and living in Mississippi, contradicting previous media reports. This revelation helped prompt a renewed federal investigation and led to Seale’s indictment in 2007.

== Circulation ==
The Jackson Free Press is bi-weekly by Jackson Free Press, Inc. and is distributed in Hinds, Rankin, Madison, and Warren counties. In 2007, the magazine had a circulation of 17,000 and between 52,000 and 64,332 readers per week. In 2016, the magazine had a circulation of 15,000, and an audit by the Circulation Verification Council found the magazine had around 37,500 weekly print readers and 30,000 weekly visitors online. A 2016 survey found the magazine's readership had an average age of 43.7 and that 53% were female. Around 93% of its readership have attended college and a majority make more than $50,000 a year.

== Awards ==
The magazine has won multiple Green Eyeshade and Diamond awards from the Society of Professional Journalists. It has received several awards from the Associated Press for the Louisiana/Mississippi region. It has won multiple awards from the Association of Alternative Newsweeklies.

== See also ==
- List of alternative weekly newspapers
