= Murder of Frank Morris =

1964 murder in Louisiana, United States

Frank Morris (30 October 1914 – 14 December 1964) was an American businessman who died as a result of arson to his shoe shop in Ferriday, Louisiana, a city with a history of racial violence. There have been allegations of witness intimidation, evidence tampering, and involvement by local law enforcement. No charges have been brought despite three FBI investigations.

== Life ==
Frank Morris's mother, Charlotte, died shortly after his birth. His father, Sullivan, operated a shoe shop in Natchez, Mississippi. Frank Morris fathered one child, and had two grandchildren.

Morris opened Frank's Shoes Service in the late 1930s, in his hometown of Ferriday, Louisiana. This business serviced both black and white customers. His daily tasks included repairing shoes and saddles, selling jewellery, hats, and clothing, and dyeing purses. The shop was very successful and was known by the tag line, "Open every day and half the night", in its ads in the Concordia Sentinel. The shop was also his residence. The building was burned down in the early morning of December 10, 1964.

== Arson ==
On December 10, 1964, two unidentified white men set fire to the shoe repair shop owned by Frank Morris. At approximately 1:00 a.m., Morris was awakened in a back room of the shop by the sound of glass breaking. Morris opened the front door of the shop, where he was met by two men in their thirties, one of whom was armed with a shotgun. The men broke multiple shop windows and proceeded to "spread a flammable liquid around the outside of the shop, and evidence indicates that the subjects may have spread the flammable liquid inside of the shop". After one of the subjects lit a match, the shop caught fire; Morris was still present in the building. He was able to escape the shop but sustained burns on 100% of his body. Morris was taken to the hospital by two Ferriday police officers and was able to speak to FBI investigators. In three interviews conducted by FBI investigators, Morris stated that "he saw a man pouring gasoline around the place [...] another man had a shotgun and told him 'to get back in there, nigger'". Morris entered a coma two days later, and died on December 14.

== Pattern of lynchings ==
Ferriday is located in Concordia Parish, Louisiana, across the Mississippi River from Adams County, Mississippi. During the 1960s, the area was a strictly segregated society. The population of Adams County was split roughly in half between blacks and whites. Much like the other Mississippi counties, law enforcement and the courts were run by whites. The state of Mississippi in the Jim Crow era was infamous for racially-fueled lynchings. Concordia Parish had 14 recorded racially-motivated murders between 1964 and 1967.

Ku Klux Klan (KKK) activity was exceptionally high during the Civil Rights era. The Silver Dollar Group (SDG) was a violent and exceptionally militant Klan offshoot that operated in Adams County between 1964 and 1967. The SDG regularly committed arson, bombings, and murder. The Federal Bureau of Investigation (FBI) considered the SDG to be a highly-dangerous domestic terror cell, and conducted multiple investigations into its activities. Multiple disappearances and murders in the Natchez, Mississippi, area were connected to both the KKK and the SDG.

== FBI investigations ==
=== First investigation (1965) ===
A preliminary FBI investigation began immediately after the arson; its goal was to "determine if any federal laws had been violated, specifically whether Morris had been involved in voter registration or other civil rights activities and whether any subjects had connections to any racist organizations." The FBI collected evidence at the crime scene and conducted interviews with local law enforcement, local Klan leaders, and witnesses. Morris was interviewed three times; however, he was heavily medicated. Morris told the FBI that the men were from Natchez, Mississippi, were between the ages of 30 and 35, and that "one [man] was young with gray hair and the other was very white". The FBI investigators believed that Morris knew his attackers, but was unwilling to divulge their identities. The preliminary investigation concluded that Morris had not been involved in any racially motivated activities.

The first full investigation of the Frank Morris murder began in January 1965, at the request of then-Assistant Attorney General of the Civil Rights Division, Burke Marshall. The FBI had received information that local law enforcement officials had been involved. The FBI later concluded that the local Klan was likely to be involved, but conflicting accounts, no viable subjects, and lack of a motive led to the investigation being closed in May 1965.

=== Second investigation (1967) ===
On February 27, 1967, Wharlest Jackson, an employee at Armstrong Tire & Rubber Company in Natchez, Mississippi, was killed when a bomb exploded under the hood of his car while he was driving home. Jackson had recently been promoted to a position never before held by an African American. He was targeted by the SDG. The FBI opened a full investigation into his murder due to its civil rights implications, as Jackson was treasurer of the local chapter of the NAACP. Much like the Morris case, witness accounts were not corroborating, and in August 1968, the investigation was closed.

Following the bombing, the FBI launched operation "WHARBOM" and placed multiple informants within Klan groups surrounding Natchez. One such informant, known as Orvin C. "Coonie" Poissot, was a Klansman from Texas who had a relationship with a local sheriff's deputy named Frank Delaughter, whom Poissot implicated as a conspirator in the murder of Frank Morris. However, Poisott was eliminated as a potential witness due to his erratic amphetamine use and difficulties differentiating between personal knowledge and hearsay.

On August 3, 1967, a confidential informant, who was a high-ranking officer of the KKK, told the FBI that a few days prior to the Morris arson, E. D. Morace approached the informant regarding an African American, referred to as "Old Frank", whom Morace said "had been flirtatious with white women". Morace requested that Klan members from Mississippi "give him a beating". Later that week, Morace called the informant saying that, "The rabbit hunt is off — forget about it". The following day Morris's shop was attacked. A few days after the arson, the informant was approached by Morace who stated that if "he, Jones, Torgersen, and Scarborough were arrested, the source should get them out of jail". The informant, fearing for his life, did not share this information with the FBI until two years after the arson. Two WHARBOM informants also reported information regarding the murder of Morris, and the FBI reopened the Morris investigation in August 1967.

By the fall of 1967, E. D. Morace, Tommie Lee Jones, Thor Lee Torgersen, and James Lee Scarborough were the primary suspects in the murder of Frank Morris. All four men were questioned and denied any involvement in the arson and murder. When Jones was interviewed on September 22, he stated that "if he was arrested for this crime, officers also would have to arrest DeLaughter". This was of interest to the FBI, as multiple informants stated that the Concordia Parish Sheriff's Department had prior knowledge of the coming attack on Morris, and was told to "be on the other side of the parish". Scarborough, while under investigation for both Jackson's and Morris's murders, denied any involvement, stating that "every time something happens to a Negro it is immediately blamed on white people."

On November 19–20, 1967, two confidential sources described the same November meeting in which Morace, Jones, Torgersen, and Scarborough implicated themselves in the murder of Morris. They also stated that Morace described a battery-powered device which could "spray five gallons of gasoline in five minutes". According to these informants, Morace was the primary conspirator in the murder of Morris; however, the FBI could not find any physical evidence corroborating their witnesses. In February 1968, the second investigation was closed when the FBI determined that there was insufficient evidence to charge any of the suspects.

=== Third investigation (2007) ===
The FBI reopened the Frank Morris investigation in 2007, as part of the Civil Rights Era Cold Case Initiative. During this investigation, the FBI re-interviewed the living witnesses who had first-hand information about the arson, as well as "family members, business owners and neighbors in the vicinity of the shoe shop, law enforcement officers, community members, and former KKK members". In 2008, the FBI, through local media, informed the public that they were offering a $10,000 reward for information leading to an arrest in the Morris case. Three new subjects were identified, but the investigators did not uncover any credible physical evidence supporting the allegations. The investigation revealed new allegations that local police officers were tampering with the investigation by threatening witnesses. Ferriday policemen, including "DeLaughter, Bill Ogden, and Ferriday Police Chief Bob Warren", had ordered an unidentified witness to "keep his mouth shut", and later told him to "get out of town". This witness also received death threats, and his home was fired upon on multiple occasions. The FBI concluded the investigation in 2016 when investigators determined there was insufficient evidence to charge any individual with any federal crimes; furthermore, important witnesses, suspects, and informants were dead.

== Research by Stanley Nelson ==
Stanley Nelson, an award-winning journalist and Pulitzer Prize finalist, published Devils Walking: Klan Murders along the Mississippi in the 1960s, after a series of articles in the Concordia Sentinel. Nelson interviewed witnesses to uncover unknown facts and haunting recollections about the racially motivated murders around Ferriday. Morris, in particular, is featured in this text. Nelson investigated rumors that police officers possibly committed the arson; according to Della Mae Smith, "Deputy Frank DeLaughter had organized the arson" and local police had set the home ablaze. Delaughter lied about his location during the arson, claiming that he was out of the jurisdiction on a non-emergency call. An identified suspect had also fired a shotgun into the home of Junious "Tee-Wee" Kelly after Kelly had witnessed the arson. Later that week, officers Frank DeLaughter and Bill Ogden intimidated Kelly and forced him out of town. Kelly later told Rosa Williams, Morris's granddaughter, "I know what happened to your grandfather... You don't have to look no further than the police department."

Ferriday locals thought highly of Morris, who was a community-centric man who gave many young black men their first paying job; Morris also hosted a radio gospel program. At the time of his death, Morris owned the land his shop was on, and he was seen as an honest man who paid his bills on time. Although people generally thought highly of Morris, black residents thought Morris was too shocking to white residents. He had previously dedicated songs to white women on his radio show and would lean into their cars and occasionally sit in their passenger seats. A local black teacher claimed that after the arson, a rumor was spreading that Morris was facilitating interracial liaisons. There were rumors of Morris being romantically involved with the wife of a white man, and after the arson, the white couple soon left town. Ferriday Police officer William Howell Harp Jr. alleged that Morris was a bootlegger and sold narcotics. Harp and colleagues also found a "slightly scorched" suitcase filled with fourteen and a half pints of bourbon. The newspapers the bourbon was wrapped in had no signs of burning, indicating tampering with the scene. Harp described Morris as an alcoholic and had two confrontations with him during 1963–1965, as well as a small argument outside of the courthouse. Harp's new information regarding Morris shed doubt on the story concerning DeLaughter. The City of Ferriday hit a dead end with the case, and the sheriff's Department expressed no interest in taking it over.

== See also ==
- List of unsolved murders (1900–1979)
