= Mississippi Free Press =

Mississippi nonprofit newsroom

- Website type: Nonprofit online newsroom
- Available in: English
- Headquarters: Jackson, Mississippi
- Owners: Mississippi Journalism and Education Group
- Founders: Kimberly Griffin, Donna Ladd
- Editor: Donna Ladd
- CEO: Donna Ladd
- Website: www.mississippifreepress.org
- Launched: March 2020; 6 years ago

The Mississippi Free Press is a nonprofit online newsroom headquartered in Jackson, Mississippi. Founded in March 2020 by Kimberly Griffin and Donna Ladd, the newsroom engages in statewide public interest reporting and solutions journalism. In May 2022, its parent organization, the Mississippi Journalism and Education Group, purchased the assets of the Jackson Free Press.

== History ==
The Mississippi Free Press was founded in March 2020 by Kimberly Griffin and Donna Ladd, who met working at the Jackson Free Press, of which Ladd is a cofounder. The pair recruited the JFP editor Ashton Pittman. While Griffin and Ladd did not plan to launch in 2020, the COVID-19 pandemic and its impact on Mississippi encouraged them to launch. The newsroom has steadily grown in size since its launch.

In May 2022, the Mississippi Journalism and Education Group, the newsroom's parent organization, acquired the assets of the Jackson Free Press, including its physical offices, archives, and name.

== Content ==
The Mississippi Free Press covers a variety of topics centered around systemic inequalities, such as race, education, voting rights, water access, and politics. It aims to examine the historic causes and systemic issues facing Mississippians as well as partake in solutions journalism for these issues.

== Organization ==
The Mississippi Free Press is a nonprofit journalism organization and a member of the Institute for Nonprofit News and the Association of Alternative Newsmedia. The newsroom has received grants and funding from the American Press Institute, Black Voters Matter Fund, Democracy Fund, Walton Family Foundation, InAsMuch Foundation, Knight Foundation, MacArthur Foundation, Mississippi Humanities Council, Andrew W. Mellon Foundation, ProPublica, Report for America, Solutions Journalism Network, Hewlett Foundation, W. K. Kellogg Foundation, and other organizations. It has also received funding from Facebook, Microsoft, and Google with their respective journalism programs.

The newsroom is headquartered in Jackson, Mississippi. The Poynter Institute considered its staff one of the most diverse news organizations in the state and awarded the organization for its diversity.

== Awards ==
The newsroom has received a number of awards for its reporting. It has received several Green Eyeshade and Diamond awards from the Society of Professional Journalists. It is the winner of several awards from the Institute for Nonprofit News. It was the recipient of the 2023 Izzy Award. The newsroom received an award from Report for America. The Association of Alternative Newsmedia awarded the newsroom for several stories.

Ashton Pittman and Donna Ladd were finalists for the Ancil Payne Award for Ethics in Journalism in 2021. The Mississippi Business Journal has awarded Donna Ladd and Kimberly Griffin several awards for their business acumen.

== Affiliations ==
- Institute for Nonprofit News
