= James Ford Seale =

American Ku Klux Klan member and convict

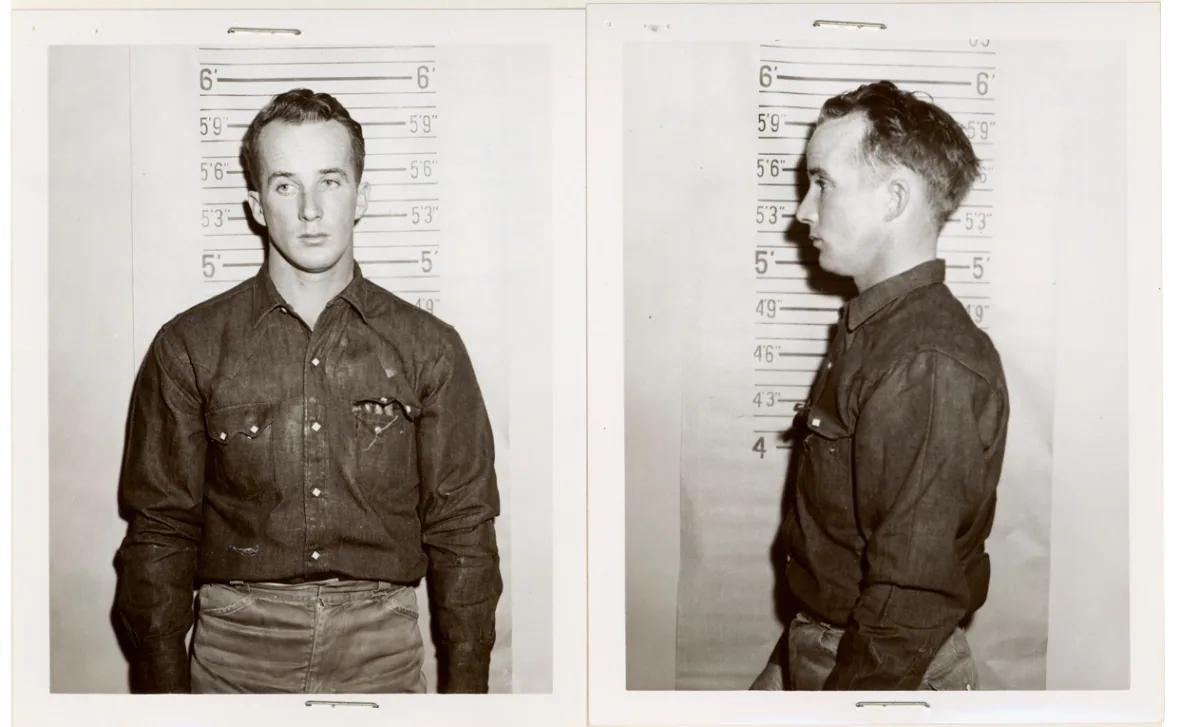
- Seale in 1964
- Born: June 25, 1935; Franklin County, Mississippi, U.S.
- Died: August 2, 2011 (aged 76); FCI Terre Haute, Terre Haute, Indiana, U.S.
- Occupation: Lumber worker
- Status: Deceased
- Allegiance: Ku Klux Klan
- Motive: White supremacy
- Convictions: Kidnapping (2 counts); Conspiracy to commit kidnapping
- Penalty: Life imprisonment

Details
- Victims: Henry Hezekiah Dee, 19; Charles Eddie Moore, 19
- Date: May 2, 1964
- Country: United States
- State: Mississippi

James Ford Seale (June 25, 1935 – August 2, 2011) was a Ku Klux Klan member charged by the U.S. Justice Department on January 24, 2007, and subsequently convicted on June 14, 2007, for the May 1964 kidnapping and murder of Henry Hezekiah Dee and Charles Eddie Moore, two African-American young men in Meadville, Mississippi. At the time of his arrest, Seale worked at a lumber plant in Roxie, Mississippi. He also worked as a crop duster and was a police officer in Louisiana briefly in the 1970s. He was a member of the militant Klan organization known as the Silver Dollar Group, whose members were identified with a silver dollar; occasionally minted the year of the member's birth.

Seale was convicted on June 14, 2007, by a federal jury on one count of conspiracy to kidnap two persons, and two counts of kidnapping. He was sentenced on August 24, 2007, to three life terms for his part in the 1964 murders of the two Mississippi teens. In 2008, Seale's kidnapping conviction was overturned by a panel of the United States Court of Appeals for the Fifth Circuit, before being reinstated by that court sitting en banc the following year. He was incarcerated at the Federal Correctional Institution (FCI) in Terre Haute, Indiana, where he died in 2011.

== Background ==
Southern Mississippi was an active area of the civil rights movement in the 1960s. Many working class whites feared greater job competition from blacks if integration changed the society and tensions were high over desegregation of schools. The Natchez area became a center of Ku Klux Klan and other segregationist activity, with violence directed against black churches, often used as the center of community organizing, and black activists. Seale's brother Jack and his father Clyde were also members of the Silver Dollar Group.

== Double murder in 1964 ==
James Ford Seale abducted the two young African-American men, Henry Hezekiah Dee and Charles Eddie Moore, each 19, as they were hitchhiking near Roxie on May 2, 1964. Moore had been a student at Alcorn State College. According to F.B.I. records, Seale thought the two might be civil rights activists, especially as Dee had just returned from Chicago. He ordered them into his car by telling them he was a federal revenue agent, investigating moonshine stills.

He drove them into the Homochitto National Forest between Meadville and Natchez, having called Charles Marcus Edwards to have him and other Klansmen follow. As Seale held a sawed-off shotgun on the pair, the other men tied the young men to a tree and severely beat them with long, skinny sticks (called "bean sticks" because they're often used to "stalk" beans in gardens). According to the January 2007 indictment, the Klansmen took the pair, who were reportedly still alive, to a nearby farm where Seale duct-taped their mouths and hands. The Klansmen wrapped the bloody pair in a plastic tarp, put them into the trunk of another Klansman's red Ford (the deceased Ernest Parker, according to FBI records), and drove almost 100 miles to the Ole River near Tallulah, Louisiana. They had to drive through Louisiana to get there, but the backwater is located in Warren County, Mississippi.

At the river, the Klansmen took the pair away from shore in a boat, where they tied them to an old Jeep engine block and sections of railroad track rails with chains before dumping them in the water to drown. Reportedly still alive when put in the river, the young men were killed in Mississippi. According to a Klan informant, Seale said later that he would have shot them first, but didn't want to get blood all over the boat. Edwards himself testified in 2007 that the two boys were stuffed alive into the back of Seale's car before being taken to the farm where they were beaten. Edwards, who was granted immunity for his testimony after being indicted for aiming a shotgun at the two black men while fellow Ku Klux Klan members beat them, also testified that Seale had in fact attached heavy weights to the boys and then dumped them alive into the river.

The bodies of the pair were found about two months later by US Navy divers who were working on the investigation associated with the disappearance in June of three civil rights workers: Michael Schwerner and Andrew Goodman; both from New York City and James Chaney from Meridian, Mississippi. The FBI made an investigation of the Dee-Moore murders (they had more than 100 agents around Natchez, trying to reduce violence), and presented their findings to local District Attorney Lenox Forman. FBI agents and Mississippi Highway Patrol officers arrested Seale, then 29, and fellow Klansman Charles Marcus Edwards, 31, on November 6, 1964. According to FBI informants, both men confessed to the crime. They were released on November 11, after family members posted $5,000 bond each.

On January 11, 1965, the District Attorney Lenox Forman filed a "motion to dismiss affidavits" with Justice of the Peace Willie Bedford, who signed the motion the same day. The motions state: "… that in the interest of justice and in order to fully develop the facts in this case, the affidavits against James Seale and Charles Edwards should be dismissed by this Court without prejudice to the Defendants or to the State of Mississippi at this time in order that the investigation may be continued and completed for presentation to a Grand Jury at some later date." Forman said he dismissed the case because it had been prejudiced toward the defendants, who "put out the story" in Meadville that, after their arrest, they had been "brutally mistreated," as reported in 2005 in an investigation by Donna Ladd of the Jackson Free Press.

== 1966 Congressional hearing ==
On January 14, 1966, Seale was called to appear in Washington before a subcommittee of the House Committee on Un-American Activities, which was investigating Klan activities. Seale was there with nine other alleged Klansmen from the violent White Knights of the Ku Klux Klan, including his father, Clyde Seale, and Charles Marcus Edwards, his alleged accomplice in the Dee-Moore murders. The Klansmen repeatedly pleaded the Fifth Amendment, while the chief investigator Donald T. Appell and House members placed into the record what they believed the men had done, including kidnapping and murdering Dee and Moore in 1964. According to the hearing transcript, Appell introduced testimony of Alton Alford, a Meadville man, who said that Seale beat him with his shotgun. Appell asked Seale if he was involved in the 1965 murder of a disillusioned Klansman named Earl Hodges, who had fallen out with Seale's father and was killed by the Klan to prevent him from telling the authorities about their activities. Appell accused Seale and Edwards of claiming "false arrest" by Mississippi highway patrolmen to help them escape criminal charges.

Two authors published books on the case: Don Whitehead wrote Attack on Terror: The FBI Against the Ku Klux Klan in Mississippi, (1990), which included some of the FBI's 1960s-era findings on the Dee-Moore murders. Earl Ofari Hutchinson, in Betrayed: The Presidential Failure to Protect Black Lives, (1996), also wrote about the Dee-Moore case, naming Seale and another suspect as responsible. He called for federal officials to indict the men on kidnapping charges. Hutchinson pointed out that because the crime occurred in a national forest, the federal government has jurisdiction.

== Possible involvement in the assassination of Wharlest Jackson ==
Seale, a member of the Silver Dollar Group, was one of the suspects in the car bombing assassination of civil rights activist Wharlest Jackson in Natchez, Mississippi that took place in 1967. Jackson was a member of the NAACP chapter in Natchez. The Silver Dollar Group was a militant Klan organization founded by Raleigh Jackson "Red" Glover. Glover was the main suspect in the Wharlest Jackson case. The Silver Dollar group is also suspected of a failed attempt to assassinate Natchez NAACP chapter president George Metcalfe by car bombing.

== Death of Bailey Odell ==
In June 1966, Seale ran over Bailey Odell, a 74-year-old black man who had recently registered to vote. At the time, Odell's death was ruled to have been an accident. However, this has since been questioned.

== 1970 plane crash ==
In 1970, Seale "was the lone survivor and only eyewitness to the deadliest air disaster in Concordia Parish's history in which five people died on a foggy morning." Among the death was Dr. Charles Colvin, who had been the attending physician for Frank Morris, one of the victims of the Silver Dollar Group.

== 1973 plane crash ==
Seale narrowly survived another plane crash in 1973.

== Reopening of the case in 2005 ==
In 1998 Thomas Moore, the older brother of Charles and a retired 30-year Army veteran, began to work on the case. Then living in Colorado, he wrote to District Attorney Ronnie Harper "asking him to look into his brother's murder.” He agreed. Various media journalists began to look at the story again, including Newsday, 20-20 and investigative reporter Jerry Mitchell of The Clarion-Ledger (Jackson, Mississippi). On January 14, 2000, Mitchell reported that the murders occurred on federal land. This spurred the FBI to take another look, as the location gave them jurisdiction, but some of their resources got diverted to the revival of the investigation of Edgar Ray Killen in the 1964 Neshoba County murders.

Moore was contacted by the filmmaker David Ridgen of the Canadian Broadcasting Corporation. Together they went to Mississippi on July 7, 2005, to begin shooting the documentary Mississippi Cold Case, about the events of Moore's brother's murder. Together they began a search for justice in the case. They had also arranged to work with journalist Donna Ladd and photographer Kate Medley from the Jackson Free Press, an alternative newsweekly in Jackson, Mississippi.

On July 8 the two men interviewed the District Attorney Ronnie Harper, who told them that James Ford Seale was alive. Seale's family members had reported him dead to the media a few years before. The pair confirmed this fact when Kenny Byrd, a resident of Roxie, pointed them toward Seale's trailer. The same morning, Moore and Ridgen met with Ladd and Medley. During this trip, the former Klansman James Kenneth Greer told Ladd and Medley that Seale was living in Roxie, Mississippi next to his brother.

The discovery of Seale helped to revive interest in the case; Moore and Ridgen visited the U.S. Attorney Dunn Lampton, who pledged to re-open the case. Two weeks after the trip, Ladd published the first of several articles in the Jackson Free Press about the investigation and the discovery that Seale was alive. Moved by the response of people he talked to about the case, in July Thomas Moore formed the "Dee Moore Coalition for Justice in Franklin County."

Moore and Ridgen returned to Mississippi every few months to continue filming, making nine trips in total. Each time they visited Dunn Lampton, where Moore presented more of the data they had found. The Jackson Free Press continued its investigation as well, and has published a package of all of its stories on the case to keep local interest high. At the end of July 2005, the paper published Thomas Moore's response to an editorial that appeared in the Franklin Advocate, the weekly in Meadville, in which the editor said the case should not be re-opened. (Editor Mary Lou Webb of the Advocate did not publish Moore's response.)

== Indictment, trial and conviction in 2007 ==
The indictment affidavit filed January 24, 2007, in U.S. District Court in Jackson, charged Seale with two counts of kidnapping and one count of conspiracy. The "introductory allegations" begin:

The White Knights of the Ku Klux Klan (WKKKK) operated in the Southern District of Mississippi and elsewhere, and was a secret organization of adult white males who, among other things, targeted for violence African Americans they believed were involved in civil rights activity in order to intimidate and retaliate against such individuals.

The document says that Seale and other Klan members suspected Dee of being involved with civil rights activity. Moore was included in the abduction and murder because he was a friend of Dee.

Seale was arraigned and denied bond because he was considered a flight risk: he owned no property, was a pilot, and lived in a motor home. He and his wife had already left Roxie for a brief time after the reporting team's initial July 2005 visits, according to Roxie residents. Primary testimony was from fellow Klansman Charles Marcus Edwards. After he was confronted by Thomas Moore and David Ridgen during filming of a scene in Mississippi Cold Case, state and federal officials gave him immunity from prosecution to tell the full story of what happened.

Seale was convicted of kidnapping and conspiracy on June 14, 2007, by a federal jury. On August 24, 2007, Seale was sentenced to serve three life terms for his crimes. Judge Wingate said that he took into account Seale's advanced age and poor health, but added, "Then I had to take a look at the crime itself, the horror, the ghastliness of it." Seale was imprisoned for a year at a medical facility.

Seale's conviction was overturned on September 9, 2008, by the 5th US Circuit Court of Appeals. The court ruled that the lower court had failed to recognize the statute of limitations for kidnapping had expired. At the time of the kidnapping, the act was a capital crime under federal law; capital crimes have no statute of limitations. However, in the 1970s Congress and the Supreme Court redefined kidnapping as a non-capital crime, with a statute of limitations. The lower court did not apply the newer statute of limitations, while the appeals court did. The prosecutors asked the appeals court to reconsider the ruling, and the court agreed to do so en banc.

On June 5, 2009, the en banc panel of 5th Circuit judges ruled in an evenly divided decision on the matter, thus upholding the district court's decision. Seale's three convictions and sentences were re-instated. On motion of defense counsel, the 5th Circuit asked the US Supreme Court to review the case. On November 2, 2009, the Supreme Court declined to hear the case, letting the lower rulings stand.

== Death ==
Seale died in prison on August 2, 2011. He had been serving his sentence at FCI Terre Haute.

== Representation in other media ==
- The documentary Mississippi Cold Case (2007) was produced by the Canadian Broadcasting Company, and was David Ridgen's first introduction to the Dee-Moore case.
- The six part podcast Someone Knows Something was produced by the Canadian Broadcasting Company, and features Thomas Moore and David Ridgen attempting to find justice for Moore's brother, Charles Moore, in the modern day.
