= MBJ =

MBJ may refer to:

- Sangster International Airport (IATA code MBJ), a major airport in Montego Bay, Jamaica.
- Mississippi Business Journal, American newspaper
- Michael B. Jordan (born 1987), American actor
- Mayurbhanj, a district in Odisha.
