= William Madison Whittington =

American politician (1878–1962)

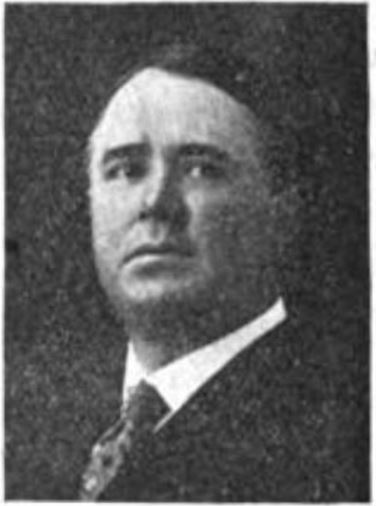
- c. 1917

Member of the U.S. House of Representatives from Mississippi's 3rd district
- In office March 4, 1925 – January 3, 1951
- Preceded by: William Y. Humphreys
- Succeeded by: Frank E. Smith

Member of the Mississippi State Senate from the 27th district
- In office January 1, 1916 – August 16, 1924

Commissioner, Greenwood, Mississippi
- In office January 1, 1907 – January 1, 1911

Personal details
- Born: May 4, 1878 Little Springs, Mississippi, U.S.
- Died: August 20, 1962 (aged 84) Greenwood, Mississippi, U.S.
- Party: Democratic
- Education: University of Mississippi; Mississippi College
- Profession: Attorney

William Madison Whittington (May 4, 1878 – August 20, 1962) was an American politician from Mississippi. Whittington was a U.S. representative to the 69th United States Congress in 1925, and the twelve succeeding Congresses (March 4, 1925 – January 3, 1951) as a Democrat. In Congress, his nickname was "Mr. Flood Control."

== Early life ==
Whittington was born in Little Springs, Mississippi. He was the son of Margaret Isaphene McGehee and Alexander Madison Whittington, a farmer.

He attended the public schools of Franklin County, Mississippi. He attended Mississippi College at Clinton, graduating in 1898. He then studied law at the University of Mississippi, graduating in 1899. While at Mississippi, he was a member of St. Anthony Hall, also known as the Fraternity of Delta Psi.

== Career ==
He was admitted to the bar in 1899. He moved to Roxie, Mississippi on January 1, 1901 where he was principal of a school and also started practicing law. In Roxie, he was also a member of the board of aldermen. In January 1904, he moved to Greenwood, Mississippi, where he continued the practice of law and also started cotton farming. He became a local commissioner for Greenwood from January 1, 1907, to January 1, 1911. In 1914, he started his own private law practice.

He was elected to the Mississippi State Senate from the 27th District from January 1, 1916, to January 1, 1920. He was reelected in 1923 for a four-year term and served from January 1 to August 16, 1924 when he resigned. While with the legislature, he showed his prohibitionist leanings when he authored the state's first Bone Dry Law.

In August 1924 he left the state legislature when he accepted the Democratic nomination for Representative in the United States Congress. Due to Jim Crow laws, Whittington was elected to the House by just 4,000 people, despite living in a district of 435,000.

After the Great Flood of 1927 Whittington authored and successfully forwarded the Flood Control Act of 1928. He served on the Committee of Public Works; the Reclamation Committee, Roads Committee, and Expenditures Committee in the Executive Department; and the Flood Control Committee which is chaired in 1936 and for the next twelve years. Virtually all legislation on flood control between 1928 and 1951 was authored by Whittington.

In 1940 and, again, in 1941, Whittington wanted to run for the United States Senate, but was talked out of it by friends. He retired in 1951 and returned to Greenwood where he practiced law with his son Whittington Jr.

He served as delegate to the Democratic National Conventions in 1920, 1928, 1936, 1940, and 1948. He was a member of the American Bar Association, the Lefore County Bar Association, and the Mississippi State Bar Association.

== Honors ==
- His papers are archived at the University of Mississippi.
- Whittington Hall at Mississippi College was named in his honor.
- He was named Alumni of the Year at Mississippi College.
- Mississippi College gave Whittington an honorary Doctor of Laws degree.
- Whittington Park in Greenwood, Mississippi is named in his honor.

== Personal life ==
Whittington married Lena May McGehee on September 7, 1904. They had no children and she died in September 1907. He married Anna Ward Aven of Clinton, Mississippi on July 20, 1910. She was the first female to graduate from Mississippi College where her father was the president. Their children were Charles Aven Whittington, Mary Whittington, and William Madison Whittington Jr.

He taught Sunday school at the Baptist Church and became president of the Mississippi State Baptist Convention in 1910. He was also a member of the Elks, the Kiwanis Club, the Shriners, and was a 33rd degree Mason. The Whittingtons gave the Avon Fine Arts Building to Mississippi College. In Greenwood, he donated 40 acres for park and built a pavilion there; it was named Whittinton Park.

In his later years, Whittington lost most of his eyesight and could not climb stairs. In 1962, he died at his home in Greenwood at the age of 84. He was buried in Odd Fellows Cemetery.

U.S. House of Representatives
Preceded by William Y. Humphreys	Member of the U.S. House of Representatives from Mississippi's 3rd congressional district 1925-1951	Succeeded by Frank E. Smith
