= Little Springs, Mississippi =

- Unincorporated community
- Location within Mississippi Location within the United States
- Coordinates: 31°24′09″N 90°43′36″W
- Country: United States
- State: Mississippi
- County: Franklin
- Elevation: 440 ft (134 m)
- Time zone: UTC-6 (Central (CST))
  - Summer (DST): UTC-5 (CDT)
- GNIS feature ID: 693784

Little Springs is an unincorporated community in Franklin County, Mississippi, United States.

The Homochitto National Forest is located a short distance west of the community along Little Springs Road.

The community was named for the large number of springs located there.

In 1820, the Mount Zion Baptist Church was established 3 mi (4.8 km) west of Little Springs.

The first school was the Magnolia School, built in 1854. A new school, the Little Springs High School, replaced it in 1901.

A post office was in operation in the early 1900s.

== Notable people ==
- Moze Hunt Jones, member of the Mississippi House of Representatives from 1908 to 1914
- Dan R. McGehee, U.S. Representative from Mississippi.
- William Madison Whittington, U.S. Representative from Mississippi.
