= Moze Hunt Jones =

Mississippi politician

Member of the Mississippi House of Representatives from the Franklin County district
- In office January 1908 – May 21, 1914

Personal details
- Born: February 21, 1883 Little Springs, Mississippi
- Died: May 21, 1914 (aged 31)
- Party: Democrat

Moze Hunt Jones (February 21, 1883 – May 21, 1914) was a Democratic member of the Mississippi House of Representatives, representing Franklin County, from 1908 to his death.

== Biography ==
Moze Hunt Jones was born on February 21, 1883, in Little Springs, Franklin County, Mississippi. He was the son of William Franklin Jones and Iveanore (Hunt) Jones. Jones attended the public schools of Little Springs. He graduated from Mississippi College with a B. S. degree in 1902. He earned his law degree from the University of Mississippi at Oxford in 1903, and practiced law thereafter. Other than being a lawyer, he also was a planter and owned and took care of a plantation. He was elected to the Mississippi House of Representatives, representing Franklin County as a Democrat, in November 1907. He was re-elected in 1911. However, he died on May 21, 1914, before his term ended.
