= Roxie, Mississippi =

- Town
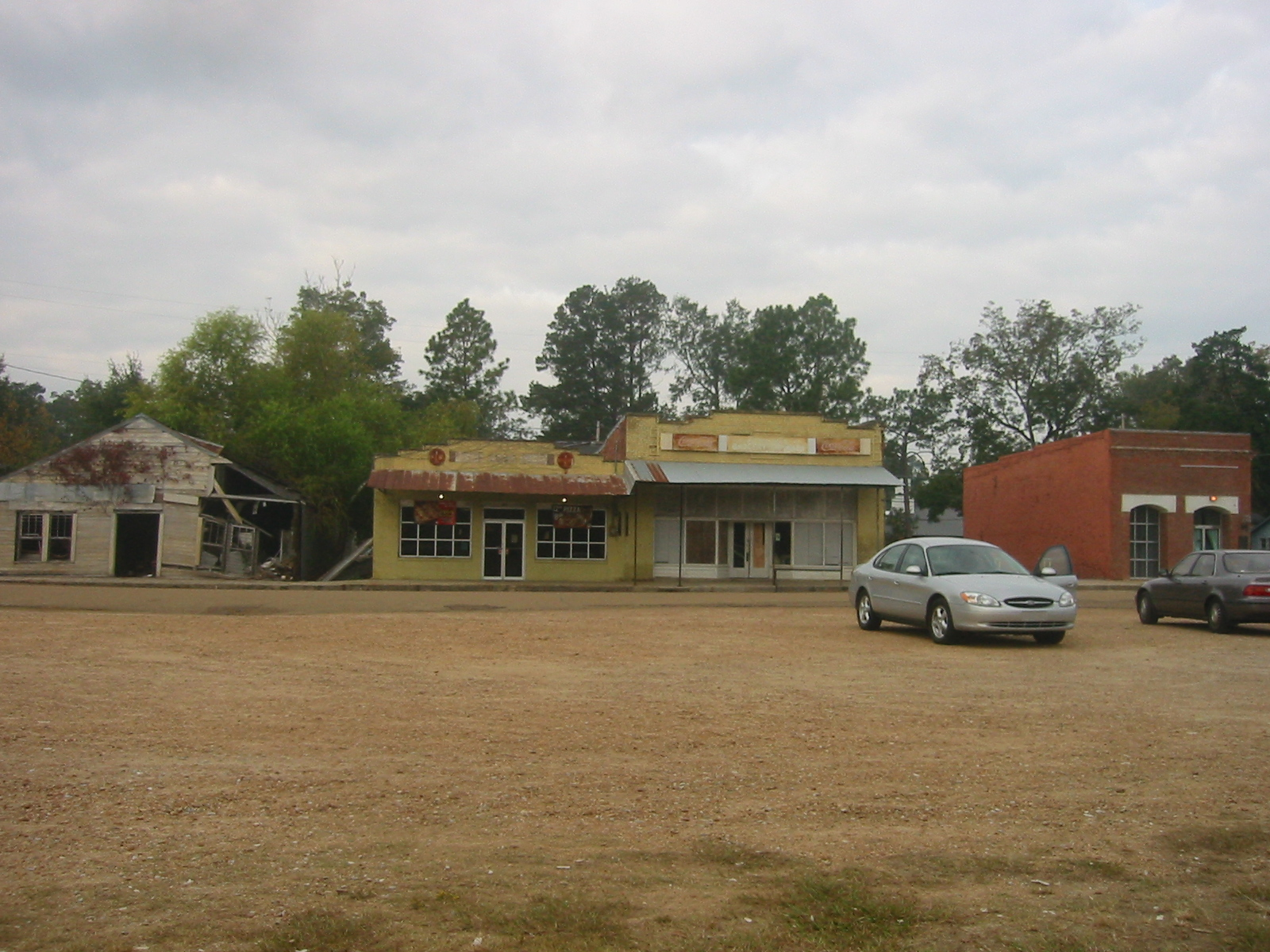
- Roxie in 2005

- Location of Roxie, Mississippi

- Location in the United States
- Coordinates: 31°30′19″N 91°4′2″W
- Country: United States
- State: Mississippi
- County: Franklin

Area
  - Total: 1.76 sq mi (4.55 km^{2})
  - Land: 1.76 sq mi (4.55 km^{2})
  - Water: 0 sq mi (0.00 km^{2})
- Elevation: 240 ft (73 m)

Population (2020)
  - Total: 469
  - Density: 266.9/sq mi (103.04/km^{2})
- Time zone: UTC-6 (Central (CST))
  - Summer (DST): UTC-5 (CDT)
- ZIP code: 39661
- Area code: 601
- FIPS code: 28-64080
- GNIS feature ID: 0694621

Roxie is a town in Franklin County, Mississippi, United States. As of the 2020 census, Roxie had a population of 469. This rural town developed with the construction of railroads in the area. About 2/3 of its population is African American and 1/3 white.

== History ==
Roxie was founded in 1886 on a plot of farmland donated by John Quincy Adams Graves, who was the County Supervisor and a former soldier in the Regimental Band of the 4th Volunteer Mississippi Regiment during the Civil War. The town was named in honor of Graves' newborn daughter.

Roxie was incorporated in 1890.

The town was located at the crossroads of the Louisville, New Orleans and Texas Railway and the Yazoo and Mississippi Valley Railroad. Most of the early residents were employed by the railroads or worked in the logging industry and sawmills.

Roxie's children attended the Roxie School, whose motto was Home of the Tigers. In 1962, the high school portion of the school shut down, and all students from grades 9 to 12 were bused to the new Franklin High School in Meadville. Roxie School continued for a few years after as an elementary school.

== Geography ==
Roxie is located in western Franklin County. U.S. Routes 84 and 98 pass through the town, leading east 11 miles (18 km) to Meadville, the county seat, and west 22 miles (35 km) to Natchez.

According to the United States Census Bureau, Roxie has a total area of 1.1 square miles (2.9 km^{2}), all land.

== Demographics ==
Historical population
Census	Pop.	Note	%±
1900	214		—
1910	294		37.4%
1920	207		−29.6%
1930	355		71.5%
1940	385		8.5%
1950	521		35.3%
1960	585		12.3%
1970	662		13.2%
1980	591		−10.7%
1990	568		−3.9%
2000	569		0.2%
2010	497		−12.7%
2020	469		−5.6%
U.S. Decennial Census

=== Racial and ethnic composition ===
Roxie town, Mississippi – Racial and ethnic composition Note: the US Census treats Hispanic/Latino as an ethnic category. This table excludes Latinos from the racial categories and assigns them to a separate category. Hispanics/Latinos may be of any race.
Race / Ethnicity (NH = Non-Hispanic)	Pop 2000	Pop 2010	Pop 2020	% 2000	% 2010	% 2020
White alone (NH)	225	190	170	39.54%	38.23%	36.25%
Black or African American alone (NH)	333	303	291	58.52%	60.97%	62.05%
Native American or Alaska Native alone (NH)	2	0	0	0.35%	0.00%	0.00%
Asian alone (NH)	0	0	0	0.00%	0.00%	0.00%
Native Hawaiian or Pacific Islander alone (NH)	0	0	0	0.00%	0.00%	0.00%
Other race alone (NH)	0	0	2	0.00%	0.00%	0.43%
Mixed race or Multiracial (NH)	6	4	3	1.05%	0.80%	0.64%
Hispanic or Latino (any race)	3	0	3	0.53%	0.00%	0.64%
Total	569	497	469	100.00%	100.00%	100.00%

=== 2020 census ===
As of the 2020 United States census, there were 469 people, 136 households, and 119 families residing in the town.

== Recreation ==
Significant forests and recreation areas are found nearby, including:

- Clear Springs Recreation Area, listed on the National Register of Historic Places
- Homochitto National Forest
- Sandy Creek Wildlife Management Area

== Education ==
Roxie is served by the Franklin County School District.

== Notable people ==
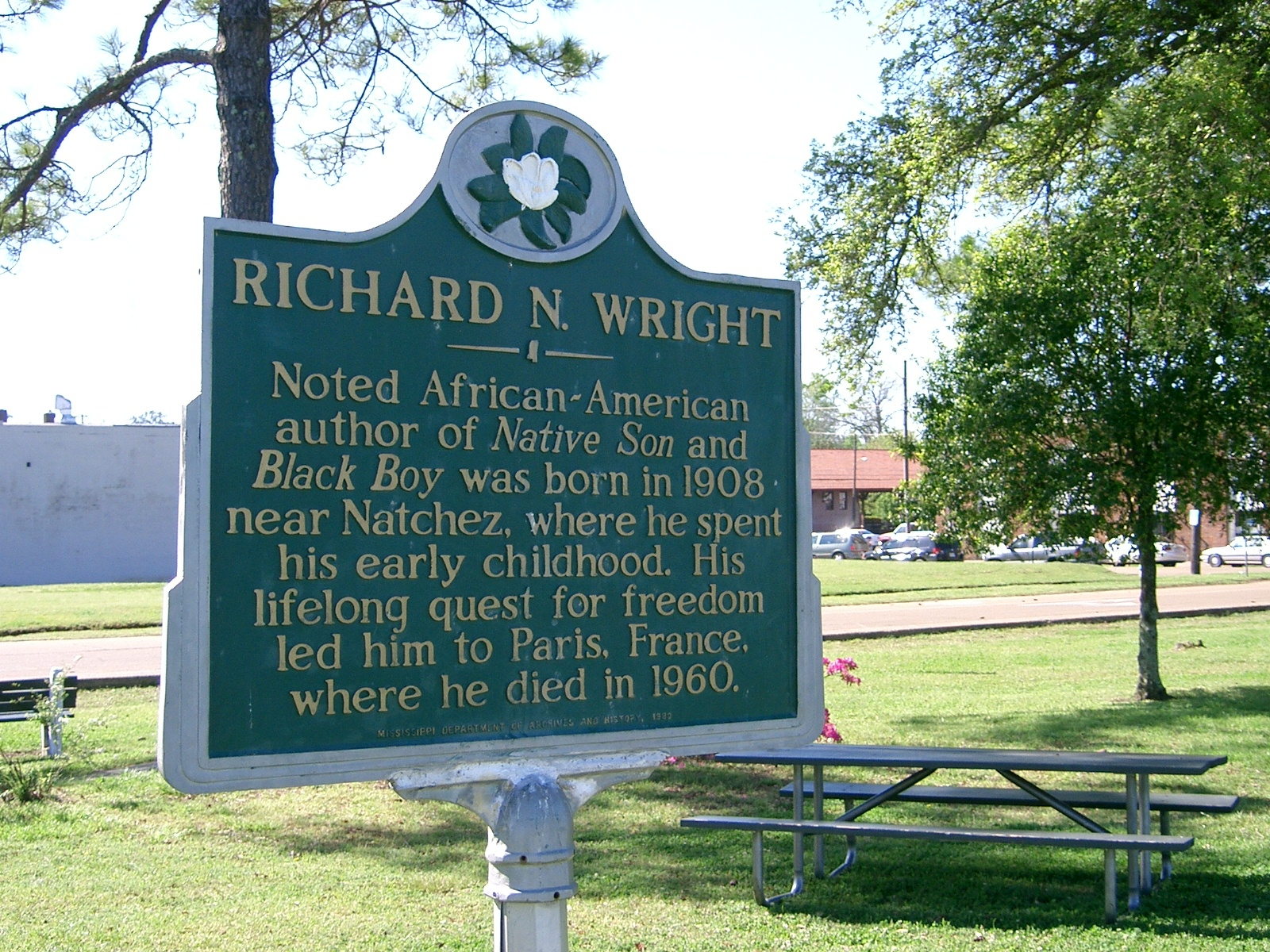
Commemorative plaque honoring Richard N. Wright at Natchez

- Cat Iron, blues singer and guitarist
- James Ford Seale, Ku Klux Klan member convicted of conspiracy and of the 1964 kidnappings of Henry Hezekiah Dee and Charles Eddie Moore, two young African-American men who were drowned by him and fellow conspirators.
- Richard Nathaniel Wright (1908 – 1960), African-American author of novels, short stories and non-fiction. Wright was the grandson of slaves, and much of his literature concerned racial themes, especially those involving the struggles of African-Americans during the late 19th to mid-20th centuries.
