= William Whittington (disambiguation) =

William Whittington was a US politician.

William Whittington may also refer to:

- William Whittington (MP) for Gloucestershire (UK Parliament constituency)
- Bill Whittington, American racing driver
