= David Leo Green =

American politician

Member of the Mississippi House of Representatives
- In office 1979–2005

Personal details
- Born: October 14, 1951 Rosetta, Mississippi, U.S.
- Died: July 25, 2014 (aged 62) Gloster, Mississippi, U.S.
- Party: Democratic
- Education: Southwest Mississippi Community College
- Occupation: Politician; retail Merchant; law enforcement officer

David Leo Green (October 14, 1951 – July 25, 2014) was an American politician.

Born in Rosetta, Mississippi, Green received his associate degree from Southwest Mississippi Community College and was a retail merchant. He was also a deputy sheriff and police officer. He lived in Gloster, Mississippi. Green served in the Mississippi House of Representatives from 1979 until 2005.

Green died July 25, 2014 at his home in Gloster, Mississippi. He was buried in the Purnell Family Cemetery in Garden City Franklin County, Mississippi.
