= Silver Dollar Group =

Ku Klux Klan organization

The Silver Dollar Group was an offshoot of the Ku Klux Klan white nationalist terrorist group, composed of cells that took up violent actions to support Klan goals. The group was largely found in Mississippi and Louisiana, and was named for their practice of identifying themselves by carrying a silver dollar. The group is believed to have had approximately twenty members. The group formed in 1964 at the Shamrock Motor Hotel in Vidalia, Louisiana by Raleigh Jackson "Red" Glover, amidst dissatisfaction at the lack of forceful action by Klan groups in the region.

The group killed a black man, Frank Morris, by arson in Ferriday, Louisiana, and is suspected in two car bombings of NAACP leaders in Natchez, Mississippi, George Metcalfe and Wharlest Jackson. Morris had a shoe repair shop in Ferriday, and died after his shoe repair shop was burned. The group is also suspected in the disappearance and murder of a black employee of the Shamrock Motel, Joseph Edwards. Some members of local law enforcement, including Concordia Parish Sheriff Department deputies Frank DeLaughter and Bill Ogden, were members of the Silver Dollar Group.

== 2007 prosecution ==
In 2007, Silver Dollar Group member James Ford Seale was charged and convicted for the May 1964 kidnapping of Henry Hezekiah Dee and Charles Eddie Moore, two black young men in Meadville, Mississippi.
