= Little Village (magazine) =

Alternative magazine in eastern Iowa

- Little Village cover dated December 2024
- Categories: News, Iowa, Politics, Arts
- Frequency: Monthly
- Circulation: 20,000
- Publisher: Jordan Sellergren
- Founded: 2001
- First issue: July 2001
- Country: United States
- Based in: Iowa City, Iowa, United States
- Language: English
- Website: https://littlevillagemag.com
- ISSN: 2328-3351 (print); 2328-3378 (web)
- OCLC: 839548994

Little Village is an independent, alternative newspaper based in Iowa City, Iowa, covering and distributing magazines throughout Eastern and Central Iowa. It is a member of the Association of Alternative Newsmedia.

== History ==
Little Village was founded in 2001 following the closing of its Iowa City precursor Icon, and expanded from Iowa City, Cedar Rapids, Quad Cities, Waterloo and Cedar Falls areas to Des Moines and Ames areas in 2022, and the Dubuque area in 2024.

In January 2025, the publication was purchased by former art director Jordan Sellergren, from Matthew Steele, owner from 2010—2024.

Little Village is recognized for its community and statewide reporting, environmental reporting, arts and culture coverage, and irreverent voice, occasionally using satire in its political coverage, as with its October 2018 cover, which references the Weekly World News' ongoing Bat Boy character, for the cover story Charles Grassley’s Legacy is in the Courts.

== Revenue and distribution model ==
Little Village is a for-profit publication with fiscal sponsorship from the Alternative Newsweekly Foundation. The majority of revenue comes from print and digital advertising, with a smaller portion of revenue coming from reader subscriptions, tax-deductible donations, creative services work and merchandise.

The magazine is distributed for free at over 800 businesses, organizations and newsstands throughout its distribution areas. The website, which publishes all content without the use of paywalls, is updated daily.
