= Greg Briggs =

American gridiron football player (born 1968)

No. 29, 43, 54
- Positions: Safety, linebacker

Personal information
- Born: October 19, 1968 (age 58); Meadville, Mississippi, U.S.
- Listed height: 6 ft 3 in (1.91 m)
- Listed weight: 214 lb (97 kg)

Career information
- High school: Franklin (Meadville)
- College: Texas Southern
- NFL draft: 1992: 5th round, 120th overall pick

Career history
- Dallas Cowboys (1992); Cleveland Browns (1993–1994)*; Frankfurt Galaxy (1995); Hamilton Tiger-Cats (1995)*; Dallas Cowboys (1995); Chicago Bears (1996); Minnesota Vikings (1997–1998)
- * Offseason or practice squad member only

Awards and highlights
- 2× Super Bowl champion (XXVII, XXX); World Bowl champion (III); All-SWAC (1991)

Career NFL statistics
- Fumble recoveries: 1
- Stats at Pro Football Reference

Greg Briggs (born October 19, 1968) is an American former professional football player who was a safety in the National Football League (NFL) for the Dallas Cowboys, Cleveland Browns, Chicago Bears and Minnesota Vikings. He was also a member of the Frankfurt Galaxy in Frankfurt Galaxy the World League of American Football (WLAF). He first enrolled at Copiah-Lincoln Community College before transferring to the University of Arkansas at Pine Bluff and Texas Southern University.

== Early life ==
Briggs attended Franklin High School in Meadville, Mississippi, where he focused on playing basketball. As a senior, he received All-district honors. He also practiced track.

He accepted a basketball scholarship from the Copiah-Lincoln Community College. He decided to try out for the football team in his third year there. In 1989, he started all of the games at free safety, compiling 6 interceptions, while receiving All-JUCO and All-state honors.

In 1990, he accepted a basketball scholarship from the University of Arkansas at Pine Bluff. The football coaching staff convinced him into changing sports. He played in the first two contests before being declared ineligible because of a class conflict. At the end of the season, the football program was suspended for 1991 by the NAIA, paving the way for Briggs and six of his teammates to walk-on at Texas Southern University, where the coach said he'd have to sleep on the floor because he didn't have an extra dorm room available.

As a senior, he began playing mostly in the nickel defense and on special teams. He became a starter at outside linebacker after the fourth game of the season, when a starter went down with an injury. He also combined the responsibilities of a safety and received All-SWAC honors. He recorded 42 tackles, 3 passes defensed, 2 sacks, one fumble recovery, one interception and one blocked kick. He was a teammate of future hall of fame player Michael Strahan.

== Professional career ==
=== Dallas Cowboys (first stint) ===
Briggs was selected by the Dallas Cowboys in the fifth round (120th) of the 1992 NFL draft, after impressing in the NFL Combine. He was tried at safety, before focusing on playing linebacker. On August 25, he was placed on the physically unable to perform list with a right hip injury. The team would go on to win Super Bowl XXVII. In 1993, he was switched to tight end, before being waived on August 24.

=== Cleveland Browns ===
On December 15, 1993, he was signed to the Cleveland Browns practice squad. He was waived on July 21, 1994.

=== Frankfurt Galaxy ===
After being out of football for a year, he played for the Frankfurt Galaxy of the World League of American Football in 1995, where he led his team in tackles and contributed to win World Bowl '95.

=== Hamilton Tiger-Cats ===
On July 20, 1995, he signed with the Hamilton Tiger-Cats of the Canadian Football League. He was released before the start of the season.

=== Dallas Cowboys (second stint) ===
Briggs was signed as a free agent by the Dallas Cowboys in 1995. He was released on August 27. He was re-signed on September 21. He played in 11 games, registering 9 special teams tackles and was a part of the Super Bowl XXX winning team. He wasn't re-signed after the season.

=== Chicago Bears ===
On June 6, 1996, he was signed by the Chicago Bears to play linebacker and special teams, reuniting with head coach and former Cowboys defensive coordinator Dave Wannstedt. He was waived on October 1. He was later re-signed on October 15.

=== Minnesota Vikings ===
In April 1997, he signed with the Minnesota Vikings, as a linebacker that was focused on playing special teams. He was cut on August 24, 1998.

== Personal life ==
After retiring from professional football, he traveled with Reggie White and spoke at churches. His nephew Diyral Briggs also played in the National Football League.
