= Rosetta, Mississippi =

Unincorporated community in Mississippi, United States

Rosetta
- Unincorporated community
- Location within the state of Mississippi
- Coordinates: 31°19′00″N 91°06′03″W
- Country: United States
- State: Mississippi
- County: Wilkinson
- Elevation: 161 ft (49 m)
- Time zone: UTC-6 (Central (CST))
  - Summer (DST): UTC-5 (CDT)
- GNIS feature ID: 694615

Rosetta is an unincorporated community in Wilkinson County, Mississippi.

Rosetta is located 0.8 mi (1.3 km) south of the Homochitto River, and is within the Homochitto National Forest.

== Notable people ==
- David Green, Mississippi state legislator and businessman, was born in Rosetta.
