= Quentin, Mississippi =

- Unincorporated community
- Location within Mississippi Location within the United States
- Coordinates: 31°30′21″N 90°45′15″W
- Country: United States
- State: Mississippi
- County: Franklin
- Elevation: 292 ft (89 m)
- Time zone: UTC-6 (Central (CST))
  - Summer (DST): UTC-5 (CDT)
- Area codes: 601 & 769
- GNIS feature ID: 694497

Quentin is an unincorporated community in Franklin County, Mississippi, United States.

Quentin is located on the former Mississippi Central Railroad.

A post office operated under the name Quentin from 1920 to 1980.

The Central Lumber Company operated a mill in Quentin from 1920 to 1952.
