= Todd Stauffer =

Todd Stauffer is co-founder and publisher of the Jackson Free Press in Jackson, Mississippi, and author of 40 nonfiction books on a variety of computer-related topics. He lives with his partner, journalist and editor Donna Ladd.

Stauffer and Ladd started the Jackson Free Press in 2002. They took the name from The Mississippi Free Press, a now-defunct investigative civil rights newspaper from the 1960s. The Jackson Free Press, which is free of charge and is supported entirely by advertising revenue, has a weekly circulation of 17,000. The most recent Media Audit figures indicate an actual readership of approximately 50,000, and its active Web site, which launched on a blogging platform in 2002, receives more than 500,000 page views per month.

In 2006, Stauffer received national attention for leading an effort to fight the efforts of the Gannett Company to control the distribution of locally owned publications in Mississippi. Stauffer became president of a new alliance to counter Gannett's efforts, called the Mississippi Independent Publisher's Association. Editor & Publisher magazine interviewed Stauffer about his efforts and wrote an editorial calling for Gannett to "halt" the TDN distribution scheme, which E&P called a violation of "the First Amendment right to distribute papers without unreasonable interference.

Stauffer, a critic of corporate media, received an Association of Alternative Newsweeklies award for his media criticism.

Stauffer wrote one of the earliest books on blogging and is now a national consultant for publications seeking to transition to the Internet, speaking at national and state newspaper gatherings, from the Association of Alternative Newsweeklies to the New York Press Association.

Stauffer is also a long-time media personality. He was co-host of the Emmy-winning "Disk Doctors" show on Knowledge TV in the 1990s. He was the host of Peak Computing Radio Hour in Denver, Colorado, and is currently the host of Radio JFP on WLEZ-FM in Jackson.
