= Veto, Mississippi =

- Unincorporated community
- Location within Mississippi Location within the United States
- Coordinates: 31°34′41″N 90°46′15″W
- Country: United States
- State: Mississippi
- County: Franklin
- Elevation: 289 ft (88 m)
- Time zone: UTC-6 (Central (CST))
  - Summer (DST): UTC-5 (CDT)
- Area codes: 601 & 769
- GNIS feature ID: 705208

Veto is an unincorporated community in Franklin County, Mississippi, United States.

In 1900, Veto had a population of 45 people.

A post office operated under the name Veto from 1858 to 1914.
