= Hamburg, Mississippi =

- Unincorporated community
- Location within Mississippi Location within the United States
- Coordinates: 31°34′44″N 91°04′00″W
- Country: United States
- State: Mississippi
- County: Franklin
- Elevation: 407 ft (124 m)
- Time zone: UTC-6 (Central (CST))
  - Summer (DST): UTC-5 (CDT)
- Area codes: 601 & 769
- GNIS feature ID: 693401

Hamburg is an unincorporated community in Franklin County, Mississippi, United States.

== History ==
Hamburg is located on the former Yazoo and Mississippi Valley Railroad. The community was incorporated in 1886 and unincorporated at a later date.

A post office operated under the name Hamburgh from 1838 to 1893 and under the name Hamburg from 1893 to 1965.

Hamburg was formerly home to three separate newspapers. The Franklin Herald was established in 1886 and operated in Hamburg until 1890, when the printing equipment was moved to Knoxville. The Hamburg Gazette was published weekly beginning in 1900. The Gusher was also published weekly by O. Q. Griffing beginning in 1901.

The Yazoo and Mississippi Valley Railroad operated a gravel pit in Hamburg.
