= Lucien, Mississippi =

- Unincorporated community
- Location within Mississippi Location within the United States
- Coordinates: 31°31′01″N 90°39′50″W
- Country: United States
- State: Mississippi
- County: Franklin
- Elevation: 325 ft (99 m)
- Time zone: UTC-6 (Central (CST))
  - Summer (DST): UTC-5 (CDT)
- Area codes: 601 & 769
- GNIS feature ID: 693841

Lucien is an unincorporated community in Franklin County, Mississippi, United States.

== History ==
Lucien is located on the former Mississippi Central Railroad. The community was named for a Mr. Lucien Scott and was once home to five stores and a cotton gin.

A post office operated under the name Lucien from 1907 to 1972.

Lucien was home to a school until it was consolidated with the school at McCall Creek.

The Central Lumber Company operated a mill in Lucien from 1916 to 1920.

Lucien is home to the Lucien Bridge, which is listed on the National Register of Historic Places.
