= Southwest Mississippi Community College =

Public college in Summit, Mississippi, US

Coordinates: 31°17′46.8″N 90°26′26.7″W

- Former names: Pike County Agricultural High School (1918–1932); Southwest Mississippi Junior College (1932–1988)
- Motto: "Opportunities for a Lifetime"
- Type: Community College
- Established: 1908
- President: J. Steven Bishop
- Students: 2000
- Location: Summit, Mississippi, United States
- Mascot: Bears
- Website: www.smcc.edu

Southwest Mississippi Community College is a public community college in unincorporated Pike County, Mississippi, in Summit, Mississippi

The college's district includes Pike, Amite, Walthall, and Wilkinson counties.

== History ==
The college was officially started in 1908 as an agricultural high school. The Pike County Agricultural High School opened on September 3, 1918, after receiving approval from the Pike County School Board the previous April. The high school began to incorporate college work into the curriculum in 1929 and by 1932 the school had become a junior college. Fifty-four years later in 1988, the name of the school was officially changed to Southwest Mississippi Community College.

== Notable alumni ==
- Woodie Assaf — meteorologist
- Jarrod Dyson — professional baseball player
- David Green — politician
- Billy Milner — professional football player
- Glover Quin — professional football player
- Nolan Wells - unsolved death
