= Eddiceton, Mississippi =

- Unincorporated community
- Location within Mississippi Location within the United States
- Coordinates: 31°30′08″N 90°47′29″W
- Country: United States
- State: Mississippi
- County: Franklin
- Elevation: 239 ft (73 m)
- Time zone: UTC-6 (Central (CST))
  - Summer (DST): UTC-5 (CDT)
- Area codes: 601 & 769
- GNIS feature ID: 693161

Eddiceton is an unincorporated community in Franklin County, Mississippi, United States. The community is located along U.S. Route 84 4.4 miles (7.1 km) northeast of Bude.

Eddiceton is located on the former Mississippi Central Railroad and was once home to a pine lumber mill.

A post office operated under the name Eddiceton from 1907 to 1983.

The Eddiceton Bridge, which is listed on the National Register of Historic Places, is located in Eddiceton.
