= Homochitto River =

River in Mississippi, United States

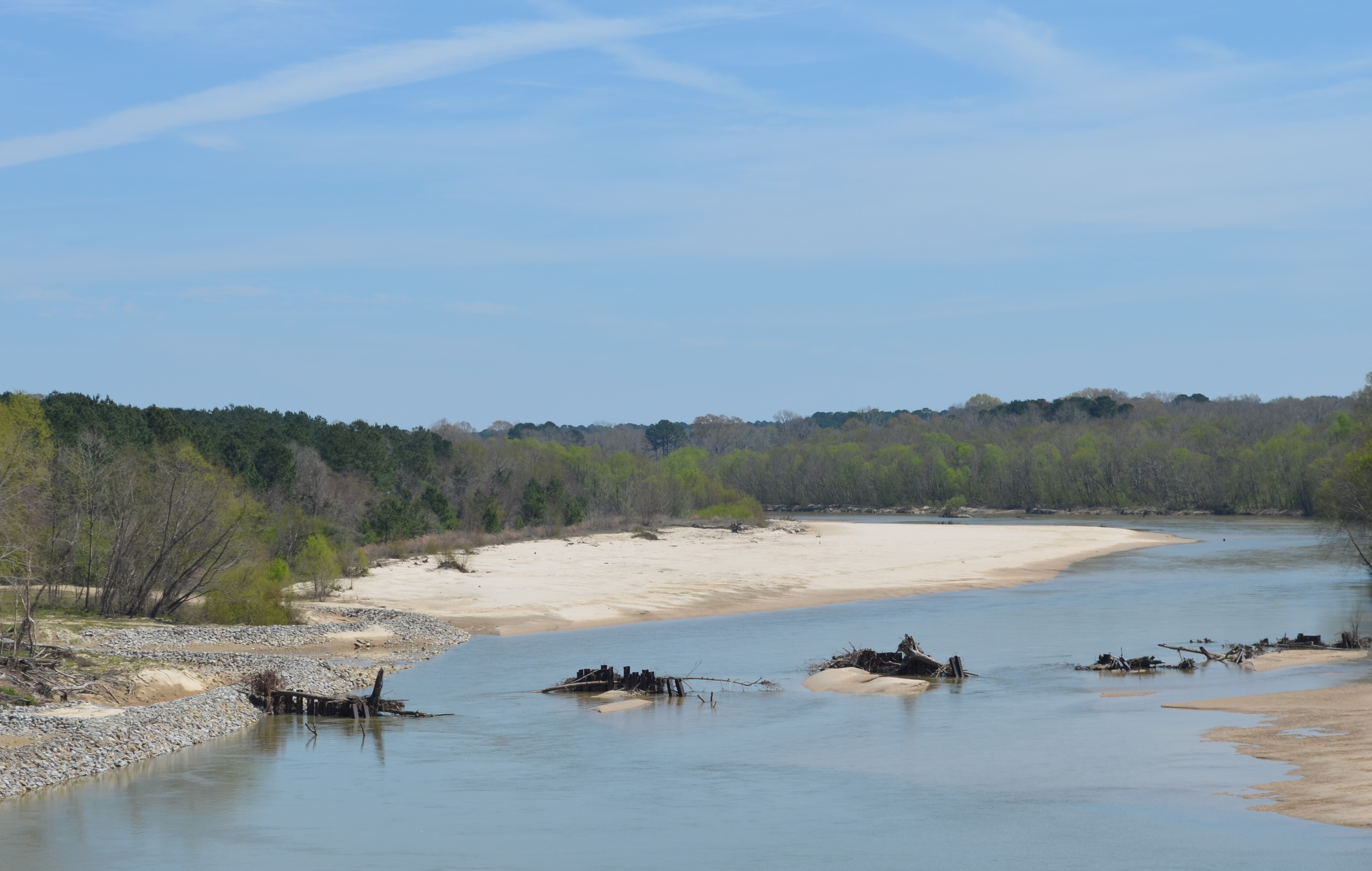

Location
- Country: United States
- State: Mississippi

Physical characteristics
- Source
  - coordinates: 31°42′16″N 90°37′28″W
  - elevation: 380 ft (120 m)
- Mouth: Mississippi River
  - coordinates: 31°12′53″N 91°31′41″W
  - elevation: 33 ft (10 m)
- Length: 90 mi (140 km)
- Basin size: 1,200 mi^{2} (3,100 km^{2})
- Discharge
  - location: Rosetta, MS
  - average: 1,156 cu ft/s (32.7 m^{3}/s)
  - minimum: 123 cu ft/s (3.5 m^{3}/s)
  - maximum: 118,000 cu ft/s (3,300 m^{3}/s)

Basin features
- Tributaries
  - left: South Fork Homochitto River
  - right: Middle Fork Homochitto River, West Fork Homochitto River

The Homochitto River (pronounced "ho-muh-CHIT-uh") is a river in the U.S. State of Mississippi. It flows from its source in southwest Mississippi for about 90 miles (145 km) west and south, emptying into the Mississippi River between Natchez and Woodville.

According to one source, Homochitto is a Choctaw name likely meaning "big red" and was described in the "New York Gazette" in 1773 by an anonymous writer who was encouraging settlement of British West Florida.

== Course ==
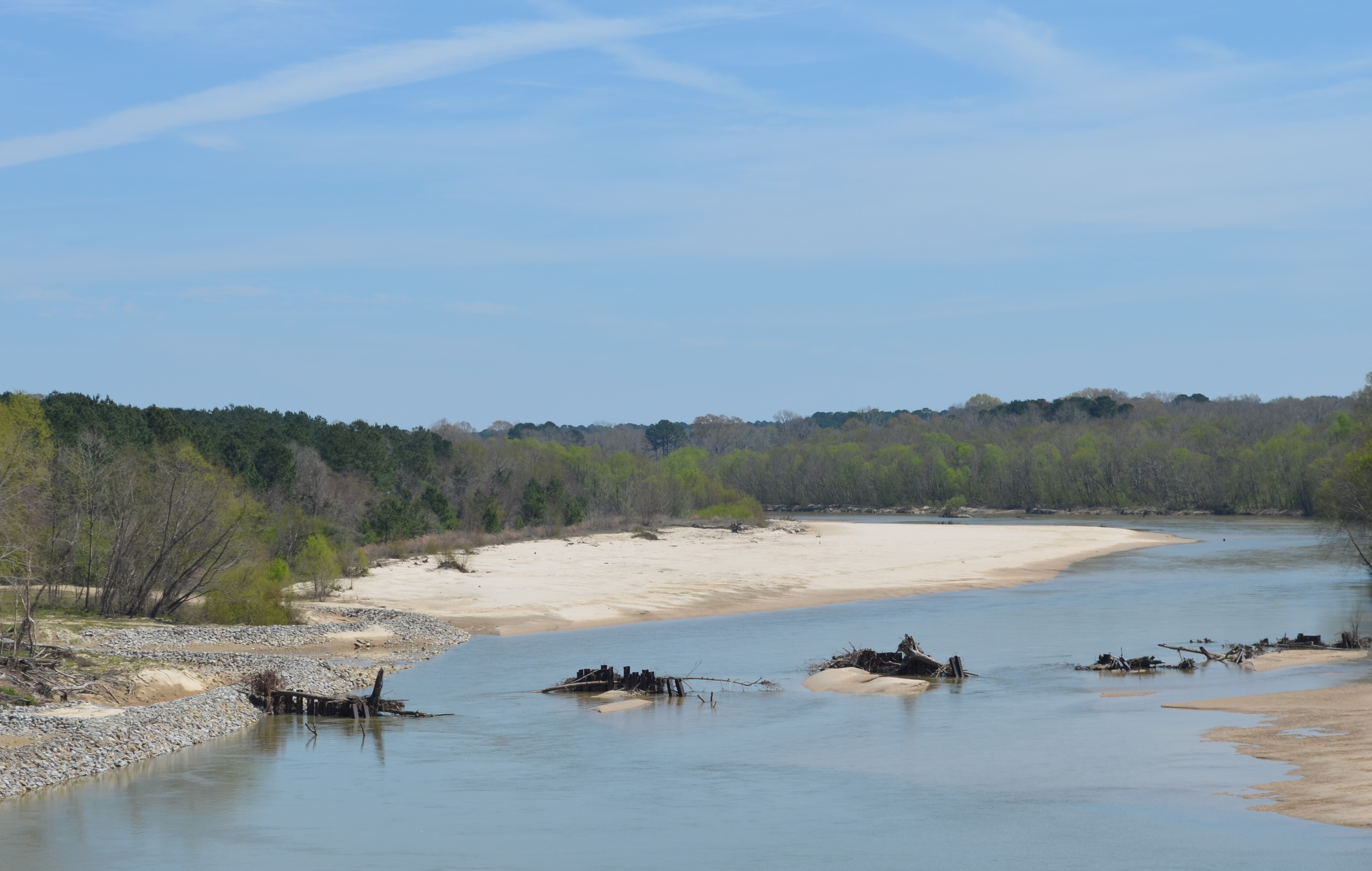
View of the Homochitto River from the Mississippi Highway 33 bridge. Remnants of a former bridge are evident in the water. Extensive erosion due to headcutting.

The Homochitto River originates in several headwater tributaries along the border between Copiah County and Lincoln County. It flows west and then south through the Homochitto National Forest. After passing through Lincoln County the river enters Franklin County, still flowing generally south.

Just before McCall Creek joins from the east, the Homochitto is crossed by two bridges, one for U.S. Route 84 and one for the Illinois Central Railroad. Then the river begins to flow southwest, passing by the town of Bude. Below Bude the river is crossed by U.S. Route 98. Not far below that the river is joined by the Middle Fork Homochitto River, from the north. Several miles downriver from there, the river becomes the boundary between Franklin and Amite counties, at which point it begins to flow more directly westward. On the south side the border between Amite County and Wilkinson County is located just east of the town of Rosetta.

At Rosetta the river is crossed by two bridges, one for Mississippi Highway 33 and one for the Illinois Central Railroad. Still flowing westward, the river flows through a broad floodplain. Once highly meandering, it has been straightened and channelized to a degree. On the north side Franklin County changes to Adams County. Near the town of Doloroso the Homochitto River is crossed by U.S. Route 61.

Below Doloroso the river originally flowed south, then west, to join the Mississippi River at Lake Mary, an Oxbow Lake formerly part of the main Mississippi channel. Today most of the Homochitto's water flows instead west from Doloroso, through the Abernathy Channel created in 1938 by the United States Army Corps of Engineers. Via this route the Homochitto River enters the Mississippi River several miles north of Lake Mary.

== River modification ==
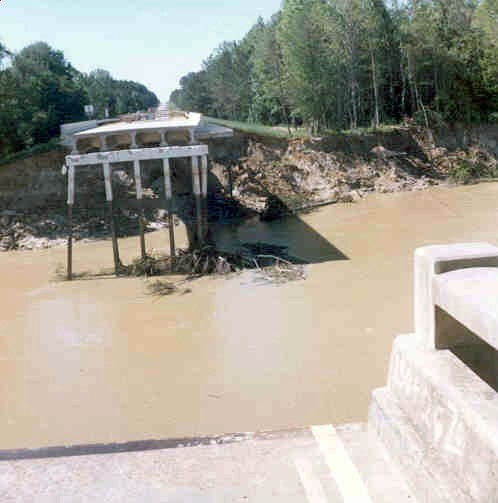
Mississippi Highway 33 bridge failure just north of Rosetta, Mississippi, caused by the April 1974 flood on the Homochitto River.

In 1938 the United States Army Corps of Engineers began channelizing the river by building the Abernathy Channel, a cutoff running from the Homochitto River near Doloroso to the Mississippi River about 15 miles (24 km) upstream from where the Homochitto originally emptied into the Mississippi. This reduced the river's length below Doloroso from about 20 miles (32 km) of meandering distributaries to a 9 miles (14 km) relatively straight outlet. Additional cutoffs between Doloroso and Rosetta were constructed in 1940, reducing the river's channel by about 4 miles (6 km).

Other flood control projects on the lower Homochitto, completed in 1952, included the cleaning and desnagging of the main channel, as well as the excavation of more cutoffs. All these projects were for the purpose of flood control along the lower Homochitto River. They had unintended consequences, as engineers did not fully understand river dynamics when undertaking these projects.

Since the channelization projects were completed, the lower Homochitto River and several of its tributaries have been degraded at an accelerated rate. The shortened channel has caused a greater streamflow velocity, increasing erosion and scour, which in turn causes bank sloughs and channel instability. Accelerated channel degradation probably began near the Mississippi River and moved up the Abernathy Channel during the early 1940s. It was noticeable at Doloroso by 1944 and at Kingston in 1947. Channel degradation at Rosetta began in the late 1940s.

This acceleration of erosional channel degradation has resulted in the collapse of several bridges. In 1955 a flood washed out the old U.S. Highway 61 bridge at Kingston, the Illinois Central Railroad bridge at Rosetta, and a country road bridge on the tributary Second Creek. In 1969 a bridge on the tributary Crooked Creek was washed out, and in 1971 the State Highway 33 bridge at Rosetta was washed out. During the flood of 1974 both the State Highway 33 bridge and the Illinois Central bridge at Rosetta were washed out.

== See also ==
- List of rivers in Mississippi
- Bridge scour
