= Lagniappe Daily =

Newspaper in Mobile, Alabama

- Type: Weekly newspaper and online news
- Format: Tabloid
- Owner(s): Something Extra Publishing, Inc.
- Publisher: Ashley Trice, Rob Holbert
- Founded: July 24, 2002
- Headquarters: 704 Government Street, Mobile, Alabama 36602 USA
- Circulation: 25,000 subscribers 80,000 weekly readers.
- Website: lagniappemobile.com

Lagniappe Daily is the largest independently owned weekly newspaper published in Mobile, Alabama. It features local news, music, events, arts, film and cuisine and for both Mobile and Baldwin counties including the communities of Fairhope, Daphne, Tillman's Corner, Theodore and Gulf Shores.

== History ==
Lagniappe was first published bi-weekly on July 24, 2002 by co-publishers Ashley Toland and Rob Holbert, who now serve as editor and managing editor respectively. The tabloid's original slogan was “Keep Mobile Funky!” Beginning April 2014, Lagniappe is published weekly. Since 2004, the Mobile Press Club has honored Lagniappe for its reporting and features. Lagniappe has also won several awards in the Alabama Press Association's Better Newspaper Contest, the Society of Professional Journalism's Green Eyeshades Awards and the Association of Alternative Newsweeklies' annual contest. In 2018, the Lagniappe was a finalist for the Mobile Area Chamber of Commerce's "Small Business of the Year" award.

Since 2003, Lagniappe has sponsored and hosted the annual "Nappie Awards", where favorite local people, places, and things are chosen by readers' votes.

On June 7, 2024, the newspaper adopted the online title "Lagniappe Daily."
