= Franklin County School District (Mississippi) =

School district in Mississippi

Address
- 41 First Street Meadville, Mississippi, 39653; United States

District information
- Type: Public
- Grades: PK–12
- Schools: 5
- NCES District ID: 2801530

Students and staff
- Students: 1,147 (2024–2025)
- Teachers: 143.00 (on an FTE basis) (2024–2025)
- Staff: 98.00 (on an FTE basis) (2024–2025)
- Student–teacher ratio: 8.02 (2024–2025)

The Franklin County School District is a public school district based in Meadville, Mississippi (USA). The district's boundaries parallel that of Franklin County.

== History ==
In 1958 Roxie High School's administration disallowed the display of the United States flag, getting criticism from John Farese, a member of the Mississippi House of Representatives.

== Schools ==
- Franklin High School (Grades 9-12)
- Franklin Middle School (Grades 7-8)
- Franklin Upper Elementary School (Grades 4-6)
- Franklin Lower Elementary School (Grades PK-3)

Football player Greg Briggs went to Franklin High. Defensive Back Cameron Young played football and basketball at the school.

== Demographics ==
=== 2006-07 school year ===
There were a total of 1,510 students enrolled in the Franklin County School District during the 2006–2007 school year. The gender makeup of the district was 47% female and 53% male. The racial makeup of the district was 46.42% African American, 53.44% White, 0.07% Hispanic, and 0.07% Native American. 58.9% of the district's students were eligible to receive free lunch.

=== Previous school years ===
School Year	Enrollment	Gender Makeup		Racial Makeup				
School Year	Enrollment	Female	Male	Asian	African American	Hispanic	Native American	White
2005-06	1,597	47%	53%	–	49.47%	–	0.06%	50.47%
2004-05	1,554	47%	53%	–	48.97%	–	0.06%	50.97%
2003-04	1,568	46%	54%	–	49.81%	–	0.06%	50.13%
2002-03	1,609	47%	53%	–	51.15%	–	–	48.85%

== Accountability statistics ==
	2006-07	2005-06	2004-05	2003-04	2002-03
District Accreditation Status	Accredited	Accredited	Accredited	Accredited	Accredited
School Performance Classifications
Level 5 (Superior Performing) Schools	0	0	0	0	0
Level 4 (Exemplary) Schools	1	0	1	2	0
Level 3 (Successful) Schools	2	3	2	1	3
Level 2 (Under Performing) Schools	0	0	0	0	0
Level 1 (Low Performing) Schools	0	0	0	0	0
Not Assigned	1	0	0	0	0

== See also ==
- List of school districts in Mississippi
