= Charles Walton Beam House =

Historic house in Mississippi, United States

- U.S. National Register of Historic Places
- Location within Mississippi Location within the United States
- Nearest city: McCall Creek, Mississippi
- Area: 17 acres (6.9 ha)
- Architectural style: Greek Revival
- NRHP reference No.: 90000437
- Added to NRHP: March 21, 1990

The Charles Walton Beam House, also known as the Walter Cowart House, is a historic house in McCall Creek, Mississippi, U.S.. It was built in the 1850s for Charles Walton Beam, a landowner and politician. It was designed in the Greek Revival architectural style. It has been listed on the National Register of Historic Places since March 21, 1990.
