= Murder of Wharlest Jackson =

American civil rights activist (1929–1967)

Wharlest Jackson (December 7, 1929 – February 27, 1967) was an American civil rights activist who was murdered by a car bomb, with evidence of involvement by the Silver Dollar Group, a white supremacy organization affiliated with the Ku Klux Klan. The case was officially closed by the United States Department of Justice in 2017. Although it names a number of suspects from the original interviews in the 1960s, as of 2026, it remains officially an unsolved murder.

== Biography ==
Wharlest Jackson was born in Millers Ferry, Washington County, Florida on December 7, 1929 to Willie F. Jackson and Effie Jackson (née Washington). He lived on Vernon Road in Millers Ferry with his mother, father and his siblings Henrietta, Dora D, Ola Rea, Louis Robert, Warren and Doris Lee until his mother died April 2, 1934. His father Willie was listed as a laborer on the family farm with his family in 1920, a sawmill laborer on the 1930 Federal census and as a farmer on the 1935 Florida census. His father later went on to become a reverend. In 1940 Wharlest and his siblings are listed on the federal census living with his paternal grandmother Henrietta Jackson and his uncles Martin and Frank Jackson. This census lists them as living in "The St. Luke Negro Settlement" in Millers Ferry.

Jackson was a Korean War veteran. He was married to Exerlena Jackson on February 17, 1954. Together they had five children, Debra Jackson (Sylvester), Denise Jackson (Ford), Doris Jackson, Delerisia Jackson and Wharlest Jackson Jr.

== Murder ==
In August 1965, two years before Jackson's murder, similar circumstances led to the serious injury of Jackson's friend, George Metcalfe. George was the president of the local Natchez, Mississippi branch of the NAACP (National Association for the Advancement of Colored People) and Wharlest worked under him as its treasurer. After receiving a promotion at Armstrong Rubber and Tire Company, Metacalfe got into his car and started the ignition, triggering a similar explosion which severely injured him. The Jackson family took him in and nursed him back to health until he returned to his job a year later. No one was ever charged for that crime either.

Wharlest Jackson along with his wife Exerlena Jackson, also worked at the Armstrong Rubber and Tire Company for twelve years. The company had several white employees who were affiliated with the Ku Klux Klan, and under pressure from civil rights activists, the company's management had offered more positions to African Americans and it also promoted Jackson to a more advanced explosives-mixing position, a position that had previously only been held by whites. The promotion was heavily opposed by his wife, but the pay of 17 cents an hour meant that his wife could quit her job as a cook at an all-black school and spend more time with their children. Wharlest's wife, later commented "I begged him not to take that job".

Jackson was assassinated by a car bomb, which was placed on the frame of his truck under the driver-side seat. The bomb exploded at approximate 8 p.m. on February 27, 1967. The explosion occurred when he switched on his turn signal on his way home. The explosion caused serious damage to Wharlest's lower torso and he died at the scene. The scene of his death was six blocks away from the Armstrong Rubber and Tire Company where he was employed.

The person who first came upon Wharlest Jackson after the accident was his son, Wharlest Jackson Jr., who recounted "When I made it to him he was lying in the street... his shoe was blown off and the truck was mangled".

In the immediate aftermath of his murder, Charles Evers led protests at the Armstrong Tire plant and allegeded the company had harbored Klansmen for a long time.

A culprit was never prosecuted. The FBI suspected the involvement of the Silver Dollar Group, an offshoot of the Ku Klux Klan. After ten thousand pages of FBI documentation and evidence, the Department of Justice named three other possible suspects and at the same time closed the case in July 2017.

== Legacy ==
The Armstrong Tire and Rubber plant where Jackson worked eventually closed in 2001.

Jackson's former home at 13 Matthews Street in Natchez was placed on the National Register of Historic Places in Adams County in 2017.

The PBS Frontline documentary, American Reckoning (season 40, episode 6), aired in February 2022, and looked deeper at the unsolved case.

== See also ==
- List of unsolved murders (1900–1979)
- National Register of Historic Places listings in Adams County, Mississippi
