= Knoxville, Mississippi =

- Unincorporated community
- Location within Mississippi Location within the United States
- Coordinates: 31°22′44″N 91°07′15″W
- Country: United States
- State: Mississippi
- County: Franklin
- Elevation: 141 ft (43 m)
- Time zone: UTC-6 (Central (CST))
  - Summer (DST): UTC-5 (CDT)
- Area codes: 601 & 769
- GNIS feature ID: 693669

Knoxville is an unincorporated community in Franklin County, Mississippi, United States.

== History ==
Knoxville is located on the former Yazoo and Mississippi Valley Railroad. The community was incorporated in 1886 and named for Knoxville, Tennessee.

A post office operated under the name Knoxville from 1849 to 1955.

The Knoxville White Male and Female Academy was opened in Knoxville in 1886.
