= McCall Creek, Mississippi =

- Unincorporated community
- Location within Mississippi Location within the United States
- Coordinates: 31°30′46″N 90°41′55″W
- Country: United States
- State: Mississippi
- County: Franklin
- Elevation: 289 ft (88 m)
- Time zone: UTC-6 (Central (CST))
  - Summer (DST): UTC-5 (CDT)
- Zip code: 39647
- Area codes: 601 & 769
- GNIS feature ID: 673288

McCall Creek is an unincorporated community in Franklin County, Mississippi. It is located in eastern Franklin County, approximately two miles west of the Franklin-Lincoln County line, and is traversed by U.S. Route 84.

The community was founded by European Americans in the early 1900s and was named for the McCall family, early settlers. In 1911, the community was incorporated as the village of McCall. The village had a recorded population of 140 at the 1920 census and 169 in 1930. Thereafter, the community reverted to unincorporated status.

Today, McCall Creek has a store and sawmill. It has a post office, with the ZIP code 39647. The additional two lanes went in north of the existing two-lane road.

The Charles Walton Beam House is located in McCall Creek and is listed on the National Register of Historic Places.

== Notable people ==
- G.C. Cameron, lead singer of soul group the Spinners
- Jamie Collins, professional football player
- Oscar Lofton, professional football player and coach
