= Association of Alternative Newsmedia =

Organization

Association of Alternative Newsmedia ("AAN Publishers")
- Abbreviation: AAN
- Formation: 1978; 48 years ago
- Tax ID no.: 91-1250071
- Legal status: 501(c)(6) nonprofit organization
- Headquarters: Jackson, Miss., U.S.
- Region served: metropolitan areas in 32 states, Washington D.C., Sydney, Australia
- Members: 120
- President: Jimmy Boegle
- Executive Director: Todd Stauffer
- Affiliations: Alternative Newsweekly Foundation
- Revenue: $446,000 (2023)
- Expenses: $302,000 (2023)
- Employees: 3 (2024)
- Website: www.aan.org
- Formerly called: Association of Alternative Newsweeklies

The Association of Alternative Newsmedia ("AAN Publishers") is a trade association of alternative weekly newspapers and other local publishers in North America. It provides services to many independently owned and operated publishers focused on local politics, investigations, arts, entertainment and nightlife coverage. AAN also operates AANWire.com, an aggregator of AAN Publisher content.

== History ==
The Association of Alternative Newsweeklies was founded in 1978 in Seattle, Washington, with 30 newspapers from America's largest cities.

In July 2011, the organization's name was changed to the Association of Alternative Newsmedia by a vote of members attending the group's annual meeting.

In July 2022, it listed 88 members on its website, down from 135 in 2009.

In July 2024, the name was updated to AAN Publishers to reflect the increasing diversity of its roughly 120 member publications, including a number of non-profit, LGBTQ+ focused and smaller Web-only newsrooms.

== Members ==
The association is made up of about 120 publications published in the 32 U.S. states, Washington, D.C., and Sydney, Australia.

Publication	City	State
Afro LA	Los Angeles	CA
The American Prospect	National	US
Arkansas Times	Little Rock	AR
The Austin Chronicle	Austin	TX
Baltimore Beat	Baltimore	MD
BenitoLink	San Benito County	CA
Bentonville Bulletin	Bentonville	AR
Black Belt News Network	Dallas	GA
BlueDot Living	Martha's Vineyard	MA
Boise Weekly	Boise	ID
Boulder Weekly	Boulder	CO
Bucket List Community Cafe	Denver	CO
Bucks County Beacon	Bucks County	PA
Burlington Buzz	Burlington	MA
Canopy Atlanta	Atlanta	GA
Charleston City Paper	Charleston	SC
Chicago Reader	Chicago	IL
Chico News & Review	Chico	CA
Chronogram	Kingston	NY
Cincinnati CityBeat	Cincinnati	OH
City Magazine	Rochester	NY
Cleveland Scene	Cleveland	OH
Coachella Valley Independent	Palm Springs	CA
Creative Loafing (Tampa)	Tampa	FL
C-Ville Weekly	Charlottesville	VA
Dallas Observer	Dallas	TX
Dallas Voice	Dallas	TX
Dallas Weekly	Dallas	TX
Deceleration	San Antonio	TX
East Bay Express	Oakland	CA
Epicenter NYC	New York	NY
Erie Reader	Erie	PA
Eugene Weekly	Eugene	OR
Flagpole Magazine	Athens	GA
Folio Weekly	Jacksonville	FL
Fort Worth Weekly	Fort Worth	TX
Gambit Weekly	New Orleans	LA
Georgia Voice	Atlanta	GA
Good Times Santa Cruz	Santa Cruz	CA
Houston Press	Houston	TX
Illinois Times	Springfield	IL
Indy Weekly	Durham	NC
Inlander	Pullman	WA
Isthmus	Madison	WI
Kingston Springs Gazette	Nashville	TN
J. Weekly	San Francisco	CA
Lagniappe	Mobile	AL
Lansing City Pulse	Lansing	MI
Las Vegas Weekly	Henderson	NV
LEO Weekly	Louisville	KY
Little Village	Iowa City	IA
Lookout	Phoenix	AZ
Memphis Flyer	Memphis	TN
Metro Silicon Valley	San Jose	CA
Metro Times	Detroit	MI
Miami New Times	Miami	FL
Mississippi Free Press	Jackson	MS
Monterey County Weekly	Seaside	CA
Mountain Xpress	Asheville	NC
Nashville Scene	Nashville	TN
New Times	San Luis Obispo	CA
Newsberg	Newberg	OR
North Bay Bohemian	Santa Rosa	CA
North Coast Journal	Eureka	CA
Oklahoma Gazette	Oklahoma City	OK
Open Vallejo	Vallejo	CA
Orlando Weekly	Orlando	FL
Pacific Sun	San Rafael	CA
Palo Alto Weekly	Palo Alto	CA
Philadelphia Gay News	Philadelphia	PA
Phoenix New Times	Phoenix	AZ
The Pitch	Kansas City	MO
Pittsburgh City Paper	Pittsburgh	PA
Planet Detroit	Detroit	MI
The Portland Mercury	Portland	OR
QBurgh	Pittsburgh	PA
Queen City Nerve	Charlotte	NC
Random Lengths News	San Pedro	CA
Reno News & Review	Reno	NV
Reno News & Review	Reno	NV
Rockton-Roscoe News	Roscoe	IL
Rural Intelligence	Kingston	NY
Sacramento News & Review	Sacramento	CA
Salt Lake City Weekly	Salt Lake City	UT
San Antonio Current	San Antonio	TX
San Diego Reader	San Diego	CA
San Francisco Public Press	San Francisco	CA
Santa Barbara Independent	Santa Barbara	CA
Santa Fe Reporter	Santa Fe	NM
Santa Maria Sun	Santa Maria	CA
Sauce Magazine	St. Louis	MO
Seven Days	Burlington	VT
Shepherd Express	Milwaukee	WI
Smoky Mountain News	Waynesville	NC
Source Weekly	Bend	OR
STET News	Palm Beach	FL
Sydney Citu Hub	Sydney	AUS
The Stranger	Seattle	WA
Style Weekly	Richmond	VA
The 9th Street Journal	Durham	NC
The Almanac	Menlo Park	CA
The Bowie Sun	Bowie	MD
The Current	Lafayette	LA
The Daily Catch	Red Hook	NY
The Frisc	San Francisco	CA
The Jersey Vindicator	Trenton	NJ
The JOLT	Olympia	WA
The Lens	New Orleans	LA
The Paper	Albuquerque	NM
The Real News Network	Baltimore	MD
Toledo City Paper	Toledo	OH
Truthout	National	US
Tucson Sentinel	Tucson	AZ
Vallejo Sun	Vallejo	CA
Valley Sentinel	Spring Green	WI
Verified News Network	Broken Arrow	OK
Volume One	Eau Clare	WI
Washington City Paper	Washington	DC
Watermark Out News	Orlando	FL
Westword	Denver	CO
Windy City Times	Chicago	IL
Worcester Magazine	Worcester	MA
Yellow Scene	Boulder	CO

=== Former members ===
Publication	City	State	Status	Year Ended
Baltimore City Paper	Baltimore	MD	Discontinued	2017
Bay Guardian	San Francisco	CA	Publication discontinued	2014
Boston Phoenix	Boston	MA	Publication discontinued	2013
Las Vegas CityLife	Las Vegas	NV	Publication discontinued	2014
Portland Phoenix	Portland	ME	Publication discontinued	2023
Providence Phoenix	Providence	RI	Publication discontinued	2014
The Village Voice	New York	NY	Ownership change	

== See also ==
- Alternative Press Syndicate
- Institute for Nonprofit News
