= Mississippi Business Journal =

American monthly newspaper

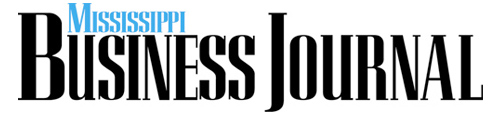
- January 16, 2012 issue of the Mississippi Business Journal
- Type: Business newspaper
- Format: Tabloid
- Owner: Scott Coopwood
- Founder: Joe Dove
- Editor: Pam Parker and Jack Criss
- Founded: 1979; 47 years ago
- Language: English
- Headquarters: Cleveland, Mississippi
- Circulation: 5,000
- ISSN: 0195-0002
- OCLC number: 60620296
- Website: msbusinessjournal.com

The Mississippi Business Journal is a statewide monthly business newspaper, located in Cleveland, Mississippi.

Each issue contains news coverage relating to the Mississippi business world along with regular opinion and freelance columns. Issues are sold statewide and feature a special list that accompanies that week's editorial focus, issues ranging from health care and economic development to banking and law.

The journal hosts holds numerous awards programs honoring the state's business community.

== History ==
The newspaper was established in 1979 by Joe Dove, former business editor of The Clarion-Ledger. He led the newspaper until 1984 when he sold it to Richard Roper, head of Downhome Publications and publisher of Mississippi Magazine. Two years later Roper sold the publication to Rosa Lee Harden Jones. Publisher Joe D. Joes became a part-owner in 1995 along with editor Buddy Bynum. The group sold the journal in 2007 to the Dolan Media Company. It was then acquired in 2012 by Journal Inc., parent company of the Northeast Mississippi Daily Journal. In June 2024, Journal Inc. sold the newspaper to Scott Coopwood.
