= Franklin County, Mississippi =

County in Mississippi, United States

- County
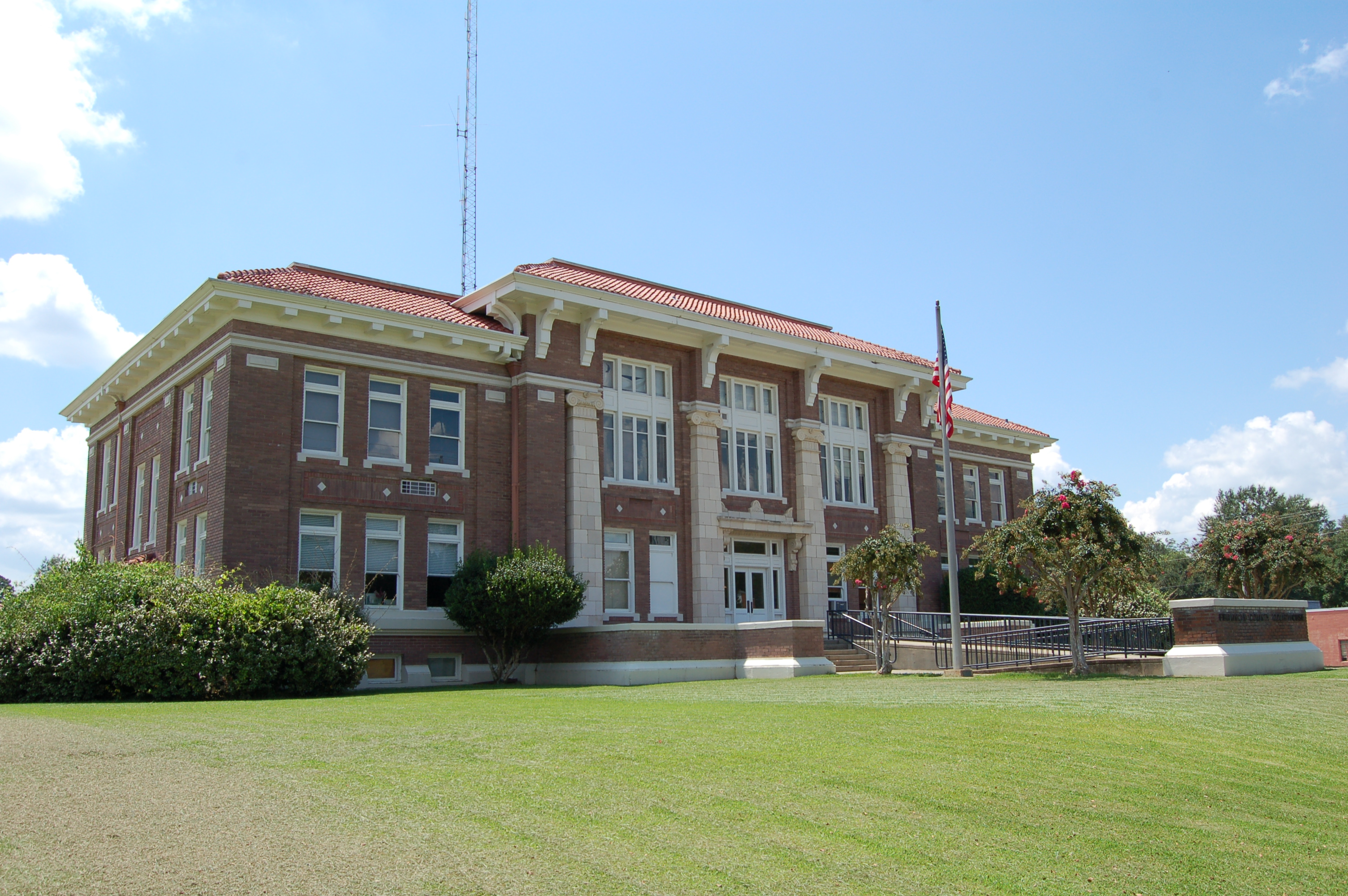
- Franklin County Courthouse, Meadville, Mississippi.

- Location within the U.S. state of Mississippi
- Coordinates: 31°29′N 90°54′W
- Country: United States
- State: Mississippi
- Founded: 1809
- Named for: Benjamin Franklin
- Seat: Meadville
- Largest town: Bude

Area
  - Total: 567 sq mi (1,470 km^{2})
  - Land: 564 sq mi (1,460 km^{2})
  - Water: 3.0 sq mi (7.8 km^{2}) 0.5%

Population (2020)
  - Total: 7,675
  - Estimate (2025): 7,491 ▼
  - Density: 13.6/sq mi (5.25/km^{2})
- Time zone: UTC−6 (Central)
  - Summer (DST): UTC−5 (CDT)
- Congressional district: 3rd
- Website: franklincoms.weebly.com

Franklin County is a county located in the U.S. state of Mississippi. As of the 2020 census, the population was 7,675. Its county seat is Meadville. The county was formed on December 21, 1809, from portions of Adams County and named for Founding Father Benjamin Franklin. It is bisected by the Homochitto River, which runs diagonally through the county from northeast to southwest.

== History ==
This was the fourth county organized in Mississippi. It was initially developed for agriculture, specifically cotton plantations based on enslaved labor of African Americans. Cotton continued to be important to the economy through the 19th century and into the early 20th century.

This still rural county has had a decline in population by about half since 1910. It is the fourth least populous county in the state. Mechanization of agriculture and the blight of the boll weevil both reduced the need for farm workers; they left the area and often the state. Many African Americans went north or west in the Great Migration before and after World War II. The county in the 21st century is majority white in population; in the 2000 census, African Americans composed more than 36% of the population. (See Demographics section below.)

As in the rest of the state, the county had racially segregated facilities under Jim Crow from the late 19th century. Many white residents opposed the civil rights movement of the mid-20th century. In May 1964, Ku Klux Klan members abducted and killed two young black men, Henry Hezekiah Dee and Charles Eddie Moore of Meadville, before Freedom Summer started. Their bodies were not discovered in the Mississippi River until July 1964, during the hunt for three disappeared civil rights workers.

No one was prosecuted at the time, but the case was reopened in 2007, after a documentary had been released on it by Canadian Broadcasting Company. Local man James Ford Seale was convicted of the kidnappings and deaths by an all-white jury in federal court. In 2008 the families of Dee and Moore filed a civil suit against the Franklin County government, charging complicity by its law enforcement in the deaths. On June 21, 2010, Franklin County agreed to an undisclosed settlement in the civil suit with the families of Charles Moore and Henry Dee.

== Geography ==
According to the U.S. Census Bureau, the county has a total area of 567 square miles (1,470 km^{2}), of which 564 square miles (1,460 km^{2}) is land and 3.0 square miles (7.8 km^{2}) (0.5%) is water.

=== Major highways ===
- U.S. Highway 84
- U.S. Highway 98
- Mississippi Highway 33
- Mississippi Highway 184

=== Adjacent counties ===
- Jefferson County (north)
- Lincoln County (east)
- Amite County (south)
- Wilkinson County (southwest)
- Adams County (west)

=== National protected area ===
- Homochitto National Forest (part)

== Communities ==
=== Towns ===
- Bude
- Meadville
- Roxie

=== Unincorporated communities ===
- Eddiceton
- Hamburg
- Knoxville
- Little Springs
- Lucien
- McCall Creek
- Quentin
- Veto

== Demographics ==
Historical population
Census	Pop.	Note	%±
1810	2,016		—
1820	3,821		89.5%
1830	4,622		21.0%
1840	4,775		3.3%
1850	5,904		23.6%
1860	8,265		40.0%
1870	7,498		−9.3%
1880	9,729		29.8%
1890	10,424		7.1%
1900	13,678		31.2%
1910	15,193		11.1%
1920	14,156		−6.8%
1930	12,268		−13.3%
1940	12,504		1.9%
1950	10,929		−12.6%
1960	9,286		−15.0%
1970	8,011		−13.7%
1980	8,208		2.5%
1990	8,377		2.1%
2000	8,448		0.8%
2010	8,118		−3.9%
2020	7,675		−5.5%
2025 (est.)	7,491	▼	−2.4%
U.S. Decennial Census; 1790-1960 1900-1990; 1990-2000 2010-2013

=== Racial and ethnic composition ===
Franklin County, Mississippi – Racial and ethnic composition Note: the US Census treats Hispanic/Latino as an ethnic category. This table excludes Latinos from the racial categories and assigns them to a separate category. Hispanics/Latinos may be of any race.
Race / Ethnicity (NH = Non-Hispanic)	Pop 1980	Pop 1990	Pop 2000	Pop 2010	Pop 2020	% 1980	% 1990	% 2000	% 2010	% 2020
White alone (NH)	5,135	5,277	5,286	5,230	4,910	62.56%	62.99%	62.57%	64.42%	63.97%
Black or African American alone (NH)	3,038	3,074	3,048	2,776	2,563	37.01%	36.70%	36.08%	34.20%	33.39%
Native American or Alaska Native alone (NH)	0	1	18	14	2	0.00%	0.01%	0.21%	0.17%	0.03%
Asian alone (NH)	10	4	6	5	8	0.12%	0.05%	0.07%	0.06%	0.10%
Native Hawaiian or Pacific Islander alone (NH)	x	x	0	0	0	x	x	0.00%	0.00%	0.00%
Other race alone (NH)	0	0	0	1	12	0.00%	0.00%	0.00%	0.01%	0.16%
Mixed race or Multiracial (NH)	x	x	45	45	120	x	x	0.53%	0.55%	1.56%
Hispanic or Latino (any race)	25	21	45	47	60	0.30%	0.25%	0.53%	0.58%	0.78%
Total	8,208	8,377	8,448	8,118	7,675	100.00%	100.00%	100.00%	100.00%	100.00%

=== 2020 census ===
As of the 2020 census, the county had a population of 7,675. The median age was 46.3 years. 20.9% of residents were under the age of 18 and 22.4% of residents were 65 years of age or older. For every 100 females there were 96.0 males, and for every 100 females age 18 and over there were 93.9 males age 18 and over.

The racial makeup of the county was 64.1% White, 33.7% Black or African American, 0.1% American Indian and Alaska Native, 0.1% Asian, <0.1% Native Hawaiian and Pacific Islander, 0.2% from some other race, and 1.8% from two or more races. Hispanic or Latino residents of any race comprised 0.8% of the population.

<0.1% of residents lived in urban areas, while 100.0% lived in rural areas.

There were 3,295 households in the county, of which 26.6% had children under the age of 18 living in them. Of all households, 44.8% were married-couple households, 21.7% were households with a male householder and no spouse or partner present, and 29.9% were households with a female householder and no spouse or partner present. About 32.8% of all households were made up of individuals and 16.0% had someone living alone who was 65 years of age or older.

There were 4,284 housing units, of which 23.1% were vacant. Among occupied housing units, 83.3% were owner-occupied and 16.7% were renter-occupied. The homeowner vacancy rate was 1.5% and the rental vacancy rate was 9.3%.

== Politics ==
United States presidential election results for Franklin County, Mississippi
Year	Republican		Democratic		Third party(ies)	
Year	No.	%	No.	%	No.	%
1912	4	1.10%	301	82.69%	59	16.21%
1916	22	2.76%	769	96.49%	6	0.75%
1920	203	23.97%	641	75.68%	3	0.35%
1924	36	5.74%	591	94.26%	0	0.00%
1928	181	16.67%	905	83.33%	0	0.00%
1932	25	2.53%	965	97.47%	0	0.00%
1936	33	2.91%	1,098	96.83%	3	0.26%
1940	29	2.06%	1,376	97.94%	0	0.00%
1944	49	3.89%	1,211	96.11%	0	0.00%
1948	12	0.98%	55	4.48%	1,160	94.54%
1952	514	30.60%	1,166	69.40%	0	0.00%
1956	177	11.46%	862	55.83%	505	32.71%
1960	124	7.38%	441	26.25%	1,115	66.37%
1964	2,211	96.05%	91	3.95%	0	0.00%
1968	231	6.71%	782	22.72%	2,429	70.57%
1972	2,361	78.73%	561	18.71%	77	2.57%
1976	1,719	50.63%	1,578	46.48%	98	2.89%
1980	2,026	49.31%	2,040	49.65%	43	1.05%
1984	2,564	62.86%	1,494	36.63%	21	0.51%
1988	2,376	59.97%	1,563	39.45%	23	0.58%
1992	1,942	49.31%	1,587	40.30%	409	10.39%
1996	1,586	47.50%	1,381	41.36%	372	11.14%
2000	2,427	61.40%	1,486	37.59%	40	1.01%
2004	2,893	64.42%	1,574	35.05%	24	0.53%
2008	2,909	62.09%	1,733	36.99%	43	0.92%
2012	2,735	60.87%	1,726	38.42%	32	0.71%
2016	2,721	63.43%	1,502	35.01%	67	1.56%
2020	2,923	65.52%	1,480	33.18%	58	1.30%
2024	2,831	69.63%	1,213	29.83%	22	0.54%

In the 1964 Presidential election Barry Goldwater reportedly received 96.05% of the county's vote. Although the white-majority county has supported Southern Democrats such as Jimmy Carter for the presidency, since 2000 the Republican candidate has consistently received over 60% of the vote.

== Education ==
There is one school district, the Franklin County School District.

It is in the district of Copiah–Lincoln Community College, and has been since 1948.

== See also ==
- Dry counties
- National Register of Historic Places listings in Franklin County, Mississippi
