= Mississippi Cold Case =

2007 documentary film directed by David Ridgen

- Written by: David Ridgen
- Directed by: David Ridgen
- Theme music composer: Johnny Cash; The Reverend Peyton's Big Damn Band; Elmo Williams and Hezekiah Early
- Country of origin: Canada
- Original language: English

Production
- Producer: David Ridgen
- Running time: 42 minutes

Original release
- Network: CBC
- Release: February 11, 2007

Mississippi Cold Case is a 2007 feature documentary produced by David Ridgen of the Canadian Broadcasting Corporation about the Ku Klux Klan murders of two 19-year-old black men, Henry Hezekiah Dee and Charles Eddie Moore, in Southwest Mississippi in May 1964 during the Civil Rights Movement and Freedom Summer. It also explores the 21st-century quest for justice by the brother of Moore. The documentary won numerous awards as a documentary and for its investigative journalism.

As a result of the documentary and related investigations, state and federal officials re-opened the case, prosecuting James Ford Seale of Franklin County for the kidnappings and deaths. He was convicted in 2007 in federal court and sentenced to three life terms. Families of Dee and Moore filed a civil suit in 2008 for damages against Franklin County, Mississippi, charging that its law enforcement officials had been complicit in these events. The county settled the suit with the plaintiffs in 2010 for an undisclosed amount.

== Moore and Dee murders ==
There were rumors circulating amongst members of the KKK that black Muslims were preparing for "insurrection" by bringing guns into Franklin County.

On May 2, 1964, Charles Eddie Moore, a college student, and Henry Hezekiah Dee, a millworker, both 19 and from Franklin County, Mississippi, were picked up by KKK members while they were hitchhiking in Meadville. Klan members, including James Ford Seale, beat them with beanpoles until they were unconscious, repeatedly asking the pair to identify who was behind the county's "Negro trouble". Moore and Dee were unconscious but still breathing when the Klansmen dumped their bodies in the Mississippi River.

They were locked in a trunk of a car, driven across state lines, chained to a Jeep motor block and train rails, and dropped alive into the Mississippi River to die. Edwards later confessed to the FBI that he and Seale had kidnapped and beaten two young black men.

Moore and Dee's mangled torsos were discovered on July 12 and 13, 1964, during the frantic FBI search for James Chaney, Andrew Goodman, and Michael Schwerner, the three civil rights workers who disappeared on June 21, 1964. When it was discovered that the bodies were those of two black men and not those of the civil rights workers, two of whom were white, media interest evaporated and the press moved on. While the FBI investigated the case and arrested two suspects in November 1964, the district attorney concluded that there was insufficient evidence for prosecution. The two suspects that were arrested for the murder case of Moore and Dee were James Ford Seale, 29, and Charles Marcus Edwards, 31. In the days after their arrest, Edwards admitted to the kidnapping and assault of the two men, yet would not admit to the murder of them. After their arrest, the FBI became overwhelmed with the case of the three civil rights workers, so Moore and Dee's case was turned over to local authorities. The case was dropped by local authorities, some of whom were complicit in the crime, according to FBI and HUAC documents. It was not until 2000 that the federal authorities re-opened the murder investigation and discovered documents to help assist in the conviction of Edwards and Seale.

== Documentary ==
In June and July 2004, while preparing to shoot another documentary in Mississippi, Ridgen stumbled across a sequence that troubled him in a 1964, 16 mm film produced in Mississippi by the Canadian Broadcasting Corporation. As the sequence in the film Summer in Mississippi showed a body being taken from a river, he was struck by the narrative:

It was the wrong body. The finding of a negro male was noted and forgotten. The search was not for him. The search was for two white youths and their negro friend.

The documentary film Ridgen was viewing in the CBC archive was called Summer in Mississippi (1964), it was about the murders of James Chaney, Andrew Goodman, and Mickey Schwerner, the three civil rights workers killed by Klansmen in a case that would become known by its FBI codename, "Mississippi Burning". Ridgen immediately wondered why the other body was "forgotten," and how it was determined that this person was "the wrong body".

Looking into the story more deeply, Ridgen discovered the identity of the body: 19-year-old Charles Eddie Moore, an African-American youth. According to articles Ridgen read in The Clarion Ledger newspaper from 1999/2000, Don Whitehead's Attack on Terror (1970), and the Southern Poverty Law Center's online memorial, Moore was killed by Klan members who picked up him and his friend Henry Hezekiah Dee while they were hitchhiking on May 2, 1964. They abducted the two youths and killed them both, dumping them in the river. They were found on two successive days in July 1964.

Forty-one years after the murders, weeks before Klan leader Edgar Ray Killen was found guilty of manslaughter in the murders of Chaney, Goodman, and Schwerner, David Ridgen convinced Thomas Moore, older brother of Charles, to return to Mississippi to seek justice for his brother and Henry Dee. Moore had already been investigating the case.

Filmmaker Ridgen and the CBC organized and funded the entire production. Ridgen has documented Moore on trips spanning over 26 months. A short version of the documentary (34 min.) premiered on February 11, 2007, on CBC. A one-hour version aired on MSNBC on June 9, 2007. A full-length feature version of the film has been completed.

== Results of the documentary ==
Moore's quest and the documentary about it caused state officials to re-open their investigation into the case. The case had been re-opened in 2000 by then-US Attorney Brad Pigott, but closed again in June 2003 after Pigott and the USDOJ Civil Rights Division decided not to proceed based on the evidence. It was re-opened in early July 2005 after Moore and Ridgen visited US Attorney Dunn Lampton at his office. Previously, Moore and Ridgen had been told by a prominent Mississippi journalist that James Ford Seale was dead, as had been reported elsewhere in the media.

Shortly after Ridgen and Moore arrived in Mississippi in July 2005, District Attorney Ronnie Harper told them that Seale was alive. They did not believe him. Later that day, Moore's cousin Kenny Byrd told Ridgen and Moore that Seale was still alive. He confirmed it by pointing out Seale's motor home a short distance away.

Through the course of the production of Mississippi Cold Case, Thomas Moore continued to press the murder conspirators and officials over more than 24 months. Additional evidence was discovered, including new documents and important witnesses willing to testify.

== 2007 prosecution ==
The prosecuting US Attorney brought the case before a federal Grand Jury, which voted to indict the alleged kidnapper and killer, James Ford Seale. He was arrested in January 2007. On January 24, 2007, Seale appeared in federal court in Jackson, Mississippi and was charged with two counts of kidnapping, and one count of conspiracy to kidnap two persons. Seale pleaded not guilty and was denied bond on January 29, 2007, by U.S. Magistrate Judge Linda Anderson.

After Edwards admitted to the murders, he was granted immunity to testify against Seale.

Amid many motion hearings from the defense and prosecution, Seale's trial was set for May 30, 2007, in Jackson, Mississippi. Seale was convicted by a majority-white jury on June 14, 2007. On August 24, 2007, James Seale was sentenced to three life sentences for one count of conspiracy to kidnap two persons and two counts of kidnapping, where the victims were not released alive.

On August 5, 2008, Thomas Moore and Thelma Collins, Henry Dee's sister, filed a federal complaint in a Natchez, Mississippi court claiming state complicity in the deaths of Henry Dee and Charles Moore. They were aided by Professor Margaret Burnham and the Civil Rights and Restorative Justice Project (CRRJ) at the Northeastern University School of Law. The suit claims that in Franklin County in 1964, Sheriff Wayne Hutto and his chief deputy, Kirby Shell, conspired with the Klansmen who abducted and killed Dee and Moore. The plaintiffs sought a federal jury trial for civil damages. On June 21, 2010, Franklin County, Mississippi agreed to an undisclosed settlement in the civil suit with the families of Charles Moore and Henry Dee.

== People involved ==
Charles Marcus Edwards is a deacon at a church in Meadville, Mississippi and a self-declared former Klansman. In 1964, Edwards, along with Seale, faced state murder charges for the deaths of Moore and Dee.

In the documentary, Thomas Moore, the brother of the murdered Charles Moore, seeks justice for the unpunished killing of Charles and Henry. Thomas confronted Edwards in Meadville, Mississippi, but at first Edwards didn't want to discuss the murder case. All Edwards said was "I ain't guilty of that." Edwards confessed during FBI questioning, but he was given immunity in exchange for this testimony against James Ford Seale. Edwards would testify in the 2007 trial which saw Seale convicted. In his testimony, Edwards stated that he saw the victims stuffed alive into the trunk of Seale's car and then driven away to a farm. He also stated that Seale attached heavy weights to the two boys and then dumped them alive into the river. Edwards himself would be indicted for aiming a shotgun at the victims while Klan members beat them, but was later given immunity in exchange for his testimony.

During a short recess in the trial, Edwards apologized to the relatives of Moore and Dee and asked them for forgiveness.

== Awards ==
Mississippi Cold Case has won several awards, including Best of Festival, at the prestigious Yorkton Film Festival in Canada. The film also won Best Social Political Documentary, Best Director (David Ridgen), Best Research (David Ridgen), and Best Editor (Michael Hannan) at Yorkton; the Investigative Reporters and Editor's (IRE) Top Medal for Investigative Journalism; the Canadian Association of Journalism Award for Best Investigative Report Open Television; Best Director at the Canadian Geminis; The English Television "Wilderness" Award for Best Documentary produced in 2007 by the CBC; a Bronze Plaque at the Columbus Festival; and a CINE Golden Eagle Award. The film was nominated for a 2008 Emmy Award for Feature Investigative Documentary.

== See also ==
- Civil rights movement in popular culture
