= Meadville, Mississippi =

- Town
- Location of Meadville, Mississippi

- Location in the United States
- Coordinates: 31°28′23″N 90°53′27″W
- Country: United States
- State: Mississippi
- County: Franklin

Area
  - Total: 1.13 sq mi (2.93 km^{2})
  - Land: 1.13 sq mi (2.93 km^{2})
  - Water: 0 sq mi (0.00 km^{2})
- Elevation: 305 ft (93 m)

Population (2020)
  - Total: 448
  - Density: 396.6/sq mi (153.12/km^{2})
- Time zone: UTC-6 (Central (CST))
  - Summer (DST): UTC-5 (CDT)
- ZIP code: 39653
- Area code: 601
- FIPS code: 28-46200
- GNIS feature ID: 0693939
- Website: www.meadvillems.gov

Meadville is a town in and the county seat of Franklin County, Mississippi, United States, in the southwest part of the state. As of the 2020 census, Meadville had a population of 448. It is situated north of the Homochitto River, which runs from the northeast to the southwest through the county on its way to its outlet at the Mississippi River.

It is home to a chess center, covered in 60 Minutes story aired March 26, 2017, involving chess coach Jeff Bulington.

== History ==
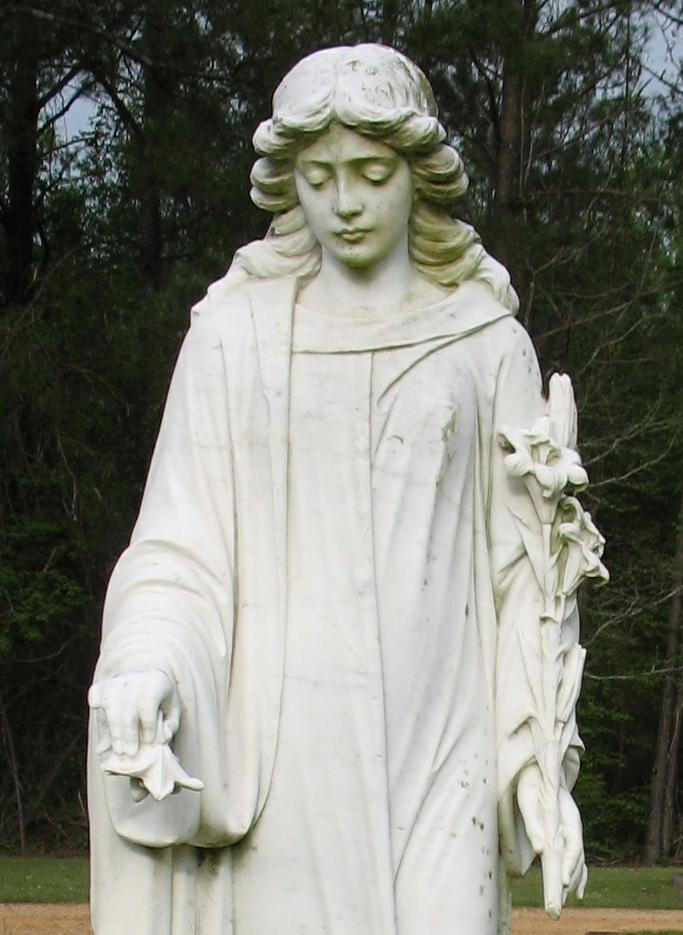
Monument in Midway Cemetery

The town was named after Cowles Mead, a 19th-century political leader. This town developed as a trading center for the agricultural county, which had an early economy based on the cultivation of cotton. Court days also attracted farmers and their customers. The county is still largely rural.

== Geography ==
Meadville is located in the center of Franklin County at 31°28′23″N 90°53′27″W (31.472998, -90.890856). U.S. Routes 98 and 84 bypass the town to the south. U.S. 84 leads east 32 miles (51 km) to Brookhaven, and U.S. 98 leads southeast 36 miles (58 km) to McComb. Together the highways lead west 32 miles (51 km) to Natchez.

According to the United States Census Bureau, Meadville has a total area of 1.1 square miles (2.9 km^{2}), all land.

== Demographics ==
The town had its peak of population in 1960. As of the 2020 United States census, there were 448 people, 230 households, and 144 families residing in the town.

Historical population
Census	Pop.	Note	%±
1910	260		—
1920	304		16.9%
1930	341		12.2%
1940	510		49.6%
1950	524		2.7%
1960	611		16.6%
1970	594		−2.8%
1980	575		−3.2%
1990	453		−21.2%
2000	519		14.6%
2010	449		−13.5%
2020	448		−0.2%
U.S. Decennial Census

=== Race and ethnicity ===
Meadville racial composition as of 2020
Race	Num.	Perc.
White (non-Hispanic)	359	80.13%
Black or African American (non-Hispanic)	70	15.63%
Native American	2	0.45%
Other/Mixed	14	3.13%
Hispanic or Latino	3	0.67%

In 2000, the racial makeup of the town was 82.85% White, 15.41% African American, 0.77% Asian, and 0.96% from two or more races. Hispanic or Latino of any race were 0.58% of the population. By 2020, its racial and ethnic makeup was 80.13% non-Hispanic white, 15.63% African American, 0.45% Native American, 3.13% mixed, and 0.67% Hispanic or Latino of any race.

== Education ==
Meadville is served by the Franklin County School District, which includes Franklin County Elementary and a host of day cares and headstarts.

== Notable people ==
- Greg Briggs, former NFL safety
- Leonard Caston, blues pianist and guitarist
- Charles Marcus Edwards, confessed murderer and member of the Ku Klux Klan
- Dick Jones, former Major League Baseball pitcher
- Pat McGehee, former Major League Baseball pitcher
- Carl Weathersby, electric blues guitarist, vocalist, and songwriter
- Pete Young, former Major League Baseball pitcher
