= Homochitto National Forest =

U.S. National Forest in Mississippi

- Location within the United States
- Location: Mississippi, United States
- Nearest city: Brookhaven, Mississippi
- Coordinates: 31°30′11″N 90°59′55″W
- Area: 191,839 acres (776.34 km^{2})
- Established: July 20, 1936
- Governing body: U.S. Forest Service
- Website: National Forests in Mississippi

Homochitto National Forest is a U.S. National Forest in southwestern Mississippi comprising 191,839 acres (776.34 km^{2}). In the mid-1930s, the Civilian Conservation Corps (CCC) began reforestation of the area and developing a system of roadways and recreational areas.

== Geography ==
In descending order of land area the forest is located in parts of:

- Franklin County,
- Amite County,
- Wilkinson County,
- Adams County,
- Jefferson County,
- Lincoln County,
- Copiah County

== Flora and fauna ==
The flora of the Homochitto National Forest consists of about 850 species of vascular plants. The rivers and streams of the forest are rather poor in bivalve diversity, but at least eight species of freshwater mussels are known, with perhaps as many as 11 species possible. Three species of winter stoneflies have been collected from the Homochitto National Forest, including one that was later described as a new species, Allocapnia starki.

== Headquarters ==
The forest is headquartered in Jackson, Mississippi, as are all six National Forests in Mississippi. There are local ranger district offices located in Meadville.

== See also ==
- List of national forests of the United States
