= Hampton House =

Hampton House may refer to:

== Locations in the United States ==
- Historic Hampton House, Brownsville, Miami, Florida
- FitzSimons–Hampton House, Augusta, Georgia, listed on the NRHP in Richmond County, Georgia
- Cora Beck Hampton Schoolhouse and House, Decatur, Georgia, listed on the NRHP in DeKalb County, Georgia
- Dunnan–Hampton House, Paxton, Illinois, listed on the NRHP in Illinois
- Hampton House (Chicago), Illinois
- Hampton Hall (Franklin, Kentucky), listed on the NRHP in Kentucky
- Doerhoefer–Hampton House, Louisville, Kentucky, listed on the NRHP in Louisville's West End
- Jesse Hampton House, Winchester, Kentucky, listed on the NRHP in Clark County, Kentucky
- The Hampton Mansion, on the Hampton National Historic Site, Hampton, Maryland
- Hampton Hall (Woodville, Mississippi), listed on the NRHP in Mississippi
- C.C. Hampton Homestead, Harrisburg, Nebraska, listed on the NRHP in Nebraska
- Hampton House (Arcadia, North Carolina), listed on the NRHP in North Carolina
- Ellis–Hampton House, Pendleton, Oregon, listed on the NRHP in Umatilla County, Oregon
- Wetherby–Hampton–Snyder–Wilson–Erdman Log House, Tredyffrin, Pennsylvania, listed on the NRHP in Pennsylvania
- Caldwell–Hampton–Boylston House, Columbia, South Carolina, listed on the NRHP in South Carolina
- Hampton–Preston House, Columbia, South Carolina, listed on the NRHP in South Carolina
- Hampton Plantation, McClellanville, South Carolina, listed on the NRHP in South Carolina
- E.L. Hampton House, Tracy City, Tennessee, listed on the NRHP in Grundy County, Tennessee

== See also ==
- Hampton Hall (disambiguation)
- Hampton Inn (disambiguation)
