= Hampton Hall =

Hampton Hall may refer to:

- Hampton Hall (Franklin, Kentucky), listed on the NRHP in Simpson County, Kentucky
- Hampton Hall (Woodville, Mississippi), listed on the NRHP in Wilkinson County, Mississippi
- Hampton Old Hall, Cheshire, England
- Hampton Hall, Oxford, Oxfordshire, England
- Hampton Hall, Worthen, Shropshire, England

== See also ==
- Hampton House (disambiguation)
