= Wilkinson County High School =

Wilkinson County High School may refer to:

- Wilkinson County High School, of the Wilkinson County School District (Georgia)
- Wilkinson County High School, of the Wilkinson County School District (Mississippi)
