= Wilkinson County School District =

Wilkinson County School District may refer to:

- Wilkinson County School District (Georgia)
- Wilkinson County School District (Mississippi)
