= Desert Plantation =

Historic house in Mississippi, United States

Coordinates: 31°1′32.8″N 91°28′30.1″W

- U.S. National Register of Historic Places
- Location within Mississippi Location within the United States
- Nearest city: Woodville, Mississippi, U.S.
- Area: 183 acres (74 ha)
- Built: 1825-1835
- Architectural style: Federal
- NRHP reference No.: 87000543
- Added to NRHP: April 1, 1987

The Desert Plantation is a Southern plantation with a historic house located near Woodville, Mississippi in the Tunica Hills.

== History ==
The plantation was established by Robert Semple circa 1808. By 1814, Semple acquired more acres, totalling 1,000 acres. The Pinckneyville Creek flows through the plantation.

The house was built from 1808 to 1812. It was designed in the Federal architectural style. By 1845, Semple added a Greek Revival wing to the original structure.

By 1885, the Semple family sold the plantation to C. H. Norman. Norman in turn sold it to the McGehee and Merwin families, who co-owned an agricultural concern. The house was purchased by D. F. Merwin in 1917, whose family still owned the house by 1987.

== Architectural significance ==
It has been listed on the National Register of Historic Places since April 1, 1987.
