= National Register of Historic Places listings in Wilkinson County, Mississippi =

Location of Wilkinson County in Mississippi

This is a list of the National Register of Historic Places listings in Wilkinson County, Mississippi.

This is intended to be a complete list of the properties and districts on the National Register of Historic Places in Wilkinson County, Mississippi, United States. Latitude and longitude coordinates are provided for many National Register properties and districts; these locations may be seen together in a map.

There are 16 properties and districts listed on the National Register in the county.

This National Park Service list is complete through NPS recent listings posted October 23, 2026.

== Current listings ==
	Name on the Register	Image	Date listed	Location	City or town	Description
1	Anderson Mound	Anderson Mound	May 1, 1986 (#86000921)	Address restricted	Woodville	
2	Arbuthnot's Grocery and House		May 20, 2016 (#16000284)	8990 Pinckneyville Rd. 31°05′47″N 91°26′44″W	Woodville vicinity	
3	Branch Banking House	Branch Banking House	March 30, 1978 (#78001635)	Bank St. 31°06′10″N 91°17′57″W	Woodville	Currently known as the Wilkinson County African-American Museum
4	Centreville Historic District		October 13, 1992 (#92001091)	Roughly bounded by Cherokee, Laurel, and St. Mary Sts. 31°05′12″N 91°04′06″W	Centreville	
5	Desert Plantation		April 1, 1987 (#87000543)	East of Pinckneyville-Woodville Rd. 31°01′37″N 91°28′33″W	Woodville vicinity	
6	Forest Home Plantation		March 19, 1982 (#82003121)	Southwest of Centreville; 31°00′34″N 91°11′53″W	Centreville vicinity	Burned down in 2015
7	Fort Adams Site	Fort Adams Site	January 11, 1974 (#74001067)	South of Fort Adams; 31°04′46″N 91°32′51″W	Fort Adams	
8	Hampton Hall		October 24, 1980 (#80002307)	U.S. Highway 61; 31°05′40″N 91°17′30″W	Woodville	
9	Holly Grove		October 21, 1988 (#88002037)	Mississippi Highway 33, 4 miles south of Mississippi Highway 24; 31°02′23″N 91°06′09″W	Centreville vicinity	
10	Office and Banking House of West Feliciana Railroad		1977-10-28ros (#77000798)	Depot St. 31°06′10″N 91°17′54″W	Woodville	
11	Pleasant Hill		November 17, 1982 (#82000582)	East of Woodville on Mississippi Highway 24; 31°05′27″N 91°15′35″W	Woodville vicinity	
12	Rosemont	Rosemont	December 30, 1974 (#74001068)	East of Woodville on Mississippi Highway 24; 31°06′02″N 91°16′31″W	Woodville vicinity	Also known as Poplar Grove or the Hale House
13	Salisbury Plantation		June 16, 1983 (#83000970)	Off Woodville Rd. 31°03′28″N 91°26′39″W	Woodville vicinity	
14	Smith Creek Site	Smith Creek Site	June 13, 1978 (#78001634)	Address restricted	Fort Adams	
15	Tansy Island Hunting Club Camp Site and Clubhouse		March 3, 1995 (#95000179)	Tansy Island Rd., off of Dolosoro Loop; 31°16′02″N 91°23′31″W	Woodville vicinity	
16	Woodville Historic District	Woodville Historic District	September 30, 1982 (#82003122)	Roughly bounded by Prentiss, 2nd, College, Siglo, and Water Sts.; also 546 Depot St. and 559 3rd St.; also roughly along Depot, 1st West, Main, 2nd South, Sligo, 3rd South, and Water Sts.; also roughly bounded by the Old Prentiss Highway, U.S. Route 61, and the city limits 31°06′07″N 91°17′56″W	Woodville	Boundaries after the first semicolon represent boundary increases of October 21, 1993, May 20, 1999, and October 19, 2001

== See also ==
- List of National Historic Landmarks in Mississippi
- National Register of Historic Places listings in Mississippi
