= Loch Leven, Mississippi =

- Ghost town
- Location within Mississippi
- Coordinates: 31°12′32″N 91°34′30″W
- Country: United States
- State: Mississippi
- County: Wilkinson
- Elevation: 52 ft (16 m)
- Time zone: UTC-6 (Central (CST))
  - Summer (DST): UTC-5 (CDT)
- GNIS feature ID: 692009

Loch Leven is a ghost town in Wilkinson County, Mississippi, United States.

== History ==
Loch Leven began as a cotton plantation located directly on the Mississippi River.

The plantation was abandoned early in the Civil War, and its owner, S. Chase, was listed in Union Army records as "absent" but "loyal". By 1864, a lease was granted to renew production of cotton on the property.

In 1866, Loch Leven Plantation was 1,557 acres (630 ha) in size.

In the 1870s, Loch Leven and the plantation at nearby Artonish were owned by J.K. Elgee and Josiah Chambers.

The settlement was noted in both 1872 and 1891 as having a post office.

The Union Church was located west of the settlement, and Loch Leven Cemetery to the east. Both are now extinct.

== Current uses ==
An 8,000-acre (3,200 ha) parcel of private property called the Loch Leven Plantation surrounds the former settlement and is used for "maintenance, control, and preservation". East of the former settlement, the Loch Leven Plantation grows cotton, wheat and corn. Another part of the plantation is leased to hunters. In 2003, a man was accidentally shot and killed while hunting there.
