= Tylan Grable =

American football player (born 1999)

No. 68 – Buffalo Bills
- Position: Offensive tackle
- Roster status: Active

Personal information
- Born: October 4, 1999 (age 27); Gordon, Georgia, U.S.
- Listed height: 6 ft 5 in (1.96 m)
- Listed weight: 313 lb (142 kg)

Career information
- High school: Wilkinson County (Irwinton, Georgia)
- College: Jacksonville State (2018–2021); UCF (2022–2023)
- NFL draft: 2024: 6th round, 204th overall pick

Career history
- Buffalo Bills (2024–present)

Awards and highlights
- Second-team FCS All-American (2020–21); First-team All-OVC (2020–21); Third-team All-AAC (2022)

Career NFL statistics as of 2025
- Games played: 5
- Games started: 2
- Stats at Pro Football Reference

Tylan Grable (born October 4, 1999) is an American professional football offensive tackle for the Buffalo Bills in the National Football League (NFL). He played college football for the Jacksonville State Gamecocks and UCF Knights.

== Early life ==
Grable was born on October 4, 1999, in Gordon, Georgia, and grew up there. He attended Wilkinson County High School where he won four varsity letters as both a football and basketball player. In football, he was a quarterback. He won the starting job as a sophomore and threw for over 5,000 yards in two seasons before missing his senior year due to injury. He was a zero-star recruit with only one offer from Division II school West Alabama. He decided to walk-on to play for the FCS Jacksonville State Gamecocks.

== College career ==
As a true freshman at Jacksonville State in 2018, Grable redshirted while transitioning to tight end. He then began transitioning to the offensive line in 2019 and won a starting role at left tackle in 2020, earning first-team All-Ohio Valley Conference (OVC) and second-team FCS All-America honors. He was a unanimous all-conference selection in 2021.

Grable transferred to the UCF Knights for the 2022 season. He started all 14 games for the team that year and was named third-team All-American Athletic Conference (AAC) by Pro Football Focus. He returned for a final season in 2023 and started 13 games, being named honorable mention all-Big 12. He was invited to the East–West Shrine Bowl and to the NFL Scouting Combine.

== Professional career ==
Pre-draft measurables
Height	Weight	Arm length	Hand span	Wingspan	40-yard dash	10-yard split	20-yard split	Vertical jump	Broad jump
6 ft 5 3/4 in (1.97 m)	306 lb (139 kg)	33 5/8 in (0.85 m)	10 1/8 in (0.26 m)	6 ft 8 5/8 in (2.05 m)	4.95 s	1.69 s	2.84 s	36.5 in (0.93 m)	9 ft 9 in (2.97 m)
All values from NFL Combine

Grable was selected by the Buffalo Bills in the sixth round (204th overall) of the 2024 NFL draft. He made four appearances (one start) for Buffalo during his rookie campaign.

On August 27, 2025, Grable was placed on injured reserve due to lingering concussion symptoms. He was activated on November 29, ahead of Buffalo's Week 13 matchup against the Pittsburgh Steelers.
