= Bud Dupree =

American football player (born 1993)

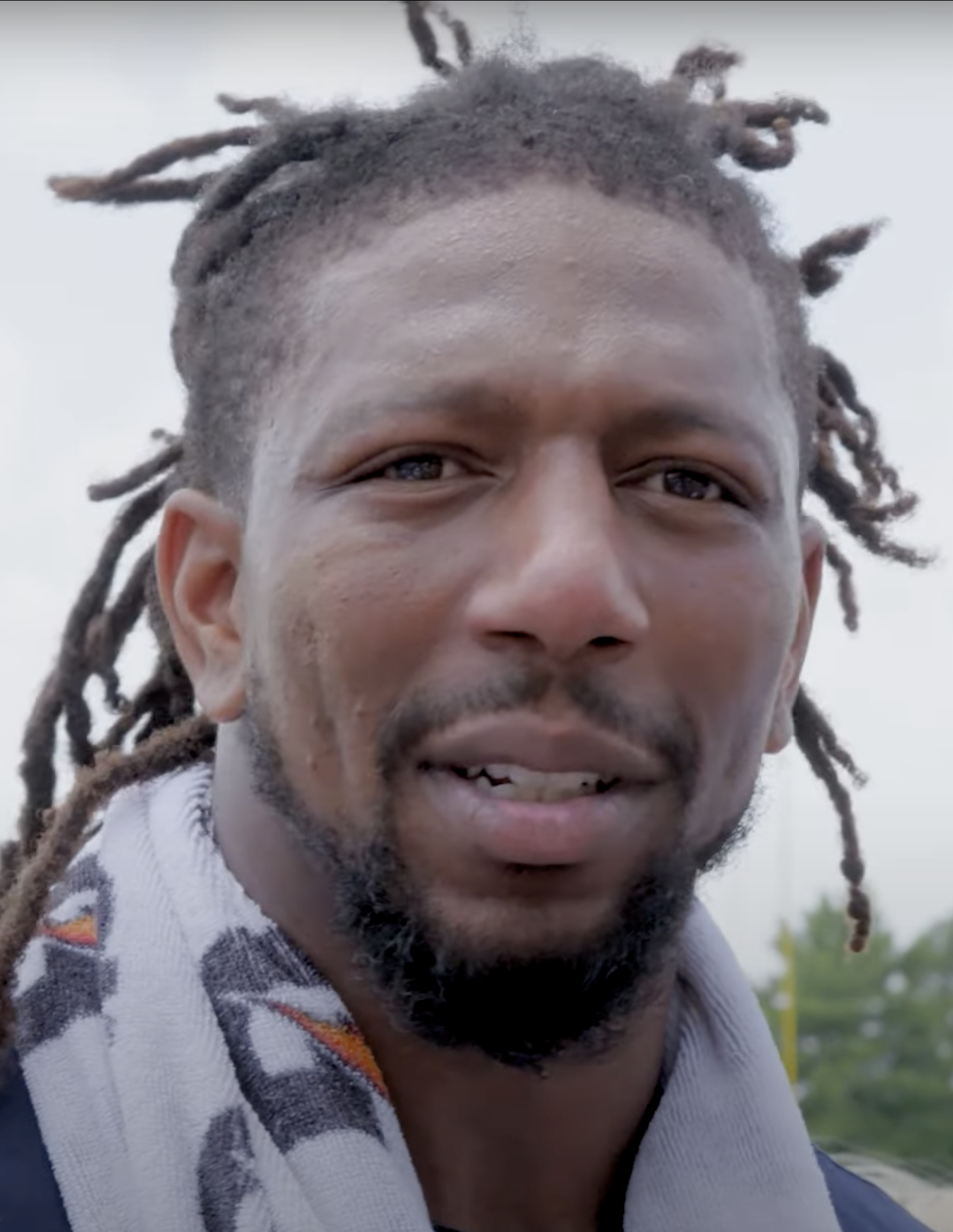
- Dupree in 2022

No. 48 – Los Angeles Chargers
- Position: Outside linebacker
- Roster status: Active

Personal information
- Born: February 12, 1993 (age 33); Macon, Georgia, U.S.
- Listed height: 6 ft 4 in (1.93 m)
- Listed weight: 269 lb (122 kg)

Career information
- High school: Wilkinson County (Irwinton, Georgia)
- College: Kentucky (2011–2014)
- NFL draft: 2015: 1st round, 22nd overall pick

Career history
- Pittsburgh Steelers (2015–2020); Tennessee Titans (2021–2022); Atlanta Falcons (2023); Los Angeles Chargers (2024–present)

Awards and highlights
- First-team All-SEC (2014); Second-team All-SEC (2013)

Career NFL statistics as of Week 5, 2026
- Total tackles: 354
- Sacks: 61.0
- Pass deflections: 18
- Interceptions: 2
- Forced fumbles: 13
- Fumble recoveries: 5
- Defensive touchdowns: 1
- Stats at Pro Football Reference

Alvin "Bud" Dupree Jr. (born February 12, 1993) is an American professional football outside linebacker for the Los Angeles Chargers of the National Football League (NFL). He played college football for the Kentucky Wildcats, and was selected in the first round of the 2015 NFL draft by the Pittsburgh Steelers. He has also played for the Tennessee Titans and Atlanta Falcons.

== Early life ==
Dupree attended Wilkinson County High School in Irwinton, Georgia. He was a three-year starter at defensive end and four-year starter at tight end. As a senior, he had over 1,000 receiving yards and 10 touchdowns on offense and 62 tackles and 10 sacks on defense. He was also voted First-team all state by the Georgia Sports-writer Association and Atlanta Journal-Constitution. Dupree was ranked by Rivals.com as a three-star recruit. He also played basketball for his high school, was on the honor roll, and a member of the Future Business Leaders of America.

== College career ==
As a true freshman at University of Kentucky in 2011, Dupree played in 12 games with three starts at linebacker. During games against Georgia and Vanderbilt, he had a season high five tackles in each game. He finished the season with 21 tackles, 2.5 sacks, and one fumble recovery.

As a sophomore in 2012, Dupree started all 12 regular season games and recorded 91 tackles, 12.5 tackles-for-loss and 6.5 sacks. He recorded a season high 12 tackles against Western Kentucky. For his sophomore season he ranked 10th in the Southeastern Conference (SEC) in tackles and seventh in the FBS for sacks and tackles for loss. After this season he would switch from linebacker to defensive lineman for his last two years at Kentucky.

As a junior, in 2013, he played in 11 games, ranking second on his team with 61 tackles, first on the team with 9.5 tackles-for-loss at defensive end. He also had seven sacks and two forced fumbles. Against Mississippi State, Dupree recorded a career-high 13 tackles. In the SEC he finished sixth in sacks.

Dupree returned as a starter at defensive end his senior season in 2014 and was voted team captain for the Wildcats that year. For the season he had 74 tackles, 12.5 tackles-for-loss, and eight sacks. He also started all 12 games and recorded his first career interception which he returned for a game-winning touchdown in a 45–38 win against South Carolina. On Saturday, May 9, 2015, he graduated from the University of Kentucky with a degree in community and leadership development.

== Professional career ==
=== Pre-draft ===
Coming out of college, Dupree was projected to be a first round draft pick by the majority of NFL analysts. He received an invitation to the NFL Combine and completed the majority of combine drills. Dupree was unable to perform the bench due to a pectoral injury and opted to not run the short shuttle and three-cone drill after suffering a groin injury. On March 12, 2015, he participated at Kentucky's pro day and performed very well in positional drills, the short shuttle, and three cone drills for scouts and teams representatives from 26 NFL teams. Minnesota Vikings head coach Mike Zimmer, Cincinnati Bengals head coach Marvin Lewis, and Pittsburgh Steelers head coach Mike Tomlin attended to scout Dupree, Za'Darius Smith, Braylon Heard, and 15 other prospects. Analysts and scouts gave him positive reviews for his freakish athleticism, explosive burst, large frame, outstanding power and strength, ability to play zone coverage, and character. The only criticisms he received were due to his below-average instincts and lack of consistency. He was also ranked the top defensive end out of the 148 available by NFLDraftScout.com, was ranked the fourth best outside linebacker by Sports Illustrated, the fifth best edge rusher by NFL analyst Charles Davis, and was ranked the second best edge rusher by NFL analyst Mike Mayock.

Pre-draft measurables
Height	Weight	Arm length	Hand span	Wingspan	40-yard dash	10-yard split	20-yard split	20-yard shuttle	Three-cone drill	Vertical jump	Broad jump
6 ft 4 in (1.93 m)	269 lb (122 kg)	32 5/8 in (0.83 m)	9 3/4 in (0.25 m)	6 ft 7 3/8 in (2.02 m)	4.56 s	1.60 s	2.65 s	4.48 s	7.52 s	42.0 in (1.07 m)	11 ft 6 in (3.51 m)
All values from NFL Combine

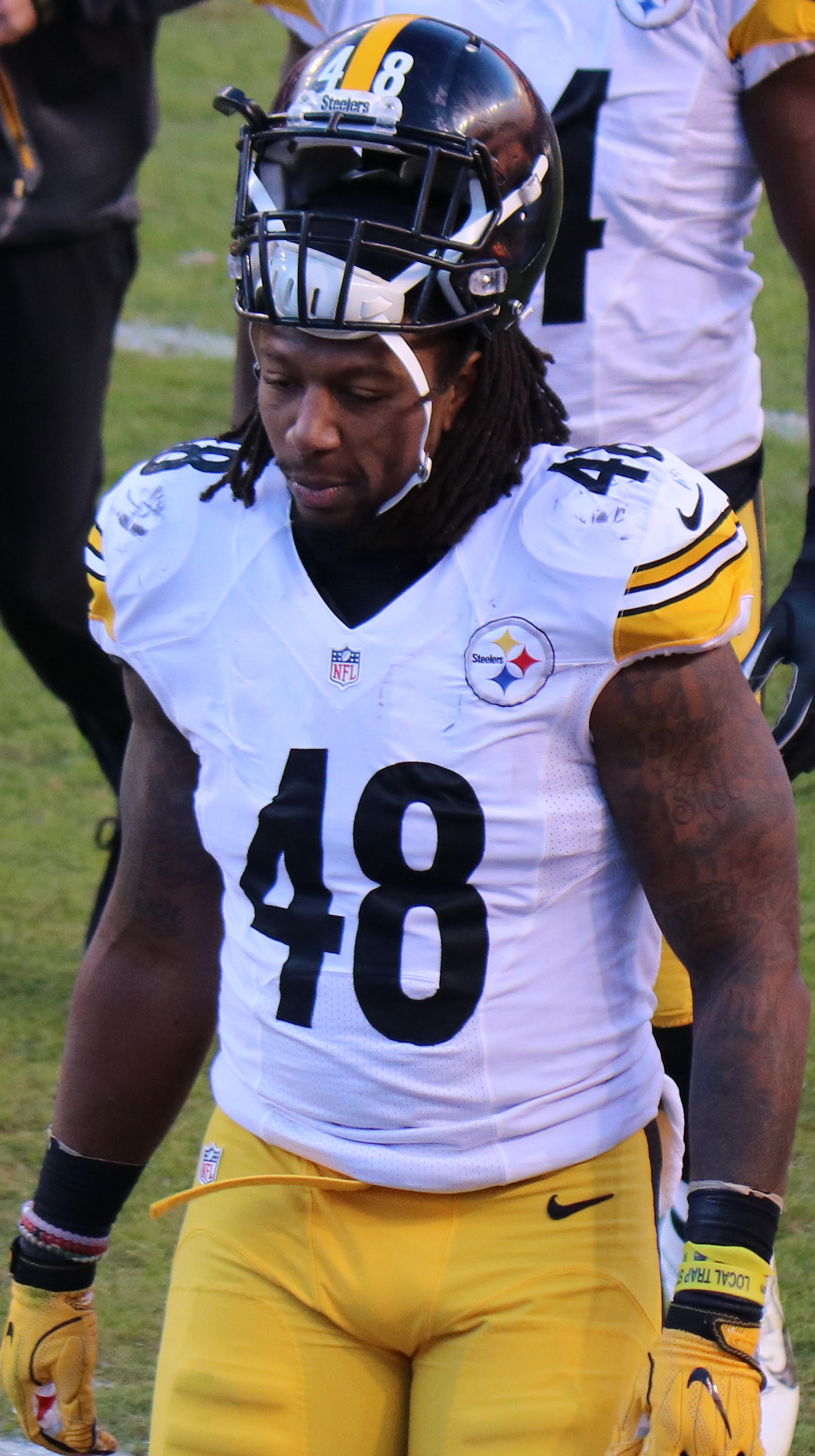
Dupree with the Pittsburgh Steelers in 2016

=== Pittsburgh Steelers ===
==== 2015 ====
The Steelers selected Dupree in the first round (22nd overall) of the 2015 NFL draft. He was the first University of Kentucky player taken in the first round since defensive tackle Dewayne Robertson went, with the fourth overall pick, to the New York Jets in the 2003 NFL draft. He was the second linebacker selected in the draft (behind Vic Beasley, who was selected with the eighth overall pick).

On May 15, 2015, the Steelers signed Dupree to a four-year contract worth $9.22 million with $8.63 million guaranteed and a signing bonus of $4.97 million.

He began his rookie season as the backup left outside linebacker behind veteran Arthur Moats. Dupree made his professional regular season debut in the Steelers' regular-season opener against the New England Patriots and finished the 28–21 loss with two solo tackles and sacked Tom Brady. The next game, he made a season-high four combined tackles and a sack during the Steelers' 43–18 victory over the San Francisco 49ers. On November 29, he made his first career start against the Seattle Seahawks and made one solo tackle. He finished his rookie season with 26 combined tackles, four sacks, and a pass deflection while playing in all 16 regular-season games and five starts.

==== 2016 ====
Dupree was named the starting left outside linebacker ahead of Moats to begin the 2016 regular season. On September 4, 2016, Dupree was placed on injured reserve after suffering a groin injury. He was activated off injured reserve on November 19, 2016, prior to Week 11. He played in his first game of the season the following game. On November 24, 2016, he recorded two solo tackles in a 28–7 victory at the Indianapolis Colts. On December 11, 2016, he made his first start of the season and recorded a career-high five solo tackles, an assisted tackle, and sacked Bills' quarterback Tyrod Taylor 2.5 times during a 27–20 victory over the Buffalo Bills. He finished the 2016 season with 4.5 sacks, 24 total tackles (19 solo), and one pass defended.

==== 2017 ====
Head coach Mike Tomlin named Dupree the left outside linebacker to begin the season, opposite T. J. Watt.

Dupree was unable to play in the season-opener against the Cleveland Browns due to a shoulder injury. In Week 4, Dupree recorded four solo tackles and sacked Joe Flacco, as the Steelers defeated the Baltimore Ravens 26–9. He finished the 2017 season with six sacks, 40 total tackles (31 solo), one pass defended, and one fumble recovery.

==== 2018 ====
On April 23, 2018, the Steelers picked up the fifth-year option on Dupree's contract worth $9.23 million On September 24, Dupree intercepted his first career pass off Ryan Fitzpatrick, and returned it for a touchdown. Dupree finished the 2018 season with 42 tackles, 5.5 sacks, three passes defended, and one interception returned for a touchdown. He received an overall grade of 60.5 from Pro Football Focus in 2018, which ranked as the 78th highest grade among all qualifying edge defenders.

==== 2019 ====
In week 4 against the Cincinnati Bengals, Dupree forced a fumble off Andy Dalton in the 27–3 win. In week 9 against the Indianapolis Colts, Dupree recorded two sacks on Brian Hoyer, one of which was a strip sacked that he forced and recovered, in the 26–24 win, earning AFC Defensive Player of the Week honors. In week 12 against the Cincinnati Bengals, Dupree recorded a strip sack on Ryan Finley and recovered the football in the 16–10 win. In the following week's game against the Cleveland Browns, Dupree sacked Baker Mayfield 1.5 times, one of which included another strip sack that was recovered by Cam Heyward, in the 20–13 win. Dupree had a career year in 2019 recording 11.5 sacks, 4 forced fumbles, and 68 combined tackles.

==== 2020 ====
The Steelers placed the franchise tag on Dupree on March 16, 2020. He signed the one-year tender on April 23, 2020. In Week 2 against the Denver Broncos, Dupree recorded his first sack of the season on Drew Lock during the 26–21 win. Dupree's sack forced Lock to fumble the football and it was recovered by the Steelers. In week 12, against the Baltimore Ravens, Dupree tore his ACL and was placed on season-ending injured reserve the following day. He finished the 2020 season with eight sacks, 31 total tackles (23 solo), and two passes defended.

=== Tennessee Titans ===
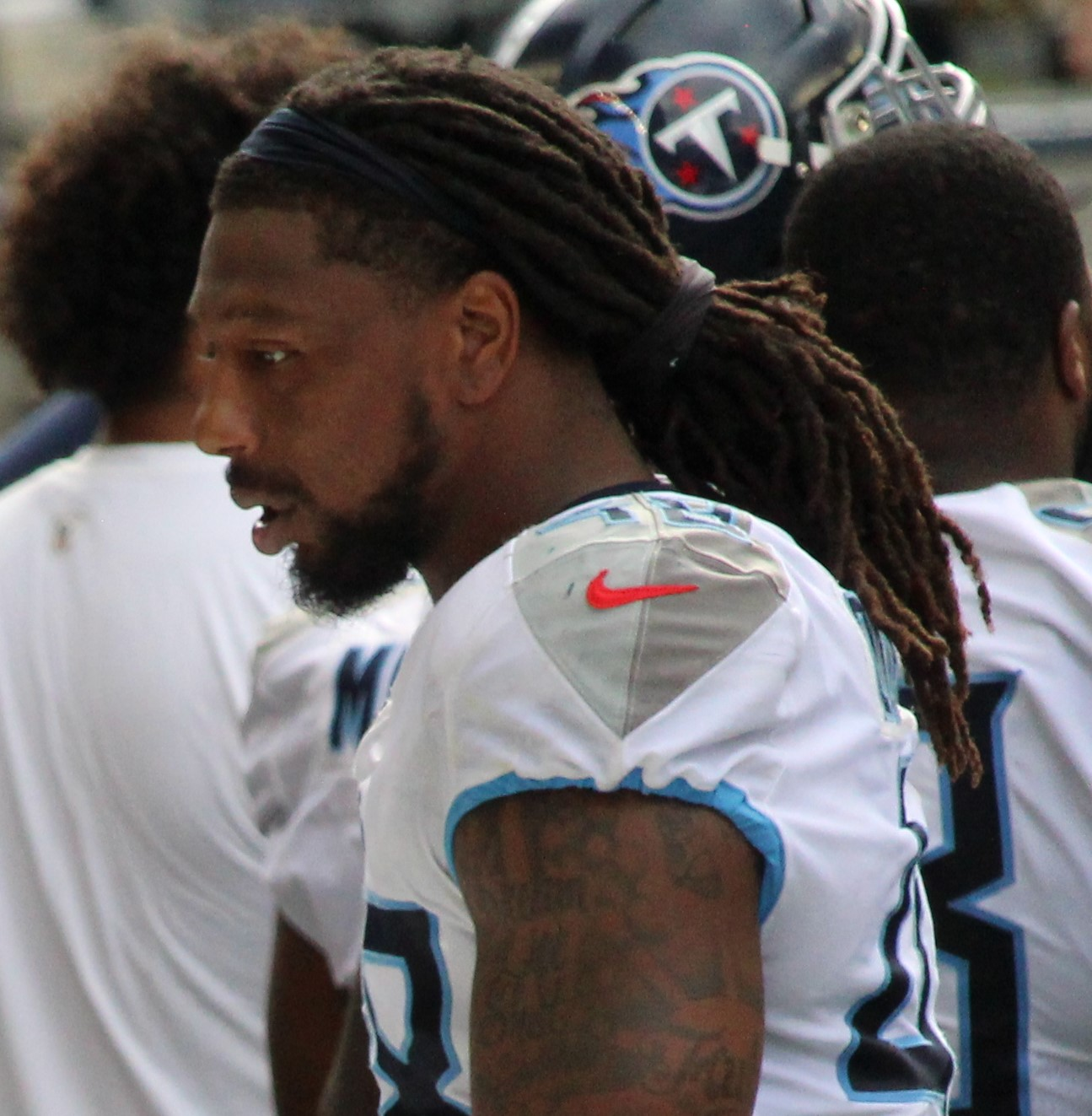
Dupree with the Tennessee Titans in 2021

Dupree signed a five-year, $82.5 million contract with the Tennessee Titans on March 19, 2021. Heading into training camp, Dupree was placed on the physically unable to perform (PUP) list on July 24, 2021. He was activated off the list on August 6, 2021, playing in his first practice the same day. He suffered an abdominal injury in Week 10 and was placed on injured reserve on November 20, 2021. He was activated on December 18. He finished the 2021 season with three sacks, 17 total tackles (13 solo), and one pass defended.

In the 2022 season, Dupree recorded four sacks, 18 total tackles (ten solo), one forced fumble, and two fumble recoveries.

The Titans released Dupree on March 16, 2023.

=== Atlanta Falcons ===
On April 14, 2023, Dupree signed with the Atlanta Falcons. He started 16 games and tied for the team-lead with 6.5 sacks.

=== Los Angeles Chargers ===
On May 11, 2024, Dupree signed a two-year, $6 million contract with the Los Angeles Chargers. He finished the 2024 season with six sacks, 28 total tackles, one interception, and two passes defended.

On June 4, 2025, Dupree signed a one-year, $6 million contract extension with the Chargers. He finished the 2025 season with two sacks, 16 total tackles, and one pass defended.

== NFL career statistics ==
Legend
**Bold**	Career high

=== Regular season ===
Year	Team	Games		Tackles						Interceptions					Fumbles			
Year	Team	GP	GS	Comb	Solo	Ast	Sack	TFL	QBH	Int	Yds	Avg	TD	PD	FF	FR	Yds	TD
2015	PIT	16	5	26	17	9	4.0	4	6	0	0	0.0	0	1	0	0	0	0
2016	PIT	7	4	24	19	5	4.5	6	7	0	0	0.0	0	1	1	0	0	0
2017	PIT	15	15	40	31	9	6.0	12	7	0	0	0.0	0	1	0	1	0	0
2018	PIT	16	15	42	30	12	5.5	8	13	**1**	**10**	**10.0**	**1**	**3**	1	0	0	0
2019	PIT	16	16	**68**	**49**	19	**11.5**	**16**	**17**	0	0	0.0	0	**3**	**4**	**2**	0	0
2020	PIT	11	11	31	23	8	8.0	8	15	0	0	0.0	0	2	2	0	0	0
2021	TEN	11	6	17	13	4	3.0	2	8	0	0	0.0	0	1	1	0	0	0
2022	TEN	11	11	18	14	4	4.0	6	9	0	0	0.0	0	0	1	**2**	**2**	0
2023	ATL	16	16	39	17	**22**	6.5	8	8	0	0	0.0	0	**3**	2	0	0	0
2024	LAC	17	0	28	18	10	6.0	6	10	**1**	0	0.0	0	2	1	0	0	0
2025	LAC	16	5	16	9	7	2.0	2	3	0	0	0.0	0	1	0	0	0	0
Career		152	104	349	240	109	61.0	78	103	2	10	5.0	1	18	13	5	2	0

=== Postseason ===
Year	Team	Games		Tackles						Interceptions					Fumbles			
Year	Team	GP	GS	Comb	Solo	Ast	Sack	TFL	QBH	Int	Yds	Avg	TD	PD	FF	FR	Yds	TD
2015	PIT	2	2	6	4	2	0.0	**2**	0	0	0	0.0	0	0	0	0	0	0
2016	PIT	3	3	**15**	**10**	**5**	0.5	1	**3**	0	0	0.0	0	**1**	0	0	0	0
2017	PIT	1	1	4	3	1	0.0	0	0	0	0	0.0	0	0	0	0	0	0
2021	TEN	1	0	2	2	0	**1.0**	1	1	0	0	0.0	0	0	0	0	0	0
2024	LAC	1	0	0	0	0	0.0	0	0	0	0	0.0	0	0	0	0	0	0
Career		8	6	27	19	8	1.5	4	4	0	0	0.0	0	1	0	0	0	0

== Personal life ==
Dupree was raised in Toomsboro, Georgia. His father is Alvin Dupree Sr. and his mother is Sophia Stephens. He is also an avid dog lover. The nickname "Bud" was given to him by his godmother. She said while his mother was pregnant with him she had a dream of people calling him Bud and him playing football.

In the early hours of February 18, 2022, Dupree turned himself in to police after being cited for misdemeanor battery charges for an attack against an employee at a Nashville Walgreens after a game against the Miami Dolphins. Before fleeing the scene, Dupree grabbed the employee and later tried to take his phone. Allegedly, Dupree had been "heckled and threatened" before the incident occurred. A court hearing was scheduled for a later date.
