= Artonish, Mississippi =

Artonish
- Ghost town
- Location of Artonish in Mississippi
- Coordinates: 31°11′24″N 91°35′01″W
- Country: United States
- State: Mississippi
- County: Wilkinson
- Elevation: 52 ft (16 m)
- Time zone: UTC-6 (Central (CST))
  - Summer (DST): UTC-5 (CDT)
- GNIS feature ID: 691669

Artonish is a ghost town located in Wilkinson County, Mississippi, United States. South of the town was Artonish Landing, located on a stretch of the Mississippi River known as the "Homochitto Cutoff".

Located near the community were the Artonish School, Artonish Plantation, and Artonish Oil Field. Artonish had a post office from 1890 to 1936.

The population was 51 in 1900.

General Walter Henry Gordon, namesake of the vessel USS General W. H. Gordon, was born in Artonish in 1863.

Nothing remains of the settlement.
