= Hampton Inn (disambiguation) =

Hampton Inn is a hotel brand owned by Hilton Worldwide.

Hampton Inn may also refer to:

- Hampton Inn (New Canaan, Connecticut), listed on the National Register of Historic Places (NRHP) in Connecticut

== See also ==
- High Hampton Inn Historic District, NRHP-listed in Cashiers, North Carolina
