= Wilkinson County, Mississippi =

County in the United States

- County
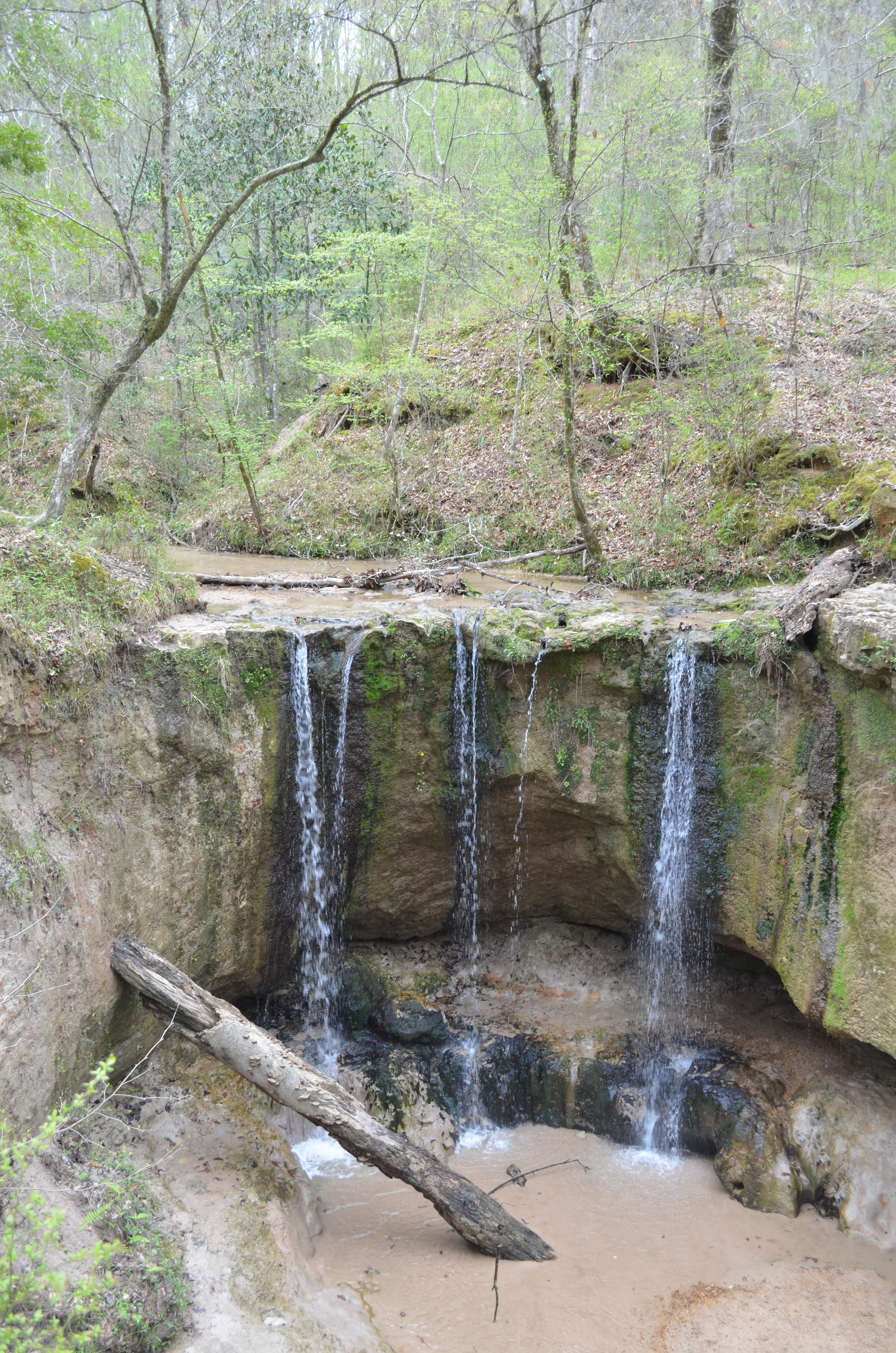
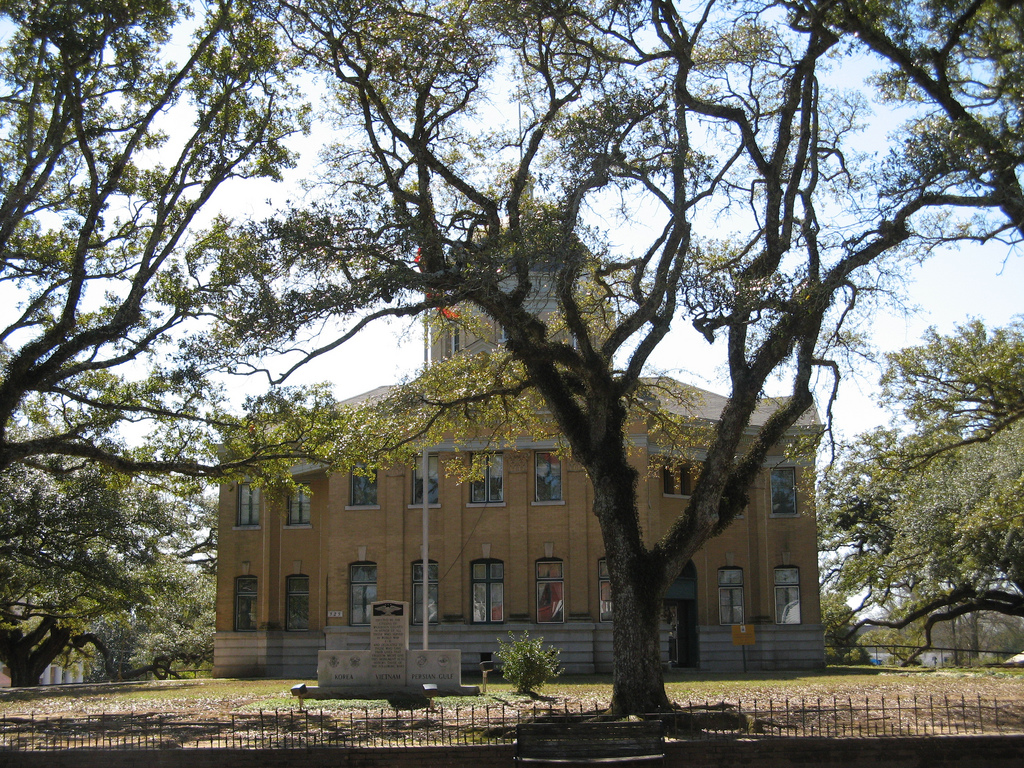
- Left to right: Clark Creek and Wilkinson County Courthouse

- Location within the U.S. state of Mississippi
- Coordinates: 31°10′N 91°19′W
- Country: United States
- State: Mississippi
- Founded: 1802
- Named for: James Wilkinson
- Seat: Woodville
- Largest town: Centreville

Area
  - Total: 688 sq mi (1,780 km^{2})
  - Land: 678 sq mi (1,760 km^{2})
  - Water: 9.7 sq mi (25 km^{2}) 1.4%

Population (2020)
  - Total: 8,587
  - Estimate (2025): 7,582 ▼
  - Density: 12.7/sq mi (4.89/km^{2})
- Time zone: UTC−6 (Central)
  - Summer (DST): UTC−5 (CDT)
- Congressional district: 2nd
- Website: www.wilkinson.co.ms.gov

Wilkinson County is a county located in the southwest corner of the U.S. state of Mississippi. As of 2020, its population was 8,587. Its county seat is Woodville. Bordered by the Mississippi River on the west, the county is named for James Wilkinson, a Revolutionary War military leader and first governor of the Louisiana Territory after its acquisition by the United States in 1803.

== History ==
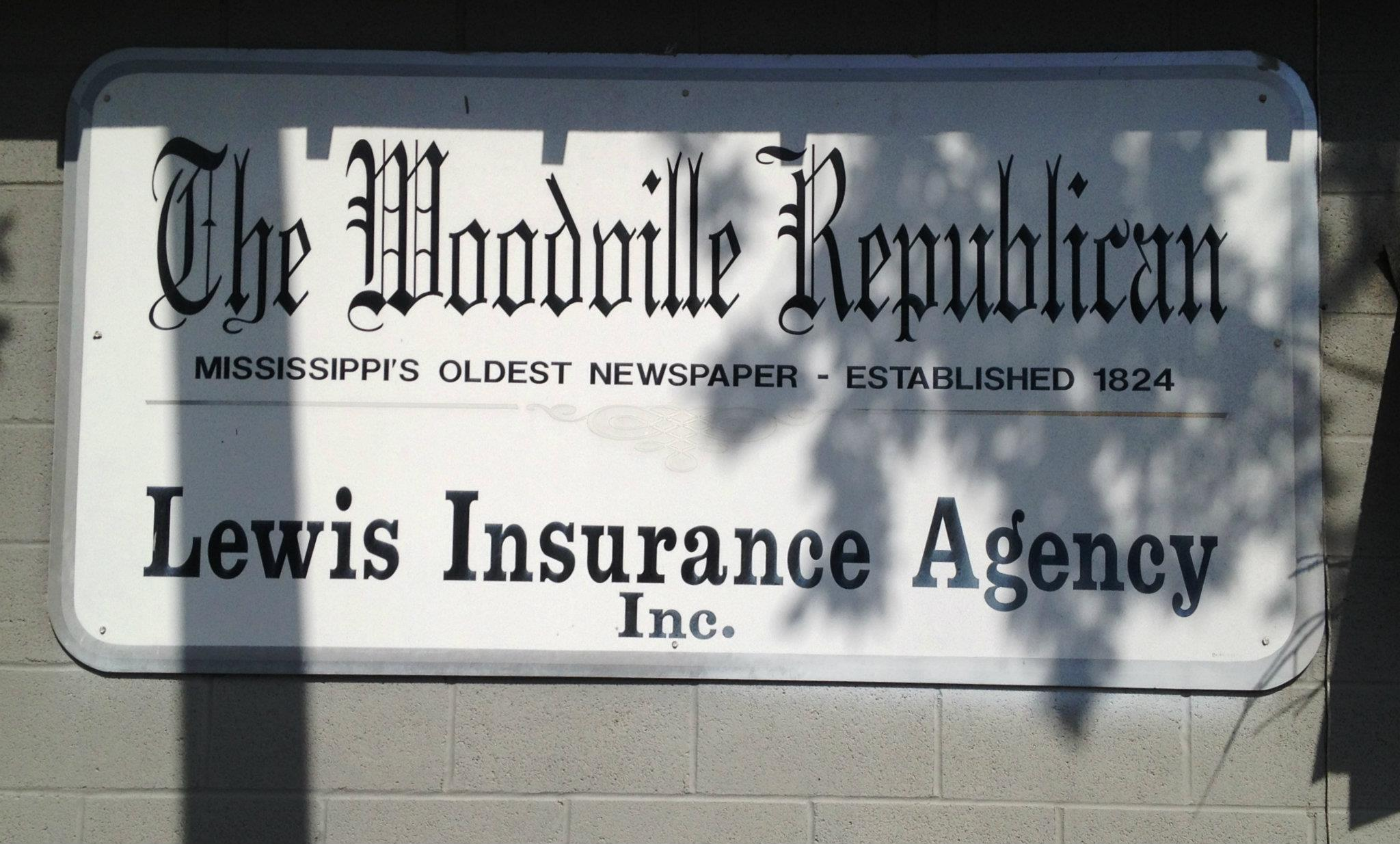
Wilkinson County's Woodville Republican, begun in 1823, is (as of 2012) the oldest newspaper and the oldest business in continuous operation in Mississippi. The sign, facing Depot Street, is on the exterior west wall of the newspaper offices in Woodville.

After Indian Removal in the 19th century, European-American settlers rapidly developed cotton plantations along the Mississippi River, which forms the western border. The intensive cultivation depended on the labor of numerous enslaved African Americans; in the early 19th century, more than a million slaves were relocated to the Deep South from the Upper South in a major forced migration. The population of this county quickly became majority black as enslaved workers were brought in to develop plantations. Much of the bottomlands and interior were undeveloped frontier until after the American Civil War.

The West Feliciana Railroad was later built to help get the cotton commodity crop to market. Some planters got wealthy during the antebellum years and built fine mansions in the county seat of Woodville, Mississippi. Jane and Samuel Emory Davis moved here in 1812 with their several children, and lived at a plantation near Woodville. Their youngest son, Jefferson Davis, attended the Wilkinson Academy in Woodville for two years before going to Kentucky to another school.

After the Civil War, freedmen and planters negotiated new working arrangements. Sharecropping became widespread. Although cotton continued as the commodity crop, a long agricultural depression kept prices low.

Following Reconstruction, white violence against blacks increased through the later decades of the 19th century and into the early 20th century. According to 2017 data compiled in Lynching in America (2015-2017), some nine lynchings of African Americans were recorded in Wilkinson County.

The peak of population in the county was reached in 1900, after which many blacks left in the Great Migration to the North and Midwest. The county has continued to have a black majority population.

In the early 20th century the boll weevil infestation destroyed much of the cotton crops, and mechanization caused a further loss of agricultural jobs. The exit of many African Americans from the state did not change the state's exclusion of African Americans from politics. They were not enabled to vote until after passage of the federal Voting Rights Act in 1965 and its enforcement. Cotton cultivation was revived, but it is produced on a highly mechanized, industrial scale.

Southwest Mississippi was an area of continuing white violence against blacks during the Civil Rights Movement. In February 1964, the White Knights of the Ku Klux Klan officially formed. Clifton Walker, 37, a married father of five and employee of International Paper Company in Natchez, who was not politically active, was killed in an ambush on Poor House Road near his home. The evidence showed there had been a crowd of shooters on both sides of the road. This lynching cold case has never been solved, although it was among numerous ones that the FBI was investigating since 2007, before the Donald Trump administration ended the effort in 2018.

Timber has been harvested and processed in the county as a new commodity crop. The population of the rural county has continued to decline because of lack of jobs. It is still majority African American. Towns have started to develop heritage tourism to attract more visitors.

== Geography ==
According to the U.S. Census Bureau, the county has a total area of 688 square miles (1,780 km^{2}), of which 678 square miles (1,760 km^{2}) is land and 9.7 square miles (25 km^{2}) (1.4%) is water.

=== Major highways ===
- U.S. Highway 61
- Mississippi Highway 24
- Mississippi Highway 33

=== Adjacent counties ===
- Adams County (north)
- Franklin County (northeast)
- Amite County (east)
- East Feliciana Parish, Louisiana (southeast)
- West Feliciana Parish, Louisiana (south)
- Concordia Parish, Louisiana (west)

=== National protected area ===
- Homochitto National Forest (part)

=== State protected area ===
- Clark Creek Natural Area

== Demographics ==
Historical population
Census	Pop.	Note	%±
1810	5,068		—
1820	9,718		91.8%
1830	11,686		20.3%
1840	14,193		21.5%
1850	16,914		19.2%
1860	15,933		−5.8%
1870	12,705		−20.3%
1880	17,815		40.2%
1890	17,592		−1.3%
1900	21,453		21.9%
1910	18,075		−15.7%
1920	15,319		−15.2%
1930	13,957		−8.9%
1940	15,955		14.3%
1950	14,116		−11.5%
1960	13,235		−6.2%
1970	11,099		−16.1%
1980	10,021		−9.7%
1990	9,678		−3.4%
2000	10,312		6.6%
2010	9,878		−4.2%
2020	8,587		−13.1%
2025 (est.)	7,582	▼	−11.7%
U.S. Decennial Census; 1790-1960 1900-1990; 1990-2000 2010-2013

=== 2020 census ===
Wilkinson County, Mississippi – Racial and ethnic composition Note: the US Census treats Hispanic/Latino as an ethnic category. This table excludes Latinos from the racial categories and assigns them to a separate category. Hispanics/Latinos may be of any race.
Race / Ethnicity (NH = Non-Hispanic)	Pop 1980	Pop 1990	Pop 2000	Pop 2010	Pop 2020	% 1980	% 1990	% 2000	% 2010	% 2020
White alone (NH)	3,255	3,103	3,202	2,820	2,525	32.48%	32.06%	31.05%	28.55%	29.40%
Black or African American alone (NH)	6,598	6,511	7,015	6,969	5,764	65.84%	67.28%	68.03%	70.55%	67.12%
Native American or Alaska Native alone (NH)	11	15	10	12	16	0.11%	0.15%	0.10%	0.12%	0.19%
Asian alone (NH)	4	2	2	1	8	0.04%	0.02%	0.02%	0.01%	0.09%
Native Hawaiian or Pacific Islander alone (NH)	x	x	0	0	0	x	x	0.00%	0.00%	0.00%
Other race alone (NH)	2	2	0	4	13	0.02%	0.02%	0.00%	0.04%	0.15%
Mixed race or Multiracial (NH)	x	x	38	31	191	x	x	0.37%	0.31%	2.22%
Hispanic or Latino (any race)	151	45	45	41	70	1.51%	0.46%	0.44%	0.42%	0.82%
Total	10,021	9,678	10,312	9,878	8,587	100.00%	100.00%	100.00%	100.00%	100.00%

According to the U.S. Census Bureau, Wilkinson County's racial and ethnic makeup was predominantly Black or African American in 2020. The total racial and ethnic composition at the 2020 census was approximately 67.4% Black or African American, 29.5% White, 0.2% American Indian and Alaska Native, 0.2% Asian, less than 0.1% Native Hawaiian and Pacific Islander, 0.2% some other race, and 2.6% two or more races. Hispanic or Latino residents of any race comprised 0.8% of the population.

=== 2020 census ===
As of the 2020 census, the county had a population of 8,587. The median age was 41.3 years. 19.9% of residents were under the age of 18 and 19.1% of residents were 65 years of age or older. For every 100 females there were 115.2 males, and for every 100 females age 18 and over there were 116.7 males age 18 and over.

The racial makeup of the county was 29.5% White, 67.4% Black or African American, 0.2% American Indian and Alaska Native, 0.2% Asian, <0.1% Native Hawaiian and Pacific Islander, 0.2% from some other race, and 2.6% from two or more races. Hispanic or Latino residents of any race comprised 0.8% of the population.

<0.1% of residents lived in urban areas, while 100.0% lived in rural areas.

There were 3,313 households in the county, of which 28.0% had children under the age of 18 living in them. Of all households, 30.8% were married-couple households, 24.1% were households with a male householder and no spouse or partner present, and 40.5% were households with a female householder and no spouse or partner present. About 37.9% of all households were made up of individuals and 17.0% had someone living alone who was 65 years of age or older.

There were 4,554 housing units, of which 27.3% were vacant. Among occupied housing units, 76.8% were owner-occupied and 23.2% were renter-occupied. The homeowner vacancy rate was 1.2% and the rental vacancy rate was 10.5%.

=== Income ===
In 2010, the American Community Survey estimated the county had a median household income of $28,066. At the 2020 American Community Survey, its median household income increased to $30,760; the median monthly housing costs were $419. In 2020, the county had a mean income of $46,538, and married-couple families had a median income of $50,227 while non-family households averaged $27,468.

== Education ==
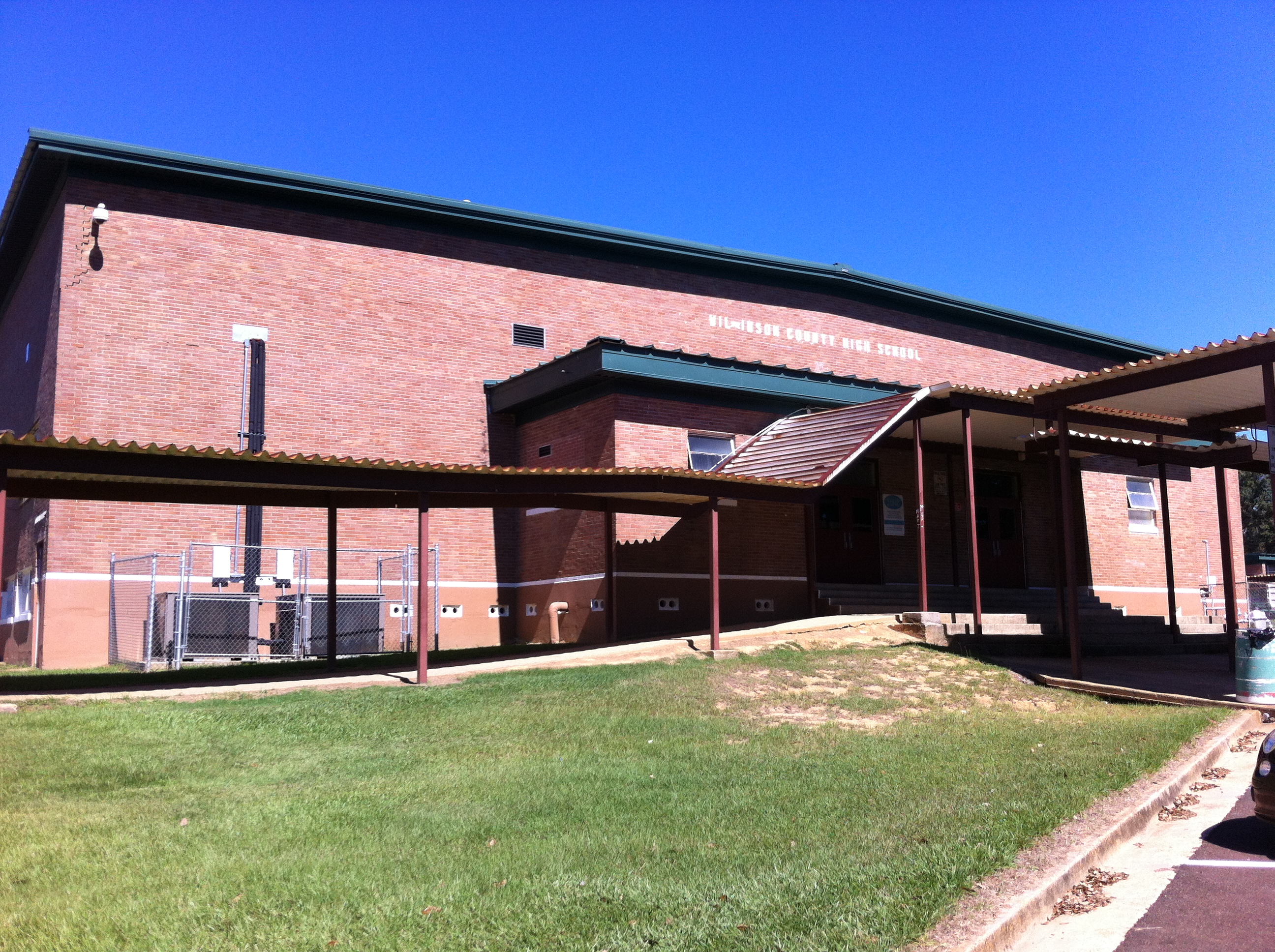
Wilkinson County High School

Wilkinson County School District serves the county. Prior to 1970, when a federal court ruling forced the schools to integrate, the county maintained a separate and highly inferior educational system for Black students. When the schools were finally integrated, all but two white students initially chose to attend Wilkinson County Christian Academy, which was established in 1969 as a segregation academy, or other private schools rather than attend school with Black students. Barnard Waites, the superintendent of the public school system sent his own child to Wilkinson County Christian Academy, and harshly criticized the white parents who exposed their children to the "all negro environment" of Wilkinson County Training School.

Wilkinson County is in the district of Southwest Mississippi Community College.

== Communities ==
=== Towns ===
- Centreville (partly in Amite County)
- Crosby (partly in Amite County)
- Woodville (county seat)

=== Unincorporated communities ===
- Doloroso
- Fort Adams
- Pinckneyville
- Possum Corner
- Rosetta
- Wilkinson

=== Ghost towns ===
- Artonish
- Clarksville
- Loch Leven

== Notable people ==
- Regina Barrow (born 1966), Louisiana state senator from Baton Rouge, Louisiana, since 2016; former state representative from 2005 to 2016; native of Wilkinson County
- Jefferson Davis, President of the Confederate States of America; grew up at Rosemont plantation just east of Woodville
- Anne Moody (1940-2015), civil rights activist and author
- Edward Grady Partin (1924–1990), Teamsters Union business agent in Baton Rouge, native of Woodville
- William Grant Still, African-American classical composer and Mississippi Musicians Hall of Fame inductee was born in Woodville in 1895

== Politics ==
Wilkinson County has been a Democratic stronghold for decades. It has not voted for a Republican presidential candidate since the 1972 national landslide election, and since then no Republican has managed to get even 40% of the county's vote.

United States presidential election results for Wilkinson County, Mississippi
Year	Republican		Democratic		Third party(ies)	
Year	No.	%	No.	%	No.	%
1912	8	1.92%	379	90.89%	30	7.19%
1916	8	1.69%	460	97.46%	4	0.85%
1920	15	3.46%	416	96.07%	2	0.46%
1924	40	10.13%	355	89.87%	0	0.00%
1928	73	8.69%	767	91.31%	0	0.00%
1932	18	2.16%	813	97.48%	3	0.36%
1936	21	2.66%	767	97.09%	2	0.25%
1940	46	4.66%	942	95.34%	0	0.00%
1944	80	8.48%	863	91.52%	0	0.00%
1948	21	2.40%	43	4.92%	810	92.68%
1952	699	55.39%	563	44.61%	0	0.00%
1956	240	28.20%	260	30.55%	351	41.25%
1960	174	14.24%	216	17.68%	832	68.09%
1964	1,473	93.46%	103	6.54%	0	0.00%
1968	272	6.94%	2,144	54.71%	1,503	38.35%
1972	1,608	52.65%	1,409	46.14%	37	1.21%
1976	1,273	33.11%	2,514	65.38%	58	1.51%
1980	1,442	32.04%	2,981	66.24%	77	1.71%
1984	1,722	39.28%	2,627	59.92%	35	0.80%
1988	1,528	36.18%	2,678	63.41%	17	0.40%
1992	1,399	28.29%	3,210	64.91%	336	6.79%
1996	1,016	24.77%	2,807	68.43%	279	6.80%
2000	1,423	34.72%	2,551	62.25%	124	3.03%
2004	1,563	35.64%	2,794	63.72%	28	0.64%
2008	1,560	30.36%	3,534	68.77%	45	0.88%
2012	1,415	29.16%	3,412	70.31%	26	0.54%
2016	1,318	31.25%	2,857	67.73%	43	1.02%
2020	1,324	32.08%	2,749	66.61%	54	1.31%
2024	1,075	36.68%	1,817	61.99%	39	1.33%

== See also ==
- National Register of Historic Places listings in Wilkinson County, Mississippi
