= Woodville Republican =

Newspaper in Woodville, Mississippi, US

- Type: Weekly newspaper
- Founder: William A. A. Chisholm
- Editor-in-chief: Andy J. Lewis
- Founded: 1832
- Headquarters: 425 Depot Street, Woodville, MS 39669
- ISSN: 2378-3486
- OCLC number: 16582724

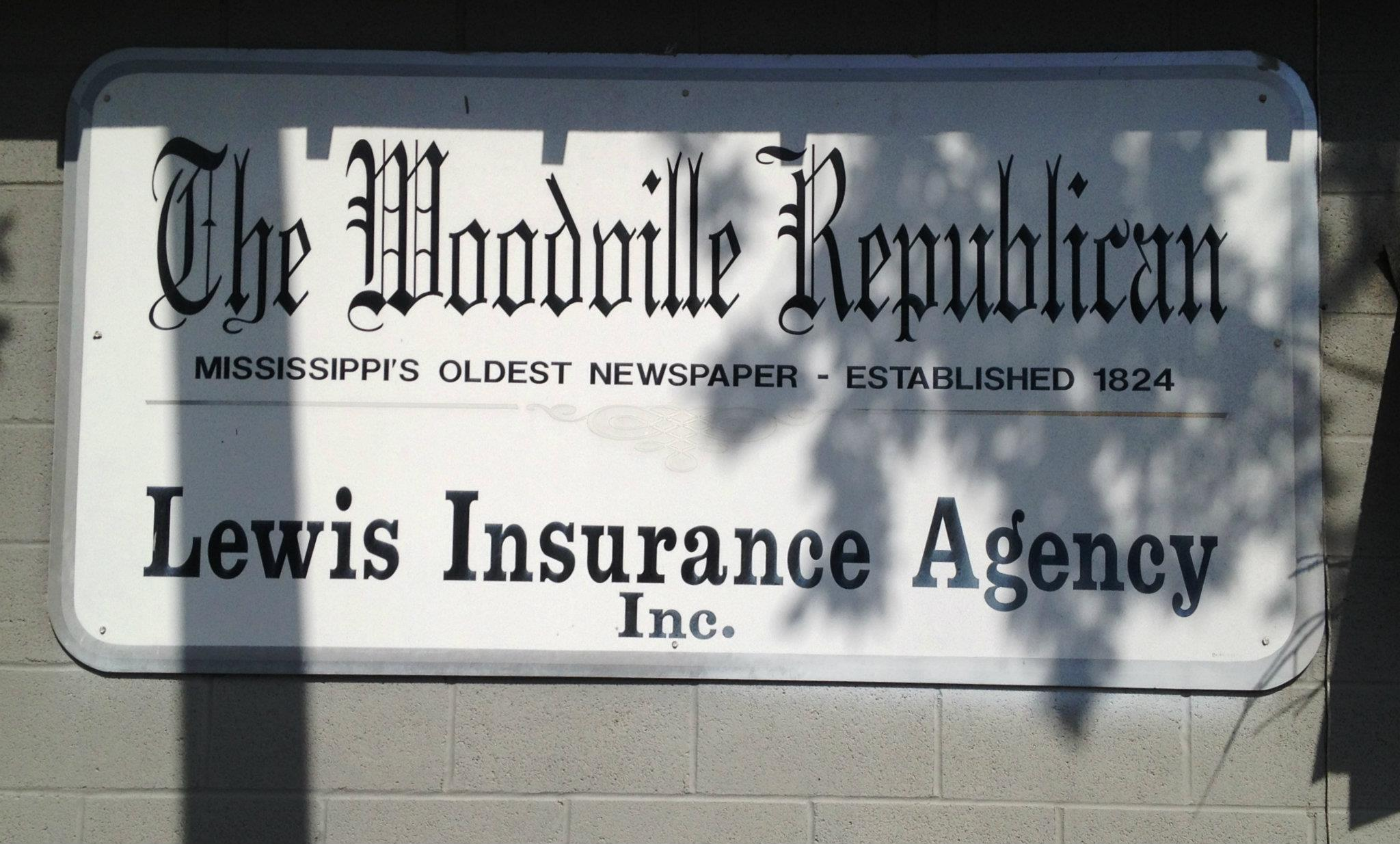
Sign on the west exterior wall (facing Depot Street) of the offices of the Woodville Republican

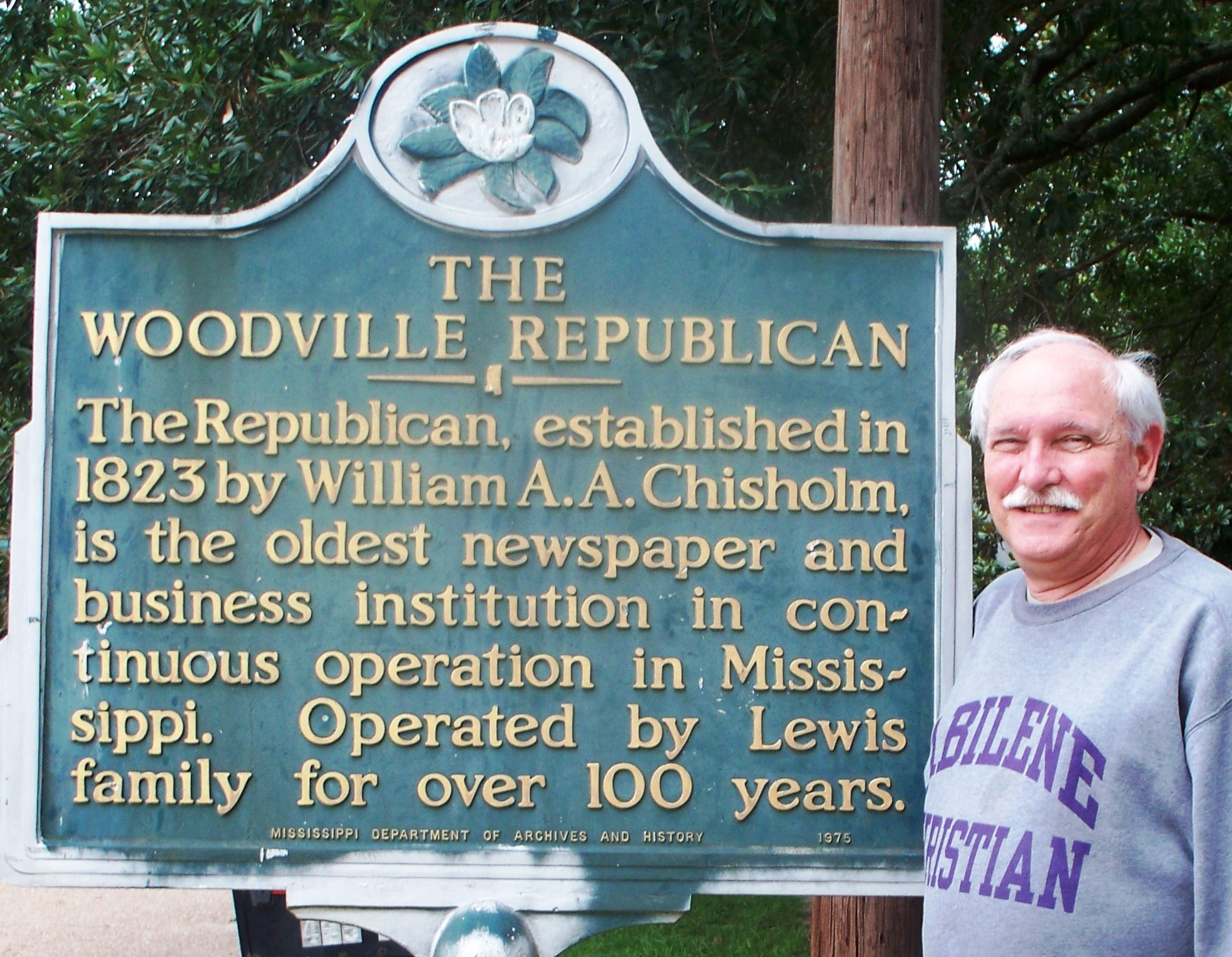
Historical marker in front of the Woodville Republican office on Depot Street

The Woodville Republican is a weekly newspaper published in Woodville, Wilkinson County, Mississippi. It is the oldest newspaper, as well as the oldest business, in continuous incorporated operation in Mississippi.

The Woodville Republican was established in 1823 by William A. A. Chisholm. The name predates, and is unrelated to, the present-day Republican Party.

The Lewis family has owned and operated the Republican since 7 June 1879. As of 2010, the editor is Andy J. Lewis. Issues of the Woodville Republican come out on Wednesdays.
