= Holly Grove (Centreville, Mississippi) =

Historic house in Mississippi, United States

- U.S. National Register of Historic Places
- Location within Mississippi Location within the United States
- Nearest city: Centreville, Mississippi
- Area: 110.8 acres (44.8 ha)
- Built: c. 1820
- Architectural style: Federal
- NRHP reference No.: 88002037
- Added to NRHP: October 21, 1988

Holly Grove is a Southern plantation with a historic house located near Centreville, Mississippi, USA.

== History ==
The plantation was established in 1812 by Duncan Stewart. The two-story mansion, designed in the Federal architectural style, was built prior to Stewart's death in 1820.

== Architectural significance ==
The mansion has been listed on the National Register of Historic Places since October 21, 1988.
