= Rudolph Matthews =

American handball player (born 1945)

Personal information
- Full name: Rudolph "Matt" Matthews
- Nationality: United States
- Born: November 7, 1945 (age 80) Woodville, Mississippi

Sport
- Sport: Handball

Rudolph "Matt" Matthews (born November 7, 1945) is an American former handball player who competed in the 1972 Summer Olympics.

He was born in Woodville, Mississippi.

In 1972, he was part of the American team which finished 14th in the Olympic tournament. He played all five matches and scored ten goals.
