= Irwinton, Georgia =

- City
- Location in Wilkinson County and the state of Georgia
- Coordinates: 32°48′43″N 83°10′36″W
- Country: United States
- State: Georgia
- County: Wilkinson

Government
  - Mayor: Roger Bacon

Area
  - Total: 3.15 sq mi (8.15 km^{2})
  - Land: 3.15 sq mi (8.15 km^{2})
  - Water: 0 sq mi (0.00 km^{2})
- Elevation: 446 ft (136 m)

Population (2020)
  - Total: 531
  - Density: 168.8/sq mi (65.19/km^{2})
- Time zone: UTC-5 (Eastern (EST))
  - Summer (DST): UTC-4 (EDT)
- ZIP code: 31042
- Area code: 478
- FIPS code: 13-41400
- GNIS feature ID: 0315946
- Website: https://www.cityofirwinton.org/

Irwinton is a city in Wilkinson County, Georgia, United States. The population was 531 in 2020. The city is the county seat of Wilkinson County.

== History ==
Irwinton was founded in 1811 as the seat of Wilkinson County. The community was named for Governor Jared Irwin. Irwinton was incorporated as a town in 1816 and as a city in 1904.

== Geography ==
Irwinton is located at 32°48′43″N 83°10′36″W (32.812075, -83.176800). According to the United States Census Bureau, the city has a total area of 3.15 square miles (8.2 km^{2}), all land.

== Demographics ==
Historical population
Census	Pop.	Note	%±
1870	241		—
1880	264		9.5%
1900	227		—
1910	249		9.7%
1920	379		52.2%
1930	561		48.0%
1940	589		5.0%
1950	700		18.8%
1960	673		−3.9%
1970	757		12.5%
1980	841		11.1%
1990	641		−23.8%
2000	587		−8.4%
2010	589		0.3%
2020	531		−9.8%
U.S. Decennial Census

=== Racial and ethnic composition ===
Irwinton city, Georgia – Racial and ethnic composition Note: the US Census treats Hispanic/Latino as an ethnic category. This table excludes Latinos from the racial categories and assigns them to a separate category. Hispanics/Latinos may be of any race.
Race / Ethnicity (NH = Non-Hispanic)	Pop 2000	Pop 2010	Pop 2020	% 2000	% 2010	% 2020
White alone (NH)	247	214	183	42.08%	36.33%	34.46%
Black or African American alone (NH)	335	322	278	57.07%	54.67%	52.35%
Native American or Alaska Native alone (NH)	0	0	7	0.00%	0.00%	1.32%
Asian alone (NH)	0	3	3	0.00%	0.51%	0.56%
Native Hawaiian or Pacific Islander alone (NH)	0	0	0	0.00%	0.00%	0.00%
Other race alone (NH)	0	0	0	0.00%	0.00%	0.00%
Mixed race or Multiracial (NH)	1	2	23	0.17%	0.34%	4.33%
Hispanic or Latino (any race)	4	48	37	0.68%	8.15%	6.97%
Total	587	589	531	100.00%	100.00%	100.00%

=== 2020 census ===
As of the 2020 United States census, there were 531 people, 166 households, and 113 families residing in the city.

== Education ==
=== Wilkinson County School District ===
The Wilkinson County School District holds pre-school to grade twelve, and consists of two elementary schools, a middle school, and a high school. The district has 117 full-time teachers and over 1,737 students.

- Wilkinson County Elementary School
- Wilkinson County Primary School
- Wilkinson County Middle School
- Wilkinson County High School

== Notable people ==
- G. Harrold Carswell, unsuccessful nominee to the Supreme Court of the United States
- Bud Dupree, outside linebacker for the NFL's Pittsburgh Steelers
- Tylan Grable, New NFL player offensive tackle
- LaRoche Jackson, former defensive back player
- Travis Jones, former assistant Coach of NFL, former football player
- Julian Robert Lindsey, United States Army Major General
