= Will E. Keller =

American entrepreneur (1868–1935)

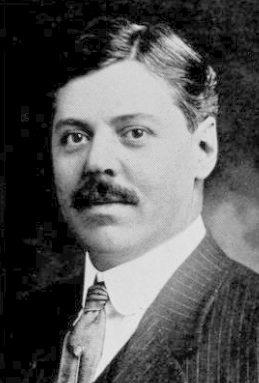
- Born: January 30, 1868; Woodville, Mississippi, US
- Died: January 24, 1935 (aged 66); Los Angeles, California, US
- Occupation: Businessman
- Organizations: Globe Grain and Milling Company (President) * Valley Ice Company (President) * Globe Ice and Cold Storage Company (President) * San Joaquin Valley Farm Lands Company (President) * Ralston Iron Works (Director) * Farmers and Merchants Bank of Los Angeles (Director)
- Known for: President of Globe Grain and Milling Company

Will E. Keller (January 30, 1868 – January 24, 1935) was an American businessman. He was president of the Globe Grain and Milling Company; president of the Valley Ice Company at Fresno, California and Bakersfield, California; president of the Globe Ice and Cold Storage Company at El Paso, Texas; president of the San Joaquin Valley Farm Lands Company; director of the Ralston Iron Works, San Francisco; and director of the Farmers and Merchants Bank of Los Angeles.

== Early years ==
Born in Woodville, Mississippi in 1868, he was the son of Charles E. and Agnes (Phares) Keller. He received his early education in Dallas, Texas, attending the public schools there until the age of 14. He was first employed in the teaming business, which he followed for two years, being engaged later as a railway postal clerk for a year.

== Career ==
Following the line of interests pursued by his father, Keller went into street paving and grading contracting in Dallas and Waco, Texas, which he forsook in 1888 to come to San Diego, California. September 1889 saw his return to Dallas, where he then found occupation in the banking business as bookkeeper for a year and teller for two years. Keller returned to California, this time to Wilmington, where, together with Edward Nathaniel McDonald, he went into the feed and grain business under the firm name of the McDonald Company. Later this company made their headquarters at Los Angeles, where they built a feed mill and were organized as the McDonald Grain and Milling Company, McDonald being the president and Keller the secretary and manager. As the business increased, they also went into flour milling, putting up their first mill at 913 East Third Street in 1898. At McDonald's death, Keller was elected president and in 1902 the name of the company was changed to the Globe Grain and Milling Company.

Besides being president of the Globe Grain and Milling Company, Mr. Keller is president of the Valley Ice Company at Fresno and Bakersfield, Cal., which does all the car icing for the Southern Pacific and the Santa Fe Railroads; president of the Globe Ice and Cold Storage Company at El Paso, Texas; president of the San Joaquin Valley Farm Lands Company, controlling sixty-five thousand acres known as the James ranch; director of the Ralston Iron Works, San Francisco, and of the Merchants’ National Bank, Los Angeles.

== Personal life ==
Keller was a Mason, a member of the Southern California Lodge, Signet Chapter, Golden Gate Commandery, San Francisco, and belonged to the Shrine in Los Angeles. Socially, he identified with the California Club, the Los Angeles Athletic Club and the Los Angeles Country Club, his residence being at West Sixth street and Shatto place, Los Angeles. Politically he espoused Republican principles.

He died in Los Angeles on January 24, 1935.
