= Julie K. Wetherill =

American poet

Julia K. Wetherill
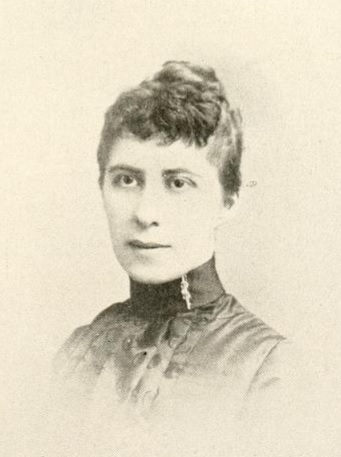
- Circa 1897
- Born: Julia Kein Wetherill; July 15, 1858; Woodville, Mississippi, U.S
- Died: July 25, 1931 (aged 73); New Orleans, Louisiana, U.S.
- Occupations: Writer, poet
- Spouse: Marion A. Baker (m. 1886)
- Writing career
- Pen name: Julia K. Wetherill, J.K.W.

Julia Kein Baker (née Wetherill; July 15, 1858 – July 25, 1931) was an American writer and poet who wrote under the name Julie K. Wetherill and the initials J. K. W.

== Biography ==
Julia Kein Wetherill was born in Woodville, Mississippi and educated in Philadelphia, Pennsylvania.

In 1884, she moved to New Orleans where two years later she married Marion A. Baker, editor of the newspaper New Orleans Times-Democrat. In 1916, she was recorded as being Sunday editor of that newspaper. She wrote "Literary Pathways", a book review column, and "Innocent Bystander", a column concerning the theater and music, both of which appeared in the New Orleans newspapers.

She published a number of short stories in publications including Lippincott's Monthly Magazine, The Atlantic Monthly, The Century Magazine, and The Critic, often under the name Julie K. Wetherill.

Baker's funeral was held in Christ Church Cathedral, and she was buried in Saint Louis Cemetery No. 3.
