= Forest Home Plantation =

Historic house in Mississippi, United States

- U.S. National Register of Historic Places
- Location within Mississippi Location within the United States
- Nearest city: Centreville, Mississippi, U.S.
- Area: 170 acres (69 ha)
- Built: 1836
- Architectural style: Greek Revival
- NRHP reference No.: 82003121
- Added to NRHP: March 19, 1982

The Forest Home Plantation is a Southern plantation located near Centreville, Mississippi, USA. It spans 1,652 acres and previously included a plantation house.

== History ==
The house was designed in the Greek Revival architectural style circa 1850, when it was acquired by Wilson P. Burton. It was acquired by the Crosby Lumber Company in 1943. In 1962, it was purchased by Charles L. Graves. By the 1980s, it was used as a cattle farm. On Friday, March 6, 2015, an electrical fire blazed out of control and burned to the ground.

== Architectural significance ==
The house has been listed on the National Register of Historic Places since March 19, 1982.
