= Possum Corner, Mississippi =

Unincorporated community in Mississippi, United States

- Unincorporated community
- Location within the state of Mississippi
- Coordinates: 31°21′07″N 91°17′59″W
- Country: United States
- State: Mississippi
- County: Wilkinson
- Elevation: 105 ft (32 m)
- Time zone: UTC-6 (Central (CST))
  - Summer (DST): UTC-5 (CDT)
- GNIS feature ID: 694460

Possum Corner is an unincorporated community in Wilkinson County, Mississippi, United States.

The Homochitto River flows north of the settlement.

Several oil fields are located nearby, including the Possum Corner Oil Field, the West Possum Corner Oil Field, and the South Possum Corner Oil Field.
