= Edward Nathaniel McDonald =

American entrepreneur (1832–1899)

Edward Nathaniel McDonald (May 9, 1832 - June 10, 1899) was an American businessman, the principal stockholder and president of the Globe Mills, and president of McDonald Grain and Milling Company.

== Early years ==
McDonald was born in Oswego, New York, in 1832. He was of Scotch-Irish parentage and son of Colon and Jane Winslow McDonald. He was the youngest of eleven children. When 12 years old he went to Canada, where he remained until he was 16 years old, when he returned to Washington County, New York, where he learned the blacksmith trade.

== Career ==
He came to California, arriving in San Francisco October 17, 1853, and in San Pedro the 25th of the same month. He worked at blacksmithing for Alexander & Banning until 1858, when he went into the mercantile business at San Pedro. Soon after, he moved his stock of goods to Wilmington, where he sold out and entered the employ of Banning & Company as superintendent of the building of wharves and warehouses. In 1859, in company with S. H. Wilson, he went into the sheep raising business on Catalina Island and continued in that business until 1862, when, by the dry season and low prices he lost all his property. He became employed again by Banning & Co., as wagon master, and soon had general charge of their freight business and workshops, where he continued until after the American Civil War. In 1865, he engaged in the butcher business in Wilmington. In 1866, he went to Arizona to fill a government contract, where he netted $15,000 in one year. Returning to his home in Wilmington in 1867, he invested his money in land and sheep with good success, and continued in the sheep business for 14 years. From 1886 to 1890, during the land boom, he sold much of his land at a large profit, and invested largely in Los Angeles city property. In 1876, he built the McDonald block on North Main Street. In 1892, he built another block across the street from the first one.

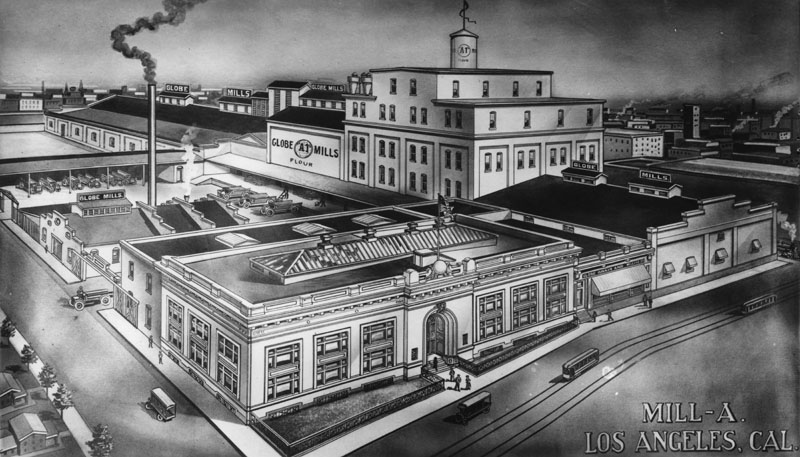
Globe Mill on 3rd Street c.1910s

During the later years of his life he was engaged in the grain business, and built several fine warehouses for storing grain. Together with Will E. Keller, McDonald went into the feed and grain business with a capital of $15,000, under the firm name of the McDonald Company. Initially a $100,000 a year business, it increased to $12,000,000 per year by 1915. Later, this company made its headquarters at Los Angeles, where they built a feed mill at the corner of Molino and Palmetto streets and were organized as the McDonald Grain and Milling Company with a capital of $200,000, McDonald being the president and Keller the secretary and manager. As the business increased, they also went into flour milling, putting up their first mill at 913 East Third street in 1898. McDonald was the principal stockholder and president of the Globe Mills.

== Personal life ==
October 19, 1865, McDonald married Miss Mary Hamilton Winslow of Washington County, New York. They had two sons, Winfred Savage, born March 1, 1871, died June 22, 1896; Ransom Waldon, born October 26, 1872, died November 26, 1886. McDonald amassed quite a large fortune, valued at about $160,000. He died after a lingering illness, at his home in Wilmington, on June 10, 1899, leaving no descendants, his wife alone surviving him.
