= Wilkinson County Christian Academy =

Segregation academy in Mississippi

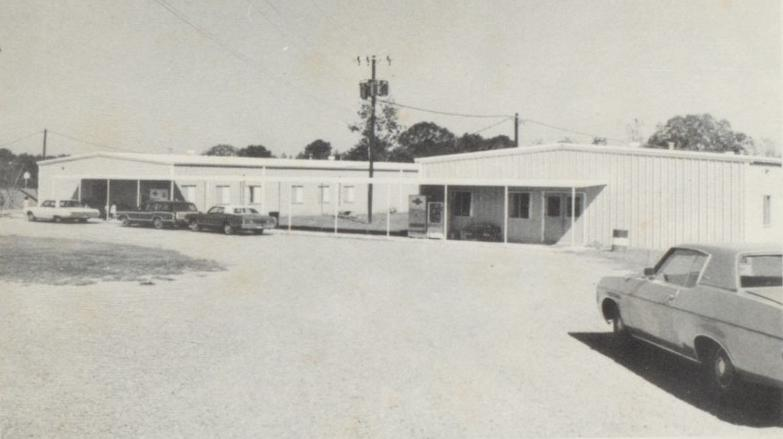

Location
- Woodville, Mississippi; 31.075068°N 91.312062°W

Information
- Type: Private
- Established: 1969
- Principal: James Randolph Holloway
- Grades: PK3-12
- Website: www.wccarams.com

Wilkinson County Christian Academy is a private PK3-12 Christian school in Wilkinson County, Mississippi, near Woodville. It was established in 1969 as a segregation academy.

== History ==
In a 1969 newspaper article, a parent explained that "my kids got to go to school," but that they were attending Wilkinson Christian since "They can't go to school with the coloreds.".

In 1982, Wilkinson Academy teacher Bernard Waites told the Clarion-Ledger that he withdrew his daughter from public schools and sent her to Wilkinson Academy because "there was no way I was going to send her out to a school with 2,700 black kids." Waites, who resigned as Wilkinson County School District superintendent to join the Academy, also said that he had difficulty accepting blacks socially and that he "didn't feel so good walking the halls of the black public schools."

As of 2015 it has 270 students, with the majority being from Wilkinson County; West Feliciana Parish, Louisiana; and East Feliciana Parish, Louisiana. The campus is on U.S. Highway 61 South.

== Athletics ==
The school won the 2016 Mississippi Association of Independent Schools class A-AA football championship. and also the 1988 MPSA class AA football championship. In addition the school won the 1986 class A women’s basketball title and the 1993 men’s class A basketball title

== See also ==
- Wilkinson County School District - The county's public school system
