= Dunnan–Hampton House =

Historic house in Illinois, United States

- U.S. National Register of Historic Places
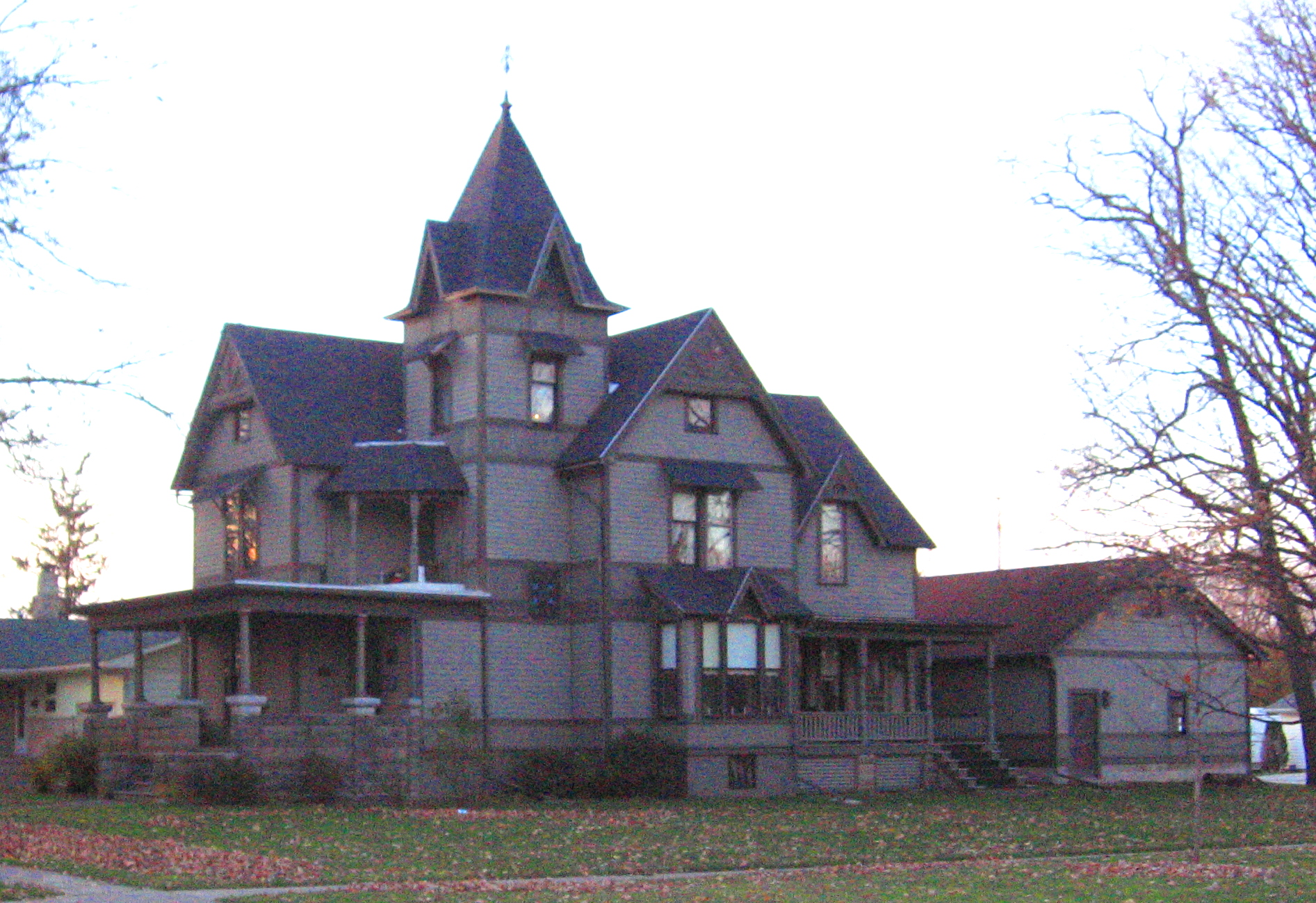
- The Dunnan–Hampton House

- Location within Illinois Location within the United States
- Location: 511 W. Pells St., Paxton, Illinois
- Coordinates: 40°27′46″N 88°6′15″W
- Area: less than one acre
- Built: 1897
- Architect: Yeomans, Charles Howard
- Architectural style: Queen Anne, Stick/Eastlake
- NRHP reference No.: 07000455
- Added to NRHP: May 22, 2007

The Dunnan–Hampton House is an historic building in Paxton, Illinois, United States. It was built in 1897 and purchased by the Dunnan family in 1900. Distinctive features include the cupola, stained glass window, and hand-carved ornate woodwork. It was added to the National Register of Historic Places on May 22, 2007.

Reflective of the Queen Anne style, the house also incorporates elements of Stick Style and Eastlake Style. The house was restored by Ronald and Charlotte Hampton to the point where it is "almost exactly what it was like in 1897”.
