= Rosemont (Woodville, Mississippi) =

Historic house in Mississippi, United States

- U.S. National Register of Historic Places
- Mississippi Landmark
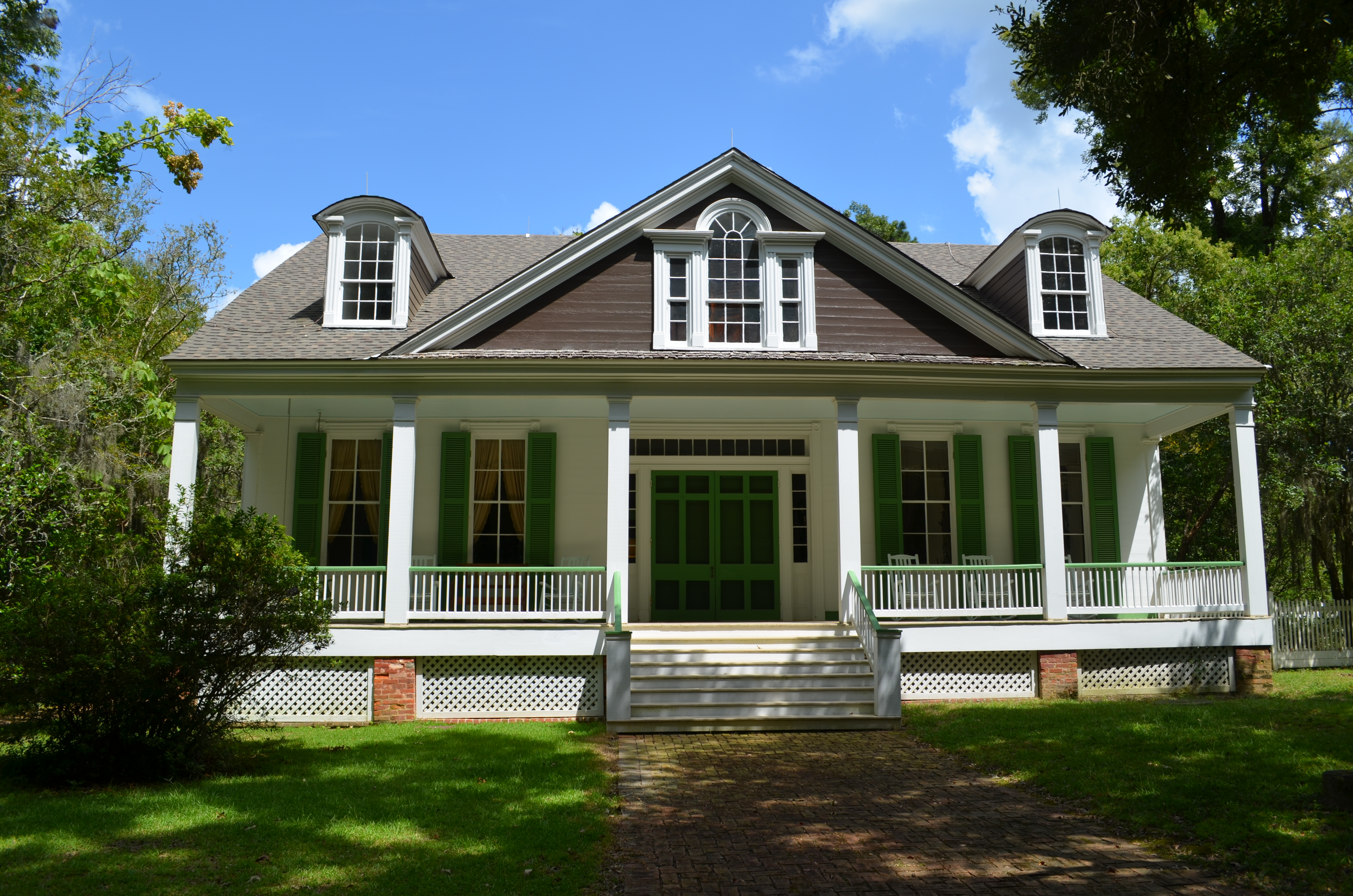
- Rosemont Plantation in 2014

- Location within Mississippi Location within the United States
- Nearest city: Woodville, Mississippi
- Coordinates: 31°6′2″N 91°16′31″W
- Built: 1814
- Website: https://rosemont-plantation.com/
- NRHP reference No.: 74001068
- USMS No.: 095-ABN-0181-NRD-ML

Significant dates
- Added to NRHP: December 30, 1974
- Designated USMS: February 27, 1987

Rosemont, also known as Rosemont Plantation, Poplar Grove or Hale House, is a plantation house built in 1814 near Woodville in Wilkinson County, Mississippi. It was the boyhood family home of Jefferson Davis, President of the Confederate States of America 1861–1865. It was listed on the National Register of Historic Places in 1974 and designated a Mississippi Landmark in 1987. It is open to the public for tours.

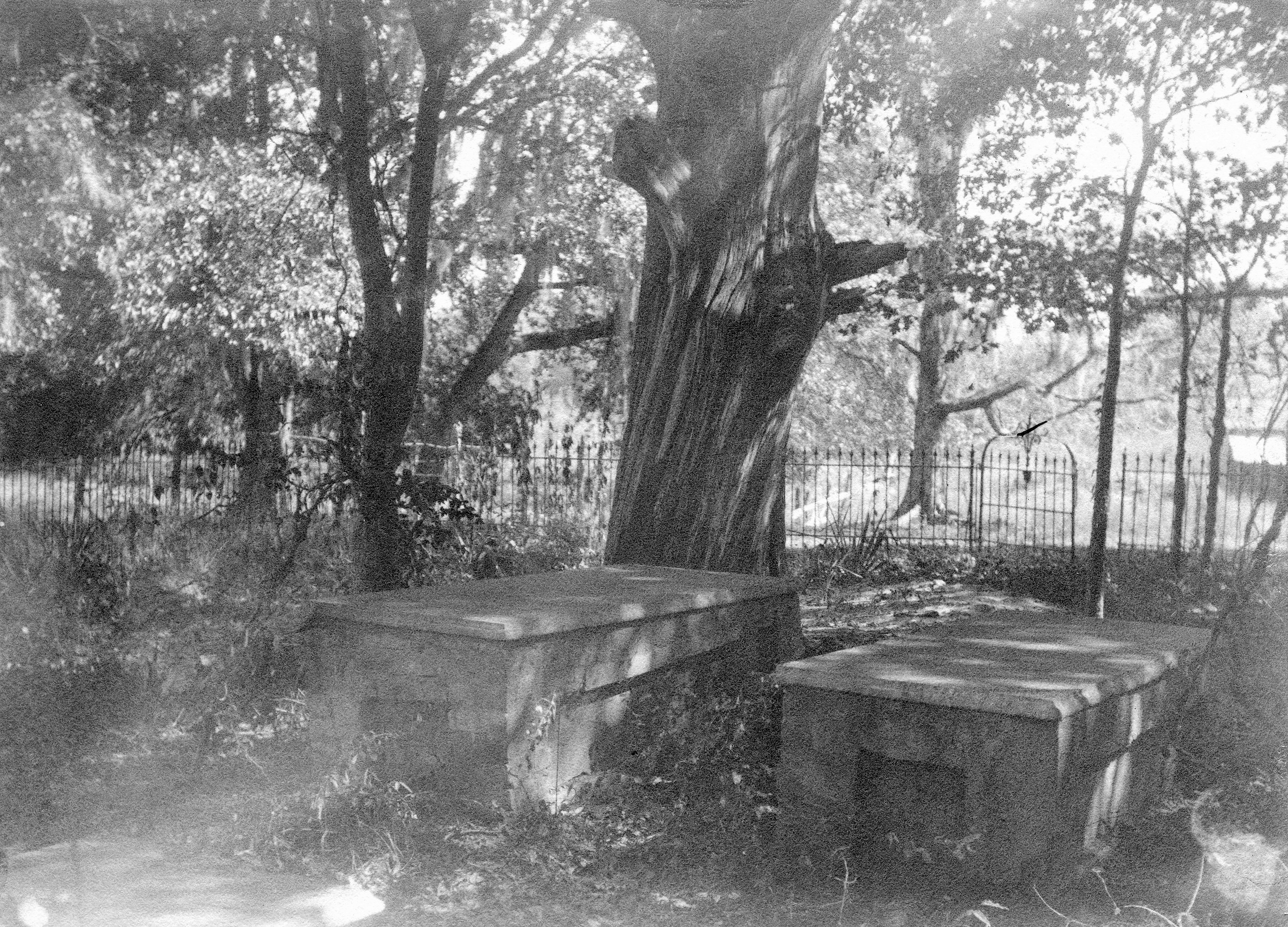
Grave of Jefferson Davis' mother in family cemetery behind Rosemont, circa 1938–1941
