= Hampton Inn (New Canaan, Connecticut) =

- U.S. National Register of Historic Places
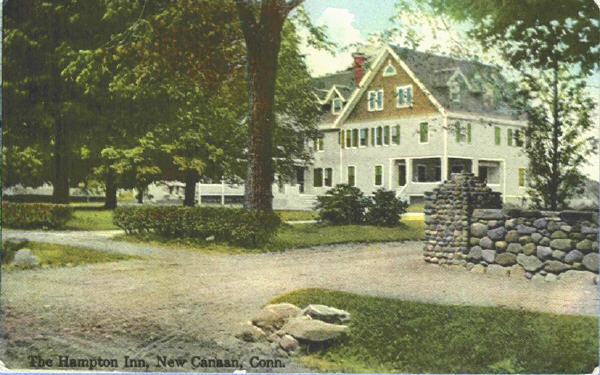
- Hampton Inn, as shown in a postcard mailed about 1909

- Location within Connecticut Location within the United States
- Location: 179 Oenoke Ridge, New Canaan, Connecticut
- Coordinates: 41°9′16″N 73°30′0″W
- Area: 1.6 acres (0.65 ha)
- Built: 1908
- Architect: Elwood, Robert; Elwood Brothers
- Architectural style: Colonial Revival, Queen Anne
- NRHP reference No.: 89001106
- Added to NRHP: October 27, 2004

The Hampton Inn, also known as The Maples Inn, is a historic former hotel property at 179 Oenoke Ridge in New Canaan, Connecticut. It is a three-story wood frame Colonial Revival structure, built in 1908 as a vacation boarding house. It is the only surviving building of its type in New Canaan. The property was listed on the National Register of Historic Places in 2004.

== Description and history ==
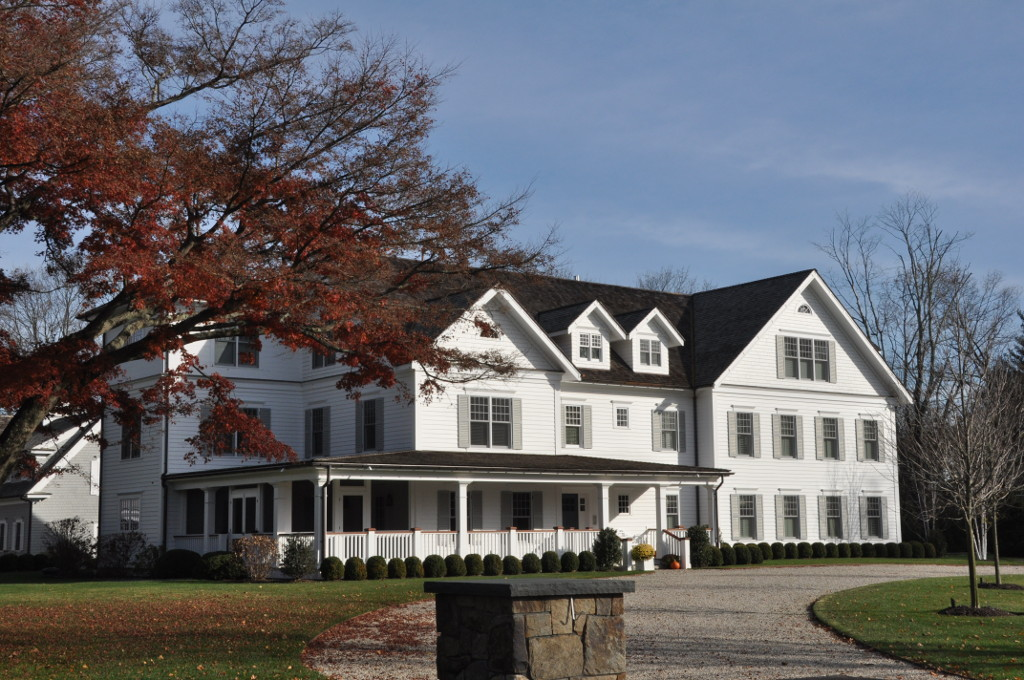
The former inn in 2015

The former Hampton Inn stands north of the village center of New Canaan, on the east side of Oenoke Ridge opposite the First Presbyterian Church. It is a large roughly rectangular frame structure, whose basic plan includes slightly projecting front-facing gables at both ends of the front facade. A single-story porch wraps around the smaller left gable, its hip roof supported by square posts. The property includes a c. 1890s innkeeper's residence and a more modern 1940s structure housing a garage and apartments.

The inn was built in 1908, capitalizing on a trend begun as early as 1869 to cater to a growing summer vacation trade in the town. Early summer vacationers were boarded in private residences, with the adjacent William Bond House (now the Roger Sherman Inn) being one of the first to be fully converted for use as a boarding house. The Hampton Inn was built for, and operated by, Mrs. W.H. Thompson. Guests during its heyday included actress Lillian Gish and the wife of Chinese nationalist leader Chiang Kai-Shek. Business declined in the post-World War II period, but the inn remained open, undergoing a major rehabilitation in the 1980s. The building now no longer serves as an inn.

== See also ==
- National Register of Historic Places listings in Fairfield County, Connecticut
