= USS General W. H. Gordon =

US Navy WWII troop transport

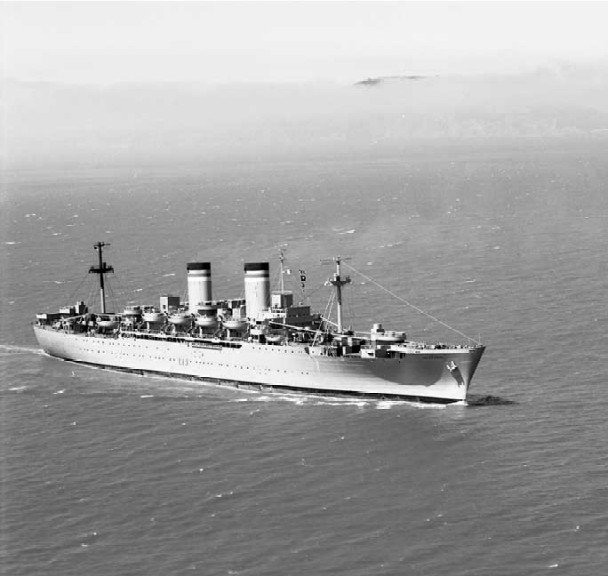
- USNS General W. H. Gordon (T-AP-117) in San Francisco Bay, October 1967

History

United States
- Name: USS General W. H. Gordon
- Namesake: Major General Walter Henry Gordon, United States Army
- Builder: Federal Shipbuilding & Drydock
- Laid down: 2 November 1943
- Launched: 7 May 1944
- Sponsored by: Mrs Leslie J. McNair
- Commissioned: 29 Jun 1944 – 11 Mar 1946; Mid-1946 – Nov 1951 (US Army); Nov 1951 – Oct 1955
- Recommissioned: May 1961
- Decommissioned: Apr 1970
- Reclassified: T-AP-117 (November 1951)
- Stricken: Three times: 1946, 1958 and March 1986
- Identification: MC hull type P2-S2-R2, MC hull no. 675; IMO number: 8424630
- Honors and awards: Four service stars for Korean War service and two for the Vietnam War
- Fate: Scrapped 1987, Taiwan

General characteristics
- Class & type: General John Pope-class transport
- Displacement: 11,450 tons (lt); 20,175 tons fully laden
- Length: 622 feet 7 inches (189.76 m)
- Beam: 75 feet 6 inches (23.01 m)
- Draft: 25 feet 6 inches (7.77 m)
- Installed power: 17,000 shp
- Propulsion: 2 steam turbines, reduction gearing, twin screw
- Speed: 20.6 to 21 knots (38.2 to 38.9 km/h) (sources vary)
- Capacity: 4,244
- Complement: 533
- Armament: 4 x single 5"/38 caliber dual purpose guns, 4 x quad 1.1" guns, replaced by 20 x single 20mm guns

USS General W. H. Gordon (AP-117) was a troop transport that served with the United States Navy in World War II. After the war, she was transferred to the US Army and served as USAT General W. H. Gordon. In the mid to late 1940s she sailed in trans-Pacific American President Lines passenger service with sister ship SS General Meigs. With the outbreak of the Korean War, she was reacquired by the Navy as a civilian-crewed Military Sea Transportation Service (MSTS) vessel, and redesignated USNS General W. H. Gordon (T-AP-117). She served again under the same designation in the Vietnam War.

General W. H. Gordon was launched under Maritime Commission contract by the Federal Shipbuilding and Drydock Company of Kearny, New Jersey, 7 May 1944; and commissioned, after being acquired by the Navy, 29 June 1944.

== World War II ==
Following her shakedown cruise in Chesapeake Bay, General W. H. Gordon proceeded to Boston and sailed 5 September in convoy for France. She arrived Cherbourg with troop reinforcements 15 September and returned to New York via Plymouth 30 September 1944.

Subsequently, the transport made 12 voyages to various European and African ports in support of the accelerating Allied effort against the Axis. She carried supplies, troops, and took large numbers of German prisoners of war to the United States.

General W. H. Gordon sailed to Panama from France 5 August 1945, bringing replacement troops for the Pacific campaigns. She stopped at Ulithi and Manila to debark troops and steamed into San Francisco Bay 25 September 1945.

=== After hostilities ===
The war over, the veteran transport sailed again 13 October with over 4,000 occupation troops for Japan and Korea. After one more voyage to Japan, the ship returned to San Francisco 29 January 1946 and decommissioned at Oakland 11 March. She was then stricken from the Naval Vessel Register, and transferred to the War Shipping Administration (WSA). Subsequently, she was put to use by the Army Transport Service, as USAT General W. H. Gordon.

== Army transport ==
General W. H. Gordon was one of two ships of her class chartered by WSA to the American President Lines (APL) in mid-1946 for postwar operation as troopships, the other being General M. C. Meigs. A design designated P2-S2-R10 was prepared, probably for the full conversion of these two ships to passenger liners, but the project was not carried out.

While in civilian service the ship appears to have been painted in APL colors but retained the name General W. H. Gordon. She made numerous calls at Shanghai, China. In September 1949 the ship evacuated 1220 people of 34 different nationalities, most of them American citizens, after protracted negotiations by the U.S. State Department with both Nationalist Chinese and Communist Chinese authorities after the Communists had taken over the city.

In March 1950, at Tientsin, China, she embarked hundreds of Westerners again as well as the U.S. Consul General from Shanghai, who a few days earlier had hauled down his flag, the last flying over a diplomatic post in mainland China.

== Korean War ==
In November 1951, upon expiration of APL's charter, she was taken into the Military Sea Transportation Service (MSTS), reinstated on the Naval Vessel Register and placed in service as a civilian-crewed Navy transport. USNS General W. H. Gordon (T-AP-117) departed San Francisco in December 1951 on the first of many trans-Pacific voyages in support of Korean War operations.

== 1950s-1960s ==
She was modernized at Portland, Oregon, between June and December 1953, with her World War II vintage lifeboats and davits being replaced and eight new empty positions for 3 in (76 mm)/50 twin gun mounts fitted, presumably for service as a regular Navy armed transport if required. However, the need for large troop transports declined, and General W. H. Gordon was inactive between October 1954 and March 1955. Transferred to the Atlantic in late 1956, she was laid up in the Maritime Administration's Hudson River reserve fleet in June 1957 and a year later stricken from the Naval Vessel Register.

In May 1961 the Navy reacquired General W. H. Gordon from the Maritime Administration, reinstated her on the Naval Vessel Register and returned her to MSTS service. She spent the next several years carrying troops between New York and Bremerhaven, West Germany.

In March to April 1963, General W. H. Gordon made a one time voyage under contract to the UN. She sailed from New York, bound for Dar es Salaam, Tanganyika (now part of Tanzania). There, she embarked Indian troops to transport them back to their home country. The voyage to Bombay took six days.

== Vietnam War ==
In 1965 the transport went to the Pacific to support the expanding Vietnam War, making numerous voyages between the U.S. West Coast and Southeast Asia. The first shipment of troops from the United States occurred on or about 3 June 1965 from the Oakland Army Terminal docks. Elements of the 1st Infantry Division (16th, 18th and 28th infantry battalions) arrived in Oakland by air or on a train from Fort Riley, Kansas. The 1st Battalion, 18th Infantry Regiment arrived at Cam Ranh Bay on 20 June 1965. Other elements of the 1st Infantry Division continued on to Vũng Tàu and disembarked on 15 July 1965. On 21 July 1966 she departed from Tacoma Washington with elements of the 4th Infantry Division from Fort Lewis, Washington arriving at Qui Nhon Harbor on 6 August 1966. There were 800 troops on board. Following disembarkation, the unit was transported to a base camp at the foot of Dragon Mountain near Pleiku, later renamed Camp Enari. She was also credited with participating in the Vietnamese Counteroffensive and the Tet Counteroffensive between December 1967 and March 1968. In September 1967 she transported troops from the 198th Infantry Brigade from Oakland to Da Nang harbor, arriving after a stop at Subic Bay in the Philippines in October 1967.

== Final decommission ==
General W. H. Gordon was laid up in the Maritime Administration's National Defense Reserve Fleet on the James River, Virginia in April 1970, stricken from the Naval Vessel Register in March 1986 and sold for scrapping in April 1987.

== Awards ==
- European-African-Middle Eastern Campaign Medal
- World War II Victory Medal
- Navy Occupation Medal
- National Defense Service Medal with star
- Korean Service Medal with four campaign stars
- Vietnam Service Medal with two campaign stars
- United Nations Service Medal
- Republic of Vietnam Campaign Medal
