= C.C. Hampton Homestead =

- U.S. National Register of Historic Places
- U.S. Historic district
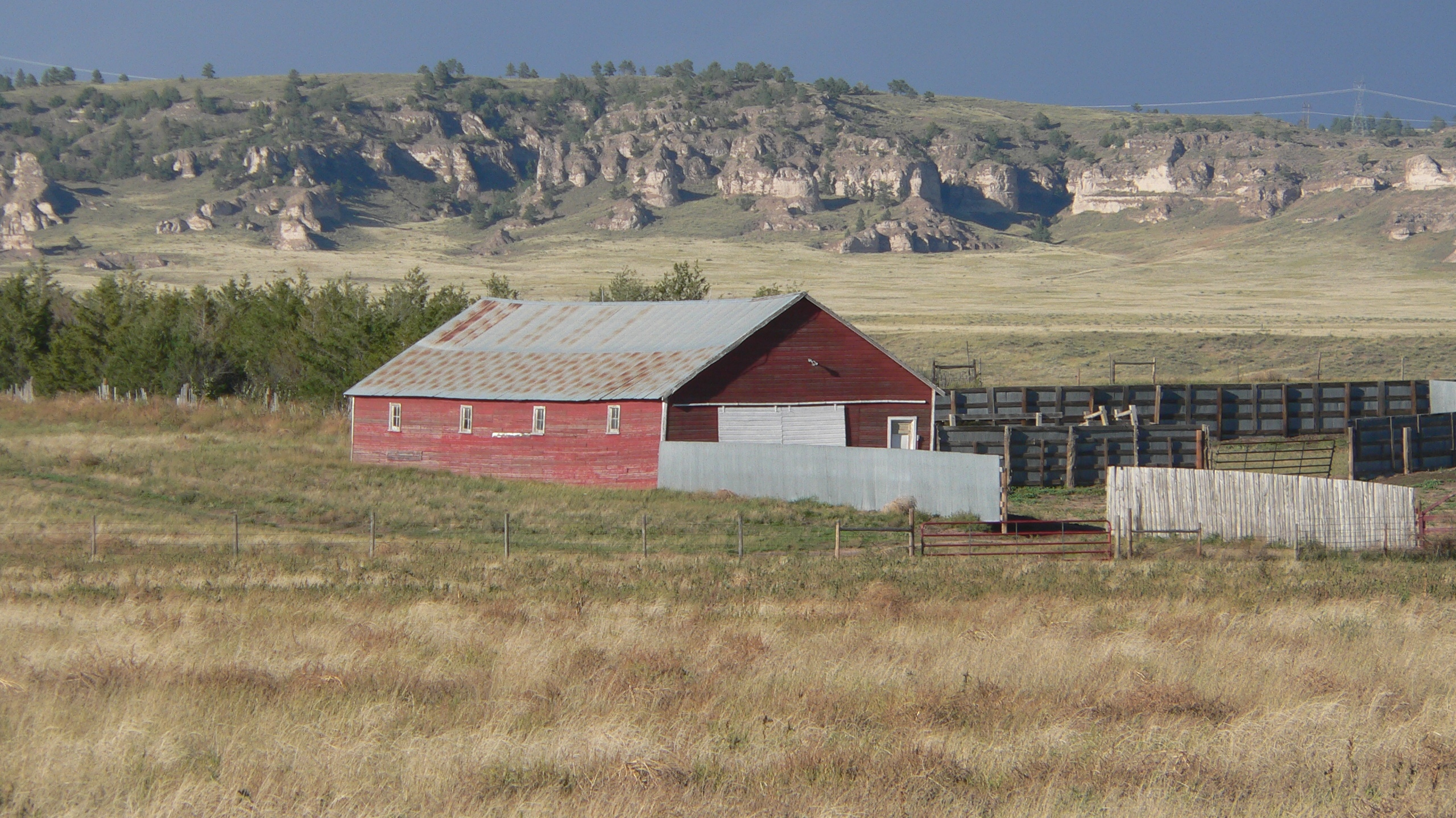

- Location within Nebraska Location within the United States
- Location: 2170 Road 40
- Nearest city: Harrisburg, Nebraska
- Coordinates: 41°40′17″N 103°51′26″W
- Area: 160 acres (65 ha)
- Built: 1890
- Built by: Hampton, C. C.
- NRHP reference No.: 84000501
- Added to NRHP: December 13, 1984

The C.C. Hampton Homestead near Harrisburg, Nebraska, dates from 1890 and is listed on the National Register of Historic Places as a 160-acre (65 ha) historic district. Also known as Warner Ranch, the property included 10 contributing buildings and one other contributing structure.

It was the 1887–1902 homestead of a farmer who promoted water conservation and Aermotor windmills, helping region diversify from ranching into farming.

It was listed on the National Register of Historic Places in 1984.
