= Hampton Hall (Woodville, Mississippi) =

Historic house in Mississippi, United States

- U.S. National Register of Historic Places
- Location within Mississippi Location within the United States
- Location: MS 61, Woodville, Mississippi, U.S.
- Coordinates: 31°5′40″N 91°17′30″W
- Area: 6 acres (2.4 ha)
- Built: 1825–1832
- NRHP reference No.: 80002307
- Added to NRHP: October 24, 1980

Hampton Hall is a historic mansion in Woodville, Mississippi, USA.

== History ==
The land belonged to John Brown until he sold it to Hugh Connell in 1820. Connell built the house circa 1825–1832. It was purchased by Susan Davis in 1847, followed by Daniel Hoard in 1849. When he died in 1869, it was inherited by his widow, Verona Regular, followed by her niece Joan McManus in 1875. One of her daughters, Blanche McManus, became a noted children's author, and inherited the house with her two sisters in 1909. She did the murals in the parlour.

The house was purchased by Maxwell Bramlette in 1947. It was inherited by David Clay Bramlette III in 1976.

== Architectural significance ==
It has been listed on the National Register of Historic Places since October 24, 1980.
