= Hampton Hall (Franklin, Kentucky) =

- U.S. National Register of Historic Places
- U.S. Historic district
- Location within Kentucky Location within the United States
- Location: 6240 Bowling Green Rd., Franklin, Kentucky
- Coordinates: 36°48′46″N 86°33′5″W
- Area: 196 acres (79 ha)
- Built: 1838
- Built by: Hampton, Benjamin
- Architectural style: Classical Revival
- NRHP reference No.: 95001519
- Added to NRHP: January 11, 1996

Hampton Hall in Franklin, Kentucky is a farm with an Early Classical Revival mansion built in 1838. It has a two-story portico with four fluted Doric columns at its front entry. An earlier log cabin is attached to the two-story house.

It was listed on the National Register of Historic Places in 1996. The listing includes six contributing buildings, one additional contributing structure, and one contributing site, over a 196-acre (79 ha) area.
