= Wilkinson County School District (Mississippi) =

School district in Mississippi

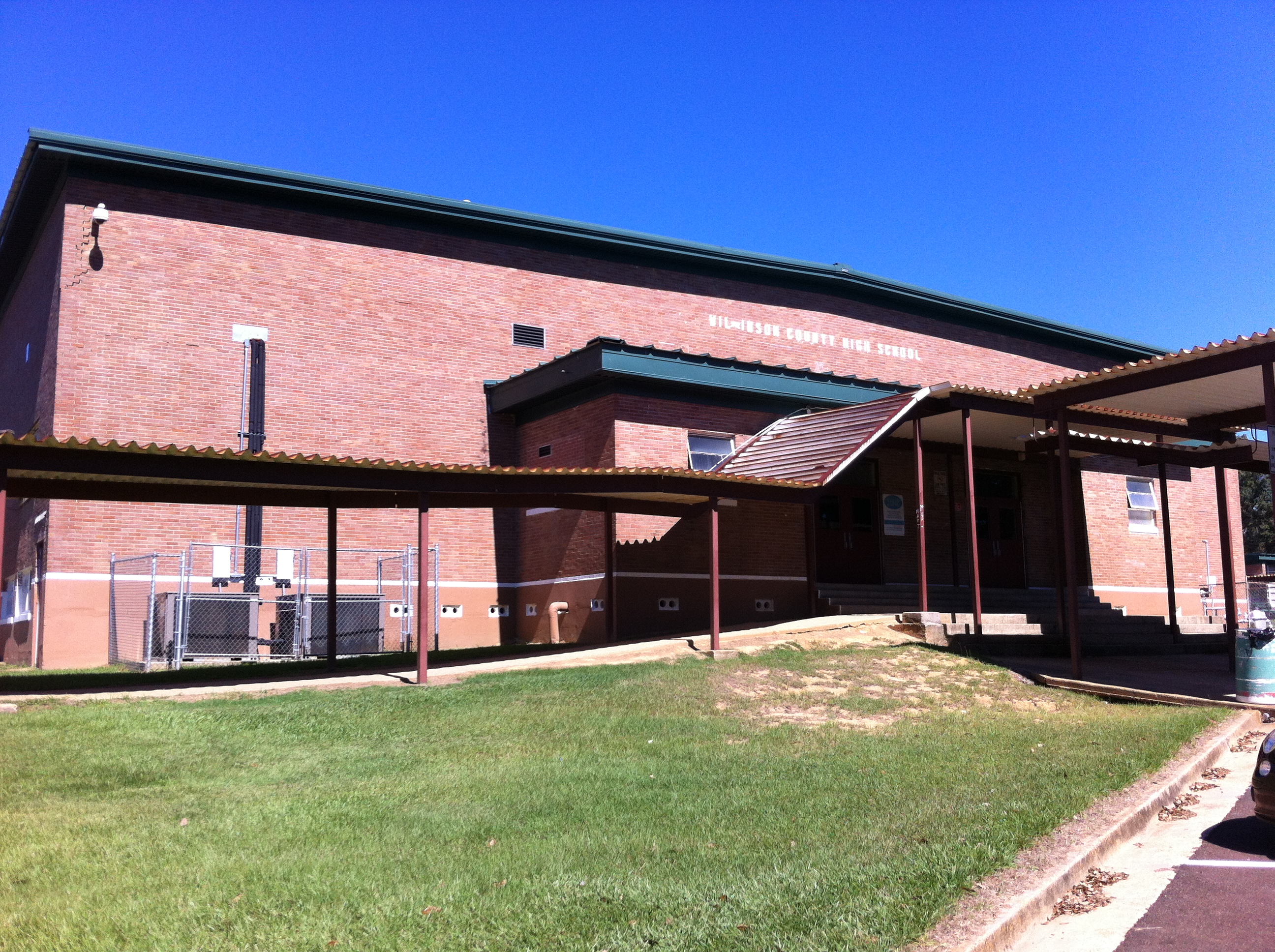
Wilkinson County High School

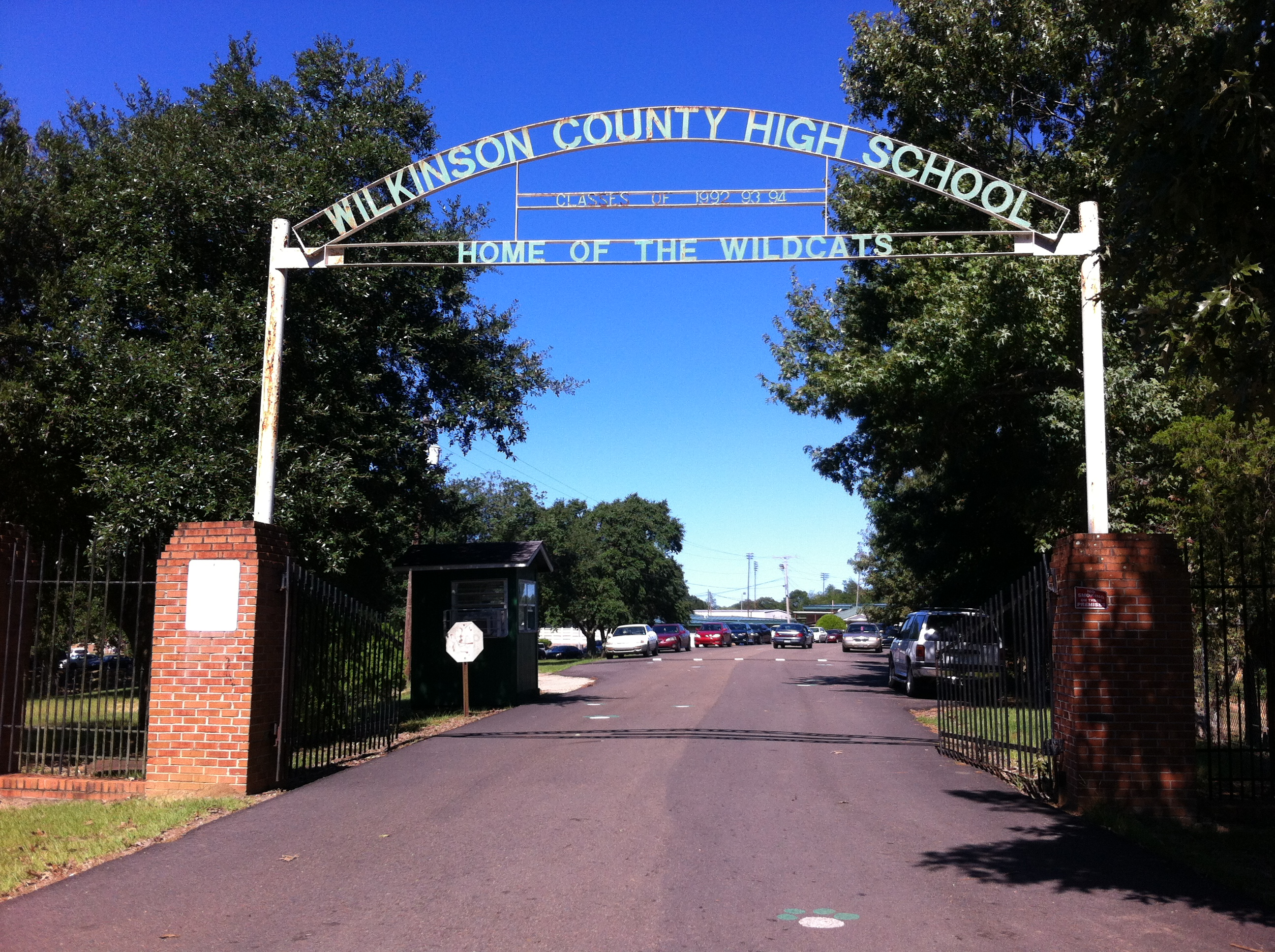
Wilkinson County High School entrance gate

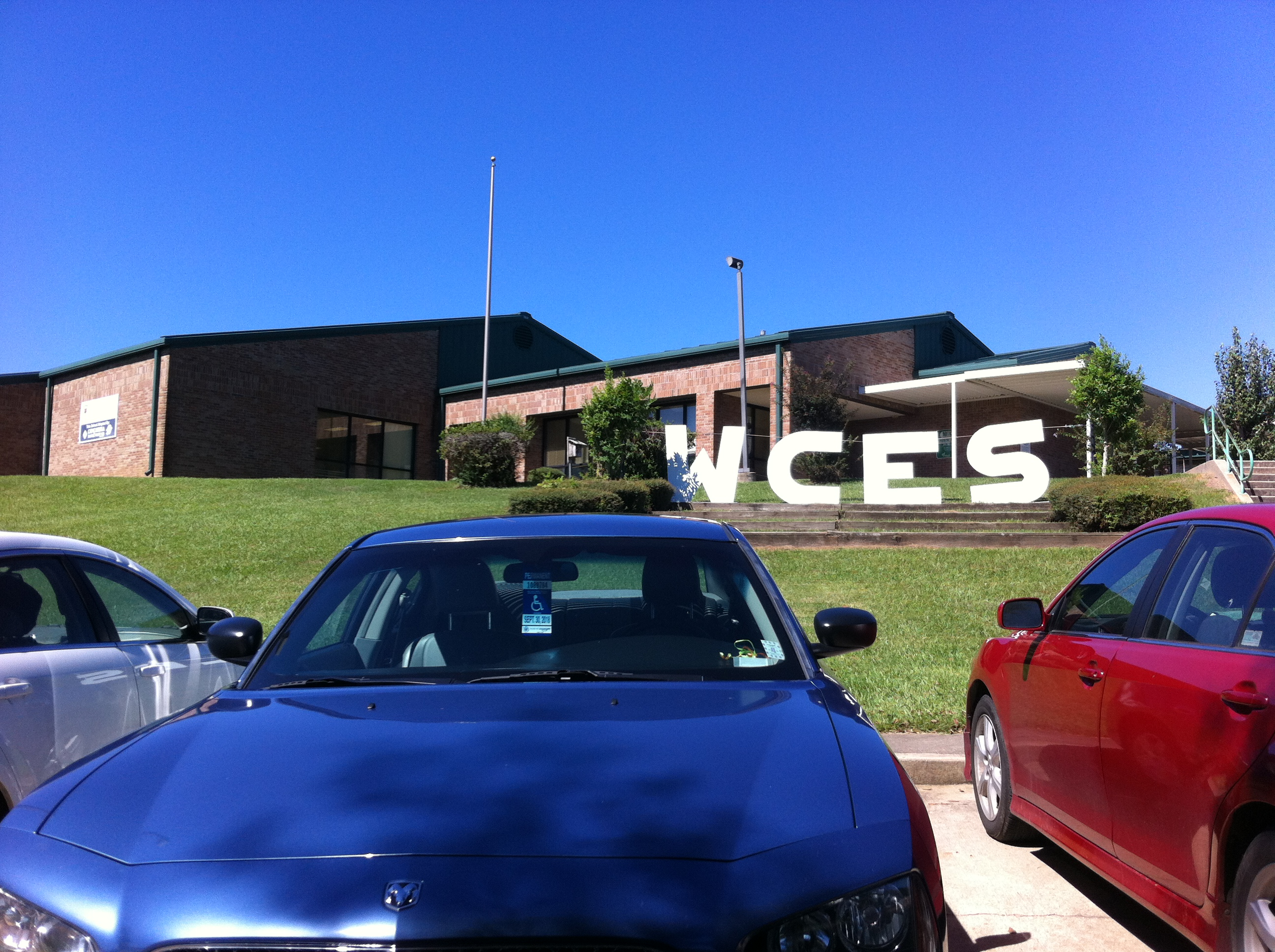
Wilkinson County Elementary School

The Wilkinson County School District is a public school district based in Woodville, Mississippi (USA). The district's boundaries parallel that of Wilkinson County. In addition to Woodville, the district includes the Wilkinson County portions of Centreville and Crosby.

== Schools ==
- Wilkinson County High School (Unincorporated area near Woodville)
- William Winans Middle School (Centreville)
- Wilkinson County Elementary School (Unincorporated area with Wilkinson County High School)
- Finch Elementary School (Unincorporated area near Centreville)

== Demographics ==
=== 2007-08 school year ===
There were a total of 1,371 students enrolled in the Wilkinson County School District during the 2007–2008 school year. The gender makeup of the district was 49% female and 51% male. The racial makeup of the district was 99.56% African American, 0.36% White, and 0.07% Hispanic.

=== Previous school years ===
School Year	Enrollment	Gender Makeup		Racial Makeup				
School Year	Enrollment	Female	Male	Asian	African American	Hispanic	Native American	White
2020-21	2,106	49%	51%	–	98.58%	–	–	1.42%
2006-07	3,458	49%	51%	–	99.72%	–	–	0.28%
2005-06	1,589	50%	50%	–	99.37%	–	–	0.63%
2004-05	1,524	48%	52%	–	99.48%	–	–	0.52%
2003-04	1,563	48%	52%	–	98.53%	–	–	1.47%
2002-03	1,537	48%	52%	–	99.35%	–	–	0.65%

== Accountability statistics ==
	2007-08	2006-07	2005-06	2004-05	2003-04	2002-03
District Accreditation Status	Accredited	Accredited	Accredited	Accredited	Accredited	Accredited
School Performance Classifications
Level 5 (Superior Performing) Schools	No School; Performance; Classifications; Assigned	1	0	0	0	0
Level 4 (Exemplary) Schools	No School; Performance; Classifications; Assigned	0	1	2	1	0
Level 3 (Successful) Schools	No School; Performance; Classifications; Assigned	1	3	2	1	2
Level 2 (Under Performing) Schools	No School; Performance; Classifications; Assigned	2	0	0	2	1
Level 1 (Low Performing) Schools	No School; Performance; Classifications; Assigned	0	0	0	0	0
Not Assigned	No School; Performance; Classifications; Assigned	0	0	0	0	0

== See also ==
- List of school districts in Mississippi
- Wilkinson County Christian Academy, a school founded in 1969 as a segregation academy.
