= Woodville, Mississippi =

- Town
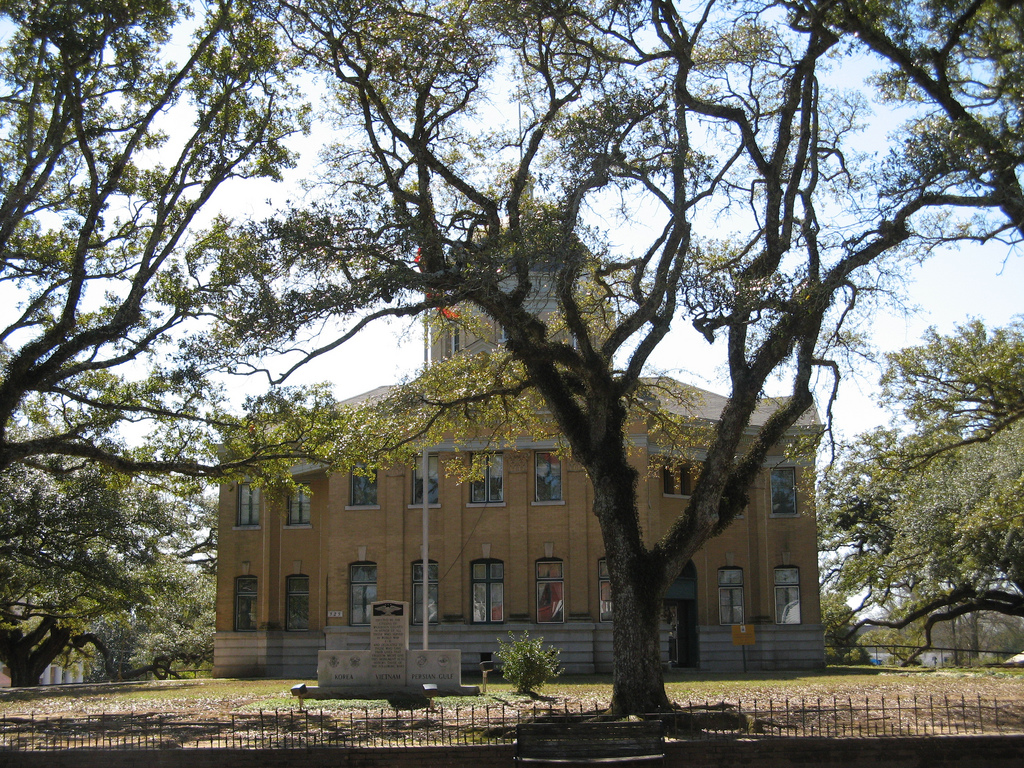
- Wilkinson County Courthouse in Woodville

- Location of Woodville, Mississippi

- Location in the United States
- Coordinates: 31°6′10″N 91°17′59″W
- Country: United States
- State: Mississippi
- County: Wilkinson

Government
  - Mayor: Jesse Stewart 2025-

Area
  - Total: 1.03 sq mi (2.68 km^{2})
  - Land: 1.03 sq mi (2.68 km^{2})
  - Water: 0 sq mi (0.00 km^{2})
- Elevation: 404 ft (123 m)

Population (2020)
  - Total: 928
  - Density: 895.7/sq mi (345.83/km^{2})
- Time zone: UTC-6 (Central (CST))
  - Summer (DST): UTC-5 (CDT)
- ZIP code: 39669
- Area code: 601
- FIPS code: 28-81120
- GNIS feature ID: 0679870
- Website: www.woodvillems.org

Woodville is one of the oldest towns in Mississippi and is the county seat of Wilkinson County, Mississippi, United States. Its population as of 2020 was 928.

== Geography ==
According to the United States Census Bureau, the town has a total area of 1.1 square miles (2.8 km^{2}), all land.

== History ==
According to a steamboat man named Samuel Clement, after the Battle of New Orleans, Andrew Jackson took from the U.S. armory two cannons that had been used at the Battle of Saratoga and sent one to Woodville and one to Natchez. In 1831 there was a plan to build a railroad from Woodville to St. Francisville at Bayou Sara under the title of West Feliciana Railroad Company.

- Needs a year that the city was founded.

Woodville Historic District, encompassing many of the older buildings in the urban center, was added to the National Register of Historic Places in 1982.

== Demographics ==
Historical population
Census	Pop.	Note	%±
1880	965		—
1890	950		−1.6%
1900	1,043		9.8%
1910	1,233		18.2%
1920	1,012		−17.9%
1930	1,113		10.0%
1940	1,433		28.8%
1950	1,609		12.3%
1960	1,856		15.4%
1970	1,734		−6.6%
1980	1,512		−12.8%
1990	1,393		−7.9%
2000	1,192		−14.4%
2010	1,096		−8.1%
2020	928		−15.3%
U.S. Decennial Census

=== Racial and ethnic composition ===
Woodville town, Mississippi – Racial and ethnic composition Note: the US Census treats Hispanic/Latino as an ethnic category. This table excludes Latinos from the racial categories and assigns them to a separate category. Hispanics/Latinos may be of any race.
Race / Ethnicity (NH = Non-Hispanic)	Pop 2000	Pop 2010	Pop 2020	% 2000	% 2010	% 2020
White alone (NH)	291	250	217	24.41%	22.81%	23.38%
Black or African American alone (NH)	882	823	677	73.99%	75.09%	72.95%
Native American or Alaska Native alone (NH)	0	6	2	0.00%	0.55%	0.22%
Asian alone (NH)	0	0	1	0.00%	0.00%	0.11%
Native Hawaiian or Pacific Islander alone (NH)	0	0	0	0.00%	0.00%	0.00%
Other race alone (NH)	0	0	2	0.00%	0.00%	0.22%
Mixed race or Multiracial (NH)	11	8	24	0.92%	0.73%	2.59%
Hispanic or Latino (any race)	8	9	5	0.67%	0.82%	0.54%
Total	1,192	1,096	928	100.00%	100.00%	100.00%

=== 2020 census ===
Per the 2020 United States census, there were 928 people, 386 households, and 277 families residing in the town; its racial composition was 77.95% black, 22.38% non-Hispanic white, 0.22% Native American, 0.11% Asian, 2.8% other or mixed, and 0.54% Hispanic or Latino of any race.

== Education ==
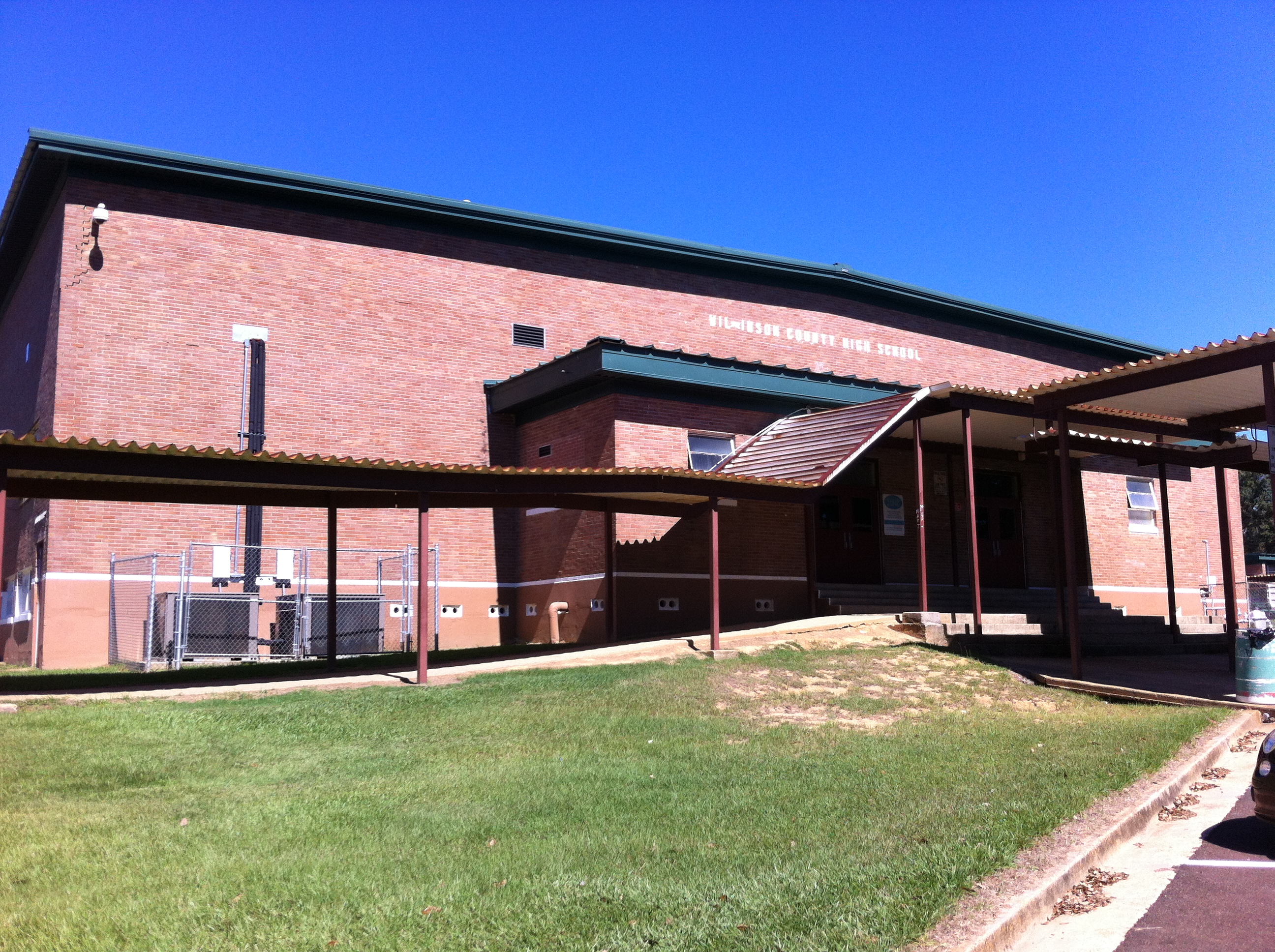
Wilkinson County High School

Wilkinson County School District serves Woodville. There are three education facilities near Woodville: Wilkinson County Elementary School, Wilkinson County High School, and the private school Wilkinson County Christian Academy, which was established in 1969 as a segregation academy.

Wilkinson County is in the district of Southwest Mississippi Community College.

== Media ==
The Woodville Republican, a weekly newspaper founded in 1823, is the oldest surviving business (and thus the oldest newspaper) in Mississippi.

== Notable people ==
- Julia K. Wetherill Baker (1858–1931), writer and poet, was born in Woodville
- Betty Bentley Beaumont (1828–1892), author, merchant, cotton factor, hotel owner
- Henry Cohen (rabbi), served here from 1885 to 1888 before going to Galveston, Texas, where he became a nationally known community leader
- Jefferson Davis, President of the Confederate States of America; lived near here for a couple of years as a youth on Rosemont, his parents' plantation, and attended Woodville Academy before going to school in Kentucky.
- Ronnie Edwards, Louisiana politician, born in Woodville
- George Gonda, NFL player and mayor of Woodville
- Will E. Keller, businessman
- Rudolph Matthews, handball player
- Edward Grady Partin (1924–1990), born in Woodville, he became a Teamsters Union business agent from Baton Rouge. His testimony sent Jimmy Hoffa to prison.
- Carnot Posey, Civil War Confederate general
- Peter Randolph, early 19th century Federal judge
- Dan Reneau, President of Louisiana Tech University
- William Grant Still, African-American classical composer and Mississippi Musicians Hall of Fame inductee was born in Woodville on May 11, 1895.
- Matt Tolbert, professional baseball infielder
- W. P. S. Ventress (1854–1911), Mississippi state legislator
- George W. Wheeler, Chief Justice of the Connecticut Supreme Court (1920–30)
- Lester Young (1909–1959), jazz musician and Mississippi Musicians Hall of Fame inductee was born in Woodville.
- William Henry Young, Wisconsin politician, born in Woodville
