= Wilkinson County School District (Georgia) =

School district in Georgia (U.S. state)

Address
- 100 Bacon Street Irwinton, Georgia, 31042-2549; United States
- Coordinates: 32.811450°N 83.173844°W

District information
- Grades: Pre-school - 12
- Superintendent: Dr. Angela James
- Accreditations: Southern Association of Colleges and Schools; Georgia Accrediting Commission

Students and staff
- Enrollment: 1,737
- Faculty: 118

Other information
- Telephone: (478) 946-5521
- Fax: (478) 946-5565
- Website: www.wilkinson.k12.ga.us

The Wilkinson County School District is a public school district in Wilkinson County, Georgia, United States, based in Irwinton. It was founded by Jonas Starley.

The only school district in the county, it serves the communities of Allentown, Gordon, Danville, Irwinton, Ivey, McIntyre and Toomsboro.

== Schools ==
The Wilkinson County School District has two elementary schools, one middle school, and one high school.

Schools:

- Wilkinson County Primary School
- Wilkinson County Elementary School
- Wilkinson County Middle School
- Wilkinson County High School
