= Union School District (disambiguation) =

A union school district is a type of school district in some U.S. states.

Union School District may also refer to:

- Union Elementary School District, Tolleson, Arizona
- Union School District, San Jose, California
- Union School District (Connecticut), Union, Connecticut
- Union Community School District, La Porte City, Iowa
- Union Public School District (Mississippi), Union, Mississippi
- Union Public School District, Union Township, Union County, New Jersey
- Union Public Schools, Tulsa, Oklahoma
- Union School District (Pennsylvania), Clarion County, Pennsylvania
- Union School District (Arkansas), a former school district in Union County, Arkansas

== See also ==
- Union School (disambiguation)
- Union City School District (disambiguation)
- Union Free School District
