= Union School =

Union School or Old Union School or variations may refer to:

in Haiti

- Union School Haiti

in the United States

- Old Union School (Birdell, Arkansas), listed on the National Register of Historic Places (NRHP)
- Geyserville Union School (Geyserville, California), NRHP-listed
- Union School (West Haven, Connecticut), NRHP-listed
- Union School (Filer, Idaho), NRHP-listed
- Burns Union School, Burns, Kansas, NRHP-listed
- Union Station School (Paducah, Kentucky), NRHP-listed
- Union School (Searsport, Maine), NRHP-listed
- Douglas Union School, Douglas, Michigan, NRHP-listed
- Union School (St. Johns, Michigan), NRHP-listed
- Union School (Natchez, Mississippi)
- Newton Union Schoolhouse (Camden, New Jersey), NRHP-listed
- Union Schoolhouse, Red Bank, New Jersey, NRHP-listed
- East Otto Union School, East Otto, New York, NRHP-listed
- East Springfield Union School, East Springfield, New York, NRHP-listed
- Old Union School (Chesterville, Ohio), NRHP-listed
- Old Union School (Coshocton, Ohio), NRHP-listed
- West Union School, Norwich, Ohio, NRHP-listed
- Union School (Fort Washington, Pennsylvania), NRHP-listed
- Dillingersville Union School and Church, Zionsville, Pennsylvania, NRHP-listed
- First Union School (Crozier, Virginia), NRHP-listed
- Second Union School, Goochland, Virginia, NRHP-listed

== See also ==
- Union High School (disambiguation)
- Union School District (disambiguation)
