= History of Natchez, Mississippi =

The city of Natchez, Mississippi, was founded in 1716 as Fort Rosalie and was renamed for the Natchez people in 1763.

== Pre-European settlement (to 1716) ==
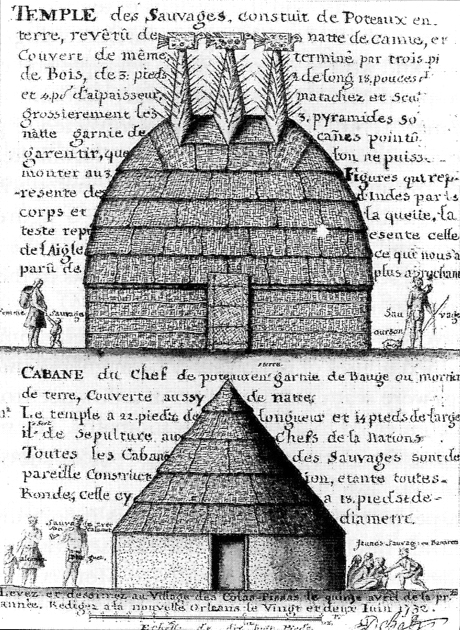
Great Temple on Mound C and the Sun Chiefs cabin, drawn by Alexandre de Batz in the 1730s

According to archaeological excavations, the area has been continuously inhabited by the Indigenous peoples of the Americas since the 8th century. The original site of Natchez was developed as a major village with ceremonial platform mounds, built by people of the prehistoric Plaquemine culture, part of the influential Mississippian culture and active in this area from about 700 AD. Archaeological evidence shows they began construction of the three main earthwork mounds by 1200. Additional work was done in the mid-15th century.

By the late 17th and early 18th century, the Natchez people (pronounced "Nochi"), descendants of the Plaquemine culture, occupied the site. They used it as their major ceremonial center after leaving the area of Emerald Mound. They added to the mounds, including a residence for their chief, the "Great Sun", on Mound B, and a combined temple and charnel house for the elite on Mound C.

Many early European explorers, including Hernando de Soto, La Salle and Bienville, made contact with the Natchez at this site, called the Grand Village of the Natchez. Their accounts described the society and village.

The most thorough account was written by the French colonist Antoine-Simon Le Page du Pratz, who lived near the Natchez for several years, learning their language and befriending their leaders. He witnessed the 1725 funeral of the war chief, Tattooed Serpent (Serpent Piqué in French). The Natchez maintained a hierarchical society, divided into nobles and commoners, with people affiliated according to matrilineal descent. The paramount chief, known as the "Great Sun", owed his position to the rank of his mother. His next eldest brother served as Tattooed Serpent.

The 128-acre (0.52 km^{2}) site of the Grand Village of the Natchez is preserved as a National Historic Landmark; the Mississippi Department of Archives and History maintains it. The site includes a museum with artifacts from the mounds and village. A picnic pavilion and walking trails are also available on the grounds. Nearby Emerald Mound is also a National Historic Landmark of the Natchez and their ancestors.

== Colonial history (1716–1783) ==
In 1716, the French founded Fort Rosalie to protect the trading post, established two years earlier in the Natchez territory. French colonists subsequently expanded settlements and slave-based plantations into Indigenous Natchez territory, including areas of major cultural and political importance to the Natchez people. French colonists frequently clashed with the Natchez people as colonial expansion displaced Indigenous communities and intensified competition over land and resources. This was one of several Natchez settlements; others lay to the northeast. The Natchez tended to become increasingly divided into pro-French and pro-English factions; those farther from the French had more relations with English traders, who came to the area from the British colonies to the east.

After years of escalating colonial conflict and encroachment, the Natchez, together with the Chickasaw and Yazoo allies, launched a coordinated military campaign against French colonial forces in November 1729. European colonists referred to the conflict as the "Natchez War" or "Natchez Rebellion". Natchez fighters and their allies destroyed French colonial settlements in the region. On November 29, 1729, Natchez fighters killed 229 French colonists during the attack on the settlement: 138 men, 35 women, and 56 children (the largest death toll by an attack on settlers in Mississippi's history). They took most of the women and children as captives. French colonial forces, together with allied Indigenous nations, carried out repeated retaliatory campaigns against the Natchez over the next two years, resulting in mass killings, the enslavement of surviving Natchez people, and the forced displacement of many others. After surrender of the leader and several hundred Natchez in 1731, French authorities transported Natchez prisoners to New Orleans, where they sold them into chattel slavery and deported many to plantations in Saint-Domingue, as ordered by the French prime minister Maurepas.

Many of the Natchez who escaped enslavement sought refuge with the Creek and Cherokee peoples, ultimately being absorbed into their people. Descendants of the Natchez diaspora have reorganized and survive as the Natchez Nation, a treaty tribe and confederate of the federally recognized Muscogee (Creek) Nation, with a sovereign traditional government.

Following the Seven Years' War, in 1763, British authorities assumed control of Fort Rosalie and the surrounding settlement, which colonists had named after the Natchez people following their military defeat and displacement. The British Crown bestowed land grants in this territory to officers who had served with distinction in the war. These officers came mostly from the colonies of New York, New Jersey, and Pennsylvania. They established plantation estates dependent on enslaved labor and reproduced the hierarchical social order of the colonial Atlantic world. Before 1774, Lord Dartmouth who was Secretary of State for the Colonies and the previous First Lord of Trade, contemplated siting a civil government below Natchez at White Cliffs which would be the residence of a Lieutenant Governor reporting to Pensacola. Montfort Browne visited Natchez in 1769 while he was Lieutenant Governor of West Florida; he received a grant near Natchez. Bernard Romans' map Proposals dated August 5, 1773 from Philadelphia to likely subscribers indicated a purpose was to map the Mississippi River from Natchez to the mouth. During the 1760s and 1770s, the merchants of Natchez handled trade with Indigenous nations for other merchants such as McGillivrary & Struthers of Mobile and others. The Provincial Council ordered the authorities of West Florida to lay out a town at the Natchez on the reserved land on February 27, 1776. On February 16, 1779, British authorities in London received several petitions from West Florida proprietors, merchants, and settlers to grant local courts at Natchez, encourage commerce, and make land grant reforms. In 1792, planters complained to the Spanish authorities that their produce was not properly priced by the town's merchants, to which the merchants responded by pamphlet, inviting the planters to treat with Peter Walker at the landing or with Alexander Moore at his plantation.

The Spanish commander, Juan de la Villebreuvre, on September 7, 1779, conquered Fort Bute; later, the garrison at Baton Rouge and Natchez's Fort Panmure to establish Spanish colonial rule, but a Natchez loyalist militia forced him to surrender Fort Panmure in May 1781. A few days later, Pensacola was lost by the British, and the Natchez revolt collapsed. After defeat in the American Revolutionary War, Great Britain ceded the territory to the United States under the terms of the Treaty of Paris (1783). Spain was not a party to the treaty, despite having seized Natchez militarily from British control during the war. Although Spain had been allied with the American colonists, it was more interested in advancing its power at Britain's expense. Once the war was over, they were not inclined to give up that which they had acquired by force.

In 1797, U.S. Major Andrew Ellicott raised the United States flag over Natchez as the federal government asserted United States control over lands east of the Mississippi River, above the 31st parallel, which had previously been governed by Spain and long inhabited by Indigenous peoples.

A 1784 census of the Natchez District recorded 1,619 residents, 498 of whom were enslaved Black people held in bondage under the plantation economy.

== Antebellum (1783–1860) ==
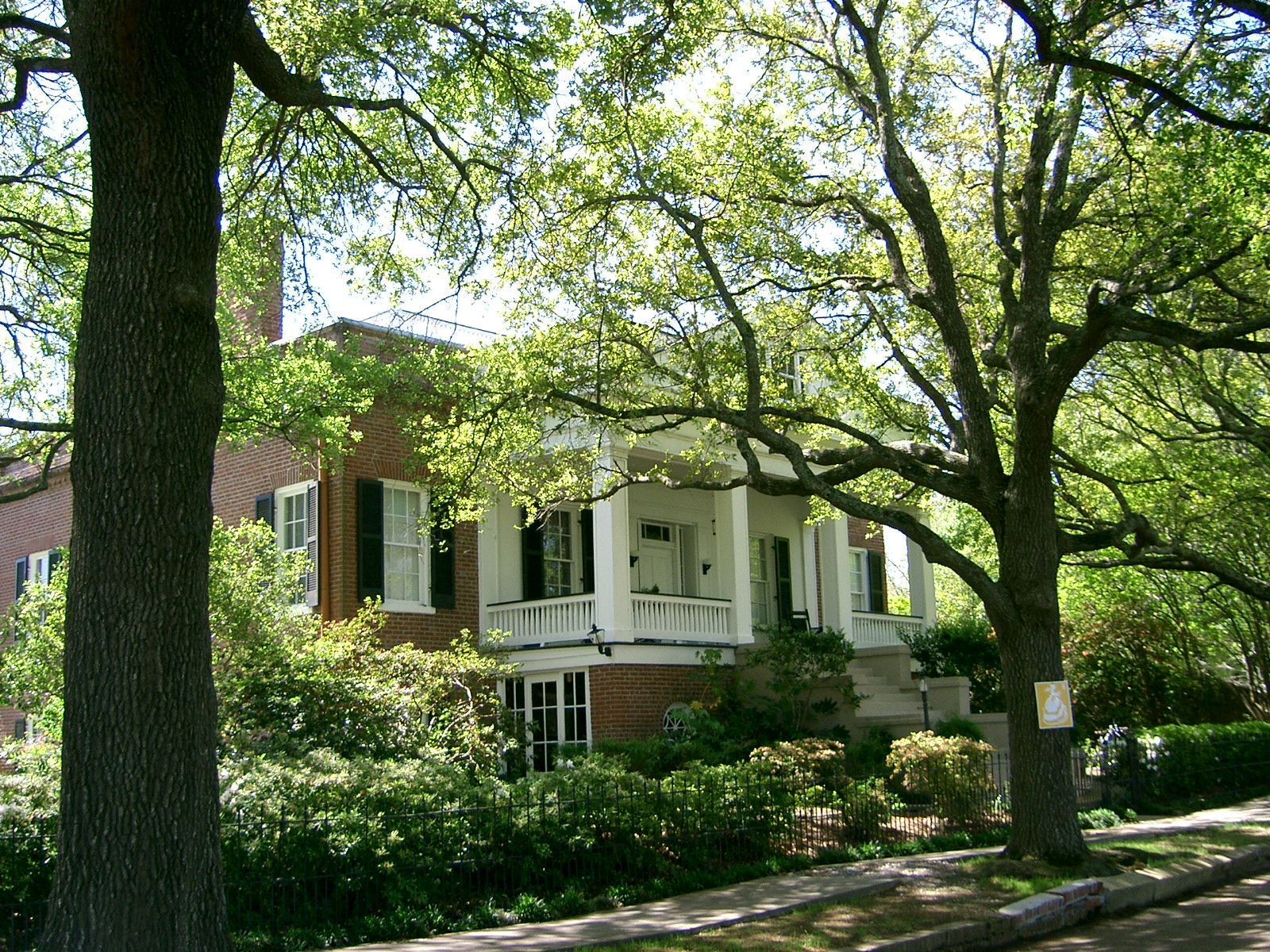
"The Parsonage", a surviving antebellum residence, was constructed in Natchez in 1852.

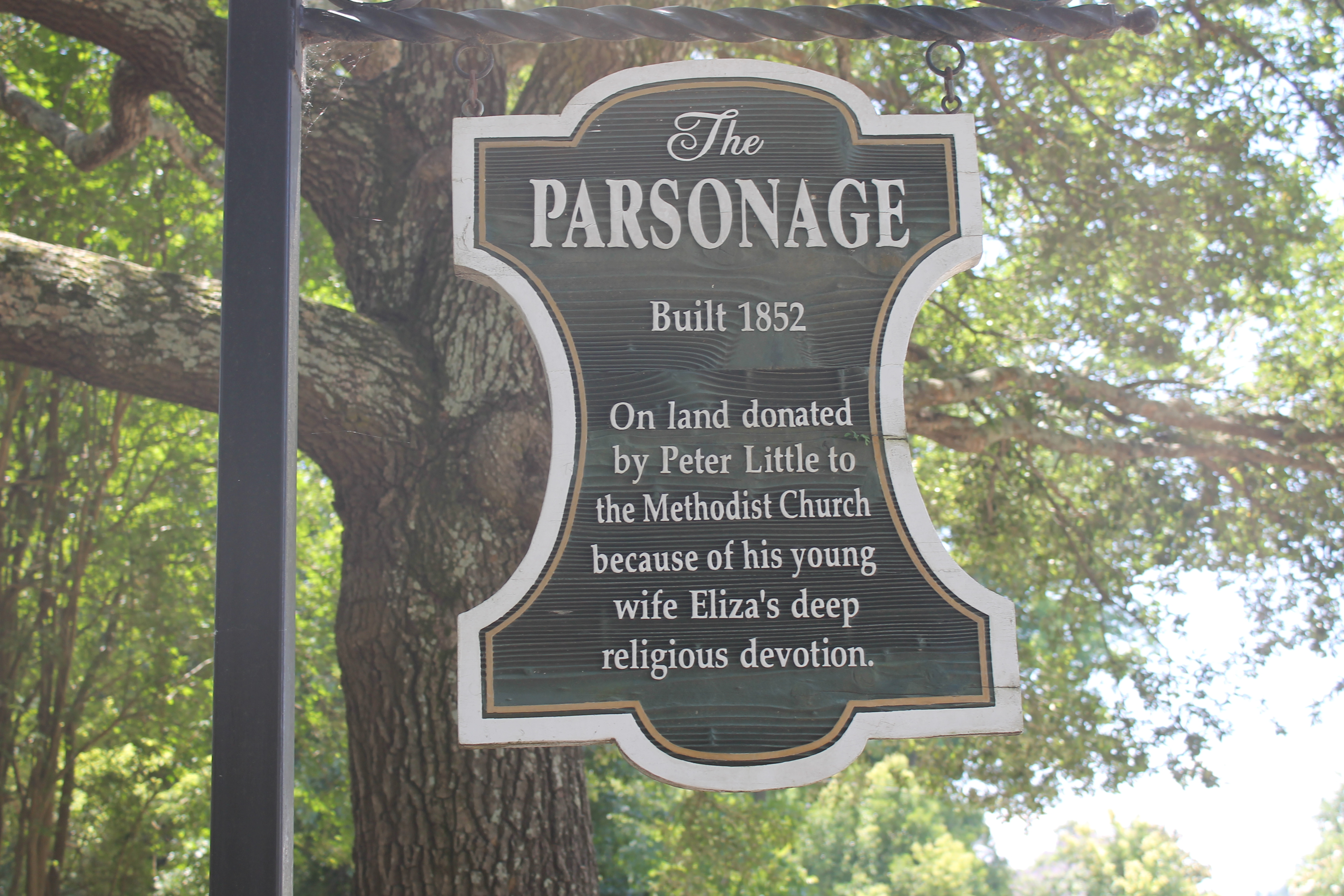
The Parsonage was constructed by Peter Little in honor of his wife, Eliza, a dedicated Methodist.

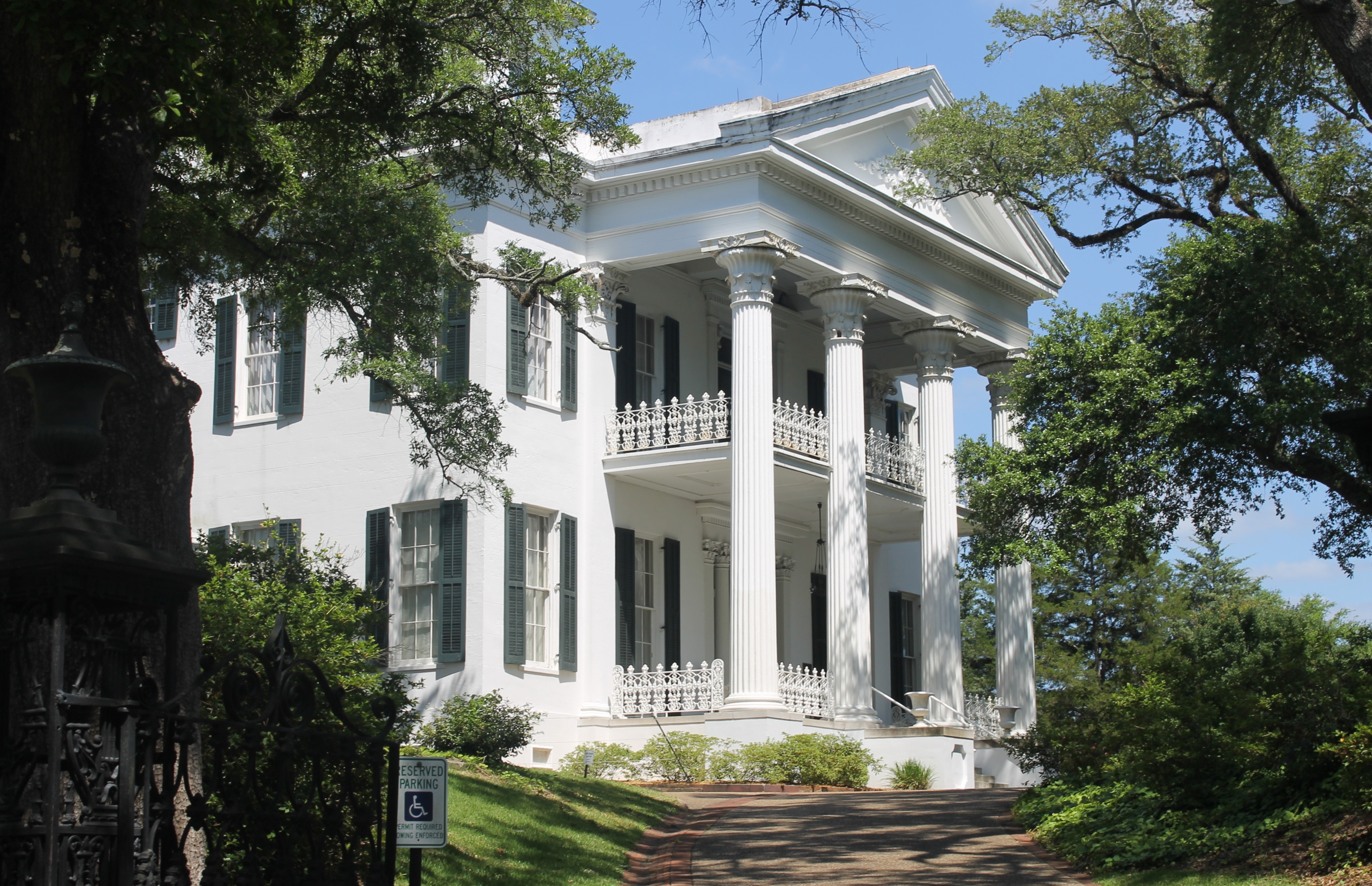
Another surviving plantation-era mansion in Natchez is Stanton Hall, built c. 1858 and located on a whole city block at 401 High Street.

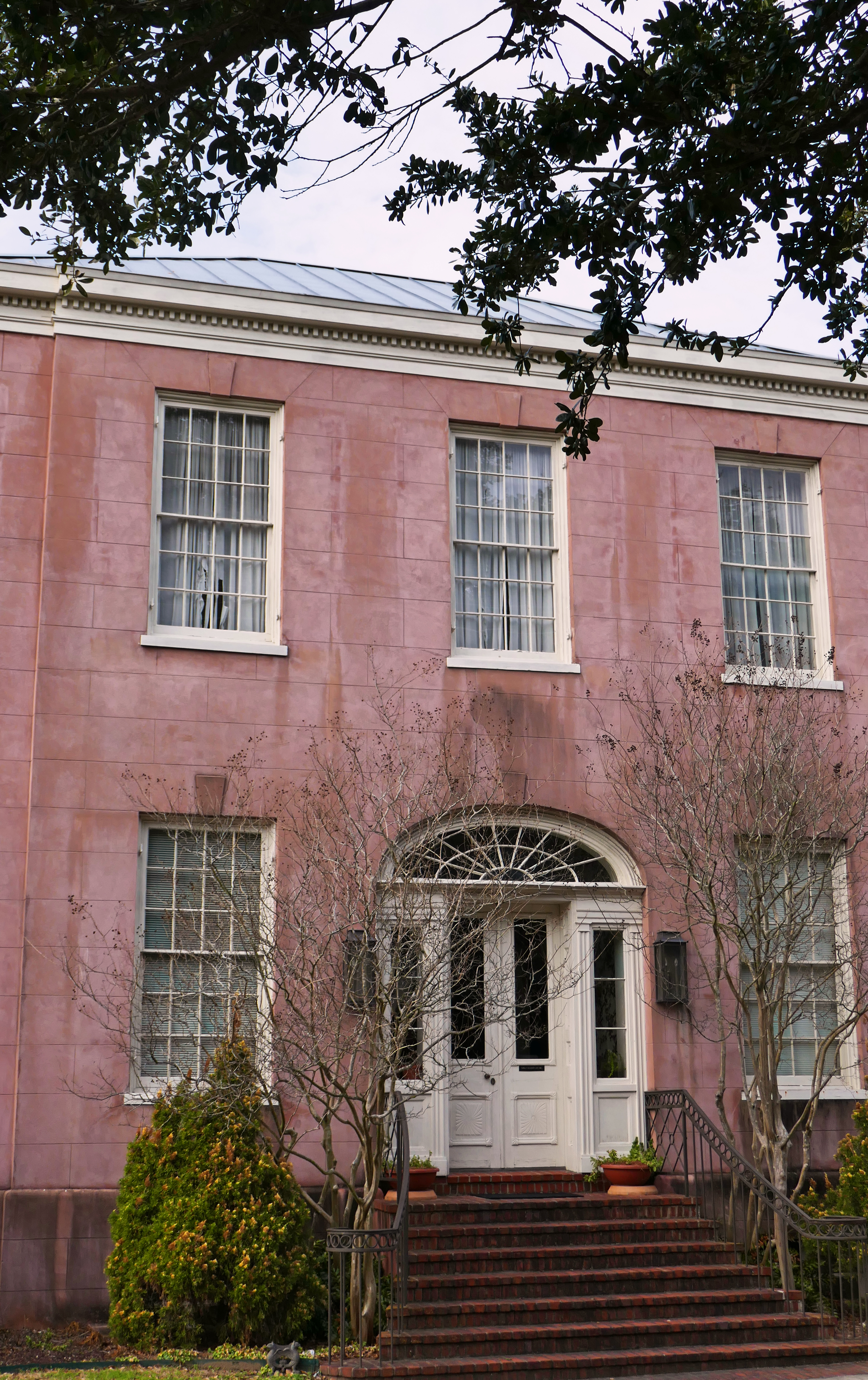
Federal-style house at State and Wall streets, Natchez MS. C. 1820.

In the late 18th century, Natchez was the starting point of the Natchez Trace overland route, an Indigenous trade and travel route that likely incorporated older buffalo migration paths which ran from Natchez to Nashville through what are now Mississippi, Alabama, and Tennessee. Produce and goods were transported on the Mississippi River by the flatboatmen and keelboatmen, who usually sold their wares at Natchez or New Orleans, including their boats (as lumber). A Mississippi River navigation guide published in 1817 stated, "The Natchez landing affords a pretty safe harbor for boats, it being in the shape of a half moon. The wind seldom disturb it unless indeed very high, and not then to any damage if care be taken to fasten well and keep the boat easy and evenly afloat." The boatmen made the long trek back north to their homes overland on the Natchez Trace. Residents referred to many of the boatmen as 'Kaintucks' because large numbers came from Kentucky and the broader Ohio River Valley. The Trace was traveled heavily until the development of steamboats in the 1820s allowed northward navigation (against the current) on the river.

On June 30, 1785 the Natchez district was in political upheaval when William Davenport of Georgia presented himself as a commissioner authorized by that state to survey the boundaries of a nascent county called Bourbon County, call for elections for state representatives to the Georgia Assembly, organize military units and give oaths to other officials. The Spanish authorities had news of such preparations from locals, but were on military alert.

By royal order, the Roman Catholic church purchased 300 arpents square near the fort from Richard Carpenter on April 11, 1788.

On October 27, 1795, the U.S. and Spain signed the Treaty of San Lorenzo, settling their decade-long boundary dispute. All Spanish claims to Natchez were formally surrendered to the United States. More than two years passed before official orders reached the Spanish garrison there. In early 1797, the Treasury Department sent $2,200 worth of supplies to Natchez through New Orleans merchant Robert Cochran. Spanish authorities exercised strict regulations for commerce and the development of the streets, lots, and bluff, but surrendered the fort and possession of the Town of Natchez to United States forces led by Captain Isaac Guion on March 30, 1798.

A week later, the Adams administration named Natchez the first capital of the new Mississippi Territory, a U.S. territorial government established amid accelerating settler expansion into Indigenous lands. On March 10, 1803, the territorial assembly incorporated the town. After it served for several years as the territorial capital, the territory built a new capital, named Washington, 6 miles (10 km) to the east, also in Adams County. After roughly 15 years, the legislature transferred the capital back to Natchez at the end of 1817, when the territory was admitted as a state. Later, the capital was returned to Washington. As the state's population center shifted to the north and east with more settlers entering the area, the legislature voted to move the capital to the more centrally located city of Jackson in 1822. In 1830, the population of Natchez was 2,789. Samuel Cotton, the Natchez harbor master, reported collection from 383 steamships, 10 keelboats, and 868 flatboats for the year 1829. Like other river towns, Natchez was a destination for gamblers.

Throughout the early nineteenth century, Natchez became one of the principal commercial centers of Mississippi's slavery-dependent cotton economy. Its strategic location on the high bluffs on the eastern bank of the Mississippi River enabled it to develop into a bustling port. At Natchez, many enslavers and plantation operators shipped cotton produced through enslaved labor onto steamboats at the landing known as Natchez Under-the-Hill to be transported downriver to New Orleans or, sometimes, upriver to St. Louis or Cincinnati. Cotton cultivated by enslaved African Americans was sold and shipped to New England, New York, and European spinning and textile mills.

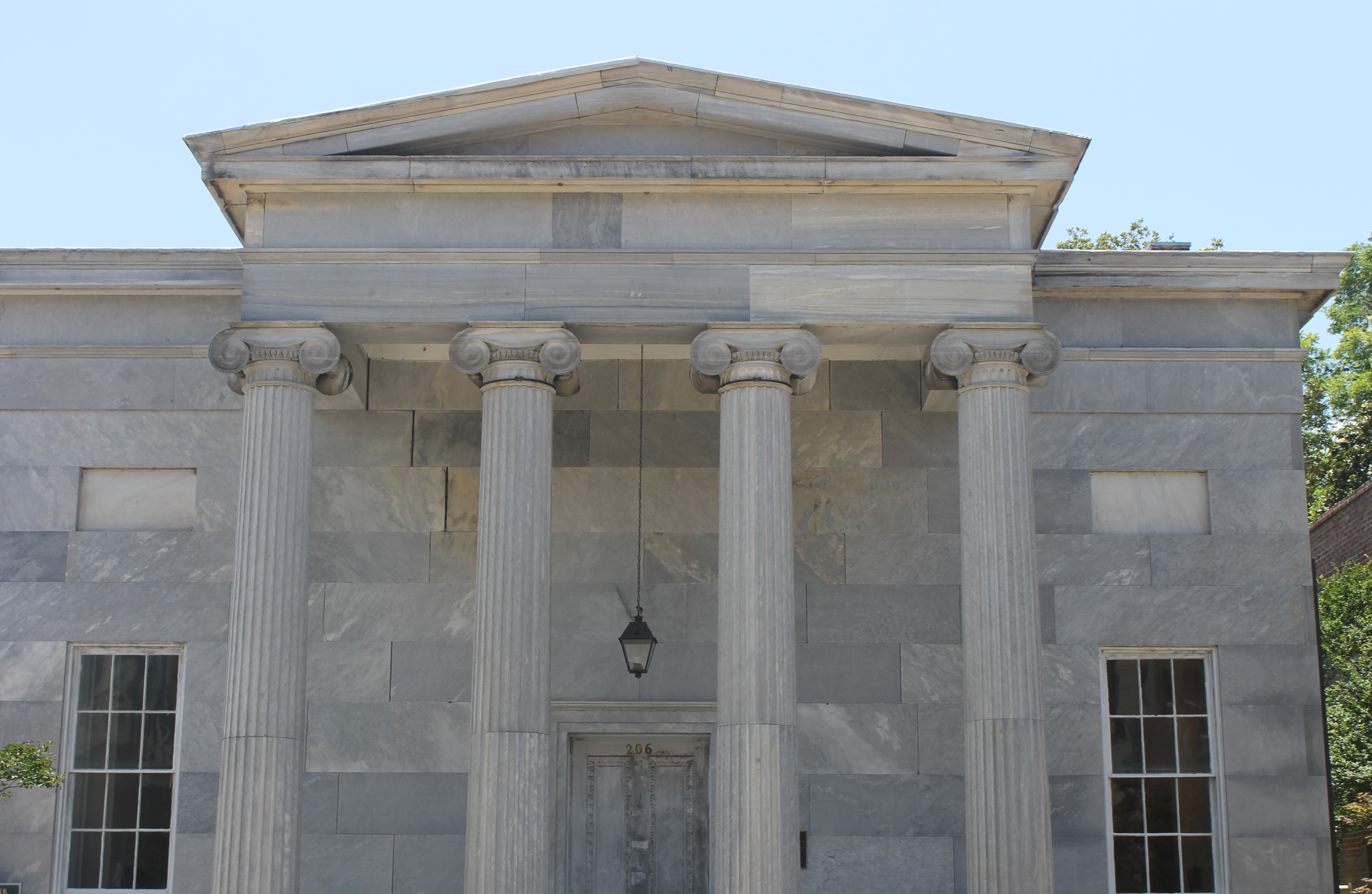
Commercial Bank in downtown Natchez, established in 1836, is built in the Greek Revival style of architecture. The banker lived in a house to the rear of the structure. The building is listed on the National Register of Historic Places.

The Natchez District, along with the Sea Islands of South Carolina and Georgia, became an early center of large-scale cotton cultivation built on enslaved labor. Until new hybridized breeds of short-staple cotton were created in the early nineteenth century, it was unprofitable to grow cotton in the United States anywhere other than those two areas. Although South Carolina had previously dominated the plantation-based cotton economy in the eighteenth century and early in the Antebellum South, it was the Natchez District that first experimented with hybridization, making the cotton boom possible. Historians attribute most of the expansion of cotton in the Deep South to Eli Whitney's development of the cotton gin; it lowered processing costs for short-staple cotton, making cultivation profitable. It was the kind of cotton that could be grown on uplands and throughout the Black Belt of the Deep South. The rapid expansion of cotton plantations intensified the domestic slave trade and increased demand for enslaved labor. They were sold in the domestic slave trade chiefly from the Upper South.

The expansion of the cotton economy drew increasing numbers of white settlers into Choctaw lands, who competed with the Choctaw for their land. Even after coerced land cessions, the settlers continued to encroach on Choctaw territory, leading to conflict. With the election of President Andrew Jackson in 1828, he pressed for Indian removal, gaining Congressional passage of an act authorizing that in 1830. Beginning with the Choctaw, the federal government forcibly removed Southeastern Indigenous nations in 1831 to lands west of the Mississippi River in Indian Territory. Nearly 15,000 Choctaw people were displaced from their homeland over the next two years.

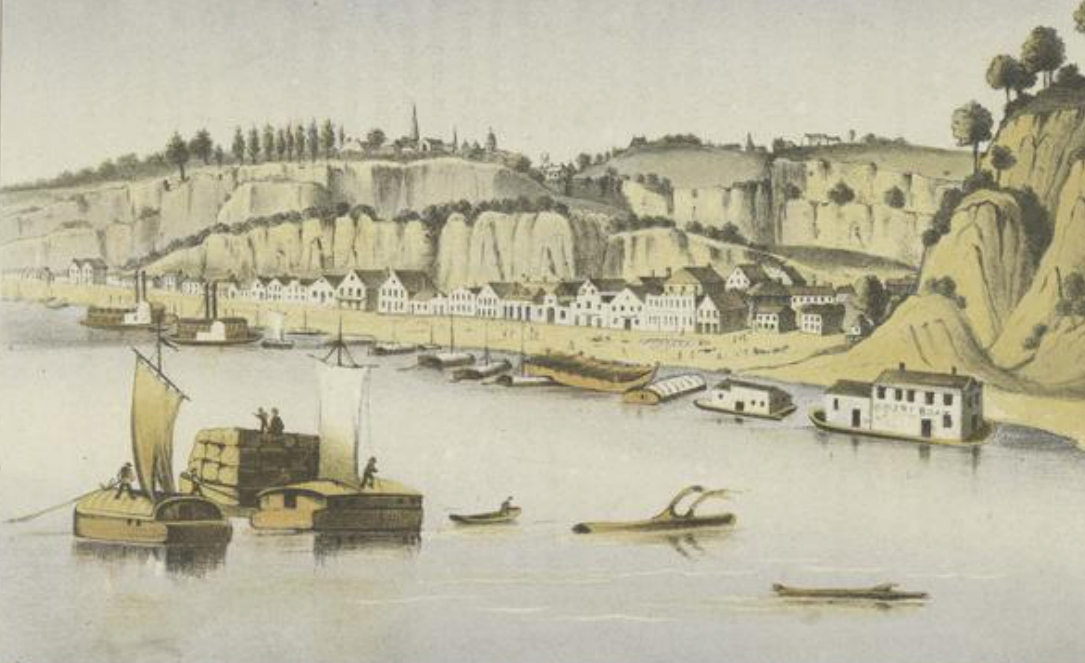
Natchez in the 1850s

The terrain around Natchez on the Mississippi River's bank is hilly. The city sits on a high bluff above the Mississippi River; to reach the riverbank, one must travel down a steep road to the landing called Silver Street, which is in marked contrast to the flat "delta" lowland found across the river surrounding the city of Vidalia, Louisiana. Wealthy enslavers built numerous mansions and estates using profits generated through slavery and cotton cultivation. Many owned plantations in Louisiana but chose to locate their homes on the higher ground in Mississippi. Before the American Civil War, Natchez concentrated extraordinary wealth derived from slavery among its planter class, with more millionaires than any other city in the United States. It was frequented by notables such as Aaron Burr, Henry Clay, Andrew Jackson, Zachary Taylor, Ulysses S. Grant, Jefferson Davis, Winfield Scott, and John James Audubon. Today, Natchez preserves an unusually large number of antebellum structures associated with the plantation economy and slavery; unlike many Southern cities, Natchez experienced comparatively limited wartime destruction during the Civil War.

The Forks of the Road Market had the highest volume of slave sales in Natchez, and Natchez had the most active slave trading market in Mississippi. The forced sale of enslaved people became a major source of local wealth and commercial activity. The market, at the intersection of Liberty Street and what was then Washington Street, became especially important after the slave traders Isaac Franklin of Tennessee and John Armfield of Virginia purchased the land in 1823. Tens of thousands of enslaved African Americans were trafficked through the market, transported from Virginia and the Upper South (many by walking overland), and destined for the plantations in the Deep South. In one of the largest internal forced migrations in U.S. history, more than one million enslaved Black American were taken from their families and moved southward. All trading at the market ceased by the summer of 1863, when Union troops occupied Natchez.

Before 1845 and the founding of the Natchez Institute, the city's wealthy white residents were the only ones who could afford a formal education for their children. Although many parents did not have much schooling themselves, they were anxious to provide their children with a quality education. Schools opened in the city as early as 1801, but many of the wealthiest families continued to rely on private tutors or out-of-state institutions, some sending their children as far as England and Scotland. The city founded the Natchez Institute to provide free education to white residents who were excluded from private schools. Although children from a variety of economic backgrounds could obtain an education, class differences persisted among students, particularly in terms of school choice and social ties. Although it was considered illegal, some enslaved Black children were clandestinely taught the alphabet and how to read the Bible by their white playmates in private homes.

Natchez also has a unique history as a region with a substantial number of free people of color (the legal term used at the time) during the era of slavery. Census records from 1850 and 1860 show that about 85% of the free people of color in the antebellum era were people categorized in census records as 'mulatto', a historical racial classification used at the time for people of mixed African and European ancestry; these were often the children of enslaved Black women who were raped by their white male enslavers. Some mixed-race free people of color in Natchez acquired wealth in several ways. Very often, their planter-white male fathers gave them inheritances, or their half-family members set them up in business. Some of the leading free people of color within the Natchez community include such figures as William Johnson, Robert W. Fitzhugh, William McCary and Louis Winston. Robert H. Wood, was another prominent free person of color. He became the mayor of Natchez, the same position his white planter father, Robert Wood, had held years earlier. Earlier historical interpretations often overstated the legal and economic rights exercised by some wealthy free people of color in Natchez. Nevertheless, scholarship using court and government records has shown that some wealthy property-owning free people of color exercised substantial legal and economic autonomy despite pervasive racial discrimination. Owning wealth and receiving conditional social acceptance within parts of the white planter class in the antebellum era gave the few people of color who had this circumstance a limited and highly exceptional degree of social influence. William Johnson, a well-known free person of color, strove to be recognized within some elite social and economic circles as a planter; Archie P. Williams a free person of color who was also of Natchez was recognized in society as a planter due to being the son of David Percy Williams of Natchez and inheriting a large portion of his wealth. Archie P. Williams's white side of his family lineage had been among the wealthiest in the region for several generations, beginning in the 1760s with his great-grandfather, David Williams. Archie P. Williams was one of a few millionaires (especially mixed -race or black millionaires) in the 1800s due to his inherited share of the multi million dollar estate of Winthrop Sargent who was a stepfather to his grandfather. Other free people of color worked as artisans, mechanics, and tradespeople, occupying an intermediate and precarious social position between white residents and the enslaved Black majority. Some descendants of antebellum free people of color remain active in business and civic life in the Natchez region. The descendants of Robert Wood own the Mackel Funeral Home. Anton R. Williams of Kalamazoo and Grand Rapids, Michigan inherited wealth as a descendant of Archie P. Williams and continues to operate various oil and gas, real estate and timber land business ownership interest in Natchez, Mississippi and the surrounding region from his headquarters of Grand Rapids, Michigan and Kalamazoo, Michigan.

By 1859, Natchez exported roughly 50,000 bales of cotton annually, reflecting the scale of the region's slavery-dependent economy.

== American Civil War (1861–1865) ==
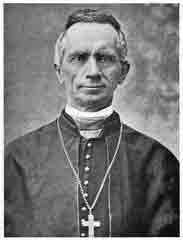
William Henry Elder, Bishop of Natchez

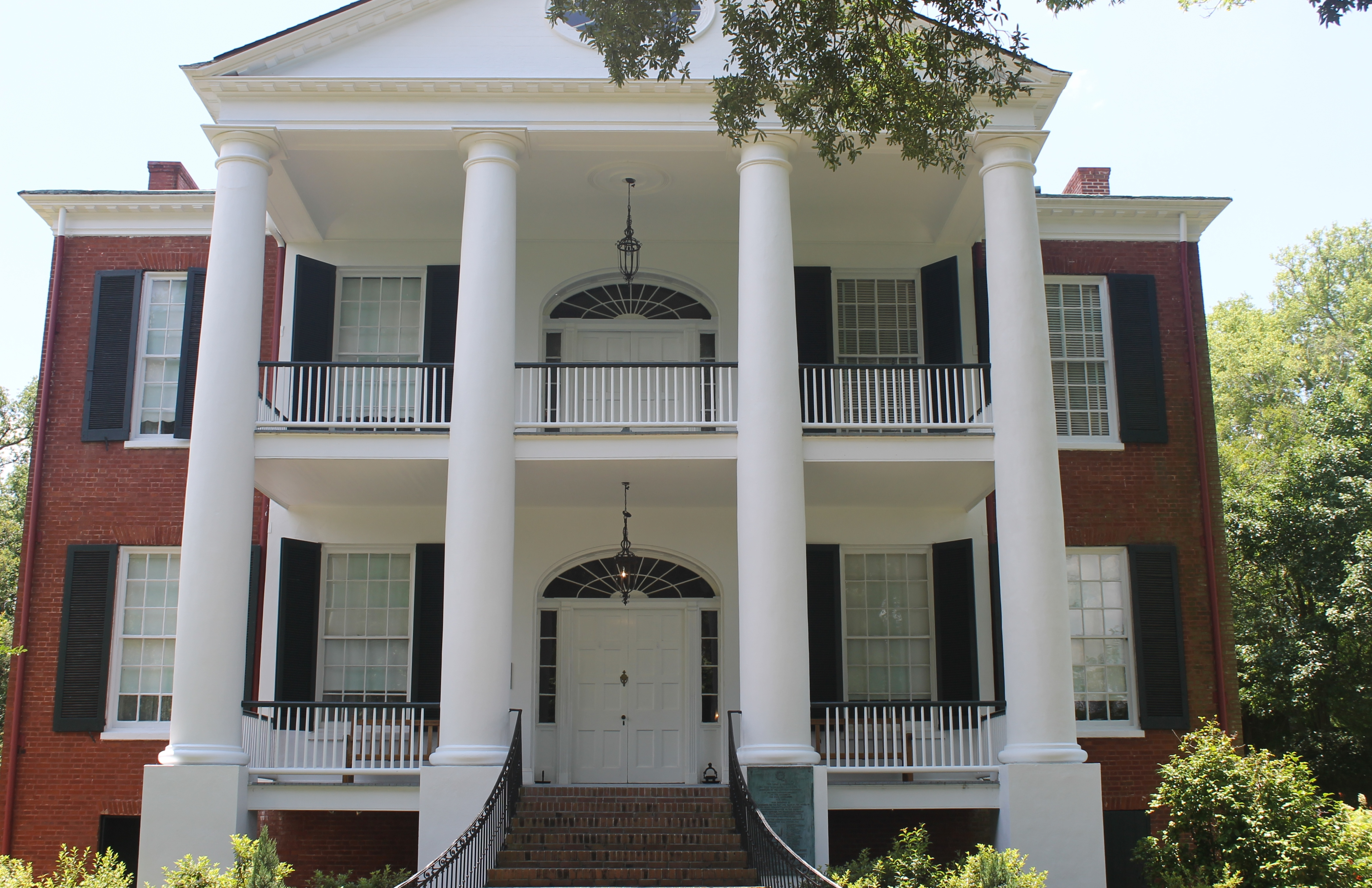
Union Army forces under U.S. Grant occupied Rosalie Mansion in Natchez after the Battle of Vicksburg in 1863.

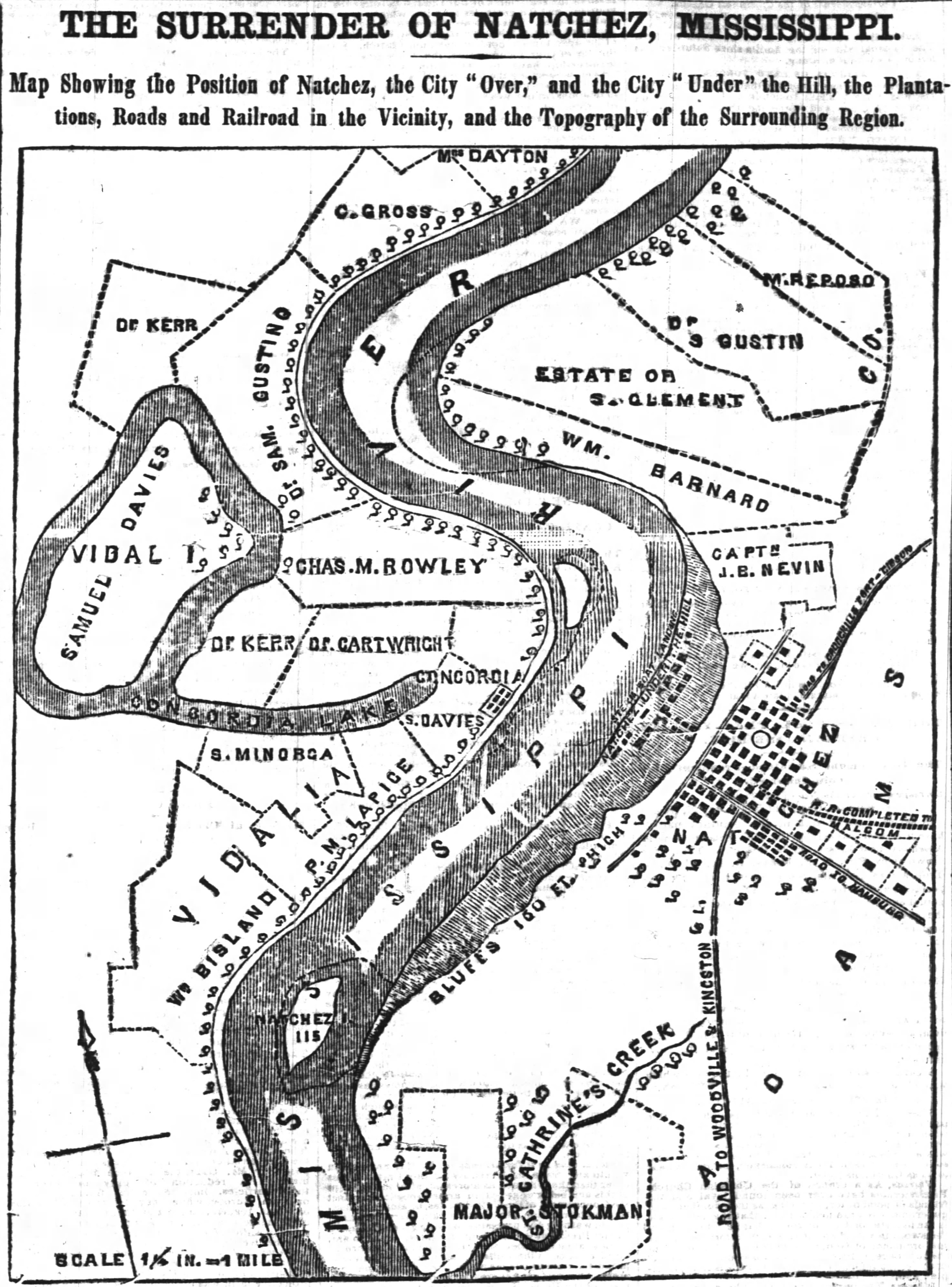
Map of Natchez, Mississippi, United States in May 1862; the "road to Hamburg" may have been a route between the slave markets at Forks of the Road and Hamburg, South Carolina

During the Civil War, Natchez experienced comparatively limited physical destruction relative to many Confederate-occupied cities. After the capture of New Orleans in May 1862, Natchez surrendered to Union naval forces under U.S. Admiral David Farragut. Two civilians, an older man and eight-year-old Rosalie Beekman, were killed during the Union shelling of the town. The man died of a heart attack, and a shell fragment killed Rosalie. Union Army soldiers under Ulysses S. Grant occupied Natchez in 1863; Grant set up his temporary headquarters in the Rosalie Mansion.

Some white Natchez residents remained hostile toward Union soldiers and federal authority. In 1864, William Henry Elder, the Catholic bishop of the Diocese of Natchez, refused to comply with a federal order requiring public prayers for the President of the United States. U.S. officials arrested Elder, jailed him briefly, and expelled him across the river into Confederate-controlled territory at Vidalia. Elder was eventually allowed to return to Natchez and resume his clerical duties there. He served until 1880, when he was elevated to Archbishop of Cincinnati.

Ellen Shields's memoir documents the perspective of an elite white Southern woman living with Union military occupation. Shields' memoir portrays the disruption of slaveholding Southern society during the war. Because many white planters had fled the city, many white women navigated Union occupation through performances of class status, gender expectations, and social influence.

Not all slaveholding planters in the Natchez region strongly supported the Confederacy. Those less supportive of secession were often recent migrants to the Southern United States, men who opposed secession, and individuals with economic and familial ties to the Northern United States. Many of these enslavers had weaker political and cultural identification with Southern nationalism, but even so, many members of their families joined in Confederate military attacks against the United States. Charles Dahlgren was among the recent migrants; from Philadelphia, he had made his fortune before the war. He supported the Confederacy and led a brigade, but failed to prevent the U.S. Navy from restoring control over the Gulf Coast. When Union forces occupied the region, he fled to Georgia for the duration of the war. He returned in 1865 but never recouped his fortune. He had to declare bankruptcy, and in 1870, he gave up and moved to New York City.

Following the Union victory at the Battle of Vicksburg in July 1863, many refugees, including formerly enslaved African Americans emancipated under the Emancipation Proclamation, began moving into Natchez and the surrounding countryside. Union Army officials reported severe shortages of food, shelter, and medical resources. The Army planned to address the situation with a mixture of paid labor for formerly enslaved people on government-leased plantations, the recruitment of able-bodied Black men into the Union Army, and the establishment of refugee camps where displaced formerly enslaved people could receive food, shelter, and limited educational opportunities. However, as the war continued, the policy was inconsistently implemented and frequently failed to meet refugees' needs, and many of the leased plantations suffered from mismanagement, Confederate violence, and continuing wartime instability. Hundreds of people in and around Natchez—especially refugees and formerly enslaved people—died from hunger, disease, exposure, or wartime violence during this period.

During the war, both Union and Confederate observers nicknamed Natchez 'Tradyville' because of its extensive contraband trade.

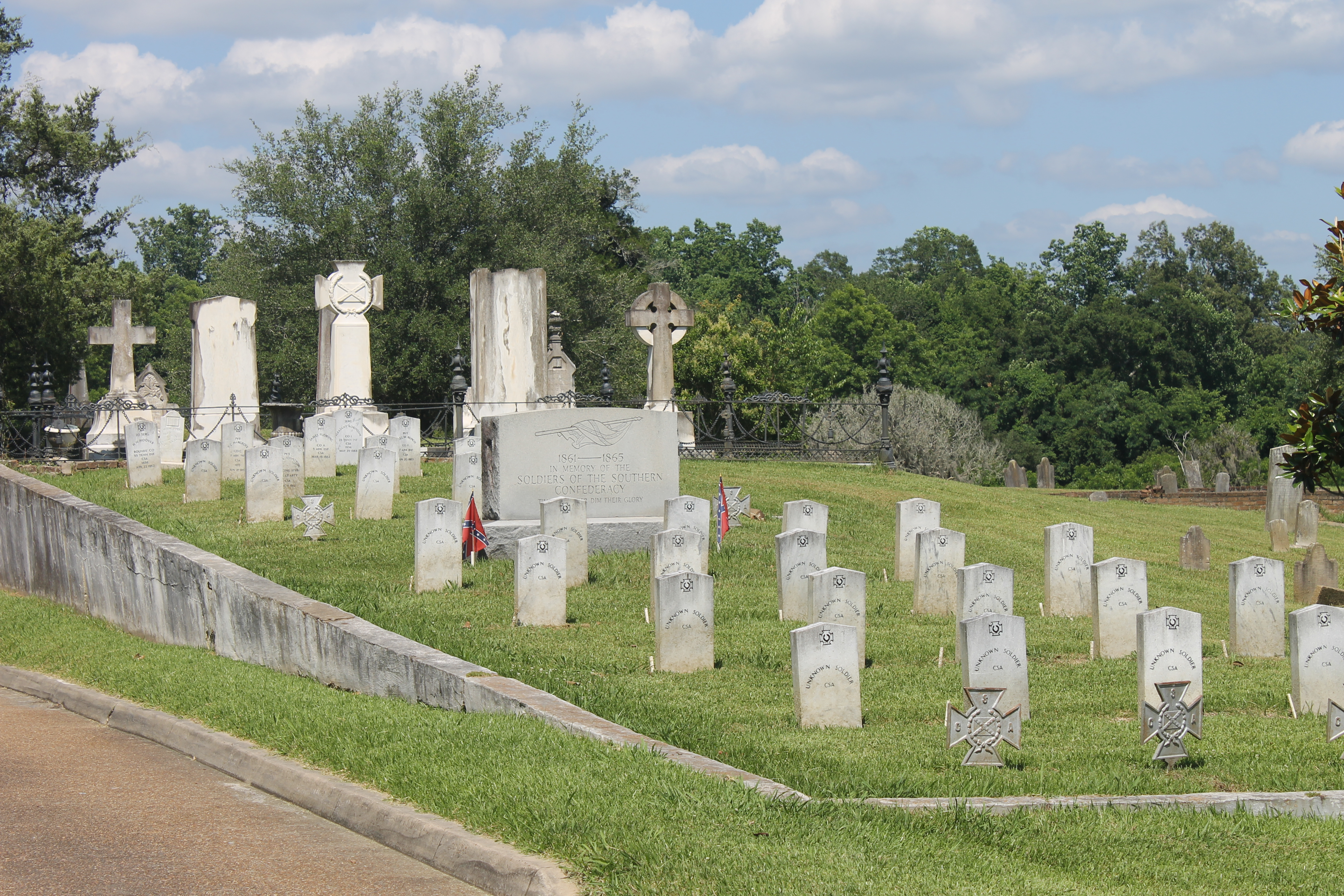
Confederate graves in a portion of the Natchez City Cemetery

After the war, many white Natchez residents embraced increasingly pro-Confederate political and cultural identities. The Lost Cause ideology emerged after the war as a revisionist interpretation that attempted to minimize slavery's central role in the conflict and portray the Confederacy as honorable and victimized. It became a dominant public memory framework across much of the white South, reinforced through commemorations, speeches, monuments, veterans' organizations, and school curricula. Organizations such as the United Daughters of the Confederacy and United Confederate Veterans played major roles in promoting Lost Cause interpretations of the Civil War. In Natchez and other cities, although the local newspapers and war veterans played a role in the maintenance of the Lost Cause, wealthy white women played a central role in shaping Confederate memory culture—especially in establishing cemeteries and memorials, such as the Civil War monument dedicated on Memorial Day 1890. Lost Cause ideology also allowed many white Southern civilians to claim symbolic participation in Confederate sacrifice and identity after the war.

== Postwar period (1865–1900) ==
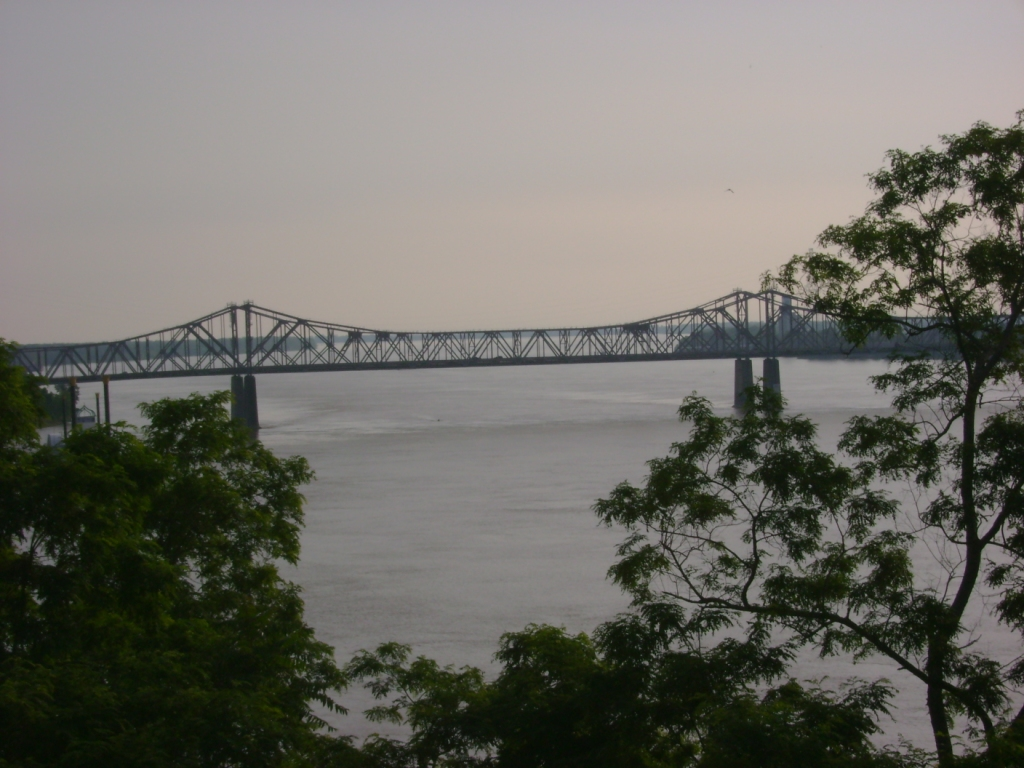
Natchez–Vidalia Bridge over the Mississippi River

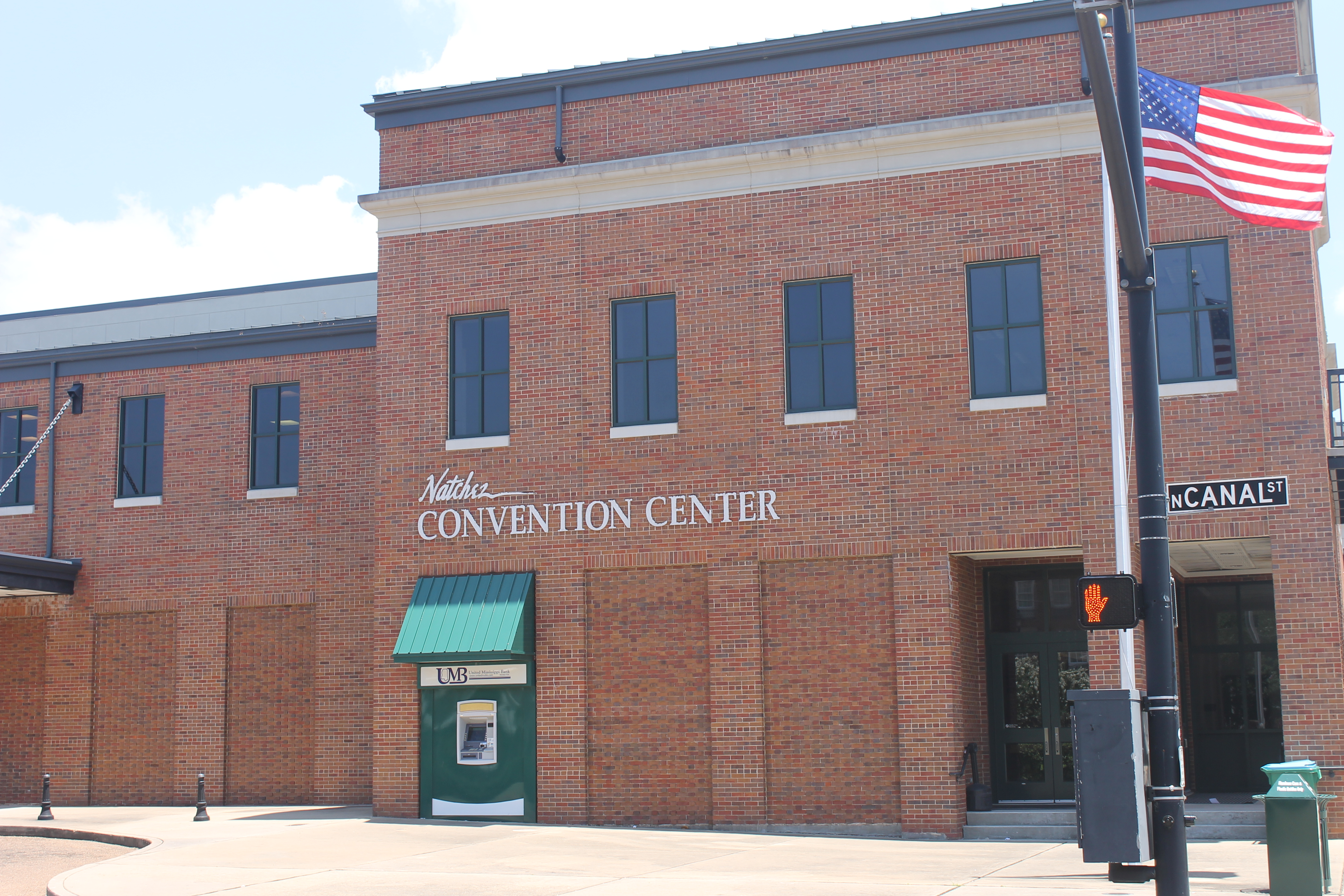
Natchez Convention Center is across from the Grand Hotel.

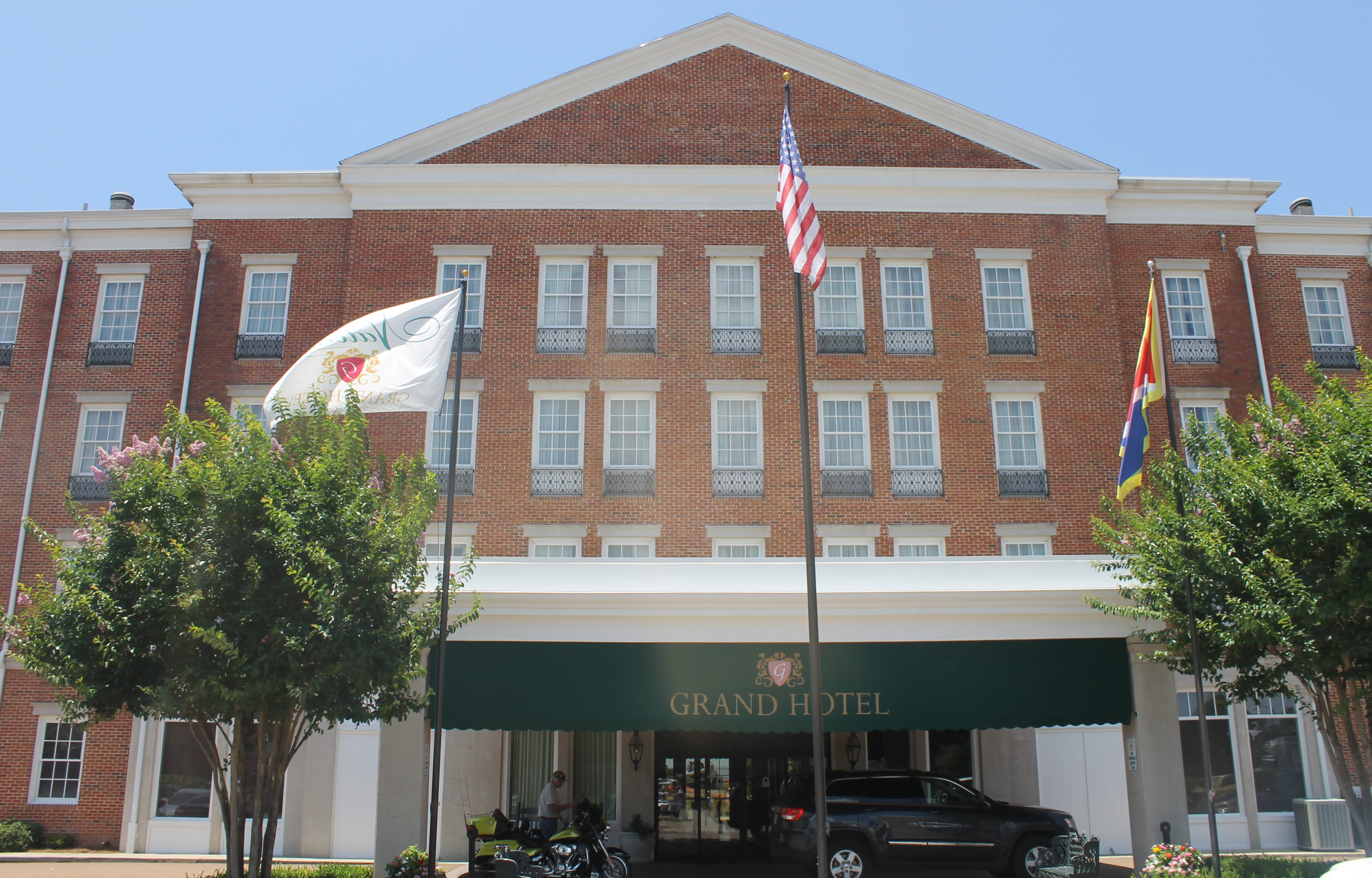
Grand Hotel in downtown Natchez

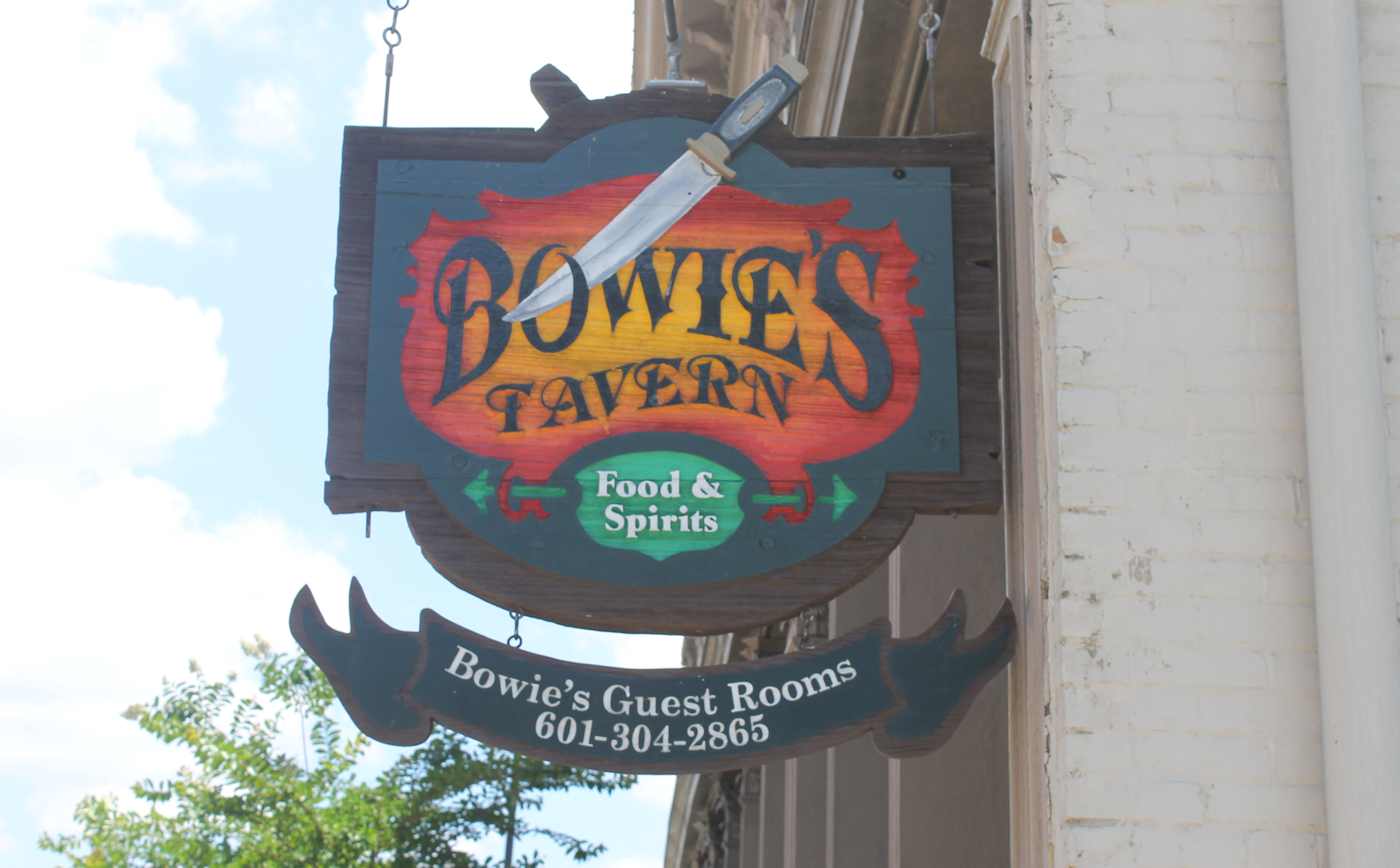
Bowie's Tavern at 84 Homochitto Street in downtown Natchez

Natchez experienced a relatively rapid economic recovery after the Civil War, as commercial shipping traffic on the Mississippi River resumed. Cotton remained the region's dominant cash crop, but the plantation gang system, formerly based on slavery, was partially replaced by sharecropping and tenant farming, systems that offered formerly enslaved people limited autonomy while often trapping them in cycles of debt and economic dependency. In many Black families, women sought to leave plantation field labor to focus on childcare, family stability, and household autonomy. Economic hardship and widespread racism nevertheless forced many Black women into low-paid domestic labor in white households.

In addition to cotton, local industries, including logging, contributed to the city's export economy through its wharf. Natchez imported increasing quantities of manufactured goods from northern industrial cities such as Cincinnati, Pittsburgh, and St. Louis.

Natchez's importance in nineteenth-century Mississippi River commerce was reflected in the naming of nine steamboats Natchez, which traveled the lower river between 1823 and 1918. Many were built for and commanded by steamboat captain Thomas P. Leathers, whom Jefferson Davis reportedly considered for command of Confederate naval forces on the Mississippi River. (This appointment was never concluded.) In 1885, the Anchor Line, known for operating upscale passenger steamboats between St. Louis and New Orleans, launched the City of Natchez, a steamboat heavily promoted for speed and luxury. This ship operated for a year before it was lost in a fire in Cairo, Illinois, on 28 December 1886. Since 1975, an excursion steamboat at New Orleans has borne the name Natchez.

River commerce continued to support the city's economy until just after the turn of the twentieth century, when steamboat traffic began to be replaced by the railroads. The city's economy declined over the course of the 20th century, as did that of many Mississippi River towns bypassed by railroad traffic. In the twentieth century, tourism became an increasingly important sector of the local economy.

After the war and during the Reconstruction era, labor relations within white households changed following the abolition of slavery. After the Civil War, many domestic workers in white households were Black women. Many supported children and extended family members through domestic labor; although their wages were typically low, they were often essential to household survival. White employers attempted to preserve racial hierarchies and paternalistic social relationships inherited from slavery, exerting greater control over the labor of Black domestic workers because of racial inequality and economic vulnerability. White domestic employees more frequently held supervisory or specialized positions, such as governesses and gardeners; Black workers were disproportionately concentrated in lower-paid service roles, such as cooks, maids, and laundresses.

In 1871, Natchez established its first publicly funded coeducational school for African American students, the Union School.

== Since 1900 ==
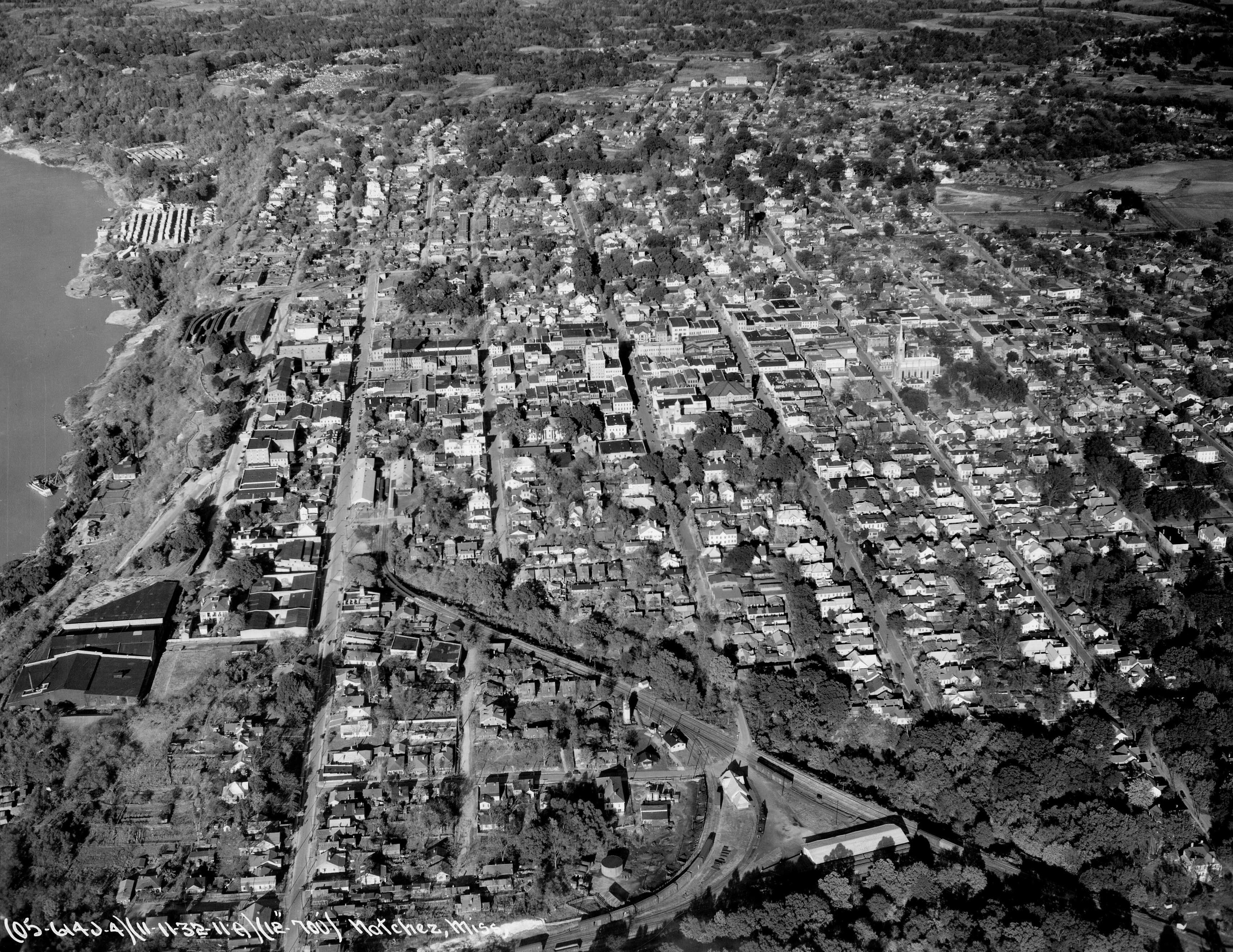
Aerial view of Downtown Natchez, 1932

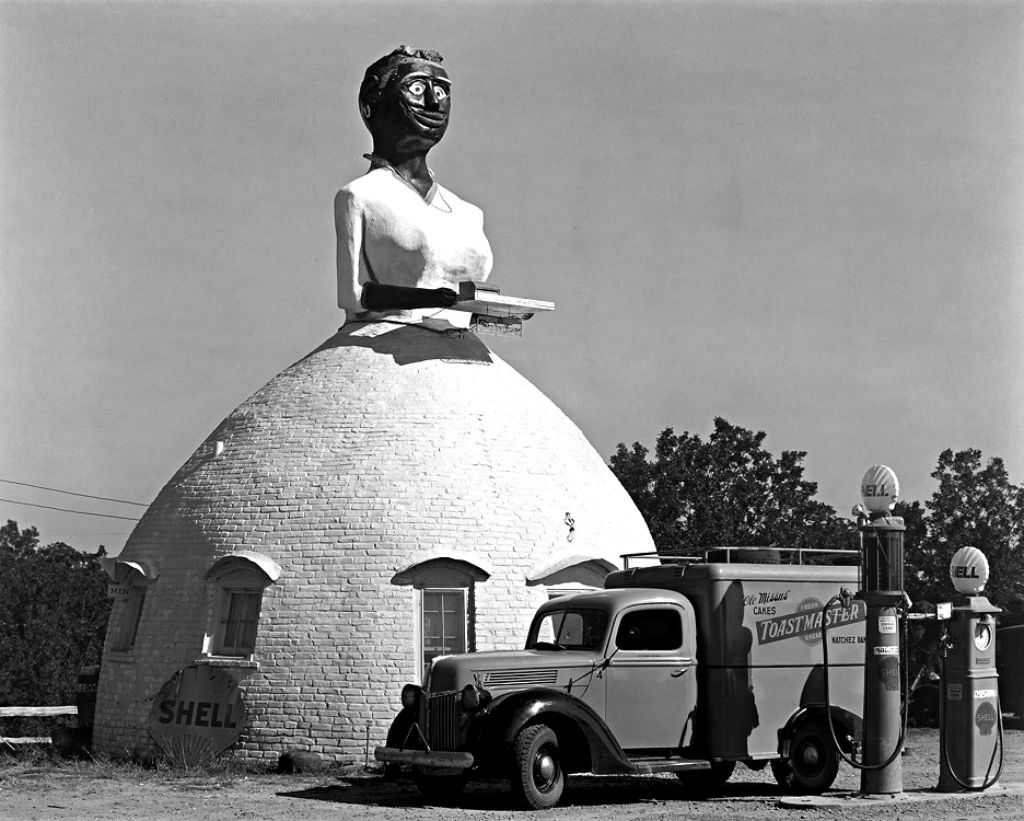
Mammy's Cupboard restaurant near Natchez, 1941

For a brief period, Stanton College in Natchez educated the daughters of wealthy white families, particularly those associated with the former enslaver class. It was located in Stanton Hall, built as a private mansion in 1858. In the early 20th century, the college became a space where daughters of families associated with the enslaver class interacted with those from newer commercial and professional backgrounds. The school also reflected generational tensions between socially conservative parents and increasingly modern-minded daughters. Students participated in social clubs and literary societies that reinforced networks of kinship, class identity, and social status among white families. Coursework emphasized etiquette, letter writing, and gendered expectations of respectability as well as skills intended to help economically declining white women support themselves while maintaining the appearance of upper-class social standing. Some students resisted strict dress codes and behavioral expectations, while also reproducing their parents' racial and class assumptions. Stanton Hall was designated as a National Historic Landmark in the late 20th century.

Natchez developed a significant nightlife and music culture along the Mississippi River, with Black musicians playing central roles in regional jazz and blues traditions despite segregation and racial inequality. On April 23, 1940, 209 people died in a fire at the Rhythm Night Club, a segregated Black dance hall in Natchez. Reflecting the racial attitudes of the Jim Crow era, a local newspaper wrote that "203 black bought 50 cent tickets to eternity". This fire has been noted as the fourth-deadliest fire in U.S. history. The tragedy later became the subject of several blues songs memorializing the victims and the disaster.

During the 1960s, industrial employers expanded operations in Natchez, bringing manufacturing jobs to the area. Among them was Armstrong Tire and Rubber Company. Many companies maintained discriminatory hiring and promotion practices consistent with broader patterns of racial segregation in the South, restricting many African American workers to lower-paying and lower-status positions. The National Association for the Advancement of Colored People (NAACP) challenged these discriminatory practices through activism and legal pressure.

== Civil Rights Era ==
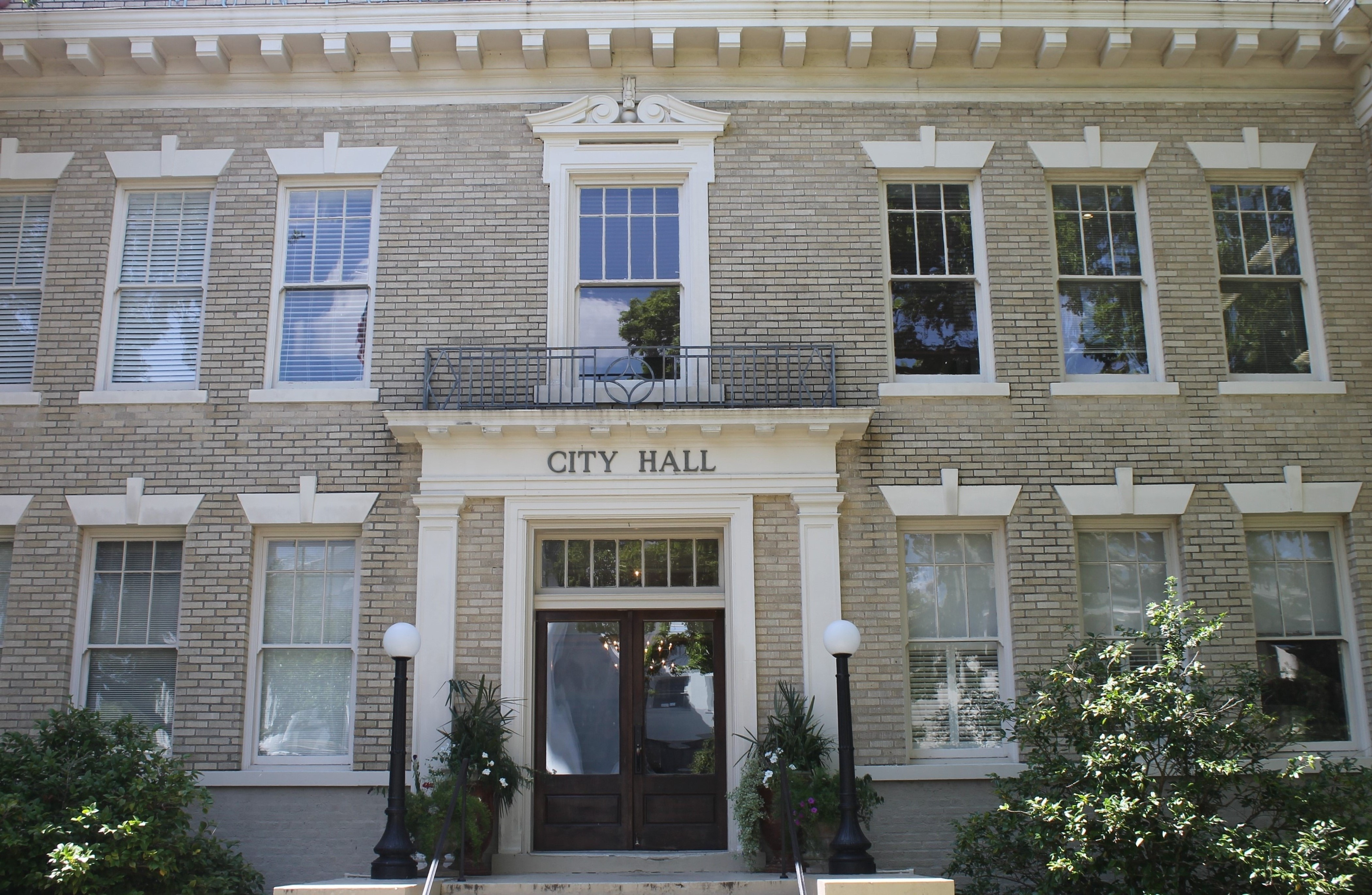
Natchez City Hall on South Pearl Street

In the early 1960s, as the civil rights movement achieved legal and political victories and James Meredith integrated the University of Mississippi as its first Black student, Natchez became a major center of Ku Klux Klan organizing and white supremacist violence opposing desegregation and civil rights. E. L. McDaniel, the Grand Dragon of the United Klans of America, then the largest Klan organization in the United States, had his office in Natchez at 114 Main Street. In August 1964, McDaniel established a klavern of the UKA in Natchez, operating publicly under the front organization name of the "Adams County Civic and Betterment Association".

Despite intimidation and threats from white supremacist groups, Forrest A. Johnson, Sr., a prominent white attorney in Natchez, publicly criticized Klan violence and white supremacist organizing. From 1964 through 1965, he published an alternative newspaper called the Miss-Lou Observer, in which he regularly challenged Klan activity and segregationist politics. Klan members and their allies organized an economic retaliation campaign against his law practice, nearly ruining him financially.

In his October 1964 report, A.E. Hopkins, an investigator for the Mississippi State Sovereignty Commission, a tax-supported organization that sponsored surveillance of residents, wrote that the Federal Bureau of Investigation (FBI) was in Adams County in force

because of the alleged burning of several churches in that area as well as several bombings and the whipping of several Negroes; also, because of the murder of two Negroes from Meadville whose bodies were recovered from the Mississippi river while the murders of three civil rights workers from Philadelphia was being investigated by Federal, State and local officials.

By that time, more than 100 FBI agents were in the area as part of the Philadelphia investigation; three civil rights workers were abducted and murdered by white supremacists; that summer, their bodies were discovered buried in an earthen dam.

The FBI increased its presence in an attempt to investigate and contain escalating white supremacist violence. Bill Williams, an FBI agent in Natchez for two years during that time, said in a 2005 interview that the "race wars in the area are 'a story never told'. He said that Natchez in 1964 had become the 'focal point for racial, anti-civil rights activity for the state for the next several years'." In May 1966, the Ku Klux Klan held a large public rally at Liberty Ball Park featuring speakers such as Imperial Wizard Robert M. Shelton, as well as leaders from out-of-state groups.

The murders of four other African-American men in this area in 1964 are attributed to Klan members. White supremacist violence against civil rights activists continued in succeeding years, even after Congress passed major civil rights legislation intended to dismantle segregation and protect voting rights.

As Klan violence rose in the 1960s, African American residents organized the Deacons for Defense and Justice, an armed self-defense organization formed to protect Black communities and civil rights activists from racist violence modeled on a similar organization founded earlier in Louisiana. James Jackson, a Natchez barber, publicly announced the organization's creation the day after George Metcalf was critically injured in a racist car bombing attack on August 27, 1965. The Deacons began to accompany NAACP officers and protesters and openly carried firearms in accordance with Mississippi law as part of community self-defense efforts.

George Metcalf and Wharlest Jackson Sr. both worked at the Armstrong Tire and Rubber Plant, where they advocated for African American workers to gain access to jobs and promotions that had historically been reserved for white employees. They were both active in the Natchez chapter of the NAACP: Metcalf as president and Jackson as treasurer. On February 27, 1967, Jackson was killed when a car bomb went off in his truck as he drove home from work. He had recently received a raise and promotion to a position the company had historically limited to white employees. A Korean War veteran, he was married with five children. His murder remains officially unsolved, and no one was convicted.

In August 1967, Metcalf submitted a petition to the school board in support of school desegregation. (The Supreme Court had ruled segregated public schools as unconstitutional in 1954.) He asked the board not to publish the names of the petition's signatories, but the board nevertheless released them publicly, exposing the signatories to retaliation. Little more than a week later, Metcalf was severely injured in a car bombing widely understood as retaliation for his civil rights activism. It was never solved.

In response to these attacks, the Natchez Deacons for Defense increased their public security patrols and protective activities. Many members were also active in the NAACP and were well known to one another. They maintained secrecy about the group, evading investigation by the Mississippi Sovereignty Commission and others. This group was important in the community; its members and numbers were kept secret, but they created a visible deterrent against white supremacist violence targeting Black residents. In addition to protecting activists, the Deacons helped enforce civil rights initiatives, such as economic boycotts targeting segregated white-owned businesses, in a successful effort to pressure Natchez businesses and officials to desegregate public accommodations and hiring practices. Deacons' chapters were organized in other areas of Mississippi.

In 1966, the House Un-American Activities Committee published the names of Natchez residents who were current or former members of the Klan, including more than 70 employees at the International Paper plant in the city, as well as members of the Natchez police and the Adams County Sheriff's departments. HUAC reported that at least four white supremacist terrorist organizations were operating in Natchez during the 1960s, including the Mississippi White Caps ("MWC"). The MWC distributed flyers anonymously around the city, threatening supporters of racial integration as "crooks and mongrelizers". Another segregationist organization, the Americans for the Preservation of the White Race, was founded in May 1963 by nine residents of Natchez.

Claude Fuller and Natchez Klansmen Ernest Avants and James Lloyd Jones helped organize the white supremacist terrorist group known as the Cottonmouth Moccasin Gang. In June 1966, they abducted and murdered Natchez resident Ben Chester White, reportedly as part of a plot to draw Dr. Martin Luther King Jr. to Natchez to assassinate him. The three Klansmen were arrested and charged by the state with the murder. In each case, despite overwhelming evidence and, in Jones' case, a confession, either the charges were dismissed, or the defendants were acquitted by segregated all-white juries. Black citizens had been systematically excluded from juries for decades as they had been disenfranchised under Mississippi's 1890 constitution and related Jim Crow laws. By 1966, the Voting Rights Act had been passed, but local courts and prosecutors continued using discriminatory practices to keep many Black citizens off juries.

=== Prosecution of civil rights cold cases ===
James Ford Seale, one of two white men arrested in November 1964 in connection with the abduction and murders of Henry Hezekiah Dee and Charles Henry Moore, was released after state prosecutors declined to pursue charges, claiming insufficient evidence. Public and investigative attention to the case renewed after 2000, after journalists uncovered previously overlooked FBI records from 1964. The FBI subsequently reopened the case. Federal prosecutors arrested and charged Seale with civil rights violations connected to the killings. In 2007, a federal jury convicted him on charges related to the abductions and murders. He died in federal prison in 2011 at the age of 76.

Federal investigators determined that Ben Chester White, murdered in June 1966 at age sixty-seven, had been killed on federal land near Pretty Creek in the Homochitto National Forest of Natchez. This allowed federal authorities to assert jurisdiction over the case and pursue a renewed criminal investigation. In 1999, the case was reopened. Federal authorities indicted Ernest Avants in 2000 for White's murder. He was convicted in 2003 and sentenced to life in prison; he died the following year at the age of seventy-two.

In February 2011, the television series The Injustice Files on the Investigation Discovery channel aired three episodes examining unresolved civil-rights-era murders. The first episode focused on the 1967 car-bomb assassination of assassination of Wharlest Jackson. The program formed part of a broader collaboration with the FBI, which had started an initiative in 2007 to reopen, investigate, and, where possible, prosecute unresolved civil-rights-era killings.

== Natural disasters ==
On May 7, 1840, an intense tornado struck Natchez, killing 269 people, most of whom were on flatboats in the Mississippi River. The tornado killed 317 people in all, making it the second-deadliest tornado in United States history.

In August 2005, in the aftermath of Hurricane Katrina, Natchez served as a refuge for residents of coastal Mississippi and Louisiana, providing shelters, hotel rooms, rentals, Federal Emergency Management Agency assistance, and animal shelters. Natchez was able to keep fuel supplies open for the duration of the disaster, provide essential power to the most affected areas, receive food deliveries, and maintain law and order while assisting visitors from other areas. Many churches, including Parkway Baptist Church, were used as emergency shelters. In the months after the hurricane, a majority of the available homes were purchased or rented, with some tenants making Natchez their permanent home.

Flooding in 2011 drove the Mississippi River to crest at 61.9 feet (18.9 m) on May 19, the highest recorded height of the river since the 1930s.

== Images and memory ==
Some prominent white families in Natchez have used the Natchez Pilgrimage, an annual tour of antebellum homes, to promote a nostalgic interpretation of the city's plantation-era past, often minimizing or sanitizing the central role of slavery in the region's wealth and social order. Since the Civil Rights Movement, African American residents, historians, and preservation advocates have increasingly challenged these narratives by demanding fuller inclusion of African American history and experiences in the city's public memory and tourism industry. Author Paul Hendrickson detailed how traditional versions of the Natchez Pilgrimage largely excluded African American perspectives and histories, "Blacks are not a part of the Natchez Pilgrimage".

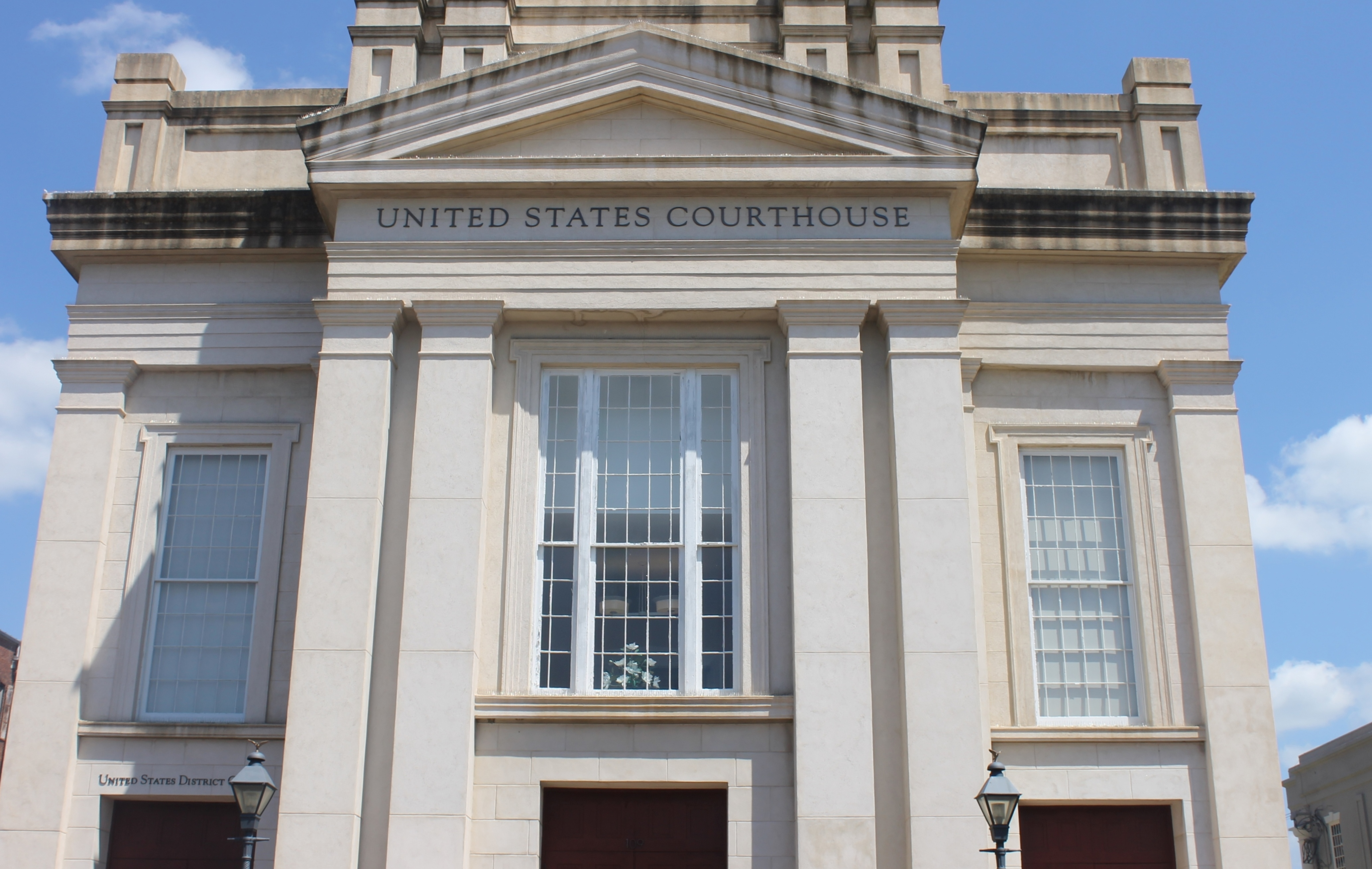
Courthouse for the United States District Court for the Southern District of Mississippi at 101 South Pearl Street

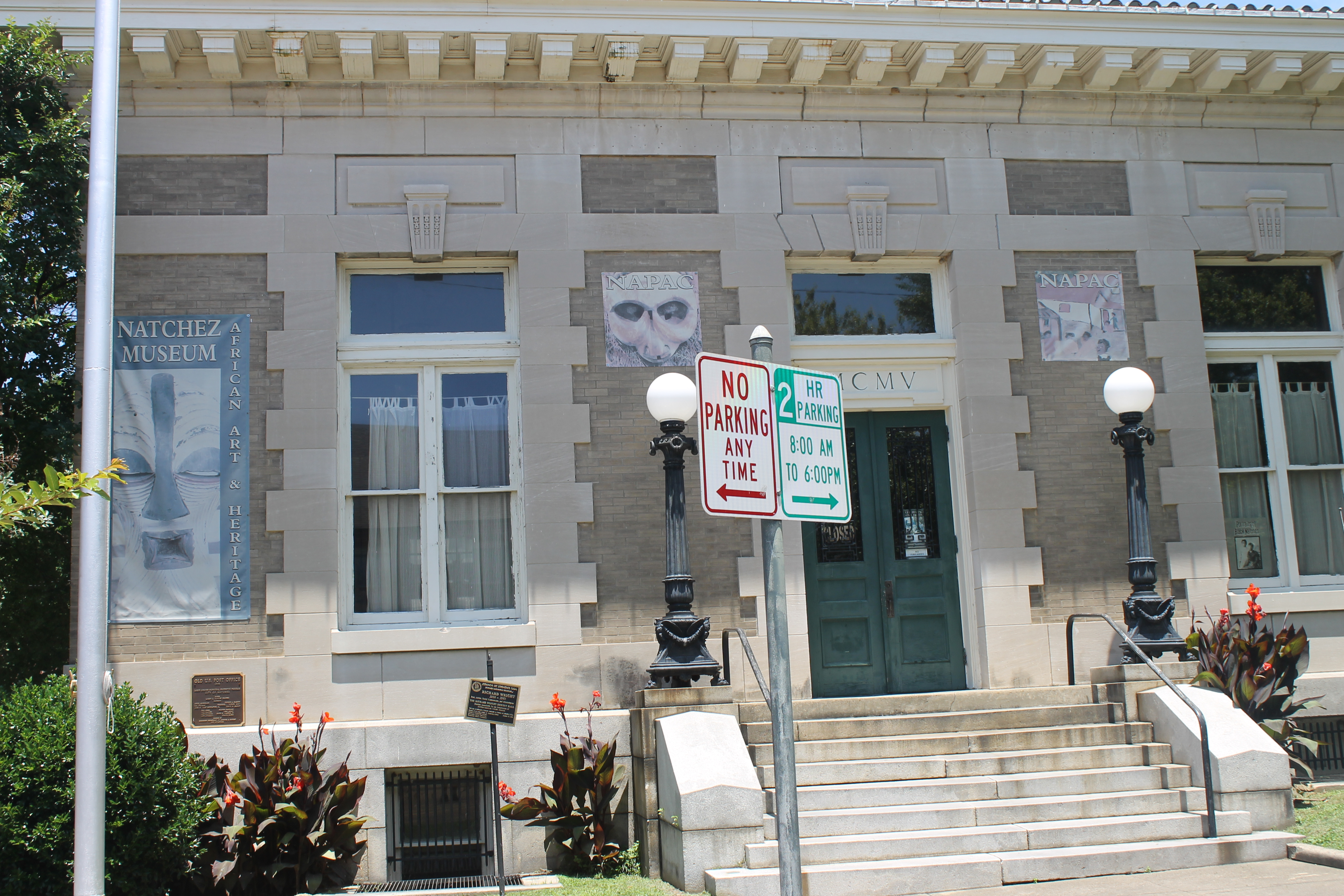
Natchez Museum of African American History and Culture at 301 Main Street

By the winter of 1988, the National Park Service established Natchez National Historical Park around Melrose mansion. The William Johnson House in the city was added a few years later. National Park Service interpretation has generally emphasized a more historically comprehensive account of Natchez's past, including slavery, African American life, and racial violence. In 2021, Forks of the Road Market, which at one time was the second largest slave-trading site in the United States, was added to the National Historical Park.

Film and television productions have frequently used Natchez's preserved historic district as a setting for depictions of the slavery era. Disney's The Adventures of Huck Finn was partially filmed here in 1993. The 1982 television movie Rascals and Robbers: The Adventures of Tom Sawyer and Huck Finn was also filmed here. The television miniseries Beulah Land was filmed in Natchez, as were some individual weekly episodes of the TV drama The Mississippi, starring Ralph Waite. Parts of the television miniseries North and South were filmed in Natchez and neighboring Washington. Also, John Wayne's The Horse Soldiers was filmed in and around Natchez.

In 2007, a United States Courthouse was opened after a historic building was renovated and repurposed. The building contained a Jim Crow-era monument commemorating local World War I service members. The 1924 monument was the subject of several stories in the Natchez Democrat, as reporters noted it excluded Black soldiers from Natchez and Adams County who had also served in World War I. A 2010 article suggested expanding the monument to reflect all the local troops and replacing the old monument. On November 10, 2011, new plaques were installed listing the names of 592 African American soldiers and 107 white soldiers previously omitted from the memorial.

Filmmaker Ed Pincus documented the civil rights struggle in Natchez in the cinéma vérité film Black Natchez (2010). The film focuses on African American political organizing and community self-defense efforts during 1965–1967. After a Black community leader is injured in a car bombing, the film documents debates within the Black community over strategy, leadership, and armed self-defense. Local activists organize a chapter of the Deacons for Defense and Justice. The documentary portrays tensions between more cautious local leadership and younger or more militant activists.

The Natchez Museum of African American History and Culture opened in 1991.
