= Brumfield High School =

Former public school in Natchez, Mississippi

- U.S. National Register of Historic Places
- Mississippi Landmark
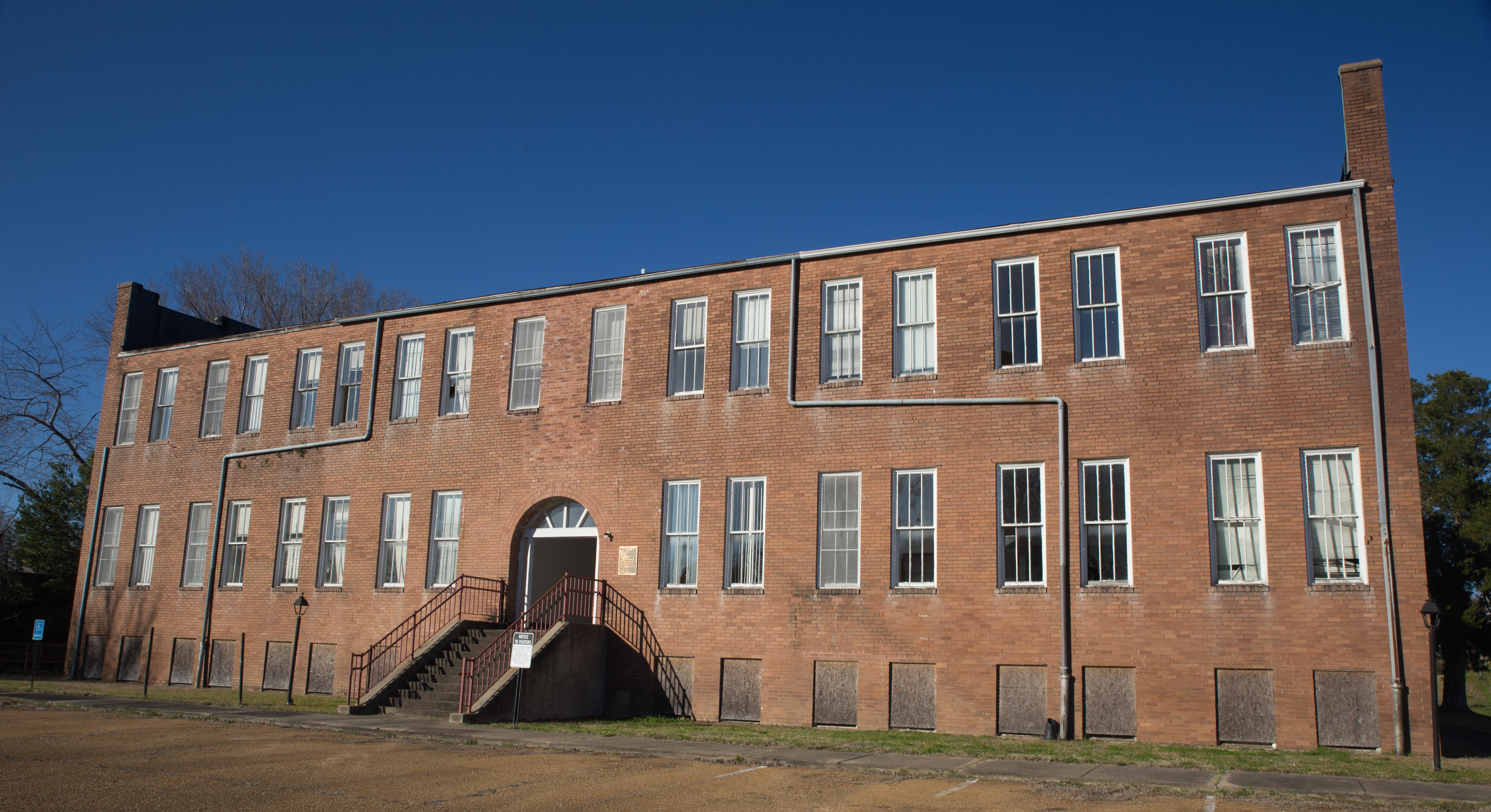
- Brumfield High School building (2019)

- Location within Mississippi
- Location: 100 St. Catherine Street, Natchez, Adams County, Mississippi, U.S.
- Coordinates: 31.557382°N 91.392528°W
- Built: 1925
- Architect: William Steintenroth
- NRHP reference No.: 93001139
- USMS No.: 001-NAT-0968-NR-ML

Significant dates
- Added to NRHP: October 21, 1993
- Designated USMS: January 7, 1993

Brumfield High School, formerly G. W. Brumfield School, was a segregated public high school for African American students built in 1925 and closed in 1990; located in Natchez, Mississippi.

It has been listed as a Mississippi Landmark since January 7, 1993; and as a National Register of Historic Place for architecture, education, and cultural heritage since October 21, 1993.

== History ==
The first African American public school in the city of Natchez was Union School, built in 1871. However Union School (K-12 public school) only had 13 rooms and could not accommodate the demand. By 1925, Brumfield High School was opened to alleviate the overcrowding issues. Natchez High School (at 64 Homochitto Street, a former location) was built a few years after Brumfield School in 1927, and was specifically designed as a public high school for white students-only.

The Brumfield High School was a two-story brick building designed by architect William Steintenroth in a Classical Revival style. The school namesake was George Washington Brumfield (1866–1927) who had taught classes at the Union School and served as a principal, after his arrival to Natchez in the 1890s. Brumfield was also the Sunday school teacher at Zion Chapel African Methodist Episcopal Church (Zion Chapel AME Church), located near the campus. In 1935, the graduating class was 40 students.

In 1970, Brumfield School remained racially segregated at the classroom-level, with white students and white teachers in one room versus black students with a black teachers in another. The school was closed in 1990, and the city invested one million dollars into converting the former school campus into apartments for welfare recipients, the Brumfield School Apartments.

== See also ==
- National Register of Historic Places listings in Adams County, Mississippi
- History of Natchez, Mississippi
- Natchez Junior College, historically black college opened in 1884
- Rhythm Club fire, 1940 event that occurred near Brumfield School
- Murder of Wharlest Jackson, a Natchez event in 1967
