= Allan Kornblum =

American judge

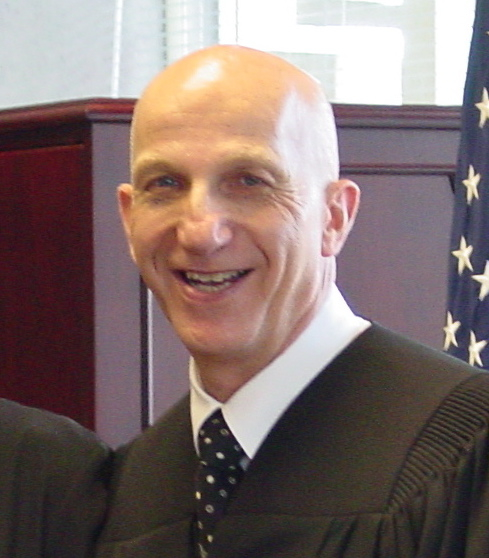
Allan Kornblum at his investiture in 2003.

Allan Nathaniel Kornblum (March 4, 1938 – February 12, 2010) was a United States federal judge and authored key parts of the Foreign Intelligence Surveillance Act. During his career he also served as an adviser to the United States Foreign Intelligence Surveillance Court, an FBI agent, a Treasury agent, a New York City Police officer, Director of Security for Princeton University, and an officer in the U.S. Army.

Kornblum was born in New York City, New York. He attended Stuyvesant High School in that city and was named all-city football quarterback in 1954. He earned degrees in police administration from Michigan State University and a law degree from the New York University School of Law.

In 1961, Kornblum joined the New York City Police Department before being drafted by the U.S. Army. He served in Korea and upstate New York before separating and joining the Federal Bureau of Investigation. During his time in the FBI, Kornblum worked on Civil Rights cases in Mississippi and bank robbery cases in New York City. From there Kornblum moved to Princeton University to become the Director of Security while simultaneously earning a PhD, writing a dissertation on corruption in the New York City Police Department.

Kornblum was recruited by the Department of Justice to help reign in U.S. Government surveillance operations in the mid-1970s. He wrote key parts of the Foreign Intelligence Surveillance Act (FISA) and oversaw the law's implementation for the next two decades. In particular he developed the policies for minimization; that the Government should only retain valuable intelligence information and not collect other private information. During this time Kornblum was involved in the investigations of such notable spies as John Anthony Walker and Aldrich Ames.

In 2003, Kornblum testified at a federal trial based on his experience with the FBI in Mississippi. Ernest Avants, a former Ku Klux Klan member, was accused of killing Ben Chester White in 1967. Kornblum testified Avants confessed to the crime, "'Yeah, I shot that nigger,'", but Avants added that when he shot White, another man had already shot him several times. Kornblum noted Avants' attorney advised him he would be acquitted as "you can't be convicted for killing a dead man." Avants was convicted and later died in prison.

Later that same year, Kornblum was appointed as a United States magistrate judge for the Northern District of Florida. He assumed his office on October 17, 2003, and served until his death seven years later.

Allan Kornblum died of esophageal cancer on February 12, 2010, at the University of Florida Shands Cancer Center in Gainesville, Florida.
