= Union High School =

Union High School may refer to:

== United States ==
- Natchez Union High School, Natchez, Mississippi
- Redondo Union High School, Los Angeles, California
- Union High School (Modoc), Modoc, Indiana
- Union High School (Iowa), La Porte City, Iowa
- Union High School (Grand Rapids, Michigan)
- Union High School (Missouri), Union, Missouri
- Union High School (New Jersey), Union Township, Union County, New Jersey
- Union High School (Oklahoma), Tulsa, Oklahoma
- Union High School (Oregon), Union, Oregon
- Union High School-Main Street Grammar School, Union, South Carolina
- Union High School in Gallatin, Tennessee, a school for blacks
- Union High School (Utah), Roosevelt, Utah
- Union High School (Big Stone Gap, Virginia)
- Union High School (Camas, Washington)
- Union High School (Black River Falls, Wisconsin)

== See also ==
- Union County High School (Georgia), Blairsville, Georgia
- Union County High School (Kentucky), Morganfield, Kentucky
