= Union school district =

Consolidation of various school districts

In some U.S. states, a union school district or union high school district is a school district that has been established by the consolidation of "two or more school districts situated in the same county". A Joint union school district is similar, but the component districts are "situated wholly or in part in different counties". A union school district is distinguished from a unified school district (USD) in that a union school district generally does not include or operate both primary or grade schools and high schools. A "unified school district" generally does include and operate both types of schools. (Vermont has a different distinction, as explained below.)

== Arizona ==
In Arizona, a union high school district is generally one that includes and operates high schools. Sometimes the name is derived from the name of the first school that was opened, using the word "Union" in its full name. Examples include the Casa Grande Union High School District (the Union school still uses the full name), the Phoenix Union High School District, the Glendale Union High School District, and the Tempe Union High School District. Some special union high school districts — such as the Santa Cruz Valley Union High School District — include and operate only one school.

== California ==
The California Education Code states that "A high school district, other than a city high school district, comprising two or more elementary school districts lying wholly in the same county is a union high school district, and such designation shall be part of its name."

== Michigan ==
According to an 1843 Michigan law, multiple primary school districts could consolidate within an incorporated city. These "union school districts" usually housed multiple graded classrooms within a single building, unlike primary school districts which were often ungraded one-room schoolhouses. Some union school districts had "academic departments," or high schools, and this became more common after an 1859 law allowed districts with 200 or more students to establish a high school that could be funded by a separate tax approved by district voters.

== Vermont ==
In Vermont, a union school district "is established when two or more school districts agree to join together to own, construct, or operate schools." A union school district is a unified school district if the town school districts have been abolished.

== School names ==
Several school districts are named "Union School District" or similar constructions, without it satisfying the criteria above:

- Union School District, San Jose, California—named in honor of the Union Army during the American Civil War
- Union Public Schools, Oklahoma
- Union School District (Arkansas)
- Union Area School District, Pennsylvania
- Union County–College Corner Joint State School District, Indiana and Ohio
- Union County School District (Florida)
