= Union City School District =

Union City School District or Union City Public Schools or Union City Board of Education may mean:

- Randolph Eastern School Corporation, in Union City, Wayne Township, Randolph County, Indiana
- Union City Community Schools (Michigan), in Union City, Branch County, Michigan
- Union City School District (New Jersey), in Union City, New Jersey
- Union City School District (Oklahoma), in Union City, Canadian County, Oklahoma
- Union City Area School District, in Union City, Erie County, Pennsylvania
- Union City Schools (Tennessee), in Union City, Obion County, Tennessee

== See also ==
- Union School District (disambiguation)
