= Natchez Institute =

Former public school in Natchez, Mississippi

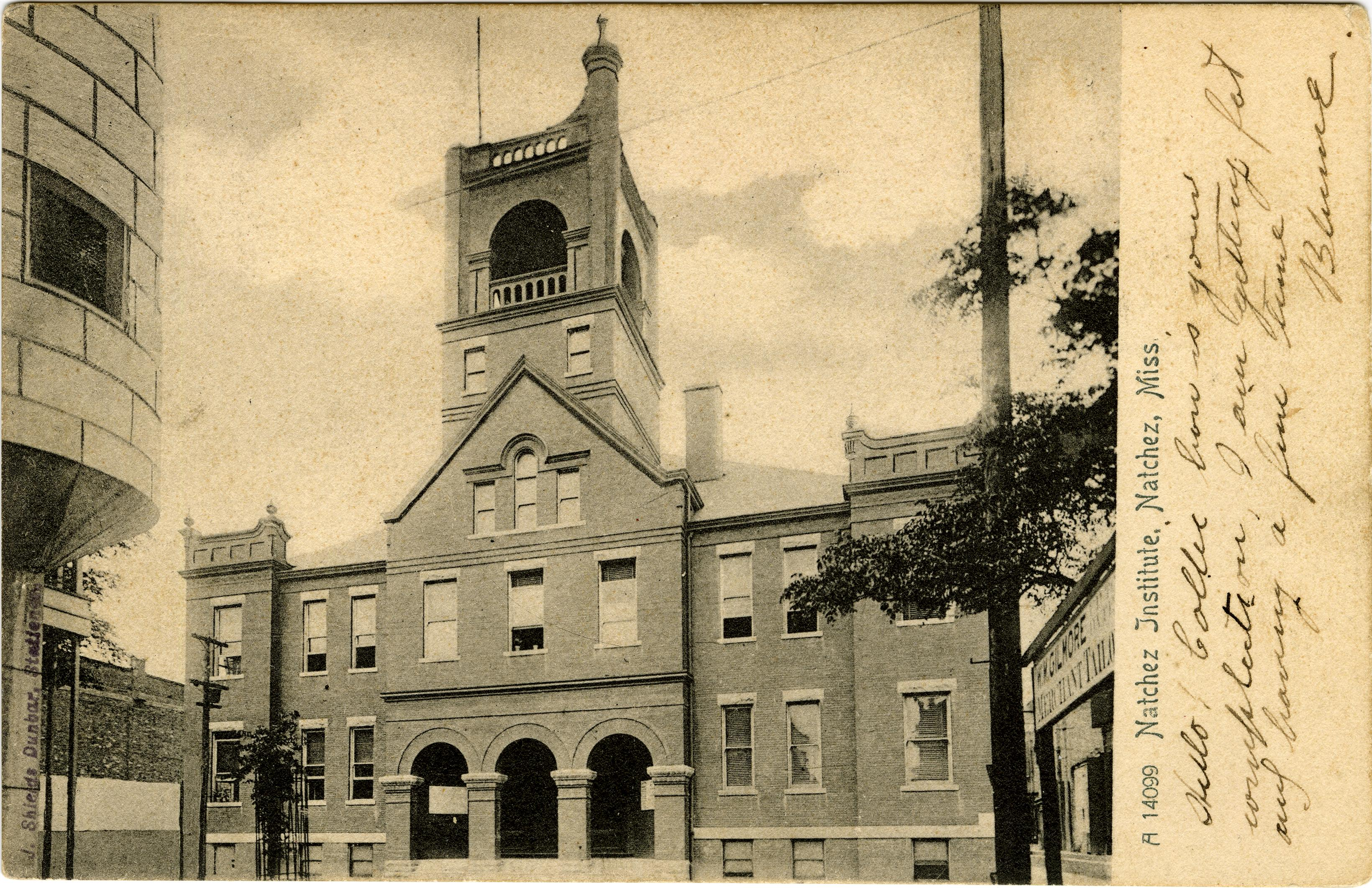
- Natchez Institute, c. 1900

- Location within Mississippi
- 31.559984°N 91.402784°W
- Location: 108 Commerce Street, Natchez, Adams County, Mississippi, U.S.

History
- Built: 1845
- Rebuilt: 1901

Mississippi Landmark
- Designated: June 20, 1985
- Reference no.: 001-NAT-0081-NRD-ML

The Natchez Institute was a segregated K-12 public school "for whites-only" established in 1845 and closed in ? in Natchez, Mississippi. It was the first public, co-educational school in the city that offered a full course of classes. It is listed as a Mississippi Landmark since June 20, 1985.

== History ==
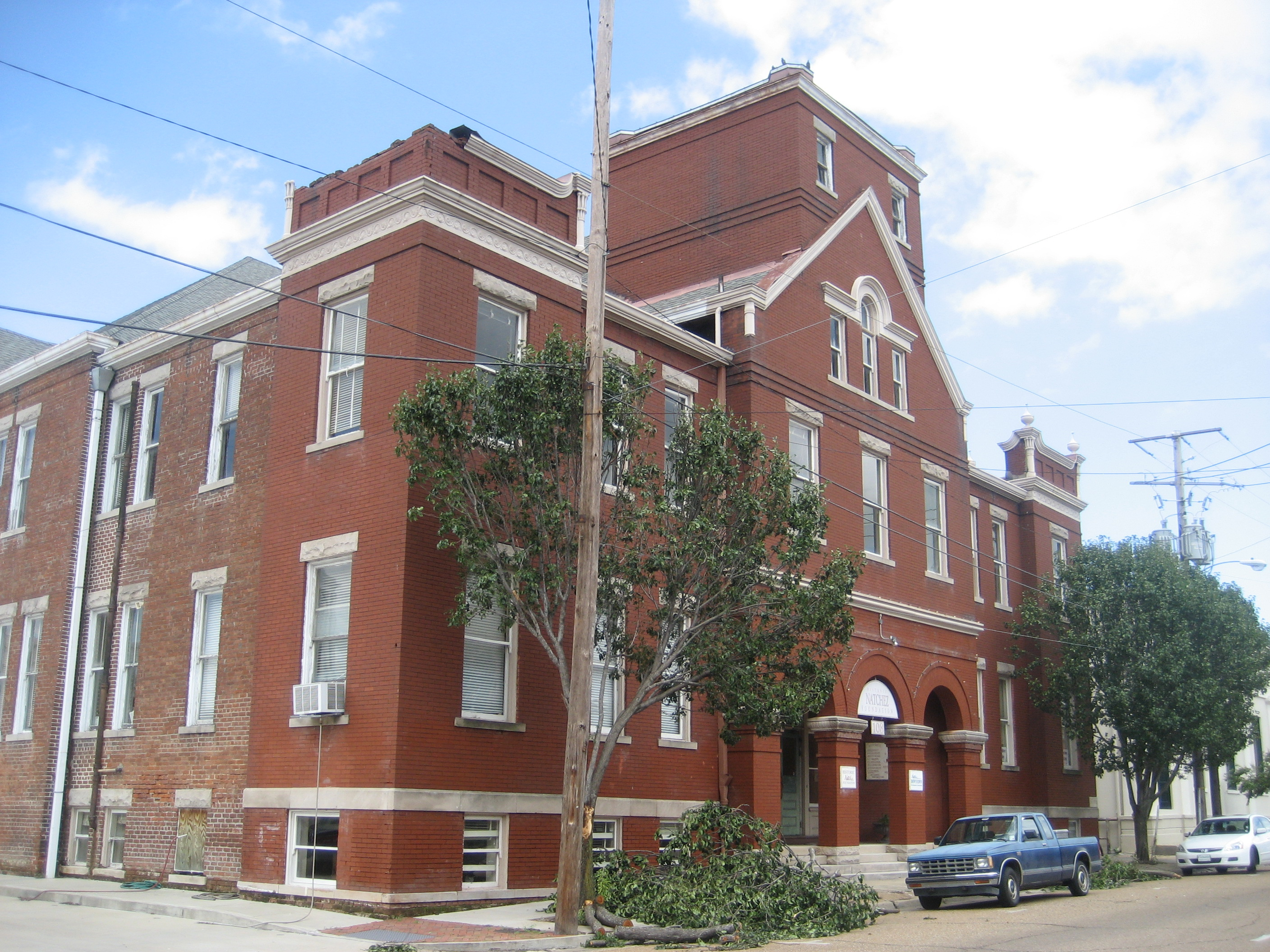
Former Natchez Institute building (2008), designed by architect John W. Gaddis

Local merchant Alvarez Fisk (1784–1853) founded the Natchez Institute with a donation of land, buildings, and money. The first building held up to 1,000 students. Prior to the formation of this school, only wealthy residents could afford a formal education for their children, and most parents didn’t have formal education themselves. Natchez Institute was racially segregated and was "for whites-only".

In the 1850s, Natchez Institute school enrolled kindergarten through 12th grade, and had as many as 750 students in attendance. Because of unexpected high enrollment, more than half of the city‘s revenue was allotted for the school. The original building for Natchez Institute burned down. It was rebuilt in 1901 as a larger school building with a tower. The school received push back by many of the wealthy men in Natchez who objected to tax money funding public schools.

Union School in Natchez, built in 1871, was the first public school by the city for African American students. It was at the southeast corner of North Union and Monroe Streets.

Natchez Institute's main building at 108 Commerce Street is now the home of the Historic Natchez Foundation. The Institute Hall at 111 S. Pearl Street was once used as a performance hall for the school, and is now a United States Courthouse, and is listed as a National Register of Historic Place.

== See also ==
- History of Natchez, Mississippi
- Jefferson College (Mississippi), an early all-male prep school in Adams County
- List of Mississippi Landmarks
- National Register of Historic Places listings in Adams County, Mississippi
