= United States Courthouse (Natchez) =

- Institute Hall
- U.S. National Register of Historic Places
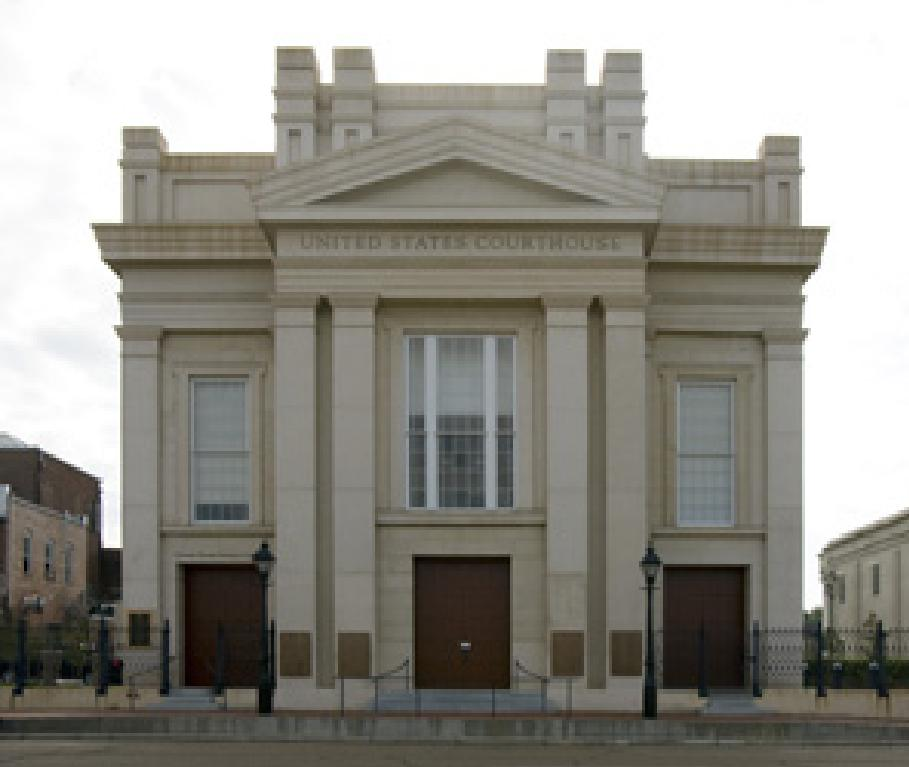
- The United States Courthouse following its rededication

- Location within Mississippi Location within the United States
- Location: 111 S. Pearl ST., Natchez, Mississippi
- Coordinates: 31°33′34″N 91°24′12″W
- Area: less than one acre
- Built: 1853
- Built by: Weldon Brothers; Reynolds & Brown
- Architectural style: Greek Revival
- NRHP reference No.: 79001287
- Added to NRHP: June 20, 1979

The United States Courthouse, previously known as Institute Hall, Opera Hall, and Memorial Hall, is a building in Natchez, Mississippi that was initially constructed from 1851 to 1853, for use as an educational building. It has served a variety of public purposes in the intervening years. It was listed on the National Register of Historic Places in 1979. In 2007, it was rededicated as a courthouse of the United States District Court for the Southern District of Mississippi.

== Building history ==
The cornerstone for the United States Courthouse, originally known as Institute Hall, was laid in 1852. The president of the Natchez Board of Education stated at the cornerstone laying ceremony that it would "serve as a monument to the past showing what can be accomplished in a few years by willing hearts and ready hands. It will be a beacon in the future, calling for deeds to emulate the past". The building was built by the Weldon Brothers. The building was completed in 1853 and intended to serve as a place for events and performances related to the adjacent Natchez Institute school. It opened on Independence Day that year. The building quickly became the city's entertainment venue, hosting traveling acts and local celebrations. By the 1890s, newspapers called the building Opera Hall. (It had briefly doubled as a roller rink.) In 1901 the basement-level girls' classrooms were relocated to the new building of the Natchez Institute. That same year, a new concert hall opened in the city, and Opera Hall attracted few events.

In 1921, the American Legion refashioned the building as a World War I monument, adding a proscenium stage and patriotic decor. In 1924, they added four bronze plaques with the names of World War I veterans and two descriptive plaques, and the structure was renamed Memorial Hall. The newly renamed building continued to serve a wide variety of purposes for the city throughout the twentieth century. It was a teen canteen, a library, a charity clothing drop-off center, a museum, an American Legion hall, a place for the city to store voting booths, a location for boxing matches, and it occasionally still hosted public performances. One notable use began in 1932, as the first pageant was held in Memorial Hall during the Natchez Pilgrimage, the nation's second oldest organized house tour.

By the 1970s, the building was in a decaying condition. In 1987, the Historic Natchez Foundation, working with the city, purchased the dilapidated building, began emergency repairs, and waited for a preservation-supportive occupant.

Changing US courts needs led the US District courts to relocate a court to Natchez. Through a partnership involving federal, state, and local agencies working closely with Waggonner & Ball Architects, Memorial Hall was rehabilitated for use as a federal courthouse. In 2007, Natchez once again was the site of a federal court. More than 200 years earlier, it had a federal courthouse when it was the capital of the Mississippi Territory.

=== Report on 1924 World War I plaques ===
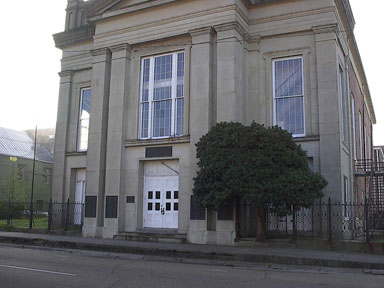
Photo of hall before restoration; four plaques are mounted on the paired pilasters.

On March 14, 2010, the Natchez Democrat reported that the names of more than 500 black servicemen from Adams County in World War I had been excluded from the memorial plaques, which were installed in 1924 during an extended period of state racial segregation, at what is now the US Courthouse. Shane Peterson, a student at California State University Northridge, had researched the issue and published a paper online; he found that a federal roster shows that 581 black men entered the U.S. Army from Adams County between 1917 and 1918, and approximately 200 of the veterans returned to Adams County after the war, yet none is listed on the courthouse plaques.

Peterson contacted Ser Seshs Ab Heter-C.M. Boxley, a local activist and coordinator of the Friends of the Forks of the Road, for help in getting the names added. Boxley suggested that new memorial plaques were needed to correct the exclusion related to the racial segregation of the Jim Crow era. Media covered the reaction of the new owner of the monument, the United States General Services Administration (GSA), which manages public buildings on behalf of federal courts and agencies.

External videos
- Homecoming in Natchez: U.S. Courthouse, Natchez, Mississippi, U.S. General Services Administration

In April 2010, a GSA spokesman said the agency was working on correcting the exclusion. In November GSA hired a consultant to aid with research and public outreach on the project. The consultant confirmed that the names of more than 500 black men from the Natchez area had been left off the plaques; in addition, 100 white men had been overlooked. The corrected list of veterans was published at the Armstrong Library, the federal courthouse, the Natchez Historic Foundation, the Natchez Museum of African American Culture, and the Natchez Visitor Reception Center, as well as online. On behalf of GSA, the consultant invited people to send any additions. Outreach has been conducted to such service groups as the American Legion, in order to solicit any additions. New plaques will be commissioned which will be complete. The original plaques will be moved inside to be part of an interpretive exhibit on Natchez in World War I and the roles played by all its veterans.

== Architecture ==
The structure is a rare example of a nineteenth-century Greek Revival auditorium. It was designed by the noted English-born Kentucky architect Thomas Lewinski, while he worked as supervisor of the construction of a nearby Marine Hospital. The Greek Revival style building resembles Lewinski's work in Kentucky more so than the Greek Revival mansions of Natchez. The courthouse is rectangular in plan with two stories and a gabled roof. A primary Greek Revival feature is its symmetrical, three-bay facade, classically detailed with a centered, single bay engaged portico flanked by recessed side bays. The engaged portico features paired pilasters supporting a triple banded architrave, a wide frieze, a molded cornice, and a pediment. A molded panel parapet surmounts the facade with paired piers that echo the arrangement of the pilasters below them. The wide frieze continues along either side of the building, which is brick clad and has six window bays along its lower levels. The upper levels of the building contain larger wood windows. The second story above the main entrance contains a more elaborate double-height window with multi-light sidelights. The rear elevation has a central portico with pilasters rendered in brick. It has a modern stairwell addition enclosed in semi-opaque glass, constructed as part of the building's recent renovation. The front elevation on Pearl Street includes its original ornamental wrought iron fence and two decorative pole light fixtures, recreated based upon original documentation.

Entranceways are present at each of the facade's three bays. The main entrance, located in the center bay, is composed of a pair of eight-paneled molded doors that open onto a foyer. Inside, a pair of wood doors adorned with upper panel patterning of octagonal openings is present at the foyer's rear wall. They are set within a wide wood surround with a peaked lintel containing a federal-style eagle motif in the center. The doors lead into a corridor that continues the length of the building, with offices located off of either side of it. Within the foyer are symmetrically placed matching staircases that lead to the second floor. Each is made of turned wood newels and balusters, makes two quarter turns, and has winders at beginning and end. The grand staircase leads to a second-floor landing at the entrance to the main courtroom.

The second level features a large open space that was originally an auditorium, and was rehabilitated into a federal courtroom. The courtroom space, with blonde wood partitions, is a recently added room within the larger pre-existing space. To give visitors a sense of the original width of the room and allow light to penetrate the courtroom, above eye level, wood louvers and glass panels top the partitions. A turned spindle wood balustrade, for a former balcony at the room's rear wall, is retained.

== History ==
- 1851-1853: Building designed and constructed to provide public school auditorium and classroom space
- 1890s: Referred to as the Opera Hall, building becomes the city's entertainment venue
- 1901: Both new school building and new concert hall are constructed, leaving the building almost vacant
- 1921: Renovated by the American Legion and renamed Memorial Hall in honor of World War I veterans
- 1924: Plaques with the names of Adams County World War I Veterans and two descriptive plaques bolted to the facade
- 1930s: Used as pageant venue for the Natchez Pilgrimage House Tour
- 1965: Natchez library, housed in basement since 1883, relocates
- 1968-1970s: Natchez Museum occupies auditorium
- 1979: Building listed in National Register of Historic Places
- 1986-1987: After auditorium ceiling collapses, Historic Natchez Foundation acquires building and champions its preservation
- 2004: GSA acquires building and begins, in conjunction with many public and private agencies, its rehabilitation into a courthouse
- 2007: United States Courthouse in Natchez begins session

== Building facts ==
- Location: 109 South Pearl Street
- Architects: Thomas Lewinski; Waggonner & Ball Architects
- Construction Dates: 1851–1853; 2003–2007
- Landmark Status: Listed in the National Register of Historic Places
- Architectural Style: Greek Revival
- Primary Materials: Brick and stucco
- Prominent Features: Classical facade with parapet; Courtroom in original two-story auditorium; Elaborate staircases
