= Union School District, San Jose =

School district in California

The Union School District operates six elementary schools (K-5) and two middle schools (6–8) in the greater San Jose, California, USA area. The district serves 4400 students. Confusingly, the district is not a union school district under California law; rather, it was named in honor of the Union Army when founded in 1863, during the American Civil War.

School Facts
School name	Students	FTE Teachers	Pupil/Teacher Ratio
Alta Vista Elementary School*	454	19	19.4
Athenour Elementary School	---	--	---
Carlton Elementary School	401	19	18.5
Dartmouth Middle School	916	41.6	21.1
Guadalupe Elementary School	452	15	22.6
Lietz Elementary School	473	20	18.7
Lone Hill Elementary School	---	---	
Noddin Elementary School	624	25	20.9
Oster Elementary School	459	13	22.2
Union Middle School	803	35.8	22.2

Note: Based on 2002–2003 school year data
*Alta Vista Elementary is in Los Gatos; all the rest are in San Jose.
