= Union School (Natchez, Mississippi) =

Former public school in Natchez, Mississippi

Location
- corner of North Union and Monroe Streets, Natchez, Mississippi, U.S.
- 31.557633°N 91.392517°W

Information
- Other names: Natchez Union School, Natchez Union High School
- School type: Public, segregated
- Opened: 1871
- Closed: circa 1925

The Union School was the first public, co-educational school for African American students in Natchez, Mississippi, United States. Formed in 1871 and closed in 1925, it was located at the southeast corner of North Union and Monroe Streets.

== History ==
The Union School was established in 1871 as a brick building with 13 rooms, capable of accommodating up to 948 children. The school opened in the fall of 1871, led by Theodore H. Greene and employed 9 black teachers, with the enrollment of 406 students. In 1887, the school was led by principal John S. Meekins, with enrollment of 267 students. By 1909, the school had enrollment of 1,175 students. In 1924, the lower grade levels had as many as 120 students in a single classroom, which prompted the school board to plead with the mayor to make changes.

In 1925, the Brumfield High School, another African American public school in Natchez, was built to alleviate the overcrowding. The school's namesake was George Washington Brumfield (1866–1927), who had taught classes at the Union School and served as a principal after he arrived in Natchez in the 1890s. Brumfield also served as the Sunday school teacher at Zion Chapel African Methodist Episcopal Church (Zion Chapel AME Church).

The Union School operated during a period of racial segregation in Mississippi. The Natchez Institute was the first public school established by the city for white-only students, established in 1845. By 1950s, the Union School building was demolished. The school is included in the "African American Public Education, Natchez Trails" historical marker at its former site.

== See also ==
- History of Natchez, Mississippi
- Natchez Junior College, a historically black college, opened in 1884
