= Union School District (Arkansas) =

Defunct school district in Arkansas, United States

Union School District was a school district headquartered in unincorporated Union County, Arkansas, near El Dorado. Its mascot was the cyclone.

On July 1, 2004, it merged into the El Dorado School District.
