= Ben Chester White =

Man murdered by the KKK in 1966

- Born: January 5, 1899; Natchez, Mississippi, US
- Died: June 10, 1966 (aged 67); Natchez, Mississippi, US
- Occupations: Caretaker, Deacon
- Children: 2

Ben Chester White (January 5, 1899 – June 10, 1966) was an African-American caretaker, uninvolved in the civil rights movement, murdered by the Ku Klux Klan. This was likely in an attempt to move focus away from James Meredith’s March Against Fear or to lure Martin Luther King, Jr. in an assassination attempt. This murder went unnoticed by King.

== Biography ==
=== Early life ===
For his whole life, Ben Chester White was a caretaker to the Carter family farm on Liberty Road in Natchez, Mississippi, as well as a deacon in the local Baptist church. He would perform tasks around the farm and with a limited ability to read would still quote vast passages from the bible.

=== Children ===
- Jesse White - left to Baton Rouge
- Louis White - left to Vietnam

=== Death and afterward ===
Ben Chester White was murdered by James L. Jones, Claude Fuller, and Ernest Avants of the Ku Klux Klan on June 10, 1966; he is buried in Southwood Lodge Church Cemetery, Natchez, Mississippi. After buying Ben Chester White a soda, the three men took him into the Homochitto National Forest, ostensibly to help them find a lost dog, where he was shot eighteen times, dumped into Pretty Creek; the murderers burned the car in a planter's driveway across the county. Jones would be the one to soon after confess to the crime. Fuller and Jones were indicted but never tried, and Avants was acquitted (White's family later won a financial judgment that was never paid).

In 1968, Jesse White sued the KKK for his father's death and was awarded $1 million from the court. This was the first time in history the organization was legally held responsible for one of its members. The $1 million was never received. In 1989, White was featured in the Civil Rights Memorial.

In 2000, Ernest Avants, the only surviving perpetrator, was arrested by federal officials. It had recently been discovered that White was killed on federal property, meaning his murder was a federal crime. In 2003, Avants was found guilty of first degree murder by a federal jury in Mississippi and sentenced to life in prison. He died in prison on June 14, 2004.

Footage about White was shown in a 2013 episode of the documentary Civil Rights Movement Road Trip.

Avants was also implicated in the 1965 murder of Earl Hodges, a disillusioned former Klansman who had disavowed the group and whom colleagues feared was going to tell the police about their crimes.
