= Daniel P. Jordan =

Daniel P. Jordan may refer to:

- Daniel P. Jordan III, United States district judge
- Daniel P. Jordan (historian), American historian

== See also ==
- Daniel Jordan (disambiguation)
