= Jackson Academy (Mississippi) =

Private school in Jackson, Mississippi, US

Location
- 4908 Ridgewood Road; Jackson, Mississippi; 32°21′45″N 90°8′28″W

Information
- Type: Primary and Secondary Independent
- Motto: Integrity, Achievement, Growth.
- Established: 1959
- Founder: Loyal M Bearss
- President: Eddie Wettach
- Principal: Eddie Wettach
- Grades: K2 through 12
- Enrollment: 1,183
- Colors: Navy, silver, and white
- Athletics: Baseball, Basketball, Cross-Country, Dance/Cheer, Football, Golf, Soccer, Softball, Swimming, Tennis, Track, Volleyball
- Mascot: Raiders
- Nickname: JA
- Accreditation: SACS, SAIS
- Yearbook: Reflections
- Affiliations: NAIS, MAIS
- Website: Official Website

Jackson Academy is a private school in Jackson, Mississippi founded by Loyal M. Bearrs in 1959. Bearrs claimed he established the school to teach using an accelerated phonics program he developed, but the school remained completely racially segregated until 1986, even forgoing tax exemption in 1970 to avoid having to accept Black students.

Today, the school enrolls nearly 1200 students in grades K3 through 12, making it one of the largest independent schools in Mississippi.

== History ==
In 1959, Loyal Bearss and ten families founded Jackson Academy, with the mission to teach children reading through the use of Bearss' phonics method, Beginning Phonics, developed while Bearss was working as a director of the speech and hearing clinic at University of Southern Mississippi, and as a faculty member at Millsaps College.

By November 1960, JA was a private school corporation, jointly owned by the parents of its 49 students, and supervised by a board of directors elected from those parents. The school served kindergarten (then called primer) and first through fifth grade. By the early 1970’s the school offered classes up to the ninth grade. In the early 1980’s the school added classes to the twelfth grade.

In 2008, JA started working towards becoming an Apple one-to-one environment. In 2014, the school was selected as an Apple Distinguished School, and maintains a 100% Apple Teacher certification, while providing all students in K5 through 12th grade with Apple devices for digital learning.

The academy's board of trustees established the James Peter Jernberg, Jr. Scholars program in 2014. The scholarship provides up to full tuition and fees for several students a year, and is named for President Emeritus Peter Jernberg, who led the school from 1988 to 2014.

=== Racial segregation ===
For the 1965–1966 school year, 41% of Jackson Academy's tuition revenue came from grants provided by the state of Mississippi. In 1969, in Coffey v. State Educational Finance Commission, the United States District Court for the Southern District of Mississippi ruled that, since, in the court's opinion, Jackson Academy would refuse to admit qualified Black students, the tuition grant program violated the equal protection clause of the fourteenth amendment.

Jackson Academy's enrollment tripled in 1970 when the Supreme Court, in Alexander v. Holmes County Board of Education, ordered Jackson public schools to desegregate. Because the school did not have a race blind admissions policy, the IRS revoked their tax exempt status.

In 1973, the FCC was asked to revoke WLBT's broadcasting license because the station's largest shareholder, William Mounger, also served as a Jackson Academy Vice President. The FCC filing stated that, since Mounger was affiliated with an institution that practiced racial segregation, he was not fit to hold a broadcasting license. In 1974, the FCC rejected the complaint as untimely since the evidence of Mounger's association with the school and the school's discriminatory practices was available from at least 1969.

In April 1979, Jackson Academy's campus was damaged in the Jackson Easter flood. The school resumed classes in temporary facilities provided by local churches. Jackson Academy vacated the churches after a civil rights attorney filed a lawsuit to revoke the churches' tax-exempt status since the churches were aiding a racially segregated school. The attorney who filed the IRS complaint, Frank Parker, recalled that he received so many threats of violence that he had to leave Mississippi for several weeks.

As of 1982, no African-Americans had ever applied to or attended Jackson Academy. The headmaster at the time, Glenn Cain, explained "People of like kind educate better together."

In 1986 Jackson Academy became the first segregation academy in the Jackson area to enroll black students. Cain was succeeded by Jernberg as headmaster in 1988.

In 2001, Jackson Academy had its first black graduate.

As of 2009, the school was over 98% white, whereas Jackson city schools were 97.6% black.

In the 2017–18 school year, Jackson Academy had 1,183 students. Not including pre-K, the students were 85% white, 13.4% black, and 1% Asian, with the remaining percentage split between Hispanic students and students of two or more races.

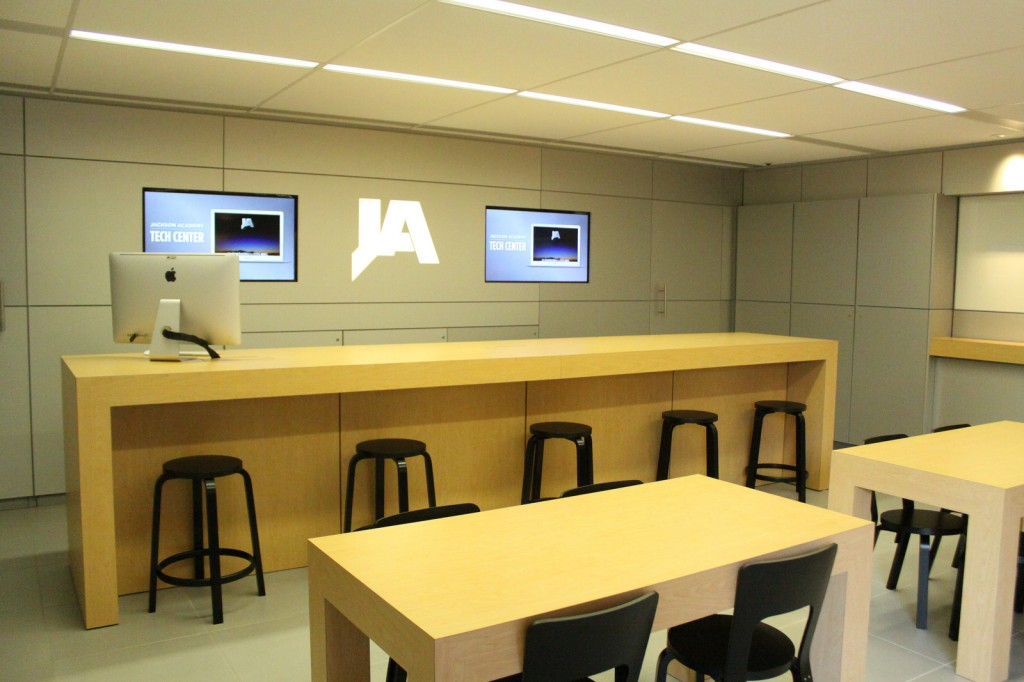
Technology center

== Affiliations ==
Jackson Academy is accredited by Southern Association of Colleges and Schools.

Jackson Academy is part of the Midsouth Association of Independent Schools (MAIS), a consortium of schools in Mississippi, Tennessee, Louisiana and Arkansas that governs athletic competition for its member schools. Previously named the Mississippi Private School Association (MPSA), the organization was initially founded in 1968 as an accrediting agency for segregation academies. In 2019, the organization became the Mississippi Association of Independent Schools, then the Midsouth Association of Independent Schools. They are also a member of District V of Cum Laude Society, one of four Mississippi schools with the chapter designation.

== Performing arts ==
In 2010, Jackson Academy opened an 800-seat performing arts center.

Jackson Academy has two competitive show choirs, the high school-aged group "Encore" and the middle school-aged group "Showtime". The program hosts an annual competition.

== Athletics ==
In 1988, Jackson Academy's football team's road game against San Marino High School was referred to as the "porcelain bowl" because of both school's overwhelmingly white student population.

In 1989, a retired NFL player, Glenn Collins, was the color commentator for Jackson Academy football radio broadcasts. Collins, who is black, was instructed by Jackson Academy athletic director Bobby West not to attend the game to be played at East Holmes Academy on account of his race. When he was later interviewed about his action, West attempted to cast blame onto a supposed third party whom he refused to name, explaining that he had "passed along the information given" to him, disclosing neither the source nor substance of any such "information."

Jackson Academy currently fields 23 athletics teams, 10 male and 13 female. JA's football team, which competes in the Midsouth Association of Independent Schools, won nine MAIS titles from 1995 to 2016.

The girls' volleyball team has won six titles since 2014 (including back-to-back titles in 2019 and 2020), and has played in every MAIS championship match since 2012.

In 2018, girls' basketball coach Jan Sojourner celebrated her 900th win. In her 36 seasons at Jackson Academy, Sojourner has coached her teams to 22 championships, including six MAIS titles.

In 2025, the Raider’s football team led by senior quarterback Josef Walker won the overall state football title against Hartfield Academy with a score of 50-14.

== Alumni ==
- Brunson Green, film producer and Academy Award nominee for the movie The Help.
- Dakota Jordan, professional baseball player
- Dr. Calvin Thigpen, physician and oncologist
- Lardarius Webb Jr., NFL cornerback for the Baltimore Ravens
