= List of United States federal courthouses in Mississippi =

Following is a list of current and former courthouses of the United States federal court system located in Mississippi. Each entry indicates the name of the building along with an image, if available, its location and the jurisdiction it covers, the dates during which it was used for each such jurisdiction, and, if applicable the person for whom it was named, and the date of renaming. Dates of use will not necessarily correspond with the dates of construction or demolition of a building, as pre-existing structures may be adapted or court use, and former court buildings may later be put to other uses. Also, the official name of the building may be changed at some point after its use as a federal court building has been initiated.

== Courthouses ==
| Courthouse | City | Image | Street address | Jurisdiction | Dates of use | Named for |
|---|---|---|---|---|---|---|
| U.S. Post Office and Court House^{†} | Aberdeen | | 201 W. Commerce St. | N.D. Miss. | 1888–1974; Now the Monroe County Chancery Court. | n/a |
| Thomas G. Abernethy Federal Building | Aberdeen | | 301 West Commerce Street | N.D. Miss. | 1971–present | U.S. Rep. Thomas Abernethy |
| U.S. Post Office, Court House, & Custom House† | Biloxi | | 140 Lameuse Street | S.D. Miss. | 1908–1959; Now Biloxi City Hall. | n/a |
| Federal Building and Post Office | Biloxi | | 135 Main Street | S.D. Miss. | 1959–? Still in use as a Post Office | n/a |
| U.S. Post Office | Clarksdale | | ? | N.D. Miss. | 1916–1964; Razed in 1968. | n/a |
| Federal Building | Clarksdale | | 236 Sharkey Avenue | N.D. Miss. | 1964–1997; Still in use by the Post Office and other government offices | n/a |
| Federal Building | Greenville | | 305 Main Street | N.D. Miss. | 1960–present | n/a |
| Dan M. Russell Jr. Federal Bldg & U.S. Courthouse | Gulfport | | 2012 15th Street | S.D. Miss. | 2003–present | District Court judge Dan Monroe Russell, Jr. |
| U.S. Court House† | Hattiesburg | | 200 West Pine Street | S.D. Miss. | 1939–? Completed in 1910; now the Hattiesburg Municipal Court | n/a |
| William M. Colmer Federal Building & U.S. Courthouse | Hattiesburg | | 701 Main Street | S.D. Miss. | ?–present | U.S. Rep. William M. Colmer |
| U.S. Court House & Post Office | Jackson | | Capital & West streets | S.D. Miss. | 1885–1933; Demolished in 1933 | n/a |
| James Eastland Federal Building | Jackson | | 245 East Capitol Street | S.D. Miss. 5th Cir. | 1934–2011 | U.S. Sen. James Eastland (1984) |
| Thad Cochran U.S. Courthouse | Jackson | | 501 East Court Street | S.D. Miss. | 2011–present | U.S. Sen. Thad Cochran |
| U.S. Post Office & Courthouse | Meridian | | 8th Street and 22nd Avenue | S.D. Miss. | 1898–1933; Razed in the 1950s. | n/a |
| U.S. Post Office & Courthouse^{†} | Meridian | | 2100 9th Street | S.D. Miss. | 1933–2012 | n/a |
| U.S. Courthouse† | Natchez | | 109 Pearl Street | S.D. Miss. | 2007–present Built in 1853 | n/a |
| U.S. Court House & Post Office | Oxford | | 107 Courthouse Square | N.D. Miss. | 1887–ca. 1974; Now Oxford City Hall. | n/a |
| Federal Building, Post Office, and Courthouse | Oxford | | 911 Jackson Avenue East | N.D. Miss. | 1973–present | n/a |
| U.S. Court House, Post Office & Custom House | Vicksburg | | 1400 Walnut Street | S.D. Miss. | 1892–1937; Now in use by the Mississippi River Commission. | n/a |
| U.S. Post Office & Court House | Vicksburg | | 820 Crawford Street | S.D. Miss. | 1937–? Now privately owned. | n/a |

== Key ==
| ^{†} | Listed on the National Register of Historic Places (NRHP) |
| ^{††} | NRHP-listed and also designated as a National Historic Landmark |

== See also ==
- List of United States federal courthouses
