= East Holmes Academy =

Defunct segregation academy in Mississippi

Location
- 17637 Emory Road, West, Mississippi 39192; 33.2001165°N 89.7888618°W

Information
- Type: Private
- Opened: 1965
- Founder: Frank Drake
- Closed: 2006
- Grades: K-12
- Campus size: 23 acres (9.3 ha)
- Campus type: Rural
- Colors: Red; White; Royal Blue
- Teams: Raiders
- Rival: Heritage Academy
- Website: web.archive.org/*/http://www.mpsa.org/eha.html
- Last updated: December 2, 2017

East Holmes Academy (EHA) was a segregation academy in West, Mississippi. The school was founded in 1965 and closed in 2006. In 1989, EHA received national attention after two incidents involving alleged racial discrimination.

== History ==
=== Founding ===
In 1965, Holmes county public schools began to desegregate with limited busing programs. As a result, parents began withdrawing their children from public schools and sending them to all white private schools like EHA.

In 1969 the trend accelerated when the Supreme Court issued a ruling ordering Holmes county public schools to desegregate immediately. In the 1969–1970 school year, almost every white teacher in Holmes County left the public school system to rejoin their students at segregated private schools. EHA's first board chair, Frank Drake, formerly taught at Inverness High School.

=== Tuition grants ===
For the 1968–69 school year, EHA charged $300 (equivalent to $2,778 in 2025) for tuition. A tuition grant program administered by the State of Mississippi provided vouchers of up to $240, covering 80% of that amount. For the 1965–1966 school year, the grant program provided 95% of EHA's tuition revenue. In 1969, in the case Coffey v. State Educational Finance Commission, the United States District Court for the Southern District of Mississippi ruled that since, in the court's opinion, EHA would refuse to admit qualified black students, the tuition grant program violated the Equal Protection Clause of the Fourteenth Amendment.

=== Loss of tax exempt status ===
The Internal Revenue Service revoked EHA's tax exempt status in 1970 after the IRS concluded that the school had failed to adopt racially non-discriminatory admissions policies. The IRS announcement noted that since EHA had been unwilling to conform with IRS requirements for nondiscriminatory admissions, donations to the school would lose their tax deductible status. As of 1982, EHA had not regained its tax exempt status.

=== 1989 football incidents ===
There were two racial controversies associated with EHA during the 1989 Mississippi Private School Association football season.

==== Exclusion of black broadcaster ====
In the first controversy, EHA was reported to have asked an opposing school not to bring a black radio broadcaster to a game played at EHA. The broadcaster, Glen Collins, was a former NFL player who was working as a color commentator for WJXN in Jackson. The Jackson Academy athletic director, Bobby West was reported to have told Collins' colleague Lee Adams that "Glen was not welcome up there [at East Holmes] because he was black."

Adams said that he was incredulous that Collins was asked not to attend the August 25 game, stating Collins was "best person for the job" regardless of his race and that he "thought we were past all that other stuff." Collins told the AP that after the incident, he made excuses not to broadcast other games at all white private academies.

==== Offer to forfeit against integrated opponent ====
In the second controversy, EHA offered to forfeit a football game because the other school had a black player. The other school, Heritage Academy, was the first school in the MPSA north central AA conference to add a black player when it recruited running back Scott Fuller to transfer schools during the 1989 football season. EHA claimed that its offer to forfeit the game was due to injuries, not race. The EHA headmaster told The Clarion-Ledger "If we don't [play] it won't be because of that black." Many rejected EHA's claims as untruthful, with the Heritage Academy coach calling the claims "a bunch of bull."

The Clarion Ledger reported that the decision to forfeit had been made by the whole board of directors. The headmaster, Frank Drake, declined to comment on motivation of the board's decision, saying that "sometimes decisions are nobody's business." The president of the MPSA said that if EHA violated the association's anti-discrimination policy, EHA would be expelled.

In a 1990 retrospective interview, EHA board member Joe McClellan acknowledged that race was the motivation for the offer to forfeit. McClellan claimed that Heritage Academy "has a reputation for recruiting blacks", so the EHA board felt that it "had to say something." McClellan explained that the EHA board did not "hate blacks" and commented that "integration has only been around a few decades. Were our forefathers so wrong?"

After EHA announced its decision, seven players and two board members resigned. One former player told the Chicago Tribune that the EHA coach had told the team "we didn't want to play Heritage because we didn't want to advertise that blacks could come to the school." One of the board members who left, Frank Janous, told the Clarion-Ledger "I just felt a bad decision was being made, and I didn't want to be part of it."

EHA ultimately reconsidered its decision to forfeit and visited Heritage Academy to play the game on October 20, 1989. EHA lost the game 7–0.

==== Aftermath ====
Many parents withdrew their children from EHA after the 1989 controversies. A total of 28 students withdrew from EHA and enrolled in Kosciusko public schools. Additional students transferred to other private schools. One parent who withdrew his son told The Clarion-Ledger that, as a result of the incident, he was no longer willing "to support the school with our kids and our money". The Clarion-Ledger also reported that faculty and staff at EHA who opposed the board's decision were forced to leave their positions.

Several months after the football game, Scott Fuller played in a basketball game for Heritage Academy at EHA. Fuller told The Clarion-Ledger that he felt awkward when EHA students shouted "there he is" when Fuller entered the gym. Fuller added that EHA headmaster Frank Drake stared him down during the game, but the two did not exchange words. If the two did talk, Fuller wanted to tell Drake that he hoped Drake "had changed his views about blacks and whites".

=== Closure ===
EHA shut down in May 2006. Many students transferred to Central Holmes Academy or Winona Academy.

== Campus ==
After its founding in 1965, EHA initially operated out of temporary quarters provided by the Durant Baptist Church. Around 1969, EHA's high school moved into a former public school for black students.
