= Justice Hill (disambiguation) =

Justice Hill (born November 14, 1997) is an American football running back. Justice Hill may also refer to:

- Richard Hill (Pennsylvania politician) (c. 1652–1729), associate justice of the provincial Pennsylvania Supreme Court
- John Hill (Texas politician) (1923–2007), chief justice of the Texas Supreme Court
- Harold N. Hill (1930–2010), associate justice of the Supreme Court of Georgia
- H. Warner Hill (died 1934), associate justice of the Supreme Court of Georgia
- John Hill (died 1408), English Member of Parliament and justice of the King's Bench
- Joseph M. Hill (1864–1950), chief justice of the Arkansas Supreme Court
- Matthew W. Hill (1894–1989), associate justice of the Washington Supreme Court
- Sir Robert Hill of Shilston, justice of the Common Pleas from 1408 to 1423
- Robert Andrews Hill (1817–1879), associate justice of the Supreme Court of the District of Columbia
- Thomas Hill, Chief Justice of the Leeward Islands at Montserrat, c. 1822–c. 1825
- William A. Hill (1864–1932), associate justice of the Colorado Supreme Court
- William C. Hill (1917–1998), associate justice of the Vermont Supreme Court
- William U. Hill (born 1948), associate justice of the Wyoming Supreme Court

== See also ==
- Judge Hill (disambiguation)
