= Judge Kendall =

Judge Kendall may refer to:

- Elton Joe Kendall (born 1954), judge of the United States District Court for the Northern District of Texas
- Virginia Mary Kendall (born 1962), judge of the United States District Court for the Northern District of Illinois
