= West, Mississippi =

- Town
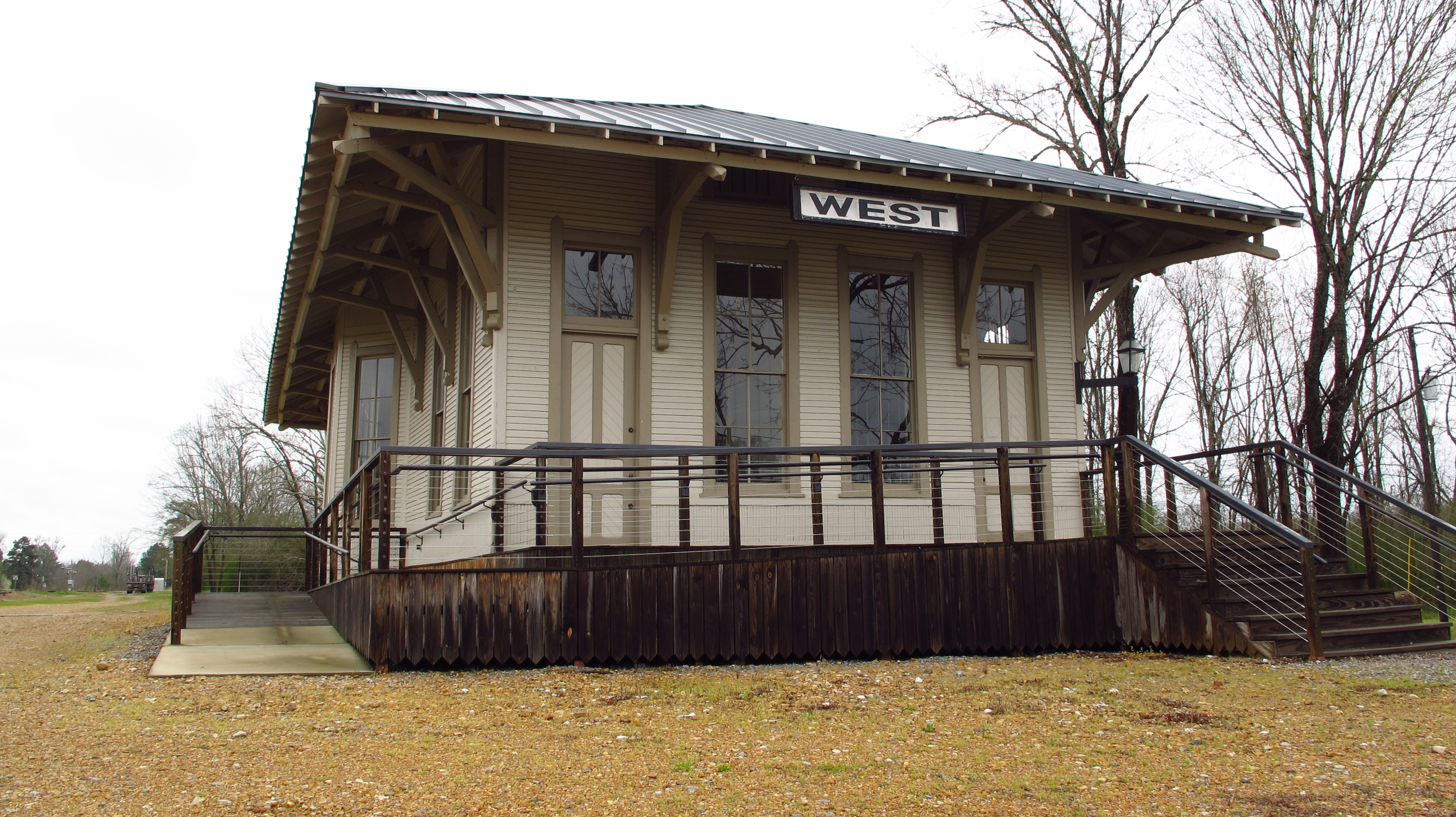
- Train depot

- Location of West, Mississippi

- Location in the United States
- Coordinates: 33°11′49″N 89°46′38″W
- Country: United States
- State: Mississippi
- County: Holmes

Government
  - Mayor: Michael Fancher

Area
  - Total: 0.56 sq mi (1.44 km^{2})
  - Land: 0.56 sq mi (1.44 km^{2})
  - Water: 0 sq mi (0.00 km^{2})
- Elevation: 292 ft (89 m)

Population (2020)
  - Total: 153
  - Density: 274.4/sq mi (105.96/km^{2})
- Time zone: UTC-6 (Central (CST))
  - Summer (DST): UTC-5 (CDT)
- ZIP code: 39192
- Area code: 662
- FIPS code: 28-78680
- GNIS feature ID: 679466

West is a town in northeastern Holmes County, Mississippi, United States. Per the 2020 census, the population was 153. The Mayor of West, MS as of December 2020 is Michael Fancher.

== History ==
West made national news in 1989 when all-white East Holmes Academy, now closed but formerly located in West, initially refused to play a football game against Heritage Academy because Heritage had a black player. After seven East Holmes players quit the team, two board members resigned and the Mississippi Private School Association threatened to eject the school, East Holmes relented.

== Geography ==
West is bordered to the east by the Big Black River, which is also the Attala County line. West is the easternmost municipality in Holmes county.

U.S. Route 51 passes through the center of town, leading north 10 miles (16 km) to Vaiden and south 9 miles (14 km) to Durant. Interstate 55 passes 3 miles (5 km) west of town, with access from Exit 164 (Emory Road). I-55 leads south 70 miles (110 km) to Jackson, the state capital, and north 140 miles (230 km) to Memphis, Tennessee. Mississippi Highway 19 leads 17 miles (27 km) southeast from West to Kosciusko.

According to the United States Census Bureau, the town of West has a total area of 0.54 square miles (1.4 km^{2}), all land.

== Demographics ==
Historical population
| Census | Pop. | Note | %± |
|---|---|---|---|
| 1880 | 200 | | — |
| 1900 | 196 | | — |
| 1910 | 276 | | 40.8% |
| 1920 | 236 | | −14.5% |
| 1930 | 370 | | 56.8% |
| 1940 | 402 | | 8.6% |
| 1950 | 354 | | −11.9% |
| 1960 | 282 | | −20.3% |
| 1970 | 305 | | 8.2% |
| 1980 | 253 | | −17.0% |
| 1990 | 184 | | −27.3% |
| 2000 | 220 | | 19.6% |
| 2010 | 185 | | −15.9% |
| 2020 | 153 | | −17.3% |
U.S. Decennial Census; 2010 2020

=== 2020 census ===
West town, Mississippi – Demographic Profile (NH = Non-Hispanic)
| Race / Ethnicity | Pop 2010 | Pop 2020 | % 2010 | % 2020 |
|---|---|---|---|---|
| White alone (NH) | 88 | 80 | 47.47% | 52.29% |
| Black or African American alone (NH) | 97 | 68 | 52.43% | 44.44% |
| Native American or Alaska Native alone (NH) | 0 | 0 | 0.00% | 0.00% |
| Asian alone (NH) | 0 | 2 | 0.00% | 1.31% |
| Pacific Islander alone (NH) | 0 | 0 | 0.00% | 0.00% |
| Some Other Race alone (NH) | 0 | 0 | 0.00% | 0.00% |
| Mixed Race/Multi-Racial (NH) | 0 | 2 | 0.00% | 1.31% |
| Hispanic or Latino (any race) | 0 | 1 | 0.00% | 0.65% |
| Total | 185 | 153 | 100.00% | 100.00% |

Note: the US Census treats Hispanic/Latino as an ethnic category. This table excludes Latinos from the racial categories and assigns them to a separate category. Hispanics/Latinos can be of any race.

=== 2000 Census ===
As of the census of 2000, there were 220 people, 94 households, and 64 families residing in the town. The population density was 394.6 inhabitants per square mile (152.4/km^{2}). There were 113 housing units at an average density of 202.7 units per square mile (78.3 units/km^{2}). The racial makeup of the town was 56.36% White, 42.73% African American, 0.45% Asian, and 0.45% from two or more races. Hispanic or Latino of any race were 2.27% of the population.

There were 94 households, out of which 26.6% had children under the age of 18 living with them, 54.3% were married couples living together, 13.8% had a female householder with no husband present, and 30.9% were non-families. 29.8% of all households were made up of individuals, and 20.2% had someone living alone who was 65 years of age or older. The average household size was 2.34 and the average family size was 2.88.

In the town, the population was spread out, with 22.7% under the age of 18, 7.7% from 18 to 24, 25.9% from 25 to 44, 18.6% from 45 to 64, and 25.0% who were 65 years of age or older. The median age was 40 years. For every 100 females, there were 91.3 males. For every 100 females age 18 and over, there were 88.9 males.

The median income for a household in the town was $25,625, and the median income for a family was $45,625. Males had a median income of $22,083 versus $12,396 for females. The per capita income for the town was $18,398. About 14.9% of families and 20.9% of the population were below the poverty line, including 20.9% of those under the age of eighteen and 31.2% of those 65 or over.

== Education ==
The town of West is served by the Holmes County School District.
