= United States v. Ike Brown =

In 2006, the United States Department of Justice alleged in United States v. Ike Brown that the Noxubee County Democratic Executive Committee, in Noxubee County, Mississippi, headed by Ike Brown, had violated the Voting Rights Act of 1965 (VRA) with regards to the county's white minority. The suit alleged that Brown, the chairman of the Committee, had conspired to orchestrate "relentless racial discrimination" against white voters. This was the first time the VRA had been used to allege discrimination against whites.

On June 29, 2007, United States District Judge Tom S. Lee ruled that Brown (a twice-convicted felon), in conjunction with the Noxubee Democratic Executive Committee, had "manipulated the political process in ways specifically intended and designed to impair and impede participation of white voters and to dilute their votes." The 104-page opinion held that the Voting Rights Act is a colorblind statute and protects all voters from racial discrimination, regardless of the race of the voter. The Court ruled that the Noxubee County Democratic Party had an illegal intent to discriminate against white voters in violation of Section 2 of the VRA.

The United States entered in a consent decree with the Noxubee County superintendent of general elections, administrator of absentee ballots, registrar, and the county government. The consent decree prohibited a wide range of discriminatory and illegal voting practices, and required these officials to report such incidents if they received information that they were continuing. This consent decree was approved by the district court and filed simultaneously with the filing of the complaint. Brown told The New York Times that he had not signed any such papers.
