= Kristi Johnson =

Kristi Johnson may refer to:

- Kristi Overton Johnson (born 1970), American water skiing champion, author, and missionary
- Kristi Haskins Johnson, Solicitor General of Mississippi
