= Daniel Jordan =

Daniel Jordan may refer to:

- Daniel P. Jordan III (born 1964), American judge
- Daniel P. Jordan (historian), American historian
- Daniel Ben Jordan (1934–1987), American Mormon fundamentalist
