= Coffey v. State Educational Finance Commission =

- Court: S.D. Miss
- Full case name: Mildred COFFEY et al., Plaintiffs, United States of America, Plaintiff-Intervenor, v. STATE EDUCATIONAL FINANCE COMMISSION et al., Defendants, State of Mississippi, Added Defendant
- Decided: January 29 1969
- Citation: 296 F. Supp. 1389

Holding
- order enjoining the payment of tuition grants

Case opinions
- Majority: Golbold; Cox; Russell

Laws applied
- Civil Rights Act of 1964

Keywords
- Segregation academies

Coffey v. State Educational Finance Commission (1969) was a federal case that addressed state support of segregation academies in Mississippi. More broadly, it established the standards the Internal Revenue Service would use to determine the tax-exempt status of private schools based on their segregation policies.

== History ==
The state of Mississippi had supported the establishment of private schools in the wake of Brown v. Board of Education ruling by the US Supreme Court to integrate public schools, by provision of tuition grants to schools that had all-white enrollments. Mississippi negro school children and their parents challenged the state policy in this case. The United States joined as an intervenor, citing violations of §902 of the Civil Rights Act of 1964.

== Arguments ==
Joe Patterson represented Mississippi, arguing before Judges John Golbold, William Cox, and Dan Russell. The gist of the argument in favor of the grants was that they represented "freedom of choice."

During the course of the trial, administrators of twenty-five schools were deposed. Twenty-four were segregation academies, recently founded to avoid court-ordered integration. One, Saints Academy in Lexington, Mississippi, was an all-black private school founded in 1918 when public schools were segregated.

The plaintiffs argued successfully that parents were free to choose the school for their children, but that the state should not engage in policy that "will significantly encourage and involve the State in private discriminations."

== Criteria ==
The court in its judgement included the following criteria to identify a segregation academy:

- "The private school began operation the same year public schools in county were desegregated."
- "No Negro pupils enrolled in the private school."
- "No Negro pupils would be admitted to the private school."

== Aftermath ==
Coffey was aimed specifically at Mississippi. In 1976, the Supreme Court decided Runyon v. McCrary, which declared that segregated private schools nationwide were illegal.

Parents of Mississippi black children subsequently filed suit to revoke federal tax-exemption status for non-profit segregation academies. The case went to the Supreme Court as Coit v. Green (1971), which found against segregation academies. Concurrently, in July 1970, the Internal Revenue Service announced it could "no longer legally justify allowing tax-exempt status to private schools which practice racial discrimination."
