= Judge Hill =

Judge Hill may refer to:

- Delmas Carl Hill (1906–1989), judge of the United States Court of Appeals for the Tenth Circuit
- Irving Hill (1915–1998), judge of the United States District Court for the Central District of California
- James Clinkscales Hill (1924–2017), judge of the United States Courts of Appeals for the Fifth and Eleventh Circuits
- Robert Andrews Hill (1811–1900), judge of the United States District Courts for the Northern and Southern Districts of Mississippi
- Robert Madden Hill (1928–1987), judge of the United States Court of Appeals for the Fifth Circuit
- Samuel B. Hill (Washington politician) (1875–1958), judge of the United States Board of Tax Appeals
- Sara E. Hill (born 1977), judge of the United States District Court for the Northern District of Oklahoma

== See also ==
- Justice Hill (disambiguation)
