= United States Post Office, Courthouse, and Customhouse (Biloxi, Mississippi) =

- U.S. Post Office, Courthouse, and Customhouse
- U.S. National Register of Historic Places
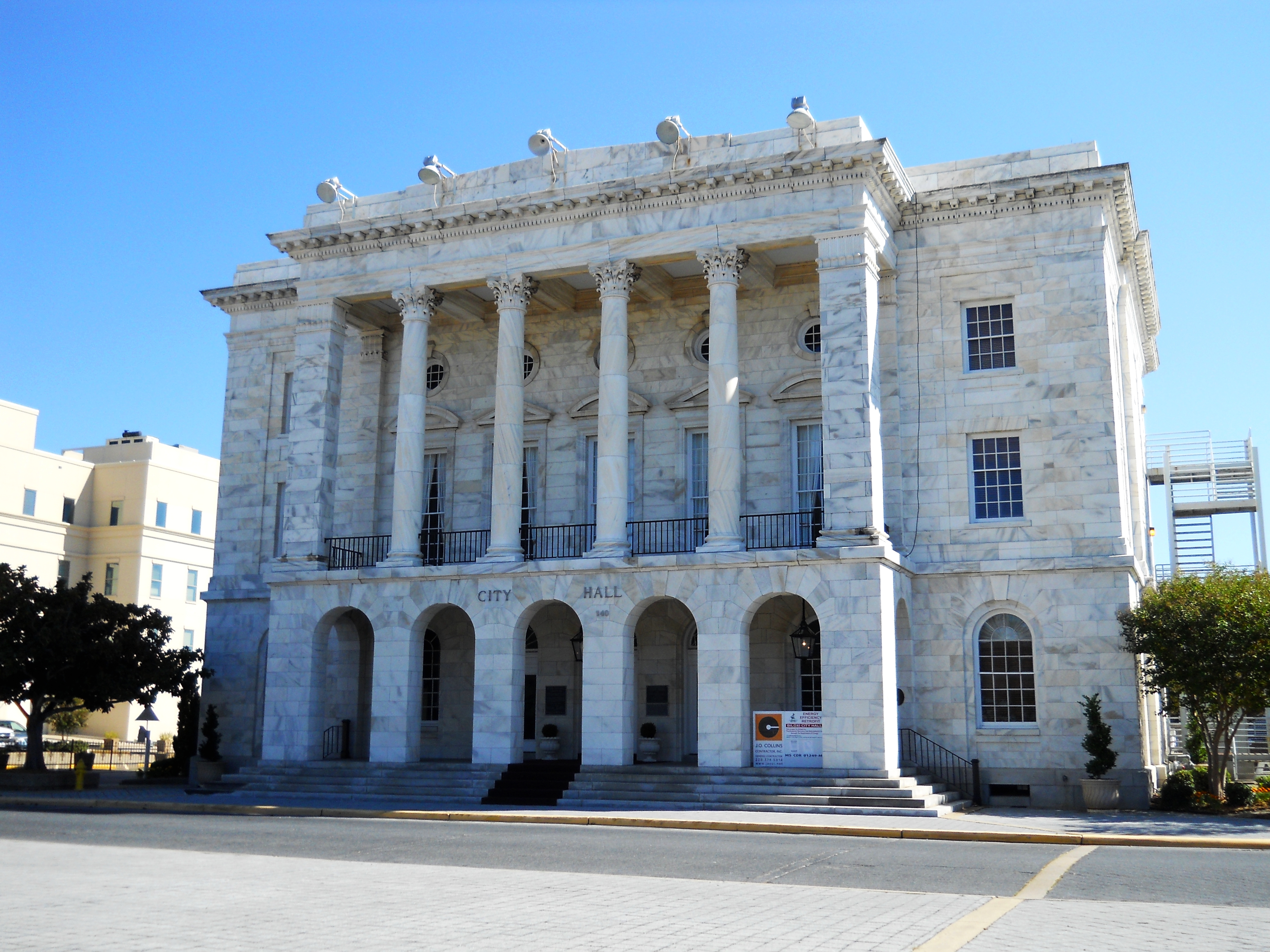

- Location within Mississippi Location within the United States
- Location: 140 Lameuse St., Biloxi, Mississippi
- Coordinates: 30°23′43.43″N 88°53′12.91″W
- Area: 0.5 acres (0.20 ha)
- Built: 1908
- Architect: James Knox Taylor
- Architectural style: Classical Revival
- NRHP reference No.: 78001600
- Added to NRHP: January 30, 1978

The U.S. Post Office, Courthouse, and Customhouse in Biloxi, Mississippi, also known as Biloxi City Hall, was built in 1908. It was designed by James Knox Taylor in Classical Revival style. It served as a courthouse and as a post office, and was listed on the National Register of Historic Places in 1978, when it was being used as Biloxi's city hall.

It served the United States District Court for the Southern District of Mississippi during 1908–1959.

Its first floor was renovated in 1960 and 1964 to be used as City Hall.

== See also ==
- List of United States federal courthouses in Mississippi
