= Keith Starrett =

American judge (born 1951)

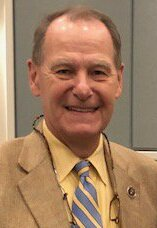
- Starrett in 2019

Senior Judge of the United States District Court for the Southern District of Mississippi
- Incumbent
- Assumed office April 30, 2019

Judge of the United States District Court for the Southern District of Mississippi
- In office December 13, 2004 – April 30, 2019
- Appointed by: George W. Bush
- Preceded by: Charles W. Pickering
- Succeeded by: Kristi Haskins Johnson

Personal details
- Born: Keith Starrett; 1951 (age 74–75) McComb, Mississippi, U.S.
- Education: Mississippi State University (BS); University of Mississippi School of Law (JD)

Keith Starrett (born 1951) is a senior United States district judge of the United States District Court for the Southern District of Mississippi.

== Education and career ==
Born in McComb, Mississippi, Starrett received a Bachelor of Science degree from Mississippi State University in 1972 and a Juris Doctor from the University of Mississippi School of Law in 1974. He was in private practice in Mississippi from 1975 to 1992. He was an assistant district attorney (part-time) of the 14th Circuit Court District of Mississippi in 1981. He was a Circuit Court judge of the 14th Circuit Court District of Mississippi from 1992 to 2004.

== Federal judicial service ==
On July 6, 2004, Starrett was nominated by President George W. Bush to a seat on the United States District Court for the Southern District of Mississippi vacated by Charles W. Pickering. Starrett was confirmed by the United States Senate on November 20, 2004, and received his commission on December 13, 2004. He assumed senior status on April 30, 2019.

In May 2024, NPR revealed that Starrett had failed to disclose receiving free travel to the Beaver Creek Colloquium, a privately funded legal seminar hosted at a resort in Beaver Creek, Colorado in June 2021 on his annual financial disclosure form for that year, in violation of federal ethics law. In response, Starrett told NPR that the omission was an "oversight."

Legal offices
Preceded by Charles W. Pickering	Judge of the United States District Court for the Southern District of Mississippi; 2004–2019	Succeeded by Kristi Haskins Johnson
