= Albert Mayrant Lea =

American lawyer (1848–1901)

- Born: December 10, 1848; Vicksburg, Mississippi
- Died: December 24, 1901 (aged 53); Jackson, Mississippi

Albert Mayrant Lea (December 10, 1848–December 24, 1901) was an American lawyer.

His father Luke Lea was a U.S. commissioner of Indian Affairs, and a U.S. Attorney. In 1871 the Jackson Clarion characterized A. M. Lea as a "carpetbagger" (even though he was Mississippi born and raised). In 1872 he spoke in Vicksburg favor of "Greeley and Brown, and Col. Shelby for Congress." The Mississippi River packet steamboat Albert M. Lea, named in his honor, was launched in 1886. Prior to 1889 he was known as "one of the attorneys in the contest of Hon. James Hill against Catchings." The younger Lea, first appointed by Benjamin Harrison, served as United States Attorney for the Southern District of Mississippi from 1889–1897, with a brief interregnum in 1897 when the office was held by Robert C. Lee and again from 1897 until his death in 1901. He had a stroke and died in Jackson, Mississippi. He was buried in Vicksburg, Mississippi.

The Political Graveyard lists his middle name as Major.
