= Edwin R. Holmes =

American judge (1878–1961)

Senior Judge of the United States Court of Appeals for the Fifth Circuit
- In office November 30, 1954 – December 10, 1961

Judge of the United States Court of Appeals for the Fifth Circuit
- In office March 20, 1936 – November 30, 1954
- Appointed by: Franklin D. Roosevelt
- Preceded by: Nathan Philemon Bryan
- Succeeded by: Benjamin Franklin Cameron

Judge of the United States District Court for the Northern District of Mississippi
- In office October 24, 1918 – March 1, 1929
- Appointed by: Woodrow Wilson
- Preceded by: Henry Clay Niles
- Succeeded by: Seat abolished

Judge of the United States District Court for the Southern District of Mississippi
- In office October 24, 1918 – April 6, 1936
- Appointed by: Woodrow Wilson
- Preceded by: Henry Clay Niles
- Succeeded by: Sidney Carr Mize

Mayor of Yazoo City, Mississippi
- In office 1904–1908
- Preceded by: Edward Luke
- Succeeded by: Edward Luke

Personal details
- Born: Edwin Ruthven Holmes; October 1, 1878 Sidon, Mississippi, U.S.
- Died: December 10, 1961 (aged 83)
- Education: Millsaps College; University of Mississippi; University of Texas School of Law (LLB)

Edwin Ruthven Holmes (October 1, 1878 – December 10, 1961) was a United States circuit judge of the United States Court of Appeals for the Fifth Circuit and previously was a United States district judge of the United States District Court for the Northern District of Mississippi and the United States District Court for the Southern District of Mississippi. He was a lawyer in Yazoo City, Mississippi and served as mayor.

== Education and career ==
Born in Sidon, Mississippi, Holmes graduated from Millsaps College in 1896 and from the University of Mississippi in 1899. He received a Bachelor of Laws from the University of Texas School of Law in Austin, and was in private practice of law in Yazoo City, Mississippi from 1900 to 1918. He was Mayor of Yazoo City from 1904 to 1908.

== Federal judicial service ==
Holmes was nominated by President Woodrow Wilson on October 17, 1918, to a joint seat on the United States District Court for the Northern District of Mississippi and the United States District Court for the Southern District of Mississippi vacated by Judge Henry Clay Niles. He was confirmed by the United States Senate on October 24, 1918, and received his commission the same day. His service in the Northern District terminated on March 1, 1929, due to his reassignment. His service in the Southern District terminated on April 6, 1936, due to his elevation to the Fifth Circuit.

Holmes was nominated by President Franklin D. Roosevelt on August 23, 1935, to a seat on the United States Court of Appeals for the Fifth Circuit vacated by Judge Nathan Philemon Bryan. He was confirmed by the Senate on March 19, 1936, and received his commission on March 20, 1936. He assumed senior status on November 30, 1954. His service terminated on December 10, 1961, due to his death.

== See also ==
- List of United States federal judges by longevity of service

== Sources ==
Legal offices
Preceded by Henry Clay Niles	Judge of the United States District Court for the Northern District of Mississippi; 1918–1929	Succeeded by Seat abolished
Preceded by Henry Clay Niles	Judge of the United States District Court for the Southern District of Mississippi; 1918–1936	Succeeded by Sidney Carr Mize
Preceded by Nathan Philemon Bryan	Judge of the United States Court of Appeals for the Fifth Circuit; 1936–1954	Succeeded by Benjamin Franklin Cameron
