= Henry Travillion Wingate =

American judge (born 1947)

Chief Judge of the United States District Court for the Southern District of Mississippi
- In office 2003–2010
- Preceded by: Tom Stewart Lee
- Succeeded by: Louis Guirola Jr.

Judge of the United States District Court for the Southern District of Mississippi
- Incumbent
- Assumed office October 17, 1985
- Appointed by: Ronald Reagan
- Preceded by: Seat established by 98 Stat. 333

Personal details
- Born: January 6, 1947 (age 79) Jackson, Mississippi, U.S.
- Education: Grinnell College (BA); Yale University (JD)

Henry Travillion Wingate (born January 6, 1947) is a United States district judge of the United States District Court for the Southern District of Mississippi.

== Early life and education ==
Born in Jackson, Mississippi, Wingate received a Bachelor of Arts degree from Grinnell College in 1969 and a Juris Doctor from Yale Law School in 1972. He was a law clerk for Community Legal Aid in Jackson from 1972 to 1973.

== Career ==
Wingate was in private practice in Jackson in 1973. He was a Lieutenant in the Naval Legal Services Office of the United States Navy from 1973 to 1976, serving as a senior assistant defense counsel from 1973 to 1974 and a trial counsel from 1974 to 1976. He was an adjunct instructor at Golden Gate University School of Law from 1975 to 1976. He was an adjunct lecturer at Tidewater Community College in 1976. He was a special assistant attorney general of the State of Mississippi from 1976 to 1980. He was an adjunct professor at the Mississippi College School of Law from 1978 to 1983. He was an assistant district attorney of the Seventh Circuit Court District, State of Mississippi from 1980 to 1984. He joined the United States Naval Reserve in 1983. He was an Assistant United States Attorney of the Southern District of Mississippi from 1984 to 1985.

=== Federal judicial service ===
Wingate was nominated by President Ronald Reagan on September 11, 1985, to the United States District Court for the Southern District of Mississippi, to a new seat created by 98 Stat. 333. He was confirmed by the United States Senate on October 16, 1985, and received his commission on October 17, 1985. He served as Chief Judge from 2003 to 2010.

=== Judicial backlog ===
On September 29, 2016, the U.S. Fifth Circuit Court of Appeals removed Wingate as judge from two cases for continued failure to rule upon pending motions. This was not the first time the Court of Appeals had taken notice of Judge Wingate's judicial backlog; in 2010, the higher court criticized him for taking more than six years to issue a final judgment in a civil case.

=== Notable cases ===
In 2017 Wingate sentenced Chris Epps, former Mississippi Department of Corrections (MDOC) commissioner, to 235 months (19.7 years) for corruption-related crimes. Wingate cited a burglary incident in which Epps, while on bail, attempted to move material from a Flowood, Mississippi residence he previously gave up to the court, as the reason why Wingate gave a sentence that was longer than the one recommended by prosecutors, 13 years.

Over the objections of the NAACP, effective January 1, 2024, Wingate allowed the creation of a new Capitol Complex Improvement District Court in the city of Jackson where the chief justice will be appointed by the Chief Justice of the Mississippi Supreme Court, and the prosecutors by the Mississippi Attorney General.

In July 2025, Wingate withdrew a ruling in the case of Mississippi Association of Educators, et al. vs. Board of Trustees of State Institutions of Higher Learning, et al. after questions were raised about apparent AI "hallucinations" in his ruling. Although Wingate replaced his original ruling with a corrected version, the corrected version cites an apparently nonexistent case. In October 2026, the Fifth Circuit appellate panel reversed his order and removed him from the case entirely.

== See also ==
- List of African-American federal judges
- List of African-American jurists
- List of United States federal judges by longevity of service

== Sources ==
Legal offices
| Preceded by Seat established by 98 Stat. 333 | Judge of the United States District Court for the Southern District of Mississippi; 1985–present | Incumbent |
| Preceded by Tom Stewart Lee | Chief Judge of the United States District Court for the Southern District of Mississippi; 2003–2010 | Succeeded by Louis Guirola Jr. |
