= Freedom of Choice (schools) =

Freedom of Choice, or Free transfer plan, was the name for a number of plans developed in the United States during 1965–1970, aimed at the integration of schools in states that had a segregated educational system.

== Background ==
Freedom of Choice plans were closely tied to the broader Civil Rights movement and the growing effort from the federal government to desegregated American society. Ten years after the US Supreme Court ruled in Brown II (1955) which declared racial segregation within public schools to be unconstitutional. Schools then began racial integration with "all deliberate speed," at the ruling of the Supreme Court of the United States. Many school districts in states with school segregation gave their students the right to choose between white and black schools, independently of their race. The goal of this was to create a public academic environment with greater equality with aims of producing better results for students education as well. In practice, most schools remained segregated, with only a small minority of black students choosing to attend a white school and no white student choosing black schools. The decision was put into the hands of the students and their parents rather than administrators or leaders within the academic field having any meaningful say in regards to what students attended what school.

== Challenge ==
In 1968, three cases (Note: Green v. County School Board, Raney v. Board of Education, Monroe v. Board of Commissioners) were argued before the US Supreme Court on the inadequacy of Freedom of Choice plans. The Supreme Court ruled that if Freedom of Choice, by itself, was not sufficient to achieve integration, as it was in the cases argued, other means had to be used, such as zoning, to achieve the goal. The ruling and its consequences raised strong opposition in many school districts in which that kind of plan had been applied. By the early 1970s, none of the plans remained in effect. In Kent county, the Freedom of Choice plan resulted in a small margin of black students transferring to white schools. This meant upwards of 80 percent of students remained in their segregated schools. White students however didn't transfer to any black schools. This is an example of the challenges of enforcing federal mandates on states that had racism and segregation engrained into their social structures and cultures.

== See also ==
- Alexander v. Holmes County Board of Education
