= James E. Kinkeade =

American judge (born 1951)

Judge of the United States Foreign Intelligence Surveillance Court
- Incumbent
- Assumed office May 19, 2026
- Appointed by: John Roberts
- Preceded by: Louis Guirola Jr.

Judge of the United States District Court for the Northern District of Texas
- Incumbent
- Assumed office November 15, 2002
- Appointed by: George W. Bush
- Preceded by: Elton Joe Kendall

Personal details
- Born: James Edgar Kinkeade; 1951 (age 74–75) Denton, Texas, U.S.
- Education: Baylor University (BA, JD); University of Virginia (LLM)

James Edgar Kinkeade (born 1951) is a United States district judge of the United States District Court for the Northern District of Texas and a judge of the United States Foreign Intelligence Surveillance Court.

== Education and career ==
Born in Denton, Texas, Kinkeade received a Bachelor of Arts from Baylor University in 1973, a Juris Doctor from Baylor Law School in 1974. He then practiced as an associate with Dennis G. Brewer, Inc. from 1974 to 1975, and as a partner at Power & Kinkeade from 1975 to 1980. He also served as an associate municipal judge for the City of Irving, Texas from 1976 to 1980. In 1981 he became a judge on the Dallas County Criminal Court No. 10, and later that year was elevated to the Texas 194th District Court, where he served until 1988. He then served as a justice on the Fifth District Court of Appeals from 1988 to 2002. Throughout his state judicial career he also served as an adjunct professor at Texas Wesleyan School of Law from 1981 to 2002. He received a Master of Laws from the University of Virginia School of Law in 1998. He is also the jurist in residence at Baylor Law School and has served as chairman of the board of trustees of the Baylor Health Care System.

=== Federal judicial service ===
Kinkeade was nominated by President George W. Bush on July 18, 2002, to serve as a United States district judge of the United States District Court for the Northern District of Texas. He was nominated to a seat vacated by Judge Elton Joe Kendall. He was confirmed by the United States Senate on November 14, 2002, and received his commission on November 15, 2002.

Chief Justice John Roberts designated Kinkeade as a judge of the United States Foreign Intelligence Surveillance Court for a term commencing on May 19, 2026 and ending on May 18, 2033.

Legal offices
| Preceded by Elton Joe Kendall | Judge of the United States District Court for the Northern District of Texas; 2002–present | Incumbent |
| Preceded by Louis Guirola Jr. | Judge of the United States Foreign Intelligence Surveillance Court; 2026–present | Incumbent |
