= Henry Clay Niles =

American judge

Judge of the United States District Court for the Northern District of Mississippi Judge of the United States District Court for the Southern District of Mississippi
- In office August 11, 1891 – September 26, 1918
- Appointed by: Benjamin Harrison
- Preceded by: Robert Andrews Hill
- Succeeded by: Edwin R. Holmes

Personal details
- Born: Henry Clay Niles; October 21, 1850 Kosciusko, Mississippi, U.S.
- Died: September 26, 1918 (aged 67) Jackson, Mississippi, U.S.
- Education: read law

Henry Clay Niles (October 21, 1850 – September 26, 1918) was a United States district judge of the United States District Court for the Northern District of Mississippi and the United States District Court for the Southern District of Mississippi.

== Education and career ==
Born in Kosciusko, Mississippi, Niles read law to enter the bar in 1872. He was in private practice in Jackson, Mississippi from 1872 to 1890. He was a member of the Mississippi House of Representatives in 1878, and in 1886. He worked as a Mississippi district attorney. He was United States Attorney for the Northern District of Mississippi from 1890 to 1891.

== Federal judicial service ==
Niles received a recess appointment from President Benjamin Harrison on August 11, 1891, to a joint seat on the United States District Court for the Northern District of Mississippi and the United States District Court for the Southern District of Mississippi vacated by Judge Robert Andrews Hill. He was nominated to the same position by President Harrison on December 10, 1891. He was confirmed by the United States Senate on January 11, 1892, and received his commission the same day. His service terminated on September 26, 1918, due to his death in Jackson.

== Sources ==
Legal offices
| Preceded by Robert Andrews Hill | Judge of the United States District Court for the Northern District of Mississippi; Judge of the United States District Court for the Southern District of Mississippi; 1891–1918 | Succeeded by Edwin R. Holmes |
