= Halil Suleyman Ozerden =

American judge (born December 5, 1966)

Sul Ozerden
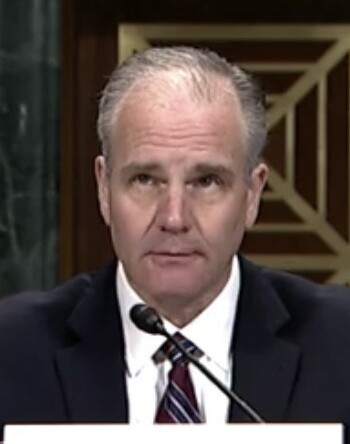
- Ozerden in 2019

Chief Judge of the United States District Court for the Southern District of Mississippi
- Incumbent
- Assumed office November 4, 2024
- Preceded by: Daniel P. Jordan III

Judge of the United States District Court for the Southern District of Mississippi
- Incumbent
- Assumed office May 1, 2007
- Appointed by: George W. Bush
- Preceded by: David C. Bramlette

Personal details
- Born: Halil Suleyman Ozerden; December 5, 1966 (age 59) Hattiesburg, Mississippi, U.S.
- Education: Georgetown University (BS); Stanford University (JD)

Military service
- Allegiance: United States
- Branch/service: United States Navy
- Years of service: 1989–1995
- Rank: Lieutenant
- Battles/wars: Operation Restore Hope Operation Southern Watch
- Awards: Navy and Marine Corps Commendation Medal; Navy and Marine Corps Achievement Medal; Joint Meritorious Unit Award; Southwest Asia Service Medal; Armed Forces Expeditionary Medal; National Defense Service Medal; Navy and Marine Corps Sea Service Ribbon (with bronze service star)

Halil Suleyman "Sul" Ozerden (born December 5, 1966) is the chief United States district judge of the United States District Court for the Southern District of Mississippi and a former nominee to be a circuit judge for the United States Court of Appeals for the Fifth Circuit.

== Early life and education ==
Ozerden was born in Hattiesburg, Mississippi to a Turkish family. He obtained a Bachelor of Science in Foreign Service at Georgetown University's Walsh School of Foreign Service. Ozerden was a four-year Navy ROTC scholarship student, serving as battalion executive officer (1989). Upon receiving his commission as a naval officer, he completed United States Navy Flight School in Pensacola, Florida, from 1989 to 1990, and was designated a naval flight officer. Ozerden obtained his Juris Doctor in 1998 from Stanford Law School, and served as associate editor for the Stanford Law Review.

== Military Service ==
Ozerden served as a commissioned officer in the United States Navy from 1989 to 1995. His military service included: naval flight officer/bombardier-navigator, A-6E Intruder; over 1,000 flight hours; mission commander qualified; two six-month Western Pacific deployments aboard the USS Kitty Hawk; head of Safety Department; Navy Commendation Medal for missions flown in Operation Restore Hope (Somalia) and Operation Southern Watch (Iraq); and the Navy Achievement Medal. He was honorably discharged with the rank of lieutenant (O-3).

== Legal career ==
Ozerden began his legal career as a law clerk to Judge Eldon E. Fallon of the Eastern District of Louisiana from 1998 to 1999 and also served as a private practice attorney licensed in Mississippi from 1999 to 2007.

=== Federal judicial service ===
On the recommendation of United States Senators Thad Cochran and Trent Lott, President George W. Bush nominated Ozerden to be a United States district judge of the Southern District of Mississippi on January 8, 2007. He was confirmed by the United States Senate on April 24, 2007 by a 95–0 vote. He received his commission on May 1, 2007. He became chief judge on November 4, 2024.

In 2023, Ozerden ruled in an anti-vaccine group’s favor after it filed a lawsuit to overturn Mississippi's long-standing, strict vaccination requirements. Ozerden determined the First Amendment to the U.S. Constitution allowed parents to decline vaccinations for their children on religious grounds. Mississippi law, since 1979, had not allowed parents to exempt their children from vaccinations, except for medical reasons. This resulted in Mississippi having one of the highest vaccination rates in the United States, with 99% of kindergarteners immunized.

=== Failed nomination to appellate court ===
On June 11, 2019, President Donald Trump announced his intent to nominate Ozerden to serve as a United States circuit judge for the United States Court of Appeals for the Fifth Circuit. On June 24, 2019, his nomination was sent to the Senate. He was nominated to the seat vacated by E. Grady Jolly, who assumed senior status on October 3, 2017. On July 17, 2019, a hearing on his nomination was held before the Senate Judiciary Committee. On September 12, 2019, Senator Ted Cruz announced his opposition to the nomination. The Judiciary Committee was scheduled to vote on recommending Ozerden on September 26, 2019, but the vote was postponed after Senator Josh Hawley joined Ted Cruz in his opposition to Ozerden's elevation to the court of appeals. On January 3, 2020, his nomination was returned to the President under Rule XXXI, Paragraph 6 of the United States Senate.

== Memberships ==
Ozerden became a member of the Federalist Society in 2019.

== See also ==
- Donald Trump judicial appointment controversies

Legal offices
Preceded by David C. Bramlette	Judge of the United States District Court for the Southern District of Mississippi; 2007–present	Incumbent
Preceded by Daniel P. Jordan III	Chief Judge of the United States District Court for the Southern District of Mississippi; 2024–present	Incumbent
