= 1849 Mississippi gubernatorial election =

- November 5, 1849
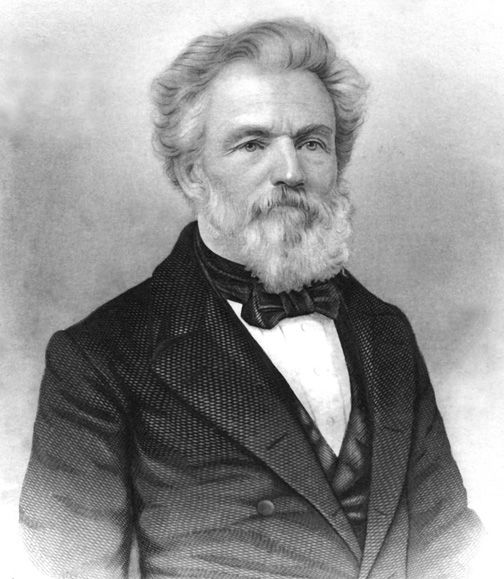

Nominee	John A. Quitman	Luke Lea
Party	Democratic	Whig
Popular vote	33,117	22,996
Percentage	59.02%	40.98%
- County results Quitman: 50–60% 60–70% 70–80% 80–90% 90–100% Lea: 50–60% 60–70% No data/vote
Governor before election
Joseph W. Matthews
Democratic
Elected Governor
John A. Quitman
Democratic

The 1849 Mississippi gubernatorial election was held on November 1, 1849, to elect the governor of Mississippi. John A. Quitman, a Democrat won against Whig Luke Lea, future Commissioner of Indian Affairs in the Department of Interior.

== Background ==
Debates over slavery and state rights continued to dominate the Mississippi political scene. Political leaders called for the defense of slavery and the necessity of secession if further encroachment on the institution of slavery occurred.

== General election ==
Incumbent Governor Joseph Matthews announced he would not run for reelection. The Democrats unanimously nominated John A. Quitman, a staunch defender of nullification, "state sovereignty", and slavery. The Whigs nominated Luke Lea, who was also a defender of slavery but did not believe in secession. However, many Whigs preferred Quitman. Quitman was elected governor by a wide margin, reflecting the political environment at the time.

== Results ==
Mississippi gubernatorial election, 1849
Party	Candidate	Votes	%
Democratic	John A. Quitman	33,117	59.02%
Whig	Luke Lea	22,996	40.98%
Total votes		56,113	100.00
Democratic hold			
