= Luke Lea (American politician, born 1810) =

American politician (1810–1898)

6th Commissioner of Indian Affairs
- In office July 1, 1850 – March 24, 1853
- Preceded by: Orlando Brown
- Succeeded by: George Washington Manypenny

United States Attorney for the Southern District of Mississippi
- In office July 18, 1876 – 1885
- Preceded by: William E. Dedrick
- Succeeded by: J. Bowmar Harris

Personal details
- Born: November 19, 1810 Grainger County, Tennessee
- Died: May 9, 1898 (aged 87) Vicksburg, Mississippi

Luke Lea (November 19, 1810 – May 9, 1898) was an attorney, politician, and public official from southern Mississippi in the United States. Lea was a native of Grainger County, Tennessee. He was a Whig candidate for the state legislature from Hinds County, Mississippi in 1843. He served in the Mississippi legislature in 1844 where he voted against the annexation of Texas.

Lea was the Whig Party candidate in the 1849 Mississippi gubernatorial election, running against John A. Quitman. From 1850 to 1853, he was the sixth U.S. Commissioner of Indian Affairs. As commissioner, "Lea believed Native Americans were just as capable as non-Indians and that they could take their place in the nation as productive citizens. In the interim, he had to deal with Indian wars in Texas and New Mexico, threats of extermination of the border tribes, and the near-annihilation of the California Indians at the hands of gold seekers. Consequently, Lea was under pressure to open the central Plains for American expansion west. While he favored assimilation, dealing with national expansion across the Great Plains became Lea's top priority."

He served as United States Attorney for the Southern District of Mississippi from 1876 until 1885. Albert M. Lea, also a U.S. Attorney for the same district, was his son. Lea died at Vicksburg, Mississippi in 1898.
