= Taylor B. McNeel =

American lawyer (born 1983)

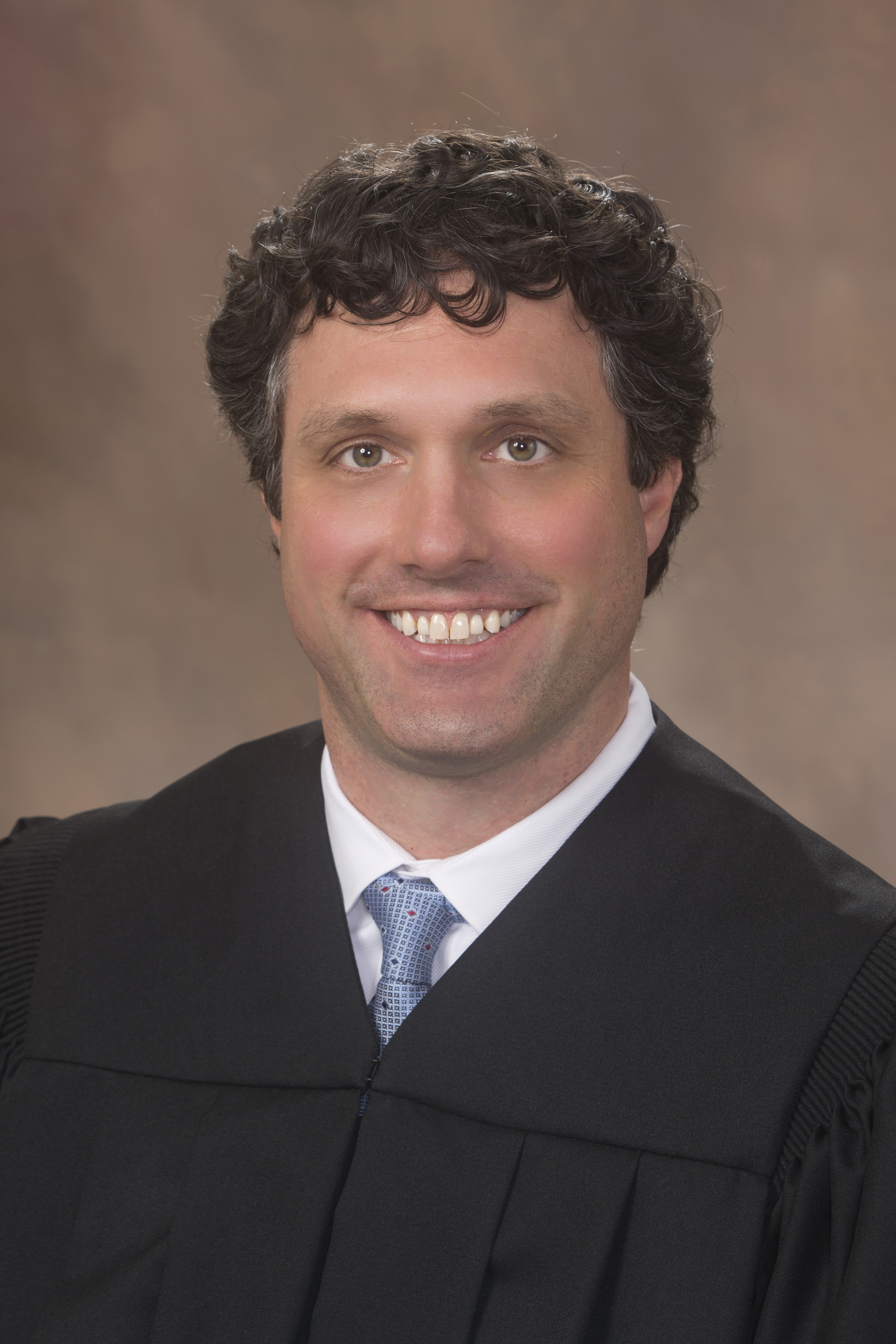

Judge of the United States District Court for the Southern District of Mississippi
- Incumbent
- Assumed office December 14, 2020
- Appointed by: Donald Trump
- Preceded by: Louis Guirola Jr.

Personal details
- Born: 1983 (age 42–43) Louisville, Mississippi, U.S.
- Party: Republican
- Education: University of Mississippi (BBA, JD)

Taylor Brantley McNeel (born 1983) is a United States district judge of the United States District Court for the Southern District of Mississippi.

== Education ==
McNeel earned his Bachelor of Business Administration, cum laude, from the University of Mississippi, and his Juris Doctor, cum laude, from the University of Mississippi School of Law, where he served on the Mississippi Law Journal. At the University of Mississippi, he served as Senior Class President (2004 – 2005) and was on the Varsity Football Team (2001 – 2003). As quarterback of his high school football team, he helped lead the team to its four straight state titles. McNeel was also elected Governor of Mississippi American Legion Boys State (2000) and was an Eagle Scout (1999).

== Career ==
From 2008 to 2020, he was a member at Brunini, Grantham, Grower & Hewes, PLLC, in Biloxi, Mississippi, where his practice focused on complex commercial litigation. He was the Partner in Charge of the Mississippi Gulf Coast office. While in private practice, he was involved in pro bono work, including trying a both a jury trial and a bench trial pro bono.

McNeel was also AV rated by Martindale Hubbard and featured in publications such as Benchmark Litigation and Super Lawyers. He served on the Pascagoula-Gautier School District Board of Trustees from 2019-2020.

=== Federal judicial service ===
On June 15, 2020, President Donald Trump announced his intent to nominate McNeel to serve as a United States district judge of the United States District Court for the Southern District of Mississippi. On July 2, 2020, his nomination was sent to the Senate. President Trump nominated McNeel to the seat vacated by Judge Louis Guirola Jr., who assumed senior status on March 23, 2018. On September 9, 2020, a hearing on his nomination was held before the Senate Judiciary Committee. On October 22, 2020, the Judiciary Committee reported his nomination by a 12–0 vote. On November 30, 2020, the United States Senate invoked cloture on his nomination by a 52–36 vote. On December 1, 2020, his nomination was confirmed by a 53–39 vote. He received his judicial commission on December 14, 2020.

=== Memberships ===
McNeel was involved in a number of professional and bar association committees and organizations. He was also involved with his local Rotary Club, Chamber of Commerce, and other civil and charitable organizations. He is a member of the Federalist Society.

=== Notable Decisions ===
On April 30, 2021, McNeel dismissed most claims in a case filed by a man who was acquitted of manslaughter in the death of his former girlfriend.

On June 28, 2021, McNeel denied a motion for summary judgment and allowed a case to proceed where a young man was allegedly falsely accused of murder and jailed for approximately eight months.

In April 2022, McNeel sentenced a man, who posed as a neurologist, to 2 1/2 years in prison for health care fraud for submitting false statements to Medicare for reimbursement. Restitution in excess of $1.53 million was ordered.

On May 19, 2023, McNeel denied a motion for a temporary restraining order in a case filed by a trans girl against her school district for enforcing a policy requiring boys to wear "boys" clothes to the high school graduation. The student did not appeal.

In February 2024, McNeel dismissed a lawsuit filed by commercial fishers in an attempt to block a quota reduction on amberjack limits. The question involved whether members of a regulatory council were constitutionally appointed pursuant to the Appointments Clause.

Legal offices
Preceded by Louis Guirola Jr.	Judge of the United States District Court for the Southern District of Mississippi; 2020–present	Incumbent
