= Walter Nixon =

American judge (born 1928)

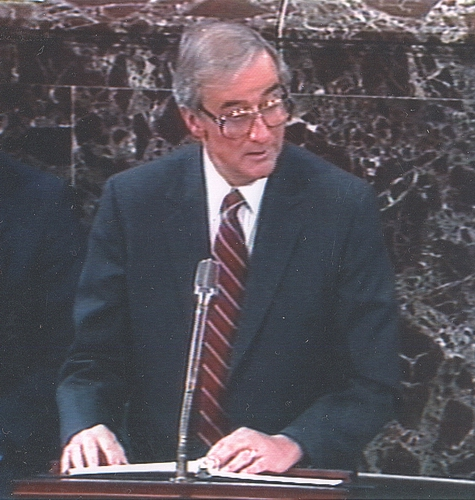

Chief Judge of the United States District Court for the Southern District of Mississippi
- In office September 24, 1982 – November 3, 1989
- Preceded by: Dan Monroe Russell Jr.
- Succeeded by: William H. Barbour Jr.

Judge of the United States District Court for the Southern District of Mississippi
- In office June 7, 1968 – November 3, 1989
- Appointed by: Lyndon B. Johnson
- Preceded by: Seat established
- Succeeded by: Charles W. Pickering

Personal details
- Born: Walter Louis Nixon Jr. December 16, 1928 (age 97) Biloxi, Mississippi, U.S.
- Education: Tulane University (JD)

Walter Louis Nixon Jr. (born December 16, 1928) is a former United States district judge of the United States District Court for the Southern District of Mississippi who in 1989 was impeached by the House of Representatives and removed from office by the Senate. Because Nixon's impeachment was for perjury, the case was cited as a precedent in the impeachment trial of President Bill Clinton.

== Education and career ==
Born in 1928, in Biloxi, Mississippi, Nixon received a Juris Doctor in 1951 from Tulane University Law School. He entered private practice in Biloxi from 1952 to 1968, interrupted by service in the United States Air Force from 1953 to 1955.

== Federal judicial service ==
Nixon was nominated by President Lyndon B. Johnson on May 29, 1968, to the United States District Court for the Southern District of Mississippi, to a new seat authorized by 80 Stat. 75. He was confirmed by the United States Senate on June 6, 1968, and received his commission on June 7, 1968. He served as Chief Judge from 1982 to 1989. His service terminated on November 3, 1989, due to his impeachment and conviction.

== Impeachment ==
Nixon was convicted in 1986 on perjury charges and sentenced to 5 years in prison. The offense stemmed from his grand jury testimony and statements to federal officers concerning his intervention in the state drug prosecution of Drew Fairchild, the son of Wiley Fairchild, a business partner of Nixon. Although the case was assigned to a state court, Wiley Fairchild had asked Nixon to help out by speaking to the prosecutor. Nixon did so, and the prosecutor, a long-time friend, dropped the case. When Nixon was interviewed by the Federal Bureau of Investigation (FBI) and the United States Department of Justice, he denied any involvement whatsoever. Subsequently, a federal grand jury was empaneled and he again denied his involvement. He was convicted of making false statements to a grand jury. In 1989, he was impeached unanimously by the United States House of Representatives, becoming the second of only three unanimous impeachment votes, the others being Harry E. Claiborne and Thomas Porteous, and convicted by the Senate, for committing perjury before a grand jury. Upon his conviction by the Senate, he was removed from office.

Article	Guilty	Not guilty	Result
Article I	89	8	Convicted
Article II	78	19	Convicted
Article III	57	40	Acquitted

Nixon appealed his impeachment and removal to the United States Supreme Court. In Nixon v. United States, handed down in 1993, the Court rejected his appeal as a nonjusticiable political question. He returned to private practice in Mississippi from 1993 to 1998. He has practiced law in Lake Charles, Louisiana since 1998.

== See also ==
- Federal impeachment in the United States
- Alcee Hastings

== Sources ==
- Testimony of Charles J. Cooper before the House Judiciary Committee Subcommittee on the Constitution, November 9, 1998
- Louisiana State Bar directory
- Mississippi Bar directory

Legal offices
New seat	Judge of the United States District Court for the Southern District of Mississippi; 1968–1989	Succeeded by Charles W. Pickering
Preceded by Dan Monroe Russell Jr.	Chief Judge of the United States District Court for the Southern District of Mississippi; 1982–1989	Succeeded by William H. Barbour Jr.
