= William H. Barbour Jr. =

American judge (1941–2021)

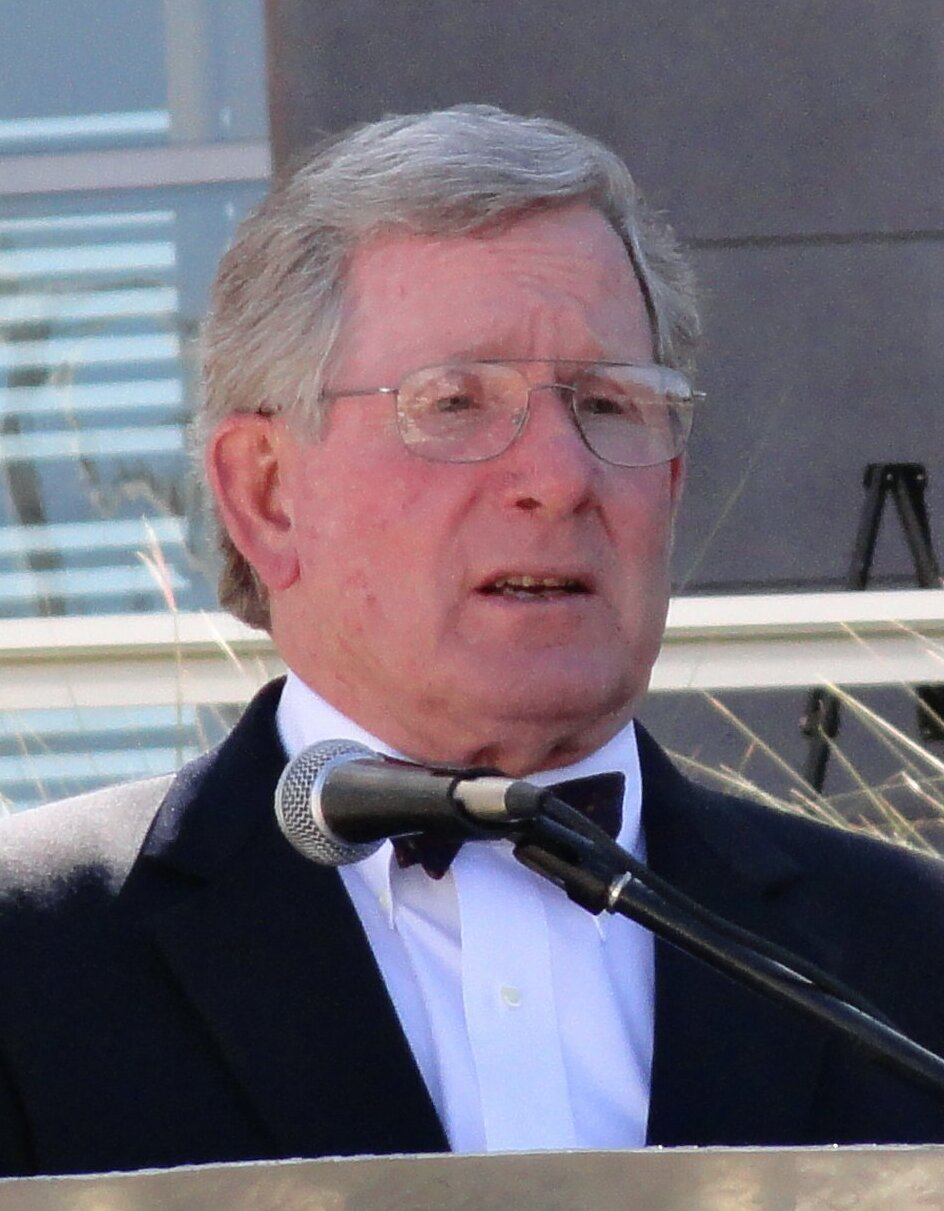
- Barbour in 2018

Senior Judge of the United States District Court for the Southern District of Mississippi
- In office February 4, 2006 – January 8, 2021

Chief Judge of the United States District Court for the Southern District of Mississippi
- In office 1989–1996
- Preceded by: Walter Nixon
- Succeeded by: Tom Stewart Lee

Judge of the United States District Court for the Southern District of Mississippi
- In office April 25, 1983 – February 4, 2006
- Appointed by: Ronald Reagan
- Preceded by: William Harold Cox
- Succeeded by: Carlton W. Reeves

Personal details
- Born: William Henry Barbour Jr. February 4, 1941 Yazoo City, Mississippi, U.S.
- Died: January 8, 2021 (aged 79) Yazoo City, Mississippi, U.S.
- Relatives: Haley Barbour (cousin)
- Education: Princeton University (BA); University of Mississippi (JD)

William Henry Barbour Jr. (February 4, 1941 – January 8, 2021) was a United States district judge of the United States District Court for the Southern District of Mississippi.

== Early life and education ==
Barbour was born in Yazoo City, Mississippi. He received a Bachelor of Arts degree from Princeton University in 1963 where he lettered in football and was a member of The University Cottage Club. He received a Juris Doctor from the University of Mississippi School of Law in 1966 and then attended the Graduate Tax Program at New York University School of Law.

== Career ==
After graduating from law school, Barbour returned to Mississippi. He established his practice with his family's private law firm in Yazoo City, Mississippi from 1966 to 1983, and was also a youth counselor for the Yazoo County Youth Court from 1971 to 1982.

=== Federal judicial service ===
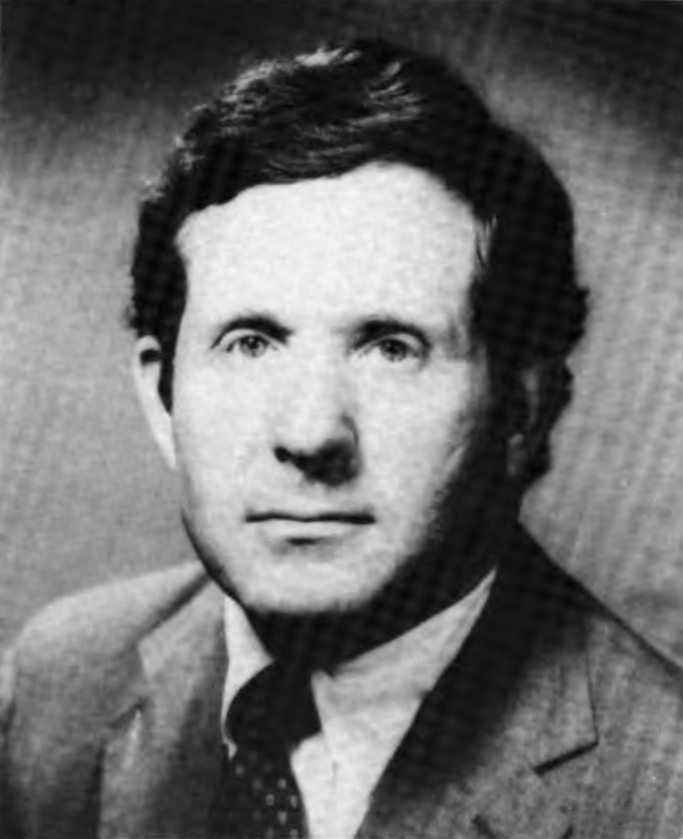
Barbour in the 1980s.

Barbour was nominated by President Ronald Reagan on March 15, 1983, to a seat on the United States District Court for the Southern District of Mississippi vacated by Judge William Harold Cox. He was confirmed by the United States Senate on April 21, 1983, and received his commission on April 25, 1983. He served as Chief Judge from 1989 to 1996, and assumed senior status on February 4, 2006. Barbour indicated that he would take inactive senior status on January 4, 2019, meaning that while he remained a federal judge, he no longer heard cases or participated in the business of the court.

== Personal life ==
Barbour was a cousin and former law partner of Haley Barbour, former Governor of Mississippi.

== Death ==
Barbour died on January 8, 2021, at his home in Yazoo City.

== Sources ==
Legal offices
Preceded by William Harold Cox	Judge of the United States District Court for the Southern District of Mississippi; 1983–2006	Succeeded by Carlton W. Reeves
Preceded by Walter Nixon	Chief Judge of the United States District Court for the Southern District of Mississippi; 1989–1996	Succeeded by Tom Stewart Lee
