= Glen Collins (American football) =

American football player (born 1959)

No. 76, 79
- Position: Defensive end

Personal information
- Born: July 10, 1959 (age 67); Jackson, Mississippi, U.S.
- Listed height: 6 ft 6 in (1.98 m)
- Listed weight: 265 lb (120 kg)

Career information
- High school: Jim Hill (Jackson)
- College: Mississippi State
- NFL draft: 1982: 1st round, 26th overall pick

Career history
- Cincinnati Bengals (1982–1985); Green Bay Packers (1986)*; San Francisco 49ers (1987); Indianapolis Colts (1988)
- * Offseason or practice squad member only

Awards and highlights
- First-team All-American (1981); First-team All-SEC (1981); Second-team All-SEC (1980)

Career NFL statistics
- Sacks: 11
- Fumble recoveries: 2
- Stats at Pro Football Reference

Glen Leon Collins (born July 10, 1959) is an American former professional football player who was a defensive lineman for five seasons with the San Francisco 49ers and Cincinnati Bengals of the National Football League (NFL).

== Professional football career ==
Glen played for the Cincinnati Bengals for four years spanning from 1982 to 1985. He was traded to the San Francisco 49ers in 1986 where he played one year in 1987.

== Broadcasting ==
In 1989, Collins was the color commentator for Jackson Academy football broadcasts. Collins, who is black, was instructed by Jackson Academy athletic director Bobby West not to attend the game to be played at East Holmes Academy on account of his race. When he was later interviewed about his action, West attempted to cast blame onto a supposed third party whom he refused to name, explaining that he had "passed along the information given" to him, disclosing neither the source nor substance of any such "information."
