= David C. Bramlette =

American judge (born 1939)

David Clay Bramlette III
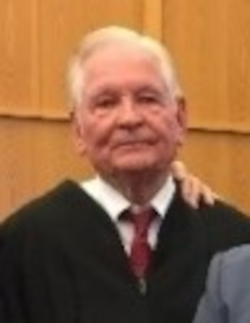

Senior Judge of the United States District Court for the Southern District of Mississippi
- Incumbent
- Assumed office March 20, 2006

Judge of the United States District Court for the Southern District of Mississippi
- In office November 25, 1991 – March 20, 2006
- Appointed by: George H. W. Bush
- Preceded by: Seat established by 104 Stat. 5089
- Succeeded by: Halil Suleyman Ozerden

Personal details
- Born: David Clay Bramlette III; November 27, 1939 (age 86) Woodville, Mississippi, U.S.
- Education: Princeton University (BA); University of Mississippi (JD)

David Clay Bramlette III (born November 27, 1939) is a senior United States district judge of the United States District Court for the Southern District of Mississippi.

== Education and career ==
Bramlette was born in Woodville, Mississippi. He received a Bachelor of Arts degree from Princeton University in 1962 and a Juris Doctor from the University of Mississippi Law School in 1965. He was in private practice in Natchez, Mississippi from 1965 to 1991. He was a special circuit judge of the Sixth Judicial District of Mississippi, from 1977 to 1979, a special chancery court judge, and a judge of the Adams County Court.

=== Federal judicial service ===
On July 26, 1991, Bramlette was nominated by President George H. W. Bush to a new seat on the United States District Court for the Southern District of Mississippi created by 104 Stat. 5089. He was confirmed by the United States Senate on November 21, 1991, and received his commission on November 25, 1991. He assumed senior status on March 20, 2006.

== Sources ==
Legal offices
Preceded by Seat established by 104 Stat. 5089	Judge of the United States District Court for the Southern District of Mississippi; 1991–2006	Succeeded by Halil Suleyman Ozerden
