= Sidney Carr Mize =

American judge

Chief Judge of the United States District Court for the Southern District of Mississippi
- In office 1961–1962
- Preceded by: Office established
- Succeeded by: William Harold Cox

Judge of the United States District Court for the Southern District of Mississippi
- In office February 3, 1937 – April 26, 1965
- Appointed by: Franklin D. Roosevelt
- Preceded by: Edwin R. Holmes
- Succeeded by: Dan Monroe Russell Jr.

Personal details
- Born: Sidney Carr Mize; March 7, 1888 Scott County, Mississippi, U.S.
- Died: April 26, 1965 (aged 77)
- Education: Mississippi College (A.B.); University of Mississippi School of Law (LL.B.)

Sidney Carr Mize (March 7, 1888 – April 26, 1965) was a United States district judge of the United States District Court for the Southern District of Mississippi.

== Education and career ==
Born in Scott County, Mississippi, Mize received an Artium Baccalaureus degree from Mississippi College in 1908 and a Bachelor of Laws from the University of Mississippi School of Law in 1911. He was in private practice in Gulfport, Mississippi from 1911 to 1937. He became a special district attorney of Mississippi in 1914, and special county judge and a special chancery judge in 1930.

== Federal judicial service ==
On January 30, 1937, Mize was nominated by President Franklin D. Roosevelt to a seat on the United States District Court for the Southern District of Mississippi vacated by Judge Edwin R. Holmes. Mize was confirmed by the United States Senate on February 2, 1937, and received his commission on February 3, 1937. He served as Chief Judge from 1961 to 1962, and remained on the court until his death on April 26, 1965.

=== Cases ===
In 1962, Mize ruled that there was no evidence that the University of Mississippi's admissions policy was based on the segregation of races, and therefore was legally correct in denying admittance to James Meredith, a Black applicant. The ruling was later overturned by the Fifth Circuit Court of Appeals, which remanded the case to Mize and instructed him to order Meredith's admission to the University. In his majority opinion, Judge John Minor Wisdom called the handling of the case "a carefully calculated campaign of delay, harassment and masterly inactivity."

== Sources ==
Legal offices
Preceded by Edwin R. Holmes	Judge of the United States District Court for the Southern District of Mississippi; 1937–1965	Succeeded by Dan Monroe Russell Jr.
Preceded by Office established	Chief Judge of the United States District Court for the Southern District of Mississippi; 1961–1962	Succeeded by William Harold Cox
