= Walter J. Gex III =

American judge (1939–2020)

Senior Judge of the United States District Court for the Southern District of Mississippi
- In office March 24, 2004 – November 12, 2020

Judge of the United States District Court for the Southern District of Mississippi
- In office February 26, 1986 – March 24, 2004
- Appointed by: Ronald Reagan
- Preceded by: Seat established by 98 Stat. 333
- Succeeded by: Louis Guirola Jr.

Personal details
- Born: March 29, 1939 Bay St. Louis, Mississippi, U.S.
- Died: November 12, 2020 (aged 81) Diamondhead, Mississippi, U.S.
- Education: University of Mississippi (B.A.); University of Mississippi Law School (LL.B.)

Walter Joseph Gex III (March 29, 1939 – November 12, 2020) was a United States district judge of the United States District Court for the Southern District of Mississippi.

== Education and career ==
Born in Bay St. Louis, Mississippi, Gex received a Bachelor of Arts degree from the University of Mississippi in 1962 and a Bachelor of Laws from the University of Mississippi Law School in 1963. He was in private practice in Jackson, Mississippi from 1963 to 1972, and then in Bay St. Louis from 1972 to 1986.

== Federal judicial service ==
On January 29, 1986, Gex was nominated by President Ronald Reagan to a new seat on the United States District Court for the Southern District of Mississippi created by 98 Stat. 333. Gex was confirmed by the United States Senate on February 25, 1986, and received his commission on February 26, 1986. He assumed senior status on March 24, 2004.

== Death ==
Gex died on November 12, 2020, in Diamondhead, Mississippi.

== Sources ==
Legal offices
| Preceded by Seat established by 98 Stat. 333 | Judge of the United States District Court for the Southern District of Mississippi; 1986–2004 | Succeeded by Louis Guirola Jr. |
