= Scott G. Stewart =

American lawyer

Solicitor General of Mississippi
- Incumbent
- Assumed office 2021
- Preceded by: Kristi Haskins Johnson
- Attorney General: Lynn Fitch

Personal details
- Education: Princeton University (BA); Stanford University (JD)

Scott Grant Stewart is an American lawyer serving as the solicitor general for the state of Mississippi since 2021. He is most well known for successfully arguing the landmark Supreme Court case Dobbs v. Jackson Women's Health Organization which overturned the previously held constitutional right to abortion. Prior to that, he clerked for 9th Circuit Judge Diarmuid O'Scannlain and Justice Clarence Thomas prior to working for the Department of Justice under Donald Trump where he took aggressive anti-abortion stances.
