= Alexander v. Holmes County Board of Education =

- Supreme Court of the United States

Argued October 23, 1969 Decided October 29, 1969
- Full case name: Beatrice Alexander v. Holmes County Board of Education
- Citations: 396 U.S. 19 (more) 90 S. Ct. 29; 24 L. Ed. 2d 19

Holding
- The still segregated southern schools must desegregate immediately.

Court membership
- Chief Justice Warren E. Burger Associate Justices Hugo Black · William O. Douglas; John M. Harlan II · William J. Brennan Jr. Potter Stewart · Byron White; Thurgood Marshall

Case opinion
- Per curiam

Laws applied
- Civil Rights Act of 1964

Alexander v. Holmes County Board of Education, 396 U.S. 19 (1969), was a United States Supreme Court case in which the Court ordered immediate desegregation of public schools in the American South. It followed 15 years of delays to integrate by most Southern school boards after the Court's ruling in Brown v. Board of Education (1954) that segregated public schools were unconstitutional.

== Background ==
Justice Felix Frankfurter demanded that the opinion in 1955's Brown v. Board of Education II order desegregation with "all deliberate speed". The South took it as an excuse to emphasize "deliberate" over "speed" and conducted resistance to desegregating schools, in some jurisdictions closing public schools altogether. For 15 years, schools in the South remained segregated. In 1968, freedom of choice plans had been condemned by the Supreme Court in Green v. County School Board of New Kent County.

== Case ==
=== Holmes County ===
Beatrice Alexander, mother of children, sued the Holmes County, Mississippi School District, arguing the district made no meaningful attempt to integrate its schools, basing her opinion on the small number of Black pupils in mainly white schools.

=== Procedural history ===
Early in the summer of 1969, the federal appeals court had asked the US Department of Health, Education, and Welfare (HEW) to submit desegregation plans for thirty-three school districts in Mississippi including Holmes County School District, so HEW could order them implemented at the beginning of the school year. HEW was responsible for drawing up desegregation plans, as mandated by the 1964 Civil Rights Act, and had submitted the plans on time. At the last minute, however, both HEW and the Justice Department asked Judge William Harold Cox for extensions until December 1, claiming that the plans would result in confusion and setbacks. This was the first time the federal government had supported a desegregation delay in the federal courts. (Note: Jerris Leonard, Government lawyer, refused to pose with John C. Satterfield, a notorious segregationist, even when both pleaded on the same side.) The Fifth Circuit granted the delay, and no specific date for implementing the desegregation plans was set.

Justice Hugo Black, the supervisory justice for the Fifth Circuit Court of Appeals, and senior Associate Justice of the Supreme Court, considered this delay to be Nixon's payoff to the South, after its electoral support had helped him win the presidential election, and as part of his "Southern Strategy" of appealing to conservative whites. The NAACP Legal Defense Fund contacted Black to contest the delay in desegregation. On September 3, Black received a memo from the Justice Department – Solicitor General Griswold was urging Black to permit the Mississippi delay. Black reluctantly permitted the delay as supervisory Justice but invited the NAACP Legal Defense Fund to bring the case to the Supreme Court as soon as possible. The case was brought as Alexander v. Holmes County Board of Education.

=== Issue at question ===
The desegregation orders of Brown I and Brown II had not been followed for more than a decade, and schools in the South were desegregating slowly if at all. During lower court battles over segregation, school districts would remain segregated until all appeals were exhausted. The petitioners and others suing the Holmes County Board of Education in Mississippi for failure to desegregate, were represented by Jack Greenberg. They asked the Court to order the original HEW plans to be implemented, and proposed that the Court shift the burden of proof, making desegregation the main objective of plans.

=== Internal Court deliberations ===
New Chief Justice Warren Burger, appointed by President Nixon, did not at first think that the requested delay was unreasonable. Senior Associate Justice Hugo Black, an Alabamian himself, thought that allowing any delay was a signal to the South to further delay desegregation; he suggested a short, simple order mandating immediate integration, with no mention of debate over plans or delay. He also threatened to dissent from any opinion mentioning the word "plan," which would shatter a much-desired unanimous Court opinion. Justice William O. Douglas supported Black. Justice Harlan did not support any notion of "immediate desegregation", but he did support overturning the Fifth Circuit's delay. Justices Stewart, White, and Brennan were all initially put off by Black's demands for immediate desegregation. Justice Thurgood Marshall, the Court's only African American, suggested an implementation deadline of January, the beginning of the next school semester.

A majority of justices agreed on three elements:

1. reversing the appeals court's decisions to grant a delay in the submission of plans
2. keeping the Court of Appeals in control
3. excluding the federal district court from a role due to its years of allowing stalling.

Warren Burger, along with justices White and Harlan, drafted an early opinion with no "outside" deadline, but the court's three most liberal justices – Brennan, Marshall, and Douglas – rejected that draft, knowing it would be unacceptable to Justice Black. The basic Court breakdown was four in favor of immediate desegregation and no full Court opinion (Black, Douglas, Brennan, and Marshall), and another four wanting a more practical, less absolute opinion. Justice William J. Brennan, Jr.'s draft, made with the help of justices Douglas and Marshall, and later presented to Justice Black, ordered immediate desegregation. It later was adopted as the Court's final opinion, with some edits by Harlan and Burger.

== Opinion of the Court ==
The final opinion was a two-page per curiam that reflected the initial demands of Justice Black. The Court wrote, "The obligation of every school district is to terminate dual school systems at once and to operate now and hereafter only unitary schools." The previously set pace of "all deliberate speed" was no longer permissible.

== Subsequent developments ==
The decision was announced on October 29.

=== Political reactions ===
Republican senator Strom Thurmond of South Carolina decried the decision, while praising President Richard Nixon for having "stood with the South in this case" while former Alabama governor George Wallace said the new Burger court was "no better than the Warren Court," and called the justices "limousine hypocrites." Sam Ervin filed an amendment to the Civil Rights Act of 1964, which failed, stating freedom of choice was the standard for integration. The decision came as a surprise to the Nixon administration, which had previously referred to those calling for immediate integration as an "extreme group."

In Mississippi, Governor John Bell Williams promised the establishment of a private school system, but advised against violence. This position was pushed by Jimmy Swan while William K. Scarborough advocated nullification. Demonstrations against this decision were held. To the opposite of this, a group of Protestant, Catholic and Jewish clerics backed integration. In order to smooth the transition, Federal agents were sent. Ted Kennedy expressed satisfaction to the ruling while Hugh Scott wanted to raise the funding of the HEW to give them the resources needed to implement Alexander. Some districts tried to set up single-sex education in their schools.

=== Effects in Holmes County ===
The Supreme Court's effort to integrate the Holmes County School District was unsuccessful. In 1968 there were 771 white students in the county school system. Desegregation occurred in 1969, and that year the white student population decreased to 228. In 1970 no white students were enrolled. Over 99% of students attending public schools in Holmes County are Black. White students attended East Holmes Academy and Central Holmes Christian School, privately controlled segregation academies.

== Citations ==
=== Bibliography ===
- Doherty, Patric J. (1970). "Integration Now: A Study of Alexander v. Holmes County Board of Education". Notre Dame Law Review. 45 (3): 489–514. ISSN 0745-3515.
- Woodward, Bob; Armstrong, Scott (1979). The Brethren. Simon & Schuster. ISBN 0-671-24110-9.
