= Louis Guirola Jr. =

American judge (born 1951)

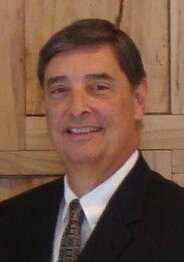
- Guirola in 2018

Judge of the United States Foreign Intelligence Surveillance Court
- In office July 2, 2019 – May 19, 2026
- Appointed by: John Roberts
- Preceded by: Raymond Dearie
- Succeeded by: James E. Kinkeade

Senior Judge of the United States District Court for the Southern District of Mississippi
- Incumbent
- Assumed office March 23, 2018

Chief Judge of the United States District Court for the Southern District of Mississippi
- In office 2010–2017
- Preceded by: Henry Travillion Wingate
- Succeeded by: Daniel P. Jordan III

Judge of the United States District Court for the Southern District of Mississippi
- In office March 22, 2004 – March 23, 2018
- Appointed by: George W. Bush
- Preceded by: Walter J. Gex III
- Succeeded by: Taylor B. McNeel

Magistrate Judge of the United States District Court for the Southern District of Mississippi
- In office 1996–2004

Magistrate Judge of the United States District Court for the Western District of Texas
- In office 1993–1996

Personal details
- Born: 1951 (age 74–75) Baltimore, Maryland, U.S.
- Education: William Carey College (BA); University of Mississippi (JD)

Louis Guirola Jr. (born 1951) is a senior United States district judge of the United States District Court for the Southern District of Mississippi and a judge on the United States Foreign Intelligence Surveillance Court and the United States Alien Terrorist Removal Court.

== Education and career ==
Born in Baltimore, Guirola received a Bachelor of Arts degree from William Carey College in 1973. He subsequently received a Juris Doctor from the University of Mississippi Law School in 1979. He was in private practice in Mississippi from 1979 to 1980 and again from 1986 to 1990. He was an assistant district attorney of 19th Judicial District, Mississippi from 1980 to 1984, and a county board attorney of Jackson County, Mississippi from 1984 to 1986. He was an Assistant United States Attorney of the Eastern District of Texas from 1990 to 1993.

=== Federal judicial service ===
Guirola was a United States magistrate judge of the United States District Court for the Western District of Texas from 1993 to 1996, and of the United States District Court for the Southern District of Mississippi from 1996 to 2004. On September 23, 2003, Guirola was nominated by President George W. Bush to a seat on the Southern District of Mississippi vacated by Judge Walter J. Gex III. Guirola was confirmed by the United States Senate on March 12, 2004, and received his commission on March 22, 2004. He served as chief judge from 2010 to 2017. In 2016, he approved a US$150 million settlement rescuing the Singing River Health System pension fund.

He assumed senior status on March 23, 2018. As a senior judge, he issued a nationwide injunction blocking the Department of Health and Human Services’ transgender-care rule on July 3, 2024, and upheld Mississippi’s five-day absentee-ballot counting window in July 2024.

=== Foreign Intelligence Surveillance Court ===
On May 15, 2019, Chief Justice John Roberts appointed Guirola to the Foreign Intelligence Surveillance Court for a term beginning July 2, 2019.

=== Alien Terrorist Removal Court ===
In 2021, he was appointed to a 5-year term on the United States Alien Terrorist Removal Court.

== See also ==
- List of Hispanic and Latino American jurists

Legal offices
Preceded by Walter J. Gex III	Judge of the United States District Court for the Southern District of Mississippi; 2004–2018	Succeeded by Taylor B. McNeel
Preceded by Henry Travillion Wingate	Chief Judge of the United States District Court for the Southern District of Mississippi; 2010–2017	Succeeded by Daniel P. Jordan III
Preceded by Raymond Dearie	Judge of the United States Foreign Intelligence Surveillance Court; 2019–2026	Succeeded by James E. Kinkeade
