= Kristi Haskins Johnson =

American judge (born 1980)

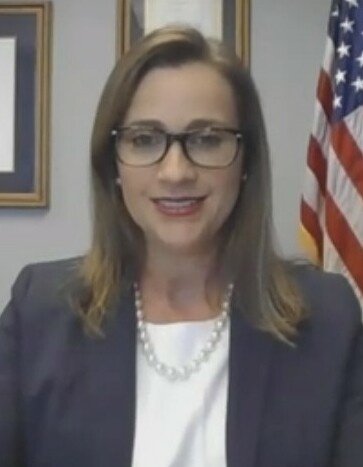

Judge of the United States District Court for the Southern District of Mississippi
- Incumbent
- Assumed office December 1, 2020
- Appointed by: Donald Trump
- Preceded by: Keith Starrett

Solicitor General of Mississippi
- In office February 24, 2020 – December 1, 2020
- Attorney General: Lynn Fitch
- Preceded by: Position established
- Succeeded by: Scott G. Stewart

Personal details
- Born: Kristi Erin Haskins; 1980 (age 45–46) Oxford, Mississippi, U.S.
- Education: University of Mississippi (BA); Mississippi College; School of Law (JD)

Kristi Erin Haskins Johnson (née Haskins; born 1980) is a United States district judge of the United States District Court for the Southern District of Mississippi and former solicitor general of Mississippi.

== Education ==
Johnson earned her Bachelor of Arts from the University of Mississippi in 2003 and her Juris Doctor, summa cum laude, from the Mississippi College School of Law in 2008, where she served as an editor of the Mississippi College Law Review.

== Career ==
Upon graduation from law school, Johnson served as a law clerk to Judge Sharion Aycock of the United States District Court for the Northern District of Mississippi and to Judge Leslie Southwick of the United States Court of Appeals for the Fifth Circuit. She worked in private practice at Ogletree, Deakins, Nash, Smoak & Stewart and later served as an Assistant United States Attorney for the Southern District of Mississippi. On February 24, 2020, Mississippi Attorney General Lynn Fitch appointed Johnson the first Solicitor General of Mississippi. She left her position as Solicitor General upon being appointed a federal judge. Haskins has served as an adjunct professor at Mississippi College.

=== Federal judicial service ===
On March 30, 2020, President Donald Trump announced his intent to nominate Johnson to serve as a United States district judge of the United States District Court for the Southern District of Mississippi. On May 4, 2020, her nomination was sent to the Senate. President Trump nominated Johnson to the seat vacated by Judge Keith Starrett, who assumed senior status on April 30, 2019. On September 9, 2020, a hearing on her nomination was held before the Senate Judiciary Committee. On October 22, 2020, her nomination was reported out of committee by a 12–0 vote. On November 16, 2020, the United States Senate invoked cloture on her nomination by a 51–38 vote. On November 17, 2020, her nomination was confirmed by a 53–43 vote. She received her judicial commission on December 1, 2020. Haskins is the first woman to serve as a federal judge in the Southern District of Mississippi.

== Memberships ==
Johnson is a member of the Federalist Society, the Federal Bar Association, and the Charles L. Clark Chapter of the American Inns of Court.

Legal offices
| New office | Solicitor General of Mississippi; 2020 | Succeeded by Scott G. Stewart |
| Preceded by Keith Starrett | Judge of the United States District Court for the Southern District of Mississippi; 2020–present | Incumbent |
