= William A. Hill =

American judge (1864–1932)

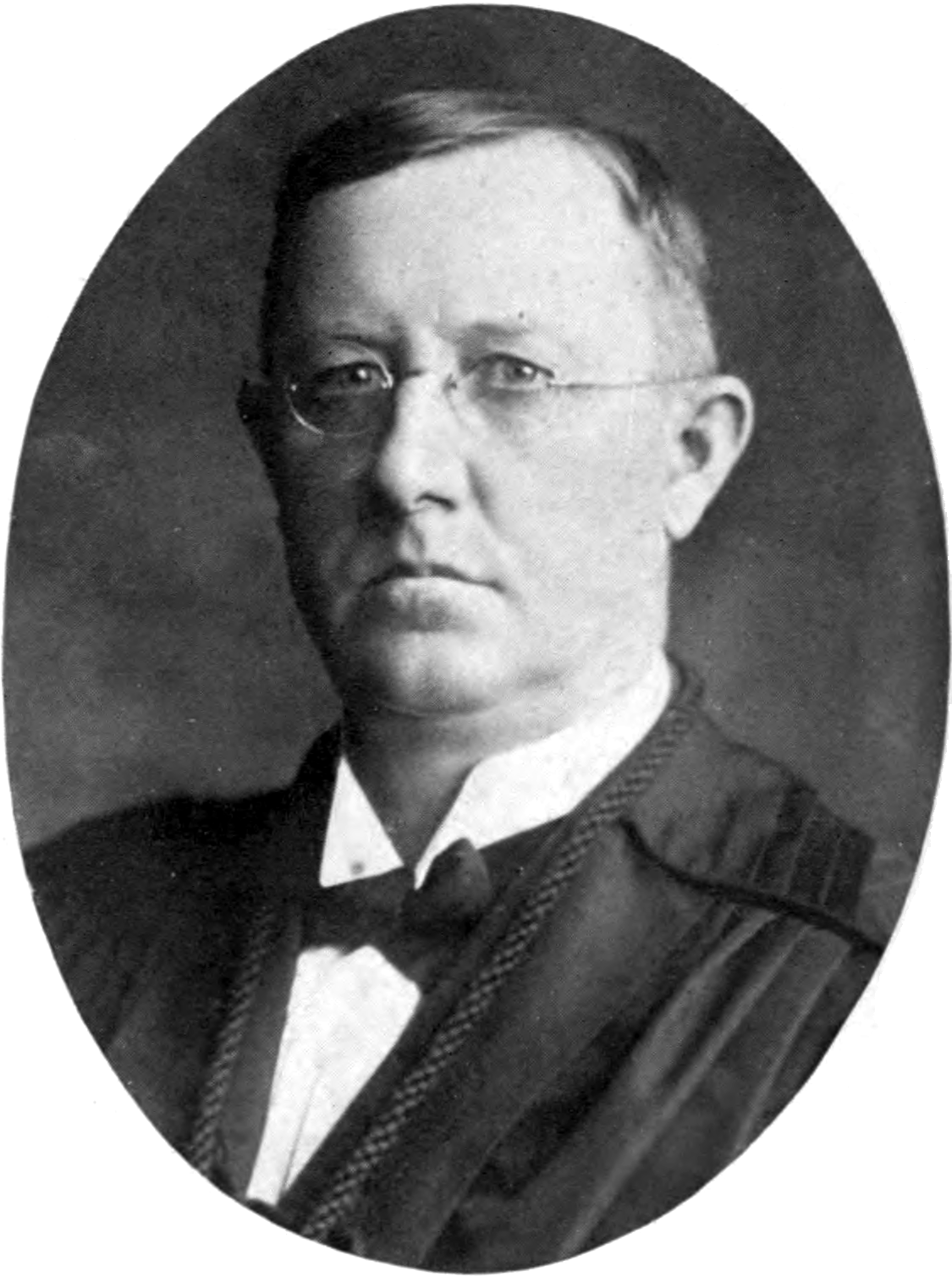
- William Hill as depicted in 1917.

Chief justice of the Colorado Supreme Court
- In office 1918–1919

Justice of the Colorado Supreme Court
- In office 1909–1919

Personal details
- Born: 1864 Farmington, Illinois
- Died: March 10, 1932 (aged 67–68) Los Angeles County, California
- Party: Democratic Party
- Occupation: Justice and chief justice of the supreme court

William A. Hill (1864 – March 10, 1932) was an associate justice of the Colorado Supreme Court from 1909 to 1918. He served as chief justice from 1918 to 1919.

== Early life and education ==
He was born in Farmington, Illinois, his birth date variously reported as being on November 4 or December 19, 1864. His parents were Amanda (Martin) and Abner K. Hill, a hotelier in Fort Morgan, Colorado. He attended public schools as a child, receiving his high school and college education in Illinois and Iowa. He first worked in the railroad business as a station agent and a telegraph operator. He gained his knowledge of the law through self-study and by practicing the law.

== Career ==
After moving to Colorado, he was admitted to the bar in 1888 or 1890. A member of the Democratic Party, he held various appointed and elected positions, including serving as county attorney of Morgan County, Colorado for six years. He was elected mayor of Fort Morgan, Colorado and held this office in 1892 and 1893. He was then the county attorney of Morgan County, Colorado from 1893 to 1898. In addition, Hill served in the State Senate, representing the 12th and 25th districts for eight years. An attorney, he specialized in irrigation law.

Hill was appointed to the Colorado Supreme Court for a ten-year period in 1909. He served as chief justice for the final two years of his appointment, from 1918 to 1919. Hill also invested in real estate within Morgan County, including Fort Morgan.

== Personal life ==
He married Elizabeth "Lizzie" Hunter in May 1890 at Banner, Illinois or on June 26, 1890 at York, Nebraska. Born in Augusta, Illinois, she was the daughter of John H. Hunter. Lizzie and William Hill had a daughter, Zana A. Hill. Zana attended the University of Denver and the New England Conservatory of Music. Among her travels, she was in China in 1916 and 1917 during the rise of the monarchy and war there in 1917.

Hill was a member of the Masonic Temple and Knights of Pythias. Hill and his wife moved to California in July 1931. He died of a heart attack in Santa Monica, California on March 10, 1932 and is buried at Forest Lawn Memorial Park in Glendale.

Political offices
Preceded by	Chief Justice of the Colorado Supreme Court; 1918–1919	Succeeded by
