= United States Courthouse and Post Office (Aberdeen, Mississippi) =

- U.S. Courthouse and Post Office
- U.S. National Register of Historic Places
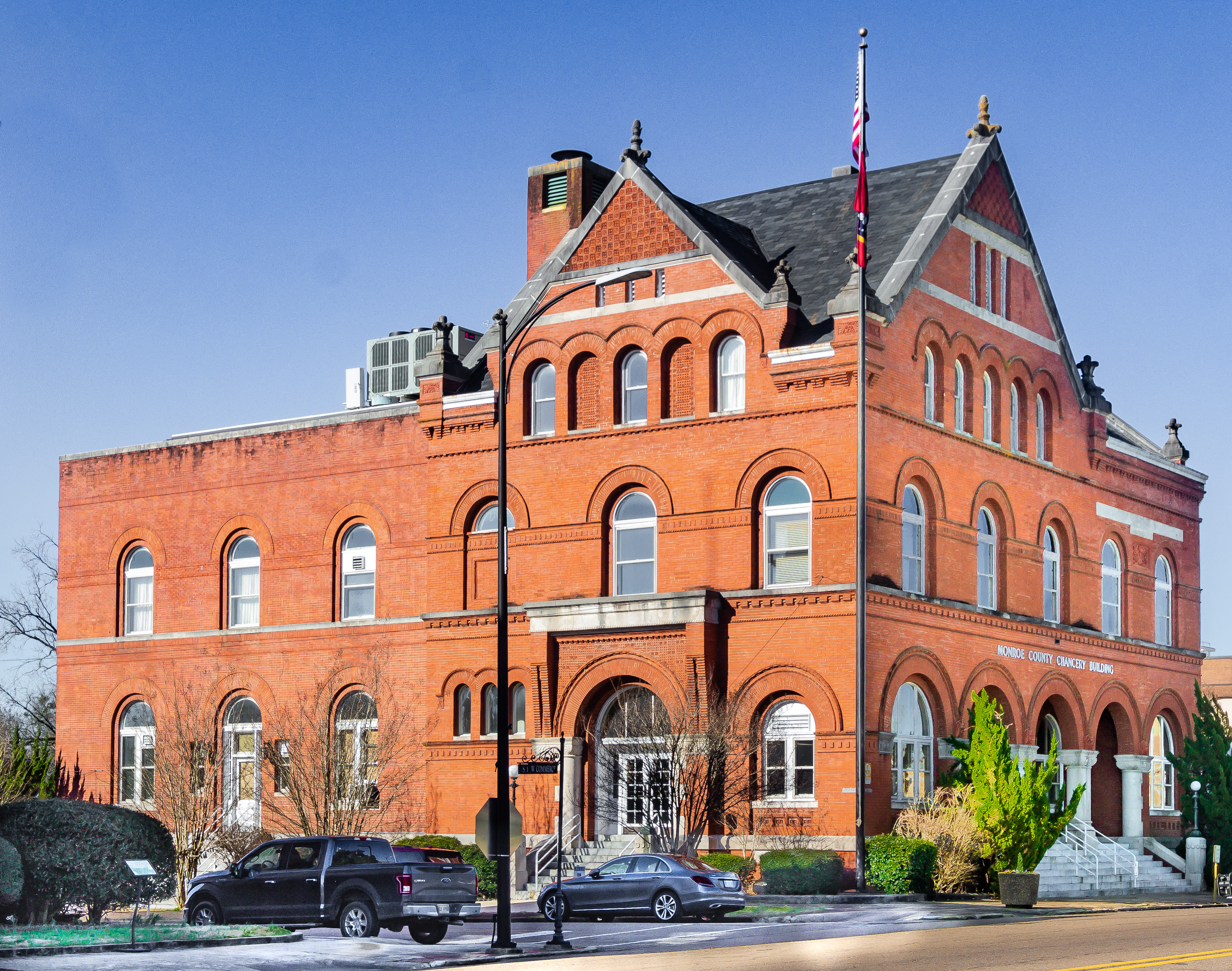

- Location within Mississippi Location within the United States
- Location: 201 W. Commerce St., Aberdeen, Mississippi
- Coordinates: 33°49′29″N 88°32′41″W
- Area: less than one acre
- Built: 1885
- Architect: Mifflin E. Bell and William A. Freret
- Architectural style: Victorian Romanesque
- NRHP reference No.: 76001104
- Added to NRHP: September 29, 1976

The U.S. Courthouse and Post Office in Aberdeen, Mississippi was built in 1885. Also known as Old Federal Building, it served historically as a courthouse and as a post office. It was listed on the National Register of Historic Places in 1976.

It is a red brick and gray stone 2-1/2-story building in the "Victorian Romanesque style embellished with Gothic and Classical details." It has terra cotta decorations.

William A. Freret replaced Mifflin E. Bell as architect during the project.
