= Heritage Academy (Mississippi) =

Private school founded as a segregation academy

Coordinates: 33°31′19″N 88°25′28″W

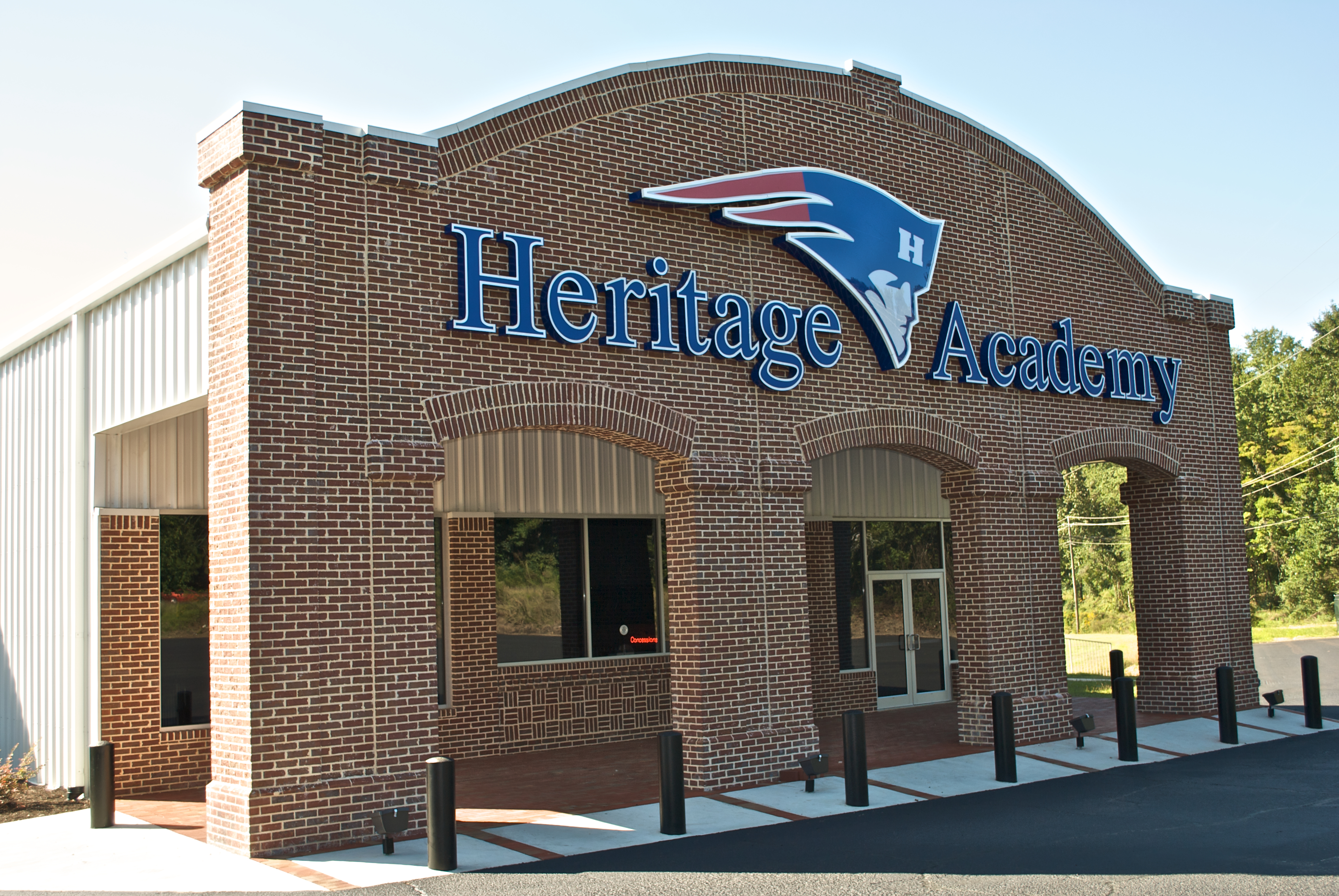

Location
- 625 Magnolia Lane; Columbus, Mississippi 39705; United States

Information
- Type: Private
- Patron saint: Columbus Educational Foundation
- Established: 1964
- Principal: Karen Pittman, Secondary
- Principal: Vonda Winter, Elementary
- Headmaster: Sean Harrison
- Staff: 72
- Faculty: 48
- Grades: K4-12
- Enrollment: 472
- Colors: Red and Blue
- Mascot: Patriots
- Accreditation: Southern Association of Colleges and Schools; Mississippi Association of Independent Schools; Southern Association of Independent Schools
- Newspaper: The Banner
- Yearbook: The Heritor
- Tuition: $7,000 - $8,000
- Website: http://www.heritagepatriots.com/

Heritage Academy is a private school in Columbus, Mississippi. It was founded in 1964 as a segregation academy.

== History ==
Heritage was founded in 1964 as a segregation academy. In 1988, Heritage enrolled its first Black students, Jabari and Jasáda Dunbar.

=== 1989 football forfeitures ===
In 1989, Heritage Academy became the first school in the Mississippi Association of Independent Schools (MAIS) North Conference to have a black player on its football team. The school received national media attention when two other schools threatened to forfeit games rather than play against a racially integrated opponent. The opponents, two former segregation academies named Sharkey-Issaquena Academy and the East Holmes Academy, claimed that injuries, not race, were the reason for forfeiting the games. Heritage Academy headmaster and head coach Ray Wooten rejected the denials, calling them "a bunch of bull."

After seven players and two school board members resigned, East Holmes Academy reconsidered its decision to forfeit. The black player, sophomore running back Scott Fuller, offered to quit the Heritage Academy team so the game could be played, but coach Ray Wooten insisted that Fuller remain on the team.

In 1991, the student body elected Jabari O. Dunbar the first, and to date (as of 2019) only, African-American president of Heritage Academy's Student Government Association. The following year, Jabari graduated with honors, the school's first African-American graduate. His sister Jasa'da Dunbar became the second in 1998.

== Athletics and extracurricular activities ==
Heritage Academy's first athletic director was Billy Brewer. When Brewer later accepted a coaching position at Ole Miss, he told the Clarion-Ledger that his involvement with the all-white academy was his "own business" and that it would not affect Ole Miss's efforts to recruit black players.

The Heritage Academy football team won the MPSA AAA championship in 1986 and the MAIS championship in 2012 and 2019.

The Heritage Academy basketball team won MPSA titles in 1992 (2A), 2018 (3A), and 2019(3A). The 2019 basketball team also went on to win the MAIS Overall Championship that year.

Heritage Academy golf won the MAIS 3A Championship in 2012, 2016, and 2017.

In addition to these sports, Heritage Academy also offers baseball, soccer, softball, volleyball, tennis, track and field, cross country, rugby, pickleball, wrestling, and badminton.

Non-athletic extracurricular opportunities include cheerleading, competitive dance, robotics, quiz bowl, various school clubs, and the spirit store.
