= Elton Joe Kendall =

American judge (born 1954)

Judge of the United States District Court for the Northern District of Texas
- In office May 15, 1992 – January 22, 2002
- Appointed by: George H. W. Bush
- Preceded by: Seat established by 104 Stat. 5089
- Succeeded by: James E. Kinkeade

Personal details
- Born: Elton Joe Kendall; 1954 (age 71–72) Dallas, Texas
- Education: Southern Methodist University (BBA); Baylor University School of Law (JD)

Elton Joe Kendall (born 1954) is a former United States district judge of the United States District Court for the Northern District of Texas.

== Education and career ==
Born in Dallas, Texas, Kendall was a police officer in the Dallas Police Department from 1972 to 1978. He received a Bachelor of Business Administration from Southern Methodist University in 1977 and a Juris Doctor from Baylor University School of Law in 1980. He was an assistant district attorney of Dallas County, Texas from 1980 to 1982, thereafter entering private practice in Dallas until 1986.

== Judicial career ==
Kendall was a judge on the 195th Texas State District Court from 1987 to 1992.

On March 20, 1992, Kendall was nominated by President George H. W. Bush to a new seat on the United States District Court for the Northern District of Texas created by 104 Stat. 5089. He was confirmed by the United States Senate on May 12, 1992, and received his commission on May 15, 1992. In 1999, he was also appointed by President Bill Clinton to be a Commissioner of the United States Sentencing Commission. Kendall resigned from the bench, on January 22, 2002, and from the U.S. Sentencing Commission in 2003.

== Other service ==
During Kendall's public service, he was editor of In Camera, the national newsletter of the Federal Judges Association, where he was also a member of the Board of Directors. As a member of the U.S. Sentencing Commission, Kendall worked on many important sentencing issues including guidelines dealing with white collar fraud cases, penalties in drug and immigration cases, internet fraud and pornography guidelines, as well as corporate governance and compliance issues under the Sarbanes-Oxley Act of 2002.

Kendall taught in numerous programs presented by the Federal Judicial Center (the entity that teaches federal judges) in Washington, D.C. beginning in the mid-1990s. He has taught the Federal Sentencing Guidelines to new federal judges at Federal Judicial Center orientation programs and docket management to experienced federal judges from around the country. Kendall has also taught conference workshops for the federal judges of Texas, Louisiana and Mississippi, federal trial and appellate prosecutors from throughout the country at their training center in South Carolina, lawyers of the Federal Bar Association and United States Probation Officers nationwide. Kendall has also been a faculty member of the Texas Center for the Judiciary, the educational entity that teaches Texas State Judges.

== Post-judicial career ==
Following his resignation from the bench, Kendall managed the Dallas office of Provost Umphrey. The law firm gained national recognition for its lead against tobacco companies for the State of Texas, producing a $17.3 billion settlement. As of 2017, Kendall is managing partner of Kendall Law Group, LLP. His practice focuses on complex civil and criminal litigation.

== Sources ==
Legal offices
Preceded by Seat established by 140 Stat. 5089	Judge of the United States District Court for the Northern District of Texas; 1992–2002	Succeeded by James E. Kinkeade
