= Tom Stewart Lee =

American judge (born 1941)

Senior Judge of the United States District Court for the Southern District of Mississippi
- Incumbent
- Assumed office April 8, 2006

Chief Judge of the United States District Court for the Southern District of Mississippi
- In office 1996–2003
- Preceded by: William H. Barbour Jr.
- Succeeded by: Henry Travillion Wingate

Judge of the United States District Court for the Southern District of Mississippi
- In office June 11, 1984 – April 8, 2006
- Appointed by: Ronald Reagan
- Preceded by: Dan Monroe Russell Jr.
- Succeeded by: Daniel P. Jordan III

Personal details
- Born: Tom Stewart Lee; April 8, 1941 (age 85) Jackson, Mississippi, U.S.
- Education: Mississippi College (BA); University of Mississippi (JD)

Tom Stewart Lee (born April 8, 1941) is a senior United States district judge of the United States District Court for the Southern District of Mississippi.

== Education and career ==
Lee was born in Jackson, Michigan. He received a Bachelor of Arts degree from Mississippi College in 1963 and a Juris Doctor from the University of Mississippi Law School in 1965. He was in the United States Army Reserve Captain, JAG Corps from 1965 to 1973. He was in private practice in Forest, Mississippi from 1965 to 1984. He was a prosecuting attorney of Scott County, Mississippi from 1968 to 1971. He was a judge of the Scott County Youth Court in Forest, Mississippi from 1979 to 1982. He was a municipal judge for the city of Forest, Mississippi in 1982.

=== Federal judicial service ===
Lee was nominated by President Ronald Reagan on May 15, 1984, to a seat on the United States District Court for the Southern District of Mississippi vacated by Judge Dan Monroe Russell Jr. He was confirmed by the United States Senate on June 11, 1984, and received his commission the same day. He served as chief judge from 1996 to 2003. He assumed senior status on April 8, 2006.

== Sources ==
Legal offices
Preceded by Dan Monroe Russell Jr.	Judge of the United States District Court for the Southern District of Mississippi; 1984–2006	Succeeded by Daniel P. Jordan III
Preceded by William H. Barbour Jr.	Chief Judge of the United States District Court for the Southern District of Mississippi; 1996–2003	Succeeded by Henry Travillion Wingate
