= Robert Andrews Hill =

American judge

Judge of the United States District Court for the Northern District of Mississippi Judge of the United States District Court for the Southern District of Mississippi
- In office May 1, 1866 – August 1, 1891
- Appointed by: Andrew Johnson
- Preceded by: Samuel J. Gholson
- Succeeded by: Henry Clay Niles

Personal details
- Born: Robert Andrews Hill; March 25, 1811 Iredell County, North Carolina, U.S.
- Died: July 2, 1900 (aged 89) Oxford, Mississippi, U.S.
- Education: read law

Robert Andrews Hill (March 25, 1811 – July 2, 1900) was a United States district judge of the United States District Court for the Northern District of Mississippi and the United States District Court for the Southern District of Mississippi.

== Early life ==
Born in Iredell County, North Carolina, Hill was the son of David Hill and Rhoda Andrews, and the grandson of Scottish-Irish forebears who had emigrated to Pennsylvania in the 18th century and later settled in North Carolina. Hill read law to enter the bar in 1844.

== Career ==
He was a constable in Williamson County, Tennessee, from 1834 to 1836, and was then a Justice of Peace for the county until 1844. He was in private practice in Waynesboro, Tennessee from 1844 to 1847. He was a state district attorney general of Waynesboro from 1847 to 1855, thereafter resuming private practice in Jacinto, Mississippi, until 1858. He was a Judge of the Probate Court of Tishomingo County, Mississippi from 1858 to 1865, and was a district chancellor for the state of Mississippi from 1865 to 1866.

== Federal judicial service ==
Hill was nominated by President Andrew Johnson on March 27, 1866, to a joint seat on the United States District Court for the Northern District of Mississippi and the United States District Court for the Southern District of Mississippi vacated by Judge Samuel J. Gholson. He was confirmed by the United States Senate on May 1, 1866, and received his commission the same day. His service terminated on August 1, 1891, due to his retirement.

== Death ==
Hill died on July 2, 1900, in Oxford, Mississippi.

== Sources ==
Legal offices
Preceded by Samuel J. Gholson	Judge of the United States District Court for the Northern District of Mississippi; Judge of the United States District Court for the Southern District of Mississippi; 1866–1891	Succeeded by Henry Clay Niles
