= Dan Monroe Russell Jr. =

American judge

Dan Russell

Senior Judge of the United States District Court for the Southern District of Mississippi
- In office October 25, 1983 – April 16, 2011

Chief Judge of the United States District Court for the Southern District of Mississippi
- In office 1971–1982
- Preceded by: William Harold Cox
- Succeeded by: Walter Nixon

Judge of the United States District Court for the Southern District of Mississippi
- In office October 2, 1965 – October 25, 1983
- Appointed by: Lyndon B. Johnson
- Preceded by: Sidney Carr Mize
- Succeeded by: Tom Stewart Lee

Personal details
- Born: Dan Monroe Russell Jr. March 15, 1913 Magee, Mississippi, U.S.
- Died: April 16, 2011 (aged 98) Gulfport, Mississippi, U.S.
- Education: University of Mississippi (B.A.); University of Mississippi School of Law (LL.B.)

Dan Monroe Russell Jr. (March 15, 1913 – April 16, 2011) was a United States district judge of the United States District Court for the Southern District of Mississippi.

== Education and career ==
Born on March 15, 1913, in Magee, Mississippi, Russell received a Bachelor of Arts degree from the University of Mississippi in 1935, and a Bachelor of Laws from the University of Mississippi School of Law in 1937. He was a claims adjuster in Jackson, Mississippi from 1937 to 1938. He was in private practice in Bay St. Louis, Mississippi from 1938 to 1941, and was a Lieutenant Commander in the Office of Naval Intelligence during World War II, from 1941 to 1945. He returned to private practice in Bay St. Louis from 1945 to 1965.

== Federal judicial service ==
On September 24, 1965, Russell was nominated by President Lyndon B. Johnson to a seat on the United States District Court for the Southern District of Mississippi vacated by Judge Sidney Carr Mize. Russell was confirmed by the United States Senate on October 1, 1965, and received his commission the following day. He served as Chief Judge from 1971 to 1982, assuming senior status on October 25, 1983. His service terminated on April 16, 2011, due to his death in Gulfport, Mississippi.

== See also ==
- List of United States federal judges by longevity of service

== Sources ==
Legal offices
Preceded by Sidney Carr Mize	Judge of the United States District Court for the Southern District of Mississippi; 1965–1983	Succeeded by Tom Stewart Lee
Preceded by William Harold Cox	Chief Judge of the United States District Court for the Southern District of Mississippi; 1971–1982	Succeeded by Walter Nixon
