= Daniel P. Jordan III =

American judge (born 1964)

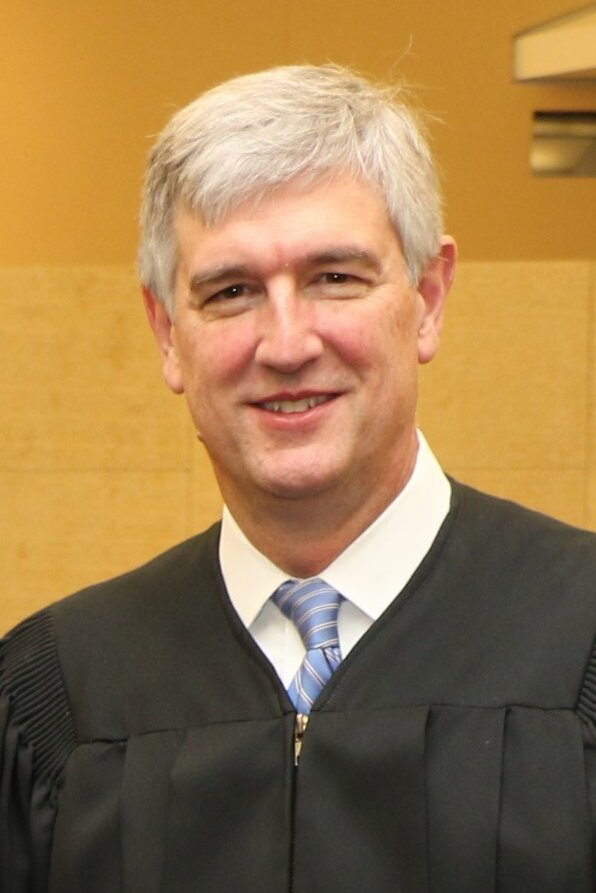
- Jordan in 2021

Chief Judge of the United States District Court for the Southern District of Mississippi
- In office November 4, 2017 – November 4, 2024
- Preceded by: Louis Guirola Jr.
- Succeeded by: Halil Suleyman Ozerden

Judge of the United States District Court for the Southern District of Mississippi
- Incumbent
- Assumed office August 7, 2006
- Appointed by: George W. Bush
- Preceded by: Tom Stewart Lee

Personal details
- Born: Daniel Porter Jordan III; November 20, 1964 (age 61) Fort Bragg, North Carolina, U.S.
- Parent: Daniel P. Jordan (father)
- Education: University of Mississippi (BBA); University of Virginia (JD)

Daniel Porter Jordan III (born November 20, 1964) is a United States district judge of the United States District Court for the Southern District of Mississippi.

== Education and career ==
Jordan was born in Fort Bragg, North Carolina. He received a Bachelor of Business Administration degree from the University of Mississippi in 1987 and a Juris Doctor from the University of Virginia Law School in 1993. He was in private practice in Jackson, Mississippi, from 1993 to 2006.

=== Federal judicial service ===
On April 24, 2006, Jordan was nominated by President George W. Bush to a seat on the United States District Court for the Southern District of Mississippi vacated by Judge Tom Stewart Lee. Jordan was confirmed by the United States Senate on July 20, 2006, and received his commission on August 7, 2006. He became chief judge on November 4, 2017.

Legal offices
Preceded by Tom Stewart Lee	Judge of the United States District Court for the Southern District of Mississippi; 2006–present	Incumbent
Preceded by Louis Guirola Jr.	Chief Judge of the United States District Court for the Southern District of Mississippi; 2017–2024	Succeeded by Halil Suleyman Ozerden
