= Daniel P. Jordan (historian) =

American historian (1938–2024)

- Born: Daniel Porter Jordan Jr. July 22, 1938; Philadelphia, Mississippi, U.S.
- Died: March 21, 2024 (aged 85)
- Education: University of Mississippi; University of Virginia
- Occupation: Historian
- Children: 3; including Daniel P. Jordan III

Daniel Porter Jordan Jr. (July 22, 1938 – March 21, 2024) was an American historian.

== Life and career ==
Jordan was born in Philadelphia, Mississippi. He attended the University of Mississippi, earning a bachelor's degree in 1960 and a master's degree in history in 1962. He also attended the University of Virginia, studying under Merrill D. Peterson and earning his PhD degree in 1970.

Jordan was a history professor at Virginia Commonwealth University.

Jordan was president of the Thomas Jefferson Foundation from 1985 to 2008.

Jordan died on March 21, 2024, at the age of 85.
