= William Harold Cox =

American judge (1901–1988)

Senior Judge of the United States District Court for the Southern District of Mississippi
- In office October 4, 1982 – February 25, 1988

Chief Judge of the United States District Court for the Southern District of Mississippi
- In office 1962–1971
- Preceded by: Sidney Carr Mize
- Succeeded by: Dan Monroe Russell Jr.

Judge of the United States District Court for the Southern District of Mississippi
- In office June 30, 1961 – October 4, 1982
- Appointed by: John F. Kennedy
- Preceded by: Seat established by 75 Stat. 80
- Succeeded by: William H. Barbour Jr.

Personal details
- Born: William Harold Cox; June 23, 1901 Indianola, Mississippi, U.S.
- Died: February 25, 1988 (aged 86) Jackson, Mississippi, U.S.
- Education: University of Mississippi (BS, LLB)

William Harold Cox (June 23, 1901 – February 25, 1988) was an American attorney, jurist and white supremacist who served as a United States district judge of the United States District Court for the Southern District of Mississippi. He was known for presiding over United States v. Price (1965) and for his resistance to racial integration. Constance Baker Motley, a longtime civil rights attorney for the NAACP Legal Defense and Educational Fund and the first Black woman to serve as a federal judge, called Cox "the most openly racist judge ever to sit on a federal court bench" in the United States.

== Early life and education ==
Born in Indianola, Mississippi, Cox received a Bachelor of Science degree from University of Mississippi and a Bachelor of Laws from University of Mississippi School of Law in 1924. While in college, he was roommates with future Senator James Eastland.

== Career ==
Cox was in private practice of law in Jackson, Mississippi from 1924 to 1961.

=== Federal judicial service ===
Cox was nominated by President John F. Kennedy on June 20, 1961, to the United States District Court for the Southern District of Mississippi, to a new seat created by 75 Stat. 80. He was confirmed by the United States Senate on June 27, 1961, and received his commission on June 30, 1961. He was nominated as part of a deal between Mississippi Senator James Eastland and President John F. Kennedy, who sought to nominate Thurgood Marshall to a circuit court position, with Eastland saying he'd allow Marshall's appointment if Cox was also appointed.

Cox's remark of "I don't know who is telling these Negroes they can push people around just by getting into a line and acting like a bunch of chimpanzees," at a hearing on voter discrimination led to calls for his impeachment from New York Senator Jacob Javits and New Jersey Representative Peter Rodino. Their efforts to impeach Cox saw support from twenty other congressmen but failed, and no impeachment proceedings were held. Cox served as Chief Judge from 1962 to 1971, assumed senior status on October 4, 1982, and his service was terminated on February 25, 1988, due to his death in Jackson.

== Notable cases ==
Cox was known as a segregationist and referred to blacks as "baboons" from the bench. When the United States Justice Department sued to block Mississippi's prosecution of John Hardy, a black resident who was beaten after he attempted to register to vote, Judge Cox denied the Department's motion for a temporary restraining order. The Fifth Circuit Court of Appeals reversed Judge Cox's decision, and the Supreme Court denied review of the appellate decision.

Cox's most famous case was United States v. Price (1965), the federal government's effort to prosecute suspected individuals involved in the murders of Chaney, Goodman, and Schwerner. Cox initially dismissed the indictments on all but two of those charged on the grounds that they were not government officials and therefore could not be charged with acting "under color of law." On appeal, Cox's action was reversed by the United States Supreme Court in 1966; Cox then presided over a trial that convicted some of those charged. He issued three to ten year sentences for the convictions of first- and second-degree murder. Cox said of his sentences, "They killed one nigger, one Jew, and a white man. I gave them all what I thought they deserved." Goodman and Schwerner were both Jewish.

Cox also ruled against the use of symbolic speech by high school students promoting civil rights in Blackwell v. Issaquena Board of Education.

== Bibliography ==
- Branch, Taylor (1988). Parting the Waters: America in the King Years, 1954-63. New York: Simon and Schuster. ISBN 0-671-46097-8.
- Motley, Constance Baker (1998). Equal Justice Under Law. New York: Farrar, Straus and Giroux. ISBN 0-374-52618-4.

Legal offices
Preceded by Seat established by 75 Stat. 80	Judge of the United States District Court for the Southern District of Mississippi; 1961–1982	Succeeded by William H. Barbour Jr.
Preceded by Sidney Carr Mize	Chief Judge of the United States District Court for the Southern District of Mississippi; 1962–1971	Succeeded by Dan Monroe Russell Jr.
