= United States District Court for the Southern District of Mississippi =

United States federal district court in Mississippi

Coordinates: 32.294765°N 90.183771°W

- (S.D. Miss.)
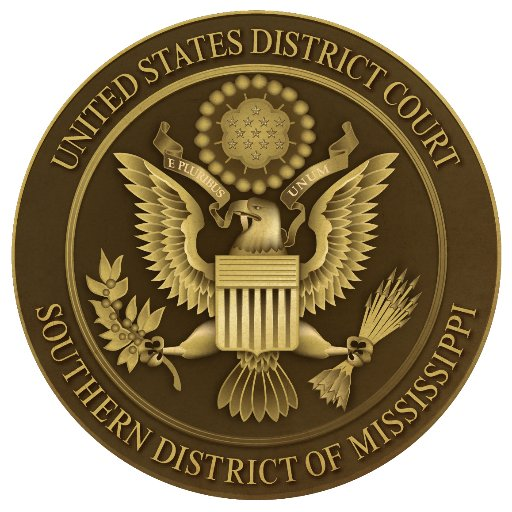
- Location: Jackson More locations: Hattiesburg; Gulfport; United States Courthouse (Natchez)
- Appeals to: Fifth Circuit
- Established: June 18, 1838
- Judges: 6
- Chief Judge: Halil Suleyman Ozerden

Officers of the court
- U.S. Attorney: Baxter Kruger
- U.S. Marshal: Mark B. Shepherd
- www.mssd.uscourts.gov

The United States District Court for the Southern District of Mississippi (in case citations, S.D. Miss.) is a federal court in the Fifth Circuit with facilities in Gulfport, Hattiesburg, Natchez, and Jackson.

Appeals from cases brought in the Southern District of Mississippi are taken to the United States Court of Appeals for the Fifth Circuit (except for patent claims and claims against the U.S. government under the Tucker Act, which are appealed to the Federal Circuit).

The United States attorney for the Southern District of Mississippi represents the United States in civil and criminal litigation in the court. The United States attorney is Baxter Kruger.

== Counties under jurisdiction ==
- Adams
- Amite
- Claiborne
- Clarke
- Copiah
- Covington
- Forrest
- Franklin
- George
- Greene
- Hancock
- Harrison
- Hinds
- Holmes
- Issaquena
- Jackson
- Jasper
- Jefferson
- Jefferson Davis
- Jones
- Kemper
- Lamar
- Lauderdale
- Lawrence
- Leake
- Lincoln
- Madison
- Marion
- Neshoba
- Newton
- Noxubee
- Pearl River
- Perry
- Pike
- Rankin
- Scott
- Sharkey
- Simpson
- Smith
- Stone
- Walthall
- Warren
- Wayne
- Wilkinson
- Yazoo

== Current judges ==
As of November 4, 2024:

| # | Title | Judge | Duty station | Born | Term of service | | | Appointed by |
| # | Title | Judge | Duty station | Born | Active | Chief | Senior | Appointed by |
|---|---|---|---|---|---|---|---|---|
| 19 | Chief Judge | Halil Suleyman Ozerden | Gulfport | 1966 | 2007–present | 2024–present | — | G.W. Bush |
| 12 | District Judge | Henry Travillion Wingate | Jackson | 1947 | 1985–present | 2003–2010 | — | Reagan |
| 18 | District Judge | Daniel P. Jordan III | Jackson | 1964 | 2006–present | 2017–2024 | — | G.W. Bush |
| 20 | District Judge | Carlton W. Reeves | Jackson | 1964 | 2010–present | — | — | Obama |
| 21 | District Judge | Kristi Haskins Johnson | Jackson | 1980 | 2020–present | — | — | Trump |
| 22 | District Judge | Taylor B. McNeel | Gulfport | 1983 | 2020–present | — | — | Trump |
| 11 | Senior Judge | Tom Stewart Lee | Jackson | 1941 | 1984–2006 | 1996–2003 | 2006–present | Reagan |
| 15 | Senior Judge | David C. Bramlette | Natchez | 1939 | 1991–2006 | — | 2006–present | G.H.W. Bush |
| 16 | Senior Judge | Louis Guirola Jr. | Gulfport | 1951 | 2004–2018 | 2010–2017 | 2018–present | G.W. Bush |
| 17 | Senior Judge | Keith Starrett | Hattiesburg | 1951 | 2004–2019 | — | 2019–present | G.W. Bush |

== Former judges ==
| # | Judge | Born–died | Active service | Chief Judge | Senior status | Appointed by | Reason for termination |
|---|---|---|---|---|---|---|---|
| 1 | George Adams | 1784–1844 | 1838 (Note: Reassigned from the District of Mississippi. Jointly appointed to the Northern and the Southern Districts of Mississippi.) | — | — | Jackson/Operation of law | resignation |
| 2 | Samuel J. Gholson | 1808–1883 | 1839–1861 (Note: Jointly appointed to the Northern and the Southern Districts of Mississippi.) | — | — | Van Buren | resignation |
| 3 | Robert Andrews Hill | 1811–1900 | 1866–1891 | — | — | A. Johnson | retirement |
| 4 | Henry Clay Niles | 1850–1918 | 1891–1918 (Note: Recess appointment; formally nominated on December 10, 1891, confirmed by the United States Senate on January 11, 1892, and received commission the same day. Jointly appointed to the Northern and the Southern Districts of Mississippi.) | — | — | B. Harrison | death |
| 5 | Edwin R. Holmes | 1878–1961 | 1918–1936 (Note: From 1918 to 1929, Judge Holmes was jointly appointed to the Northern and the Southern Districts of Mississippi.) | — | — | Wilson | elevation |
| 6 | Sidney Carr Mize | 1888–1965 | 1937–1965 | 1961–1962 | — | F. Roosevelt | death |
| 7 | William Harold Cox | 1901–1988 | 1961–1982 | 1962–1971 | 1982–1988 | Kennedy | death |
| 8 | Dan Monroe Russell Jr. | 1913–2011 | 1965–1983 | 1971–1982 | 1983–2011 | L. Johnson | death |
| 9 | Walter Nixon | 1928–present | 1968–1989 | 1982–1989 | — | L. Johnson | removal |
| 10 | William H. Barbour Jr. | 1941–2021 | 1983–2006 | 1989–1996 | 2006–2021 | Reagan | death |
| 13 | Walter J. Gex III | 1939–2020 | 1986–2004 | — | 2004–2020 | Reagan | death |
| 14 | Charles W. Pickering | 1937–present | 1990–2004 | — | — | G.H.W. Bush | elevation |

== Chief judges ==
Chief judges have administrative responsibilities with respect to their district court. Unlike the Supreme Court, where one justice is specifically nominated to be chief, the office of chief judge rotates among the district court judges. To be chief, a judge must have been in active service on the court for at least one year, be under the age of 65, and have not previously served as chief judge.

A vacancy is filled by the judge highest in seniority among the group of qualified judges. The chief judge serves for a term of seven years, or until age 70, whichever occurs first. The age restrictions are waived if no members of the court would otherwise be qualified for the position.

When the office was created in 1948, the chief judge was the longest-serving judge who had not elected to retire, on what has since 1958 been known as senior status, or declined to serve as chief judge. After August 6, 1959, judges could not become or remain chief after turning 70 years old. The current rules have been in operation since October 1, 1982.

== Succession of seats ==
Seat 1
Seat reassigned from District of Mississippi on June 18, 1838 by 5 Stat. 247 (concurrent with Southern District)
| Adams | 1838 |
| Gholson | 1839–1861 |
| Hill | 1866–1891 |
| Niles | 1892–1918 |
| Holmes | 1918–1936 |
Seat reassigned solely to Southern District on March 1, 1929 by 45 Stat. 1422
| Mize | 1937–1965 |
| Russell Jr. | 1965–1983 |
| Lee | 1984–2006 |
| Jordan III | 2006–present |

Seat 2
Seat established on May 19, 1961 by 75 Stat. 80
| Cox | 1961–1982 |
| Barbour Jr. | 1983–2006 |
| Reeves | 2010–present |

Seat 3
Seat established on May 18, 1966 by 80 Stat. 75
| Nixon Jr. | 1968–1989 |
| Pickering | 1990–2004 |
| Starrett | 2004–2019 |
| Johnson | 2020–present |

Seat 4
Seat established on July 10, 1984 by 98 Stat. 333
| Wingate | 1985–present |

Seat 5
Seat established on July 10, 1984 by 98 Stat. 333
| Gex III | 1986–2004 |
| Guirola Jr. | 2004–2018 |
| McNeel | 2020–present |

Seat 6
Seat established on December 1, 1990 by 104 Stat. 5089
| Bramlette III | 1991–2006 |
| Ozerden | 2007–present |

== List of U.S. Attorneys ==
The U.S. Attorney is the chief law enforcement officer for the Southern District of Mississippi.

- Richard M. Gaines (1840–1850)
- Horatio J. Harris (1850–1859
- Carnot Posey (1859–1866)
- R. Leachman (1866–1869)
- G. Gordon Adam (1869–1870)
- E. Phillip Jacobson (1870–1873)
- William E. Dedrick (1875–1876)
- Luke Lea (1876–1885)
- J. Bowmar Harris (1885–1888)
- A. H. Longino (1888–1889)
- Albert M. Lea (1889–1897)
- Robert C. Lee (1897)
- Albert M. Lea (1897–1901)
- Robert C. Lee (1903–1915)
- Joseph George (1915–1919)
- Julian P. Alexander (1919–1921)
- Edward E. Hindman (1921–1929)
- Ben F. Cameron (1929–1933)
- Robert M. Bourdeaux (1933–1938)
- Toxey Hall (1938–1947)
- Joseph E. Brown (1947–1954)
- Robert E. Hauberg (1954–1980)

== See also ==
- Courts of Mississippi
- List of current United States district judges
- List of United States federal courthouses in Mississippi
