= Bryant Clark =

American politician (born 1974)

Bryant W. Clark

Member of the Mississippi House of Representatives from the 47th district
- Incumbent
- Assumed office 2004
- Preceded by: Robert G. Clark Jr.

Personal details
- Born: October 31, 1974 (age 52) Jackson, Mississippi, U.S.
- Party: Democratic
- Education: Mississippi Valley State University (BS); Mississippi College (JD)
- Occupation: Attorney
- Website: www.bryantwclark.com

Bryant W. Clark (born October 31, 1974) is an American politician from Mississippi. A member of the Democratic Party, Clark is a member of the Mississippi House of Representatives, and represents the 47th district. He has served in the Mississippi House since 2004. He succeeded his father, Robert G. Clark Jr.

The district includes parts of Attala, Holmes and Yazoo counties, which is located in central Mississippi. The district comprises both the Hills and Mississippi Delta regions of the state.

== Early life and education ==
Clark is a lifelong resident of Ebenezer, located in southern Holmes County. In 1967, his father was elected as the first post-Reconstruction era black state legislator in Mississippi, serving until 2003. Bryant is a 1993 graduate of McClain High School in Lexington. After completing high school, he attended Holmes Community College in Goodman, Mississippi where he received his Associate of Arts degree in 1995. After completing his studies at Holmes, he attended Mississippi Valley State University in Itta Bena, Mississippi. In 1998, he graduated magna cum laude from Mississippi Valley State with a Bachelor of Science degree in biology. During his undergraduate career, he also studied at Stillman College in Alabama and the University of Mississippi in Oxford, Mississippi.

In 2000, he entered the Mississippi College School of Law in Jackson, Mississippi. While in law school, Clark served as a senator for the Law School Student Government Association. He was an active member of the Black Law Student Association and of many other organizations. In December 2002, he received his Juris Doctor degree from the Mississippi College School of Law. He has been admitted to the Mississippi Bar and is licensed to practice before the Mississippi Supreme Court, the U.S. Court of Appeals for the 5th Circuit, the U.S. District Courts for the Northern and Southern Districts of Mississippi and the all state courts of Mississippi.

== Career ==
Clark is the President of the Holmes County Branch of the National Association for the Advancement of Colored People (NAACP). He is the past Vice President and 2nd Congressional District Coordinator of the Young Democrats of Mississippi. In 2004, he was elected to both the Holmes County Democratic Executive Committee and State Democratic Executive Committee. For four years he served as the Secretary of the State Democratic Executive Committee. In 2002, he was awarded the Distinguished Young Democrat award by the state party.

== Mississippi House of Representatives ==
=== Committee assignments ===
Clark has served on several important committees which include the Education, Judiciary A, Juvenile Justice, Public Health & Human Services and Wildlife, Fisheries & Parks, Water & Conservation, Transportation committees. He is the past Vice Chair of the Rules Committee and past Secretary of the Public Health & Human Services Committee. He is Vice Chair of the Water & Conservation Committee. Clark also belongs to the Mississippi Legislative Black Caucus, House Democratic Caucus, House Sportsman's Caucus. In 2012, he was elected the Deputy Leader of House Democratic Caucus.

=== Tenure ===
Clark was first elected to the Mississippi legislature in 2003 after his father Robert G. Clark, Jr. retired. He was reelected in 2007 and 2011.

His father had been active in the civil rights movement and was elected to the Mississippi House of Representatives in 1967, after the Voting Rights Act of 1965 was passed, and black voters were enabled again to register and vote in the South. Robert Clark Jr. was the first African American elected to the Mississippi State Legislature since the Reconstruction era and was reelected through the following three-plus decades. He was serving as Speaker Pro Tempore of the state house when he retired in 2003.
