= Terry Day (American football) =

American football player (born 1974)

No. 78, 95
- Position: Defensive end

Personal information
- Born: September 18, 1974 (age 52); Pickens, Mississippi, U.S.
- Listed height: 6 ft 4 in (1.93 m)
- Listed weight: 290 lb (132 kg)

Career information
- High school: Williams-Sullivan (Durant, Mississippi)
- College: Holmes CC (1993–1994); Mississippi State (1995–1996)
- NFL draft: 1997: 4th round, 102nd overall pick

Career history
- New York Jets (1997–1998); Berlin Thunder (2000); Chicago Bears (2000)*
- * Offseason or practice squad member only
- Stats at Pro Football Reference

Terry Lee Day (born September 18, 1974) is an American former professional football defensive end who played one season with the New York Jets of the National Football League (NFL). He played college football at Holmes Community College and Mississippi State, and was selected by the Jets in the fourth round of the 1997 NFL draft.

== Early life and college ==
Terry Lee Day was born on September 18, 1974, in Pickens, Mississippi. He attended Williams-Sullivan High School in Durant, Mississippi.

Day first played college football at Holmes Community College from 1993 to 1994. He transferred to play for the Mississippi State Bulldogs of Mississippi State University from 1995 to 1996. He missed three games his senior year due to a sprained knee. Day was inducted into the Holmes Community College Sports Hall of Fame in 2014.

== Professional career ==
Day was selected by the New York Jets in the fourth round, with the 102nd overall pick, of the 1997 NFL draft. He officially signed with the team on July 17, 1997. He played in one game for the Jets during the 1997 season. Day was placed on the reserve/non-football injury list on August 25, 1998, and missed the entire 1998 season. He was released by the Jets on July 30, 1999.

Day was a member of the Berlin Thunder of NFL Europe in 2000.

He signed with the Chicago Bears on August 4, 2000. He was released on September 5, 2000.
