= Hazel Brannon Smith =

American journalist and publisher

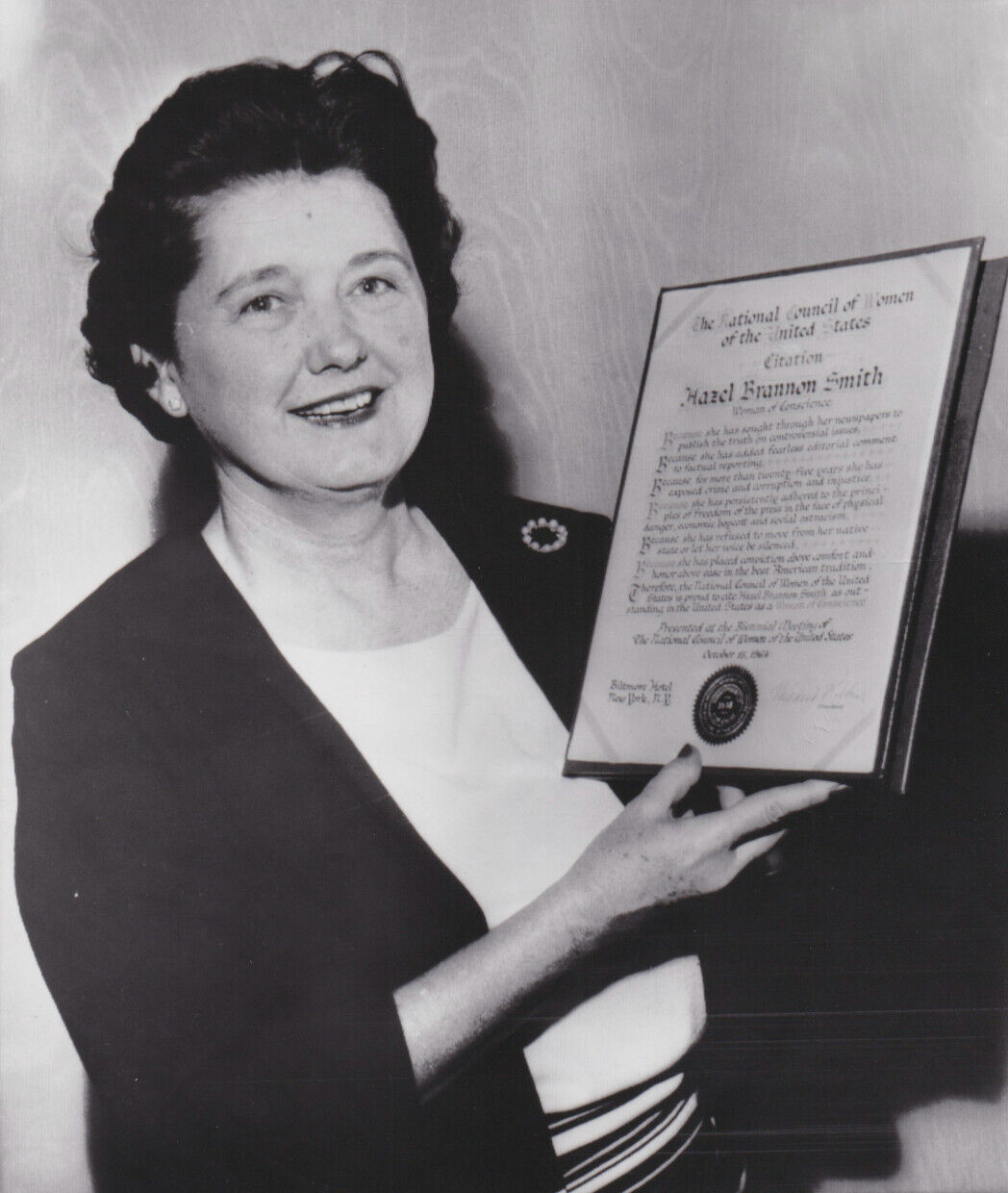
Smith in 1964

Hazel Freeman Smith (née Brannon; February 4, 1914 – May 15, 1994) was an American journalist and publisher, the owner and editor of four weekly newspapers in rural Mississippi, mostly in Holmes County. Her newspapers included the Lexington Advertiser, the second oldest newspaper in the state. She distinguished herself both in reporting and editorial writing, advocating for justice for African Americans in the county and the state.

In 1964, she became the first woman to receive the Pulitzer Prize for Editorial Writing, largely for her writing about the Civil Rights Movement in the year of the Mississippi Freedom Democratic Party. She received numerous other awards for her work as a publisher and editor.

A lifelong Baptist, Smith described herself as "just a little editor in a little spot. A lot of other little editors in a lot of little spots is what helps make this country. It's either going to help protect that freedom that we have, or else it's going to let that freedom slip away by default."

== Biography ==
Hazel Freeman Brannon was born in 1914 in Alabama City, Alabama. She attended local schools and was raised a Baptist by her parents. In 1930, she graduated at the age of 16 from high school in Gadsden. She showed an early interest in journalism, working on a local paper before college. She attended the University of Alabama and graduated in 1935 with a B.A. in journalism.

After graduation, she went to Durant, Mississippi and bought the failing Durant News of Holmes County. This majority-black county, long dominated by agriculture, was bordered on the west by the Yazoo River and was part of the Mississippi Delta. By 1943 she had turned the Durant paper around.

She bought another weekly, The Lexington Advertiser, based in the nearby county seat of Lexington, where she lived. It was the second oldest newspaper in the state. She edited and published the Lexington Advertiser, the major newspaper in Holmes County, for four decades from 1943 to 1985.

In 1956, Smith acquired the Banner County Outlook (Flora, Mississippi) and the Northside Reporter (Jackson, Mississippi), the latter based in the state capital.

In 1950, she married Walter Dyer Smith, known as "Smitty", whom she had met on an around-the-world cruise. He was working as the ship's purser. He settled with her in Holmes County and became a county hospital administrator.

== Reporting the facts and writing editorials ==
Smith became known for her editorials and her column ("Through Hazel's Eyes"), which focused on unpopular causes, political corruption, and social injustice in Mississippi, particularly Holmes County. This agricultural county of 27,000 had a majority-black population, many of whom were poor. As early as April 1943, she indicated her independence by a feature front-page story in her Durant paper about an African-American civic group that donated money to the local Red Cross. Most newspapers at the time reported on African Americans only when they were involved in crimes.

Smith was a woman of the South and had absorbed many of its mores. But she wrote in support of a county venereal disease clinic, and encouraged law enforcement to act against illegal bootlegging and gambling. She initially wrote against the United States Supreme Court ruling in Brown v. Board of Education (1954), saying the races preferred separation, and that southern states needed to work on their own solutions.

In 1954, Smith attracted attention for her reporting of the sheriff shooting Harry Randall in the leg, after a confrontation in which he told the man to get moving. Smith criticized Sheriff Richard Byrd for harassing a black resident and called for his resignation. He filed a libel suit against her, winning in the lower court, but a state court of appeals overturned the verdict against her.

After 1954 Smith no longer supported segregation in her editorials. She became known for her truthful reporting and sympathy for justice for African Americans. Gradually she began to express a progressive position, editorializing in favor of the civil rights movement and against activities of the White Citizens Council.

Following the Supreme Court decision in Brown v. Board of Education, White Citizens' Council were established across the state, especially in black-majority counties, to oppose school desegregation. The state also established the taxpayer-funded Mississippi State Sovereignty Commission, ostensibly to promote and market the state. But it established a secret police arm that conducted surveillance of private citizens, made lists of suspected activists, and made these available to private groups to conduct suppression of civil rights activism.

Smith's editorials and fair reporting attracted the wrath of local and eventually state segregationists. In 1956, the Citizens' Council of Holmes County forced the firing of her husband Walter B. Smith from his position as county hospital administrator, affecting their economic stability. This was the kind of economic blackmail being used against civil rights activists across the state: African Americans were fired for being members of the NAACP, others were evicted from rental housing, and some businesses were boycotted in an effort to suppress activism.

In 1959, the Citizens' Council in Holmes County started the Holmes County Herald to compete with Smith's newspaper, The Lexington Advertiser.

In 1960, Smith received the Elijah P. Lovejoy Award for Courage in Journalism from the International Conference of Weekly Newspaper Editors and Southern Illinois University. On Halloween 1960, an eight-foot tall cross was burned on the lawn of her home. While this was a sign of the Ku Klux Klan, she attributed the incident to teenagers having learned hate from their parents.

Beginning in 1961, Smith faced an outright economic boycott on advertising, as the White Citizens Council increased its opposition after learning that she was printing jobs for African-American activists. Smith attracted support among other newspaper publishers, such as Hodding Carter, Jr. of Greenville, Mississippi. In 1961, he organized a committee to raise money to help her.

In December 1961, Smith began to print the Mississippi Free Press, founded by activists in an effort to get their news out to the African-American community in the state. Most white-owned newspapers carried only negative coverage of their efforts, if any. Smith later undertook other printing jobs for African-American customers: the monthly Baptist Observer and books for the black Baptist Convention. These jobs helped support her newspaper. She also hired blacks to work in the printing plant and became more familiar with them personally and their political struggle.

Smith continued to report fuller accounts of local news, for instance providing the details of the police shooting in June 1963 of Alfred Brown, an African-American Navy veteran of World War II and father of five who was fatally shot soon after being released from a mental hospital. She described the racism of the police in this incident, including their refusal to let Brown's family go to his aid.

In the civil rights years and later, African Americans in Holmes County said they gained optimism from seeing her as an example of a "white person [who] showed the capacity to change and the willingness to join them."

Initially Holmes County was relatively quiet in terms of civil rights activity, but this changed in 1963 and 1964. In 1964 Smith welcomed the 33 SNCC volunteers who came to the county to educate African Americans and prepare them for registering and voting in what was known as "Mississippi Freedom Summer". Smith wrote,

"One of the most popular misconceptions in Mississippi is the idea that if everyone would just leave us alone we would work out all our problems and everything would be fine. . . . The truth is we have been left pretty much alone for nearly one hundred years – and we have not faced up to our problems as well as we should."

In 1964 Smith was awarded the Pulitzer Prize for Editorial Writing for her body of work, for editorials opposing the activities of the White Citizens' Council and its support of segregation. Her citation noted her "steadfast adherence to her editorial duty in the face of great pressure and opposition." At the same time, she represented herself as a moderate, perhaps to keep as broad a base as possible in her effort to change people's minds.

Smith continued to be affected by the violence of this period. In September 1964, her Northside Reporter, located in the state capital of Jackson, was bombed. In 1967, shortly before the Advertiser was to go to press, her printing plant in Lexington was set on fire by arsonists. Smith managed to publish a "miniature version" of her paper for that edition.

The WCC's continued boycott of customers and advertisers of her papers took a severe financial toll. In 1965, the Columbia Journalism Review established a fund for Smith: other journalists and editors raised nearly $2,700 nationally. Her local support was even greater: blacks from across the economic spectrum in Holmes County raised more than $2855 to help her. The latter money was presented to her on Editor's Appreciation Day by Dr. Arenia Mallory at Saints Junior College, an event organized by African Americans in Holmes County to counter the activities of the White Citizens Council.

In the 1970s Smith finally sold two of her newspapers because of continued financial problems. She was not able to recover financially from economic boycotts. In 1982 her husband died in a fall at home. In 1985 she filed for bankruptcy, and was forced to close her remaining two newspapers, including the Lexington Advertiser. It was the second oldest newspaper in the state, and its building still stands in Lexington, deteriorating and "open to the elements." None of these small newspapers survived the loss of her leadership and changes to the industry.

In 1986 Smith moved to live with her sister and her family in Gadsden, Alabama, her hometown, suffering from early symptoms of apparent Alzheimer's disease. She later moved to be near nieces in Tennessee. She died there in 1994 in a nursing home in Cleveland, Tennessee. Her body was returned to Alabama, where she was buried near family members in Gadsden.

== Legacy and honors ==
Smith received other recognition in addition to the Pulitzer Prize: awards from the National Federation of Press Women (1946, 1955), the Herrick Award for Editorial Writing (1956), the Mississippi Press Association (1957). She won the Golden Quill Award of the International Society of Weekly Newspaper Editors in 1963, and in 1964 was named by the National Council of Women as the "Woman of Conscience" that year. She was president of the International Society of Weekly Newspaper Editors in 1981–82.

== Death ==
Hazel Freeman Smith died in Cleveland, Tennessee on May 15, 1994, aged 80.

== Papers ==
Smith's 1945-1976 papers are available to researchers and held at the Special Collections department of the Mississippi State University Library.

== Films ==
Smith was one of the subjects in the documentary film An Independent Voice (1973) about small-town newspaper editors. Her life was dramatized in the ABC-TV movie A Passion for Justice: The Hazel Brannon Smith Story (1994), with Jane Seymour in the title role. The movie aired several weeks before Smith died.
