= 1967 Mississippi House of Representatives election =

- November 8, 1967

122 seats in the Mississippi House of Representatives 62 seats needed for a majority
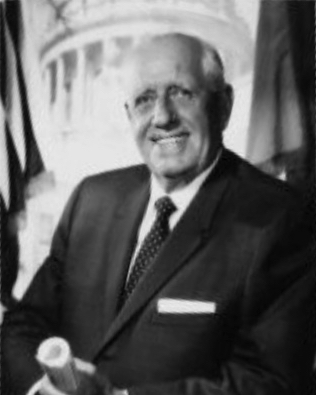

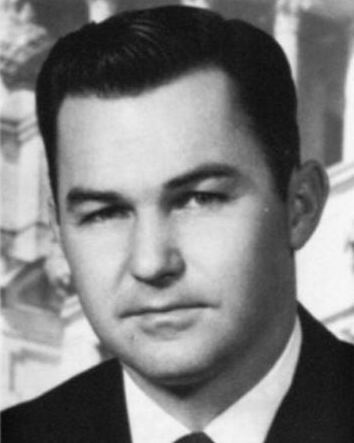
	Majority party	Minority party
Leader	John R. Junkin	Lewis McAllister (defeated)
Party	Democratic	Republican
Leader since	November 9, 1966	February 25, 1963
Leader's seat	41st–Adams Co. p. 1	35th–Lauderdale Co. p. 1
Last election	121 seats	1 seat
Seats before	120	2
Seats won	121	0
Seat change	Steady	▼1
	Third party
Party	Independent
Last election	0 seats
Seats before	0
Seats won	1
Seat change	▲1
- Results: Democratic hold Democratic gain Independent Democratic gain
Speaker before election
John R. Junkin
Democratic
Elected Speaker
John R. Junkin
Democratic

Elections to the Mississippi House of Representatives were held on November 8, 1967, to elect 122 candidates to serve a four-year term in the 1968–1972 session of the Mississippi Legislature. All three Republican state legislators, including two in the House, lost re-election to Democratic nominees, and Democrats lost one seat to Black independent candidate Robert G. Clark Jr. in Holmes County whose candidacy was supported by the Mississippi Freedom Democratic Party, which targeted three seats in the legislature. Clark became the first Black state legislator in the state since the Reconstruction Era. This election was the first to take place since federal courts reapportioned the state legislative maps, reducing the number of House districts to fifty-two after overturning a plan instituted by the Legislature in 1966.

This election took place alongside races for governor and for the state senate.

== Candidates elected ==
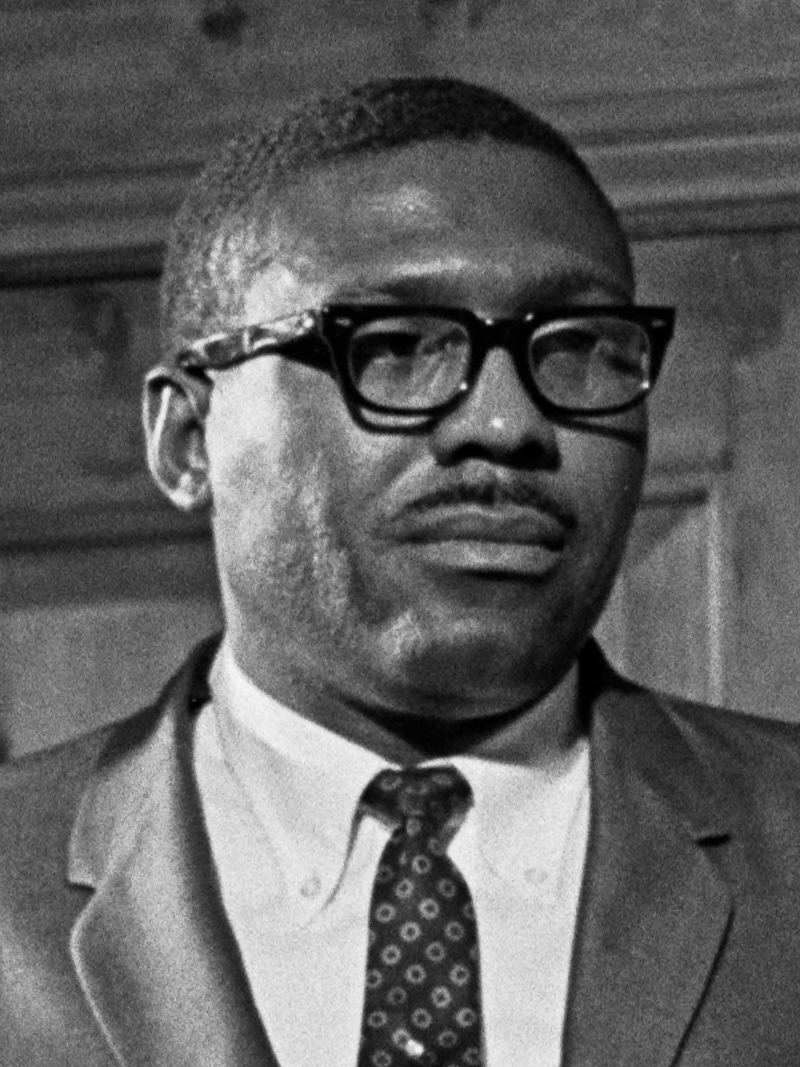
Robert G. Clark Jr. was elected as the first Black member of the Mississippi Legislature since the Reconstruction Era.

The following candidates were returned at the 1967 election (women in Italics, Blacks in Bold):

- District 1 (Alcorn and Tishomingo)
  - Post 1: Clyde Burns, Route 1, Glenn
  - Post 2: W. A. Stevens, Corinth
- District 2 (Prentiss)
  - George Estell, Baldwyn
- District 3 (Tippah and Union)
  - Post 1: Edgar Stephens, New Albany
  - Post 2: Leland Grisham, Ripley
- District 4 (Benton, DeSoto and Marshall)
  - Post 1: Gladys Slayden, Holly Springs
  - Post 2: Dudley Bridgforth, Hernando
  - Post 3: T. M. Stone, Potts Camp
- District 5 (Tate)
  - W. E. Callicott, Senatobia
- District 6 (Tunica)
  - Sterling Seabrook, Tunica
- District 7 (Coahoma and Quitman)
  - Post 1: Malcolm Mabry, Dublin
  - Post 2: Kenneth Williams, Clarksdale
  - Post 3: Ney Gore, Marks
  - Post 4: Harry E. Neblett, Jonestown
- District 8 (Lafayette and Panola)
  - Post 1: Edwin Perry, Oxford
  - Post 2: Todd McCullough, Pope
  - Post 3: Hubert Finnie, Courtland
- District 9 (Pontotoc)
  - De Van Dallas, Pontotoc
- District 10 (Itawamba and Lee)
  - Post 1: Robert M. Webb Jr., Saltillo
  - Post 2: A. C. Lambert, Tupelo
  - Post 3: Jerry Wilburn, Mantachie
- District 11 (Monroe)
  - Post 1: Charles Allen, Amory
  - Post 2: H. Redman Mitchell, Amory
- District 12 (Chickasaw)
  - James H. Blue, Houston
- District 13 (Calhoun)
  - George Swindoll, Calhoun City
- District 14 (Tallahatchie and Yalobusha)
  - Post 1: George Payne Cossar, Charleston
  - Post 2: Oscar P. Mackey, Water Valley
- District 15 (Leflore and Sunflower)
  - Post 1: Charles Deaton, Greenwood
  - Post 2: Estes McDaniel, Greenwood
  - Post 3: O. B. Bennett, Sunflower
  - Post 4: Clyde Wood, Moorhead
  - Post 5: Hugh Arant, Ruleville
- District 16 (Bolivar)
  - Post 1: J. A. Thigpen, Cleveland
  - Post 2: Dana Moore, Cleveland
  - Post 3: John Pearson, Rosedale
- District 17 (Issaquena, Sharkey and Washington)
  - Post 1: Frank Carlton, Greenville
  - Post 2: Douglas Abraham, Greenville
  - Post 3: H. L. Merideth, Greenville
  - Post 4: Hainon Miller, Greenville
  - Post 5: C. B. Newman, Valley Park
- District 18 (Humphreys)
  - David Halbrook, Belzoni
- District 19 (Holmes and Yazoo)
  - **Post 1: Robert G. Clark Jr., Ebenezer (Independent/MFDP)**
  - Post 2: Tommy Campbell, III, Yazoo City
  - Post 3: Hervey Hicks, Benton
- District 20 (Grenada and Montgomery)
  - Post 1: E. L. Boteler, Grenada
  - Post 2: Gary Moore, Winona
- District 21 (Attala and Carroll)
  - Post 1: Alton Massey, Kosciusko
  - Post 2: Clarence Pierce, Vaiden
- District 22 (Choctaw and Webster)
  - W. B. Meek, Eupora
- District 23 (Clay)
  - Wyndell Carty, West Point
- District 24 (Lowndes and Oktibbeha)
  - Post 1: Ben Owen, Columbus
  - Post 2: Cline Gilliam, Columbus
  - Post 3: Horace Harned, Starkville
  - Post 4: Thomas McCrary, Columbus
- District 25 (Winston)
  - Charles Stewart, Louisville
- District 26 (Noxubee)
  - C. T. Crabtree, Macon
- District 27 (Kemper and Neshoba)
  - Post 1: Marvin B. Henley, Philadelphia
  - Post 2: Helen McDade, DeKalb
- District 28 (Leake)
  - James H. Turner, Carthage
- District 29 (Madison)
  - Post 1: P. L. Hughes, Madison
  - Post 2: Milton Case, Canton
- District 30 (Hinds)
  - Post 1: Russell Davis, Jackson
  - Post 2: Fred J. Lotterhos Jr., Jackson
  - Post 3: Sutton Marks, Jackson
  - Post 4: Ralph Sowell, Raymond
  - Post 5: Robert Ferguson, Raymond
  - Post 6: Horace Lester, Jackson
  - Post 7: Stephen Beach, Jackson
  - Post 8: Joe Moss, Raymond
  - Post 9: Charles Mitchell, Jackson
  - Post 10: Emmett Owens, Jackson
- District 31 (Claiborne and Warren)
  - Post 1: Donald M. Cross, Vicksburg
  - Post 2: H. L. McKnight, Vicksburg
  - Post 3: Robert L. Vaughan, Port Gibson
- District 32 (Rankin)
  - Post 1: James Morrow, Brandon
  - Post 2: Carroll Kennedy, Brandon
- District 33 (Scott and Smith)
  - Post 1: E. B. Livingston, Morton
  - Post 2: Daniel Harvey, Magee
- District 34 (Newton)
  - Raymond Comans, Decatur
- District 35 (Lauderdale)
  - Post 1: Ed Jolly, Collinsville
  - Post 2: Dan Johnson, Meridian
  - Post 3: Betty Jane Long, Meridian
  - Post 4: John Perkins, Meridian
- District 36 (Clarke)
  - R. H. Donald Jr., Quitman
- District 37 (Jasper)
  - W. T. Ruffin, Bay Springs
- District 38 (Jefferson Davis and Simpson)
  - Post 1: Jack Warren, D'Lo
  - Post 2: Kirby Thompson, Prentiss
- District 39 (Copiah and Lawrence)
  - Post 1: R. E. Anderson, Wesson
  - Post 2: Harold Fortenberry, Monticello
- District 40 (Jefferson and Lincoln)
  - Post 1: Clark Reeves, Bogue Chitto
  - Post 2: Tullius Brady, Brookhaven
- District 41 (Adams)
  - Post 1: John R. Junkin, Natchez
  - Post 2: J. Walter Brown, Natchez
- District 42 (Amite, Franklin and Wilkinson)
  - Post 1: Homer L. Smith, Liberty
  - Post 2: James A. Robertson Jr., Liberty
- District 43 (Pike)
  - Post 1: George S. Carruth, Summit
  - Post 2: William S. Guy, McComb
- District 44 (Marion and Walthall)
  - Post 1: Vasco Singley, Columbia
  - Post 2: Neil Smith, Tylertown
- District 45 (Covington and Jones)
  - Post 1: John Neill, Laurel
  - Post 2: James Liston Shows, Soso
  - Post 3: Estus Graham, Ellisville
  - Post 4: Ralph Herrin, Collins
- District 46 (Forrest and Lamar)
  - Post 1: Stone Barefield, Hattiesburg
  - Post 2: Rex Jones, Hattiesburg
  - Post 3: Robert L. Lennon, Hattiesburg
  - Post 4: Mack Graham, Sumrall
- District 47 (Wayne)
  - Rab Sanderson, Waynesboro
- District 48 (Greene and Perry)
  - Henry L. Jones, Richton
- District 49 (George and Stone)
  - W. A. Wilkerson, Benndale
- District 50 (Hancock and Pearl River)
  - Post 1: Lonnie Smith, Poplarville
  - Post 2: Walter Phillips, Bay St. Louis
- District 51 (Harrison)
  - Post 1: Jim True, Long Beach
  - Post 2: Tommy Gollott, Biloxi
  - Post 3: Clyde Woodfield, Mississippi City
  - Post 4: C. L. Bullock, Gulfport
  - Post 5: Eldon L. Bolton, Biloxi
  - Post 6: James C. Simpson, Pass Christian
  - Post 7: William A. Tisdale, Biloxi
- District 52 (Jackson)
  - Post 1: N. C. Everett, Moss Point
  - Post 2: Marby Penton, Ocean Springs
  - Post 3: Ted Millette, Pascagoula
