= John Junkin (disambiguation) =

John Junkin (1930–2006) was an English actor and scriptwriter.

John Junkin may also refer to:

- John Junkin (politician) (born 1949), Irish Unionist politician
- John R. Junkin (1896–1975), American politician

== See also ==
- John Junkins (born 1943), American academic
