= Saints Academy =

Saints Academy may refer to:

- Saints Academy (Mississippi), a school in Mississippi
- Southampton F.C. Under-21s and Academy, English football club
