= Lexington Historic District =

Lexington Historic District may refer to:

- Lexington Historic District (Lexington, Georgia), listed on the NRHP in Oglethorpe County, Georgia
- Lexington Historic District (Lexington, Mississippi), NRHP-listed
- Uptown Lexington Historic District, Lexington, North Carolina, listed on the NRHP in Davidson County, North Carolina
- Lexington Historic District (Lexington, Virginia), listed on the NRHP in Lexington, Virginia
- Several entries on the National Register of Historic Places listings in Fayette County, Kentucky
