= S.V. Marshall High School =

Location
- Coordinates: 33.1667°N 90.1837°W

Information
- Closed: 2015
- Last updated: 9 December 2017

S.V. Marshall High School was a school in unincorporated Holmes County, Mississippi, with a Lexington postal address. It was a part of the Holmes County School District. Its campus is currently occupied by S.V. Marshall Elementary School. When S. V. Marshall High was in operation, it and S. V. Marshall Elementary shared the same campus.

In 2015 the high school sectors of Marshall, J.J. McClain High School, and Williams-Sullivan High School consolidated into Holmes County Central High School.
