= Melany Neilson =

American author

- Born: December 1, 1958 (age 67); Moses Lake, Washington, U.S.
- Education: Central Holmes Academy; University of Mississippi
- Occupation: Author
- Spouse: Frederick G. Slabach
- Children: 2

Melany Neilson (born December 1, 1958, in Moses Lake, Washington) is an American author.

== Biography ==
Neilson grew up in Lexington, Mississippi, and attended the segregated Central Holmes Academy. Nelson later graduated from the University of Mississippi with a degree in English in 1979, and a master's degree in journalism in 1986.

Her first book, Even Mississippi, a memoir of Southern politics, was published in 1989, and received the Lillian Smith Award, the Mississippi Authors Award, the Gustavas Myers Outstanding Book on Human Rights, and a nomination for the Pulitzer Prize. Neilson chronicled her work with Robert Clark, the Democratic Party nominee for U.S. Congress in 1982 and 1984, and her own "evolution as a white among blacks, seeking a new Mississippi." The book chronicles Neilson's family history and its connection to old Mississippi politics, specifically "the emotional trials of a young white woman from an old Delta family who violates deeply-rooted race, caste, class and gender taboos by going to work for a black politician." Hailed as "one of the most intriguing of ... conversion narratives – and by one of the youngest of Southern converts who have written books on the subject," Even Mississippi has become a first-person narrative source for books exploring race, politics and the South.

Her first novel, The Persia Café, was published in 2001 to wide praise. The story of a race murder set in a small Mississippi River town in 1962, the novel explored themes of identity, friendship, family, race and American history with "evocative detail and a powerful sense of place." Neilson revisits many of the themes and settings of "a time when the old Southern order was on the verge of changing, when blacks were beginning to claim the rights and opportunities so long denied them and when too many whites were violently resisting them and any other whites – there certainly weren't many – who appeared sympathetic to the black cause." Neilson was criticized by some for "giving the FBI a positive role that in fact it only rarely filled in the deep South during the most difficult years of the 1960s." Most reviewers, however, focused on "the death throes of the Jim Crow South" and Neilson's ability to capture "the feel of a culture at a particular time and the ineffable moment a heart changes."

A month after the book's publication, publisher HarperCollins identified eight separate sentences similar to passages in Barbara Kingsolver's 1988 novel The Bean Trees. Neilson immediately changed the eight sentences and her publisher, St. Martin's, printed those changes in future editions. According to St. Martin's, Neilson apologized in a letter to Kingsolver for "the unintentional inclusion of the language in question," and offered to apologize in person.

Neilson is married to Frederick G. Slabach, President of Texas Wesleyan University in Fort Worth, Texas and Former chief executive officer of the Harry S. Truman Scholarship Foundation. They have two sons, Nicholas and Noel, and one daughter, Amelia.
