= Frederick G. Slabach =

American academic administrator

Frederick G. Slabach is an American lawyer and academic administrator. He is the dean of University of Mississippi School of Law, a role he has held since 2023.

== Early life ==
Slabach earned his bachelor's degree from Mississippi College, his Juris Doctor degree from the University of Mississippi School of Law, and his Master of Laws degree from Columbia Law School.

== Career ==
Slabach began his career in politics, holding several policy roles. He subsequently was the president of the Harry S. Truman Scholarship Foundation. In 2011, he became president of Texas Wesleyan University.

== Personal life ==
Slabach is married to author Melany Neilson; they have three children.
