= Williams-Sullivan High School =

Location
- 14494 Highway 51; Durant, Mississippi 39063; United States; 33.0651°N 89.8620°W

Information
- School type: Public
- Status: Closed
- School district: Holmes County School District
- Grades: K - 12
- Website: Official website

Williams-Sullivan High School was a PreK–12 school in unincorporated Holmes County, Mississippi, with a Durant postal address. It was a part of the Holmes County School District. Its campus is currently occupied by Williams-Sullivan Elementary School. When Williams-Sullivan High was in operation, all grade levels shared the same campus.

In 2015 the high school sectors of Williams-Sullivan, S.V. Marshall High School, and J.J. McClain High School consolidated into Holmes County Central High School.
