= Goodman, Mississippi =

- Town
- Flag

- Location of Goodman, Mississippi

- Location in the United States
- Coordinates: 32°58′5″N 89°54′45″W
- Country: United States
- State: Mississippi
- County: Holmes

Government
  - Mayor: Anthony Mullins

Area
  - Total: 0.83 sq mi (2.15 km^{2})
  - Land: 0.82 sq mi (2.13 km^{2})
  - Water: 0.0077 sq mi (0.02 km^{2})
- Elevation: 266 ft (81 m)

Population (2020)
  - Total: 1,258
  - Density: 1,530.1/sq mi (590.79/km^{2})
- Time zone: UTC-6 (Central (CST))
  - Summer (DST): UTC-5 (CDT)
- ZIP code: 39079
- Area code: 662
- FIPS code: 28-28220
- GNIS feature ID: 0670500

Goodman is a town in southeastern Holmes County, Mississippi, United States. Per the 2020 census, the population was 1,258.

== History ==
Goodman was settled by European Americans in 1860. It was first chartered on November 16, 1865, after the end of the Civil War; and rechartered on March 5, 1878. The town is named for the first president of the Mississippi Central Railroad.

Goodman is the birthplace of John A. Lomax (1867–1948), pioneering folklorist, and David Herbert Donald (1920–2009), Pulitzer-prize-winning historian.

== Geography ==
Goodman is located in southeastern Holmes County, west of the Big Black River. U.S. Route 51 passes through the center of town, leading northeast 8 miles (13 km) to Durant and southwest 7 miles (11 km) to Pickens. Mississippi Highway 14 crosses US 51 near the center of town, leading east 25 miles (40 km) to Kosciusko and west 11 miles (18 km) to Ebenezer. Highway 14 intersects Interstate 55 3 miles (5 km) west of the center of Goodman, at Exit 146. I-55 leads south 50 miles (80 km) to Jackson, the state capital, and north 158 miles (254 km) to Memphis, Tennessee.

According to the United States Census Bureau, Goodman has a total area of 0.85 square miles (2.2 km^{2}), of which 0.01 square miles (0.02 km^{2}), or 0.91%, are water.

== Demographics ==
Historical population
Census	Pop.	Note	%±
1880	378		—
1890	354		−6.3%
1900	442		24.9%
1910	603		36.4%
1920	589		−2.3%
1930	608		3.2%
1940	609		0.2%
1950	878		44.2%
1960	932		6.2%
1970	1,194		28.1%
1980	1,285		7.6%
1990	1,256		−2.3%
2000	1,252		−0.3%
2010	1,386		10.7%
2020	1,258		−9.2%
U.S. Decennial Census; 2010 2020

=== Racial and ethnic composition ===
Goodman town, Mississippi – Racial and ethnic composition Note: the US Census treats Hispanic/Latino as an ethnic category. This table excludes Latinos from the racial categories and assigns them to a separate category. Hispanics/Latinos may be of any race.
Race / Ethnicity (NH = Non-Hispanic)	Pop 2000	Pop 2010	Pop 2020	% 2000	% 2010	% 2020
White alone (NH)	415	328	266	33.15%	23.67%	21.14%
Black or African American alone (NH)	817	1,028	939	65.26%	74.17%	74.64%
Native American or Alaska Native alone (NH)	2	2	6	0.16%	0.14%	0.48%
Asian alone (NH)	0	2	0	0.00%	0.14%	0.00%
Native Hawaiian or Pacific Islander alone (NH)	0	0	0	0.00%	0.00%	0.00%
Other race alone (NH)	0	0	3	0.00%	0.00%	0.24%
Mixed race or Multiracial (NH)	10	10	24	0.80%	0.72%	1.91%
Hispanic or Latino (any race)	8	16	20	0.64%	1.15%	1.59%
Total	1,252	1,386	1,258	100.00%	100.00%	100.00%

=== 2000 Census ===
As of the census of 2000, there were 1,252 people, 280 households, and 206 families residing in the town. The population density was 1,523.3 inhabitants per square mile (588.1/km^{2}). There were 303 housing units at an average density of 368.7 per square mile (142.4/km^{2}). The racial makeup of the town was 65.81% African American, 33.23% White, 0.16% Native American, and 0.80% from two or more races. Hispanic or Latino of any race were 0.64% of the population.

There were 280 households, out of which 42.1% had children under the age of 18 living with them, 36.4% were married couples living together, 32.9% had a female householder with no husband present, and 26.4% were non-families. 25.7% of all households were made up of individuals, and 9.6% had someone living alone who was 65 years of age or older. The average household size was 2.96 and the average family size was 3.58.

In the town, the population was spread out, with 25.9% under the age of 18, 39.0% from 18 to 24, 18.1% from 25 to 44, 10.1% from 45 to 64, and 6.9% who were 65 years of age or older. The median age was 20 years. For every 100 females, there were 103.6 males. For every 100 females age 18 and over, there were 93.3 males.

The median income for a household in the town was $13,929, and the median income for a family was $14,643. Males had a median income of $30,000 versus $17,500 for females. The per capita income for the town was $8,359. About 49.0% of families and 45.6% of the population were below the poverty line, including 63.0% of those under age 18 and 35.9% of those age 65 or over.

== Education ==
The town of Goodman is served by the Holmes County School District. It is served by Goodman-Pickens Elementary School, between Goodman and Pickens. In 2006 the school had about 379 students. High school students go to Holmes County Central High School.

The Goodman Campus of Holmes Community College (formerly known as Holmes Junior College) is located here.

== Notable people ==
- Ode Burrell, former American Football League player
- Charles Davis, jazz saxophonist and composer
- Mattie Delaney, Delta blues singer and guitarist
- David Herbert Donald (1920–2009), Pulitzer-prize-winning historian.
- John Lomax, musicologist and folklorist
- Buddy Scott, blues guitarist
- Wirt Williams, novelist, journalist and professor of English, who was three times nominated for the Pulitzer Prize
