= Terry Babcock-Lumish =

American economist

- Born: Terry Lumish
- Education: Carnegie Mellon University (BS); Indiana University School of Public and Environmental Affairs (MPA); Oxford University (DPhil)
- Occupations: Professor, Entrepreneur, Policymaker
- Notable credit(s): Islay Consulting LLC, President & Founder Economic, policy, and political consultancy firm (2005-present); United States Military Academy, Assistant professor of economics and senior scholarship adviser (2012–2014); Roosevelt House Public Policy Institute at Hunter College, Founding director of public policy (2011-2012); Harry S. Truman Scholarship, winner, (1996)
- Spouse: Brian Babcock-Lumish
- Website: www.consultislay.com

Terry Babcock-Lumish (née Lumish) is an American professor, entrepreneur, and policymaker. She is the Executive Secretary of the Harry S. Truman Scholarship Foundation.

== Early life ==
Babcock-Lumish grew up in Pittsburgh, Pennsylvania, and attended Upper St. Clair High School. She received a Bachelor of Science from Carnegie Mellon University. While there, she won a Harry S. Truman Scholarship. She later earned a master's degree in public affairs from Indiana University School of Public and Environmental Affairs and a Doctor of Philosophy from University of Oxford, St. John's College.

Her father, Dr. Robert Lumish, was an infectious disease specialist and Chief of Infectious Diseases at UPMC Mercy Hospital.

== Career ==
From 1999 to 2001, Babcock-Lumish worked for the United States Government as a fellow in the Presidential Management Fellows Program in the President's Council of Economic Advisers. Upon leaving the White House in 2001, she served as a researcher for two books by the Honorable Vice President Al Gore and Tipper Gore.

From 2002 to 2004, Babcock-Lumish was an associate fellow and research associate at the Rothermere American Institute.

From 2005 to 2008, Babcock-Lumish was a senior research associate at Harvard Law School. From there, she went on to serve as a visiting research associate at the Oxford University Centre for the Environment.

In January 2011, Babcock-Lumish was appointed as a Distinguished Lecturer and the first Newman Director of Public Policy at the Roosevelt House Public Policy Institute at Hunter College. In this position, Babcock-Lumish directed the public policy program.

From 2012 to 2014, Babcock-Lumish was an assistant professor of economics at the United States Military Academy.

In 2019, Babcock-Lumish was named the first female Executive Secretary of the Harry S. Truman Scholarship Foundation.

== Awards ==
Babcock-Lumish was named a Harry S. Truman Scholarship winner in 1996. She went on to earn the Harry S. Truman Scholarship Foundation's Elmer B. Staats Award, the Foundation's highest honor granted to one Truman Scholar annually.

Babcock-Lumish served as a Clarendon Scholarship recipient from 2002 to 2004 while reading her DPhil at Oxford.

In 2007, Babcock-Lumish received the young alumni award from Carnegie Mellon University.

In 2010, she won the Mexico International Film Festival Silver Palm Award as the consulting producer for the documentary Women on the Edge: The Mexican Immigrant Experience.

The American Swiss Foundation, the National Committee on US-China Relations' Young Leaders Forum, the Council for the US and Italy, and the British-American Project have all recognized Babcock-Lumish as a young leader.

== Published works ==
- "Trust Network Sclerosis: The Hazard of Trust in Innovation Investment Communities", Journal of Financial Transformation, Vol. 29, pp. 163–172; 2009.

In this publication, Babcock-Lumish coined the term "trust network sclerosis," describing the phenomenon in which excessive reliance on trustworthiness results in a form of decision-making lock-in.

- Pricing the Economic Landscape: Global Financial Markets and the Communities and Institutions of Risk Management, ('Political Economies of Landscape'; 2008; ISBN 9781402058493).]

=== Media appearances ===
Babcock-Lumish appeared on NBC's TODAY Show in 2014 in a segment titled Cadets, chefs break down barriers,
