= Arenia Mallory =

American civil rights activist

- Arenia Mallory, from the cover of The Crisis (May 1936)
- Born: December 28, 1904; Jacksonville, Illinois, U.S.
- Died: May 1977 (aged 72)
- Occupations: Educator, activist

Arenia Conelia Mallory (December 28, 1904 – May 8, 1977) was an American educator based in Lexington, Mississippi. She was recognized nationally as a political activist working for African-American education and civil rights. She gained a national reputation as president of Saints Industrial and Literary School, which she developed over 50 years from a few students in 1926 to a private K-12 academic school and junior college on 350 acres. It was affiliated with the Pentecostal Church of God in Christ, in which Mallory had been active since about age 18.

Mallory contributed to emerging national networks of black women. She drew from them and white philanthropists to raise money for the school. Saints was instrumental in black education in Mississippi; for many years, it was the only accredited high school for blacks in its area. It attracted students from nearly every state and from African nations due to its strong academic reputation; over the decades, Mallory educated an estimated 20,000 students through Saints.

In addition, Mallory became a national leader in the COGIC Women's Department. From the 1940s, she helped to create wider civic engagement of church women; they worked for a "sanctified world". Through the National Council of Negro Women, of which Mallory was a charter member beginning in 1935 and vice-president for many years, she worked for education and civil rights for African Americans. She engaged with national leaders such as Mary McLeod Bethune in the NCNW to raise funds to support her school in Mississippi and to draw women leaders into greater public life. In 1963, she was appointed to serve in President John F. Kennedy's administration.

Through Saints and her civic activities, Mallory promoted her advocacy for the mostly black and poor sharecroppers in the county and for the Civil Rights Movement. In 1968, she was the first woman and person of color to be elected to the Holmes County Board of Education. In 1974 she was elected to a second term.

== Biography ==
Arenia Mallory was born in Jacksonville, Illinois in 1904 to parents who were successful in show business. She originally trained as a concert pianist. At about age 17, she became involved with the Pentecostal Church of God in Christ. Her parents were more worldly, and the church's strict teachings led her to become estranged from her family. The church opposed members being involved in any show business, had dress standards that forbade women from wearing make-up, and had other restrictions. Mallory earned a bachelor's degree from Simmons College of Kentucky (1927), a historically black college.

In the course of her first decade working in Mississippi, she earned a master's degree in education in 1936 from Jackson State University, the top-ranked historically black college in the state. Later Mallory returned to university for additional graduate studies, earning a master's degree in administration from University of Illinois at Urbana-Champaign (1950). She was popularly addressed as "Dr.", as an honorific reflecting the respect she commanded.

== Career ==
As a young woman, Mallory was invited by Charles Harrison Mason, founder of the COGIC in Lexington, Mississippi, to serve as a music teacher at a local religious school for black students started by a teacher who promoted COGIC teachings. She knew there was a great need for black education in the state and evangelized for the fast-growing church. Early in her time there, she organized a group of five singers and toured with them to raise money for the school. During the heart of the Great Depression, they performed at the Abyssinian Baptist Church in Harlem, New York and raised $8,000 in donations.

Later, Mallory developed a larger school chorus, the Jubilee Harmonizers, who toured and became nationally famous. They eventually performed at the White House for President Franklin D. and Eleanor Roosevelt. Their touring helped to raise funding for what became known as the Saints Industrial and Literary School.

As Mallory became a national leader, she used payments from her own speaking engagements to build the collection of the school's library; it was the only African-American school in the area to have a well-equipped one. It became known both for its "quality education and Christian principles."

Mallory was president of the school from 1926 until her retirement in 1976, overseeing its expansion to grades K-12, and strengthening the curriculum. The campus was developed to have classrooms and dormitories worth more than one million dollars. A junior college department was developed before 1963. Saints Academy attracted students from nearly every state and from nations in Africa, educating "tens of thousands" of students.

Mallory had established high standards for Christian behavior and education. Parents who had moved north for work in the Great Migration of the first half of the 20th century often sent their children back to Lexington to be educated at Saints Academy, for a strong education on their home grounds. Through the decades, Mallory led the students through the period of integration of public schools, and the broadening role for blacks after passage of civil rights legislation. She helped develop many African-American leaders.

The school was renamed as Saints Academy, and remained affiliated with the Church of God in Christ until its closure in 2006.

== Religious and political activism ==
Mallory advocated providing health and welfare services to the mostly black and poor sharecroppers in Holmes County, Mississippi. It had been a center of cotton plantations in slavery times. Much of the rural population continued to be farmworkers.

From her early years at the school, Mallory raised money for the mostly poor students, so they would have shoes and clothes. She was instrumental in orchestrating several programs in the county to raise money, books, and clothing for her students.

In 1934, during the Great Depression, Mallory hosted the sorority Alpha Kappa Alpha (AKA) Mississippi Health Project. The sorority consisted of rural teachers in neighboring counties. Her continuing work with this sorority led to national networks, which helped gain funding for her school in Lexington.

In her focus on education, Mallory also established classes for adults, especially the parents of her students. In the 1960s, she received a grant to set up classes for migrant farm workers. She was an active member of the Church of God in Christ (COGIC) Women's Department, acting as a leader in the national church.

In that position, she met other national leaders, forming an alliance with Mary McLeod Bethune, who founded the National Council of Negro Women (NCNW) in 1935 to expand the power of the women's club movement beyond the black elites. In the 1940s and 1950s, the COGIC women worked to integrate their work toward sanctified lives with civic engagement in broader alliances outside their community.

Mallory was a strong advocate for black and women's rights. A charter member of the National Council of Negro Women, founded in 1935, she supported its goals to improve education and rights for African Americans. For years, she worked within its national network to raise money for her students and Saints Industrial School. She served as the Vice President of NCNW from 1953 to 1957.

From 1952 to 1955 in this period, Mallory also served on the board of directors of the Regional Council of Negro Leadership, a civil rights organization led by Dr. T.R.M. Howard of the all-black community, Mound Bayou, Mississippi.

Mallory was appointed as an advisor to the U.S. Department of Labor (1963) in the administration of President John F. Kennedy. Learning about the Head Start program that year, she established the first one in Mississippi at her school.

In 1968 Mallory was the first woman and first person of color to be elected to the Holmes County Board of Education. She was re-elected in 1974 to another term.

== Legacy and honors ==
- In 1946 Mallory was ranked as one of twelve outstanding women in America in a poll by the National Council of Negro Women.
- 1950, she was the only woman of the Deep South to be invited to President Harry S. Truman's inauguration.
- In March 1950 she received an honorary PhD in Laws from Bethune-Cookman College for services in rural Christian education.
- In 1952 she was chosen by her church as its representative to the World Pentecostal Convention in London, England.
- In 1955 she was chosen as a United States delegate to the 10th anniversary of the United Nations, held in San Francisco, California.
- Two facilities were named after her: the Arenia C. Mallory Community Health Center in Lexington, Mississippi, and the Arenia Mallory School of Religion in Miami, Florida.
- 1974, April 19 was declared by the governor as Dr. Arenia Conelia Mallory Day.
- The Dr. Arenia Conelia Mallory Foundation was established by alumni of Saints in the early 21st century to continue work in her name.
