= Minerva Hamilton Hoyt =

American desert preservation activist

- Born: Minerva Hamilton; March 27, 1866; Durant, Mississippi, U.S.
- Died: December 15, 1945 (aged 79); South Pasadena, California, U.S.
- Occupation: Activist
- Known for: Preserving California desert areas such as Joshua Tree National Park

Minerva Hamilton Hoyt (March 27, 1866 – December 15, 1945) was an early American activist who worked to preserve California desert areas, and promoted the establishment of Joshua Tree National Park. Born on a Mississippi plantation, she later lived in East Coast cities with her physician husband before they moved to South Pasadena, California, in 1897. There she gradually became deeply interested in desert plants and habitat.

== Early life and move to California ==
Minerva Hamilton was born on March 27, 1866, on a plantation near Durant, Mississippi, to an upper-class family. She attended a local school for white students, many from the planter class.

After marrying Dr. Albert Sherman Hoyt, they lived for a time in New York and Baltimore, and had four children together, of which two daughters survived her.

In 1897, they moved to South Pasadena, California. In California, Hoyt used her influence as a wealthy socialite to support civic causes. Among these was the Los Angeles Philharmonic.

== Preserving natural habitat ==
Hoyt became interested in Southern California's desert plants through her interest in gardening, particularly cactus and Joshua Trees. After the death of her husband in 1918, she became concerned that increased automobile traffic in the desert was threatening the area.

Hoyt began to exhibit desert plants across the country, to educate people about their qualities. Exhibitions included the national 1928 Garden Club of America show in New York, where the work was seen and commented on by Secretary of Agriculture William Jardine. She later exhibited as far as London. The exhibitions were significant efforts—for the New York exhibition, seven freight cars of rocks, plants, and sand were shipped across the country, and fresh flowers were flown in.

In March 1930, Hoyt founded the International Desert Conservation League. Throughout the 1930s she worked to encourage the state of California to create three parks: Joshua Tree, Death Valley, and Anza-Borrego Desert. Though initially thwarted, in 1936, she gained support by the administration of President Franklin D. Roosevelt, which designated more than 800,000 acres in California desert area as the Joshua Tree National Monument.

She also worked to appeal to the Mexican government, appealing to the latter to set aside 10,000 acres for cactus preservation.

== Legacy and honors ==
- In 1931, a species of Mexican cactus was named after Hoyt (mammillaria hamiltonhoytea).
- In 2013, the US Board of Geographic Names named a peak within Joshua Tree after Minerva Hoyt.
- The Joshua Tree National Park Association annually honors "notable achievement on behalf of the deserts of California" with a Minerva Hoyt Award.
- Asteroid 7321 Minervahoyt, discovered by American astronomers Eleanor Helin and Schelte Bus at the Siding Spring Observatory in 1979, was named in her memory. The official naming citation was published by the Minor Planet Center on 27 August 2019 (M.P.C. 115893).
