= Durant, Mississippi =

- City
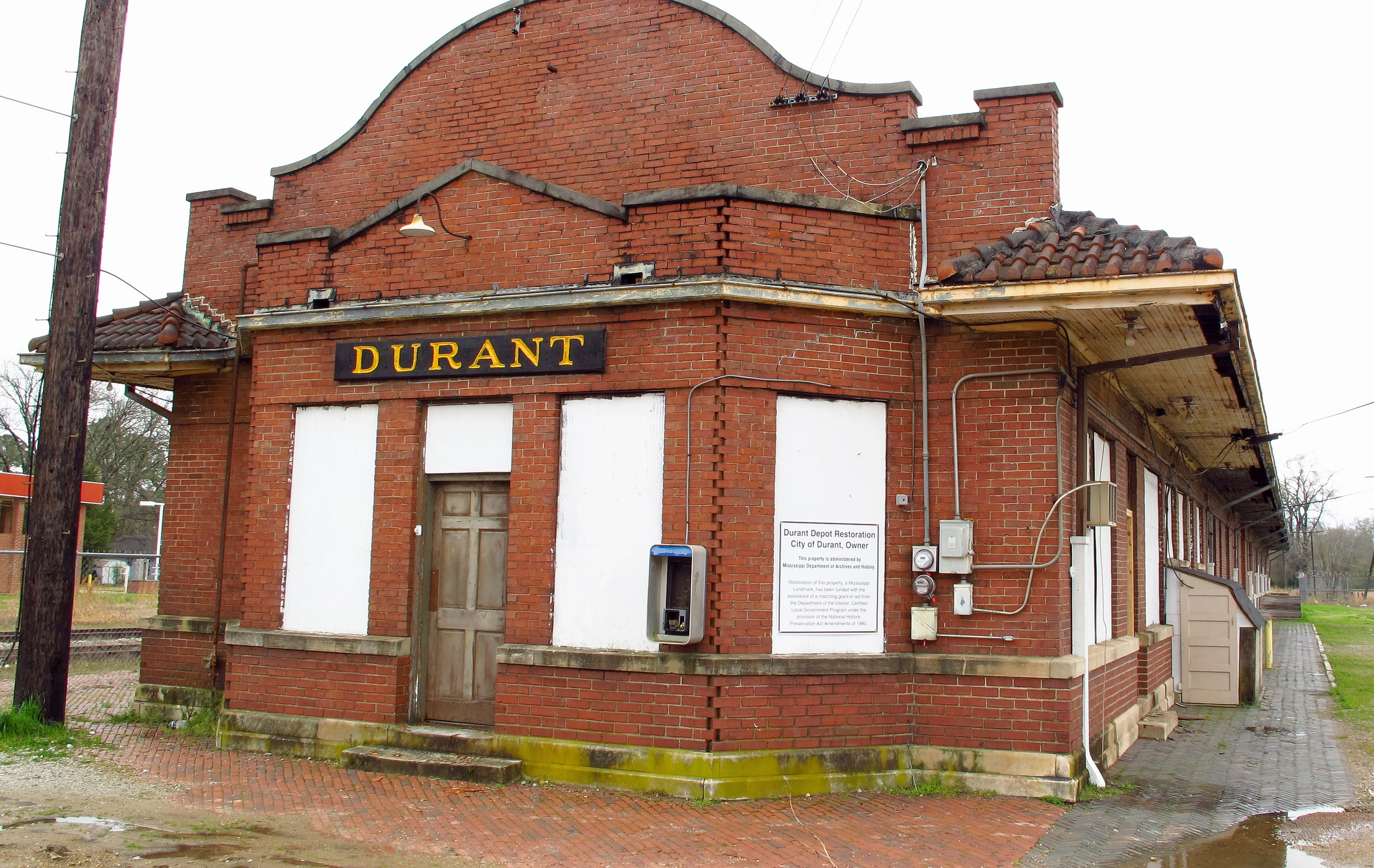
- Train station in Durant

- Seal

- Location of Durant, Mississippi

- Location in the United States
- Coordinates: 33°4′35″N 89°51′23″W
- Country: United States
- State: Mississippi
- County: Holmes

Government
  - Mayor: John Haynes

Area
  - Total: 2.26 sq mi (5.86 km^{2})
  - Land: 2.24 sq mi (5.80 km^{2})
  - Water: 0.023 sq mi (0.06 km^{2})
- Elevation: 259 ft (79 m)

Population (2020)
  - Total: 2,231
  - Density: 996.1/sq mi (384.59/km^{2})
- Time zone: UTC-6 (Central (CST))
  - Summer (DST): UTC-5 (CDT)
- ZIP code: 39063
- Area code: 662
- FIPS code: 28-20500
- GNIS feature ID: 0669521
- Website: https://www.cityofdurantms.com/

Durant is a city near the central eastern border of Holmes County, Mississippi, United States, and Big Black River. The town was founded in 1858 as a station on the Mississippi Central Railroad, later part of the Illinois Central. Durant was named for Louis Durant, a Choctaw chief who had lived on this site before the United States undertook Indian Removal in the 1830s, forcing him and most of the Choctaw to Indian Territory west of the Mississippi River.

As of the 2020 census, Durant had a population of 2,231.

About 3 miles away is the Castalian Springs Hotel, believed in 2020 to be the only surviving such spa structure in the state. A dozen mineral springs resorts were identified in the Works Progress Administration (WPA) Guide to Mississippi (1938), written during the Great Depression. Such springs were believed to have healing properties.

== History ==
The Choctaw are a Native American tribe who occupied much of Mississippi as part of their territory well before any European exploration. They were among a succession of indigenous cultures established here for thousands of years. After they were forced to cede most of their land to the United States and to remove to Indian Territory in the 1830s, an increasing number of European Americans migrated here to develop the land for large cotton plantations. Before the Civil War, this was known as the "dark corner of the county."

Cotton plantations were developed along the waterfronts to take advantage of the fertile soil and to have access to the rivers, which was the basis of transportation until later in the 19th century, when trains were developed. Planters exploited the labor of numerous black enslaved African Americans. The county has a majority black population.

The Castalian Springs Hotel, a two-story wooden building, was associated with the spa based at natural mineral springs and developed as a resort. Located 3 miles west of Durant, it reportedly was one of many sites used as a hospital to treat the more than 10,000 casualties of Confederate troops following the Battle of Shiloh in Tennessee in April 1862. Researchers are attempting to confirm if the existing building dates to the Civil War, or was a later replacement. Wounded troops were carried south by trains, and towns were asked if their people could care for them. Soldiers were taken from the train at the Durant station and carried by wagon to the hotel. About 90 Confederate soldiers died here through November 1863, and were buried in the Wesley Chapel Cemetery, about one-half mile away. All their graves were marked with new tombstones in the 1990s, as former temporary markers had been lost.

After the war, the hotel was adapted for other uses, first as a private girls' boarding school, educating the daughters of planters and others who could afford it. The large property, which included acreage, was later used for the state YMCA camp. Later still it became a missionary camp, to prepare Protestant missionaries for service in rural areas overseas. Finally the hotel was boarded up and vacant for some years. About 2020, it was purchased by a local pair of brothers. They have held some church retreats here and related large events, and may develop some of it as a hunting camp. The hotel is believed to be the only surviving mineral springs resort of what were a dozen in the state during the 1930s, according to the WPA Guide to Mississippi (1938).

=== 20th century to present ===
Beginning in 1890, white Democrats in Mississippi passed a new constitution and laws disenfranchising African Americans and closing them out of formal political participation. Jim Crow laws were passed confining them to second-class status, which persisted for decades past the middle of the 20th century. Although thousands of African Americans left the state in the Great Migration, seeking better opportunities elsewhere, those who remained in Holmes County in working to regain their constitutional rights, including to register and vote.

About 1935, Hazel Brannon Smith, a recent college graduate from Gadsden, Alabama, bought the local weekly newspaper, the Durant News, which had been failing. Over the next several years, she turned it around, and served as its editor and publisher into the early 1970s.

In the 1950s she also acquired the Lexington Advertiser, and later two other small papers, and was based in Lexington, the county seat. She was among the first journalists to cover the African-American community for its positive contributions, for instance, noting in 1943 during World War II that a local civic group had donated money to the Red Cross. Later she became well known for her editorial writing about the civil rights movement; Holmes County had many activists involved in education and voter registration. In 1964 Smith was the first woman to be awarded the Pulitzer Prize for Editorial Writing.

The area is still largely rural and agricultural, but industrial-scale farming and mechanization reduced the need for labor decades ago. Many residents left, but among those who stayed, there is considerable unemployment. The population has declined although state and local government have sought redevelopment. The historic brick train depot (see photo above) is to be restored for new uses and is being highlighted as part of the area's heritage tourism. Other historic resources are being highlighted.

Since the late 20th century, missionary nurses from orders outside the state have been among those working on behalf of poor city and county residents. Local and state citizens were shocked on August 25, 2016 when two 68-year-old nuns were found stabbed to death at their home on Castalian Springs Road: Sister Paula Merrill was a nurse practitioner with the Sisters of Charity of Nazareth in Kentucky, and Sister Margaret Held was a nurse practitioner with the School Sisters of St Francis in Milwaukee. Rodney Earl Sanders, from nearby Kosciusko, was charged with the murders. The Mississippi Bureau of Investigation (MBI) participated in investigation of the case.

== Geography ==
Durant is in eastern Holmes County on the west side of the valley of the Big Black River. U.S. Route 51 passes through the center of town, leading north 19 miles (31 km) to Vaiden and south 8 miles (13 km) to Goodman. Mississippi Highway 12 intersects US 51 in Durant; it leads east 17 miles (27 km) to Kosciusko and west 13 miles (21 km) to Lexington. Interstate 55 has an interchange with Highway 12 3 miles (5 km) west of Durant; I-55 leads south 61 miles (98 km) to Jackson, the state capital, and north 148 miles (238 km) to Memphis.

According to the United States Census Bureau, Durant has a total area of 2.3 square miles (5.9 km^{2}), of which 0.02 square miles (0.06 km^{2}), or 1.04%, are water.

== Demographics ==
Historical population
Census	Pop.	Note	%±
1870	375		—
1880	724		93.1%
1890	1,259		73.9%
1900	1,766		40.3%
1910	1,881		6.5%
1920	1,870		−0.6%
1930	2,480		32.6%
1940	2,510		1.2%
1950	2,311		−7.9%
1960	2,617		13.2%
1970	2,752		5.2%
1980	2,889		5.0%
1990	2,838		−1.8%
2000	2,932		3.3%
2010	2,673		−8.8%
2020	2,231		−16.5%
U.S. Decennial Census

=== Racial and ethnic composition ===
Durant city, Mississippi – Racial and ethnic composition Note: the US Census treats Hispanic/Latino as an ethnic category. This table excludes Latinos from the racial categories and assigns them to a separate category. Hispanics/Latinos may be of any race.
Race / Ethnicity (NH = Non-Hispanic)	Pop 2000	Pop 2010	Pop 2020	% 2000	% 2010	% 2020
White alone (NH)	833	368	207	28.41%	13.77%	9.28%
Black or African American alone (NH)	2,049	2,278	1,964	69.88%	85.22%	88.03%
Native American or Alaska Native alone (NH)	2	5	1	0.07%	0.19%	0.04%
Asian alone (NH)	9	0	0	0.31%	0.00%	0.00%
Native Hawaiian or Pacific Islander alone (NH)	0	1	0	0.00%	0.04%	0.00%
Other race alone (NH)	2	5	0	0.07%	0.19%	0.00%
Mixed race or Multiracial (NH)	14	9	42	0.48%	0.34%	1.88%
Hispanic or Latino (any race)	23	7	17	0.78%	0.26%	0.76%
Total	2,932	2,673	2,231	100.00%	100.00%	100.00%

=== 2020 census ===
As of the 2020 census, Durant had a population of 2,231. The median age was 36.6 years. 28.2% of residents were under the age of 18 and 15.8% of residents were 65 years of age or older. For every 100 females there were 85.3 males, and for every 100 females age 18 and over there were 80.2 males age 18 and over.

0.0% of residents lived in urban areas, while 100.0% lived in rural areas.

There were 831 households in Durant, of which 35.5% had children under the age of 18 living in them. Of all households, 22.4% were married-couple households, 19.1% were households with a male householder and no spouse or partner present, and 49.9% were households with a female householder and no spouse or partner present. About 31.8% of all households were made up of individuals and 13.6% had someone living alone who was 65 years of age or older.

There were 939 housing units, of which 11.5% were vacant. The homeowner vacancy rate was 0.4% and the rental vacancy rate was 8.3%.

Racial composition as of the 2020 census
Race	Number	Percent
White	213	9.5%
Black or African American	1,974	88.5%
American Indian and Alaska Native	1	0.0%
Asian	0	0.0%
Native Hawaiian and Other Pacific Islander	1	0.0%
Some other race	0	0.0%
Two or more races	42	1.9%

=== 2010 census ===
As of the census of 2010, there were 2,673 people, 1,171 households, and 978 families residing in the city. The population density was 1,316.4 inhabitants per square mile (508.3/km^{2}). There were 1,209 housing units at an average density of 542.8 per square mile (209.6/km^{2}). The racial makeup of the city was 13.80% White, 85.29% African American, 0.22% Native American, 0% Asian, 0.29% from other races, and 0.33% from two or more races. Hispanic or Latino of any race were 0.26% of the population.

There were 1,171 households, out of which 33.9% had children under the age of 18 living with them, 35.9% were married couples living together, 30.1% had a female householder with no husband present, and 30.7% were non-families. 28.7% of all households were made up of individuals, and 14.3% had someone living alone who was 65 years of age or older. The average household size was 2.68 and the average family size was 3.32.

In the city, the population was spread out, with 31.6% under the age of 18, 6.2% from 20 to 24, 30.1% from 25 to 49, 15.7% from 50 to 64, and 13.2% who were 65 years of age or older. The median age was 32 years. There were 1,230 males and 1,443 females.

The median income for a household in the city was $19,659, and the median income for a family was $25,065. Males had a median income of $26,500 versus $20,200 for females. The per capita income for the city was $12,210. About 27.9% of families and 35.1% of the population were below the poverty line, including 44.1% of those under age 18 and 26.7% of those age 65 or over.

== Education ==
The Durant City limits is served by the Holmes County Consolidated School District, which operates Durant Elementary School (K-8) in Durant and Holmes County Central High School near Lexington in the center of the county.

Previously Durant city was served by the Durant Public School District, which had the K-12 Durant School as its only school. Areas outside the city limits were served by the county district. In 2016 Governor of Mississippi Phil Bryant signed a bill that required the Durant district to consolidate with the Holmes County district.

As a result of the consolidation, a new school board for Holmes County was assembled by 2018. Effective July 1, 2018 the two districts were combined as the Holmes County Consolidated School District.

In March 2018 the Holmes County school board voted to move high school students in Durant to Holmes County Central, an action opposed by area residents.

== Notable people ==
- John Clay Coleman, minister, writer, and black rights activist
- John Howell, civil rights activist in Atlanta; son of Durant mayor William Edgar Howell
- Minerva Hamilton Hoyt, born on a nearby plantation; migrated to California where she worked as an activist to preserve its deserts.
- Jimmy W. "Jimi" Jamison, musician, frontman of Survivor
- Alexander Lane, (1860-1911), educator, physician, politician: born in Durant to an enslaved mother, he went as a boy to Illinois and worked with a family; graduated in 1881 from Southern Illinois Normal University as the first male African-American student, worked as a principal for 10 years; attended Rush Medical College and became a physician in Chicago in 1895; in 1906 he was elected to the Illinois state legislature, serving two terms to 1911.
- Tommy McClennan, Delta blues singer and guitarist
- Buford McGee, former National Football League running back
- Hazel Brannon Smith, journalist and publisher
- Absolom M. West, planter and slaveholder, politician, Civil War general, labor organizer and vice presidential candidate; he owned a plantation near Durant prior to the Civil War
