= Durant Public School District =

School district in Mississippi, United States

Address
- 65 West Madison Durant, Mississippi, 39063; United States
- Coordinates: 33.0782°N 89.8579°W

District information
- Type: Public
- Grades: K - 12
- Closed: July 1, 2018

The Durant Public School District was a public school district based in Durant, Mississippi, United States. The district served students in the City of Durant.

Effective July 1, 2018 the Durant school district and the Holmes County School District consolidated into the Holmes County Consolidated School District.

As of 2016 the superintendent was Edwin Robinson. It operated a single school, Durant Public School, with elementary and secondary divisions.

== History ==
Gray Tollison, chairperson of the Mississippi Senate Education Committee, wrote SB 2494, which required Durant school district to consolidate into Holmes County's district; Tollison argued that the Durant district had insufficient tax revenues to operate. The Durant school district opposed the consolidation. The bill was opposed by Democrats and supported by Republicans, passing the Mississippi House of Representatives. In 2016 Governor of Mississippi Phil Bryant signed the bill, finalizing the consolidation. As a result of the consolidation, a new school board for Holmes County was assembled by 2018.

In March 2018 the Durant school board voted to move high school students in Durant to Holmes County Central High School, an action opposed by area residents.

== Academic performance ==
As of 2016 the graduation rate was 74.6%, and the Mississippi educational authorities gave the school a "D" ranking.

== Demographics ==
=== 2006-07 school year ===
There were a total of 582 students enrolled in the Durant Public School District during the 2006-2007 school year. The gender makeup of the district was 47% female and 53% male. The racial makeup of the district was 94.67% African American, 3.26% White, 1.37% Asian, and 0.69% Hispanic. 83.9% of the district's students were eligible to receive free lunch.

=== Previous school years ===
School Year	Enrollment	Gender Makeup		Racial Makeup				
School Year	Enrollment	Female	Male	Asian	African American	Hispanic	Native American	White
2005-06	623	48%	52%	1.44%	94.22%	0.16%	–	4.17%
2004-05	632	50%	50%	0.79%	95.09%	0.16%	–	3.96%
2003-04	646	48%	52%	0.77%	94.27%	–	–	4.95%
2002-03	658	48%	52%	0.76%	92.55%	0.30%	–	6.38%

== Accountability statistics ==
	2006-07	2005-06	2004-05	2003-04	2002-03
District Accreditation Status	Accredited	Accredited	Accredited	Accredited	Accredited
School Performance Classifications
Level 5 (Superior Performing) Schools	0	0	0	0	0
Level 4 (Exemplary) Schools	0	0	1	1	0
Level 3 (Successful) Schools	1	1	1	1	1
Level 2 (Under Performing) Schools	0	0	0	0	1
Level 1 (Low Performing) Schools	0	0	0	0	0
Not Assigned	0	0	0	0	0

== See also ==
- List of school districts in Mississippi
