= Pickens, Mississippi =

- Town
- Flag Seal

- Location of Pickens, Mississippi

- Location in the United States
- Coordinates: 32°53′12″N 89°58′12″W
- Country: United States
- State: Mississippi
- County: Holmes

Government
  - Mayor: William Damon Edwards

Area
  - Total: 1.30 sq mi (3.37 km^{2})
  - Land: 1.28 sq mi (3.31 km^{2})
  - Water: 0.023 sq mi (0.06 km^{2})
- Elevation: 243 ft (74 m)

Population (2020)
  - Total: 920
  - Density: 720.6/sq mi (278.24/km^{2})
- Time zone: UTC-6 (Central (CST))
  - Summer (DST): UTC-5 (CDT)
- ZIP code: 39146
- Area code: 662
- FIPS code: 28-57200
- GNIS feature ID: 0675699

Pickens is a town in Holmes County, Mississippi, United States. Per the 2020 census, the population was 920.

== History ==
The town was named for landowner James Pickens and was incorporated in 1858.

On May 9, 1919, an African American veteran was lynched as part of the Red Summer of 1919 because of an “improper note” written to a white woman.

== Geography ==
Pickens is located in the southeast corner of Holmes County, on the west side of the Big Black River. It is bordered to the south by Yazoo County and to the east across the Big Black by Attala County.

U.S. Route 51 passes through the town, leading northeast 7 miles (11 km) to Goodman and south 19 miles (31 km) to Canton. Mississippi Highway 17 follows US 51 through Pickens, but leaves the highway south of town to lead southeast 13 miles (21 km) to Camden, and splits from US 51 north of Pickens to lead north 18 miles (29 km) to Lexington, the Holmes County seat. Mississippi Highway 432 leads west from Pickens 18 miles (29 km) to Benton. Interstate 55 passes 3 miles (5 km) west of Pickens, with access from Exit 139 (Highway 432) and Exit 144 (Highway 17). I-55 leads south 44 miles (71 km) to Jackson, the state capital, and north 70 miles (110 km) to Grenada.

According to the United States Census Bureau, the town of Pickens has a total area of 1.3 square miles (3.4 km^{2}), of which 0.03 square miles (0.07 km^{2}), or 1.96%, are water.

== Demographics ==
Historical population
Census	Pop.	Note	%±
1880	122		—
1900	504		—
1910	619		22.8%
1920	457		−26.2%
1930	635		38.9%
1940	688		8.3%
1950	638		−7.3%
1960	727		13.9%
1970	1,012		39.2%
1980	1,386		37.0%
1990	1,285		−7.3%
2000	1,325		3.1%
2010	1,157		−12.7%
2020	920		−20.5%
U.S. Decennial Census; 2010 2020

=== Racial and ethnic composition ===
Pickens town, Mississippi – Racial and ethnic composition Note: the US Census treats Hispanic/Latino as an ethnic category. This table excludes Latinos from the racial categories and assigns them to a separate category. Hispanics/Latinos may be of any race.
Race / Ethnicity (NH = Non-Hispanic)	Pop 2000	Pop 2010	Pop 2020	% 2000	% 2010	% 2020
White alone (NH)	158	138	62	11.92%	11.93%	6.74%
Black or African American alone (NH)	1,146	1,003	847	86.49%	86.69%	92.07%
Native American or Alaska Native alone (NH)	1	0	0	0.08%	0.00%	0.00%
Asian alone (NH)	0	6	3	0.00%	0.52%	0.33%
Native Hawaiian or Pacific Islander alone (NH)	0	0	0	0.00%	0.00%	0.00%
Other race alone (NH)	0	0	0	0.00%	0.00%	0.00%
Mixed race or Multiracial (NH)	3	0	6	0.23%	0.00%	0.65%
Hispanic or Latino (any race)	17	10	2	1.28%	0.86%	0.22%
Total	1,325	1,157	920	100.00%	100.00%	100.00%

=== 2000 Census ===
As of the census of 2000, there were 1,325 people, 452 households, and 333 families residing in the town. The population density was 1,062.3 inhabitants per square mile (410.2/km^{2}). There were 496 housing units at an average density of 397.7 per square mile (153.6/km^{2}). The racial makeup of the town was 11.92% White, 87.70% African American, 0.08% Native American, 0.08% from other races, and 0.23% from two or more races. Hispanic or Latino of any race were 1.28% of the population.

There were 452 households, out of which 34.3% had children under the age of 18 living with them, 34.7% were married couples living together, 33.8% had a female householder with no husband present, and 26.3% were non-families. 24.6% of all households were made up of individuals, and 11.1% had someone living alone who was 65 years of age or older. The average household size was 2.93 and the average family size was 3.52.

In the town, the population was spread out, with 30.9% under the age of 18, 11.2% from 18 to 24, 26.8% from 25 to 44, 19.7% from 45 to 64, and 11.4% who were 65 years of age or older. The median age was 30 years. For every 100 females, there were 89.3 males. For every 100 females age 18 and over, there were 81.5 males.

The median income for a household in the town was $17,330, and the median income for a family was $20,956. Males had a median income of $23,750 versus $17,574 for females. The per capita income for the town was $10,812. About 36.1% of families and 40.2% of the population were below the poverty line, including 51.4% of those under age 18 and 41.9% of those age 65 or over.

== Education ==
The town of Pickens is served by the Holmes County School District. It is served by Goodman-Pickens Elementary School, between Pickens and Goodman. In 2006 the school had about 379 students. High school students are zoned to Holmes County Central High School.

== Notable people ==
- Gus Courts, civil rights activist
- Odas Nicholson, attorney, judge and delegate to the Illinois Constitutional Convention
