= Ebenezer, Mississippi =

- Unincorporated community
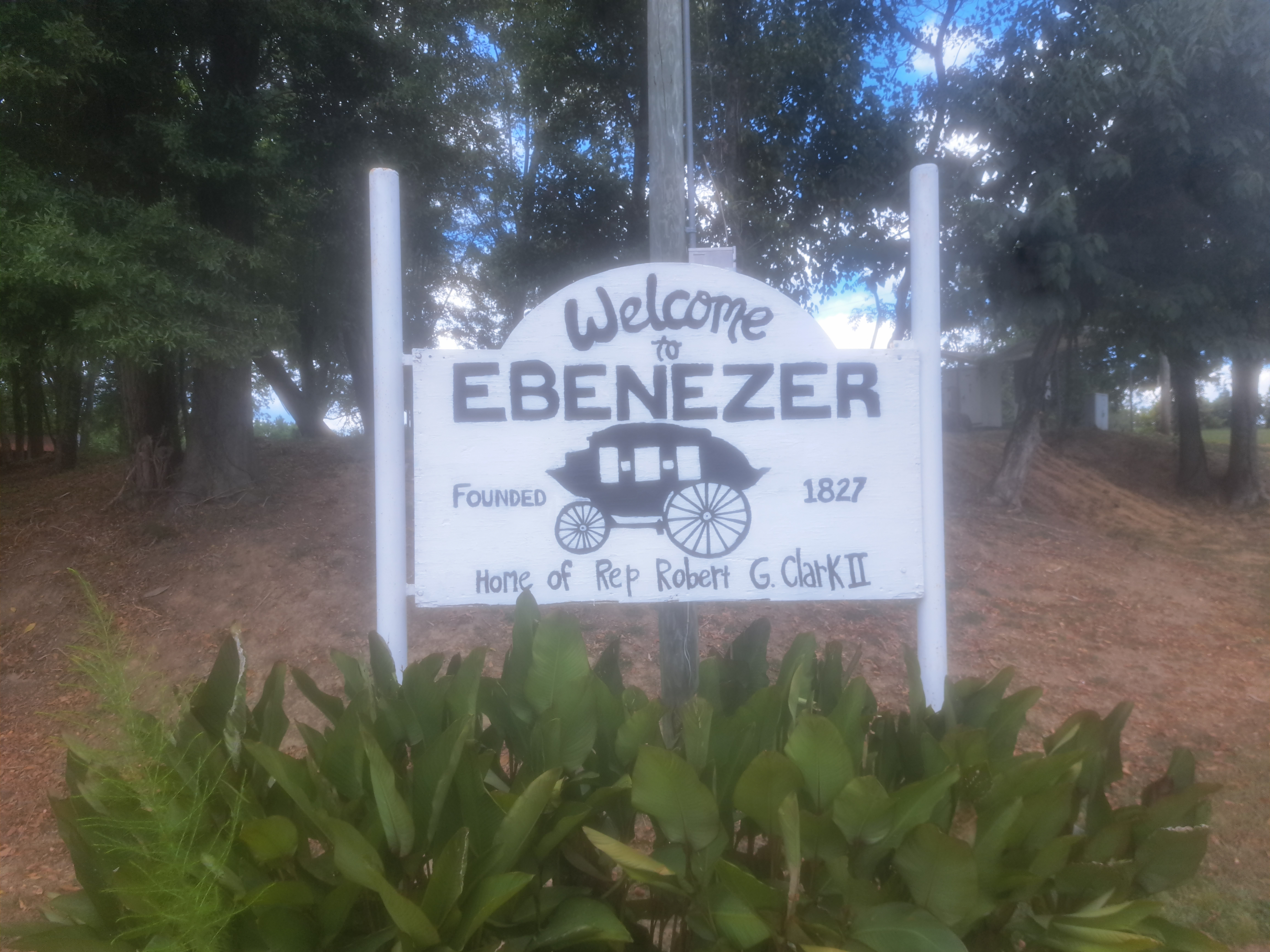
- Welcome Sign in Ebenezer

- Location within Mississippi Location within the United States
- Coordinates: 32°58′14″N 90°05′27″W
- Country: United States
- State: Mississippi
- County: Holmes
- Elevation: 331 ft (101 m)
- Time zone: UTC-6 (Central (CST))
  - Summer (DST): UTC-5 (CDT)
- ZIP code: 39095 and 39146
- Area code: 662
- GNIS feature ID: 669637

Ebenezer is an unincorporated community in Holmes County, Mississippi, United States. It is located at the western end of the eastern segment of Mississippi Highway 14, approximately 10 miles (16 km) south of Lexington, the county seat, and about 4 miles (6.4 km) west of Goodman.

According to a 1905 source, Ebenezer was named by settlers after "the old Jewish city". It may have been a destination for some German-Jewish immigrants, who began settling in Lexington and the surrounding county in the 1830s. They were later joined by Russian Jewish immigrants during the latter part of the 19th century. The Jewish community built Temple Beth El in Lexington in 1905; it closed in 2009 due to a declining population.

== Notable people ==
Perry Wilbon Howard was born in Ebenezer in 1877 to African-American parents who had been enslaved. He became an attorney and was part of the second generation of African-American lawyers in the state, practicing in Jackson, the state capital. Despite the 1890 Mississippi constitution, which effectively disfranchised most Black citizens, Howard remained active in the Republican Party. He served as a national committeeman from Mississippi and was also a civil rights advocate. Appointed as an aide in the office of the United States Attorney General during the administration of President Warren G. Harding, Howard was the highest-ranking African American in government at the time.

Robert G. Clark Jr. was born October 3, 1928, in Ebenezer and died on March 4, 2025. In 1967, he became the first African American elected to the Mississippi State Legislature since the Reconstruction era. Until 1976, he was the only African-American representative in the state house, having been reelected multiple times. In 1992, he was elected Speaker Pro Tempore of the Mississippi House of Representatives, a position he held until his retirement in 2003.
