= Monroe Saffold Jr. =

American educator, minister and bodybuilder

- Born: April 12, 1948; Lexington, Mississippi, U.S.
- Died: January 6, 2025 (aged 76); Burbank, California
- Occupations: Educator, minister, body builder
- Years active: 1966–2025
- Spouse: Patricia Saffold

Monroe Saffold Jr. (born April 12, 1948) was an American educator, minister and bodybuilder. During the 1980s and early 1990s, Saffold entered the Masters Mr. America AAU national bodybuilding competition and took first place, tall division, in 1990.

== Early life ==
Saffold was born in Lexington, Mississippi, but later moved with his family to Chicago in search of better education and financial opportunities. He was the eldest of six children to the union of his father, Monroe Sr. and mother Dixie Saffold. He and his wife Patricia raised two children Brian Saffold and Nicole Saffold Maskiell in Oak Park, Illinois, from 1980 to 2001 before moving to River Forest, where they lived until relocating to Burbank, California in 2024.

== Weight training career ==
During his teen years, Saffold became serious about weight training to improve his physique for school athletics and build strength and muscle. His earlier training sessions were spent at the Duncan YMCA located in Chicago near Westside. Saffold started competing in open bodybuilding and weightlifting tournaments. He won a number of championships most notably in 1983 where he took third place in the Junior Mr. America AAU and first place in 1990 in the Masters Mr. America AAU competition. He appeared in several different newscast programs such as WLS-TV sports, WMAQ-Channel 5 and on the Jon Gil Podcast Show. He also appeared in the press, most notably in the Sunday Chicago Sun-Times and Chicago Tribune.

== Education career and the ministry ==
Saffold attended the University of Illinois Chicago where he received a B.S. in Physical Education and a minor in Biological Sciences. He later received a M.S. in Adapted and Exercise Physiology at the same university.

He taught for the Chicago Board of Education at Lane Tech Biological Sciences Department for over 30 years and taught at several local colleges including Triton College.

Saffold completed a Master of Arts degree in Christian Ministry from North Park Seminary in 2005. He was the Associate Pastor (formerly Welcome Minister) at First Baptist Church of Oak Park until 2024.

== Contests ==
- 1983: Junior Mr. America AAU – 3rd place
- 1990: Masters Mr. America AAU - 1st place
