= Alexander Lane =

American physician and politician (1857–1911)

Alexander Mills Lane
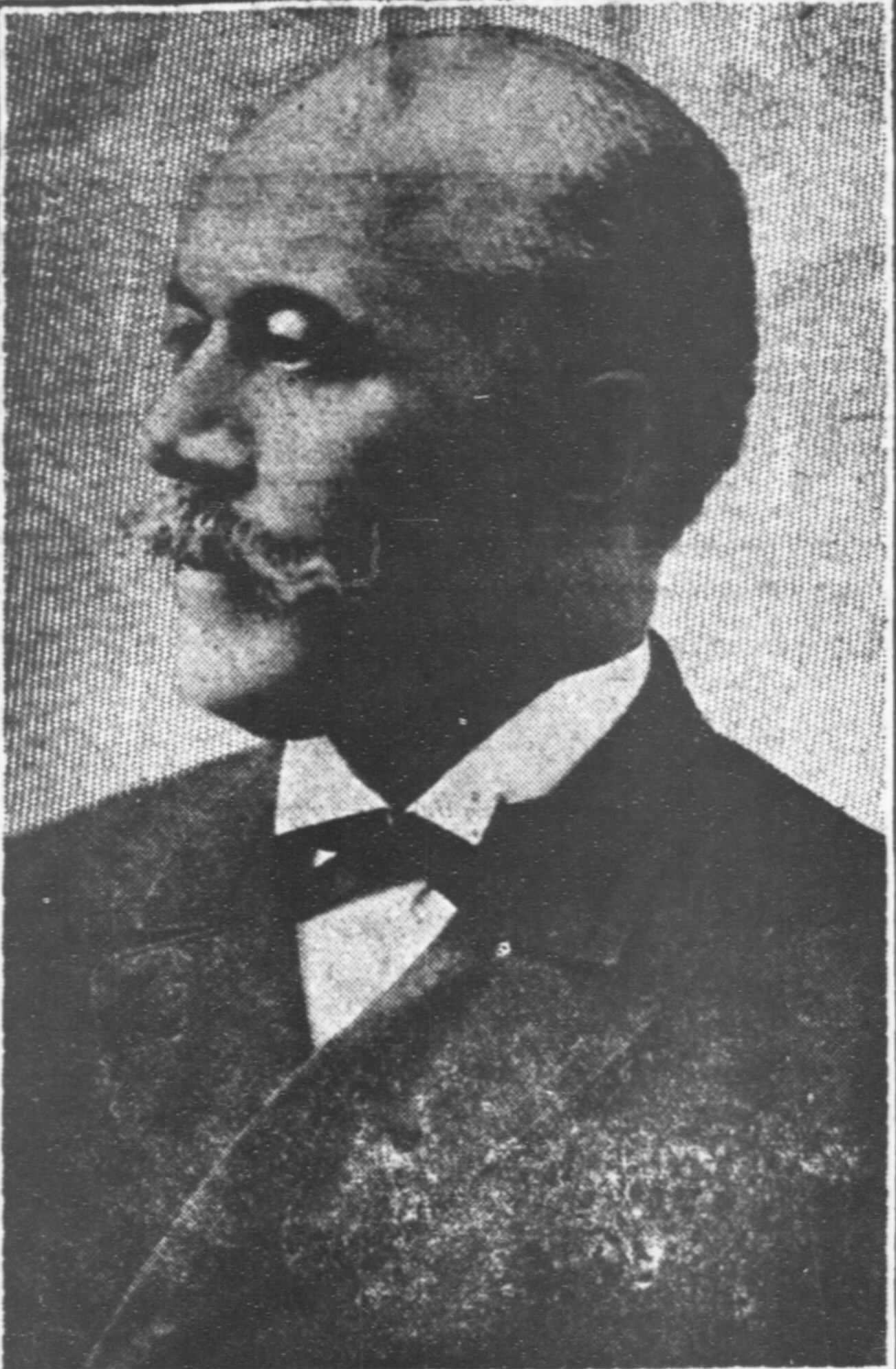

Member of the Illinois House of Representatives from the 1 district
- In office 1906–1910

Personal details
- Born: October 26, 1857 Lexington, Mississippi, U.S.
- Died: November 12, 1911 (aged 54) Chicago, Illinois, U.S.
- Resting place: Oakland Cemetery, Carbondale, Illinois, U.S.
- Party: Republican
- Spouse: Isabelle Holland (1882–)
- Children: Roscoe C. Lane
- Education: Southern Illinois University Carbondale
- Alma mater: Rush Medical College
- Occupation: Physician
- Profession: Politician

Alexander Mills Lane (October 26, 1857 – November 12, 1911) was an American physician and politician. He was a member of the Illinois House of Representatives, serving as a Republican, for two terms from 1906 until 1910. He also served as the assistant physician of Cook County, Illinois, for six years, from 1905 until his death in 1911.

== Early life and education ==
Alexander Lane was born in 1857 in Lexington, Mississippi. He moved to Tamaroa, Illinois, at age eight. He attended local public schools and after high school, entered Southern Illinois University Carbondale.

After graduating, he became a school principal at segregated school for Black children in Carbondale, Illinois. He served as principal for ten years. On September 12, 1882, he married Isabelle Holland. They had one child, a boy named Roscoe.

In 1891, he moved to Chicago and began studying medicine at Rush Medical College. He graduated from Rush with a medical degree in 1895.

== Career and life ==
In 1905, he was named assistant Cook County physician. He retained this position during his time in politics.

=== Politics ===
He served two terms in the Illinois House of Representatives. He was elected in 1906 and 1908.

== Later life and death ==
Lane became sick in early 1911 and his family convinced him to retire from his position as assistant physician of Cook County. Starting in July 2011, he was confined to his house due to his illness. Lane died on November 12, 1911, at his home in Chicago. His funeral services were held at his home on the Near South Side. The funeral was held in the African Methodist Episcopal Church tradition. He was buried at Oakland Cemetery in Carbondale.
