= Saints Academy (Mississippi) =

Location
- Coordinates: 33.0994744°N 90.0514619°W

Information
- Other name: Saints Junior College and Academy; Saints College (1954-2006)
- Former name: Saints Industrial and Literary School (1918- )
- Type: Private, Christian
- Religious affiliation: St. Paul's Church of God in Christ
- Denomination: Church of God in Christ
- Founded: 1918
- Founder: Charles H. Mason
- Closed: 2006
- President: Arenia Mallory (1926-1977)
- Grades: 1-12
- Campus size: 400 acres (160 ha)
- Last updated: 7 January 2018

Saints Academy was a private 1-12 school in Lexington, Mississippi, the county seat of Holmes County. Founded by the Church of God in Christ in 1918 as the Saints Industrial and Literary School, a school for black children in a segregated environment, it gradually expanded. Under principal Arenia Mallory from 1926-1977, the school added grades until it provided classes through high school. It had a national reputation for its strong academics and attracted students from outside the region, including from families who had migrated north.

Later an allied junior college was founded, which was known, variously, as Saints Junior College and Academy and Saints College. It closed after Mallory's death in 1977, unable to operate with a declining black population in the area and competition with publicly funded schools.

== History ==
Saints Industrial and Literary School was founded in 1918 as a ministry of St. Paul's Church of God in Christ, to provide high-quality education to black students in a segregated state. It was an all-black institution through at least the 1967-1968 school year.

Under the direction of Arenia Mallory, principal and president of the school from 1926 to 1977, the school was renamed as Saints Academy. She expanded its program through high school and created a high-quality, private alternative to the segregated public schools for black children in Holmes County. She stressed an academic education, along with music and arts. Parents from a wide area sent their children to Saints Academy, including families who had moved to northern cities such as St. Louis, Missouri. After Mallory's retirement and death, followers tried to keep the school going, but population in the Delta had declined as many families moved north or to large cities. They were unable to succeed and the school closed in 2006.

After federal courts ordered Mississippi schools to desegregate in the mid-1960s, local white parents founded Central Holmes Academy, an all-white segregation academy founded in 1967. It is located a mile from the Saints campus.

Saints Academy was notable for its inclusion in a landmark federal case, Coffey v. State Educational Finance Commission (1969) that challenged the state of Mississippi's tuition grant program for segregated schools. All of the other named schools were white-only. Saints was the only private school to receive state aid for black children. Those grants covered 80% of Saint's tuition cost in the 1967-1968 school year.

Coffey established the standards by which the Internal Revenue Service would identify segregation academies. In the course of the case, twenty-four schools were deposed and categorized according to the following criteria:

- The private school began operation the same year public schools in county were desegregated.
- No Negro pupils enrolled in the private school.
- No Negro pupils would be admitted to the private school.

== Campus ==
The campus was originally 400 acres (160 ha) in Lexington, Mississippi. Since the school closed, its buildings have been abandoned.
