= Harry S. Truman Scholarship =

American graduate fellowship

- Awarded for: Graduate study in the United States for public service leadership
- Sponsored by: Harry S. Truman Scholarship Foundation
- Established: 1975
- Website: www.truman.gov

The Harry S. Truman Scholarship is a graduate fellowship in the United States for public service leadership. It is a federally funded scholarship granted to U.S. undergraduate students for demonstrated leadership potential, academic excellence, and a commitment to public service. It is administered by the Harry S. Truman Scholarship Foundation, an independent federal agency based in Washington, D.C.

The U.S. Congress created the scholarship in 1975 as a memorial to Harry S. Truman, who served as the 33rd president of the United States. The Truman Scholarship is the official federal memorial to its namesake president. According to The Washington Post, the Truman Scholarship's "sole aim is to pick out people with potential to become leaders—then provide support to help them realize their aspirations." The scholarship supports public service oriented graduate study in the amount of $30,000.

Each year, between 50 and 60 university nominated candidates in their junior year are named Truman Scholars following an application process involving essays, recommendations, and an interview. Scholarships have historically been awarded to one individual from each U.S. state. Each university in the United States may nominate, annually, only four regularly-enrolled candidates, and up to three transfer students, who represent the most accomplished nominees from that university.

== History ==
On May 30, 1974, Senator Stuart Symington of Missouri sponsored S.3548, formally titled "A bill to establish the Harry S. Truman Memorial Scholarships." Symington held the same Class 1 Senate seat that Truman had held from 1935–1945 before becoming Vice President. The Senate passed the bill on August 2, and the House followed suit on December 17. Two similar House bills, H.R.15138 sponsored by William J. Randall of Missouri and H.R.17481 sponsored by James G. O'Hara of Michigan, were set aside in favor of Symington's bill.

The bill was signed by President Gerald Ford and enacted as Public Law 93-642 on January 4, 1975 and entered the United States Statutes at Large as 88 Stat. 2276–2280, and the United States Code as 20 U.S.C. 2001–2013. It now operates as Program 85.001, governed by 45 CFR 1801 as published in the Code of Federal Regulations in the Federal Register.

== Governance ==
The Truman Scholarship is administered by the Harry S. Truman Scholarship Foundation, an independent federal executive branch agency. The Foundation's operations are overseen by a full-time Executive Secretary, subject to the supervision and direction of the board of trustees. The current Executive Secretary is Terry Babcock-Lumish. Its endowment, which takes the form of a federal trust fund held in the U.S. Department of the Treasury, is $55 million.

=== Board of trustees ===
The board of trustees is composed of 13 members, 8 of which are appointed by the president of the United States with the consent of the United States Senate. No more than four of the presidentially-appointed members may be affiliated with the same political party. Of these eight members, one shall be a chief executive officer of a state, one a chief executive officer of a city or county, one a member of a federal court, one a member of a state court, one a person active in postsecondary education, and three representatives of the general public.

Four trustees are members of Congress, two members of different parties each from the Senate and the House of Representatives. These are appointed by the President of the Senate and the Speaker of the House, respectively.

The members are appointed to terms of six years.

In addition, the U.S. Secretary of Education, or their designee, serve as an ex officio member of the board, though is ineligible to serve as chairman.

=== Current board members ===
The current board members as of April 26, 2026:

| Position | Name | Party | Group | Confirmed | Term expiration |
|---|---|---|---|---|---|
| Member | Stacey Brandenburg | Democratic | General public | March 24, 2022 | December 10, 2025 |
| Member | Audrey K. Schuster | Democratic | General public | September 29, 2022 | December 10, 2025 |
| Member | Betty Y. Jang | Democratic | General public | February 17, 2022 | December 10, 2029 |
| Member | Todd Gloria | Democratic | CEO of a city or county | December 14, 2023 | December 10, 2029 |
| Member | Laura Cordero | Independent | State court | August 2, 2012 | December 15, 2015 |
| Member | Vacant | | Postsecondary education | | |
| Member | Vacant | | CEO of a state | | |
| Member | Vacant | | Federal court | | |
| Member | Brian Schatz | Democratic | Senate | April 9, 2019 | — |
| Member | Jerry Moran | Republican | Senate | January 30, 2023 | — |
| Member | Elise Stefanik | Republican | House of Representatives | April 14, 2025 | — |
| Member | Gabe Amo | Democratic | House of Representatives | May 13, 2025 | — |
| Member (ex officio) | Linda McMahon | Republican | Secretary of Education | March 3, 2025 | — |

=== Officers ===
The foundation also has officers assisting the board. The current officers as of April 26, 2026:

| Position | Name |
|---|---|
| President | Janet Napolitano |
| Vice-President | Andrew Rich |
| Vice-President | Max Sherman |
| Secretary | Clifton Truman Daniel |
| General Counsel | Ertharin Cousin |
| Treasurer | Frederick G. Slabach |
| Special Advisor | Roy Blunt |
| Special Advisor | Claire McCaskill |

== Qualifications ==
The scholarship is awarded to between 50 and 60 U.S. college juniors each year on the basis of four criteria: service on campus and in the community, commitment to a career in public service (government, uniformed services, research, education, or public interest/advocacy organizations), communication ability and aptitude to be a "change agent," and academic talent that would assure acceptance to a first-rate graduate school. More broadly, Truman Scholars possess intellect, leadership skills, and passion that would make them a likely force for the public good in any field.

== Application process ==
In order to apply for the scholarship, students must first be nominated by their undergraduate university. Each undergraduate institution in the United States is allowed to nominate up to four students who have attended since freshman year. The foundation receives 900 applications annually, of which between 50 and 60 will be selected. Each application is examined by a regional review panel, which selects finalists to interview. The interviews are conducted by panels of former Truman scholars, trustees of the board, and notable national public servants. The panelists make final selections of scholarship winners, attempting to choose one from each of the 50 states and American territories. No particular career, service interest, or policy field is preferred during the process. Each year, the Truman Scholarship is awarded to one or two students from institutions that have never had a Truman Scholar.

== Benefits ==
Scholars currently receive an award of $30,000 going toward up to three years of graduate education leading to a career in the public service. Winners also benefit from a network of other scholars through the Truman Scholars Association and lasting friendship, which is encouraged by the Truman Scholars Leadership Week at William Jewell College in Liberty, Missouri, and the Truman Library in Independence, Missouri, during which new scholars collaborate on policy projects.

== See also ==
- Boettcher Scholarship
- Churchill Scholarship
- The Flinn Scholarship
- Fulbright Scholarship
- Gates Cambridge Scholarship
- Harkness Fellowship
- Jardine Scholarship
- Knight-Hennessy Scholars
- Marshall Scholarship
- Mitchell Scholarship
- Presidential memorials in the United States
- Rhodes Scholarship
- Rotary Scholarships
- Schwarzman Scholars
- Thouron Award
- Udall Scholarship
- Yenching Scholarship
