= Robert G. Clark Jr. =

American politician from Mississippi (1928–2025)

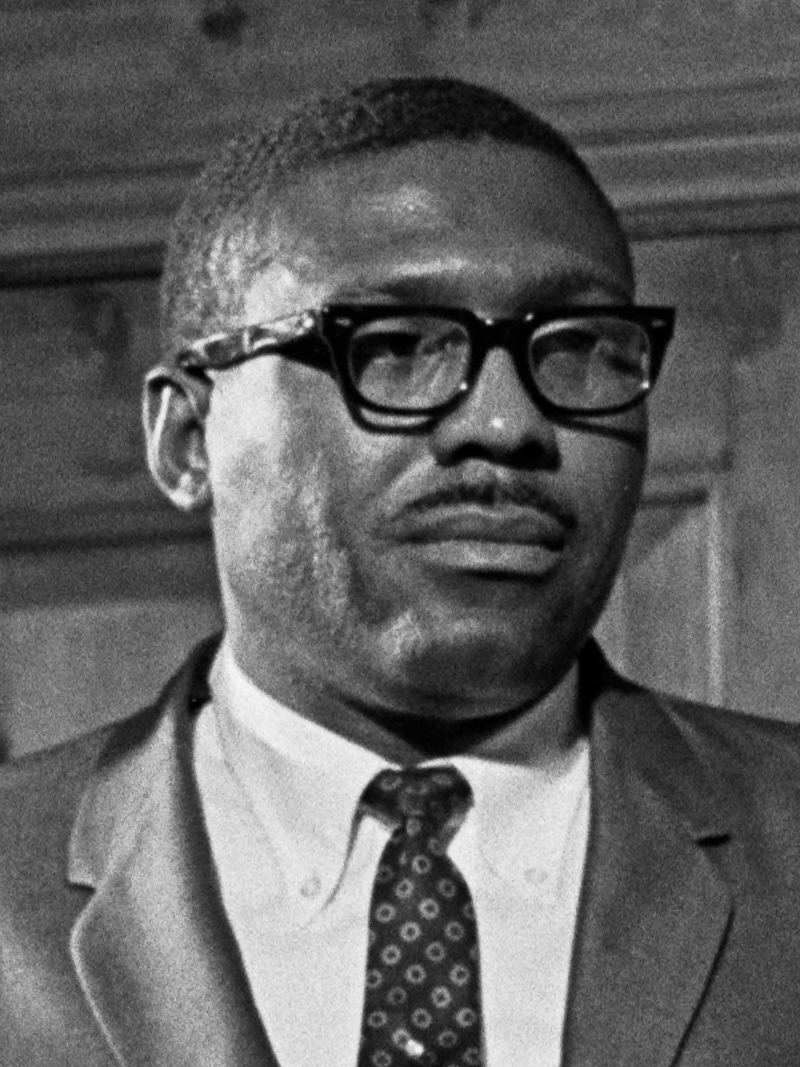
- Clark in 1967

Member of the Mississippi House of Representatives from the 47th district
- In office 1968–2003
- Succeeded by: Bryant Clark

Personal details
- Born: October 3, 1928 Ebenezer, Mississippi, U.S.
- Died: March 4, 2025 (aged 96) Ebenezer, Mississippi, U.S.
- Party: Democratic
- Children: Robert G. Clark, III; Bryant Clark
- Education: Jackson State University; Michigan State University (MA)
- Occupation: Politician, teacher, coach

Robert George Clark Jr. (October 3, 1928 – March 4, 2025) was an American politician who served in the Mississippi House of Representatives from 1968 to 2004, representing the 47th district. He was the first African-American member of the Mississippi Legislature since 1894.

== Background ==
Robert George Clark was born to a landowning family in Ebenezer, Holmes County, Mississippi; his great-grandfather had first bought land after the American Civil War and his father Robert continued to farm it.

Clark received his undergraduate degree from Jackson State University and a Master's Degree in Administration and Educational Services from Michigan State University, nearly completing his PhD before entering politics. In 1960, some 800 independent black landowners held nearly half the land area of Holmes County, an unusual situation in the state, which along with most of the American South had sharecropping as the predominant agricultural system.

Clark was twice married; his first marriage, to Essie Austin, ended with her death in 1978, and he later married Jo Ann Ross. He had two sons and a stepdaughter. He died at his home in Ebenezer on March 4, 2025, at the age of 96.

== Civil rights and politics ==
While working as a teacher in Holmes County, Mississippi, Clark became involved in the civil rights movement, which had been working to register and educate voters since 1963; his activism eventually led to dismissal from his teaching position. After the passage of the Voting Rights Act of 1965, he agreed to be a candidate in 1967 of the Freedom Democratic Party (FDP), though he was not a member. Since the assignment of a federal registrar in the county in November 1965, the FDP registered thousands of black voters for the first time since the disfranchisement of their ancestors in 1890.

Clark was elected to the Mississippi House of Representatives in 1967 by the black majority of the county, taking his seat on January 2, 1968. He was the first African American elected to the Mississippi State Legislature since the Reconstruction era. Until 1976, he was the only African-American representative in the state house. He repeatedly won re-election and served until 2003.

In 1977, Clark became the first black committee chairman in the Mississippi House of Representatives. He was named to head the Education Committee, a position he held for ten pivotal years of change and reform in Mississippi's educational system. He was at the helm of the Education Committee when the House passed the highly acclaimed 1982 Education Reform Act, as well as the 1984 Vocational Education Reform Act.

In 1982, he ran for the Mississippi's 2nd congressional district and won the Democratic nomination, but did not receive party support and lost the general election.

In January 1992, he was elected as Speaker Pro Tempore. He was re-elected to that position at the start of the 1996 session and again re-elected at the start of the 2000 session. When he retired from the Mississippi House of Representatives in December 2003, he was the longest-serving member in continuous House service. He was succeeded in office by his son, Bryant Clark.

In 2004, Clark became the first African American to have a Mississippi state building named after him. As a legislator, Clark was known as a statesman, able to work with all colleagues.
