= J.J. McClain High School =

J. J. McClain High School

Location
- 9749 Brozville Road; Lexington, Mississippi 39095; United States
- Coordinates: 33.10467°N 90.05709°W

Information
- School type: Public
- Motto: Striving For Excellence
- Founded: 1959
- Status: Campus merged into and taken over by Holmes County Central High School
- School district: Holmes County School District
- Superintendent: Powell Rucker
- Principal: Sherrod Miller
- Grades: 6–12
- Enrollment: 850
- Average class size: 25
- Colors: Purple, Gold, White
- Slogan: Preparing Students To Leave Holmes college Ready
- Song: Ode To McClain
- Fight song: Mustang Spirit
- Sports: Track and Field, Football, Basketball.
- Mascot: Mustang
- Team name: Mustangs
- Newspaper: Mustang Inquirer
- Website: web.archive.org/*/http://holmes.k12.ms.us/jjmclain/jjmcclainhomepage.html

Jacob Joshua McClain High School was a junior and senior high school in unincorporated Holmes County, Mississippi, United States, about .25 miles (0.40 km) south of Lexington. It is operated by the Holmes County School District. Its campus is presently used by Holmes County Central High School.

As of circa 2006 it had 842 students. It was named after one of its former principals.

== History ==
Originally named the Lexington Attendance Center, it opened in 1959. It was, at the time, an all-black school. It was renamed in 1985.

In 2015 the high school sectors of McClain, S.V. Marshall High School, and Williams-Sullivan High School consolidated into Holmes County Central High School.

== Enrollment statistics ==
- Students & Faculty
- Total Students 877 students
- % Male / % Female 53% / 47%
- Total Classroom Teachers 40 teachers
- Students by Grade Grade 6 - 123 students
- Grade 7 - 138 students
- Grade 8 - 136 students
- Grade 9 - 155 students
- Grade 10 - 117 students
- Grade 11 - 101 students
- Grade 12 - 93 students
- Grade Not Listed - 14 students
