= Mississippi State University Libraries =

Coordinates: 33.453385°N 88.787814°W

Mitchell Memorial Library

The Mississippi State University Libraries are a part of Mississippi State University. Mississippi State University Libraries house over 2,053,064 volumes and a journal collection of 18,103 titles, including 6,148 electronic subscriptions. Also, an array of other resources is made available online.

The Central Branch of Mississippi State Libraries is Mitchell Memorial Library.

== Branches ==
There are four other Branch Libraries of Mississippi State Libraries which include:

=== Architecture Branch ===
Although primarily serving students and faculty of the College Of Architecture, Art and Design, the library welcomes the public and offers information on related subjects such as city planning, art, construction, landscape architecture, and interior design. Library faculty and staff assist patrons and provide guidance to all library resources on the MSU campus.

=== College of Veterinary Medicine ===
The CVM Library services and programs are designed to meet the teaching, research, and clinical needs of the College of Veterinary Medicine. The library faculty/staff also serve the information needs of practicing veterinarians, the general MSU community and any members of the general public with an interest in animal health.

=== Meridian Campus Library ===
The Meridian Campus Library provides access to a wide variety of electronic resources. The students and faculty of the Mississippi State University Meridian Campus also have access to the same print and electronic resources and services as Mississippi State University-Starkville Campus users and, through a partnership between the MSU Libraries and Meridian Community College, may also use the services of the L. O. Todd Library Resource Center.

=== School of Architecture - Jackson Center Library ===
Located at 509 East Capitol Street, Jackson, Mississippi, the Jackson Architecture Center serves students and faculty of the College of Architecture, fifth year program, as well as practicing architects, state legislators and any members of the general public with an interest in architecture. The library offers information on related subjects such as city planning, art, construction, landscape architecture, and interior design. Library faculty assists patrons and provide guidance to all library resources housed locally and on the Starkville campus.

== See also ==
- Mississippi State University
- Library
- Academic library
- Meridian, Mississippi
- Jackson, Mississippi
