= Holmes County Consolidated School District =

School district in Mississippi

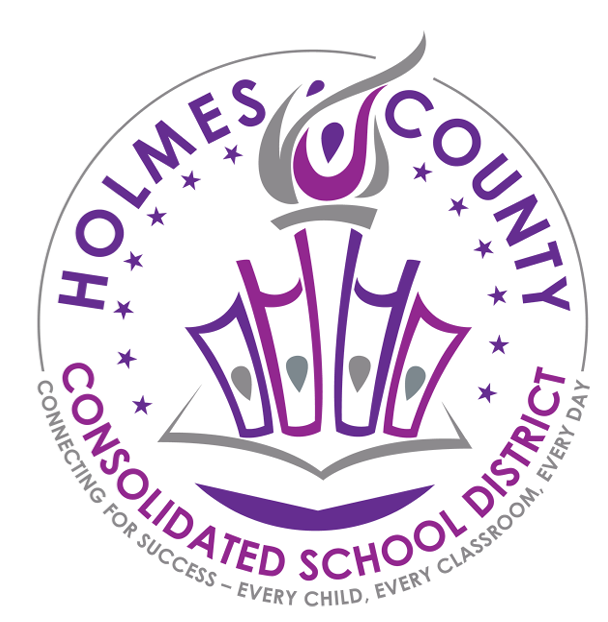

Address
- 313 Olive Street Lexington, Mississippi, 39095; United States

District information
- Type: Public
- Grades: PreK–12
- NCES District ID: 2800195

Students and staff
- Students: 2,641
- Teachers: 190.17 (FTE)
- Staff: 224.56 (FTE)
- Student–teacher ratio: 13.89

Other information
- Website: www.holmesccsd.org

The Holmes County Consolidated School District (HCCSD), formerly the Holmes County School District, is a public school district based in Lexington, Mississippi (USA). The district covers all of Holmes County, including the City of Durant area previously served by the Durant Public School District. Effective July 1, 2018 the Holmes County and Durant school districts consolidated into the Holmes County Consolidated School District.

As of 2016 the district had a per student spending rate, adjusted for regional cost differentiation, of $8,368, $3,500 under the U.S. average. The district received, for every student, $1,500 as per Title I. Its student body is among the poorest in the United States.

== Schools ==
High school:

- Holmes County Central High School (Grades 9–12; Unincorporated area)
  - Doretha Draine Wiley Fine Arts Magnet Academy

PreK-8:

- William R. Dean, Jr. Elementary School (Grades preK-5; Unincorporated area)
- Durant Elementary School (Grades preK-5; Durant)
- Goodman-Pickens Elementary School (Grades preK-5; Unincorporated area)
  - It is between Goodman and Pickens. In 2006 it had about 379 students.
- S.V. Marshall Elementary School (Grades preK-8; Unincorporated area)
- Williams-Sullivan Middle School (Grades 6-8; Unincorporated area)

Other:

- Graduates Within Reach Academy (Tchula)
- Career-Technical Center (Lexington)

Former schools:

- S.V. Marshall High School (Grades K-5, 9–12, Unincorporated area)
- J.J. McClain High School (Grades 6–12, Unincorporated area)
- Williams-Sullivan High School (Grades PK-12, Unincorporated area)
- Mileston Middle School (Grades 6–8; Mileston, unincorporated area)
  - Previously Mileston Elementary School (K-6), it housed up to 130 students.
- Lexington Elementary School (Grades K-5, Lexington)
  - In 2006, it had 669 students.

== Demographics ==
=== 2006-07 school year ===
There were a total of 3,508 students enrolled in the Holmes County School District during the 2006–2007 school year. The gender makeup of the district was 50% female and 50% male. The racial makeup of the district was 99.86% African American, 0.06% White, and 0.09% Asian. 93.2% of the district's students were eligible to receive free lunch.

=== Previous school years ===
In 1968 there were 771 white students in the county school system. Desegregation occurred in 1969, and that year the white student population decreased to 228. In 1970 no white students were enrolled.

School Year	Enrollment	Gender Makeup		Racial Makeup				
School Year	Enrollment	Female	Male	Asian	African American	Hispanic	Native American	White
2005-06	3,479	50%	50%	0.03%	99.98%	0.09%	–	0.06%
2004-05	3,557	50%	50%	0.11%	99.63%	0.06%	–	0.20%
2003-04	3,557	50%	50%	0.03%	99.86%	0.06%	–	0.06%
2002-03	3,653	50%	50%	0.03%	99.95%	0.03%	–	–

== Accountability statistics ==
	2006-07	2005-06	2004-05	2003-04	2002-03
District Accreditation Status	Probation	Probation	Advised	Accredited	Accredited
School Performance Classifications
Level 5 (Superior Performing) Schools	0	0	0	0	0
Level 4 (Exemplary) Schools	0	0	1	2	0
Level 3 (Successful) Schools	3	2	1	2	5
Level 2 (Under Performing) Schools	1	4	3	2	1
Level 1 (Low Performing) Schools	3	0	1	0	0
Not Assigned	0	0	0	0	0

== See also ==
- Alexander v. Holmes County Board of Education
- List of school districts in Mississippi
