= James A. Robertson Jr. =

American politician

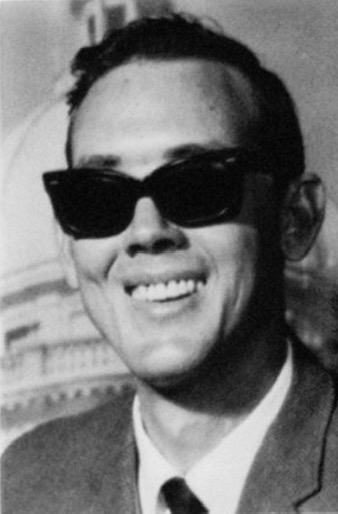

Member of the Mississippi House of Representatives
- In office 1968–1972

Personal details
- Born: December 8, 1939 (age 86) Centreville, Mississippi, U.S.

James A. Robertson Jr. (born December 8, 1939) is an American politician. He served as a member of the Mississippi House of Representatives.

== Life and career ==
Robertson was born in Centreville, Mississippi. At the age of 20, he became blind after sustaining injuries in an automobile accident.

Robertson was an instructor at the University of Southern Mississippi.

Robertson served in the Mississippi House of Representatives from 1968 to 1972.
