= Central Holmes Christian School =

Segregation academy in Mississippi

Location
- Lexington, Mississippi; 33.1152851°N 90.0415682°W

Information
- Established: 1967
- Faculty: 14.3
- Grades: Pre-Kindergarten-12
- Enrollment: 265
- Campus type: Remote rural
- Colors: Red, White and Blue
- Team name: Trojans
- Website: www.chcstrojans.com

Central Holmes Christian School (CHCS), previously Central Holmes Academy, is a private non-sectarian Christian school in Lexington, Mississippi. It includes elementary, middle, and high school grades 1-12. The school has a controversial history as a segregation academy.

== History ==
In the late 1960s, public schools in Holmes County, Mississippi and across the state were being racially integrated. The majority of the county population was black, as in many parts of the Delta. Many white parents withdrew their children from the public system and began sending them to Central Holmes, a newly established private school. James Charles Cobb wrote that Central Holmes Academy had been "hastily constructed" as a segregation academy. The Wall Street Journal reported that the school was established by a chapter of the White Citizens' Council. A group of young men enrolled in a vocational program funded by the federal government of the United States used their training to establish the school.

On its establishment, almost every white child in Lexington was enrolled in Central Holmes Christian Academy to avoid having them attend school with black children. But across the state as a whole, only a very small minority of white students were withdrawn to attend private schools; most stayed in public schools. In 2016, Central Holmes Christian School had 265 students enrolled. Of these, thirty-one (14%) were nonwhite, while about 70% of the population of the town of Lexington was black.

== Alumni ==
Melany Neilson - author
