= Lexington Historic District (Lexington, Mississippi) =

Historic district in Mississippi, United States

- U.S. National Register of Historic Places
- U.S. Historic district
- Location within Mississippi Location within the United States
- Location: Roughly Courthouse Sq., along Yazoo, Vine, Tchula, Boulevard, Springs, Race Sts., and Old Tchula Rd., Lexington, Mississippi
- Coordinates: 33°6′53″N 90°2′59″W
- Built: 1833
- Architectural style: Greek Revival, Italianate, etc.
- NRHP reference No.: 01000754
- Added to NRHP: July 19, 2001

Lexington Historic District in Lexington, Mississippi is a historic district that was listed on the National Register of Historic Places in 2001.

It included 225 contributing buildings, a Confederate monument, the brick streets of the district (considered to be a separate resource), and 94 non-contributing buildings. Three resources were already listed on the National Register as the Holmes County Courthouse.
