= Holmes Community College =

Community college in Goodman, Mississippi, U.S.

- Type: Public community college
- Established: 1911
- Head: Jim Haffey
- Location: Goodman, Mississippi, United States; 32°58′10″N 89°54′59″W
- Mascot: Bulldog
- Website: http://www.holmescc.edu/

Holmes Community College is a public community college with its main campus in Goodman, Mississippi. It also has campuses in Grenada and Ridgeland, and satellite campuses in Attala, Webster, and Yazoo Counties.

Holmes Community College serves Attala, Carroll, Choctaw, Grenada, Holmes, Madison, Montgomery, Webster, and Yazoo Counties.

Holmes Community College was established in 1911, when plans were made to found Holmes County Agricultural High School in Goodman, Mississippi. The town of Goodman provided 40 acres (160,000 m^{2}) of land (along with free water from the community's artesian well) on the west side of town, and the Board of Trustees purchased an additional 42 acres (170,000 m^{2}) adjacent to the original school location. The mascot of Holmes Community College is the bulldog.

It was previously Holmes Junior College.

== History ==
Holmes Community College originally began as Holmes County Agricultural High School, established in 1911 when the town of Goodman provided 40 acres of land and the college's board of trustees bought 42 acres of land on the west side of Goodman, Mississippi. In 1922, the Mississippi Legislature made it legal for agricultural high schools to add two years of college work. Holmes added the first year of college work in the 1925-1926 school session, and a sophomore year of college work in the 1928-1929 school session.

== Admissions ==
To be considered for admission, applicants must submit a high school transcript or equivalent. In the 2024-2025 school year, tuition for in-state residents was $3,510 a year, while tuition for out-of-state residents was $6,210 a year. About 72% of students were awarded financial aid in the 2023-2024 school year. In the fall 2024 semester, 5,039 students were attending part- or full-time.

== Academics ==
The college's focus is to provide education and credits to students seeking to transfer to a four-year college and to provide students with technical experience for the workforce.

The college offers a variety of academic and technical pathways:

- Arts
- Business
- Education
- Health sciences
- Industrial studies
- Kinesiology
- Professional studies
- Social science
- Science, technology, engineering, and mathematics

In addition to the college's main academic program, dual enrollment courses are offered at high schools throughout Mississippi. Once completed, the credits can be transferred to Holmes Community College or another college that recognizes the credits.

== Campuses ==
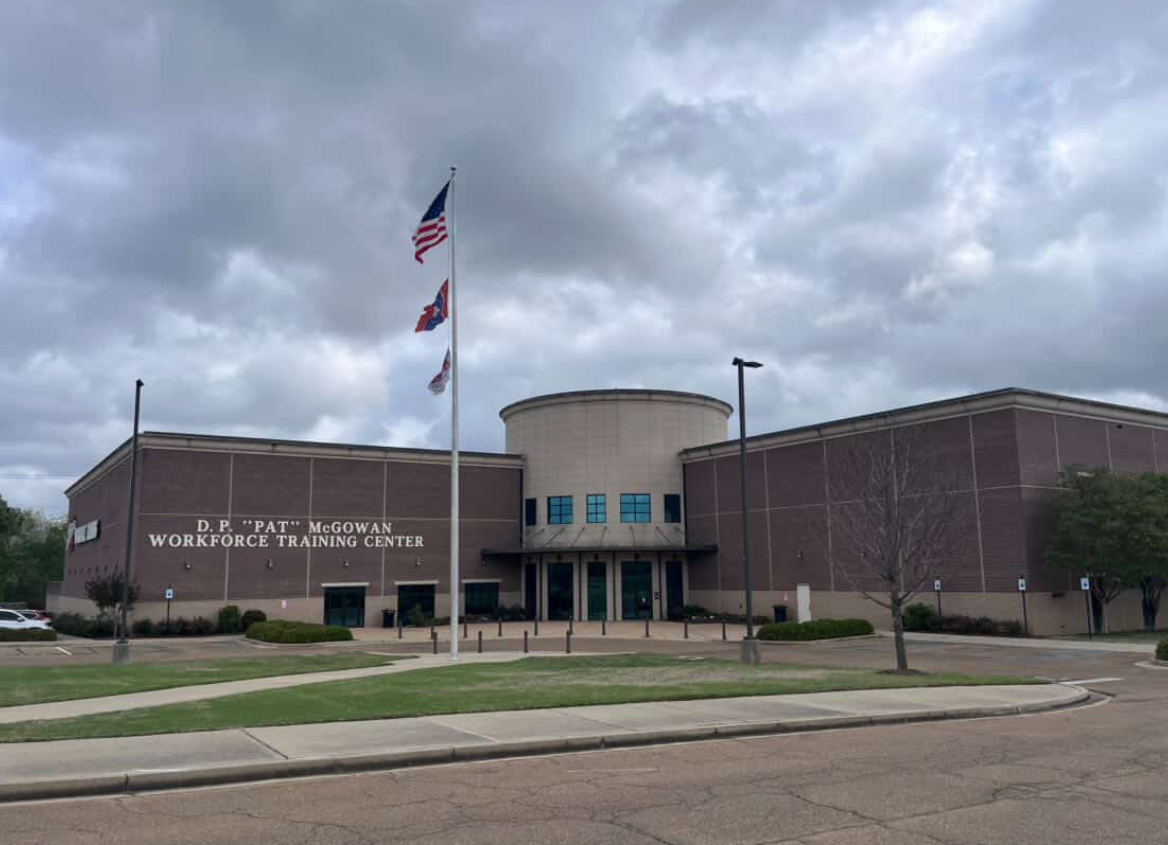
Ridgeland Campus Pat McGowan Workforce Training Center

Holmes Community College currently operates across 5 campuses:

- Goodman Campus, Goodman
- Grenada Center, Grenada
- Ridgeland Campus, Ridgeland
- Kosciusko - Attala Educational Center / Workforce Development, Kosciusko
- Yazoo Center, Yazoo City

The Goodman campus currently has 43 notable buildings, including stadia, sports fields, lecture halls, and residences. The college opened with three buildings. The first gymnasium was built in 1928, the football stadium in 1936, and coliseum in 1974. A new building to expand medical and nursing programs is expected to be completed in 2027.

== Athletics ==
The college participates in the National Junior College Athletic Association athletics program.

Holmes Community College NJCAA Football History 2012-2024
| Season | Rank | Wins | Losses | Points per game |
|---|---|---|---|---|
| 2023-2024 | 31 | 6 | 3 | 34.1 |
| 2022-2023 | 27 | 5 | 4 | 29.6 |
| 2021-2022 | 25 | 0 | 5 | 11.2 |
| 2020-2021 | 25 | 0 | 5 | 11.2 |
| 2019-2020 | 32 | 4 | 5 | 28.6 |
| 2018-2019 | 38 | 5 | 4 | 25.1 |
| 2017-2018 | 37 | 6 | 3 | 32.6 |
| 2016-2017 | 10 | 7 | 3 | 37.1 |
| 2015-2016 | 37 | 4 | 5 | 32.6 |
| 2014-2015 | 39 | 4 | 5 | 21.4 |
| 2013-2014 | 39 | 3 | 6 | 20.1 |
| 2012-2013 | 55 | 5 | 4 | 22.0 |

== Notable alumni ==
- Max Dale Cooper, immunologist
- Walter Jones, professional football player
- Daryl Macon (born 1995), professional basketball player
- Alvin McKinley (born 1978), professional football player
- Roy Oswalt (born 1977), professional baseball player
- Trumaine Sykes (born 1982), professional football player
