= John R. Junkin =

American politician (1896–1975)

John Junkin
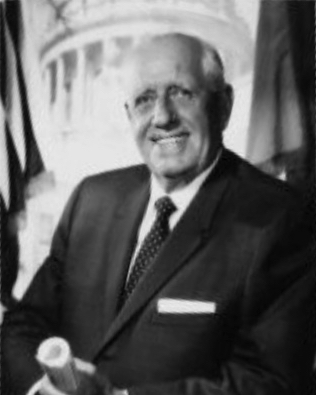
- Official portrait, 1968

57th Speaker of the Mississippi House of Representatives
- In office November 9, 1966 – October 12, 1975
- Preceded by: Walter Sillers Jr.
- Succeeded by: Buddie Newman

Member of the Mississippi House of Representatives from Adams County
- In office January 4, 1944 – October 12, 1975
- Preceded by: Thomas J. Reed
- Succeeded by: Thomas J. O'Beirne

Personal details
- Born: John Richard Junkin; December 16, 1896 Natchez, Mississippi, U.S.
- Died: October 12, 1975 (aged 78) Natchez, Mississippi, U.S.
- Party: Democratic
- Spouse: Sophie Dix

Military service
- Branch/service: United States Army
- Rank: Sergeant
- Battles/wars: World War I

John Richard Junkin (December 16, 1896 – October 12, 1975) was an American politician who served as Speaker of the Mississippi House of Representatives from 1966 until his death from cancer in 1975. He was previously chairman of the House appropriations committee. His grandson is songwriter and record producer Glen Ballard.

Mississippi House of Representatives
Preceded by Walter Sillers Jr.	Speaker of the Mississippi House of Representatives; 1966–1975	Succeeded by Buddie Newman
