= Holmes County Central High School =

Location
- 9749 Brozville Road; Lexington, Mississippi 39095; United States
- 33.1047°N 90.0571°W

Information
- School type: Public
- Founded: 2015
- School district: Holmes County School District
- Teaching staff: 52.64 (FTE)
- Grades: 9–12
- Enrollment: 811 (2022-2023)
- Student to teacher ratio: 15.41
- Colors: Red and gold
- Team name: Jaguars
- Website: www.holmesccsd.org

Holmes County Central High School is a senior high school in unincorporated Holmes County, Mississippi, United States, about 0.25 miles (0.40 km) south of Lexington. A part of the Holmes County School District, it occupies the former J.J. McClain High School. The mascot is the jaguar, and it serves grades 9–12.

As of 2015 the school had about 760 students, 99% of them African-American.

== History ==
It opened in 2015 and was the consolidation of the high school sectors of Jacob Joshua McClain High School, S.V. Marshall High School, and Williams-Sullivan High School. The school district attempted to pass a bond to build a consolidated high school in August 2013, but it was voted down.

Stanford University Graduate School of Education Center to Support Excellence in Teaching (CSET) stated that "Despite concerns by some in the community, the merging of the high schools has been a success."

In March 2018 the newly elected Holmes County school board voted to move high school students in Durant High School to Holmes County Central High, an action opposed by area residents. Due to the consolidation, the district again sought a new building for its consolidated high school. As of 2017 it is considering acquiring a former factory, which would only need $20 million to be renovated into a high school.

== Academic performance ==
In 2015 about 66% of incoming 9th graders had reading scores below their intended grade levels.
