= Lexington, Mississippi =

- City
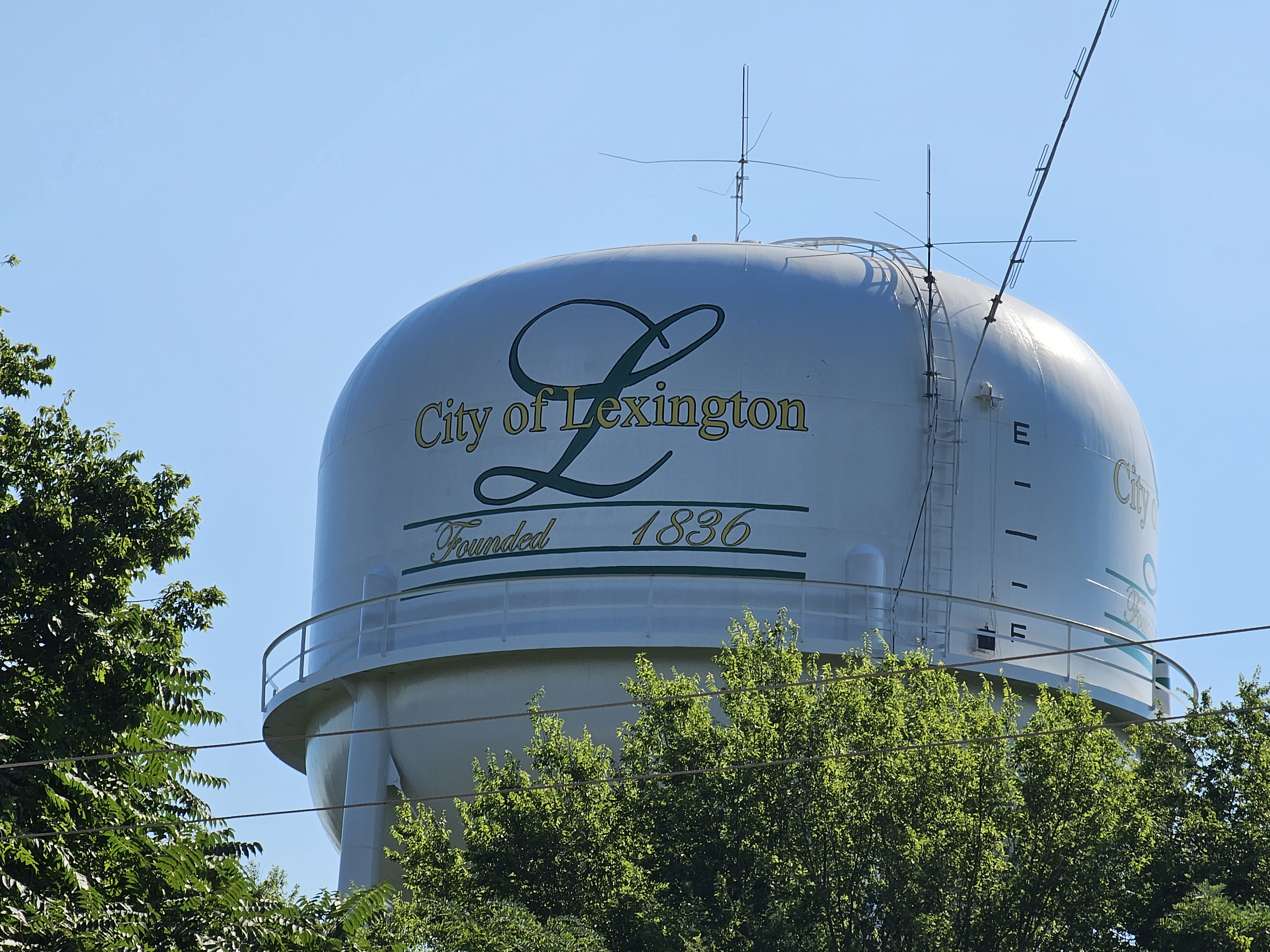
- Water Tower in Lexington

- Flag

- Location of Lexington, Mississippi

- Location in the United States
- Coordinates: 33°6′52″N 90°3′4″W
- Country: United States
- State: Mississippi
- County: Holmes

Government
  - Mayor: Percy L. Washington

Area
  - Total: 2.42 sq mi (6.27 km^{2})
  - Land: 2.42 sq mi (6.26 km^{2})
  - Water: 0.0039 sq mi (0.01 km^{2})
- Elevation: 233 ft (71 m)

Population (2020)
  - Total: 1,602
  - Density: 662.7/sq mi (255.86/km^{2})
- Time zone: UTC-6 (Central (CST))
  - Summer (DST): UTC-5 (CDT)
- ZIP code: 39095
- Area code: 662
- FIPS code: 28-40600
- GNIS feature ID: 0672434

Lexington is a city in and the county seat of Holmes County, Mississippi, United States. The county was organized in 1833 and the city in 1836. As of the 2020 census, Lexington had a population of 1,602. It has declined from its high of 3,198 in 1950 due to the expansion of industrial-scale agriculture.

== History ==
Incorporated in 1836, the city was founded by European-American settlers after most of the Choctaw people, who had long occupied this area, were forced to cede their land to the United States and remove to the Indian Territory. The new settlers initially developed riverfront land along the Yazoo and Black rivers for cotton plantations, primarily worked by enslaved African Americans. The enslaved people were brought by planters with them from the Upper South or transported in the domestic slave trade. In total, more than one million African Americans were transported to the Deep South, breaking up many families. The African-descended enslaved people soon constituted the majority of the Holmes County population.

On court days, the town served as a trading center for the county and attracted retail merchants. Lexington was a destination in the 1840s of some German-Jewish immigrants, who often became merchants. They were joined much later in the century by Russian Jewish immigrants. The Jewish community built Temple Beth El in Lexington in 1905; it closed in 2009 because of declining population. During the plantation era, the city was bustling, as planters grew wealthy from the booming demand for cotton in the North and Europe.

Among the early settlers in the 1840s was German-Jewish immigrant Jacob Sontheimer, who first worked caring for an elderly planter. After being bequeathed land, Sontheimer later became a merchant in town. His two daughters, Rose and Bettie, also became merchants, managing the Sontheimer business. He was joined by other Jewish immigrants from Germany, totaling about 20 by the late 1870s and 50 by 1900. In the later years Jewish immigrants also came from eastern Europe to Lexington. They developed tailoring and grocery businesses; the Lewis Grocery Store developed into a major wholesaler in the state.

After the Civil War, freedmen in Holmes County, who constituted the majority of the population, joined the Republican Party and elected several county sheriffs and other local officers. They sought education and some became landowners, clearing land in the bottomlands and selling their timber to raise money for purchase. This progress was before 1890, when they were essentially deprived of the vote by the state legislature passing a new constitution, which created barriers to voter registration and forced them out of politics for decades into the late 20th century. In the late 19th and early 20th centuries, financial recession and lack of political clout meant that many freedmen lost their land; within a generation they had regressed to the status of sharecropper and tenant farmer.

=== 20th century to present ===
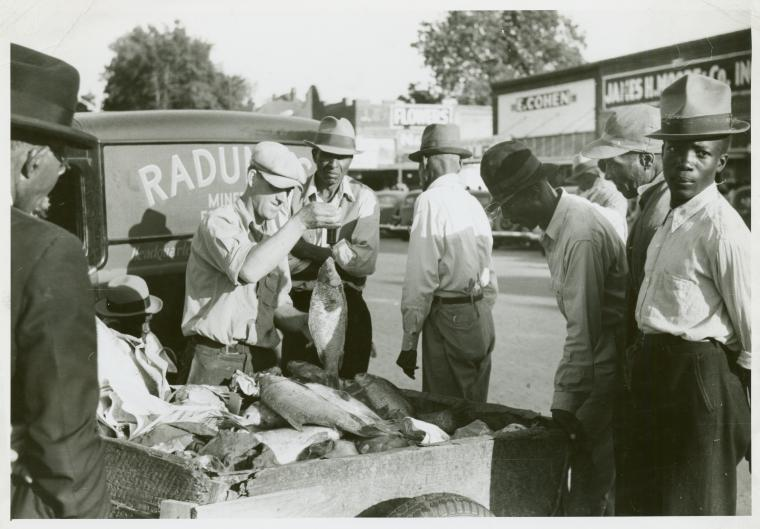
Selling fish on Saturday afternoon in Lexington, 1939. Photo by Marion Post Wolcott.

Edmund F. Noel, an attorney in Lexington, was a son of planters Leland and Margaret Noel, from Virginia and North Carolina, respectively. His father had developed cotton plantations in Holmes County in the antebellum period. The younger Noel became a politician, elected as a state legislator and later as district attorney. In 1906 he was elected as governor of Mississippi, serving through 1912. His house at North Street is listed on the National Register of Historic Places for its distinctive architecture, and is known as the "Gov. Edmond F. Noel House." It was bequeathed to him by his mother.

In the early 20th century, Mississippi planters recruited Chinese immigrant workers to satisfy the demand for farm labor, and some came to Holmes County. As the area suffered from the boll weevil infestation, the cotton crops suffered. Agricultural mechanization reduced the need for farm labor, leading to a decline in county and town populations from the 1930s on. Many African Americans fled the South for northern and midwestern industrial cities, seeking more opportunities and escape from the violence of lynchings and oppression of Jim Crow rules.

In the 1940s, two lynchings of black men took place in or near Lexington: singer B.B. King later recounted having seen a youth hanged in the courthouse square during the short time he was living there as a teenager, about 1942–1944. The body of 35-year-old Leon McTatie was found on 24 July 1946 in a bayou in nearby Sunflower County. He was beaten to death for allegedly stealing a saddle. Six white men were charged in his lynching but quickly acquitted at trial.

Lexington was distinguished by two nationally known women: Arenia Mallory, an African-American music teacher from Illinois, started teaching at the newly established Saints Academy in Lexington in 1926, which was affiliated with the Church of God in Christ. She led the school for more than 50 years, expanding its programs to grades 1–12, and establishing a junior college. She developed the school from the early 20th century as a model of academic excellence for African-American students. During her long tenure, she also founded an associated junior college. During the 1960s, she was appointed by President John F. Kennedy to national positions and committees in the federal government.

Hazel Brannon Smith, a white woman from an upper-class family, was based in Lexington, where she owned and published several rural newspapers. She promoted integration and change in the region during the civil rights era, winning a Pulitzer Prize for her editorials in 1964, the year of Freedom Summer and the Mississippi Freedom Democratic Party, organized by African Americans before the Voting Rights Act of 1965 was passed by Congress.

In September 2024, the US Department of Justice (DOJ) concluded an investigation into the City of Lexington, and the Lexington Police Department. The investigation revealed a pattern of misconduct, including excessive force, discriminatory arrests, and a reliance on fines and fees that disproportionately burden Black residents and those struggling financially, with the DOJ concluding that the Lexington Police Department had "created a system where officers can relentlessly violate the law." The DOJ's findings led to a series of recommendations aimed at reforming the police department and improving its practices.

== Geography ==
Lexington is in the center of Holmes County on the north side of the valley of Black Creek, a west-flowing tributary of the Yazoo River. Mississippi Highways 12 and 17 pass through the city, sharing four blocks of Carrollton Street north of the city center. Highway 12 leads east 13 miles (21 km) to Durant and northwest 11 miles (18 km) to Tchula, while Highway 17 leads north 30 miles (48 km) to Carrollton and south 18 miles (29 km) to Pickens.

According to the United States Census Bureau, the city has a total area of 2.4 square miles (6.3 km^{2}), of which 9,785 square metres (2.4 acres), or 0.16%, are water.

=== Climate ===
The climate in this area is characterized by hot, humid summers and generally mild to cool winters. According to the Köppen Climate Classification system, Lexington has a humid subtropical climate, in common with the vast majority of the American South.

== Demographics ==
The table to the right shows two periods of dramatic population declines: from 1910 to 1920, and in the decades after 1950. The latter in particular was a period of mechanization of agriculture and consolidation of land into large, industrial holdings. Many African Americans left the area during both phases of the Great Migration, particularly before passage of civil rights legislation, for better jobs elsewhere and to escape Jim Crow.

Historical population
Census	Pop.	Note	%±
1850	656		—
1860	887		35.2%
1870	744		−16.1%
1880	798		7.3%
1890	1,075		34.7%
1900	1,516		41.0%
1910	2,428		60.2%
1920	1,792		−26.2%
1930	2,590		44.5%
1940	2,930		13.1%
1950	3,198		9.1%
1960	2,839		−11.2%
1970	2,756		−2.9%
1980	2,628		−4.6%
1990	2,227		−15.3%
2000	2,025		−9.1%
2010	1,731		−14.5%
2020	1,602		−7.5%
U.S. Decennial Census

=== Racial and ethnic composition ===
Lexington city, Mississippi – Racial and ethnic composition Note: the US Census treats Hispanic/Latino as an ethnic category. This table excludes Latinos from the racial categories and assigns them to a separate category. Hispanics/Latinos may be of any race.
Race / Ethnicity (NH = Non-Hispanic)	Pop 2000	Pop 2010	Pop 2020	% 2000	% 2010	% 2020
White alone (NH)	628	466	281	31.01%	26.92%	17.54%
Black or African American alone (NH)	1,329	1,228	1,278	65.63%	70.94%	79.78%
Native American or Alaska Native alone (NH)	1	2	0	0.05%	0.12%	0.00%
Asian alone (NH)	13	9	9	0.64%	0.52%	0.56%
Native Hawaiian or Pacific Islander alone (NH)	0	0	0	0.00%	0.00%	0.00%
Other race alone (NH)	0	0	4	0.00%	0.00%	0.25%
Mixed race or Multiracial (NH)	14	9	29	0.69%	0.52%	1.81%
Hispanic or Latino (any race)	40	17	1	1.98%	0.98%	0.06%
Total	2,025	1,731	1,602	100.00%	100.00%	100.00%

=== 2020 census ===
As of the 2020 census, Lexington had a population of 1,602. The median age was 40.6 years. 23.1% of residents were under the age of 18 and 17.5% of residents were 65 years of age or older. For every 100 females there were 89.6 males, and for every 100 females age 18 and over there were 83.9 males age 18 and over.

0.0% of residents lived in urban areas, while 100.0% lived in rural areas.

There were 642 households in Lexington, of which 31.8% had children under the age of 18 living in them. Of all households, 25.2% were married-couple households, 23.1% were households with a male householder and no spouse or partner present, and 45.8% were households with a female householder and no spouse or partner present. About 33.6% of all households were made up of individuals and 15.1% had someone living alone who was 65 years of age or older.

There were 757 housing units, of which 15.2% were vacant. The homeowner vacancy rate was 2.1% and the rental vacancy rate was 7.1%.

Racial composition as of the 2020 census
Race	Number	Percent
White	282	17.6%
Black or African American	1,278	79.8%
American Indian and Alaska Native	0	0.0%
Asian	9	0.6%
Native Hawaiian and Other Pacific Islander	0	0.0%
Some other race	4	0.2%
Two or more races	29	1.8%

=== 2010 census ===
As of the 2010 Census, the racial composition of the city was:

- 71.8% Black or African American;
- 27.0% White
- 0.06% from other races;
- 0.5% Asian;
- 0.5% from two or more races;
- 0.1% American Indian;
- 0.0% Pacific Islander.

=== 2000 census ===
As of the census of 2000, there were 2,025 people, 725 households, and 503 families residing in the city. The population density was 825.6 inhabitants per square mile (318.8/km^{2}). There were 802 housing units at an average density of 327.0 per square mile (126.3/km^{2}). The racial makeup of the city was 31.36% White, 67.26% African American, 0.05% Native American, 0.64% Asian, and 0.69% from two or more races. Hispanic or Latino of any race were 1.98% of the population.

There were 725 households, out of which 30.3% had children under the age of 18 living with them, 37.8% were married couples living together, 26.3% had a female householder with no husband present, and 30.5% were non-families. 28.8% of all households were made up of individuals, and 15.4% had someone living alone who was 65 years of age or older. The average household size was 2.70 and the average family size was 3.34.

In the city, the population was spread out, with 28.5% under the age of 18, 11.1% from 18 to 24, 26.9% from 25 to 44, 17.9% from 45 to 64, and 15.7% who were 65 years of age or older. The median age was 35 years. For every 100 females, there were 91.0 males. For every 100 females age 18 and over, there were 83.1 males.

The median income for a household in the city was $22,163, and the median income for a family was $29,732. Males had a median income of $25,750 versus $17,328 for females. The per capita income for the city was $14,614. About 32.7% of families and 37.2% of the population were below the poverty line, including 54.5% of those under age 18 and 28.4% of those age 65 or over.

== Education ==
The city of Lexington is served by the Holmes County School District. William Dean Jr. Elementary School and Holmes County Central High School (in the former J. J. McClain High School) are located in the area. The community previously also housed Lexington Elementary School.

Lexington was previously home to Saints Industrial and Literary School, later known as Saints Academy. Founded in 1918, this private school for African-American students was established by the Church of God in Christ. Arenia Mallory, from Illinois, began as a music teacher and became principal and president of the school. She led its growth and the setting of high academic standards to provide opportunities to black students; the school had a national reputation. The school was expanded as Saints Academy and Junior College, and Saints College.

Another private school in the city, Central Holmes Christian School (formerly Central Holmes Academy), was established in 1967 as a segregation academy.

== Notable people ==
- Chalmers Archer, author, academic and U.S. Special Forces veteran
- John C. Black, member of the United States House of Representatives from 1893 to 1895 and Medal of Honor recipient
- Lee Cooper, blues guitarist
- Minnie M. Cox, postmaster and teacher
- Leonard B. Cresswell, major general in the United States Marine Corps and recipient of the Navy Cross
- Buford Ellington, Governor of Tennessee from 1959 to 1963 and 1967 to 1971
- Malachi Favors, jazz bassist
- B.B. King, musician, lived in Lexington
- Ronald Kirklin, Quartermaster General and Commandant of the Quartermaster School at Fort Lee, Virginia from 2014 to 2016
- John R. Land, Louisiana Supreme Court Justice from 1921 to 1941
- Alexander Lane (1857–1911), Illinois state representative and physician, born in Lexington
- Arenia Mallory, African-American educator and activist, principal of the Saints Academy and founder of its junior college
- Charles Harrison Mason, founder of the Church of God in Christ, an evangelical church which grew to have a national presence
- Melany Neilson, author
- William Nichols, architect
- Edmond Favor Noel, attorney, Governor of Mississippi 1908–1912; son of Leland Noel, an early planter in Holmes County who migrated from Virginia and became one of the largest slaveholders before the Civil War
- Milton L. Olive III, (1946–1965) United States Army Soldier and recipient of the Medal of Honor
- Lonnie Pitchford, blues musician born in Lexington
- Monroe Saffold Jr., American bodybuilder, first place Masters Mr. America AAU, tall division 1990
- Hazel Brannon Smith (1914–1994), owner and publisher of the Lexington Advertiser and other local newspapers; first woman to win the Pulitzer Prize for Editorial Writing
- Otis "Big Smokey" Smothers, Chicago blues guitarist
- Neely Tucker, journalist, author
- Willie West, former National Football League defensive back
- Rassie Hoskins White, President General of the United Daughters of the Confederacy
- Hattie Winston, actress in television, film and theatre

== See also ==
- Lexington Historic District
