= Jackson metropolitan area, Mississippi =

Jackson Metropolitan Area
- Metropolitan Statistical Area
- Jackson, MS Metropolitan Statistical Area
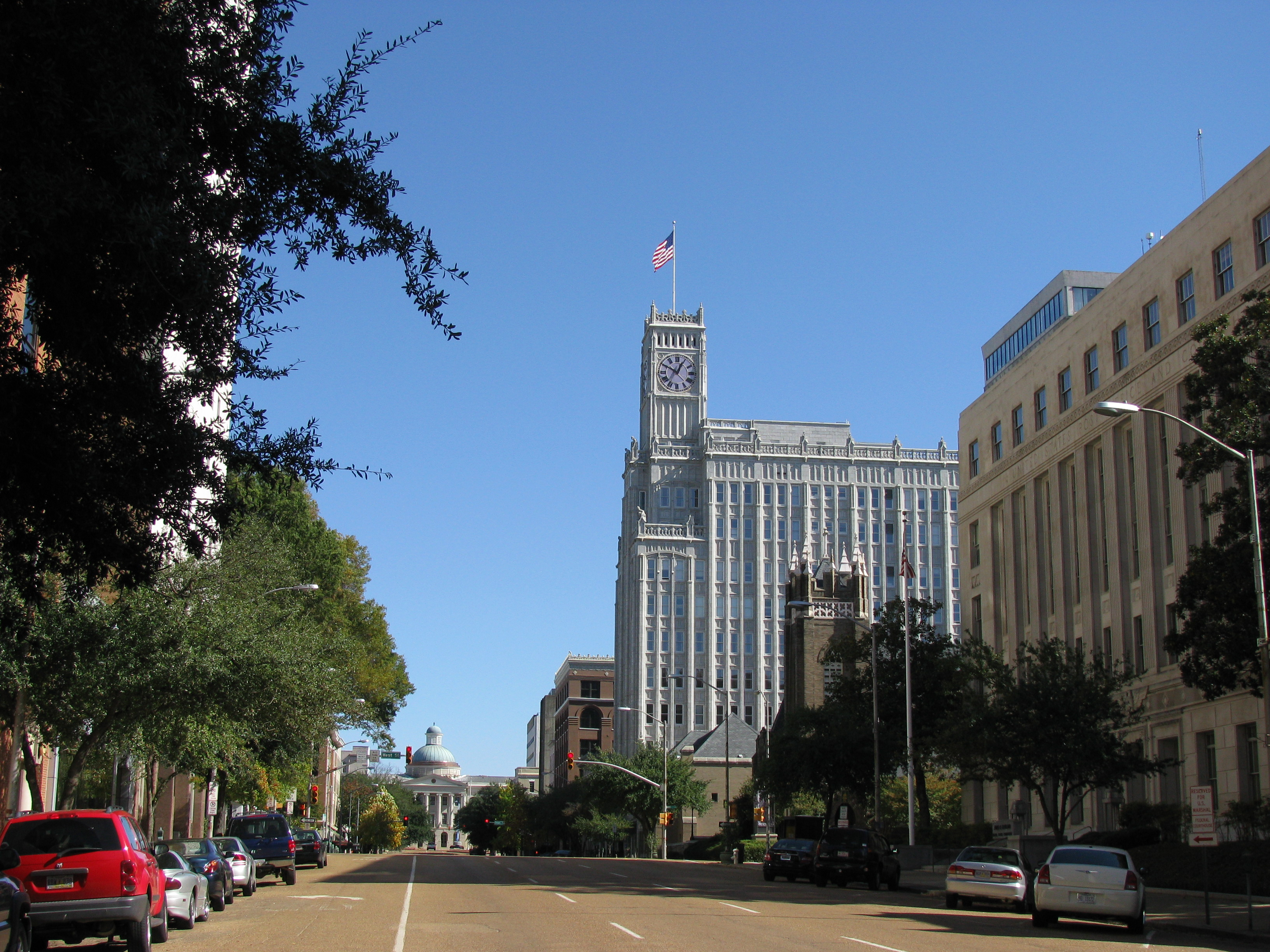
- Capitol Street in Jackson
Map of Jackson–Vicksburg–Brookhaven, MS CSA
City of Jackson
Jackson, MS MSA
City of Vicksburg
Vicksburg, MS µSA
City of Brookhaven
Brookhaven, MS µSA
- Country: United States
- State: Mississippi
- Largest city: Jackson (153,701)
- Other cities: Clinton (28,100); Madison (27,747); Pearl (27,115); Brandon (25,138); Ridgeland (24,340); Flowood (10,202); Vicksburg (20,391); Brookhaven (11,674); Yazoo City (10,316)

Population (2020)
  - Total: 597,727
  - Density: 5/sq mi (1.9/km^{2})

GDP
  - Total: $37.054 billion (2023)
  - Per capita: $61,992 (2023)
- Time zone: UTC-6 (CST)
  - Summer (DST): UTC-5 (CDT)

The Jackson metropolitan area, officially the Jackson, MS Metropolitan Statistical Area, is a metropolitan statistical area (MSA) in the central region of the U.S. state of Mississippi that covers eight counties: Copiah, Hinds, Holmes, Madison, Rankin, Simpson, Yazoo and Scott. As of the 2020 census, the Jackson MSA had a population of 619,968. According to 2025 estimates, the population has slightly decreased to 609,847. Jackson is the principal city of the MSA.

== Counties ==
| County | Seat(s) | 2025 estimate | 2020 census | Change | Area | Density |
|---|---|---|---|---|---|---|
| Hinds | Jackson & Raymond | 211,888 | 227,742 | −6.96% | 877 sq mi (2,270 km^{2}) | 242/sq mi (93/km^{2}) |
| Rankin | Brandon | 162,181 | 157,031 | +3.28% | 806 sq mi (2,090 km^{2}) | 201/sq mi (78/km^{2}) |
| Madison | Canton | 116,298 | 109,145 | +6.55% | 742 sq mi (1,920 km^{2}) | 157/sq mi (61/km^{2}) |
| Scott | Forest | 28,073 | 27,990 | +0.30% | 610 sq mi (1,600 km^{2}) | 46/sq mi (18/km^{2}) |
| Copiah | Hazlehurst | 27,497 | 28,368 | −3.07% | 779 sq mi (2,020 km^{2}) | 35/sq mi (14/km^{2}) |
| Simpson | Mendenhall | 25,498 | 25,949 | −1.74% | 590 sq mi (1,500 km^{2}) | 43/sq mi (17/km^{2}) |
| Yazoo | Yazoo City | 22,947 | 26,743 | −14.19% | 934 sq mi (2,420 km^{2}) | 25/sq mi (9/km^{2}) |
| Holmes | Lexington | 15,465 | 17,000 | −9.03% | 765 sq mi (1,980 km^{2}) | 20/sq mi (8/km^{2}) |
| Total | | 609,847 | 619,968 | −1.63% | 6,103 sq mi (15,810 km^{2}) | 100/sq mi (39/km^{2}) |

== Communities ==
Places with more than 100,000 inhabitants

• Jackson

° Jackson is the capital of and the most populous city in the State of Mississippi. It is one of the county seats of Hinds County (Raymond being the other). As of the 2020 census, Jackson's population was 153,701.

Places with 25,000-99,999 inhabitants

- Clinton
- Madison
- Pearl
- Brandon

=== Places with 10,000 to 24,999 inhabitants ===
- Brookhaven
- Byram
- Canton
- Flowood
- Ridgeland
- Vicksburg
- Yazoo City

=== Places with 1,000 to 9,999 inhabitants ===
- Crystal Springs
- Durant
- Edwards
- Flora
- Florence
- Gluckstadt
- Goodman
- Hazlehurst
- Lexington
- Magee
- Mendenhall
- Pelahatchie
- Pickens
- Raymond
- Richland
- Tchula
- Wesson

=== Places with fewer than 1,000 inhabitants ===
- Beauregard
- Bentonia
- Bolton
- Braxton
- Cruger
- D'Lo
- Eden
- Georgetown
- Learned
- Puckett
- Satartia
- Star
- Terry
- Utica
- West

=== Unincorporated places ===
- Acona
- Anding
- Benton
- Brownsville
- Brozville
- Camden
- Carpenter
- Carter
- Coxburg
- Dentville
- Ebenezer
- Egypt
- Eulogy
- Fannin
- Franklin
- Gallman
- Good Hope
- Goshen Springs
- Greenfield
- Gulde
- Gwin
- Harrisville
- Holly Bluff
- Hopewell
- Hopewell Landing
- Howard
- Ituma
- Johns
- Langford
- Leesburg
- Little Yazoo
- Marcella
- Martinsville
- Midway
- Mileston
- Montgomery
- Oakley
- Oil City
- Oregon
- Owens Wells
- Piney Woods
- Pinola
- Pluto
- Pocahontas
- Quofaloma
- Richland
- Sandhill
- Scotland
- Sharon
- Thornton
- Tinsley
- Tolarville
- Vaughan
- Whitfield

== Demographics ==
Historical population
| Census | Pop. | Note | %± |
|---|---|---|---|
| 1850 | 95,614 | | — |
| 1860 | 129,998 | | 36.0% |
| 1870 | 127,388 | | −2.0% |
| 1880 | 183,145 | | 43.8% |
| 1890 | 192,257 | | 5.0% |
| 1900 | 233,996 | | 21.7% |
| 1910 | 260,050 | | 11.1% |
| 1920 | 225,117 | | −13.4% |
| 1930 | 269,574 | | 19.7% |
| 1940 | 308,510 | | 14.4% |
| 1950 | 326,230 | | 5.7% |
| 1960 | 360,525 | | 10.5% |
| 1970 | 383,763 | | 6.4% |
| 1980 | 462,301 | | 20.5% |
| 1990 | 494,051 | | 6.9% |
| 2000 | 546,955 | | 10.7% |
| 2010 | 586,320 | | 7.2% |
| 2020 | 597,727 | | 1.9% |
U.S. Decennial Census; 1790–1960 1900–1990; 1990–2000

As of the census of 2000, there were 497,197 people, 180,556 households, and 127,704 families residing within the MSA. The racial makeup of the MSA was 53.02% White, 45.29% African American, 0.13% Native American, 0.67% Asian, 0.02% Pacific Islander, 0.29% from other races, and 0.60% from two or more races. Hispanic or Latino of any race were 0.98% of the population.

== Geography and climate ==
The Jackson metropolitan area possesses a humid subtropical climate, with very hot, humid summers and mild winters. Rain is very evenly spread throughout the year, and snow can fall in wintertime, although heavy snowfall is relatively rare. Much of the areas rainfall occurs during thunderstorms. Thunder is heard on roughly 70 days per annum. The Jackson metropolitan area lies in a region prone to severe thunderstorms which can produce large hail, damaging winds and tornadoes.

The most damaging tornado in Mississippi history occurred on March 3, 1966, when an EF-5 tornado spawned in southwest Hinds County and proceeded to move northeasterly for several hours until finally lifting in southwest Tuscaloosa County, Alabama. The storm, called the Candlestick Park tornado for a destroyed Jackson shopping center, killed 58 and injured 216.

City of Jackson; Monthly Normal and Record High and Low Temperatures
| Month | Jan | Feb | Mar | Apr | May | Jun | Jul | Aug | Sep | Oct | Nov | Dec |
| Rec High °F | 83 | 85 | 89 | 94 | 99 | 105 | 106 | 107 | 104 | 95 | 88 | 84 |
| Norm High °F | 55.1 | 60.3 | 68.1 | 75 | 82.1 | 88.9 | 91.4 | 91.4 | 86.4 | 76.8 | 66.3 | 57.9 |
| Norm Low °F | 35 | 38.2 | 45.4 | 51.7 | 61 | 68.1 | 71.4 | 70.3 | 64.6 | 52 | 43.4 | 37.3 |
| Rec Low °F | 2 | 10 | 15 | 27 | 38 | 47 | 51 | 54 | 35 | 26 | 17 | 4 |
| Precip (in) | 5.67 | 4.5 | 5.74 | 5.98 | 4.86 | 3.82 | 4.69 | 3.66 | 3.23 | 3.42 | 5.04 | 5.34 |
Source: USTravelWeather.com

== Industry ==
The metro area is home to several major industries. These include electrical equipment and machinery, processed food, and primary and fabricated metal products. The surrounding area supports agricultural development of livestock, soybeans, cotton, and poultry.

== Education ==
=== Colleges and universities ===
  - Belhaven University (Jackson)
  - Copiah-Lincoln Community College (Wesson)
  - Delta Technical College (Ridgeland) www.deltatechnicalcollege.com
  - Hinds Community College (Raymond with branch campuses in Jackson, Pearl, and Utica)
  - Holmes Community College (Goodman with branch campus in Ridgeland)
  - Jackson State University (Jackson)
  - Millsaps College (Jackson)
  - Mississippi College (Clinton)
    - Mississippi College School of Law (Jackson)
  - Reformed Theological Seminary (Jackson)
  - Tougaloo College (Jackson)
  - University of Mississippi Medical Center (Jackson)
  - University Center (Jackson) - serves as branch campuses for the University of Mississippi, Mississippi State University, and University of Southern Mississippi.
  - Wesley Biblical Seminary (Jackson)
  - Wesley College (Florence)

=== Public school districts ===
  - Canton Public School District (serves the city of Canton)
  - Clinton Public School District (serves the city of Clinton)
  - Copiah County School District (serves Copiah County outside Hazlehurst)
  - Hazlehurst City School District (serves the city of Hazlehurst)
  - Hinds County School District (serves Hinds County outside Jackson and Clinton)
  - Holmes County School District (serves Holmes County)
  - Jackson Public School District (serves the city of Jackson)
  - Madison County School District (serves Madison County outside Canton)
  - Pearl Public School District (serves the city of Pearl)
  - Rankin County School District (serves Rankin County outside Pearl)
  - Simpson County School District (serves Simpson County)
  - Yazoo City Municipal School District (serves Yazoo City)
  - Yazoo County School District (serves Yazoo County outside Yazoo City)

=== Private schools ===
- Benton Academy (Benton)
- Canton Academy (Canton)
- Central Hinds Academy (Raymond)
- Central Holmes Christian School (Lexington)
- Christ Covenant School (Ridgeland)
- Clinton Christian Academy (Clinton)
- Copiah Academy (Gallman)
- Discovery Christian School (Florence)
- East Rankin Academy (Pelahatchie)
- Emmanuel Christian School (Jackson)
- First Presbyterian Day School (Jackson)
- Hartfield Academy (Flowood)
- Hillcrest Christian School (Jackson)
- Jackson Academy (Jackson)
- Jackson Preparatory School (Flowood)
- Madison-Ridgeland Academy (Madison)
- Manchester Academy (Yazoo City)
- Mount Salus Christian School (Clinton)
- New Jerusalem Christian School (Jackson)
- Park Place Christian Academy (Pearl)
- Piney Woods Country Life School (rural Rankin County) Home
- REBUL Academy (Learned)
- Simpson Academy (Mendenhall)
- St. Augustine Christian School (Ridgeland)
- St. Andrew's Episcopal School (middle and upper schools in Ridgeland; lower school in Jackson)
- St. Joseph Catholic School (Madison)
- Tri-County Academy (Flora)

== Media ==
=== Newspapers ===
==== Daily ====
- The Clarion-Ledger statewide general interest newspaper, at http://www.clarionledger.com

==== Weekly ====
- Copiah Monitor, weekly newspaper serving Copiah County (home office Hazelhurst), at http://www.copiahmonitor.com
- Hinds County Gazette, weekly newspaper serving Hinds County (home office Raymond), at http://www.hindscountygazette.com
- Jackson Advocate, weekly newspaper and oldest newspaper serving the state's African-American community, at http://www.jacksonadvocate.com
- Jackson Free Press, alternative newspaper, with focus on politics, entertainment and culture; blogs and discussion at http://www.jacksonfreepress.com
- La Noticia de Mississippi – Voz de la Comunidad Latina – The Mississippi Hispanic Newspaper at http://www.lanoticianewspaper.com/
- The Mississippi Link weekly statewide general interest newspaper (home office Jackson), focusing on the African American community, at http://www.themississippilink.com
- Mississippi Business Journal weekly newspaper (home office Jackson), with focus on business and economic development, at http://www.msbusiness.com
- The Northside Sun weekly newspaper, with focus on Northeast Jackson, Madison and Ridgeland, at http://www.northsidesun.com
- B Fit and Healthy Magazine, Health and Fitness Magazine for Mississippians, at http://bfitandhealthymagazine.com
- Holmes County Herald, weekly newspaper serving Holmes County (home office Lexington, at http://www.holmescountyherald.com
- Madison County Herald, weekly newspaper serving Madison County (home office Canton), at http://www.mcherald.com
- Madison County Journal, weekly newspaper serving mostly Madison County suburbs of Jackson (home office Ridgeland), at http://www.onlinemadison.net
- Rankin County News, weekly newspaper serving Rankin County (home office Brandon), at http://www.rankincn.com
- Magee Herald/Simpson County News, weekly newspaper serving Simpson County (offices in Magee and Mendenhall), at //www.simpsoncounty.ms
- Yazoo Herald, weekly newspaper serving Yazoo County (home office Yazoo City), at http://www.yazooherald.net

==== Historic ====
- The Jackson Mississippian, circulated during the 19th century
- Jackson Daily News, evening newspaper in Jackson (published 1907 to 1934; merged with The Clarion-Ledger in 1934 but editorially operated separately; discontinued publishing in 1982)
- Jackson State-Times, daily newspaper in Jackson (published 1952 to 1963)

=== Publishing ===
- University Press of Mississippi, the state's only not-for-profit publishing house and collective publisher for Mississippi's eight state universities, producing works on local history, culture and society

=== Television ===
All stations are licensed to Jackson unless otherwise noted:

- Channel 3, WLBT: NBC
- Channel 6, WJMF-LD
- Channel 12, WJTV: The CW
- Channel 16, WAPT: ABC/CBS
- Channel 23, WWJX: TCT
- Channel 29, WMPN: PBS/Mississippi Public Broadcasting
- Channel 34, WRBJ-TV: TBN, licensed to Magee
- Channel 35, WLOO: My Network TV, licensed to Jackson suburb Tougaloo
- Channel 40, WDBD: Fox

=== FM radio ===
- 88.5 WJSU: Jazz; National Public Radio
- 90.1 WMPR: Variety
- 91.3 WMPN: Mississippi Public Broadcasting; National Public Radio; Public Radio
- 92.1 WJNS-FM: Religious
- 92.5 WQST: American Family Radio; Religious
- 93.5 WHJT: Country (93.1 FM translator)
- 93.9 WJAI: Air1; Christian Contemporary
- 94.1 WYAD-LP: Gospel Music
- 94.7 WJLV: K-Love; Christian Contemporary
- 95.5 WHLH: Gospel Music
- 96.3 WUSJ: Country
- 97.3 WFMN: Supertalk Mississippi; Talk
- 97.7 WRBJ-FM: Hip Hop
- 98.7 WJKK: Adult Contemporary
- 99.7 WJMI: Hip Hop
- 100.5 WRTM-FM: Urban Contemporary
- 100.9 WJXN: Hip Hop
- 101.1 WLIN: Adult contemporary
- 101.7 WYOY: Top-40
- 102.9 WMSI: Country
- 103.9 WYAB: Talk
- 104.3 WPBP-LP: Community radio (Pearl)
- 105.1 WJDX-FM: Mainstream urban
- 105.9 WRKS: Sports
- 106.7 WSTZ-FM: Classic Rock
- 107.5 WKXI-FM: Urban Contemporary

=== AM radio ===
- 620 WJDX: News/Talk (104.7 FM translator)
- 780 WIIN: Blues (102.1 FM translator)
- 810 WSJC: Religious (95.9 FM translator)
- 930 WSFZ: News/Talk with programming from Black Information Network (98.1 FM translator)
- 970 WFQY: Hip Hop (99.1 FM translator)
- 1120 WTWZ: Religious/Oldies (102.5 FM translator)
- 1180 WJNT: News/Talk (96.9 FM translator)
- 1240 WZQK: Classic hits (94.3 FM translator)
- 1300 WOAD: Gospel Music (103.5 FM translator)
- 1370 WMGO: Urban Contemporary
- 1400 WJQS: Sports (106.3 FM translator)

== Points of interest ==
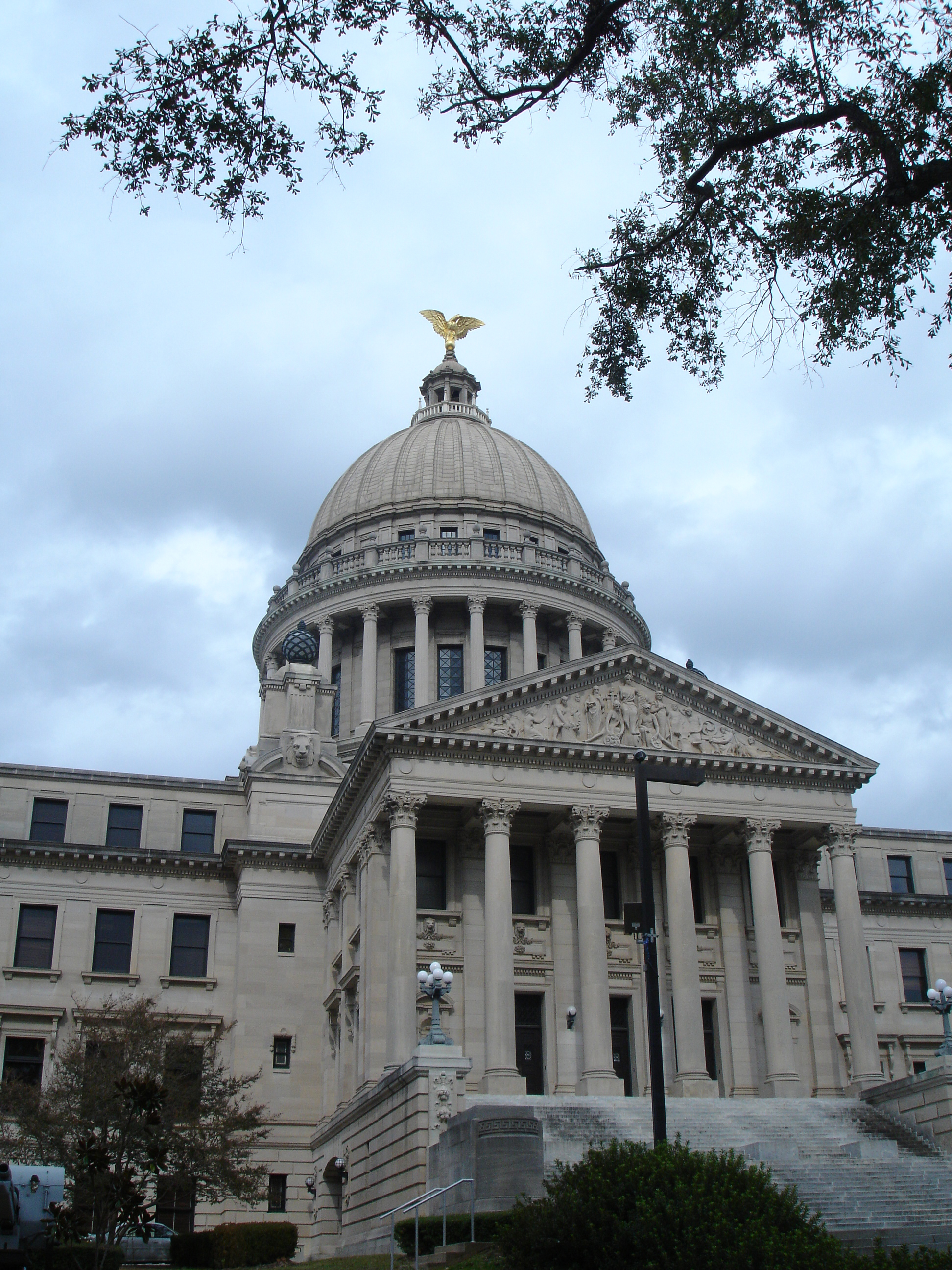
Mississippi State Capitol

== Sports ==
=== Sports teams in the Jackson Metro area ===
- Mississippi Brilla—minor league soccer team in the Premier Development League. The team plays at Clinton High School in Clinton, Mississippi.
- Mississippi Raiders—Arena Indoor Football League team which plays its home games at the Mississippi Coliseum.

=== Summer Training Camp ===
- New Orleans Saints, Jackson's Millsaps College is the former summer home for the New Orleans Saints of the NFL from 2006 to 2010

=== Sports venues in the Jackson Metro area ===
- Mississippi Veterans Memorial Stadium—Concerts, Football (home of Jackson State University)
- Mississippi Coliseum—Basketball, Hockey, Track, Rodeo, Concerts
- Smith Wills Stadium—Baseball, Softball, Football, Soccer, Concerts
- Trustmark Park—Baseball
- Parham Bridges—Tennis

=== Professional events ===
- Sanderson Farms Championship-PGA Tour event held in May at Country Club of Jackson

=== Former professional sports teams ===
- Baseball
  - Jackson Senators, Independent (2001–2004)
  - Jackson Diamond Kats of the independent Texas–Louisiana League (2000)
  - Jackson Generals, former Texas League AA affiliate of the Houston Astros (1991–1999)
  - Jackson Mets, former Texas League AA affiliate of the New York Mets (1975–1990)
- Basketball
  - Jackson Wildcats, United States Basketball League
  - Mississippi Rage, World Basketball Association
  - Mississippi Hardhats, World Basketball Association
- Hockey
  - Jackson Bandits -- East Coast Hockey League
- Soccer
  - Jackson Calypso—Women's Soccer
  - Jackson Rockers—Men's Soccer
  - Jackson Chargers—Men's Soccer
- Football
  - Mississippi Pride -- Regional Football League
  - Las Vegas Posse -- Canadian Football League—As a historical note, the team almost moved to Jackson, but efforts to relocate the team to Mississippi failed.

== Transportation ==
=== Air travel ===
The Jackson area is currently served by Jackson-Evers International Airport, located at Allen C. Thompson Field in Rankin County between Flowood and Pearl. Its IATA code is JAN. The airport has non-stop service to 12 cities throughout the United States and is served by four mainline carriers (American, Delta, United, and Southwest). JAN also serves as host for the State of Mississippi's and private citizens' jet aircraft.

On 22 December 2004, Jackson City Council members voted 6–0 to rename Jackson International Airport in honor of slain civil rights leader and NAACP field secretary for Mississippi, Medgar Evers. This decision took effect on 22 January 2005.

The Jackson area was formerly served by Hawkins Field, located in northwest Jackson with IATA code HKS. This airport is now used for private air traffic only.

A proposed new access from Downtown Jackson to Jackson-Evers International Airport is the Airport Parkway project. This parkway will connect High Street in Downtown Jackson to Mississippi Highway 475 at the airport. The parkway will be of interstate standards and designated Interstate 755 with access to both Flowood and Pearl. Although approved in 2008 with studies completed and right-of-way obtained, no construction has been done as of 2022.

=== Ground transportation ===
==== Interstate highways ====
Interstate 55
Runs north-south from Chicago through Jackson towards Brookhaven, McComb, and the Louisiana state line to New Orleans. Jackson is roughly halfway between New Orleans and Memphis, Tennessee. The highway maintains eight to ten lanes in northern part of city, six lanes in the center and south of I-20.

Interstate 20
Runs east-west from near El Paso, Texas, to Florence, South Carolina. Jackson is roughly halfway between Dallas, and Atlanta. The highway is six lanes from Interstate 220 to MS 468 in Pearl.

Interstate 220
Connects Interstates 55 and 20 on the north and west sides of the city and is four lanes throughout its route.

==== U.S. highways ====
U.S. Highway 49
Runs north-south from the Arkansas state line at Lula via Clarksdale and Yazoo City, to I-220 on the northwest side of Jackson. The highway then follows I-220 to I-20, where it heads east to just pass the I-55/I-20 split in Pearl. From Pearl US 49 goes south towards Hattiesburg and Gulfport.

U.S. Highway 51
The predecessor route from Chicago to New Orleans, US 51 runs along with I-55 from County Line Road on the Jackson/Ridgeland border to Terry. US 51 runs separately to the north in Ridgeland and to the south from Terry. The former route of Hwy 51 is designated as State Street through Jackson and connects with I-55/I-20 south of the interstate split in South Jackson

U.S. Highway 80
Roughly parallels Interstate 20.

==== State highways ====
Mississippi Highway 17
Runs from Carrollton on the north end, headed south towards North Pickens, then continues southeast from South Pickens to Farmhaven.

Mississippi Highway 18
Runs southwest towards Utica and Port Gibson; southeast towards Bay Springs and Quitman.

Mississippi Highway 22
Runs northeast from the Edwards intersection on I-20 to Flora, then continuing on towards Canton.

Mississippi Highway 25
Some parts of this road are known as Lakeland Drive, which runs northeast towards Carthage and Starkville.

==== Other roads ====
In addition, the area is served by the Natchez Trace Parkway, which runs from north of the city through Ridgeland and Clinton, Mississippi. Overall the federally-regulated parkway runs from Natchez to Nashville, Tennessee.

==== Bus service ====
JATRAN (Jackson Transit System) operates hourly or half-hourly during daytime hours on weekdays, and mostly hourly on Saturdays. No evening or Sunday service is operated.

=== Railroads 9 ===
The Jackson Metropolitan Area is served by the Canadian National Railway (formerly the Illinois Central Railroad) and the Kansas City Southern Railway. The Canadian National has a medium-sized yard downtown which Mill Street parallels and the Kansas City Southern has a large classification yard in Richland. Amtrak, the national passenger rail system, provides service to Jackson Metro area through the city of Jackson proper and Yazoo City, another city in the Delta region of Metro area. The Jackson Amtrak station is located at 300 West Capitol Street, while the Yazoo City Amtrak station is located at 222 West Broadway. Amtrak's southbound City of New Orleans provides service from Jackson to New Orleans and some points between. As well as providing long distance travel, Amtrak's City of New Orleans route also allows travel between Jackson and Yazoo City. The northbound City of New Orleans provides service from Jackson to Memphis, Carbondale, Champaign-Urbana, Chicago and some points between. Efforts to establish service with another Amtrak train, the Crescent Star, an extension of the Crescent westward from Meridian, Mississippi, to Dallas, Texas, failed in 2003.

== See also ==
- Mississippi census statistical areas
- List of metropolitan areas in Mississippi
- List of micropolitan areas in Mississippi
- List of cities in Mississippi
- List of towns and villages in Mississippi
- List of census-designated places in Mississippi
- List of United States metropolitan areas
