= Ituma =

Ituma could refer to:

- Ituma, Mississippi, United States, an unincorporated community
- Julia Ituma (2004–2023), Italian volleyball player
