= Hartman Turnbow =

American Civil Rights Movement activist

- Born: March 20, 1905; Mileston, Mississippi, U.S.
- Died: August 15, 1988 (aged 83); Lexington, Mississippi, U.S.
- Occupation: Independent farmer
- Known for: Civil Rights Movement
- Spouse: 2

Hartman Turnbow (March 20, 1905 – August 15, 1988) was a Mississippi farmer, orator, and activist during the Civil Rights Movement. On April 9, 1963, Turnbow was one of the first African Americans to attempt to register to vote in Mississippi, along with a group called the "First Fourteen".

== Early life ==
Turnbow was born on March 20, 1905, in Mileston, Mississippi. His grandparents were former slaves and he inherited their farm. He moved to Chicago, Illinois, where he met and married his second wife Dee. They returned to Mississippi with their children, settling in Tchula, where he became an independent farmer and owned his land.

== Civil Rights Movement ==
=== Voter registration ===
On April 9, 1963, Turnbow, with a group of 13 other African Americans, including Hollis Watkins, Ozell Mitchell, and Alma Mitchell Carnegie arrived at the Holmes County, Mississippi courthouse in Lexington in an attempt to register to vote. This group became known as the "First Fourteen".

The "First Fourteen" were approached by a myriad of whites who attempted to intimidate and prevent the group from registering to vote. In a thick mob of angry whites, deputy sheriff, Andrew Smith, with his hand on his gun holster, called out, "All right now, who will be the first?" At that point, Turnbow stepped forward and told the deputy sheriff "Me, Hartman Turnbow. I came here to die to vote. I'm the first." All fourteen took the literacy test and were failed by the circuit clerk. Although none of the "first fourteen" were able to register, their pride and courage drove the Movement in Holmes County.

=== Mississippi Freedom Democratic Party (MFDP) ===
In April 1964, the Mississippi Freedom Democratic Party (MFDP) was founded. Turnbow was elected delegate of the Mississippi Freedom Democratic Party (MFDP) at the 1964 Democratic National Convention in Atlantic City, New Jersey where he testified his personal accounts with voter suppression. Turnbow spoke in an unusual way that is now known as "Turnbowisms" and had a tendency to utter malapropisms, as he once referred to Student Non-Violent Coordinating Committee (SNCC) as the "student violent non-coordinated committee." Yet he knew how to deliver powerful speeches and act as an inspirational leader for others.

=== Nonviolence Freedom Movement ===
Hartman Turnbow famously confronted Martin Luther King Jr. informing him: "This nonviolent stuff ain't no good. It'll get you killed." The practice of nonviolence has been a centerpiece tactic for African Americans in the Civil Rights Movement and King wished to elevate this tactic.

In May 1963, Turnbow fought off an attack on his family and himself with rifle fire. Being consistent with the foundation of the freedom movement, Turnbow explained, "I wasn't being non-nonviolent, I was just protectin' my family." In this instance, Turnbow exercised his right to private self-defense just like Fannie Lou Hamer.

SNCC's Joyce Ladner accompanied Turnbow and his wife in Atlantic City for the 1964 Democratic National Convention. She recalls, "Mrs. Turnbow always carried a little brown paper bag. She had a pistol in it... But she didn't trust those people. I mean people had tried to firebomb her home, so she might have been in the presence of a senator and a congresswoman, but she carried a gun."

== Personal life ==
=== House fire and arrest ===
On May 7, 1963, Turnbow and his wife Dee took their daughter to choir practice at 7:00 pm. The family returned home around 9:30 pm, when Dee noticed a vent was open in the kitchen ceiling. A quick search around the house was done, but nothing was found so the Turnbow family went to sleep. Around 3:00 am on the morning of May 8, Turnbow was awakened by the sound of an explosion, flames, and smoke. His wife and daughter ran outside while two men started to shoot at Turnbow. Turnbow, with his .22 sixteen-shooter rifle in hand, shot back at the two assailants until he emptied that .22 rifle. The two white men ran away while Turnbow and his family spent the next few hours getting the flames under control.

Sheriff Smith accompanied by a deputy and FBI agent arrived at the scene at 9:00 am. Bob Moses, a non-Mississippi voter registration worker, was also on the scene of investigation taking pictures of the fire. Moses was told to stop taking pictures by an investigator and was immediately arrested for interfering with the investigation after taking Sheriff Smith's picture. Turnbow and several other SNCC workers were later charged for arson and arrested by Smith. The only piece of evidence at the preliminary hearing was a testimony given by Sheriff Smith. County Attorney Pat M. Barrett said he was "not a demolition expert," but "it just couldn't have happened. There is no way on God's earth for that situation over there to have happened like he said it happened." As a result of the case, Turnbow was bound over under $500 bond by the Holmes County Grand Jury. The charges against the other SNCC workers were dismissed for lack of evidence after they spent five nights in jail.

Hartman Turnbow was attacked and framed for arson because he was one of the first African Americans that step forward to vote in Mississippi. In a reflection on his attack, Turnbow states,

Anybody had'a just told me 'fore it happened that conditions would make this much change between the white and the black in Holmes County here where I live, why I'da just said, "you're lyin'. It won't happen." I just wouldn't have believed it. I didn't dream of it. I didn't see no way. But it got to workin' just like the citizenship class teacher told us—that if we could redish' to vote and just stick with it. He says it's gon' be some difficults, gon' have troubles, folks gon' lose their lives, peoples gon' lose all their money, and just like he said, all of that happened. He didn't miss it. He hit it ka-dap on the head, and it's workin' now. It won't never go back where it was.

=== Marriages and children ===
Turnbow was married and had six children, sons Jewross and Hartman, and daughters Mae Alice, Mae Bell, Mary and Christine.

=== Death ===
Turnbow died on August 15, 1988, at the Methodist Hospital of Middle Mississippi in Lexington at the age of 83. His funeral was held on August 24 at Rock of Ages Church of God in Christ in Tchula. Elder Fred Wade officiated with interment in the Pinkston Cemetery north of Lexington.

== Legacy ==
Turnbow's courageous effort to register to vote succeeded and gave Black people in the South a voice regarding which politicians would represent them. He is best known for his independent spirit and orating the truth. The unusual way that Turnbow spoke is now known as "Turnbowisms". Voting rights activist Sue (Lorenzi) Sojourner said this about Turnbow's oration:

His words flowed rapidly with lilting energy. They tumbled from his mouth, often indecipherable to my inexperienced ears.

An example of the way Turnbow spoke can be found in this excerpt, when during Freedom Summer he tried to persuade more black Mississippians to vote:

That lynching I was tellin you about—that one with the burning with the 'cetylene torch—that 'n was a turning point. It just... made a Negro mad, got to thinking he'd rather die anyway but to be all burnt up with a torch while he's still living. But this now, this is something that we is in together. We was all together trying to do something … The Negro ain't gonna stand fo all that beating and lynching and bombing and stuff. They found out when they tried to stop us from redishing [a Turnbowism for registering] that every time they bombed or shot or beat or cut credit, ... it... just made him angry and more determined to keep on... and get redished.
