= Mileston, Mississippi =

- Unincorporated community
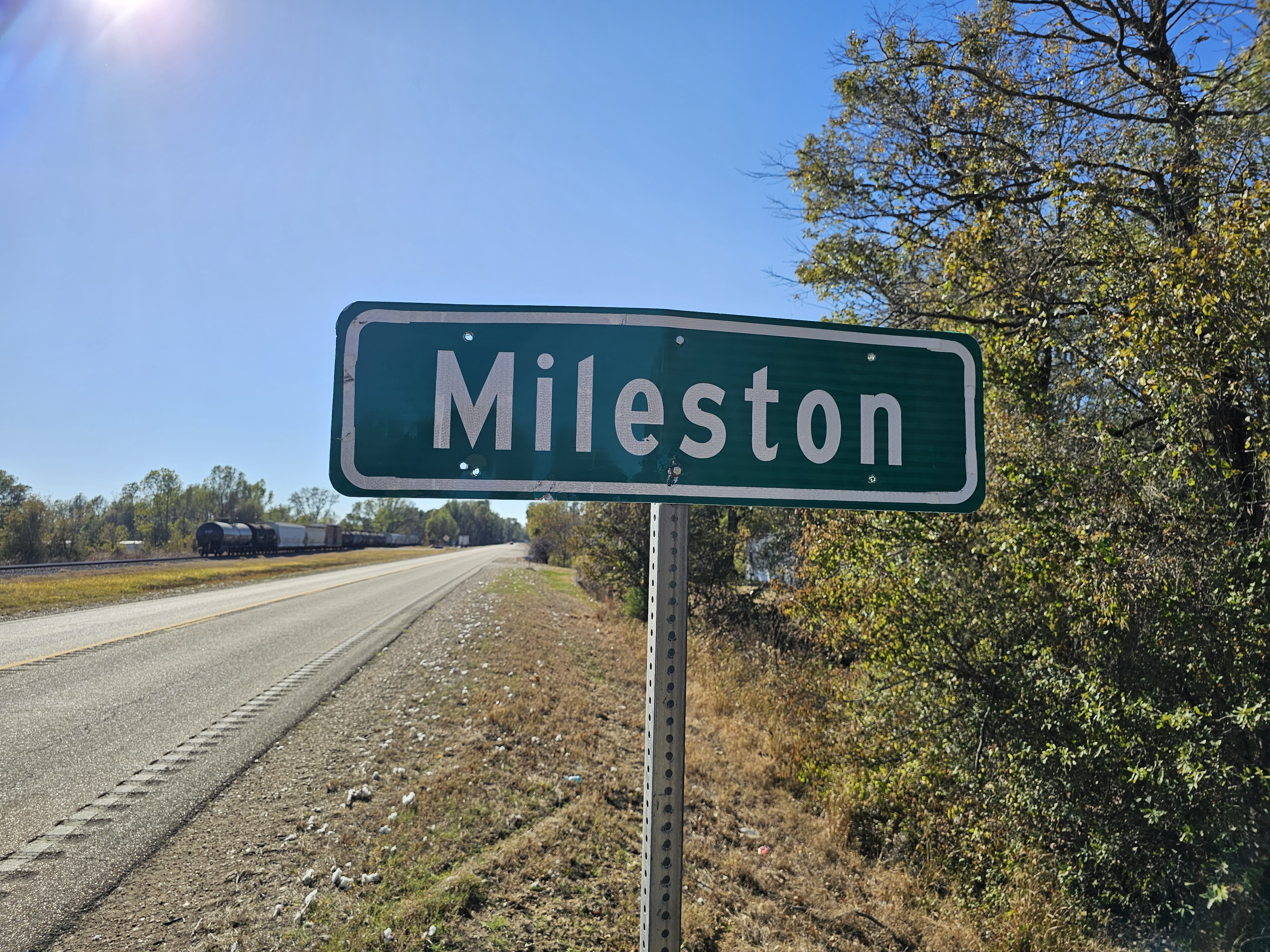
- Highway Sign outside of Mileston

- Location within Mississippi Location within the United States
- Coordinates: 33°06′37″N 90°16′24″W
- Country: United States
- State: Mississippi
- County: Holmes
- Elevation: 112 ft (34 m)
- Time zone: UTC-6 (Central (CST))
  - Summer (DST): UTC-5 (CDT)
- ZIP code: 39169
- Area code: 662
- GNIS feature ID

Mileston is an unincorporated community located in Holmes County, Mississippi. Mileston is located on U.S. Highway 49E and Highway 12, approximately 6 miles (9.7 km) south of Tchula, approximately 4 miles (6.4 km) north of Thornton and approximately 3 miles (4.8 km) southeast of Marcella.

It is about 17 miles (27 km) north of Yazoo City. Mileston is located on the Canadian National Railway.

== History ==
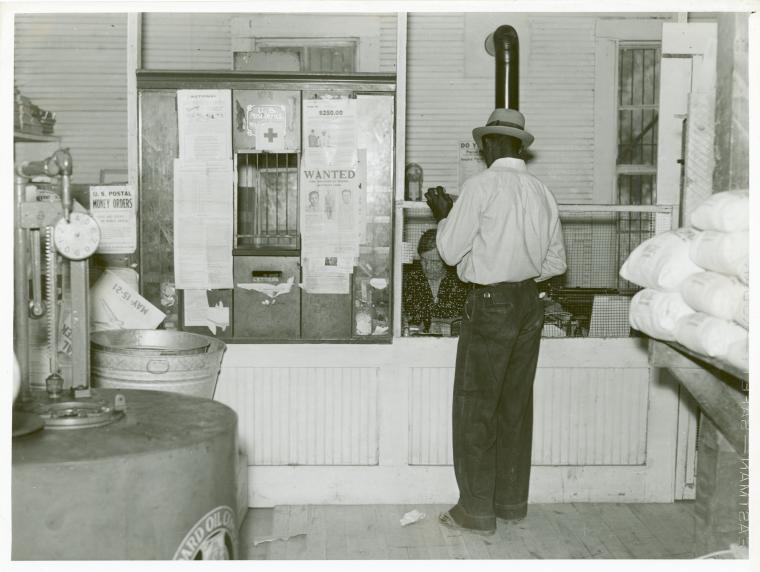
Post office in back of the plantation store, 1939

Mileston is named for a former plantation. In 1940, the United States government purchased approximately ten-thousand acres of the former W. E. Jones estate as part of the Resettlement Administration. The land was split into seventy individual plots with an additional cooperative farm that included thirty plots. The community was home to a cotton gin, school, store, blacksmith shop, and medical clinic. W. Ralph Eubanks' father taught agronomy at the Mileston school.

A post office operated under the name Mileston from 1888 to 1953.

Much of the land in Mileston is owned by descendants of the original African American sharecroppers. In 2000, the West Holmes Community Development Organization and the state of Mississippi began operating a farmers' market in Mileston.

Marion Post Wolcott documented people and scenes from the Mileston plantation in 1939 as part of her work with the Farm Security Administration.

=== Civil Rights Movement ===
Mileston was the epicenter of the Civil Rights Movement in Holmes County. In March 1963, the Student Nonviolent Coordinating Committee began work in Holmes County after being contacted by residents of Mileston. The next month, fourteen African Americans from Mileston (known as the First Fourteen) traveled to Lexington and unsuccessfully registered to vote.

One of the first citizenship schools in Mississippi was held at the Mileston community center and many attendees became members of the Mississippi Freedom Democratic Party.

== Transportation ==
Amtrak’s City of New Orleans, which operates between New Orleans and Chicago, passes through the town on CN tracks, but makes no stop. The nearest station is located in Yazoo City, 22 miles (35 km) to the south.

== Education ==
Residents are in the Holmes County School District, and are assigned to Holmes County Central High School.

The school district previously operated a school in Mileston: previously Mileston Elementary School (K-6), later Mileston Middle School, which housed up to 130 students.

== Notable person ==
- Hartman Turnbow, activist during the Civil Rights Movement

== Images ==
Photos taken in 1939 by Marion Post Wolcott

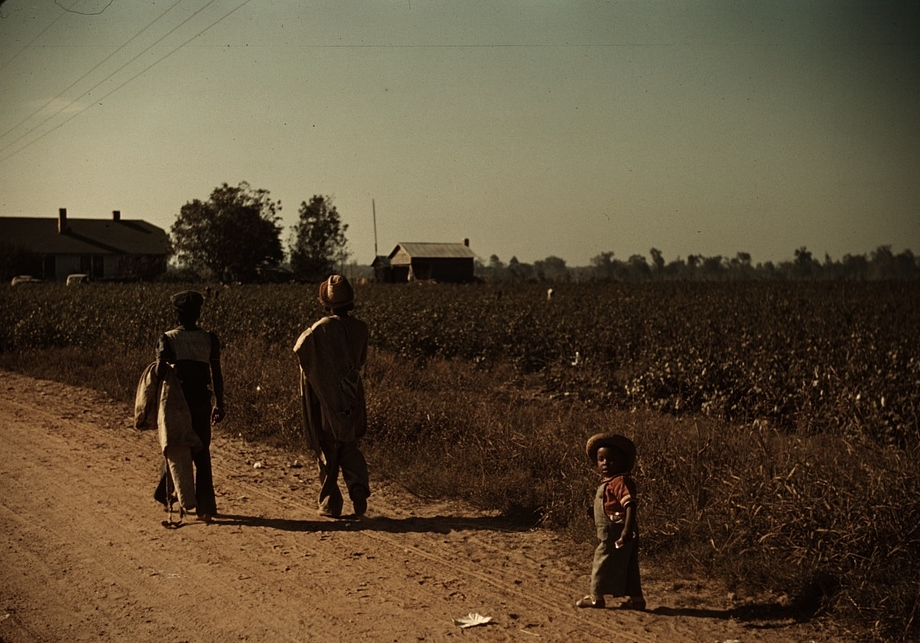
Marcella Plantation in Mileston

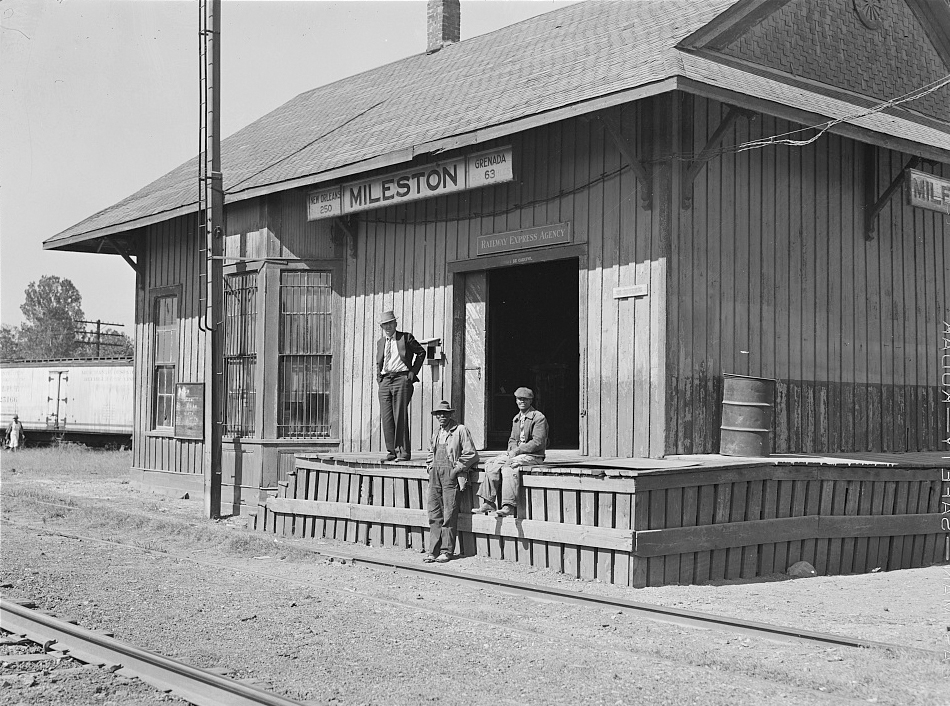
Railway depot

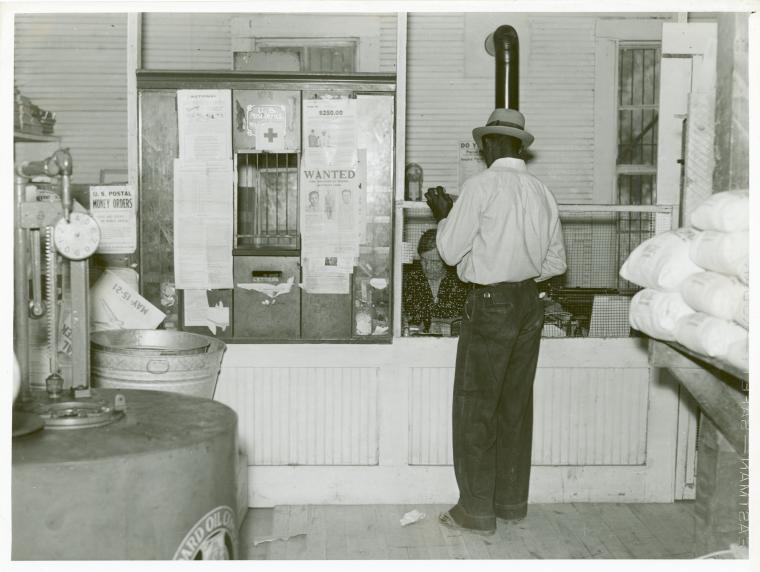
Mileston Post Office

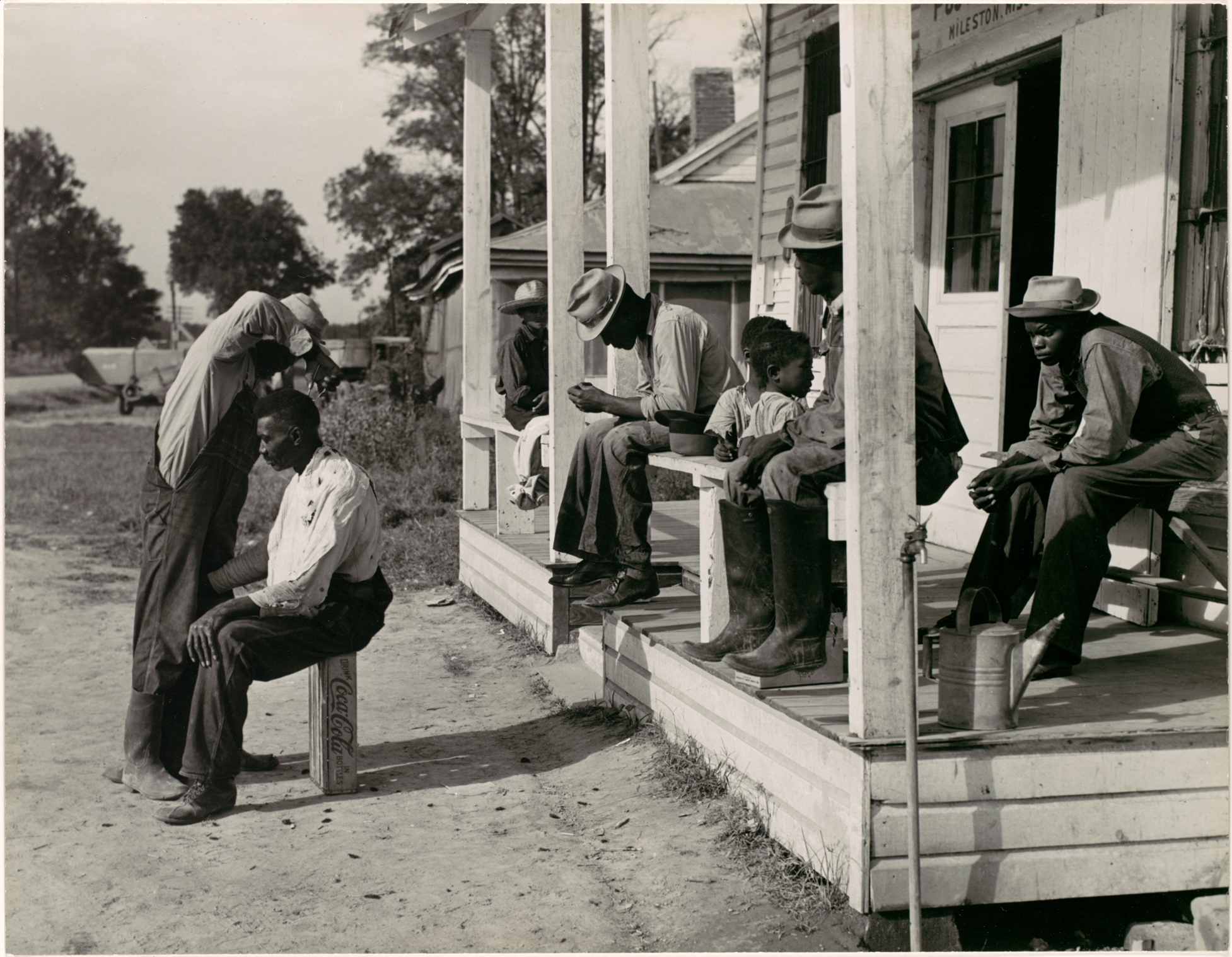
Open-air barber
