= Bob Quick (basketball) =

American basketball player

Personal information
- Born: March 5, 1946 (age 80) Thornton, Mississippi, U.S.
- Listed height: 6 ft 5 in (1.96 m)
- Listed weight: 215 lb (98 kg)

Career information
- High school: Hughes Center (Cincinnati, Ohio)
- College: Xavier (1965–1968)
- NBA draft: 1968: 2nd round, 18th overall pick
- Drafted by: Baltimore Bullets
- Playing career: 1968–1972
- Position: Small forward / shooting guard
- Number: 15, 14

Career history
- 1968–1970: Baltimore Bullets
- 1970: Sunbury Mercuries
- 1970–1971: Detroit Pistons
- 1971–1972: Dallas Chaparrals

Career NBA and ABA statistics
- Points: 848 (6.0 ppg)
- Rebounds: 395 (2.8 rpg)
- Assists: 94 (0.7 apg)
- Stats at NBA.com
- Stats at Basketball Reference

Robert L. Quick (born March 5, 1946) is an American former National Basketball Association (NBA) and American Basketball Association (ABA) player.

== Early life ==
Born in Thornton, Mississippi, Quick grew up in Cincinnati and attended Hughes Center High School. In 2006, The Cincinnati Enquirer ranked Quick #49 in its Top 100 all-time Greater Cincinnati high school players.

== College career ==
Quick played college basketball at Xavier University in Cincinnati.

The 6-foot-5 (196 cm) forward was Xavier's MVP for all three of his varsity seasons with the Musketeers. He scored 1,636 career points and had 939 career rebounds. Quick was consistent throughout his college career, averaging 20.0 points per game as a sophomore, 19.3 as a junior, and 23.7 as a senior. He also led the team in rebounding twice, averaging 11.6 per game as a sophomore and 14.0 as a senior.

He had his best season as a senior, averaging team highs of 23.7 points and 14.0 rebounds. He made a school record 22 free throws of a school record 24 attempts en route to a career high 40 points against Marquette University on February 26, 1968. That was one of seven 30-point games his senior season. He was named Honorable Mention All-America by the Associated Press.

Quick set then-school records for most free throws made in a season (179) and a career (428) as well as most free throws attempted in a season (251) and a career (600).

He was inducted into the Xavier University Hall of Fame in 1982.

== Professional career ==
Quick was selected by the Baltimore Bullets in the second round (18th overall) of the 1968 NBA draft.

Quick played four seasons in the NBA from 1968–69 to 1971–72 with the Bullets and Detroit Pistons. He was traded from the Bullets to the Pistons for Eddie Miles on February 1, 1970 in a transaction that also involved both teams exchanging selections in the subsequent draft with Detroit receiving a second-round pick (32nd overall–Ken Warzynski) and Baltimore a fourth-rounder (54th overall–Bill Stricker). His most productive season was the next season, 1970–71 with the Pistons, averaging 8.0 points and 4.1 rebounds per game. He averaged 6.0 points and 2.8 rebounds for his NBA career.

In 1971–72, he also played in the ABA for the Dallas Chaparrals, averaging 4.3 points and 2.3 points.

A knee injury ended his career.

After basketball, he worked in marketing and advertising, founding Chromagraphics Inc., ultimately growing the Detroit-based company into a million-dollar enterprise.

In 1996, Quick left advertising and moved to Florida. He later worked as a sales consultant for a Cincinnati auto dealer.

== Career statistics ==
Legend
GP	Games played	GS	Games started	MPG	Minutes per game
FG%	Field goal percentage	3P%	3-point field goal percentage	FT%	Free throw percentage
RPG	Rebounds per game	APG	Assists per game	SPG	Steals per game
BPG	Blocks per game	PPG	Points per game	**Bold**	Career high

=== NBA/ABA ===
==== Regular season ====
Year	Team	GP	MPG	FG%	3P%	FT%	RPG	APG	PPG
1968–69	Baltimore	28	5.5	.411		.614	.9	.4	3.1
1969–70	Baltimore	15	4.5	.500		.667	.8	.2	2.7
1969–70	Detroit	19	15.6	.441		.698	3.3	.6	7.1
1970–71	Detroit	**56**	**20.5**	.455		.784	**4.1**	**1.0**	**8.0**
1971–72	Detroit	18	11.3	.476		.756	2.8	.6	6.2
1971–72	Dallas	6	9.5	**.533**	–	**1.000**	2.3	.2	4.3
Career (NBA)		136	13.7	.452		.738	2.8	.7	6.0
Career (overall)		142	13.6	.454	–	.746	2.8	.7	6.0

==== Playoffs ====
Year	Team	GP	MPG	FG%	FT%	RPG	APG	PPG
1969	Baltimore	2	4.5	.667	.000	.5	.0	2.0
