= Acona Church, Cemetery, and School =

Historic site in Holmes County, Mississippi, United States

- U.S. National Register of Historic Places
- Location within Mississippi Location within the United States
- Nearest city: Lexington, Mississippi
- Coordinates: 33°16′5″N 90°1′8″W
- Area: 3 acres (1.2 ha)
- Built: 1874
- Architectural style: Greek Revival
- NRHP reference No.: 02000210
- Added to NRHP: March 20, 2002

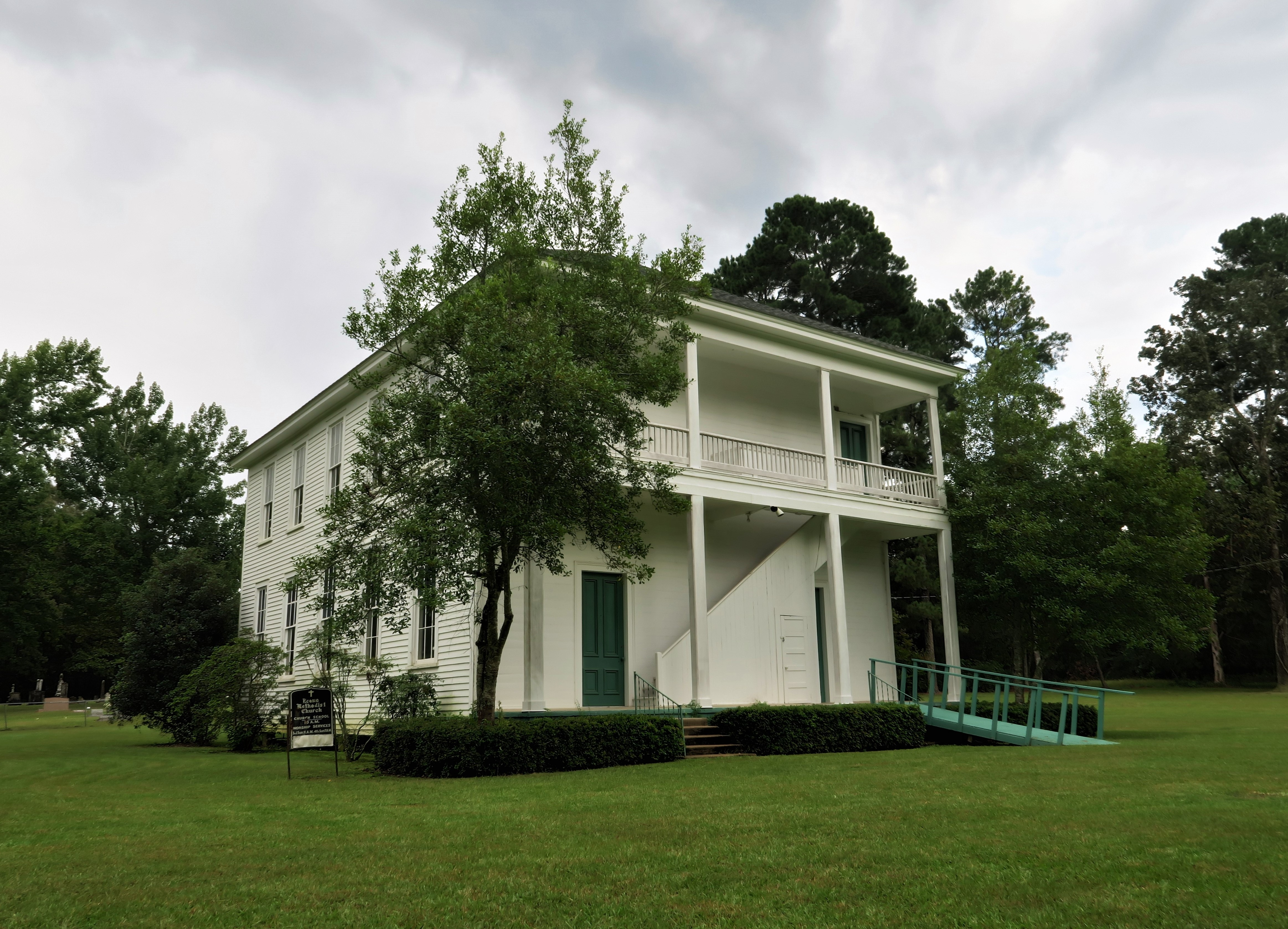

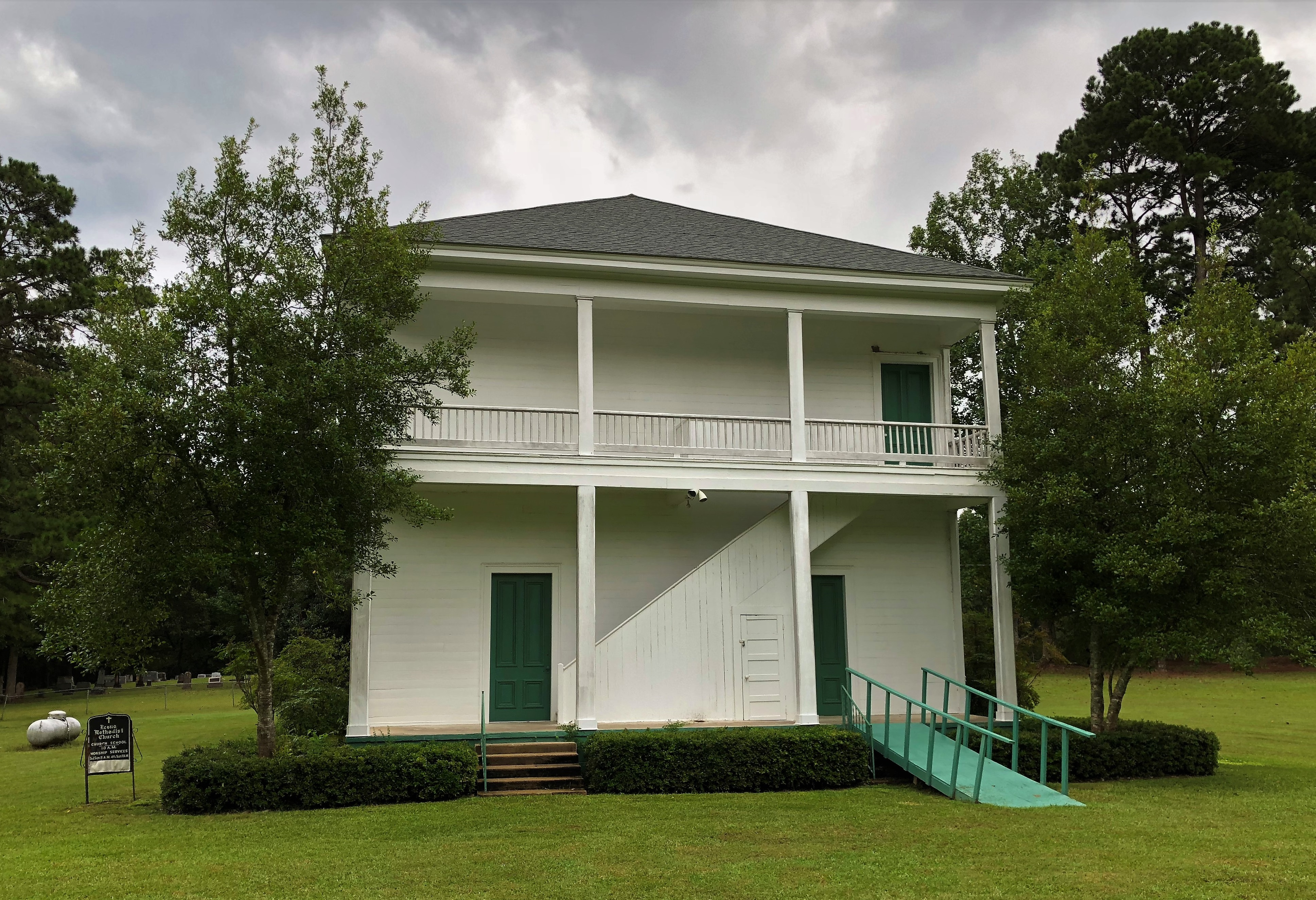

Acona Church, Cemetery, and School is a historic complex near Lexington, Mississippi, in the community of Acona. This combination of church, school and cemetery was once common in rural areas, but the Acona complex is one of the few surviving ones.

The church was built as a Methodist church in 1876 as a two-story building. The upper story was used for a lodge hall. A three-room separate building on one edge of the property served as the school. A cemetery was also developed here, with gravestones from the 1880s, and it was still in use in the early 21st century. The complex was listed on the National Register of Historic Places in 2002.
