= Tolarville, Mississippi =

- Unincorporated community
- Location within Mississippi Location within the United States
- Coordinates: 33°02′50″N 90°13′07″W
- Country: United States
- State: Mississippi
- County: Holmes
- Elevation: 351 ft (107 m)
- Time zone: UTC-6 (Central (CST))
  - Summer (DST): UTC-5 (CDT)
- ZIP code: 39169
- Area code: 662
- GNIS feature ID: 692270

Tolarville is an unincorporated community located in Holmes County, Mississippi, located approximately 10 miles (16 km) east of Thornton and approximately 3.5 miles (5.6 km) north of Coxburg. A post office operated under the name Tolarville from 1888 to 1914.
