= Oswego, Mississippi =

- Unincorporated community
- Location within Mississippi Location within the United States
- Coordinates: 33°13′01″N 90°13′28″W
- Country: United States
- State: Mississippi
- County: Holmes
- Elevation: 121 ft (37 m)
- Time zone: UTC-6 (Central (CST))
  - Summer (DST): UTC-5 (CDT)
- Area code: 662
- GNIS feature ID: 684316

Oswego is an extinct town in Holmes County, in the U.S. state of Mississippi. The GNIS classifies it as a populated place.

== History ==
The community's name is a transfer from Oswego, New York. A variant name was "Lacey".
