= Clarence Pierce =

American politician (1928–2026)

Member of the Mississippi House of Representatives from Carroll County
- In office January 1952 – January 1984

Personal details
- Born: October 1, 1928 Thornton, Mississippi, U.S.
- Died: January 11, 2026 (aged 97)
- Party: Democratic
- Occupation: Politician, legislative assistant

Clarence Albert Pierce Jr. (October 1, 1928 – January 11, 2026) was an American politician in the state of Mississippi. He served in the Mississippi House of Representatives from 1952 to 1984. He was a teacher and farmer. He attended the University of Mississippi, graduating in 1950. Pierce served as an assistant to Senator James Eastland when the Mississippi House was not in session.

Pierce died on January 11, 2026, at the age of 97.
