= Brozville, Mississippi =

- Unincorporated community
- Location within Mississippi Location within the United States
- Coordinates: 33°1′59″N 90°6′44″W
- Country: United States
- State: Mississippi
- County: Holmes
- Elevation: 351 ft (107 m)
- Time zone: UTC-6 (Central (CST))
  - Summer (DST): UTC-5 (CDT)
- Area code: 662
- GNIS feature ID: 667655

Brozville is an unincorporated community in Holmes County, Mississippi, United States. A post office operated under the name Brozville from 1895 to 1906.
