= Ituma, Mississippi =

- Unincorporated community
- Location within Mississippi Location within the United States
- Coordinates: 33°13′50″N 90°06′18″W
- Country: United States
- State: Mississippi
- County: Holmes
- Elevation: 292 ft (89 m)
- Time zone: UTC-6 (Central (CST))
  - Summer (DST): UTC-5 (CDT)
- ZIP code: 39169
- Area code: 662
- GNIS feature ID: 684305

Ituma is an unincorporated community located in Holmes County, Mississippi. Ituma is approximately 7 miles (11 km) southwest of Acona and approximately 10 miles (16 km) northeast of Tchula.

Ituma is a name derived from the Choctaw language.

A post office operated under the name Ituma from 1885 to 1914.
