= Marcella, Mississippi =

- Unincorporated community
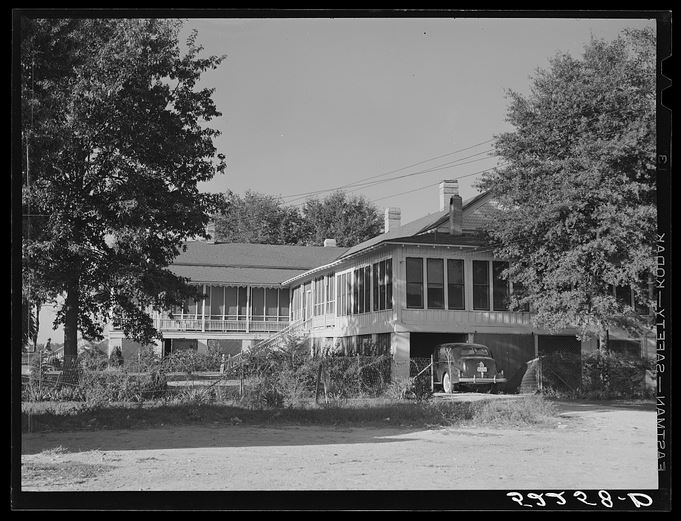
- Jones family home in Marcella in October 1939

- Location within Mississippi Location within the United States
- Coordinates: 33°07′46″N 90°17′51″W
- Country: United States
- State: Mississippi
- County: Holmes
- Elevation: 115 ft (35 m)
- Time zone: UTC-6 (Central (CST))
  - Summer (DST): UTC-5 (CDT)
- ZIP code: 39169
- Area code: 662
- GNIS feature ID: 673128

Marcella is an unincorporated community located in Holmes County, Mississippi near the Yazoo River. Marcella is located near Mississippi Highway 12 and is approximately 5 miles (8.0 km) north of Thornton, and approximately 9 miles (14 km) south of Tchula.

Marcella is named for the Marcella plantation.

A post office operated under the name Marcella from 1881 to 1894.

Marion Post Wolcott documented people and scenes from the Marcella plantation in October 1939 as part of her work with the Farm Security Administration.
