= Oregon, Mississippi =

- Unincorporated community
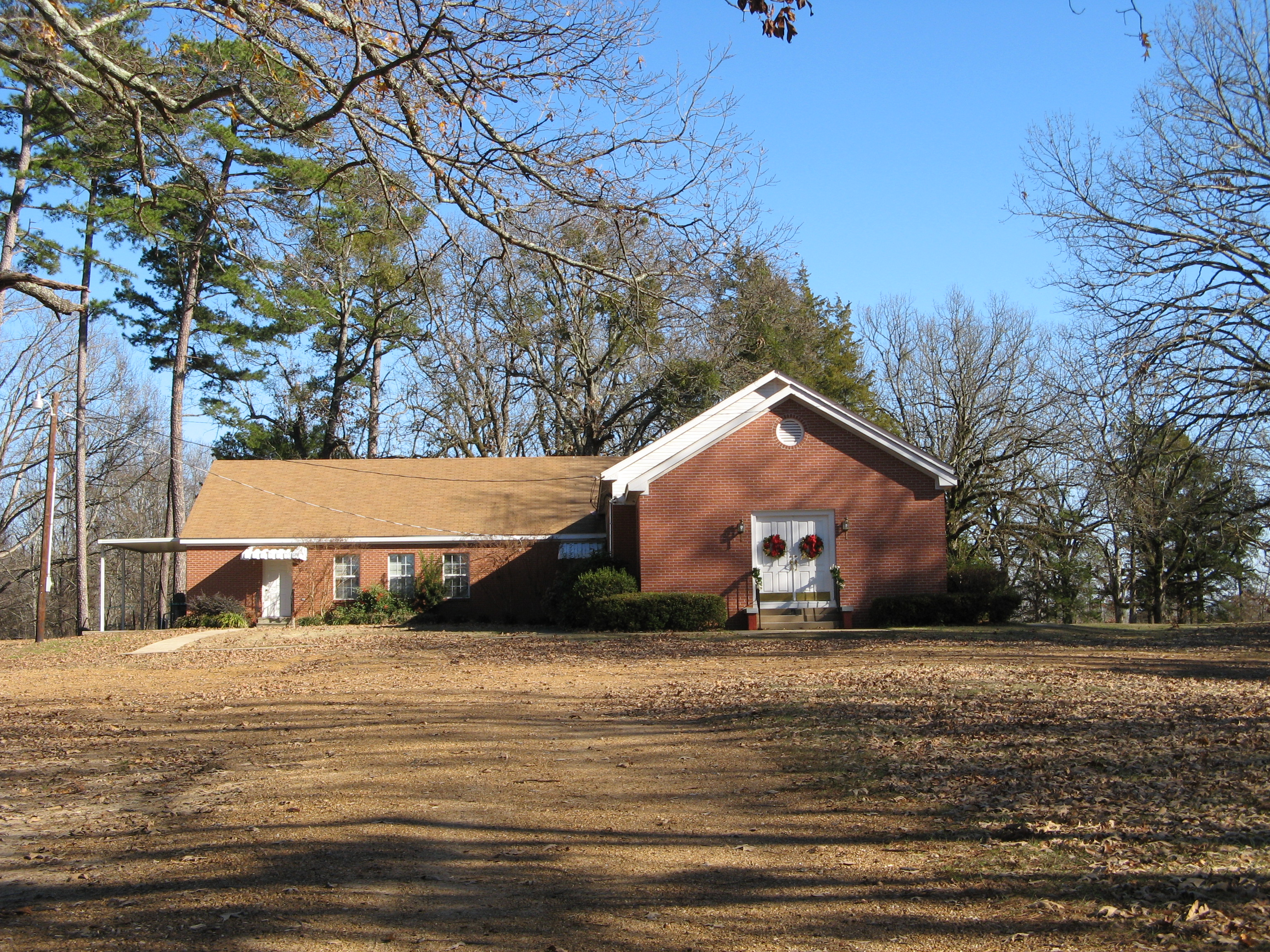
- Oregon Church is located in Oregon

- Location within the state of Mississippi Oregon (the United States)
- Coordinates: 33°08′38″N 90°06′48″W
- Country: United States
- State: Mississippi
- County: Holmes
- Elevation: 318 ft (97 m)
- Time zone: UTC-6 (Central (CST))
  - Summer (DST): UTC-5 (CDT)
- GNIS feature ID: 706669

Oregon is an unincorporated community in Holmes County, Mississippi, United States.

Oregon Church and Cemetery are located there.
