= Gwin, Mississippi =

- Unincorporated community
- Location within Mississippi Location within the United States
- Coordinates: 33°10′25″N 90°13′24″W
- Country: United States
- State: Mississippi
- County: Holmes
- Elevation: 115 ft (35 m)
- Time zone: UTC-6 (Central (CST))
  - Summer (DST): UTC-5 (CDT)
- ZIP code: 39169
- Area code: 662
- GNIS feature ID

Gwin is an unincorporated community located in Holmes County, Mississippi. Gwin is located on U.S. Highway 49E, south of Tchula.

The town was once an important station on the Illinois Central Railroad.

== Railway history ==
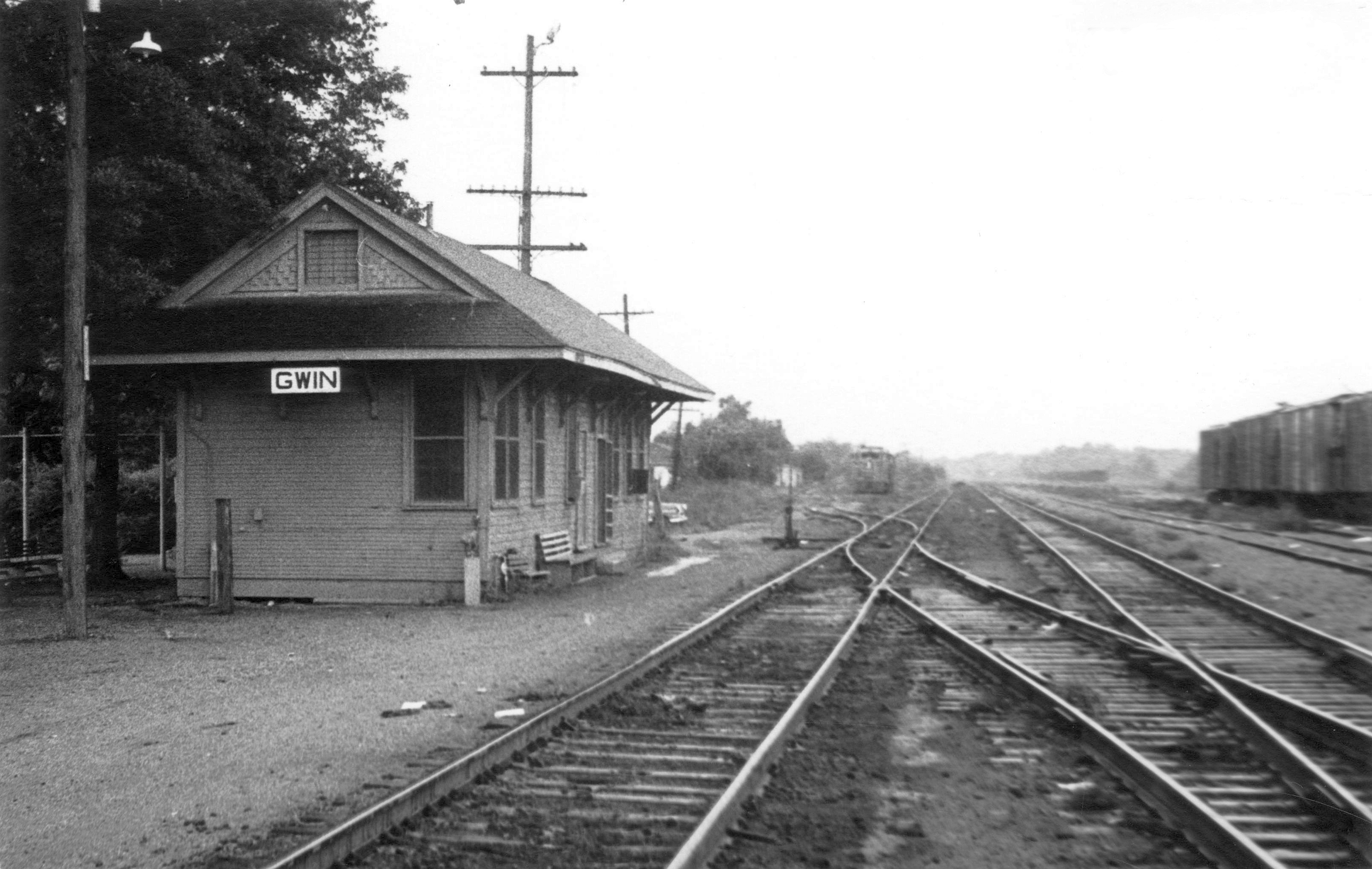
Train depot in Gwin, 1975

Gwin was the crew change point for all freight trains traveling between New Orleans and Memphis, and a hotel for train crews was located there. South of the town was a switching yard with six tracks, as well as a wye-junction where the track branched into a line which traveled east to Durant. Before electrical refrigeration was available for railcars, a large icing facility was located in Gwin, where ice was loading onto trains carrying perishable goods. In 1986, the railway moved its crew change point to McComb.
