= Franklin, Mississippi =

- Unincorporated community
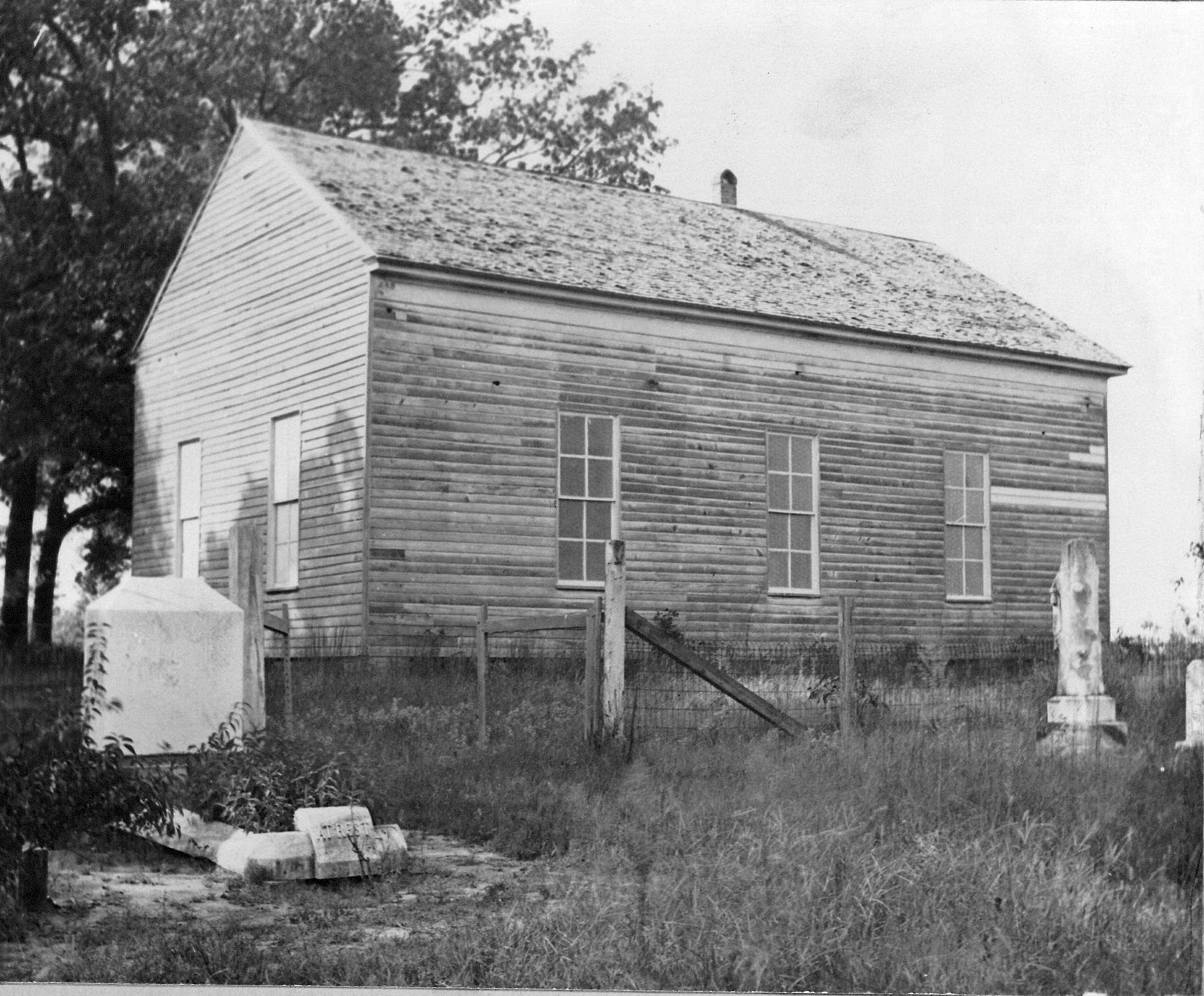
- Franklin Church, built 1841

- Location within Mississippi Location within the United States
- Coordinates: 33°02′09″N 90°00′07″W
- Country: United States
- State: Mississippi
- County: Holmes
- Elevation: 331 ft (101 m)
- Time zone: UTC-6 (Central (CST))
  - Summer (DST): UTC-5 (CDT)
- ZIP code: 39095
- Area code: 662
- GNIS feature ID: 670157

Franklin is an unincorporated community located in Holmes County, Mississippi. Mississippi Highway 17 passes through Franklin, which is approximately 7 miles (11 km) south of Lexington, the county seat, and approximately 12 miles (19 km) north of the town of Pickens.

This was long an area of cotton plantations. In the antebellum era, labor was provided by thousands of enslaved African Americans. After the war, many freedmen continued to work the land as sharecroppers and tenant farmers.

== History ==
Franklin was an early place of European-American settlement and developing cotton plantations from the 1830s, when most of the Choctaw people were removed to Indian Territory west of the Mississippi River. The American migrants were mostly from planter families in South Carolina and Virginia, and brought numerous slaves with them. Others they bought through the domestic slave trade to develop their extensive lands for cotton plantations.

Located a short distance east of the settlement is the Franklin Church and Cemetery. Erected in 1841 from labor by enslaved African Americans, the church had two front entrances, one for men and one for women.

On January 2, 1865, during the Civil War, this was a battlefield in an engagement involving 3,300 Federal mounted troops and 1,100 Confederate Home Guards led by General William Wirt Adams. The Union Army won this battle and took numerous prisoners. The Franklin Presbyterian Church is still in use; its congregation has decided to keep the cannonball holes from the Civil War left visible as a reminder of its history.

In 1900 the white population was 80, and the settlement had a post office in the early 1900s.

A post office operated under the name Franklin from 1831 to 1906.
