= Montgomery, Mississippi =

- Unincorporated community
- Location within Mississippi Location within the United States
- Coordinates: 33°17′50″N 90°19′36″W
- Country: United States
- State: Mississippi
- County: Holmes
- Elevation: 115 ft (35 m)
- Time zone: UTC-6 (Central (CST))
  - Summer (DST): UTC-5 (CDT)
- ZIP code: 38924
- Area code: 662
- GNIS feature ID: 673739

Montgomery is an unincorporated community located in Holmes County, Mississippi and is approximately 3 miles (4.8 km) west of Cruger. Montgomery was incorporated in 1836 and lost that status at an unknown date.
