= Quofaloma, Mississippi =

- Unincorporated community
- Location within Mississippi Location within the United States
- Coordinates: 33°06′17″N 90°20′46″W
- Country: United States
- State: Mississippi
- County: Holmes
- Elevation: 112 ft (34 m)
- Time zone: UTC-6 (Central (CST))
  - Summer (DST): UTC-5 (CDT)
- Area code: 662
- GNIS feature ID: 676443

Quofaloma is an unincorporated community in Holmes County, in the U.S. state of Mississippi.

== History ==
Quofaloma is a name derived from the Choctaw language purported to mean either "panther branch" or "quail cover". A variant name is "Quofaloma Plantation".
