= Eulogy, Mississippi =

- Unincorporated community
- Location within Mississippi Location within the United States
- Coordinates: 33°02′01″N 90°10′29″W
- Country: United States
- State: Mississippi
- County: Holmes
- Elevation: 305 ft (93 m)
- Time zone: UTC-6 (Central (CST))
  - Summer (DST): UTC-5 (CDT)
- GNIS feature ID: 691848

Eulogy is an unincorporated community located in Holmes County, Mississippi, United States.

In 1900, Eulogy had a post office, and a population of 37. The post office was operating from 1849 to 1909. Popular Springs Church was located here.
