= Owens Wells, Mississippi =

- Unincorporated community
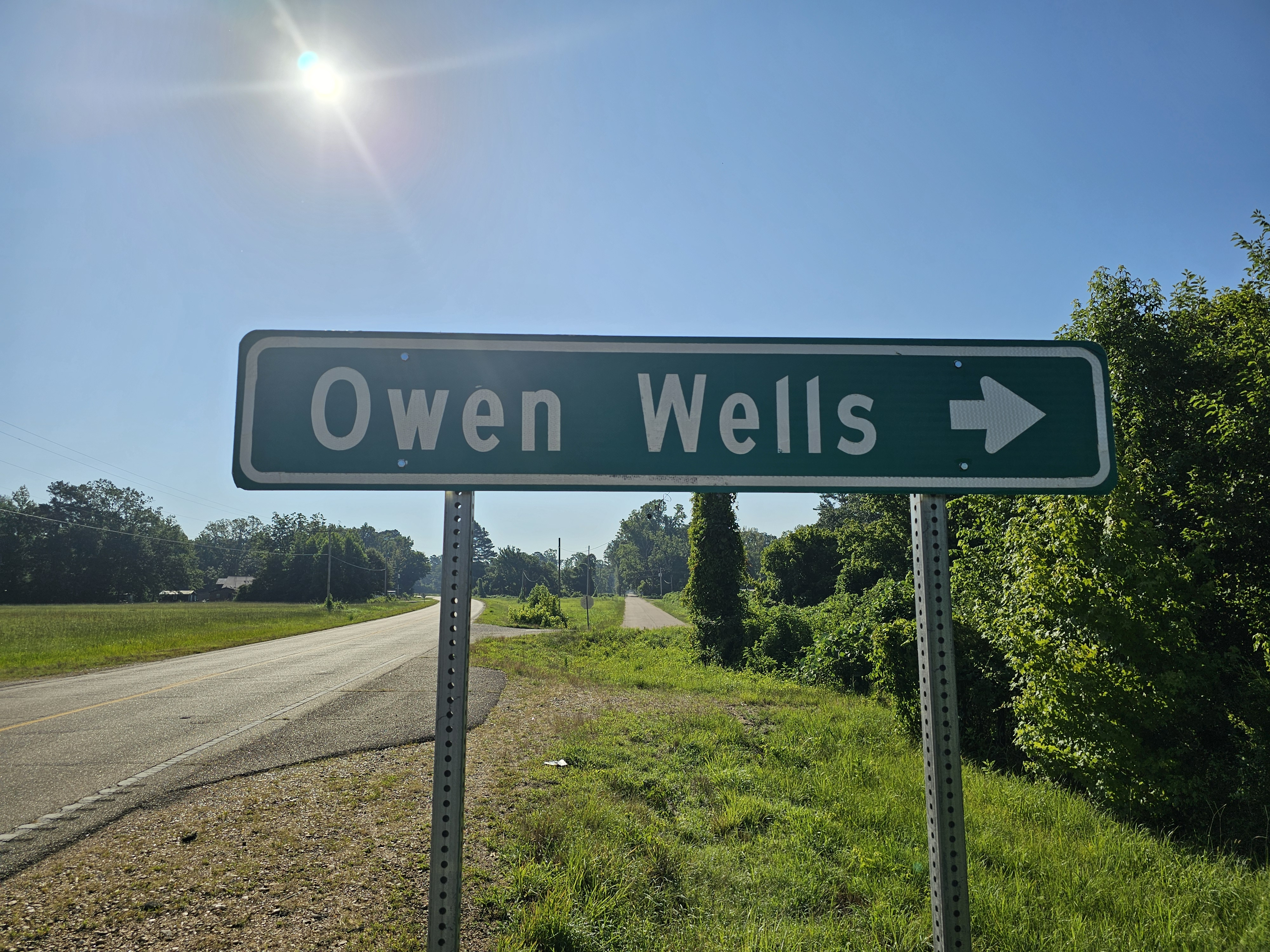
- Highway Sign outside of Owen Wells

- Location within Mississippi Location within the United States
- Coordinates: 33°05′42″N 89°58′04″W
- Country: United States
- State: Mississippi
- County: Holmes
- Elevation: 292 ft (89 m)
- Time zone: UTC-6 (Central (CST))
  - Summer (DST): UTC-5 (CDT)
- ZIP code: 39095
- Area code: 662
- GNIS feature ID: 675353

Owens Wells is an unincorporated community in Holmes County, Mississippi, United States. Owens Wells is located near Mississippi Highway 12 and is approximately 6 miles (9.7 km) east of Lexington and approximately 8 miles (13 km) west of Durant. The community was once a stop on the Yazoo and Mississippi Valley Railroad.

== History ==
Owens Wells was once home to a mineral spring and resort. A hotel was built near the spring that was frequented by citizens of the Delta. The resort could accommodate up to 150 guests and the springs were purported to cure "torpid liver, malaria, chills and fever, indigestion, dyspepsia, biliousness, general debility, constipation, all forms of kidney trouble...and piles." The spring was still producing usable mineral water in 1915.

A post office operated under the name Owens Wells from 1889 to 1919.

In 1910, Governor Edmond Noel gave a speech in Owens Wells that summarized his tenure as governor until that point.

== Gallery ==
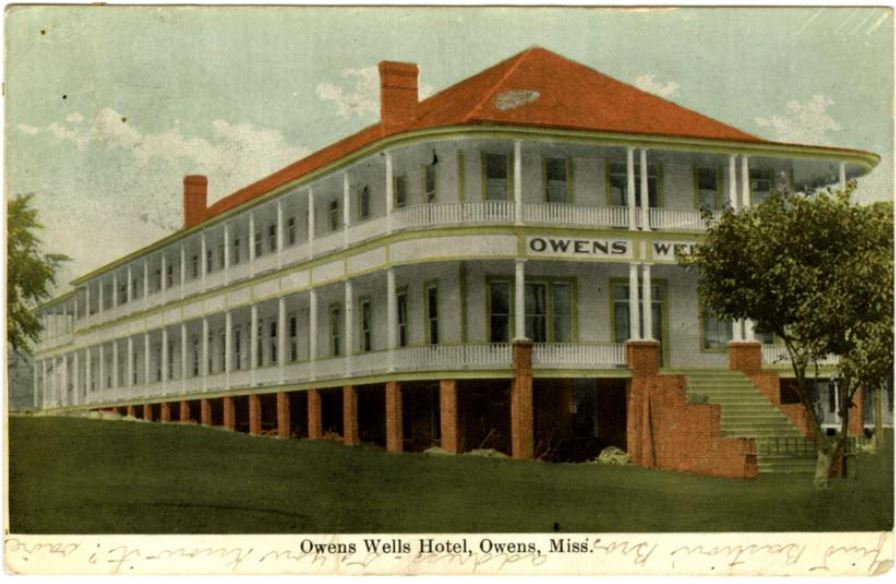
Owens Wells Hotel circa 1920

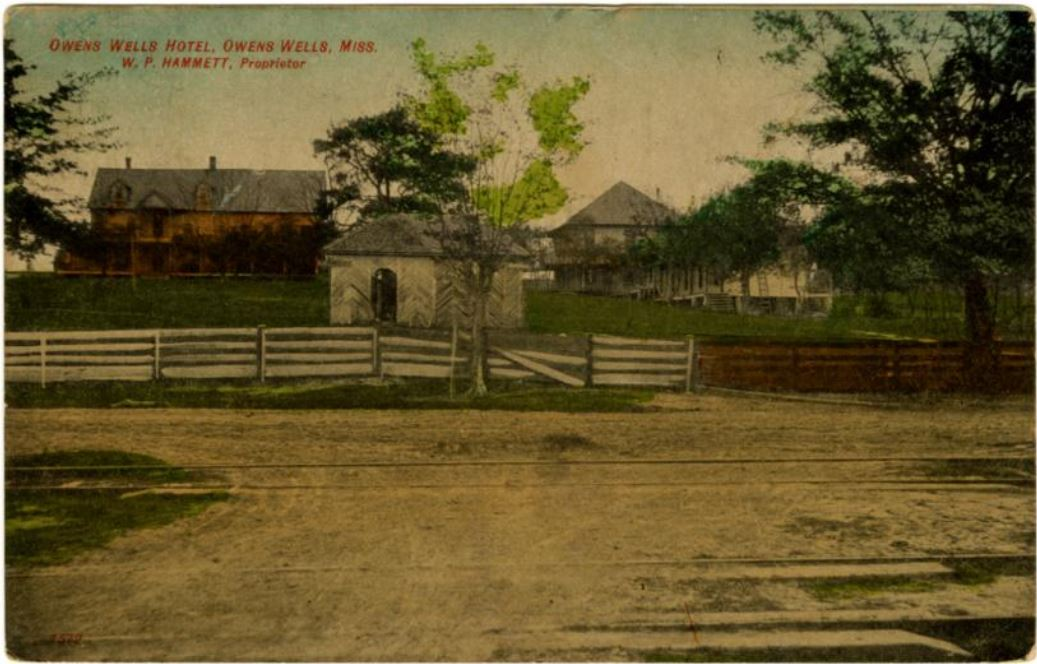
Panorama of Owens Wells Hotel

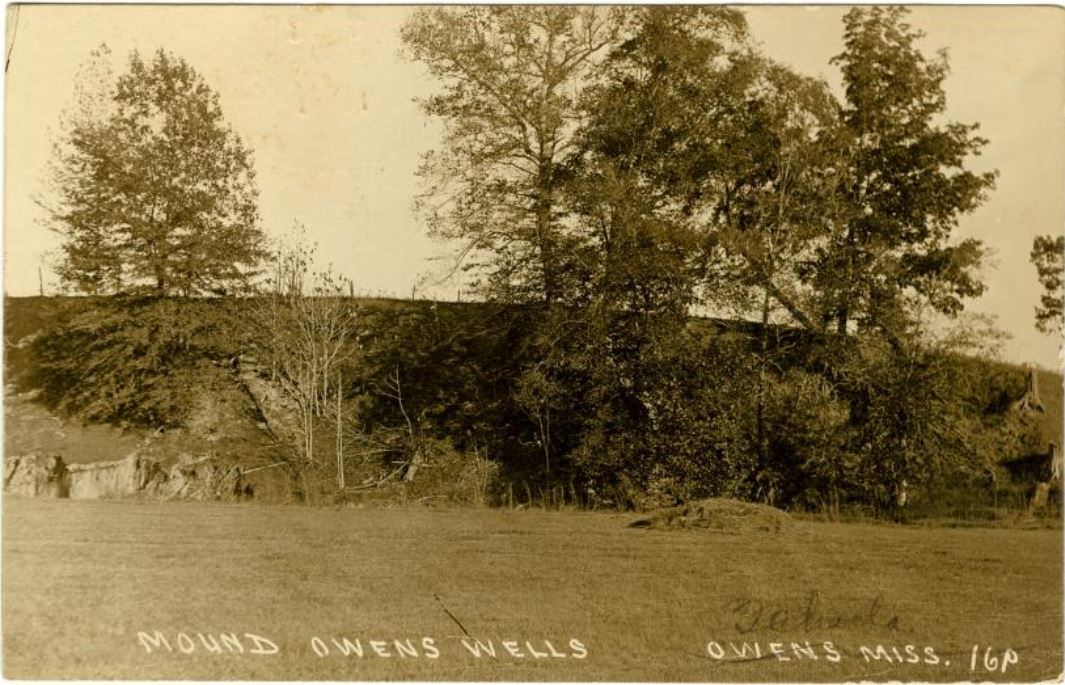
Native American mound at Owens Wells
