= Egypt, Holmes County, Mississippi =

- Unincorporated community
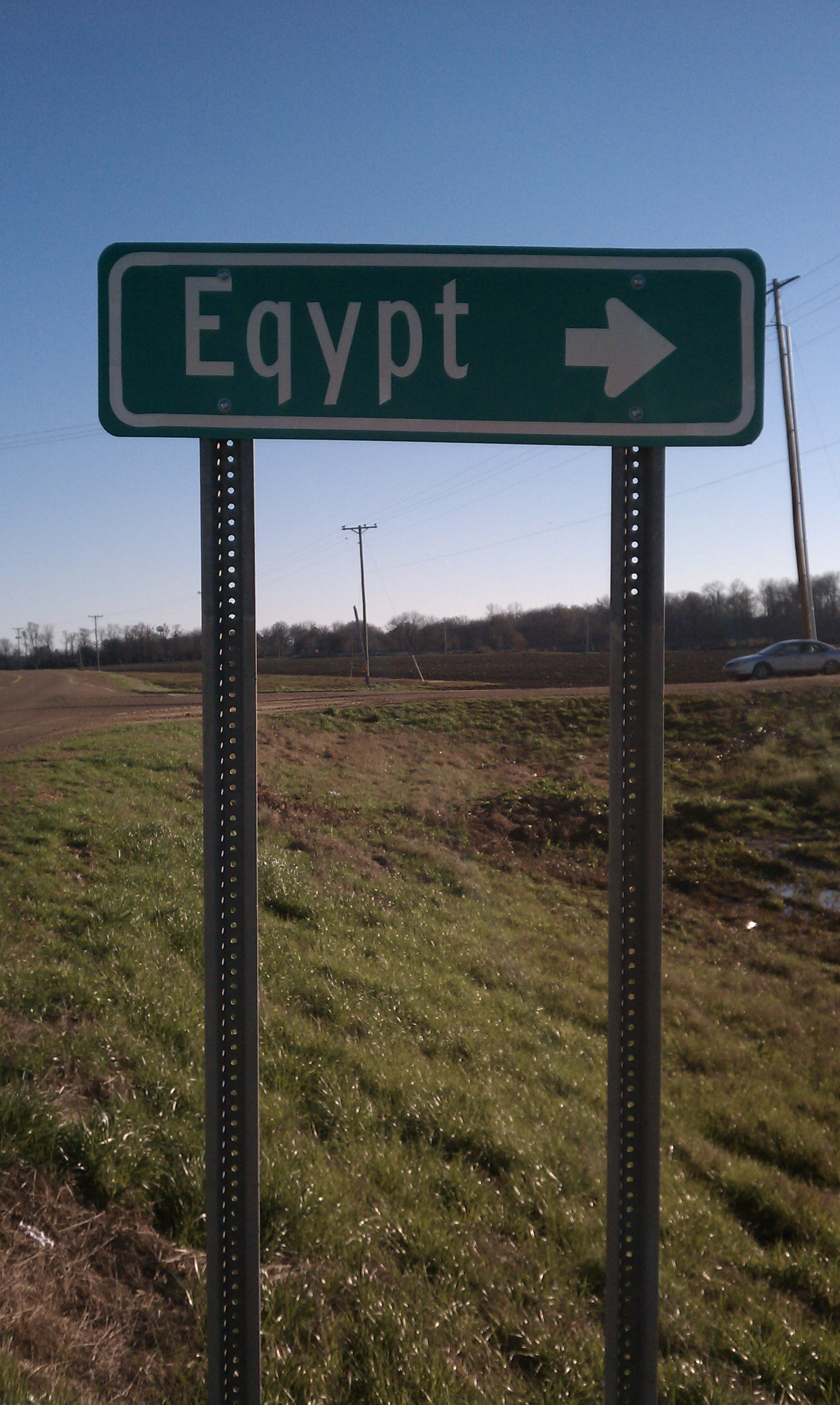
- Highway Sign outside of Egypt

- Location within Mississippi Location within the United States
- Coordinates: 33°20′28″N 90°16′38″W
- Country: United States
- State: Mississippi
- County: Holmes
- Elevation: 118 ft (36 m)
- Time zone: UTC-6 (Central (CST))
  - Summer (DST): UTC-5 (CDT)
- ZIP code: 38924
- Area code: 662
- GNIS feature ID: 669699

Egypt is an unincorporated community located in northern Holmes County, Mississippi, United States. Egypt is approximately 3 miles (4.8 km) northwest of Cruger and approximately 7 miles (11 km) southwest of Sidon.
