= Good Hope, Holmes County, Mississippi =

- Unincorporated community
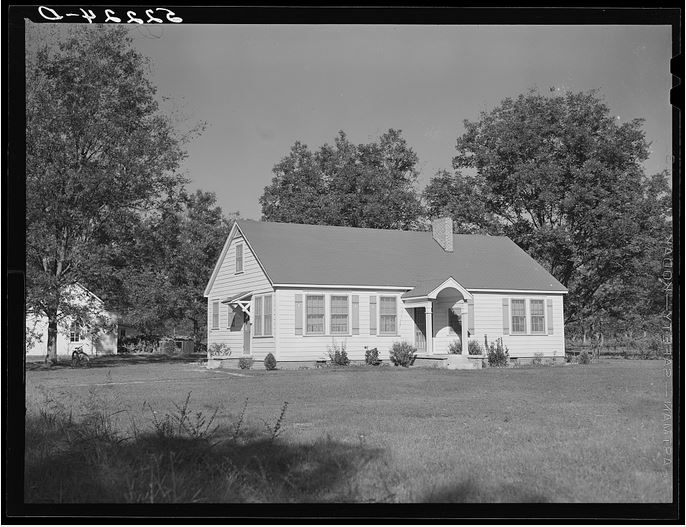
- Plantation manager's home at Good Hope in October 1939

- Location within Mississippi Location within the United States
- Coordinates: 33°06′06″N 90°18′01″W
- Country: United States
- State: Mississippi
- County: Holmes
- Elevation: 112 ft (34 m)
- Time zone: UTC-6 (Central (CST))
  - Summer (DST): UTC-5 (CDT)
- Area code: 662
- GNIS feature ID: 670463

Good Hope is an unincorporated community in Holmes County, Mississippi, United States. Good Hope is located on U.S. Route 49E, 7.2 miles (11.6 km) southwest of Tchula.

== History ==
Good Hope is named for the Good Hope plantation. Colonel William R. Miles, who commanded Miles' Legion at the Siege of Port Hudson and the Battle of Plains Store, lived on the Good Hope plantation.

Good Hope is located on the Canadian National Railway.

A post office operated under the name Good Hope from 1910 to 1916.

Marion Post Wolcott documented people and scenes from the Good Hope plantation in October 1939 as part of her work with the Farm Security Administration.
