= Howard, Mississippi =

- Unincorporated community
- Location within Mississippi Location within the United States
- Coordinates: 33°07′22″N 90°11′27″W
- Country: United States
- State: Mississippi
- County: Holmes
- Elevation: 115 ft (35 m)
- Time zone: UTC-6 (Central (CST))
  - Summer (DST): UTC-5 (CDT)
- ZIP code: 39169
- Area code: 662
- GNIS feature ID: 671524

Howard is an unincorporated community located in Holmes County, Mississippi and is approximately 5 miles (8.0 km) south of Tchula. The community was once a stop on the Yazoo and Mississippi Valley Railroad. Howard was incorporated in 1888 but lost that status at an unknown date. A post office operated under the name Howard from 1887 to 1920.
