= Coxburg, Mississippi =

- Unincorporated community
- Location within Mississippi Location within the United States
- Coordinates: 32°59′54″N 90°12′36″W
- Country: United States
- State: Mississippi
- County: Holmes
- Elevation: 341 ft (104 m)
- Time zone: UTC-6 (Central (CST))
  - Summer (DST): UTC-5 (CDT)
- ZIP code: 39095
- Area code: 662
- GNIS feature ID: 691789

Coxburg is an unincorporated community located in Holmes County, Mississippi. Coxburg is approximately 5 miles (8.0 km) east of Eden and approximately 4 miles (6.4 km) south of Tolarville.

== History ==
Coxburg is named for the Cox family, who settled in the area prior to 1869. The community was once home to two churches and a general store.

A post office operated under the name Coxburg from 1884 to 1908.

The Coxburg Consolidated School was once the largest school in Holmes County. The original building was constructed in 1932 and burned in 1935. Senator Pat Harrison helped to obtain Public Works Administration funding for a second Coxburg school that was constructed in 1936. A fire again destroyed the school in 1959.
