= Holmes County, Mississippi =

County in Mississippi, United States

- County
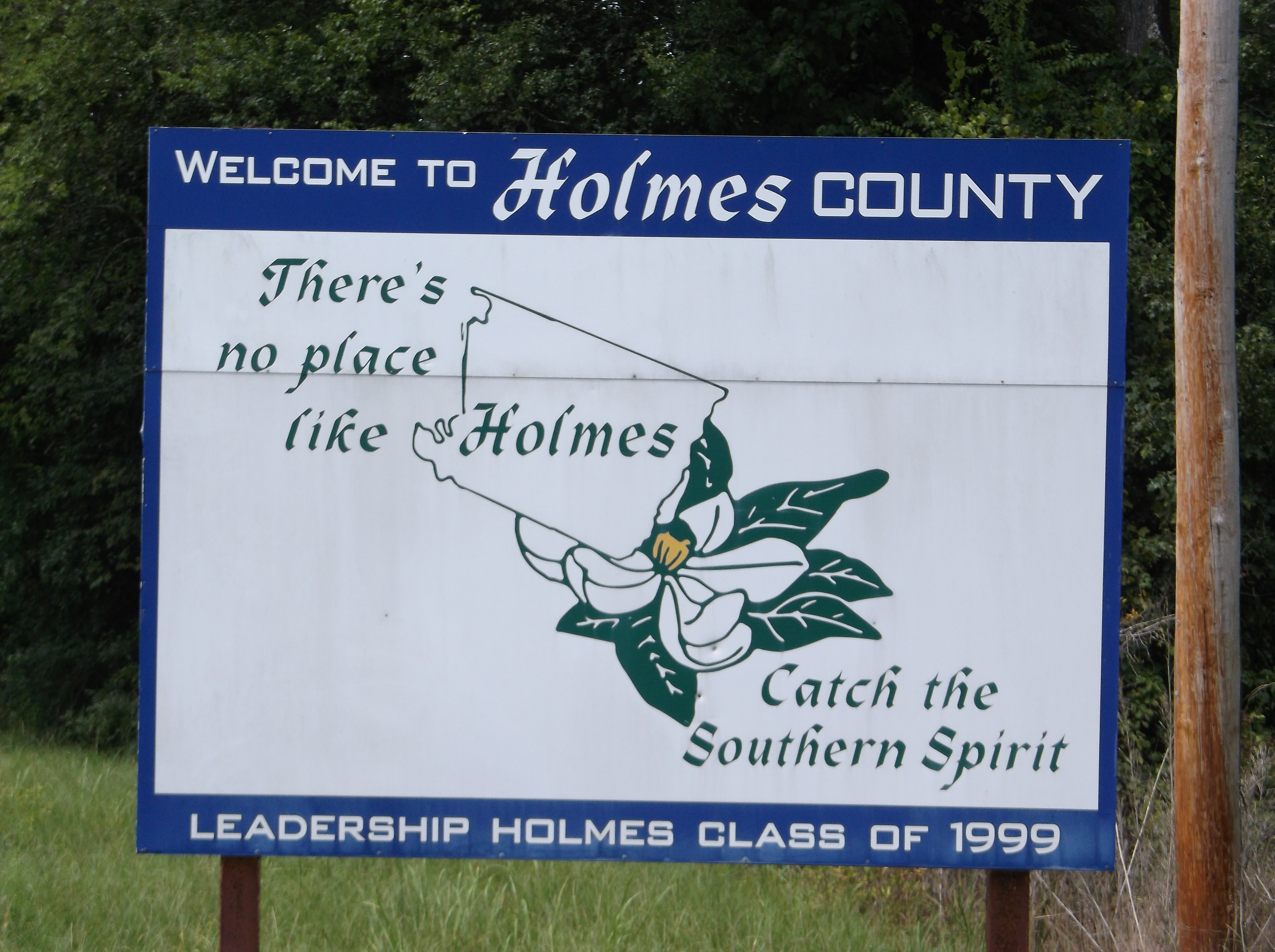

- Location within the U.S. state of Mississippi
- Coordinates: 33°07′N 90°05′W
- Country: United States
- State: Mississippi
- Founded: 1833
- Named for: David Holmes
- Seat: Lexington
- Largest city: Durant

Area
  - Total: 765 sq mi (1,980 km^{2})
  - Land: 757 sq mi (1,960 km^{2})
  - Water: 7.9 sq mi (20 km^{2}) 1.0%

Population (2020)
  - Total: 17,000
  - Estimate (2025): 15,465 ▼
  - Density: 22/sq mi (8.7/km^{2})
- Time zone: UTC−6 (Central)
  - Summer (DST): UTC−5 (CDT)
- Congressional district: 2nd
- Website: holmescountyms.org

Holmes County is a county in the U.S. state of Mississippi; its western border is formed by the Yazoo River and the eastern border by the Big Black River. The western part of the county is within the Yazoo-Mississippi Delta. As of the 2020 census, the population was 17,000. Its county seat is Lexington. The county is named in honor of David Holmes, territorial governor and the first governor of the state of Mississippi and later United States Senator for Mississippi. Holmes County native, Edmond Favor Noel, was an attorney and state politician, elected as governor of Mississippi, serving from 1908 to 1912.

Cotton was long the commodity crop; before the Civil War, its cultivation was based on slave labor and the majority of the population consisted of enslaved African Americans. Planters generally developed their properties along the riverfronts. After the war, many freedmen acquired land in the bottomlands of the Delta by clearing and selling timber to raise the purchase price, but most lost their land during difficult financial times at the end of the century, becoming tenant farmers or sharecroppers. With an economy based on agriculture, the county had steep population declines from 1940 to 1970, due to mechanization of farm labor, and the second wave of the Great Migration. African Americans migrated from the Deep South especially to West Coast cities, where jobs were plentiful in the buildup of the defense industry.

Some African Americans had reacquired land in Holmes County in the 1940s under New Deal programs. By 1960, Holmes County's 800 independent black farmers owned 50% of the land, a higher number of such farmers than elsewhere in the state. They were integral members of the Civil Rights Movement during the 1960s. In 1967, eight of ten black candidates to run for local county office were landowning farmers; they were the first African Americans to run for office in the county since Reconstruction. Holmes had more candidates running for offices for the Freedom Democratic Party than did any other county.

Robert G. Clark, Jr., a teacher in Holmes County, was elected as state representative in 1967, the first black person to be elected to state government in the 20th century. He served as the only African American in the state house until 1976. He continued to be re-elected to the state legislature from Holmes County until 2003. In the late 20th century, he was elected to the first of three terms as Speaker of the state House.

== History ==
The western border of the county is formed by the Yazoo River; it is next to the Mississippi Delta, and shares its characteristics. The eastern border is formed by the Big Black River and the eastern part has hills. The county was developed for cotton plantations in the antebellum era before the American Civil War, with most properties of the period located along the riverfronts for transportation access. Due to the plantation economy and reliance on slave labor, the county was majority black before the Civil War. It has continued to be majority black (see Demographics). Because of these characteristics, it is included among the 200 counties defined as part of the Black Belt region that curves across the South, into Texas.

"According to U.S. Census data, the 1860 Holmes County population included 5,806 whites, 10 "free colored" and 11,975 slaves. By the 1870 census, the white population had increased about 6% to 6,145, and the "colored" population had increased about 10% to 13,225." After the war, many freedmen and white migrants went to Holmes County and other parts of the Mississippi Delta, where they developed the bottomlands behind the riverfront properties, clearing and selling timber in order to buy their own lands. Workers were also attracted to the Delta area by higher than usual wages on the plantations, which had a labor shortage in the transition to a free labor economy.

By the turn of the 20th century, a majority of the landowners in the Delta counties were black. Effectively African-Americans were disenfranchised by the new constitution of 1890; the loss of political power added to their economic problems associated with the financial Panic of 1893. Unable to gain credit, many of the first generations of African-American landowners lost their properties by 1920. In this period, they were also competing for land with the better-funded timber and railroad companies. Afterward, African-Americans were forced to become sharecroppers or tenant farmers to make a living.

The period after Reconstruction and through the early 20th century had the highest incidence of white people lynching black people. Holmes County had 10 documented lynchings in the period from 1877 to 1950, most around the turn of the 20th century. Two lynchings took place in the county seat of Lexington, Mississippi in the 1940s.

White planters continued to recruit labor in the area, as freedmen wanted to work on their own account. The first Chinese immigrant laborers entered the Delta in the late 1870s. From 1900-1930, additional Chinese immigrants arrived in Mississippi, including some to Holmes County. They worked hard to leave field labor and often became merchants, especially becoming grocers of small stores in the rural Delta towns. As their socioeconomic status changed, the Chinese Americans carved out a niche "between black and white", gaining admission to white schools for their children through court challenges. With the decline of small towns, most Chinese Americans moved to larger cities through the 20th century. In Mississippi, the number of ethnic Chinese has increased overall in the state through 2010, although it is still small in total - fewer than 5,000.

During the New Deal, the Roosevelt administration worked through the Farmers Home Administration to provide low-interest loans in order to increase black land ownership. They also established a co-op cotton gin to be used by farmers in the project. In Holmes County, numerous African-Americans became landowners in the 1930s and 1940s through this program. They were fiercely independent and later were among strong supporters of the Civil Rights Movement in the 1960s, even as white people kept a grip on economic and political power through banks, police and the county courthouse. Although there had been outmigration, the population of the county in 1960 was still 42% black.

The USDA Agricultural Stabilization and Conservation Service (ASCS) (established under another name in the 1930s) carried out its programs on a county-wide level. County boards were elected annually by farmers to work on local programs, and to make approval of loans to farmers and similar issues. Although African-Americans made up a large portion of landowners in Holmes County, they were disenfranchised from voting and excluded from participating on the board. They were generally deprived of potential benefits through this program, as part of the pattern of racial discrimination against them across the South.

Beginning in the World War II period, the population of Holmes County declined markedly from its peak of 1940; through 1970 thousands left, with most African-Americans going to the West Coast, Midwestern and Northeastern cities in the second wave of the Great Migration, taking jobs in the booming defense industry. From 1950 to 1960, for instance, some 6,000 black people left the county, a decline of nearly 19%. But in 1960 the county was still 72% black, with a total population of 27,100.

Even with these problems, in 1960 Holmes County had more independent black farmers than did any other county in the state: 800 black farmers owned 50% of the land in the county. They were among those who initiated the civil rights movement, particularly farmers of Mileston, where the soil was rich. They invited organizers of the Student Non-Violent Coordinating Committee (SNCC) to come to Mileston to help them take action. The majority of the first fourteen black people who attempted to register to vote on April 9, 1963, were landowners. Holmes County became the site of renewed organizing of grassroots efforts for African-American civil rights, with people designated as responsible for its Beats and precincts.

In 1954, the White Citizens Council was established to expressly to oppose desegregation of public schools after the United States Supreme Court ruling that year in Brown v. Board of Education, finding segregation to be unconstitutional. They raised funds to support whites-only schools, and conducted economic boycotts of blacks suspected of civil rights activism, as well as social and political pressure against whites who crossed them. Among their targets in the latter category was Hazel Brannon Smith, publisher and editor of two local papers in Lexington. For three years, her customers resisted the council's effort to boycott her and cut out her advertising; the Council started a rival newspaper to try to take away her business. Opponents arranged for her husband to be fired from his job as county hospital administrator, and a group firebombed two of her papers. She received a Pulitzer Prize for journalism in 1964 for her editorials about the civil rights movement during this period.

The Freedom Democratic Party was organized in 1964 to work on black voter registration and education, and continued after passage of civil rights laws, in order to implement such laws. For instance, where white Democratic Party officials had defined the very large Lexington precinct, which held the majority of population, the county chapter of the FDP organized its own sub-precincts within it in order to communicate better with the community. The Civil Rights Act of 1964 and the Voting Rights Act of 1965 were important but had to be implemented on the local level, where resistance to black voting continued to be strong, sometimes becoming violent.

The FDP worked with residents to register African-American voters and encourage them to vote. As resistance continued by white officials, in November 1965 a federal registrar was assigned to Holmes County, based on residents' petitions about the circuit clerk's discrimination over a 4-month period. After this, 2,000 black voters were registered in two months.

The FDP also worked with local people to run for positions on the ASCS board. In the fall of 1965, six black farmers were elected to the county board, with four as alternates. This gave them a voice in determining how local programs would run. But discrimination in USDA programs continued and was widespread, as shown by a late 20th-century national class-action suit, Pigford v. Glickman, which was settled in 1999. Payments to members of the class affected continued into the 21st century.

In 1966 many communities in the county concentrated on setting up the new federal Head Start program for young children. The FDP continued to work with other communities on correcting unfair hiring at factories and unequal administration of welfare, as well as trying to end discrimination at eating places. From 1966 on, the FDP registered an increasing number of black voters and gained their participation in elections. By November 1967, nearly 6,000 new voters were registered in the county.

In 1967 black farmers and landowners, who had been part of the Movement since the early 1960s, accounted for eight of the ten candidates who ran for local and state offices: Thomas C. "Top Cat" Johnson, Ed Noel McGaw, Jr.; Ward Montgomery; John Malone; Willie James Burns; John Daniel Wesley; Griffin McLaurin, and Ralthus Hayes. McLaurin was elected as constable of one of the beats in the county.

Robert G. Clark Jr. (1928-2025) and Robert Smith, both teachers, had joined the Movement in 1966 and ran for state representative and county sheriff, respectively. Clark was a member of a landowning family in Ebenezer; he had a master's degree and had nearly finished his PhD from Michigan State University. He won a seat as the first and only black elected in 1967 to the Mississippi House of Representatives. By 2000, Clark had been re-elected to eight four-year terms in the state house and had been elected as Speaker three times since 1992. It was not until 1976 that another African American was elected to the state legislature, but then the number increased. Several blacks were elected to local offices in Holmes County well before that.

White people have also left the county since the mid-20th century because of declining work opportunities. Agribusinesses have bought up large tracts of land, and the number of independent farmers has declined markedly. By 2010, the total population was less than half that of 1940. Still largely rural, Holmes County in the 21st century has had problems associated with poverty and limited access to healthcare; as of 2011 it had the lowest life expectancy of any county in the United States, for both men and women.

In mid-2025, press reports indicted that Holmes County is the most obese county in the country. Over half the residents are obese. Almost twenty percent of adults are diabetic. Median household income in Holmes County is the lowest of any county with a population of more than 10,000.

== Geography ==
According to the U.S. Census Bureau, the county has a total area of 765 square miles (1,980 km^{2}), of which 757 square miles (1,960 km^{2}) is land and 7.9 square miles (20 km^{2}) (1.0%) is water.

=== Major highways ===
- Interstate 55
- U.S. Route 49
- U.S. Route 51
- Mississippi Highway 12
- Mississippi Highway 14
- Mississippi Highway 17
- Mississippi Highway 19

=== Adjacent counties ===
- Carroll County (north)
- Attala County (east)
- Yazoo County (south)
- Humphreys County (west)
- Leflore County (northwest)

=== National protected areas ===
- Hillside National Wildlife Refuge (part)
- Mathews Brake National Wildlife Refuge (part)
- Morgan Brake National Wildlife Refuge
- Theodore Roosevelt National Wildlife Refuge (part)

== Demographics ==
Historical population
Census	Pop.	Note	%±
1840	9,452		—
1850	13,928		47.4%
1860	17,791		27.7%
1870	19,370		8.9%
1880	27,164		40.2%
1890	30,970		14.0%
1900	36,828		18.9%
1910	39,088		6.1%
1920	34,513		−11.7%
1930	38,534		11.7%
1940	39,710		3.1%
1950	33,301		−16.1%
1960	27,096		−18.6%
1970	23,120		−14.7%
1980	22,970		−0.6%
1990	21,604		−5.9%
2000	21,609		0.0%
2010	19,198		−11.2%
2020	17,000		−11.4%
2025 (est.)	15,465	▼	−9.0%
U.S. Decennial Census; 1790-1960 1900-1990; 1990-2000 2010-2013

From 1940 until 1970, the county had major declines in population as many African Americans left the state in the Great Migration. Whites have also left as economic opportunities were limited in the rural county.

=== Racial and ethnic composition ===
Holmes County, Mississippi – Racial and ethnic composition Note: the US Census treats Hispanic/Latino as an ethnic category. This table excludes Latinos from the racial categories and assigns them to a separate category. Hispanics/Latinos may be of any race.
Race / Ethnicity (NH = Non-Hispanic)	Pop 1980	Pop 1990	Pop 2000	Pop 2010	Pop 2020	% 1980	% 1990	% 2000	% 2010	% 2020
White alone (NH)	6,556	5,161	4,395	2,993	2,359	28.54%	23.89%	20.34%	15.59%	13.88%
Black or African American alone (NH)	16,058	16,336	16,850	15,925	14,194	69.91%	75.62%	77.98%	82.95%	83.49%
Native American or Alaska Native alone (NH)	4	13	24	18	36	0.02%	0.06%	0.11%	0.09%	0.21%
Asian alone (NH)	41	31	32	30	20	0.18%	0.14%	0.15%	0.16%	0.12%
Native Hawaiian or Pacific Islander alone (NH)	x	x	0	1	0	x	x	0.00%	0.01%	0.00%
Other race alone (NH)	5	1	3	6	14	0.02%	0.00%	0.01%	0.03%	0.08%
Mixed race or Multiracial (NH)	x	x	111	91	265	x	x	0.51%	0.47%	1.56%
Hispanic or Latino (any race)	306	62	194	134	112	1.33%	0.29%	0.90%	0.70%	0.66%
Total	22,970	21,604	21,609	19,198	17,000	100.00%	100.00%	100.00%	100.00%	100.00%

=== 2020 census ===
As of the 2020 census, the county had a population of 17,000. The median age was 38.6 years. 23.6% of residents were under the age of 18 and 16.6% of residents were 65 years of age or older. For every 100 females there were 93.2 males, and for every 100 females age 18 and over there were 90.4 males age 18 and over.

The racial makeup of the county was 14.0% White, 83.9% Black or African American, 0.2% American Indian and Alaska Native, 0.1% Asian, <0.1% Native Hawaiian and Pacific Islander, 0.2% from some other race, and 1.6% from two or more races. Hispanic or Latino residents of any race comprised 0.7% of the population.

<0.1% of residents lived in urban areas, while 100.0% lived in rural areas.

There were 6,526 households in the county, of which 31.4% had children under the age of 18 living in them. Of all households, 24.0% were married-couple households, 24.2% were households with a male householder and no spouse or partner present, and 45.8% were households with a female householder and no spouse or partner present. About 34.3% of all households were made up of individuals and 14.9% had someone living alone who was 65 years of age or older.

There were 7,485 housing units, of which 12.8% were vacant. Among occupied housing units, 67.0% were owner-occupied and 33.0% were renter-occupied. The homeowner vacancy rate was 0.9% and the rental vacancy rate was 7.1%.

=== 2010 census ===
As of the 2010 United States census, there were 19,198 people living in the county, less than half than at the peak of population in 1940. 83.4% were Black or African American, 15.6% White, 0.2% Asian, 0.1% Native American, 0.1% of some other race and 0.6% of two or more races. 0.7% were Hispanic or Latino (of any race).

=== 2000 census ===
As of the census of 2000, there were 21,609 people, 7,314 households, and 5,229 families living in the county. The population density was 29 people per square mile (11 people/km^{2}). There were 8,439 housing units at an average density of 11 units per square mile (4.2 units/km^{2}). The racial makeup of the county was 78.66% Black or African American, 20.47% White, 0.12% Native American, 0.15% Asian, 0.07% from other races, and 0.52% from two or more races. 0.90% of the population were Hispanic or Latino of any race.

According to the census of 2000, the largest ancestry groups that residents of Holmes County identified were African 78.66%, English 11.4%, and Scots-Irish 5%.

There were 2,314 households, out of which 11.00% had children under the age of 18 living with them, 24.10% were married couples living together, 21.20% had a female householder with no husband present, and 18.50% were non-families. 16.30% of all households were made up of individuals, and 12.10% had someone living alone who was 65 years of age or older. The average household size was 2.86 and the average family size was 3.48.

In the county, the population was spread out, with 32.10% under the age of 18, 12.40% from 18 to 24, 24.80% from 25 to 44, 18.30% from 45 to 64, and 12.40% who were 65 years of age or older. The median age was 30 years. For every 100 females there were 87.30 males. For every 100 females age 18 and over, there were 79.30 males.

The median income for a household in the county was $17,235, and the median income for a family was $21,757. Males had a median income of $23,720 versus $17,883 for females. The per capita income for the county was $10,683. About 35.90% of families and 41.10% of the population were below the poverty line, including 52.30% of those under age 18 and 36.40% of those age 65 or over.

Holmes County has the lowest per capita income in Mississippi and the 41st lowest in the United States.

== Politics ==
United States presidential election results for Holmes County, Mississippi
Year	Republican		Democratic		Third party(ies)	
Year	No.	%	No.	%	No.	%
1912	5	0.51%	936	95.32%	41	4.18%
1916	21	1.90%	1,070	96.83%	14	1.27%
1920	69	6.89%	917	91.61%	15	1.50%
1924	92	7.27%	1,173	92.73%	0	0.00%
1928	134	6.27%	2,004	93.73%	0	0.00%
1932	45	2.43%	1,799	97.14%	8	0.43%
1936	12	0.63%	1,885	99.37%	0	0.00%
1940	37	1.78%	2,041	98.22%	0	0.00%
1944	122	5.88%	1,954	94.12%	0	0.00%
1948	24	1.08%	61	2.74%	2,139	96.18%
1952	1,305	47.84%	1,423	52.16%	0	0.00%
1956	215	10.05%	872	40.77%	1,052	49.18%
1960	455	17.72%	628	24.46%	1,484	57.81%
1964	3,115	96.59%	110	3.41%	0	0.00%
1968	520	7.02%	3,881	52.38%	3,008	40.60%
1972	3,158	47.23%	3,459	51.73%	69	1.03%
1976	2,438	33.85%	4,616	64.08%	149	2.07%
1980	2,693	32.31%	5,463	65.54%	180	2.16%
1984	3,102	35.44%	5,641	64.45%	10	0.11%
1988	2,737	33.68%	5,350	65.84%	39	0.48%
1992	1,694	28.17%	4,092	68.04%	228	3.79%
1996	1,536	23.96%	4,720	73.62%	155	2.42%
2000	1,937	26.10%	5,447	73.39%	38	0.51%
2004	1,961	23.39%	6,366	75.94%	56	0.67%
2008	1,714	17.96%	7,765	81.37%	64	0.67%
2012	1,435	15.45%	7,812	84.11%	41	0.44%
2016	1,309	16.21%	6,689	82.83%	78	0.97%
2020	1,369	16.87%	6,588	81.18%	158	1.95%
2024	1,243	18.47%	5,420	80.53%	67	1.00%

During and following the Reconstruction era in the 19th century, African Americans had supported the Republican Party. It had achieved emancipation of slaves and granted freedmen full citizenship and constitutional rights through ratification of constitutional amendments. Following the effective disenfranchisement of blacks in 1890 by the state's new constitution with restrictions on voter registration, blacks were excluded from politics in Mississippi; other southern states repeated this model, so they were disenfranchised across the former Confederacy. However, the Republican Party retained influence through political appointments, and people struggled to control these within each southern state.

Perry Wilbon Howard (born in Ebenezer in 1877) was one of about two dozen African-American attorneys among the second generation of freedmen in the state. After passing the bar, he set up a practice in the capital of Jackson, Mississippi, where he worked for about fifteen years. Active in the Republican Party, he was a delegate to national conventions from 1912 to 1960, representing his constituents to the national party. Although he moved to Washington, DC, where he was partner in a prominent black law firm, Howard was elected as Republican National Committeeman from Mississippi in 1924. He retained control of this position (and patronage appointments) until 1960. He was appointed in 1923 to a national position in the Office of the Attorney General in the administration of Warren G. Harding, retaining it until resigning under President Herbert Hoover in 1928.

Since the civil rights years and gains of enforcement in voting rights in the late 1960s, most African-American voters, who constitute a large majority in the county, have voted strongly for Democratic candidates in Presidential and Congressional elections. The last Republican presidential candidate to win a majority in the county was Barry Goldwater in 1964, at a time when nearly all African Americans in the county and state were still disenfranchised by the state's constitution and discriminatory practices. In 2008, Democrat Barack Obama won 81 percent of the county's vote, as seen by the adjacent table.

Holmes is part of Mississippi's 2nd congressional district, which is represented by Democrat Bennie Thompson.

== Education ==
=== Colleges ===
- Holmes Community College (Goodman)

=== Elementary and secondary schools ===
During the segregation years, when black public schools were historically underfunded, Lexington in 1918 was the site for the founding of a private school for black students affiliated with the Church of God in Christ. It became known as Saints Academy. Arenia Mallory was hired as a young music teacher and later was selected as principal in 1926. She expanded the school to serve more students, ultimately with classes in grades 1–12. Conducting fund raising outside the state, she promoted a strong academic education with Christian discipline, and her school was nationally known. She led it until her death in 1977, ultimately establishing an associated junior college. The academy continued until 2006.

During the period of integration of public schools in Mississippi in the late 1960s, many white parents in the majority-black Delta enrolled their children in newly established private segregation academies, as they did in Holmes County. But statewide most white children remained in public schools. In Holmes County, blacks had become well-organized. But in other areas they lost control of their schools, with administrations often dominated by whites, resulting in new problems after integration.

==== Public Schooling ====
- Holmes County Consolidated School District
  - The Durant Public School District was separate until 2018

==== Private schooling ====
- Central Holmes Christian School (Lexington) (formerly Central Holmes Academy, founded as a segregation academy).
- Old Dominion Christian School
- Pillow Academy in unincorporated Leflore County, near Greenwood, enrolls some students from Holmes County. It originally was founded as a segregation academy.
- East Holmes Academy, A segregation academy that made national news in 1989 for offering to forfeit a game because the other school had a black player. Closed 2006.

== Media ==
The county newspaper is the Holmes County Herald. It was established in 1959 as the weekly paper of the county chapter of the White Citizens Council, founded to resist integration of public schools and the civil rights movement. Specifically it was founded to compete with The Lexington Advertiser, owned by local white publisher Hazel Brannon Smith, whose politics the White Citizens Council disliked. The Council arranged for Smith's husband to be fired from his job as county hospital administrator. Brannon Smith was eventually forced out of the business by white boycotts of her newspapers and the firebombing of one paper in Jackson, Mississippi.

The Herald published the names of African Americans who took action for civil rights in order to bring economic and political pressure against them. For instance, in April 1963 it published interviews and the names of 14 blacks who attempted to register to vote at the county courthouse in Lexington. The county circuit clerk published the names weekly of persons who tried to register to vote, thus identifying them for reprisals. Known or suspected activists were fired from jobs and evicted from rental housing as the Council tried to suppress the civil rights movement. The Herald was bought by an independent person in 1970.

== Communities ==
=== Cities ===
- Durant
- Lexington (county seat)

=== Towns ===
- Cruger
- Goodman
- Pickens
- Tchula
- West

=== Unincorporated communities ===
- Acona
- Brozville
- Coxburg
- Ebenezer
- Egypt
- Eulogy
- Franklin
- Good Hope
- Gwin
- Howard
- Ituma
- Marcella
- Mileston
- Montgomery
- Oregon
- Owens Wells
- Pluto
- Quofaloma
- Richland
- Thornton
- Tolarville

=== Ghost town ===
- Oswego

== Notable people ==
- Homer Casteel, politician and public servant; lieutenant governor 1920 to 1924; member of the Mississippi Public Service Commission from 1936 to 1952.
- Robert G. Clark, Jr., teacher, coach and politician; in 1967 he was elected to the state legislature as the first African-American member since Reconstruction; he was elected to eight consecutive four-year terms and as Speaker of the state House in 1992, 1996 and 2000.
- Steven Fonti, animator and storyboard artist, was born in Holmes County.
- Perry Wilbon Howard, attorney and Republican Party National Committeeman, was appointed to a national position in the Department of Justice under President Warren G. Harding, serving into Herbert Hoover's administration. He was the highest-ranking African American in government.
- Arenia Mallory, principal and president of Saints Academy. She had a more than 50-year career with this school, which she built into an academically successful, nationally known private school for black children during the segregation years, also expanding to a junior college. A leader in African-American women's national organizations, she served in the John F. Kennedy administration.
- Edmond Favor Noel, Governor of Mississippi, 1908–1912, was born to a planter family in Lexington. He became an attorney and politician, serving in the state house and then the state senate both before and after his tenure as governor. He improved education in the state.
- Edmond F. Noel Sr (1916-1986), physician, born in Holmes County and reared in Jackson, Mississippi, was a Howard University and Fisk University graduate, and a World War II veteran. Recruited to practice in Denver, Colorado in 1949, he was the first African-American physician in the city to be granted staff hospital privileges.
- Edmond "Eddie" F. Noel (1926-1990), was born and lived in Lexington. An African-American veteran of World War II, he killed three white men in January 1954, including a deputy sheriff, and evaded capture for three weeks, making national news. He was hunted by numerous men, dogs, and even observers in planes. He turned himself in to the court, and the judge ordered a mental evaluation. Noel was committed by the court to the state mental institution, where he was held for more than a decade. He was released in 1970 and lived his last 20 years with his family, who had migrated to Fort Wayne, Indiana.
- Hazel Brannon Smith, publisher and journalist, in 1935 purchased The Durant News and The Lexington Advertiser in Lexington; she published them for decades and was noted in the region for her fair coverage and later support of civil rights. She opposed the White Citizens Council, which conducted an advertising boycott against her papers. In 1964 she was the first woman to win a Pulitzer Prize for editorial writing, for her editorials on civil rights, the same year her paper in Jackson, The Northside Reporter, was firebombed. She was forced out of business.

== In popular culture ==
Carolyn Haines, an American mystery writer, sets many of her novels in Holmes County and other parts of the Mississippi Delta.

== See also ==
- National Register of Historic Places listings in Holmes County, Mississippi
- USS Holmes County (LST-836)
