= Acona, Mississippi =

- Unincorporated community
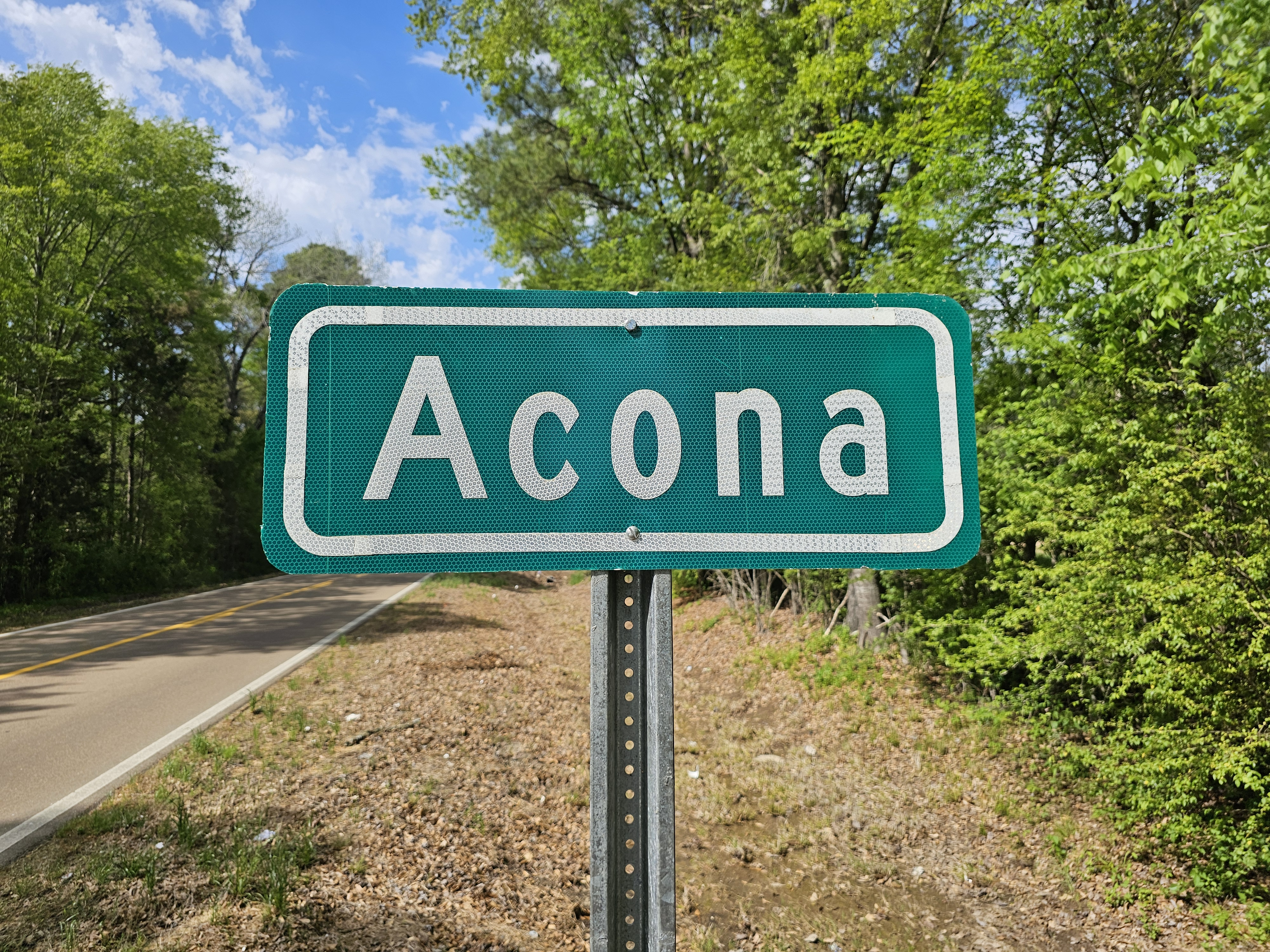
- Highway Sign in Acona

- Location within Mississippi Location within the United States
- Coordinates: 33°16′18″N 90°00′58″W
- Country: United States
- State: Mississippi
- County: Holmes
- Elevation: 354 ft (108 m)
- Time zone: UTC-6 (Central (CST))
  - Summer (DST): UTC-5 (CDT)
- ZIP code: 38923, 39095, 38924
- Area code: 662
- GNIS feature ID: 666139

Acona is an unincorporated community located in Holmes County, Mississippi. Acona is located on Mississippi Highway 17 and is approximately 12 miles (19 km) north of Lexington and approximately 4 miles (6.4 km) south of Black Hawk.

== History ==
Acona appears to be a name derived from the Choctaw language, but its meaning is uncertain. Some sources say Acona is derived from a Native American word of exclamation, similar to "whoa!" in English. A post office called Acona was established in 1852, and remained in operation until 1911. Acona was once home to a stage coach stop, tanyard, cotton gin, and millinery store.

The Acona Church, Cemetery, and School are listed on the National Register of Historic Places.
