= Thornton, Mississippi =

- Unincorporated community
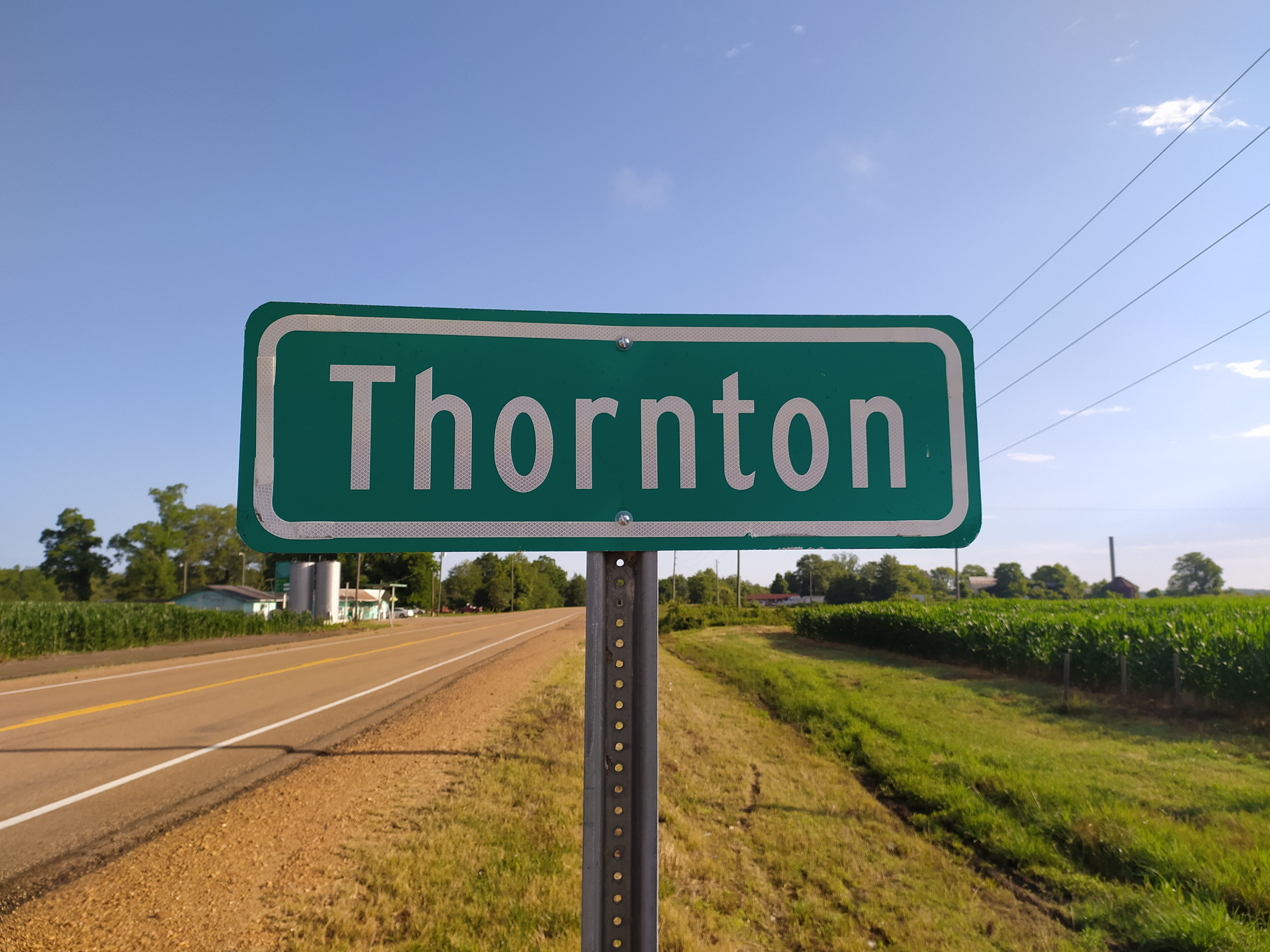
- Highway Sign outside of Thornton

- Location within Mississippi Location within the United States
- Coordinates: 33°04′45″N 90°19′21″W
- Country: United States
- State: Mississippi
- County: Holmes
- Elevation: 115 ft (35 m)
- Time zone: UTC-6 (Central (CST))
  - Summer (DST): UTC-5 (CDT)
- ZIP code: 39146
- Area code: 662
- GNIS feature ID

Thornton, Mississippi is an unincorporated community located in Holmes County, near the Yazoo River. U.S. Highway 49E runs through the community, which is approximately 7 miles (11 km) north of Eden and approximately 10 miles (16 km) south of Tchula.

== History ==
Thornton was incorporated in 1883 and named for Dr. C. C. Thornton, a local landowner.

Thornton is located on the Canadian National Railway.

A post office first began operation under the name Thornton in 1883.

== Transportation ==
Amtrak’s City of New Orleans, which operates between New Orleans and Chicago, passes through the town on CN tracks, but makes no stop. The nearest station is located in Yazoo City, 18 miles (29 km) to the south.

== Notable people ==
- Bob Quick, former professional basketball player
- Clarence Pierce, member of the Mississippi House of Representatives from 1952 to 1984

== In popular culture ==
In the 1988 film, Mississippi Burning, FBI Agent Anderson (played by Gene Hackman) says he is from Thornton, though he erroneously identifies it as being a very short distance from Memphis, Tennessee.
