= Royster =

Royster may refer to:

- Edward Royster (b. 1972), California musician
- Evan Royster, American football running back
- Jerry Royster, American baseball player
- Linda Royster Beito, professor of political science and criminal justice at Stillman College
- Ted Royster, spokesperson for the Bureau of Alcohol, Tobacco, and Firearms during the 1993 Waco siege
- Tony Royster Jr., American drummer
- Vermont C. Royster, editor at The Wall Street Journal from 1958 to 1971
