= Gus Courts =

American activist (1887–1969)

- Courts talks about racial terror in Mississippi and his injuries after leaving the hospital.
- Born: May 2, 1887; Pickens, Mississippi, U.S.
- Died: April 23, 1969 (aged 81); Chicago, Illinois, U.S.
- Occupation: grocer
- Known for: Civil Rights Movement; Voter registration; NAACP; Regional Council of Negro Leadership

Gus Courts (May 2, 1887 – April 23, 1969) was an American grocery store proprietor and African-American civil rights leader. In 1953, Courts and Rev. George W. Lee founded the Humphreys County, Mississippi chapter of the National Association for the Advancement of Colored People (NAACP). As he led a voting rights and registration drive in the 1950s, Courts was shot and wounded at his store and later testified to Congress about racial terror in Mississippi.

== Biography ==
Gus Courts was born on May 2, 1887, in Pickens, Mississippi to parents who had been enslaved prior to the Civil War. As an adult, Courts eventually owned a grocery store in Belzoni, Mississippi. Courts was involved in the local civil rights movement in the 1940s. He cooperated with the Regional Council of Negro Leadership, and in 1953 co-founded the Humphreys County chapter of the NAACP with Rev. George Lee.

In Humpheys County, 70% of the population was African American, but although the county had about 16,000 voting age African Americans in the 1950s, no African American had voted in the county since Reconstruction in the 19th century. Courts and Lee were able to persuade 400 potential voters to pay the poll tax, as the first step in registering to vote in the county at the time, and a difficult to meet barrier for a largely impoverished farm-working population. Despite physical and economic threats from the county's white power structure and obstruction from county registrars, 94 of them took the dangerous and difficult step to register.

As the registration drive was making some headway in May 1955, Rev. Lee was gunned down on a Belzoni street by white supremacists, in a still unsolved murder. Voting registrations fell after the murder, but on the next election day, Courts held a meeting at his store and 22 people volunteered to go to the polls to vote. Although warned of the danger, they marched to the court house. There, county clerks handed them questionnaires about their identities and civil rights opinions—all were refused the vote.

Continued threats and the failed attempt to vote soon left only one African American registered to vote in the county—Gus Courts, and he refused to de-register. Six months after Lee's killing, Courts was shot in front of his grocery store. Despite severe wounds, his friends managed to get him to a hospital eighty-miles away. Courts had to go so far for emergency medical treatment because the local hospital was segregated. Although the Federal Bureau of Investigation (FBI) briefly opened a file, they failed to collect evidence and the case remained unsolved—in giving a briefing on the racial violence in the South to President Dwight D. Eisenhower and his cabinet, FBI Director J Edgar Hoover appeared uninterested expending resources on such crimes.

Courts survived the shooting but concluded he and his wife had to leave Mississippi, reluctantly joining the Great Migration. They moved to Chicago and in 1957, he testified before Congress on his experiences and the racial terror in his home state, which forced multiple civil rights activists to flee the state to escape to Chicago. Courts, starting again at age 65, opened and ran a new store. He died on April 23, 1969, in Chicago, never realizing his wish to return to Mississippi.

== See also ==
- Lamar Smith (activist)
- Jim Crow
- Civil Rights Act of 1957
- Voting Rights Act of 1965
