= Lamar Smith (activist) =

African-American civil rights activist

- Lamar Smith
- Born: 1892
- Died: August 13, 1955 (aged 63); Brookhaven, Mississippi, U.S.
- Cause of death: Gunshot wound
- Occupations: Civil rights activist; farmer; military veteran
- Known for: Mississippi voter registration; Regional Council of Negro Leadership (RCNL)

Lamar "Ditney" Smith (1892 – August 13, 1955) was an American civil rights figure, African-American farmer, World War I veteran and an organizer of voter registration for African-Americans. In 1955, he was shot dead in broad daylight around 10 a.m. at close range on the lawn of the Lincoln County courthouse in Brookhaven, Mississippi.

== Details ==
Lamar Smith, a 63-year-old farmer and World War I veteran, was a voting rights activist and a member of the Regional Council of Negro Leadership (RCNL). On August 2, he voted in the primary and helped get others out to vote. There was a run-off primary scheduled for August 23. On August 13, Smith was at the courthouse helping other African-American voters to fill out absentee ballots so they could vote in the runoff without exposing themselves to violence at the polls. He was shot to death in front of the courthouse in Brookhaven, Lincoln County, at around 10 a.m.

Contemporary reports say there were at least 30 white witnesses, including the local sheriff, who saw a white man covered with blood leaving the scene. In spite of a public effort by prosecutor E. C. Barlow to obtain testimony, no witnesses would come forward. The three men who had been arrested went free. Smith apparently had attended meetings of RCNL, probably the largest civil rights organization in the state. He was also a personal friend of RCNL president T. R. M. Howard of Mound Bayou.

In 2005, filmmaker Keith Beauchamp created a documentary, Murder in Black and White of Smith's murder. In 2009, Beachamp and the FBI attempted to interview witnesses in Brookhaven. In 2018, Smith's murder once again received national attention when it was discovered that the alleged murderer was related to the husband of Senator Cindy Hyde-Smith, who made campaign comments, which she claimed were jokes, about public hangings, and cast voter suppression in a positive light.

== Background ==
Smith's murder was one of several racially motivated attacks in Mississippi in 1955. The other incidents included the murder of George W. Lee, a civil rights leader in Belzoni (May), the killing of Emmett Till, a black teenager visiting from Chicago (less than a week after Smith's murder), and the shooting of Gus Courts (December), a civil rights associate of Lee in Belzoni. The Smith case was cited in the NAACP's pamphlet M is for Mississippi and Murder.

== Lack of action ==
Three white men, Noah Smith, Mack Smith, and Charles Falvey, were arrested in connection with Smith's murder. On September 13, 1955, an all-white Brookhaven grand jury composed of twenty men failed to return any indictments. The district attorney reported that the sheriff, Carnie E. Smith, refused to make an immediate arrest "although he knew everything I know". The district attorney further reported that the sheriff told him he saw Noah Smith, one of the accused, "leave the scene with blood all over him. It was his duty to take that man into custody regardless of who he was, but he did not do it." Noting that all three of the accused were deceased, the US Department of Justice Civil Rights Division closed the civil rights case in 2016.

== See also ==
- Gus Courts
- George W. Lee
- Emmett Till
- List of unsolved murders (1900–1979)
