= 1936 Roosevelt Hawaii memo =

1936 Roosevelt Hawaii memo refers to a secret memorandum written by President Franklin D. Roosevelt on August 10, 1936 to The Chief of Naval Operations regarding Japanese ships visiting Honolulu and U.S. military planning for Hawaii and the Japanese American population there for an event of war with Japan.

== 1936 memorandum ==
Roosevelt suggested that people in Hawaii who had contacts with Japanese ships or their personnel should be “secretly but definitely identified” and placed on a list of those who could be detained first if war broke out.

"One obvious thought occurs to me -- that every Japanese citizen or non-citizen on the island of Oahu who meets these Japanese ships or has any connection with their officers or men should be secretly but definitely identified and his or her name placed on a special list of those who would be the first to be placed in a concentration camp in the event of trouble"

The memo reveled Roosevelt was considering the possibility of surveillance and detention of people of Japanese ancestry before the United States entered World War II, these concerns later contributed to Roosevelt's decision to intern Japanese Americans after Pearl Haber.

== Historiography on motivations ==
Some historians have cited this letter as evidence that Roosevelt’s wartime policies toward Japanese Americans were influenced by his own racial assumptions that existed before Pearl Harbor, and that his decision to intern Japanese Americans was done out of his own personal prejudices rather than wartime hysteria.

Historian David T. Beito in his 2023 book 'New Deal's War on The Bill of Rights' states "This policy [Decision to intern Japanese Americans] did not represent a sudden change in attitudes. Roosevelt has long considered Japanese Americans to be a suspect group."
