= Amzie Moore =

American businessman (1911–1982)

- Amzie Moore photographed in 1963 by Harvey Richards.
- Born: September 23, 1911; Grenada County, Mississippi
- Died: February 1, 1982 (aged 70)

Amzie Moore (September 23, 1911 – February 1, 1982) was an American civil rights leader and entrepreneur in the Mississippi Delta. He helped lead voter registration efforts. His former home in Cleveland, Mississippi, is a Mississippi Landmark. A historical marker commemorates its history. It is now a museum and interpretive center.

== Early life ==
Amzie Moore was extremely influential in advocating and registering African Americans in Mississippi to exercise their right to vote as American citizens. Born September 23, 1911, on Wilkin Plantation in Grenada County, Mississippi, at the age of fourteen was left to fend for himself after his parents split, and his father abandoned him. The furthest he went in his education was tenth grade at Stone Street High School in Greenwood, Mississippi

In 1935 he moved to Bolivar County and got a job as a custodian at the local Post Office; in the midst of the Great Depression, this was considered a “high status job” for an African American man in the deep South.

Having been involved in politics from a young age, he became a member of the Black and Tan Party which was an organization of African American Republicans. Although he was able to register to vote in 1936, he was unable to vote in the primaries, which heavily determined the outcomes of elections. The Freedom Movement, as it was deemed during the times, came to the Mississippi Delta in 1940, and Moore became involved in meetings beginning to draft the explicit demands that African Americans in the state wanted

== World War II ==
In 1942, upon being drafted for World War II, where he would serve in Burma, India and China, as he put it, “I really didn’t know what segregation was before I went into the Army. It was the first time I really knew how evil segregation was”. He continued to experience systematic segregation throughout his Southern stations; even in Calcutta, India there were still segregated enlisted men's clubs etc. “Why were we fighting? Why were we there? If we were fighting for the four freedoms that Roosevelt and Churchill had talked about, then certainly we felt that the American soldier should be free first.” The Japanese were capitalizing on the racism of the US and were actively using segregation as a point to discourage African American soldiers. Ironically, Moore's job was to counteract this propaganda and encourage African American soldiers that they played an important role in the fight against the Axis Powers. Once he arrived home, many whites had started a “home guard” to protect themselves against returning African American veterans; an FBI investigation into the numerous murders that occurred eventually led to the end of this particular type of aggression. Moore was more angry and outraged at the oppression, and began to become more active in voter registration in Mississippi.

== Regional Council of Negro Leadership ==
Purchasing property, building a home, and starting a service station/restaurant, while continuing to be involved in local affairs established Moore as a leader in the community. In 1951, T. R. M. Howard founded the Regional Council of Negro Leadership (RCNL) with hopes to be the African American equivalent of the white Delta Council. Wanting to be the united voice of the African Americans in Mound Bayou and surrounding areas, the RCNL quickly gained massive popularity, convincing the state police to not stop harassing drivers and began encouraging people to register to vote.

At their first mass meeting, over thirteen thousand people attended; “We decided that the purpose of the Regional Council was to teach Negroes first-class citizenship, the preservation of property, the paying of taxes, the holding of public office, the changing of the economic standpoint”. Moore and a few other leaders of the RCNL were also active participants in the NAACP, but throughout both organizations existence there was always underlying tension between viewpoints on how to bring freedom. The NAACP typically wanted to use legal measures to change the culture, with the RCNL focused more on the economic issues that plagued those living in the Delta. However they did work together when it came to voter registration; strongly stimulated by Bob Moses tapping Moore to lead the project in the Delta.

== NAACP ==
In 1955, at an NAACP meeting that he was not at, the Cleveland chapter nominated him as their president, and throughout the next year extensively built up that chapter making it the second largest in the state. He then became the vice president of the state conferences of the NAACP. When the Supreme Court desegregated public schools, the White Citizens Council began their rampage throughout the state, instilling even more fear in the African American community. There were many murders throughout the state of people who refused to take their name off the voting list, and Moore, along with many other leaders, received numerous death threats. In 1960, Moore brought the Student Nonviolent Coordinating Committee to focus their voter registration efforts in Mississippi, ultimately enfranchising thousands of African American Mississippians.
