= George W. Lee =

American civil rights activist (1903–1955)

George Washington Lee
- George W. Lee
- Born: December 25, 1903; Edwards, Mississippi, US
- Died: May 7, 1955 (aged 51); Midnight, Mississippi
- Cause of death: Assassination
- Occupations: Civil rights leader, Baptist minister, grocer
- Known for: Civil Rights Movement; Voter registration; NAACP; Regional Council of Negro Leadership
- Spouse: Rosebud

George Washington Lee (December 25, 1903 – May 7, 1955) was an African-American civil rights leader, minister, and entrepreneur. He was a vice president of the Regional Council of Negro Leadership and head of the Belzoni, Mississippi, branch of the National Association for the Advancement of Colored People. He was assassinated in 1955 in retaliation for his efforts to register African Americans to vote. Since 1890 they had been effectively disenfranchised in Mississippi due to a new state constitution; other states across the South passed similar acts and constitutions, excluding millions of people from the political system and establishing one-party states.

== Biography ==
Born in 1903, George Wesley Lee grew up in poverty in Edwards, Mississippi. His mother was a plantation worker who married after Lee was born; his stepfather was abusive. After Lee's mother died when George was young, he was taken in by her sister. Lee graduated from high school, a rarity for blacks living in his circumstances. Afterward he went to the port of New Orleans, where he worked on the banana docks and took a correspondence course in typesetting. Lee was typical of a generation of activists who came to civil rights after they had made a success in business. Like so many in this category, he came up the hard way through backbreaking work, thrift, determination, and luck.

During the 1930s and the Great Depression, Lee accepted a call to become a preacher in Belzoni, Mississippi, where he led a Baptist congregation. The town was located in Humphreys County in the heart of the Mississippi Delta. Most blacks in the state lived in this region and the majority in extreme poverty as farm workers. Lee continued to work to improve himself; he joined with local black business and community leaders. Serving as pastor at four churches, he also opened a small grocery store. Lee considered both vocations as serving the African-American community. In a back room of his house, he and his wife, Rosebud, set up a small printing business. These efforts provided enough resources that Lee felt he had a base for entering the battle for civil rights in the early 1950s. As a part of the NAACP, Lee worked tirelessly in trying to register African Americans to vote.

== Activism ==
Lee was the first black in memory to register to vote in Humphreys County, Mississippi (where blacks were a majority of the population but had been effectively disfranchised by provisions of the 1890 constitution, particularly due to white implementation of poll taxes and literacy tests). In 1953, Lee and Gus Courts, another black grocer, co-founded the Belzoni chapter of the NAACP.

When the sheriff refused to accept their poll taxes, which were required for voter registration, they took him to court. Between them, Lee and Courts registered nearly all of the county's ninety black voters in 1955. Whites were enraged by the previous year's decision by the U.S. Supreme Court's in Brown v. Board of Education (1954), ruling that segregated public schools were unconstitutional. Whites in Mississippi were determined to resist efforts at integration, particularly in black-majority areas of the Delta. They founded the White Citizens Council, with chapters throughout counties in the Delta. Whites were aggressively purging the few blacks from the voting rolls through intimidation and economic pressure; in some places, they had black activists fired from their jobs and evicted from rental housing. Lee and Courts continued their work.

Lee was a vice president of the Regional Council of Negro Leadership, a leading black organization in the state. The Council promoted self-help, business, and civil rights. It pressed for voting rights and social justice. It organized a boycott of gas stations that refused to install restrooms for blacks and was successful. The head of the Council was Dr. T. R. M. Howard, one of the wealthiest blacks in the state. Medgar Evers worked as an organizer; and was later the NAACP's field secretary for Mississippi.

In April, Lee spoke at the Council's annual meeting, which drew a crowd of more than 7,000 to the all-black town of Mound Bayou, Mississippi. Lee's "down-home dialogue and his sense of political timing" were said to have "electrified" the crowd. "Pray not for your mom and pop," Lee suggested. "They've gone to heaven. Pray you can make it through this hell."

== Death and investigation ==
Less than a month after his famous speech, Lee was shot and killed while driving in his car in Belzoni, Mississippi. An unidentified shooter pulled alongside Lee's car and fired three times from a shotgun, shattering Lee's jaw and causing his car to leave the road. Lee died before arriving at a local hospital. According to the autopsy, lead pellets extracted from his face were consistent with buckshot. A few days before, Lee had received a threatening note. The sheriff, Ike Shelton, wanted to call the incident a traffic accident and close the case. He said the buckshot pellets were dental fillings torn loose by the impact of the crash.

Howard, Evers and others demanded a thorough investigation. The sheriff and governor spurned them, but U.S. Attorney General Herbert Brownell Jr. ordered the Justice Department to look into the matter.

Lee's funeral in Belzoni attracted reporters from major black newspapers. His widow Rosebud decided to have an open casket, to reveal how her husband had suffered. Emmett Till's mother would do the same a few months later after her teenage son was lynched. Readers of the Chicago Defender shared Rosebud Lee's outrage by viewing a photo of her husband's body. The NAACP-organized memorial service in Belzoni drew more than 1,000 attendees. Tensions were high in this small rural Delta town, as whites had long expected deference from the black majority. Howard and Roy Wilkins, the national president of the NAACP, shared the speakers' platform at Lee's funeral. Howard said that some blacks "would sell their grandmas for half a dollar, but Reverend Lee was not one of them."

Civil rights activists searched the Delta looking for evidence to find the killers. Medgar Evers reputedly "cut his teeth" on the Lee case, continually feeding information to the press. Despite the efforts of activists, interest began to wane, and the FBI investigation was eventually closed. Agents had identified credible white suspects, but said that potential witnesses appeared afraid to talk. No charges were ever brought against any suspect for Lee's murder.

== Legacy ==
Lee's death captured national attention, highlighting the oppressive nature of Mississippi Jim Crow and the violence black residents had to face to exercise ordinary rights. In the state, Lee's death served as a catalyst for some activists to step up their efforts.

Lee exemplified a generation of activists who used business success to build a platform to work as mature men on civil rights. He paved the way for other leaders to come up from the African-American community, and emphasized the power of the vote.

== See also ==
- Lamar Smith (activist)
- Emmett Till
- List of unsolved murders (1900–1979)
