= Regional Council of Negro Leadership =

African-American civil rights organization

- Abbreviation: RCNL
- Formation: January 10, 1951
- Type: NGO
- Headquarters: Mississippi
- Region served: United States
- Staff: 60

The Regional Council of Negro Leadership (RCNL) was a society in Mississippi founded by T. R. M. Howard in 1951 to promote a program of civil rights, self-help, and business ownership for African Americans. It pledged "to guide our people in their civic responsibilities regarding education, registration and voting, law enforcement, tax paying, the preservation of property, the value of saving and in all things which will make us stable, qualified conscientious citizens." Instead of starting from the "grass roots," however, the strategy was to "reach the masses through their chosen leaders" by harnessing the talents of blacks with a proven record in business, the professions, education, and the church.

== History ==
At first the RCNL did not directly challenge "separate but equal" (much like the initial stance of the Montgomery Improvement Association), but zeroed in on the need to guarantee the "equal." It often identified inadequate schools as the primary factor responsible for the Northern black exodus of the second wave of the Great Migration. Instead of demanding immediate integration, however, it called for equal school terms for both races. From the beginning, the RCNL also pledged an "all-out fight for unrestricted voting rights."

Sixteen relatively autonomous committees, each headed by a respected leader in business, education, the church, or the professions, formed the backbone of the RCNL. The committees, in turn, reported to an executive board and board of directors headed by Howard. The RCNL's constitution stipulated that each town or city in the Delta with at least one thousand blacks was entitled to representation. To build mass support for the work of these committees, the RCNL made sure to hold its business meetings in different locations each year.

== Membership ==
The RCNL attracted many notable individuals of well-established reputations, including Aaron Henry, a druggist and NAACP officer from Clarksdale, Mississippi; Amzie Moore, an NAACP activist and gas station owner from Cleveland, Mississippi; President Arenia Mallory of Saints Junior College in Lexington, Mississippi; and President J. H. White of Mississippi Vocational College, now (Mississippi Valley State University), in Itta Bena, Mississippi. For many, it was their first exposure to civil rights and a training ground. In contrast to later groups, such as the Montgomery Improvement Association in Alabama, most RCNL leaders were businesspeople and professionals. Relatively few were from the clergy.

Perhaps RCNL's most famous member was Medgar Evers. Fresh from graduation at Alcorn State University in 1952, he had moved to Mound Bayou, Mississippi to sell insurance for Howard.

Evers soon became the RCNL's program director and helped to organize a boycott of those service stations that failed to provide restrooms for blacks. As part of this campaign, the RCNL distributed an estimated twenty thousand bumper stickers with the slogan "Don’t Buy Gas Where You Can’t Use the Rest Room." Beginning in 1953, it directly challenged "separate but equal" doctrine and demanded integration of schools.

The RCNL's annual meetings in Mound Bayou between 1952 and 1955 attracted crowds of ten thousand or more. They featured speeches by Rep. William L. Dawson of Chicago, Rep. Charles Diggs of Michigan, Alderman Archibald J. Carey Jr. of Chicago, and NAACP attorney Thurgood Marshall. Each of these events, in the words of Myrlie Evers (later Myrlie Evers-Williams), the wife of Medgar, constituted "a huge all-day camp meeting: a combination of pep rally, old-time revival, and Sunday church picnic." The conferences also included panels and workshops on voting rights, business ownership, and other issues. Attendance was a life transforming experience for many younger and future civil black leaders such as Fannie Lou Hamer.

In 1955, RCNL officials, including Howard and Amzie Moore, played key roles in helping to find evidence in the Emmett Till murder case. During the trial, Mamie Till Bradley, Emmett's mother; key witnesses, such as Willie Reed; and black reporters stayed in Howard's home in Mound Bayou. Dr. Howard, referring to the murders of Emmett Till and George W. Lee, and the attempted murder of Gus Courts, charged that the FBI "can’t seem to solve a crime where a Negro is involved." The statement angered FBI Director J. Edgar Hoover, who credited the FBI with the "virtual elimination of lynchings in the South," and with "breaking up the Ku Klux Klan in the Carolinas and Georgia."

After Howard left the state at the beginning of 1956, the RCNL went into decline. Nevertheless, it continued to attract many of the region's prominent civil rights leaders including Amzie Moore and Aaron Henry. The RCNL still operated in 1962 but was already being pushed into the shadows by groups such as the Council of Federated Organizations (COFO) and the Student Nonviolent Coordinating Committee (SNCC).
