= J. Edgar Hoover =

Founding father of the federal bureau of investigation (1895–1972)

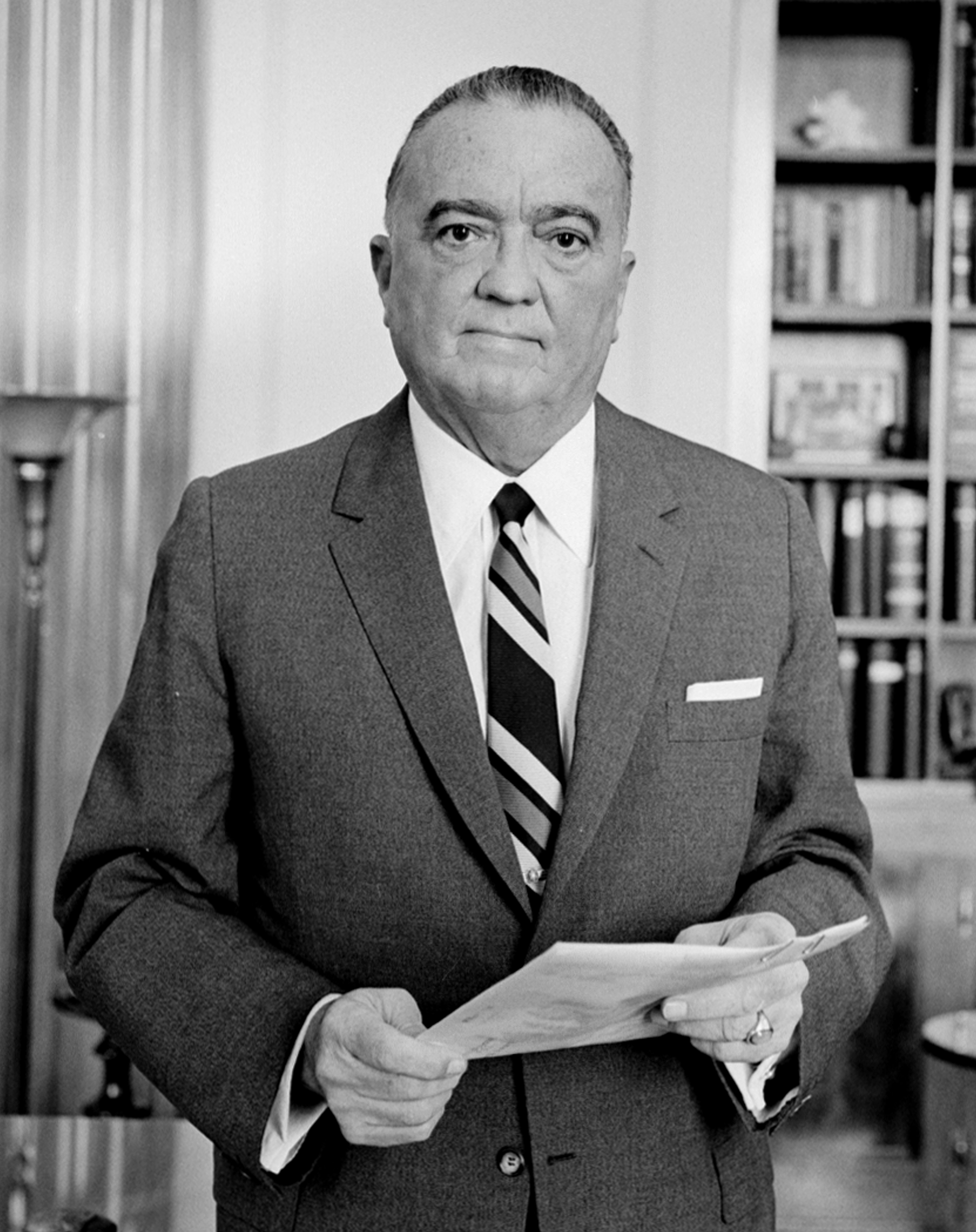
- Hoover in 1961

1st Director of the Federal Bureau of Investigation
- In office June 30, 1935 – May 2, 1972
- President: Franklin D. Roosevelt; Harry S. Truman; Dwight D. Eisenhower; John F. Kennedy; Lyndon B. Johnson; Richard Nixon
- Deputy: Clyde Tolson
- Preceded by: Position established
- Succeeded by: Clyde Tolson (acting)

5th Director of the Bureau of Investigation
- In office May 10, 1924 – June 30, 1935
- President: Calvin Coolidge; Herbert Hoover; Franklin D. Roosevelt
- Deputy: Clyde Tolson
- Preceded by: William J. Burns
- Succeeded by: Position dissolved

Deputy Head of the Bureau of Investigation
- In office August 22, 1921 – May 10, 1924
- President: Warren G. Harding; Calvin Coolidge
- Succeeded by: Clyde Tolson

Personal details
- Born: John Edgar Hoover; January 1, 1895 Washington, D.C., U.S.
- Died: May 2, 1972 (aged 77) Washington, D.C., U.S.
- Resting place: Congressional Cemetery
- Education: George Washington University (LLB, LLM)

John Edgar Hoover (January 1, 1895 – May 2, 1972) was an American law enforcement administrator who served as the fifth and final director of the Bureau of Investigation (BOI) and the first director of the Federal Bureau of Investigation (FBI). President Calvin Coolidge first appointed Hoover as director of the BOI, the predecessor to the FBI, in 1924. After 11 years in the post, Hoover became instrumental in founding the FBI in June 1935, where he remained as director for an additional 37 years until his death in May 1972 – serving a total of 48 years leading both the BOI and the FBI under eight presidents.

Hoover expanded the FBI into a larger crime-fighting agency and instituted a number of modernizations to policing technology, such as a centralized fingerprint file and forensic laboratories. Hoover also established and expanded a national blacklist, referred to as the FBI Index or Index List.

Later in life and after his death, Hoover became a controversial figure as evidence of his secretive abuses of power began to surface. He was found to have routinely violated both the FBI's own policies and the very laws which the FBI was charged with enforcing, to have used the FBI to harass and disrupt political dissidents, as well as civil rights leaders and organizations, and to have extensively collected information on officials and private citizens using illegal surveillance, wiretapping, and burglaries. Hoover consequently amassed a great deal of power and was able to intimidate and threaten high-ranking political figures.

== Early life and education ==
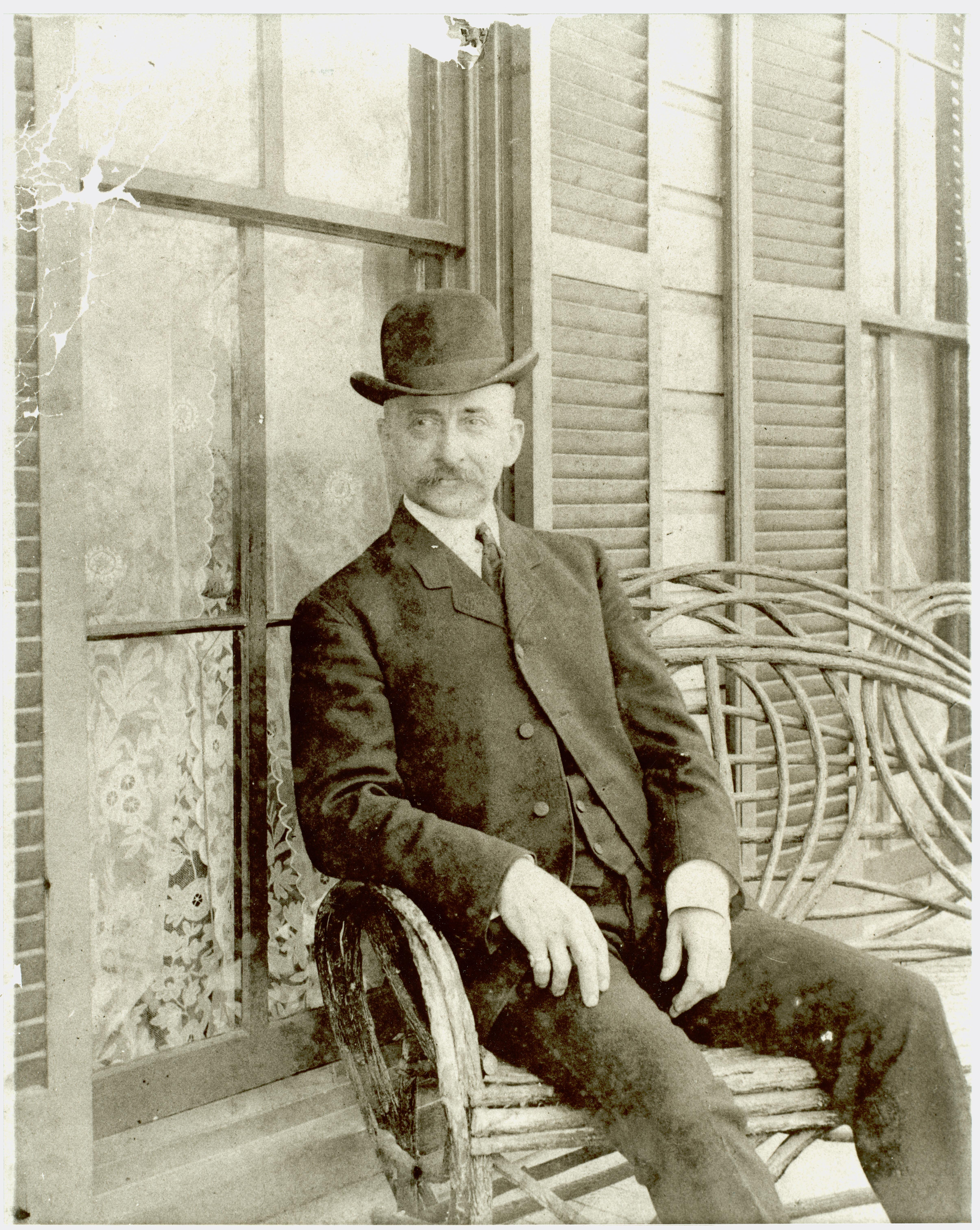
Dickerson Naylor Hoover

Hoover was born on New Year's Day 1895 in

Washington, D.C., to Dickerson Naylor Hoover (1856–1921), chief of the printing division of the United States Coast and Geodetic Survey, formerly a plate maker for the same organization, and Anne Marie "Annie" Hoover (née Scheitlin; 1860–1938). His maternal grandfather was originally from St. Gallen, Switzerland and his grandmother was born in Virginia to Swiss parents from Grisons, Switzerland. Dickerson Hoover was of English and German ancestry. Hoover's maternal great-uncle, John Hitz, was a Swiss honorary consul general to the United States. Among his family, he was the closest to his mother, who despite being "inclined to instruction", showed great affection towards her son.

Hoover was born in a house on the present site of Capitol Hill United Methodist Church, located on Seward Square near Eastern Market in Washington's Capitol Hill neighborhood. A stained glass window in the church is dedicated to him. Hoover did not have a birth certificate filed upon his birth, although it was required in 1895 in Washington. Two of his siblings did have certificates, but Hoover's was not filed until 1938 when he was 43.

Hoover lived his entire life in Washington, D.C. He attended Central High School, where he sang in the school choir, participated in the Reserve Officers' Training Corps program, and competed on the debate team. During debates, he argued against women getting the right to vote and against the abolition of the death penalty. The school newspaper applauded his "cool, relentless logic". Hoover stuttered as a boy, which he later learned to manage by teaching himself to talk quickly—a style that he carried through his adult career. He eventually spoke with such ferocious speed that stenographers had a hard time following him.

Hoover was 18 years old when he accepted his first job, an entry-level position as messenger in the orders department at the Library of Congress. The library was a half mile from his house. The experience shaped both Hoover and the creation of the FBI profiles; as Hoover observed in a 1951 letter, "This job ... trained me in the value of collating material. It gave me an excellent foundation for my work in the FBI where it has been necessary to collate information and evidence."

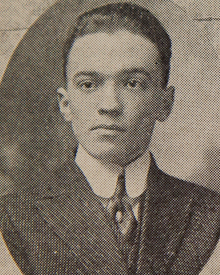
Hoover in the George Washington University yearbook, 1916

In 1916, Hoover obtained a Bachelor of Laws from the George Washington University Law School, where he was a member of the Alpha Nu Chapter of the Kappa Alpha Order, a Southern fraternity. While Kappa Alpha Order later deemed Confederate General Robert E. Lee as their spiritual founder, this happened after Hoover's time as an active member. Some prominent Kappa Alpha alumni, who had an influence on Hoover's future beliefs, included author Thomas Dixon and John Temple Graves. Hoover graduated with an LL.M. in 1917 from the same university. While a law student, Hoover became interested in the career of Anthony Comstock, the New York City U.S. Postal Inspector, who waged prolonged campaigns against fraud, vice, pornography, and birth control.

== Department of Justice ==
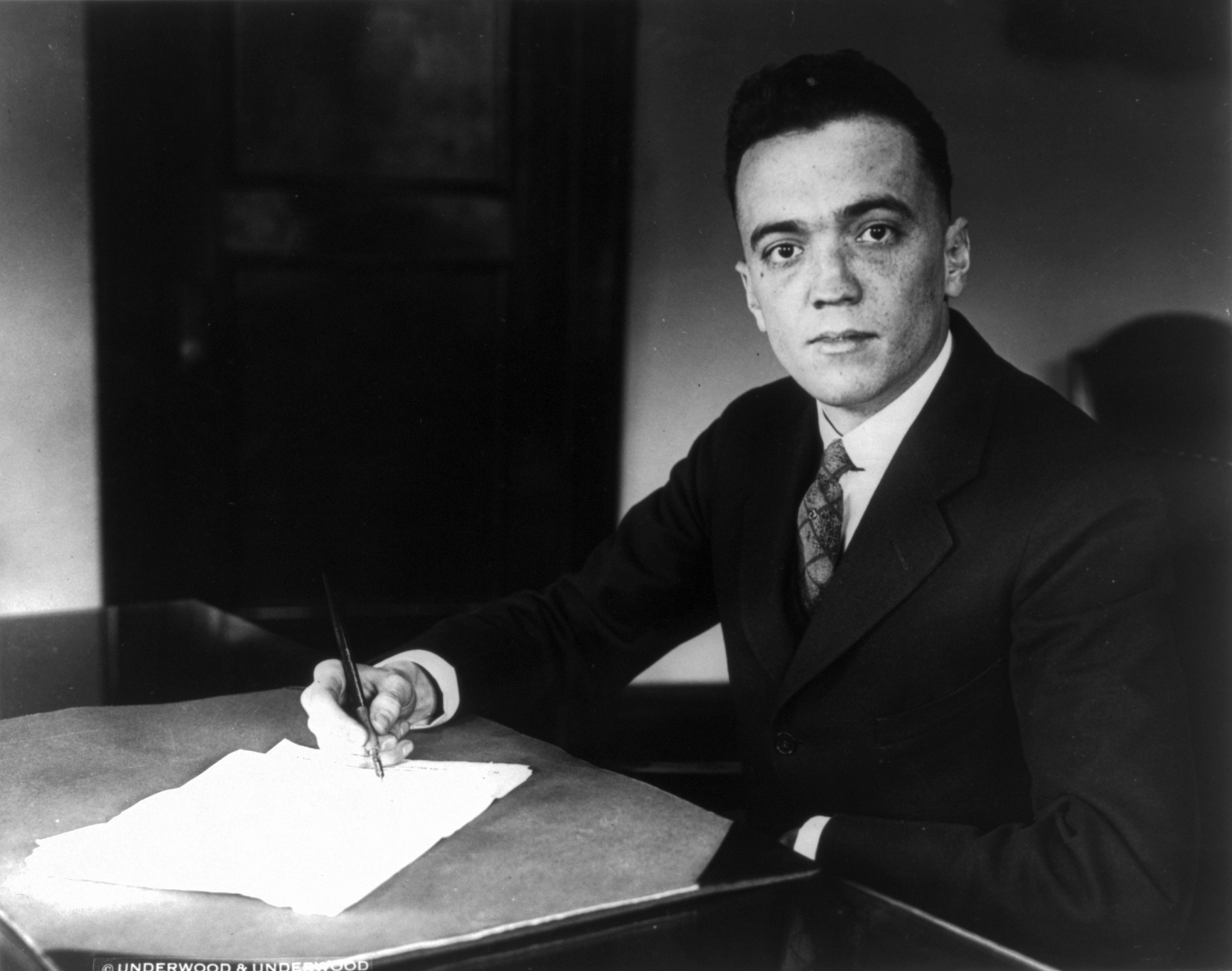
Hoover in 1932

=== War Emergency Division ===
Immediately after getting his LL.M. degree, Hoover was hired by the Justice Department to work in the War Emergency Division. He accepted the clerkship on July 27, 1917, aged 22. The job paid $990 a year ($24,900 in 2025 dollars) and was exempt from the draft. Hoover soon became the head of the Division's Alien Enemy Bureau, authorized by President Woodrow Wilson at the beginning of World War I to arrest and jail allegedly disloyal foreigners without trial. He received additional authority from the 1917 Espionage Act. Out of a list of 1,400 suspicious Germans living in the U.S., the Bureau arrested 98 and designated 1,172 as arrestable.

=== Bureau of Investigation ===
==== Head of the Radical Division ====
In August 1919, the 24-year-old Hoover became head of the Bureau of Investigation's new General Intelligence Division, also known as the Radical Division because its goal was to monitor and disrupt the work of domestic radicals. America's First Red Scare was beginning, and one of Hoover's first assignments was to carry out the Palmer raids. Hoover and his chosen assistant, George Ruch, monitored a variety of U.S. radicals. Targets during this period included Marcus Garvey; Rose Pastor Stokes and Cyril Briggs; Emma Goldman and Alexander Berkman; and future Supreme Court justice Felix Frankfurter, who, Hoover maintained, was "the most dangerous man in the United States". In 1920, at D.C.'s Federal Lodge No. 1 in Washington, D.C., the 25-year-old Hoover was initiated as a Freemason. He went on to join the Scottish Rite in which he was made a 33rd Degree Inspector General Honorary in 1955.

==== Head of the Bureau of Investigation ====
In 1921, Hoover rose in the Bureau of Investigation to deputy head, and in 1924 the Attorney General made him the acting director. On May 10, 1924, President Calvin Coolidge appointed Hoover as the fifth Director of the Bureau of Investigation, partly in response to allegations that the prior director, William J. Burns, was involved in the Teapot Dome scandal. When Hoover took over the Bureau of Investigation, it had approximately 650 employees, including 441 Special Agents. Hoover fired all female agents and banned the future hiring of them.

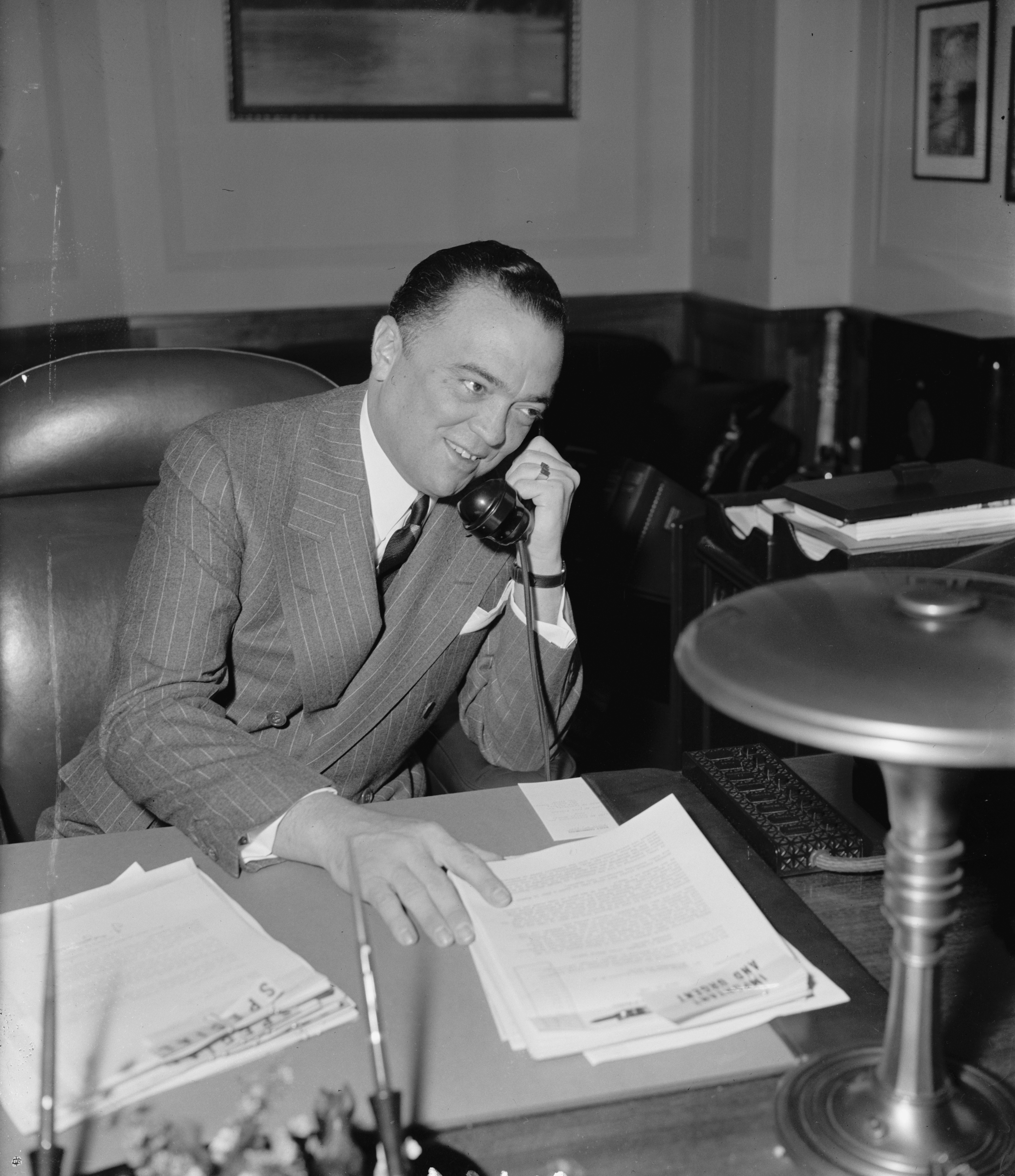
Hoover in 1940

Hoover was sometimes unpredictable in his leadership. He frequently fired Bureau agents, singling out those he thought "looked stupid like truck drivers," or whom he considered "pinheads". He also relocated agents who had displeased him to career-ending assignments and locations. Melvin Purvis was a prime example: Purvis was one of the most effective agents in capturing and breaking up 1930s gangs, and it is alleged that Hoover maneuvered him out of the Bureau because he was envious of the substantial public recognition Purvis received.

In December 1929, Hoover oversaw the protection detail for the Japanese Naval Delegation who were visiting Washington, D.C., on their way to attend negotiations for the 1930 London Naval Treaty (officially called Treaty for the Limitation and Reduction of Naval Armament). The Japanese delegation was greeted at Washington Union (train) Station by U.S. Secretary of State Henry L. Stimson and the Japanese Ambassador Katsuji Debuchi. The Japanese delegation then visited the White House to meet with President Herbert Hoover.

=== Depression-era gangsters ===
In the early 1930s, criminal gangs carried out large numbers of bank robberies in the Midwest. They used their superior firepower and fast getaway cars to elude local law enforcement agencies and avoid arrest. Many of these criminals frequently made newspaper headlines across the United States, particularly John Dillinger, who became famous for leaping over bank cages, and repeatedly escaping from jails and police traps.

The robbers operated across state lines, and Hoover pressed to have their crimes recognized as federal offenses so that he and his men would have the authority to pursue them and get the credit for capturing them. Initially, the Bureau suffered some embarrassing foul-ups, in particular with Dillinger and his conspirators. A raid on a summer lodge in Manitowish Waters, Wisconsin, called "Little Bohemia", left a Bureau agent and a civilian bystander dead and others wounded; all the gangsters escaped.

Video clips of famous Depression Era gangsters, including Pretty Boy Floyd, Baby Face Nelson, and Machine Gun Kelly.

Hoover realized that his job was then on the line, and he pulled out all stops to capture the culprits. In late July 1934, Special Agent Melvin Purvis, the Director of Operations in the Chicago office, received a tip on Dillinger's whereabouts that paid off when Dillinger was located, ambushed, and killed by Bureau agents outside the Biograph Theater. Hoover was credited for overseeing several highly publicized captures or shootings of outlaws and bank robbers. These included those of Machine Gun Kelly in 1933, of Dillinger in 1934, and of Alvin Karpis in 1936, which led to the Bureau's powers being broadened.

In 1935, the Bureau of Investigation was renamed the Federal Bureau of Investigation (FBI). It was not simply a name change. A great deal of restructuring was done. In fact, Hoover visited the lab of Canadian forensic scientist Wilfrid Derome twice – in 1929 and 1932 – to plan the foundation of his own FBI laboratory in the United States.

In 1939, the FBI became pre-eminent in domestic intelligence, thanks in large part to changes made by Hoover, such as expanding and combining fingerprint files in the Identification Division, to compiling the largest collection of fingerprints to date, and Hoover's help to expand the FBI's recruitment and create the FBI Laboratory, a division established in 1932 to examine and analyze evidence found by the FBI.

=== American Mafia ===
During the 1930s, Hoover persistently denied the existence of organized crime, despite numerous organized crime shootings as Mafia groups struggled for control of the lucrative profits deriving from illegal alcohol sales during Prohibition, and later for control of prostitution, illegal drugs and other criminal enterprises. Hoover was reluctant to pursue the Mafia as he knew that organized crime investigations typically required excessive man hours while resulting in a relatively small number of arrests. He also feared that placing underpaid FBI agents—who had a starting annual salary $5,500 in the mid-1950s—in close contact with wealthy mobsters could undermine the FBI's reputation of incorruptibility.

This practice of deliberate denial and faux-ignorance of organized crime and the Mafia repeatedly brought Hoover into conflict with President John F. Kennedy's pick for Attorney General, Robert F. Kennedy, who by contrast was determined to make these a priority for the Justice Department and shift the focus away from communism. In the past Hoover had been able to circumvent the authority of the Attorney General by going over their head directly to the President and persuading them to support his point of view. However, with President Kennedy's brother and closest advisor leading the Justice Department, Hoover had no choice but to begrudgingly go along with the Attorney General's crusade against organized crime and the Mafia.

Many writers believe Hoover's denial of the Mafia's existence and his failure to use the full force of the FBI to investigate it were due to Mafia gangsters Meyer Lansky and Frank Costello's possession of embarrassing photographs of Hoover in the company of his protégé, FBI Deputy Director Clyde Tolson. Other writers believe Costello corrupted Hoover by providing him with horseracing tips, passed through a mutual friend, gossip columnist Walter Winchell. Hoover had a reputation as "an inveterate horseplayer" and was known to send special agents to place $100 bets for him. Hoover once said the Bureau had "much more important functions" than arresting bookmakers and gamblers.

Although Hoover built the reputation of the FBI arresting bank robbers in the 1930s, his main interest had always been Communist subversion, and during the Cold War he was able to focus the FBI's attention on these investigations. From the mid-1940s through the mid-1950s, he paid little attention to criminal vice rackets such as illegal drugs, prostitution, extortion, and flatly denied the existence of the Mafia in the United States. In the 1950s, evidence of the FBI's unwillingness to investigate the Mafia became a topic of public criticism. After the Apalachin meeting of crime bosses in 1957, Hoover could no longer deny the existence of a nationwide crime syndicate. In fact, Cosa Nostra's control of the Syndicate's many branches operating criminal activities throughout North America prevailed and was heavily reported in popular newspapers and magazines. Hoover created the "Top Hoodlum Program" and went after the syndicate's top bosses throughout the country.

=== Investigation of subversion and radicals ===
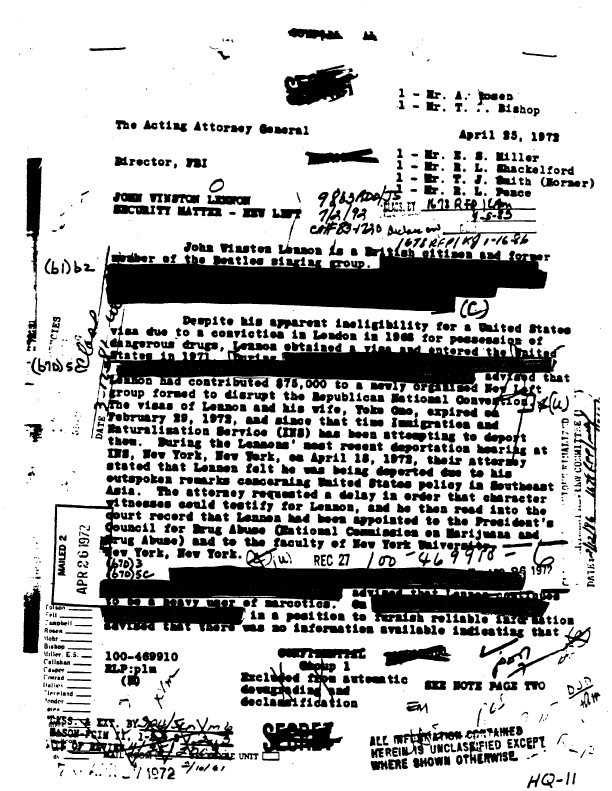
Hoover investigated ex-Beatle John Lennon by putting the singer under surveillance, and Hoover wrote this letter to Richard Kleindienst, the US Attorney General in 1972. A 25-year battle by historian Jon Wiener under the Freedom of Information Act eventually resulted in the release of documents related to John Lennon, such as this one.

Hoover was concerned about what he claimed was subversion, and under his leadership the FBI investigated tens of thousands of suspected subversives and radicals. According to critics, Hoover tended to exaggerate the dangers of these alleged subversives and many times overstepped his bounds in his pursuit of eliminating that perceived threat. William G. Hundley, a Justice Department prosecutor, joked that Hoover's investigations had actually helped the American communist movement survive, as Hoover's "informants were nearly the only ones that paid the party dues." Due to the FBI's aggressive targeting, by 1957 the membership of the Communist Party USA (CPUSA) had dwindled to less than 10,000, of whom some 1,500 were informants for the FBI.

==== Florida and Long Island U-boat landings ====
The FBI investigated rings of German saboteurs and spies starting in the late 1930s and had primary responsibility for counterespionage. The first arrests of German agents were made in 1938 and continued throughout World War II. In the Quirin affair during World War II, German U-boats set two small groups of Nazi agents ashore in Florida and on Long Island to cause acts of sabotage within the country. The two teams were apprehended after one of the agents contacted the FBI and told them everything – he was also charged and convicted.

==== Wiretapping ====
During this time period, President Franklin D. Roosevelt, out of concern over Nazi agents in the United States, gave "qualified permission" to wiretap persons "suspected ... [of] subversive activities". He went on to add in 1941 that the U.S. Attorney General had to be informed of its use in each case. Attorney General Robert H. Jackson left it to Hoover to decide how and when to use wiretaps, as he found the "whole business" distasteful. Jackson's successor at the post of Attorney General, Francis Biddle, did turn down Hoover's requests on occasion. An example of J. Edgar Hoover approving wiretaps is the Nixon wiretaps.

==== Concealed espionage discoveries ====
In the late 1930s, President Franklin D. Roosevelt gave Hoover the task to investigate both foreign espionage in the United States and the activities of domestic communists and fascists. When the Cold War began in the late 1940s, the FBI under Hoover undertook the intensive surveillance of communists and other left-wing activists in the United States. The FBI also participated in the Venona project, a pre-World War II joint project with the British to eavesdrop on Soviet spies in the UK and the United States. They did not initially realize that espionage was being committed, but the Soviets' multiple use of one-time pad ciphers (which with single use are unbreakable) created redundancies that allowed some intercepts to be decoded. These established that espionage was being carried out. Hoover kept the intercepts – America's greatest counterintelligence secret – in a locked safe in his office. He chose not to inform President Harry S. Truman, Attorney General J. Howard McGrath, or Secretaries of State Dean Acheson and General George Marshall while they held office. He informed the Central Intelligence Agency (CIA) of the Venona Project in 1952.

==== Plans for expanding the FBI to do global intelligence ====
After World War II, Hoover advanced plans to create a "World-Wide Intelligence Service". These plans were shot down by the Truman administration. Truman objected to the plan, emerging bureaucratic competitors opposed the centralization of power inherent in the plans, and there was a considerable aversion to creating an American version of the "Gestapo".

==== Plans for suspending habeas corpus ====
In 1946, Attorney General Tom C. Clark authorized Hoover to compile a list of potentially disloyal Americans who might be detained during a wartime national emergency. In 1950, at the outbreak of the Korean War, Hoover submitted a plan to President Truman to suspend the writ of habeas corpus and detain 12,000 Americans suspected of disloyalty. Truman did not act on the plan.

==== COINTELPRO and the 1950s ====
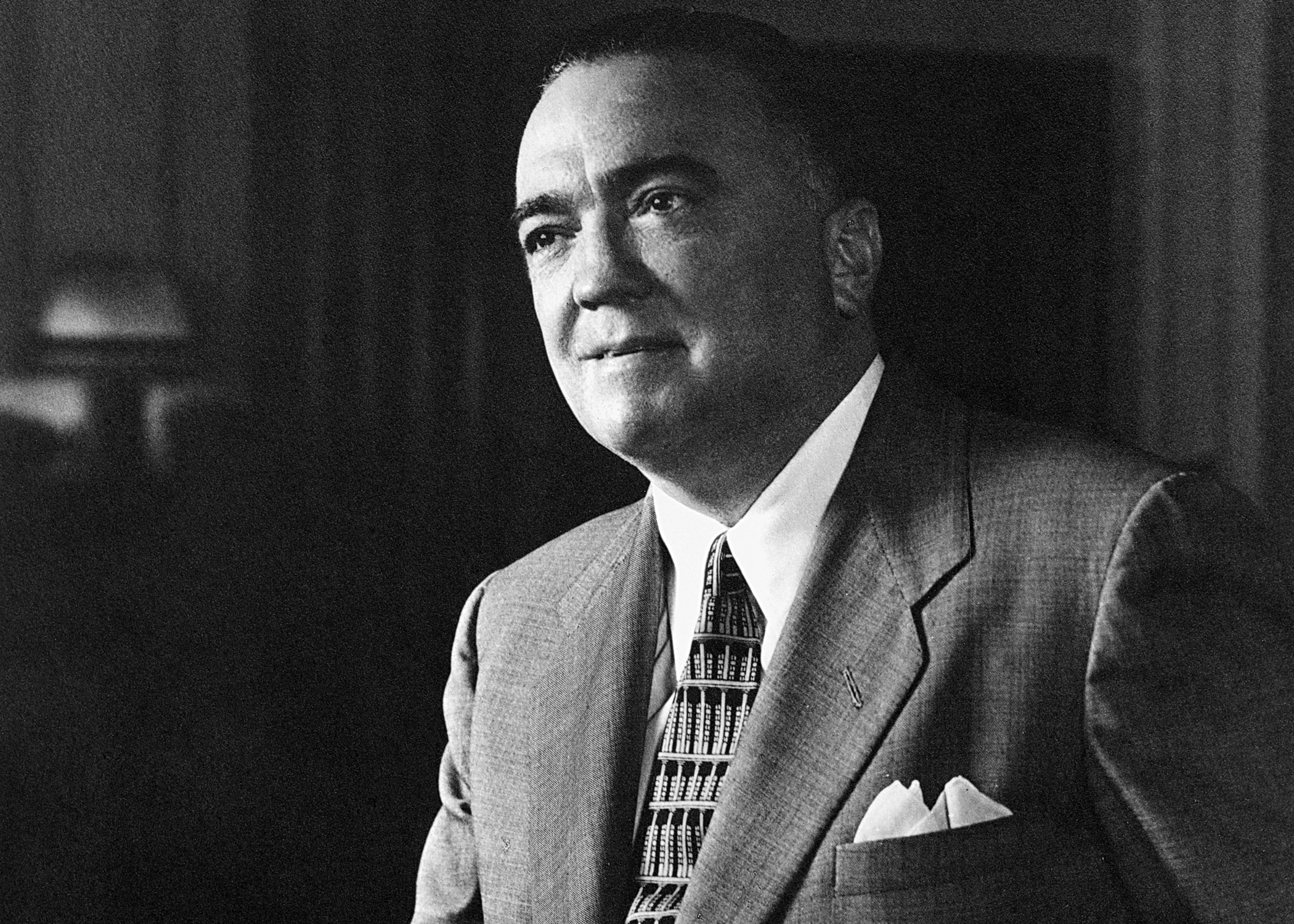
Hoover photographed in 1959

In 1956, Hoover was becoming increasingly frustrated by U.S. Supreme Court decisions that limited the Justice Department's ability to prosecute people for their political opinions, most notably communists. Some of his aides reported that he purposely exaggerated the threat of communism to "ensure financial and public support for the FBI." At this time he formalized a covert "dirty tricks" program under the name COINTELPRO. COINTELPRO was first used to disrupt the CPUSA, where Hoover ordered observation and pursuit of targets that ranged from suspected citizen spies to larger celebrity figures, such as Charlie Chaplin, whom he saw as spreading Communist propaganda.

COINTELPRO's methods included infiltration, burglaries, setting up illegal wiretaps, planting forged documents, and spreading false rumors about key members of target organizations. Some authors have charged that COINTELPRO methods also included inciting violence and arranging murders. This program remained in place until it was exposed to the public in 1971, after the burglary by a group of eight activists of many internal documents from an office in Media, Pennsylvania, whereupon COINTELPRO became the cause of some of the harshest criticism of Hoover and the FBI. COINTELPRO's activities were investigated in 1975 by the United States Senate Select Committee to Study Governmental Operations with Respect to Intelligence Activities, called the "Church Committee" after its chairman, Senator Frank Church (D-Idaho); the committee declared COINTELPRO's activities were illegal and contrary to the Constitution.

Hoover amassed significant power by collecting files containing large amounts of compromising and potentially embarrassing information on many powerful people, especially politicians. According to Laurence Silberman, appointed Deputy Attorney General in early 1974, FBI Director Clarence M. Kelley thought such files either did not exist or had been destroyed. After The Washington Post broke a story in January 1975, Kelley searched and found them in his outer office. The House Judiciary Committee then demanded that Silberman testify about them.

=== Reaction to civil rights groups ===
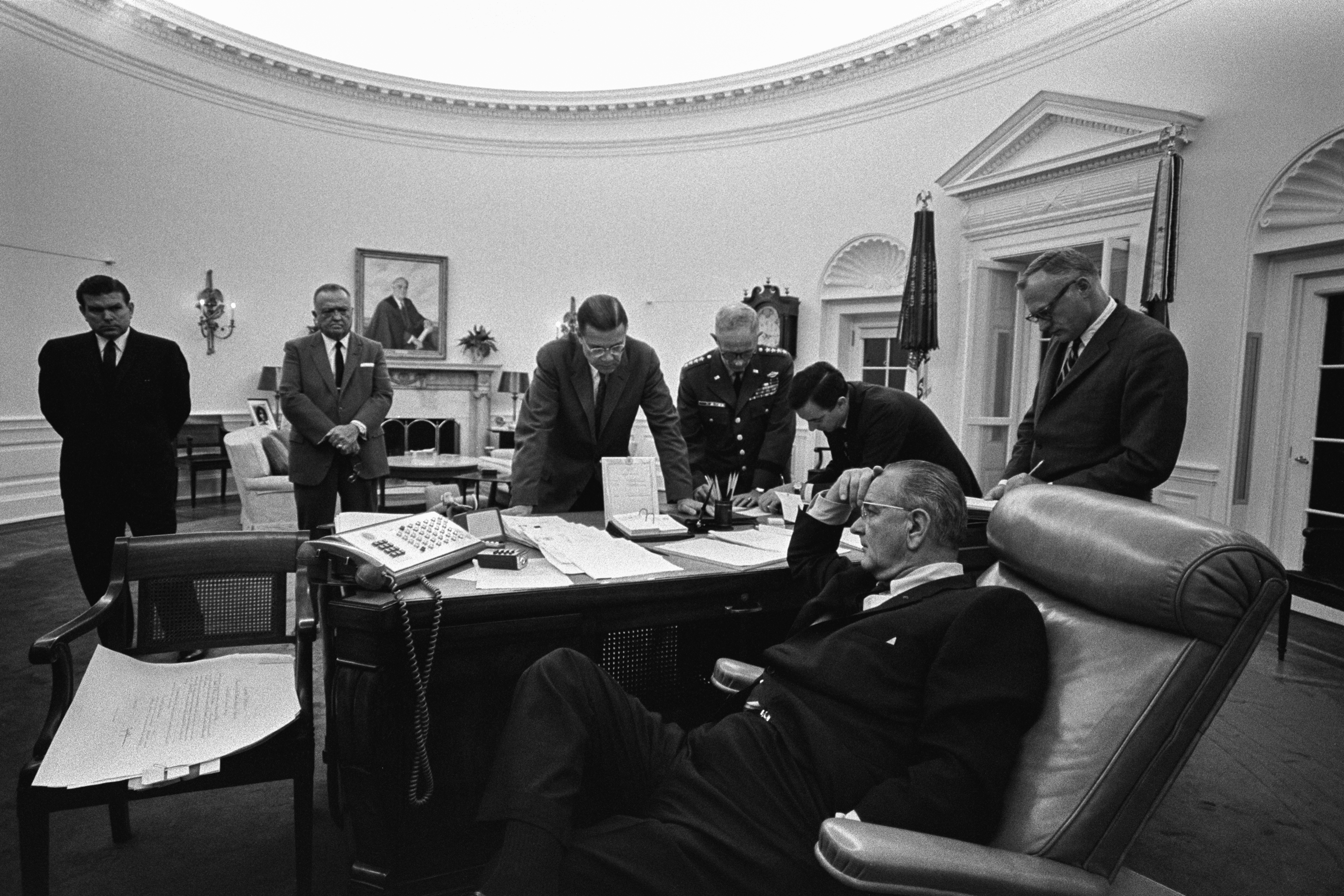
July 24, 1967. President Lyndon B. Johnson (seated, foreground) confers with (background L-R): Marvin Watson, J. Edgar Hoover, Sec. Robert McNamara, Gen. Harold Keith Johnson, Joe Califano, Sec. of the Army Stanley Rogers Resor, on responding to the Detroit riots

Hoover had opposed the Civil Rights Movement and often falsely linked its figures like Martin Luther King Jr. as subversive communist threats to the established order and "American way of life". In 1956, several years before he targeted King, Hoover had a public showdown with T. R. M. Howard, a civil rights leader from Mound Bayou, Mississippi. During a national speaking tour, Howard had criticized the FBI's failure to investigate thoroughly the racially motivated murders of George W. Lee, Lamar Smith, and Emmett Till. Hoover wrote an open letter to the press singling out these statements as "irresponsible".

Later through the FBI program COINTELPRO, Hoover issued directives to "discredit, disrupt, and destroy" civil rights leaders and organizations, authorizing wire taps and other forms of surveillance to try to gather information that could be used to discredit them. In the 1960s, Hoover's FBI monitored John Lennon, Malcolm X, and Muhammad Ali. COINTELPRO tactics were later extended to organizations such as the Nation of Islam, the Black Panther Party, King's Southern Christian Leadership Conference and others. Hoover's moves against people who maintained contacts with subversive elements, some of whom were members of the civil rights movement, also led to accusations of trying to undermine their reputations.

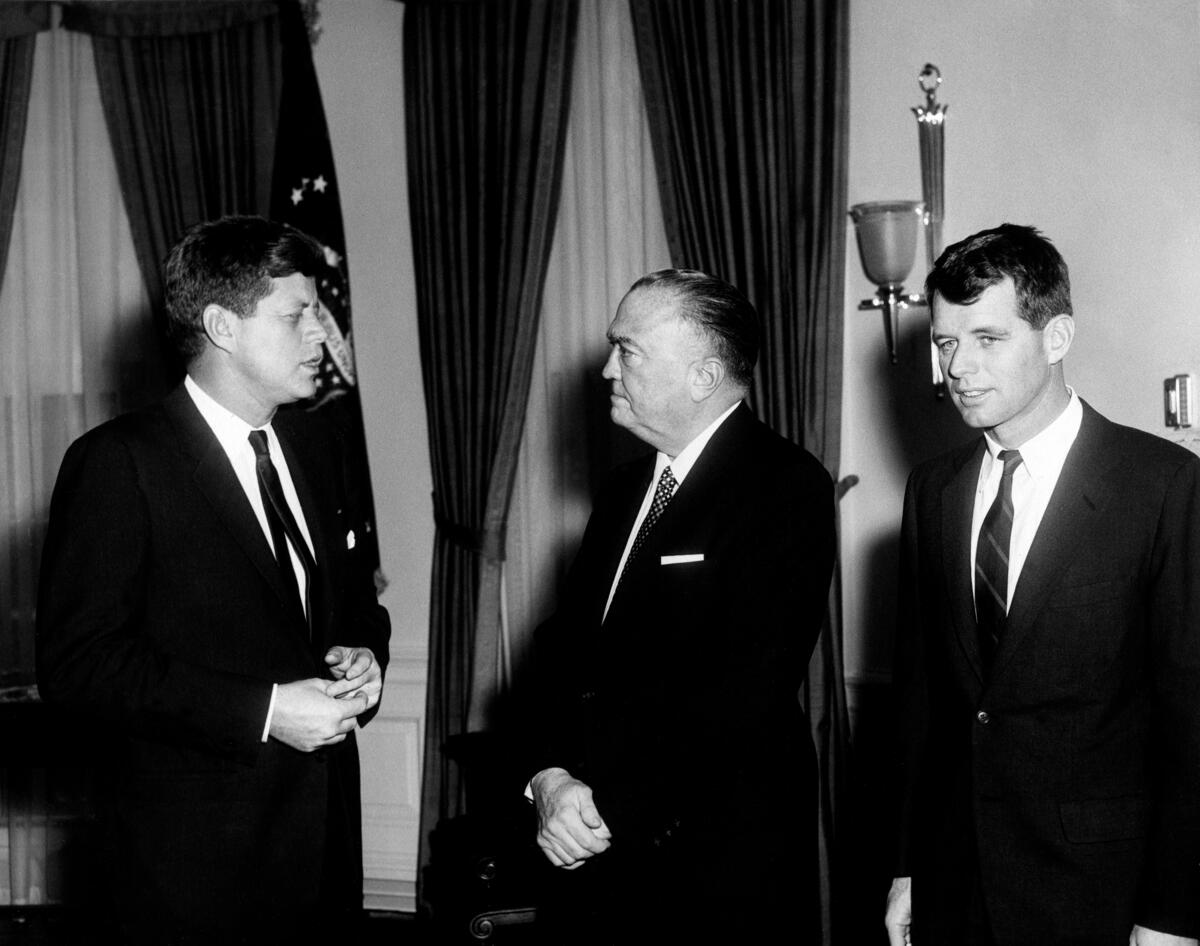
Hoover meeting with President John F. Kennedy and Attorney General Robert F. Kennedy in the Oval Office at White House.

The treatment of Martin Luther King Jr. and actress Jean Seberg are two examples: Jacqueline Kennedy recalled that Hoover told President John F. Kennedy that King had tried to arrange a sex party while in the capital for the March on Washington and that Hoover told Robert F. Kennedy that King had made derogatory comments during the President's funeral. Under Hoover's leadership, the FBI sent an anonymous blackmail letter to King shortly before he accepted the Nobel Peace Prize in 1964, indicating "There is only one thing left for you to do", which King interpreted as an exhortation for him to commit suicide; however, King's interpretation of the letter has not been proven, with more portions of the letter being made public in 2014 which revealed that it also praised "older leaders" in the civil right movement such as Roy Wilkins and urged King to step aside and let other men lead the movement.

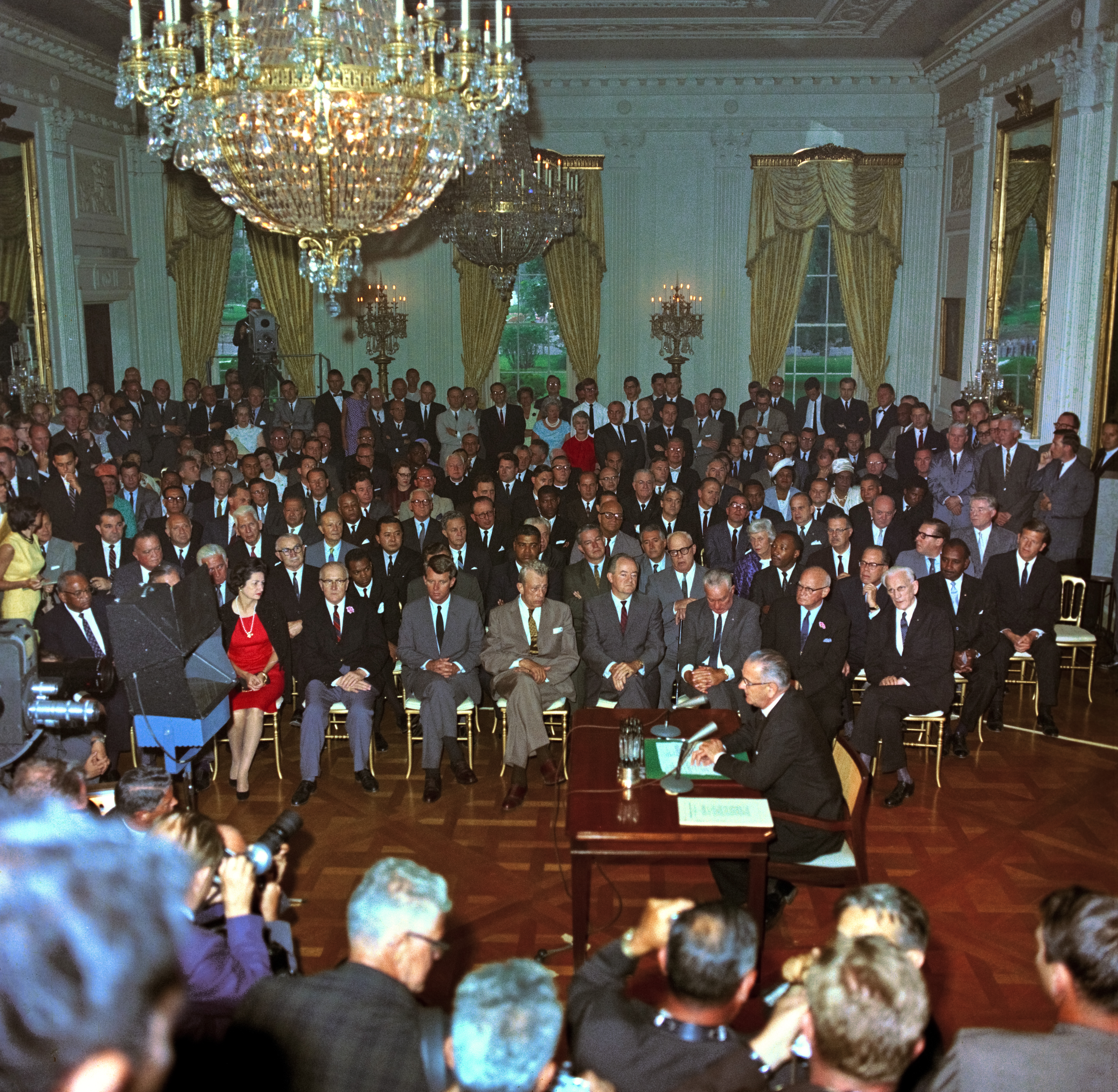
President Lyndon B. Johnson at the signing of the Civil Rights Act of 1964. White House East Room. People watching include Attorney General Robert F. Kennedy, Senate Minority Leader Everett M. Dirksen, Senator Hubert Humphrey, First Lady "Lady Bird" Johnson, Rev. Martin Luther King Jr., F.B.I. Director J. Edgar Hoover, Speaker of the House John McCormack. Television cameras are broadcasting the ceremony.

The Church Committee, a U.S. Senate subcommittee led by U.S. Senator Frank Church which investigated numerous controversial FBI activities, found in 1976 that the FBI's intent was to push King out of SCLC leadership. King's aide Andrew Young claimed in a 2013 interview with the Academy of Achievement that the main source of tension between the SCLC and FBI was the government agency's lack of black agents, and that both parties were willing to co-operate with each other by the time the Selma to Montgomery marches had taken place.

In one 1965 incident, white civil rights worker Viola Liuzzo was murdered by Ku Klux Klansmen, who had given chase and fired shots into her car after noticing that her passenger was a young black man; one of the Klansmen was Gary Thomas Rowe, an acknowledged FBI informant. The FBI spread rumors that Liuzzo was a member of the CPUSA and had abandoned her children to have sexual relationships with African Americans involved in the civil rights movement. FBI records show that Hoover personally communicated these insinuations to President Lyndon B. Johnson. Nevertheless, three Klansmen would be convicted in a federal trial for Liuzzo's murder in December 1965.

Hoover also personally ordered the cessation of the Federal inquiry into the 1963 16th Street Baptist Church bombing by members of the Ku Klux Klan that killed four girls. By May 1965, local investigators and the FBI had identified suspects in the bombing and witnesses, and this information was relayed to Hoover. No prosecutions of the four suspects ensued even though the evidence was reportedly "so strong that even a white Alabama jury would convict". There had been a history of mistrust between local and federal investigators.

Hoover wrote in a memo that the chances of a conviction were remote and told his agents not to share their results with federal or state prosecutors. In 1968, the FBI formally closed their investigation into the bombing without filing charges against any of their named suspects. The files were sealed by order of Hoover. Hoover in 1970 personally authorized "black-bag" jobs against the Weather Underground per testimony from William C. Sullivan. In 1976, congressional investigations reviewed the FBI's campaign against King and criticized it as being "one of the most abusive of all FBI programs".

=== Late career and death ===
One of his biographers, Kenneth Ackerman, wrote that the allegation that Hoover's secret files kept presidents from firing him "is a myth". President Richard Nixon was recorded in 1971 as stating that one of the reasons he would not fire Hoover was that he was afraid of Hoover's reprisals against him. Similarly, Presidents Harry S. Truman and John F. Kennedy considered dismissing Hoover as FBI Director, but ultimately concluded that the political cost of doing so would be too great. In 1964, Hoover's FBI investigated Jack Valenti, a special assistant and confidant of President Lyndon Johnson, married to Johnson's personal secretary, but who allegedly maintained a homosexual relationship with a commercial photographer friend.

Hoover personally directed the FBI investigation of the assassination of President John F. Kennedy. In 1964, just days before Hoover testified in the earliest stages of the Warren Commission hearings, President Lyndon B. Johnson waived the then mandatory U.S. Government Service Retirement Age of 70, allowing Hoover to remain the FBI Director "for an indefinite period of time". Hoover had been among those to suggest the setting up of the commission, faced with a suspicious public, Hoover wrote to White House aide Walter Jenkins that "the thing I am concerned about is having something issued so that we can convince the public that Oswald is the real assassin". The House Select Committee on Assassinations issued a report in 1979 critical of the performance by the FBI, the Warren Commission, and other agencies. The report criticized the FBI's (Hoover's) reluctance to investigate thoroughly the possibility of a conspiracy to assassinate the President.

When Nixon took office in January 1969, Hoover had just turned 74. There was a growing sentiment in Washington, D.C., that the aging FBI chief should retire, but Hoover's power and friends in Congress remained too strong for him to be forced to do so. Hoover remained director of the FBI until he died of a heart attack in his Washington home, on May 2, 1972, whereupon operational command of the Bureau was passed onto Associate Director Clyde Tolson. On May 3, 1972, Nixon appointed L. Patrick Gray – a Justice Department official with no FBI experience – as acting director of the FBI, with W. Mark Felt becoming associate director.

Hoover's body lay in state in the U.S. Capitol rotunda, where Chief Justice Warren Burger eulogized him. Up to that time, Hoover was the only civil servant to have lain in state according to The New York Daily News. At the time, The New York Times observed that this was "an honor accorded to only 21 persons before, of whom eight were Presidents or former Presidents." President Nixon delivered another eulogy at the funeral service in The National Presbyterian Church, and called Hoover "one of the Giants, [whose] long life brimmed over with magnificent achievement and dedicated service to this country which he loved so well". Hoover is buried in the Congressional Cemetery in Washington, D.C., next to the graves of his parents and a sister who had died in infancy.

== Legacy ==
=== FBI ===
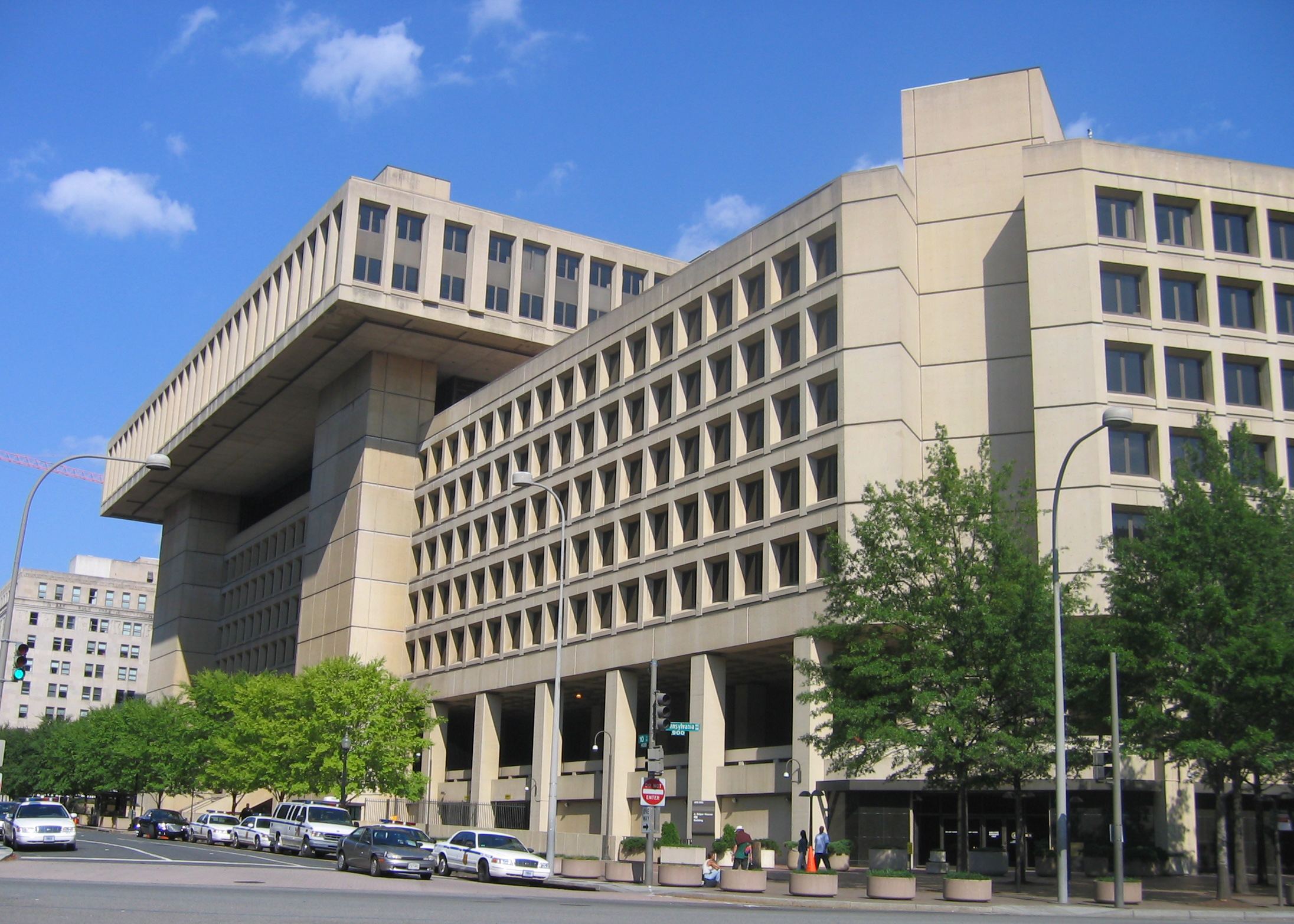
J. Edgar Hoover Building in Washington, D.C.

Biographer Kenneth D. Ackerman summarizes Hoover's legacy thus,

For better or worse, he built the FBI into a modern, national organization stressing professionalism and scientific crime-fighting. For most of his life, Americans considered him a hero. He made the G-Man brand so popular that, at its height, it was harder to become an FBI agent than to be accepted into an Ivy League college.

Hoover worked to groom the image of the FBI in American media; he was a consultant to Warner Brothers for a theatrical film about the FBI, The FBI Story (1959), and in 1965 on Warner's long-running spin-off television series, The F.B.I. President Harry S. Truman said that Hoover transformed the FBI into his private secret police force,

... we want no Gestapo or secret police. The FBI is tending in that direction. They are dabbling in sex-life scandals and plain blackmail. J. Edgar Hoover would give his right eye to take over, and all congressmen and senators are afraid of him.

Because Hoover's actions came to be seen as abuses of power, FBI directors are now limited to one 10-year term, subject to extension by the U.S. Senate. Jacob Heilbrunn, journalist and senior editor at The National Interest, gives a mixed assessment of Hoover's legacy:

There's no question that Hoover's record is a mixed one, but I don't think he was a demon. He's constantly being decried as being virulently anti-communist as if this was just a symptom of his paranoia. But if anything, he wasn't vigilant enough in ferreting out communist infiltration in the Roosevelt administration—we now know from KGB archives that there were dozens if not hundreds of KGB informants working inside the government. He's also regularly accused of broaching people's civil liberties—but in fact, Hoover resisted the wire-tapping activities that President Nixon wanted to perpetuate.

The FBI Headquarters in Washington, D.C. is named the J. Edgar Hoover Building, after Hoover. Because of the controversial nature of Hoover's legacy, both Republicans and Democrats have periodically introduced legislation in the House and Senate to rename it. The first such proposal came just two months after the building's inauguration. On December 12, 1979, Gilbert Gude—a Republican congressman from Maryland—introduced H.R. 11137, which would have changed the name of the edifice from the "J. Edgar Hoover F.B.I. Building" to simply the "F.B.I. Building"; however, that bill never made it out of committee, nor did two subsequent attempts by Gude. Another notable attempt came in 1993 when Democratic Senator Howard Metzenbaum pushed for a name change following a new report about Hoover's ordered "loyalty investigation" of future Senator Quentin Burdick.

In 1998, Democratic Senator Harry Reid sponsored an amendment to strip Hoover's name from the building, stating that "J. Edgar Hoover's name on the FBI building is a stain on the building." The Senate did not adopt the amendment. The building is "aging" and "deteriorating", and its naming might eventually be made moot by the FBI moving its headquarters to a new suburban site. Hoover's practice of violating civil liberties for the stated sake of national security has been questioned in reference to recent national surveillance programs. An example is a lecture titled Civil Liberties and National Security: Did Hoover Get it Right?, given at The Institute of World Politics on April 21, 2015.

Some qualified praise for Hoover came from the Soviet double agent Kim Philby, who spent time in Washington. Philby respected the way Hoover had built the FBI into a serious intelligence agency from virtually nothing, but Joseph McCarthy was a fake; and Hoover knew that McCarthy was a fake, but found it useful to manipulate McCarthy.

== Private life ==
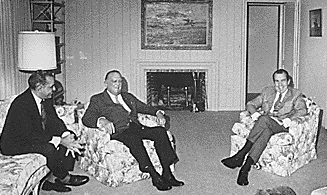
Hoover with Bebe Rebozo (left) and Richard Nixon. The three men relax before dinner, Key Biscayne, Florida, December 1971.

=== Pets ===
Hoover received his first dog from his parents when he was a child, after which he was never without one. He owned many throughout his lifetime and became an aficionado. He was especially knowledgeable in breeding of pedigrees, particularly Cairn Terriers and Beagles. He gave many dogs to notable people, such as Presidents Herbert Hoover (not closely related) and Lyndon B. Johnson, and buried seven canine pets, including a Cairn Terrier named Spee De Bozo, at Aspen Hill Memorial Park, in Silver Spring, Maryland.

=== Sexuality ===
Hoover never married or had a romantic relationship with a woman. In the 1940s, rumors began circulating that Hoover was homosexual. Hoover reportedly hunted and threatened anyone who insinuated that he was homosexual. On May 2, 1969, Screw published the first reference in print to Hoover's sexuality, titled "Is J. Edgar Hoover a Fag?"

Hoover described Clyde Tolson as his alter ego. Both single, the two men worked closely; also, they often went to night clubs together, dined together, and vacationed together. This closeness between the two men is often cited as evidence that they were lovers. Some FBI employees who knew them, such as Mark Felt, say the relationship was "brotherly"; former FBI executive assistant director Mike Mason suggested that some of Hoover's colleagues denied that he had a sexual relationship with Tolson to protect Hoover's image. Hoover bequeathed his estate to Tolson, who moved into Hoover's house after Hoover died. Tolson accepted the American flag that draped Hoover's casket. Tolson is buried a few yards away from Hoover in the Congressional Cemetery.

Some associates and scholars have dismissed rumors about Hoover's alleged homosexuality (Note: One of Hoover's biographers, Richard Hack, does not believe the director was gay. Hack notes that Hoover was romantically linked to actress Dorothy Lamour in the late 1930s and early 1940s and that after Hoover's death, Lamour did not deny rumors that she had had an affair with him. Hack further reported that during the 1940s and 1950s Hoover attended social events with Lela Rogers, the divorced mother of dancer and actress Ginger Rogers, so often that many of their mutual friends assumed the pair would eventually marry. According to Hack, Roy Cohn's opinion was that Hoover was too frightened of his own sexuality to have anything approaching a normal sexual or romantic relationship.) (and rumors about an alleged sexual relationship with Tolson) as unlikely, while others have described them as probable or even "confirmed". (Note: According to Anthony Summers, Hoover often frequented New York City's Stork Club. Luisa Stuart, a model who was 18 or 19 at the time, told Summers that she had seen Hoover holding hands with Tolson as they all rode in a limo uptown to the Cotton Club in 1936. Actress and singer Ethel Merman was a friend of Hoover's since 1938, and familiar with all parties during his alleged romance of Lela Rogers. In a 1978 interview and in response to Anita Bryant's anti-gay campaign, she said: "Some of my best friends are homosexual: Everybody knew about J. Edgar Hoover, but he was the best chief the FBI ever had.") Other scholars have noted the rumors without expressing an opinion about their validity. Historians John Stuart Cox and Athan G. Theoharis concluded that "the strange likelihood is that Hoover never knew sexual desire at all". Anthony Summers, who wrote Official and Confidential: The Secret Life of J. Edgar Hoover (1993), stated that there was no ambiguity about the FBI director's sexual proclivities and described him as "bisexual with failed heterosexuality". (Note: Summers added that mob leader Meyer Lansky "controlled" compromising pictures of a sexual nature featuring Hoover with Tolson. Summers stated that this blackmail material on Hoover made Hoover reluctant to pursue organized crime. Recklessly indiscreet behavior by Hoover would have been totally out of character, whatever his sexuality. Most biographers consider the story of Mafia blackmail unlikely in light of the FBI's investigations of the Mafia.)

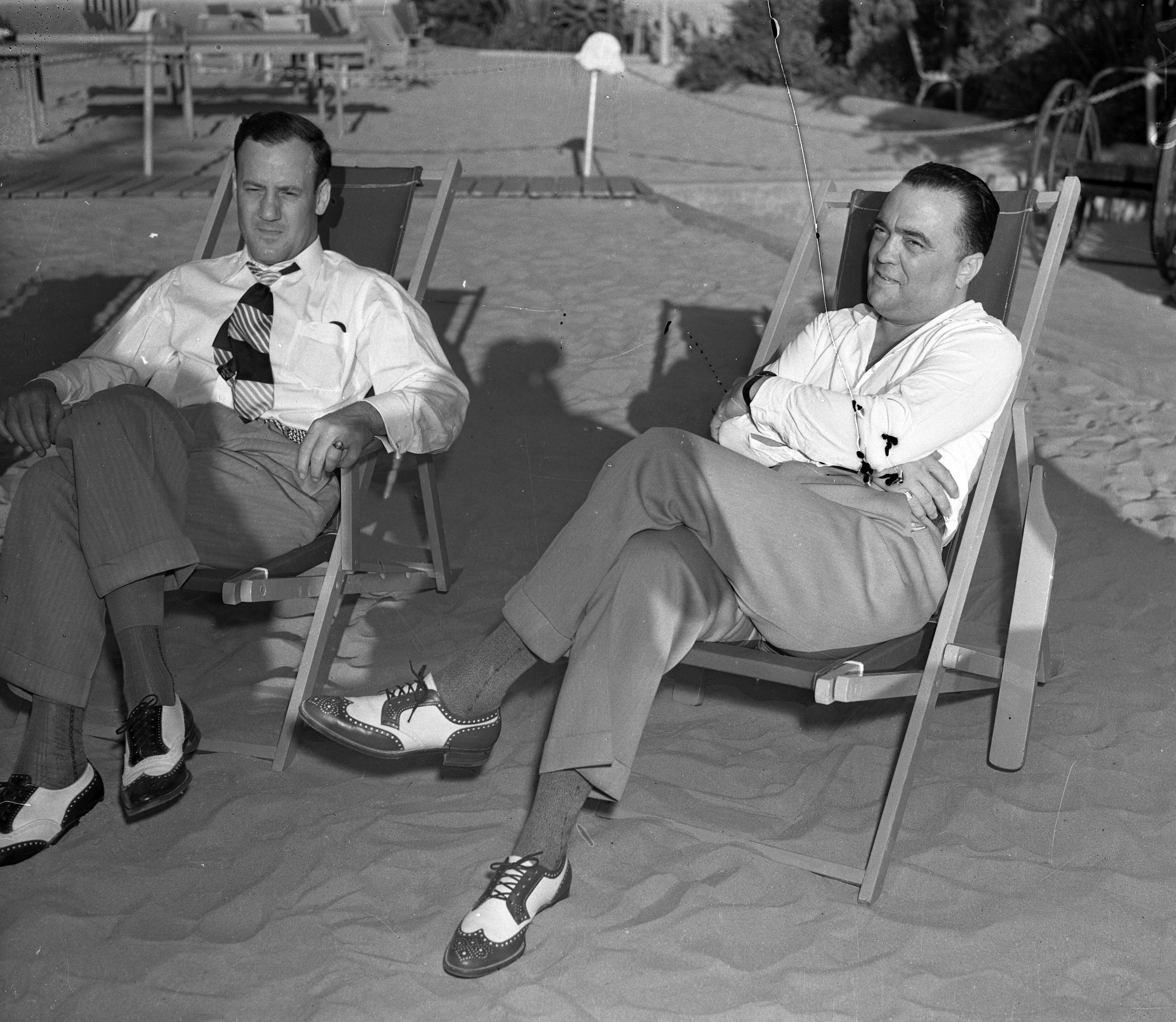
Hoover and his assistant Clyde Tolson c. 1939

In his 2004 study, historian David K. Johnson attacked the speculations about Hoover's homosexuality as relying on "the kind of tactics Hoover and the security program he oversaw perfected: guilt by association, rumor, and unverified gossip".

Hoover kept a large collection of pornographic films, photographs, and written materials, with particular emphasis on nude photos of celebrities. He reportedly used these for his own titillation and held them for blackmail purposes.

Summers quoted Susan Rosenstiel as claiming to have seen Hoover engaging in cross-dressing in the 1950s at all-male parties at the Plaza Hotel with attorney Roy Cohn and young male prostitutes. Another Hoover biographer, Burton Hersh, later corroborated this story. (Note: Journalist Liz Smith wrote that Cohn told her about Hoover's rumored transvestism "long before it became common gossip." Some of Roy Cohn's former clients, including Bill Bonanno, son of crime boss Joseph Bonanno, also cite photographs of Hoover in drag allegedly possessed by Cohn. Fashion expert Tim Gunn recalled that as a child, he toured the FBI offices with his father, who asked him and his sister if they would like to meet Vivian Vance. The children had a pleasant meeting with a woman in Hoover's office. Years later, a search of the FBI visitor logs did not show Vance had visited Hoover's office that day. Gunn's conclusion was that Hoover had impersonated Vance on the day of his visit.) Others have expressed skepticism about accounts of Hoover's tranvestism. (Note: Biographer Kenneth Ackerman stated that Summers' account of Hoover's alleged transvestism has been "widely debunked by historians". The cross-dressing story is said to be a myth by Swedish authors Åke Persson and Thomas Oldrup in their book "101 historiska myter" (101 Historical Myths). Skeptics of the cross-dressing allegations point to Susan Rosenstiel's lack of credibility (she pleaded guilty to attempted perjury in a 1971 case and later served time in a New York City jail).)

=== Ancestry ===
Since the release of the 2011 film J. Edgar, Hoover's genealogy has become a topic of interest. A theory that Hoover had African-American heritage has not been substantiated. There are also family stories and genealogies recorded by writer Millie McGhee in her 2000 book Secrets Uncovered: J. Edgar Hoover — Passing for White?, where she and Hoover are said to have a common ancestor. The claim has not been proven.

== Written works ==
Hoover was the nominal author of a number of books and articles, for which he received the credit and royalties, although it is widely believed that all of these were ghostwritten by FBI employees.

- Hoover, J. Edgar (1938). Persons in Hiding. Gaunt Publishing. Reprint: ISBN 978-1-56169-340-5.
- Hoover, J. Edgar (February 1947). "Red Fascism in the United States Today". The American Magazine.
- Hoover, J. Edgar (1958). Masters of Deceit: The Story of Communism in America and How to Fight It. Holt Rinehart and Winston. Reprint: ISBN 978-1-4254-8258-9.
- Hoover, J. Edgar (1961). "J. Edgar Hoover on the FBI". Encyclopædia Britannica (Online ed.). Chicago: Encyclopædia Britannica, Inc. ISSN 1085-9721. OCLC 33663660.
- Hoover, J. Edgar (1962). A Study of Communism. Holt Rinehart & Winston. Reprint: ISBN 978-0-03-031190-1.

== Honors ==
- 1938: Oklahoma Baptist University awarded Hoover an honorary doctorate during commencement exercises, at which he spoke.
- 1939: the National Academy of Sciences awarded Hoover its Public Welfare Medal.
- 1950: King George VI of the United Kingdom appointed Hoover Honorary Knight Commander of the Order of the British Empire.
- 1955: President Dwight D. Eisenhower awarded Hoover the National Security Medal.
- 1966: President Lyndon B. Johnson bestowed the State Department's Distinguished Service Award on Hoover for his service as director of the FBI.
- 1973: The newly built FBI headquarters in Washington, D.C., was named the J. Edgar Hoover Building.
- 1974: Congress voted to honor Hoover's memory by publishing a memorial book, J. Edgar Hoover: Memorial Tributes in the Congress of the United States and Various Articles and Editorials Relating to His Life and Work.
- 1974: In Schaumburg, Illinois, a grade school was named after J. Edgar Hoover. However, in 1994, after information about Hoover's illegal activities was released, the school's name was changed to commemorate President Herbert Hoover instead.

== Theater and media portrayals ==
Hoover has been portrayed by numerous actors in films and stage productions featuring him as FBI Director. The first known portrayal was by Kent Rogers in the 1941 Looney Tunes short "Hollywood Steps Out". Some notable portrayals (listed chronologically) include:

- Hoover portrayed himself (filmed from behind) in a cameo, addressing FBI agents in the 1959 film The FBI Story.
- Dorothi Fox "portrayed" Hoover in disguise in the 1971 film Bananas.
- Broderick Crawford and James Wainwright in the Larry Cohen film The Private Files of J. Edgar Hoover (1977).
- Dolph Sweet in the television miniseries King (1978).
- Sheldon Leonard in the William Friedkin film The Brink's Job (1978).
- Ernest Borgnine in the television film Blood Feud (1983).
- Vincent Gardenia in the television miniseries Kennedy (1983).
- Jack Warden in the television film Hoover vs. The Kennedys (1987).
- Treat Williams in the television film J. Edgar Hoover (1987).
- Kevin Dunn in the film Chaplin (1992).
- Pat Hingle in the television film Citizen Cohn (1992).
- Richard Dysart in the television film Marilyn & Bobby: Her Final Affair (1993)
- Kelsey Grammer portrayed Hoover, with John Goodman as Tolson, in the Harry Shearer comic musical J. Edgar! at The Guest Quarters Suite Hotel in Santa Monica (1994).
- Richard Dysart in the theatrical film Panther (1995).
- Bob Hoskins in the Oliver Stone drama Nixon (1995).
- Wayne Tippit in two episodes of Dark Skies (1996) and (1997).
- David Fredericks in the episodes "Musings of a Cigarette Smoking Man" (1996) and "Travelers" (1998) of The X-Files.
- David Fredericks in the episode "Matryoshka" (1999) of Millennium.
- Ernest Borgnine in the theatrical film Hoover (2000).
- Larry Drake in the Robert Dyke film Timequest (2002).
- Ryan Drummond voiced him in the Bethesda Softworks game Call of Cthulhu: Dark Corners of the Earth (2005).
- Billy Crudup in the Michael Mann film Public Enemies (2009).
- Enrico Colantoni in the television miniseries The Kennedys (2011).
- Leonardo DiCaprio in the Clint Eastwood biopic J. Edgar (2011).
- William Harrison-Wallace in the Dollar Baby 2012 screen adaptation of Stephen King's short story, "The Death of Jack Hamilton" (2001).
- Rob Riggle in the "Atlanta" (2013) episode of Comedy Central's Drunk History.
- Eric Ladin in the HBO series Boardwalk Empire, season 4 (2013).
- Michael McKean in Robert Schenkkan's play All the Way at the American Repertory Theater (2013).
- Sean McNall in the movie No God, No Master (2014).
- Dylan Baker in Ava DuVernay's Martin Luther King Jr. biopic Selma (2014).
- Stephen Root in the HBO television film All the Way (2016).
- T. R. Knight in the National Geographic television series Genius (2017).
- William Forsythe in the Amazon television series The Man in the High Castle (2018).
- Stephen Stanton in the film Bad Times at the El Royale (2018)
- Martin Sheen in the film Judas and the Black Messiah (2021).
- Giacomo Baessato in the CW television series Legends of Tomorrow (2021).
- Madoka Yonezawa voices a gender-swapped Hoover in the game Fate/Grand Order, in which she is an Assassin-class servant summoned alongside Alter Ego-class servant Super Bunyan (2022).

== See also ==
- G-Man
- Harry J. Anslinger
- Helen Gandy
- McCarthyism

== Notes ==
Government offices
Preceded by William J. Burns as Director of the Bureau of Investigation	Director of the Federal Bureau of Investigation; Bureau of Investigation: 1924–1935; 1924–1972	Succeeded by Pat Gray; Acting
Honorary titles
Preceded by Everett Dirksen	Persons who have lain in state or honor in the United States Capitol rotunda May 3–4, 1972	Succeeded by Lyndon Johnson
