= Linda Royster Beito =

American political scientist

Professor Stillman College

Personal details
- Born: Tuscaloosa, Alabama
- Spouse: David T. Beito
- Children: April, Keith, Quale
- Education: University of Alabama

Linda Royster Beito is professor of political science and criminal justice at Stillman College in Tuscaloosa, Alabama.

== Biography ==
Beito was born in Tuscaloosa, Alabama. She earned her Ph.D. in political science and her master of science in criminal justice from the University of Alabama.

Since 1999, she has taught at Stillman College, where she has received several awards for excellence in teaching. She was also inducted into the Zeta Phi Beta Hall of Fame at Stillman College.

She married David T. Beito on June 11, 1997 and they live in Northport, Alabama. She has three children, April, Keith and Quale.

Her second book (co-authored by David T. Beito of the University of Alabama), T. R. M. Howard: Doctor, Entrepreneur, Civil Rights Pioneer, was published in 2018. It is a biography of civil rights leader T. R. M. Howard.

== Bibliography ==
=== Books ===
- Royster Beito, Linda (2018), T.R.M. Howard: Doctor, Entrepreneur, Civil Rights Pioneer, Oakland: Independent Institute Press, ISBN 978-1-59813-312-7
- Royster Beito, Linda (1999), Leadership Effectiveness in Community Policing, Wyndham Hall Press

=== Selected articles and chapters in collections ===
- Let Down Your Bucket Where You Are':The Afro-American Hospital and Black Health Care in Mississippi, 1924–1966, Social Science History 30 (Winter 2006), 551–69.
- [www.saf.org/journal/17/Blacks.pdf Blacks, Gun Cultures and Gun Control: T.R.M. Howard, Armed Self-Defense, and the Struggle for Civil Rights in Mississippi,] The Journal of Firearms and Public Policy (September 2005).
- Isabel Paterson, Rose Wilder Lane, and Zora Neale Hurston on War, Race, the State, and Liberty,, Independent Review 12 (Spring 2008).
- T.R.M. Howard: Pragmatism over Strict Integrationist Ideology in the Mississippi Delta, 1942–1954, Glenn Feldman, ed., Before Brown: Civil Rights and White Backlash in the Modern South, University of Alabama Press (Tuscaloosa), 2004.
- T.R.M. Howard: A Mississippi Doctor in Chicago Civil Rights, A.M.E. Church Review (July–September 2001), 51–59.
- "Rival Road Builders: Private Toll Roads in Nevada, 1852–1880,* Nevada Historical Society Quarterly 41 (Summer 1998), 71–91.
- Royster Beito, Linda (Spring 2000), "Gold Democrats and the Decline of Classical Liberalism, 1896–1900", Independent Review, 4: 555–75, archived from the original on 2014-03-26
- Royster Beito, Linda (Spring 1997), "Police Community Service: An Evaluation of Program Effectiveness", International Journal of Comparative and Applied Criminal Justice, 21
- Royster Beito, Linda (August 21, 2006), "The Christian Conservative Who Opposed the Vietnam War", History News Network
- Royster Beito, Linda, "Why It's Unlikely the Emmett Till Murder Will Ever Be Solved", History News Network
- Royster Beito, Linda, "Why the '60 Minutes' Story on Emmett Till Was a Disappointment", History News Network
- Royster Beito, Linda (May 6, 2005), "The Grim and Overlooked Anniversary of the Murder of the Rev. George W. Lee, Civil Rights Activist", History News Network
