= Harvey Richards =

American photographer and filmmaker

- Harvey Richards in 1962.
- Born: Harvey Wilson Richards; August 22, 1912; Sumpter, Oregon
- Died: April 20, 2001 (aged 88); Menlo Park, California
- Known for: Photographer, Filmmaker
- Website: Harvey Richards Media Archive

Harvey Richards (August 22, 1912 – April 20, 2001) was an American photographer and filmmaker. During his career, he produced a total of 22 documentaries of various social and political movements during the 1960s and 1970s. Richards died in April 2001 and his works are part of a collection known as the Harvey Richards Media Archive. Since 1978, his films and photographs have been licensed for use in more than 70 documentaries, books, magazine, exhibits, and television productions.

== Early life ==
Richards was born in Sumpter, Oregon in 1912. He grew up in Eugene, Oregon and left school in eighth grade to work. Richards began his career as a merchant seaman at the age of 18, sailing the Pacific, Atlantic, and Mediterranean seas, taking his first ship across the Pacific to China in 1930. He became a member of the National Maritime Union and later settled in Boston where he worked as a union organizer for the WPA and Worker's Alliance in Boston, Philadelphia, and Washington D.C.

Richards moved to San Francisco, California in 1940. Once in San Francisco, Richards worked as a machinist in the shipyards for Bethlehem Steel Corporation, installing gun turrets, diesel engines, and propellers on Liberty ships during World War II. He did not begin his career in film and photography until his mid-forties.

== Career ==
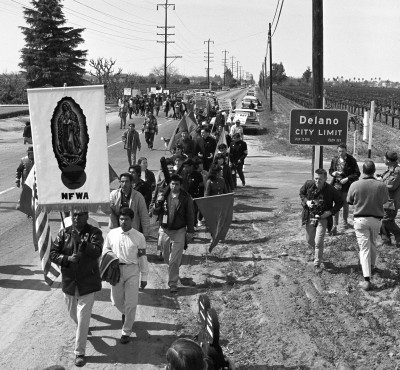
March to Sacramento Begins. March 1966, Delano, California. Photo by Harvey Richards.

Richards began photography in the 1950s, beginning with a 35-millimeter still camera. During the 1950s, he built his own studio and darkroom, developing film and print pictures. He began using motion picture cameras and supplemented his work with sound and film editing equipment. Between 1958 and 1978, Richards produced 22 documentaries, many of which deal with politics and civil rights during that era.

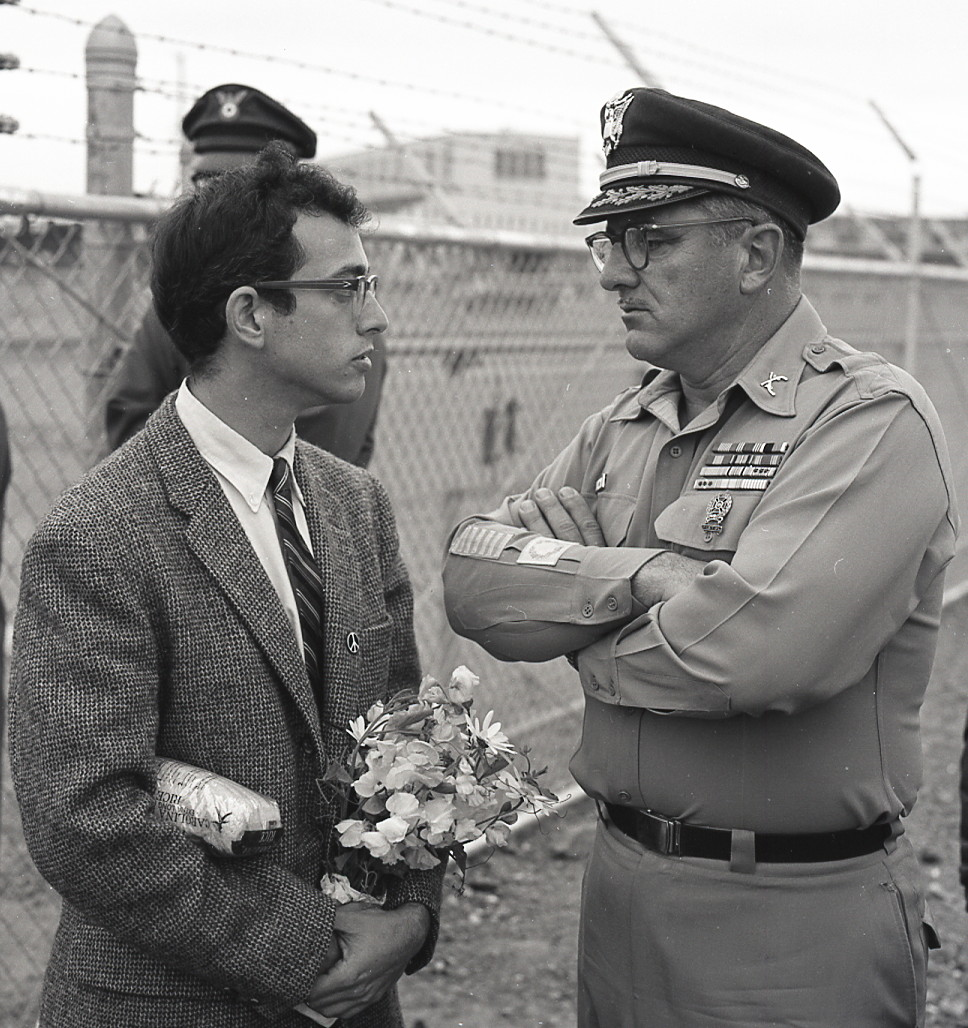
A Non-Violent Confrontation. June 1965, Oakland Army Base. Committee for Non-Violent Action offers gifts to soldiers being deployed to Vietnam. Photo by Harvey Richards.

Much of Richards's early work dealt with California farm workers and the California Farm Worker Movement. His documentaries captured worker conditions and were later distributed to union organizers. The films were not sponsored by the unions so Richards did all the filming and editing independently. The documentaries focused on working conditions and the anticipated end to the bracero labor program that began in the 1940s. He also documented the rush to implement machinery into farms in anticipation of higher labor costs.

From the late 1950s to mid-1960s, Richards focused his documentaries on the Civil Rights Movement in the United States. He filmed in various locations including San Francisco and the southern United States in places such as Mississippi. He covered protests in the San Francisco Bay Area in support of civil rights. Richards also documented the stories of sharecroppers who fought for voting rights in the State of Mississippi.

Richards filmed a series of documentaries in the 1960s and 1970s dealing with environmental issues, mainly Deforestation in the United States and pollution in the San Francisco Bay. He also covered various protests of the Vietnam War, and documented the founding of Women Strike for Peace in 1961. His documentary Warning Warning was also used to help build support for the nonprofit organization Save the Bay.

== Later life and death ==
Richards died in 2001. He was survived by his wife Alice Schott Richards (who died in 2011), and his two sons, Paul and Steffen Richards.

== Filmography ==
Year	Title	Notes
1959	Factory Farms	Documentary film of California farm labor
1960	The Harvesters	Documentary about mechanizing the California agriculture labor force
1960	Perch of the Devil: The Copper Strike of 1959	Butte, Montana, The Richest Hill on Earth
1962	Uno Veintecino: the Lettuce Strike of 1962	Documentary of the 1962 AFL-CIO strike over pay for lettuce pickers in California
1962	Everyman	Everyman Protested Nuclear Testing
1962	Women for Peace	The founding of Women Strike for Peace to protest Nuclear Testing
1962	A Visit to the Soviet Union, Part 1: Women of Russia	Women and Children in the Soviet Union: A Socialist Alternative
1962	A Visit to the Soviet Union, Part 2: Far from Moscow	Ordinary People in the Soviet Union: Tashkent and Irkutsk
1963	Freedom March	San Francisco 1963 Freedom March in Support of Civil Rights in Birmingham, Alabama
1963	Freedom Bound	Share Croppers and Voter Registration Activists Tell Their Stories.
1963	We'll Never Turn Back	Share Croppers and Voter Registration Activists Tell Their Stories.
1963	The Stump Makers	Wasteful forestry practices and the harmful impact of clear cutting.
1964	Dream Deferred	Documentary film for the Student Nonviolent Coordinating Committee for registration vote drive, filmed just prior to the Freedom Summer in Mississippi in 1964
1964	Wasted Woods	Wasted Woods: "Cut and Get Out. After Us, the Deluge and the Desert."
1965	Decision in the Streets	1960’s Bay Area Peace and Civil Rights Protests in the Streets, including the Free Speech Movement in Berkeley
1965	Hot Damn!	1965 Anti-War Protests in the San Francisco Bay Area
1966	This Land Is Rich	Documentary film on the Delano grape strike and the farm worker march to Sacramento in 1965 and 1966.
1968	No Greater Cause and Faces of Vietnam War Protest	Documentary film on protests against the war in Vietnam
1970	Warning Warning	Pollution and Land Filling Threaten San Francisco Bay
1971	Timber Tigers	Deforestation: "After us, the deluge and the desert."
1975	Vanishing Redwoods	Clear Cutting Threatens the Survival of the Species
1978	Tale of Ruin, Capitalism and World Resources	Capitalism Destroys the Earth

== Legacy and the Harvey Richards Media Archive ==
In 1987, Richards turned his films and photos over to his son Paul Richards who formed Estuary Press to license and publish the films and images. Harvey Richards still images are archived on the Harvey Richards Media website. His most famous photo of Dolores Huerta during the 1965 grape strike was displayed at the Smithsonian Institution in its "One Life: Dolores Huerta" exhibit. Paul also authored Critical Focus, The Black and White Photographs of Harvey Wilson Richards, a book with images of his father's work from the 1960s and 1970s. The book was published in 1987, the same year the photos and films became available for licensing through the Harvey Richards Media Archive.

Since 1978, his film and photos have been licensed for use in more than 70 documentaries, books, magazine, exhibits, and television productions. Two featured films that used his footage include Fear and Loathing in Las Vegas and Eyes on the Prize, a 14-hour PBS Documentary.
