= David T. Beito =

American historian (born 1956)

- Born: 1956 (age 69–70); Minneapolis, Minnesota, U.S.
- Education: University of Minnesota (BA); University of Wisconsin–Madison (PhD)
- Occupation: Historian
- Spouse: Linda Royster Beito (m. 1997)
- Writing career
- Notable awards: American Book Fest, winner for best biography (2020), finalist for best nonfiction (2023) and Independent Book Publishers Association, winner for best biography (2019).
- Website: Website

David T. Beito (born 1956) is an American Classical Liberal historian and professor emeritus of history at the University of Alabama.

== Life and career ==
Beito was born in Minneapolis, Minnesota. He received a B.A. in history from the University of Minnesota in 1980 and a Ph.D. in history from the University of Wisconsin–Madison in 1986. Since 1994, he has taught at the University of Alabama, where he is a professor in history. He married Linda Royster Beito on June 11, 1997, and they live in Northport, Alabama.

Beito's research covers a wide range of topics in American history including race, tax revolts, the private provision of infrastructure, mutual aid, and the political philosophies of Zora Neale Hurston, Rose Wilder Lane, and Isabel Paterson.

Beito has been published in the Wall Street Journal, Los Angeles Times, Washington Examiner, The Hill, as well as the Journal of Southern History, Journal of Urban History among other scholarly journals. He has received fellowships from the Earhart Foundation, the John M. Olin Foundation, and the Institute for Humane Studies.

In February 2007, Beito was appointed to chair the Alabama State Advisory Committee of the United States Commission on Civil Rights. In April 2008, the Committee had an open meeting at the 16th Street Baptist Church in Birmingham which focused on eminent domain as a possible civi rights issue. It followed this up with another open meeting in April 2009 in Montgomery. The testimony resulted in a national briefing by Beito for the U.S. Commission on Civil Rights. generated stories by ABC News, Fox News, and other outlets.

Beito's biography of Dr. T. R. M. Howard received widespread praise. Mark Bauerlein in a review for the Wall Street Journal called it "compelling," civil rights leader Julian Bond characterized it as "wonderfully told," former NAACP head Benjamin L. Hooks lauded it as a "must read," and Shelby Steele found it to be "richly detailed."

T.R.M. Howard: Doctor, Entrepreneur, Civil Rights Pioneer won the best book award in the category for biography by the American Book Fest and the Independent Book Publishers Association. His most recent book, The New Deal's War on the Bill of Rights: The Untold Story of FDR's Concentration Camps, Censorship and Mass Surveillance has received praise from a broad spectrum of scholars including Ellen Schrecker, Randy Barnett, and Burton W. Folsom Jr.

Several historians have favorably reviewed Beito's most recent book, FDR: A New Political Life. David Michaelis, a biographer of Eleanor Roosevelt, states that in "this instructive and revelatory history, David Beito takes us further than his predecessors along the breadcrumb path into Franklin Roosevelt's 'thickly forested interior'.'" Burton W. Folsom Jr. asserts that "David Beito's wonderful new work is to make a historiographic leap from the Dark Ages to the Atomic Age." In his assessment of the book, Richard K. Vedder, the author of Out of Work: Government and Unemployment in the Twentieth Century, "David Beito, one of the premier chroniclers of American life in the first half of the twentieth century, has worked his magic again."

== Views ==
Beito is critical of United States President Franklin D. Roosevelt and his legacy. In two of his books, New Deal's War on The Bill of Rights (2023) and FDR: A New Political Life (2025), he refutes Roosevelt's legacy as a Wartime President with a major role in ending the Great Depression, portraying him as an authoritarian that violated the civil rights of minorities - as in the case of Internment of Japanese Americans, expanded surveillance, and violated the two term tradition.

== Publications ==
=== Books ===
- Taxpayers in Revolt: Tax Resistance during the Great Depression, University of North Carolina Press (Chapel Hill), 1989.
- From Mutual Aid to the Welfare State: Fraternal Societies and Social Services, 1890-1967, University of North Carolina Press, 2000. ISBN 9780807848418
- Black Maverick: T. R. M. Howard's Fight for Civil Rights and Economic Power (University of Illinois Press), 2009, ISBN 978-0252034206
- T.R.M. Howard: Doctor, Entrepreneur, Civil Rights Pioneer (Oakland: Independent Institute), 2018. ISBN 978-1598133127.
- Beito, David T. (2023). The New Deal's War on the Bill of Rights: The Untold Story of FDR's Concentration Camps, Censorship, and Mass Surveillance (First ed.). Oakland: Independent Institute. pp. 4–7. ISBN 978-1598133561.
- Beito, David T. (2025). FDR: A New Political Life (First ed.). Chicago: Carus Books. ISBN 978-1637700693.

=== Edited books ===
- The Voluntary City: Choice, Community, and Civil Society, University of Michigan Press for The Independent Institute (Ann Arbor), 2002.

== Reviews of Beito's work and interviews ==
- Mark Bauerlin, "Demanding Rights, Courting Controversy: A Flamboyant Civil-Rights Leader – Doctor, Orator, Activist-Finally Gets His Due", The Wall Street Journal, August 6, 2009.
- "Six Questions for David Beito, Author of Black Maverick", by Scott Horton, Harper's Magazine, June 11, 2009.
