= T. R. M. Howard =

American physician and civil rights leader (1908–1976)

- Born: Theodore Roosevelt Mason Howard; March 4, 1908; Murray, Kentucky, U.S.
- Died: May 1, 1976 (aged 68); Chicago, Illinois, U.S.
- Education: Oakwood University; Union College of Lincoln; College of Medical Evangelists
- Scientific career
- Fields: Surgeon

Theodore Roosevelt Mason Howard (March 4, 1908 – May 1, 1976) was an American civil rights leader, fraternal organization leader, entrepreneur and surgeon. He was a mentor to activists such as Medgar Evers, Charles Evers, Fannie Lou Hamer, Amzie Moore, Aaron Henry, and Jesse Jackson, whose efforts gained local and national attention leading up to the civil rights movement of the 1960s.

Howard founded Mississippi's leading civil rights organization in the 1950s, the Regional Council of Negro Leadership; and played a prominent role in the investigation of the kidnapping and murder of Emmett Till in the late 1950s. He was also president of the National Medical Association, chairman of the board of the National Negro Business League, and a leading national advocate of African-American businesses. His contributions were clearly not only in a clinical setting, but also in his addressing of social determinants of health that disproportionately impact the black community.

== Early life and education ==
Howard was born on March 4, 1908, in Murray, Kentucky, to Arthur Howard, a tobacco twister, and Mary Chandler, a cook for Will Mason, a prominent local white doctor and member of the Seventh-day Adventist Church. Mason took note of the boy's work habits, talent, ambition, and charm. He put him to work in his hospital and eventually paid for much of his medical education. Howard later showed his gratitude by adding "Mason" as a second middle name.

His medical career was fostered out of his relationship to Mason, as he worked closely with Mason as his protége. Howard attended three Adventist colleges: Oakwood Junior College, a historically black college in Huntsville, Alabama; the nearly all-white Union College in Lincoln, Nebraska; and the College of Medical Evangelists (now Loma Linda University) in Loma Linda, California. While at Union College, he won the Anti-Saloon League of America's national contest for best orator in 1930.

During his years in medical school in California, Howard took part in civil rights and political causes and wrote a regular column for the California Eagle, the main black newspaper of Los Angeles. He was president of the California Economic, Commercial, and Political League. Through the League and his columns, he championed black business ownership, the study of black history, and opposed local efforts to introduce segregation.

In 1935, he married prominent black socialite Helen Nela Boyd; they were married 41 years. After a residency at Homer G. Phillips Hospital (in St. Louis, Missouri), Howard became the medical director of the Riverside Sanitarium, the main Adventist health care institution to serve African Americans.

== Career ==
Mason quickly took notice of Howard's intelligence and was a supporter of his education and medical training. This led Howard to his position as the chief medical director and surgeon at an Adventist sanitarium in Nashville, Tennessee. Like countless other Black medical professionals of this time, he was met with extreme resentment and discrimination from his colleagues. The turmoil was so great that Howard transferred, in 1942, to the hospital of the International Order of Twelve Knights and Daughters of Tabor and took over as the first chief surgeon.

The IOTKDT is a fraternal organization, in Mound Bayou, Mississippi, founded, occupied and governed by freedmen after the Civil War. Howard had already been an active participant in the civil rights movement, but it was here that his activist and medical philosophies began to intersect, especially in his considerations of medical inequity and social determinants of health. Howard is known for energizing the city's agricultural economy by introducing jobs, livestock, and new farming equipment to his over 1,000 acres of farmland.

He also founded an insurance company, restaurant, hospital, home construction firm, and a large farm where he raised cattle, quail, hunting dogs, and cotton. He also built a small zoo and a park, as well as the first swimming pool for Black people in Mississippi. "In addition to his duties at the hospital, Howard operated a thriving private practice, where his specialties soon included the discreet provision of illegal abortions (for both black and white patients), a practice he justified as a matter of both individual rights and family planning. (He also favored legalizing prostitution, arguing that man's sinful nature made it impossible to suppress the sex trade.)"

In 1947, he broke with the Knights and Daughters after backlash from the IOTKDT over his popular status. This led to his creation of a competing organization, The United Order of Friendship America (UOFA).

He created the "Friendship Medical Clinics" that provided medical services for the Black community that were otherwise very difficult to attain. His patients were from all backgrounds, however, and expanded on ideals of medical equality and national health that he saw were absent. His efforts also included initiatives for education, voting rights, and employment for the black community. He was also involved in several rallies that attracted civil rights leaders from across the nation as well as politicians and celebrities. From this, Howard gained more public attention, and was even featured in an article in the Saturday Evening Post by Pulitzer Prize-winning publisher Hodding Carter II. He sought the support of political actors for his public health endeavors, most famously in his failed attempt to erect a Veteran's Hospital with the help of two white supremacist Senators. This demonstrated his desire to close the ideological divides in politics and hopefully foster relationships with his opponents.

Howard rose to prominence as a civil rights leader after founding the Regional Council of Negro Leadership (RCNL) in 1951. His compatriots in the League included Medgar Evers, whom Howard had hired as an agent for his Magnolia Mutual Life Insurance Company; and Aaron Henry, a future leader in the Mississippi Freedom Democratic Party.

Arenia Mallory, a principal of a private black school in the county seat Lexington, Mississippi, was also on the board of directors of the RCNL. The RCNL mounted a successful boycott against service stations that denied restrooms to African Americans and distributed twenty thousand bumper stickers with the slogan, "Don't Buy Gas Where You Can't Use the Restroom." The organization frequently organized popular demonstrations supporting civil rights and voter registration. The success of the RCNL threatened white citizens in Mississippi for several reasons, but especially in the organization's success in improving black voter registration. By 1954, there were more than 20,000 newly registered black voters in Mississippi.

The RCNL organized yearly rallies in Mound Bayou for civil rights. Sometimes as many as ten thousand attended, including such future activists as Fannie Lou Hamer and Amzie Moore. Speakers included Rep. William L. Dawson of Chicago, Alderman Archibald J. Carey Jr. of Chicago, Rep. Charles Diggs of Michigan, and NAACP attorney Thurgood Marshall. One of the entertainers was Mahalia Jackson.

In 1954, Howard hatched a plan to fight a credit squeeze by the White Citizens Councils against civil rights activists in Mississippi. At his suggestion, the NAACP under Roy Wilkins encouraged businesses, churches, and voluntary associations to transfer their accounts to the black-owned Tri-State Bank of Memphis. In turn, the bank made funds available for loans to victims of the economic squeeze in Mississippi.

=== Emmett Till ===
Howard moved into the national limelight after the murder of Emmett Till in August 1955 and the trial of his killers, J. W. Milam and Roy Bryant, in September. He delivered "[o]ne of the earliest and loudest denunciations of Till's murder," saying that if "the slaughtering of Negroes is allowed to continue, Mississippi will have a civil war. Negroes are only going to take so much." He was deeply involved in the search for evidence in the case. He allowed his home to be a "black command center" for witnesses and journalists, including Clotye Murdock Larsson of Ebony magazine and Rep. Charles Diggs. "Recognizing that local officials had little incentive to identify or punish every member of the conspiracy that took Till's life, he spearheaded a private investigation, personally helping to locate, interview, and protect several important witnesses."

Visitors noticed the high level of security, including armed guards and a plethora of weapons. Historians David T. Beito and Linda Royster Beito have written that Howard's residence "was so impregnable that journalists and politicians from a later era might have used the word 'compound' rather than 'home' to describe it." Howard evaded Mississippi's discriminatory gun control laws by hiding a pistol in a secret compartment of his car, and "slept with a Thompson submachine gun at the foot of his bed." He brought Emmett's mother Mamie to the city from Chicago at his own expense, and she stayed at his home when she came to testify at the trial. Howard "escorted [Bradley] and various others to and from the courthouse in a heavily-armed caravan." Like many black journalists and political leaders, Howard alleged that more than two people took part in the crime.

After an all-white jury acquitted Milam and Bryant, Howard gave dozens of speeches around the country on the Till killing and other violence in Mississippi, typically to crowds of several thousand. One was to an overflow crowd on November 27 in Montgomery, Alabama, at the Dexter Avenue Baptist Church. His host for the event was Martin Luther King Jr., with Rosa Parks in the audience. Many years later, she singled out Howard's appearance as the "first mass meeting that we had in Montgomery" following Till's death. Four days after his speech, Parks made history by refusing to give her seat on a city bus in Montgomery to a white man, in violation of a city segregation ordinance.

Howard's speaking tour culminated in a rally for twenty thousand at Madison Square Garden, where he was the featured speaker. He shared the stage with Adam Clayton Powell Jr., A. Philip Randolph, former First Lady Eleanor Roosevelt, and Autherine Lucy.

In the final months of 1955, Howard and his family were increasingly subjected to death threats and economic pressure. He sold most of his property and moved permanently to Chicago. His national reputation as a civil rights leader still seemed secure. He accused J. Edgar Hoover, Director of the FBI, of being slow to find killers of African Americans in the South.

In early 1956, the Chicago Defender gave Howard the top spot on its annual national honor roll. He founded the Howard Medical Center on the South Side and served for one year as president of the National Medical Association, the black counterpart of the AMA.

Howard also became medical director of S.B. Fuller Products Company. Samuel B. Fuller was likely the wealthiest black man in the United States at the time.

=== Politics ===
Howard was unusual among prominent civil rights leaders because he strongly opposed socialism. He consistently praised the educator Booker T. Washington, late president of the Tuskegee Institute, whom he regarded as a "towering genius" for his emphasis on self-help and entrepreneurship. He "had little patience for the utopian schemes of the far left, declaring at one point that he wished 'one bomb could be fashioned that would blow every Communist in America right back to Russia where they belong.' In a similar vein, he said, 'There is not a thing wrong with Mississippi today that real Jeffersonian democracy and the religion of Jesus Christ cannot solve'."

His medical and political endeavors exposed him to the generational poverty among the black community in Mound Bayou, Mississippi, leading him to give public support for the desegregation of schools. Once the decision of Brown v. Board of Education was public, there was increasing violence aimed at members of the UOFA and Howard himself. Despite this, Howard continued to fight for educational and medical equity and, as mentioned, was integral in the investigation and trial of the murder of Emmett Till.

In 1958, Howard ran for Congress as a Republican against the powerful incumbent black Democrat, Rep. William L. Dawson, a close ally of Mayor Richard J. Daley. Although he received much favorable media publicity, and support from leading black opponents of the Daley machine, Dawson overwhelmed him at the polls. Howard was unable to counter Dawson's efficient political organization, and rising voter discontent because of the economic recession and the reluctance of Republican President Dwight D. Eisenhower to back the civil rights movement in the South. Black Republicans began to believe they were not well represented by that party.

Shortly before the election, Howard helped to found the Chicago League of Negro Voters. The League generally opposed the Daley organization and promoted the election of black candidates in both parties. It nurtured the black independent movement of the 1960s and 1970s, which eventually propelled four of Howard's friends to higher office: Ralph Metcalfe, Charles Hayes, and Gus Savage to Congress, and Harold Washington as mayor of Chicago.

In the two decades after the 1958 election, Howard had little role as a national leader, but he remained important locally. He chaired a Chicago committee in 1965 to raise money for the children of the recently assassinated black leader, Malcolm X. Later, he was an early contributor to the Chicago chapter of the SCLC's Operation Breadbasket under Jesse Jackson. In 1971, Operation PUSH was founded in Howard's Chicago home, and he chaired the organization's finance committee.

Through this period, he became well known as a leading abortion provider, although the procedure was still illegal until 1973, when the Supreme Court ruled in Roe v. Wade that women had a right to this procedure. He was arrested in 1964 and 1965 for allegedly performing abortions in Chicago but was never convicted. Howard regarded this work as complementary to his earlier civil rights activism. His medical philosophy and commitment to medical equity clearly shaped his political motivations. The challenges he faced in his career are a testament to his commitment to change and fearlessness amidst a tumultuous and divided political era.

Electoral history

Year	Office	Republican	%	Democratic	%
1958	U.S House of Representatives, Illinois, District 1	T.R.M Howard	27.8%	√ William Dawson	72.2%

=== Friendship Medical Center ===
In 1972, Howard founded the multi-million-dollar Friendship Medical Center on the South Side, the largest privately owned black clinic in Chicago. The staff of about 160 included 27 doctors in such fields as pediatrics, dental care, a pharmacy, ENT (ear, nose, and throat) care, and psychological and drug counseling.

Within an hour after the decision in Roe v. Wade was announced in 1973, FMC performed the first legal abortions in Illinois. After a spate of bad publicity, "Howard stated that the FMC had performed 1,500 legal abortions thus far, more than any other Illinois provider. Given such numbers, he concluded, six major complications were not unusual." Howard also believed the various controversies were "a smokescreen by the medical and political establishment to quash their lower-priced competitors" because "an abortion at the FMC cost about fifty dollars less than at hospitals." He also felt the push to require abortions to be performed only in hospitals would "push the already limited capacity of hospitals beyond the breaking point." One local hospital had been performing 18 abortions per week, whereas FMC had been set up to perform 60–100 abortions per day.

In 1978, the Chicago Sun-Times published a 15-part series titled The Abortion Profiteers, exposing the dirty underbelly of the abortion industry in Chicago. Dr. Arnold Bickham — a doctor who worked at Howard's Friendship Medical Center performing abortions from 1973 to 1975, and who went on to run several other abortion clinics, including one he also named "Friendship Medical Center" after Howard's death — was one of several Chicago-area abortion practitioners featured in the 1978 investigative report. The reporters stated that three women died from hemorrhages in 1973 and 1974 after abortions at FMC, and several others died after abortions at Bickham's other clinics, Biogen and Water Tower. After a history of license suspensions, gross malpractice, and federal convictions for misuse of funds, in 1989 Bickham was arrested for practicing medicine without a license while trying to flee his "Friendship Medical Center" clinic.

== Death ==
Howard died in Chicago on May 1, 1976, after many years of deteriorating health. The Reverend Jesse Jackson officiated at the funeral.

== Depictions ==
Howard is portrayed by Roger Guenveur Smith in the film Till (2022), a dramatization of the Emmett Till case.

== See also ==
- List of civil rights leaders
