= Darling, Mississippi =

- CDP
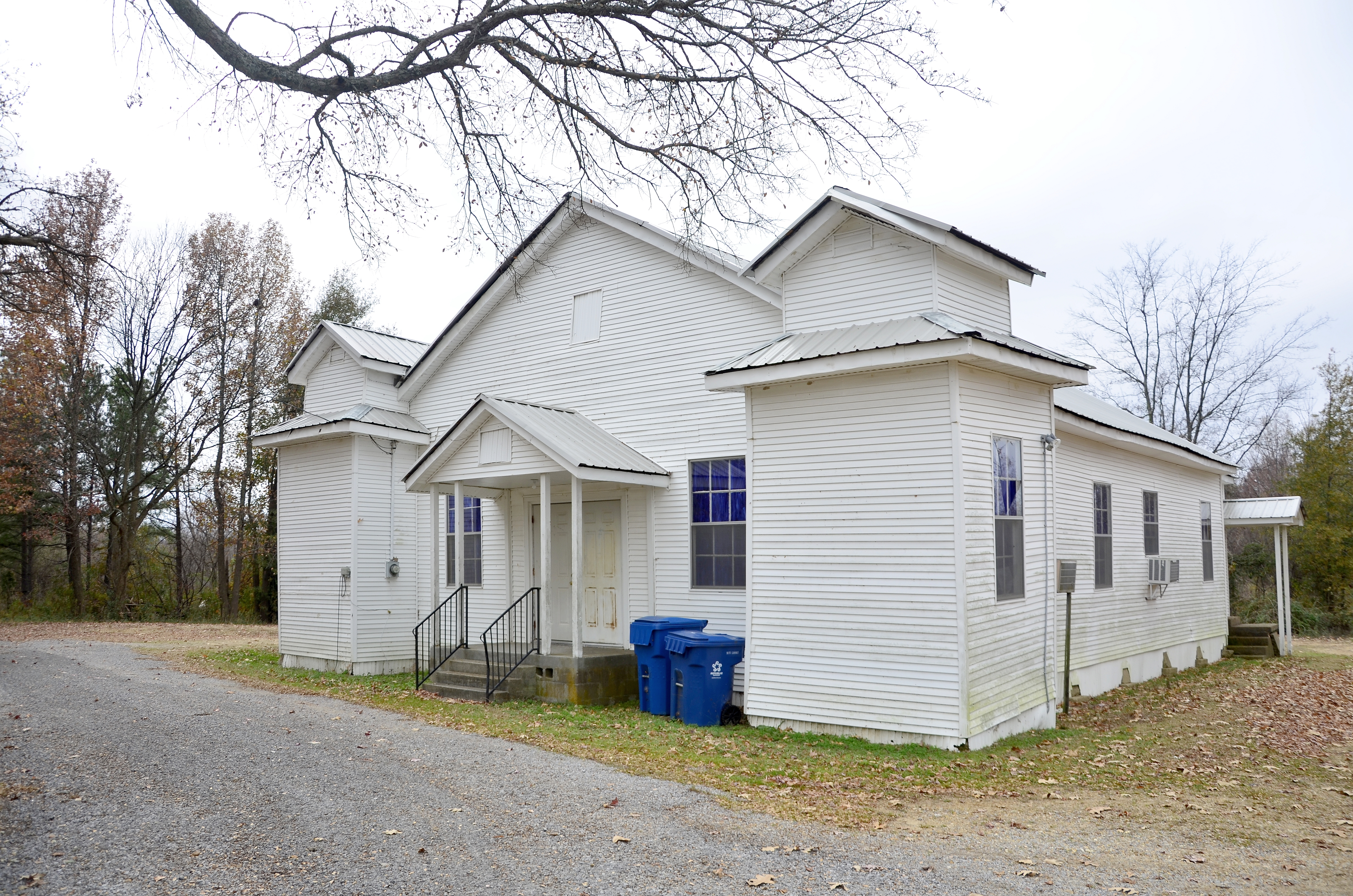
- Greater Zion Missionary Baptist Church in Darling

- Location within Mississippi
- Coordinates: 34°22′02″N 90°16′51″W
- Country: United States
- State: Mississippi
- County: Quitman

Area
  - Total: 2.71 sq mi (7.01 km^{2})
  - Land: 2.71 sq mi (7.01 km^{2})
  - Water: 0 sq mi (0.00 km^{2})
- Elevation: 167 ft (51 m)

Population (2020)
  - Total: 154
  - Density: 56.9/sq mi (21.96/km^{2})
- Time zone: UTC-6 (Central (CST))
  - Summer (DST): UTC-5 (CDT)
- Area code: 662
- GNIS feature ID: 2586589

Darling is a census-designated place (CDP) in Quitman County, Mississippi. Darling is located on Mississippi Highway 3, north of Marks. Per the 2020 Census, the population was 154.

The settlement was named after Mr. Darling, a railroad official.

== Education ==
It is in the Quitman County School District.

== Demographics ==
Historical population
| Census | Pop. | Note | %± |
|---|---|---|---|
| 2010 | 226 | | — |
| 2020 | 154 | | −31.9% |
U.S. Decennial Census; 2010 2020

Darling first appeared as a census designated place in the 2010 U.S. census.

=== Racial and ethnic composition ===
Darling CDP, Mississippi – Racial and ethnic composition Note: the US Census treats Hispanic/Latino as an ethnic category. This table excludes Latinos from the racial categories and assigns them to a separate category. Hispanics/Latinos may be of any race.
| Race / Ethnicity (NH = Non-Hispanic) | Pop 2010 | Pop 2020 | % 2010 | % 2020 |
|---|---|---|---|---|
| White alone (NH) | 32 | 19 | 14.16% | 12.34% |
| Black or African American alone (NH) | 189 | 130 | 83.63% | 84.42% |
| Native American or Alaska Native alone (NH) | 0 | 0 | 0.00% | 0.00% |
| Asian alone (NH) | 0 | 1 | 0.00% | 0.65% |
| Native Hawaiian or Pacific Islander alone (NH) | 0 | 0 | 0.00% | 0.00% |
| Other race alone (NH) | 0 | 0 | 0.00% | 0.00% |
| Mixed race or Multiracial (NH) | 0 | 4 | 0.00% | 2.60% |
| Hispanic or Latino (any race) | 5 | 0 | 2.21% | 0.00% |
| Total | 226 | 154 | 100.00% | 100.00% |

== Transportation ==
Amtrak’s City of New Orleans, which operates between New Orleans and Chicago, passes through the town on CN tracks, but makes no stop. The nearest station is located in Marks, 7 miles (11 km) to the south.

== Notable person ==
- Super Chikan, blues guitarist
