= National Register of Historic Places listings in Quitman County, Mississippi =

Location of Quitman County in Mississippi

This is a list of the National Register of Historic Places listings in Quitman County, Mississippi.

This is intended to be a complete list of the properties and districts on the National Register of Historic Places in Quitman County, Mississippi, United States. Latitude and longitude coordinates are provided for many National Register properties and districts; these locations may be seen together in a map.

There are 5 properties and districts listed on the National Register in the county.

This National Park Service list is complete through NPS recent listings posted July 31, 2026.

== Current listings ==
	Name on the Register	Image	Date listed	Location	City or town	Description
1	Denton Site		February 2, 1979 (#79001335)	Northeastern quarter of the southwestern quarter of Section 5, Township 26 North, Range 1 West; 34°09′08″N 90°19′24″W	Denton	
2	Marks Downtown Historic District		March 11, 2024 (#100010020)	Main, Chestnut, Peach, Maple, Poplar, Walnut, Third, First, and Lamar/Pecan Streets; 34°15′24″N 90°16′20″W	Marks	
3	Norman Site		May 2, 1975 (#75001057)	Northwestern quarter of the northeastern quarter of Section 19, Township 26 North, Range 2 West; 34°06′57″N 90°26′33″W	Lambert	
4	Posey Site (22QU500)		September 11, 1986 (#86002326)	Northwestern quarter of the northeastern quarter of Section 4, Township 28 North, Range 1 West; 34°19′59″N 90°18′09″W	Marks	
5	Shady Grove Site (22QU525)		September 11, 1986 (#86002316)	Southwestern quarter of the northeastern quarter of Township 27 North, Range 1 West; 34°11′02″N 90°17′06″W	Marks	

== See also ==
- List of National Historic Landmarks in Mississippi
- National Register of Historic Places listings in Mississippi
