= Sarah, Mississippi =

- Unincorporated community
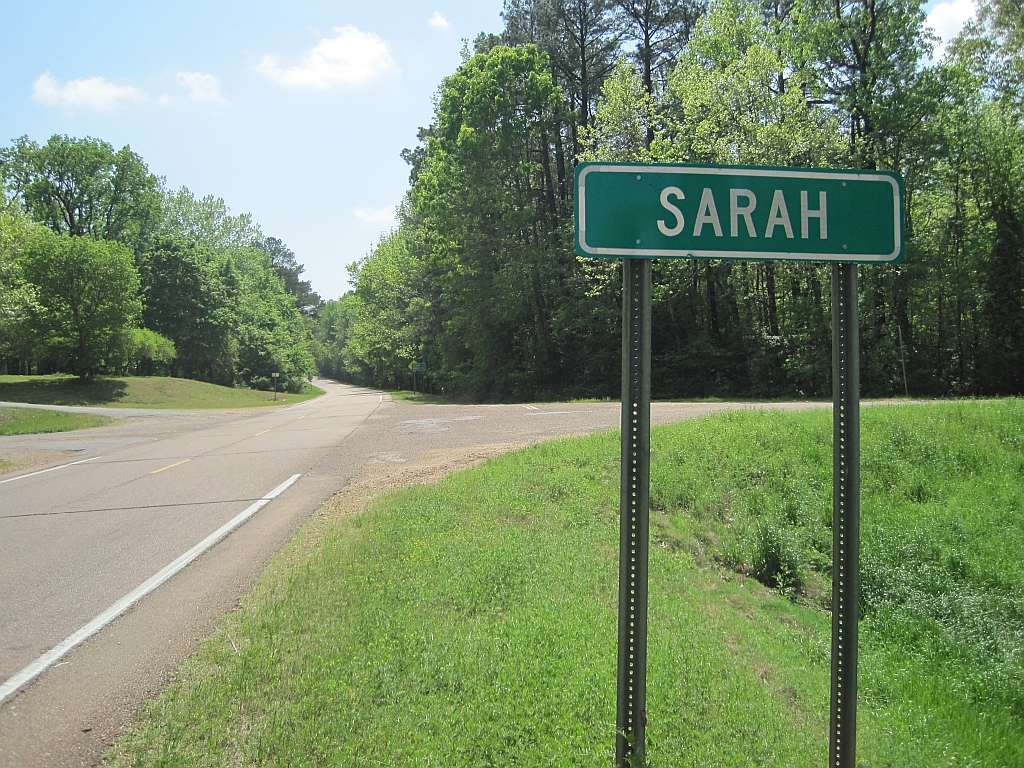
- Highway sign outside of Sarah

- Location within Mississippi Location within the United States
- Coordinates: 34°34′10″N 90°12′37″W
- Country: United States
- State: Mississippi
- County: Tate
- Elevation: 184 ft (56 m)
- Time zone: UTC-6 (Central (CST))
  - Summer (DST): UTC-5 (CDT)
- ZIP code: 38665
- Area code: 662
- GNIS feature ID: 677408

Sarah is an unincorporated community in Tate County, Mississippi, United States. Sarah is located approximately 5 miles (8.0 km) south of Savage and 3 miles (4.8 km) north of Askew along Mississippi Highway 3.

Although an unincorporated community, Sarah has a post office and a zip code of 38665.

== Education ==
The Sarah community is served by the Tate County School District.

== Transportation ==
- Mississippi Highway 3
- Amtrak’s City of New Orleans, which operates between New Orleans and Chicago, passes through the town on CN tracks, but makes no stop. The nearest station is located in Marks, 24 miles (39 km) to the south.

== Notoriety ==
On 25 April 2001, Jan Michael Brawner Jr. murdered his father-in-law (Carl Albert Craft), mother-in-law (Martha Jane Craft), ex-wife (Barbara Faye Craft Brawner) and his 3-year-old daughter (Candice Paige Brawner) at the Craft home in the Sarah Community. Brawner was found guilty on four counts of capital murder by jury trial in the Circuit Court of Tate County and was sentenced to death. Brawner was executed by lethal injection at Mississippi State Penitentiary on 12 June 2012.

== Gallery ==
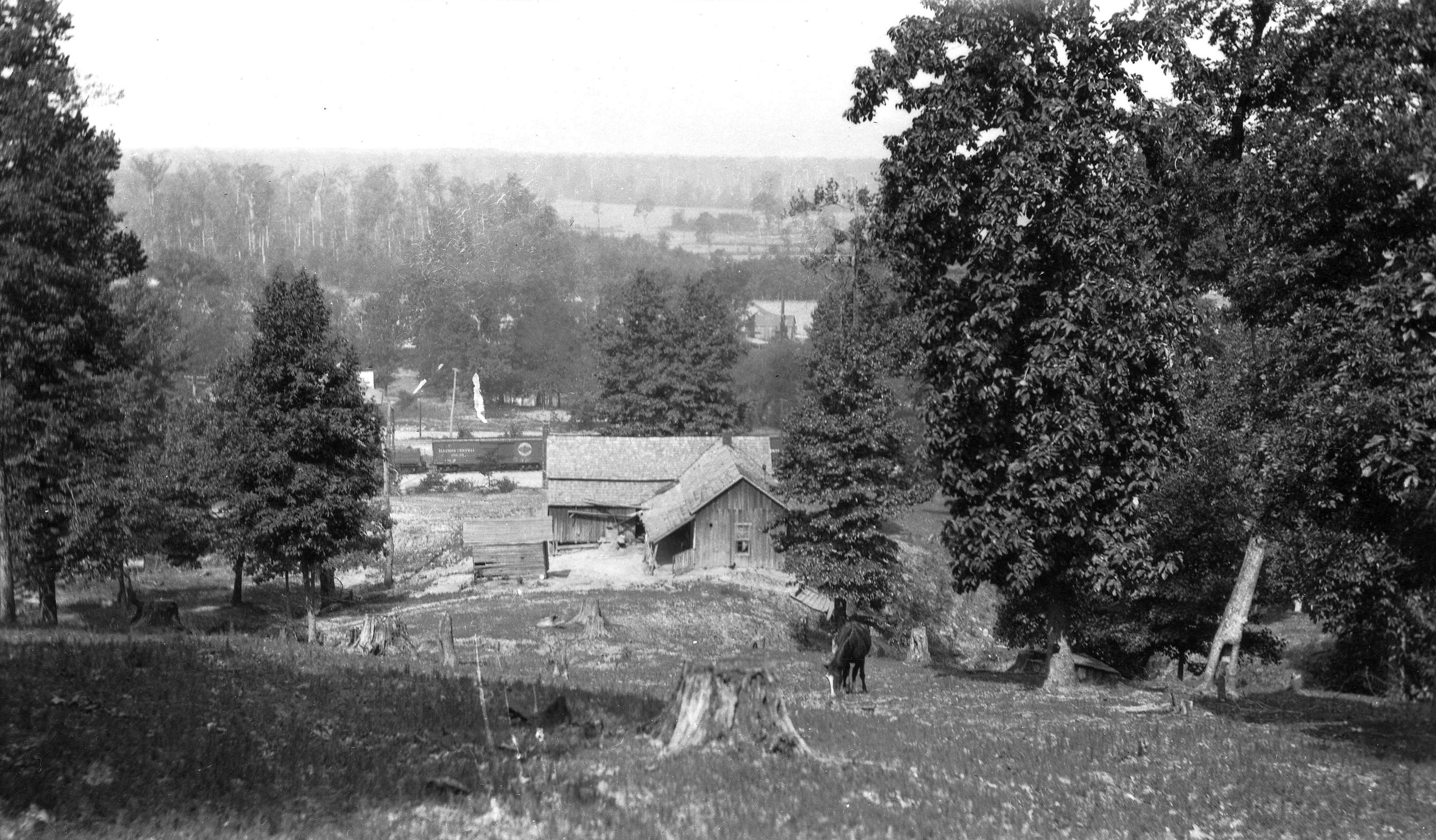
View from hill above Sarah,
circa 1920

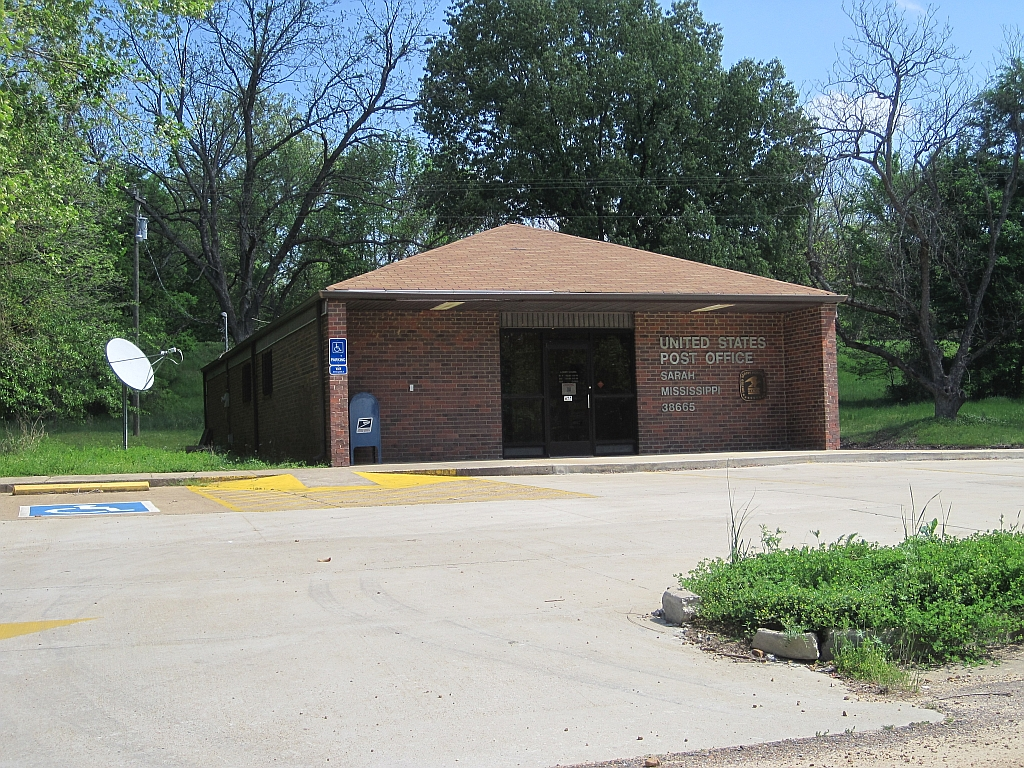
US Post Office,
Sarah, Mississippi
