= Oliverfried, Mississippi =

Unincorporated community in Mississippi, United States

- Unincorporated community
- Location within Mississippi Location within the United States
- Coordinates: 34°10′25″N 90°17′52″W
- Country: United States
- State: Mississippi
- County: Quitman
- Elevation: 154 ft (47 m)
- Time zone: UTC-6 (Central (CST))
  - Summer (DST): UTC-5 (CDT)
- Area code: 662
- GNIS feature ID: 683762

Oliverfried is an unincorporated community in Quitman County, Mississippi. Oliverfried is located on Mississippi Highway 3, south of Lambert.

Oliverfried is located on the Canadian National Railway.
