= Prichard, Mississippi =

- Unincorporated community
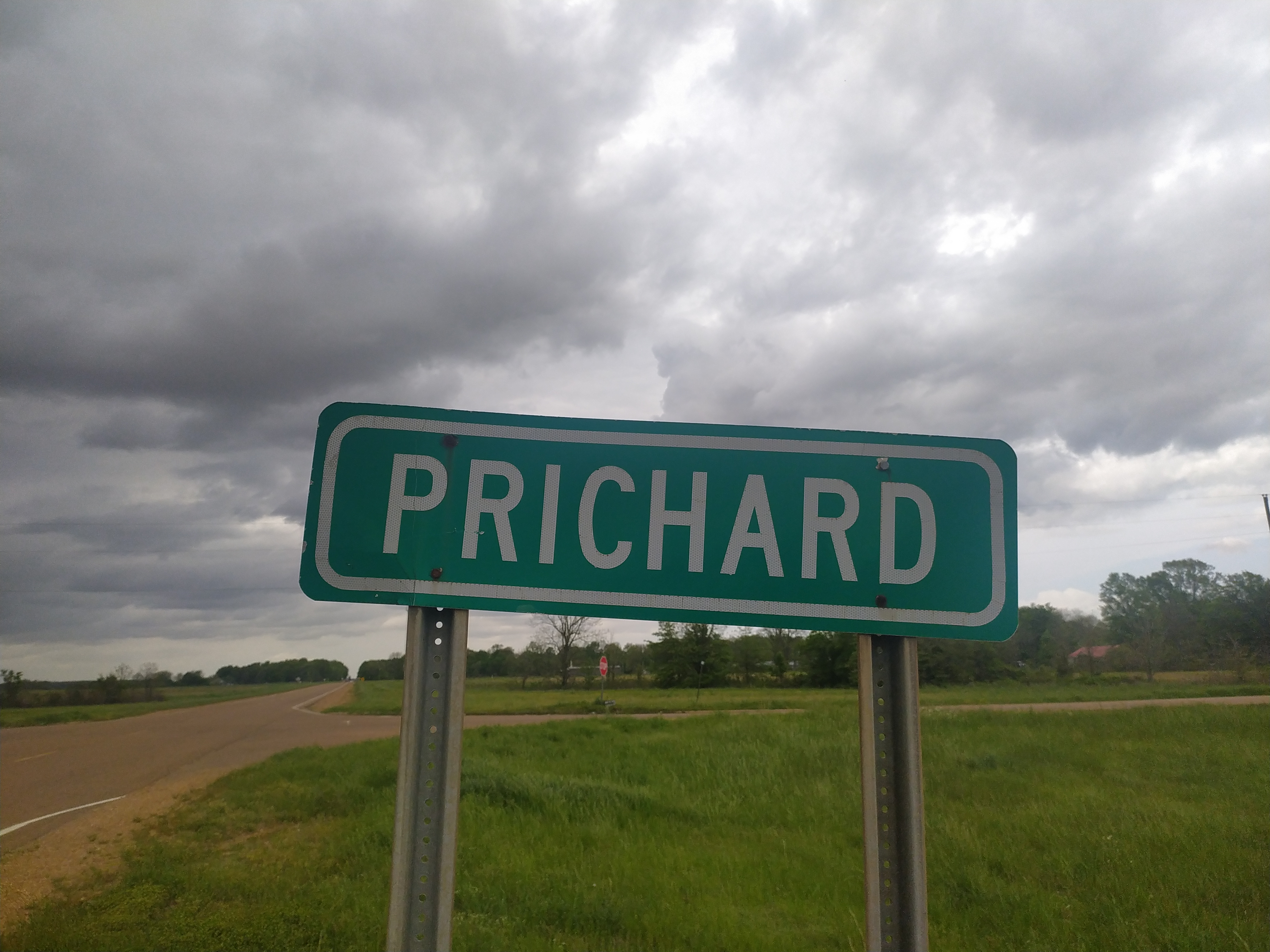
- Highway sign in Prichard

- Location within Mississippi Location within the United States
- Coordinates: 34°41′58″N 90°14′39″W
- Country: United States
- State: Mississippi
- County: Tunica
- Elevation: 187 ft (57 m)
- Time zone: UTC-6 (Central (CST))
  - Summer (DST): UTC-5 (CDT)
- ZIP code: 38676
- Area code: 662
- GNIS feature ID: 692158

Prichard is an unincorporated community located near Mississippi Highway 3 in Tunica County, Mississippi, United States. Prichard is approximately 8 miles (13 km) east of North Tunica and approximately 8 miles (13 km) west of Arkabutla.

== Transportation ==
Amtrak’s City of New Orleans, which operates between New Orleans and Chicago, passes through the town on CN tracks, but makes no stop. The nearest station is located in Marks, 34 miles (55 km) to the south.
