= Savage, Mississippi =

- Unincorporated community
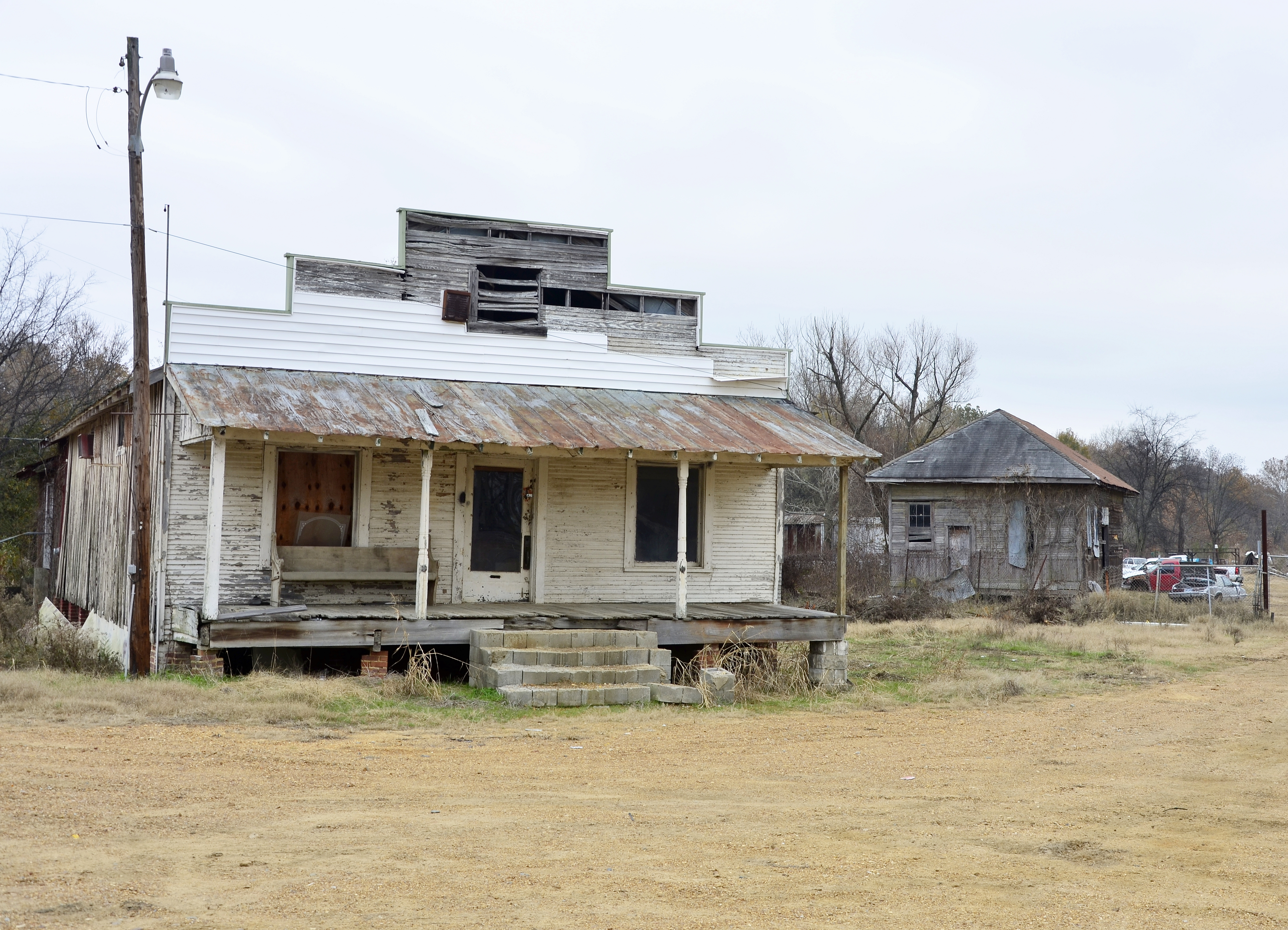
- Abandoned store in Savage

- Location within Mississippi Location within the United States
- Coordinates: 34°37′47″N 90°13′23″W
- Country: United States
- State: Mississippi
- County: Tate
- Elevation: 187 ft (57 m)
- Time zone: UTC-6 (Central (CST))
  - Summer (DST): UTC-5 (CDT)
- ZIP code: 38665
- Area code: 662
- GNIS feature ID: 692212

Savage is an unincorporated community in Tate County, Mississippi, United States. Savage is located approximately 5 miles (8.0 km) north of Sarah and 16 miles (26 km) west of Senatobia along Mississippi highways 3 and 4.

== Transportation ==
Amtrak’s City of New Orleans, which operates between New Orleans and Chicago, passes through the town on CN tracks, but makes no stop. The nearest station is located in Marks, 28 miles (45 km) to the south.
