= Essex, Mississippi =

Unincorporated community in Mississippi, United States

- Unincorporated community
- Location within Mississippi Location within the United States
- Coordinates: 34°19′47″N 90°16′29″W
- Country: United States
- State: Mississippi
- County: Quitman
- Elevation: 164 ft (50 m)
- Time zone: UTC-6 (Central (CST))
  - Summer (DST): UTC-5 (CDT)
- Area code: 662
- GNIS feature ID: 669810

Essex is an unincorporated community in Quitman County, Mississippi. Essex is located on Mississippi Highway 3, north of Marks.

Essex is located on the Canadian National Railway.

A post office operated under the name Essex from 1903 to 1944.
