= Belen, Mississippi =

Unincorporated community in Mississippi, United States

- Unincorporated community
- Location within Mississippi Location within the United States
- Coordinates: 34°16′23″N 90°21′15″W
- Country: United States
- State: Mississippi
- County: Quitman
- Elevation: 167 ft (51 m)
- Time zone: UTC-6 (Central (CST))
  - Summer (DST): UTC-5 (CDT)
- Area code: 662
- GNIS feature ID: 666767

Belen is an unincorporated community in Quitman County, Mississippi. Belen is located on Mississippi Highway 316, west of Marks.

== History ==
Belen is named for the assault that occurred at the Belén Gate during the Battle for Mexico City. John A. Quitman, for whom Quitman County was named for, commanded one of the divisions at this assault. Belen was originally located a few miles east of the current location, but in 1880 it was moved to its current location. The former location became known as Old Belen. A few years later, Leopold Marks founded a mercantile business in Old Belen and changed the community's name to Marks. In 1883, the county seat of Quitman County was moved from Old Belen to Belen. The community was incorporated on March 6, 1888. After the courthouse in Belen burned in 1908, the citizens of Quitman County voted to move the county seat back to Marks in 1910.

Belen is located on Cassidy Bayou, a tributary of the Tallahatchie River. Belen was connected to Greenwood via steamboat service.

In 1900, Belen had a population of 177 and two churches.

The Quitman Quill, a weekly newspaper, was once published in Belen beginning in 1890.

== Notable people ==
- John Brown, former professional football player
- Delma Furniss (1934-2022), American politician, was born in Belen.
