= Yarbrough, Mississippi =

Unincorporated community in Mississippi, United States

- Unincorporated community
- Location within Mississippi Location within the United States
- Coordinates: 34°11′15″N 90°17′25″W
- Country: United States
- State: Mississippi
- County: Quitman
- Elevation: 157 ft (48 m)
- Time zone: UTC-6 (Central (CST))
  - Summer (DST): UTC-5 (CDT)
- Area code: 662
- GNIS feature ID: 683780

Yarbrough is an unincorporated community in Quitman County, Mississippi. Yarbrough is located on Mississippi Highway 3 south of Lambert.

Yarbrough is located on the Canadian National Railway.
