= Askew, Mississippi =

- Unincorporated community
- Location within Mississippi Location within the United States
- Coordinates: 34°32′13″N 90°11′36″W
- Country: United States
- State: Mississippi
- County: Panola
- Elevation: 207 ft (63 m)
- Time zone: UTC-6 (Central (CST))
  - Summer (DST): UTC-5 (CDT)
- ZIP code: 38621
- Area code: 662
- GNIS feature ID: 666404

Askew is an unincorporated community in Panola County, Mississippi. Askew is approximately 3 miles (4.8 km) south of Sarah, along Mississippi Highway 3. Askew is home to the 4,300-acre Askew Wildlife Management Area.

== History ==
The community was originally known as Askews Bluff and was located on the Canadian National Railway. In 1910, Askew was home to three general stores and two sawmills. In 1900, Askew had a population of 20.

A post office operated under the name Askews Bluff from 1890 to 1895 and under the name Askew from 1895 to 1986.

== Transportation ==
Amtrak’s City of New Orleans, which operates between New Orleans and Chicago, passes through the town on CN tracks, but does not make a stop. The nearest station is located in Marks, 21 miles (34 km) to the south.
