= Longstreet =

Longstreet or Long Street may refer to:

== Places ==
- Longstreet, Louisiana, a village in the United States
- Longstreet, Mississippi, an unincorporated community in the United States
- Longstreet, Wiltshire, a settlement in England
- Long Street, Buckinghamshire, a hamlet in England

=== Streets ===
- Long Street (Cape Town), an entertainment district in Cape Town, South Africa
- Long Street (Tetbury), an antique shop street in Gloucestershire, England

== Buildings ==
- Longstreet Rosenwald School, in Louisiana, United States
- Long Street Church, a Presbyterian church in North Carolina, United States
- Long Street Methodist Church, in Greater Manchester, England

== Other uses ==
- Longstreet (surname)
- Longstreet (TV series), a television series about a blind detective
- Longstreet (film), a made-for-television movie
- Operation Longstreet, a 2003 coalition military operation of the Iraq War
