= Falcon, Mississippi =

- Town
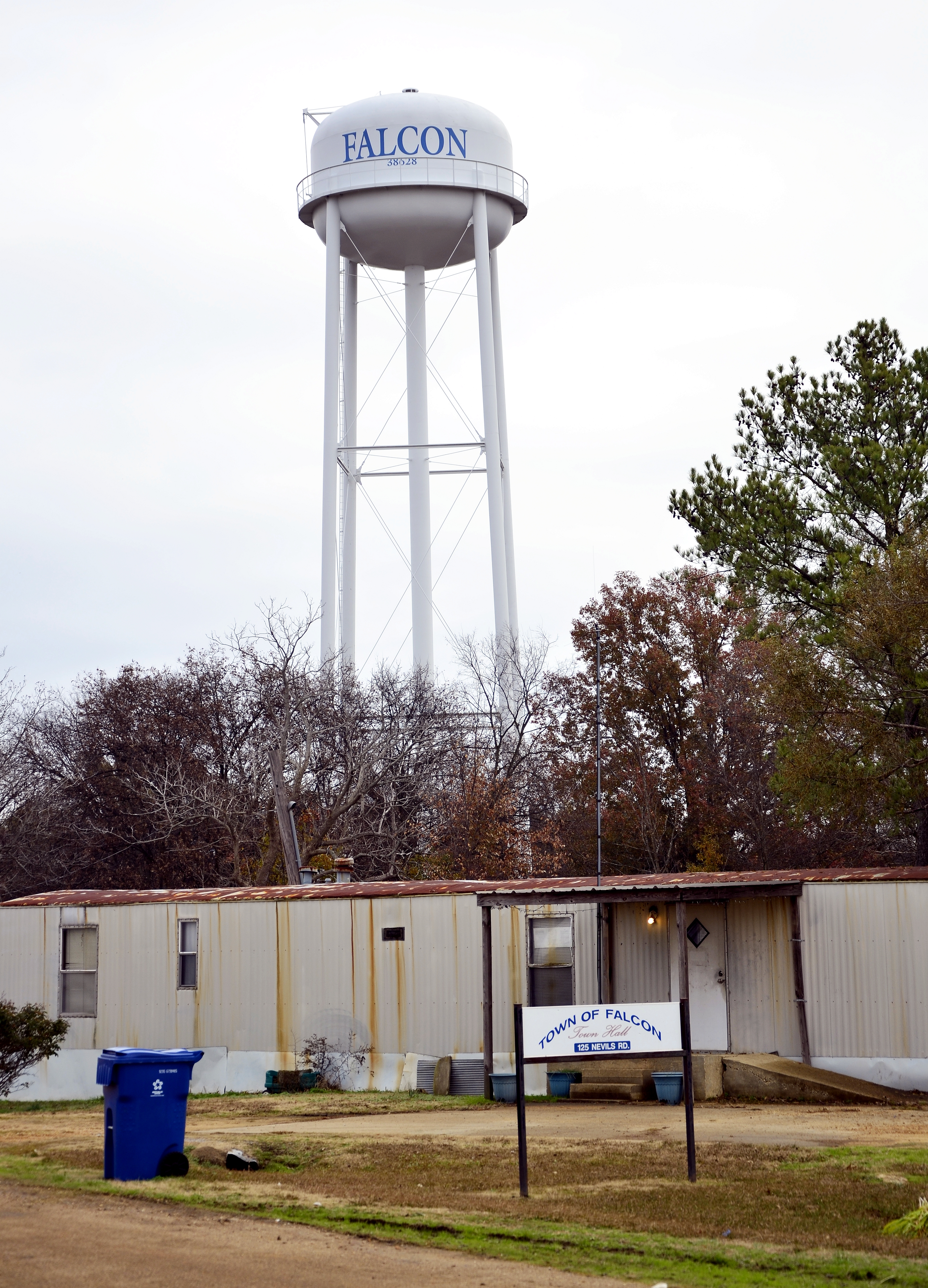
- Falcon's town hall and water tower

- Location of Falcon, Mississippi

- Location in the United States
- Coordinates: 34°23′26″N 90°15′10″W
- Country: United States
- State: Mississippi
- County: Quitman

Area
  - Total: 0.39 sq mi (1.01 km^{2})
  - Land: 0.39 sq mi (1.01 km^{2})
  - Water: 0 sq mi (0.00 km^{2})
- Elevation: 164 ft (50 m)

Population (2020)
  - Total: 116
  - Density: 296.7/sq mi (114.54/km^{2})
- Time zone: UTC-6 (Central (CST))
  - Summer (DST): UTC-5 (CDT)
- ZIP code: 38628
- Area code: 662
- FIPS code: 28-24180
- GNIS feature ID: 2406484

Falcon is a town in Quitman County, Mississippi. The population was 116 at the 2020 census.

== Geography ==
According to the United States Census Bureau, the town has a total area of 0.4 square miles (1.0 km^{2}), all land.

== Demographics ==
Historical population
| Census | Pop. | Note | %± |
|---|---|---|---|
| 1980 | 260 | | — |
| 1990 | 167 | | −35.8% |
| 2000 | 317 | | 89.8% |
| 2010 | 167 | | −47.3% |
| 2020 | 116 | | −30.5% |
U.S. Decennial Census; 2010 2020

=== 2020 census ===
Falcon town, Mississippi – Racial and ethnic composition Note: the US Census treats Hispanic/Latino as an ethnic category. This table excludes Latinos from the racial categories and assigns them to a separate category. Hispanics/Latinos may be of any race.
| Race / Ethnicity (NH = Non-Hispanic) | Pop 2000 | Pop 2010 | Pop 2020 | % 20010 | % 2010 | % 2020 |
|---|---|---|---|---|---|---|
| White alone (NH) | 1 | 8 | 0 | 0.32% | 4.79% | 0.00% |
| Black or African American alone (NH) | 316 | 159 | 115 | 99.68% | 95.21% | 99.14% |
| Native American or Alaska Native alone (NH) | 0 | 0 | 0 | 0.00% | 0.00% | 0.00% |
| Asian alone (NH) | 0 | 0 | 0 | 0.00% | 0.00% | 0.00% |
| Native Hawaiian or Pacific Islander alone (NH) | 0 | 0 | 0 | 0.00% | 0.00% | 0.00% |
| Other race alone (NH) | 0 | 0 | 0 | 0.00% | 0.00% | 0.00% |
| Mixed race or Multiracial (NH) | 0 | 0 | 1 | 0.00% | 0.00% | 0.86% |
| Hispanic or Latino (any race) | 0 | 0 | 0 | 0.00% | 0.00% | 0.00% |
| Total | 317 | 167 | 116 | 100.00% | 100.00% | 100.00% |

=== 2000 Census ===
At the 2000 census there were 317 people, 96 households, and 71 families in the town. The population density was 808.0 inhabitants per square mile (312.0/km^{2}). There were 99 housing units at an average density of 252.3 per square mile (97.4/km^{2}). The racial makeup of the town was 0.32% White and 99.68% African American. Of the 96 households 49.0% had children under the age of 18 living with them, 18.8% were married couples living together, 46.9% had a female householder with no husband present, and 26.0% were non-families. 25.0% of households were one person and 8.3% were one person aged 65 or older. The average household size was 3.30 and the average family size was 3.96.

The age distribution was 42.6% under the age of 18, 13.9% from 18 to 24, 26.8% from 25 to 44, 9.5% from 45 to 64, and 7.3% 65 or older. The median age was 22 years. For every 100 females, there were 70.4 males. For every 100 females age 18 and over, there were 58.3 males.

The median household income was $15,694 and the median family income was $18,333. Males had a median income of $20,250 versus $14,750 for females. The per capita income for the town was $8,053. About 39.5% of families and 39.0% of the population were below the poverty line, including 52.2% of those under age 18 and 25.0% of those age 65 or over.

== Transportation ==
Amtrak’s City of New Orleans, which operates between New Orleans and Chicago, passes through the town on CN tracks, but makes no stop. The nearest station is located in Marks, 10 miles (16 km) to the south.

== Education ==
The Town of Falcon is served by the Quitman County School District.
