= West Marks, Mississippi =

Unincorporated community in Mississippi, United States

- Unincorporated community
- Location within Mississippi Location within the United States
- Coordinates: 34°15′53″N 90°18′19″W
- Country: United States
- State: Mississippi
- County: Quitman
- Elevation: 164 ft (50 m)
- Time zone: UTC-6 (Central (CST))
  - Summer (DST): UTC-5 (CDT)
- Area code: 662
- GNIS feature ID: 679508

West Marks is an unincorporated community in Quitman County, Mississippi, United States. West Marks is located on U.S. Route 278 and Mississippi Highway 6 west of Marks.
