= Hinchcliff, Mississippi =

Unincorporated community in Mississippi, United States

- Unincorporated community
- Location within Mississippi Location within the United States
- Coordinates: 34°18′35″N 90°16′25″W
- Country: United States
- State: Mississippi
- County: Quitman
- Elevation: 164 ft (50 m)
- Time zone: UTC-6 (Central (CST))
  - Summer (DST): UTC-5 (CDT)
- Area code: 662
- GNIS feature ID: 671229

Hinchcliff is an unincorporated community in Quitman County, Mississippi. Hinchcliff is located on Mississippi Highway 3, north of Marks.

Hinchcliff is located on the Canadian National Railway and was once a stop on the Yazoo and Mississippi Valley Railroad.

A post office operated under the name Hinchcliff from 1903 to 1969.

On October 15, 1913, Walter Brownlee was lynched in Hinchcliff after allegedly committing rape. He was later proven innocent.
