= Sabino =

Sabino may refer to:

== Places ==
- Sabino, São Paulo a municipality in the state of São Paulo, Brazil
- Sabino, Mississippi, an unincorporated community in Quitman County, Mississippi
- Sabino Canyon, a canyon in Arizona

== People ==
- João Sabino (1938–1978), Brazilian footballer
- Laura Sabino (born 1999), Brazilian politician and YouTuber
- Rafael Sabino (born 1996), Brazilian footballer
- Sabino (footballer, born 1996), Brazilian football centre-back
- Sabino Barinaga (1922–1988), Spanish footballer
- Sabino (footballer, born 1999), Brazilian football centre-back
- Sabino, a fictional character from the animated film Wish

== Other ==
- Sabino dialect, spoken in Central Italy
- Sabino (steamer), a steam ship at Mystic Seaport
- Sabino horse, a color pattern in horses
- Taxodium mucronatum, a tree sometimes known as sabino
