= Bobo, Quitman County, Mississippi =

Unincorporated community in Mississippi, United States

Bobo, Mississippi
- Unincorporated community
- Location within Mississippi Location within the United States
- Coordinates: 34°17′3″N 90°10′33″W
- Country: United States
- State: Mississippi
- County: Quitman
- Elevation: 144 ft (44 m)
- Time zone: UTC-6 (Central (CST))
  - Summer (DST): UTC-5 (CDT)
- Area code: 662
- GNIS feature ID: 667356

Bobo is an unincorporated community in Quitman County, Mississippi, United States. Bobo is located on U.S. Route 278 and Mississippi Highway 6, northeast of Marks.
