= Locke Station, Mississippi =

Unincorporated community in Mississippi, United States

- Unincorporated community
- Location within Mississippi Location within the United States
- Coordinates: 34°16′43″N 90°09′20″W
- Country: United States
- State: Mississippi
- Counties: Panola and Quitman
- Elevation: 161 ft (49 m)
- Time zone: UTC-6 (Central (CST))
  - Summer (DST): UTC-5 (CDT)
- Area code: 662
- GNIS feature ID: 685692

Locke Station is an unincorporated community in Panola and Quitman counties, Mississippi, United States. Locke Station is located along U.S. Route 278 and Mississippi Highway 6, east of Marks.
