= Riverview, Mississippi =

Unincorporated community in Mississippi, United States

- Unincorporated community
- Location within Mississippi Location within the United States
- Coordinates: 34°17′1″N 90°14′56″W
- Country: United States
- State: Mississippi
- County: Quitman
- Elevation: 161 ft (49 m)
- Time zone: UTC-6 (Central (CST))
  - Summer (DST): UTC-5 (CDT)
- Area code: 662
- GNIS feature ID: 692180

Riverview is an unincorporated community in Quitman County, Mississippi, northeast of Marks.

The community is named for the former Riverview plantation.
