= Barksdale, Mississippi =

Unincorporated community in Mississippi, United States

- Unincorporated community
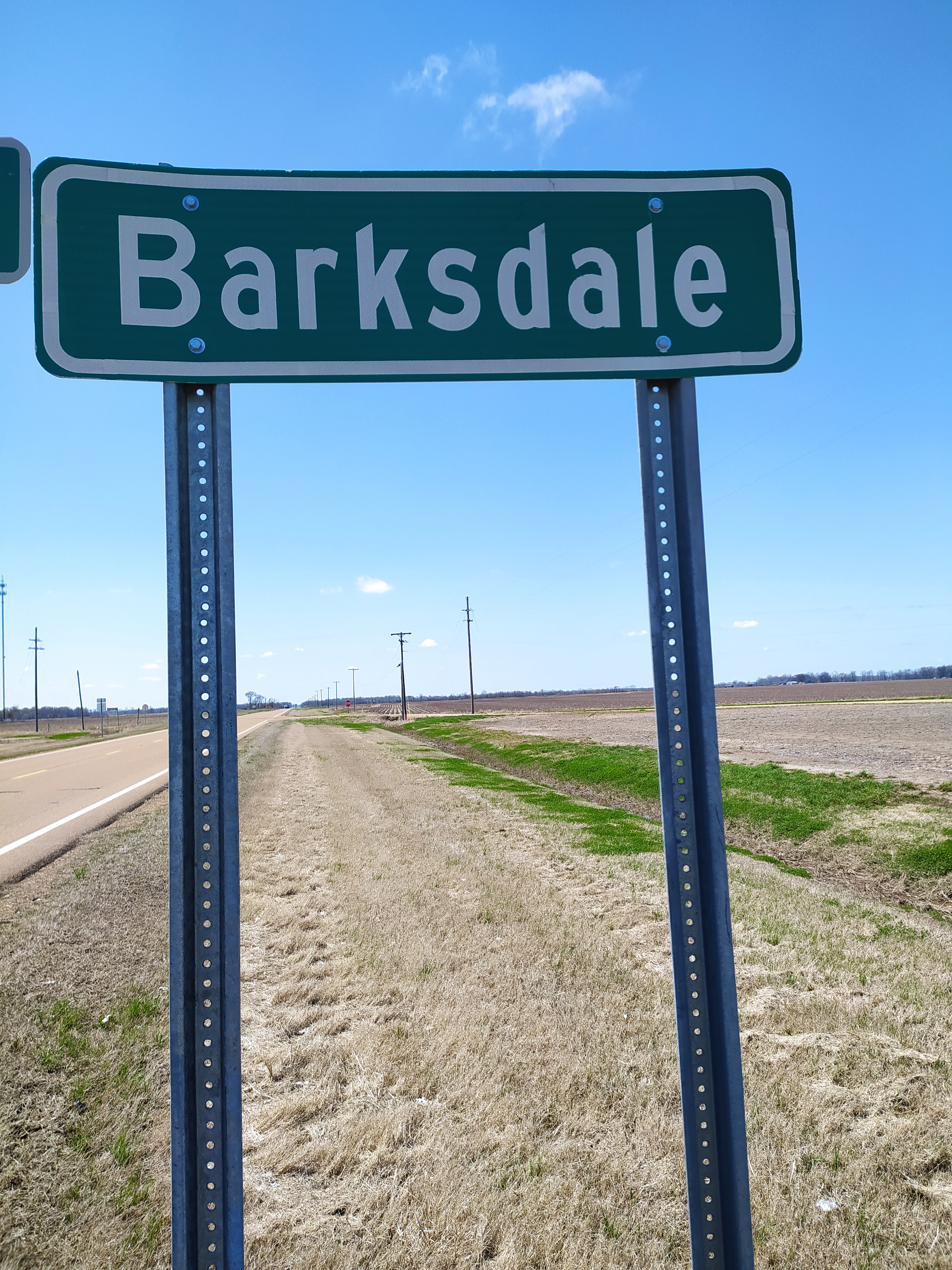
- Barksdale's highway sign located on Mississippi Highway 6

- Location within Mississippi Location within the United States
- Coordinates: 34°13′26″N 90°23′41″W
- Country: United States
- State: Mississippi
- County: Quitman
- Elevation: 171 ft (52 m)
- Time zone: UTC-6 (Central (CST))
  - Summer (DST): UTC-5 (CDT)
- Area code: 662
- GNIS feature ID: 666522

Barksdale is an unincorporated community in Quitman County, Mississippi, located southwest of Marks.
