= Longstreet, Mississippi =

Unincorporated community in Mississippi, United States

- Unincorporated community
- Location within Mississippi Location within the United States
- Coordinates: 34°06′48″N 90°19′47″W
- Country: United States
- State: Mississippi
- County: Quitman
- Elevation: 151 ft (46 m)
- Time zone: UTC-6 (Central (CST))
  - Summer (DST): UTC-5 (CDT)
- Area code: 662
- GNIS feature ID: 692018

Longstreet is an unincorporated community in Quitman County, Mississippi. Longstreet is located on Mississippi Highway 3 southwest of Lambert.

Longstreet is located on the Canadian National Railway.

A post office operated under the name Longstreet from 1905 to 1946.

The Longstreet Site, an archaeological site from the Archaic period, is located near the community.
