= Chancy, Mississippi =

Unincorporated community in Mississippi, United States

- Unincorporated community
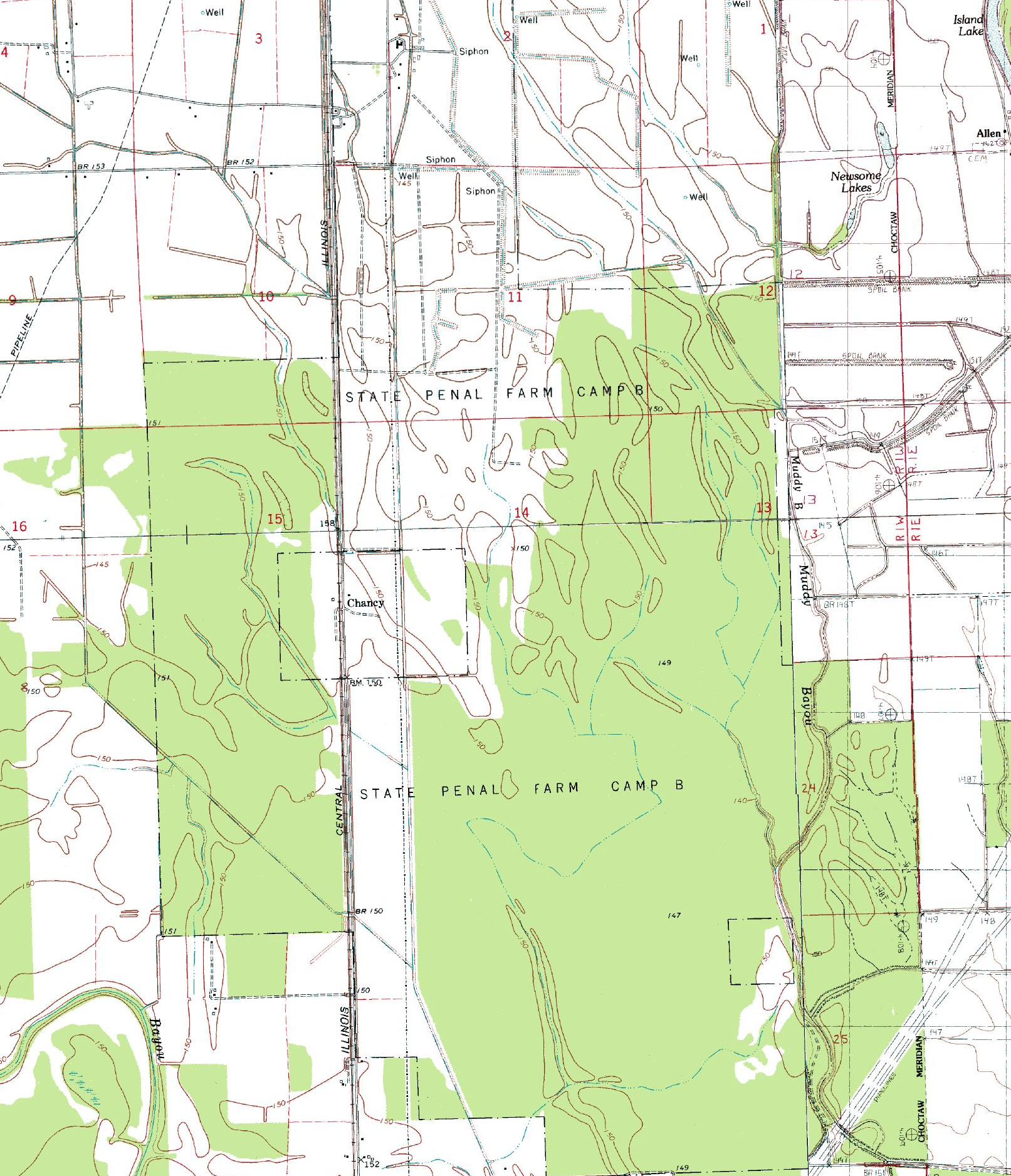
- 1988 USGS map showing Chancy and Camp B

- Location within Mississippi Location within the United States
- Coordinates: 34°07′15″N 90°16′52″W
- Country: United States
- State: Mississippi
- County: Quitman
- Elevation: 154 ft (47 m)
- Time zone: UTC-6 (Central (CST))
  - Summer (DST): UTC-5 (CDT)
- Area code: 662
- GNIS feature ID: 691763

Chancy is an unincorporated community in Quitman County, Mississippi. Chancy is located on Mississippi Highway 321, south of Lambert.

Chancy is located on the Canadian National Railway and once had a train depot.

A post office operated under the name Chancy from 1905 to 1920.

The former Camp B of the Mississippi State Penitentiary was located adjacent to Chancy. Archaeological investigations were performed at Chancy and around Camp B in 2003.
