= Birdie, Mississippi =

Unincorporated community in Mississippi, United States

- Unincorporated community
- Location within Mississippi Location within the United States
- Coordinates: 34°23′31″N 90°22′55″W
- Country: United States
- State: Mississippi
- County: Quitman
- Elevation: 167 ft (51 m)
- Time zone: UTC-6 (Central (CST))
  - Summer (DST): UTC-5 (CDT)
- Area code: 662
- GNIS feature ID: 691706

Birdie is an unincorporated community in Quitman County, Mississippi. Birdie is located on Mississippi Highway 315, northwest of Marks.

Birdie is located on the former Yazoo and Mississippi Valley Railroad.

A post office operated under the name Birdie from 1898 to 1929.

Birdie served as a polling place from 1983 to 1987.
