= John Brown (center) =

American gridiron football player (1922–2009)

- John Brown, 1947 with Dons

No. 29
- Positions: Center, linebacker

Personal information
- Born: April 9, 1922; Belen, Mississippi, U.S.
- Died: June 1, 2009 (aged 87); Baton Rouge, Louisiana, U.S.
- Listed height: 6 ft 4 in (1.93 m)
- Listed weight: 230 lb (104 kg)

Career information
- High school: Theodore Roosevelt (IN)
- College: North Carolina Central

Career history
- Los Angeles Dons (1947–1949); Winnipeg Blue Bombers (1950–1954); British Columbia Lions (1954)

Career statistics
- Games: 76
- Stats at Pro Football Reference

John Edward "The Body" Brown (April 9, 1922 – June 1, 2009) was an American football player who played at the center and linebacker positions. He played college football for North Carolina Central and professional football for the Los Angeles Dons, Winnipeg Blue Bombers, and British Columbia Lions. He was the first African-American player to sign with the Dons and one of the first three players from a historically-black university to play professional football.

== Early life ==
Brown was born in 1922 in Belen, Mississippi. He attended and played football at Theodore Roosevelt High School in Gary, Indiana.

== College football ==
He played college football at North Carolina Central, a historically black university, from 1940 to 1942 and 1947. His college career was interrupted by service in the United States Army during World War II. He played football while in the army and participated in the Spaghetti Bowl in Italy on January 1, 1945.

== Professional football ==
In April 1947, Brown signed with the Los Angeles Dons of the All-America Football Conference.

The Los Angeles Dons had been required by its lease with the Los Angeles Coliseum Commission to provide African-Americans with the opportunity to play. The Dons broke that promise during their first year of operation in 1946. The failure led to criticism in the black press. Brown was the first African-American to sign with the Dons, and his signing was reported with the headline, "Dons Withdraw the Color Line". He was among the first nine African-Americans to play in the AAFC. He was also among the first group of players (along with Ezzrett "Sugarfoot" Anderson, Dons teammate Bert Piggott, and Elmore Harris) from historically-black universities to play professional football. All debuted during the 1947 season.

Brown played at the center and linebacker positions for the Dons from 1947 to 1949, appearing in 40 games.

He also played in the Canadian Football League (CFL) for the Winnipeg Blue Bombers from 1950 to 1954. He received all-WIFU honors in 1950. He was cut by Winnipeg in August 1954.

In September 1954, he was traded by Winnipeg to the British Columbia Lions. He appeared in 36 CFL games.

== Family and later years ==
He died in 2009 at age 87 in Baton Rouge, Louisiana.
