= Oris Mays =

American preacher, gospel singer and songwriter

Reverend Oris Lee Mays (April 7, 1935 – April 21, 1996) was an American preacher, gospel singer and songwriter.

Born in Lambert, Mississippi, he came to Memphis, Tennessee as a teen and graduated from Melrose High School. He studied theology at J. L. Campbell School of Religion and Brewster Seminary.

Mays was pastor of the Boston Baptist Church in Memphis from 1960 to his death.

His recording career unfolded with Don Robey's Song Bird Records, and Jewel Records. Song Bird released an album titled Tribute In Prayer (from A Soldier In Vietnam) in 1966. A compilation appeared in 1973, and another album the next year. In Jewel he had single and album releases from 1965 to 1982. Before the end of the 1970s he released material with Creed/Nashboro Records. A sole 1985 release by Atlanta International Records was followed by one from Miracle Records. Some of the recordings featured his congregation's choir, The Bostonians. In the 1990s he occasionally appeared with Reverend Clay Evans.

Mays also co-owned a Beale Street record shop. He produced gospel records for The Johnson Ensemble and The Masonic Travelers under Jewel Records, Ollie Collins Jr under Song Bird, and a secular one for The Seven Brothers. From November 1968 he was A&R person and regional promotion manager for Holiday Inn Records/Klondike. He also worked for the more obscure Memphis label, B. B. Productions. His gospel TV program on Sundays, broadcast from about 1966 on WMC-TV, was the first such program hosted by an African-American in Memphis. In its last years it was broadcast by WHBQ-TV. Mays' church sermons were aired on the WLOK and WBBP local radio stations.

Mays' 1966 album, and a 1970 song, show conflicting attitudes about the Vietnam War. His song "Don't Let the Devil Ride" was covered by numerous artists, including Brother Joe May, Bishop Dready Manning, The Campbell Brothers and Lucinda Williams.

Mays died in April 1996, at the age of 61.
