= Coldwater River National Wildlife Refuge =

United States National Wildlife Refuge in Mississippi

Coldwater National Wildlife Refuge
- IUCN category IV (habitat/species management area)
- Location within the United States
- Location: Northwest Mississippi
- Nearest city: Crowder
- Coordinates: 34.0876°N 90.143°W
- Area: 2,069 acres (837 ha)
- Established: 2000
- Governing body: U.S. Fish and Wildlife Service
- Website: Coldwater River National Wildlife Refuge

The Coldwater National Wildlife Refuge is located in northwest Mississippi, 4.5 miles (7.2 km) south of the town of Crowder. Established in 2000, this small refuge consists of 2,069 acres (837 ha) within an acquisition boundary of 16,000 acres (6,500 ha). The centerpiece of the refuge is 25 old catfish ponds ranging in size from 9 to 21 acres (3.6 to 8.5 ha) and totaling 495 acres (200 ha). These ponds are intensively managed for migrating waterfowl, shorebirds and wading birds. A majority of the refuge has been reforested in native bottomland hardwood species. Almost the entire refuge is flooded annually during the winter/spring by the Coldwater and Tallahatchie Rivers. Up to 50,000 migratory waterfowl winter on the refuge and 34 species of shorebirds have been recorded during spring and fall migration. Peregrine falcon, least tern, black tern, bald and golden eagles, and wood stork have been observed. Due to intensive management, the refuge is critically important as a sanctuary for waterfowl and other neotropical migratory birds. Primarily for these reasons, the refuge is closed to public access
