= Quitman County, Mississippi =

County in Mississippi, United States

- County
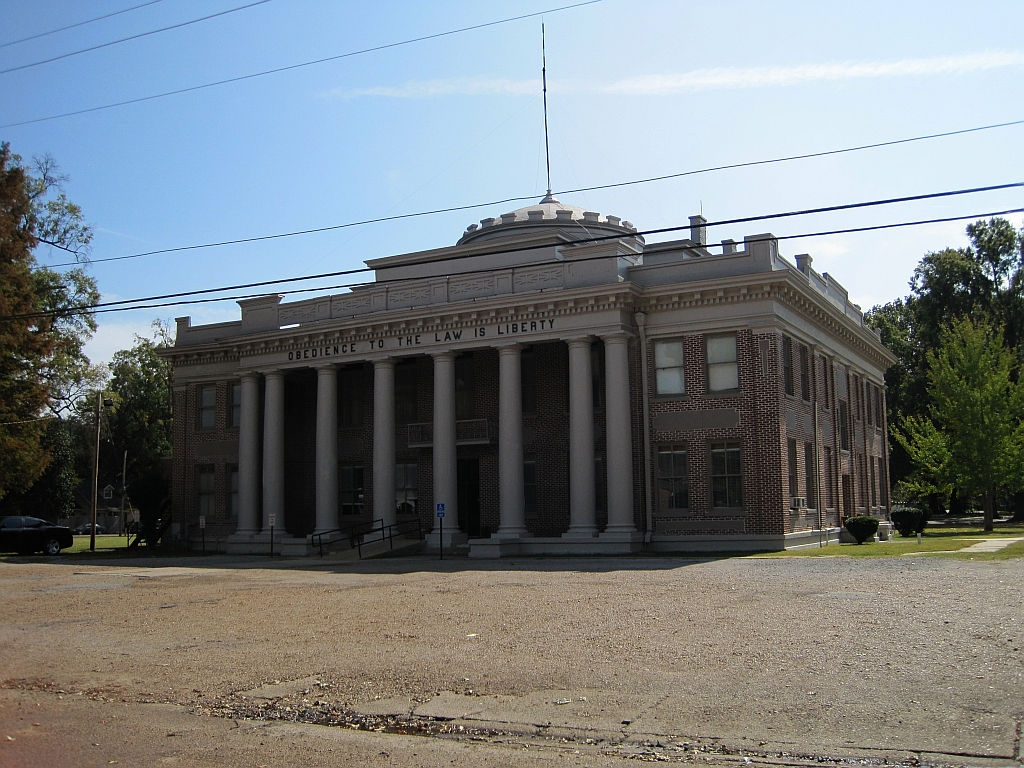
- Quitman County Courthouse

- Location within the U.S. state of Mississippi
- Coordinates: 34°15′N 90°17′W
- Country: United States
- State: Mississippi
- Founded: 1877
- Named for: John A. Quitman
- Seat: Marks
- Largest town: Marks

Area
  - Total: 406 sq mi (1,050 km^{2})
  - Land: 405 sq mi (1,050 km^{2})
  - Water: 1.4 sq mi (3.6 km^{2}) 0.3%

Population (2020)
  - Total: 6,176
  - Estimate (2025): 5,364 ▼
  - Density: 15.2/sq mi (5.89/km^{2})
- Time zone: UTC−6 (Central)
  - Summer (DST): UTC−5 (CDT)
- Congressional district: 2nd
- Website: quitmancountyms.org

Quitman County is a county located in the U.S. state of Mississippi. As of the 2020 census, the population was 6,176, making it the third-least populous county in Mississippi. Its county seat is Marks. The county is named after John A. Quitman, Governor of Mississippi from 1835 to 1836 and from 1850 to 1851.

Quitman County is located in the Mississippi Delta region of Mississippi.

== History ==
Quitman County was formed in 1877 from portions of Tunica, Coahoma, Panola, and Tallahatchie Counties. The bill for its creation was introduced into the Mississippi Legislature by Leopold Marks while he was serving as a representative from Tunica County. The county was developed for cotton cultivation. Much of the bottomlands behind the riverfront were not developed until the late 19th century, and population continued to increase as the frontier was cleared and cultivated. The county reached its peak population in 1940. Agricultural mechanization reduced the need for farm labor, and workers were recruited to northern and midwestern industrial cities. Thousands of African Americans left in the Great Migration, many going upriver to St. Louis and Chicago.

=== Poor People's Campaign ===
Martin Luther King Jr. originally wanted the Poor People's Campaign to start in Quitman County because of the intense and visible economic disparity there. On March 18, 1968, King visited the town of Marks, Mississippi. He watched a teacher feeding black schoolchildren their lunch, consisting only of a slice of apple and some crackers, and was moved to tears.

After King's death, the Southern part of the Campaign began in Quitman County. Participants rode a train of mules to Washington, D.C. to protest about economic conditions. According to wagonmaster Willie Bolden, white citizens of Marks harassed the mule train on its way out of town. Bolden stated that they "would drive by blowing their horns, purposely trying to spook the mules and us." More recently, Quitman County residents have made an effort to promote tourism based on the county's role in the Poor People's Campaign.

== Geography ==
According to the U.S. Census Bureau, the county has a total area of 406 square miles (1,050 km^{2}), of which 405 square miles (1,050 km^{2}) is land and 1.4 square miles (3.6 km^{2}) (0.3%) is water. It is the fourth-smallest county in Mississippi by land area and third-smallest by total area.

=== Major highways ===
- Mississippi Highway 3
- Mississippi Highway 6
- U.S. Route 278
- Mississippi Highway 315

=== Adjacent counties ===
- Tunica County (north)
- Panola County (east)
- Tallahatchie County (south)
- Coahoma County (west)

=== National protected area ===
- Coldwater River National Wildlife Refuge (part)

== Demographics ==
Reflecting the decreased need for farm labor after mechanization and the development of industrial farms, the population has declined by more than two thirds since its peak in 1940.

Historical population
Census	Pop.	Note	%±
1880	1,407		—
1890	3,286		133.5%
1900	5,435		65.4%
1910	11,593		113.3%
1920	19,861		71.3%
1930	25,304		27.4%
1940	27,191		7.5%
1950	25,885		−4.8%
1960	21,019		−18.8%
1970	15,888		−24.4%
1980	12,636		−20.5%
1990	10,490		−17.0%
2000	10,117		−3.6%
2010	8,223		−18.7%
2020	6,176		−24.9%
2025 (est.)	5,364	▼	−13.1%
U.S. Decennial Census; 1790-1960 1900-1990; 1990-2000 2010-2013

=== Racial and ethnic composition ===
Quitman County, Mississippi – Racial and ethnic composition Note: the US Census treats Hispanic/Latino as an ethnic category. This table excludes Latinos from the racial categories and assigns them to a separate category. Hispanics/Latinos may be of any race.
Race / Ethnicity (NH = Non-Hispanic)	Pop 1980	Pop 1990	Pop 2000	Pop 2010	Pop 2020	% 1980	% 1990	% 2000	% 2010	% 2020
White alone (NH)	5,504	4,219	3,065	2,369	1,484	43.56%	40.22%	30.30%	28.81%	24.03%
Black or African American alone (NH)	7,008	6,189	6,919	5,709	4,546	55.46%	59.00%	68.39%	69.43%	73.61%
Native American or Alaska Native alone (NH)	3	16	13	18	1	0.02%	0.15%	0.13%	0.22%	0.02%
Asian alone (NH)	24	18	17	11	12	0.19%	0.17%	0.17%	0.13%	0.19%
Native Hawaiian or Pacific Islander alone (NH)	x	x	1	1	3	x	x	0.01%	0.01%	0.05%
Other race alone (NH)	0	0	1	1	4	0.00%	0.00%	0.01%	0.01%	0.06%
Mixed race or Multiracial (NH)	x	x	46	59	105	x	x	0.45%	0.72%	1.70%
Hispanic or Latino (any race)	97	48	55	55	21	0.77%	0.46%	0.54%	0.67%	0.34%
Total	12,636	10,490	10,117	8,223	6,176	100.00%	100.00%	100.00%	100.00%	100.00%

=== 2020 census ===
As of the 2020 census, the county had a population of 6,176. The median age was 44.0 years. 20.9% of residents were under the age of 18 and 19.7% of residents were 65 years of age or older. For every 100 females there were 90.6 males, and for every 100 females age 18 and over there were 85.6 males age 18 and over.

The racial makeup of the county was 24.1% White, 73.6% Black or African American, <0.1% American Indian and Alaska Native, 0.2% Asian, <0.1% Native Hawaiian and Pacific Islander, 0.1% from some other race, and 1.9% from two or more races. Hispanic or Latino residents of any race comprised 0.3% of the population.

<0.1% of residents lived in urban areas, while 100.0% lived in rural areas.

There were 2,577 households in the county, of which 27.1% had children under the age of 18 living in them. Of all households, 30.4% were married-couple households, 22.5% were households with a male householder and no spouse or partner present, and 42.1% were households with a female householder and no spouse or partner present. About 35.8% of all households were made up of individuals and 15.6% had someone living alone who was 65 years of age or older.

There were 3,030 housing units, of which 15.0% were vacant. Among occupied housing units, 63.6% were owner-occupied and 36.4% were renter-occupied. The homeowner vacancy rate was 1.0% and the rental vacancy rate was 12.1%.

=== 2010 census ===
As of the 2010 United States census, there were 8,223 people living in the county. 69.6% were Black or African American, 29.0% White, 0.2% Native American, 0.1% Asian, 0.3% of some other race and 0.8% of two or more races. 0.7% were Hispanic or Latino (of any race).

=== 2000 census ===
As of the census of 2000, there were 10,117 people, 3,565 households, and 2,506 families living in the county. The population density was 25 people per square mile (9.7 people/km^{2}). There were 3,923 housing units at an average density of 10 units per square mile (3.9 units/km^{2}). The racial makeup of the county was 68.62% Black or African American, 30.47% White, 0.13% Native American, 0.17% Asian, 0.01% Pacific Islander, 0.08% from other races, and 0.52% from two or more races. 0.54% of the population were Hispanic or Latino of any race.

In 2000, there were 3,565 households, out of which 34.40% had children under the age of 18 living with them, 37.60% were married couples living together, 26.80% had a female householder with no husband present, and 29.70% were non-families. 26.90% of all households were made up of individuals, and 12.30% had someone living alone who was 65 years of age or older. The average household size was 2.80 and the average family size was 3.42.

In the county, the population was spread out, with 32.00% under the age of 18, 9.60% from 18 to 24, 25.70% from 25 to 44, 19.50% from 45 to 64, and 13.20% who were 65 years of age or older. The median age was 32 years. For every 100 females there were 86.50 males. For every 100 females age 18 and over, there were 79.30 males.

The median income for a household in the county was $20,636, and the median income for a family was $25,394. Males had a median income of $23,571 versus $16,993 for females. The per capita income for the county was $10,817. About 28.60% of families and 33.10% of the population were below the poverty line, including 43.10% of those under age 18 and 30.60% of those age 65 or over.

Quitman County has the fifth-lowest per capita income in Mississippi and the 51st lowest in the United States.

== Government and infrastructure ==
The Mississippi Department of Corrections (MDOC) operates the Quitman County Community Work Center (CWC) in an area near Lambert. In addition MDOC operates the Mississippi State Penitentiary (Parchman) in an unincorporated area in Sunflower County, in the area. Camp B, an inmate housing unit, was a satellite complex located away from the main Parchman prison property in unincorporated Quitman County, near Lambert. Camp B was one of Parchman's largest African-American housing units. Camp B's buildings have been demolished. The Mississippi Code (§ 47-5-131) gives Quitman County the right to "not over twenty (20) offenders from the Parchman facility for five (5) workdays of each week for the purpose of working the roads of Quitman County", and goes on to state that the "board of supervisors of Quitman County shall lay out and designate roads to be worked by the offenders, and the board of supervisors shall furnish transportation to and from the Parchman facility for offenders."

Quitman County has a high African American population and is also heavily Democratic. It has not supported a Republican presidential candidate since 1972, although Ronald Reagan came within 4 points of winning the county in 1984.

United States presidential election results for Quitman County, Mississippi
Year	Republican		Democratic		Third party(ies)	
Year	No.	%	No.	%	No.	%
1912	4	1.83%	195	89.04%	20	9.13%
1916	12	4.21%	272	95.44%	1	0.35%
1920	39	9.35%	377	90.41%	1	0.24%
1924	36	5.90%	574	94.10%	0	0.00%
1928	86	9.78%	793	90.22%	0	0.00%
1932	18	2.43%	720	97.04%	4	0.54%
1936	9	0.87%	1,025	99.03%	1	0.10%
1940	29	2.45%	1,152	97.46%	1	0.08%
1944	59	5.06%	1,106	94.94%	0	0.00%
1948	21	1.81%	91	7.84%	1,048	90.34%
1952	492	29.82%	1,158	70.18%	0	0.00%
1956	276	18.41%	954	63.64%	269	17.95%
1960	299	19.22%	583	37.47%	674	43.32%
1964	2,065	86.01%	336	13.99%	0	0.00%
1968	434	9.91%	1,502	34.30%	2,443	55.79%
1972	2,524	74.41%	790	23.29%	78	2.30%
1976	1,287	31.82%	2,621	64.80%	137	3.39%
1980	1,691	35.16%	2,926	60.83%	193	4.01%
1984	2,198	48.33%	2,343	51.52%	7	0.15%
1988	1,832	42.11%	2,497	57.39%	22	0.51%
1992	1,451	35.45%	2,422	59.17%	220	5.38%
1996	1,121	32.54%	2,186	63.45%	138	4.01%
2000	1,280	37.50%	2,103	61.62%	30	0.88%
2004	1,360	39.81%	2,032	59.48%	24	0.70%
2008	1,334	32.01%	2,803	67.25%	31	0.74%
2012	1,116	28.05%	2,837	71.30%	26	0.65%
2016	1,001	29.75%	2,312	68.71%	52	1.55%
2020	1,026	31.80%	2,150	66.65%	50	1.55%
2024	902	33.69%	1,725	64.44%	50	1.87%

== Education ==
On July 24, 1969, federal judge William Keady found that Quitman County school officials were maintaining an unconstitutional de jure racially segregated school system, and he placed the school board under the supervision of United States District Court for the Northern District of Mississippi. As of 1993, this order had not been set aside. In March 1991, the school board asked the district court for permission to close Crowder elementary and junior high school, a majority-white school. The court gave permission, and a group of parents sued for an injunction to prevent the closing. The district court denied them an injunction, and this decision was affirmed by the United States Court of Appeals for the Fifth Circuit.

By 1975, the majority of African-American students in Quitman County were attending public schools, which had earlier been segregated. But the majority of white students had been moved into newly established private academies. This situation has continued; in 2007 the Mississippi Department of Education found that the students in the district were 97.92% African American, 1.81% White, and 0.27% Hispanic.

Schools in Quitman County remain effectively segregated by race. White students almost exclusively attend private schools while Black children attend the local public schools.

School	Total Students	White Students	Black Students	Note
Delta Academy (Private)	175	147 (84.0%)	17 (9.7%)	
M. S. Palmer High School (Public)	351	4 (1.1%)	347 (98.9%)	
Combined (Public plus private)	526	151 (28.7%)	364 (69.2%)	

- Public School Districts
  - Quitman County School District - The only school district in the county.
- Private Schools
  - Delta Academy (Marks)

== Communities ==
=== City ===
- Marks (county seat)

=== Towns ===
- Crenshaw (mostly in Panola County)
- Crowder (partly in Panola County)
- Falcon
- Lambert
- Sledge

=== Census-designated place ===
- Darling

=== Other unincorporated communities ===
- Allen
- Barksdale
- Belen
- Birdie
- Bobo
- Chancy
- Denton
- Essex
- Hinchcliff
- Locke Station (partly in Panola County)
- Longstreet
- Oliverfried
- Riverview
- Sabino
- Vance (partly in Tallahatchie County)
- Walnut
- West Marks
- Yarbrough

== Notable people ==
- Earl Hooker (January 15, 1929 – April 21, 1970) – blues guitarist.
- Charley Pride (March 18, 1934 – December 12, 2020) – country music artist.
- Snooky Pryor (September 15, 1921 – October 18, 2006) – harmonica player.
- Sunnyland Slim (September 5, 1907 – March 17, 1995 ) – blues piano player.
- Fred Smith (born August 11, 1944) – founder, President and CEO FedEx

== See also ==
- National Register of Historic Places listings in Quitman County, Mississippi
