= Mississippi Highway 3 =

State Highway in Mississippi

Mississippi Highway 3
- MS 3 highlighted in red

Route information
- Maintained by MDOT
- Length: 191.8 mi (308.7 km) (119.401 mi excluding concurrencies)
- Existed: 1932–present

Major junctions
- South end: US 61 in Redwood
- US 49W from Yazoo City to Inverness; US 82 in Moorhead; US 49W from Sunflower to Tutwiler; US 278 in Marks
- North end: US 61 in Lake Cormorant

Location
- Country: United States
- State: Mississippi
- Counties: Warren, Yazoo, Humphreys, Sunflower, Tallahatchie, Quitman, Panola, Tate, Tunica, DeSoto

Highway system
- Mississippi State Highway System; Interstate; US; State
← MS 2	→ MS 4

Mississippi Highway 3 (MS 3) is a north–south Mississippi state highway, located entirely within the Mississippi Delta region, running from Redwood to Lake Cormorant, both at an intersection with U.S. Route 61 (US 61). For much of its duration, MS 3 is overlapped (concurrent) with U.S. Route 49W (US 49W). It travels approximately 192 miles (309 km), serving DeSoto, Tunica, Tate, Panola, Quitman, Tallahatchie, Sunflower, Humphreys, Yazoo, and Warren counties.

== Route description ==
MS 3 begins in northern Warren County in the Redwood community at an interchange with US 61 along the banks of the Yazoo River. It heads northeast, paralleling the river, as a two-lane highway for several miles along the western edge of a hilly plateau, which marks the eastern boundary of the Mississippi Delta, to cross into Yazoo County.

MS 3 continues northeast to pass through Satartia, where it meets MS 433, before passing through more rural areas (passing just west of Tinsley) to enter the Yazoo City city limits. The highway bypasses downtown along its west side, where it has an interchange with MS 16/MS 149. MS 3 now comes to an interchange with US 49W, which it becomes concurrent with and follows northward as a four-lane divided highway to pass through farmland for several miles, crossing over the Yazoo River, before entering Humphreys County just southwest of Carter.

US 49W/MS 3 now cross over the Will M. Whittington Auxiliary Channel and Lake Atchaflya before passing through Silver City and having an intersection with MS 149. The highway continues north, paralleling the Yazoo River, to pass through Belzoni, where it bypasses downtown along its west side and has a short concurrency with MS 12 and an intersection with MS 7. US 49W/MS 3 continue northwest to pass through Isola, where it has an intersection with unsigned MS 806 (Belzoni Street) and crosses over Lake Dawson, before entering Sunflower County.

The highway passes through Caile and Inverness, where it intersects another section of MS 149, before MS 3 splits off near Baird. MS 3 heads northeast as a two-lane highway to pass just south of Baird before curving directly north to pass directly through downtown Moorhead, where it has an intersection with US 82 at the northern edge of town. The highway continues north through farmland for several miles to cross the Quiver River before rejoining US 49W on the south side of the town of Sunflower (with US 49W being a two-lane highway this time). The highway bypasses Sunflower along it southern and eastern sides before passing through Dwyer and Blaine. US 49W/MS 3 passes through Doddsville, where it has a short concurrency with MS 442 and intersects unsigned MS 832, and Cottondale before passing through Ruleville, where it has an intersection with unsigned MS 812 and MS 8. The highway passes through Drew, where it intersects unsigned MS 820, before passing by the Mississippi State Penitentiary, where it has an intersection with MS 32. US 49W/MS 3 pass through Rome before entering Tallahatchie County.

The highway passes northeast through rural areas for several miles before entering Tutwiler and US 49W comes to an end at a Y-Intersection/interchange between US 49 and US 49E, with MS 3 continuing north along US 49. MS 3 follows US 49 north for not even a half mile before splitting off and heading northeast to cross into Quitman County at the community of Vance.

MS 3, now also known as Charley Pride Highway, heads through farmland to cross some small Bayous as it passes through the community of Denton, where it becomes concurrent with MS 322, and the town of Lambert, where MS 322 splits off. The highway now passes through the town of Marks, where it has an intersection with US 278/MS 6, before crossing the Coldwater River (which it also begins paralleling) and passing through the community of Hinchcliff and the towns of Darling, Falcon, and Sledge (with Sledge being where MS 3 has intersections with both MS 714 and MS 315). MS 3 now enters Panola County.

MS 3 passes through the town of Crenshwaw, where it has an intersection with MS 310, before passing through wooded areas for several miles as it travels through the Askew community before entering Tate County.

The highway passes through the community of Sarah before reentering farmland at intersection with MS 4, which it becomes concurrent with. MS 3/MS 4 now turn northwest to pass through the community of Savage and cross the Coldwater River for a second time to enter Tunica County. The highway immediately comes to a large interchange, where MS 3 splits of and heads due north.

MS 3 heads through farmland for several miles to pass through the communities of Prichard and Banks, where it has an intersection with MS 713, before entering Desoto County.

The highway now has a partial interchange with MS 304 before coming to an end shortly thereafter at an intersection with US 61 along the south side of the community of Lake Cormorant.

== Major intersections ==
County	Location	mi	km	Destinations	Notes
Warren	Redwood	0.0	0.0	US 61 – Vicksburg, Rolling Fork	Interchange; southern terminus
Yazoo	Satartia	21.1	34.0	MS 433 – Satartia, Newtown	
Yazoo	Yazoo City	35.7– 35.9	57.5– 57.8	MS 16 / MS 149 – Louise, Yazoo City	Interchange
Yazoo	Yazoo City	38.7	62.3	US 49W south to US 49 south / US 49E north – Greenwood, Jackson	Interchange; south end of US 49W overlap
Overlap with US 49W
Sunflower	Inverness	77.4	124.6	US 49W north – Indianola	North end of US 49W overlap
Sunflower	Moorhead	85.6	137.8	US 82 – Indianola, Greenwood	
Sunflower	Sunflower	91.0	146.5	US 49W south – Yazoo City	South end of US 49W overlap
Overlap with US 49W
Tallahatchie	Tutwiler	125.8– 126.1	202.5– 202.9	US 49W ends / US 49 begins / US 49E south – Greenwood	North end of US 49W overlap; south end of US 49 overlap; US 49W north and US 49E merge into US 49
Tallahatchie	Tutwiler	126.5	203.6	US 49 north – Clarksdale, Memphis	North end of US 49 overlap
Quitman		139.1	223.9	MS 322 west	South end of MS 322 overlap
Quitman	Lambert	142.3	229.0	MS 322 east – Crowder, O'Keefe WMA	North end of MS 322 overlap
Quitman	Marks	146.3	235.4	US 278 / MS 6 – Clarksdale, Batesville	
Quitman	Sledge	159.1	256.0	MS 714 west – Sledge	Eastern terminus of MS 714
Quitman	Sledge	159.8	257.2	MS 315 – Sardis	
Panola	Crenshaw	164.6	264.9	MS 310 east – Como	Western terminus of MS 310
Tate		172.0	276.8	MS 4 east – Senatobia	South end of MS 4 overlap
Tunica	Savage	174.5– 174.8	280.8– 281.3	MS 4 west – Tunica	North end of MS 4 overlap
Tunica	Banks	188.1	302.7	MS 713 to I-69 north – Robinsonville, Hernando	
DeSoto		191.0– 191.2	307.4– 307.7	MS 304 east to I-69 north	Interchange
DeSoto	Lake Cormorant	191.8	308.7	US 61 – Walls, Memphis	Northern terminus
1.000 mi = 1.609 km; 1.000 km = 0.621 mi: Concurrency terminus
