= Denton, Mississippi =

Unincorporated community in Mississippi, United States

- Unincorporated community
- Location within Mississippi Location within the United States
- Coordinates: 34°08′46″N 90°18′45″W
- Country: United States
- State: Mississippi
- County: Quitman
- Elevation: 154 ft (47 m)
- Time zone: UTC-6 (Central (CST))
  - Summer (DST): UTC-5 (CDT)
- Area code: 662
- GNIS feature ID: 691811

Denton is an unincorporated community in Quitman County, Mississippi. Denton is located on Mississippi Highway 3, south of Lambert.

Denton is located on the Canadian National Railway.

A post office operated under the name Denton from 1910 to 1922.

The Denton Site, an important archaeological site from the Archaic period in Mississippi, is located near the community. The Denton type projectile point is named for the Denton site.
