= Delma Furniss =

American railroad conductor and politician (1934–2022)

Member of the Mississippi Senate from the 11th district
- In office January 5, 1993 – January 6, 2004
- Preceded by: Kenneth Williams
- Succeeded by: Robert L. Jackson

Member of the Mississippi House of Representatives from the 27th district
- In office January 3, 1984 – January 5, 1993
- Preceded by: Kenneth Williams
- Succeeded by: Ferr Smith

Personal details
- Born: July 30, 1934 Belen, Mississippi, U.S.
- Died: January 31, 2022 (aged 87)
- Party: Democratic
- Education: Delta State University (BA); University of Mississippi (MS)

Vernon Delma Furniss (July 30, 1934 – January 31, 2022) was an American Democratic politician and railroad conductor. He was a member of the Mississippi State Senate from 1993 to 2004, and a member of the Mississippi House of Representatives from 1984 to 1993.

== Biography ==
Vernon Delma Furniss was born on July 30, 1934, in Belen, Mississippi. He received a B. A. degree from Delta State University and a M. S. degree from the University of Mississippi. Furniss was a conductor for the Illinois Central Railroad. He was a member of the Mississippi House of Representatives from 1984 to 1993. He then was a member of the Mississippi State Senate from 1993 until his retirement in 2004. Furniss was a Democrat. Furniss died on January 31, 2022.
