= Sabino, Mississippi =

Unincorporated community in Mississippi, United States

- Unincorporated community
- Location within Mississippi Location within the United States
- Coordinates: 34°12′15″N 90°24′26″W
- Country: United States
- State: Mississippi
- County: Quitman
- Elevation: 161 ft (49 m)
- Time zone: UTC-6 (Central (CST))
  - Summer (DST): UTC-5 (CDT)
- Area code: 662
- GNIS feature ID: 676986

Sabino is an unincorporated community in Quitman County, Mississippi. Sabino is east of Clarksdale and west of Lambert.

A post office operated under the name Sabino from 1900 to 1918.

Sabino formerly served as a polling place.
