= Longstreet (surname) =

Longstreet is an English surname. Notable people with the surname include:

- Augustus Baldwin Longstreet (1790–1870), American humorist, lawyer, college president, Southerner, writer
- Charles Longstreet Weltner (1927–1992), American jurist and politician
- Edward Longstreet Bodin (1894–1983), American writer
- Hattie Longstreet Price (1891–1968), American artist and illustrator
- Helen Dortch Longstreet (1863–1962), American author and feminist, second wife of James Longstreet
- Husan Longstreet, American football player
- James Longstreet (1821–1904), Confederate general
- Martha Longstreet (1870–1953), American physician
- Richard Longstreet Tea (1840–1911) American soldier
- Stephen Longstreet (1907–2002), American author
- Victor M. Longstreet (1906–2000), American economist and Assistant Secretary of the Navy
- William Longstreet (c. 1760–1814), American inventor
