= Leopold Marks =

American politician (1851–1910)

Member of the Mississippi House of Representatives from the Quitman County district
- In office January 1884 – January 1888

Personal details
- Born: February 7, 1851 Labau, Prussia
- Died: 1910 (aged 58–59)
- Party: Democratic
- Children: 7

Leopold Marks (February 7, 1851 – 1910) was a Prussian-born Jewish-American Democratic politician, farmer, and merchant. Marks was a member of the Mississippi House of Representatives in the 1884 and 1886 sessions. The city of Marks, Mississippi, is named after him.

== Early life ==
Leopold Marks was born on February 7, 1851, in the city of Labau, West Prussia, Prussia. He was the son of I. Marks, who was a merchant and planter. Marks was Jewish. Leopold attended the grammar and high schools in his home country. At the age of 17, Marks fled Prussia to escape compulsory army service and landed in New York City in the United States. When he arrived in the US, Marks owned only 18 cents and did not know the English language. In New York, Marks worked until he had a pack of jewelry, which he peddled all the way to Friar Point, Mississippi. Then, Marks bought forest and riverbank land in the present location of Marks, Mississippi. He then opened a store there, which became very large.

== Political career ==
Marks helped create Quitman County, Mississippi, in 1877. He served as its first representative to the Mississippi House of Representatives, from 1884 to 1888.

== Later life ==
Marks died in 1910.

== Personal life ==
Marks married his first wife, Pauline, in 1875. They had 5 sons, whose names were Sam M., Henry H., Marcus L., Maurice I., and Robert F. Pauline died in 1900 and Marks was re-married to Sadie Whitehead. They had two children, named Edwin and Lucille.
