= Crowder, Mississippi =

- Town
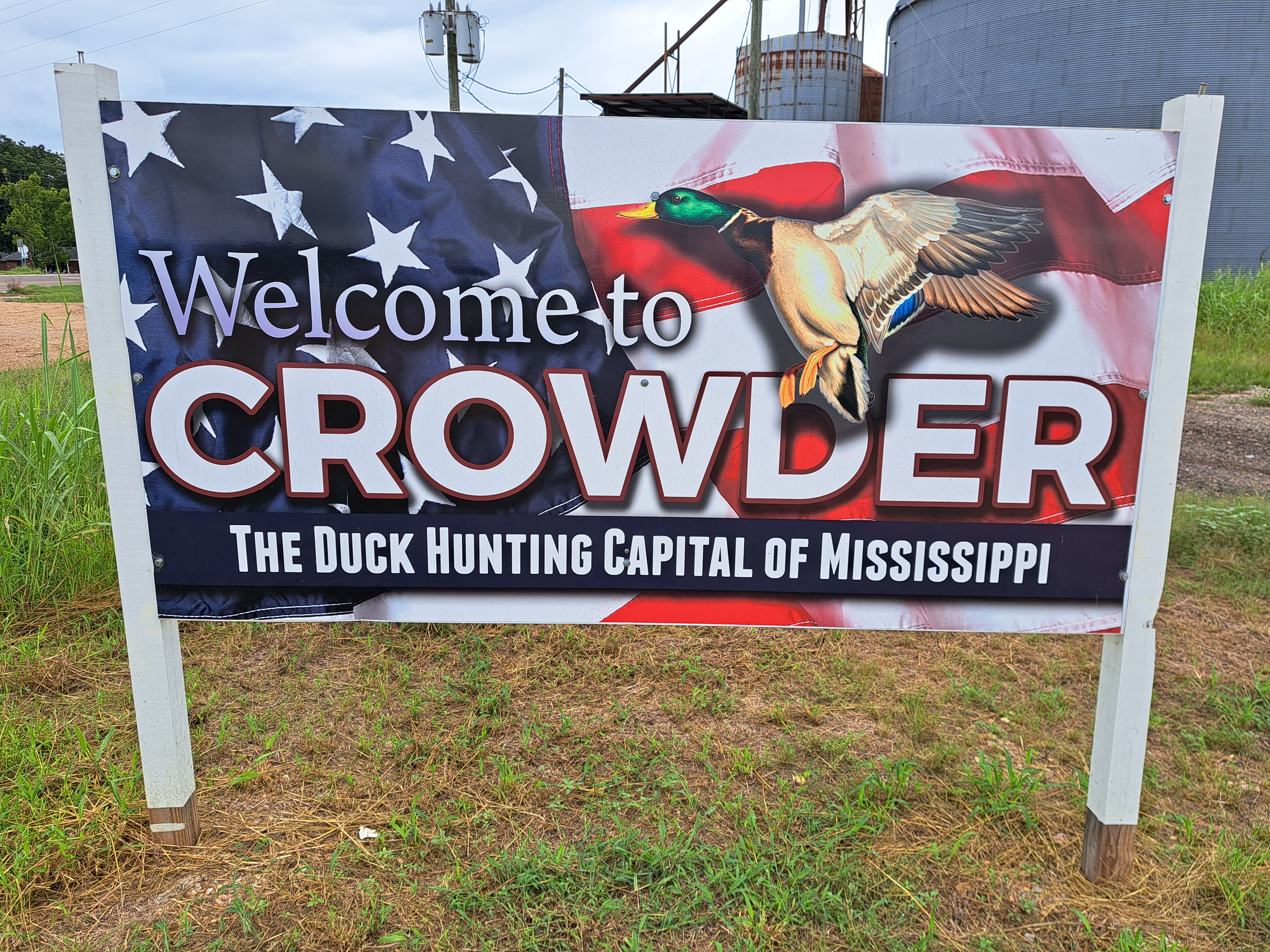
- The infamous welcome sign near downtown Crowder
- Nickname: Crowder Critters
- Location of Crowder, Mississippi

- Location in the United States
- Coordinates: 34°10′23″N 90°8′11″W
- Country: United States
- State: Mississippi
- Counties: Quitman, Panola

Government
  - Mayor: Griffin Rico

Area
  - Total: 0.46 sq mi (1.18 km^{2})
  - Land: 0.46 sq mi (1.18 km^{2})
  - Water: 0 sq mi (0.00 km^{2})
- Elevation: 161 ft (49 m)

Population (2020)
  - Total: 573
  - Density: 1,255.6/sq mi (484.78/km^{2})
- Time zone: UTC-6 (Central (CST))
  - Summer (DST): UTC-5 (CDT)
- ZIP code: 38622
- Area code: 662
- FIPS code: 28-16940
- GNIS feature ID: 2406342

Crowder is a town in Panola and Quitman counties in the state of Mississippi. As of the 2020 census, Crowder had a population of 573.

== Geography ==
Most of Crowder is in Quitman County with a portion on the east in adjacent Panola County. In the 2000 census, 462 of the town's 766 residents (60.3%) lived in Quitman County and 304 (39.7%) in Panola County.

According to the United States Census Bureau, the town has a total area of 0.4 square miles (1.2 km^{2}, all land.

== Demographics ==
Historical population
Census	Pop.	Note	%±
1920	388		—
1930	377		−2.8%
1940	454		20.4%
1950	476		4.8%
1960	528		10.9%
1970	815		54.4%
1980	789		−3.2%
1990	758		−3.9%
2000	766		1.1%
2010	712		−7.0%
2020	573		−19.5%
U.S. Decennial Census

=== 2020 census ===
Crowder racial composition
Race	Num.	Perc.
White (non-Hispanic)	194	33.86%
Black or African American (non-Hispanic)	359	62.65%
Other/Mixed	11	1.92%
Hispanic or Latino	9	1.57%

As of the 2020 United States census, there were 573 people, 331 households, and 213 families residing in the town.

=== 2000 census ===
As of the census of 2000, there were 766 people, 309 households, and 198 families residing in the town. The population density was 1,690.7 inhabitants per square mile (652.8/km^{2}). There were 334 housing units at an average density of 737.2 per square mile (284.6/km^{2}). The racial makeup of the town was 53.13% White, 46.34% African American, 0.13% Pacific Islander, and 0.39% from two or more races. Hispanic or Latino of any race were 0.26% of the population.

There were 309 households, out of which 34.0% had children under the age of 18 living with them, 35.6% were married couples living together, 21.0% had a female householder with no husband present, and 35.9% were non-families. 32.7% of all households were made up of individuals, and 16.5% had someone living alone who was 65 years of age or older. The average household size was 2.48 and the average family size was 3.19.

In the town, the population was spread out, with 31.1% under the age of 18, 9.7% from 18 to 24, 26.6% from 25 to 44, 20.5% from 45 to 64, and 12.1% who were 65 years of age or older. The median age was 33 years. For every 100 females, there were 89.1 males. For every 100 females age 18 and over, there were 85.3 males.

The median income for a household in the town was $14,427, and the median income for a family was $27,143. Males had a median income of $26,667 versus $20,391 for females. The per capita income for the town was $10,534. About 32.6% of families and 37.6% of the population were below the poverty line, including 44.0% of those under age 18 and 37.3% of those age 65 or over.

== Education ==
The Quitman County portion of Crowder is served by the Quitman County School District and the Panola County portion is served by the South Panola School District.
