= Quitman County School District (Mississippi) =

School district in Mississippi, United States

Madison S. Palmer High School

Location
- 1513 Martin Luther King Jr. Drive; Marks, (Quitman County), Mississippi 38646; United States
- Coordinates: 34.241356°N 90.278116°W

Information
- Type: Public high school
- Principal: Tiffany Thomas
- Staff: 16.93 (FTE)
- Enrollment: 224 (2023-24)
- Student to teacher ratio: 13.23
- Colors: Red and gold
- Nickname: Dragons
- Website: Madison S. Palmer High School

The Quitman County School District is a public school district based in Marks, Mississippi (USA). The district's boundaries are the same as Quitman County. The District's only high school ranks 189th out of 237 High Schools in Mississippi.

== Schools ==
- Madison S Palmer High School (Marks; Grades 9–12)
- Quitman County Middle School (Marks; Grades 5–8)
- Quitman County Elementary School (Lambert; Grades Pre-k-4)

The middle school was previously named Marks Middle School. Some time prior to 1999 the school converted a former restroom facility into a library because it was unable to get sufficient state funding to build a wholly new library. Circa 1999 the school could not find a librarian willing to move to Marks to staff the library, reflecting the general dearth of teachers in the Mississippi Delta.

== Demographics ==
On July 24, 1969, federal judge William Keady found that Quitman County school officials were maintaining an unconstitutional de jure racially segregated school system, and he placed the school board under the supervision of United States District Court for the Northern District of Mississippi. As of 1993, this order had not been set aside. In March 1991, the school board asked the district court for permission to close Crowder elementary and junior high school, a majority-white school. The court gave permission, and a group of parents sued for an injunction to prevent the closing. The district court denied them an injunction, and this decision was affirmed by the United States Court of Appeals for the Fifth Circuit.

By 1975, the majority of African-American students in Quitman County were attending public schools, which had earlier been segregated. But the majority of white students had been moved into newly established private academies. This situation has continued; in 2007 the Mississippi Department of Education found that the students in the district were 97.92% African American, 1.81% White, and 0.27% Hispanic.

Schools in Quitman County are effectively segregated by race. White students almost exclusively attend private schools while Black children attend the local public schools.

School	Total Students	White Students	Black Students	Note
Quitman County	10,117	30.47%	68.62%	2010 Census
Delta Academy (Private)	175	147 (84%)	17 (9.7%)	
M. S. Palmer High School (Public)	351	4 (1%)	347 (98.8%)	

=== 2006-07 school year ===
There were a total of 1,490 students enrolled in the Quitman County School District during the 2006–2007 school year. The gender makeup of the district was 49% female and 51% male. The racial makeup of the district was 97.92% African American, 1.81% White, and 0.27% Hispanic. 99.9% of the district's students were eligible to receive free lunch.

=== Previous school years ===
School Year	Enrollment	Gender Makeup		Racial Makeup				
School Year	Enrollment	Female	Male	Asian	African American	Hispanic	Native American	White
2005-06	1,549	49%	51%	–	96.77%	0.71%	–	2.52%
2004-05	1,586	49%	51%	–	97.23%	0.63%	0.06%	2.08%
2003-04	1,604	48%	52%	–	97.57%	0.75%	–	1.68%
2002-03	1,596	49%	51%	0.06%	97.93%	0.50%	0.06%	1.44%

== Accountability statistics ==
	2006-07	2005-06	2004-05	2003-04	2002-03
District Accreditation Status	Accredited	Accredited	Accredited	Accredited	Probation
School Performance Classifications
Level 5 (Superior Performing) Schools	0	0	0	0	0
Level 4 (Exemplary) Schools	0	0	0	0	0
Level 3 (Successful) Schools	2	1	2	3	1
Level 2 (Under Performing) Schools	1	1	1	0	1
Level 1 (Low Performing) Schools	0	1	0	0	1
Not Assigned	0	0	0	0	0

== School uniforms ==
On August 6, 2003, as per the school board's decision, school uniforms began to be mandatory for students at Quitman County Middle School On August 11, 2003, uniforms became mandatory at Quitman County Elementary. Strict enforcement at both schools began in January 2004.

== See also ==
- List of school districts in Mississippi
