= Lambert, Mississippi =

- Town
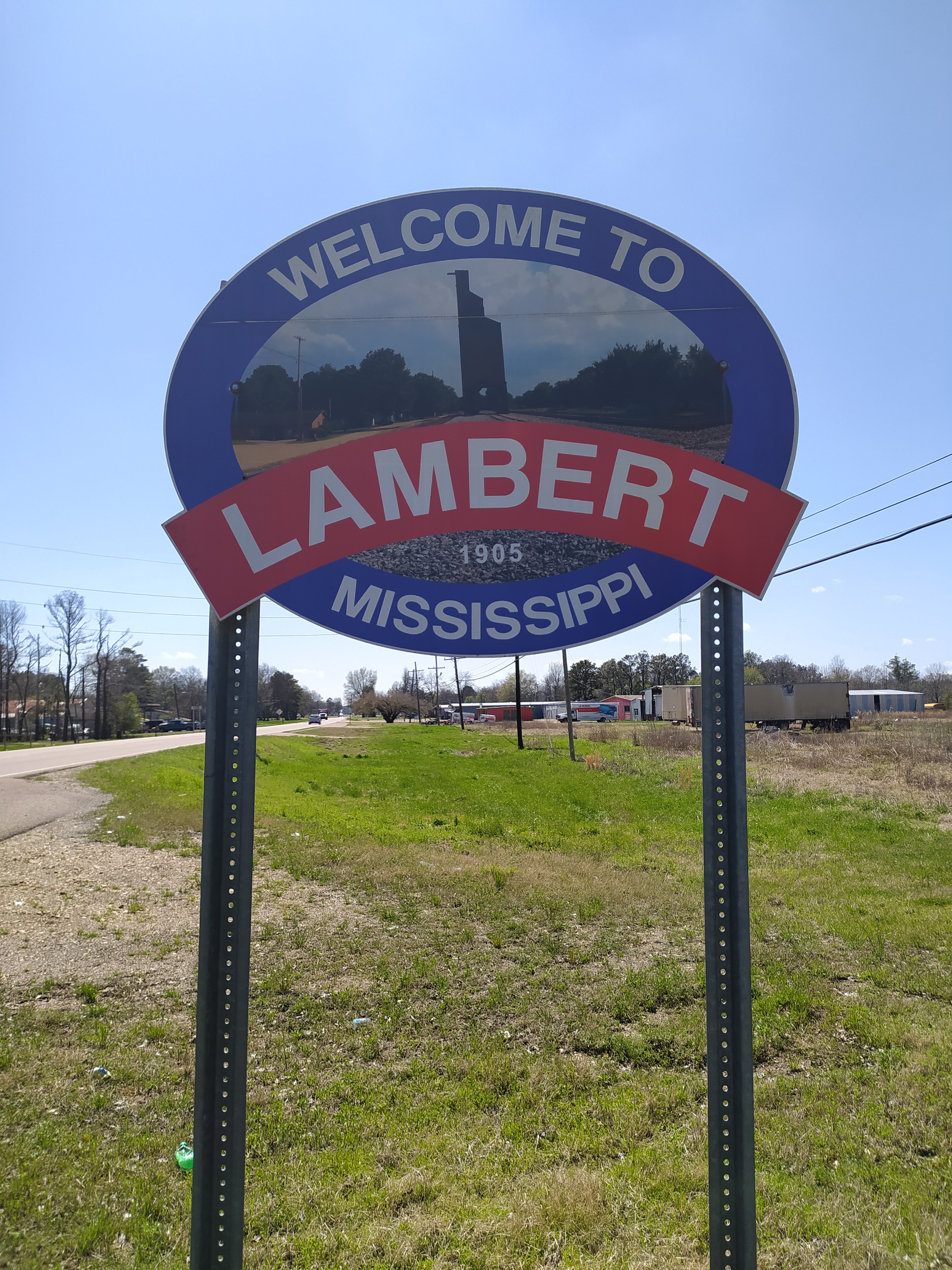
- Lambert's welcome sign on Mississippi Highway 3

- Flag

- Location of Lambert, Mississippi

- Location in the United States
- Coordinates: 34°12′02″N 90°17′04″W
- Country: United States
- State: Mississippi
- County: Quitman

Area
  - Total: 0.85 sq mi (2.19 km^{2})
  - Land: 0.85 sq mi (2.19 km^{2})
  - Water: 0 sq mi (0.00 km^{2})
- Elevation: 154 ft (47 m)

Population (2020)
  - Total: 1,273
  - Density: 1,504.3/sq mi (580.83/km^{2})
- Time zone: UTC-6 (Central (CST))
  - Summer (DST): UTC-5 (CDT)
- ZIP code: 38643
- Area code: 662
- FIPS code: 28-39080
- GNIS feature ID: 2405982
- Website: townoflambert.com

Lambert is a town in Quitman County, Mississippi. The population was 1,273 at the 2020 census.

== Geography ==
According to the United States Census Bureau, the town has a total area of 0.8 square miles (2.1 km^{2}), all land.

=== Climate ===
The climate in this area is characterized by hot, humid summers and generally mild to cool winters. According to the Köppen Climate Classification system, Lambert has a humid subtropical climate, abbreviated "Cfa" on climate maps.

== Demographics ==
Historical population
| Census | Pop. | Note | %± |
|---|---|---|---|
| 1910 | 573 | | — |
| 1920 | 957 | | 67.0% |
| 1930 | 800 | | −16.4% |
| 1940 | 1,016 | | 27.0% |
| 1950 | 1,023 | | 0.7% |
| 1960 | 1,181 | | 15.4% |
| 1970 | 1,511 | | 27.9% |
| 1980 | 1,624 | | 7.5% |
| 1990 | 1,131 | | −30.4% |
| 2000 | 1,967 | | 73.9% |
| 2010 | 1,638 | | −16.7% |
| 2020 | 1,273 | | −22.3% |
U.S. Decennial Census

=== Racial and ethnic composition ===
Lambert town, Mississippi – Racial and ethnic composition Note: the US Census treats Hispanic/Latino as an ethnic category. This table excludes Latinos from the racial categories and assigns them to a separate category. Hispanics/Latinos may be of any race.
| Race / Ethnicity (NH = Non-Hispanic) | Pop 2000 | Pop 2010 | Pop 2020 | % 2000 | % 2010 | % 2020 |
|---|---|---|---|---|---|---|
| White alone (NH) | 303 | 180 | 63 | 15.40% | 10.99% | 4.95% |
| Black or African American alone (NH) | 1,626 | 1,447 | 1,169 | 82.66% | 88.34% | 91.83% |
| Native American or Alaska Native alone (NH) | 7 | 2 | 1 | 0.36% | 0.12% | 0.08% |
| Asian alone (NH) | 6 | 0 | 0 | 0.31% | 0.00% | 0.00% |
| Native Hawaiian or Pacific Islander alone (NH) | 0 | 0 | 2 | 0.00% | 0.00% | 0.16% |
| Other race alone (NH) | 0 | 0 | 2 | 0.00% | 0.00% | 0.16% |
| Mixed race or Multiracial (NH) | 15 | 2 | 31 | 0.76% | 0.12% | 2.44% |
| Hispanic or Latino (any race) | 10 | 7 | 5 | 0.51% | 0.43% | 0.39% |
| Total | 1,967 | 1,638 | 1,273 | 100.00% | 100.00% | 100.00% |

=== 2020 census ===
As of the 2020 United States census, there were 1,273 people, 584 households, and 301 families residing in the town.

=== 2000 census ===
As of the census of 2000, there were 1,967 people, 648 households, and 467 families residing in the town. The population density was 2,419.2 inhabitants per square mile (934.1/km^{2}). There were 676 housing units at an average density of 831.4 per square mile (321.0/km^{2}). The racial makeup of the town was 82.82% African American, 15.61% White, 0.36% Native American, 0.31% Asian, 0.10% from other races, and 0.81% from two or more races. Hispanic or Latino of any race were 0.51% of the population.

There were 648 households, out of which 37.7% had children under the age of 18 living with them, 28.7% were married couples living together, 36.4% had a female householder with no husband present, and 27.8% were non-families. 24.8% of all households were made up of individuals, and 12.0% had someone living alone who was 65 years of age or older. The average household size was 3.04 and the average family size was 3.67.

In the town, the population was spread out, with 36.2% under the age of 18, 10.7% from 18 to 24, 24.9% from 25 to 44, 17.1% from 45 to 64, and 11.1% who were 65 years of age or older. The median age was 28 years. For every 100 females, there were 78.2 males. For every 100 females age 18 and over, there were 66.1 males.

The median income for a household in the town was $18,077, and the median income for a family was $21,979. Males had a median income of $20,750 versus $17,250 for females. The per capita income for the town was $8,509. About 34.5% of families and 39.9% of the population were below the poverty line, including 50.1% of those under age 18 and 42.7% of those age 65 or over.

== Economy ==
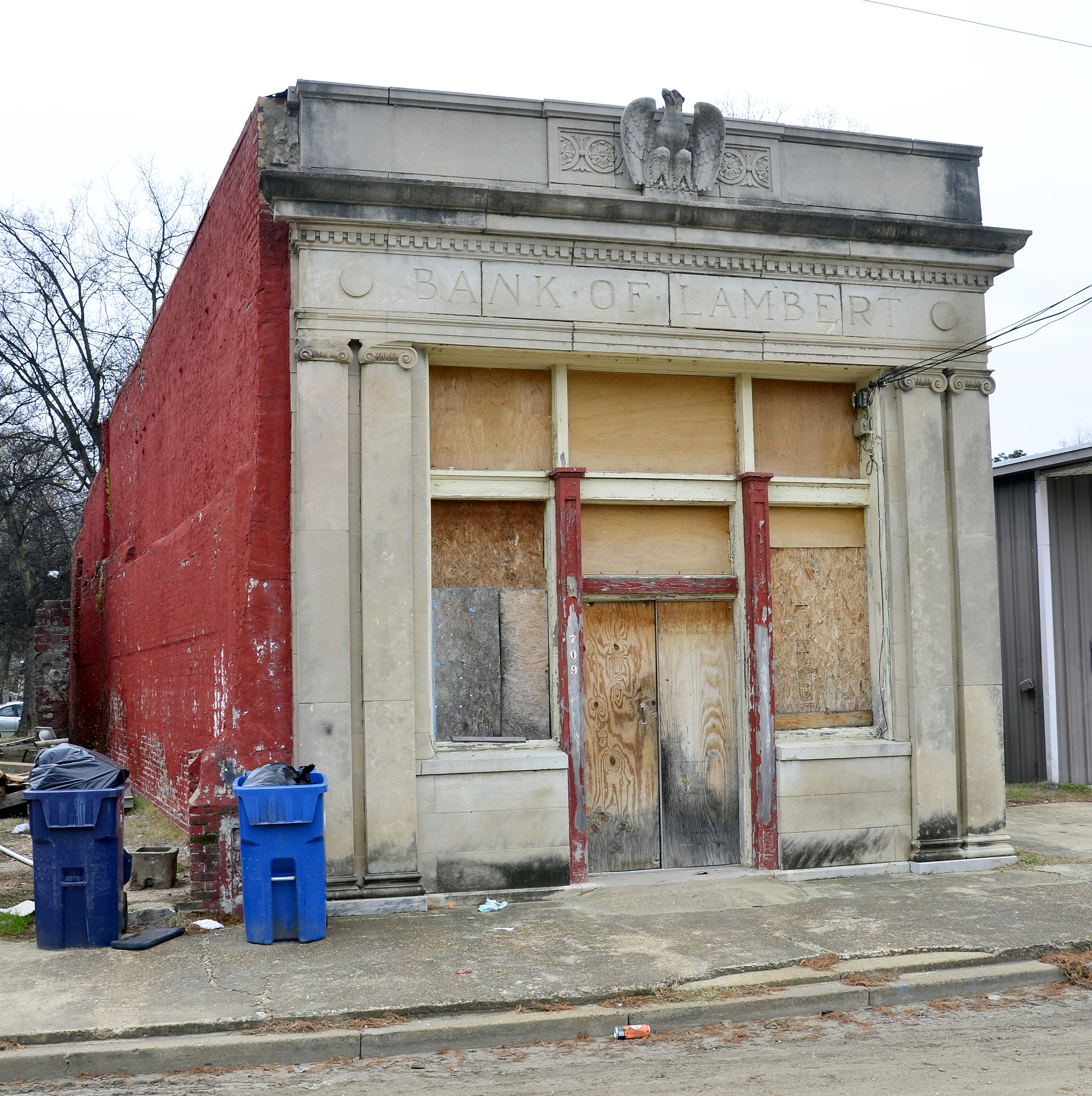
Abandoned Bank of Lambert

The Mississippi Department of Corrections (MDOC) operates the Quitman County Community Work Center (CWC) in an area near Lambert. In addition MDOC operates the Mississippi State Penitentiary (Parchman) in an unincorporated area in Sunflower County, in the area. Camp B, an inmate housing unit, was a satellite complex located away from the main Parchman prison property in unincorporated Quitman County, near Lambert. Camp B was one of Parchman's largest African-American housing units. Camp B's buildings have been demolished.

== Transportation ==
Amtrak’s City of New Orleans, which operates between New Orleans and Chicago, passes through the town on CN tracks, but makes no stop. The nearest station is located in Marks, 4 miles (6.4 km) to the north.

== Education ==
The Town of Lambert is served by the Quitman County School District. Quitman County Elementary School is in Lambert.

== Notable people ==
- Big Jack Johnson, Delta blues musician
- Oris Mays, preacher, songwriter, gospel singer
- Horace Mitchell, president of California State University, Bakersfield
- Snooky Pryor – Blues harp player.
- Ula B. Ross, member of the Mississippi House of Representatives from 1916 to 1920
- Anthony Steen, former NFL center
- Lezlye Zupkus – Member of the Connecticut House of Representatives
