= Marks station =

Railway station in Marks, Mississippi

Marks, MS
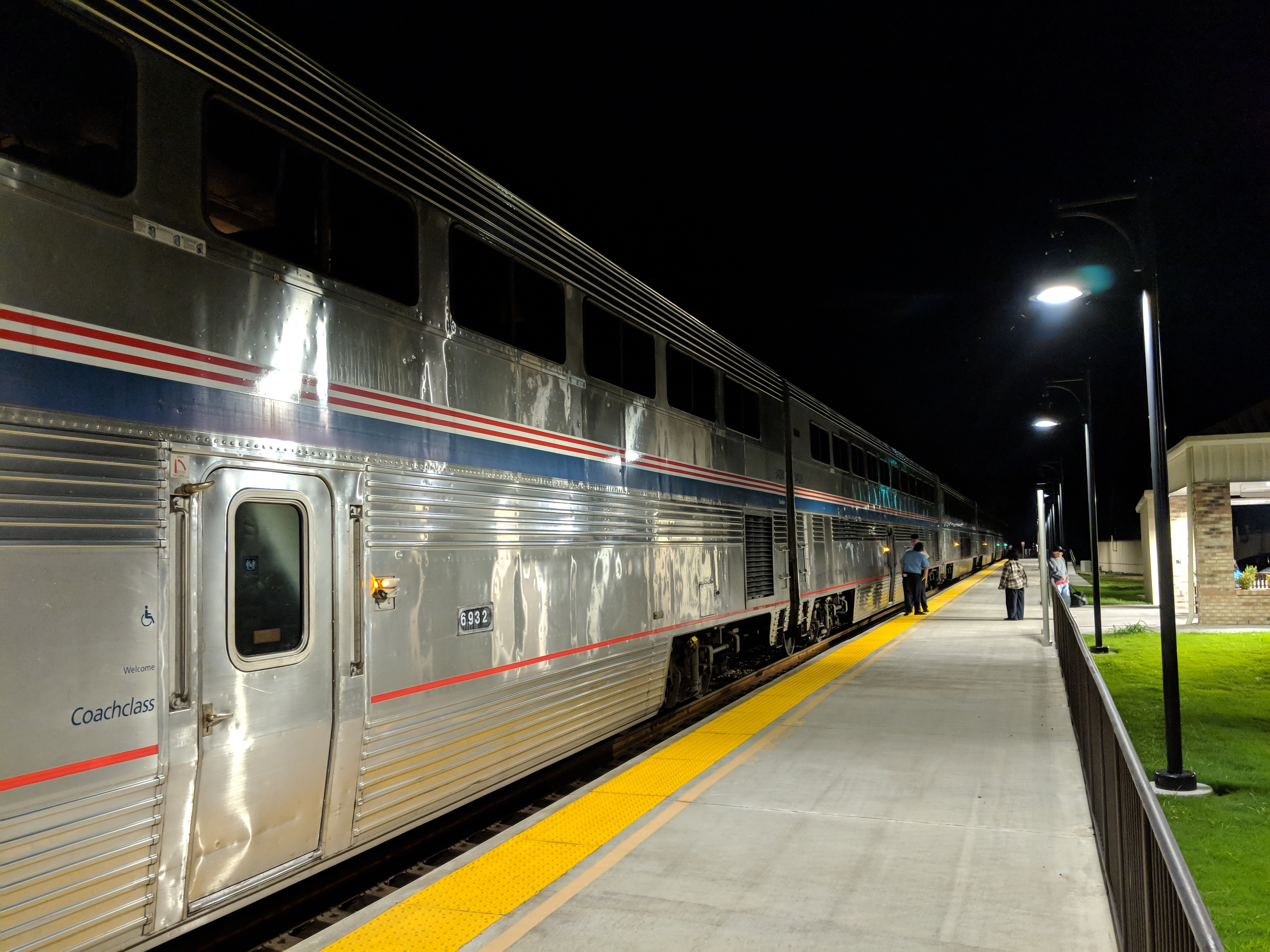
- The City of New Orleans at Marks station in September 2018

General information
- Location: 285 Cherry Street; Marks, Mississippi; United States
- Coordinates: 34°15′30″N 90°16′20″W
- Line: Canadian National Railway
- Platforms: 1 side platform
- Tracks: 1

Construction
- Accessible: yes

Other information
- Status: Flag stop
- Station code: Amtrak: MKS

History
- Opened: May 4, 2018

Passengers
- FY 2025: 5,455 (Amtrak)

Services
Preceding station	Amtrak	Following station
Greenwood toward New Orleans	City of New Orleans	Memphis toward Chicago
Location

Marks station is a passenger rail train station in Marks, Mississippi. The station is located on Amtrak's City of New Orleans line. The station opened on May 4, 2018.

The Illinois Central Gulf railroad did not operate passenger trains through Marks Mississippi before Amtrak, so there was no station here. The development for the Marks train station is a culmination of two decades of work by civic leaders in Quitman County, Mississippi. Initially, $79,500 in funds from the City of Marks and Quitman County were used to construct a platform with wheelchair access and a glass and steel "Amshack" structure. County leaders had hoped the train stops would commence in September 1999. In 2010, Mississippi Senator Roger Wicker met with Canadian National Railway (CN) officials to negotiate a flag-stop in Marks. Senator Wicker announced in 2015 that an agreement had been reached by Quitman County, Amtrak, and Canadian National to establish a permanent stop in Marks. To construct the $1.2 million station, a number of grants were awarded. A $500,000 grant was allocated by the Federal Highway Administration (FHWA) via the Mississippi Department of Transportation (MDOT), a 20% matching grant from Mississippi Development Authority that was worth $150,000, and a $300,000 grant from the Delta Regional Authority. Groundbreaking for the station occurred in October 2016. The station's ribbon cutting and maiden stop took place on May 4, 2018.
