= Marks, Mississippi =

- City
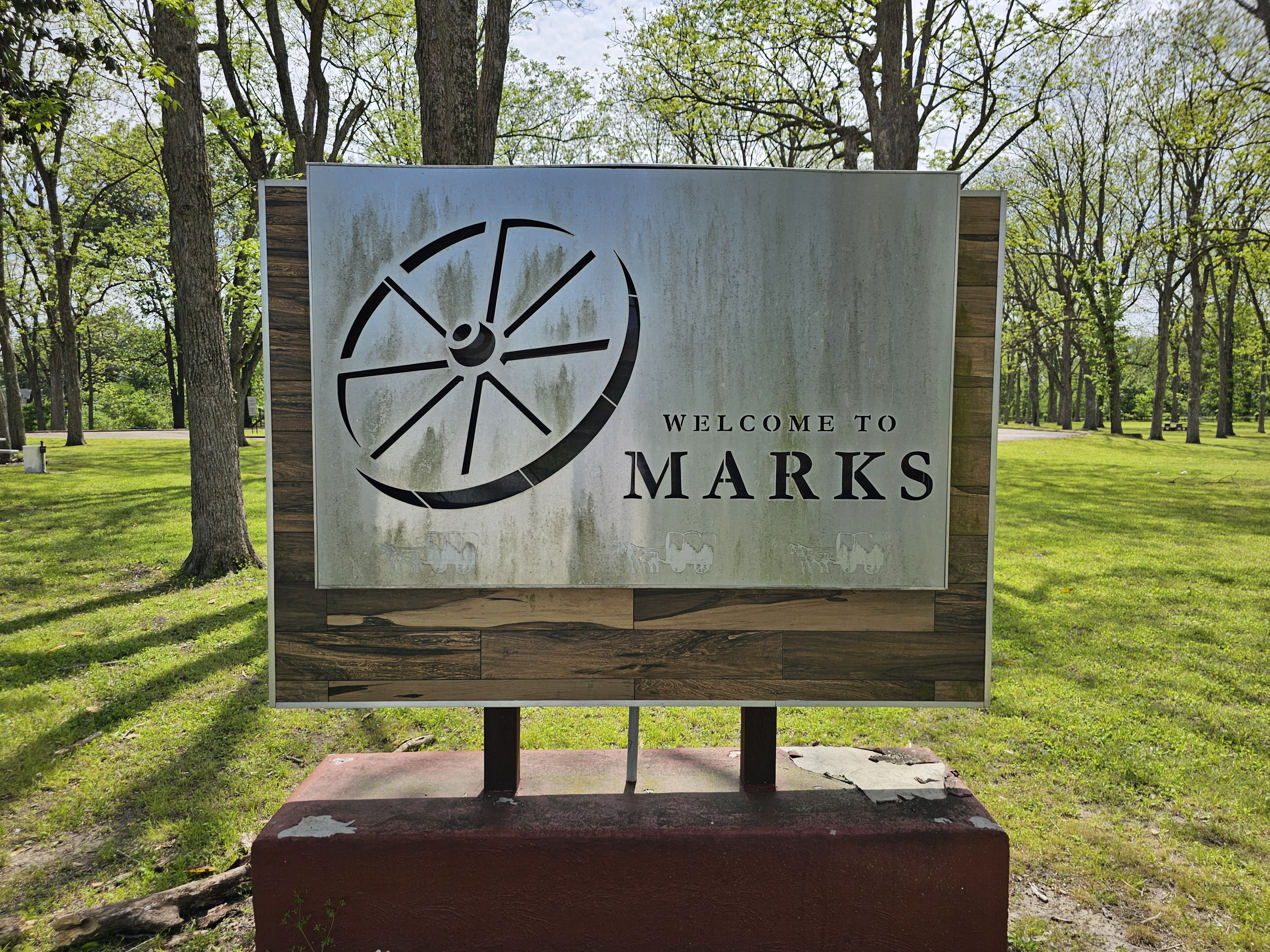
- Welcome sign in Marks located on Mississippi Highway 3 South

- Location of Marks, Mississippi

- Location in the United States
- Coordinates: 34°15′05″N 90°16′10″W
- Country: United States
- State: Mississippi
- County: Quitman

Area
  - Total: 1.28 sq mi (3.32 km^{2})
  - Land: 1.28 sq mi (3.32 km^{2})
  - Water: 0 sq mi (0.00 km^{2})
- Elevation: 161 ft (49 m)

Population (2020)
  - Total: 1,444
  - Density: 1,125.8/sq mi (434.69/km^{2})
- Time zone: UTC-6 (Central (CST))
  - Summer (DST): UTC-5 (CDT)
- ZIP code: 38646
- Area code: 662
- FIPS code: 28-45240
- GNIS feature ID: 2405026

Marks is a city in and the county seat of Quitman County, Mississippi. As of the 2020 census, the city population was 1,444.

== History ==
The town of Marks was named after Leopold Marks (1851–1910) who left Germany to avoid conscription by the German army. He arrived in New York in 1868. Marks, a Jew, became Quitman County's first representative to the state legislature and served for eight years. He encouraged the Yazoo and Mississippi Valley Railroad to come to the area by giving the railroad company, without cost, the right-of-way through his plantation plus 10 acres (40,000 m^{2}) of land. Leopold Marks' son Henry donated land to the town to be used as a cemetery.

The official "founding" of the town is considered to be May 12, 1907; on May 12, 2007, the town celebrated its centennial.

On September 26, 1913, a black man named Walter Brownloe, accused of attacking a white farmer's wife, was taken from the town prison by a mob and hanged.

Marks was the starting point of Dr. Martin Luther King Jr's Poor People's Campaign in 1968.

Amtrak's City of New Orleans began stopping at Marks on April 4, 2018. A new station was built for passengers to get on or get off.

== Geography ==
According to the United States Census Bureau, the city has a total area of 1.0 square mile (2.6 km^{2}), all land.

=== Climate ===
Climate data for Marks, Mississippi
Month	Jan	Feb	Mar	Apr	May	Jun	Jul	Aug	Sep	Oct	Nov	Dec	Year
Record high °F (°C)	86 (30)	84 (29)	90 (32)	94 (34)	101 (38)	107 (42)	108 (42)	109 (43)	107 (42)	97 (36)	93 (34)	81 (27)	109 (43)
Mean daily maximum °F (°C)	49 (9)	55 (13)	64 (18)	73 (23)	81 (27)	89 (32)	92 (33)	91 (33)	85 (29)	76 (24)	63 (17)	53 (12)	73 (23)
Mean daily minimum °F (°C)	31 (−1)	34 (1)	42 (6)	50 (10)	60 (16)	68 (20)	71 (22)	69 (21)	62 (17)	50 (10)	41 (5)	34 (1)	51 (11)
Record low °F (°C)	−8 (−22)	0 (−18)	13 (−11)	29 (−2)	34 (1)	48 (9)	52 (11)	52 (11)	36 (2)	26 (−3)	13 (−11)	−2 (−19)	−8 (−22)
Average precipitation inches (mm)	4.98 (126)	4.51 (115)	5.64 (143)	5.08 (129)	5.71 (145)	4.97 (126)	3.85 (98)	2.95 (75)	3.14 (80)	3.22 (82)	5.26 (134)	5.50 (140)	54.81 (1,392)
Average snowfall inches (cm)	0.4 (1.0)	0.2 (0.51)	0.1 (0.25)	0 (0)	0 (0)	0 (0)	0 (0)	0 (0)	0 (0)	0 (0)	0 (0)	0.2 (0.51)	0.9 (2.3)

== Demographics ==
Historical population
Census	Pop.	Note	%±
1910	670		—
1920	1,020		52.2%
1930	1,258		23.3%
1940	1,818		44.5%
1950	2,209		21.5%
1960	2,572		16.4%
1970	2,609		1.4%
1980	2,260		−13.4%
1990	1,758		−22.2%
2000	1,551		−11.8%
2010	1,735		11.9%
2020	1,444		−16.8%
U.S. Decennial Census

=== Racial and ethnic composition ===
Marks city, Mississippi – Racial and ethnic composition Note: the US Census treats Hispanic/Latino as an ethnic category. This table excludes Latinos from the racial categories and assigns them to a separate category. Hispanics/Latinos may be of any race.
Race / Ethnicity (NH = Non-Hispanic)	Pop 2000	Pop 2010	Pop 2020	% 2000	% 2010	% 2020
White alone (NH)	536	549	381	34.56%	31.64%	26.39%
Black or African American alone (NH)	998	1,159	1,031	64.35%	66.80%	71.40%
Native American or Alaska Native alone (NH)	1	6	0	0.06%	0.35%	0.00%
Asian alone (NH)	3	3	4	0.19%	0.17%	0.28%
Native Hawaiian or Pacific Islander alone (NH)	0	0	0	0.00%	0.00%	0.00%
Other race alone (NH)	0	0	1	0.00%	0.00%	0.07%
Mixed race or Multiracial (NH)	7	10	22	0.45%	0.58%	1.52%
Hispanic or Latino (any race)	6	8	5	0.39%	0.46%	0.35%
Total	1,551	1,735	1,444	100.00%	100.00%	100.00%

=== 2020 census ===
As of the 2020 United States census, there were 1,444 people, 699 households, and 425 families residing in the city.

=== 2000 census ===
As of the census of 2000, there were 1,551 people, 579 households, and 387 families residing in the city. The population density was 1,509.9 inhabitants per square mile (583.0/km^{2}). There were 643 housing units at an average density of 625.9 per square mile (241.7/km^{2}). The racial makeup of the city was 34.62% White, 64.67% African American, 0.06% Native American, 0.19% Asian, and 0.45% from two or more races. Hispanic or Latino of any race were 0.39% of the population.

There were 579 households, out of which 33.0% had children under the age of 18 living with them, 32.0% were married couples living together, 29.2% had a female householder with no husband present, and 33.0% were non-families. 29.7% of all households were made up of individuals, and 13.0% had someone living alone who was 65 years of age or older. The average household size was 2.55 and the average family size was 3.16.

In the city, the population was spread out, with 28.7% under the age of 18, 8.4% from 18 to 24, 26.8% from 25 to 44, 16.7% from 45 to 64, and 19.3% who were 65 years of age or older. The median age was 35 years. For every 100 females, there were 81.6 males. For every 100 females age 18 and over, there were 73.1 males.

The median income for a household in the city was $20,521, and the median income for a family was $27,153. Males had a median income of $25,100 versus $16,985 for females. The per capita income for the city was $11,104. About 26.1% of families and 30.3% of the population were below the poverty line, including 39.9% of those under age 18 and 27.7% of those age 65 or over.

== Education ==
The City of Marks is served by the Quitman County School District.

Delta Academy, a private school, is in Marks.

== Notable people ==
- Dawn H. Beam, Associate Justice of the Supreme Court of Mississippi
- Larry Garron, Professional football player
- Reginald Jackson, member of the Mississippi Senate
- Robert L. Jackson, former member of the Mississippi Senate from 2004 to 2024. Father of Reginald Jackson.
- Charles Lipson, political scientist who is professor emeritus of political science at the University of Chicago
- Frederick W. Smith, Founder and CEO of FedEx Corporation
- Carolyn Stanford Taylor, Wisconsin Superintendent of Public Instruction

== Gallery ==
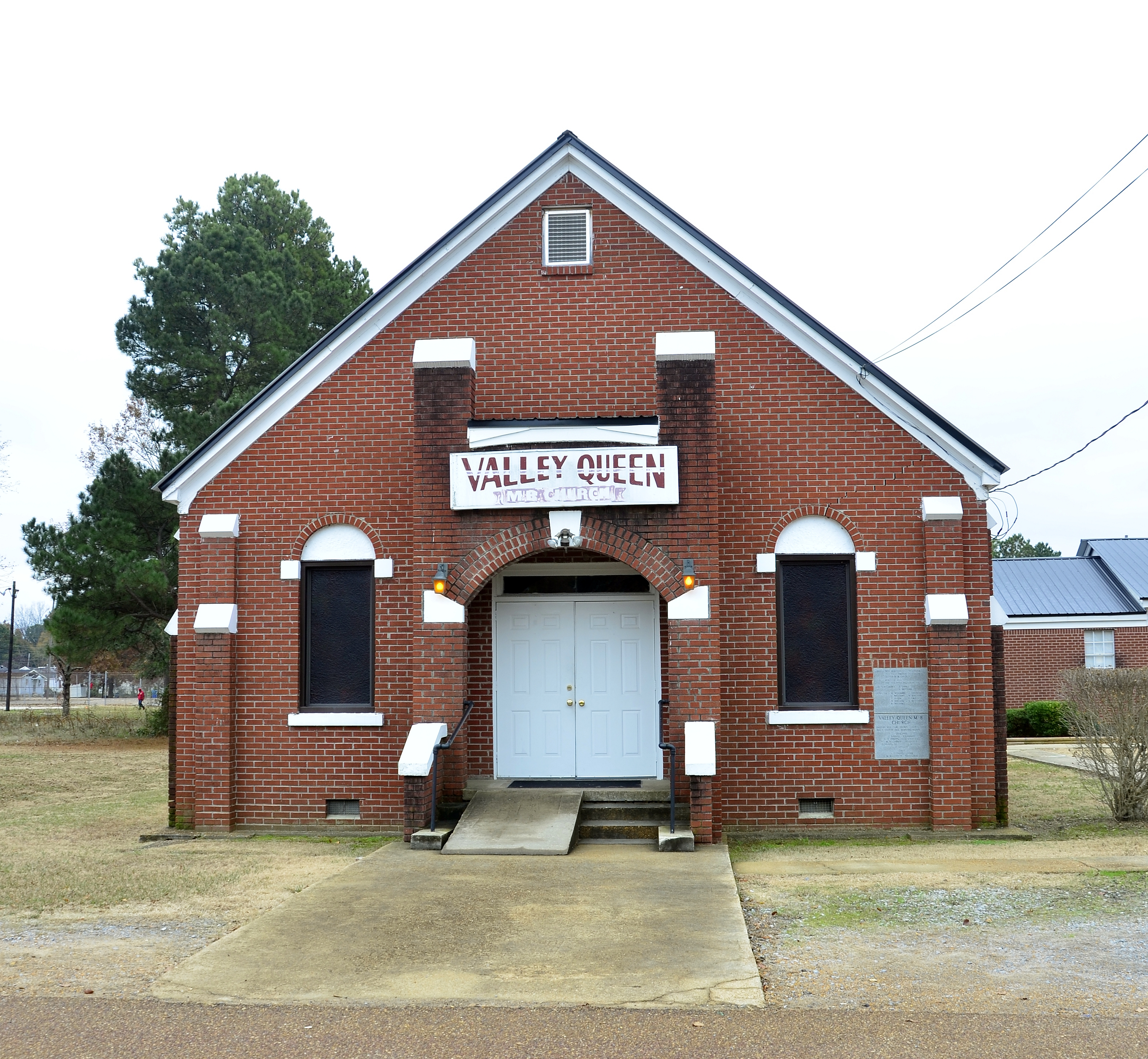
Martin Luther King Jr. conducted a memorial service at Valley Queen Missionary Baptist Church in Marks in 1966.

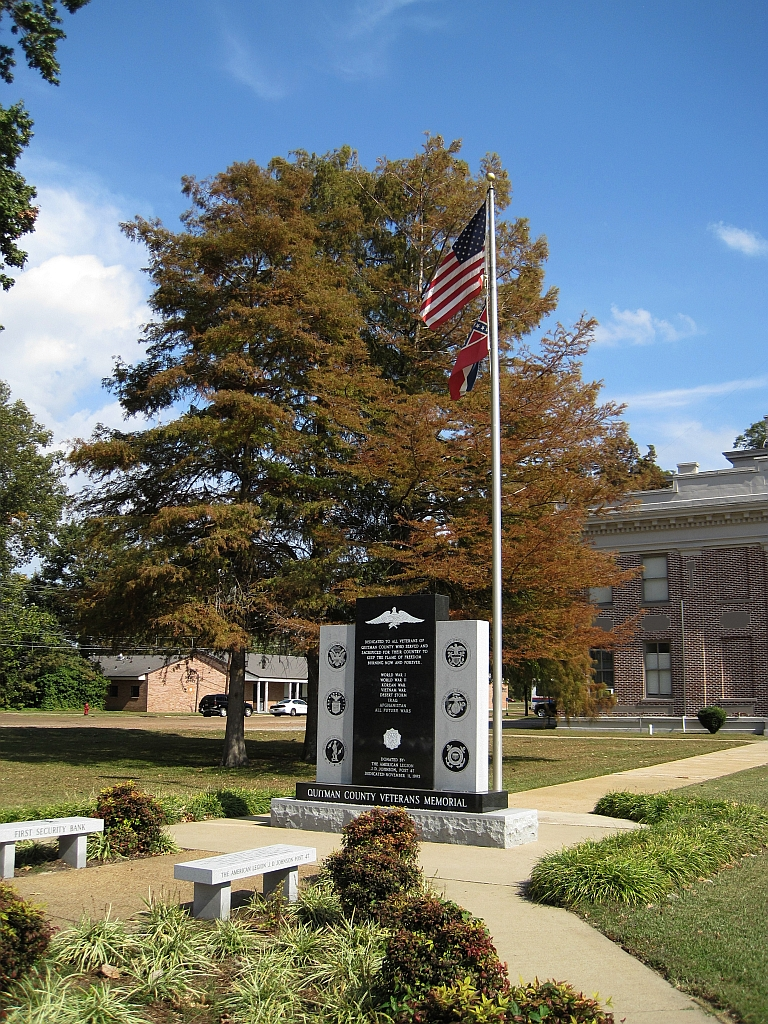
Veterans Memorial

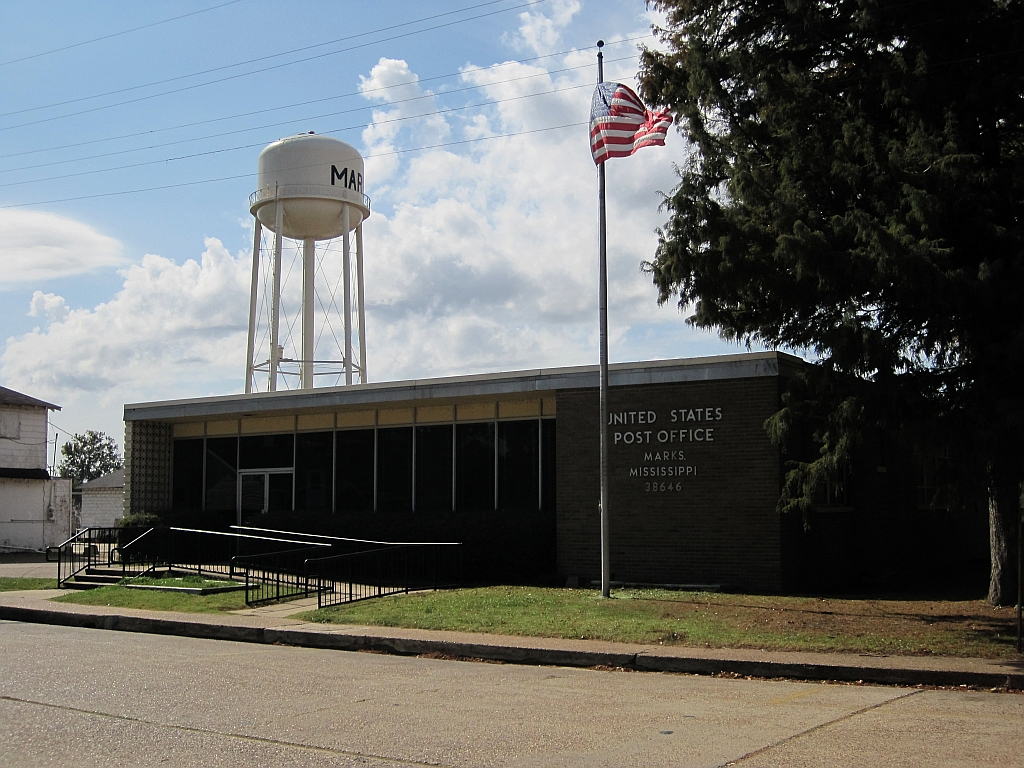
Post office

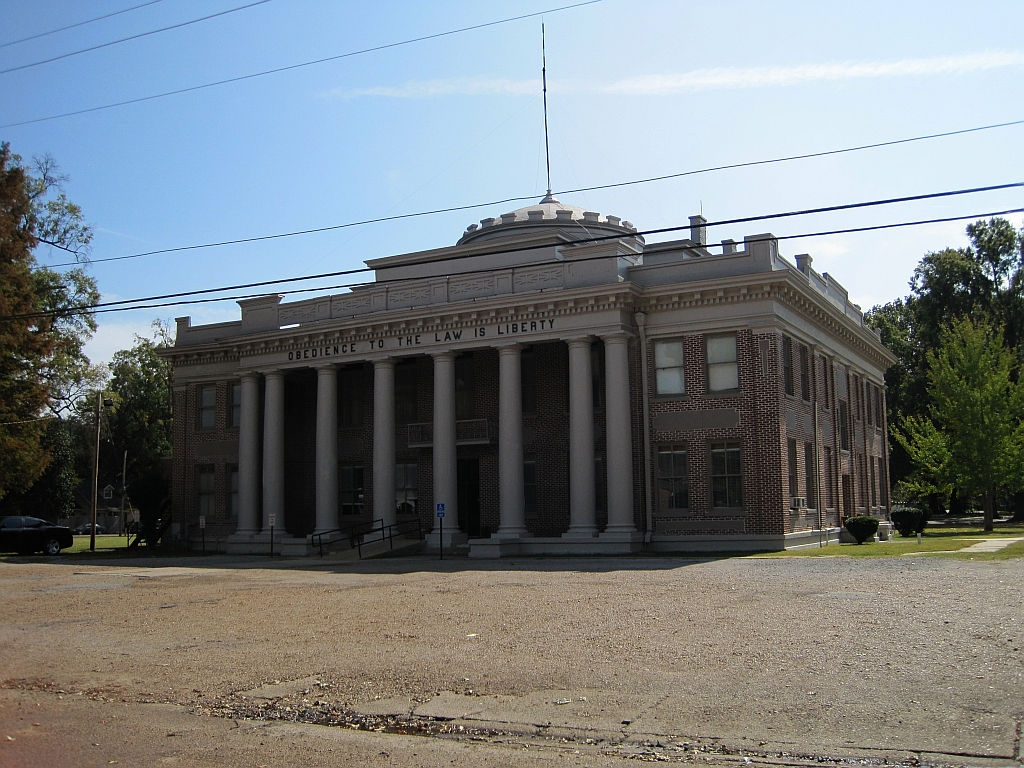
Courthouse

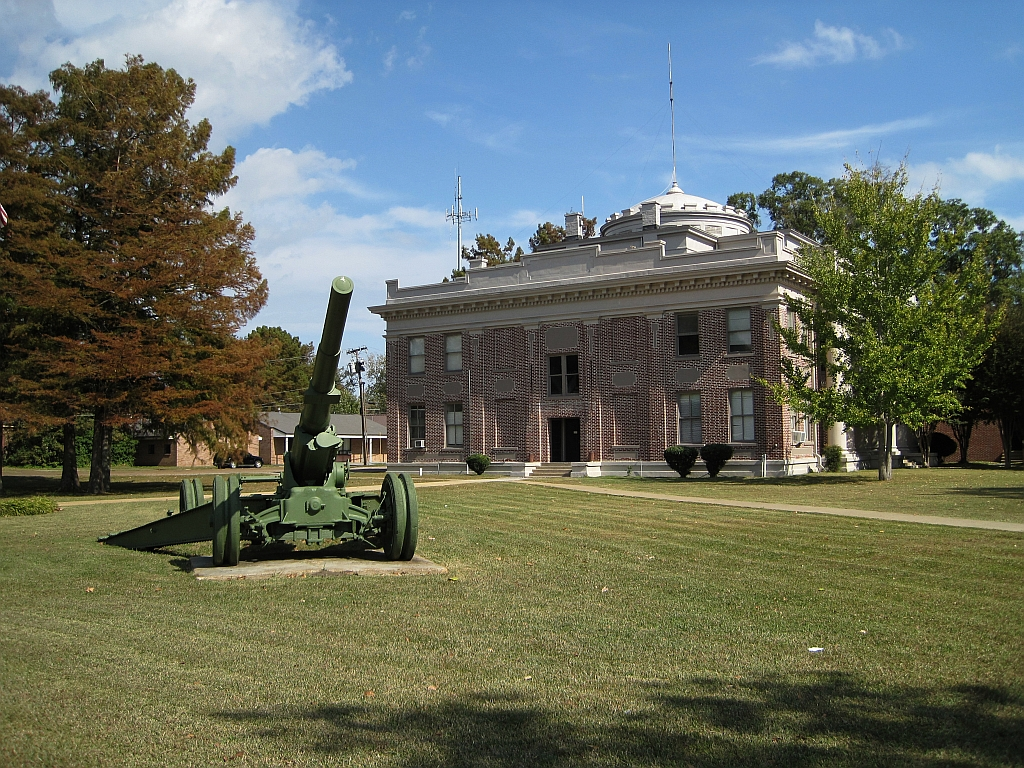
Memorial

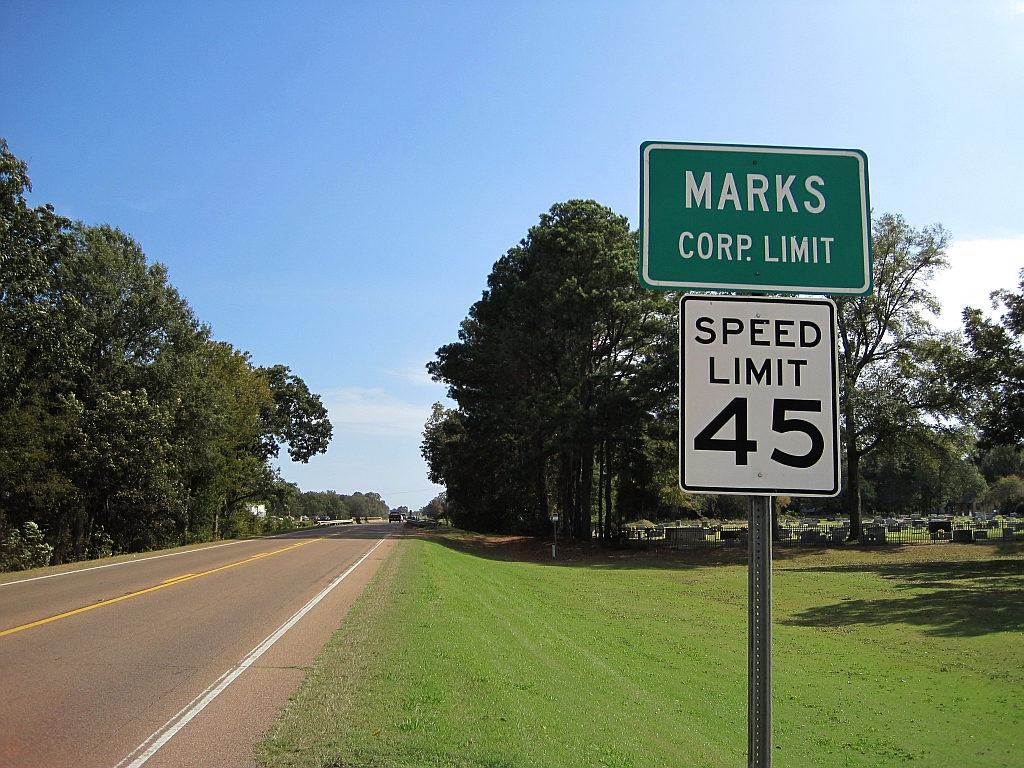
Road sign

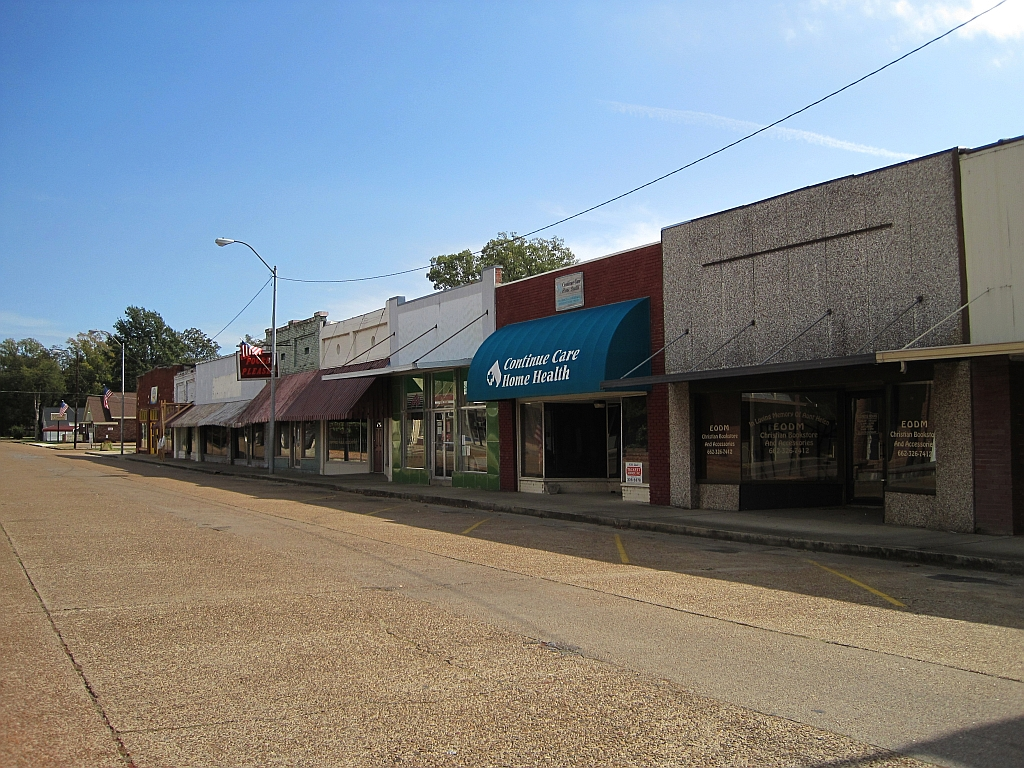
Main Street

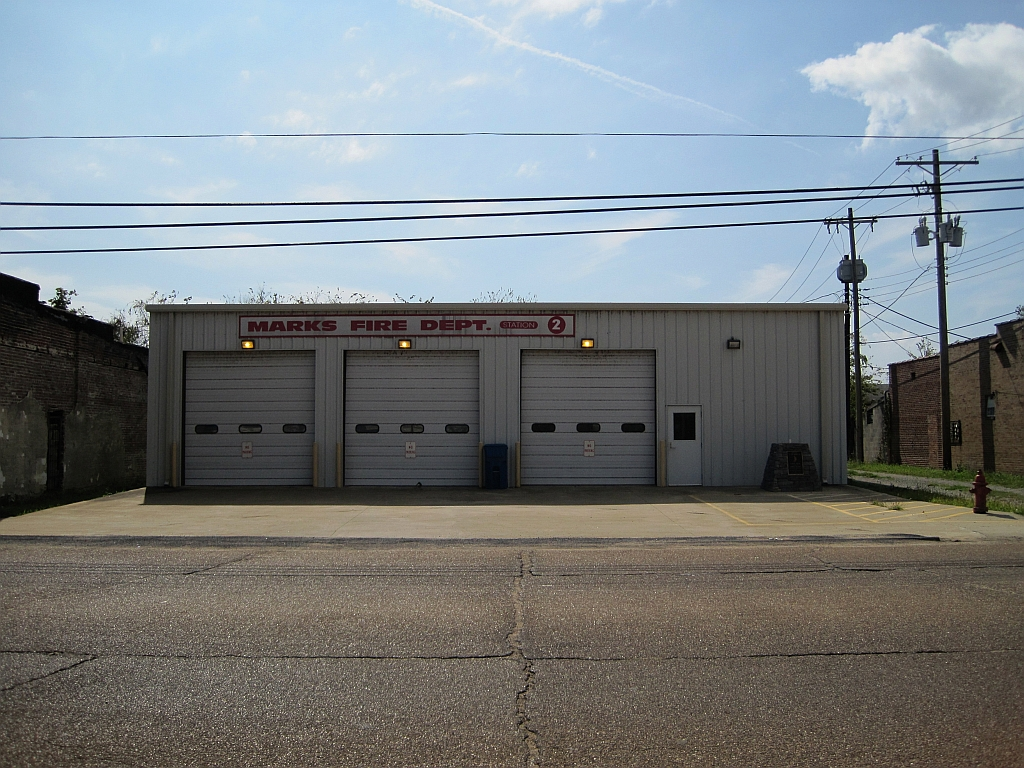
Fire hall
