= List of United States tornadoes from January to March 2020 =

United States tornadoes from January to March 2020
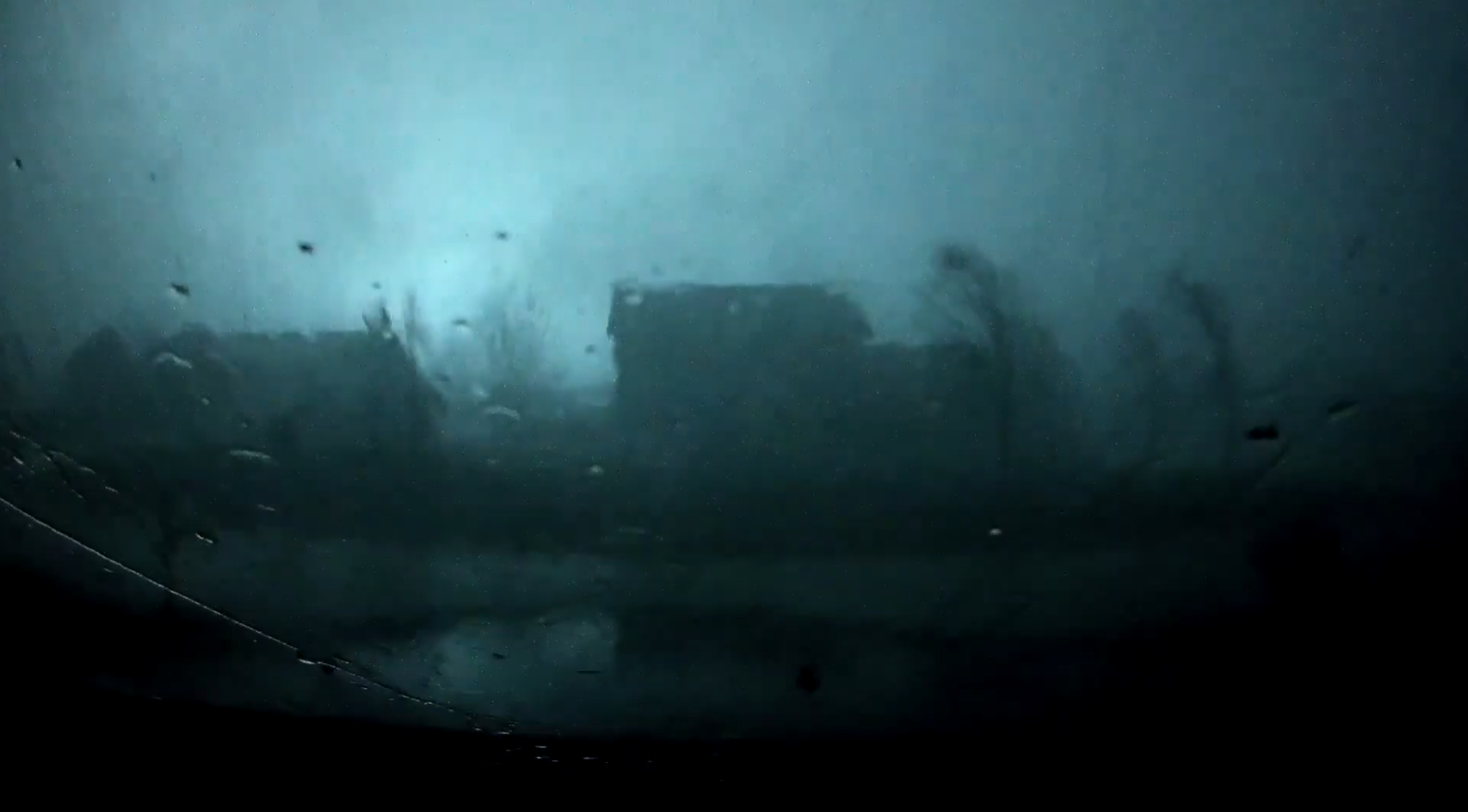
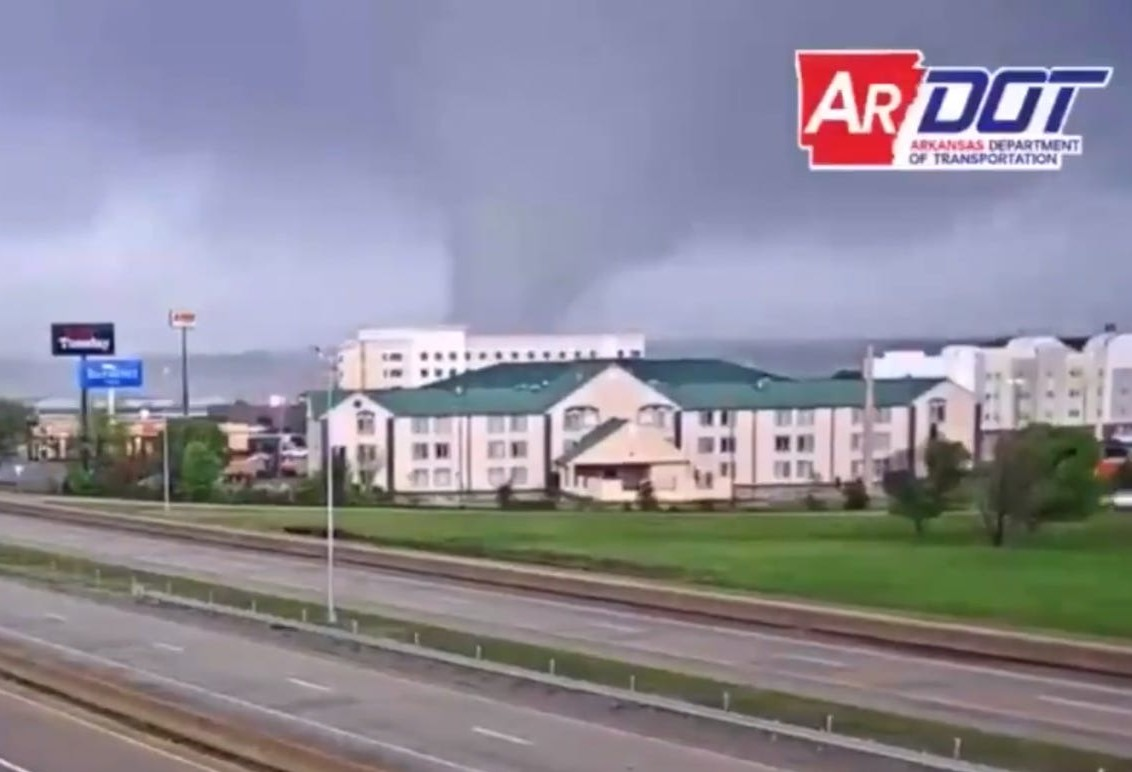
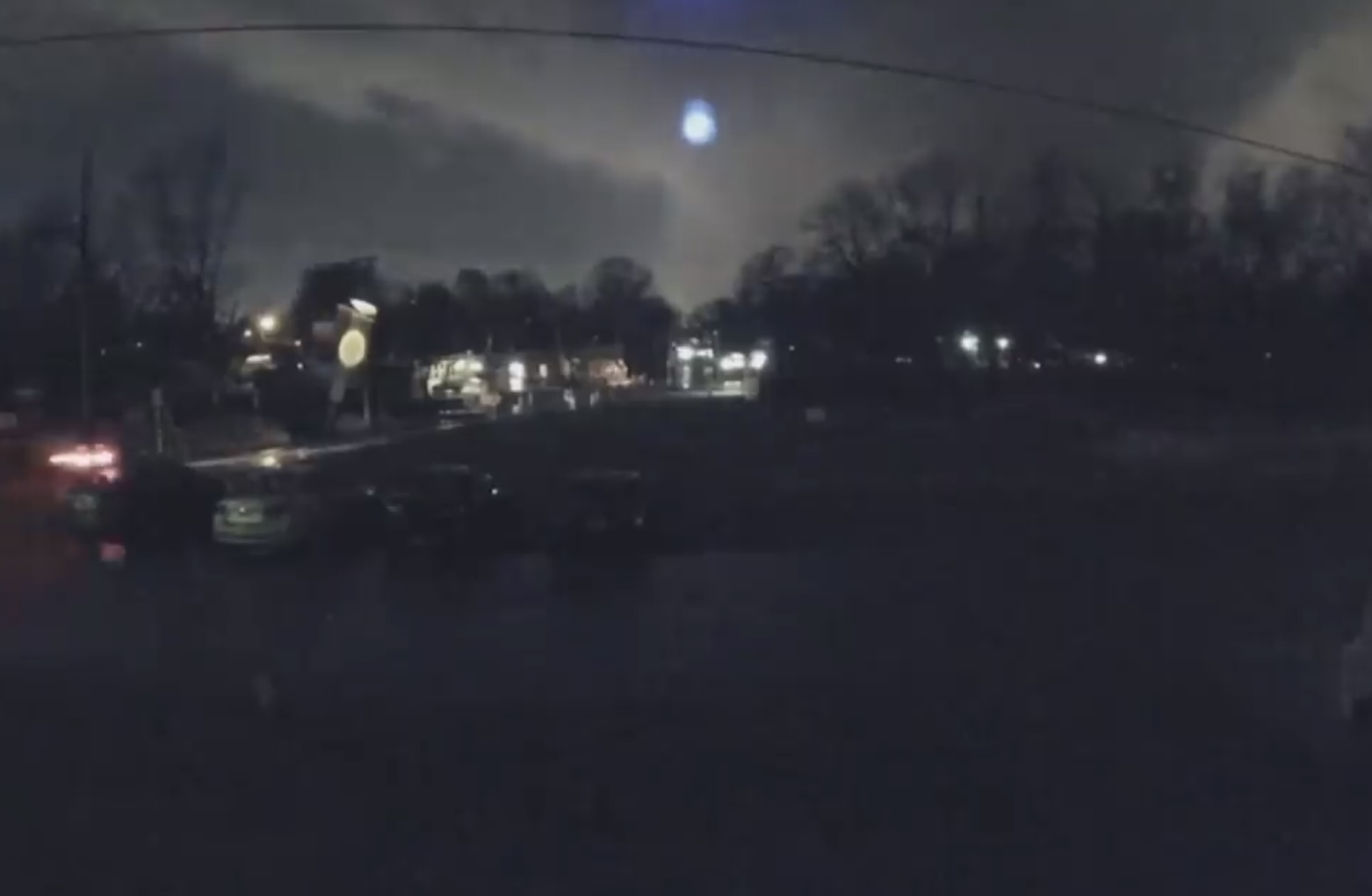
- Clockwise from top: A deadly EF4 tornado as it tore through Cookeville, Tennessee on March 3; An EF3 tornado tracking through Nashville, Tennessee on March 3; An EF3 tornado shortly after formation in Jonesboro, Arkansas on March 28.
- Timespan: January 4 – March 31
- Maximum rated tornado: EF4 tornado: Cookeville, Tennessee on March 3
- Tornadoes: 214
- Fatalities: 33
- Injuries: 367

This page documents all tornadoes confirmed by various weather forecast offices of the National Weather Service in the United States during January, February, and March 2020. Based on the 1991–2010 average, 35 tornadoes touch down in January, 29 touch down in February and 80 touch down in March. These tornadoes are commonly focused across the Southern United States due to their proximity to the unstable airmass and warm waters of the Gulf of Mexico, as well as California in association with winter storms.

The first three months of the year were very active and deadly with 213 tornadoes, 33 fatalities, and dozens of injuries. January featured an unusually large and destructive outbreak during the middle of month that produced 80 of the 88 tornadoes that touched down that month, which was significantly above average. Another sizeable outbreak occurred at the beginning of February and although there was no activity past February 13, the month finished well above average 42 tornadoes. March featured numerous small, but destructive outbreaks, including a very deadly one at the beginning of the month. The final tally for the month was a near average 84 tornadoes.

== United States yearly total ==
Confirmed tornadoes by Enhanced Fujita rating
EFU	EF0	EF1	EF2	EF3	EF4	EF5	Total
109	443	421	89	18	6	0	1,086

== January ==
Confirmed tornadoes by Enhanced Fujita rating
EFU	EF0	EF1	EF2	EF3	EF4	EF5	Total
2	31	42	13	0	0	0	88

=== January 4 event ===
List of confirmed tornadoes – Saturday, January 4, 2020 (Note: All dates are based on the local time zone where the tornado touched down; however, all times are in Coordinated Universal Time for consistency.)
EF#	Location	County / Parish	State	Start Coord.	Time (UTC)	Path length	Max width
EF0	Okahumpka	Lake	FL	28.7399°N 81.9234°W	15:29–15:31	2.38 mi (3.83 km)	175 yd (160 m)
EF0	The tornado followed a discontinuous path. Three to five mobile homes suffered significant roof damage. A large oak tree was toppled and numerous large branches on weak or old trees were downed. One person suffered minor injuries.						
EF1	DeLand	Volusia	FL	29.0023°N 81.3514°W	16:26–16:30	4.39 mi (7.07 km)	265 yd (242 m)
EF1	Two homes and a Veterans of Foreign Wars building suffered significant roof damage. Ten other structures suffered minor to moderate damage. Eight to ten power poles were snapped at the base. Several large trees were toppled and numerous large tree limbs were broken. There was also structural damage at a park and baseball stadium.						

=== January 10 event ===
List of confirmed tornadoes – Friday, January 10, 2020
EF#	Location	County / Parish	State	Start Coord.	Time (UTC)	Path length	Max width	Summary
EF0	Prague	Lincoln	OK	35.4864°N 96.6952°W	16:34–16:37	1.3 mi (2.1 km)	10 yd (9.1 m)	A weak tornado damaged a few homes and destroyed a few sheds or outbuildings in Prague.
EFU	SE of Murphy	Mayes	OK	36.0991°N 95.1771°W	17:55–17:56	1 mi (1.6 km)	50 yd (46 m)	Multiple storm chasers observed a tornado, but the area where it occurred was inaccessible by road, so no damage is known to have occurred.
EF1	WNW of Fair Play	Cedar, Polk	MO	37.6057°N 93.6194°W	20:27–20:41	8.7 mi (14.0 km)	50 yd (46 m)	A manufactured home and several outbuildings were destroyed by this high-end EF1 tornado. Several homes sustained damage, and several trees were snapped or uprooted.
EF0	WNW of Boyd	Wise	TX	33.0971°N 97.6375°W	20:46–20:47	0.4 mi (0.64 km)	75 yd (69 m)	A barn was destroyed, with debris scattered 0.25 mi (0.40 km) downstream. A nearby gas station was damaged, along with some tree limbs.
EF1	WNW of Keys	Cherokee	OK	35.7796°N 95.0229°W	20:49–20:57	5.8 mi (9.3 km)	250 yd (230 m)	The roofs of a house and two mobile homes were damaged. A number of trees were uprooted, and some outbuildings were damaged as well.
EF1	E of Cross Timbers	Hickory	MO	38.0057°N 93.1863°W	21:20–21:23	1.57 mi (2.53 km)	100 yd (91 m)	An outbuilding was destroyed, numerous trees were snapped or uprooted, and two homes sustained minor roof damage.
EF1	NE of Godley	Johnson	TX	32.4886°N 97.4673°W	23:41–23:47	1.05 mi (1.69 km)	250 yd (230 m)	The roofs and awnings of several homes and buildings were damaged. A barn was flipped and blown into the side of a house. A large horse trailer was moved, an 18-wheeler trailer was overturned, and a small storage shed was damaged. Four power poles were leaned over as well.
EF1	E of Springfield to Strafford	Greene	MO	37.2091°N 93.2016°W	23:42–23:53	6.98 mi (11.23 km)	75 yd (69 m)	An automobile service building lost overhead doors and sustained roof damage. Several homes suffered significant roof damage and damage to gutters and garage doors. Two box trucks were overturned, and numerous trees were snapped and uprooted. A large metal building sustained damage to its overhead doors.
EF0	Cooper	Delta	TX	33.3727°N 95.7016°W	00:15–00:17	0.45 mi (0.72 km)	150 yd (140 m)	A brief tornado destroyed a small outbuilding and tore the roof and part of a cinder block wall from a small commercial building. A large sheet metal building was seriously damaged and an apartment complex in town suffered siding damage. Other structures and some trees suffered minor damage.
EF0	SE of Enloe	Delta	TX	33.4254°N 95.6532°W	00:22–00:23	0.14 mi (0.23 km)	100 yd (91 m)	Another brief tornado was spawned by the same supercell as the Cooper tornado. A couple of small outbuildings were destroyed with debris scattered a few hundred yards downwind in a subtle cyclonic pattern.
EF0	Northern Irving	Dallas	TX	32.9067°N 96.9645°W	00:42–00:44	1.11 mi (1.79 km)	175 yd (160 m)	A grocery store and other structures sustained roof damage. The exterior wall of a hotel, the roofs and windows of two restaurants, trees, light poles, and commercial signs were damaged.
EF2	NE of Cove Lake to ENE of Tokalon	Logan	AR	35.2151°N 93.5999°W	01:44–02:02	13.6 mi (21.9 km)	250 yd (230 m)	One mobile home and a barn were destroyed, and another mobile home was damaged. Homes lost large sections of their roofs but most of their walls remained. Other outbuildings and chicken houses were damaged or destroyed. Trees and power lines were knocked down along the path.
EF1	E of Cecil	Franklin	AR	35.4262°N 93.8928°W	01:45–01:49	3.9 mi (6.3 km)	400 yd (370 m)	Several outbuildings were destroyed, the roof of a home was damaged, numerous trees were snapped or uprooted, and power poles were toppled.
EF1	WSW of Caldwell	Burleson	TX	30.4847°N 96.8042°W	03:34–03:35	0.11 mi (0.18 km)	100 yd (91 m)	A shed was destroyed and a trailer was thrown 40 yards (37 m) to the south while debris was blown to the northeast. Numerous trees were snapped.
EF1	NW of Rusk	Cherokee	TX	31.8177°N 95.1751°W	05:21–05:22	0.8 mi (1.3 km)	75 yd (69 m)	A shed was destroyed and the roofs of five homes were damaged. Trees were uprooted.
EF1	WSW of Nacogdoches	Nacogdoches	TX	31.5832°N 94.7558°W	05:33–05:36	2.13 mi (3.43 km)	160 yd (150 m)	1 death – Trees were knocked down and large tree branches were broken. One tree fell into a mobile home, killing one person and injuring another. Several other homes suffered minor damage.
EF1	N of Cushing	Rusk	TX	31.8968°N 94.8427°W	05:43–05:50	4.24 mi (6.82 km)	500 yd (460 m)	Several farm outbuildings were tossed and demolished, and two houses sustained roof damage. Numerous trees were snapped and uprooted.
EF1	NE of Pollok	Angelina	TX	31.4619°N 94.8401°W	05:53–05:54	0.31 mi (0.50 km)	150 yd (140 m)	A double wide mobile home was lifted up and shifted off its foundation, and a trailer was flipped. Trees and tree limbs were snapped in a convergent pattern.

=== January 11 event ===
List of confirmed tornadoes – Saturday, January 11, 2020
EF#	Location	County / Parish	State	Start Coord.	Time (UTC)	Path length	Max width	Summary
EF1	ENE of Tatum	Panola	TX	32.3289°N 94.4356°W	06:18–06:19	0.52 mi (0.84 km)	150 yd (140 m)	This high-end EF1 tornado snapped or uprooted a few hundred pine trees on a hillside. It then caused sporadic tree damage before crossing FM 959, causing mainly roof damage to several residences and outbuildings before dissipating.
EF0	S of Karnack	Harrison	TX	32.6402°N 94.2112°W	06:30–06:33	3 mi (4.8 km)	100 yd (91 m)	This high-end EF0 tornado snapped small and large tree branches. The tornado also tore the wooden front porch and gutters off of a home as it crossed SH 43. It then crossed County Road 2600 before lifting near FM 134 before entering the Longhorn Army Ammunition Plant.
EF1	Center	Shelby	TX	31.773°N 94.2021°W	06:39–06:49	6.07 mi (9.77 km)	400 yd (370 m)	Numerous trees were snapped or uprooted in town, many of which inflicted damage to homes upon falling. One fallen pine tree resulted in a minor injury when it significantly damaged the roof of a home. East of town, a number of chicken houses had some roof paneling removed, including a few where most paneling was ripped off.
EF1	NE of Patton	Bollinger	MO	37.52°N 89.99°W	06:52–06:53	0.2 mi (0.32 km)	45 yd (41 m)	A brief tornado touched down along Route 72, destroying the workshop area of a house and ripping the roof off of a nearby barn. Debris was thrown as much as 100 yards (91 m) away. A few trees were also uprooted.
EF1	E of Seaton	Lonoke	AR	34.6013°N 91.8024°W	06:58–06:59	0.43 mi (0.69 km)	130 yd (120 m)	The roof of a house was damaged, a storage shed was lifted about 100 feet (30 m) into the air, thrown into trees, and completely destroyed, part of a grain bin was blown in, and part of a barn roof was peeled back by this damaging tornado. Several power poles were snapped as well.
EF2	Sligo to Sibley to SE of Athens	Bossier, Webster, Claiborne	LA	32.4571°N 93.5875°W	07:24–08:05	42.06 mi (67.69 km)	300 yd (270 m)	3 deaths – See section on this tornado.
EF2	ESE of Jackson to Egypt Mills	Cape Girardeau	MO	37.35°N 89.6118°W	07:42–07:55	9.7 mi (15.6 km)	300 yd (270 m)	This strong tornado touched down and quickly reached its peak intensity as it crossed US 61/BL I-55/Route 34. One business was destroyed, and several others suffered broken windows or roof damage. A tire store had its roof destroyed with debris thrown hundreds of yards, and its back exterior wall was blown out. Debris was tossed onto nearby I-55, which had to be closed for a short time so that it could be cleaned up. East of the Interstate, several barns or outbuildings were damaged or destroyed, and numerous trees were snapped and uprooted in the Egypt Mills area. The path may have extended past Route 177 to Bainbridge and the Mississippi River, but flooding prevented additional surveys.
EF1	Ware	Union	IL	37.446°N 89.4021°W	08:02–08:03	0.86 mi (1.38 km)	50 yd (46 m)	This tornado, which came from the same storm that produced the Jackson, Missouri EF2 tornado, touched down and crossed IL 3/IL 146 as it moved directly through Ware. Considerable damage occurred as a large open storage building was overturned and destroyed, and metal roofing was ripped from a farm outbuilding. Shingles were removed from the roof of a hunting club, the roof was lifted slightly off a house, and the roof of a metal storage building was tossed and overturned. Hundreds of decoy ducks were tossed and broken, and numerous trees were snapped or uprooted in town.
EF1	SE of Spearsville	Union	LA	32.8654°N 92.5633°W	08:19–08:23	3.05 mi (4.91 km)	250 yd (230 m)	This tornado developed within a larger area of damaging winds, snapping trees and completely tearing the metal roofs off of two chicken houses, tossing them hundreds of feet while peeling the tin roof off another chicken house. Several trees at this location snapped and uprooted several hardwood and softwood trees. Metal roofing was ripped off more chicken houses and tossed into fields before the tornado dissipated.
EF1	WNW of North Crossett	Ashley	AR	33.1768°N 92.0576°W	08:45–08:52	4.45 mi (7.16 km)	650 yd (590 m)	Several outbuildings were damaged, several homes lost their shingles while two others suffered more extensive roof damage, and numerous trees were snapped or uprooted. Several homes were impacted by fallen trees, a church sustained moderate roof damage, and several power lines and poles were downed.
EF1	NNW of Hamburg	Ashley	AR	33.2576°N 91.9609°W	08:54–09:04	9.11 mi (14.66 km)	800 yd (730 m)	Dozens of trees were snapped or uprooted, and several were downed onto two mobile homes. A church sustained roof damage, and its covered walkway was blown away. A large front covering to another church was destroyed, with its roof suffering damage as well. Several homes sustained roof damage; tin and insulation were thrown. One person was indirectly injured.
EF1	N of North Crossett to SSE of Hamburg	Ashley	AR	33.1761°N 91.9441°W	08:55–09:08	10.31 mi (16.59 km)	800 yd (730 m)	A large shed was destroyed, with fragments of its roof tossed across the road. A couple of homes sustained roof damage. A large hangar at an airport suffered roof damage and had panels blown out of its back wall. Numerous trees were snapped or uprooted. Power poles and lines were toppled.
EF2	NE of Hamburg to Montrose to W of Cosgrove	Ashley, Chicot	AR	33.2638°N 91.7598°W	09:07–09:28	20.51 mi (33.01 km)	1,000 yd (910 m)	This large, strong tornado first touched down northeast of the town of Hamburg in Ashley County. Moving east-northeastward and quickly intensifying to high-end EF1 strength, the tornado snapped or uprooted many trees, downed five power poles and power lines, and threw a mobile home 15–20 yd (14–18 m). The tornado then turned eastward, rolling and destroying another mobile home, heavily damaging a tractor shed, and downing more power poles and power lines. The tornado then began to move near and along US 82 as it turned back to the east-northeast, damaging a metal building system, downing more power poles and power lines, which included the top of one wooden high-tension segment, and snapping or uprooting hundreds of trees. West of Montrose, three segments of the wooden high-tension poles and lines were taken down at low-end EF2 intensity; some homes also suffered roof damage. Just west of Montrose, the tornado again reached low-end EF2 strength as it downed four more wooden high-tension segments and crossed US 165. Although the strongest part of the tornado passed to the north of Montrose, it still damaged numerous trees in the town, along with roofs of houses, with more trees falling on houses. Just before crossing into Chicot County, the tornado downed a metal high-tension pole segment at high-end EF2 intensity. It steadily weakened after crossing the county line, damaging an outbuilding, downing five more power poles, and uprooting and snapping more trees before dissipating.
EF0	Jerome	Drew	AR	33.3949°N 91.4714°W	09:24–09:25	0.81 mi (1.30 km)	150 yd (140 m)	This tornado caused major damage to a series of large industrial grain and feed silos in Jerome. One silo, bolted into concrete in several places, was ripped out of the ground. The roof of another large silo was tossed 0.5 mi (0.80 km) and broken into pieces. Electrical poles were snapped, and trees were snapped or uprooted.
EF2	W of Lake Village, AR to W of Metcalfe, MS	Chicot (AR), Washington (MS)	AR, MS	33.3349°N 91.3129°W	09:33–09:53	17.66 mi (28.42 km)	850 yd (780 m)	This strong tornado touched down west of Lake Village on the southeast side of the Lake Village Municipal Airport and moved northeastward, rolling and largely destroying a manufactured home, and downing a tree onto a home, injuring one person. The tornado then crossed US 65/US 278/AR 144/Great River Road, downing 8 to 10 wooden electrical poles. A golf country club suffered damage, and more trees were damaged as the tornado moved along AR 144 and Lake Chicot. A trailer was blown across a street, and five more wooden power poles were snapped as well. The tornado then crossed the Mississippi River while moving over the state line three times. Upon crossing Ferguson Lake, the tornado reached its peak strength and blew the second floor off a lake house. The tornado then rapidly weakened, downing power poles, and damaging more trees before dissipating as it crossed MS 1 (Great River Road).
EF1	Chanticleer	Chicot	AR	33.3027°N 91.284°W	09:36–9:37	0.17 mi (0.27 km)	15 yd (14 m)	The center of a metal building collapsed, and a shed was completely destroyed. Some windows were blown out, and portions of tin roofing were peeled off a metal warehouse building. A wooden power pole was snapped as well.
EF2	ESE of Bolivar to Renova (Note: The NCEI map starting point is misaligned from where the tornado is said to have started.)	Bolivar	AR, MS	33.6658°N 91.0602°W	09:48–10:11	23.38 mi (37.63 km)	1,800 yd (1,600 m)	This very large tornado first touched down just outside of Bolivar and moved northeastward just east of the Arkansas-Mississippi border. It first downed trees atop a levee west of Benoit before moving across farmland at EF2 intensity, snapping trees and power poles, and destroying a farm garage, which was tossed 200 yd (180 m), while its concrete anchoring was tossed 100 yd (91 m). The tornado then continued east-northeastward at EF1 strength and crossed MS 1 (Great River Road), damaging an outbuilding, snapping and uprooting trees, snapping numerous power poles, and tossing and destroying a grain silo. The tornado continued to snap trees and power poles as it moved through the Dahomey National Wildlife Refuge and passed south of Pace. The tornado then reached EF2 intensity again as it passed between Pace and Cleveland. It first crossed MS 8, heavily damaging multiple outbuildings, inflicting roof damage to a home, and snapping or damaging up to 100 power poles. Continuing east-northeastward, the tornado snapped several concrete and wooden power poles, snapped or uprooted trees, and inflicted roof damage to well-built homes. It then destroyed several mobile homes, injuring four people. The tornado then passed through Renova as it crossed US 61. More steel and wooden power poles were snapped, multiple outbuildings were damaged or destroyed, and mobile homes and homes suffered roof damage. Shortly after that, the tornado rapidly weakened and dissipated short of the Bolivar-Sunflower county line.
EF1	W of Duncan	Bolivar	MS	34.0818°N 90.8124°W	10:02–10:05	4.18 mi (6.73 km)	880 yd (800 m)	Several homes sustained roof damage, three power poles were downed, and a pivot was knocked over. Trees were snapped and uprooted along the path.
EF1	ESE of Winstonville	Bolivar	MS	33.8988°N 90.7434°W	10:07–10:10	2.55 mi (4.10 km)	270 yd (250 m)	A high-end EF1 tornado downed trees and power lines.
EF2	Rome	Sunflower	MS	33.9183°N 90.5201°W	10:18–10:25	5.54 mi (8.92 km)	1,700 yd (1,600 m)	Several homes and businesses in Rome, including a post office, were destroyed. Minor damage occurred on the grounds of a state penitentiary, and several wooden power poles were snapped.
EF2	N of Drew	Sunflower	MS	33.8224°N 90.5682°W	10:19–10:26	5.43 mi (8.74 km)	850 yd (780 m)	A mobile home was completely destroyed, with its undercarriage and contents thrown downwind. Trees and power lines were knocked down as well.
EF0	NW of Sumner	Tallahatchie	MS	33.9798°N 90.4099°W	10:26–10:28	2.24 mi (3.60 km)	100 yd (91 m)	A grain bin, a barn, and trees were damaged, and 30 train cars were derailed.
EF1	N of Troy	Obion	TN	36.3671°N 89.1916°W	10:38–10:40	1.86 mi (2.99 km)	150 yd (140 m)	Several barns and outbuildings were severely damaged or destroyed. Trees and the roofs of homes were damaged.
EF1	SE of Hernando	Tate, DeSoto	MS	34.6979°N 90.1309°W	10:42–10:52	11.27 mi (18.14 km)	200 yd (180 m)	A tornado caused damage to trees, sheds, roofs, residences, and storage buildings.
EF1	SSE of Bobo to W of Bateman	Quitman, Panola	MS	34.26°N 90.175°W	10:45–10:51	5.67 mi (9.12 km)	150 yd (140 m)	Numerous homes and an outbuilding were damaged. Two mobile homes suffered significant roof damage.
EF2	NE of Hernando to S of Olive Branch	DeSoto	MS	34.8576°N 89.9206°W	10:53–11:01	8.21 mi (13.21 km)	300 yd (270 m)	A strong tornado damaged trees and signs. A stable and a large metal building were heavily damaged. Numerous homes were damaged, some severely.
EF0	E of Como	Panola, Tate	MS	34.5045°N 89.8584°W	11:04–11:12	7.25 mi (11.67 km)	150 yd (140 m)	A few barns suffered significant damage. Numerous trees were damaged.
EF1	Stubblefield	Graves	KY	36.61°N 88.7°W	11:17–11:19	1.98 mi (3.19 km)	230 yd (210 m)	Three buildings at a chicken farm were substantially damaged, while a fourth suffered moderate damage, and the remaining two sustained minor impacts. Metal roofing was tossed into the tops of trees at least 50–60 ft (15–18 m) in height. A house and some trees were damaged as well. Damage was estimated to be nearly 2 million dollars.
EF0	S of Marianna	Marshall	MS	34.6550°N 89.6108°W	11:21–11:28	5.85 mi (9.41 km)	70 yd (64 m)	Trees and a couple of manufactured homes were damaged.
EF0	SE of Williston	Fayette	TN	35.1294°N 89.3431°W	11:36–11:38	1.98 mi (3.19 km)	90 yd (82 m)	Trees were uprooted, and homes sustained minor damage. A mobile home sustained minor damage.
EF1	W of Benton	Marshall	KY	36.85°N 88.38°W	11:42–11:45	2.34 mi (3.77 km)	25 yd (23 m)	The roof was blown off a barn, and numerous trees were uprooted and snapped.
EF0	Hillside	Weakley	TN	36.2574°N 88.8041°W	11:58-11:59	0.08 mi (0.13 km)	75 yd (69 m)	Outbuildings and sheds were destroyed. Multiple trees were downed.
EF2	N of Krotz Springs	St. Landry	LA	30.5922°N 91.7641°W	12:04–12:06	1.2 mi (1.9 km)	125 yd (114 m)	The roofs, awnings, and patios of several homes were damaged. A mobile home was flipped over and destroyed, with debris displaced over 0.5 mi (0.80 km). Another mobile home was rolled over, resulting in four injuries, while two more were knocked off their pilings and had their windows broken. Farm equipment was damaged by flying debris, and trees were snapped or downed.
EF1	SW of Baldwyn to Wheeler	Lee, Prentiss	MS	34.4938°N 88.7007°W	12:45–12:52	7.23 mi (11.64 km)	100 yd (91 m)	Several commercial buildings were damaged. Trees were downed and uprooted, and a few trees fell on homes in town. The roof of a high school and an industrial building were damaged.
EF1	SE of Fenton	Trigg	KY	36.72°N 88.07°W	12:50–12:56	4.48 mi (7.21 km)	75 yd (69 m)	Dozens of trees were snapped and uprooted, and a microburst downed and uprooted even more trees across a lake.
EF1	S of Bonneville to N of Altitude	Prentiss	MS	34.5963°N 88.5353°W	12:56–13:03	8.22 mi (13.23 km)	150 yd (140 m)	A large barn, four mobile homes, a residence, and several buildings at a lumber processing facility were damaged.
EF0	NE of Canton	Trigg	KY	36.8321°N 87.932°W	13:00–13:06	4.18 mi (6.73 km)	50 yd (46 m)	Several homes suffered minor roof damage while one sustained moderate damage. A metal building had its garage door blown in, and a large tree branch fell on a vehicle. A carport was shifted off its supports, and several trees were snapped or uprooted along the path.
EF1	Hopson to Pennyrile Forest State Resort Park	Caldwell, Christian	KY	36.9862°N 87.8431°W	13:05–13:19	10.02 mi (16.13 km)	250 yd (230 m)	At least a half dozen barns or outbuildings were damaged or destroyed. Four wooden high-tension power poles were toppled, and dozens of trees were snapped or uprooted.
EF1	NE of Altitude to S of Burnsville	Prentiss, Tishomingo	MS	34.7276°N 88.3934°W	13:08–13:14	5.71 mi (9.19 km)	120 yd (110 m)	Several homes and storage buildings, in addition to trees, were damaged.
EF1	Friendship to Pennyrile Forest State Resort Park	Caldwell, Christian	KY	37.05°N 87.78°W	13:12–13:20	7.49 mi (12.05 km)	175 yd (160 m)	One barn was destroyed, and another one was damaged. One of the barns had its roof tossed across a road, and a house lost some siding. Hundreds of trees were snapped or uprooted as well.
EF0	SE of Burnsville	Tishomingo	MS	34.8160°N 88.2900°W	13:17–13:18	0.72 mi (1.16 km)	80 yd (73 m)	A residence, trees, and power poles suffered minor damage.
EF1	N of Hawkins	Christian	KY	37.0565°N 87.6518°W	13:19–13:23	2.98 mi (4.80 km)	200 yd (180 m)	A few barns were damaged or blown down, and a couple of houses suffered shingle and fascia loss. Dozens of trees were snapped or uprooted as well.
EF1	ESE of Howel to NNW of Pembroke	Christian	KY	36.6912°N 87.5107°W	13:34–13:44	10.94 mi (17.61 km)	100 yd (91 m)	Several barns were damaged or destroyed, including one that had its roof tossed several hundred yards into trees. Power lines were downed, 13 empty rail cars were tipped over, and a couple of homes suffered minor damage.
EF1	SE of Hopkinsville	Christian	KY	36.8143°N 87.4434°W	13:40–13:43	2.61 mi (4.20 km)	50 yd (46 m)	Several trees were snapped, and a barn suffered partial damage to its roof.
EF0	Forest	Scott	MS	32.3707°N 89.4785°W	15:33–15:37	2.69 mi (4.33 km)	250 yd (230 m)	A weak tornado caused minor roof damage to a small barn, and snapped numerous hardwood and softwood tree limbs in the town of Forest.
EF2	NNE of Sapps to S of Beards Mill	Pickens	AL	33.2379°N 88.1545°W	17:11–17:20	6.33 mi (10.19 km)	1,056 yd (966 m)	3 deaths – This large, high-end EF2 tornado caused varying degrees of roof and structural damage to at least 22 homes to the west of Carrollton. Six site-built homes and four manufactured homes, three of which were anchored, were destroyed. The four manufactured homes were thrown considerable distances away, and three fatalities occurred in two of them. Two barns were heavily damaged, and many trees were downed along the path. Seven people were injured.
EF0	Holly Pond	Cullman	AL	34.1749°N 86.6197°W	19:03–19:08	0.21 mi (0.34 km)	80 yd (73 m)	A restaurant in Holly Pond sustained roof damage and had its siding wrapped around a cell phone tower, while a high school sustained minimal roof and awning damage. Trees were damaged as well.
EF1	Joppa to SW of Hog Jaw	Cullman, Marshall	AL	34.3°N 86.5571°W	19:13–19:15	1.84 mi (2.96 km)	60 yd (55 m)	This tornado touched down in Joppa, where trees were downed, some of which landed on homes. The tornado tracked northeastward along SR 69, where numerous additional trees were snapped and uprooted, some of which also landed on buildings and caused minor structural damage. An outbuilding lost its roof as well.
EF2	Union Grove	Marshall	AL	34.3974°N 86.4466°W	19:19–19:24	0.22 mi (0.35 km)	150 yd (140 m)	This strong tornado destroyed ten classrooms, the cafeteria, and the gymnasium at Brindlee Mountain Primary School. Numerous beams in the roof of the gym were twisted and bent, and large bolts used to attach the gym to the foundation were ripped from the structure. A set of bleachers was hurled over 150 yd (140 m) from one side of the school to the other. Several dumpsters were displaced, and three or four power poles were snapped, the latter of which led to additional damage to the school's roof and awning. Several trees were snapped or uprooted. The school was closed permanently and donated to the city of Union Grove.
EF0	N of Hiram to S of Lost Mountain	Paulding, Cobb	GA	33.9108°N 84.7582°W	21:52–21:56	3.86 mi (6.21 km)	400 yd (370 m)	Dozens of trees were snapped or uprooted, and one tree fell on a home.
EF1	NW of Suches	Fannin	GA	34.7415°N 84.1414°W	22:24–22:27	3.05 mi (4.91 km)	450 yd (410 m)	Hundreds of trees were downed, damaging at least four homes. A 40 ft (12 m) steel radio tower was toppled as well. (Note: The NCEI lists the event as EF0, but the report summary says the tornado was rated EF1.)
EF1	SSE of Woodbury	Upson	GA	32.9134°N 84.5255°W	22:48–22:49	0.34 mi (0.55 km)	100 yd (91 m)	A river home was knocked off its stilts and destroyed, and another home was damaged, both by falling trees. A camper was blown over, and a boat was blown into a tree. About 100 trees and several power poles were snapped or blown over as well.
EF1	SE of Bakerhill	Barbour	AL	31.7633°N 85.3100°W	22:33–22:41	5.8 mi (9.3 km)	275 yd (251 m)	A low-end EF1 tornado tore vinyl siding off the right side of a brick home, destroyed an outbuilding, and snapped or downed numerous trees.
EF0	NewTazewell to NE of Tazewell	Claiborne	TN	36.4452°N 83.6048°W	22:55–22:58	3.3 mi (5.3 km)	30 yd (27 m)	Half the roof of a barn was blown off, a house had many shingles and two window shutters blown off, and a second house sustained front porch damage. Numerous trees were snapped or uprooted, one of which fell onto and damaged a third home.
EF0	SW of Townville	Anderson	SC	34.55°N 82.914°W	01:04–01:05	0.44 mi (0.71 km)	30 yd (27 m)	A weak anticyclonic tornado embedded within a larger area of damaging straight-line winds, downed trees, and removed metal sheeting from an outbuilding.
EF0	NE of Townville	Anderson	SC	34.5833°N 82.8697°W	01:06–01:07	0.27 mi (0.43 km)	50 yd (46 m)	A second anticyclonic tornado formed after the previous one dissipated. Trees were uprooted or snapped.
EF0	S of Piedmont	Anderson	SC	34.68°N 82.472°W	01:40–01:42	0.66 mi (1.06 km)	160 yd (150 m)	A carport was dislodged and destroyed, and trees were snapped or uprooted.
EF0	W of Greenwood	Abbeville, Greenwood	SC	34.182°N 82.259°W	01:40–01:44	2.44 mi (3.93 km)	50 yd (46 m)	Part of the roof of a barn was torn off, and its metal door was blown inward. Several large pine trees were uprooted or snapped as well.
EF0	S of Cokesbury	Greenwood	SC	34.239°N 82.208°W	01:45–01:46	0.53 mi (0.85 km)	30 yd (27 m)	Large tree limbs were broken off several trees. At least two other trees were uprooted. One home suffered minor roof damage.
EF0	Troy	Miami	OH	40.0305°N 84.2271°W	03:11–03:13	3.1 mi (5.0 km)	350 yd (320 m)	A number of structures suffered minor and intermittent roof damage, although a couple of older businesses in the downtown area did lose most or all of their roofs. Falling bricks severely damaged several vehicles in downtown Troy, and trees were also damaged.
EF0	Southern Fletcher	Miami	OH	40.1060°N 84.1758°W	03:15–03:21	6.34 mi (10.20 km)	175 yd (160 m)	Trees were broken, the roofs of barns and outbuildings were damaged, and electrical poles were snapped. Residences in the southern part of town sustained shingle and soffit damage, and some homes were damaged by fallen trees.
EF2	SSE of Kershaw	Kershaw	SC	34.4293°N 80.5303°W	03:33–03:35	0.55 mi (0.89 km)	150 yd (140 m)	This brief, but strong tornado impacted North Central High School, partially collapsing concrete stadium bleachers, a press box, and the exterior wall of the western side of the structure. All of the HVAC units were tossed off the roof, and most of the roof was ripped off the main office and an older auditorium. A total of 4 school buses were moved while 25–30 more suffered broken windows and other damage. A small building beyond the school's parking lot was destroyed. Numerous trees were snapped. Strong inflow into the tornado collapsed two large light stands and displaced a Conex shipping container about 50 yd (46 m).

=== January 13 event ===
List of confirmed tornadoes – Monday, January 13, 2020
EF#	Location	County / Parish	State	Start Coord.	Time (UTC)	Path length	Max width
EF0	Loris	Horry	SC	34.0423°N 78.8659°W	17:45–17:50	1.21 mi (1.95 km)	45 yd (41 m)
EF0	Several cars in a school parking lot in Loris were tossed, and windows were blown out in dozens of others. In all, 75 cars were damaged. A mobile trailer was flipped, the metal roof was torn from a storage barn, several pine trees were snapped, and tree limbs were broken. No tornado warning was issued.						
EF0	SW of Williamson	Pike	GA	33.1469°N 84.3921°W	04:51–04:53	1.46 mi (2.35 km)	100 yd (91 m)
EF0	One home suffered very minor roof damage. Several large trees were intermittently snapped or uprooted.						

=== January 14 event ===
List of confirmed tornadoes – Tuesday, January 14, 2020
EF#	Location	County / Parish	State	Start Coord.	Time (UTC)	Path length	Max width
EF0	E of Griffin	Spalding	GA	33.2509°N 84.1929°W	05:20-05:21	0.28 mi (0.45 km)	50 yd (46 m)
EF0	A large portion of the roof and carport of an outdoor workshop were blown off and a house suffered minor roof damage. Several trees were uprooted or snapped.						

=== January 21 event ===
List of confirmed tornadoes – Tuesday, January 21, 2020
EF#	Location	County / Parish	State	Start Coord.	Time (UTC)	Path length	Max width
EF0	N of Manzanita	Tillamook	OR	45.74°N 123.94°W	19:15	0.25 mi (0.40 km)	100 yd (91 m)
EF0	One tree was snapped and a second was downed. One home suffered broken windows from flying debris, and a fence was toppled. The metal roof of a property was dislodged on one side, and lawn furniture was twisted and broken.						

=== January 28 event ===
List of confirmed tornadoes – Tuesday, January 28, 2020
EF#	Location	County / Parish	State	Start Coord.	Time (UTC)	Path length	Max width
EF0	W of Ross	McLennan	TX	31.7094°N 97.1457°W	21:15–21:17	1.74 mi (2.80 km)	10 yd (9.1 m)
EF0	A landspout damaged two metal roofs and flipped a boat.						

=== January 31 event ===
List of confirmed tornadoes – Friday, January 31, 2020
EF#	Location	County / Parish	State	Start Coord.	Time (UTC)	Path length	Max width
EFU	SSE of Everglades Wilderness Waterway	Monroe	FL	25.464°N 81.123°W	03:35–03:43	4.68 mi (7.53 km)	50 yd (46 m)
EFU	Doppler radar detected a strong circulation and a tornado debris signature associated with a squall line. No damage that could be identified was found, but radar data and environmental conditions suggest peak wind speeds of 80 miles per hour (130 km/h), consistent with a high-end EF0 tornado						

== February ==
Confirmed tornadoes by Enhanced Fujita rating
EFU	EF0	EF1	EF2	EF3	EF4	EF5	Total
0	10	25	7	0	0	0	42

=== February 5 event ===
List of confirmed tornadoes – Wednesday, February 5, 2020
EF#	Location	County / Parish	State	Start Coord.	Time (UTC)	Path length	Max width	Summary
EF1	NNE of Magee	Simpson	MS	31.9546°N 89.752°W	20:57–21:07	6.17 mi (9.93 km)	150 yd (140 m)	Two houses sustained moderate roof damage, and another house had a window blown out and a carport destroyed. A car and an RV were rolled and destroyed, and a shed lost most of its tin roof. A mobile home was pushed off its blocks and its carport was blown away. Trees were uprooted and snapped along the path.
EF2	Shongelo	Smith	MS	32.0978°N 89.5263°W	21:20–21:24	2.64 mi (4.25 km)	440 yd (400 m)	A low-end EF2 tornado moved through a forest, snapping or uprooting a substantial number of trees.
EF1	S of Oil City to NE of Little Yazoo	Yazoo	MS	32.6797°N 90.4403°W	21:28–21:40	8.12 mi (13.07 km)	800 yd (730 m)	A large tornado destroyed a shed, inflicted minor shingle damage to a home sustained, and snapped or uprooted numerous trees.
EF2	W of Vaughan to ESE of Goodman	Yazoo, Holmes, Attala	MS	32.8169°N 90.0995°W	21:57–22:24	18.71 mi (30.11 km)	900 yd (820 m)	A large, low-end EF2 tornado snapped and uprooted hundreds of trees and downed several power poles and lines. A large metal storage shed was destroyed, a large metal building had some of its walls pulled out, and about a dozen homes suffered some degree of roof damage. A large hay barn was completely destroyed and several other outbuildings were damaged. Four people were injured.
EF1	E of Kosciusko to S of Ethel	Attala	MS	33.0678°N 89.501°W	22:46–22:48	1.66 mi (2.67 km)	300 yd (270 m)	A few dozen trees, three metal sheds, and a mobile home were damaged. Power lines were downed as well.
EF2	E of Ethel to SE of McCool	Attala, Choctaw	MS	33.1175°N 89.3761°W	22:58–23:04	5.89 mi (9.48 km)	800 yd (730 m)	A low-end EF2 tornado downed power lines and snapped or uprooted many large trees. A mobile home and an RV were damaged by fallen trees. A few houses suffered some roof damage, and a few sheds were damaged as well.
EF1	N of Maud	Colbert	AL	34.6617°N 88.1282°W	23:18–23:25	1.32 mi (2.12 km)	60 yd (55 m)	Small sheds and outbuildings sustained roof damage, and the walls of one structure collapsed. Trees were uprooted and snapped along the path.
EF1	SSW of Carthage	Leake	MS	32.6636°N 89.6748°W	23:33–23:48	9.13 mi (14.69 km)	250 yd (230 m)	A chicken house was collapsed, and numerous trees were snapped or uprooted.
EF1	N of Standing Pine	Leake	MS	32.7049°N 89.476°W	23:50–23:57	4.91 mi (7.90 km)	150 yd (140 m)	A mobile home was rolled several yards and destroyed, and a nearby compost shed was also demolished. Another manufactured home sustained some roof damage, and numerous trees were snapped or uprooted.
EF1	Loretto to S of Leoma	Lawrence	TN	35.0723°N 87.4649°W	23:55–00:07	10.05 mi (16.17 km)	300 yd (270 m)	A well-built detached garage was destroyed, a bank sign was blown down, several homes and other structures in town suffered damage, power lines were toppled, and numerous trees were snapped or uprooted.
EF1	Lawrenceburg	Lawrence	TN	35.223°N 87.3984°W	23:56–00:07	10.51 mi (16.91 km)	300 yd (270 m)	This tornado moved directly through Lawrenceburg. Numerous trees were snapped or uprooted, one of which fell on a house. A library in Lawrenceburg had part of its roof torn off. Outbuildings, barns, power lines, and the roofs of homes were damaged. One person was injured.
EF0	NW of Shelbyville	Bedford	TN	35.5498°N 86.5358°W	00:47–00:57	10.36 mi (16.67 km)	50 yd (46 m)	A carport and the roofs of a barn and some other structures were damaged. Numerous trees were snapped or uprooted, and utility poles were downed.
EF0	N of Centertown to S of Green Hill	Warren	TN	35.7421°N 85.916°W	01:23–01:31	6.34 mi (10.20 km)	50 yd (46 m)	A barn was completely destroyed, a house suffered minor damage to its front porch and garage, and several trees were snapped, some of which were downed onto a mobile home.
EF1	E of Shady Grove to S of Sparta	White	TN	35.9001°N 85.5391°W	01:55–01:59	3.86 mi (6.21 km)	200 yd (180 m)	This tornado moved off Gum Springs Mountain to just south of Sparta, removing the roof from a home, damaging a barn and an outbuilding, and downing many trees and numerous power lines.
EF1	NE of Sparta to DeRossett	White	TN	35.9522°N 85.4173°W	02:02–02:09	6.39 mi (10.28 km)	250 yd (230 m)	Several outbuildings and barns, a covered porch, and the roof of a house were destroyed. A mobile home suffered extensive damage, and numerous trees were snapped. This tornado ascended the Cumberland Plateau at Bon Air Mountain.
EF2	S of Bay Springs to Enterprise to ESE of Toomsuba	Jasper, Clarke, Lauderdale	MS	31.9406°N 89.2971°W	04:51–05:57	59.85 mi (96.32 km)	1,320 yd (1,210 m)	A large, strong, and long-tracked tornado snapped or uprooted countless trees and toppled a metal fire tower. The roofs of numerous houses, sheds, outbuildings, trailers, barns, and chicken houses were damaged. A couple of well-built homes lost large portions of their roofs. In the town of Enterprise, trees were downed and a metal storage building was destroyed at EF1 strength, while trees were snapped at EF2 strength farther northeast in Basic. Wooden power poles were snapped and power lines were downed, and a high school suffered minor awning damage.

=== February 6 event ===
List of confirmed tornadoes – Thursday, February 6, 2020
EF#	Location	County / Parish	State	Start Coord.	Time (UTC)	Path length	Max width	Summary
EF2	NNW of Pea Ridge to Helena	Shelby	AL	33.2121°N 86.9694°W	07:57–08:09	9.91 mi (15.95 km)	700 yd (640 m)	Thousands of trees were snapped or uprooted, and some areas suffered total deforestation. Several homes sustained minor roof and siding damage, and the window of one home was shattered.
EF1	SE of Demopolis	Marengo	AL	32.4617°N 87.8012°W	08:13–08:15	1.29 mi (2.08 km)	400 yd (370 m)	1 death – Two manufactured homes were destroyed by this high-end EF1 tornado, resulting in one fatality and one injury. A barn was destroyed, four other houses were damaged, and several trees were snapped or uprooted.
EF0	NE of Adairsville	Bartow, Gordon	GA	34.3951°N 84.8631°W	10:28–10:30	2.24 mi (3.60 km)	200 yd (180 m)	A mobile home lost its entire roof and was slightly moved off its foundation by this high-end EF0 tornado. Several homes sustained roof damaged, and the front deck of one home was lifted and damaged. About a dozen trees were uprooted.
EF1	W of Lawndale to NE of Fallston	Cleveland, Lincoln	NC	35.4174°N 81.5876°W	14:45–14:59	7.48 mi (12.04 km)	100 yd (91 m)	A mobile home sustained minor roof damage, an outbuilding was destroyed, and trees were snapped or uprooted.
EF1	Spartanburg	Spartanburg	SC	34.926°N 82.03°W	15:21–15:33	10.14 mi (16.32 km)	100 yd (91 m)	This high-end EF1 tornado caused considerable damage in the downtown area of Spartanburg. A few businesses lost large portions of their roofs, and numerous homes and some apartment buildings sustained considerable roof damage. Signs and a billboard were damaged at one business, cars were flipped and damaged at a car dealership, and a small outbuilding structure was destroyed. Trees and power poles were snapped, with one tree falling on a home. One neighborhood that was struck on the western side of town had previously been hit by another EF1 tornado in October 2017.
EF2	ENE of Grover to W of Crowders	Cleveland, Gaston	NC	35.177°N 81.413°W	15:55–16:05	8.66 mi (13.94 km)	150 yd (140 m)	A couple of metal truss transmission towers were toppled. A few homes suffered damage, and numerous trees were snapped or uprooted.
EF2	E of Kannapolis	Cabarrus, Rowan	NC	35.498°N 80.564°W	16:40–16:48	6.19 mi (9.96 km)	75 yd (69 m)	A strong tornado snapped or uprooted many trees, and inflicted damage to numerous homes. One brick home had its roof torn off and sustained collapse of some exterior walls. A gas station sustained minor canopy damage as well.
EF0	S of Gold Hill	Rowan	NC	35.509°N 80.351°W	16:55–16:57	1.52 mi (2.45 km)	50 yd (46 m)	A small barn was damaged and trees were snapped and uprooted.
EF1	WNW of Pineville to Matthews to NE of Hemby Bridge	Mecklenburg, Union	NC	35.094°N 80.917°W	17:16–17:35	17.15 mi (27.60 km)	150 yd (140 m)	This tornado moved through the southeastern suburbs of Charlotte. Several buildings in an industrial area near Pineville suffered roof damage, and the wall of a building under construction collapsed. Tree damage occurred along the rest of the path, with at least one tree falling on a home.
EF1	W of Liberty	Randolph	NC	35.8501°N 79.6473°W	17:31–17:32	0.38 mi (0.61 km)	100 yd (91 m)	An unoccupied large chicken house was flattened, with debris tossed over 0.5 mi (0.80 km). A large farm outbuilding was shifted and twisted off its foundation, and a detached four bay garage had its doors blown in, resulting in the collapse of the entire structure. Trees were damaged along the path.
EF1	SE of Finger to W of Albemarle	Stanly	NC	35.362°N 80.3361°W	17:42–17:49	7.32 mi (11.78 km)	400 yd (370 m)	A double-wide manufactured home was shifted off its foundation and had its roof completely removed by this high-end EF1 tornado. A large storage outbuilding was destroyed, and a child care center had considerable roof damage. Numerous trees were snapped or uprooted.
EF1	SSE of Trenton	Aiken	SC	33.6423°N 81.8037°W	19:52–19:54	1.14 mi (1.83 km)	75 yd (69 m)	A barn and house suffered minor roof damage, and five aluminum and vinyl stables were destroyed. A detached semi trailer, a small equipment trailer, and a small RV trailer were overturned, the latter of which landed on top of an SUV. Numerous pine trees were snapped and uprooted.
EF0	E of Eure	Gates	NC	36.4298°N 76.82°W	21:32–21:35	2.99 mi (4.81 km)	75 yd (69 m)	A tornado formed within a larger area of damaging straight-line winds. The roof was blown off a home, some chicken houses were damaged, and numerous trees were snapped.
EF0	Waycross	Ware	GA	31.208°N 82.3642°W	02:05–02:10	0.18 mi (0.29 km)	50 yd (46 m)	A brief tornado touched down in Waycross, damaging the roof of a warehouse and downing a few power poles.
EF0	N of Seminole to SE of Feather Sound	Pinellas	FL	27.8465°N 82.7898°W	03:38–03:48	9.24 mi (14.87 km)	50 yd (46 m)	Damage was mostly limited to treetops. Some trees were knocked down, some of which landed on homes, injuring one person. Numerous carports were ripped from homes and a crane fell on and closed Interstate 275.

=== February 7 event ===
List of confirmed tornadoes – Friday, February 7, 2020
EF#	Location	County / Parish	State	Start Coord.	Time (UTC)	Path length	Max width	Summary
EF0	Leesburg	Loudoun	VA	39.0946°N 77.5874°W	12:20–12:23	3.36 mi (5.41 km)	250 yd (230 m)	One house had siding and underlayment stripped away, leaving roof trusses exposed. Other homes in Leesburg had roof damage as well. At one location, lawn furniture was lifted and blown in the opposite direction from which trees were bent. Trees were uprooted and numerous large tree limbs were snapped, showing a convergent pattern in places. Two large pine trees fell on unoccupied vehicles.
EF1	SW of Dickerson	Montgomery	MD	39.1763°N 77.4827°W	12:28–12:29	1.11 mi (1.79 km)	150 yd (140 m)	An open-air pole barn was demolished, and a second large barn had its entire roof removed. Several small outbuildings were destroyed bleachers at a horse showing facility were overturned, and a metal frame windmill tower was toppled. A farmhouse had many of its shingles ripped off, and numerous trees were snapped or uprooted.
EF0	Dawsonville	Montgomery	MD	39.1301°N 77.3464°W	12:38–12:39	2.08 mi (3.35 km)	75 yd (69 m)	Several trees were downed onto utility lines. An open facing storage outbuilding was demolished, with debris from the structure inflicting additional damage to two other office trailer structures.
EF1	E of Monrovia	Frederick	MD	39.3427°N 77.2758°W	12:44–12:50	6.74 mi (10.85 km)	150 yd (140 m)	A machine shed and a barn were flattened and a silo was heavily damaged at a farm. Numerous trees and utility lines were damaged.
EF1	Avondale to Westminster to Manchester	Carroll	MD	39.5620°N 77.0310°W	13:03–13:14	10.31 mi (16.59 km)	100 yd (91 m)	This tornado moved directly through Westminster and Manchester along with many other small towns. Trees were snapped or uprooted, some onto cars, roads, and homes. Homes sustained roof, shingle, and siding damage, and residential fencing was also damaged. A large recreational vehicle and a small military trailer were overturned.
EF1	Elk Mills	Cecil	MD	39.65°N 75.82°W	14:39–14:40	1.06 mi (1.71 km)	200 yd (180 m)	Numerous softwood trees and some hardwood trees were uprooted and snapped.

=== February 10 event ===
List of confirmed tornadoes – Monday, February 10, 2020
EF#	Location	County / Parish	State	Start Coord.	Time (UTC)	Path length	Max width
EF1	NW of Piave	Greene	MS	31.4082°N 88.7851°W	00:08–00:10	1.2 mi (1.9 km)	200 yd (180 m)
EF1	Numerous trees were downed, and the tin roof was peeled from the porch of a mobile home near the end of the path.						
EF1	SE of Phoenix	Hinds, Yazoo	MS	32.5019°N 90.5551°W	02:51–02:55	2.86 mi (4.60 km)	300 yd (270 m)
EF1	Numerous trees were snapped and uprooted, and one fallen tree took down a power line.						

=== February 12 event ===
List of confirmed tornadoes – Wednesday, February 12, 2020
EF#	Location	County / Parish	State	Start Coord.	Time (UTC)	Path length	Max width
EF1	SE of Green Hill to WNW of Lexington	Lauderdale	AL	34.96°N 87.50°W	23:13–23:17	3.75 mi (6.04 km)	400 yd (370 m)
EF1	This tornado partially removed the roof of a home, and destroyed a cinder block shed and two smaller sheds. A few other homes sustained lesser roof damage, and numerous trees were snapped or uprooted.						
EF0	ENE of Five Points	Lawrence	TN	35.05°N 87.29°W	23:27–23:29	1.89 mi (3.04 km)	100 yd (91 m)
EF0	This tornado damaged several farm buildings shortly after touching down. It continued northeast and damaged many large trees and tree branches while also causing barn and roof damage on another farm before lifting.						

=== February 13 event ===
List of confirmed tornadoes – Thursday, February 13, 2020
EF#	Location	County / Parish	State	Start Coord.	Time (UTC)	Path length	Max width
EF1	NE of Alexander City	Tallapoosa	AL	33.01°N 85.91°W	10:12–10:15	2.1 mi (3.4 km)	300 yd (270 m)
EF1	A few homes had roof, window, and porch damage, and a truck had sustained a broken window. Trees were snapped or uprooted along the path.						

== March ==
Confirmed tornadoes by Enhanced Fujita rating
EFU	EF0	EF1	EF2	EF3	EF4	EF5	Total
9	28	32	12	2	1	0	84

=== March 2 event ===
List of confirmed tornadoes – Monday, March 2, 2020
EF#	Location	County / Parish	State	Start Coord.	Time (UTC)	Path length	Max width	Summary
EF1	SW of Crofton to NW of Fruit Hill	Christian	KY	37.0335°N 87.5005°W	02:00–02:06	5.51 mi (8.87 km)	400 yd (370 m)	A meteorologist observed this tornado, which crossed U.S. Route 41 just south of Crofton. Four farm structures and two garages were either damaged or destroyed, and several homes sustained minor roof, window, and siding damage. Numerous trees were uprooted along the path.
EF1	Idlewide to NW of Trezevant	Gibson	TN	36.0323°N 88.8275°W	04:12–04:23	7.27 mi (11.70 km)	100 yd (91 m)	The first tornado produced by the long-tracked Nashville supercell damaged several homes and grain bins south of Bradford. Trees were downed as well. A tornado warning was not issued for this tornado.
EF0	ESE of Broadwater to W of Risco	New Madrid	MO	36.57°N 89.9°W	04:15–04:18	3.06 mi (4.92 km)	50 yd (46 m)	A narrow tornado was on the ground approximately three minutes, and was confirmed by chaser via photograph. The tornado remained over an open field and produced no damage.
EF2	S of McKenzie to N of Hollow Rock	Carroll	TN	36.0811°N 88.5287°W	04:41–04:57	14.8 mi (23.8 km)	100 yd (91 m)	The second tornado from the Nashville supercell moved due east across Carroll County. Homes, barns, and grain bins were damaged or destroyed along the path. A few of these homes had their roofs torn off, and one sustained collapse of its exterior walls. Numerous trees were downed as well. A tornado warning was not issued for this tornado.
EF2	NNW of Camden to N of Waverly	Benton, Humphreys	TN	36.0928°N 88.1189°W	05:05–05:31	18.72 mi (30.13 km)	250 yd (230 m)	1 death – Several homes sustained significant damage, some of which sustained roof loss and some collapse of exterior walls. A mobile home was destroyed, and multiple outbuildings were either damaged or destroyed as well. Hundreds of trees were downed along the path, especially as the tornado crossed the Kentucky Lake into Humphreys County. Two people were also injured in Benton County. This was the third tornado from the long-tracked Nashville supercell.
EF0	McEwen to NNE of Few Chapel	Humphreys	TN	36.1162°N 87.6482°W	05:42–05:48	4.8 mi (7.7 km)	50 yd (46 m)	This tornado, the fourth tornado from the Nashville supercell, touched down just northwest of McEwen and moved off to the east, damaging a small barn and causing roof damage to a house. Several trees were downed along the path.

=== March 3 event ===
List of confirmed tornadoes – Tuesday, March 3, 2020
EF#	Location	County / Parish	State	Start Coord.	Time (UTC)	Path length	Max width	Summary
EF2	N of Allen Springs to SSW of Raley Ford	Warren, Allen	KY	36.8500°N 86.3200°W	06:15–06:18	2.7 mi (4.3 km)	250 yd (230 m)	A brief, but strong low-end EF2 tornado embedded within a larger area of straight-line wind damage destroyed three barns, and caused significant roof and siding damage to two houses southeast of Alvaton. A horse trailer was thrown 70 yards (64 m), and over 500 trees were knocked down in all directions.
EF3	W of Nashville to Lebanon to SE of Gordonsville	Davidson, Wilson, Smith	TN	36.1717°N 86.9562°W	06:32–07:35	60.13 mi (96.77 km)	1,600 yd (1,500 m)	5 deaths – See article on this tornado – The fifth tornado from the long-tracked Nashville supercell, this was the 6th costliest tornado in United States history with $1.504 billion in damage. 220 people were injured.
EF0	NNW of Buffalo Valley to S of Gentry	Putnam	TN	36.1603°N 85.8056°W	07:38–07:42	3.32 mi (5.34 km)	50 yd (46 m)	The sixth tornado produced by the Nashville supercell touched down three minutes after the Nashville EF3 tornado lifted and moved across hilly terrain just north of Buffalo Valley. It caused roof damage to several homes in the St. Mary's and Rock Springs communities of Putnam County before dissipating near the Buffalo Valley Dragway. Several outbuildings were damaged and numerous trees were downed as well.
EF4	NW of Baxter to Cookeville	Putnam	TN	36.1716°N 85.6618°W	07:48–07:56	8.39 mi (13.50 km)	900 yd (820 m)	19 deaths – See article on this tornado – This was the seventh tornado from the long-tracked Nashville supercell. 87 people were injured.
EF0	Goffton	Putnam	TN	36.1075°N 85.4461°W	08:05–08:06	0.23 mi (0.37 km)	25 yd (23 m)	The eighth tornado from the Nashville supercell briefly touched down along U.S. Route 70N in the Dry Valley area southeast of Cookeville and caused roof damage to a house, a metal garage, and an outbuilding. Several trees had large branches broken as well.
EF2	SW of Rinnie to NNE of Fairfield Glade	Cumberland, Morgan	TN	36.1399°N 85.0401°W	08:25–08:35	10.07 mi (16.21 km)	500 yd (460 m)	This was the ninth tornado produced by the Nashville supercell. It touched down along U.S. Route 127, causing roof damage to a mobile home. It then destroyed two outbuildings, caused roof damage to two homes, and pushed over a power pole. Two more outbuildings were destroyed before the tornado continued into the Catoosa Wildlife Management Area, where extensive tree damage warranted a low-end EF2 rating. The tornado weakened as it approached the Morgan County border and dissipated in Morgan County.
EF0	W of Lancing	Morgan	TN	36.1264°N 84.799°W	08:40–08:42	3.68 mi (5.92 km)	200 yd (180 m)	The tenth and final tornado produced by the Nashville supercell snapped or uprooted numerous trees and flipped a metal carport.
EF0	S of Greensboro	Hale	AL	32.6846°N 87.6226°W	12:04–12:12	4.34 mi (6.98 km)	220 yd (200 m)	A high-end EF0 tornado snapped or uprooted numerous trees along its path. Some homes suffered damage to shingles and siding, as well as some minor structural damage.
EF1	Lawley	Bibb	AL	32.8648°N 87.0496°W	12:28–12:38	6.21 mi (9.99 km)	525 yd (480 m)	A high-end EF1 tornado blew a manufactured home off its foundation, displaced a vehicle, and snapped or uprooted several dozen trees. A few houses were damaged, and more trees were downed in a wooded area and near the Lawley Fire Department and Community Center.

=== March 4 event ===
List of confirmed tornadoes – Wednesday, March 4, 2020
EF#	Location	County / Parish	State	Start Coord.	Time (UTC)	Path length	Max width
EF0	ESE of Mount Carmel to WSW of Collins	Jefferson Davis, Covington	MS	31.6406°N 89.7644°W	10:39–10:52	9.31 mi (14.98 km)	400 yd (370 m)
EF0	A high-end EF0 tornado removed a few shingles from a house and uprooted or snapped numerous trees.						

=== March 12 event ===
List of confirmed tornadoes – Thursday, March 12, 2020
EF#	Location	County / Parish	State	Start Coord.	Time (UTC)	Path length	Max width
EF0	SE of Ellsinore	Carter	MO	36.8794°N 90.6777°W	22:17–22:18	0.42 mi (0.68 km)	75 yd (69 m)
EF0	Damage was limited to a few trees and tree limbs that were blown down.						
EF0	NE of Poplar Bluff	Butler	MO	36.8571°N 90.6234°W	22:20–22:21	0.6 mi (0.97 km)	100 yd (91 m)
EF0	This tornado touched down shortly after the previous one. Damage was limited to a few trees and tree limbs that were blown down.						
EF1	Northern Whitley City	McCreary	KY	36.73°N 84.48°W	02:07–02:09	1.66 mi (2.67 km)	175 yd (160 m)
EF1	The tornado followed an intermittent path, producing three distinct areas of damage in Whitley City. One house suffered major damage from a fallen tree. Several other houses sustained roof damage as well, and other buildings were also damaged. Trees along the path were snapped as well.						

=== March 13 event ===
List of confirmed tornadoes – Friday, March 13, 2020
EF#	Location	County / Parish	State	Start Coord.	Time (UTC)	Path length	Max width
EF0	NE of Boles Acres	Otero	NM	32.8220°N 105.9581°W	21:15–21:25	0.58 mi (0.93 km)	50 yd (46 m)
EF0	Homes suffered superficial damage, mostly to their roofs, from a combination of the tornado and straight-line winds. One home lost a porch and a large section of its roof. A downed pine tree and debris showed signs of rotation. An anemometer recorded a wind gust to 61 miles per hour (98 km/h). The damage path may have extended over areas of open desert, and so may be longer than the survey indicates.						
EFU	NW of Mentone	Reeves, Loving	TX	31.7099°N 103.6578°W	00:53–01:02	8.97 mi (14.44 km)	300 yd (270 m)
EFU	Although a tornado, which appeared to be significant, was confirmed in the area, the significant damage that occurred at an RV park in Orla was determined to be the result of straight-line winds. No damage directly caused by the tornado was found.						
EF1	NW of Barstow	Ward	TX	31.4747°N 103.4143°W	01:13–01:14	0.47 mi (0.76 km)	20 yd (18 m)
EF1	A short-lived tornado hit an RV park, damaging three trailers and flipping one on its side. A pickup truck was damaged, and a utility pole was snapped.						

=== March 17 event ===
List of confirmed tornadoes – Tuesday, March 17, 2020
EF#	Location	County / Parish	State	Start Coord.	Time (UTC)	Path length	Max width
EFU	NW of Throckmorton	Throckmorton	TX	33.26°N 99.28°W	21:25–21:26	0.07 mi (0.11 km)	35 yd (32 m)
EFU	A brief tornado touchdown was videotaped by storm chasers.						
EF0	NE of Pleasant Hill	Curry	NM	34.5674°N 103.0512°W	23:21–23:26	0.46 mi (0.74 km)	100 yd (91 m)
EF0	A tornado briefly touched down just west of the state line with Texas.						

=== March 18 event ===
List of confirmed tornadoes – Wednesday, March 18, 2020
EF#	Location	County / Parish	State	Start Coord.	Time (UTC)	Path length	Max width
EF0	SE of Jacksboro	Jack	TX	33.1659°N 98.0475°W	01:56–02:05	1.82 mi (2.93 km)	55 yd (50 m)
EF0	This tornado blew a manufactured building off its blocks and damaged tree limbs.						
EF0	N of Breckenridge	Stephens	TX	32.9074°N 98.9049°W	02:04–02:10	1.53 mi (2.46 km)	12 yd (11 m)
EF0	A weak tornado broke tree limbs.						
EF1	NW of Lake Bridgeport to WSW of Chico	Wise	TX	33.2501°N 97.8992°W	02:20–02:32	4.02 mi (6.47 km)	575 yd (526 m)
EF1	Two mobile homes were damaged, part of the roof was removed from a site-built home, and numerous trees were snapped or uprooted by this high-end EF1 tornado. The tornado crossed Lake Bridgeport and the continued through inaccessible land.						
EF1	South Bend to S of Graham	Young	TX	33.0032°N 98.6704°W	02:24–02:36	5.19 mi (8.35 km)	375 yd (343 m)
EF1	Several homes and businesses were damaged, and trees were downed. Two people were injured. (Note: The NCEI lists the event as EF0, but the report summary says the tornado was rated EF1.)						
EF0	SSE of Graham	Young	TX	33.0367°N 98.5460°W	02:36–02:42	1.55 mi (2.49 km)	120 yd (110 m)
EF0	This tornado touched down after the previous one dissipated. A house sustained minor roof damage, and several trees were downed. One person was injured.						
EF1	NE of Alvord	Wise	TX	33.4159°N 97.6198°W	03:07–03:10	0.81 mi (1.30 km)	100 yd (91 m)
EF1	A tornado embedded within a squall line damaged a shed and a sound barrier at a gas well. Trees were snapped or uprooted as well.						
EF1	E of Bryson	Jack	TX	33.1628°N 98.2887°W	03:21–03:23	0.67 mi (1.08 km)	46 yd (42 m)
EF1	Damage was confined to trees in the area. Several tree trunks were snapped halfway up the trunk or uprooted intact. Many of the surrounding trees also had small to large branches broken. (Note: The NCEI lists the event as EF0, but the report summary says the tornado was rated EF1.)						

=== March 19 event ===
List of confirmed tornadoes – Thursday, March 19, 2020
EF#	Location	County / Parish	State	Start Coord.	Time (UTC)	Path length	Max width
EF2	NNE of Nolan to SSW of Merkel	Nolan, Taylor	TX	32.3101°N 100.2189°W	06:00–06:13	10.86 mi (17.48 km)	425 yd (389 m)
EF2	A large windmill turbine was blown over and destroyed, and blades were ripped off other windmills. A residence suffered roof damage, and some high-power transmission poles were toppled. Large tree trunks were snapped, denuded, and shredded with a few trees sustaining low-end debarking, and some ground scouring occurred. Another house also sustained roof damage, a large barn was destroyed, two cars and a tractor were tossed, and another tractor was damaged as well.						
EF1	Southern Tye	Taylor	TX	32.4388°N 99.8697°W	06:32–06:33	0.23 mi (0.37 km)	35 yd (32 m)
EF1	A tornado tore the roof from a manufactured home, damaged playground equipment at a park, and destroyed a metal carport.						
EF2	Northeastern Abilene	Jones, Shackelford	TX	32.5335°N 99.6739°W	06:43–06:50	5.38 mi (8.66 km)	135 yd (123 m)
EF2	This tornado damaged a large building at a correctional facility near Hamby, removing some A/C units from the roof and tearing up fencing. It damaged or destroyed about 100 vehicles in the parking lot, tossing one about 300 yards (270 m) into a nearby lake. Unanchored concrete parking stops were thrown, a small building near the entrance of the facility was damaged, and a home had its garage destroyed and metal roof removed. Several other homes sustained roof damage as well.						
EF0	S of Olive	Creek	OK	36.0019°N 96.4798°W	06:53–06:55	0.6 mi (0.97 km)	75 yd (69 m)
EF0	A barn was destroyed, and a home was damaged by this high-end EF0 tornado. A mobile home and another barn had their roofs blown off as well.						
EF1	Southern Okemah	Okfuskee	OK	35.4043°N 96.3287°W	15:25–15:29	2.7 mi (4.3 km)	225 yd (206 m)
EF1	Two outbuildings were destroyed, a home was damaged, and large tree branches were snapped.						
EF1	Sunfield	Perry	IL	38.0649°N 89.2442°W	20:44–20:46	3.17 mi (5.10 km)	125 yd (114 m)
EF1	At least a dozen homes in and around Sunfield were damaged, four of which sustained major structural damage. Several outbuildings and garages were partially or entirely destroyed, with one house having its attached garage blown off. Five camper trailers were overturned, and one was thrown more than 200 yards (180 m). Dozens of trees were snapped or uprooted, and multiple power poles were downed. One person was injured.						
EF1	Northwestern Dahlgren	Jefferson, Hamilton	IL	38.191°N 88.712°W	21:22–21:26	2.9 mi (4.7 km)	300 yd (270 m)
EF1	Several homes sustained roof damage, and a few barns had roof or structural damage. Two camper trailers were overturned, and dozens of trees were snapped or uprooted in and around Dahlgren.						
EF2	SW of Everton to WSW of Yellville	Boone, Marion	AR	36.1352°N 92.9381°W	23:50–00:11	12.5 mi (20.1 km)	500 yd (460 m)
EF2	Trees were snapped or uprooted and a few homes were damaged in southeastern Everton. A hay barn was destroyed and a house had its porch ripped off, with several other homes and a school also sustaining extensive damage. Many more trees were snapped or uprooted elsewhere along the path, and one person was injured.						
EF1	NNE of Gassville to WSW of Mountain Home	Baxter	AR	36.3302°N 92.4768°W	00:30–00:35	2.16 mi (3.48 km)	600 yd (550 m)
EF1	One house had most of its roof torn off, and some outbuildings were damaged. Several large trees were uprooted or snapped.						
EF1	NNE of Hector	Pope	AR	35.5283°N 92.9439°W	01:09–01:10	0.81 mi (1.30 km)	300 yd (270 m)
EF1	Several trees were snapped or uprooted.						
EF1	NE of Hector	Pope, Van Buren	AR	35.5925°N 92.8366°W	01:23–01:27	2.79 mi (4.49 km)	200 yd (180 m)
EF1	A shed was destroyed, and the roof of a storage barn was damaged. Many trees were downed, with one falling on a shed and another on a trailer.						
EF1	S of Center	Sharp	AR	36.1124°N 91.561°W	03:07–03:13	5.67 mi (9.12 km)	400 yd (370 m)
EF1	Large trees, power poles, and power lines were damaged along the tornado's track. Substantial damage to outbuildings, and lesser damage to a residence, occurred at the Mashburn farm.						

=== March 21 event ===
List of confirmed tornadoes – Saturday, March 21, 2020
EF#	Location	County / Parish	State	Start Coord.	Time (UTC)	Path length	Max width
EF0	SSW of Farmington	San Juan	NM	36.6288°N 108.2774°W	20:30–20:31	0.49 mi (0.79 km)	40 yd (37 m)
EF0	A brief landspout tornado occurred over a farm complex.						

=== March 24 event ===
List of confirmed tornadoes – Tuesday, March 24, 2020
EF#	Location	County / Parish	State	Start Coord.	Time (UTC)	Path length	Max width
EF1	W of Tishomingo, MS to S of Cherokee, AL	Tishomingo (MS), Colbert (AL)	MS, AL	34.6383°N 88.2825°W	22:27–22:51	16.88 mi (27.17 km)	400 yd (370 m)
EF1	A Dollar General store sustained substantial damage, and several commercial buildings, site-built homes, mobile homes, and outbuildings suffered mainly minor damage both in and east of Tishomingo. After crossing into Alabama, the tornado destroyed a chicken house and damaged a home. Several dozen trees were snapped or uprooted throughout. Because of the highly visible presence of debris on radar, the National Weather Service in Huntsville, Alabama issued a tornado emergency for Colbert County as the tornado approached.						
EF1	N of Cowan to NNW of Sewanee	Franklin	TN	35.2211°N 86.0098°W	00:16–00:25	4.76 mi (7.66 km)	175 yd (160 m)
EF1	The tornado snapped or uprooted many trees as it crossed a ridge in a forested area.						

=== March 28 event ===
List of confirmed tornadoes – Saturday, March 28, 2020
EF#	Location	County / Parish	State	Start Coord.	Time (UTC)	Path length	Max width
EF1	NE of Carl to S of Fontanelle	Adams, Adair	IA	41.1507°N 94.6368°W	18:59–19:15	6.47 mi (10.41 km)	115 yd (105 m)
EF1	A tornado damaged an outbuilding, with the rest of the path being over open land.						
EF1	SE of Amagon	Jackson	AR	35.5072°N 91.1184°W	21:18–21:24	5.33 mi (8.58 km)	200 yd (180 m)
EF1	Multiple metal buildings and tractor sheds were damaged or destroyed, and some homes were damaged in and around the small community of Algoa. Farm equipment, outbuildings, and more homes were damaged further along the path, and a few semi-trailers were overturned or rolled. Some trees were uprooted, and power poles were snapped as well.						
EF0	SSW of Rhodes	Marshall	IA	41.8819°N 93.206°W	21:26–21:28	1.3 mi (2.1 km)	75 yd (69 m)
EF0	A tornado moved through rural farmland, causing minor damage to a few groves of trees.						
EF3	Southeastern Jonesboro to E of Aetna	Craighead	AR	35.8094°N 90.6852°W	21:58–22:14	12.53 mi (20.17 km)	600 yd (550 m)
EF3	After touching down just north of I-555, this large and destructive tornado caused major damage on the southeastern side of Jonesboro. Dozens of restaurants and businesses were heavily damaged or destroyed, and The Mall at Turtle Creek sustained significant structural damage. Vehicles in parking lots were tossed and mangled or thrown into piles. Numerous homes were damaged or destroyed in residential areas, some of which were left with only interior walls standing, and a few poorly anchored homes were leveled. Hangars and metal buildings were destroyed at Jonesboro Municipal Airport, and in industrial areas the northeast of the airport. Many trees and power poles were snapped, and a freight train was overturned as well. The tornado caused more minor damage in the Brookland area before dissipating. A total of 22 people were injured.						
EF1	E of Paragould	Greene	AR	36.05°N 90.3808°W	22:25–22:30	2.97 mi (4.78 km)	100 yd (91 m)
EF1	An industrial building, a grain bin, a mobile home, and several storage buildings were damaged. A center pivot irrigation system was overturned, and numerous trees were downed.						
EFU	SW of Oneida	Knox	IL	41.0624°N 90.238°W	22:39–22:40	0.12 mi (0.19 km)	10 yd (9.1 m)
EFU	A brief tornado touched down in a field just southwest of Oneida with no damage reported.						
EFU	S of Hudson	Black Hawk	IA	42.3136°N 92.4686°W	22:39–22:42	2.32 mi (3.73 km)	40 yd (37 m)
EFU	A tornado in a rural area passed very close to a house, but did no damage.						
EF0	ENE of Hudson to S of Waterloo	Black Hawk	IA	42.4201°N 92.3874°W	22:49–22:51	2.06 mi (3.32 km)	115 yd (105 m)
EF0	A tornado removed the roof of a barn and destroyed a garage. Other buildings and trees were also damaged.						
EFU	NW of Evandale	Black Hawk	IA	42.4725°N 92.3138°W	22:55–22:56	0.32 mi (0.51 km)	20 yd (18 m)
EFU	A tornado occurred in an unpopulated near the Waterloo Waste Water Treatment Plant along the Cedar River. While tree damage may have occurred, no damage was reported.						
EF1	NNW of Jesup to SE of Fairbank	Buchanan	IA	42.5086°N 92.0809°W	23:15–23:25	7.38 mi (11.88 km)	50 yd (46 m)
EF1	A tornado moved north-northeast passing through Littleton. There was damage to outbuildings and a barn while also uprooting trees at a farmstead.						
EF1	Western Oelwein	Fayette	IA	42.648°N 91.9414°W	23:30–23:36	3.93 mi (6.32 km)	140 yd (130 m)
EF1	A rain-wrapped tornado damaged apartment buildings and trees on the west side of Oelwein. One person was indirectly injured after stepping on broken glass after the tornado dissipated.						
EF0	E of Maynard	Fayette	IA	42.7525°N 91.8552°W	23:40–23:43	3.6 mi (5.8 km)	50 yd (46 m)
EF0	A weak tornado caused minor damage at several farms.						
EFU	ESE of Andover to ENE of Cambridge	Henry	IL	41.28°N 90.24°W	00:43–00:44	1.07 mi (1.72 km)	10 yd (9.1 m)
EFU	A brief tornado was photographed but did no observable damage.						
EF2	Corydon to W of Spottsville	Henderson	KY	37.7418°N 87.7038°W	00:58–01:12	16.79 mi (27.02 km)	500 yd (460 m)
EF2	This low-end EF2 tornado downed trees in Corydon before moving through the southern fringes of Henderson. Dozens of homes sustained roof, siding, fascia, and soffit damage, and over a dozen barns and outbuildings sustained roof or structural damage. One large, well-built barn was completely destroyed with the debris scattered across a field. Hundreds of trees were either snapped or uprooted along the path, and several power poles were snapped as well.						
EF1	SE of Ipava	Fulton	IL	40.3361°N 90.319°W	01:01–01:04	2.06 mi (3.32 km)	100 yd (91 m)
EF1	A barn, gazebo, the front porch of a house, outbuildings, and several roofs were damaged.						
EF2	Newburgh	Henderson (KY), Warrick (IN)	KY, IN	37.9372°N 87.4181°W	01:18–01:25	5.06 mi (8.14 km)	575 yd (526 m)
EF2	Five homes in town sustained partial to total roof loss, one of which had a few top floor exterior walls ripped off. Dozens more homes sustained minor to moderate damage. Many garages and other small buildings were damaged, and hundreds of trees were either snapped or uprooted, some of which fell on homes. Numerous power lines were knocked down as well. Two people sustained minor injuries.						
EF1	WSW of Tampico	Whiteside	IL	41.6003°N 89.8725°W	01:20–01:22	2.17 mi (3.49 km)	20 yd (18 m)
EF1	Outbuildings were damaged, a farm irrigation system was flipped over, and trees were uprooted.						
EF1	SW of Sherrill	Dubuque	IA	42.5947°N 90.8138°W	01:25–01:31	3.8 mi (6.1 km)	50 yd (46 m)
EF1	Outbuildings were significantly damaged, and several trees were uprooted.						
EF1	N of Potosi to W of Ellenboro	Grant	WI	42.7060°N 90.7067°W	01:35–01:41	6.22 mi (10.01 km)	120 yd (110 m)
EF1	Numerous farms and outbuildings were damaged, and trees and power lines were blown down.						
EF1	Western Peoria	Peoria	IL	40.6571°N 89.6754°W	01:58–02:03	3.27 mi (5.26 km)	50 yd (46 m)
EF1	This tornado touched down in the western part of Peoria. Roofs were damaged at a shopping center and in a subdivision, and trees were damaged at a golf course.						
EF1	E of Oregon to WSW of Stillman Valley	Ogle	IL	42.0178°N 89.2964°W	02:13–02:24	7.03 mi (11.31 km)	400 yd (370 m)
EF1	Several structures were damaged, primarily barns and outbuildings. A few homes were damaged as well. and trees and power lines were downed.						

=== March 29 event ===
List of confirmed tornadoes – Sunday, March 29, 2020
EF#	Location	County / Parish	State	Start Coord.	Time (UTC)	Path length	Max width
EF0	ESE of Sparta to WSW of Pleasant Hill	White	TN	35.9146°N 85.434°W	07:29–07:33	6.9 mi (11.1 km)	75 yd (69 m)
EF0	Several outbuildings and barns were destroyed, and some homes sustained roof damage. Numerous trees were uprooted. This tornado was embedded in a larger area of straight-line wind damage across White County.						

=== March 30 event ===
List of confirmed tornadoes – Monday, March 30, 2020
EF#	Location	County / Parish	State	Start Coord.	Time (UTC)	Path length	Max width
EFU	N of Pantex	Carson	TX	35.47°N 101.57°W	22:22–22:33	3.55 mi (5.71 km)	50 yd (46 m)
EFU	The tornado remained in open grassland. No damage occurred.						
EF0	N of Sunray	Sherman	TX	36.1738°N 101.8499°W	22:50–22:58	0.21 mi (0.34 km)	20 yd (18 m)
EF0	A nearly stationary landspout remained in a field and did no damage.						

=== March 31 event ===
List of confirmed tornadoes – Tuesday, March 31, 2020
EF#	Location	County / Parish	State	Start Coord.	Time (UTC)	Path length	Max width
EF1	SE of Benndale to S of Lucedale	George	MS	30.84°N 88.75°W	14:30–14:42	8.15 mi (13.12 km)	50 yd (46 m)
EF1	The tornado removed roofs from two homes and damaged several more. Several large hardwood trees were uprooted. One person was injured.						
EF0	N of Meadville	Montgomery	AL	32.0817°N 86.1751°W	15:23–15:30	3.33 mi (5.36 km)	190 yd (170 m)
EF0	Tree limbs were broken.						
EF0	WSW of Orion	Pike	AL	31.9371°N 86.0665°W	15:33–15:34	0.14 mi (0.23 km)	80 yd (73 m)
EF0	A few pine trees were snapped and uprooted.						
EF0	NW of Troy	Pike	AL	31.8539°N 86.0307°W	15:34–15:36	1.61 mi (2.59 km)	80 yd (73 m)
EF0	A tornado moved near the Troy Municipal Airport, removing the roof from a barn and downing several trees.						
EF0	SSE of Sandfield	Pike	AL	31.9011°N 85.8111°W	15:51–15:52	0.83 mi (1.34 km)	180 yd (160 m)
EF0	The tornado touched down in a rural wooded area and downed several trees.						
EF2	NNE of Baker Hill, AL to SW of Benevolence, GA	Barbour (AL), Quitman (GA), Randolph (GA)	AL, GA	31.8173°N 85.2636°W	16:34–17:18	29.97 mi (48.23 km)	350 yd (320 m)
EF2	This strong tornado touched down near Sandy Point, AL, causing minor damage to several homes and an outbuilding to the northeast of Baker Hill. The tornado then intensified to high-end EF2 strength and impacted a country club neighborhood in the Terese community south of Eufaula, tearing roofs off of several well built houses, a few of which sustained some collapse of exterior walls. After crossing into Georgia, an outbuilding and a barn were destroyed. Numerous trees were snapped or uprooted, including one that fell on a mobile home, injuring a man inside.						
EF0	S of Portland	Walton	FL	30.462°N 86.1945°W	17:55–17:56	0.17 mi (0.27 km)	25 yd (23 m)
EF0	A waterspout moved onshore, causing minor roof damage to a home and snapping a tree.						
EF1	SSW of Lamont to SW of Sirmans	Jefferson, Madison	FL	30.3154°N 83.8415°W	20:10–20:18	9.21 mi (14.82 km)	150 yd (140 m)
EF1	Hundreds of trees were snapped or uprooted, and at least one power pole was snapped.						
EF1	S of Greenville to SW of Madison	Madison	FL	30.4215°N 83.6361°W	20:17–20:30	11.74 mi (18.89 km)	100 yd (91 m)
EF1	Hundreds of trees were snapped or uprooted.						
EF0	Madison	Madison	FL	30.461°N 83.4112°W	20:33–20:35	0.11 mi (0.18 km)	50 yd (46 m)
EF0	A business in town had its roof uplifted, and an outbuilding and several trees were damaged.						
EF0	SSW of Live Oak	Suwannee	FL	30.1767°N 83.0498°W	21:26–21:27	0.8 mi (1.3 km)	704 yd (644 m)
EF0	A chicken coop and several trees were damaged, with a large branch falling on a house.						
EF0	Northern Richland	Benton	WA	46.33°N 119.28°W	21:30–21:45	0.1 mi (0.16 km)	20 yd (18 m)
EF0	A landspout tornado touched down at the north edge of Richland and caused no damage.						
EF0	N of Guana River State Park	St. Johns	FL	30.1407°N 81.3564°W	23:29–23:30	0.39 mi (0.63 km)	704 yd (644 m)
EF0	Trees were damaged and a window was broken.						

== See also ==
- Tornadoes of 2020
- List of United States tornadoes from November to December 2019
- List of United States tornadoes in April 2020
