= Tornado outbreak of February 5–7, 2020 =

2020 tornado outbreak in the United States

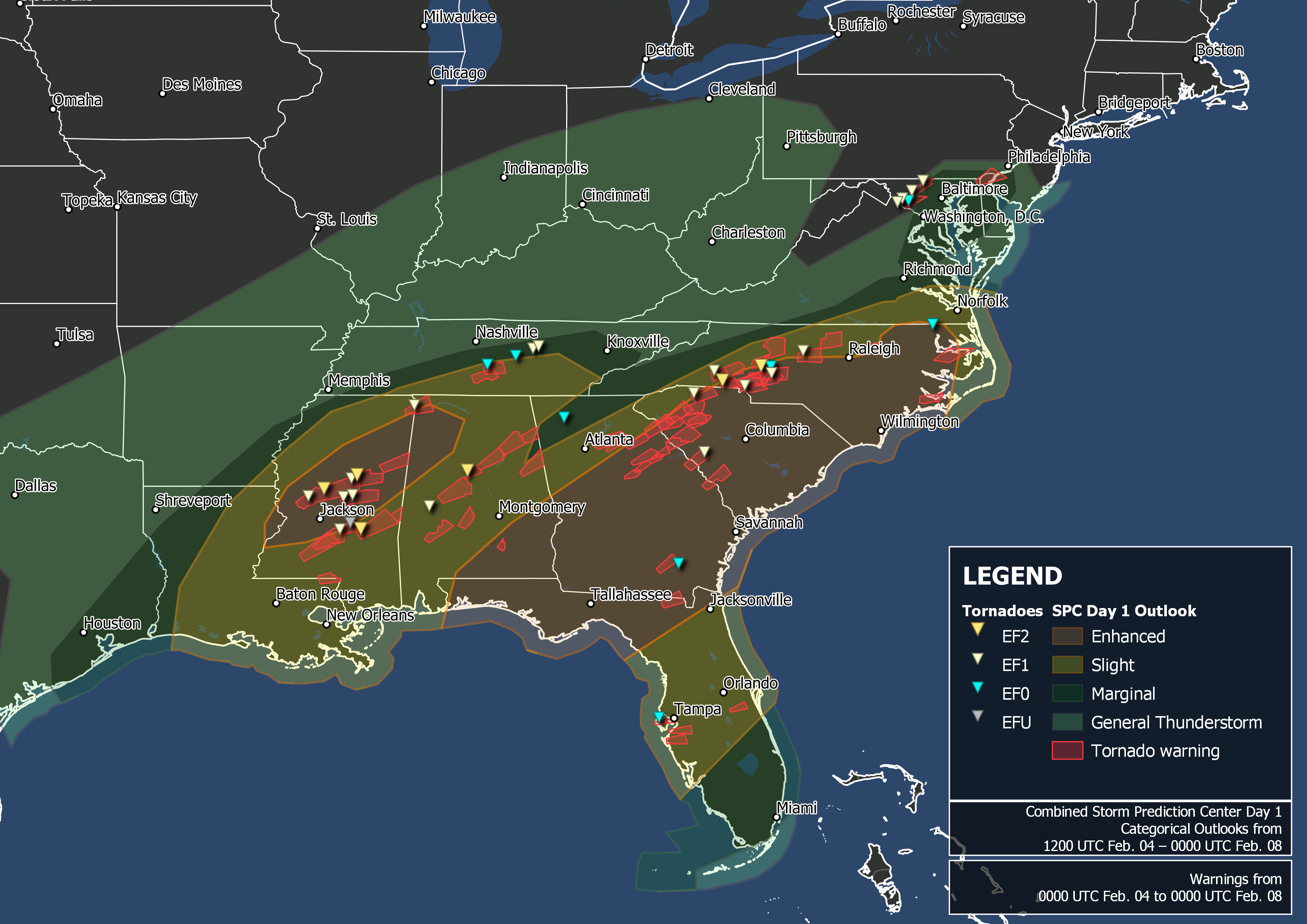
- Map of tornado warnings and confirmed tornadoes from the outbreak

Meteorological history
- Duration: February 5–7, 2020

Tornado outbreak
- Tornadoes: 37
- Max. rating: EF2 tornado
- Highest winds: Tornadic – 130 mph (210 km/h) (Kings Mountain, North Carolina EF2 tornado on February 6); Non-tornadic – 76 mph (122 km/h) at Naval Air Station Jacksonville
- Largest hail: 1.75 in (4.4 cm) (multiple locations)

Overall effects
- Fatalities: 1 (+4 non-tornadic)
- Injuries: 7
- Damage: ≥$925 million (2020 USD)
- Areas affected: Southeastern United States, Mid-Atlantic
- Part of the 'tornado outbreaks of 2020, Storm Ciara, 2019–20 North American winter seasons'

A multi-day severe weather and tornado outbreak impacted the Southeastern and Mid-Atlantic United States from February 5–7. A powerful upper-level trough progressed eastward across the country, intersecting an abundant supply of moist air to produce severe weather. An eastward-propagating cold front supported a damaging squall line across the Southeast U.S. on February 5–6; supercell thunderstorms ahead of this line also produced numerous tornadoes. One EF1 tornado in the pre-dawn hours of February 6 killed one person in Demopolis, Alabama. On the morning of February 7, a secondary front progressed across Maryland and Virginia, unexpectedly leading to hundreds of damaging wind reports across Virginia, Maryland, Delaware, New Jersey, New York, Connecticut, Rhode Island, and Massachusetts. Five tornadoes were reported in the Washington, D.C., area, the most on record for a wintertime severe weather event. Across the three-day outbreak, 37 tornadoes were confirmed, including several that were strong and long-tracked. The tornado outbreak was part of a much larger storm complex that would eventually become European windstorm Storm Ciara.

== Meteorological synopsis ==
Rounding out the final day of January, the Storm Prediction Center (SPC) began highlighting the potential for a prolonged period of severe weather across the Southern United States in the extended range forecast. General 15% severe probabilities yielded to a Slight risk across portions of the central Gulf Coast region valid on February 5. This outlook underwent significant expansions northward on February 4, and an Enhanced risk was introduced from extreme northeast Louisiana into northwestern Alabama shortly before the beginning of the tornado outbreak; this area saw the strongest tornadoes.

On the morning of February 5, a major upper-level trough was progressing eastward across the Central United States, supporting broad southwesterly winds in advance of it. At the surface, a stationary front existed from northwestern Alabama into a low-pressure area over northern Louisiana, transitioning into a cold front southwestward into southeastern Texas. Despite high instability and favorable wind shear profiles, storms were initially slow to organize across Mississippi as widespread cloud cover prevented the northward progression of the warm sector and temperatures warmed aloft. This trend was only temporary, however, with an abrupt increase in tornadic activity throughout the afternoon hours. Numerous tornadoes occurred throughout Mississippi into Alabama, including several strong and long-tracked tornadoes. Into the overnight hours, southerly low-level winds continued to provide a moist environment, with dewpoints in the upper 60s °F. Storms intensified along an eastward-progressing cold front over Mississippi, aided by generally parallel wind shear profiles and cooling upper-level temperatures as the trough approached from the west. Ahead of the front, additional supercells formed and produced tornadoes, including an exceptionally long-lived EF2 tornado across Jasper, Clarke, and Lauderdale counties in Mississippi. An EF1 tornado southeast of Demopolis, Alabama, destroyed two manufactured homes, causing one death and one injury.

Throughout February 6, an Enhanced risk of severe weather existed across a large section of the Southeastern United States. Overnight severe thunderstorms in Mississippi and Alabama continued to persist and shift eastward throughout the early morning hours. Despite only modest instability across northeastern Georgia into central North Carolina, the presence of a very moist and strongly-sheared environment led to many more tornadoes, including two EF2 tornadoes in North Carolina south of Kings Mountain and east of Kannapolis. The line of strong to severe thunderstorms continued eastward throughout the afternoon of February 6, producing hundreds of damaging wind reports before shifting offshore. The next morning, following a brief reprieve in severe thunderstorm activity, the SPC outlined a Marginal risk across eastern Virginia and central Maryland. Here, a secondary front supported an intensifying line of thunderstorms in a low instability but high wind shear environment. In defiance of forecasts, this band of convection produced hundreds of damaging wind reports across the Mid-Atlantic over the course of four hours. In addition, five tornadoes were confirmed throughout the Washington, DC, area, making this the largest wintertime tornado outbreak on record there.

== Confirmed tornadoes ==
Confirmed tornadoes by Enhanced Fujita rating
EFU	EF0	EF1	EF2	EF3	EF4	EF5	Total
0	9	21	7	0	0	0	37

=== February 5 event ===
List of confirmed tornadoes – Wednesday, February 5, 2020 (Note: All dates are based on the local time zone where the tornado touched down; however, all times are in Coordinated Universal Time for consistency.)
EF#	Location	County / Parish	State	Start Coord.	Time (UTC)	Path length	Max width
EF1	NNE of Magee	Simpson	MS	31.9546°N 89.752°W	20:57–21:07	6.17 mi (9.93 km)	150 yd (140 m)
EF1	Two houses sustained moderate roof damage, and another house had a window blown out and a carport destroyed. A car and an RV were rolled and destroyed, and a shed lost most of its tin roof. A mobile home was pushed off its blocks and its carport was blown away. Trees were uprooted and snapped along the path.						
EF2	Shongelo	Smith	MS	32.0978°N 89.5263°W	21:20–21:24	2.64 mi (4.25 km)	440 yd (400 m)
EF2	A low-end EF2 tornado moved through a forest, snapping or uprooting a substantial number of trees.						
EF1	S of Oil City to NE of Little Yazoo	Yazoo	MS	32.6797°N 90.4403°W	21:28–21:40	8.12 mi (13.07 km)	800 yd (730 m)
EF1	A large tornado destroyed a shed, inflicted minor shingle damage to a home sustained, and snapped or uprooted numerous trees.						
EF2	W of Vaughan to ESE of Goodman	Yazoo, Holmes, Attala	MS	32.8169°N 90.0995°W	21:57–22:24	18.71 mi (30.11 km)	900 yd (820 m)
EF2	A large, low-end EF2 tornado snapped and uprooted hundreds of trees and downed several power poles and lines. A large metal storage shed was destroyed, a large metal building had some of its walls pulled out, and about a dozen homes suffered some degree of roof damage. A large hay barn was completely destroyed and several other outbuildings were damaged. Four people were injured.						
EF1	E of Kosciusko to S of Ethel	Attala	MS	33.0678°N 89.501°W	22:46–22:48	1.66 mi (2.67 km)	300 yd (270 m)
EF1	A few dozen trees, three metal sheds, and a mobile home were damaged. Power lines were downed as well.						
EF2	E of Ethel to SE of McCool	Attala, Choctaw	MS	33.1175°N 89.3761°W	22:58–23:04	5.89 mi (9.48 km)	800 yd (730 m)
EF2	A low-end EF2 tornado downed power lines and snapped or uprooted many large trees. A mobile home and an RV were damaged by fallen trees. A few houses suffered some roof damage, and a few sheds were damaged as well.						
EF1	N of Maud	Colbert	AL	34.6617°N 88.1282°W	23:18–23:25	1.32 mi (2.12 km)	60 yd (55 m)
EF1	Small sheds and outbuildings sustained roof damage, and the walls of one structure collapsed. Trees were uprooted and snapped along the path.						
EF1	SSW of Carthage	Leake	MS	32.6636°N 89.6748°W	23:33–23:48	9.13 mi (14.69 km)	250 yd (230 m)
EF1	A chicken house was collapsed, and numerous trees were snapped or uprooted.						
EF1	N of Standing Pine	Leake	MS	32.7049°N 89.476°W	23:50–23:57	4.91 mi (7.90 km)	150 yd (140 m)
EF1	A mobile home was rolled several yards and destroyed, and a nearby compost shed was also demolished. Another manufactured home sustained some roof damage, and numerous trees were snapped or uprooted.						
EF1	Loretto to S of Leoma	Lawrence	TN	35.0723°N 87.4649°W	23:55–00:07	10.05 mi (16.17 km)	300 yd (270 m)
EF1	A well-built detached garage was destroyed, a bank sign was blown down, several homes and other structures in town suffered damage, power lines were toppled, and numerous trees were snapped or uprooted.						
EF1	Lawrenceburg	Lawrence	TN	35.223°N 87.3984°W	23:56–00:07	10.51 mi (16.91 km)	300 yd (270 m)
EF1	This tornado moved directly through Lawrenceburg. Numerous trees were snapped or uprooted, one of which fell on a house. A library in Lawrenceburg had part of its roof torn off. Outbuildings, barns, power lines, and the roofs of homes were damaged. One person was injured.						
EF0	NW of Shelbyville	Bedford	TN	35.5498°N 86.5358°W	00:47–00:57	10.36 mi (16.67 km)	50 yd (46 m)
EF0	A carport and the roofs of a barn and some other structures were damaged. Numerous trees were snapped or uprooted, and utility poles were downed.						
EF0	N of Centertown to S of Green Hill	Warren	TN	35.7421°N 85.916°W	01:23–01:31	6.34 mi (10.20 km)	50 yd (46 m)
EF0	A barn was completely destroyed, a house suffered minor damage to its front porch and garage, and several trees were snapped, some of which were downed onto a mobile home.						
EF1	E of Shady Grove to S of Sparta	White	TN	35.9001°N 85.5391°W	01:55–01:59	3.86 mi (6.21 km)	200 yd (180 m)
EF1	This tornado moved off Gum Springs Mountain to just south of Sparta, removing the roof from a home, damaging a barn and an outbuilding, and downing many trees and numerous power lines.						
EF1	NE of Sparta to DeRossett	White	TN	35.9522°N 85.4173°W	02:02–02:09	6.39 mi (10.28 km)	250 yd (230 m)
EF1	Several outbuildings and barns, a covered porch, and the roof of a house were destroyed. A mobile home suffered extensive damage, and numerous trees were snapped. This tornado ascended the Cumberland Plateau at Bon Air Mountain.						
EF2	S of Bay Springs to Enterprise to ESE of Toomsuba	Jasper, Clarke, Lauderdale	MS	31.9406°N 89.2971°W	04:51–05:57	59.85 mi (96.32 km)	1,320 yd (1,210 m)
EF2	A large, strong, and long-tracked tornado snapped or uprooted countless trees and toppled a metal fire tower. The roofs of numerous houses, sheds, outbuildings, trailers, barns, and chicken houses were damaged. A couple of well-built homes lost large portions of their roofs. In the town of Enterprise, trees were downed and a metal storage building was destroyed at EF1 strength, while trees were snapped at EF2 strength farther northeast in Basic. Wooden power poles were snapped and power lines were downed, and a high school suffered minor awning damage.						

=== February 6 event ===
List of confirmed tornadoes – Thursday, February 6, 2020
EF#	Location	County / Parish	State	Start Coord.	Time (UTC)	Path length	Max width
EF2	NNW of Pea Ridge to Helena	Shelby	AL	33.2121°N 86.9694°W	07:57–08:09	9.91 mi (15.95 km)	700 yd (640 m)
EF2	Thousands of trees were snapped or uprooted, and some areas suffered total deforestation. Several homes sustained minor roof and siding damage, and the window of one home was shattered.						
EF1	SE of Demopolis	Marengo	AL	32.4617°N 87.8012°W	08:13–08:15	1.29 mi (2.08 km)	400 yd (370 m)
EF1	1 death – Two manufactured homes were destroyed by this high-end EF1 tornado, resulting in one fatality and one injury. A barn was destroyed, four other houses were damaged, and several trees were snapped or uprooted.						
EF0	NE of Adairsville	Bartow, Gordon	GA	34.3951°N 84.8631°W	10:28–10:30	2.24 mi (3.60 km)	200 yd (180 m)
EF0	A mobile home lost its entire roof and was slightly moved off its foundation by this high-end EF0 tornado. Several homes sustained roof damaged, and the front deck of one home was lifted and damaged. About a dozen trees were uprooted.						
EF1	W of Lawndale to NE of Fallston	Cleveland, Lincoln	NC	35.4174°N 81.5876°W	14:45–14:59	7.48 mi (12.04 km)	100 yd (91 m)
EF1	A mobile home sustained minor roof damage, an outbuilding was destroyed, and trees were snapped or uprooted.						
EF1	Spartanburg	Spartanburg	SC	34.926°N 82.03°W	15:21–15:33	10.14 mi (16.32 km)	100 yd (91 m)
EF1	This high-end EF1 tornado caused considerable damage in the downtown area of Spartanburg. A few businesses lost large portions of their roofs, and numerous homes and some apartment buildings sustained considerable roof damage. Signs and a billboard were damaged at one business, cars were flipped and damaged at a car dealership, and a small outbuilding structure was destroyed. Trees and power poles were snapped, with one tree falling on a home. One neighborhood that was struck on the western side of town had previously been hit by another EF1 tornado in October 2017.						
EF2	ENE of Grover to W of Crowders	Cleveland, Gaston	NC	35.177°N 81.413°W	15:55–16:05	8.66 mi (13.94 km)	150 yd (140 m)
EF2	A couple of metal truss transmission towers were toppled. A few homes suffered damage, and numerous trees were snapped or uprooted.						
EF2	E of Kannapolis	Cabarrus, Rowan	NC	35.498°N 80.564°W	16:40–16:48	6.19 mi (9.96 km)	75 yd (69 m)
EF2	A strong tornado snapped or uprooted many trees, and inflicted damage to numerous homes. One brick home had its roof torn off and sustained collapse of some exterior walls. A gas station sustained minor canopy damage as well.						
EF0	S of Gold Hill	Rowan	NC	35.509°N 80.351°W	16:55–16:57	1.52 mi (2.45 km)	50 yd (46 m)
EF0	A small barn was damaged and trees were snapped and uprooted.						
EF1	WNW of Pineville to Matthews to NE of Hemby Bridge	Mecklenburg, Union	NC	35.094°N 80.917°W	17:16–17:35	17.15 mi (27.60 km)	150 yd (140 m)
EF1	This tornado moved through the southeastern suburbs of Charlotte. Several buildings in an industrial area near Pineville suffered roof damage, and the wall of a building under construction collapsed. Tree damage occurred along the rest of the path, with at least one tree falling on a home.						
EF1	W of Liberty	Randolph	NC	35.8501°N 79.6473°W	17:31–17:32	0.38 mi (0.61 km)	100 yd (91 m)
EF1	An unoccupied large chicken house was flattened, with debris tossed over 0.5 mi (0.80 km). A large farm outbuilding was shifted and twisted off its foundation, and a detached four bay garage had its doors blown in, resulting in the collapse of the entire structure. Trees were damaged along the path.						
EF1	SE of Finger to W of Albemarle	Stanly	NC	35.362°N 80.3361°W	17:42–17:49	7.32 mi (11.78 km)	400 yd (370 m)
EF1	A double-wide manufactured home was shifted off its foundation and had its roof completely removed by this high-end EF1 tornado. A large storage outbuilding was destroyed, and a child care center had considerable roof damage. Numerous trees were snapped or uprooted.						
EF1	SSE of Trenton	Aiken	SC	33.6423°N 81.8037°W	19:52–19:54	1.14 mi (1.83 km)	75 yd (69 m)
EF1	A barn and house suffered minor roof damage, and five aluminum and vinyl stables were destroyed. A detached semi trailer, a small equipment trailer, and a small RV trailer were overturned, the latter of which landed on top of an SUV. Numerous pine trees were snapped and uprooted.						
EF0	E of Eure	Gates	NC	36.4298°N 76.82°W	21:32–21:35	2.99 mi (4.81 km)	75 yd (69 m)
EF0	A tornado formed within a larger area of damaging straight-line winds. The roof was blown off a home, some chicken houses were damaged, and numerous trees were snapped.						
EF0	Waycross	Ware	GA	31.208°N 82.3642°W	02:05–02:10	0.18 mi (0.29 km)	50 yd (46 m)
EF0	A brief tornado touched down in Waycross, damaging the roof of a warehouse and downing a few power poles.						
EF0	N of Seminole to SE of Feather Sound	Pinellas	FL	27.8465°N 82.7898°W	03:38–03:48	9.24 mi (14.87 km)	50 yd (46 m)
EF0	Damage was mostly limited to treetops. Some trees were knocked down, some of which landed on homes, injuring one person. Numerous carports were ripped from homes and a crane fell on and closed Interstate 275.						

=== February 7 event ===
List of confirmed tornadoes – Friday, February 7, 2020
EF#	Location	County / Parish	State	Start Coord.	Time (UTC)	Path length	Max width
EF0	Leesburg	Loudoun	VA	39.0946°N 77.5874°W	12:20–12:23	3.36 mi (5.41 km)	250 yd (230 m)
EF0	One house had siding and underlayment stripped away, leaving roof trusses exposed. Other homes in Leesburg had roof damage as well. At one location, lawn furniture was lifted and blown in the opposite direction from which trees were bent. Trees were uprooted and numerous large tree limbs were snapped, showing a convergent pattern in places. Two large pine trees fell on unoccupied vehicles.						
EF1	SW of Dickerson	Montgomery	MD	39.1763°N 77.4827°W	12:28–12:29	1.11 mi (1.79 km)	150 yd (140 m)
EF1	An open-air pole barn was demolished, and a second large barn had its entire roof removed. Several small outbuildings were destroyed bleachers at a horse showing facility were overturned, and a metal frame windmill tower was toppled. A farmhouse had many of its shingles ripped off, and numerous trees were snapped or uprooted.						
EF0	Dawsonville	Montgomery	MD	39.1301°N 77.3464°W	12:38–12:39	2.08 mi (3.35 km)	75 yd (69 m)
EF0	Several trees were downed onto utility lines. An open facing storage outbuilding was demolished, with debris from the structure inflicting additional damage to two other office trailer structures.						
EF1	E of Monrovia	Frederick	MD	39.3427°N 77.2758°W	12:44–12:50	6.74 mi (10.85 km)	150 yd (140 m)
EF1	A machine shed and a barn were flattened and a silo was heavily damaged at a farm. Numerous trees and utility lines were damaged.						
EF1	Avondale to Westminster to Manchester	Carroll	MD	39.5620°N 77.0310°W	13:03–13:14	10.31 mi (16.59 km)	100 yd (91 m)
EF1	This tornado moved directly through Westminster and Manchester along with many other small towns. Trees were snapped or uprooted, some onto cars, roads, and homes. Homes sustained roof, shingle, and siding damage, and residential fencing was also damaged. A large recreational vehicle and a small military trailer were overturned.						
EF1	Elk Mills	Cecil	MD	39.65°N 75.82°W	14:39–14:40	1.06 mi (1.71 km)	200 yd (180 m)
EF1	Numerous softwood trees and some hardwood trees were uprooted and snapped.						

== Non-tornadic impacts ==
On February 4 and 5, snow fell in Texas, Oklahoma and Missouri; locally peaking at 14 inches (36 cm) in Jayton, Texas. 9,000 customers lost power in the Oklahoma City metropolitan area, where several school districts, colleges and universities closed due to the inclement weather. Scattered school closures also occurred in Texas and Missouri. A major collision closed the Westbound lane of I-70 near Rocheport, Missouri. In the Southeast, severe weather claimed the lives of 5 people and left 250,000 without power. A PDS-Tornado Warning was issued for Charlotte, North Carolina as a tornado touched down nearby. Those at Charlotte Douglas International Airport were advised to move away from windows. Severe thunderstorms produced wind gusts up to 76 miles per hour (122 km/h) in Florida, capable of toppling a crane near Tampa. Several inches of rain fell, causing severe flash flooding across the Carolinas and Virginia. In New York City, following an afternoon of record warm temperatures, high winds affected the city at night, which affected NYC Ferry service, and forced vehicle restrictions on the Throgs Neck Bridge, Bronx-Whitestone Bridge, RFK Bridge and Verrazano Bridge. Over 12 inches (30 cm) of snow fell in northern New England. Sixteen million across 6 provinces in Canada were impacted by this storm. By the time it had reached them, its precipation shield exceeded 2,500 kilometres (1,600 mi) across. Powerful wind gusts, exceeding 100 kilometres per hour (62 mph) at times, left tens of thousands without power across the region.

== See also ==
- List of North American tornadoes and tornado outbreaks
