= Tinsley, Mississippi =

- Unincorporated community
- Location within Mississippi Location within the United States
- Coordinates: 32°43′55″N 90°27′37″W
- Country: United States
- State: Mississippi
- County: Yazoo
- Elevation: 220 ft (67 m)
- Time zone: UTC-6 (Central (CST))
  - Summer (DST): UTC-5 (CDT)
- ZIP code: 39173
- Area code: 662
- GNIS feature ID: 690992

Tinsley is an unincorporated community located in Yazoo County, Mississippi, United States. Tinsley is approximately 11 miles (18 km) south of Yazoo City and 4 miles (6.4 km) North of Oil City near U.S. Route 49.

== History ==
Tinsley had a post office, several stores, and a population of 50 in 1907.

In 1939, Tinsley Oil Field, located south of the settlement, was the site of the first commercial discovery of oil in Mississippi.

A line of the Illinois Central Railroad passes through Tinsley. In 1941, a freight train rear-ended another freight train at Tinsley. The impact derailed 28 cars, including 13 carrying molasses.

In 2005, Denbury Resources announced plans to inject carbon dioxide in oil fields in Tinsley, using pipelines with compressed gas flowing from Jackson. The pipeline was built in 2007, and in 2011 it had a "blowout" that sickened one worker and killed deer, fish and birds. The company later paid a fine of $662,500.

== Transportation ==
Amtrak’s City of New Orleans, which operates between New Orleans and Chicago, passes through the town on CN tracks, but makes no stop. The nearest station is located in Yazoo City, 11 miles (18 km) to the north.

== Education ==
Residents are a part of the Yazoo County School District, and are zoned to Yazoo County Middle School and Yazoo County High School.

== See also ==
- Jackson Volcano
- Mississippi embayment
