= Ravenscroft, Tennessee =

- Unincorporated community
- Location within Tennessee Location within the United States
- Coordinates: 35°58′38″N 85°17′43″W
- Country: United States
- State: Tennessee
- County: White
- Elevation: 1,890 ft (580 m)
- Time zone: UTC-6 (Central (CST))
  - Summer (DST): UTC-5 (CDT)
- Zip Code: 38583
- Area code: 931
- GNIS feature ID: 1269229

Ravenscroft is an unincorporated community in White County, Tennessee, United States. Ravenscroft lies on the Cumberland Plateau to the east of Sparta off US Highway 70. Along with the adjacent areas of Bon Air and DeRossett, Ravenscroft is part of a greater community known as "BonDeCroft."

Ravenscroft is the birthplace of journalist and author Carl T. Rowan, who served as United States Ambassador to Finland and director of the United States Information Agency.
