= Denbury Resources =

American energy company

Denbury Inc
- Formerly: Denbury Resources; Newscope Resources
- Type: Public
- Traded as: NYSE: DEN
- Industry: Petroleum industry
- Founded: 1951
- Defunct: November 3, 2023
- Fate: Acquired by ExxonMobil
- Headquarters: Plano, Texas, United States
- Key people: Christian S. Kendall, President & CEO; Mark C. Allen, CFO
- Products: Petroleum; Natural gas
- Production output: 48.770 thousand barrels of oil equivalent (298,370 GJ) per day
- Revenue: ▲$1.258 billion (2021)
- Net income: ▲$56 million (2021)
- Total assets: ▲$1.902 billion (2021)
- Total equity: ▲$1.135 billion (2021)
- Number of employees: 716 (2021)

Denbury Inc. was a company engaged in hydrocarbon exploration and extraction via enhanced oil recovery, utilizing carbon dioxide to extract petroleum from fields that have been previously exploited. In November 2023 it was acquired by ExxonMobil.

The company's operations were focused in the Gulf Coast and Rocky Mountain regions. As of December 31, 2021, Denbury had 191.689 million barrels of oil equivalent (1.17273×10^{9} GJ) of estimated proved reserves, of which 98.6% was petroleum and 1.4% was natural gas. The company also had an estimated 910 billion cubic feet of probable carbon dioxide reserves at Jackson Dome. The company's largest producing property was the Cedar Creek Anticline in Montana and North Dakota, which accounted for 23% of production in 2021.

== History ==
In March 1951, the company was incorporated in Manitoba as "Kay Lake Mines Limited (N.P.L.)". In September 1984, the name of the company was changed to "Newscope Resources Limited". In December 1985, the name of the company was changed to "Denbury Resources Inc."

In May 1997, the company became a public company via an initial public offering. In 1998, the company acquired properties from Chevron Corporation for $202 million. In August 1999, the company began its enhanced oil recovery operations with the acquisition of the Little Creek Field.

In 2001, the company acquired Matrix Oil & Gas for $138 million in cash and stock. The company also acquired the Jackson Dome carbon dioxide reserves and the NEJD Pipeline in Mississippi, providing a source of carbon dioxide and the related transportation infrastructure. In 2009, the company sold its assets in the Barnett Shale.

In 2010, the company acquired Encore Acquisition Company in a $4.6 billion transaction.

In 2012, the company acquired Thompson Field in Fort Bend County, Texas for $360 million. The company also sold its acreage in the Bakken Formation to ExxonMobil for $1.6 billion.

In 2013, the company acquired fields in the Cedar Creek Anticline from ConocoPhillips for $1.05 billion.

In 2017, Christian S. Kendall was named chief executive officer of the company. The company also acquired assets in the Salt Creek Field of Wyoming from Linn Energy for $71.5 million.

In July 2020, the company filed for bankruptcy. It emerged from bankruptcy in September 2020 and changed its name to Denbury Inc.

On July 13, 2023, ExxonMobil announced its acquisition of Denbury for $4.9 billion. On November 3, 2023, Exxon completed the acquisition.

== Safety problems ==
In 2007, the Mississippi counties of Amite and Lincoln experienced leaks of CO_{2}, with people in the former having been evacuated.

In 2011, a carbon dioxide pipeline owned by the company had a "blowout" in Tinsley, Mississippi, causing the sickening of one worker and killing deer, fish and birds.

On February 22, 2020, a 24-inch pressurized pipeline carrying liquid carbon dioxide and hydrogen sulfide for carbon capture and utilization ruptured less than half a mile from Satartia, Mississippi. More than 300 people were evacuated and 46 hospitalized with carbon dioxide poisoning. In May 2022, the Pipeline and Hazardous Materials Safety Administration preliminarily assessed a civil penalty of $ 3,866,734. In March 2023, Denbury signed a consent order to reform their safety procedures and response protocols.
