= Bakerhill, Alabama =

- Town
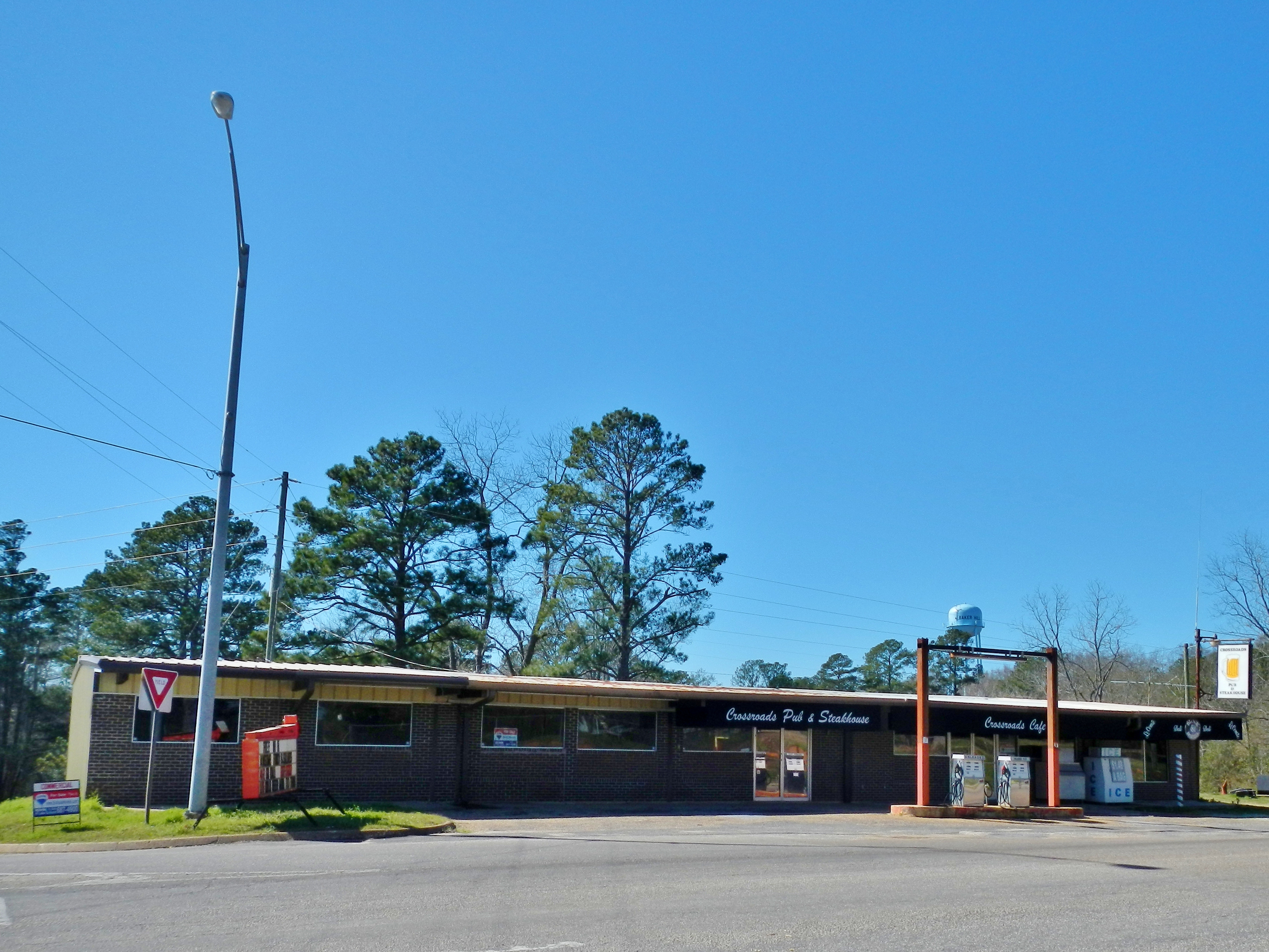
- Bakerhill in 2012

- Location of Bakerhill in Barbour County, Alabama.
- Coordinates: 31°45′43″N 85°18′28″W
- Country: United States
- State: Alabama
- County: Barbour

Government
  - Type: Mayor-Council
  - Mayor: Aaron Grubbs

Area
  - Total: 2.75 sq mi (7.13 km^{2})
  - Land: 2.75 sq mi (7.13 km^{2})
  - Water: 0 sq mi (0.00 km^{2})
- Elevation: 509 ft (155 m)

Population (2020)
  - Total: 211
  - Density: 76.7/sq mi (29.61/km^{2})
- Time zone: UTC-6 (Central (CST))
  - Summer (DST): UTC-5 (CDT)
- Area code: 334
- FIPS code: 01-03724
- GNIS feature ID: 2405200
- Website: https://cityofbakerhill.com/

Bakerhill or Baker Hill is a town in Barbour County, Alabama, United States, near Eufaula. As of the 2020 census, Bakerhill had a population of 211. Although it existed as an unincorporated village since before 1860, the town was officially incorporated in 1997.

Baker Hill is governed by a six-member council include the mayor.

== Geography ==
The surrounding countryside is mostly rolling hills covered in mostly in pine forest. Small-scale logging, as well as bauxite mining and minor livestock raising activities account for most of the local area's business activities. The town also, as of 2009, includes two gas stations as well as a grill & bar and a small, family owned and operated deer processing business. There is also a small feed mill.

The soil is mostly reddish clay and sand. Numerous Native American artifacts have been discovered there.

== Demographics ==
As of the 2020 census, there is only 245 people in the town of Bakerhill. With the median age of being 34 years old. About 78% of the population is white and 22% is black.

== See also ==
- List of towns in Alabama
- Barbour County, Alabama
- Geography of Alabama
