= Avondale (Westminster, Maryland) =

Historic house in Maryland

- U.S. National Register of Historic Places
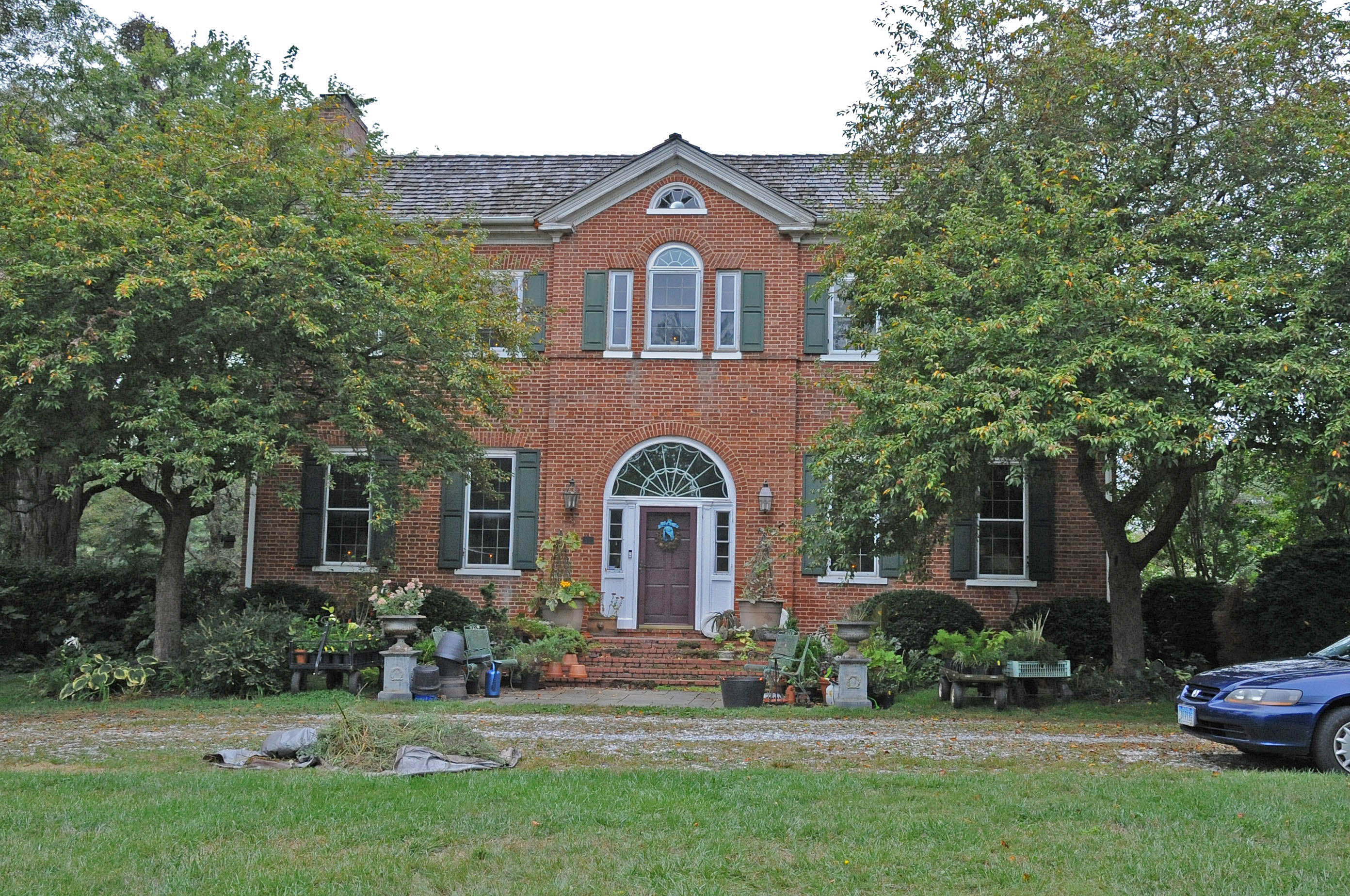

- Location within Maryland Location within the United States
- Location: 501 Stone Chapel Road, Westminster, Maryland
- Coordinates: 39°33′33″N 77°1′49″W
- Area: 8 acres (3.2 ha)
- Built: 1796
- Built by: Masters, Legh
- Architectural style: Georgian
- NRHP reference No.: 75000877
- Added to NRHP: October 10, 1975

Avondale is a historic home located at Westminster, Carroll County, Maryland. It is a Georgian style, 2 1/2-story brick house, measuring approximately 45 feet long by 18 1/2 feet deep, built about 1796. The house has a two-story wing measuring approximately 49 feet long by 13 feet deep. It features a Palladian window centered on the pavilion directly over the entrance door.

It was listed on the National Register of Historic Places in 1975.

An iron foundry was built in the community of Avondale in 1765 by Leigh Master, a settler from New Hall, Lancashire, England, who operated it using slave labor.
