= Finger, North Carolina =

- Unincorporated community
- Location within North Carolina Location within the United States
- Coordinates: 35°23′06″N 80°21′28″W
- Country: United States
- State: North Carolina
- County: Stanly
- Elevation: 630 ft (190 m)
- Time zone: UTC-5 (Eastern (EST))
  - Summer (DST): UTC-4 (EDT)
- Area code: 704
- GNIS feature ID: 1020245

Finger is an unincorporated community in Stanly County, North Carolina, United States.

An EF1 tornado struck Finger on February 6, 2020. A double-wide manufactured home was shifted off its foundation, and its roof was completely removed. A large storage outbuilding was destroyed, and a childcare center had considerable roof damage. Numerous trees were snapped or uprooted.
