= Bon Air, White County, Tennessee =

Unincorporated community in Tennessee, US

Coordinates: 35°56′28″N 85°21′45″W

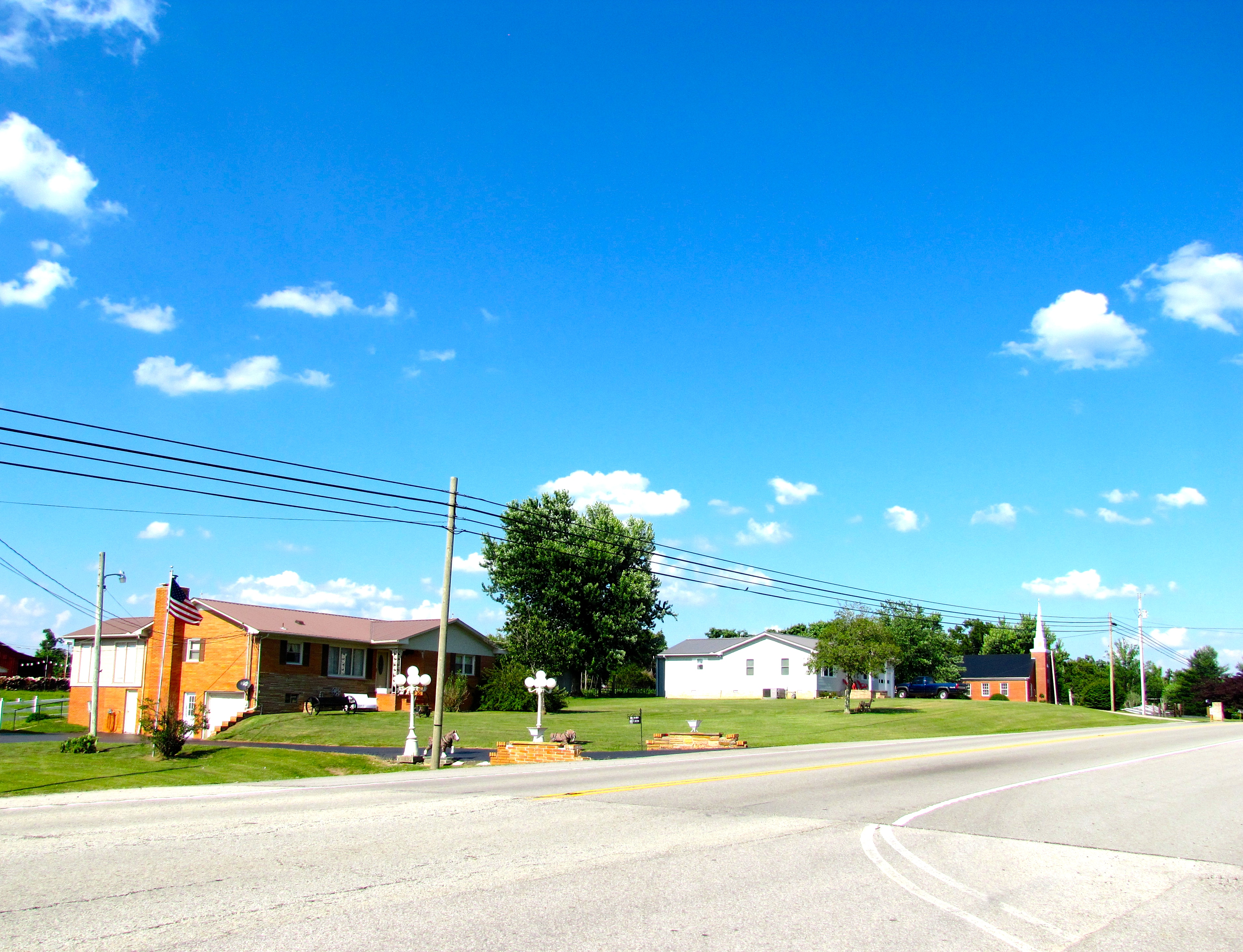
US 70 in Bon Air

Bon Air is an unincorporated community in White County, in the U.S. state of Tennessee. It is concentrated along U.S. Route 70 on the Cumberland Plateau between Sparta and Crossville. Bon Air and the adjacent areas of DeRossett and Ravenscroft form a greater community known as "BonDeCroft."

== History ==
An old variant name is Bon Air Springs. A post office called Bon Air Springs was established in 1840, renamed Bon Air in 1857, and remained in operation until it was discontinued in 1955. The name Bon Air probably refers to "good air".
