= DeRossett, Tennessee =

Unincorporated community in Tennessee, US

Coordinates: 35°57′02″N 85°18′31″W

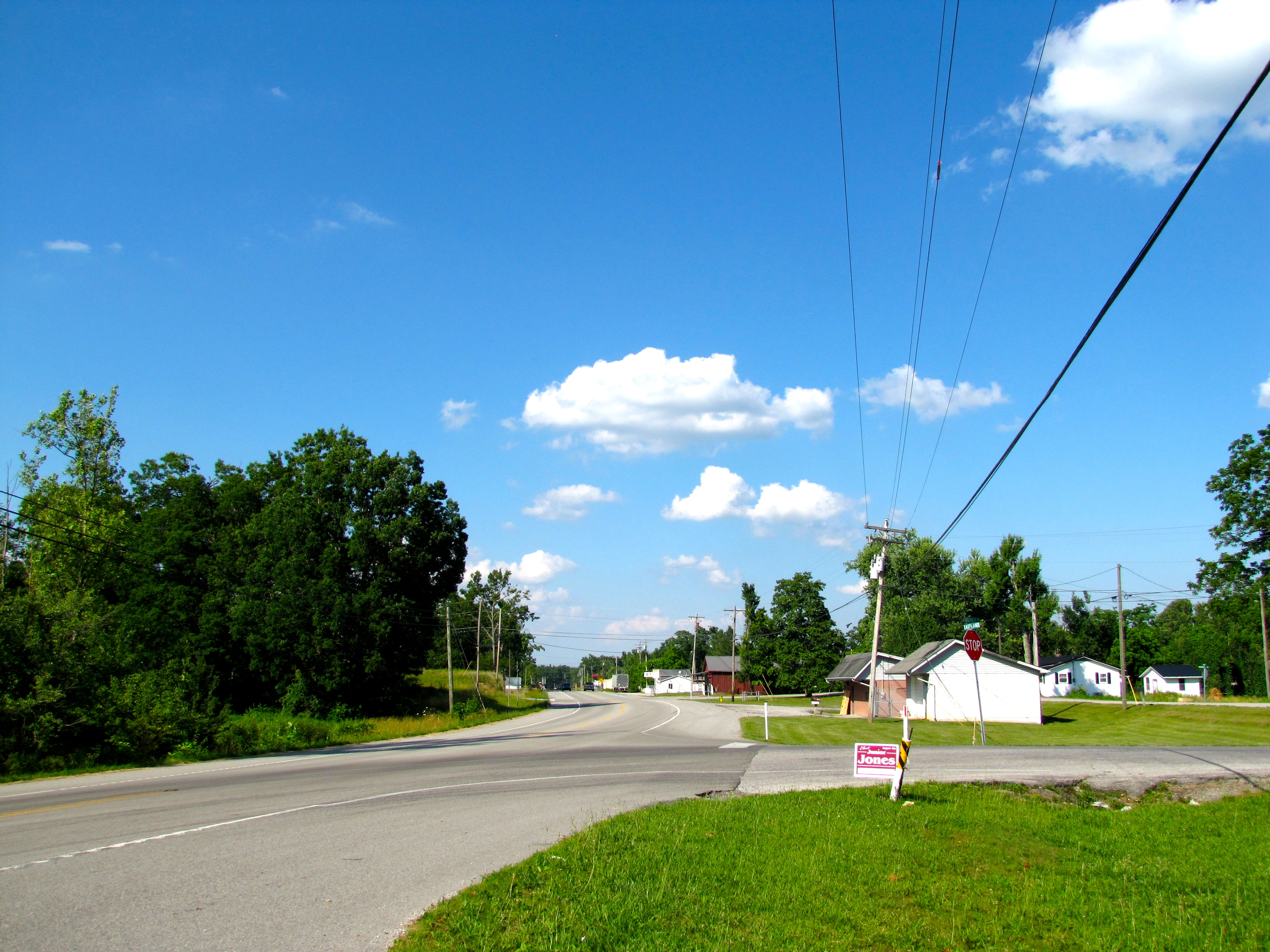
US-70 in DeRossett

DeRossett (also spelled De Rossett) is an unincorporated community in White County, Tennessee, United States. It is concentrated along U.S. Route 70 in White County's Cumberland Plateau region between Sparta and Crossville. Along with the adjacent areas of Bon Air and Ravenscroft, DeRossett is part of a greater community known as "BonDeCroft."
