= Shady Grove, White County, Tennessee =

Shady Grove, Tennessee
- Unincorporated community
- Location within Tennessee Location within the United States
- Coordinates: 35°54′29″N 85°34′37″W
- Country: United States
- State: Tennessee
- County: White
- Elevation: 1,001 ft (305 m)
- Time zone: UTC-6 (Central (CST))
  - Summer (DST): UTC-5 (CDT)
- Area code: 931
- GNIS feature ID: 1315904

Shady Grove is an unincorporated community in White County, Tennessee, United States. Shady Grove is located along Tennessee State Route 136 6.4 miles (10.3 km) west-southwest of Sparta.
