= Crowders, North Carolina =

Crowders, Gastonia
- Neighborhood
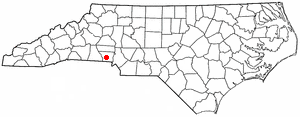
- Location in the U.S. state of North Carolina
- Coordinates: 35°11′10″N 81°12′23″W
- Country: United States
- State: North Carolina
- County: Gaston
- Elevation: 774 ft (236 m)
- Time zone: UTC-5 (Eastern (EST))
  - Summer (DST): UTC-4 (EDT)
- Area code: 704
- FIPS code: 37-15660
- GNIS feature ID: 983803

Crowders is a neighborhood on the southside of Gastonia in Gaston County, North Carolina, United States. It is located approximately 6.0 miles (9.7 km) south of downtown Gastonia on U.S. Route 321 and 3.8 miles (6.1 km) north of the South Carolina state line.
