= Basic, Mississippi =

- Unincorporated community
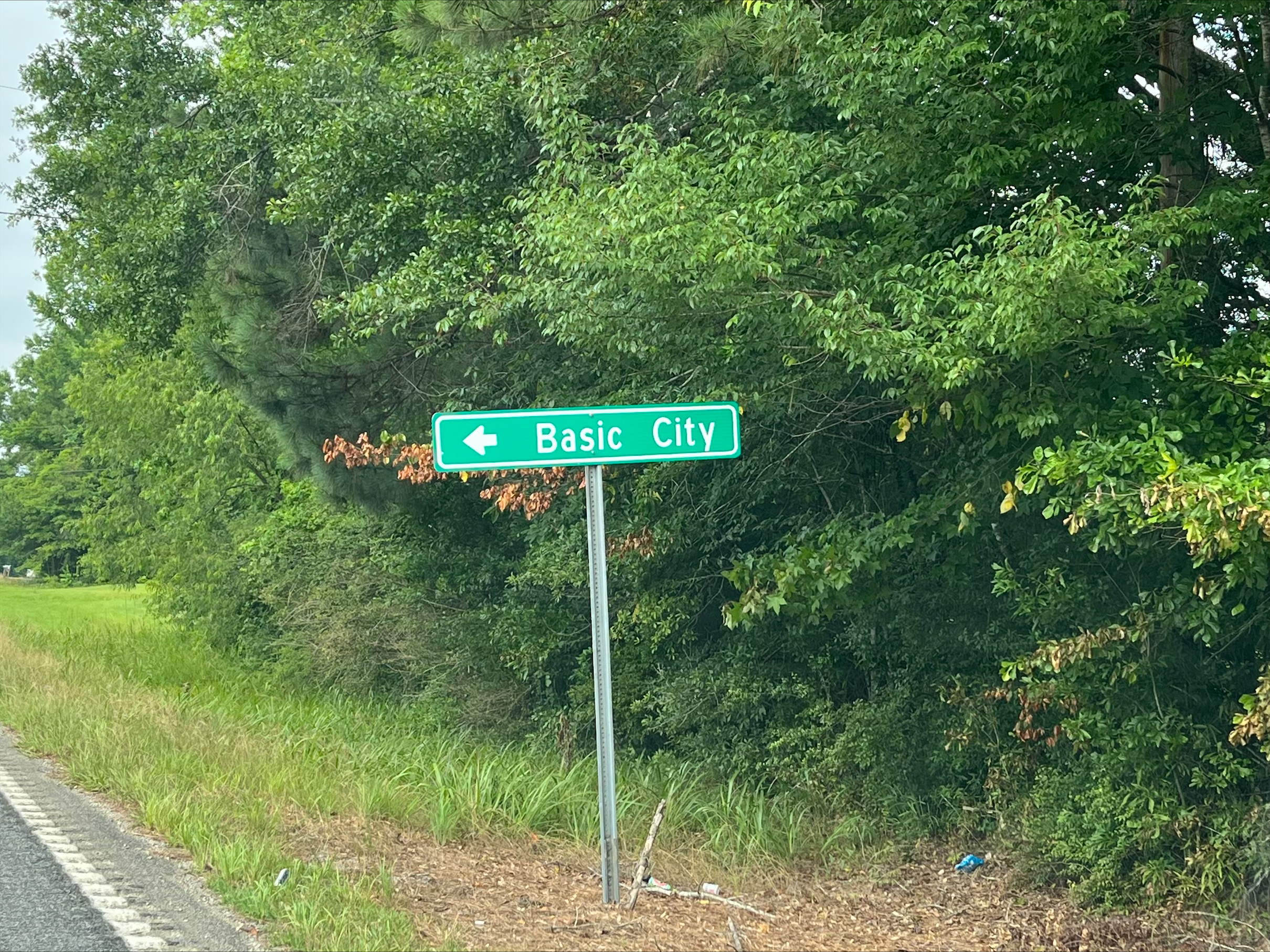

- Location within Mississippi Location within the United States
- Coordinates: 32°13′07″N 88°46′09″W
- Country: United States
- State: Mississippi
- County: Clarke
- Elevation: 269 ft (82 m)
- Time zone: UTC-6 (Central (CST))
  - Summer (DST): UTC-5 (CDT)
- Area codes: 601 & 769
- GNIS feature ID: 666554

Basic is an unincorporated community in Clarke County, Mississippi, United States.

== History ==
Basic is located on the former Mobile and Ohio Railroad and was once home to two sawmills and two general stores.

A post office called Basic was established in 1900, and remained in operation until 1945. A variant name was "Basic City". The origin of the name "Basic" is obscure.

In South and West: From a Notebook, Joan Didion notes that when she visited the town in the 1970s, it was "not on the map."

A member of the Tallahatta Formation known as Basic City Shale is named for Basic.
