= Oil City, Mississippi =

- Unincorporated community
- Location within Mississippi Location within the United States
- Coordinates: 32°41′28″N 90°26′02″W
- Country: United States
- State: Mississippi
- County: Yazoo
- Elevation: 341 ft (104 m)
- Time zone: UTC-6 (Central (CST))
  - Summer (DST): UTC-5 (CDT)
- ZIP code: 39040
- Area code: 662
- GNIS feature ID: 675147

Oil City is an unincorporated community located in Yazoo County, Mississippi. Oil City is approximately 2 miles (3.2 km) west of Anding, 4 miles (6.4 km) south of Tinsley and approximately 8 miles (13 km) northwest of Bentonia.

Oil City has a zip code of 39040.

In 1939, the Tinsley Oil Field was discovered west of the settlement, which prompted a minor oil boom. In Oil City, "streets and commercial buildings" were "sold to optimistic business interests and speculators." However, development never materialized.

Residents are within the Yazoo County School District. Residents are zoned to Yazoo County Middle School and Yazoo County High School.
