= National Register of Historic Places listings in Yazoo County, Mississippi =

Location of Yazoo County in Mississippi

This is a list of the National Register of Historic Places listings in Yazoo County, Mississippi.

This is intended to be a complete list of the properties and districts on the National Register of Historic Places in Yazoo County, Mississippi, United States. Latitude and longitude coordinates are provided for many National Register properties and districts; these locations may be seen together in a map.

There are 16 properties and districts listed on the National Register in the county, including 1 National Historic Landmark.

This National Park Service list is complete through NPS recent listings posted September 26, 2025.

== Current listings ==
	Name on the Register	Image	Date listed	Location	City or town	Description
1	Afro-American Sons and Daughters Hospital	Afro-American Sons and Daughters Hospital	January 24, 2006 (#05001558)	8th St. and Webster Ave. 32°51′22″N 90°24′03″W	Yazoo City	
2	Bull Homestead		January 17, 2002 (#01001479)	13836 Mississippi Highway 16, E. 32°45′58″N 90°10′23″W	Benton	
3	Casey Jones Wreck Site		April 3, 1973 (#73001033)	1 mile north of Vaughan; 32°49′00″N 90°02′07″W	Vaughan vicinity	
4	Deasonville Archeological Site		April 29, 1993 (#93000299)	Address restricted	Deasonville	
5	Fairview Landing (22Yz561)		December 14, 1988 (#88002699)	Address restricted	Holly Bluff	
6	Big John Hart House		July 1, 1993 (#93000580)	Castle Chapel Rd., southeast of Yazoo City; 32°45′20″N 90°22′06″W	Yazoo City vicinity	
7	Holly Bluff Site	Holly Bluff Site	October 15, 1966 (#66000412)	Address restricted	Holly Bluff	
8	Home Place		September 26, 1988 (#88001584)	2 miles east of Mississippi Highway 433, southern side of Midway to Ebeneezer Rd. 32°53′02″N 90°09′40″W	Benton	
9	Lindsey Lawn Apartments		May 13, 2019 (#100003948)	121 Lindsey Lawn Dr., E. 11th St., Calhoun Ave., and neighboring parcels on S 32°51′44″N 90°24′15″W	Yazoo City	
10	Mosely-Woods House	Mosely-Woods House	June 25, 2005 (#05000623)	1461 Bell Rd. 32°49′20″N 90°26′07″W	Yazoo City vicinity	
11	Augustus J. Oakes House	Augustus J. Oakes House	April 8, 1993 (#93000207)	308 Monroe St. 32°50′37″N 90°24′50″W	Yazoo City	
12	Ricks Memorial Library	Ricks Memorial Library	September 18, 1975 (#75001062)	310 N. Main St. 32°50′55″N 90°24′43″W	Yazoo City	
13	Rosedale Plantation		July 20, 2011 (#11000474)	5302 Bend Rd. 32°47′43″N 90°04′03″W	Vaughn vicinity	
14	Shellwood Site (22YZ600)		April 25, 1986 (#86000869)	Address restricted	Lake City	
15	J.W. Woolwine Homes		May 13, 2019 (#100003947)	1900 Gordon Ave., 19th St., and adjacent parcels on the N and E 32°52′25″N 90°24′08″W	Yazoo City	
16	Yazoo City Town Center Historic District	Yazoo City Town Center Historic District	April 16, 1979 (#79001342)	Irregular pattern along Main, Madison, and Broadway Sts. 32°50′46″N 90°24′39″W	Yazoo City	

== See also ==
- List of National Historic Landmarks in Mississippi
- National Register of Historic Places listings in Mississippi
