= Hopewell Landing, Mississippi =

- Unincorporated community
- Location within Mississippi Location within the United States
- Coordinates: 32°40′54″N 90°36′30″W
- Country: United States
- State: Mississippi
- County: Washington
- Elevation: 85 ft (26 m)
- Time zone: UTC-6 (Central (CST))
  - Summer (DST): UTC-5 (CDT)
- Area code: 662
- GNIS feature ID: 692252

Hopewell Landing is an unincorporated community in Yazoo County, Mississippi. It lies at an elevation of 85 feet (26 m).

Located on the Yazoo River, it was noted in the 1870s and 1880s as a steamboat landing.

Residents are within the Yazoo County School District. Residents are zoned to Yazoo County Middle School and Yazoo County High School.
