= Mississippi Highway 432 =

Highway in Mississippi

Mississippi Highway 432

Route information
- Maintained by MDOT
- Length: 16.5 mi (26.6 km)

Major junctions
- West end: MS 433 in Benton
- I-55 near Pickens
- East end: US 51 in Pickens

Location
- Country: United States
- State: Mississippi
- Counties: Yazoo

Highway system
- Mississippi State Highway System; Interstate; US; State
← MS 431	→ MS 433

Mississippi Highway 432 (MS 432) is a highway in Central Mississippi. The western terminus is at MS 433 then it continues east towards Pickens and has an interchange with I-55, The eastern terminus is at US 51 in Pickens.

== Route description ==
MS 432 starts at MS 433 in Benton and heads east through rural forests. MS 432 has an interchange with I-55 (Exit 139) and eventually meets US 51/MS 17 and ends at the two highways, just short of Pickens and the Holmes County line.

== Major intersections ==
The entire route is in Yazoo County.

Location	mi	km	Destinations	Notes
Benton			MS 433 to MS 16 – Yazoo City, Canton	Western terminus
			I-55 – Grenada, Jackson	Interchange; I-55 exit 139
Pickens			US 51 – Goodman, Canton	Eastern terminus
1.000 mi = 1.609 km; 1.000 km = 0.621 mi
