= Mechanicsburg, Mississippi =

- Unincorporated community
- Location within Mississippi Location within the United States
- Coordinates: 32°37′57.50″N 90°30′10.34″W
- Country: United States
- State: Mississippi
- County: Yazoo
- Elevation: 354 ft (108 m)
- Time zone: UTC-6 (Central (CST))
  - Summer (DST): UTC-5 (CDT)
- GNIS feature ID: 692061

Mechanicsburg is an unincorporated community in Yazoo County, Mississippi, United States.

Mechanicsburg is located on Mississippi Highway 433, approximately three miles southeast of Satartia.

In 1906, Mechanicsburg was noted as having "several general stores", and a population of approximately 75.

A historic plaque is located at Mechanicsburg stating that "Mechanicsburg was occupied by contesting forces six times during the Civil War".
