= Midway, Yazoo County, Mississippi =

Midway, Mississippi
- Unincorporated community
- Location within Mississippi Location within the United States
- Coordinates: 32°53′11″N 90°11′32″W
- Country: United States
- State: Mississippi
- County: Yazoo
- Elevation: 322 ft (98 m)
- Time zone: UTC-6 (Central (CST))
  - Summer (DST): UTC-5 (CDT)
- Area code: 662
- GNIS feature ID: 673541

Midway is an unincorporated community in Yazoo County, Mississippi, United States. Midway is located on Mississippi Highway 433 12.6 miles (20.3 km) east-northeast of Yazoo City.

Residents are within the Yazoo County School District. Residents are zoned to Yazoo County Middle School and Yazoo County High School.
