= Kaleb Eulls =

American football player (born 1991)

No. 71
- Position: Defensive tackle

Personal information
- Born: June 28, 1991 (age 35); Yazoo City, Mississippi, U.S.
- Listed height: 6 ft 4 in (1.93 m)
- Listed weight: 295 lb (134 kg)

Career information
- High school: Yazoo County (Yazoo County, Mississippi)
- College: Mississippi State
- NFL draft: 2015: undrafted

Career history
- New Orleans Saints (2015); San Diego / Los Angeles Chargers (2016–2017); Jacksonville Jaguars (2018)
- Stats at Pro Football Reference

Kaleb Lashun Eulls (born June 28, 1991) is an American former football defensive tackle. He played college football at Mississippi State

Eulls attended Yazoo County High School in Mississippi, where he was rated a four-star recruit as a defensive end. He also played quarterback. While in high school, Eulls was lauded as a national hero for disarming a student who brought a gun onto a school bus.

Eulls played college football for Mississippi State, where he started all 52 games he played in 2011, 2012, 2013, and 2014, usually at defensive tackle. Eulls was named to the SEC-All Freshman team in 2011.

== Professional career ==
=== New Orleans Saints ===
Eulls signed with the New Orleans Saints as an undrafted free agent in 2015. He played defensive tackle in 2015 and converted to offensive lineman in the 2016 offseason with the Saints. He was released by the Saints on August 29, 2016.

=== San Diego / Los Angeles Chargers ===
On September 4, 2016, Eulls was signed to the San Diego Chargers' practice squad. He was released on October 4, 2016. He was re-signed to the practice squad on November 21, 2016. He was promoted to the active roster on December 14, 2016.

On September 2, 2017, Eulls was waived/injured by the Chargers and placed on injured reserve.

=== Jacksonville Jaguars ===
On July 30, 2018, Eulls signed with the Jacksonville Jaguars. He was waived/injured on August 3, 2018, and was placed on injured reserve. He was released on November 13, 2018.
