= Henry Craytin =

Henry Craytin was a state legislator in Mississippi. He represented Yazoo County in 1880 and 1881. Spellings of his surname vary. According to a newspaper account he was elected on a Fusion ticket in a deal with Democrats. He was criticized for supporting Ulysses S. Grant for president.
