= Rosedale Plantation =

Historic house in Mississippi, United States

- U.S. National Register of Historic Places
- NRHP reference No.: 11000474

The Rosedale Plantation is a plantation in Vaughn, Yazoo County, Mississippi. The Victorian cottage is 3000 square feet.

== History ==
The cottage was built circa 1870 for Milton Cyrus Ewing and his wife, Augusta Anderson. It burned down in 1891, but it was rebuilt shortly after with pine lumber Ewing ordered from J. J. White of Columbia.

The exterior remains the same nowadays except for its roof which was reshingled in 2010.

== Heritage significance ==
It has been listed on the National Register of Historic Places since July 20, 2011.
