= Lloyd Tevis Miller =

American physician (1872–1951)

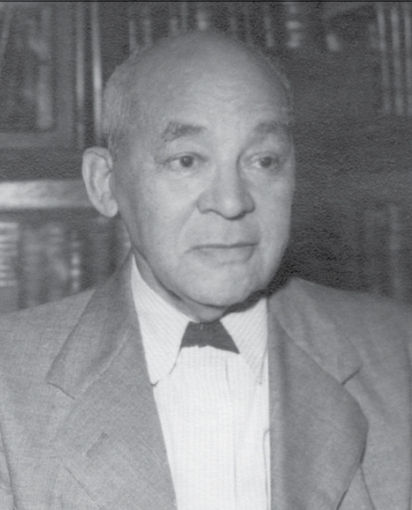
- Miller in January 1950
- Born: December 6, 1872; Natchez, Mississippi, U.S.
- Died: March 8, 1951 (aged 78)
- Known for: Medical Director of Afro-American Sons and Daughters Hospital (1928–1951), Co-founder of Mississippi Medical and Surgical Association
- Scientific career
- Fields: General surgery
- Institutions: Afro-American Sons and Daughters Hospital

Lloyd Tevis Miller (December 6, 1872 – March 8, 1951) was an American physician who was the first medical director of the Afro-American Hospital in Yazoo City, Mississippi, the first private hospital for blacks in the state. He was also a co-founder of the Mississippi Medical and Surgical Association.

== Early life and education ==
Miller was born in Natchez, Mississippi on December 6, 1872, the son of Washington Miller, a hackman (or cabdriver) and his wife, Emily, who worked at the Melrose Mansion in Natchez. He parents sent him to St. Louis for high school. He returned home for undergraduate studies and received his bachelor's degree from Natchez College. In 1893, he received his MD from Meharry Medical College in Nashville, Tennessee. As a result of financial support from Howard Coast, the white owner of a mercantile store in Yazoo City, he was encouraged to establish his practice in the wealthy cotton town.

== Career ==
In 1900, Miller was a co-founder with a dozen other doctors of the Mississippi Medical and Surgical Association (MMSA), the state's largest and oldest organization representing African American health professionals.

In 1928, Miller along with local businessman T. J. Huddleston Sr. established the Afro-American Hospital in Yazoo City to provide medical services for members of the Afro-American Sons and Daughters, a statewide fraternal insurance organization that provided death and hospitalization benefits to its members. Miller was chosen as the hospital's first medical director. While the facility's mission was primarily to service its members, it was also available to the general public on a fee for service basis. Given the dearth of quality health care facilities available to blacks at the time, the hospital serviced not only individuals from Yazoo City and the Delta region, but other parts of Mississippi and the South as well. Miller recruited Robert Elliott Fullilove and three registered nurses to complete his staff. During its heyday in the 1930s and 1940s, the facility also operated a state licensed nursing school. By 1950, the hospital had grown to a capacity of 104 beds.

In 1933, his discovery of a lithopaedion while performing surgery to remove a tumor was reported in the media.

Miller suffered a stroke on December 17, 1950, and died on March 8, 1951. Fullilove succeeded Miller as medical director.

== Notes ==
Miller's World War I draft card lists his date of birth as December 6, 1874. The 1900 U.S. Census lists his birth as December 1872. The 1880 U.S. Census lists his age as seven, suggesting that December 6, 1872 is the correct birthdate.
