= Bill Luckett (businessman) =

American politician and attorney (1948–2021)

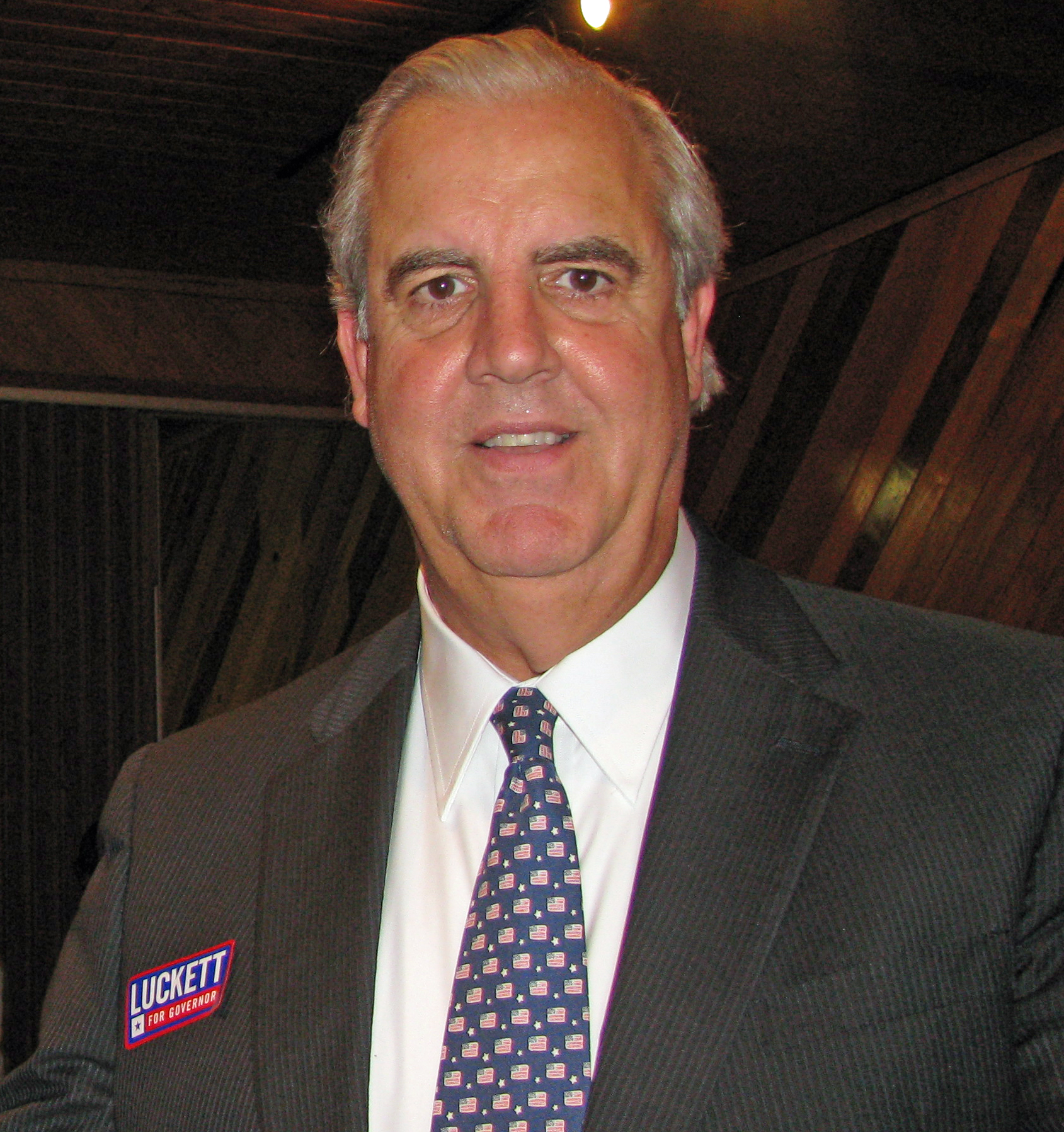

Mayor of Clarksdale
- In office 2013–2017
- Preceded by: Henry Espy
- Succeeded by: Chuck Espy

Personal details
- Born: William Oliver Luckett Jr. March 17, 1948 Fort Worth, Texas, U.S.
- Died: October 28, 2021 (aged 73) Oxford, Mississippi, U.S.
- Party: Democratic
- Spouse: Francine Luckett
- Children: 4, including Oliver
- Education: University of Virginia; University of Mississippi

Military service
- Allegiance: United States
- Branch/service: Mississippi National Guard

William Oliver Luckett Jr. (March 17, 1948 – October 28, 2021) was an American politician, attorney, actor and businessman.

== Early life ==
Luckett was born in Fort Worth, Texas and grew up in Clarksdale, Mississippi. He had lived in Mississippi since he was six weeks old. His father was a lawyer. Luckett was also the great-nephew of Semmes Luckett, who in 1954 argued in favor of segregation against Thurgood Marshall in the landmark Brown v. Board of Education of Topeka, Kansas case.

== Education and military service ==
Luckett graduated from Clarksdale High School in 1966. Luckett also graduated from the University of Virginia and earned a Juris Doctor degree at the University of Mississippi. He graduated from the latter university in 1973. He also served in the Mississippi National Guard from 1971 to 1979. He received an honorary degree from Coahoma Community College in May 2002. He was also inducted into the Living Legends of Aviation in 2009.

== Career ==
=== Film career ===
He has acted in the films Texas Heart (2016), Battlecreek (2017), The Poison Rose (2019), Vanquish (2021) and Paradise Highway (2022).

According to Luckett, he and actor Morgan Freeman had been best friends for “25 years.”

=== Businesses ===
Luckett co-owned the Madidi Restaurant with Freeman from 2001 to 2012. From May 2001 till his death, Luckett also co-owned with Freeman the Ground Zero Blues Club.

=== Political career ===
He unsuccessfully ran for Governor of Mississippi in 2011 and served as Mayor of Clarksdale, Mississippi from 2013 to 2017.

Luckett was also considered a mentor to consultant Burns Strider, who worked on Luckett’s gubernatorial campaign.

=== Legal career ===
Luckett practiced law with Luckett Tyner Law Firm, P.A. as a member of The Mississippi Bar and the Tennessee Bar Association.

=== Other work ===
Luckett was a founder and board member of the Pinetop Perkins Foundation. He was also a member of the NAACP.

== Personal life ==
Luckett was married to Francine Luckett from 1984 until his death and was the father of four children. One of his sons is Oliver Luckett. Luckett attended St. George's Episcopal Church in Clarksdale.

== Death ==
Luckett died on October 28, 2021 in Oxford, Mississippi, one year after being diagnosed with cancer.
