= Ben Beckwith =

American football player (born 1991)

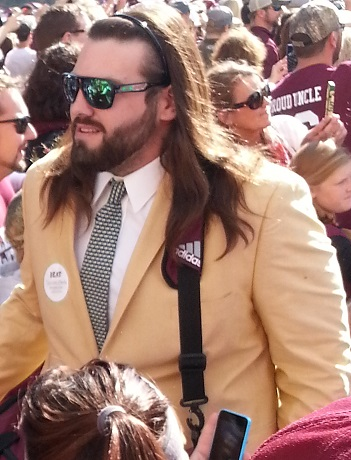
- Beckwith in 2014

No. 66
- Position: Guard

Personal information
- Born: December 27, 1991 (age 34); Flowood, Mississippi, U.S.
- Listed height: 6 ft 3 in (1.91 m)
- Listed weight: 306 lb (139 kg)

Career information
- High school: Benton (MS) Academy
- College: Mississippi State
- NFL draft: 2015: undrafted

Career history
- San Diego Chargers (2015)

Awards and highlights
- First-team All-SEC (2014)
- Stats at Pro Football Reference

Benjamin Wyatt Beckwith (born December 27, 1991) is an American former football guard. He played college football for Mississippi State, where he began his career as a walk-on, but wound up starting in the 2013 and 2014 seasons. 2015 East-West Shrine Game Participant, 2014 Burlsworth Trophy Finalist, 2014 Third-Team All-American (Associated Press), 2014 First-Team All-SEC (Associated Press, ESPN.com), 2014 Second-Team All-SEC (Coaches), 2014 SEC Offensive Lineman of Week (at LSU; vs. Texas A&M; vs. Vanderbilt) He has been a member of the San Diego Chargers of the National Football League (NFL).

== Professional career ==
After going unselected in the 2015 NFL draft, Beckwith signed with the San Diego Chargers on May 3, 2015.

On January 2, 2017, Beckwith was waived by the Chargers.
