= Hilton, Mississippi =

- Ghost town
- Location within the state of Mississippi
- Coordinates: 32°50′10″N 90°20′00″W
- Country: United States
- State: Mississippi
- County: Yazoo
- Elevation: 344 ft (105 m)
- Time zone: UTC-6 (Central (CST))
  - Summer (DST): UTC-5 (CDT)
- GNIS feature ID: 686671

Hilton is a ghost town in Yazoo County, Mississippi, United States.

Hilton had a post office. The population was 27 in 1900, and had grown to about 40 by 1906.
