= Claibornesville, Mississippi =

- Ghost town
- Location within the state of Mississippi
- Coordinates: 32°36′05″N 90°32′10″W
- Country: United States
- State: Mississippi
- County: Yazoo
- Elevation: 312 ft (95 m)
- Time zone: UTC-6 (Central (CST))
  - Summer (DST): UTC-5 (CDT)
- GNIS feature ID: 686661

Claibornesville is a ghost town in Yazoo County, Mississippi, United States.

Claibornesville had a post office as early as 1846.

A comical short-story set in Claibornesville, entitled Mike Hooter's Fight With The Panther: A Yazoo Sketch, written by Thomas Chandler Haliburton as Sam Slick, was published in The Sydney Morning Herald in 1854.
