= Alexander Hollins =

American gridiron football player (born 1996)

- Hollins with the Montreal Alouettes in 2026

Personal information
- Born: November 24, 1996 (age 29); Yazoo City, Mississippi, U.S.
- Listed height: 6 ft 0 in (1.83 m)
- Listed weight: 170 lb (77 kg)

Career information
- Position: Wide receiver (No. 85,83,13,15)
- High school: Yazoo County
- College: Eastern Illinois
- NFL draft: 2019: undrafted

Career history
- Minnesota Vikings (2019–2020); Cleveland Browns (2020–2021); BC Lions (2022–2024); Edmonton Elks (2025)*; Montreal Alouettes (2025–2026)
- * Offseason or practice squad member only

Awards and highlights
- CFL West All-Star (2023); FCS All-American (2018); First-team All-OVC (2018)

Career NFL statistics
- Games played: 5
- Receptions: 2
- Receiving yards: 46
- Receiving touchdowns: 0
- Stats at Pro Football Reference

Career CFL statistics as of 2026
- Games played: 58
- Targets: 307
- Receptions: 192
- Receiving yards: 2,851
- Receiving touchdowns: 19
- Stats at CFL.ca

Alexander Hollins (born November 24, 1996) is an American former professional football wide receiver who played in eight seasons between the National Football League (NFL) the Canadian Football League (CFL). Hollins played for the Minnesota Vikings, Cleveland Browns, BC Lions, and Montreal Alouettes. He payed college football for Eastern Illinois.

== Early life ==
Hollins grew up in Yazoo City, Mississippi, and attended Yazoo County High School. As a senior, he had 64 receptions for 1,346 yards and 15 touchdowns.

== College career ==
Hollins began his collegiate career at Copiah–Lincoln Community College. He caught 11 passes for 214 yards and three touchdowns as a sophomore before transferring to Eastern Illinois University for the final two years of his NCAA eligibility.

In his first season with the Panthers, Hollins led the team with 47 receptions for 694 yards and seven touchdowns. As a senior, he caught 80 passes for 1,102 yards and 16 touchdowns and was named first-team All-Ohio Valley Conference. Hollins had 127 receptions, 1,796 yards and 23 touchdowns in 22 games at Eastern Illinois.

== Professional career ==
Pre-draft measurables
Height	Weight	Arm length	Hand span	Wingspan	40-yard dash	10-yard split	20-yard split	20-yard shuttle	Three-cone drill	Vertical jump	Broad jump	Bench press
5 ft 11 3/4 in (1.82 m)	165 lb (75 kg)	30 1/4 in (0.77 m)	8 1/2 in (0.22 m)	6 ft 1 1/4 in (1.86 m)	4.49 s	1.59 s	2.53 s	4.18 s	6.89 s	37.0 in (0.94 m)	10 ft 8 in (3.25 m)	5 reps
All values from Pro Day

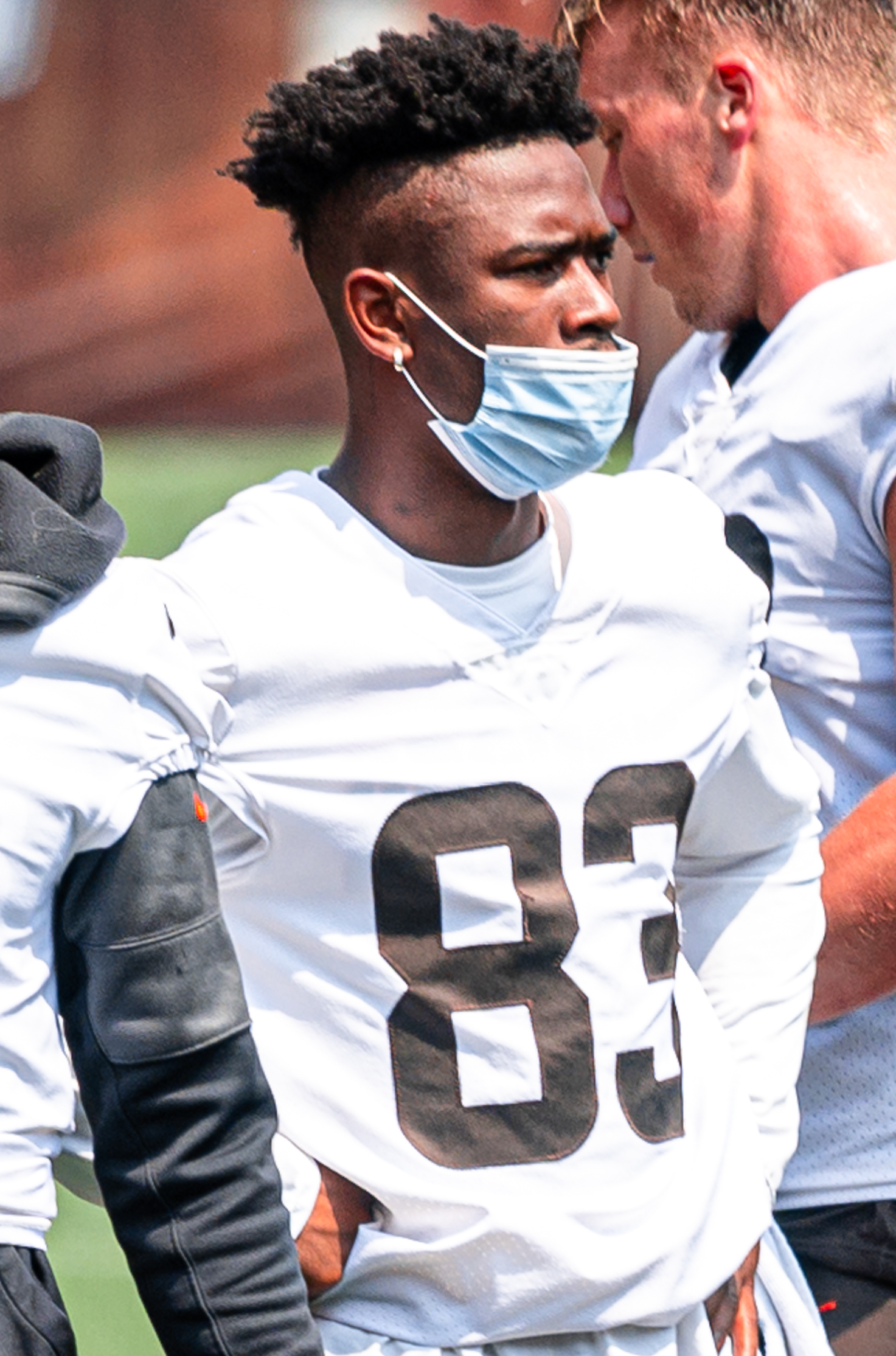
Hollins with the Cleveland Browns in 2021

=== Minnesota Vikings ===
Hollins signed with the Minnesota Vikings as an undrafted free agent on April 29, 2019. He was waived by the team at the end of training camp during final roster cuts. Hollins was re-signed by the Vikings to their practice squad on September 12, 2019. Hollins was promoted to the Vikings active roster on December 2, 2019. Hollins played in four games as a rookie and caught two passes for 46 yards in the Vikings' final regular season game against the Chicago Bears.

Hollins was waived by the Vikings on September 5, 2020, and signed to the practice squad the next day.

=== Cleveland Browns ===
Hollins was signed off the Vikings' practice squad to the Cleveland Browns' active roster on December 28, 2020. The Browns waived Hollins on August 23, 2021. He was re-signed to the practice squad on December 15, 2021. The Browns waived Hollins off their practice squad on December 21, 2021.

=== BC Lions ===
Hollins signed with the BC Lions of the Canadian Football League (CFL) on March 1, 2022. He made his CFL debut on October 8, 2022, where he had three catches for 47 yards and one touchdown against the Toronto Argonauts. He played and started in four regular season games where he had 13 receptions for 117 yards and one touchdown. He made his post-season debut in the West Semi-Final victory over the Calgary Stampeders and played in playoff games, recording eight catches for 102 yards and a touchdown.

In 2023, Hollins won a starting role in training camp and had a breakout season. He played and started in all 18 regular season games where he had 78 catches for 1,173 yards and nine touchdowns. At season's end, he was named a CFL West All-Star.

In the first six games of the 2024 season, Hollins had 38 receptions for 656 yards and four touchdowns. However, following an injury and demotion of quarterback Vernon Adams, Hollins struggled to maintain his outstanding production and finished the season with 61 catches for 937 yards and six touchdowns in 16 games played. In the West Semi-Final, he had two receptions for 16 yards. With one year remaining on his contract, he was released on January 30, 2025.

=== Edmonton Elks ===
On April 28, 2025, it was announced that Hollins had signed with the Edmonton Elks. However, he was released on June 1, 2025.

=== Montreal Alouettes ===
On July 1, 2025, it was announced that Hollins had signed with the Montreal Alouettes. He played in five games during the 2025 season where he had eight catches for 163 yards. On January 5, 2026, Hollins signed a one-year extension with the Alouettes. In 2026, he played in 15 regular season games and recorded 32 catches for 461 yards and three touchdowns. He announced his retirement on November 18, 2026.
