= Orlando Paden =

American politician

Mayor of Clarksdale, Mississippi
- Incumbent
- Assumed office June 30, 2025
- Preceded by: Chuck Espy

Member of the Mississippi House of Representatives from the 26th district
- In office January 5, 2016 – June 30, 2025
- Preceded by: Chuck Espy
- Succeeded by: Otha Williams

Personal details
- Born: June 5, 1984 (age 42) Clarksdale, Mississippi, U.S.
- Party: Democratic
- Education: Coahoma Community College (AAS); Alcorn State University (BA)

Orlando W. Paden (born June 5, 1984) is an American politician who is the current mayor of Clarksdale, Mississippi. He previously served as a member of the Mississippi House of Representatives from the 26th district. He assumed office on January 5, 2016 and served until June 30, 2025.

== Early life and education ==
Paden was born in Clarksdale, Mississippi. He earned an Associate of Arts and Sciences in social sciences from Coahoma Community College and a Bachelor of Arts in political science from Alcorn State University.

== Career ==
Since 2007, Paden has worked as a Federal Work-Study Program coordinator at Coahoma Community College. He was elected to the Mississippi House of Representatives and assumed office on January 5, 2016.

Paden was elected as mayor of Clarksdale on June 3, 2025.

== Mayor of Clarksdale ==
On June 30, 2025, Paden was officially sworn in as Mayor of Clarksdale.
