= David R. Bowen =

American politician

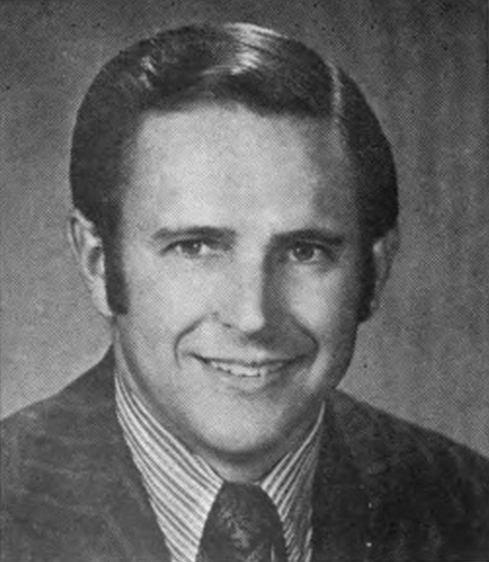

Member of the U.S. House of Representatives from Mississippi's 2nd district
- In office January 3, 1973 – January 3, 1983
- Preceded by: Thomas Abernethy (redistricted)
- Succeeded by: Webb Franklin

Personal details
- Born: David Reece Bowen; October 21, 1932 (age 93) Houston, Mississippi, U.S.
- Party: Democratic
- Education: University of Missouri; Harvard University (BA); New College, Oxford (MA)

Military service
- Allegiance: United States
- Branch/service: United States Army
- Years of service: 1957–1958
- Rank: Private (first class)

David Reece Bowen III (born October 21, 1932) is an American politician and educator from Mississippi who served as a member of the United States House of Representatives representing Mississippi's 2nd congressional district for five terms from 1973 to 1983. He is a member of the Democratic Party.

== Biography ==
Born in Houston, Mississippi, Bowen was graduated from Cleveland High School in Cleveland, Mississippi, in 1950. He attended the University of Missouri from 1950 to 1952 before graduating from Harvard University in 1954.

=== Military service ===
After receiving a Master of Arts degree at the University of Oxford in Oxford, England, in 1956, Bowen enlisted in the United States Army, serving as a private first class from 1957 to 1958.

=== Early career ===
He served as assistant professor of political science and history at Mississippi College from 1958 to 1959 and Millsaps College from 1959 to 1964. He was employed by the U.S. Office of Economic Opportunity from 1966 to 1967, the U.S. Chamber of Commerce from 1967 to 1968, and was first coordinator of federal-state programs at the State of Mississippi from 1968 to 1972.

=== Congress ===
Bowen was elected as a Democrat to the Ninety-third and to the four succeeding Congresses (January 3, 1973 – January 3, 1983). He was not a candidate for reelection in 1982 to the Ninety-eighth Congress.

=== Later career ===
After retiring from Congress, Bowen served as a visiting lecturer at Mississippi State University from 1985 to 1987.

U.S. House of Representatives
Preceded by Thomas G. Abernethy	Member of the U.S. House of Representatives from Mississippi's 2nd congressional district 1973–1983	Succeeded by Webb Franklin
U.S. order of precedence (ceremonial)
Preceded by Baron Hill as Former U.S. Representative	Order of precedence of the United States as Former U.S. Representative	Succeeded by Michael Parker as Former U.S. Representative
