= Phoenix, Mississippi =

- Unincorporated community
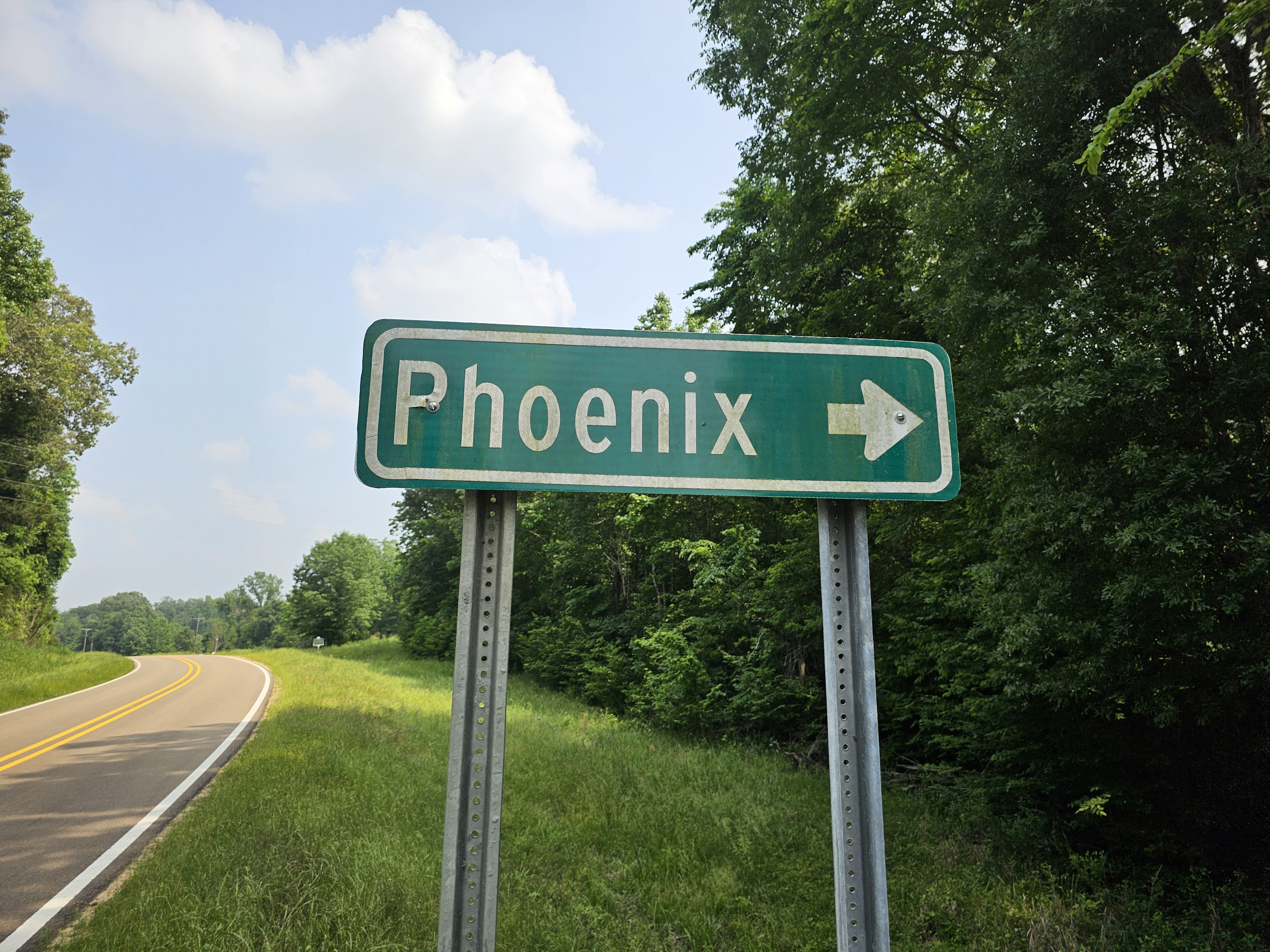
- Sign outside of Phoenix

- Location within Mississippi Location within the United States
- Coordinates: 32°34′52.50″N 90°33′46.35″W
- Country: United States
- State: Mississippi
- County: Yazoo
- Elevation: 351 ft (107 m)
- Time zone: UTC-6 (Central (CST))
  - Summer (DST): UTC-5 (CDT)
- Area code: 662
- GNIS feature ID: 690987

Phoenix is an unincorporated community in Yazoo County, Mississippi, United States. The community is at the intersection of Hebron Church Road and Mechanicsburg Road, 21 miles (34 km) south-southwest of Yazoo City.
