= Webb Franklin =

American politician

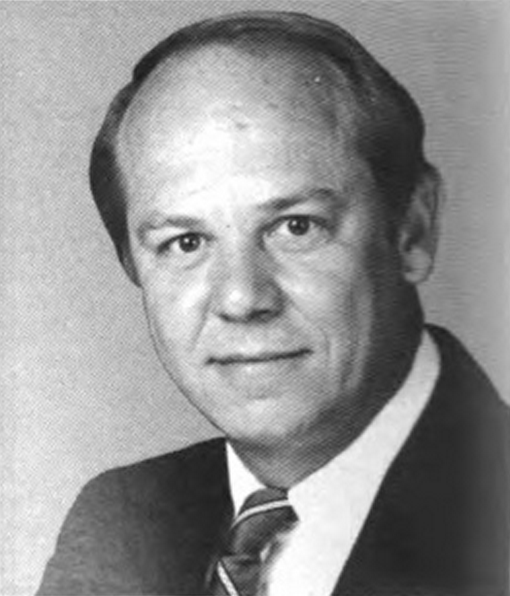

Member of the U.S. House of Representatives from Mississippi's 2nd district
- In office January 3, 1983 – January 3, 1987
- Preceded by: David R. Bowen
- Succeeded by: Mike Espy

Personal details
- Born: William Webster Franklin; December 13, 1941 (age 84) Greenwood, Mississippi, U.S.
- Party: Republican
- Education: Mississippi State University (BA); University of Mississippi (LLB)

Military service
- Allegiance: United States
- Branch/service: United States Army
- Years of service: 1963–1970
- Rank: Major
- Unit: Army Judge Advocate General's Corps

William Webster Franklin (born December 13, 1941) is an American lawyer, politician, and jurist from Mississippi. As a Republican, he served in the United States House of Representatives representing Mississippi's 2nd congressional district from 1983 to 1987.

== Biography ==
Born in Greenwood in Leflore County on the eastern edge of the Mississippi Delta, Franklin graduated from Greenwood High School. In 1963, he received a Bachelor of Arts degree from Mississippi State University at Starkville. In 1966, he received his Bachelor of Laws from the University of Mississippi School of Law at Oxford (later converted to a Juris Doctor) and was admitted to the bar.

=== Military legal career ===
He attended The JAG School at the University of Virginia and entered U.S. Army JAG Corps. From 1963 to 1970, he was a major in the United States Army. In 1966, he was a member of the Army's Judge Advocate General's Corps.

=== Law practice and judicial career ===
Franklin practiced law in Greenwood from 1970 to 1972, when he became an assistant district attorney for the state Fourth Circuit District Court.

In 1978, he was elected circuit judge for the Fourth District and remained in that office until 1982.

=== Congress ===
In 1983, he began his first of two terms in Congress. He was defeated in 1986 in his bid for a third term by African-American Democrat Mike Espy.

=== Later career ===
Upon leaving the U.S. House, Franklin returned to Greenwood to practice law.

U.S. House of Representatives
Preceded by David R. Bowen	Member of the U.S. House of Representatives from Mississippi's 2nd congressional district 1983–1987	Succeeded by Mike Espy
U.S. order of precedence (ceremonial)
Preceded by Brad Ellsworth as Former U.S. Representative	Order of precedence of the United States as Former U.S. Representative	Succeeded by Ronnie Shows as Former U.S. Representative
