= Mississippi Highway 433 =

State Highway in Mississippi

Mississippi Highway 433

Route information
- Existed: 1956–present

Western segment
- Length: 10.586 mi (17.037 km)
- South end: US 61 near Valley Park
- North end: Ten Mile Road / Spanish Fort Road near Valley Park

Eastern segment
- Length: 45.278 mi (72.868 km)
- South end: Satartia Road in Satartia
- Major intersections: MS 3 near Satartia; US 49 in Bentonia; MS 16 in Benton
- North end: Ebenezer Coxburg Road near Ebenezer

Location
- Country: United States
- State: Mississippi
- Counties: Sharkey, Yazoo, Holmes

Highway system
- Mississippi State Highway System; Interstate; US; State
← MS 432	→ MS 434

Mississippi Highway 433 (MS 433) is a state highway in western Mississippi consisting of two segments. The western segment, running entirely in Sharkey County is unsigned and runs for about 10.5 miles (16.9 km). The eastern segment, at a length of 45.3 miles (72.9 km), runs from Satartia in Yazoo County to rural Holmes County.

== Route description ==
The western segment of MS 433 begins in rural southern Sharkey County at U.S. Route 61 (US 61). The highway heads north on Omega Road crossing Deer Creek at a culvert. After it passes the one house located along this portion of the road, the poorly maintained asphalt surface becomes a dirt road. After about 0.7 miles (1.1 km), the highway turns onto Dummy Line Road, again with a dirt surface. Heading east northeast, the highway crosses Little Sunflower River and enters Delta National Forest. Curving to the northeast, the road continues through woods before this segment of MS 433 ends at the intersection of Spanish Fort Road and Ten Mile Road. This segment of MS 433 is not signed and is not maintained by the state.

The signed eastern segment begins in town of Satartia just shy of the Satartia Lift Bridge. MS 433 heads east on Plum Street, then southeast on Richards Avenue. After crossing MS 3, the road leaves the flat agricultural area of the Mississippi Delta region to a wooded hilly area. The highway passes through the community of Mechanicsburg while in the wooded area of southern Yazoo County. The terrain of the highway flattens out as it enters the town of Bentonia where it intersects US 49 in the western portion of the town. MS 433 continues into town on Wilson Street before sharply curving to the south onto West Railroad Avenue. At Cannon Avenue, Mississippi Highway 830, MS 433 turns east to form a concurrency with MS 830. After crossing a railroad, MS 830 heads north along East Railroad Avenue while MS 433 continues northeast. MS 433 continues its northeasterly course through mostly farm fields, passing through the community of Myrlesville before turning north. In the community of Benton, MS 433 intersects MS 16 south of the community center. In the center, MS 433 turns to the east at Old Highway 16. Heading northeast, the highway intersects MS 432 at its western terminus. In the northern part of the county, MS 433 passes through the community of Midway. After crossing into Holmes County, the highway passes through Zeiglerville. The highway ends at an intersection with Ebenezer Coxburg Road.

== History ==
MS 433 first appeared in the 1956 state highway map running from Satartia to MS 17 south of Lexington. Within the next year, it was extended from its southern terminus west to MS 16 in Holly Bluff. By 1960, the route was truncated at its north end at MS 14 near Ebenezer but was extended further south from Holly Bluff to US 61 in southern Sharkey County. In 1963, the segment between Holly Bluff and Satartia was deleted while the western segment was removed from state maintenance between 1965 and 1967. The route has generally remained unchanged since.

== Major junctions ==
County	Location	mi	km	Destinations	Notes
Sharkey		0.000	0.000	US 61	Southern terminus of western segment
Sharkey		10.586	17.037	Spanish Fort Road / Ten Mile Road	Northern terminus of western segment
Gap in route
Yazoo	Satartia	10.586	17.037	Satartia Road	Southern terminus of eastern segment
Yazoo		11.085	17.840	MS 3 – Redwood, Yazoo City	
Yazoo	Bentonia	23.187	37.316	US 49 – Yazoo City, Jackson	
Yazoo	Bentonia	23.717	38.169	MS 830 east (Cannon Avenue)	Southern end of MS 830 concurrency
Yazoo	Bentonia	23.763	38.243	MS 830 west (East Railroad Avenue)	Northern end of MS 830 concurrency
Yazoo	Benton	39.808	64.065	MS 16 – Yazoo City, Canton	
Yazoo	Benton	42.055	67.681	MS 432 east to I-55 – Pickens	Western terminus of MS 432
Holmes		55.864	89.904	Ebenezer Coxburg Road – Coxburg, Lexington, Ebenezer	Northern terminus of eastern segment
1.000 mi = 1.609 km; 1.000 km = 0.621 mi: Concurrency terminus
