= Pearce, Mississippi =

- Ghost town
- Location within the state of Mississippi
- Coordinates: 32°53′28″N 90°20′40″W
- Country: United States
- State: Mississippi
- County: Yazoo
- Elevation: 299 ft (91 m)
- Time zone: UTC-6 (Central (CST))
  - Summer (DST): UTC-5 (CDT)
- GNIS feature ID: 686681

Pearce is a ghost town in Yazoo County, Mississippi, United States.

Pearce had a post office. The population in 1906 was about 30.
