= Augustus J. Oakes House =

Historic house in Mississippi, United States

- U.S. National Register of Historic Places
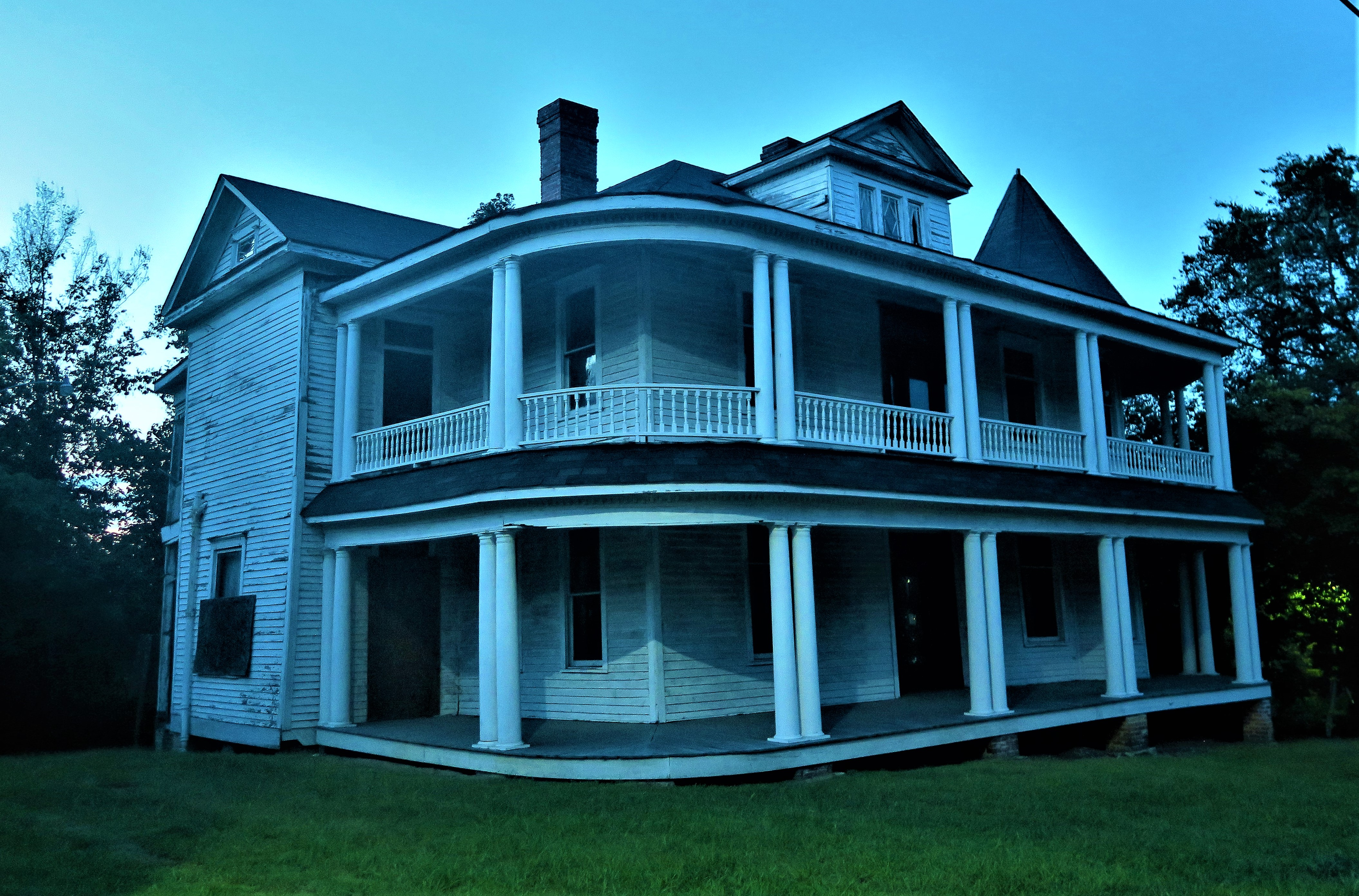

- Location within Mississippi Location within the United States
- Location: 308 Monroe Street; Yazoo City, Mississippi
- Coordinates: 32°50′37″N 90°24′50″W
- Area: less than one acre
- Architect: Augustus J. Oakes
- Architectural style: Colonial Revival, Queen Anne
- NRHP reference No.: 93000207
- Added to NRHP: April 8, 1993; 33 years ago

The Augustus J. Oakes House is a historic residence in Yazoo City, Mississippi. Augustus J. Oakes (March 22, 1854 - October 2, 1924) was the founder of the private Oakes Academy school for African Americans in 1884. He was married to Emma Johnson Oakes (1882 - 1942) and is buried in Yazoo City's Glenwood Cemetery. The house was added to the National Register of Historic Places on April 8, 1993. It is located at 308 Monroe Street.

== See also ==
- National Register of Historic Places listings in Yazoo County, Mississippi
