= Plumville, Mississippi =

- Ghost town
- Location within the state of Mississippi
- Coordinates: 32°40′05″N 90°18′30″W
- Country: United States
- State: Mississippi
- County: Yazoo
- Elevation: 200 ft (61 m)
- Time zone: UTC-6 (Central (CST))
  - Summer (DST): UTC-5 (CDT)
- GNIS feature ID: 686683

Plumville is a ghost town in Yazoo County, Mississippi, United States.
