= Mosely-Woods House =

Historic house in Mississippi, United States

- U.S. National Register of Historic Places
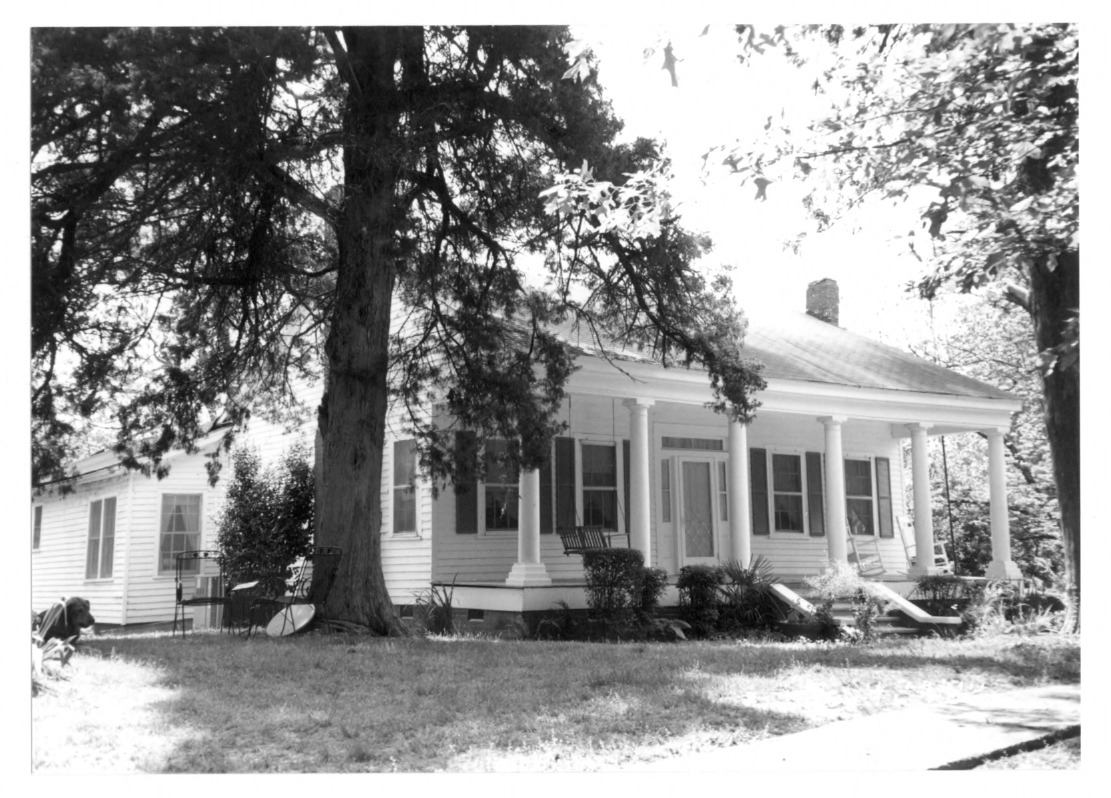

- Location within Mississippi Location within the United States
- Location: 1461 Bell Rd., Yazoo City, Mississippi
- Coordinates: 32°49′20″N 90°26′7″W
- Area: less than one acre
- Built: 1860
- Architectural style: Greek Revival
- NRHP reference No.: 05000623
- Added to NRHP: June 25, 2005

The Mosely-Woods House (also known as the Starling-Wilburn House) is a historic house located near Yazoo City, Mississippi. The house is notable for its Greek Revival architecture and its significance as one of the earliest African-American-owned residences in the area, continuously owned by the same family since 1880.

== History ==
The house was built circa 1860 on what was once part of the old Ridge Road, an important route from Yazoo City to Vicksburg. In October 1880, William Mosely, an early African-American landowner in Yazoo County, purchased the house and its surrounding three acres from Ann Holt, a prominent local landowner. Mosely's heirs have owned the property ever since, with the house being passed down through generations.

== Architectural significance ==
The Mosely-Woods House is a one-story frame planter's cottage featuring a full-width front porch supported by six round, wooden Doric columns. The house's original structure includes two rooms wide and two rooms deep, with a rear addition constructed around 1880. The house is notable for its historic six-inch heart cypress floors and plastered interior walls, which have been well-maintained over the years.

== Heritage significance ==
The Mosely-Woods House was listed on the National Register of Historic Places on June 25, 2005, due to its association with the African-American heritage in Yazoo County and its continuous ownership by the same family for over a century.
