= Benton Academy =

Location
- 216 Academy Drive, P.O. Drawer 308; Benton, Mississippi 39039
- 32°49′10″N 90°15′24″W

Information
- Established: 1969
- NCES School ID: 00736017
- Headmaster: Bryan Dendy
- Teaching staff: 19.1 (FTE)
- Grades: PK-12
- Enrollment: 275 (2024–2025)
- Student to teacher ratio: 11.3
- Nickname: Raiders
- Accreditation: Mississippi Association of Independent Schools, Southern Association of Colleges and Schools
- Website: school website

Benton Academy is an independent, co-educational college preparatory school in Benton, Mississippi (United States). It is a member of the Midsouth Association of Independent Schools. The school is located in Yazoo County, Mississippi. It was founded as a segregation academy in 1969, and still did not enroll a single black student as of 2010.

== History ==
Benton Academy was founded in 1969 as a segregation academy in response to the court ordered racial desegregation of public schools. The school opened in January 1970 in the middle of the school year.

In 1977, the NAACP called for the principal of Benton High School to resign since he was perceived to condone segregation by sending his children to Benton Academy.

When the school opened in 1969, it enrolled 460 students, but attendance fell to about 210 students in the 1970s and 1980s. In the early 1990s, the headmaster looked forwards to increasing enrollment after the opening of the Yazoo City federal prison.

== Demographics ==
For the 2019–2020 school year, the school enrolled 216 students in grades PK-12, all of whom were white.

== Athletics ==
Benton Academy athletic teams compete in the Mississippi Association of Independent Schools league.

== Notable alumni ==
- Ben Beckwith, football player
- Wes Shivers, Class of 1995 – Former NFL offensive lineman and MMA fighter.

== See also ==
- List of Private Schools in Mississippi
