= Otha Williams =

American politician

Member of the Mississippi House of Representatives from the 26th district
- Incumbent
- Assumed office December 10, 2025
- Preceded by: Orlando Paden

Personal details
- Born: Philadelphia, Pennsylvania
- Party: Democratic

Otha E. Williams III is an American politician who serves as a member of the Mississippi House of Representatives for the 26th district. A member of the Democratic Party, Williams was first elected in a special election in 2025.

== See also ==
- 2025 United States state legislative elections
