= Ground Zero Blues Club =

Music venue in Mississippi, US

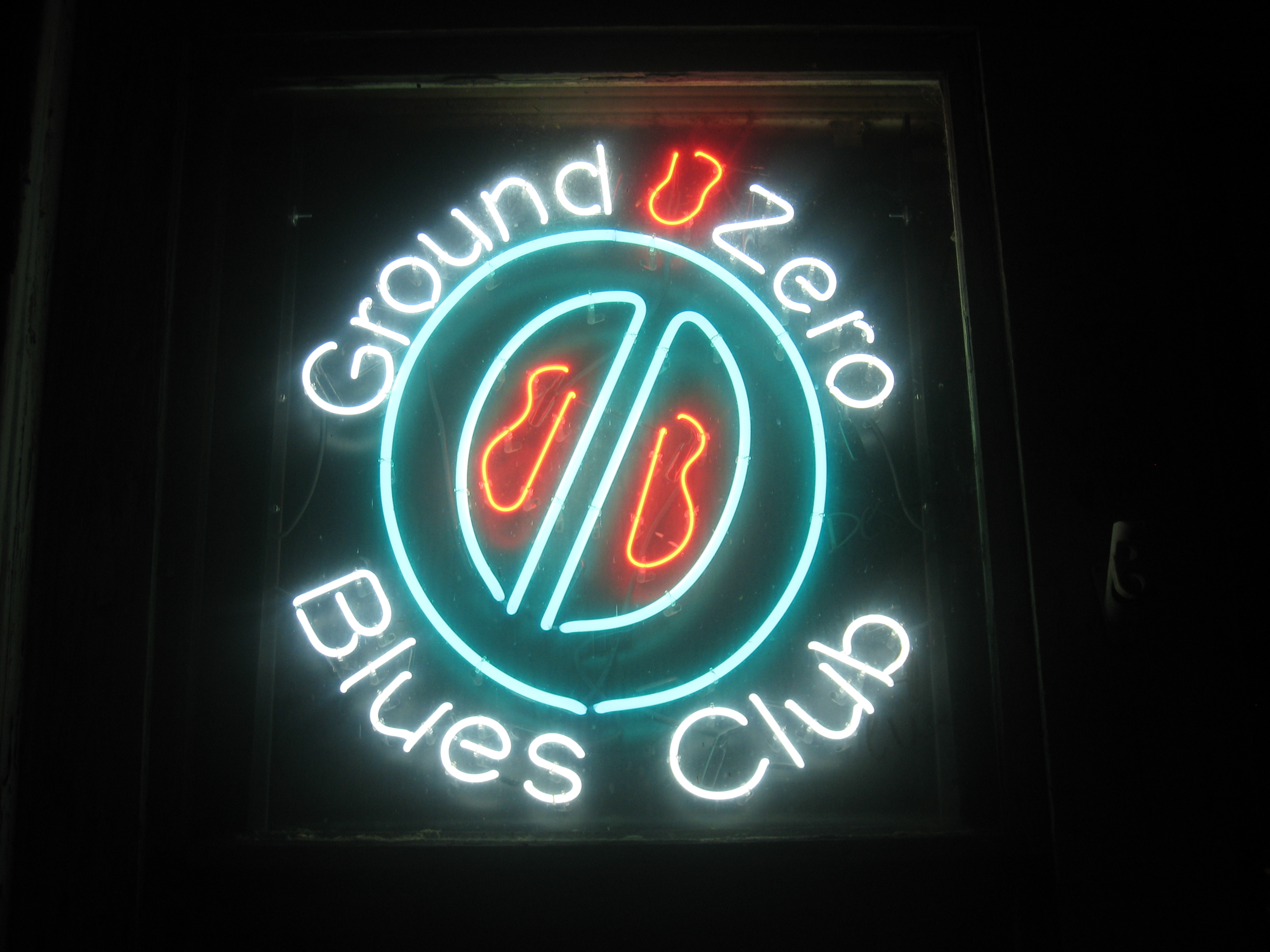

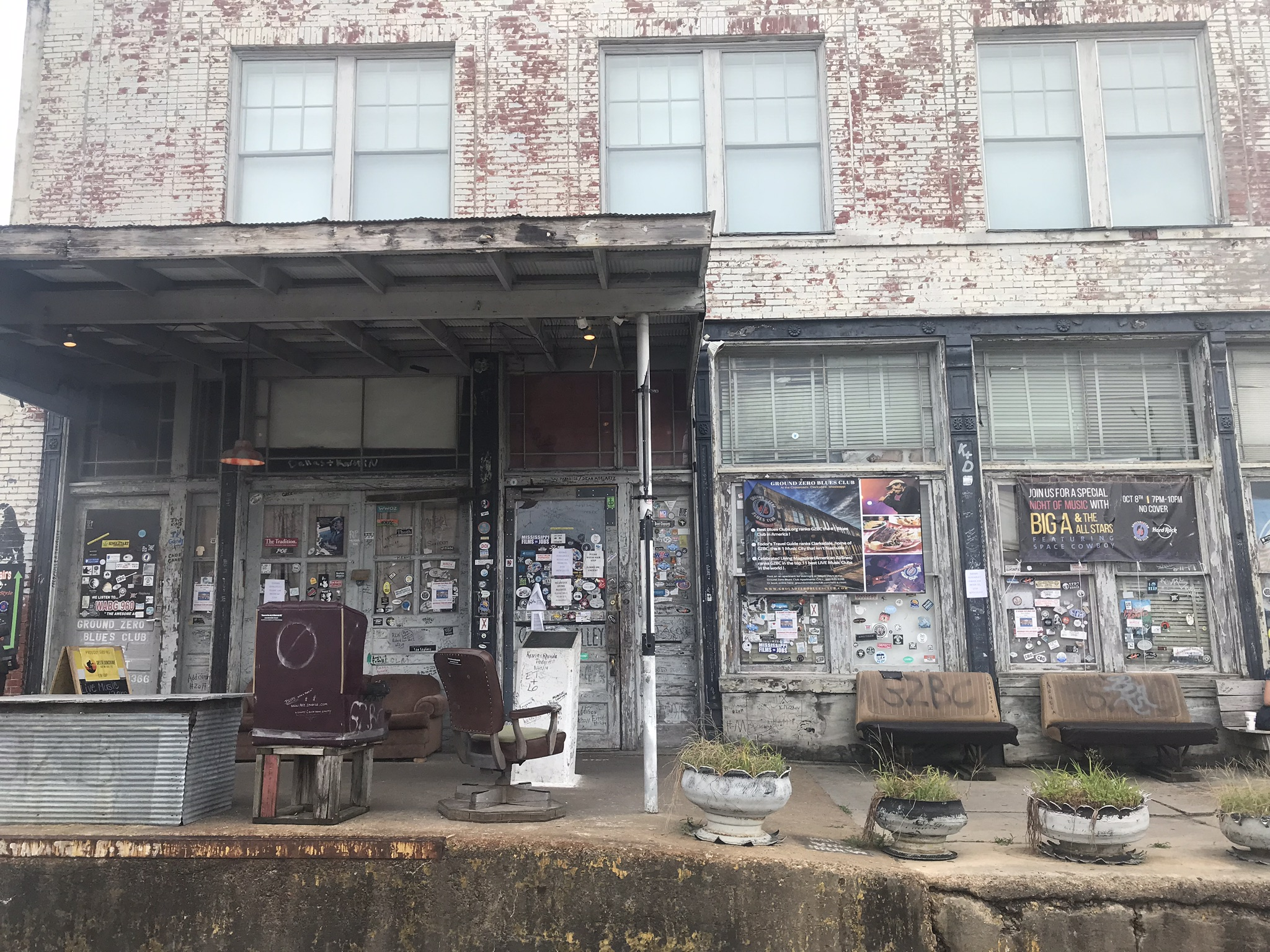
- Exterior of Ground Zero Blues Club, 2019.
- Interactive map of Ground Zero Blues Club
- Address: 387 Delta Avenue
- Location: Clarksdale, Mississippi
- Coordinates: 34°12′00″N 90°34′28″W
- Owner: Morgan Freeman; Howard Stovall; Eric Meier
- Capacity: 800 (standing); 400 (seated)

Construction
- Opened: May 2001

Ground Zero is a blues club in Clarksdale, Mississippi, US that is co-owned by Morgan Freeman, Memphis entertainment executive Howard Stovall, and businessman Eric Meier. Attorney Bill Luckett was also co-owner until his death in 2021. It got its name from Clarksdale being historically referred to as "Ground Zero" for the blues. It opened in May 2001 and is located near the Delta Blues Museum. In the style of juke joints, it is in a repurposed, un-remodeled building, vacant for 30 years, that had housed the wholesale Delta Grocery and Cotton Co. The venue is filled with mismatched chairs, Christmas-tree lights, and graffiti. Blues fans in Clarksdale welcomed it as a place where local musicians have a chance to work regularly.

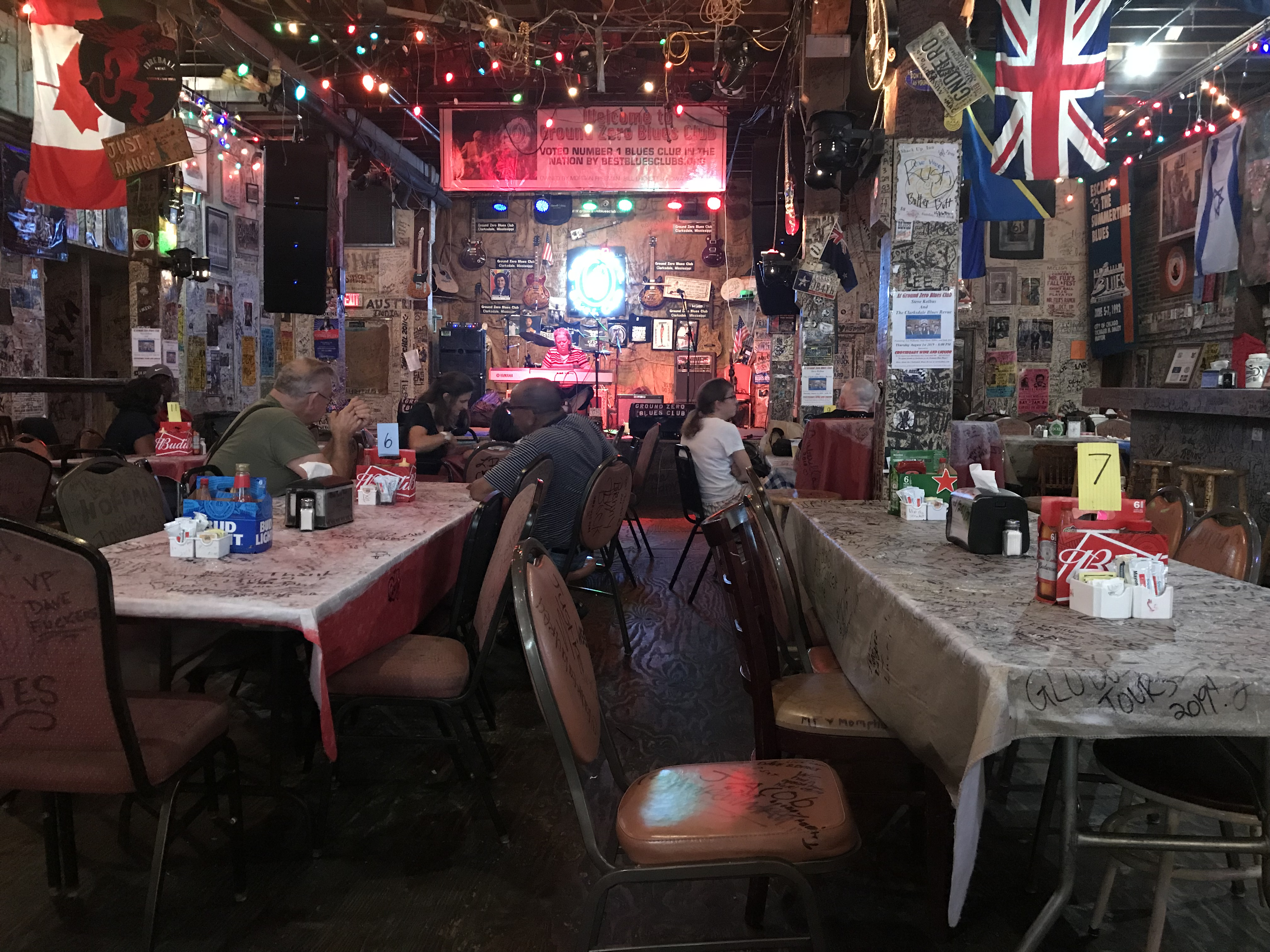
Interior of Ground Zero Blues Club, 2019. Performer is Lala Craig.

The menu consists of traditional Southern foods, and the restaurant has live blues music playing Wednesday through Saturday. In addition to the food and music, there are seven rental apartments above the club.

Ground Zero is also associated with Ground Zero Biloxi, located in Biloxi, Mississippi.

== Performers ==
Ground Zero has hosted local, national, and international performers. Artists include:

- Christone "Kingfish" Ingram
- Super Chikan
- Charlie Musselwhite
- Bobby Rush
- Willie Nelson
- Robert Plant
- Paul Simon
- Anthony "Big A" Sherrod

== Symphonic Blues Experience ==
Since 2022, Ground Zero has merged Delta blues with symphony music from around the world through the Symphonic Blues Experience. Performances include collaborations with:

- Savannah Philharmonic in Savannah, Georgia
- RTÉ Concert Orchestra in Dublin, Ireland
- Big Island Orchestra in Wolfgangsee, Austria

== In media ==
Ground Zero has appeared in many television shows and publications, including:

- CBS 60 Minutes
- NPR
- CNN
- The New York Times
- Southern Living
- Stephen Fry in America (BBC Documentary), third episode, aired October 26, 2008.
- The Mighty Mississippi
- "The Story of God w/ Morgan Freeman, S1/E3 (Who is God)" ([NatGeo])
- Loud Hailer Magazine
- Garden & Gun Magazine
- National Geographic
- The Times

== Video ==
- Robert Mugge, Director (2003). Last of the Mississippi Jukes. Clarksdale and Jackson, Mississippi: MVD Visual. OCLC 971052576.
- Live at Ground Zero Blues Club: Bobby Rush
