= Chuck Espy =

American politician

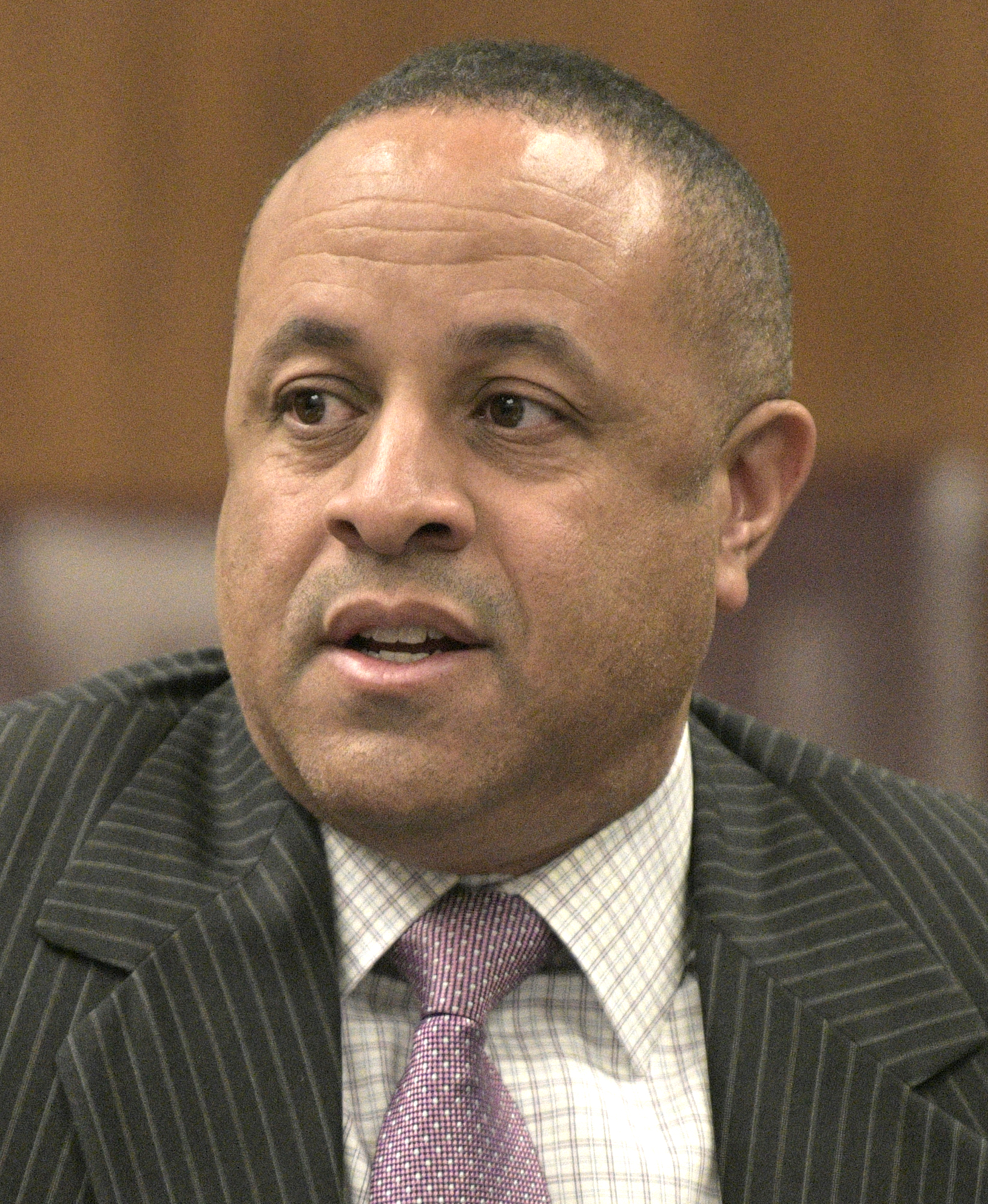

Mayor of Clarksdale, Mississippi
- In office July 1, 2017 – June 30, 2025
- Preceded by: Bill Luckett
- Succeeded by: Orlando Paden

Member of the Mississippi House of Representatives from the 26th district
- In office January 4, 2000 – January 5, 2016
- Preceded by: Leonard Henderson
- Succeeded by: Orlando Paden

Personal details
- Born: Henry William Espy III; April 24, 1975 (age 51) Clarksdale, Mississippi, U.S.
- Party: Democratic
- Spouse: Lynn
- Education: Southern University (BS); Bethel University (MBA)

Henry William "Chuck" Espy III (born April 24, 1975) is an American politician who served as mayor of Clarksdale, Mississippi from 2017 to 2025. He was a member of the Mississippi House of Representatives from 2000 to 2016.

== Biography ==
Espy served in the Mississippi House of Representatives for 16 years. He was elected from District 26 in 1999.

Espy spoke on the House floor against a voter ID bill. He voted to protect retired teachers' 13th check and to fully fund the Mississippi Adequate Education Program (MAEP). The legislation Espy is most proud of is the bill he co-authored in 2010, the Children's Health Insurance Program (CHIP), which gave health insurance to thousands of Mississippi children.

Espy received his Bachelor of Science degree in business management from Southern University in Baton Rouge, Louisiana, and his master's degree in business administration from Bethel University in McKenzie, Tennessee.

Espy is president of Century Funeral Home and Burial Association.

His father is former Clarksdale mayor Henry Espy and his uncle is former U.S. Secretary of Agriculture Mike Espy.

Espy served two terms as mayor of Clarksdale from 2017 to 2025. He did not seek re-election as mayor of Clarksdale in 2025, and was succeeded as mayor by Democratic Mississippi state representative Orlando Paden.
