= T. J. Huddleston Sr. =

Thomas Jefferson Huddleston Sr.
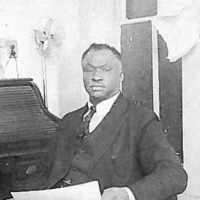
- Born: June 1, 1876; Mississippi, U.S.
- Died: October 1959 (aged 83)
- Occupations: Entrepreneur, Community Leader
- Known for: Founding the Afro-American Sons and Daughters, Establishing the Afro-American Hospital
- Notable work: Founding the Afro-American Sons and Daughters, Afro-American Hospital
- Spouse: Patience Huddleston
- Children: Thomas Jefferson Huddleston Jr. (1909–1990); Toledo Huddleston; Willie Jean Huddleston (1914–1985); Carrie Huddleston; Fontaine Huddleston; Ethel Huddleston; Lula Huddleston; Blanche Huddleston; Christopher Columbus Huddleston (1896-1982)
- Relatives: Mike Espy (grandson); Henry Espy (grandson); Chuck Espy (great-grandson); Leon Finney Sr. (son); Leon Finney Jr. (grandson); Mike Espy (American football) (great-grandson)

Thomas Jefferson Huddleston Sr. (June 1, 1876 – October 1959) was a prominent African American entrepreneur and community leader in Mississippi. He owned dozens of funeral homes in Mississippi. He was the grandfather of former U.S. Secretary of Agriculture Mike Espy, former Mayor Henry Espy of Clarksdale, Mississippi, and great-grandfather of current Clarksdale, Mississippi, mayor and former Mississippi representative Chuck Espy (D - Clarksdale).

Huddleston was also the father of Leon Finney Sr. (1916–2008), the founder of the popular Leon's Bar-B-Q chain in Chicago, who in turn was the father of Leon Finney Jr. (1938–2020), a prominent Chicago minister and president and CEO of the Woodlawn Organization. The Chicago and Mississippi branches of the family retain political ties.

== Background ==
T. J. Huddleston Sr. was born on June 1, 1876.

In 1924, Huddleston founded the Afro-American Sons and Daughters, a fraternal organization in Yazoo City, Mississippi. Four years later, he built and operated the Afro-American Hospital in Yazoo. It was Mississippi's first hospital owned and operated by blacks.

During the Great Depression, he loaned the Mississippi General Baptist Convention $50,000 to save it from bankruptcy.

Huddleston's children with his wife Patience included:

- Carrie Huddleston
- Fontaine Huddleston
- Ethel Huddleston
- Lula Huddleston
- Thomas Jefferson Huddleston Jr., (March 2, 1909—May 10, 1990))
- Toledo Huddleston - mother of Dr. Luke Helm of Chicago, IL
- Willie Jean Huddleston, (October 22, 1914—September 1985) mother of Carrie Jean Espy, Henry Espy, Thomas Espy, LaVerne Espy, Joyce Espy, Mike Espy and Michelle Espy.

Huddleston had one child with Georgiana Colvin called Blanche Huddleston.

Huddleston had one child with Jennie Parker: Christopher Columbus Huddleston (April 18, 1896 - December 12, 1982)

== Afro American Sons and Daughters ==
"Under the burden of Jim Crow, how did African Americans obtain health care? For nearly 40 years the Afro-American Hospital of Yazoo City, Mississippi, was a leading health care supplier for blacks in the Mississippi Delta. It was founded in 1928 by the Afro-American Sons and Daughters, a black fraternal society, and provided a wide range of medical services. The society, which eventually had 35,000 members, was led by Thomas J. Huddleston, a prosperous black entrepreneur and advocate of Booker T. Washington's self-help philosophy. The hospital had a low death rate compared to other hospitals that served blacks in the South during the period. It ceased operation in 1966 as a fraternal entity after years of increasingly burdensome regulation, competitive pressure from government and third-party health care alternatives, and the migration of younger dues-paying blacks to the North."

The hospital closed in 1972. Since then the building has sat idle, deteriorating in Yazoo City. But it certainly was active during the 60 years it served the black community. It was the first hospital for African Americans in the state when it was built. Before then, there was no health care facility blacks could use.

"He was quite a figure. At one point he was the largest black land owner in Mississippi. But he always wanted to serve the people. So he started a grand lodge called the Afro American Sons and Daughters Grand Lodge. After a while he said 'I'm tired of our women having our babies in cotton fields, and we need to build us a hospital. Give me a dollar for a brick and I'll build us a hospital,'" detailed Espy.

Then for 50 cents a month dues, members of the organization qualified for any care the facility offered. Over 30 thousand operations were performed here. No telling how many babies were born here. And people had a safety net and were no longer helpless if they needed hospitalization.

A new Afro-American Sons and Daughters Hospital Association is trying to raise over a million and a half dollars to restore the old building and turn it into a museum, a day care facility and perhaps include an out-patient clinic.
