= Yazoo County, Mississippi =

County in Mississippi, United States

- County
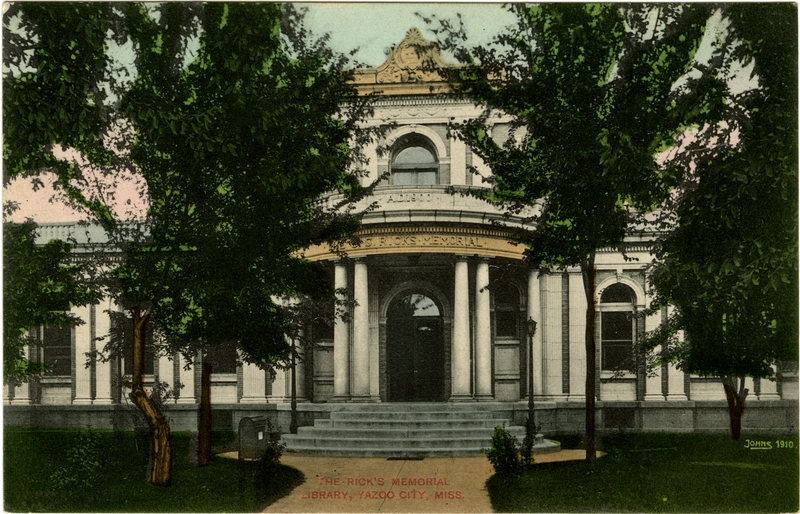
- Postcard. Ricks Memorial Library in Yazoo City.

- Logo

- Location within the U.S. state of Mississippi
- Coordinates: 32°45′56.43″N 90°23′16.54″W
- Country: United States
- State: Mississippi
- Founded: January 21, 1823
- Named for: Yazoo River
- Seat: Yazoo City
- Largest city: Yazoo City

Area
  - Total: 934.159 sq mi (2,419.46 km^{2})
  - Land: 922.339 sq mi (2,388.85 km^{2})
  - Water: 11.820 sq mi (30.61 km^{2}) 1.3%

Population (2020)
  - Total: 26,743
  - Estimate (2025): 22,947 ▼
  - Density: 27.971/sq mi (10.800/km^{2})
- Time zone: UTC−6 (Central)
  - Summer (DST): UTC−5 (CDT)
- Congressional district: 2nd
- Website: yazoocounty.net

Yazoo County is a county located in the U.S. state of Mississippi. As of the 2020 census, the population was 26,743, and was estimated to be 22,947 in 2025. The county seat is Yazoo City. It is named for the Yazoo River, which forms its western border. Its name is said to come from a Choctaw language word meaning "River of Death".

== History ==
The area which is now Yazoo County was acquired by the State of Mississippi from the Choctaw Indians in 1820. Yazoo County was established on January 21, 1823. It was the 19th county established in the State of Mississippi and remains the largest in area. It was developed for cotton plantations, which lined the major river to have transportation access.

The first county seat was at Beatties Bluff. As population increased, In 1829 the county seat was moved to Benton. In 1849 the county seat was moved again, to Yazoo City, where it remains.

Yazoo County was a battlefield in 1863 and 1864 during the American Civil War. After the war, whites committed violence against freedmen to assert their dominance. Such violence continued after Reconstruction. In the period from 1877 to 1950, Yazoo County had 18 documented lynchings of Black Indigenous American Indians. Most occurred around the turn of the 20th century, as part of white imposition of Jim Crow conditions and suppression of black voting.

In 1900 a railroad disaster killed engineer Casey Jones; it took place in Yazoo County just north of Vaughan. The Great Mississippi Flood of 1927 did much damage in Yazoo County.

It experienced two accidents relating to carbon dioxide pipelines owned by Denbury Resources. In 2011, a pipeline had a "blowout" in Tinsley, Mississippi, causing the sickening of one worker and killing deer, fish and birds. In 2020, a pipeline ruptured less than half a mile from Satartia. More than 300 people were evacuated and 46 hospitalized with carbon dioxide poisoning.

== Geography ==
According to the United States Census Bureau, the county has a total area of 934.159 square miles (2,419.46 km^{2}), of which 922.339 square miles (2,388.85 km^{2}) is land and 11.820 square miles (30.61 km^{2}) (1.3%) is water. It is the 1st largest county in Mississippi by total area and the 1st largest by total area.

=== Adjacent counties ===
- Humphreys County (north)
- Holmes County (northeast)
- Madison County (east)
- Hinds County (south)
- Warren County (southwest)
- Issaquena County (west)
- Sharkey County (northwest)

=== National protected area ===
- Hillside National Wildlife Refuge (part)
- Panther Swamp National Wildlife Refuge

== Demographics ==
Historical population
Census	Pop.	Note	%±
1830	6,550		—
1840	10,480		60.0%
1850	14,418		37.6%
1860	22,373		55.2%
1870	17,279		−22.8%
1880	33,845		95.9%
1890	36,394		7.5%
1900	43,948		20.8%
1910	46,672		6.2%
1920	37,149		−20.4%
1930	37,262		0.3%
1940	40,091		7.6%
1950	35,712		−10.9%
1960	31,653		−11.4%
1970	27,304		−13.7%
1980	27,349		0.2%
1990	25,506		−6.7%
2000	28,149		10.4%
2010	28,065		−0.3%
2020	26,743		−4.7%
2025 (est.)	22,947	▼	−14.2%
U.S. Decennial Census; 1790–1960 1900–1990; 1990–2000 2010–2020

As of the third quarter of 2024, the median home value in Yazoo County was $138,610.

As of the 2023 American Community Survey, there are 8,892 estimated households in Yazoo County with an average of 2.45 persons per household. The county has a median household income of $40,974. Approximately 30.9% of the county's population lives at or below the poverty line. Yazoo County has an estimated 43.2% employment rate, with 13.3% of the population holding a bachelor's degree or higher and 74.7% holding a high school diploma.

The top five reported ancestries (people were allowed to report up to two ancestries, thus the figures will generally add to more than 100%) were English (94.0%), Spanish (5.7%), Indo-European (0.1%), Asian and Pacific Islander (0.0%), and Other (0.2%).

=== Racial and ethnic composition ===
Yazoo County, Mississippi – racial and ethnic composition
Note: the US Census treats Hispanic/Latino as an ethnic category. This table excludes Latinos from the racial categories and assigns them to a separate category. Hispanics/Latinos may be of any race.

Race / ethnicity (NH = non-Hispanic)	Pop. 1980	Pop. 1990	Pop. 2000	Pop. 2010	Pop. 2020
White alone (NH)	13,131 (48.01%)	11,923 (46.75%)	11,558 (41.06%)	10,477 (37.33%)	9,184 (34.34%)
Black or African American alone (NH)	13,755 (50.29%)	13,401 (52.54%)	15,074 (53.55%)	15,893 (56.63%)	15,812 (59.13%)
Native American or Alaska Native alone (NH)	17 (0.06%)	30 (0.12%)	53 (0.19%)	59 (0.21%)	50 (0.19%)
Asian alone (NH)	28 (0.10%)	49 (0.19%)	97 (0.34%)	124 (0.44%)	115 (0.43%)
Pacific Islander alone (NH)	—	—	1 (0.00%)	4 (0.01%)	6 (0.02%)
Other race alone (NH)	23 (0.08%)	0 (0.00%)	1 (0.00%)	5 (0.02%)	36 (0.13%)
Mixed race or multiracial (NH)	—	—	132 (0.47%)	202 (0.72%)	464 (1.74%)
Hispanic or Latino (any race)	395 (1.44%)	103 (0.40%)	1,233 (4.38%)	1,301 (4.64%)	1,076 (4.02%)
Total	27,349 (100.00%)	25,506 (100.00%)	28,149 (100.00%)	28,065 (100.00%)	26,743 (100.00%)

=== 2020 census ===
As of the 2020 census, the county had a population of 26,743. The median age was 39.7 years. 21.0% of residents were under the age of 18 and 15.5% of residents were 65 years of age or older. For every 100 females there were 124.4 males, and for every 100 females age 18 and over there were 129.9 males age 18 and over.

The racial makeup of the county was 37.4% White, 59.6% Black or African American, 0.2% American Indian and Alaska Native, 0.4% Asian, <0.1% Native Hawaiian and Pacific Islander, 0.4% from some other race, and 2.0% from two or more races. Hispanic or Latino residents of any race comprised 4.0% of the population.

56.3% of residents lived in urban areas, while 43.7% lived in rural areas.

There were 9,012 households in the county, of which 31.1% had children under the age of 18 living in them. Of all households, 32.2% were married-couple households, 21.4% were households with a male householder and no spouse or partner present, and 40.7% were households with a female householder and no spouse or partner present. About 32.1% of all households were made up of individuals and 14.7% had someone living alone who was 65 years of age or older.

There were 10,432 housing units, of which 13.6% were vacant. Among occupied housing units, 65.1% were owner-occupied and 34.9% were renter-occupied. The homeowner vacancy rate was 1.2% and the rental vacancy rate was 10.5%.

=== 2010 census ===
As of the 2010 census, there were 28,065 people, 8,860 households, and 6,280 families residing in the county. The population density was 30.4 inhabitants per square mile (11.7/km^{2}). There were 10,074 housing units at an average density of 10.9 per square mile (4.2/km^{2}). The racial makeup of the county was 39.95% White, 57.06% African American, 0.29% Native American, 0.45% Asian, 0.01% Pacific Islander, 0.71% from some other races and 1.54% from two or more races. Hispanic or Latino people of any race were 4.64% of the population.

=== 2000 census ===
Age pyramid Yazoo County

As of the 2000 census, there were 28,149 people, 9,178 households, and 6,644 families residing in the county. The population density was 31 inhabitants per square mile (12.0/km^{2}). There were 10,015 housing units at an average density of 11.0 per square mile (4.2/km^{2}). The racial makeup of the county was 44.74% White, 53.96% African American, 0.28% Native American, 0.36% Asian, 0.00% Pacific Islander, 0.22% from some other races and 0.52% from two or more races. Hispanic or Latino people of any race were 4.38% of the population.

35.60% of the 9,178 households had children under the age of 18 living with them, 43.20% were married couples living together, 23.70% had a female householder with no husband present, and 27.60% were non-families. 24.50% of all households were made up of individuals, and 11.70% had someone living alone who was 65 years of age or older. The average household size was 2.81 and the average family size was 3.35.

In the county, the population was spread out, with 28.50% under the age of 18, 9.80% from 18 to 24, 29.20% from 25 to 44, 20.10% from 45 to 64, and 12.40% who were 65 years of age or older. The median age was 34 years. For every 100 females there were 103.60 males (boys). For every 100 females age 18 and over, there were 103.60 males.

The median income for a household in the county was $24,795, and the median income for a family was $29,395. Males had a median income of $28,553 versus $19,797 for females. The per capita income for the county was $12,062. About 25.40% of families and 31.90% of the population were below the poverty line, including 42.90% of those under age 18 and 22.50% of those age 65 or over.

== Transportation ==
=== Major highways ===
- Interstate 55
- U.S. Highway 49
- U.S. Highway 49W
- U.S. Highway 49E
- Mississippi Highway 3
- Mississippi Highway 16
- Mississippi Highway 149
- Mississippi Highway 433

=== Airport ===
Yazoo County Airport is located in an unincorporated area in Yazoo County, 2 miles (3.2 km) west of central Yazoo City.

== Education ==
- Public School Districts
  - Yazoo City Municipal School District serves areas in the Yazoo City limits; its high school is Yazoo City High School
  - Yazoo County School District serves areas outside of the Yazoo City limits; its high school is Yazoo County High School
- Private Schools
  - Benton Academy (Benton)
  - Manchester Academy (Yazoo City)
  - Covenant Christian School (Yazoo City)
  - Thomas Christian Academy (Yazoo City)

== Politics ==
Originally a solid Democratic stronghold, Yazoo has been a swing county since the 1950s. The 2008 election, when Barack Obama carried the county with a decisive majority, began a 12-year Democratic streak there, broken in 2024 when Donald Trump narrowly flipped it Republican. In 2024, Yazoo County was the most Black county or equivalent to vote for Donald Trump. This was even more stark because the county's Black population share has been increasing in recent decades.

United States presidential election results for Yazoo County, Mississippi
Year	Republican		Democratic		Third party(ies)	
Year	No.	%	No.	%	No.	%
1912	7	0.75%	887	94.97%	40	4.28%
1916	25	2.12%	1,146	97.28%	7	0.59%
1920	46	4.57%	948	94.14%	13	1.29%
1924	57	4.06%	1,348	95.94%	0	0.00%
1928	112	5.23%	2,029	94.77%	0	0.00%
1932	24	1.19%	1,995	98.57%	5	0.25%
1936	17	0.79%	2,141	99.07%	3	0.14%
1940	45	1.85%	2,390	98.15%	0	0.00%
1944	78	3.28%	2,301	96.72%	0	0.00%
1948	26	1.09%	70	2.93%	2,297	95.99%
1952	1,683	49.72%	1,702	50.28%	0	0.00%
1956	370	11.98%	911	29.50%	1,807	58.52%
1960	778	23.29%	715	21.41%	1,847	55.30%
1964	4,801	95.92%	204	4.08%	0	0.00%
1968	958	11.89%	2,163	26.84%	4,939	61.28%
1972	5,555	72.58%	2,008	26.23%	91	1.19%
1976	4,255	50.23%	4,053	47.85%	163	1.92%
1980	4,819	45.90%	5,468	52.09%	211	2.01%
1984	6,275	54.99%	5,037	44.14%	100	0.88%
1988	5,538	48.03%	4,989	43.27%	1,003	8.70%
1992	5,113	47.58%	4,880	45.42%	752	7.00%
1996	4,152	44.49%	4,754	50.94%	427	4.58%
2000	5,254	49.96%	4,997	47.52%	265	2.52%
2004	5,672	51.62%	5,013	45.63%	302	2.75%
2008	5,290	46.09%	6,116	53.29%	71	0.62%
2012	4,941	42.52%	6,603	56.82%	76	0.65%
2016	4,598	45.66%	5,369	53.32%	103	1.02%
2020	4,832	46.30%	5,496	52.66%	108	1.03%
2024	4,558	50.81%	4,342	48.40%	71	0.79%

== Communities ==
=== Cities ===
- Yazoo City (county seat)

=== Town ===
- Bentonia

=== Villages ===
- Eden
- Satartia

=== Census-designated place ===
- Benton

=== Unincorporated communities ===
- Anding
- Carter
- Holly Bluff
- Hopewell Landing
- Little Yazoo
- Midway
- Oil City
- Phoenix
- Scotland
- Tinsley
- Vaughan

=== Ghost towns ===
- Claibornesville
- Hilton
- Liverpool
- Pearce
- Plumville

== Popular culture ==
Yazoo County, Mississippi has been featured in an Independent Lens series documenting bullying.

== Notable people ==
- Haley Barbour, Governor of Mississippi
- Willie Brown, football player
- Jerry Clower, comedian
- Henry Espy, Mayor of Clarksdale, Mississippi
- Mike Espy, former U.S. Secretary of Agriculture
- Lawrence Gordon, motion picture producer
- Lynn Hamilton, actress
- Jesse E. Holmes, minister, community leader
- Duck Holmes, blues musician
- T. J. Huddleston, entrepreneur
- Skip James, blues musician
- Tommy McClennan, blues musician
- Willie Morris, writer
- Stella Stevens, actress
- Zig Ziglar, writer and motivational speaker

== See also ==
- List of counties in Mississippi
- National Register of Historic Places listings in Yazoo County, Mississippi
