= Ricks Memorial Library =

- U.S. National Register of Historic Places
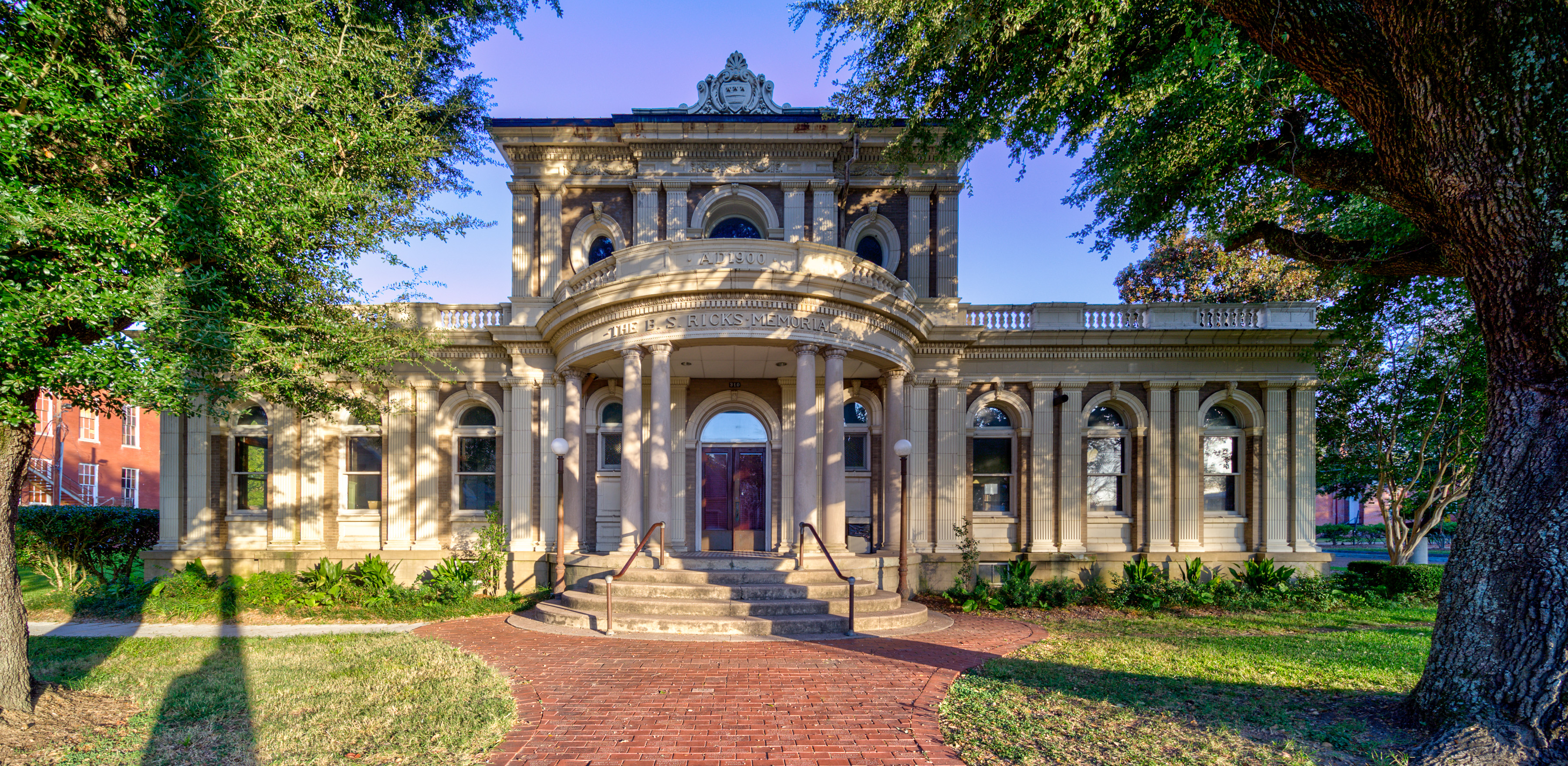
- Ricks Memorial Library in 2022

- Location within Mississippi Location within the United States
- Location: 310 N. Main Street; Yazoo City, Mississippi
- Coordinates: 32°50′55″N 90°24′43″W
- Area: 1 acre (0.40 ha)
- Built: 1900
- Architect: Alfred Zucker
- Architectural style: Beaux Arts
- NRHP reference No.: 75001062
- Added to NRHP: September 18, 1975

The B.S. Ricks Memorial Library is a historic library in Yazoo City, Mississippi. It was added to the National Register of Historic Places on September 18, 1975. It is located at 310 North Main Street. The library was founded in 1838 as a membership library. In 1900 Fannie Ricks helped fund construction of the B. S. Ricks Memorial Library building, named after her late husband General B.S. Ricks. It opened in 1901 and had its formal dedication on January 1, 1902. It remains in use.

== See also ==
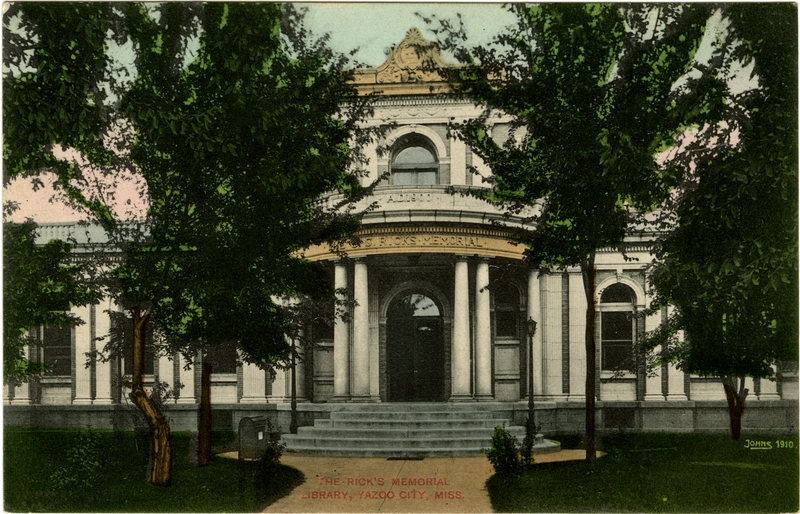
Early twentieth-century colorized black-and-white photo

- National Register of Historic Places listings in Yazoo County, Mississippi
