= Afro-American Sons and Daughters Hospital =

Hospital in Yazoo City, Mississippi, US

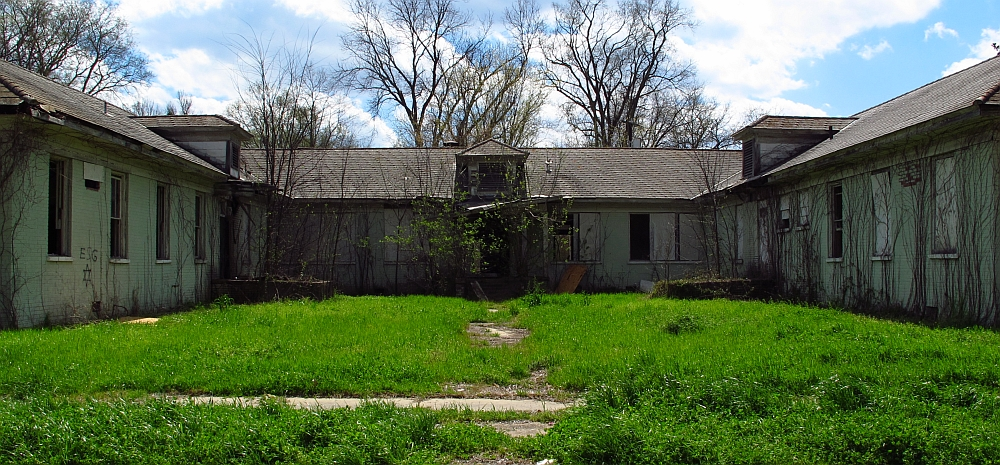
- Afro-American Sons and Daughters Hospital, 2013

Geography
- Location: Mississippi, United States

Organization
- Type: General

History
- Opened: 1928
- Closed: 1966

Links
- Lists: Hospitals in Mississippi
- Afro-American Sons and Daughters Hospital
- U.S. National Register of Historic Places
- Mississippi Landmark
- Location within Mississippi Location within the United States
- Location: 8th St. and Webster Ave., Yazoo City, Mississippi
- Coordinates: 32°51′22″N 90°24′3″W
- Built: 1928
- NRHP reference No.: 05001558
- USMS No.: 163-YAZ-0226-NR-ML

Significant dates
- Added to NRHP: January 24, 2006
- Designated USMS: April 14, 2005

The Afro-American Sons and Daughters Hospital, in Yazoo City, Mississippi, also known as the Afro-American Hospital, was built in 1928. It was listed on the National Register of Historic Places in 2006.

The Afro-American Sons and Daughters was a fraternal organization in Mississippi and one of the leading black voluntary associations in the state. Organized in 1924, it had 35,000 members by the 1930s. The founder of the group was Thomas J. Huddleston, Sr., a prosperous black entrepreneur and advocate of Booker T. Washington's self-help philosophy.

In 1928, the association opened the Afro-American Hospital of Yazoo City, Mississippi, to give low-cost care to the members. Dr. Lloyd Tevis Miller served as the facility's first director. The hospital, which offered both major and minor surgery, was a leading health care supplier for blacks in Mississippi. It had a low death rate compared to other hospitals that served blacks in the South during the period.

The hospital ceased operation in 1966 as a fraternal entity after years of increasingly burdensome regulation, competitive pressure from government and third-party health care alternatives, and the migration of younger dues-paying blacks to the North. The Afro-American Sons and Daughters disbanded during the same period.

Huddleston's grandson is Mike Espy, a former member of the House of Representatives and U.S. Secretary of Agriculture.
