= Mike Espy =

American politician (born 1953)

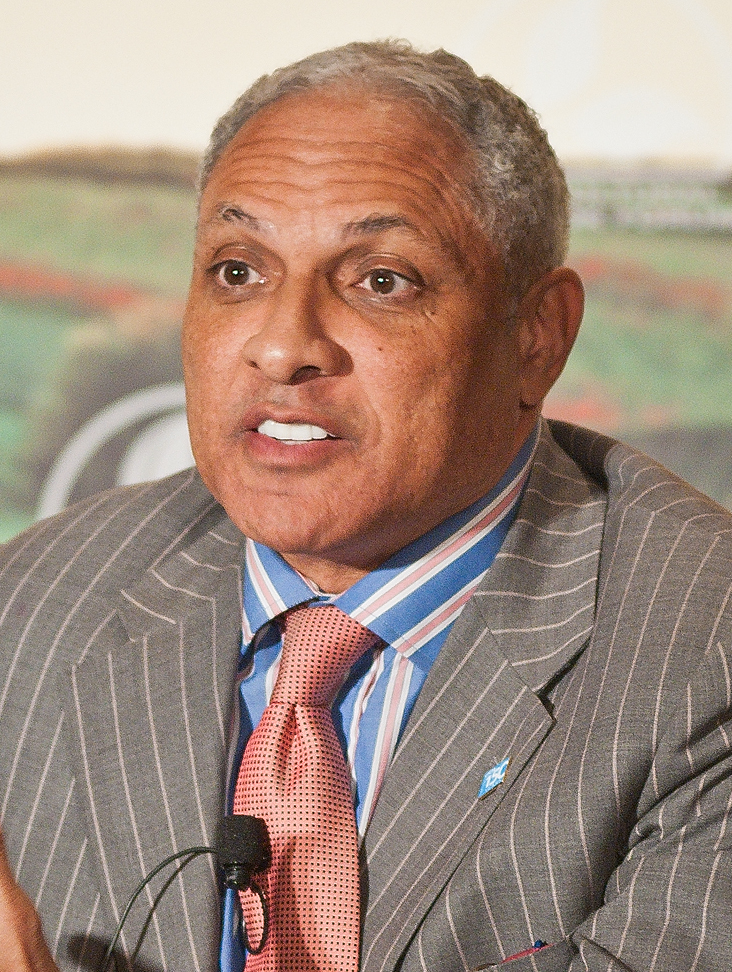
- Espy in 2012

25th United States Secretary of Agriculture
- In office January 22, 1993 – December 31, 1994
- President: Bill Clinton
- Deputy: Richard Rominger
- Preceded by: Ed Madigan
- Succeeded by: Dan Glickman

Member of the U.S. House of Representatives from Mississippi's 2nd district
- In office January 3, 1987 – January 22, 1993
- Preceded by: Webb Franklin
- Succeeded by: Bennie Thompson

Personal details
- Born: Alphonso Michael Espy; November 30, 1953 (age 72) Yazoo City, Mississippi, U.S.
- Party: Democratic
- Spouse: Portia Ballard
- Children: 3
- Relatives: Henry Espy (brother); Chuck Espy (nephew)
- Education: Howard University (BA); Santa Clara University (JD)
- Website: Campaign website

Alphonso Michael Espy (born November 30, 1953) is an American lawyer and politician who served as the 25th U.S. secretary of agriculture from 1993 to 1994. He was both the first African American and the first person from the Deep South to hold the position. A member of the Democratic Party, Espy previously served as the U.S. representative for Mississippi's 2nd congressional district from 1987 to 1993.

In March 2018, Espy announced his candidacy for the United States Senate seat being vacated by Thad Cochran. Espy placed second in the November 6 nonpartisan special election before facing Republican Cindy Hyde-Smith in a November 27 runoff. Espy lost the runoff, but garnered more than 46% of the vote in what was the closest U.S. Senate election in Mississippi since 1988. He was the Democratic nominee again in the 2020 election and lost to Hyde-Smith by ten percentage points.

== Early life and education ==
Espy was born in Yazoo City, Mississippi. He is the grandson of Thomas J. Huddleston Sr., founder of the Afro-American Sons and Daughters, a fraternal society that operated the Afro-American Hospital, a leading provider of health care for black people in the state from the 1920s to the 1970s. Espy attended Howard University in Washington, D.C., and was active in student politics, holding several elective positions. He earned his Juris Doctor degree from Santa Clara University School of Law in California in 1978. He currently serves on the board of directors of the Mississippi Center for Justice.

== Career ==
=== Early years ===
Espy was an attorney with Central Mississippi Legal Services between 1978 and 1980 and during that time he was the Assistant Secretary of State for Mississippi Legal Services. From 1980 to 1984, he was the Assistant Secretary of the State to the Public Lands Division. From 1984 to 1985, he was the Assistant Mississippi Attorney General.

=== Congress and the Secretary of Agriculture ===
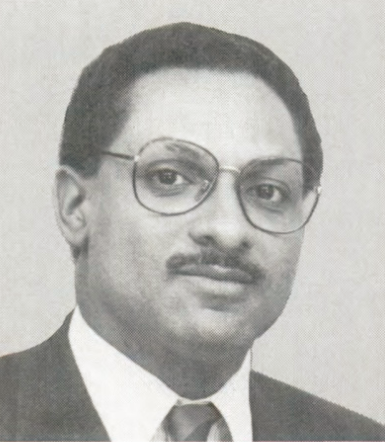
Epsy as a congressman

In November 1986, Espy was elected as a Democrat to the 100th Congress from Mississippi's 2nd congressional district. He defeated two-term Republican Webb Franklin to become the first African-American to represent Mississippi at the federal level since the Reconstruction era, a position once held by Mississippi Republican Senator Hiram Revels in 1870-1871. Espy was reelected three times.

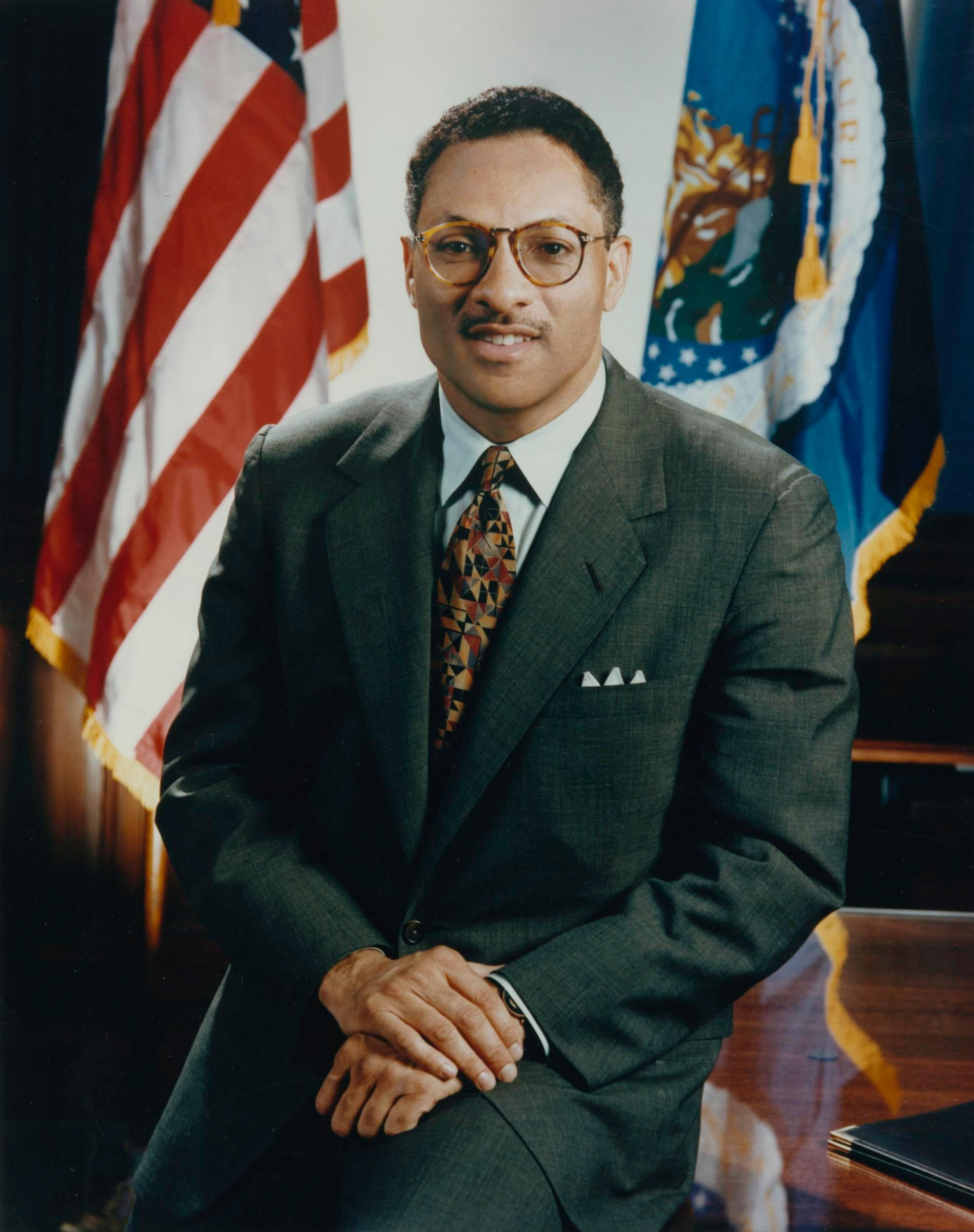
Espy as Secretary of Agriculture

In December 1992, Espy was chosen by President-elect Bill Clinton to be the Secretary of Agriculture in the new administration. Following his confirmation by the Senate in late January 1993, Espy resigned from his seat in the House of Representatives.

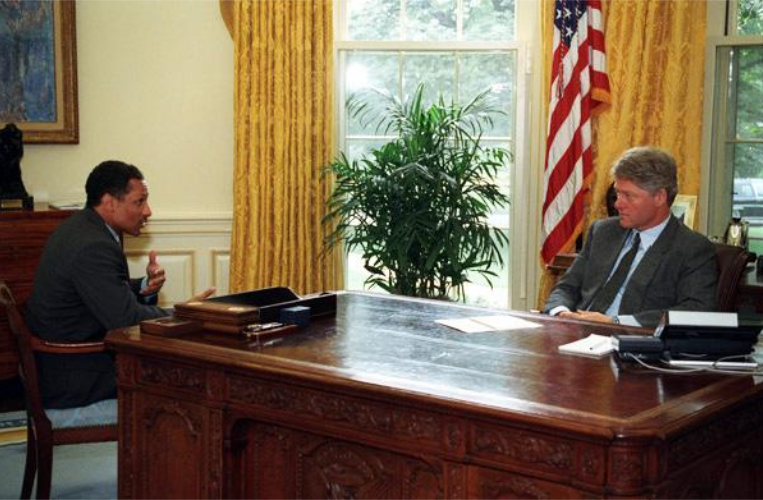
Espy with President Bill Clinton in 1993

The first African American and first person from the Deep South to hold the position, Espy served as Secretary of Agriculture from 1993 to 1994. He announced his resignation in October 1994, following questions from the White House over his use of government perks and acceptance of gifts. He was indicted in 1997 for receiving improper gifts, but acquitted of all 30 charges in 1998.

In October 2007, Espy crossed party lines to endorse Republican Mississippi Governor Haley Barbour's reelection campaign.

=== Private law career ===
In 2008, Espy became an attorney at Morgan & Morgan, a nationwide law firm, where he handles general plaintiff's law, mass tort, bond and governmental finance, and international relations cases. One of his notable cases was the Pigford lawsuit, where Espy worked in conjunction with a black farmers' advocacy group, the National Black Farmers Association, to represent those farmers.

=== Senate campaigns ===
==== 2018 ====
On March 5, 2018, Republican Senator Thad Cochran announced he would resign as of April 1 for health reasons, triggering a special election. Espy announced his intention to run for the seat that same day, becoming the first declared candidate in the race. “It’s official. I’m running to be Mississippi’s next U.S. Senator. Too many people here can’t find a decent job, rural hospitals are closing, and the price for education is just too high,” Espy said in a tweet that Tuesday. He called Cochran "a person I admire and respect, and who has done so much for Mississippi over his tenure."

In 2018, CBS described Espy as a conservative Democrat. He has identified his positions as moderate, making a centrist pitch for his Senate campaign. The Clarion Ledger wrote that Espy sought to "play up his bipartisan credentials, like endorsing former Republican Gov. Haley Barbour. Steer the conversation away from anything controversial, even race, and back to health care." When asked by MSNBC's Chris Matthews to comment on President Trump's criticism of several African-American journalists, Espy "refused to bite", instead redirecting the interview to health care.

A nonpartisan special election took place on November 6, 2018, the same day as the regularly scheduled U.S. Senate election for the seat held by Roger Wicker, who was running for reelection. Party affiliations were not printed on the ballot. After no candidate gained a simple majority of the vote, a runoff election between Espy and Republican Cindy Hyde-Smith was held on November 27. Espy lost the runoff with 46% of the vote.

==== 2020 ====
Three days after losing the Senate special election runoff to Hyde-Smith, on November 30, 2018, his 65th birthday, Espy filed with the Federal Election Commission (FEC) to run for the seat again in 2020. He lost the general election again with 44% of the vote.

== Political positions ==
=== Economy ===
National Journal noted that his liberal social views are mixed with his support for cutting the federal budget and protecting Mississippi's defense and agricultural industries. In 2018, Espy said that he wanted to cut the government's budget and that he supports free trade. He said he probably would have voted for the Tax Cuts and Jobs Act of 2017 but that he wants to "make sure people see the benefits".

=== Guns ===
Espy supports gun ownership and received the National Rifle Association of America's (NRA) Silver Rifle Award in 1988 for supporting its positions on gun laws. In 2018, the NRA endorsed Espy's opponent, Cindy Hyde-Smith, for the U.S. Senate, and did not give Espy a rating. In 2019, Espy, who had announced his candidacy for Hyde-Smith's seat, said that her objection to a unanimous consent motion to adopt a House gun control bill, causing the bill to go through the usual committee process, was "a failure of leadership that puts our children's lives in danger."

=== Health care ===
Espy believes that the decision by Republicans to deny an expansion of Medicaid is why so many rural hospitals in Mississippi have closed.

=== Immigration ===
Espy opposes a border wall, citing cost concerns. He opposes the Trump administration's family separation policy.

=== Social issues ===
In 1986, running for Congress, Espy was considered pro-choice on abortion. In 2018, he said he was moderate on abortion; he supports Roe v. Wade but opposes abortion personally. Espy said during his Senate campaign that he would work with anyone regardless of race, gender, religion, sexual orientation, or disability.

== Corruption trial and acquittal ==
On August 27, 1997, Espy was indicted on charges of receiving improper gifts, including sports tickets, lodging, and airfare. Espy refused to plea bargain and on December 2, 1998, he was acquitted of all 30 criminal charges in the trial. Independent Counsel Donald Smaltz presented more than 70 witnesses during the trial and spent more than $20 million preparing and trying the case.

During testimony before the jury, the prosecution's star witness told Smaltz: "God knows, if I had $30 million, I could find dirt on you, sir." During the trial, Smaltz protested that the defense was injecting race into the trial in what he saw as an appeal to a mostly black jury.

The defense rested without calling any witnesses, arguing simply that the prosecution had not proved its case. The jury deliberated less than 10 hours before finding Espy not guilty on all charges. One of the jurors said, "This was the weakest, most bogus thing I ever saw. I can't believe Mr. Smaltz ever brought this to trial." At least four other jurors echoed this view, though less pointedly. Barbara Bisoni, the only white juror, said Smaltz's case "had holes" and that race never entered into the deliberations.

=== Related cases ===
In 1996, Sun-Diamond Growers was fined $1.5 million for giving Espy $6,000 in gifts; in March 1998 it won a reversal at the Court of Appeals level. Independent Counsel Smaltz appealed that ruling to the Supreme Court. The Supreme Court affirmed the decision of the Court of Appeals, finding that the gratuities statute requires a link between a gift and an official act. Unable to make such a link, Smaltz dismissed the gratuities charge against Sun-Diamond. The court's unanimous April 1999 opinion, by Justice Antonin Scalia, stated that the prosecutor's interpretation of the law was so broad that even a high school principal could be in legal trouble for giving a souvenir baseball cap to a visiting Secretary of Education. The Sun-Diamond decision played a pivotal role in Espy's later acquittal because Smaltz was unable to link gifts he received to any official act.

In a separate case during the same investigation, Espy's Chief of Staff, Ronald Blackley, was convicted in late 1997 on three counts of making false statements and sentenced to 27 months in prison.

Controversy also arose in 1994 from a White House discovery that a foundation run by Tyson Foods had given Espy's then girlfriend, Patricia Dempsey, a $1,200 scholarship. Administration officials said that the discovery of this scholarship was what forced Espy to resign as Secretary of Agriculture. In December 1997, Tyson Foods pleaded guilty to felony charges of giving Espy gifts.

== Personal life ==
He married Sheila Bell, with whom he had two children before they divorced. Espy married Portia Ballard in 1999.

== Electoral history ==
Mississippi's 2nd congressional district: results 1986–1992
Election results
Year	Democrat	Votes	%	Republican	Votes	%	Other	Party	Votes	%
1986	Mike Espy	73,119	51.71%	Webb Franklin	68,292	48.29%				
1988	Mike Espy	112,401	64.74%	Jack Coleman	59,827	34.46%	Dorothy Benford	Independent	1,403	0.81%
1990	Mike Espy	59,393	84.11%	Dorothy Benford	11,224	11.89%				
1992	Mike Espy	135,162	77.97%	Dorothy Benford	38,191	22.03%				

=== Senate results ===
United States Senate special election in Mississippi, 2018
Party	Candidate	Votes	%
Nonpartisan	Cindy Hyde-Smith (incumbent)	389,995	41.25%
Nonpartisan	Mike Espy	386,742	40.90%
Nonpartisan	Chris McDaniel	154,878	16.38%
Nonpartisan	Tobey Bartee	13,852	1.47%
Total votes		945,467	100%

United States Senate special election runoff in Mississippi, 2018
Party	Candidate	Votes	%	±%
Nonpartisan	Cindy Hyde-Smith (incumbent)	486,769	53.63%	-6.27%
Nonpartisan	Mike Espy	420,819	46.37%	+8.48%
Total votes		907,588	100%	N/A

United States Senate election in Mississippi, 2020
Party	Candidate	Votes	%	±%
Republican	Cindy Hyde-Smith (incumbent)	709,539	54.10%	+0.47%
Democratic	Mike Espy	578,806	44.13%	−2.24%
Libertarian	Jimmy Edwards	23,152	1.77%	N/A
Total votes		1,311,497	100%	

== See also ==
- List of African-American United States Cabinet members
- List of African-American United States representatives
- List of African-American United States Senate candidates

U.S. House of Representatives
Preceded by Webb Franklin	Member of the U.S. House of Representatives from Mississippi's 2nd congressional district 1987–1993	Succeeded by Bennie Thompson
Political offices
Preceded by Ed Madigan	United States Secretary of Agriculture; 1993–1994	Succeeded by Dan Glickman
Party political offices
Preceded by Travis Childers	Democratic nominee for U.S. Senator from Mississippi (Class 2); 2018, 2020	Succeeded by Scott Colom
U.S. order of precedence (ceremonial)
Preceded by Bruce Babbitt as Former U.S. Cabinet Member	Order of precedence of the United States as Former U.S. Cabinet Member	Succeeded by Donna Shalala as Former U.S. Cabinet Member
