= Benton, Mississippi =

- Census-designated place
- Location within Mississippi Location within the United States
- Coordinates: 32°49′21″N 90°15′34″W
- Country: United States
- State: Mississippi
- County: Yazoo

Area
  - Total: 4.56 sq mi (11.82 km^{2})
  - Land: 4.56 sq mi (11.82 km^{2})
  - Water: 0 sq mi (0.00 km^{2})
- Elevation: 315 ft (96 m)

Population (2020)
  - Total: 415
  - Density: 90.9/sq mi (35.11/km^{2})
- Time zone: UTC-6 (Central (CST))
  - Summer (DST): UTC-5 (CDT)
- ZIP code: 39039
- GNIS feature ID: 2804175

Benton is a census-designated place (CDP) and unincorporated community in Yazoo County, Mississippi. Per the 2020 Census, the population was 415.

Mississippi Highway 433 passes through the community.

== History ==
Benton was settled in 1828 by William P. Gadberry. The first county court was held in his log home.

The county seat was moved from Beatties Bluff to Benton in 1829. Benton developed quickly, and soon became the center of trade. Benton was chartered in 1836, and incorporated in 1846. In 1849, the county seat was moved to Yazoo City, to which a Mr. Benton wrote at the time:

With the removal of the county seat, Benton began to decline and each year its population lessens, and the few houses left are dilapidated, dingy, decaying, and tumbling down. Its population is about forty or fifty. It has two or three small stores, which do a limited neighborhood business.

The Yazoo County Agricultural High School—one of the largest and best of its kind in the state—was constructed in Benton in 1912. Benton High School was opened in 1930, and was used until the late 1990s. These educational facilities required new gravel roads to be constructed to Benton, which encouraged families to move back to the town. New stores were built, a deep well was dug, and a telephone exchange was established.

The March Against Fear in 1966 passed through Benton. Martin Luther King Jr. and others camped at the Oak Grove AME Church south of the town, where they were given food and water by members of the church and by the Woods family, who owned property next to the church. A historic marker is located there.

== Demographics ==
Historical population
Census	Pop.	Note	%±
2020	415		—
U.S. Decennial Census; 2020

Benton was first listed as a census designated place in the 2020 U.S. census.

=== 2020 census ===
Benton CDP, Mississippi – Racial and ethnic composition Note: the US Census treats Hispanic/Latino as an ethnic category. This table excludes Latinos from the racial categories and assigns them to a separate category. Hispanics/Latinos may be of any race.
Race / Ethnicity (NH = Non-Hispanic)	Pop 2020	% 2020
White alone (NH)	298	71.81%
Black or African American alone (NH)	94	22.65%
Native American or Alaska Native alone (NH)	3	0.72%
Asian alone (NH)	1	0.24%
Native Hawaiian or Pacific Islander alone (NH)	1	0.24%
Other race alone (NH)	1	0.24%
Mixed race or Multiracial (NH)	10	2.41%
Hispanic or Latino (any race)	7	1.69%
Total	415	100.00%

== Parks and recreation ==
Benton Country Club is located in the town.

== Education ==
The town is served by the Yazoo County School District. Residents are zoned to Yazoo County Middle School and Yazoo County High School. Benton Academy, a private school, is located here.

== Infrastructure ==
The town is served by the Benton Volunteer Fire Department.

== Notable people ==
- Fred Waters, professional baseball player and minor league coach.
- John Sharp Williams, Minority Leader of the U.S. House of Representatives from 1903 to 1908; lived on nearby Cedar Grove Plantation.
