= Satartia, Mississippi =

- Village
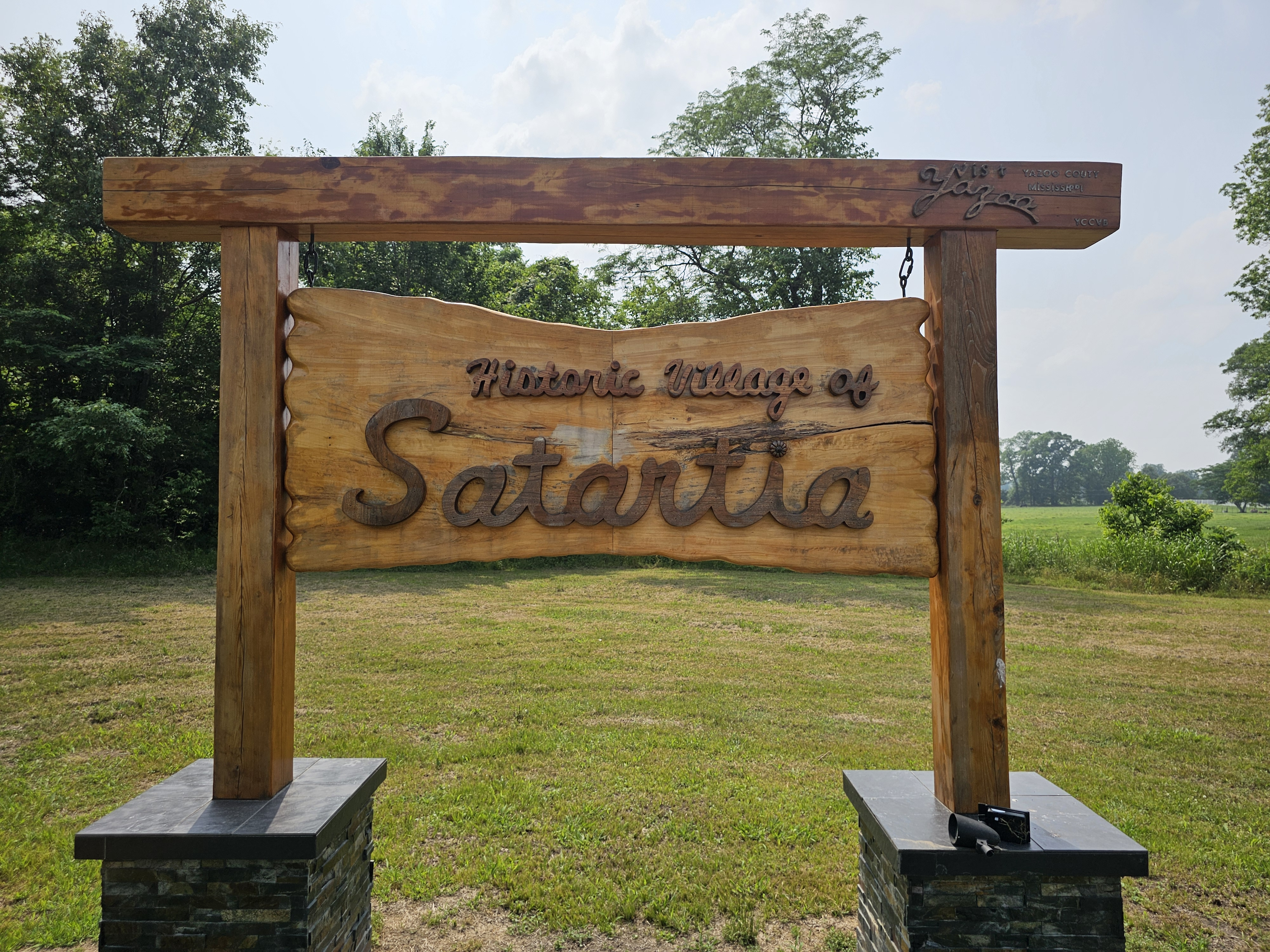
- Welcome Sign in Satartia

- Location of Satartia, Mississippi

- Location in the United States Satartia, Mississippi (the United States)
- Coordinates: 32°40′19″N 90°32′40″W
- Country: United States
- State: Mississippi
- County: Yazoo

Government
  - Type: Mayor-Council
  - Mayor: Michelle Douglas
  - Board of Aldermen: Jennifer Douglas, Kathy Nesbit, Mary Kathryn Hart

Area
  - Total: 0.14 sq mi (0.37 km^{2})
  - Land: 0.14 sq mi (0.37 km^{2})
  - Water: 0 sq mi (0.00 km^{2})
- Elevation: 102 ft (31 m)

Population (2020)
  - Total: 41
  - Density: 284.7/sq mi (109.91/km^{2})
- Time zone: UTC-6 (Central (CST))
  - Summer (DST): UTC-5 (CDT)
- ZIP code: 39162
- Area code: 662
- FIPS code: 28-65680
- GNIS feature ID: 2407542

Satartia is a village in Yazoo County, Mississippi. Per the 2020 Census, the population was 41, Mississippi's smallest incorporated municipality by population.

Located on the east bank of the Yazoo River, Satartia was once a thriving river port, and is one of the oldest non-Native settlements in Yazoo County.

== History ==
Satartia is a Choctaw word meaning "pumpkin place", likely due to the small gourds that grow in the area. In the early 1800s, Satartia was a busy shipping point from which cotton was transported by steamboat to New Orleans along the Yazoo River.

During the Civil War, General Grant sailed a gunboat from Vicksburg and captured the village; the Wilson House on Plum Street was used as his headquarters during the occupation. The war also produced the "Satartia Rifles", of the 12th Mississippi Infantry Regiment, a well-regarded Confederate company and recruitment group.

In February 2020, a pressurized pipeline owned by Denbury Resources carrying liquid carbon dioxide and hydrogen sulfide ruptured "less than half a mile [(800 m)]" from Satartia. First responders evacuated Satartia's 42 residents, and approximately 250 others living near Satartia. In 2022, the Pipeline and Hazardous Materials Safety Administration recommended a civil penalty of $3,866,734 against Denbury Resources.

== Geography ==
According to the United States Census Bureau, the village has a total area of 0.2 square miles (0.52 km^{2}), all land.

== Demographics ==
Historical population
Census	Pop.	Note	%±
1900	146		—
1910	187		28.1%
1920	135		−27.8%
1930	139		3.0%
1940	152		9.4%
1950	105		−30.9%
1960	126		20.0%
1970	95		−24.6%
1980	73		−23.2%
1990	59		−19.2%
2000	68		15.3%
2010	55		−19.1%
2020	41		−25.5%
U.S. Decennial Census; 2010 2020

=== 2020 census ===
Satartia village, Mississippi - Demographic Profile (NH = Non-Hispanic)
Race / Ethnicity	Pop 2010	Pop 2020	% 2010	% 2020
White alone (NH)	49	35	89.09%	85.37%
Black or African American alone (NH)	6	2	10.91%	4.88%
Native American or Alaska Native alone (NH)	0	0	0.00%	0.00%
Asian alone (NH)	0	0	0.00%	0.00%
Pacific Islander alone (NH)	0	0	0.00%	0.00%
Some Other Race alone (NH)	0	0	0.00%	0.00%
Mixed Race/Multi-Racial (NH)	0	2	0.00%	4.88%
Hispanic or Latino (any race)	0	2	0.00%	4.88%
Total	55	41	100.00%	100.00%

Note: the US Census treats Hispanic/Latino as an ethnic category. This table excludes Latinos from the racial categories and assigns them to a separate category. Hispanics/Latinos can be of any race.

=== 2010 Census ===
As of the 2010 United States census, there were 55 people living in the village. 89.1% were White, and 10.9% were Black or African American.

As of the census of 2000, there were 68 people, 28 households, and 22 families living in the village. The population density was 454.5 inhabitants per square mile (175.5/km^{2}). There were 32 housing units at an average density of 213.9 per square mile (82.6/km^{2}). The racial make-up of the village was 85.29% White and 14.71% African American.

There were 28 households, out of which 25.0% had children under the age of 18 living with them, 64.3% were married couples living together, 10.7% had a female householder with no husband present, and 17.9% were non-families. 14.3% of all households were made up of individuals, and 10.7% had someone living alone who was 65 years of age or older. The average household size was 2.43 and the average family size was 2.70.

In the village, the population was spread out, with 17.6% under the age of 18, 5.9% from 18 to 24, 22.1% from 25 to 44, 38.2% from 45 to 64, and 16.2% who were 65 years of age or older. The median age was 50 years. For every 100 females, there were 106.1 males. For every 100 females age 18 and over, there were 100.0 males.

The median income for a household in the village was $36,875, and the median income for a family was $43,500. Males had a median income of $28,750 versus $38,333 for females. The per capita income for the village was $17,073. There were no families and 4.7% of the population living below the poverty line, including none under 18 and 17.6% of those over 64.

== Education ==
The Village of Satartia is served by the Yazoo County School District. Residents are zoned to Yazoo County Middle School and Yazoo County High School.

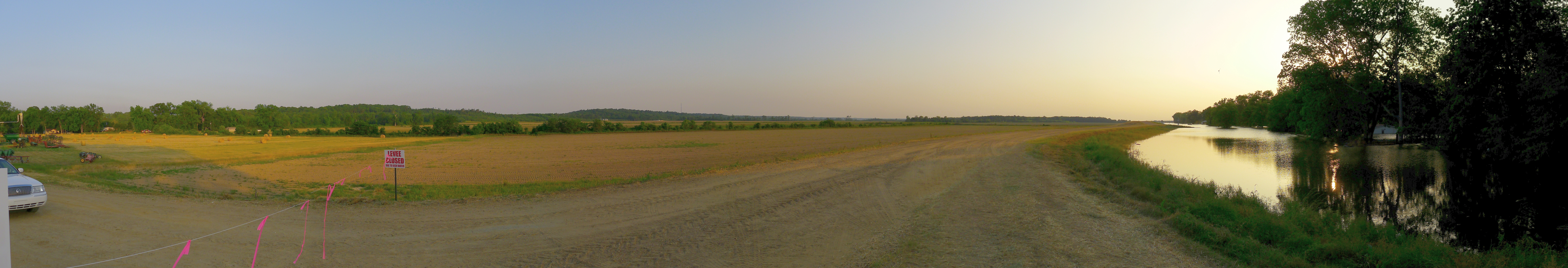
Looking west from Satartia in 2011; the Yazoo River has flooded the buildings to the right of the levee.

== Notable people ==
- Rod Barnes, college basketball coach
- Charles Read, Navy officer nicknamed "Seawolf of the Confederacy" for his exploits and daring.
