= Henry Espy =

American politician

Henry Espy was the Mayor of Clarksdale, Mississippi until 2013. He is the brother of former U.S. Secretary of Agriculture Mike Espy and father of former Mississippi state Representative and 2017 to 2025 Clarksdale mayor Chuck Espy, a Democrat of Clarksdale, Jaye Espy, Charisse Espy, and Paula Espy.

== Biography ==
Espy is the son of Henry Espy, Sr. and Willie Jean Huddleston of Yazoo City. Espy's grandfather, T. J. Huddleston, Sr., created the first hospital in Yazoo City, MS for African Americans.

Henry Espy was the first African American appointed to the school board in Clarksdale, MS. He went on to become the first African American to serve as a city commissioner and first African American mayor of Clarksdale. He has served as President of the US Conference of Black Mayors.

Espy is President of Century Funeral Home and Burial Association in Clarksdale and Yazoo City. The funeral home was created by his grandfather, T. J. Huddleston, Sr. His son Henry "Chuck" Espy, III served in the Mississippi State Legislature, representing the 26th District through 2016, and is the former mayor of Clarksdale (2017–2025). Chuck would decline to seek re-election as mayor of Clarksdale in 2025.
