= Yazoo County High School =

Public school in Mississippi, United States

Coordinates: 32.7816°N 90.3770°W

Location
- 191 Panther Drive; Yazoo City, (Yazoo County), Mississippi 39194; United States

Information
- Type: Public high school
- School district: Yazoo County School District
- Principal: Dwayne Proffit
- Staff: 37.01 (FTE)
- Enrollment: 417 (2023-2024)
- Student to teacher ratio: 11.27
- Colors: Navy and Carolina blue
- Mascot: Panthers
- Website: ychs.yazook12.org

Yazoo County High School (YCHS) is a public high school in unincorporated Yazoo County, Mississippi, near Yazoo City. It is a part of the Yazoo County School District.

It serves all areas of Yazoo County not in the city limits of Yazoo City. These areas include Benton, Bentonia, and Satartia.

== Notable alumni ==
- Kaleb Eulls (2009), football player
- Alexander Hollins (2014), football player
- Kenneth Gainwell (2018), football player

== See also ==
- Yazoo City High School
