= Yazoo County School District =

School district in Mississippi

- 94 Panther Drive Yazoo City, MS 39194

Other information
- Website: https://www.yazook12.org/

The Yazoo County School District (YCSD) is a public school district headquartered in unincorporated Yazoo County, Mississippi (USA), near Yazoo City.

The district serves areas of Yazoo County not in the Yazoo City city limits; its area includes the town of Bentonia, the village of Satartia, the census-designated place of Benton, the unincorporated area of Eden, and rural areas.

The district previously had its headquarters within the Yazoo City city limits.

== Schools ==
All schools are in unincorporated areas.

- Yazoo County High School
- Yazoo County Middle School
- Bentonia Gibbs Elementary School (Bentonia)
- Linwood Elementary School (Vaughan)

== Demographics ==
=== 2007-08 school year ===
There were a total of 1,763 students enrolled in the Yazoo County School District during the 2007–2008 school year. The gender makeup of the district was 48% female and 52% male. The racial makeup of the district was 52.13% African American, 47.14% White, 0.28% Hispanic, and 0.44% Asian.

=== Previous school years ===
School Year	Enrollment	Gender Makeup		Racial Makeup				
School Year	Enrollment	Female	Male	Asian	African American	Hispanic	Native American	White
2006-07	1,800	48%	52%	0.50%	52.78%	0.44%	–	46.28%
2005-06	1,875	49%	51%	0.64%	53.28%	0.27%	0.05%	45.76%
2004-05	1,865	49%	51%	0.32%	53.94%	0.27%	–	45.47%
2003-04	1,873	49%	51%	0.43%	55.53%	0.27%	–	43.78%
2002-03	1,811	49%	51%	0.39%	55.66%	0.39%	–	43.57%

== Accountability statistics ==
	2007-08	2006-07	2005-06	2004-05	2003-04	2002-03
District Accreditation Status	Accredited	Accredited	Accredited	Accredited	Accredited	Accredited
School Performance Classifications
Level 5 (Superior Performing) Schools	No School; Performance; Classifications; Assigned	1	1	1	1	0
Level 4 (Exemplary) Schools	No School; Performance; Classifications; Assigned	1	0	0	0	1
Level 3 (Successful) Schools	No School; Performance; Classifications; Assigned	2	3	3	3	2
Level 2 (Under Performing) Schools	No School; Performance; Classifications; Assigned	0	0	0	0	0
Level 1 (Low Performing) Schools	No School; Performance; Classifications; Assigned	0	0	0	0	0
Not Assigned	No School; Performance; Classifications; Assigned	0	0	0	0	0

== School uniforms ==
All students are required to wear school uniforms.

== See also ==
- List of school districts in Mississippi
