= Yazoo City, Mississippi =

City in Mississippi, United States

Yazoo City
- City
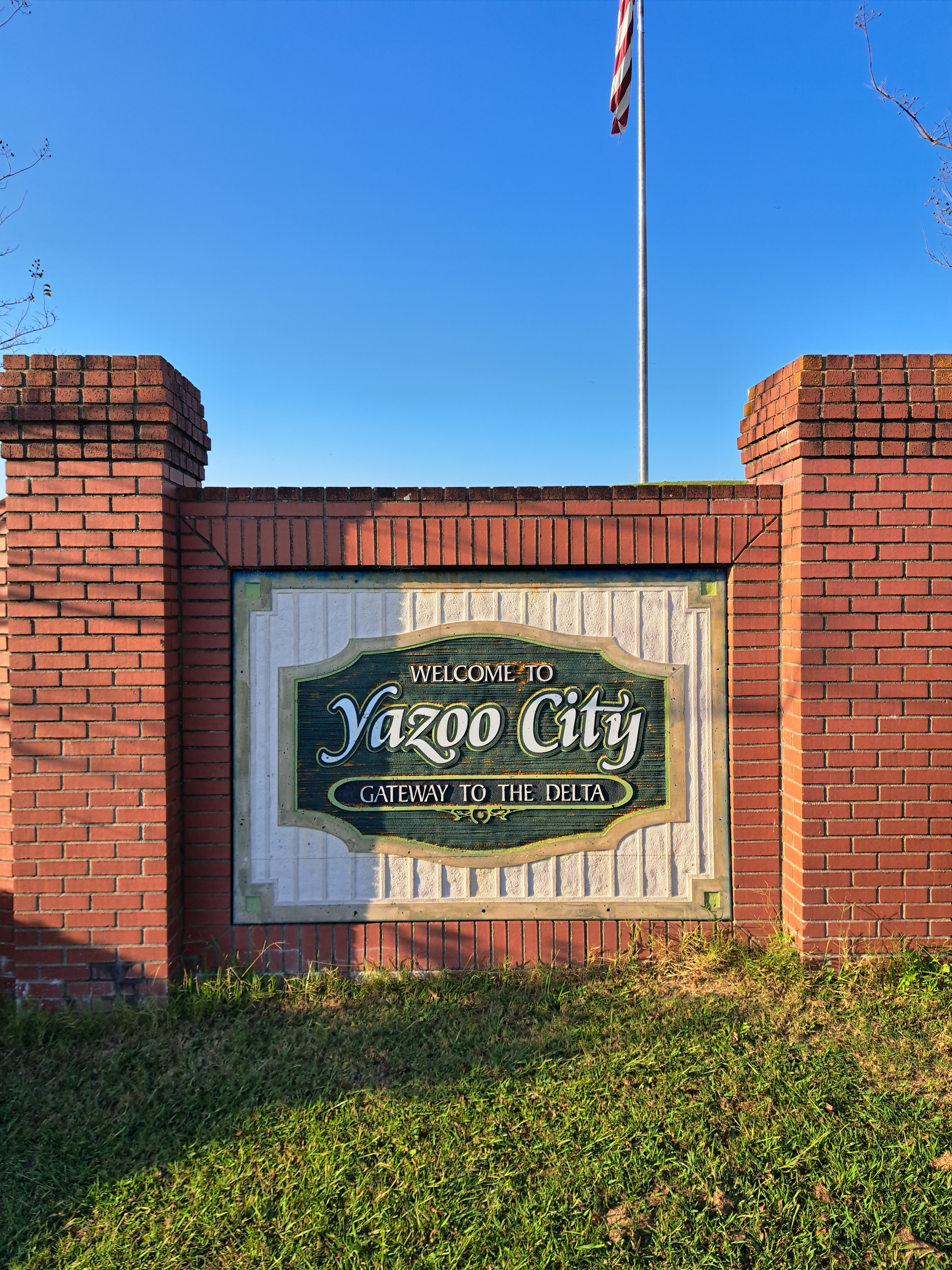
- Yazoo City welcome sign

- Logo
- Nickname: Gateway to the Delta
- Location of Yazoo City, Mississippi in Mississippi

- Location of Mississippi in the United States Yazoo City (the United States)
- Coordinates: 32°50′50″N 90°24′49″W
- Country: United States of America
- State: Mississippi
- County: Yazoo

Government
  - Mayor: Macklyn Austin (D)

Area
  - Total: 10.21 sq mi (26.44 km^{2})
  - Land: 10.08 sq mi (26.12 km^{2})
  - Water: 0.12 sq mi (0.32 km^{2})
- Elevation: 98 ft (30 m)

Population (2020)
  - Total: 10,316
  - Density: 1,023.0/sq mi (394.97/km^{2})
- Time zone: UTC−6 (Central (CST))
  - Summer (DST): UTC−5 (CDT)
- ZIP code: 39194
- Area code: 662
- FIPS code: 28-81520
- Website: City of Yazoo City

Yazoo City is a city in and the county seat of Yazoo County, Mississippi, United States. It was named after the Yazoo River, which, in turn was named by the French explorer Robert de La Salle in 1682 as "Rivière des Yazous" in reference to the Yazoo tribe living near the river's mouth. Yazoo City is the principal city of the Yazoo City Micropolitan Statistical Area, which is part of the larger Jackson–Yazoo City Combined Statistical Area. As of the 2020 census, Yazoo City had a population of 10,316.

== History ==
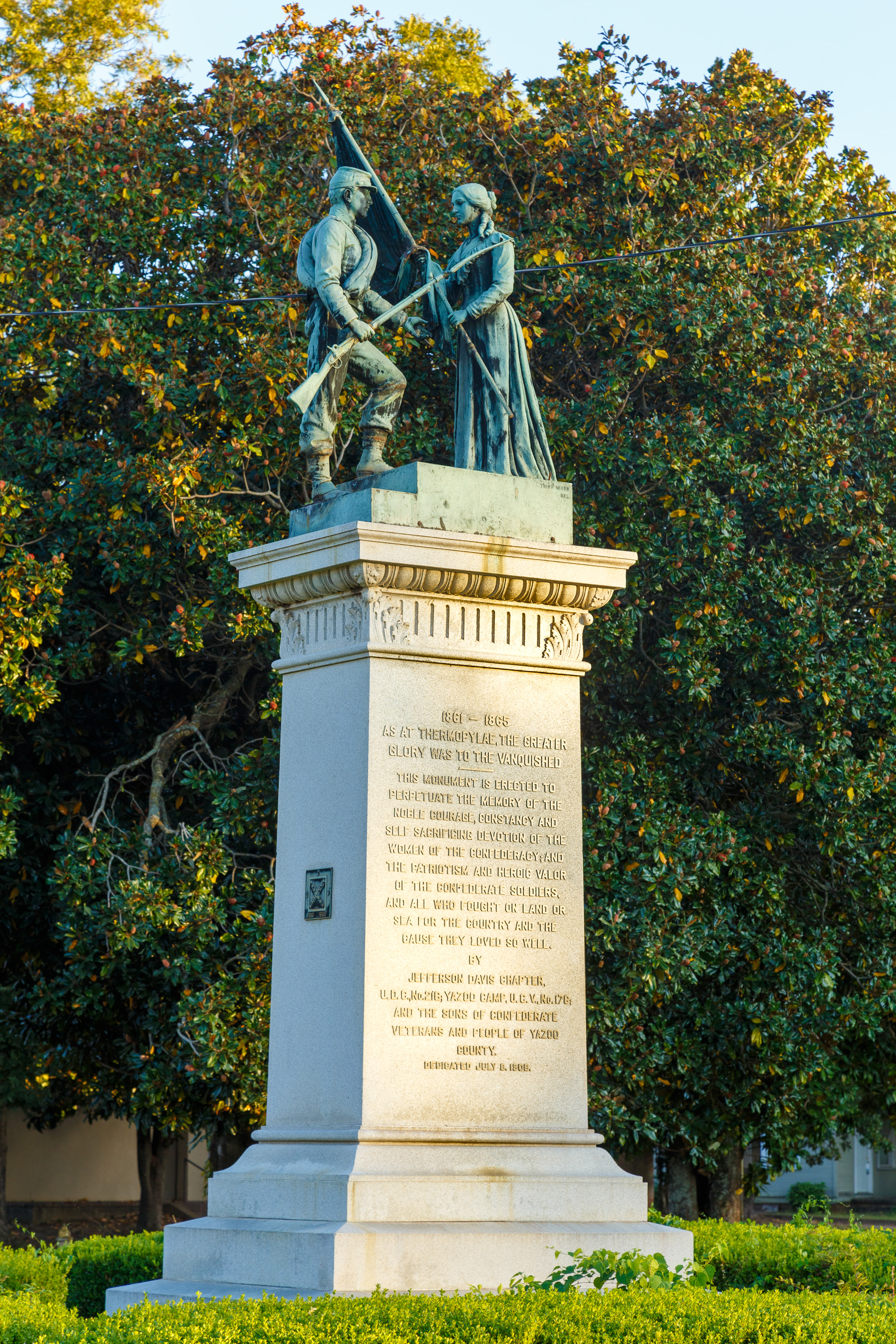
Confederate Monument

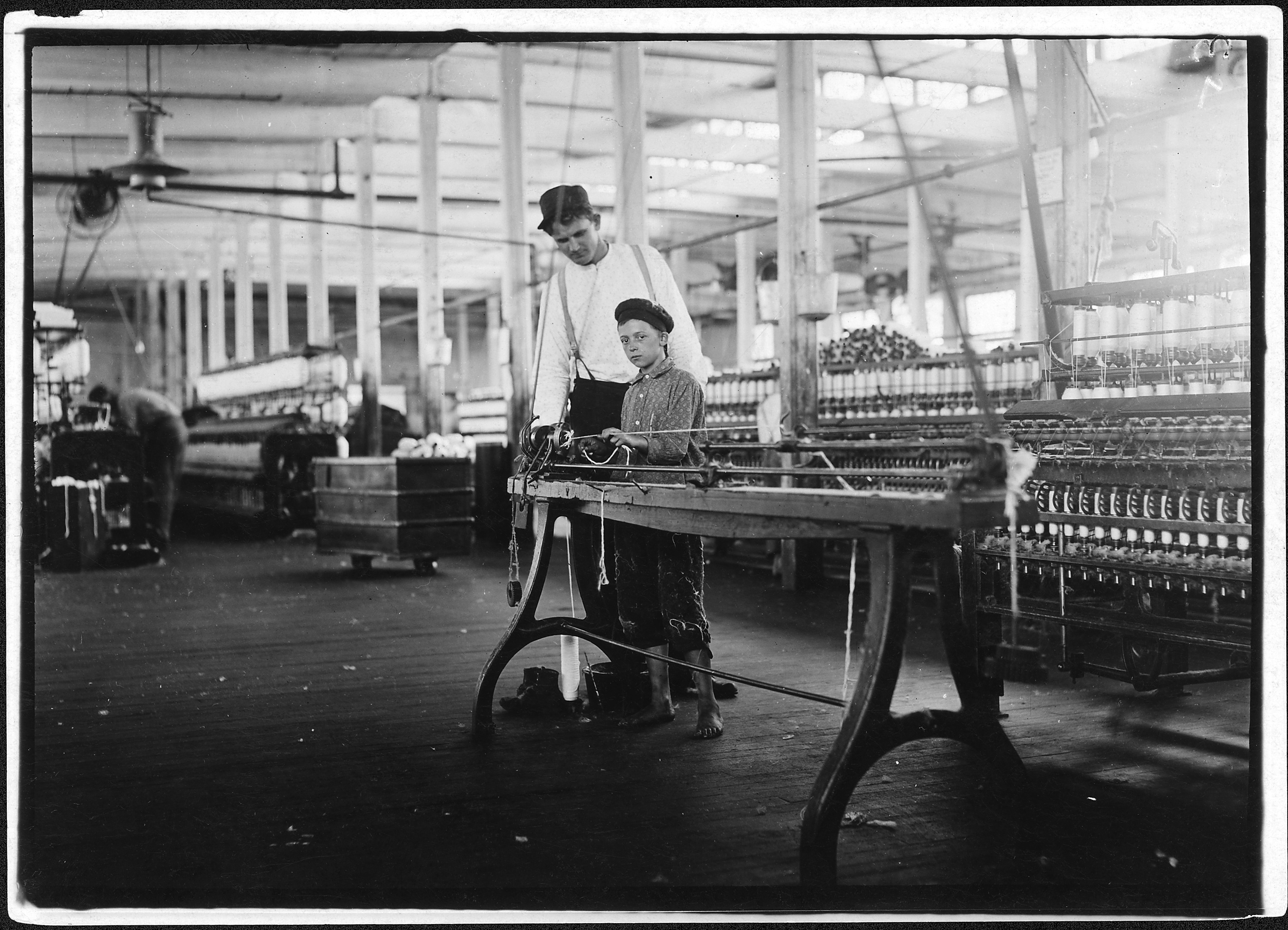
Child Labor in Yazoo City, 1911, photo by Lewis Hine

The community now known as Yazoo City was founded in 1824 with the name Hannan's Bluff. It was later renamed Manchester, then changed to Yazoo City in 1841. Yazoo City became the county seat in 1849. A yellow fever epidemic struck Yazoo City in 1853.

During the American Civil War, the Confederate ironclad CSS Arkansas was completed at a makeshift shipyard in Yazoo City after the Confederate loss of New Orleans and Memphis. During her short career, the Arkansas challenged the Union navy's control of the Mississippi River and helped avert the early fall of Vicksburg. On May 21, 1863, as a Union fleet steamed up the Yazoo River, the Confederate forces burned down the shipyard to keep their foes from capturing the vessels being built there. The Federal forces then burned down the sawmill and lumberyard before withdrawing. After their capture of Vicksburg in July 1863, another Union raid briefly occupied Yazoo City, but this time the Union ironclad USS Baron DeKalb was sunk by a mine. Federal troops occupied the town in September and again in October 1863. Another occupation resulted in the Battle of Yazoo City on March 5, 1864 between the Union troops and Confederates led by Robert V. Richardson and Lawrence Sullivan Ross. The Union troops held their ground but departed the following day. The Federal forces returned again on May 19, 1864, doing more damage to the town.

Yazoo City was rebuilt, but yellow fever struck and took more victims in 1878. On May 25, 1904, a fire destroyed much of central Yazoo City. According to a local legend, the fire was caused by a witch avenging her death. In reality, a boy playing with matches accidentally set a house ablaze. The fire quickly spread, and three-fourths of the town was destroyed, including most of the homes. It was stopped by a canal, which saved the new courthouse (built in 1872 to replace the one burned by the Union forces) and 10 antebellum homes nearby. The town took almost two years to recover.

In 1915, the Orr Modern Motor Car Company was founded in Yazoo City by G.A. Wilson and C.D. Orr, with capital of $2,000,000 (equivalent to $63,651,316 in 2025). Despite its name, the company was focused just on making Orr's innovative worm drive and assembled only one automobile as a prototype. Not long after, Orr shut its doors.

The Great Mississippi Flood of 1927 did much damage to the entire Delta, but Yazoo City was restored and is now protected by an effective flood-prevention system.

=== Tornado history ===
A strong tornado, rated EF4 on the Enhanced Fujita scale and with a path width of 1.75 mi (2.82 km), hit Yazoo County on April 24, 2010. Four people were killed in the Yazoo City area, and a number were seriously injured; four of the victims were airlifted to the University of Mississippi Medical Center in the capital city of Jackson, 40 mi (64 km) away. The governor of Mississippi, Haley Barbour, toured the area in a National Guard helicopter and held a news conference on the disaster at 3:30 pm. The tornado and the aftermath were shown in an episode of the Discovery Channel series Storm Chasers, and several YouTube videos show considerable detail and descriptions.

On November 29, 2010 around 8:05 pm local time, Yazoo City was struck by two EF2 tornadoes: the first one tracked 3 mi (4.8 km) southwest of town. The second went right through downtown causing significant damage to several buildings.

A high-end EF1 tornado passed through the southeast side of the city on May 2, 2021. Multiple mobile homes were destroyed and trees, power lines, and homes were damaged.

== Geography ==
Yazoo City is located 40 mi (64 km) northwest of Jackson at the junctions of U.S. Routes 49, 49E, and 49W, and MS Highways 3, 16, and 149, on the banks of the Yazoo River, near the Panther Swamp National Wildlife Refuge.

U.S. Route 49W provides a fairly direct link between Yazoo City and Belzoni. The old highway segment, renamed Mississippi Highway 149, passes through Panther Swamp National Wildlife Refuge and the communities of Louise and Midnight before reconnecting with the new US 49W at Silver City, 7 mi (11 km) south of Belzoni. The new highway makes the town of Carter so near, it might be considered for annexation by Yazoo City. Two bridges now cross the Yazoo River at Yazoo City.

The section of MS 3 in Yazoo City is called Haley Barbour Parkway. Barbour, the former governor of Mississippi, grew up in Yazoo City and has a home on Wolf Lake, a lake north of Yazoo City. U.S. Route 49 (part of which was formerly U.S. 49E) through Yazoo City is named Jerry Clower Boulevard, after the famous comedian, a former resident of Yazoo City.

Yazoo City is also known as the "Gateway to the Delta" due to its location on the transition between the two great landforms that characterize the geography of Mississippi (the western part of the city lies in the Mississippi Delta and the eastern part lies in the loess bluffs that characterize most of eastern Mississippi).

According to the United States Census Bureau, the city has a total area of 10.9 sq mi (28 km^{2}), of which 10.8 sq mi (28 km^{2}) is land and 0.1 sq mi (0.26 km^{2}) (1.19%) is covered by water.

=== Climate ===
Climate data for Yazoo City, Mississippi (1991–2020 normals, extremes 1960–2018)
Month	Jan	Feb	Mar	Apr	May	Jun	Jul	Aug	Sep	Oct	Nov	Dec	Year
Record high °F (°C)	84 (29)	92 (33)	91 (33)	94 (34)	98 (37)	102 (39)	106 (41)	106 (41)	103 (39)	96 (36)	89 (32)	86 (30)	106 (41)
Mean daily maximum °F (°C)	58.4 (14.7)	62.6 (17.0)	70.8 (21.6)	78.9 (26.1)	86.0 (30.0)	92.1 (33.4)	94.3 (34.6)	94.9 (34.9)	90.5 (32.5)	80.5 (26.9)	68.8 (20.4)	60.7 (15.9)	78.2 (25.7)
Daily mean °F (°C)	48.5 (9.2)	52.0 (11.1)	59.4 (15.2)	67.5 (19.7)	75.6 (24.2)	82.1 (27.8)	84.7 (29.3)	84.6 (29.2)	79.3 (26.3)	68.7 (20.4)	57.5 (14.2)	51.0 (10.6)	67.6 (19.8)
Mean daily minimum °F (°C)	38.6 (3.7)	41.4 (5.2)	48.0 (8.9)	56.1 (13.4)	65.1 (18.4)	72.1 (22.3)	75.1 (23.9)	74.4 (23.6)	68.2 (20.1)	57.0 (13.9)	46.1 (7.8)	41.2 (5.1)	56.9 (13.8)
Record low °F (°C)	−4 (−20)	4 (−16)	15 (−9)	28 (−2)	39 (4)	50 (10)	53 (12)	52 (11)	35 (2)	28 (−2)	18 (−8)	2 (−17)	−4 (−20)
Average precipitation inches (mm)	5.69 (145)	5.57 (141)	5.94 (151)	6.58 (167)	5.74 (146)	4.37 (111)	4.02 (102)	4.51 (115)	3.31 (84)	4.27 (108)	4.57 (116)	5.81 (148)	60.38 (1,534)
Average snowfall inches (cm)	0.1 (0.25)	0.0 (0.0)	0.0 (0.0)	0.0 (0.0)	0.0 (0.0)	0.0 (0.0)	0.0 (0.0)	0.0 (0.0)	0.0 (0.0)	0.0 (0.0)	0.0 (0.0)	0.0 (0.0)	0.1 (0.25)
Average precipitation days (≥ 0.01 in)	8.9	8.8	8.9	7.6	8.1	7.5	7.9	7.2	5.0	5.9	7.2	9.0	92.0
Average snowy days (≥ 0.1 in)	0.1	0.0	0.0	0.0	0.0	0.0	0.0	0.0	0.0	0.0	0.0	0.0	0.1
Source: NOAA

== Demographics ==
Historical population
Census	Pop.	Note	%±
1880	2,542		—
1890	3,286		29.3%
1900	4,944		50.5%
1910	6,796		37.5%
1920	5,244		−22.8%
1930	5,579		6.4%
1940	7,258		30.1%
1950	9,746		34.3%
1960	11,236		15.3%
1970	11,688		4.0%
1980	12,426		6.3%
1990	12,427		0.0%
2000	14,550		17.1%
2010	11,403		−21.6%
2020	10,316		−9.5%
U.S. Decennial Census

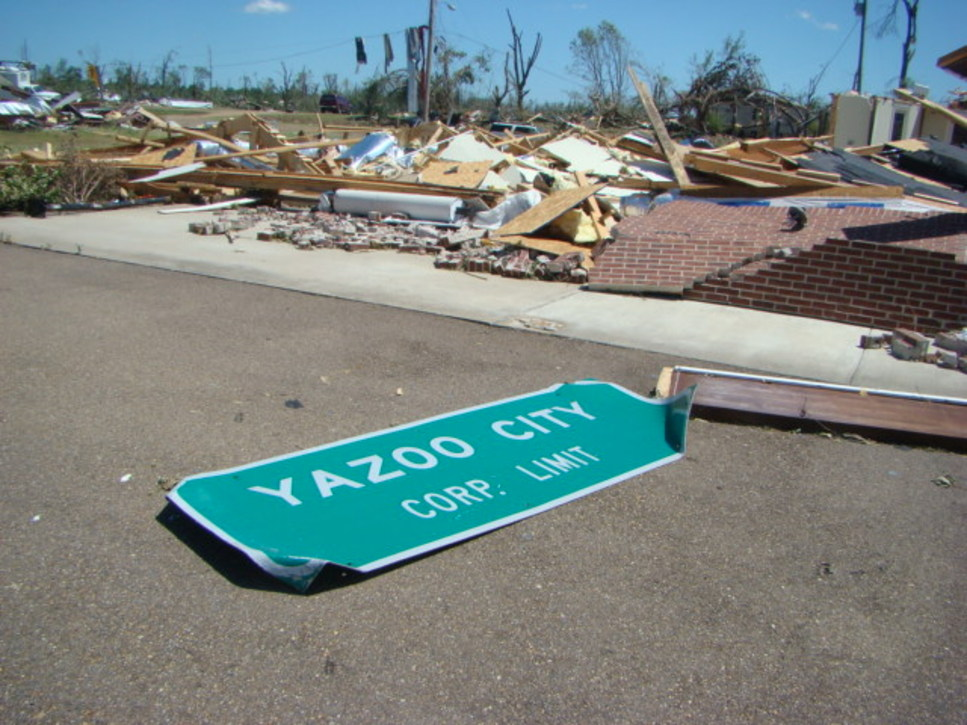
Yazoo City sign after April 24, 2010, tornado

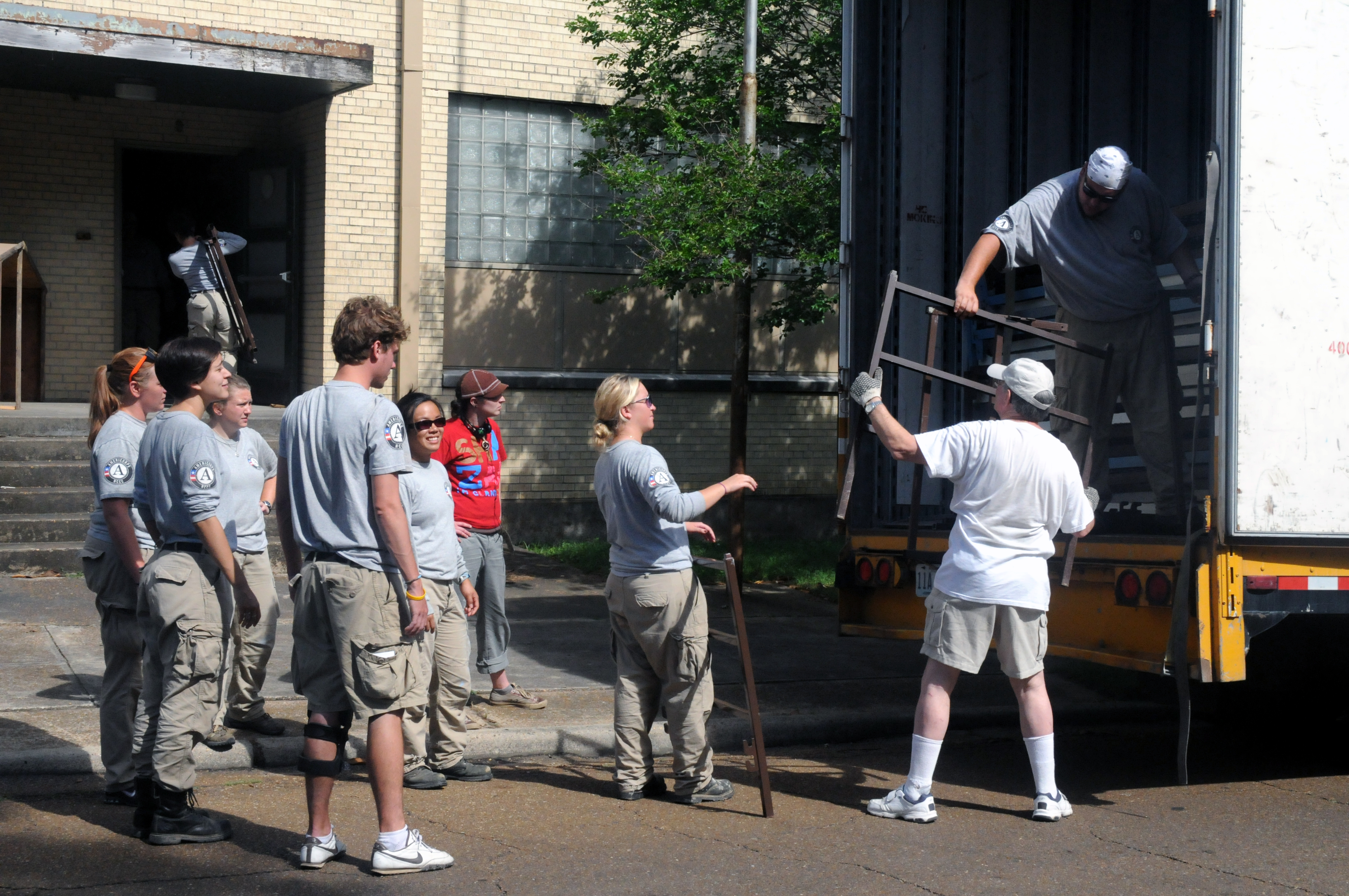
AmeriCorps volunteers cleaning up tornado damage, May 2010

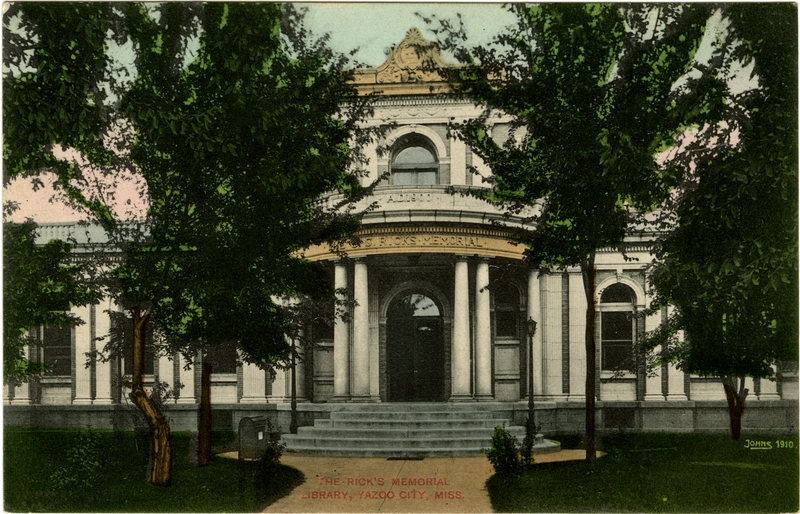
Ricks Memorial Library, Yazoo City

=== 2020 census ===
As of the 2020 census, Yazoo City had a population of 10,316. The median age was 35.6 years. 28.6% of residents were under the age of 18 and 14.4% of residents were 65 years of age or older. For every 100 females there were 82.0 males, and for every 100 females age 18 and over there were 74.4 males age 18 and over.

97.3% of residents lived in urban areas, while 2.7% lived in rural areas.

There were 3,913 households and 2,050 families in Yazoo City. Of all households, 35.7% had children under the age of 18 living in them, 20.4% were married-couple households, 21.1% were households with a male householder and no spouse or partner present, and 51.2% were households with a female householder and no spouse or partner present. About 32.7% of all households were made up of individuals and 12.6% had someone living alone who was 65 years of age or older.

There were 4,632 housing units, of which 15.5% were vacant. The homeowner vacancy rate was 2.6% and the rental vacancy rate was 9.5%.

Racial composition as of the 2020 census
Race	Number	Percent
White	1,143	11.1%
Black or African American	8,860	85.9%
American Indian and Alaska Native	6	0.1%
Asian	61	0.6%
Native Hawaiian and Other Pacific Islander	4	0.0%
Some other race	31	0.3%
Two or more races	211	2.0%
Hispanic or Latino (of any race)	76	0.7%

=== 2010 census ===
As of the 2010 United States census, there were 11,403 people living in the city. The racial makeup of the city was 82.0% Black, 16.1% White, 0.1% Native American, 0.5% Asian and 0.5% from two or more races. 0.7% were Hispanic or Latino of any race.

=== 2000 census ===
As of the census of 2000, 14,550 people, 4,271 households, and 2,968 families resided in the city. The population density was 1,349.2 inhabitants per square mile (520.9/km^{2}). The 4,676 housing units averaged 433.6 per mi^{2} (167.5/km^{2}). The racial makeup of the city was 28.73% White, 69.68% African American, 0.18% Native American, 0.58% Asian, 0.23% from other races, and 0.60% from two or more races. Hispanics or Latinos of any race were 7.47% of the population.

Of the 4,271 households, 37.7% had children under the age of 18 living with them, 31.5% were married couples living together, 32.6% had a female householder with no husband present, and 30.5% were not families. About 27.4% of all households were made up of individuals, and 13.4% had someone living alone who was 65 years of age or older. The average household size was 2.85 and the average family size was 3.49.

In the city, the population was distributed as 29.0% under the age of 18, 10.5% from 18 to 24, 31.3% from 25 to 44, 17.3% from 45 to 64, and 11.9% who were 65 years of age or older. The median age was 32 years. For every 100 females, there were 112.1 males. For every 100 females age 18 and over, there were 115.9 males.

The median income for a household in the city was $19,893, and for a family was $22,470. Males had a median income of $26,109 versus $18,650 for females. The per capita income for the city was $9,251. About 35.0% of families and 40.2% of the population were below the poverty line, including 52.5% of those under age 18 and 23.5% of those age 65 or over.

=== Jewish community ===
The Institute of Southern Jewish Life stated that the Jewish community has been characterized by assimilation and was "small, but influential". 44 Jews lived in the community in 1878, but a flood of the Mississippi River in 1882 meant that additional Jews displaced by the flood came. There were 61 Jews in the city by 1937. The Jews in the community did not create a congregation, and the nearest houses of worship were, in the mid-20th century, in Jackson and Greenwood.

== Economy ==
The Federal Bureau of Prisons operates the Federal Correctional Complex, Yazoo City, which consists of FCI Yazoo City Low, FCI Yazoo City Medium, FCI Camp, and FCI USP Yazoo City.

== Government ==
Diane Delaware was sworn in as the first female mayor of Yazoo City on April 14, 2014. She was re-elected to a second term on April 2, 2018.

Yazoo City's current mayor is David "Mel" Starling, who was sworn in on Monday, April 11, 2022.

The United States Postal Service operates the Yazoo City Post Office.

== Education ==
Yazoo City is served by the Yazoo City Municipal School District; Yazoo City High School is the public school of this district.

Yazoo County High School, outside of the city limits and a part of the Yazoo County School District, does not serve areas in the Yazoo City city limits.

The three private schools are Thomas Christian Academy (Pre-K–12), Manchester Academy (Pre-K–12), and Covenant Christian School (K–6th grade).

== Media ==
WBYP and WYAZ, both FM, are two local radio stations. The Yazoo Herald is Yazoo County's only daily newspaper.

== Infrastructure ==
=== Transportation ===
Amtrak, the national passenger rail system, provides service to Yazoo City using the Yazoo City Station. The Amtrak station is located at 222 West Broadway.

Yazoo County Airport is in unincorporated Yazoo County, 2 miles (3.2 km) west of central Yazoo City. Lynne W. Jeter of the Mississippi Business Journal said in 2001 that the county airport "may have played an important role in landing the multiphase federal prison project that is currently under expansion."

== Notable people ==
- Haley Barbour, former governor of Mississippi
- J. F. Barbour III, former Mayor of Yazoo City
- Alexander Boarman, Yazoo City native served as mayor of Shreveport, Louisiana, U.S. representative from Louisiana's 4th congressional district, and as a federal judge for 35 years until his death in 1916.
- Sister Thea Bowman, African American Catholic religious sister who was a notable Black Catholic leader in the second half of the 20th-century, considered a Servant of God by the Catholic Church, born in Yazoo City
- H. H. Brookins, AME Bishop
- Willie Brown (American football), Oakland Raiders, NFL Hall of Fame
- Deondre Burns (born 1997), basketball player in the Israeli Basketball Premier League
- Walter M. Chandler, Republican member of the US House of Representative, 19th district of New York
- James Paul Clarke, United States Senator and the 18th governor of Arkansas
- Jerry Clower, famous country comedian who spent more than 30 years as a resident of the town before moving back to the area he was born, Liberty, Mississippi, in 1988. Many of Clower's comical stories mention Yazoo City.
- Lawrence Owen Cooper Sr., founder of Mississippi Chemical Corporation and past president of Southern Baptist Convention
- Fletcher Cox, Philadelphia Eagles All-Pro defensive lineman
- Mike Espy, Secretary of Agriculture (1993–94); U.S. House of Representatives, 2nd district of Mississippi (1987–93)
- Kaleb Eulls, NFL Player
- W. C. Friley, 19th-century Baptist clergyman in Yazoo City; later president of two Baptist colleges
- Kenneth Gainwell, Running Back Philadelphia Eagles 2021 5th Round draft pick 150th overall. Cousin to Fletcher Cox
- Lawrence Gordon, film producer (Die Hard)
- Lynn Hamilton, actress
- Michael Henderson, R&B singer
- T. J. Huddleston, Sr., entrepreneur
- Wardell Jackson, professional basketball player
- Mary Johnson, blues singer and one-time wife of Lonnie Johnson
- Tommy McClennan, blues musician
- Patrick Claiborne Meagher, member of the Mississippi House of Representatives (1916–1920)
- Mike Miley, MLB player and Louisiana State University quarterback
- L.T. Miller, first medical director of the Afro-American Hospital and co-founder of the Mississippi Medical and Surgical Association
- William Joseph Mills, Governor of the New Mexico Territory
- Willie Morris, writer who grew up in Yazoo City
- Jerry Moses, MLB player
- Norman Albert Mott, member of the Mississippi Legislature (1911)
- Michael Passons, "Contemporary Christian Musician", founding former member of the Christian music group Avalon
- Robert Petway, blues musician
- Joseph A. Redding, US Army major general who commanded the 39th Infantry Division in the 1950s
- Bertha Schaefer, Modernist Interior Decorator, Gallerist, and designer. Born and educated in Yazoo.
- Stella Stevens, actress
- Pecolia Warner, 20th-century quiltmaker
- James Wheaton, actor, spent his adolescent years in Yazoo City, and graduated from high school there
- Zig Ziglar, personal development speaker and trainer
