= Yazoo City High School =

Location
- 1825 Martin Luther King Drive; Yazoo City, Mississippi 39194; United States

Information
- Type: Public
- School district: Yazoo City Municipal School District
- Principal: Dr. Sharon Brown (2024–present)
- Teaching staff: 29.90 (FTE)
- Grades: 9–12
- Enrollment: 537 (2023-2024)
- Student to teacher ratio: 17.96
- Colors: Red and black
- Mascot: Indians
- Website: www.yazoocity.k12.ms.us/o/ychs

Yazoo City High School is a public high school in Yazoo City, Mississippi. It is within the Yazoo City Municipal School District.

As of 2024 its enrollment is about 600 pupils.

== History ==
Like most public schools in Mississippi, Yazoo City High School was segregated until the 1960s. Yazoo City High School was historically an all-white school, while Blacks attended Yazoo High School #2.

== Notable alumni ==
- Willie Morris (1952), author
- Fletcher Cox (2009), former NFL defensive tackle for the Philadelphia Eagles
- J. F. Barbour III (1958), former mayor of Yazoo City; pioneer in re-establishing Republican Party in Mississippi
- Haley Barbour (1965), former governor of Mississippi
- Mike Espy (1971), former U.S. Secretary of Agriculture; Congressman

== See also ==
- Yazoo City, Mississippi
