= Yazoo City Municipal School District =

School district in Mississippi

Address
- 1133 Calhoun Avenue Yazoo City, Mississippi; United States

District information
- NCES District ID: 2804770

Students and staff
- Students: 1888
- Teachers: 116.67 FTE

Other information
- Website: www.yazoocity.k12.ms.us

The Yazoo City Municipal School District is a public school district based in Yazoo City, Mississippi.

The district boundaries parallel that of Yazoo City.

== History ==
In 2019, the school district was taken over by the Mississippi Department of Education and was placed into the Mississippi Achievement School District. The district is still considered a separate entity.

== Schools ==
- Yazoo City High School
- Woolfolk Middle School
- McCoy Elementary School
- Webster Elementary School

== Demographics ==
=== 2007-08 school year ===
There were a total of 2,822 students enrolled in the Yazoo City Municipal School District during the 2007–2008 school year. The gender makeup of the district was 49% female and 51% male. The racial makeup of the district was 99.17% African American, 0.54% White, 0.07% Native American, 0.14% Hispanic, and 0.07% Asian.

=== Previous school years ===
School Year	Enrollment	Gender Makeup		Racial Makeup				
School Year	Enrollment	Female	Male	Asian	African American	Hispanic	Native American	White
2006-07	2,822	49%	51%	0.07%	99.08%	0.07%	0.14%	0.64%
2005-06	2,834	50%	50%	0.07%	98.94%	0.14%	0.14%	0.71%
2004-05	2,845	50%	50%	0.14%	98.66%	0.25%	0.14%	0.81%
2003-04	2,893	50%	50%	0.28%	98.31%	0.10%	0.10%	1.21%
2002-03	2,939	49%	51%	0.34%	97.55%	0.37%	0.10%	1.63%

== Accountability statistics ==
	2007-08	2006-07	2005-06	2004-05	2003-04	2002-03
District Accreditation Status	Advised	Accredited	Accredited	Accredited	Accredited	Accredited
School Performance Classifications
Level 5 (Superior Performing) Schools	No School; Performance; Classifications; Assigned	0	0	0	0	0
Level 4 (Exemplary) Schools	No School; Performance; Classifications; Assigned	0	0	0	0	0
Level 3 (Successful) Schools	No School; Performance; Classifications; Assigned	1	1	1	1	0
Level 2 (Under Performing) Schools	No School; Performance; Classifications; Assigned	2	2	2	2	1
Level 1 (Low Performing) Schools	No School; Performance; Classifications; Assigned	0	0	0	0	1
Not Assigned	No School; Performance; Classifications; Assigned	0	1	1	1	2

== See also ==
- List of school districts in Mississippi
- Yazoo County School District
