= H. H. Brookins =

Methodist bishop

- Born: Hamel Hartford Brookins; June 8, 1925; Yazoo City, Mississippi, U.S.
- Died: May 22, 2012 (aged 86); Los Angeles, California, U.S.
- Occupations: Clergyman, bishop, community leader
- Years active: 1950–2012
- Family: Frank Wheaton (second cousin once removed); Jesse E. Holmes (granduncle); James Wheaton (second cousin)

Hamel Hartford Brookins better known as H. H. Brookins (June 8, 1925 – May 22, 2012) was an American bishop of the African Methodist Episcopal Church, community leader, and political powerbroker.

== Biography ==
Brookins was born on June 8, 1925, in Yazoo City, Mississippi. He was the eighth of ten children born to Samuel and Lena (Holmes) Brookins. His parents were sharecroppers. He is the grandnephew of Jesse E. Holmes, a prominent clergyman and community leader in Mississippi during the turn of the 20th century.

He briefly attended Campbell College in Jackson, Mississippi. He continued his education in Ohio, where he obtained degrees at two colleges. At Wilberforce University, Brookins earned a Bachelor of Arts degree. At Payne Theological Seminary, he obtained a Bachelor of Divinity degree.

After graduating from Payne, he received early assignments as a minister at various churches in Kansas including a stint in Topeka. This was around the time of the groundbreaking U.S. Supreme Court Case Brown vs. Board of Education which challenged the doctrine of “separate but equal” in Topeka's public schools.

As the first Black president of an interracial ministerial council in Wichita, Kansas, he helped make court-ordered school desegregation a reality.

In 1959, Brookins became pastor of First A.M.E. Church in Los Angeles, the city's oldest Black church and the domination's largest and most influential church in the West. He replaced Dr. J. D. Powell, who had led the congregation since 1952. It was under the leadership of Brookins that the church's multi-million-dollar cathedral was built.

When Brookins announced his plans to build a new church, even members of his own congregation expressed doubts that it could come to fruition. His efforts were aided considerablely by philanthropist John Factor, who was introduced to him by James Roosevelt in appreciation of his help during his unsuccessful campaign for Mayor of Los Angeles in 1965. An early contribution by Factor was instrumental in Brookins securing the land for the new structure.

In the early 1960s, he organized Dr. Martin Luther King, Jr.’s first visit to Los Angeles which drew a crowd of over 60,000 people.

At First A.M.E., Brookins's influence grew, and he began taking a more active role in politics. In 1961, when a White person,Joe E. Hollingsworth was appointed to fill a vacancy in the 10th district of the Los Angeles City Council over sixteen Black candidates (including Tom Bradley), in one of the mot heavily Black districts in the city, Brookins organized an unsuccessful recall campaign. Undaunted, Brookins encouraged Bradley, a member of his congregation, to run for the Los Angeles City Council in 1963, Bradley was elected. Bradley became mayor a few years later. He was also an advisor to former U.S. Representative Diane Watson, providing critical support early in her political career.

As a community leader, Brookins was not shy about expressing his support or opposition to political candidates, voting initiatives, and other proposals impacting the Black community, such as school desegregation.

In 1972, he was elected bishop where he was assigned to the 17th District which included Malawi, Rhodesia, Tanzania, Zaire, and Zambia. During his tenure in the African continent he helped build hundreds of homes and helped mediate many local disputes. In Rhodesia, Brookins was kicked out of the country for opposing the White minority controlled government.

Back in the United States, Brookins was later assigned to the 12 District which included Arkansas. While there, Brookins befriended Bill Clinton, who would be elected governor prior to running for US President. He was also an advisor to Jesse Jackson during his 1984 presidential campaign.

Later in life, his reputation was tarnished by accusations of financial impropriety. Although he was never formerly charged of any crime, he was given less favorable assignments later in his career. He retired in 2004. He died in Los Angeles on May 22, 2012.

== Family ==
Brookins is survived by three children including a daughter, Francine Brookins, who was elected a bishop of the A.M.E. Church in 2021.
