= Jesse E. Holmes =

American minister and community leader

- Born: Jesse Elmer Holmes; October 1857; Yazoo County, Mississippi, U.S.
- Died: April 22, 1921 (aged 63); Gulfport, Mississippi, U.S.
- Other names: J.E. Holmes, Jesse Holmes, Jr.
- Occupations: Minister, farmer, community leader
- Spouse: Susie Ernestine Holmes (m. 1882)
- Children: 7
- Relatives: James Wheaton (grandson); Frank K. Wheaton (great-grandson); H. H. Brookins (grandnephew)

Rev. Jesse Elmer Holmes (1857–1921) was a prominent minister and community leader in Mississippi during the late 19th century and early 20th century.

== Biography ==
Jesse Elmer Holmes was born in October 1857 in Yazoo County, Mississippi, as the youngest child of Jesse and Delia (Meyers) Holmes. He was educated in local schools. Like his father, the younger Holmes was a farmer. He was also a pastor with the Methodist Episcopal Church, beginning his career in the Yazoo City area. A conservative, he was well-respected as both a civic and religious leader by whites as well as blacks.

Sometime during the middle of the first decade of the 20th century, Rev. Holmes relocated to the Mississippi Gulf Coast with his family and at various times lived in Ocean Springs, Bay Saint Louis, and Gulfport. He was a much sought after public speaker who would appear at a wide variety of events including fundraisers, blood drives, community forums, and graduations.

In 1917, as the United States was on the verge of entering World War I, reports were appearing on the Associated Press that questioned African American loyalty to the flag. As a way to reassure the larger community, Rev. Holmes along with Rev. H. H. Lowe, pastor of 1st Baptist Church and G. W. Brown, principal of the black public school, spoke at a large assembly at the county courthouse in Bay Saint Louis, which culminated in a resolution declaring that the African American citizens of the community were loyal to the federal government.

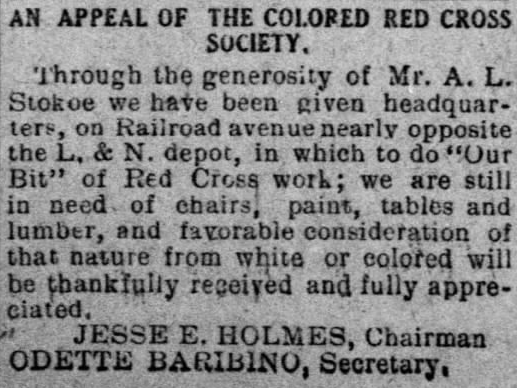
Advertisement from the Colored Red Cross which appeared in The Sea Coast Echo (Bay Saint Louis, Mississippi) on 8 September 1917

Later that year, Rev. Holmes was elected chairman of the Colored Red Cross chapter in Bay Saint Louis. His wife, Susie, served on the executive committee.

In 1919, Rev. Holmes was assigned to St. Mark M. E. Church in Gulfport, where he would serve for the remainder of his life.

In the beginning of 1921, when a white man only identified as Judge Mayo (possibly Martin A. Mayo, a once prominent attorney from Chicago) spoke to a group of black leaders in Gulfport, it caused quite a stir within the larger community. During his speech Mayo was advocating among other things that black people should fight for “social equality.” In response to an article published about the meeting in the Biloxi Daily Herald, Rev. Holmes (who attended the meeting in question) wrote that Mayo “did touch along the lines of colored people riding in public conveyances and dining in some hotels beyond the Mason & Dixon line; but that was no news to us for many of us who are here in Gulfport today have experienced it and we didn’t like it!”

In the same letter Rev. Holmes went on to argue that the primary reason that blacks were leaving the South (which would be later described as the Great Migration) was driven more by a desire to escape violence perpetrated on them by whites, than to escape segregation. He wrote:

The thing that is driving negroes North is not the desire for social equality, but it is the good white people allowing the bad white people to burn us poor defenseless negroes on stakes and hang us to telephone poles and from the beams of bridges.

Just a few weeks later, Rev. Holmes died at his home in Gulfport on Friday, 22 April 1921. In his obituary, which appeared in multiple area newspapers, it said about him, “He was a builder in the very essence of the word, and his death removes from every day life one of the colored leaders of the State who stood for the industrial uplift and moral development of the colored people.”

His funeral was officiated by Bishop Robert E. Jones, who had recently become one of the first two African Americans appointed to that position in the Methodist Episcopal Church. He was assisted by many pastors from around Mississippi and the Gulf Coast region. The funeral was well attended.

== Personal life ==
Mr. Holmes married Miss Susie E. Holmes on 21 May 1882 in Yazoo County, Mississippi. This union produced six children including a child, who died in infancy.
