= Frank K. Wheaton =

American attorney

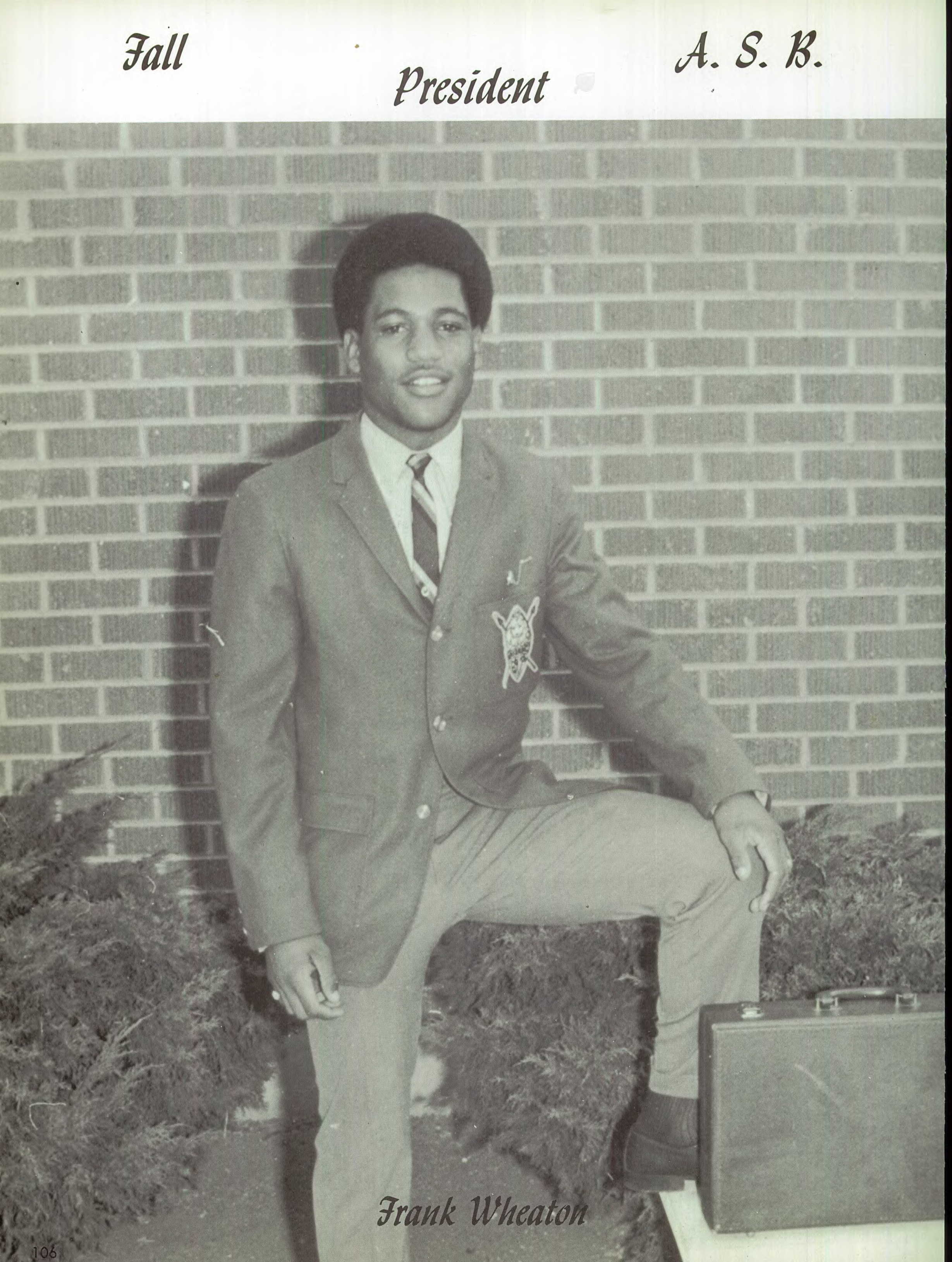
- Frank Wheaton in 1968
- Born: Frankert Kahlil Wheaton; September 27, 1951 (age 74); Los Angeles, California, U.S.
- Education: California State University, Northridge; University of West Los Angeles
- Spouses: Jean Carn (divorced); Robin Green (divorced); Jennifer Jones
- Father: James Wheaton
- Family: Jesse E. Holmes (great-grandfather); T. D. Jakes (second cousin once removed); H. H. Brookins (second cousin once removed)

Frankert Kahlil Wheaton is an American attorney, agent, and actor.

== Biography ==
Wheaton was born September 27, 1951, in Los Angeles, California, but raised in nearby Compton. He is the son of James Wheaton.

In 1969, Wheaton graduated from Centennial High School in Compton where he served as senior class president and was voted "most popular" in the senior class poll. He attended Willamette University in Salem, Oregon, before transferring to Cal State Northridge, where he received a degree in broadcasting. Upon graduation, Frank began working at KPFK and other radio stations in the Los Angeles area. Eventually, he relocated to the East Coast, where he added acting and modeling to his resume. On September 23, 1975, he married vocalist Jean Carn in Washington, D.C. They later divorced. He received a JD degree from the University of West Los Angeles in 1982, and was admitted to the Indiana State Bar in 1987.

Wheaton founded The Management Group Sports/Entertainment Representatives in 1984. There he began acting as an agent to actors and sports figures, specializing in securing product endorsements and producing special events such as the Michael Jordan Celebrity Golf Tournament for the United Negro College Fund and working with Milton Berle on the Ruth Berle Celebrity Golf Tournament for the benefit of the American Cancer Society. For several years, Wheaton served on the board of the Black Entertainment and Sports Lawyers Association (BESLA).

Wheaton has also served as a producer of sports-related programming. He was an executive producer of an hour-long special entitled, "Sports Greats:One on One with David Hartman" which aired on ESPN.

In 2001, he made an unsuccessful bid to unseat incumbent Compton, California City Councilmember Yvonne Arceneaux. After forcing Arceneaux into a runoff, Wheaton lost by only 1,819 votes in the general election.

As an attorney, he has represented Essie Mae Washington-Williams, the interracial daughter of US Senator Strom Thurmond, and Alfred Jackson, the half-brother of the musician Prince.
