= Norman Albert Mott =

American politician (1855–1920)

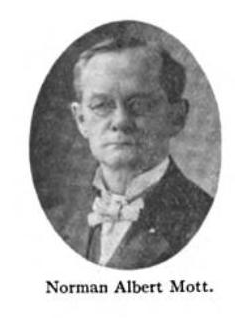

Member of the Mississippi House of Representatives from the Yazoo County district
- In office January 1912 – January 1916
- Governor: Earl L. Brewer

Member of the Board of Aldermen of Yazoo City, Mississippi
- In office April 1909 – 1911

Personal details
- Born: April 4, 1855 Alburgh, Vermont
- Died: July 16, 1920 (aged 65) Yazoo City, Mississippi
- Party: Democratic Party
- Spouse(s): Sue Wingfield Everett, m. November 25, 1884.
- Children: Everett H. Norman A. Jr. Walter Kellog Mott
- Occupation: Newspaper publisher
- Committees: Ways and Means; Municipalities; Liquor Traffic; Investigation of State Officers

Norman Albert Mott (April 4, 1855 – July 16, 1920) was an American politician who served as a member of the Mississippi House of Representatives from 1912 to 1916.

== Early life ==
Mott was born in Alburgh, Vermont to Nichols and Amanda (Chilton) Mott. Mr. Mott and his 2 brothers were orphaned at a young age. His father died in 1856 and his mother in 1863. He was raised by his grandmother Phoebe Deuel Chilton in Vermont until he moved south for health reasons.

While a member of the Mississippi Legislature, Mott served as Chairman of the Investigation of State Officers committee and was a member of the Ways and Means, Municipalities, and Liquor Traffic committees. He was also a publisher of the Yazoo Herald, a newspaper in Yazoo City, Mississippi and the Belzoni Item. The Yazoo Herald remained in the Mott family from 1914 until 1978. He served as president of the Farmers' Union in Mississippi and belonged to the fraternal organization Woodmen of the World.
