= Fletcher Cox =

American football player (born 1990)

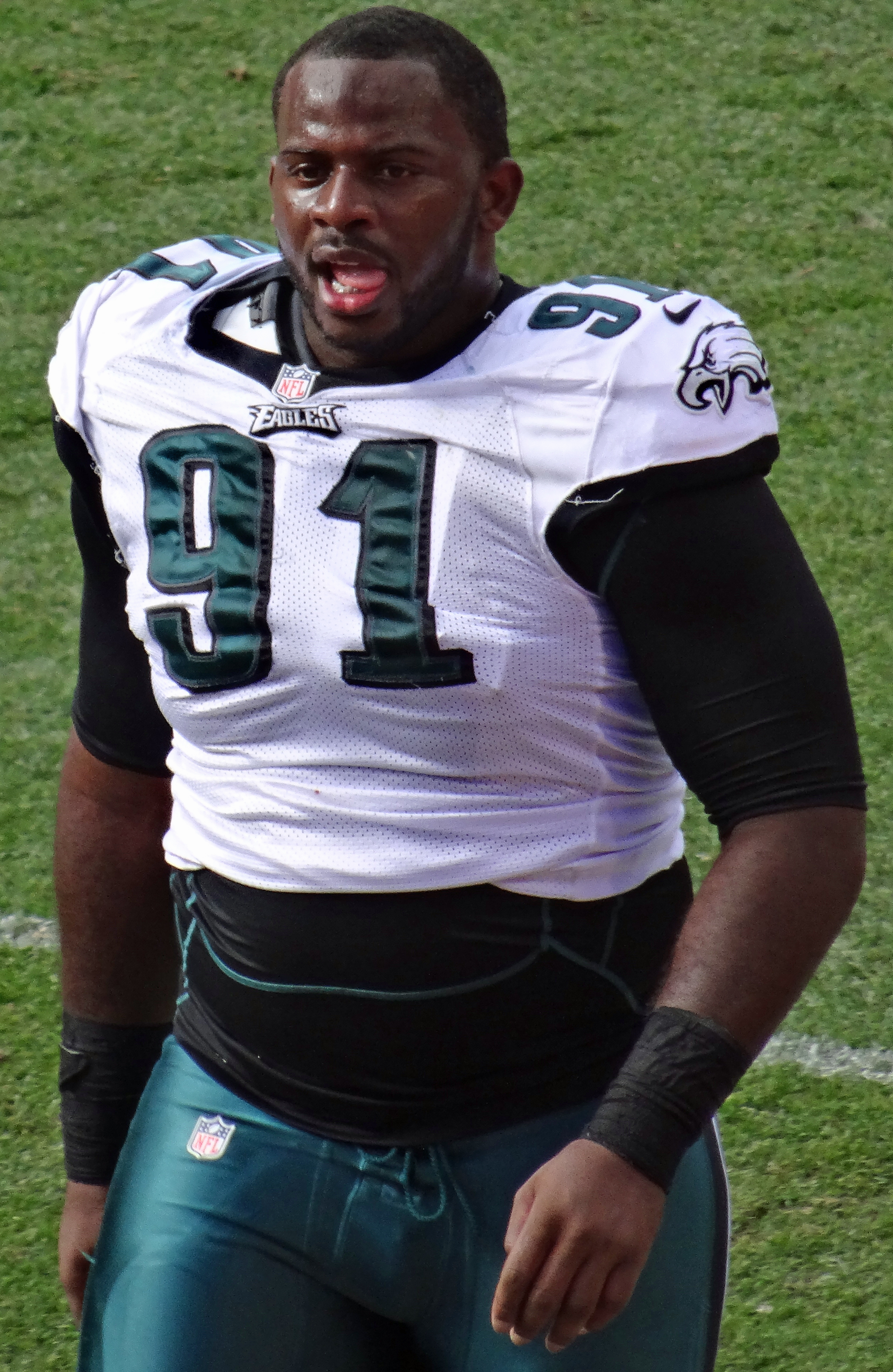
- Cox with the Philadelphia Eagles in 2013

No. 91
- Position: Defensive tackle

Personal information
- Born: December 13, 1990 (age 35); Yazoo City, Mississippi, U.S.
- Listed height: 6 ft 4 in (1.93 m)
- Listed weight: 310 lb (141 kg)

Career information
- High school: Yazoo City
- College: Mississippi State (2009–2011)
- NFL draft: 2012: 1st round, 12th overall pick

Career history
- Philadelphia Eagles (2012–2023)

Awards and highlights
- Super Bowl champion (LII); First-team All-Pro (2018); 3× Second-team All-Pro (2014, 2015, 2017); 6× Pro Bowl (2015–2020); NFL 2010s All-Decade Team; PFWA All-Rookie Team (2012); First-team All-American (2011); First-team All-SEC (2011); Mississippi State M-Club Hall of Fame (2026)

Career NFL statistics
- Total tackles: 519
- Sacks: 70
- Forced fumbles: 16
- Fumble recoveries: 14
- Pass deflections: 16
- Defensive touchdowns: 3
- Stats at Pro Football Reference

Fletcher Cox (born December 13, 1990) is an American former professional football player who was a defensive tackle for 12 seasons with the Philadelphia Eagles of the National Football League (NFL). He played college football for the Mississippi State Bulldogs, and was selected by the Eagles in the first round of the 2012 NFL draft. During his career, Cox won a Super Bowl, was selected to the Pro Bowl six times, and was named an All-Pro four times.

== Early life ==
Cox attended Yazoo City High School in Yazoo City, Mississippi. He played football, basketball, and was on the track and field team. He competed in the high jump and in the relays. At the 2009 Division 3-4A Meet, he placed eighth in the high jump event, with a leap of 1.74 meters. In relays, he had personal best times of 44.32 seconds in the 4 × 100m relay and 1:32.63 minutes in the 4 × 200m relay. He was credited with a 4.47 time in the 40-yard dash, and benched 300 lb. As a senior, he had 104 tackles including 10 quarterback sacks. He also had an interception and a fumble recovery. He was selected to play in the Mississippi-Alabama High School All-Star game.

Regarded as a four-star recruit by Rivals.com, Cox was rated as being the fifth-best weak side defensive end in the country, the second-best prospect in Mississippi, and the 17th-best defensive end prospect in the country by Scout.com. He chose to attend Mississippi State over scholarship offers from LSU, Alabama, Auburn, and Ole Miss.

== College career ==
Cox played football for three seasons at Mississippi State University. He was named an All-American by Pro Football Weekly as a junior in 2011, after making 56 total tackles and five sacks. He had two interceptions, of which one was for a touchdown. After the season, he declared for the 2012 NFL draft, forgoing his senior season.

== Professional career ==
Pre-draft measurables
Height	Weight	Arm length	Hand span	Wingspan	40-yard dash	10-yard split	20-yard split	20-yard shuttle	Three-cone drill	Vertical jump	Broad jump	Bench press
6 ft 4 in (1.93 m)	298 lb (135 kg)	34 1/2 in (0.88 m)	10 3/8 in (0.26 m)	6 ft 8 1/4 in (2.04 m)	4.79 s	1.66 s	2.82 s	4.53 s	7.07 s	26.0 in (0.66 m)	9 ft 0 in (2.74 m)	30 reps
All values from NFL Combine/Pro Day

=== 2012 season ===
The Philadelphia Eagles traded up from the 15th selection to select Cox with the 12th overall pick in the first round of the 2012 NFL draft. He is the highest selected Mississippi State Bulldog since Michael Haddix in 1983, and the highest selected Bulldog defensive lineman since Jimmy Webb in 1975. Cox was signed to a four-year contract on June 18, 2012.

On October 14, 2012, Cox was ejected after throwing punches at Detroit Lions players, and was fined $21,000. During his rookie year in 2012, he played 15 games and finished with 39 tackles, 5.5 sacks, four passes defended, and one forced fumble. He was named to the PFWA All-Rookie Team.

=== 2013 season ===
With the Eagles switching to playing a 3–4 type defense in 2013, Cox played defensive end. In 2013, he started all 16 games and finished with 44 tackles, three sacks, three passes defended, and one fumble recovery.

=== 2014 season ===
In the 2014 regular season opener for the Eagles, Cox had a 17-yard defensive fumble return for a touchdown in the 34–17 victory over the Jacksonville Jaguars. In Week 13, against the Seahawks, he had a career high 11 total tackles in the 24–14 loss. The 2014 season was a breakout year for Cox, acquiring 61 tackles, four sacks, one forced fumble, and three fumble recoveries in 16 games. His presence along the Eagles defensive line led to league-wide recognition and Second-team All-Pro honors.

=== 2015 season ===
On April 27, 2015, the Eagles picked up his 5th year option, keeping him with the team through the 2016 season. In a matchup against the New Orleans Saints in Week 5 of the 2015 season, Cox recorded a career-high three sacks and two forced fumbles. For his game against the Saints, he earned National Football Conference (NFC) Defensive Player of the Week.

Cox finished the 2015 season with 71 tackles, 9.5 sacks, two passes defended, and three forced fumbles. For his efforts, he received Second-team All-Pro honors and was selected to the Pro Bowl for the first time in his career. He received the Ed Block Courage Award. He was ranked 49th on the NFL Top 100 Players of 2016.

=== 2016 season ===
In 2016, the Eagles reverted to a 4–3 scheme, leading to Cox switching back to defensive tackle. On June 13, 2016, Cox signed a six-year, $103 million extension with the Eagles with $63 million guaranteed. He was named NFC Defensive Player of the Month for September. He finished the 2016 season with 6.5 sacks, 43 total tackles, two passes defended, and one forced fumble. As a result of a successful 2016 season, Cox was named to his second consecutive Pro Bowl. He was ranked 38th by his peers on the NFL Top 100 Players of 2017.

=== 2017 season ===
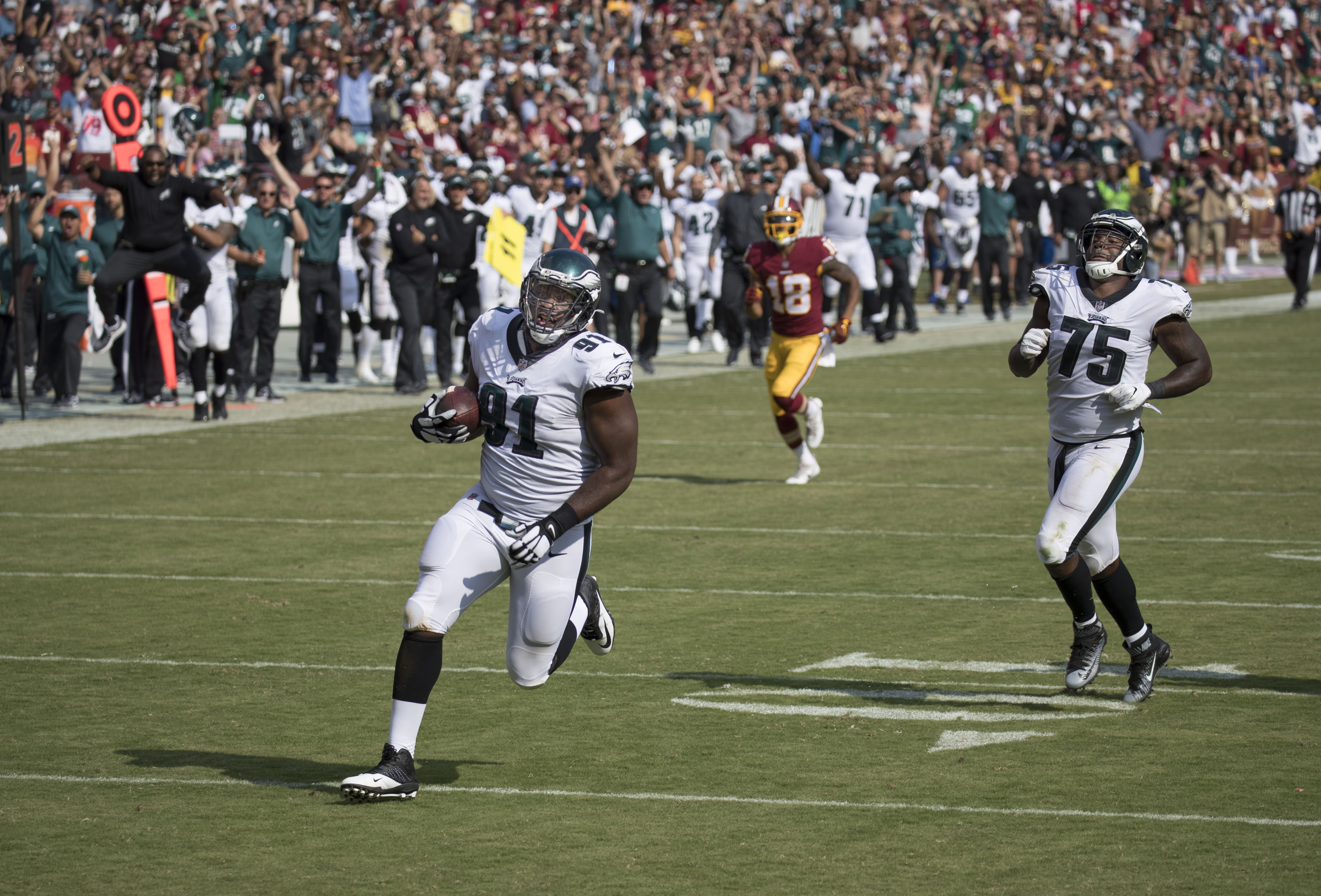
Cox returning a fumble for a touchdown against the Washington Redskins at FedEx Field on September 10, 2017

On September 10, 2017, in the season opening 30–17 victory over the Redskins, Cox recovered a fumble from quarterback Kirk Cousins and returned it for a touchdown late in the fourth quarter helping put the game away. On December 19, 2017, Cox was named to his third straight Pro Bowl. He could not play in the Pro Bowl because of his team advancing to the Super Bowl. The Eagles defeated the New England Patriots in Super Bowl LII 41–33 to give Cox his first Super Bowl ring. He recorded a tackle and two quarterback hits in the game. He was ranked 69th by his peers on the NFL Top 100 Players of 2018.

=== 2018 season ===
In Week 17, Cox recorded three sacks, four tackles for loss, and a forced fumble in a 24–0 win over the Redskins, earning him NFC Defensive Player of the Week. In the 2018 season, he recorded 10.5 sacks, 46 total tackles, and one forced fumble. In addition to being named to his fourth Pro Bowl, he was selected as a first team All-Pro for the first time in his career. He was ranked 28th by his peers on the NFL Top 100 Players of 2019.

=== 2019 season ===
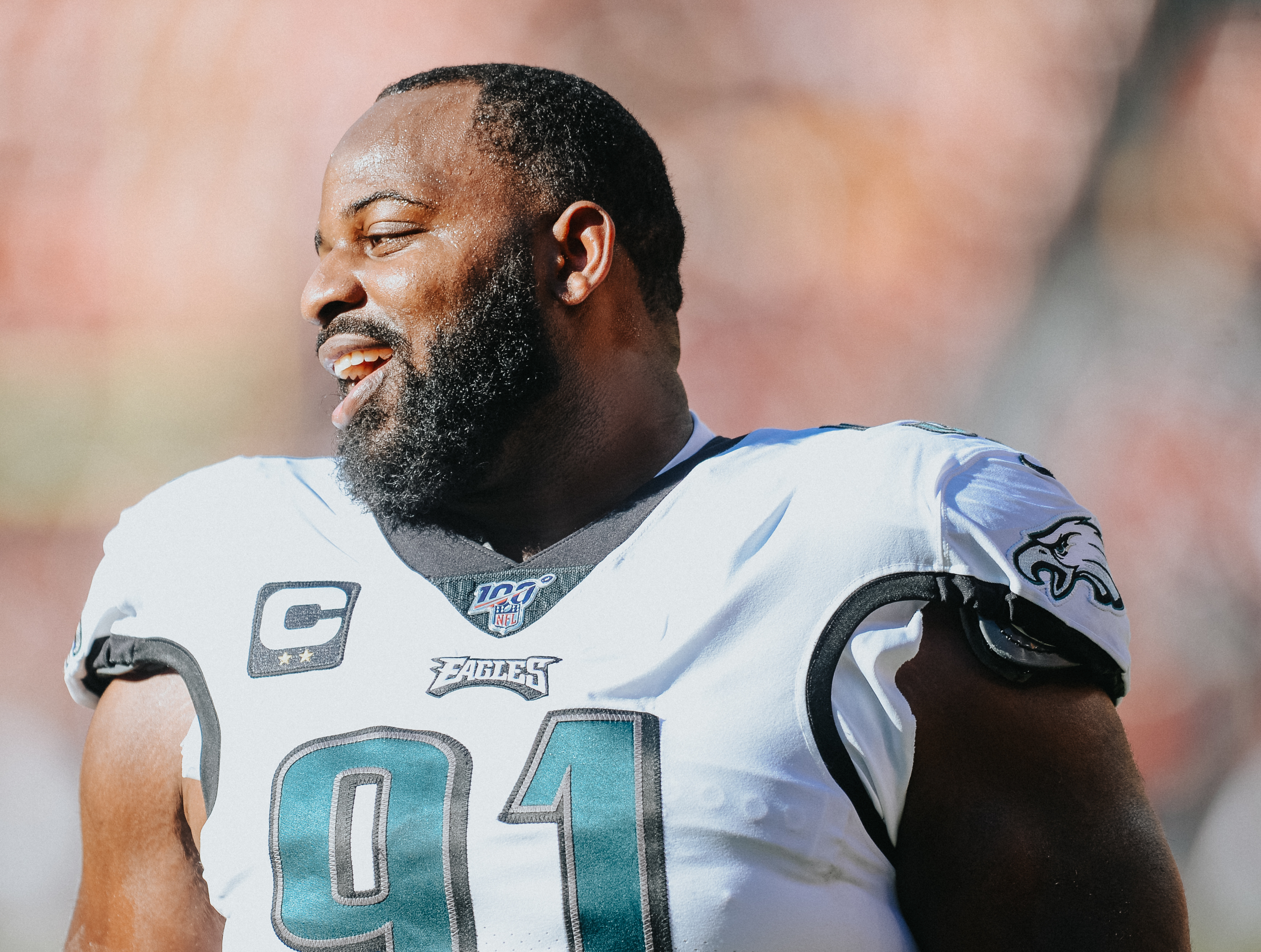
Cox at FedEx Field in Landover, Maryland, December 2019

In Week 7 against the Dallas Cowboys, Cox recorded his first sack and forced fumble of the season on Dak Prescott in the 37–10 loss. In Week 8 against the Buffalo Bills, Cox recorded 1.5 sacks on Josh Allen in the 31–13 win. He finished the 2019 season with 3.5 sacks, 40 total tackles, two passes defended, and three forced fumbles. He was named to his fifth Pro Bowl and was ranked 73rd by his peers on the NFL Top 100 Players of 2020. After the season, Cox was selected as one of the four defensive tackles on the National Football League 2010s All-Decade Team.

=== 2020 season ===
During the 2020 season, Cox registered 6.5 sacks and 41 tackles to go along with a forced fumble in 15 games and starts. With the Eagles already eliminated from the playoffs, he was inactive in Week 17 against the Washington Football Team. He was named to the Pro Bowl for the sixth time in his career and was ranked 63rd by fellow players in the NFL Top 100 Players of 2021.

=== 2021 season ===
In Week 3, against the Cowboys, Cox had a fumble recovery for a touchdown. In Week 15, he recorded two sacks and four quarterback hits against the NFC East rival Washington Football Team. On January 3, 2022, Cox was placed on the COVID list. He was activated one week later on January 10, missing just one game where the Eagles did not play their starters. In the 2021 season, he recorded 3.5 sacks, 35 total tackles, and two forced fumbles.

=== 2022 season ===
On March 17, 2022, Cox was released by the Eagles at the start of the new league year, but was re-signed two days later on a one-year contract. In the 2022 season, he had seven sacks, 43 total tackles, and one forced fumble in 17 games and starts. Cox and the Eagles reached Super Bowl LVII, Cox's second Super Bowl. He had a tackle in the game, which the Eagles lost 38–35 to the Kansas City Chiefs.

=== 2023 season ===
On March 16, 2023, Cox re-signed with the Eagles on a one-year, $10 million contract. He finished the season with 33 total tackles, five sacks, and one fumble recovery.

=== Retirement ===
On March 10, 2024, Cox announced his retirement via Instagram after 12 seasons in the NFL.

== NFL career statistics ==
=== Regular season ===
Legend
	Won the Super Bowl
	Led the league
**Bold**	Career high

Year	Team	Games		Tackles				Interceptions						Fumbles			
Year	Team	GP	GS	Cmb	Solo	Ast	Sck	Int	Yds	Avg	Lng	TD	PD	FF	FR	Yds	TD
2012	PHI	15	9	39	32	7	5.5	0	0	0.0	0	0	**4**	1	0	0	0
2013	PHI	16	16	44	32	12	3.0	0	0	0.0	0	0	3	0	1	3	0
2014	PHI	16	16	61	48	13	4.0	0	0	0.0	0	0	0	1	**3**	**21**	**1**
2015	PHI	16	16	**71**	**50**	**21**	9.5	0	0	0.0	0	0	2	**3**	2	0	0
2016	PHI	16	16	43	27	16	6.5	0	0	0.0	0	0	2	1	1	0	0
2017	PHI	14	14	26	15	11	5.5	0	0	0.0	0	0	1	1	2	20	**1**
2018	PHI	16	16	46	33	13	**10.5**	0	0	0.0	0	0	1	1	1	3	0
2019	PHI	16	16	40	26	14	3.5	0	0	0.0	0	0	2	**3**	1	1	0
2020	PHI	15	15	41	28	13	6.5	0	0	0.0	0	0	1	1	0	0	0
2021	PHI	16	16	35	25	10	3.5	0	0	0.0	0	0	0	2	1	0	**1**
2022	PHI	**17**	**17**	43	23	20	7.0	0	0	0.0	0	0	0	1	1	0	0
2023	PHI	15	15	33	15	18	5.0	0	0	0.0	0	0	0	0	1	8	0
Career		188	182	519	351	168	70.0	0	0	0.0	0	0	16	16	14	56	3

=== Postseason ===
Year	Team	Games		Tackles				Interceptions						Fumbles			
Year	Team	GP	GS	Cmb	Solo	Ast	Sck	Int	Yds	Avg	Lng	TD	PD	FF	FR	Yds	TD
2013	PHI	1	1	3	3	0	0.0	0	0	0.0	0	0	0	0	0	0	0
2017	PHI	**3**	**3**	**11**	**9**	2	**1.0**	0	0	0.0	0	0	0	0	0	0	0
2018	PHI	2	2	5	3	2	0.0	0	0	0.0	0	0	0	0	0	0	0
2019	PHI	1	1	6	3	**3**	0.0	0	0	0.0	0	0	0	**1**	0	0	0
2021	PHI	1	1	3	1	2	0.0	0	0	0.0	0	0	0	0	0	0	0
2022	PHI	**3**	**3**	6	3	**3**	**1.0**	0	0	0.0	0	0	0	0	0	0	0
2023	PHI	1	1	2	0	2	0.5	0	0	0.0	0	0	0	0	0	0	0
Career		12	12	36	22	14	2.5	0	0	0.0	0	0	0	1	0	0	0

== Personal life ==
Cox is the cousin of former Eagles teammate Kenneth Gainwell, who was his teammate for his final three seasons.

Cox is an avid drag racing fan and driver. He grew up working for his older brother Shaddrick's Cox Racing shop in Yazoo, where they worked on vehicle restorations. While unable to race during his playing career, he fielded cars in grudge racing events for friends and established drivers; Cox Racing won the NMCA Street Outlaw championship in 2017. After retiring from football, Cox began competing himself in series like the Professional Drag Racers Association. He won the 2026 Drag Illustrated World Series of Pro Mod's Pro 10.5 title.
