= Alburgh (town), Vermont =

Alburgh, Vermont
- Town
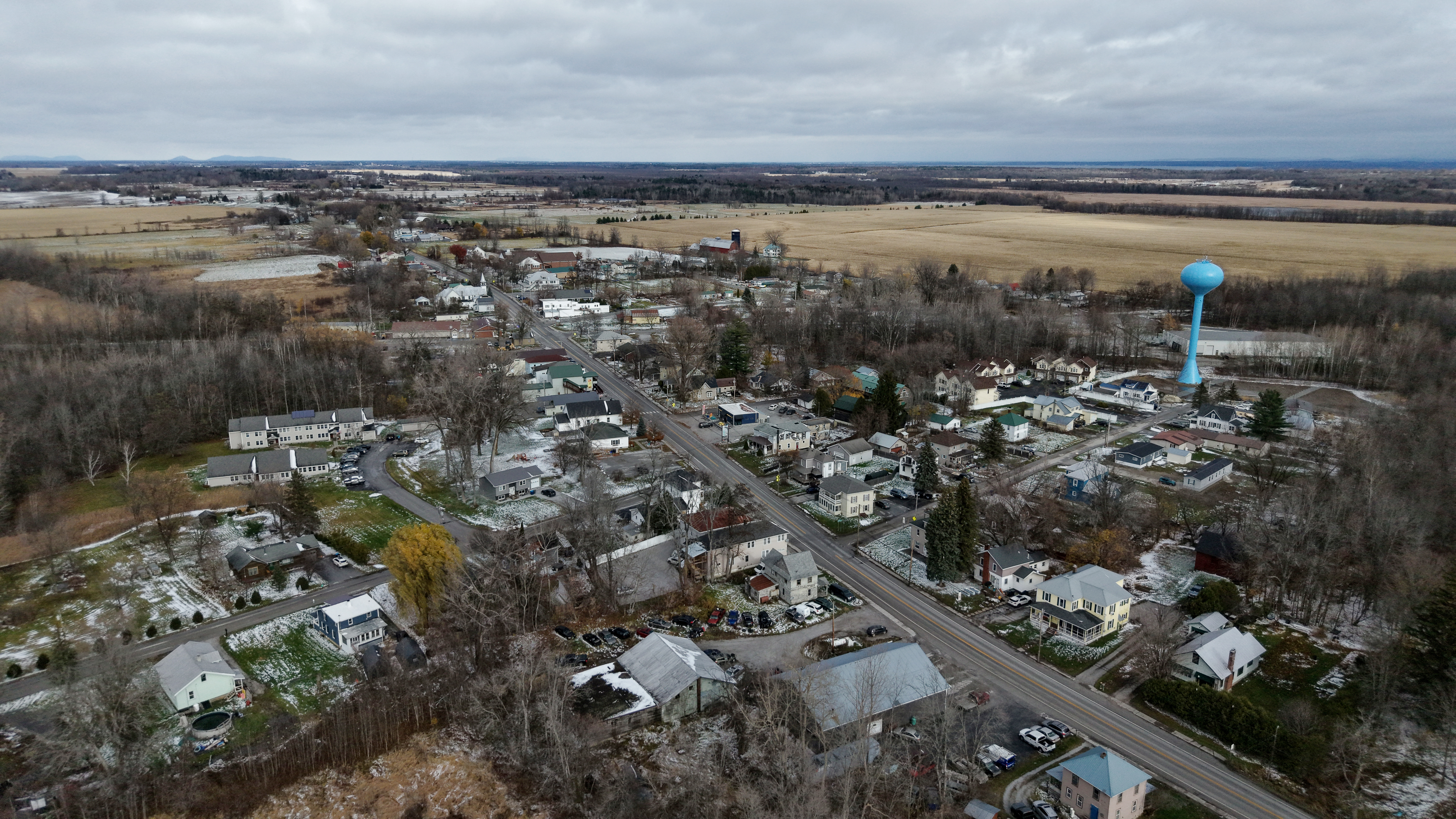
- Alburgh, VT, from the southwest

- Location in Grand Isle County and the state of Vermont
- Coordinates: 44°58′23″N 73°16′58″W
- Country: United States
- State: Vermont
- County: Grand Isle
- Communities: Alburgh; Alburgh Springs; Alburgh Center; East Alburgh; South Alburgh

Area
  - Total: 47.5 sq mi (122.9 km^{2})
  - Land: 29.1 sq mi (75.4 km^{2})
  - Water: 18.3 sq mi (47.5 km^{2})
- Elevation: 164 ft (50 m)

Population (2020)
  - Total: 2,106
  - Density: 67/sq mi (25.7/km^{2})
- Time zone: UTC-5 (Eastern (EST))
  - Summer (DST): UTC-4 (EDT)
- ZIP code: 05440
- Area code: 802
- FIPS code: 50-00625
- GNIS feature ID: 1462025
- Website: alburghvt.org

Alburgh (formerly Alburg) is a town in Grand Isle County, Vermont, United States, founded in 1781 by Ira Allen. The population was 2,106 at the 2020 United States census. Alburgh is on the Alburgh Tongue, a peninsula extending from Canada into Lake Champlain, and lies on the only road-based route across Lake Champlain to New York state north of Addison, Vermont.

== Name spelling change ==
The original name of the town, "Alburgh", was changed to "Alburg" in 1891 by recommendation of the United States Board on Geographic Names. The board recommended that all municipality names ending in "-burgh" be revised to end in "-burg" for the sake of standardization. In April 2006, the Vermont Department of Libraries (in its capacity as the authority on Vermont place names) approved the town's request to change its name from Alburg back to Alburgh after a majority vote on town meeting day.

== European settlement of Alburgh Tongue and founding of Alburgh ==
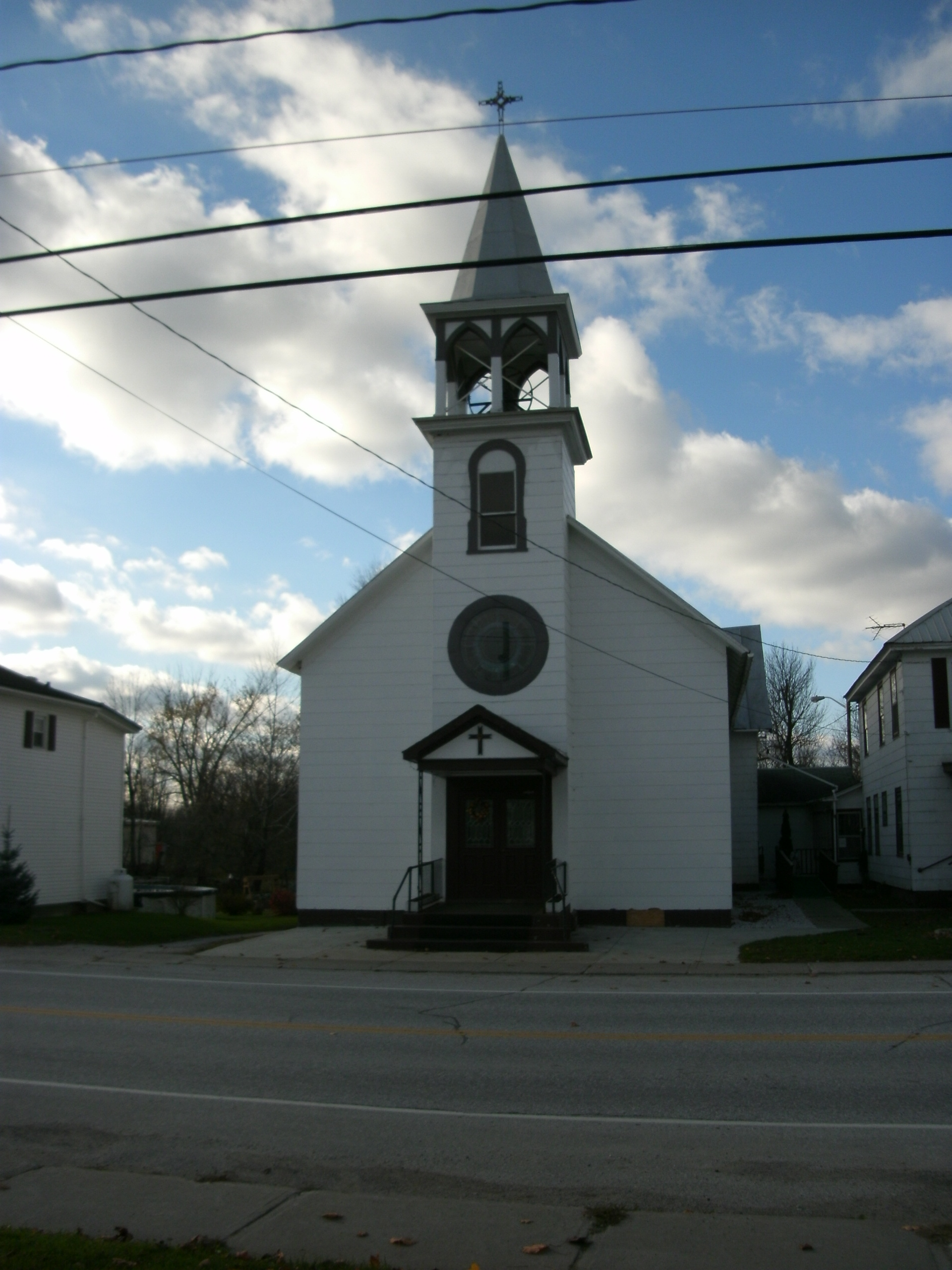
Church in Alburgh

A two-league strip between Missisquoi Bay and the Chambly River (now the Richelieu River) north of the Alburgh tongue was granted by Lieutenant Governor of Quebec Charles de la Boische, Marquis de Beauharnois, and Intendant of New France Gilles Hocquart to Seigneur François Foucault on April 3, 1733 (ratified by the King of France April 6, 1734). Other seigneuries (in particular the seigneurie de la Fontaine to the south) were granted but were not settled. Janvrin Dufresne surveyed the land for the government and submitted his report on June 14, 1737, that the seigneuries were not settled. Foucault thence resubmitted his application to the land in March 1739 (requesting an extension of one league to the south), having established Missiskouy (Missiquoi) Village with six inhabitants. On May 10, 1741, the seigneuries were deemed forfeited for lack of settlement; on May 1, 1743, Foucault's application was accepted (ratified by the King on March 25, 1745). In 1744, Foucault petitioned to extend his seigneurie over the entire peninsula to a total length of five leagues and including the former seigneurie de la Fontaine; the petition was granted November 1, 1744. By 1747, however, the peninsula had been abandoned by any European settlers.

In 1763 at the end of the French and Indian War, New France was ceded to Great Britain. General James Murray purchased the lands including Foucault's seigneurie, and his nephew Richard Murray granted a 99-year lease of the seigneurie to Colonel Henry Caldwell in 1774.

Alburgh was charted February 23, 1781, by Ira Allen and 64 others. Allen paid for the charting, and the name of the town is probably derived from "Allensburgh".

In 1781 Allen was part of the commission that negotiated the Vermont–New York boundary, placing the Alburgh Tongue in Vermont. In 1783 the Canada–United States border was established at the 45th parallel north, making the Vermonter claims to the land undisputed.

== Geography ==
According to the United States Census Bureau, the town has a total area of 47.5 square miles (123 km^{2}), of which 29.1 square miles (75.3 km^{2}) are land and 18.4 square miles (47.6 km^{2}), or 38.69%, are water.

Alburgh is one of only six non-island locations in the 48 contiguous states not directly connected to them by land, the others being nearby Province Point, Vermont; Point Roberts, Washington; Elm Point, Minnesota; the Northwest Angle in Minnesota; and an unnamed point in North Dakota. However, there are bridges to Rouses Point, New York, (U.S. Route 2) and Swanton, Vermont, as well as to North Hero island to the southeast. This makes Alburgh not practically an exclave, unlike the other locations not connected to the United States by land. Isle La Motte lies to the southwest. Alburgh Dunes State Park has one of the most natural and longest beaches on Lake Champlain.

== Demographics ==
Historical population
Census	Pop.	Note	%±
1790	446		—
1800	750		68.2%
1810	1,106		47.5%
1820	1,172		6.0%
1830	1,239		5.7%
1840	1,344		8.5%
1850	1,568		16.7%
1860	1,793		14.3%
1870	1,716		−4.3%
1880	1,614		−5.9%
1890	1,390		−13.9%
1900	1,474		6.0%
1910	1,211		−17.8%
1920	1,491		23.1%
1930	1,609		7.9%
1940	1,623		0.9%
1950	1,402		−13.6%
1960	1,123		−19.9%
1970	1,271		13.2%
1980	1,352		6.4%
1990	1,362		0.7%
2000	1,952		43.3%
2010	1,998		2.4%
2020	2,106		5.4%
U.S. Decennial Census

As of the census of 2000, there were 1,952 people, 791 households, and 529 families residing in the town. The population density was 66.6 people per square mile (25.7/km^{2}). There were 1,259 housing units at an average density of 43.0 per square mile (16.6/km^{2}). The racial makeup of the town was 96.67% White, 1.95% Native American, 0.15% Asian, and 1.23% from two or more races. Hispanic or Latino of any race were 0.20% of the population.

There were 791 households, out of which 31.2% had children under the age of 18 living with them, 55.4% were married couples living together, 7.8% had a female householder with no husband present, and 33.1% were non-families. 26.2% of all households were made up of individuals, and 11.8% had someone living alone who was 65 years of age or older. The average household size was 2.47 and the average family size was 2.97.

In the town, the population was spread out, with 25.4% under the age of 18, 7.2% from 18 to 24, 28.8% from 25 to 44, 24.6% from 45 to 64, and 14.0% who were 65 years of age or older. The median age was 38 years. For every 100 females, there were 100.8 males. For every 100 females age 18 and over, there were 99.0 males.

The median income for a household in the town was $33,148, and the median income for a family was $39,783. Males had a median income of $30,655 versus $23,750 for females. The per capita income for the town was $16,285. About 10.8% of families and 12.8% of the population were below the poverty line, including 18.4% of those under age 18 and 13.9% of those age 65 or over.

== Education ==
There is one supervisory union in the county, the Grand Isle Supervisory Union, which has elementary school services. The Grand Isle school is operated by the Champlain Islands Unified Union School District.

== Notable people ==
- Jeptha Bradley (1802–1862), Vermont Auditor of Accounts, served as U.S. Customs Inspector in Alburgh
- Barbour Lewis (1818–1893), US congressman from Tennessee, born in Alburgh
- Norman Albert Mott (1855–1920), member of the Mississippi Legislature; born in Alburgh

== Gallery ==
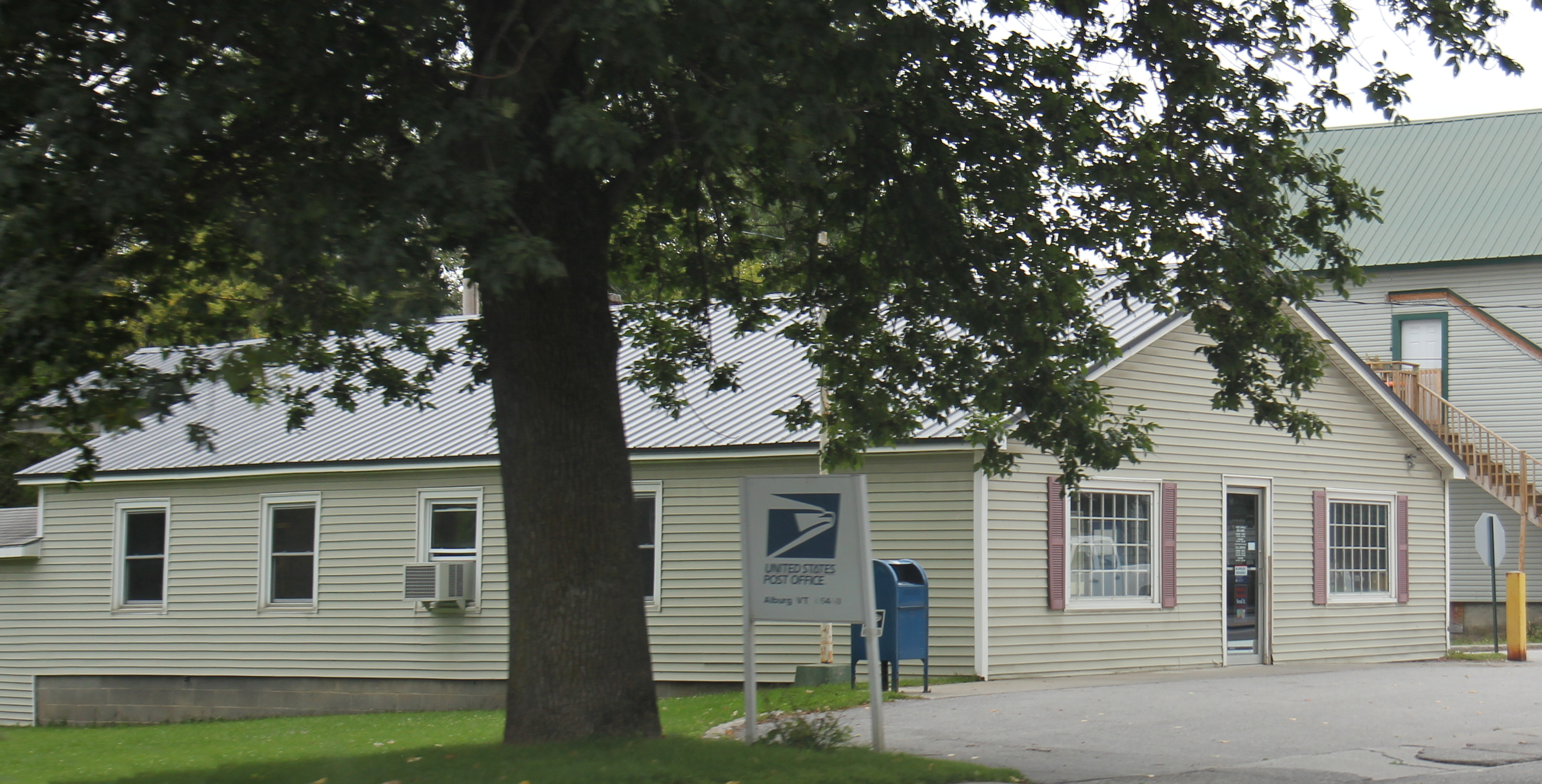
Post office

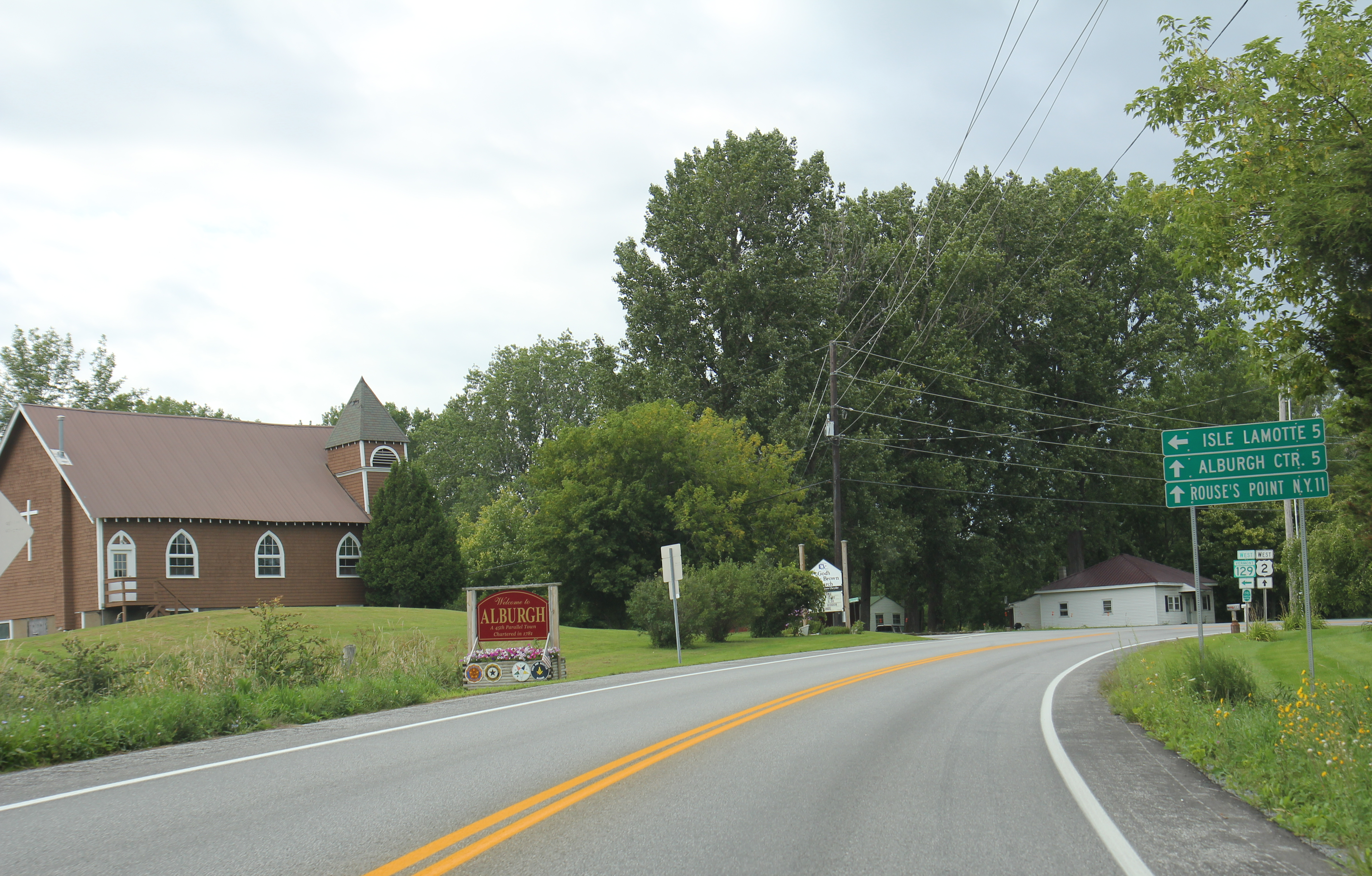
Sign on US2
