= List of mayors of Yazoo City, Mississippi =

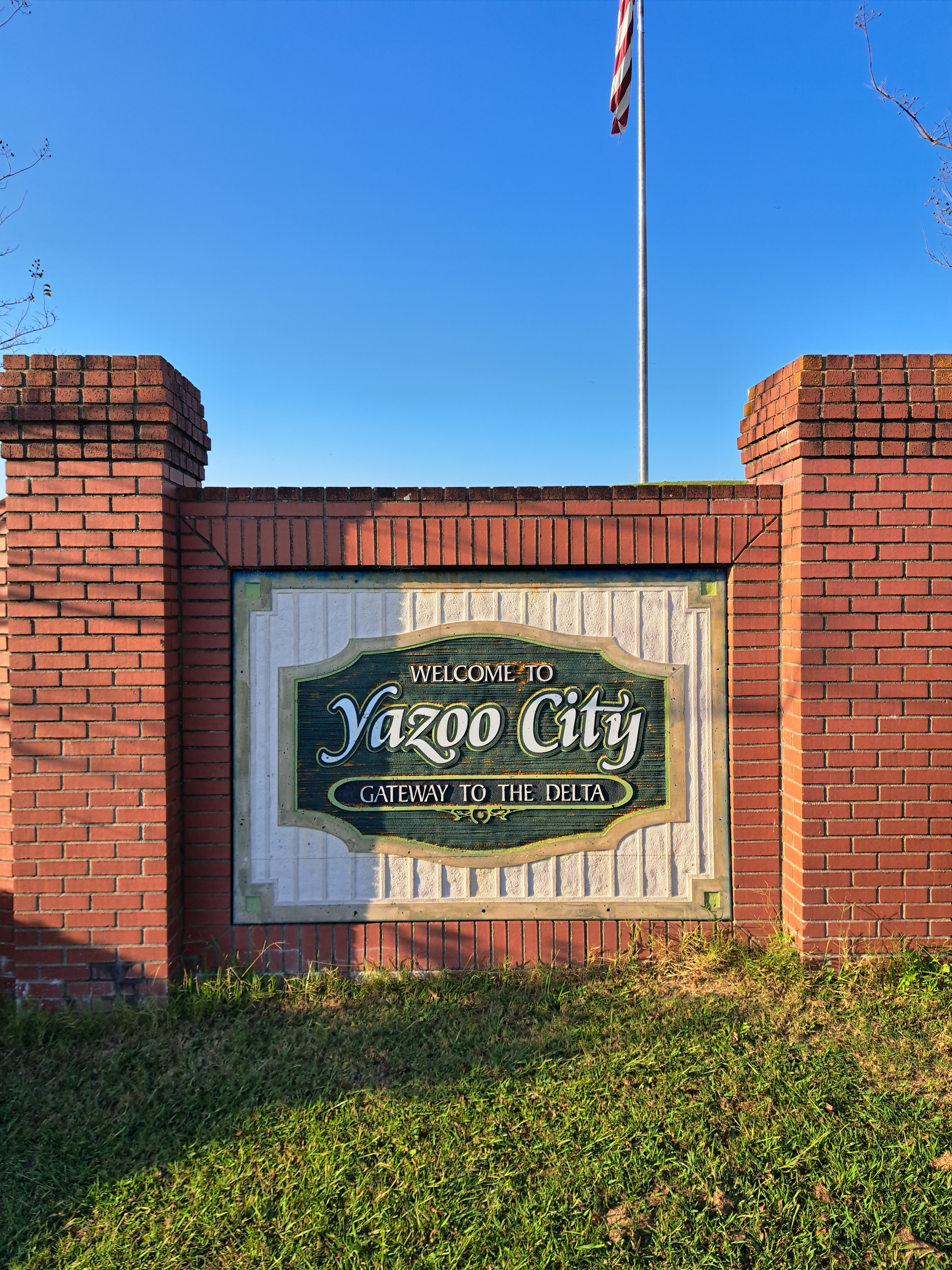
Welcome sign

The mayor of Yazoo City, Mississippi is elected every four years by the population at large. Being the chief executive officer of the city, the mayor is responsible for administering and leading the day-to-day operations of city government. The current mayor of the city is David "Mel" Starling, who was elected in 2022.

City Hall is located at 128 East Jefferson Street.

== List of mayors ==
=== Nineteenth century ===
Mayor name	Term	Notes
Hodge		
M. B. Hamer	1834	Referred to as President Pro-Tem
Gustavus Cheyney Doane	1867–1868	Reconstruction
Joseph A. Holt	1877–1880	
D. R. Barnett	1882–1884	
C. H. Williams	1884–1886	
A. M. Roach	1886–1888	
W. G. Deles	1888–1892	
Theodore Schmitt	1892–1894	
John C. Henderson	1894–1897	
John H. Murphy	1897	Interim mayor upon the resignation of Henderson. Died in office.
George M. Powell	1897–1900	

=== Twentieth Century ===
Mayor name	Term	Notes
Edward Luke	1900–1904	
Edwin R. Holmes	1904–1908	
Edward Luke	1908–1911	Returned to office.
Thomas H. Campbell, Jr.	1911–1920	
E. P. Swain	1920–1928	
J. O. Stricklin, Sr.	1928–1930	Died in office shortly after winning decisively for a second term. Committed suicide on Tuesday, April 1, 1930, after shooting and seriously wounding F. R. Birdsall, editor of the Yazoo Sentinel newspaper. The shooting occurred after Birdsall published a story of a grand jury indictment against Stricklin. Birdsall died from his injuries the following day.
R. M. Middleton	1930	Interim mayor after the death of Stricklin. Finished a distant second in special election to complete remainder of Stricklin's unexpired term.
Dewitt M. Love	1930–1942	
Nathan L. Swayze	1942–1945	Died in office
R. M. Middleton	1945	Interim mayor after the death of Swayze.
Charles L. Graeber	1945–1947	
J. B. Smith	1947–1948	
William Sidney Perry	1948–1954	
Harry Applebaum	1954–1968	
J. F. Barbour III	1968–1972	Elected as an Independent, Barbour was one of the first Mississippi politicians to successfully challenge the Democratic Party in the state in the modern era.
Floyd E. Johnson	1972-1978	
Charles E. Fulgham	1978–1990	
Hugh J. McGraw	1990–1998	

=== Twenty-first century ===
Mayor name	Term	Notes
Wardell Leach	1998–2006	First African American mayor. Brother of Herman Leach (1937-2023), who in 1979 became the first African American county supervisor in Yazoo County.
McArthur Slaughter	2006–2014	
Diana Delaware	2014–2022	First female mayor
David "Mel" Starling	2022–2026	Did not seek re-election
Macklyn Austin	2026-	
