= J. F. Barbour III =

American politician

Mayor of Yazoo City, Mississippi
- In office 1968–1972
- Preceded by: Harry Applebaum
- Succeeded by: Floyd E. Johnson

Personal details
- Born: Jeptha Fowlkes Barbour III; September 7, 1940 (age 85) Yazoo City, Mississippi
- Party: Republican (prior to 1968; 1972-present); Independent (1968-1972)
- Spouse: Frances Allen
- Children: 5
- Education: University of Mississippi
- Occupation: Banker

J. F. Barbour III (born September 7, 1940) is an American politician from the U.S. state of Mississippi. In 1968, he was elected as an independent (although closely affiliated with the Republican party) as mayor of Yazoo City, Mississippi. It was the first time that a non-Democrat held the post since Reconstruction.

== Background ==
Jeptha Fowlkes "Jeppie" Barbour III was born on September 7, 1940, in Yazoo City, Mississippi, the eldest child of Jeptha Fowlkes Jr. and Grace LeFlore (Johnson) Barbour. His father was a lawyer who died when he was a child. His mother served as a notary public and gave him the oath of office when her son was elected mayor. Jeppie is the older brother of former Mississippi governor Haley Barbour.

== Career ==
In 1968, Barbour became one of the youngest mayors in the history of Yazoo City, when he was elected at age 27. Although he was elected as an independent, Barbour was closely aligned with the Republican Party, having previously served as finance chairman for the Yazoo County GOP. At this time, there was no Republican Municipal Committee to hold a GOP primary.

In 1972, Barbour ran for re-election as a Republican. Despite a record turn-out, Barbour lost to Floyd E. Johnson, a Democrat. Eugene Ward, an African-American, running as Independent, finished a close third behind Barbour.

After he left office, Barbour became the Mississippi state director of FHA.

Preceded by Harry Applebaum	Mayor of Yazoo City, Mississippi; 1968–1972	Succeeded by Floyd E. Johnson
