= James Wheaton =

American actor

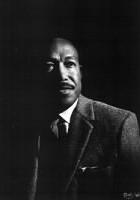
- Wheaton c. 1968
- Born: James Lorenzo Wheaton; January 11, 1924; Meridian, Mississippi, U.S.
- Died: June 9, 2002 (aged 78); Los Angeles, California, U.S.
- Occupations: Actor; director; writer
- Years active: 1950–2001
- Spouse: Helen Alford (divorced)
- Family: Frank Wheaton (son); Jesse E. Holmes (grandfather); T. D. Jakes (first cousin twice removed); H. H. Brookins (second cousin)

James Lorenzo Wheaton (January 11, 1924 – June 9, 2002) was an American motion picture, stage, and television actor. Wheaton's credits include THX 1138, Trouble Comes to Town and Sanford and Son.

In the early 1950s, he moved from his native Mississippi to Los Angeles, where he found work in local radio productions. His big break came when he was selected to join the Bishop's Company, a repertory theatre company which toured churches in the United States." Wheaton appeared in their first production, Christopher Fry's "The Boy with a Cart," which premiered at the Vermont Square Methodist Church in Los Angeles on January 11, 1953." As the only African-American member of the group, he was given the opportunity to play a wide range of roles, which was rare for black actors at the time. One of his best known roles with the company was as "Scratch" in "The Devil and Daniel Webster." Later, he would become a leading actor with the Ebony Showcase Theatre in Los Angeles. He would also direct several productions for the theatre. Regarding his staging of The Odd Couple, Los Angeles Times theatre critic Margaret Harford wrote "James Wheaton's slick direction makes the overall production all one could ask." His role as "J.B. Mongoose" in the Ebony Showcase production of "Carnival Island" was so popular, that he was soon appearing on television.

However, his biggest success on stage was the West Coast premiere of Norman, Is That You? at the Ebony Showcase Theater in Los Angeles. This production, in which he both directed and starred as the father was enormously popular with audiences and critics alike. At one time, it was the longest running play in the history of the Los Angeles theatre. "With a blend of shock and bruised vanity, Wheaton gives a richly flavored performance" wrote John C. Mahoney in his Los Angeles Times review. "Wheaton's assured direction keeps featherweight ingredients afloat and on target."

During the late 1960s and 1970s, Wheaton appeared on some of the most popular television programs of the day including Room 222, Kojak, Good Times, and the final episode of Ironside. He had a recurring role as Nelson B. Davis, "The Friendly Undertaker", on Sanford and Son. Other feature film credits included Black Belt Jones and lastly, Gun Crazy with Drew Barrymore. He also reteamed with Bill Cosby in A Piece of the Action, which also starred and was directed by Sidney Poitier.

In the early 1970s he taught at Figueroa Street Elementary School and Parmelee Avenue Elementary School in Los Angeles.

== Selected credits ==
=== Theatre ===
==== Directing ====
Year	Production	Theatre(s)	Notes
1968	The Odd Couple	Ebony Showcase Theater	Larry McCormick's acting debut
1971	Norman, Is That You?	Ebony Showcase Theater	Also starred. One of the longest running plays in Los Angeles theatre history.

=== Films ===
Year	Title	Role	Notes
1971	THX 1138	OMM	Voice
1974	Black Belt Jones	Eulogizing Minister	Uncredited
1977	A Piece of the Action	Voisin Waiter	
1992	Guncrazy	Parole Officer #2	
