= List of private schools in Mississippi =

This is a list of private schools in the U.S. state of Mississippi:

- Adams County Christian School
- Amite School Center
- Annunciation Catholic School
- Bass Memorial Academy (closed)
- Bayou Academy
- Benedict Day School
- Benton Academy
- Brookhaven Academy
- Calhoun Academy
- Calvary Christian School
- Canton Academy
- Carroll Academy
- Cathedral High School
- Cedar Lake Christian Academy
- Central Academy (Closed)
- Central Delta Academy (Closed)
- Central Hinds Academy
- Central Holmes Christian School
- Centreville Academy
- Chamberlain-Hunt Academy (Closed)
- Christ Covenant School
- Christ Missionary and Industrial
- Christian Collegiate Academy
- Claiborne Educational Foundation
- Clinton Christian Academy
- Coast Episcopal School
- Columbia Academy
- Copiah Academy
- Cross Creek Christian Academy
- Cruger-Tchula Academy (Closed)
- Deer Creek School
- Delta Academy
- Delta Streets Academy
- Desoto County Academy
- Desoto School
- East Holmes Academy (Closed)
- East Rankin Academy
- Education Center School
- Faith Christian School
- FBC of Taylorsville Christian School
- First Presbyterian Day School
- French Camp Academy (Boarding)
- Friendship Christian Academy
- Gateway Christian Academy (Wiggins)
- Grace Baptist School
- Grace Christian School
- Grace Community School
- Green River Boys Ranch
- Greenville Christian School
- Hartfield Academy
- Hebron Christian School (Soon to Be Closed)
- Heidelberg Academy (Closed)
- Heritage Academy
- Hillcrest Christian School
- Humphreys Academy
- Immanuel Center for Christian Education
- Indianola Academy
- Jackson Academy
- Jackson Preparatory School
- Kirk Academy
- Lamar School
- Laurel Christian School
- Leake Academy
- Lee Academy
- Madison-Ridgeland Academy
- Magnolia Heights School
- Manchester Academy
- Marshall Academy
- Mother Goose Christian Academy
- Mt. Salus Christian School (Clinton)
- Newton County Academy
- North Delta School
- North Sunflower Academy
- Northpoint Christian School
- Oak Hill Academy
- Our Lady Academy (girls only)
- Oxford University School
- Park Place Christian Academy
- Parklane Academy
- Pillow Academy
- Pine Hills Christian Academy
- Pinelake Christian School (Closed)
- Piney Woods Country Life School (Boarding)
- Porters Chapel Academy
- Prentiss Christian School
- Presbyterian Christian School (Hattiesburg, Mississippi)
- Presbyterian Day School-Cleveland
- Providence Christian Academy (Clinton, Mississippi)
- REBUL Academy (Closed)
- Resurrection Catholic School (Pascagoula, Mississippi)
- Russell Christian Academy
- Sacred Heart Catholic School
- School of Excellence (Hattiesburg)
- Sharkey-Issaquena Academy
- Simpson County Academy
- St. Andrew's Episcopal School
- St. George's Episcopal Day School
- St. Joseph Catholic School (Greenville, Mississippi)
- St. Joseph Catholic School (Madison, Mississippi)
- St. Patrick Catholic High School (Biloxi, Mississippi)
- St. Stanislaus College (Day & Boarding - boys only)
- Starkville Academy
- Starkville Christian School
- Strider Academy (Closed)
- Sylva Bay Academy
- Tri-County Academy
- Trinity Episcopal Day School (Closed)
- Trinity Pre-School
- Tunica Academy
- Tupelo Christian Preparatory School
- Union Academy
- Union Church Christian Academy
- University of Mississippi High School
- The Veritas School (Closed)
- Vicksburg Catholic School (St. Francis Xavier/ St. Aloyisus High School)
- Vicksburg Community School
- Victory Christian Academy (Columbus)
- Washington School
- Wayne Academy
- Westminster Academy
- Wilkinson County Christian Academy
- Winona Christian School
- Winston Academy
