= Gibbons High School =

Gibbons High School may refer to:

- Cardinal Gibbons High School (disambiguation), several schools with the same name
- Gibbons High School, in Petersburg, Virginia, merged into St. Vincent de Paul High School (Petersburg, Virginia)
- Notre Dame-Bishop Gibbons High School, Schenectady, New York
