= Marshall Academy =

Segregation academy in Mississippi

Coordinates: 34.760498°N 89.461242°W

Marshall Academy is a 3-K to 12th grade college preparatory school in Holly Springs, Mississippi that opened in 1968. The school's teams compete as the Patriots and Lady Patriots.

== History ==
Marshall Academy opened in 1968 during the era of desegregation when many segregation academy schools opened catering to families that opposed integration and did not want their children to go to school with African Americans. The school began with 150 students in grades 1 through 8 in temporary facilities leased from the First Baptist, First Methodist, and Christ Episcopal Churches. A high School, a pre-school, and kindergarten were added in 1969. In 1985, Marshall Academy chairman A.Q. Greer told the Clarion-Ledger that "The level of education in public schools just dropped at integration, and we were just trying to provide a superior education".

Marshall Academy's website states that it admits students of any race, color, nationality, or ethnic origin and that it does not discriminate on the basis of race, color, or ethnic origin in the administration policies, athletics, or other school-administered programs. Also according to the school's website, the school is 86% white (2024) as compared to Marshall County from which the school draws its students which is approximately 50% white.

== Sports ==
In 1969 it joined The Northern Division of an athletic conference with Fayette Academy of Somerville, Tennessee, Tunica Institute of Learning of Tunica, Mississippi, Kirk Academy of Grenada, Mississippi, Bayou Academy of Skene, and Pillow Academy in Leflore County, Mississippi.

In 2017 the school's softball team coached by Carlton Gibson became Class AA MAIS champions. The team also won MAIS championships in 2007 and 2008. In 2017 the school's football team competed in the Southeastern Commission of Independent Schools Kickoff Classic in Montgomery Alabama. In 2017 alumnus Traci Rodgers became coach of the Lady Patriots basketball team.

== Alumni ==
Fox News reporter Shepard Smith went to Marshall Academy and graduated in the class of 1982. In a 2005 interview he said his class was the largest in the school's history when he graduated with about 60 others. After high school he moved to Florida with his mom before returning to Mississippi to study journalism at the University of Mississippi.
