= Lawrence County Academy =

Segregation academy in Mississippi

Location
- Ferguson Mill Road; Lawrence County, Mississippi; United States; 31°37′17″N 90°04′10″W

Information
- Type: Private
- Established: 1970
- Closed: 1986
- Principal: Autry Donnie Smith (1986)
- Grades: PK–12
- Enrollment: 158 (1985)
- Campus type: Rural
- Mascot: Colonel Reb
- Nickname: Rebels
- Accreditation: Southern Association of Colleges and Schools
- Affiliation: Mississippi Association of Independent Schools

Lawrence County Academy was a private PK–12 school in Lawrence County, Mississippi, near Monticello. The school has been described as a segregation academy.

== History ==
In January 1970, the United States Court of Appeals for the Fifth Circuit ordered Mississippi to desegregate its public schools. Lawrence County Academy was founded in 1970 as a segregation academy. The school's team nickname was the Rebels; the mascot was a "Col. Reb" who carried a Confederate flag.

The school closed in September 1986 due to declining enrollment.

In 2018 Mississippi Senate special election, Cindy Hyde-Smith was criticized for attendance at the school.

== Notable people ==
- Cindy Hyde-Smith, U.S. Senator from Mississippi, is an alumna
- Ronnie Shows, U.S. Representative from Mississippi, coached basketball at the school

== See also ==
- List of private schools in Mississippi
