= Jamestown Academy =

Jamestown Academy may refer to

- Jamestown Academy (New York), school in the United States
- Jamestown Academy (Virginia), school in the United States
