= John Hancock Academy =

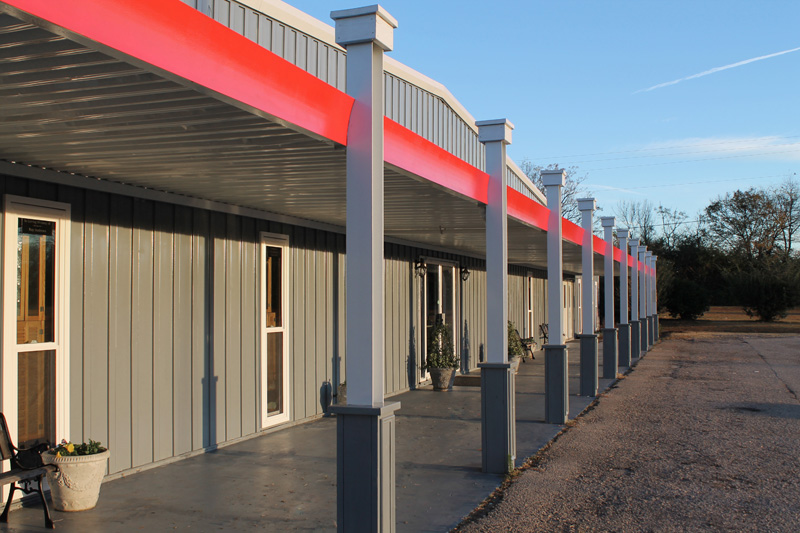
- John Hancock Academy Front

Location
- Sparta, Georgia
- 33.2624126°N 82.9746063°W

Information
- Type: Segregation academy
- Founded: 1966
- NCES School ID: 00297758
- Faculty: 18
- Enrollment: 105 (2023–24)
- Mascot: Confederate General
- Nickname: Rebels
- Accreditation: Georgia Independent School Association
- Affiliation: Georgia Independent Christian Athletic Association
- Website: johnhancockacademy.com
- Last updated: 9 January 2018

John Hancock Academy is a segregation academy in Sparta, Georgia, seat of Hancock County, Georgia. It serves 143 students. It is named after John Hancock.

It serves grades PreK-12.

== History ==
Hancock was chartered in 1966 as a segregation academy, by George Darden and two other men. The school opened on August 28, 1967 in a facility that had formerly been the all-white Sparta High School, the school moved into its present facilities on Linton Road in 1971. The first principal was Reverend James L. Brantley who died during the first school year, and was replaced by Reverend Harold Thomas. At the time of the school's founding, the population of the county was approximately 80% White and 20% Black. The White segment, 180 students in grades K-12, migrated "nearly en-masse" to John Hancock Academy.

Two black children attended Hancock during the 2015–2016 school year.

The sports teams nickname is the Rebels, and the mascot is a confederate general.
