= Tomahawk Academy =

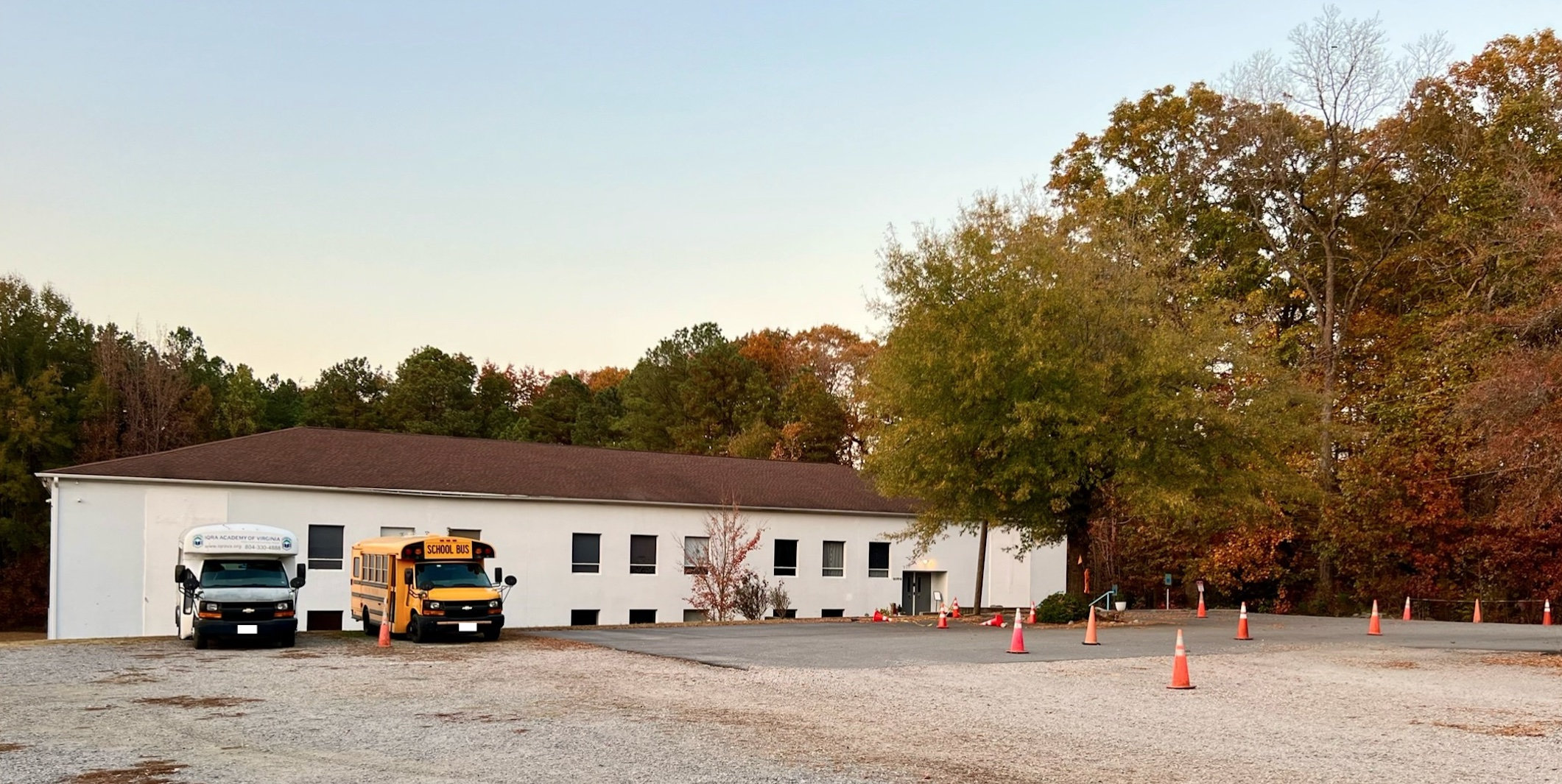
- The former location of Tomahawk Academy, now the Al Madina School of Richmond

Location
- Midlothian, Virginia
- Coordinates: 37.46293°N 77.59554°W

Information
- Type: Private
- Opened: 1964
- Campus size: 20 acres (8.1 ha)

Tomahawk Academy was a private school in Chesterfield County, Virginia, established in 1964 when black students became eligible to attend the county schools after the landmark Brown v. Board of Education Supreme Court ruling.

Tuition at Tomahawk was covered in part by state tuition grants. Grants to a "nonprofit, nonsectarian private school", even segregation academies, were upheld by the Third Circuit Court of Appeals.

The campus was taken over by Al Madina School of Richmond in 1998.
