= Fuqua School =

Segregation academy in Virginia

Location
- 605 Fuqua Drive; Farmville, Virginia 23901; United States; 37°17′37.9″N 78°23′9.3″W

Information
- Type: Private
- Motto: Scientiā volamus ("Through knowledge, we fly")
- Established: 1959
- Head of school: Paul Chance Reynolds
- Grades: Pre-K to 12th
- Enrollment: 383 (2013–2014 school year)
- Colors: Red and Gold/Black and Yellow
- Mascot: Falcons
- Yearbook: The Peregrine
- Endowment: $6.0 million+
- Information: 434-392-4131
- Website: https://www.fuquaschool.org/

Fuqua School is a private primary and secondary school located in Farmville, Virginia. Founded in 1959 as Prince Edward Academy, a whites-only segregation academy, the school was renamed after businessman J. B. Fuqua made a large contribution to the school in 1993.

== History ==
After the United States Supreme Court ruled in Brown v. Board of Education that public education must be racially integrated, the Prince Edward County school board closed all of its schools, appropriating no funds whatsoever for public schooling in Prince Edward County for the fall of 1959. Fuqua School was initially founded in 1959 as Prince Edward Academy in response to pending integration, part of a strategy known as massive resistance. Classes began at Prince Edward Academy on September 14, 1959. Over the next few years essentially all of the white children in the district were attending the academy.

According to Lino Graglia, the rural nature of Prince Edward County meant that, unlike in Washington, D.C., white parents seeking segregated education were forced to build a private school instead of moving to the suburbs.

The public school system in Prince Edward County remained closed between 1959 and 1964. The United States Supreme Court decision Griffin v. County School Board of Prince Edward County with a vote of 7–2 outlawed the allocation of public funds through tuition grants to fund race-discriminating institutions. When public schools were reopened in 1964 and integrated, Prince Edward Academy stood as an option for families who did not want to participate in integration, thus continuing racial tension among citizens. Because Prince Edward Academy did not accept non-white students, it lost its tax-exempt status in 1978 and began to suffer financially.

In a 1982 interview with the Los Angeles Times, headmaster Robert Woods said that the school had an open admissions policy, but that no blacks had been admitted since they were less intelligent than whites. Woods added that the school did not "teach segregation or integration" because that was "for the parents to do".

It was not until the late 1980s that it ended its policy of discrimination and admitted students of other races. Its association with "old money" and discrimination in the past still causes some tension in the Farmville community, especially among non-whites and students of the local public schools.

By the early 1990s, with aging technology, a very small alumni contribution base, and an increasing debt, Prince Edward Academy was nearing financial collapse. In 1992, former local resident and businessman J. B. Fuqua donated about $10 million to pay off debts and install necessary improvements to the school, such as air conditioning and computers. The school was transformed at that point with a new administration, a new mascot and school colors, in addition to the school's changed name. Fuqua said that his donation was intended to "close the door" on Prince Edward County's history of racial division and earmarked a portion of his gift to minority scholarships.

J. B. Fuqua's support for and interest in the private school did not end with his initial contribution; until his death in 2006, Fuqua donated thousands of dollars to the school each year and regularly visited the school and its students.

In 2008, in order to improve its reputation in Farmville, Fuqua School offered African-American high school football player Charles Williams a full scholarship to the school if he would agree to promote it in the town's black community.

As of the 2015–16 school year, 15 of Fuqua's 344 students were black. Fuqua's administration and students have also been actively involved with recent community efforts to commemorate the 1951 Robert Russa Moton High School student walkout, a major event in the struggle to end public and private segregation in the U.S.

== Academics ==
The Fuqua campus is organized into two smaller schools, each with their own faculty, staff and daily schedules:

- Upper School: 7th to 12th grade
- Lower School: Pre-K to 6th grade

== Accreditation ==
The school is fully accredited by the Virginia Association of Independent Schools, and the Southern Association of Colleges and Schools.

== Extracurricular Activities ==
The Upper School at Fuqua currently features the following student clubs and activities:

- Battle of the Brains, Ecology Club, Debate Team, Model United Nations (sponsored by Hampden-Sydney College), Readers Club, Student Organization for Developing Attitudes (S.O.D.A.), Youth For Christ, Youth and Government

== Athletics ==
The Falcons organize their student athletes mostly into Junior Varsity (6th-8th grade) and Varsity (9th-12th grade) teams. Most teams have a boys and a girls team, but a few are organized only as co-ed teams. Fuqua School typically competes with other Virginia private schools like the Fishburne Military School and Isle of Wight Academy.

Fuqua School athletes (as of the 2022–2023 school year) compete on the following schedule:

- Fall Sports: Varsity and Junior Varsity Boys Football, Varsity and Junior Varsity Girls Volleyball, Middle School Girls Volleyball, Varsity Co-ed Cross Country, Varsity and Junior Varsity Cheerleading
- Winter Sports: Varsity and Junior Varsity Boys Basketball, Middle School Boys Basketball, Varsity and Junior Varsity Girls Basketball, Middle School Girls Basketball, Varsity and Middle School Co-ed Swimming, Varsity and Junior Varsity Cheerleading
- Spring Sports: Varsity and Junior Varsity Boys Baseball, Varsity and Junior Varsity Girls Softball, Boys Lacrosse, Girls Lacrosse, Varsity Co-ed Soccer, Varsity Co-ed Golf

== See also ==
- Davis v. County School Board of Prince Edward County (1952)
