= Lady Raiders =

Lady Raiders may refer to American college sports teams:

- Lady Raiders, female athletic teams at Southland Academy in Americus, Georgia
- Texas Tech Red Raiders and Lady Raiders, athletic teams at Texas Tech University in Lubbock, Texas; the women's basketball team uses the name Lady Raiders; however, the school's other women's teams use the "Red Raiders" name
