= Springwood High School =

Springwood High School may refer to:

- Springwood High School, King's Lynn, in Norfolk, England
- Springwood High School (Alabama), in Lanett, Alabama
- Springwood High School (New South Wales), in City of Blue Mountains, New South Wales
- Springwood State High School, in Springwood, Queensland
