= West Memphis Christian School =

Location
- 1101 N. Missouri St. West Memphis, Arkansas 72301; United States; 35°09′30″N 90°10′59″W

Information
- Type: Private co-educational elementary & secondary
- Established: 1970
- CEEB code: 042616
- Headmaster: Darrow Anderson
- Grades: Pre-K–12
- Enrollment: 175
- Average class size: 10-20
- Student to teacher ratio: 20 to 1
- Colors: Black, gold, and white
- Mascot: Black Knights
- Team name: West Memphis Black Knights
- Tuition: $7,500 (9–12) / $6,500 (4-8) / $5,700 (K-3)
- Website: www.wmcs.com

West Memphis Christian School is a private, college preparatory Christian school located in West Memphis, Arkansas.

== History ==
The school opened in 1970 as a segregation academy in response to the court ordered racial integration of public schools.

== Accreditation ==
WMCS was founded in 1970. Programs for kindergarten through Grade 8 began in 1971, and a program for grades 9–12 was added in 1974. The school is fully accredited by the ANSAA (Arkansas Non-public School Accrediting Association) and NCA CASI (North Central Association Commission on Accreditation and School Improvement). WMCS is also a member of the Association of Christian Schools International, Southern Association of Independent Schools and Arkansas Association of Independent Schools.

== Campuses ==
=== Original ===
The first classes were held at Missouri Street Church of Christ.

A junior and senior high facility at Avondale Circle was completed in 1975 and sold in 2006.

The elementary facility was completed in 1987.

=== Current ===
A new campus was built in 2006 at 1101 N. Missouri Street.

== Sports ==
West Memphis Christian School has fielded varsity sports teams since the early 1970s. The school's mascot is the Black Knight. WMCS competes in Division 1AA in the Mississippi Association of Independent Schools.
