= John S. Mosby Academy =

Location
- Front Royal, Virginia
- Coordinates: 38.936222°N 78.2038893°W

Information
- Type: Private
- Opened: 1959
- Closed: 1969
- Grades: 8-12

John S. Mosby Academy was a private high school in Front Royal, Virginia, established in 1959 when the city's schools were ordered to desegregate following the landmark Brown v. Board of Education Supreme Court ruling. It was named for John S. Mosby, a Confederate colonel.

The same year, Warren County built Criser High School (1-12) for black children. Mosby and Criser were part of a political stratagem called massive resistance.

== Construction and funding ==
The school was initially proposed by Chuck Leadman, business agent of the local branch of the Textile Workers Union of America. Leadman solicited $1-per-week donations from his union members to pay for its construction. Leadman described Front Royal as a racial "utopia" free of violence, although the local white population fired live ammunition at a black church when its pastor opposed the project. When the Textile Workers Union international learned of Leadman's project, they froze the local's assets and seized the donations. A court upheld their actions and Leadman was subsequently removed from his position.

With the union funding seized, tuition at Mosby was covered in part by state tuition grants. Grants to a "nonprofit, nonsectarian private school", even segregation academies, were upheld by the Third Circuit Court of Appeals. On March 9, 1965, in Griffin v. State Board of Education state tuition grants to white-only schools were found to be unconstitutional.

== Enrollment and closure ==
In 1961, 1000 students enrolled in the school. However, enrollment sharply dropped with the end of state subsidies, and the school closed in 1969.
