= Flint River Academy =

Location
- 11556 E. Highway 85; Woodbury, Georgia; Meriwether County; 32°59′33″N 84°34′19″W

Information
- Type: Private
- Motto: "Mind, Body, Spirit"
- Established: 1967; 59 years ago
- NCES School ID: 00297565
- Headmaster: Alton White
- Faculty: 22 (on an FTE basis)
- Grades: K3 to 12
- Gender: Coeducational
- Enrollment: 213 (2018)
- Student to teacher ratio: 8.9
- Colors: Black and gold
- Athletics conference: GIAA
- Sports: Football, track, baseball, basketball, tennis, golf, cheerleading, softball, twirl
- Nickname: Wildcats
- Affiliations: Georgia Independent School Association Georgia Independent Athletic Association
- Website: flintriveracademy.com
- Last updated: 13 June 2026

Flint River Academy (FRA) was created as a segregation academy in Woodbury, Georgia, United States. It is a member of the Georgia Independent School Association. The school was founded in 1967, when the Federal government was beginning to mandate school integration. The school educates students in grades PK-12 and while the school handbook says it does not discriminate based on race, as of 2020 the overwhelming majority of students were white.

== History ==
As of 1970, the students were bused to the school from 13 counties. The school urged parents to pool funds to buy buses and pay drivers. According to the Southern Regional Council, 45% of FRA students were bused to school, with an average one way travel distance of 20 miles.

In 1972, Flint River Academy was expelled from Georgia Association of Independent Schools because the school refused to cut ties with segregationists. Segregationist Georgia Governor Lester Maddox dedicated the school at its opening.

== Demographics ==
Although the school handbook states the school does not discriminate based on race, 209 of 212 students, or 98.6%, were white as of 2020. As of the 2020 school year, the school reported to the NCES that they had 212 students in kindergarten through 12th grade. Of those, 209 or 98.6% were White, 2, or less than 1% were Black, and 1 was of two or more races. The city of Woodbury is 38% White, while the county is 40% White.

== Activities ==
Students at Flint River Academy compete in art shows, Literary, and One Act play. Flint River Academy won first place in 2011 in the GISA AA Division of Math Bowl in Americus, Georgia at Georgia Southwestern State University. The Math Bowl team claimed more than 20 consecutive first place finishes under the guidance of Ms. Kay Barnes.

== Athletics ==
The boys track team won the 1990 GISA AA state championship. The softball team won the GISA state championship in 2011, 2013 & 2014. The football team has won multiple state championships (1980, 2005, 2007, 2016, 2018, 2023). The Lady Cats won state basketball championships in 1971 and 1973 while the boys team won state in 2018. The Wildcats baseball team won state in 2008. The 1990s was a particularly strong decade for the school as it claimed multiple region championships in boys basketball, tennis and football.

== Campus ==
In 2011, Flint River Academy added a 13,000-square-foot (1,200 m^{2}) building for students in grades 5 through 8.
