= Seth Adams =

American football player (born 1985)

Profile
- Position: Quarterback

Personal information
- Born: May 15, 1985 (age 41); Holly Springs, Mississippi
- Listed height: 6 ft 4 in (1.93 m)
- Listed weight: 225 lb (102 kg)

Career information
- High school: Marshall Academy (Holly Springs, Mississippi)
- College: Delta State Statesmen (2004); Hinds Community College Eagles (2005); Ole Miss Rebels (2006–2007)

Seth Henry Adams (born May 15, 1985) is an American former football player from Holly Springs in northern Mississippi. He played quarterback for the University of Mississippi Rebels in the Southeastern Conference.

== Early life ==
Adams is the son of Lorena and Gary Adams. His mother is a nurse and his father is a minister. He attended Strider Academy in Charleston, Mississippi, for elementary school and Marshall Academy in Holly Springs for middle and high school.

He emerged as a starter at Marshall Academy; as a senior, he completed 151-of-238 passes for 1,904 and 19 touchdowns. In the playoffs, he led Marshall past Winston Academy in overtime.

== College career ==
He had hoped for a Division 1 scholarship offer, but accepted a scholarship offer to Delta State University, a division 2 school. Scott Eyster, a four-year finalist for the Conerly Trophy, would beat him out as a freshman. This led to Adams transferring to Hinds Community College for one season. Hinds only played seven games that year, as several games were cancelled due to Hurricane Katrina, but Adams threw for 1,500 yards and 13 touchdowns and received a scholarship offer to Western Carolina University, a Division I-AA program. Ole Miss assistant coach Hugh Freeze convinced Adams to meet with coach Ed Orgeron. Adams agreed to walk on to the Ole Miss team. Orgeron informed Adams that he was trying to sign Brent Schaeffer, but he assured him of an opportunity to compete. After backing up Schaeffer in 2006, Adams beat him out for the starting job in 2007. Adams finished his career at Ole Miss with totals of 2,156 yards passing, 12 touchdowns, and 16 interceptions.
