= Christ Missionary and Industrial College =

Parochial school in Jackson, Mississippi, US

Coordinates: 32.3461°N 90.2049°W

Christ Missionary and Industrial College (CM&I), originally Christ's Holiness School, is a parochial school in Jackson, Mississippi. It serves African American students. A historical marker erected in 1992 commemorates the school's history.

== History ==
In 1897 the school was founded as Christ's Holiness School by the Church of God in Christ, later the Church of Christ (Holiness) U.S.A. In 1908, it moved to its current location on Main Street and was renamed Christ Missionary & Industrial College. The principal is Stan Beasley.

The school mascot is a crusader and the school colors are royal blue and white. Sports teams at the school include baseball, basketball, and football. In 2000, the school became the first all-black team to participate in a contest sanctioned by the Mississippi Private School Association (MPSA), which was founded as an organization for segregation academies that originally existed to avoid integration of whites and blacks in public schools.

G. G. Mosley served as principal of the school. Chas. P. Jones was principal in 1922.

In 2020 the school was vandalized. Buildings on the campus were damaged by a February 2021 ice storm.

Willenham Castilla graduated from the school.

== See also ==
- List of private schools in Mississippi
