= Calhoun Academy (Mississippi) =

Segregation academy in Mississippi, United States

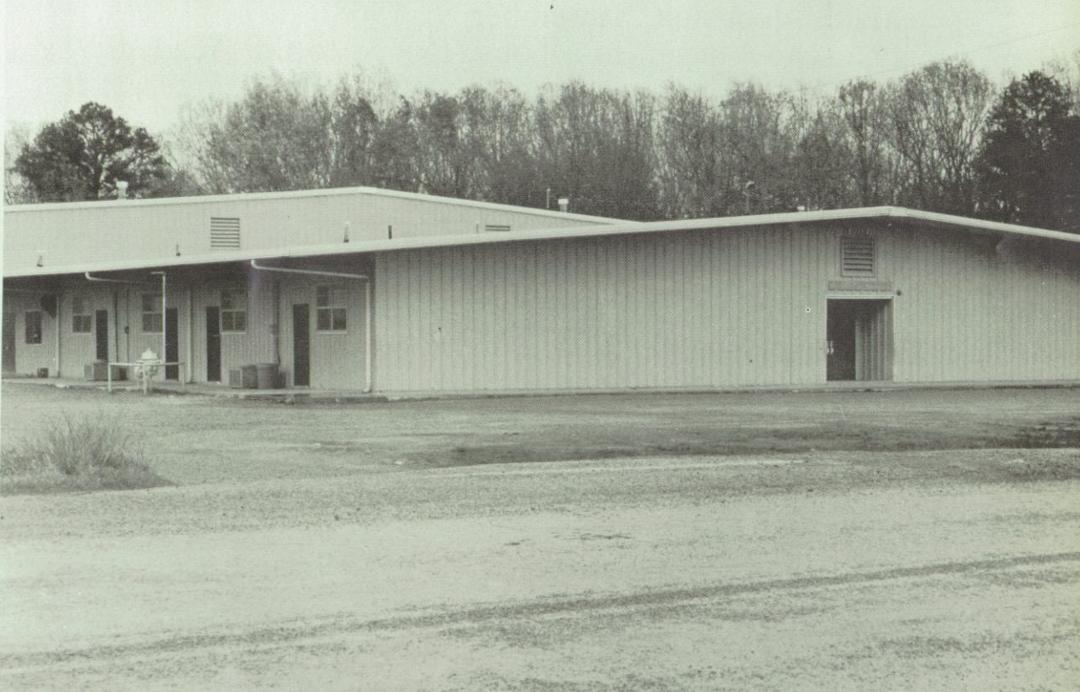
- Calhoun Academy in 1984

Location
- 9 County Road 406; Pittsboro, Mississippi 38916; United States; 33.914434°N 89.3259218°W

Information
- Type: Private
- Established: 1968
- Founders: Segregationists
- NCES School ID: A9303329
- Headmaster: Donald Pendergrast
- Grades: PK-12
- Enrollment: 105 (2018)
- Nickname: Cougars
- Accreditation: Midsouth Association of Independent Schools
- Affiliation: Baptist
- Website: https://www.calhounacademycougars.org

Calhoun Academy (CA) is a private school in Pittsboro, Mississippi, founded in 1968 as a segregation academy.

== History ==
Calhoun Academy is a racially discriminatory institution formed in the wake of public school desegregation to provide a haven for segregated education.

— William Colbert Keady, Cook v. Hudson

When the Federal government began forcing Mississippi schools to accept black students, many white parents sought ways to avoid sending their children to school with black children. In 1968, Calhoun Academy was created to give white students the opportunity of a segregated education.

In 1970, Calhoun Academy lost its tax exempt status when it declined to share its admissions policies with the IRS.

In 1972, the Calhoun County board of education adopted a policy that public school teachers must enroll their children in public schools as a condition of retaining their employment. When three teachers were dismissed under this policy, they sued in federal court, alleging that the schoolboard had violated their First Amendment right to freedom of association and Fourteenth Amendment rights to due process and equal protection. District court Judge William Keady ruled that Calhoun Academy was a racially discriminatory institution and the school board's policy was a permissible regulation to eliminate racial discrimination. The ruling was upheld in a 2-1 ruling by the 5th Circuit Court of Appeals. The Supreme Court initially agreed to review the case, but ultimately declined to hear an appeal.

In 1999 a white supremacist group, the Council of Conservative Citizens, reported that they had raised over $100,000 for Calhoun Academy. In 2011, at the urging of the Midsouth Association of Independent Schools, the school cut ties to the group. By 2016, the school had been given tax exempt status by the IRS.

== Campus ==
The campus is located at the intersection of Highway 9 and Academy Road.

== Drug testing ==
All students in grades 6-12 are subject to mandatory drug testing.

== Demographics ==
As of 2012, the student population was 100% white. In the 2015-2016 school year, the school had 155 students, all of whom were white. In the 2018 school year, attendance was 105, 104 of whom were white and 1 of whom was Hispanic.
