= Tabernacle Baptist Academy =

Location
- West Memphis, Arkansas
- Coordinates: 35.1513194°N 90.1824148°W

Information
- Type: Private
- Denomination: Baptist
- Founded: 1970
- Status: closed
- Yearbook: Corral

Tabernacle Baptist Academy was a private school in West Memphis, Arkansas.

== History ==
Tabernacle was founded in 1970 as a segregation academy. Travis Case, the pastor of Tabernacle Baptist Church, said, "... if any blacks show up at Tabernacle Baptist Academy, they will be turned away. It has nothing to do with race. We are not anti-Negro."

Tabernacle lost its tax-exempt status in 1970.

== Campus ==
The church, which had operated preschools and kindergartens before, built first a 4,800 square feet (450 m^{2}) building for the school.
