= Blessed Sacrament Huguenot Catholic School =

The Blessed Sacrament Huguenot School (BSH)
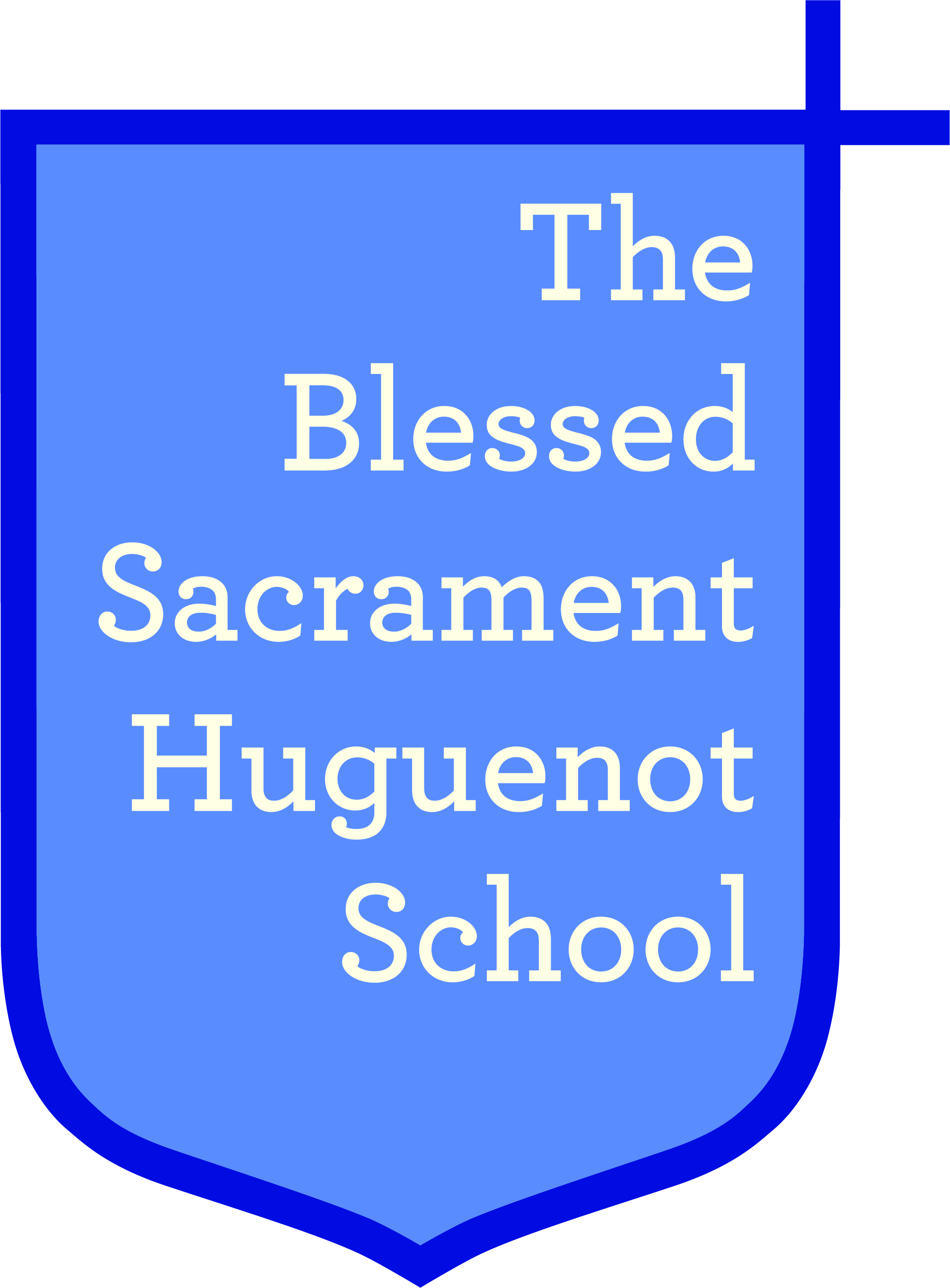

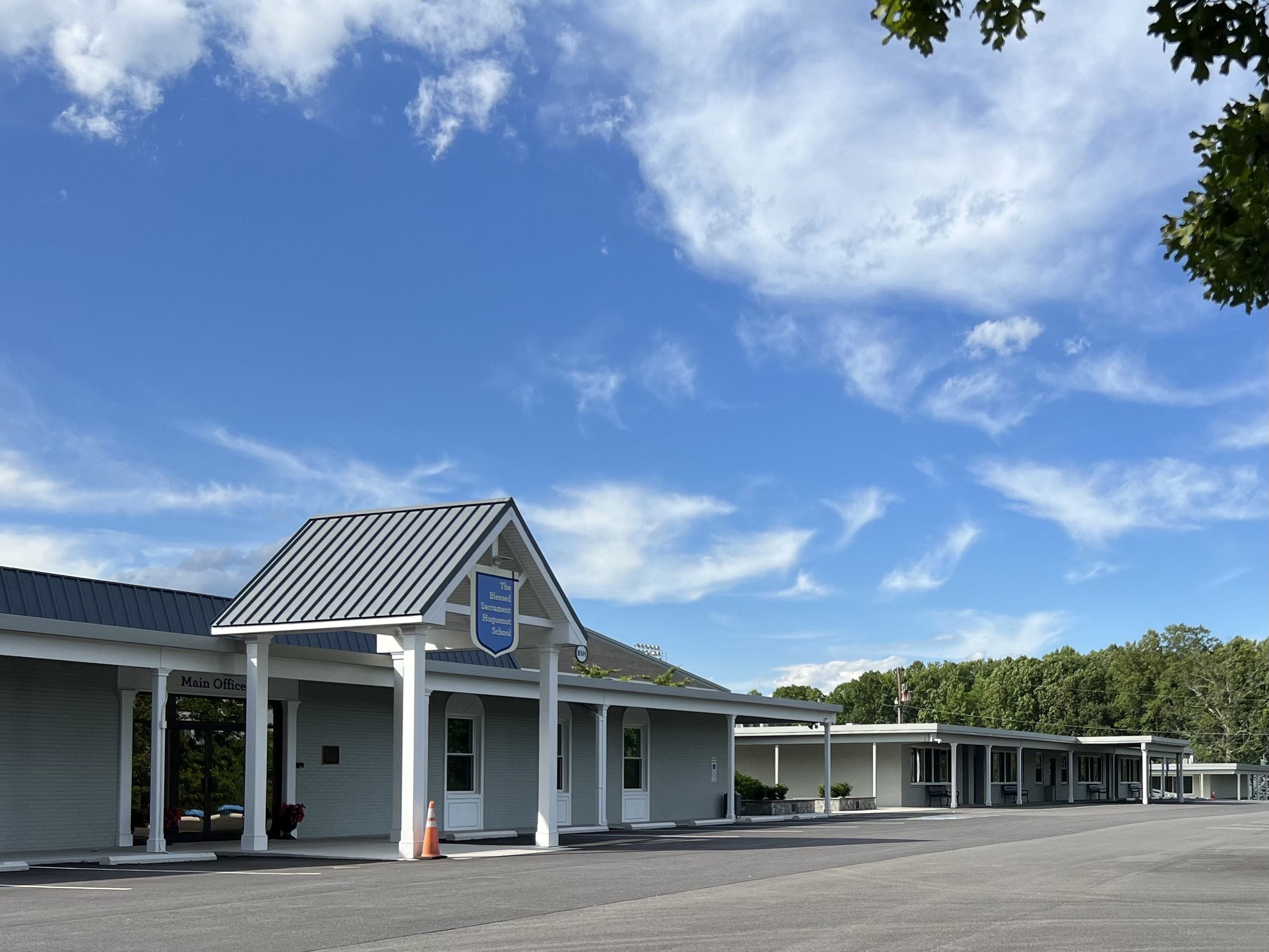

Location
- 2501 Academy Road; Powhatan, Virginia 23139
- Coordinates: 37°33′29″N 77°53′5″W

Information
- School type: Private, coeducational Catholic, college prep
- Religious affiliation: Christianity
- Denomination: Roman Catholic
- Founded: 1959
- Head of school: Tracy Hamner
- Grades: Pre-kindergarten–12
- Gender: Coed
- Age: Early Learners Age 2 to Grade 12
- Enrollment: 510 (2024)
- Hours in school day: 7.75
- Campus size: 40 acres (16 ha)
- Campus type: Outdoor
- Colors: Navy blue and gray
- Slogan: I am a Knight
- Athletics conference: Virginia Colonial Conference
- Sports: Football, cross-country, cheer-leading, basketball, volleyball, swimming, baseball, softball, soccer, golf, strength and conditioning
- Mascot: Knight
- Nickname: BSH
- Team name: Knights
- Accreditation: Southern Association of Colleges and Schools
- Website: www.bshknights.org

Blessed Sacrament Huguenot is the only private, co-ed, Early Learners through Grade 12 Catholic school in the Greater Richmond Region. Located on a 40-acre (16 ha) campus in Powhatan, Virginia, BSH is part of the Roman Catholic Diocese of Richmond. Students of any faith background are eligible for admission.

== Background ==
Huguenot Academy was a segregation academy founded in Powhatan, Virginia, in 1959. It was originally housed in the basement of a local bank, but expanded when local business leaders donated land and resources. By 1970, enrollment in grades kindergarten through twelve approached 500. Huguenot Academy was known as a reputable academic institution well into the late 1980s, with enrollment approaching 750 at its peak. But the 1990s brought difficulties for the school. The Powhatan County public school system grew more healthy and Huguenot Academy found it difficult to retain students and teachers.

Blessed Sacrament High School purchased Huguenot Academy in 1998, blending the already-built facilities and infrastructure of Huguenot Academy with the financial resources of the Catholic Diocese of Richmond.
