= Pillow Academy =

Segregation academy in Mississippi

Location
- 69601 U.S. Highway 82 West; Greenwood, Mississippi 38930; United States; 33°32′03″N 90°15′16″W

Information
- Type: Private
- Established: 1966
- Grades: K-12
- Colors: Green and gold
- Nickname: Mustangs
- Accreditation: Southern Association of Colleges and Schools
- Affiliation: Mississippi Association of Independent Schools
- Website: www.pillowacademy.com
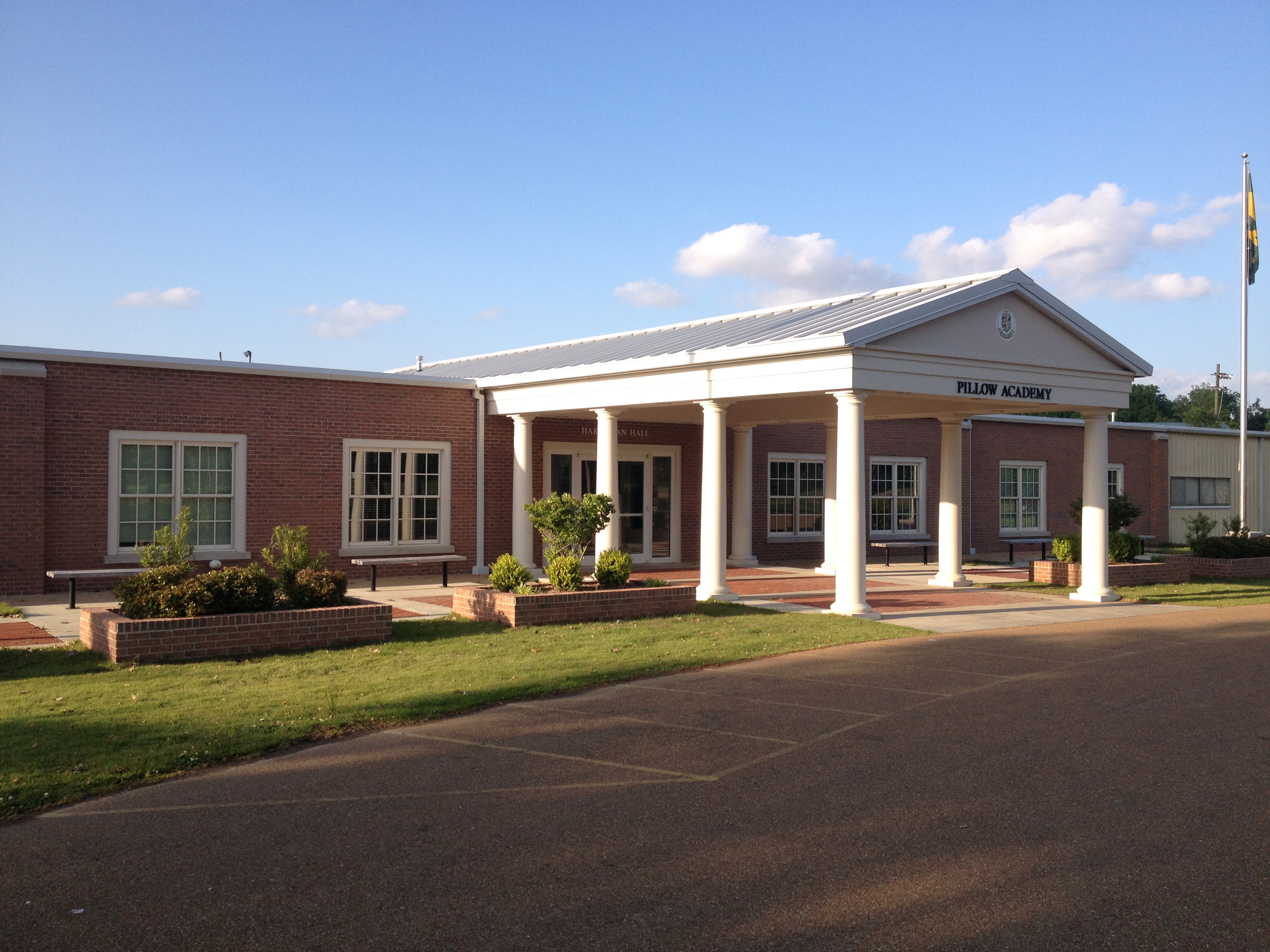
- Pillow Academy campus
- Last updated: 5 January 2018

Pillow Academy (PA) is an independent, co-educational college preparatory school in unincorporated Leflore County, Mississippi, near Greenwood. It was founded by white parents in 1966 as a segregation academy to avoid having their children attend school with black children.

== History ==
The school opened with grades K-8 in 1966. It began as a segregation academy, started in resistance to the integration of the public school system ordered by federal courts more than a decade after segregated schools were ruled to be unconstitutional. From 1967-1969 grades 9 and 10 were established. In 1969 a new high school building was built, and grades 11 and 12 were added. One of the founders of the Pillow Academy was Robert B. Patterson, also founder of the Association of White Citizens' Councils, which opposed the civil rights movement, including allowing African Americans their constitutional right to vote.

A 1970 marketing brochure for Pillow Academy stated that one of the benefits of attending the school was that classroom discussions could take place without "causing embarrassment to social or ethnic groups."

As of 1989, Pillow Academy had adopted a non-discriminatory admissions policy, but did not have any black students. The headmaster Thomas Thompson told the Clarion-Ledger that he was hopeful black students would enroll because "It would help us secure grants."

In a 10-year period until 1998, enrollment at Pillow grew by almost 25%. Many white students who would have otherwise attended public schools, which were becoming mostly black, attended Pillow. In 1998 Richard Rubin of The New York Times wrote, "Whites in Greenwood are much more likely today than they were 10 years ago to openly admit that they send their children to Pillow Academy not because it is a better school but because of its racial composition."

As of 2018, Pillow Academy was 90 percent white students.

== Campus ==
The 58-acre (23 ha) campus is located along U.S. Highway 82, 3 miles (4.8 km) west of Greenwood.

== Student body ==
In the 2010–2011 school year the school had 816 students. Students come from Leflore, Carroll, Grenada, Holmes, Sunflower, Tallahatchie, and Washington counties.

The New York Times noted that Pillow Academy enrolled almost 800 students for the 1997–98 school year; none was black. A decade before, the public high school had about equal numbers of black and white students but by 1998 was predominantly black. The Academy was also economically segregated, as most of its students were middle-class, in an area where many African Americans were poor.

In the 2009–2010 school year, the demographic profile of the student body was 96.0% white, 1.7% black, and 1.9% Asian. By comparison, the 2010 demographic profile of Leflore County showed the population as 24.9% white, 72.7% black, and 0.6% Asian.

== Notable alumni ==
- Louis Coleman, former Major League Baseball pitcher
- Jonathan Nichols, former football player
- Stewart Patridge, former football player

== See also ==
- List of Private Schools in Mississippi
