= Nansemond-Suffolk Academy =

Private Pre-K-12 Academy in Suffolk, Virginia

Coordinates: 36°46′29.7″N 76°37′12.2″W

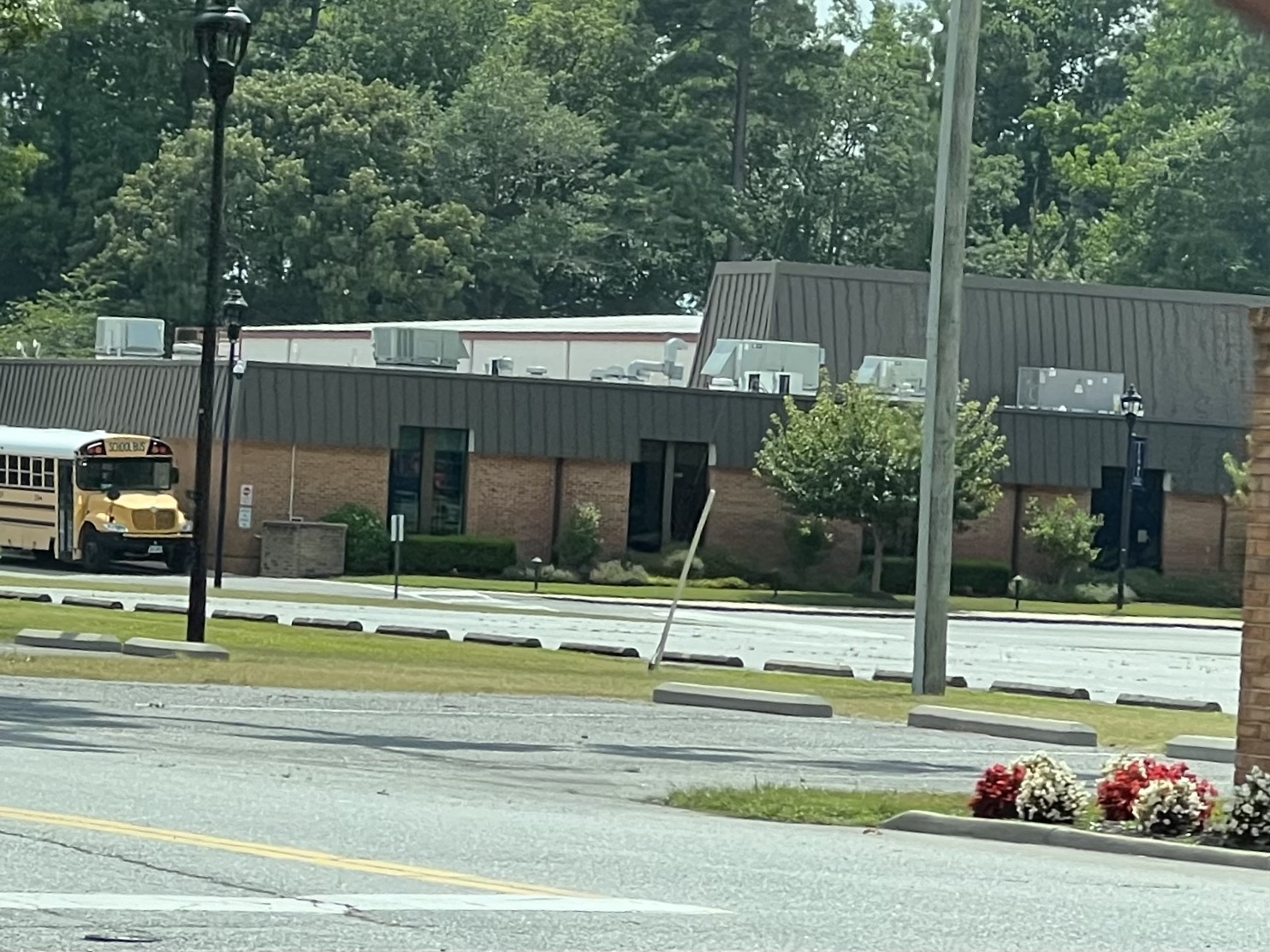
- Suffolk, Virginia, United States

Information
- Type: Private, Co-educational
- Motto: "Honor Above All"
- NCES School ID: 01434092
- Head of school: Mike Barclay
- Grades: PreK-12
- Enrollment: 874 students
- Colors: Blue and Gold
- Mascot: Bernie
- Nickname: Saints
- Endowment: $2.5 million
- Website: Official website

Nansemond-Suffolk Academy (NSA) is an independent, coeducational, college-preparatory school founded in 1966 in Suffolk, Virginia. NSA has two campuses. The Main Campus (adjacent to downtown Suffolk) includes 166,000 square feet of educational space situated on a 100 acre wooded campus, and includes the school's athletic facilities and educational space for students from pre-kindergarten to grade 12. The Harbour View Campus, which opened in 2016, includes an additional 22,000 square foot building for students in pre-kindergarten through grade 3.

== History ==
Nansemond-Suffolk Academy was founded in 1966 as a segregation academy. In 2014, the school spent $500,000 on needs-based scholarships. 9% of the student body of 1,040 were minorities compared to a local population that is 55% minority.

== Athletics ==
The Nansemond-Suffolk Academy football team was commended by the Virginia General Assembly in 2010.

In November 2015, the Nansemond-Suffolk Academy football team won the Virginia Independent Schools Athletic Association Division III state championship. This was the fourth state championship for Saints football.

Beginning their streak in May 2019, the Nansemond-Suffolk Academy Varsity girls' softball team has won five consecutive Virginia Independent Schools Athletic Association (VISAA) Division II State Championships.

The varsity boys' lacrosse team won state VISAA Division II championships in 2019 and 2024.
