= Cruger-Tchula Academy =

Defunct segregation academy in Mississippi

Coordinates: 33.3195°N 90.2389°W

Cruger-Tchula Academy (CTA) was an independent, co-educational college preparatory school located off US Highway 49 in Cruger, Holmes County, Mississippi. The school was founded in 1965 as the first segregation academy in Mississippi, and closed in 2001.

== History ==
Cruger-Tchula Academy was established in 1965 and was a member of the Mississippi Private School Association. The school closed in 2001.
