= J. B. Fuqua =

American businessman

- Born: John Brooks Elam Jr. June 26, 1918; Prince Edward County, Virginia, U.S.
- Died: April 2, 2006 (aged 87); Atlanta, Georgia, U.S.
- Occupation: Business executive
- Known for: Philanthropy
- Political party: Democratic Party
- Spouse: Dorothy Chapman Fuqua
- Children: 2

John Brooks Fuqua (Note: Fuqua's draft registration card of October 1940 indicated he had a middle initial of "B." but no actual middle name.) (pronounced /ˈfjuːkwə/, born John Brooks Elam Jr., June 26, 1918 – April 2, 2006) (Note: Date of death is per the Social Security Death Index; contemporary newspaper reports, quoting his wife, indicated he died several days later.) was an American businessman, philanthropist, and chairman of The Fuqua Companies and Fuqua Enterprises. The Fuqua School of Business at Duke University is named after him, as is the Fuqua School in Farmville, Virginia. He was active in politics for the Democratic Party, serving in both houses of the Georgia General Assembly and serving four years as the state party chair.

== Early years and education ==
John Brooks Elam Jr. was born on June 26, 1918, in Prince Edward County, Virginia, to John B. Elam (November 15, 1890 – ?) and Ruth Fuqua Elam (July 31, 1892 – September 7, 1918). His mother died two months after his birth; he was adopted by his maternal grandparents, who raised him on a small tobacco farm, and changed his last name to Fuqua. He graduated from Prospect high school, in Prospect, Virginia. His great-grandfather John Fuqua is credited with founding the town of Fuquay Springs in North Carolina, now part of Fuquay-Varina, North Carolina.

Fuqua formed a number of successful business conglomerates. After listening to WRVA from an early age, he pursued his interest in radio by earning his commercial operator's license at age 17.

As an adolescent, Fuqua educated himself by requesting books from the Duke University Library to be mailed to his farm. He credited Duke's lending program with enabling him to learn about business techniques.

== Business and politics ==
From the 1950s to the 1990s, Fuqua developed several businesses. For example, he developed dealership locations for lawnmower manufacturer Snapper. He also developed multiple media outlets, including WJBF-TV in Augusta, Georgia, which was a TV station whose call sign shared the initials of his name. He had additional ventures in real estate, insurance, banking, soft drink manufacturing, and auto finance, which were operated under the name Fuqua Industries. Fuqua Industries engaged in business patterns common to conglomerates. For example, Fuqua Industries purchased Pacemaker Yachts, Inc. (which included the wholly owned Egg Harbor brand) in 1968. A decade later, in 1976, Pacemaker was sold to Mission Marine & Associates.

In 1989, Fuqua retired as chairman from Fuqua Industries, selling stock he had in the company. In 1993, Fuqua paid $1 million to Fuqua Industries to remove his name from the company he had started, and was no longer connected to. His former company renamed itself to Actava Group, which later merged into Metromedia International.

In 1989, Fuqua acquired 35 percent of Vista Resources, renaming it Fuqua Enterprises in 1995. Fuqua and his son owned nearly 40 percent of the company's common stock. He repeated what he did with his previous company acquiring different businesses this time in the areas such as the leather business and medical equipment.

Fuqua was active in politics for much of his life; he was a member of the Democratic Party. On November 7, 1957, he was elected to the Georgia House of Representatives, to fill the unexpired term of Richard Lee Chambers III, who had resigned on October 10. This was during the period of the County Unit System in Georgia, so that Fuqua was one of three House members representing Richmond County. He was re-elected to two additional full terms in the House, before running for a seat in the State Senate. In 1962, Fuqua was elected to the Georgia Senate, taking office in January 1963, in a district previously represented by Carl Sanders. He served one term in the State Senate. From 1962 to 1966, Fuqua chaired the Democratic Party of Georgia. He was a close friend and supporter of presidents Lyndon B. Johnson and Jimmy Carter, and former Savannah mayor and billionaire Julius Curtis Lewis Jr.

In 1974, Fuqua received the Golden Plate Award of the American Academy of Achievement. In 1986, he received an honorary degree in Doctor of Laws from Oglethorpe University. In 2002, Fuqua was inducted into the Junior Achievement's U.S. Business Hall of Fame.

Fuqua died in Atlanta in April 2006 due to complications from bronchitis.

== Philanthropy ==
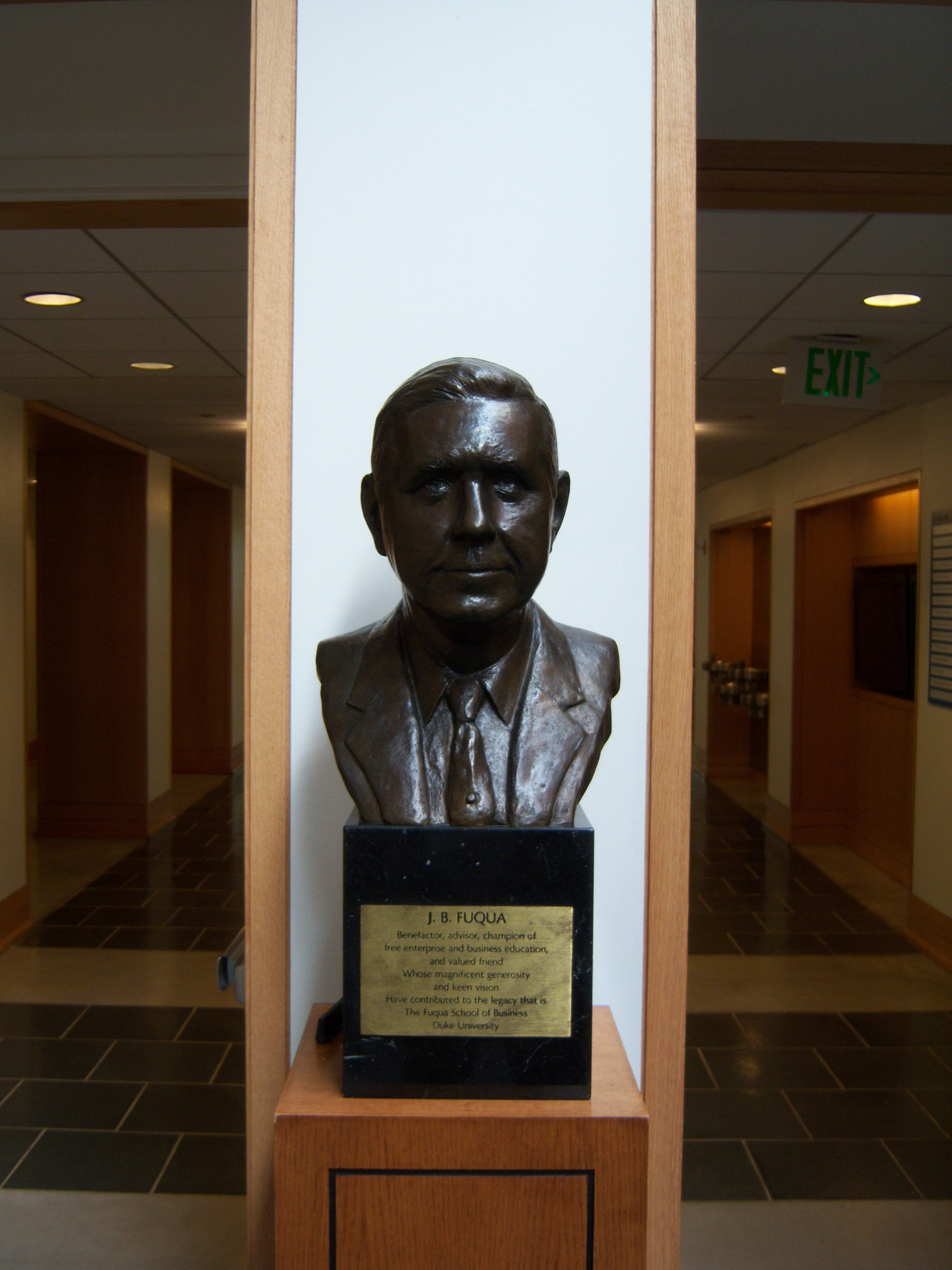
A bust of Fuqua in the Hall of Flags at the Fuqua School of Business

In the 1970s, Fuqua demonstrated his considerable gratitude to Duke University by donating $10 million to its business school, which was subsequently renamed after him, becoming the Fuqua School of Business. His giving to the university totaled almost $40 million. He was an honorary alumnus of Duke.

In 1987, Fuqua donated a $5.5 million conservatory to the Atlanta Botanical Garden, naming it the Dorothy Chapman Fuqua Conservatory. This conservatory was opened to highlight the botanical richness of selected tropical and desert regions around the world, and to educate visitors on issues of conservation and plant use. It contains 16,000 square feet (1,500 m^{2}) of display area under glass, with priority given to plant groups that are rare, threatened, or endangered.

Another of Fuqua's philanthropic projects was the Fuqua School in Farmville, Virginia, formerly the Prince Edward Academy. His gift of $10 million in 1993 and a subsequent donation of over $2 million were pledged with the goal of transforming the school from a small private institution on the verge of bankruptcy into a model for rural pre-K-12 education.

In February 1995, Fuqua donated $3 million to the Heart Center of Atlanta to honor his wife, Dorothy, on their 50th wedding anniversary. To recognize his generosity, the program was renamed the Fuqua Heart Center of Atlanta. In 1999, Fuqua contributed another $3 million to the Fuqua Heart Center to implement cardiac education programs for patients, their families, and the community, and in 2008 the J. B. Fuqua Trust awarded a $5 million bequest, which represented the largest estate gift to Piedmont Hospital in its 102-year history.
