= Fairfax-Brewster School =

Private school in Virginia, United States

Location
- Bailey's Crossroads, Virginia; 38.855067°N 77.1343409°W

Information
- Type: Private
- Opened: 1955
- Grades: K-6

The Fairfax-Brewster School was a private K-6 elementary school in Bailey's Crossroads, Virginia. The school was founded in 1954 by Stuart A. Reiss and Robert S. Reiss, with Robert's wife Olga also serving in an administrative role. The school began operating in 1955 with an average enrollment of 21 students. The Fairfax-Brewster School opened a summer camp the following year, also serving students in Kindergarten through 6th grade. By 1962, 21 students attended the summer camp.

The proximity of the school's founding to Brown v. Board of Education ruling desegregating public schools has led some legal scholars to describe Fairfax-Brester as a segregation academy.

By 1972, enrollment at the Fairfax-Brewster School had grown to 236 students during the school year and 223 students at the summer camp. No black student had ever been enrolled in the school or summer camp. The school faced a federal lawsuit in 1973 (Runyon v. McCrary) after denying admission to a black child, Colin M. Gonzales. The school denied having discriminated against black students, saying that Gonzales was not admitted because he would not qualify to begin first grade. The court found that Gonzales was denied admission solely because of his race, a decision that was upheld on appeal to the 4th Circuit Court of Appeals and the Supreme Court.

The Reiss family continued to own and operate the Fairfax-Brewster School until Olga and Robert retired in 1987 and 1988, respectively. By 1989, Norma Brill had become the owner and director of the school and summer camp. The school was sold to Chancellor Beacon Academies in 2000, which was later acquired by Imagine Schools.

In 2006, the school was torn down and several homes were built on the property, most of which have an address on Brill Court, a street named after former owner Norma Brill.
