= Runyon v. McCrary =

- Supreme Court of the United States

Argued April 26, 1976 Decided June 25, 1976
- Full case name: Runyon, et ux., dba Bobbe's School v. McCrary, et al.
- Citations: 427 U.S. 160 (more) 96 S. Ct. 2586, 49 L. Ed. 2d 415, 1976 U.S. LEXIS 7
- Argument: Oral argument

Holding
- Federal law prohibits private schools from discriminating on the basis of race.

Court membership
- Chief Justice Warren E. Burger Associate Justices William J. Brennan Jr. · Potter Stewart; Byron White · Thurgood Marshall; Harry Blackmun · Lewis F. Powell Jr. William Rehnquist · John P. Stevens

Case opinions
- Majority: Stewart, joined by Burger, Brennan, Marshall, Blackmun, Powell, Stevens
- Concurrence: Powell
- Concurrence: Stevens
- Dissent: White, joined by Rehnquist

Laws applied
- Civil Rights Act of 1866

Runyon v. McCrary, 427 U.S. 160 (1976), is a landmark case by the United States Supreme Court, which ruled that private schools that discriminate on the basis of race or establish racial segregation are in violation of federal law. Whereas Brown v. Board of Education barred segregation by public schools, this case barred segregation in private schools. This decision is built on Jones v. Alfred H. Mayer Co. another landmark civil rights case that affirmed the federal government's ability to penalize racist acts by private actors.

Dissenting Justices Byron White and William Rehnquist argued that the legislative history of 42 U.S.C. § 1981 (popularly known as the Civil Rights Act of 1866) indicated that the Act was not designed to prohibit private racial discrimination, but only state-sponsored racial discrimination (as had been held in the Civil Rights Cases of 1883).

== Background ==
Two African American students, Michael McCrary and Colin Gonzales, filed suit believing that they were denied admission to private schools in Virginia based on their race. McCrary and Gonzales were denied admission to Bobbe's School; Gonzales was also denied admission to Fairfax-Brewster School. A class action was filed against the schools by the parents of both students. A federal district court ruled for McCrary and Gonzales, finding that the school's admission policies were racially discriminatory. The United States Court of Appeals affirmed the decision.

Russell and Katheryne Runyon d.b.a Bobbe's School and Fairfax-Brewster School were schools in Northern Virginia. Bobbe's was founded in 1958 as a segregation academy with five European-American students. By 1972 it had grown to 200, but had never admitted a black child. Fairfax-Brewster had a similar history from 1955.

Both schools explicitly told the families they did not admit non-white students and rejected the children (Colin Gonzales and Michael McCrary) because of their race. A federal district court found that this racial discrimination violated a federal civil rights law (42 U.S.C. § 1981). As a result, the court:

1. Ordered the schools to stop using race as a factor in admissions.
2. Awarded monetary compensation to the McCrary family and Colin Gonzales.
3. Ordered the schools to pay the families' attorney's fees ($1,000 each).

A federal appeals court reviewed the discrimination case against Fairfax-Brewster and Bobbe’s schools and agreed that the evidence clearly showed both schools had rejected the Gonzales and McCrary children solely because they were not white. The appeals court held firmly that the federal civil rights statute, 42 U.S.C. § 1981 is a "limitation upon private discrimination" that applies to private schools.

The court specifically rejected the schools' constitutional defenses. It found that their discriminatory policies were not shielded by a right to privacy or free association. The judges wrote that when an institution opens its doors to the public through advertising and admissions processes, it forfeits any claim to a "private" selection right that would justify racial exclusion. However, it reversed the lower court on one point: it set aside the order for the schools to pay the families' attorneys' fees. In all other respects, the ruling against the schools stood.

== Questions before the Court ==
1. Were the admission policies of the private schools in violation of 42 U.S.C. § 1981?
2. Did 42 U.S.C. § 1981 violate the Constitutional right to privacy and free association?

== Decision of the Supreme Court ==
In a 7–2 decision Justice Stewart wrote the opinion for the Court. The Civil Rights Act of 1866 (specifically § 1981 and § 1982) prohibited racial discrimination in private transactions. The reasoning, as set out in previous Supreme Court cases, is twofold:

1. Legislative Intent: Congress intended the law to ban all racial discrimination in private activities like making contracts (§ 1981) and buying/selling property (§ 1982).
2. Constitutional Authority: Congress has the power under the Thirteenth Amendment to outlaw such discrimination as a "badge or incident of slavery."

Jones v. Alfred H. Mayer Co. held that Congress had intended to prohibit "all racial discrimination, private and public" with respect to certain rights specified in the statute. The Jones decision found that Congress had the power under the Thirteenth Amendment to enact laws for the purpose of eradicating discriminatory practices as "badges and incidents of slavery". The court confirmed that the earlier logic from Jones (which banned racial discrimination in property sales via § 1982) applies equally to § 1981 (which covers contracts). The two laws have the same origin and purpose.

Specifically, the Court clarified in the Tillman v. Wheaton-Haven Recreation Assn. case that a private swimming club could not claim an exemption from either law. Later, in Johnson v. Railway Express Agency, it held explicitly that § 1981 provides a federal remedy against racial discrimination in private employment, solidifying its application to a major area of private contracting. Stewart wrote that the school's admission policies were a "classic violations of § 1981".

Moving on to consider the tension between the statute and parental rights over children's education, and the rights of free association and privacy, the Court acknowledged that parents may have the right to send their children to schools that "promote the belief [of] racial segregation", but neither parents' nor students' freedom of association was violated by the application of 42 U.S.C. §1981. The Court emphasized that private discrimination has never received protection under the First Amendment.

While several Supreme Court decisions have established strong parental rights over children's education, the court held that private schools did not have the right to refuse admission based solely on race. The Court cited Wisconsin v. Yoder which emphasized the importance of complying with state educational requirements, even in private schools.

In rejecting the theory that penumbral right of privacy in home and family life should be extended to parental control over children's education, the Court cited Pierce v. Society of Sisters and the right of the State "reasonably to regulate all schools" to further justify the decision.

== Dissenting opinion ==
Justice White was concerned about the potential far-reaching impact of holding private racial discrimination illegal, which, if taken to its logical conclusion, might ban many varied forms of voluntary self-segregation, including social and advocacy groups that limited their membership to blacks.

== Aftermath ==
Runyon's holding was severely limited in 1989 by Patterson v. McLean Credit Union, which narrowly construed Section 1981 as not applying to any discrimination occurring after the making of a contract, such as racial harassment on the job (although the Patterson majority expressly claimed that they were not overruling Runyon). In turn, Patterson was legislatively overruled by the Civil Rights Act of 1991.

Sonia Sotomayor cited Runyon in a dissenting opinion for 303 Creative LLC v. Elenis as precedent against the majority's allowing an exemption to antidiscrimination laws for businesses that provide services which are "pure speech". The 303 Creative decision did not overturn Runyon, however David D. Cole has said the Court's ruling was "deeply flawed" because it denied that the refusal of service was unlawful identity-based discrimination.

== See also ==
- List of United States Supreme Court cases, volume 427
- Jones v. Alfred H. Mayer Co., 392 U.S. 409 (1968)
- Brown v. Board of Education (similar case, but involved public schools)
- Coit v. Green
