= Orangeburg Preparatory Schools =

Location
- Upper Campus: 2651 North Road, NW; Lower Campus: 168 Prep Drive, NE; Orangeburg, Orangeburg County, South Carolina 29118; United States
- Coordinates: 33.52578°N 80.888798°W

Information
- Type: Independent
- Motto: Excellentia Educatione (Excellence in Education)
- Established: December 1984
- Oversight: Board of Directors
- Chairman: Dr. Thomas Gue
- Head of school: Libby Ray
- Grades: PreK to 12
- Gender: Co-educational
- Campus type: Suburban
- Colors: Red & Gray
- Athletics conference: South Carolina Independent Schools Athletic Association
- Team name: Indians
- Accreditations: Southern Association of Colleges and Schools; South Carolina Independent School Association
- Newspaper: Tribal Talk
- Yearbook: The Indian
- Website: www.orangeburgprep.com

Orangeburg Preparatory Schools, Inc. is an independent, college-preparatory, coeducational day school enrolling students in preschool through 12th grade. It is located in Orangeburg, South Carolina. Orangeburg Prep has two campuses: the Lower Campus, housing preschool to 5th grade; and the Upper Campus, housing grades 6 to 12. OPS also operates a year-round day care center on the Lower Campus. Orangeburg Prep was formed through the merger of two segregation academies, Wade Hampton Academy and Willington Academy.

== History ==
In the early 1960s, school desegregation was implemented in the American South, including in South Carolina. Across the region, many local whites established segregation academies; private, white-only schools designed to enable white children to be educated separately from blacks. Wade Hampton Academy, headed by local chemical manufacturer T. Elliott Wannamaker, and Head Upper School Teacher Sara T. Shuler, was such a segregation academy, founded in the fall of 1964 at the moment public schools in Orangeburg were ordered to desegregate. (Wade Hampton II was the owner of the greatest number of slaves in the South before the Civil War; Wade Hampton III was a Reconstruction era Redeemer.)

Two years before the school's founding, Wannamaker wrote, "Separation of the races in education, in recreation, in living quarters, and in churches is in the best interest of both races and is essential to the preservation of racial integrity." A group of Orangeburg parents concluded that "separate private school facilities must be provided...[to] avoid the pernicious 'experiment' being foisted upon the people of this state and nation."

Wade Hampton Academy enrolled nearly 300 white students at its opening in August 1964; an attempt to enroll two black children into the school at its launch was rejected. Wade Hampton Academy issued its first graduates a lapel pin featuring the Confederate flag and the word "Survivor," a pin modeled on those worn by Confederate veterans after the Civil War.

In 1970, Wannamaker also led the establishment of Orangeburg's second independent school, Willington Academy, less than a mile from the Wade Hampton campus. Wannamaker's son-in-law, Larry Plumb, who had served as assistant headmaster of Wade Hampton, became Willington's headmaster. During this period, Wannamaker also helped to establish the South Carolina Independent Schools Association, initially composed of other segregation academies and headquartered in Orangeburg, South Carolina, and served as the organization's first president.

Wannamaker also played a pivotal role in helping to establish other segregation academies throughout the southeastern United States during the 1960s and 1970s. Tom Turnipseed was the first executive director of the South Carolina Independent Schools Association and wrote about the strategy of the period: "Since we were following a longstanding Southern tradition of being racists in denial, we simply denied race had anything to do with our motives. Dr. Wannamaker and I often discussed how we should discreetly downplay race when asked by the media about the sudden flurry of private school activity, particularly in counties with large populations of blacks. We bristled with indignation when reporters referred to SCISA as an association of 'segregated academies.'"

By 1971, when public schools in Orangeburg were fully integrated, Wade Hampton Academy and Willington Academy enrolled about 1,500 white students. A number of locations related to Wade Hampton Academy, including its founding and later locations, are listed in the National Register of Historic Places as sites "associated with White Resistance."

The two schools continued to grow throughout the 1970s and 1980s and formed an intense rivalry, both academically and athletically. However, changes in the economy and a desire to expand the college-preparatory educational opportunities in the Orangeburg area led the boards of directors of both schools to announce that they would merge to form Orangeburg Preparatory Schools, Inc. In a letter to parents and students of both schools, H. Ciremba Amick, chair of the Wade Hampton Academy board, and Thomas B. Jackson, Jr., chair of the Willington Academy board, wrote:

During the past few years, there have been a considerable number of discussions among the parents of Wade Hampton and Willington Academies concerning a merger of the two schools. Many parents and friends of both institutions feel that such a consolidation would bring together the best of both schools.

After careful deliberation, the Boards of Directors make the following announcement: Wade Hampton Academy and Willington Academy will be[come] one school beginning with the 1986-87 school year.

The new school, to be named Orangeburg Preparatory Schools, Inc., will house four-year Kindergarten through fourth grade on the present Willington campus, and grades five through twelve on the present Wade Hampton campus.

Joining these two schools will greatly enhance the educational opportunities of both student bodies. Facilities for libraries, laboratories, music, the arts, and athletics would be doubled immediately. A more diversified curriculum and economy of operations are important factors. This will be the premier independent school in the state.

Wade Hampton Academy Headmaster Larry K. Watt was named headmaster of the new school, with Willington Academy's Head of School Ann O. Glover becoming associate headmaster and director of the lower campus. Students, parents, and teachers formed various transition teams between the time of the merger announcement and the beginning of the next school year, and the students of both Wade Hampton and Willington Academies voted to select the Indian as the new school's mascot and red and gray as the colors — one from each school, red from Willington and gray from Wade Hampton. (Wade Hampton Academy's teams had been the Rebels, Willington's the Patriots.)

In August 1986, OPS opened with an enrollment of more than 1,700 students, the largest enrollment ever at a South Carolina independent school, then or since. But the school faced difficulties: By 1989, enrollment was down to 950, as more white students returned to the public schools. In a 1989 Boston Globe report, the superintendent of Orangeburg's public schools, James Wilsford, credited Orangeburg Prep for stepping away from its segregationist traditions, saying it was "a big move towards accommodating the modern world." The Globe story stated that "[o]ne black student, the son of a physician, studied at Orangeburg Prep until his family moved back to Ohio recently."

By 2007, the Orangeburg public school system was 90% black, while Orangeburg Prep was still 95% white.

== Governance and classification ==
Orangeburg Preparatory Schools, Inc., is a 501(c)(3) not-for-profit organization as defined by the IRS. It is governed by a voluntary Board of Directors.

== Athletics ==
Orangeburg Prep, which is ranked Class AAA by the South Carolina Independent Schools Athletic Association, fields 34 athletic teams for girls and boys of the middle and upper school in football, basketball, volleyball, wrestling, cheerleading, tennis, chess, golf, track, bowling, baseball, softball, soccer, and cross country.

== Notable alumni ==
- Nikki Haley (Class of 1989) - 116th Governor of South Carolina and United States Ambassador to the United Nations
- Dennis Shedd (Class of 1971) - Judge, United States Court of Appeals for the Fourth Circuit
- Bill Spiers (Class of 1984) - Major League Baseball Player for the Milwaukee Brewers, New York Mets, and Houston Astros
