= Rock Hill Academy =

Location
- Charlottesville, Virginia
- Coordinates: 38.042081°N 78.473617°W

Information
- Type: Private
- Opened: 1959
- Closed: 1979
- Principal: William Story
- Grades: 8-12

Rock Hill Academy was a private high school in Charlottesville, Virginia, established in 1959 when the city's schools were closed rather than comply with orders to desegregate following the landmark Brown v. Board of Education Supreme Court ruling.

In 1958, federal courts ordered the city's public high schools, Lane High School and Jackson P. Burley High School to integrate. The city chose instead to close its schools in a political stratagem called Massive resistance. Rock Hill Academy (a high school) and the Robert E. Lee School (elementary) were founded by the Charlottesville Education Foundation and the Parents' Committee for Emergency Schooling in Charlottesville.

Tuition at Rock Hill was covered in part by state tuition grants. Grants to a "nonprofit, nonsectarian private school", even segregation academies, were upheld by the Third Circuit Court of Appeals.

The campus was taken over by Heritage Christian Academy (now defunct).
