= Houston Academy =

Segregation academy in Alabama

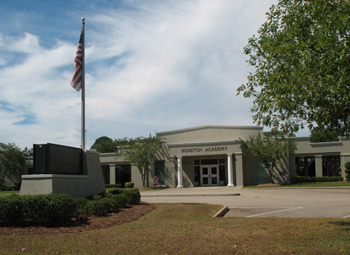
- Houston Academy's Main Office entrance

Location
- 901 Buena Vista Drive; Dothan, Alabama 36303; United States; 31°14′40″N 85°26′57″W

Information
- Type: Independent
- Established: 1970 (56 years ago)
- CEEB code: 010910
- Headmaster: Dr. Vince Janney
- Colors: Royal blue and Columbia blue
- Mascot: Raider
- Website: www.houstonacademy.com

Houston Academy is a non-profit independent college preparatory school in Dothan, Alabama. The school offers instruction to children from preschool through grade 12. The nineteen acre campus is located on the west side of Dothan in a middle class residential area.

== History ==
The school was founded in 1970 in response to integration of the public schools in Dothan, as a way to maintain segregated schooling under the guise of private education. This history received national attention in 2016, when Bill Clinton revealed in a campaign speech that his wife Hillary Clinton had made an undercover visit to the area investigating segregation academies in 1972. In 1970, the IRS allowed the school to retain its tax exempt status despite its policy of discriminating on racial grounds.

While the school no longer enforces a ban on non-white students, in 2015 only eight black students were enrolled and thirteen percent of the student population were minorities of any kind.

Mark Saliba, the current mayor of Dothan, was a chairman of the school's board from 2007 until 2014.
