= Jamestown Academy (Virginia) =

Location
- James City County, Virginia; 37.306149°N 76.73587299°W

Information
- Type: Private
- Opened: 1964
- Closed: 1989
- Grades: K-8
- Campus size: 8 acres (3.2 ha)
- Campus type: Suburban

Jamestown Academy was a private school in James City County, Virginia, established in 1964 when the local public schools were ordered to desegregate following the landmark Brown v. Board of Education Supreme Court ruling.

Tuition at Jamestown was covered in part by state tuition grants. Grants to a "nonprofit, nonsectarian private school", even segregation academies, were upheld by the Third Circuit Court of Appeals. On March 9, 1965, in Griffin v. State Board of Education, state tuition grants to white-only schools were found to be unconstitutional.

The school closed in 1989.
