= Isle of Wight Academy =

- 17111 Courthouse Highway, Isle of Wight, Virginia 23397

Location
- Coordinates: 36°54′27.7″N 76°42′23.7″W

Information
- Type: Private
- Established: 1967
- Head of school: Sigita Miltier
- Grades: Pre-K - 12th
- Enrollment: 682
- Mascot: Chargers
- Website: iwacademy.com

Isle of Wight Academy (IWA) is a private non-profit day school located in Isle of Wight County, Virginia. It was founded in 1967 as a segregation academy. The school has students from pre-kindergarten to 12th grade and is non-sectarian and coeducational.

== History ==
Isle of Wight Academy was founded in 1967 as a private academy by white parents seeking to avoid sending their children to racially integrated public schools. In the 1968–69 school year, the Isle of Wight County School Board sold a surplus school bus to the academy. The school board was later stripped of $99,000 in federal funds for aiding a racially segregated private school.

In the 1980s, the school's tax exempt status was revoked over the school's refusal to comply with federal anti-discrimination standards. Up to the mid-1980s, Isle of Wight Academy had never had a black student, teacher, or board member.

== Mission ==
The philosophy of Isle of Wight Academy is to "accept students of average or above average ability and develop them to their fullest potential by providing a quality program, which will build the student mentally, physically, and spiritually. The school emphasizes the honor, integrity, social development, and citizenship of the student."

== Academics ==
Isle of Wight Academy offers six dual-enrollment courses through a partnership with Paul D. Camp Community College and Richard Bland College, and two Advanced Placement (AP) courses.

== Extracurricular Activities ==
Isle of Wight Academy has a number of extracurricular activities for Upper and Lower School students. For the Upper School, clubs — such as the Student Council Organization (SCO), Key Club, Drama Club, and Science Club — have the largest degree of participation. The Upper School also has a number of academic competition teams, such as the Scholastic Bowl, Battle of the Brains, Science Bowl, Blue Crab Bowl, and Envirothon teams. The Upper School has chapters in four national honor societies, the National Honor Society, National Junior Honor Society, French National Honor Society, and Spanish National Honor Society. The Lower School has the Junior Student Cooperative Organization (JSCO) and the Middle School Science Club to offer academic enrichment outside of the classroom.

IWA offers half-credit courses in fine arts, such as Upper School Band, Chorus, and Audio Visual Technology. The Upper School participates in the Association of Virginia Academies (AVA) Forensics and Fine Arts competitions, where many students place high in their respective categories.

== Athletics ==
Isle of Wight Academy is a member of the Virginia Colonial Conference and Metro Athletic Conference. In its history, IWA has won 70 conference season championships, 35 conference tournament championships, and 11 state championships (five in softball, five in football, and one in baseball). It sponsors the following varsity and junior varsity sports: football, basketball, volleyball, baseball, softball, cross country, soccer, golf, and winter and fall cheerleading.

During his time at IWA in the mid-late 2000's, Daniel Brown was a three-sport athlete (basketball, football, and baseball). From 2005 to 2007, he helped the school win three consecutive state championships. He is a retired tight end of the National Football League (NFL).

== Notable alumni ==
- Daniel Brown (Class of 2010), former professional football (Now Retired) player of the Baltimore Ravens, Chicago Bears, Kansas City Chiefs, and New York Jets
