= Kirk Academy =

Segregation academy in Mississippi

Coordinates: 33.7523°N 89.8124°W

Kirk Academy is a K-12 Christian school in Grenada, Mississippi. It is part of the Mississippi Association of Independent Schools (MAIS). In 1966, when the public schools in Grenada County were integrated, some of the most violent acts of the civil rights movement ensued. For five months, violent White mobs congregated outside the schools to forcibly prevent African American students from entering. Kirk Academy was founded in 1966 in response to integration of the public schools and has been described as a segregation academy. As of 2018, all but 11 of the school's 385 students were white.

According to the school's website, it was founded in 1966 and named for W.H. Kirk, who donated thirty acres of land for the school. It expanded to a 65-acre campus that includes a preschool and elementary building, high school building, the A.R. Smithers Library, a gymnasium, two practice football fields, a football stadium, softball complex, baseball complex, soccer complex, and an outdoor classroom with nature trail.

Randy Poss was headmaster for five years until April 2018.

== Sports ==
The Raiderettes were Mississippi-Louisiana state champions in basketball in 1976. In 2018 the Raiderettes were again AAA MAIS champions with coach Amy Denley.

The Raiders were football champions in 1997. North State football champions in 1996, 1997, 2006, 2008, 2021, and 2023.

== Alumni ==
- Donna Tartt - Novelist.
