= Springwood School =

Segregation academy in Alabama

Coordinates: 32.876500°N 85.209697°W

Location
- 1814 Cherry Drive; Lanett, Alabama 36863; United States

Information
- School type: Private school
- Established: 1970
- Headmaster: Dr. Kim Baylis
- Teaching staff: 45.0 (on an FTE basis)
- Grades: PK–12
- Enrollment: 315 (2022-23)
- Student to teacher ratio: 7:1
- Colors: Red, black, and white
- Nickname: Wildcats
- Accreditation: Cognia
- Website: www.springwoodschool.com

Springwood School is a private school in Lanett, Alabama, United States. The school was founded in 1970 and has been described as segregation academy.
