= Al Madina School of Richmond =

Islamic school in Virginia, United States

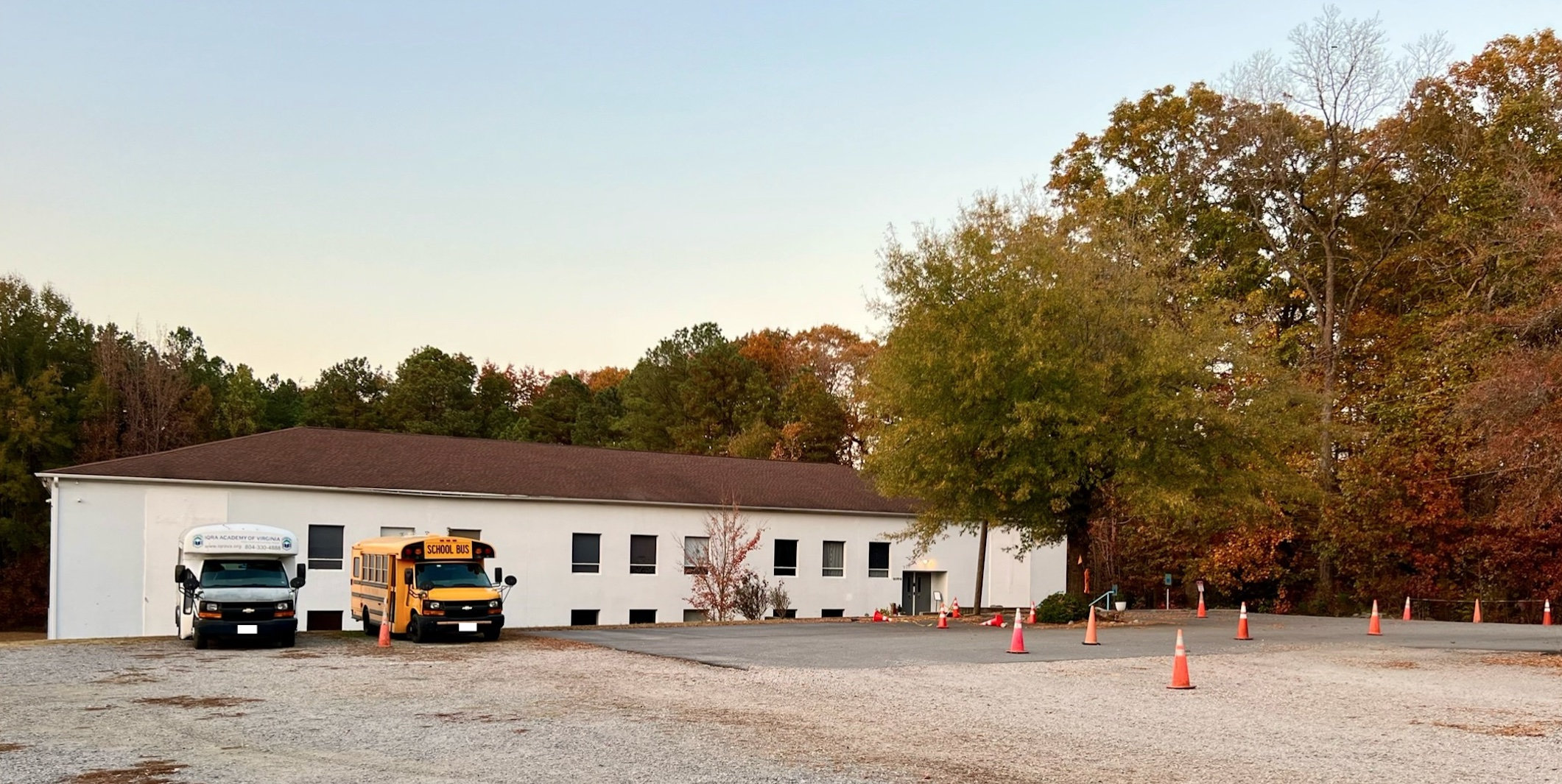

Location
- Midlothian, VA, Virginia
- Coordinates: 37.46293°N 77.59554°W

Information
- Type: Private
- Motto: Enriching Minds, Enlightening Hearts
- Opened: 1998
- Faculty: 30
- Grades: Pre-K - 12
- Enrollment: 123
- Campus size: 20 acres
- Website: almadinarichmond.org

Al Madina School of Richmond is a private school in Chesterfield County, Virginia, merged in 2016 from two schools in Richmond; Iqra Academy established in 1998 AND Tawheed Prep School established in 2007. It is the only dual accredited Islamic school in the Richmond area.

The school offers Pre-K 3/4, an enhanced curriculum through the twelfth grade, Qur'anic studies, Arabic as a foreign language, and Islamic studies. It offers the opportunity for an associate degree in a dual credit program at VCCS.
