= St. Vincent de Paul High School (Petersburg, Virginia) =

Location
- 240 Wagner Road; Petersburg, Virginia 23805; United States; 37°11′16″N 77°21′52″W

Information
- Former name: Bollingbrook School; Gibbons High School
- Type: Private parochial college-preparatory school
- Religious affiliation: Roman Catholic
- Patron saint: St. Vincent de Paul
- Established: 1985
- Status: Closed
- Closed: 2001
- Oversight: Roman Catholic Diocese of Richmond
- Grades: 7-12
- Enrollment: 112
- Campus size: 26 acres (11 ha)
- Team name: Saints
- Accreditation: Virginia Association of Independent Schools
- Yearbook: The Brook
- Feeder schools: St. Joseph School
- Website: www.saintsalumni.org

St. Vincent de Paul High School was a private, parochial high school in Petersburg, Virginia until 2001. Its campus was at 240 Wagner Road, which had been the campus of its predecessor, the Bollingbrook School.

== History ==
St. Vincent de Paul High School was formed in 1985 by the merger of the Roman Catholic Gibbons High School and Bollingbrook School, a non-denominational, non-profit college preparatory high school with a self-contained lower school.

Bollingbrook School was established as a segregation academy in 1958. The school's 26 acre campus was located in Prince George County until 1971 when the area was annexed by the City of Petersburg. It was accredited by the Virginia Association of Independent Schools.

The Diocese of Richmond closed St. Vincent de Paul High School in 2001 and the campus was purchased by neighboring Poplar Springs Hospital (previously Petersburg Psychiatric Institute) in 2001 for use as a behavioral center for students in grades 5-12.
