= Cardinal Gibbons High School =

Cardinal Gibbons High School may refer to:

- Cardinal Gibbons High School (Fort Lauderdale, Florida)
- Cardinal Gibbons High School (Raleigh, North Carolina)
- Cardinal Gibbons School (Baltimore, Maryland)
