= Georgia Independent School Association =

Georgia private school association

The Georgia Independent School Association (GISA) is an association of private, independent, and parochial schools throughout the state of Georgia.

The association provides coordination of and services for the various member schools, including athletics and academic competition, that are not a part of the Georgia High School Association. It further attempts to foster close relations between the member schools and the colleges and public schools in the State of Georgia. It has nearly 160 member schools.

== History ==
=== Predecessors ===
The Georgia Association of Independent Schools (GAIS) was founded in 1954 with eleven schools as charter members.

The Southeastern Association of Independent Schools (SEAIS) was founded in 1969 with twenty schools as charter members. Its formation came during a period when many segregation academies were being established to oppose integration and continue providing whites-only education.

In 1972, the GAIS adopted an open admissions policy which did not allow discrimination with regard to race, color, or national origin, and also required members to not belong to any association which also admits segregation academies. As a result, six schools were expelled for their failure to adopt the policy or for maintaining their membership in the SEAIS.

=== Merger to form the GISA ===
On July 1, 1986, the GAIS and SEAIS merged to form the GISA with 113 member schools. At the time of the merger, GAIS membership was 71 and SEAIS membership stood at 65.

During the 1990s and the early 2000s, GISA member-schools experienced a surge in student enrollment, with some sources citing an improved economy and worsening education outcomes in Georgia public schools. However, during the Great Recession, GISA member-schools saw an enrollment decline, as financial aid and endowments were restricted. Construction and capital projects were also paused or cancelled.

In 2021, GISA set up an ancillary organization, the Georgia Independent Athletic Association, to coordinate athletics for member schools. Since then, and following a dispute between the public and private schools in the Georgia High School Association (GHSA), over a dozen private schools have switched from the GHSA to the GISA.
