= Southland Academy =

Private day school in Georgia, US

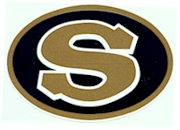

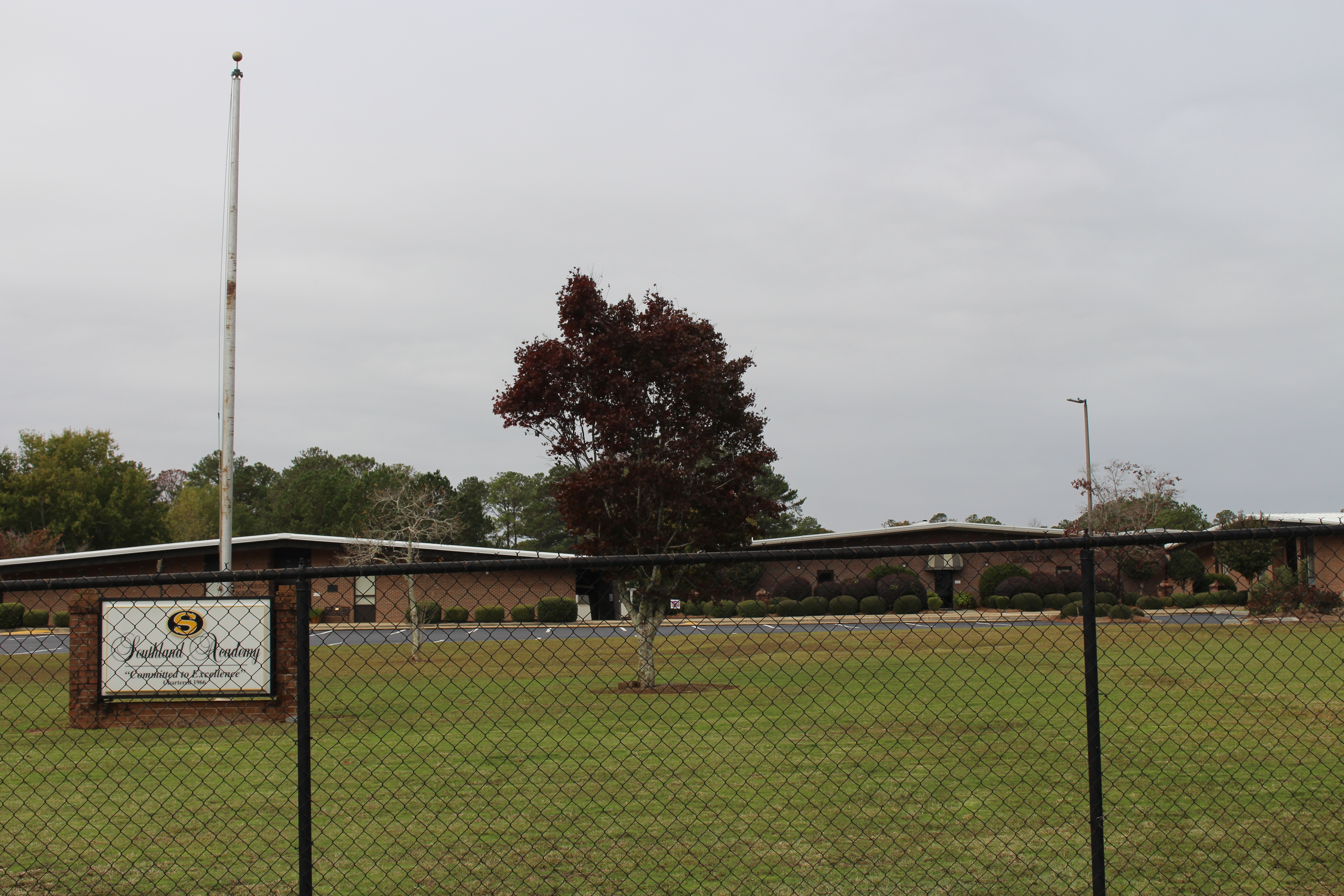

Location
- Americus, Georgia, United States; 32°04′25″N 84°11′39″W

Information
- Type: Private
- Established: 1966; 60 years ago
- NCES School ID: A0301268
- Head of school: Patty Webb
- Enrollment: 552
- Campus size: 55 acres (22 ha)
- Colors: Black, gold, and white
- Team name: Raiders
- Website: www.southlandacademy.org

Southland Academy is a private, co-educational, non-sectarian Christian college preparatory day school in Americus, Georgia, United States. It enrolls 552 students in kindergarten through twelfth grade. It was founded in 1966 as a segregation academy.

== History ==
Southland Academy was founded in 1966 as a private school in response to the desegregation of Georgia public schools. In 1979 the public school board (6 of 7 members of which sent their children to Southland) declared many of the district's buses, books and materials to be "surplus", then sold them to Southland at low prices. This caused financial hardships for the public schools, thereby promoting the academy. The first classes began in the old Anthony School building on Anthony Drive. In 1970, Southland moved to its current location at 123 Southland Road. It was reported in 1979 that most white parents in the area sent their children to Southland rather than the local public school system, which at the time was 80% black and the subject of boycotts and criticism over alleged neglect and underfunding. One businessman said he would "dig ditches" to earn money to pay tuition at Southland Academy and avoid sending his children to racially integrated public school.

As of the mid-1980s, the Sumter County School District board was all white. School superintendent Ronnie Satterfield and several other board members sent their children to Southland Academy instead of the predominantly black public schools. US president Jimmy Carter referred to the situation as a "disgrace to our state."

== Demographics ==
In 1985, Sumter County was 43% black, but not a single black student was enrolled in Southland Academy.

As of 2006, Southland Academy's student population was 1% African American, 1% Hispanic, 2% American Indian, and 96% Caucasian. In the 2015–16 school year, 3 of 510 students were black. In the 2017-2018 year, this number had not changed.

In 2020, the school had 452 students, of whom 444 or 98% were white, 4 or less than 1% were Black, and 4 or less than 1% were Hispanic. As of the 2020 census, the population of Americus was 27% White while Sumter County was 39% White.

== Accreditation ==
The school is accredited by Southern Association of Independent Schools, Southern Association of Colleges and Schools and the Georgia Accrediting Association, and is a member of the Georgia Independent Schools Association (GISA).

== Athletics ==
Southland Academy has an active athletic program in the GISA in the AAA region. Sports include football, baseball, softball, basketball, wrestling, cross-country running, track and field, golf, swimming, tennis, girls' soccer, and cheerleading. Male teams are called the Southland Raiders; female teams are the Lady Raiders. In 2016, the school added a clay target shooting team.

Class AAA GISA Championships:

Football: 1986-1987, 1991-1992, 1992-1993
Baseball: 1982-1983, 1989-1991, 1994-1995, 2003-2004
Golf: 1980-1988, 1991-1992, 1993-1995, 1997-1998, 2009
Boys' basketball: 1973-1974, 1975-1977, 1982-1983
Boys' cross country: 2013-2014, 2014-2015, 2015-2016
Boys' swimming: 1988-1989, 1991-1992, 1992-1993, 1993-1994, 1995-1996, 1997-1998, 2013-2014, 2014-2015, 2015-2016
Boys' tennis: 1980-1982, 1982-1984
Boys' track and field: 1975-1977, 1980-1984, 1991-1992
Softball: 1976-1977, 1999-2000, 2004-2005, 2006-2007
Girls' basketball: 1979-1980, 1985-1986
Girls' swimming: 1988-1989, 1989-1990, 1990-1991, 1991-1992, 1993-1994, 1994-1995
Girls' track: 1971-1972, 1975-1980, 1989-1990
Wrestling: 2001-2002

== Customs and discipline ==
A tradition at the school is the annual pageant at which the Miss Southland Academy Raider, better known as Miss SAR, is crowned. The pageant was started in 1989 by "Mothers of Motivated Students," now part of Southland's parent-teacher organization. Its purpose is to generate funds for the Thomas A. Greene Scholarship Fund, which helps Southland students in financial need. Funds also go to the new Madeline Anne Wildes Scholarship Fund.
