= Bayou Academy =

Location
- 1291 Crosby Road; Cleveland, Mississippi 38732; 33.762°N 90.763°W

Information
- Type: Segregation Academy
- Established: 1964
- Head of School: Will Reed
- Faculty: 30.5 (on FTE basis)
- Grades: Pre-Kindergarten to 12
- Enrollment: 350
- Student to teacher ratio: 7.1
- Colors: Royal Blue, and White
- Athletics conference: MAIS Div. AAA District 1
- Mascot: Colts
- Rivals: Lee Academy, Indianola Academy
- Accreditation: MAIS
- Affiliation: Non-sectarian
- Website: www.bayouacademy.net

Bayou Academy is a segregation academy located in unincorporated Bolivar County, Mississippi, near the City of Cleveland on Highway 8. The school serves about 500 students in grades Pre-Kindergarten through 12. The school is accredited by the Midsouth Association of Independent Schools.

== History ==
Bayou Academy was founded in 1964 as a segregation academy. In 1966, the all-white school board sold Skene Attendance Center to a white group called Skene Civic Improvement Society, Inc. for $1.00. The property was then leased to Bolivar Academy, achieving a transfer of public property to the segregationist group. After the United States Supreme Court decided Alexander v. Holmes County Board of Education in 1969, ordering the desegregation of public schools in the South, the all-white Bayou Academy doubled its enrollment for the 1970 school year. In 2009, the old Skene school building burned to the ground.

In 2021 the former elementary school principal was arrested for placing a camera in the girls locker room.

Of the 372 students who attended in the 2011–2012 school year, 99 percent were white.
