= Criser High School =

Criser School

Location
- Coordinates: 38.9076°N 78.1909°W

Information
- Other name: Ressie Jeffries Elementary (1966-)
- Opened: 1959
- Closed: 1966
- School district: Warren County, Virginia
- Principal: James W. McClendon
- Grades: 1–12

Criser High School was a predominantly African American school accommodating grades 1–12 constructed in 1959 in the town of Front Royal, Virginia. Its opening occurred the same year 22 African American students integrated the all-white Warren County High School, which drew national media attention.

== History ==
After the Stanley Plan, the legislative package implementing the massive resistance policies of Senator Harry F. Byrd, Sr., was found to be unconstitutional by federal courts, Criser High School was built to prevent total integration of Warren County High School. Its principal was James W. McClendon from Farmville, Va. McClendon previously taught agriculture at the R. R. Moton School in Prince Edward County, Va. The Prince Edward County, Board of Supervisors, refusing to integrate their school system voted not to appropriate any funds for the operation of all their schools. McClendon seeking employment elsewhere became aware of a new all-black High School being built in Warren County Virginia. He applied and was hired as its first and only principal. His wife Eunice was also hired as one of the school's elementary instructors.

Prior to the construction of Criser High School only grades 1 through 7 were available to black students of Warren County. Students that wanted to receive a high school education could attend Manassas Regional High School (Jennie Dean), located 40 miles (64 km) away from Front Royal. The students would leave Sunday and return Friday on transportation provided by the County.

After repeated requests from concerned parents regarding the distance and time spent from home by these young black students attending Manassas Regional, black students were allowed to attend Johnson-Williams High School in Berryville,28 miles (45 km) away. This arrangement allowed these students to return home the same day but much later than white students living in the county.

== Legacy ==
When the construction of Criser High School was completed, the school became the educational darling of the African American community. With a 15 acres (6.1 ha) campus overlooking Southtown, Criser High School provided education for African American students from the surrounding communities of Bentonville, Limeton, Guard Hill, Milldale, Bayard, Reliance, Riverton, Rockland and Happy Creek. With an initial student population of over 300, African American instructors from various historically black colleges were recruited to make up its corp of teachers. Some of the initial high school instructors came from the Prince Edward County school system.

Criser reached its zenith in the early 1960s and it was these formative years of the band that music instructor Geraldine Jackson established the foundation of its music legacy. Appearing on Ted Mack's nationally known The Original Amateur Hour, she showed her proficiency playing the baritone horn. Later, it was under the direction of music instructor John Easley, from Langston University, that the Black and Gold Lancers truly excelled and became marching band favorites of the Annual Apple Blossom Festival, Front Royal Christmas Parade, and the Hagerstown Halloween Parade. Frank Threatts of Richmond inaugurated and coached the school's sports program. In 1962, McKinley Armstrong significantly expanded the program and took it to new heights that included baseball along with track and field competition. Criser competed with other historically black Virginia high schools in a local district that included Frederick Douglass of Winchester, Johnson-Williams of Berryville, West Luray of Luray, and Lucy Simms of Harrisonburg. Beyond their district, their competition included Page-Jackson High School of Charles Town, Douglass High School of Leesburg, Frederick Douglass of Leesburg, William C. Taylor of Warrenton, George Washington Carver of Culpeper, Luther P. Jackson of Merrifield, Hoffman-Boston of Arlington, Booker T. Washington of Staunton, Central Augusta of Staunton, and Jennie Dean of Manassas. All of these schools have a rich history of community activism which brought about the creation of these historic African American institutions in the late 1940s and 1950s.

The consolidation of both Warren County and Rappahannock County school systems introduced African American students from Huntly, Flint Hill, Washington, and Sperryville to its school population, but the overall student enrollment continued to decline. The school closed its doors in 1966 due to further declining enrolment as a major exodus of students opted to attend Warren County High School in search of a purported better education, and to fulfil a driving need to satisfy the wishes of Front Royal's integrationist constituency.
