= Segregation academy =

Segregationist private schools in the US

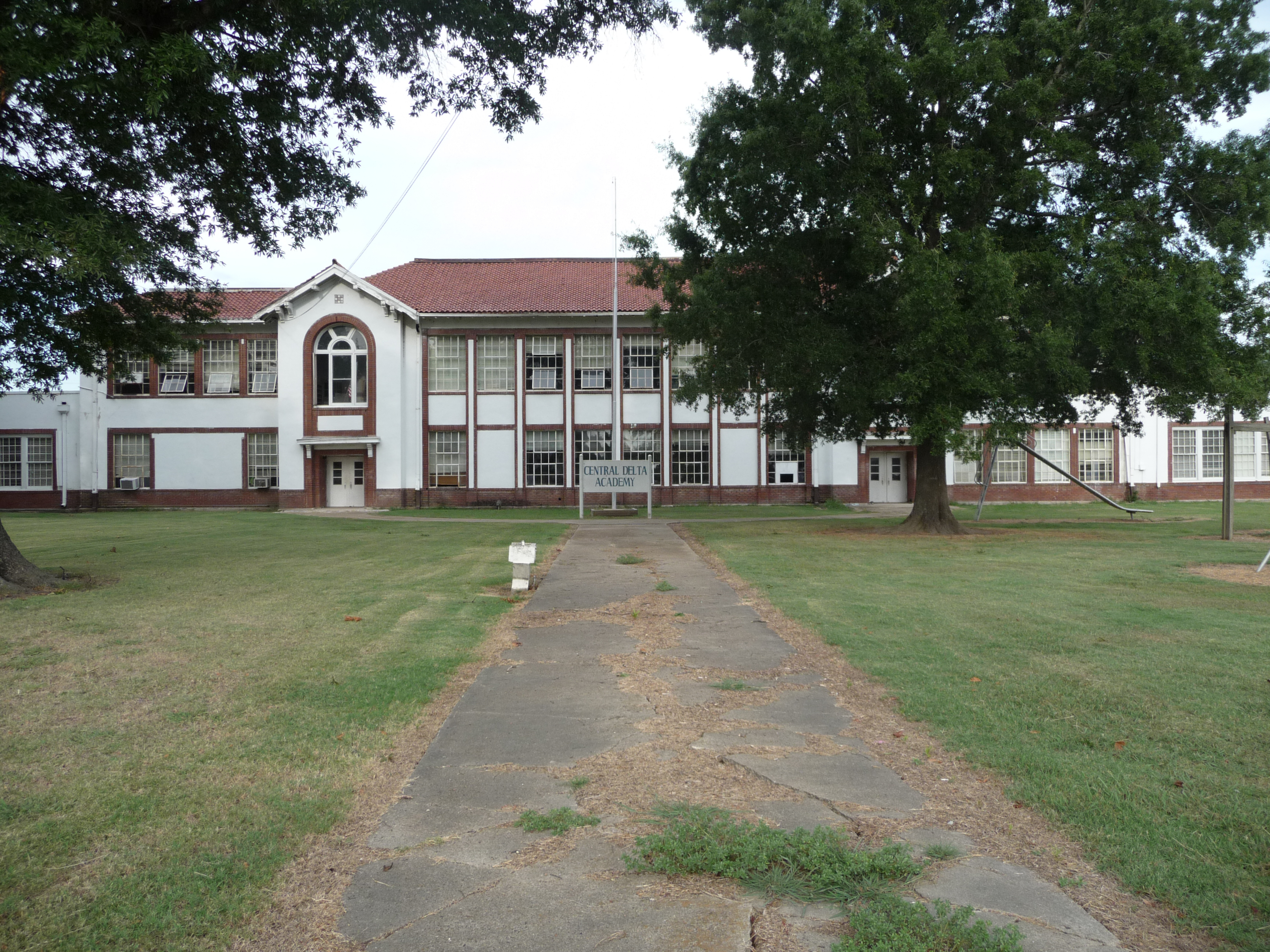
Central Delta Academy in Inverness, Mississippi, was a segregation academy.

Segregation academies are private schools in the Southern United States that were founded in the mid-20th century by white parents to avoid having their children attend integrated public schools. They were founded between 1954, when the U.S. Supreme Court ruled that segregated public schools were unconstitutional, and 1976, when the court ruled similarly about private schools.

While many of these schools still exist – most with low percentages of minority students even today – they may not legally discriminate against students or prospective students based on any considerations of religion, race or ethnicity that serve to exclude non-white students. The laws that permitted their racially-discriminatory operation, including government subsidies and tax exemption, were invalidated by U.S. Supreme Court decisions. After Runyon v. McCrary (1976), all of these private schools were forced to accept African-American students. As a result, segregation academies changed their admission policies, ceased operations, or merged with other private schools.

Most of these schools remain overwhelmingly white institutions, both because of their founding ethos and because tuition fees are a barrier to entry. In communities where many or most white students are sent to these private schools, the percentages of African-American students in tuition-free public schools are correspondingly elevated. For example, in Clarksdale, Mississippi, in 2010, 92% of the students at Lee Academy were white, while 92% of the students at Clarksdale High School were black. The effects of this de facto racial segregation are compounded by the unequal quality of education produced in communities where whites served by former segregation academies seek to minimize tax levies for public schools.

== History ==
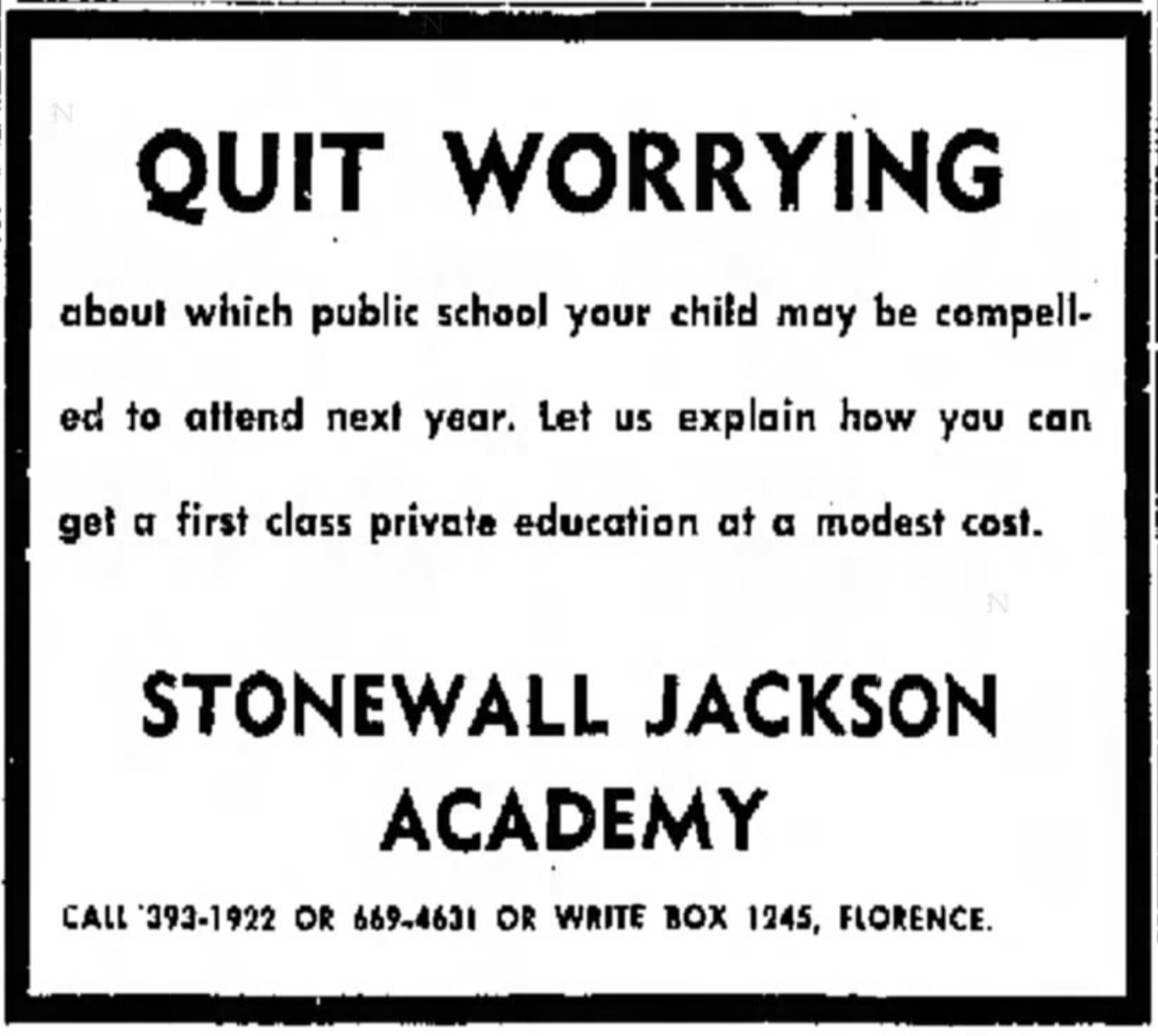
A 1970 advertisement for a segregation academy appealed to parents who were concerned about desegregation busing.

The first segregation academies were created by white parents in the late 1950s in response to the U.S. Supreme Court ruling in Brown v. Board of Education (1954), which required public school boards to eliminate segregation "with all deliberate speed" (Brown II). At the time, segregation under Jim Crow laws was still widely enforced in the South, where most adult blacks were still disfranchised and excluded from politics. The Brown ruling did not apply to private schools, so founding new academies gave white parents a way to continue to educate their children separately from blacks. In Virginia, the "massive resistance" campaign led Prince Edward County to close its public schools from 1959 to 1964; the only education in the county was a segregation academy, funded by state "tuition grants".

From 1950 to 1958, the South's private school enrollment increased by more than 250,000 students; by 1965, nearly one million Southern students attended private schools. "This growth was catalyzed by Southern state legislatures, who enacted as many as 450 laws and resolutions between 1954 and 1964 attempting to block, postpone, limit, or evade the desegregation of public schools, many of which expressly authorized the systematic transfer of public assets and monies to private schools...While none of the new laws specifically mentioned 'race' or racial segregation, each had the effect of obstructing Black students from attending all-White public schools."

The underwriting of private schools undermined public schools. "What is notable is that taxpayer dollars financed these all-white schools at the cost of simultaneously creating poorly funded all-black public-school systems in the South. To put it simply, as the financial drain of taxpayer dollars from whites attending segregation academies decimated school systems educating black children, black communities, students and teachers paid a terribly high price to ensure that whites were educated with other whites," segregation researcher Noliwe Rooks wrote in 2018.

A 1972 report on school desegregation noted that segregation academies could usually be identified by the word "Christian" or "church" in the school's name. The report observed that while individual Protestant churches were often deeply involved in the establishment of segregation academies, Catholic dioceses often indicated that their schools were not meant to be havens from desegregation, which was buttressed by the reputation Catholic schools had in offering free or reduced tuition to children of color in order to afford them a parochial education. Many segregation academies claimed they were established to provide a "Christian education", but the sociologist Jennifer Dyer has argued that such claims were simply a "guise" for the schools' actual objective of allowing parents to avoid enrolling their children in racially integrated public schools.

Reasons why whites pulled their children out of public schools have been debated: whites insisted that "quality fueled their exodus", and blacks said "white parents refused to allow their children to be schooled alongside blacks". Scholars estimate that, across the nation, at least half a million white students were withdrawn from public schools between 1964 and 1975 to avoid mandatory desegregation. In the 21st century, Archie Douglas, the headmaster of Montgomery Academy (founded as a segregation academy), said that he is sure "that those who resented the Civil Rights Movement or sought to get away from it took refuge in the academy". As of 2014, the student body of The Montgomery Academy was 10% percent non-white.

=== IRS involvement and definitions ===
In 1969, parents of Mississippi black children brought suit to revoke tax-exemption status for non-profit segregation academies (Green v. Connally). They won a temporary injunction in the D.C. Circuit in early 1970 and the suit in June 1971. The United States government appealed to the Supreme Court, where the lower court's decision was summarily affirmed in Coit v. Green (1971). Meanwhile, on July 10, 1970, the Internal Revenue Service announced it could "no longer legally justify allowing tax-exempt status to private schools which practice racial discrimination". For a school to get or keep its tax-exempt status, it would have to publish a policy of non-discrimination and not practice overt discrimination. Many schools simply refused to comply. In the 1980s, Southern Republican Members of Congress, such as Trent Lott and Strom Thurmond, began to pressure the Reagan administration to halt revocation of tax-exempt status from segregation academies. In 1982, during congressional debate on the Voting Rights Act Amendments of 1982, the administration considered support for such a policy, leading to what one of its aides called "our worst public-relations and political disaster yet".

A decade later, similarly aggrieved appellees argued once again in Allen v. Wright (1983) that the standards were too low. The appellees had asserted that "there are more than 3,500 racially segregated private academies operating in the country having a total enrollment of more than 750,000 children." The court considered whether the parents had standing to sue, and concluded not, because they did not allege that they or their children had applied to, been discouraged from applying to, or been denied admission to any private school or schools. Specifically, it ruled that citizens do not have standing to sue a federal government agency based on the influence that the agency's determinations might have on third parties (such as private schools). The judges noted the parents were in the posture of disappointed observers of the governmental process. The IRS would continue to enforce the regulations it had promulgated in 1970. Any school that was not tax-exempt in this period was likely a segregation academy, the standard for non-discrimination being low. Not many of the 3,500 appear in lists, if there were 3,500. After 1983, any school named in a judgement or IRS document in this period absolutely was. Many schools did not regain tax-exempt status until the 1990s.

== By state ==
Virginia was the first state to respond to Brown by establishing and funding segregation academies. By 1970, four other states—Alabama, Georgia, Mississippi, and South Carolina—had defied the court's decision in Brown. Between 1961 and 1971, non-Catholic Christian schools doubled their enrollments nationally. By 1969, 300,000 of 7,400,000 white students attended segregated school in eleven southern states. Segregated private schools lost their tax-exempt status in Coit v. Green (1971). Virginia was also the first to be told in federal court that segregation academies were unconstitutional (Runyon v. McCrary (1976)), leading to their decline.

=== Virginia ===
In Virginia, segregation academies were part of a policy of massive resistance declared by U.S. Senator Harry F. Byrd, Sr. He worked to unite other white Virginia politicians and leaders in taking action to prevent school desegregation after the Brown v. Board of Education Supreme Court ruling in 1954.

In its September/October 1956 special session, the Virginia General Assembly passed a series of laws known as the Stanley Plan to implement massive resistance. In January, Virginia's voters had approved an amendment to the state constitution to allow tuition grants to parents enrolling their children in private schools. Part of the Stanley Plan established tuition grants program, which allowed parents who refused to allow their children to attend desegregated schools funding so each could attend a private school of choice. In practice, this meant state support of newly established all-white private schools which became known as "segregation academies".

On February 18, 1958, the General Assembly passed (and Governor Almond signed) additional legislation protecting segregation, what the Byrd Organization called the "Little Rock Bill" (responding to President Eisenhower's use of federal powers to assist the court-ordered desegregation of schools in Little Rock, Arkansas). Since new segregation academy facilities often failed to meet construction, health and safety standards for public schools, these were also loosened.

Segregation academies opened in various Virginia cities and counties subject to desegregation lawsuits, including Arlington, Charlottesville and Norfolk where Governor Almond had ordered the schools closed rather than comply with federal court orders to desegregate. Arlington and Norfolk desegregated peacefully in February 1959. In Arlington, many (if not most) white students remained in the desegregated schools. However, that was not the case in Norfolk and other areas, such as Richmond, where whites largely abandoned the public schools for segregation academies and other private schools, home schooling, or moved to predominately white suburbs outside the city limits. Today [when?], more than a half-century after school desegregation, largely due to white flight, the Richmond City and Norfolk Public Schools are the school divisions with the most racially and economically isolated schools in Virginia.

Segregation academies in Warren and Prince Edward counties and the city of Norfolk are discussed below, as examples of why even in the fall of 1963, only 3,700 black pupils or 1.6% attended school with whites. NAACP litigation had resulted in some desegregation by the fall of 1960 in eleven localities, and the number of at least partially desegregated districts had slowly risen to 20 in the fall of 1961, 29 in the fall of 1962, and 55 (out of 130 school districts) in 1963.

Warren County also planned to integrate its only high school, Warren County High School, but Governor Almond closed the school (along with schools in Charlottesville and Norfolk) in the fall of 1958. Education continued in private and church facilities for that school year. By the fall of 1959, the John S. Mosby Academy (1-12) was constructed and opened as an all-white school. A public high school for black students was built and opened (Criser High School), and Warren County High School reopened with a significantly reduced white student population and 22 black students. Criser operated until 1966, and Mosby operated through the 1968–69 school year.

When faced with an order to integrate, Prince Edward County closed its entire school system in September 1959, and kept county schools closed until 1964, as it kept litigating (although Davis v. County School Board of Prince Edward County had been a companion case to Brown). The newly founded private Prince Edward Academy operated as the de facto school system for white students. It enrolled K-12 students at several facilities throughout the county. Many black students were forced to move in with relatives in other counties, attend makeshift schools in church basements, or move to northern states to live with host families through a program of the Society of Friends in order to gain education. Even after public schools re-opened, Prince Edward Academy remained segregated as discussed below.

In Norfolk, churches and other organizations offered classes, teachers from the shuttered public schools formed tutorial groups, and classes were also held in private homes. The Norfolk Division of the College of William & Mary (now Old Dominion University) provided classes for some high school students. Other students from Norfolk attended schools in the neighboring cities of Hampton, Chesapeake, Virginia Beach and Portsmouth. Some parents sent their children to live with relatives in other parts of Virginia or in other states. The Defenders of State Sovereignty and Individual Liberties founded the Tidewater Educational Foundation to create a private school for white students in Norfolk. The Tidewater Academy opened as a segregation academy on October 22, 1958, with 250 white students with classes meeting in local churches.

Although on January 19, 1959, the Virginia Supreme Court of Appeals struck down the new Virginia law that closed schools before integration, as contrary to a public schooling provision in the state constitution (and a three-judge federal panel struck down other provisions of the Stanley Plan on the same day, (the Virginia state holiday honoring Robert E. Lee and Stonewall Jackson), individual state tuition grants to parents continued, allowing them to patronize segregation academies.

In 1964, the Supreme Court of the United States ruled in Griffin v. County School Board of Prince Edward County that Virginia's tuition grants where the public schools had been closed for reasons of race (such as in Prince Edward County) violated the U.S. Constitution. This decision finally effectively ended massive resistance within state governments, and dealt some segregation academies a fatal blow. Later rulings put the academies' tax exemption status in jeopardy if they practiced racial discrimination.

In 1978, Prince Edward Academy lost its tax exempt status. In 1986, it changed its admission policy to allow black students to attend but few black students can afford the tuition to attend the school, which today is known as the Fuqua School. All other Virginia segregation academies have either closed, adopted non-racial discrimination policies, or merged with other schools that already had non-discrimination policies in place. Because the Catholic Church had desegregated its schools before Brown, the Huguenot Academy (a segregation academy implicitly disavowing that Catholic policy by its title), merged with Blessed Sacrament High School, a nearby Catholic high school, to become Blessed Sacrament-Huguenot. In 1985 the Bollingbrook School, another private school originally founded as a segregation academy for white students in 1958, merged with a nearby Catholic high school in Petersburg, Gibbons High School, to become St. Vincent de Paul High School.

Most segregation academies founded in Virginia during "Massive Resistance" are still thriving more than a half century later and some like Hampton Roads Academy, the Fuqua School, Nansemond-Suffolk Academy and Isle of Wight Academy continue to expand in the 21st century. Enrollment at Isle of Wight Academy now stands at approximately 650 students, the most ever enrolled at the school. In 2016 Nansemond Suffolk Academy opened a second campus, that includes an additional 22,000 square foot building for students in pre-kindergarten through grade 3. All of these schools had officially adopted non-discrimination policies and begun admitting non-white students by the end of the 1980s and like other private schools, are now eligible for federal education money through what are known as Title programs that flow through public school districts. However, few blacks can afford the high cost of tuition to send their children to these private schools. In some cases, their association with "old money" and past discrimination still cause some tension in the community, especially among non-whites and students of the local public schools. These racist histories may cause black parents who can afford the tuition to be reluctant to enroll their children in these schools.

The abandonment of public schools by most whites in Virginia's rural counties that lie within the Black Belt and white flight from inner cities to suburbs after the failure of "Massive Resistance" has ultimately led to increasingly racially and economically isolated public schools in Virginia. As of 2016 there were 74,515 students in these isolated schools, including 17 percent of all black students in Virginia's public schools and 8 percent of all Hispanic students. Many of these schools are inner city schools located in Richmond, Norfolk, Petersburg, Roanoke, and Newport News. By contrast, less than 1 percent of Virginia's non-Hispanic white students attended these isolated schools.

=== Mississippi ===
In Mississippi, many of the segregation academies were first established in the black-majority Mississippi Delta region in northwestern Mississippi. The Delta has historically had a very large majority-black population, related to the history of the use of slave labor on cotton plantations. The potential for integration resulted in white parents' establishing segregation academies in every county in the Delta. Many academies are still operating, from Indianola, Mississippi, to Humphreys County. These schools began to accept black students later in the 20th century, although many of them still enroll relatively small numbers of black students. In a region with low incomes among blacks, many African-American parents cannot afford the private schools. At least one school in Mississippi, Carroll Academy, receives substantial funding from the segregationist Council of Conservative Citizens. Mississippi Governor Ross Barnett said in September 1962, "I submit to you tonight, no school will be integrated in Mississippi while I am your governor".

=== Arkansas ===
Between 1966 and 1972, at least 32 segregation academies were established in Arkansas. By 1972, about 5,000 white students attended such schools.

Arkansas is one of twelve states that have not adopted the Blaine Amendment to their state constitutions. The amendment forbids direct government aid to educational institutions that have a religious affiliation. Many segregation academies have since adopted curricula with a "Christian world view".

=== Louisiana ===
The United States District Court for the Eastern District of Louisiana mandated integration of public schools in Washington Parish (1969) and St. Tammany Parish (1969), and the United States District Court for the Western District of Louisiana did so for Tensas Parish (1970), Claiborne Parish (1970), and Jackson Parish (1969).

=== Alabama ===
Alabama, like Mississippi, largely ignored the 1954 ruling of Brown v. Board of Education. In 1958, a conflict over segregation in city parks brought Martin Luther King Jr. to Montgomery. The city closed its parks; King recommended that black parents attempt to enroll their children in city schools, expecting to establish cases testing the Alabama Pupil Placement Act. Montgomery Academy was the first segregation academy established in Alabama; others followed in the late 1960s.

=== North Carolina ===
Following the Brown v. Board of Education decision in 1954, Governor William B. Umstead established a committee to consider the effects of complying the U.S. Supreme Court's ruling. The bi-racial committee made up of blacks and whites reported to the General Assembly that desegregation "throughout the state cannot be accomplished and should not be attempted". Luther Hodges became governor in 1955, and although opposed to integration, he formed a new committee to study the issue, because the Court had ruled that school desegregation must happen "with all deliberate speed". When it became clear that the federal government was not going to force the issue, the state began to look for ways to circumvent the Supreme Court, using legal means, while avoiding the outright defiance of court orders that was taking place in Virginia where the legislature had adopted a policy of massive resistance.

This committee established the Pearsall Plan, named after its chairman, Thomas J. Pearsall of Rocky Mount. In 1956 the Pearsall Plan established a system of local control, freedom of choice, and school vouchers. The Pearsall Plan also gave school districts the option of shutting down schools by public referendum if they were faced with a desegregation order. The freedom-of-choice system allowed students to attend the school their parents wanted them to attend, and the voucher system allowed parents to use state money to support their child's education in a private school. As in other southern states a number of private segregation academies were founded.

In 2019 the North Carolina State Board of Education voted unanimously to approve the conversion of Halifax County's private Hobgood Academy, founded in 1969 as a segregation academy, to a public charter school. Hobgood's student population is 88 percent white, while only 4 percent of those attending the Halifax County public Schools are white. This had led to concerns by some teachers that while charter schools in some states have helped low-income students improve academically, in North Carolina they have primarily been used as a means for whites to opt out of traditional public schools.

=== South Carolina ===
In South Carolina, where private schools have existed since the 1800s, there were no fully racially integrated private schools before 1954. Some 200 private schools were created between 1963 and 1975; private school enrollment hit a peak of 50,000 in 1978. In Clarendon County, for example, the private academy Clarendon Hall was established in late 1965, after four black students enrolled in a previously all-white public school in the fall term. By 1969, only 281 white students were left in the public school system, and only 16 white students were in public schools when they officially desegregated a year later.

=== Texas ===
Texas was an early opponent of desegregation. In 1956, blacks were turned away from Mansfield High School in defiance of Brown and other federal orders to integrate. In Dallas, for example, the Dallas Independent School District subdivided itself into six subdistricts, each of which was "one race" (more than ninety percent white or black). The Texas Education Agency was ordered in November 1970 to desegregate Texas public schools (United States v. Texas). The state did not offer any financial assistance to private schools as Virginia, Mississippi, and Alabama had.

== List of schools founded as segregation academies ==
A partial list of segregation academies includes the following: (Note: This list is incomplete. Reliable sources are required for inclusion. Closed segregation academies, especially, may not have sufficient references to support inclusion. See also Category:Segregation academies)

School	State	Est.	Ref.
Abbeville Christian Academy	Alabama	1970	
Autauga Academy	Alabama	1969	
Bessemer Academy	Alabama	1969	
Central Alabama Academy	Alabama	1970	
Chambers Academy	Alabama	1969	
Clarke Preparatory School	Alabama	1970	
Coosa Valley Academy	Alabama	1972	
Dixie Academy	Alabama	1967	
Edgewood Academy	Alabama	1967	
Escambia Academy	Alabama	1970	
Eclectic Academy	Alabama	1972	
Grove Hill Academy	Alabama	1970	
Houston Academy	Alabama	1970	
Fort Dale Academy	Alabama	1969	
Inglenook Academy	Alabama	1970	
John T. Morgan Academy	Alabama	1965	
Lowndes Academy	Alabama	1966	
Macon East Academy	Alabama	1963	
Monroe Academy	Alabama	1969	
Montgomery Academy	Alabama	1959	
Pickens Academy	Alabama	1969	
Saint James School	Alabama	1955	
South Choctaw Academy	Alabama	1969	
Springwood School	Alabama	1970	
Sumter Academy	Alabama	1970 closed 2017	
Trinity Presbyterian School	Alabama	1970	
Tuscaloosa Academy	Alabama	1967	
Wilcox Academy	Alabama	1970	
Bellaire Academy	Arkansas	1970	
Central Arkansas Christian School	Arkansas	1970	
Central Baptist Academy	Arkansas	1970	
Edgewood Academy	Arkansas	1970	
England Academy	Arkansas	1970	
Hughes Academy	Arkansas	1971	
Jefferson Preparatory Academy	Arkansas	1971	
Marvell Academy	Arkansas	1966	
Montrose Academy	Arkansas	1970	
Pulaski Academy	Arkansas	1971	
Southeast Academy	Arkansas	1970	
Tabernacle Baptist Academy	Arkansas	1970	
Watson Chapel Academy	Arkansas	1971	
West Memphis Christian School	Arkansas	1970	
Bayshore Christian School	Florida	1971	
Dade Christian School	Florida	1961	
Glades Day School	Florida	1965	
Lake Highland Preparatory School	Florida	1970	
Maclay School	Florida	1968	
Oak Hall School	Florida	1970	
Robert F. Munroe Day School	Florida	1969	
Rolling Green Academy	Florida	1970	
North Florida Christian School	Florida	1968	
Tallavana Christian School	Florida	1971	
University Christian School	Florida	1970	
Bulloch Academy	Georgia	1971	
Deerfield-Windsor School	Georgia	1969	
Briarwood Academy	Georgia	1970	
First Presbyterian Day School	Georgia	1970	97
Flint River Academy	Georgia	1967	
George Walton Academy	Georgia	1969	
Gordon Ivey Independent High School	Georgia	1970	
John Hancock Academy	Georgia	1966	
Nathanael Greene Academy	Georgia	1969	
Pinewood Christian Academy	Georgia	1970	
Southland Academy	Georgia	1967	
Southwest Georgia Academy	Georgia	1970	
Stratford Academy	Georgia	1960	
Tattnall Square Academy	Georgia	1969	
The Westfield School	Georgia	1970	
Valwood School	Georgia	1969	
Bowling Green School	Louisiana	1970	
Briarfield Academy	Louisiana	1970	
Caddo Community School	Louisiana	1969	
Central Private School	Louisiana	1971	
Claiborne Academy	Louisiana	1969	
False River Academy	Louisiana	1969	
Glenbrook School	Louisiana	1966	
Grawood Christian School	Louisiana	1966	
Guy Beuche	Louisiana	1969	
LeJeune Academy	Louisiana	1969	
Livonia Academy	Louisiana	1969	
River Oaks School	Louisiana	1969	
Old River Academy	Louisiana	1969	
West End Academy	Louisiana	1969	
Prytania Private School	Louisiana	1960	
Tenth Ward Private School	Louisiana	1969	
Adams County Christian School	Mississippi	1964	
Amite Center School	Mississippi	1968	
Bayou Academy	Mississippi	1964	
Benton Academy	Mississippi	1969	
Brandon Academy	Mississippi	1968 closed 1989	
Brookhaven Academy	Mississippi	1970	
Calhoun Academy	Mississippi	1968	
Canton Academy	Mississippi	1965	
Carroll Academy	Mississippi	1969	
Central Academy	Mississippi	1969 closed 2017	
Central Delta Academy	Mississippi	c 1969 closed 2010	
Centreville Academy	Mississippi	1967	
Central Holmes Academy	Mississippi	1967	
Copiah Academy	Mississippi	1967	
Cruger-Tchula Academy	Mississippi	1965	
Council Manhattan High School	Mississippi	1966	
Deer Creek Academy	Mississippi	1970	
Delta Academy	Mississippi	1964	
East Holmes Academy	Mississippi	1964; Closed 2006	
East Rankin Academy	Mississippi	1970	
Greenville Christian School	Mississippi	1969	
Hillcrest Christian School	Mississippi	1965	
Indianola Academy	Mississippi	1965	
Heidelberg Academy	Mississippi	1970	
Heritage Academy	Mississippi	1964	
Humphreys Academy	Mississippi	1968	
Jackson Academy	Mississippi	1959	
Jackson Preparatory School	Mississippi	1970	
Jefferson Davis Academy	Mississippi	1969	
Kirk Academy	Mississippi	1966	
Lamar School	Mississippi	1964	
Lawrence County Academy	Mississippi	1970	
Lee Academy	Mississippi	1970	
Leake Academy	Mississippi	1970	
Leland Academy	Mississippi	1969	
Madison-Ridgeland Academy	Mississippi	1969	
Magnolia Heights	Mississippi	1970	
Manchester Academy	Mississippi	1969	
Marshall Academy	Mississippi	1968	
McCluer Academy	Mississippi	1970	
Northpoint Christian School	Mississippi	1973	
North Sunflower Academy	Mississippi	1969	
Oak Hill Academy (Mississippi)	Mississippi	1966	
Parklane Academy	Mississippi	1970	
Pillow Academy	Mississippi	1966	
Sharkey-Issaquena Academy	Mississippi	1970	
St. George's Episcopal Day School	Mississippi		
Starkville Academy	Mississippi	1969	
Strider Academy	Mississippi	1971 closed 2018	
Tri-County Academy	Mississippi	1970	
Tunica Institute of Learning	Mississippi	1964	
Walthall Academy	Mississippi	1969	
Washington School	Mississippi	1969	
Wilkinson County Christian Academy	Mississippi	1969	
Winona Christian School	Mississippi	1970	
Winston Academy	Mississippi	1969	
Woodland Hills Academy	Mississippi	1970 closed	
Arendell Parrott Academy	North Carolina	1964	
Cape Fear Academy	North Carolina	1968	
Forsyth Country Day School	North Carolina	1970	
Lawrence Academy	North Carolina	1968	
Northside Christian Academy	North Carolina	1961	
Providence Day School	North Carolina	1970	
Rocky Mount Academy	North Carolina	1968	
Wake Christian Academy	North Carolina	1966	
Christian Heritage Academy	Oklahoma	1972	
Bowman Academy	South Carolina	1966	
Clarendon Hall Academy	South Carolina	1965	
Calhoun Academy	South Carolina	1969	
Hilton Head Preparatory School	South Carolina	1985	
Jefferson Davis Academy	South Carolina	1965	
John C. Calhoun Academy	South Carolina	1966	
Hammond School	South Carolina	1966	
Patrick Henry Academy	South Carolina	1965	
Thomas Heyward Academy	South Carolina	1970	
Richard Winn Academy	South Carolina	1966	
Roy Hudgens Academy	South Carolina	1966	
Sea Island Academy	South Carolina	1970	
Wade Hampton Academy	South Carolina	1964	
Wilson Hall	South Carolina	1967	
Willington Academy	South Carolina	1970	
Coastal Academy	South Carolina	1970	
Stonewall Jackson Academy (Orangeburg)	South Carolina	1965	
Williamsburg Academy	South Carolina	1970	
Lee Academy	South Carolina	1965	
Marlboro Academy	South Carolina	1969	
Brentwood Academy	Tennessee	1969	
Briarcrest Baptist High School	Tennessee	1973	
Evangelical Christian School	Tennessee	1965	
Franklin Road Academy	Tennessee	1971	
Harding Academy (Nashville)	Tennessee	1971	
Lakehill Preparatory School	Texas	1971	
Northwest Academy	Texas	1970	
Trinity Christian Academy	Texas	1970	
Amelia Academy	Virginia	1964	
Bobbe's School	Virginia	1958	
Bollingbrook School	Virginia	1958	
Broadwater Academy	Virginia	1966	
Brunswick Academy	Virginia	1964	
Fairfax-Brewster School	Virginia	1955	
Prince Edward Academy	Virginia	1959	
Hampton Roads Academy	Virginia	1959	
Huguenot Academy	Virginia	1959	
Isle of Wight Academy	Virginia	1967	
Jamestown Academy	Virginia	1964	
John S. Mosby Academy	Virginia	1959	
Lynchburg Christian Academy	Virginia	1967	
Nansemond-Suffolk Academy	Virginia	1966	
Robert E. Lee Academy	Virginia	1959	
Rock Hill Academy	Virginia	1959	
Southampton Academy	Virginia	1969	
Tidewater Academy (Wakefield)	Virginia	1964	
Tidewater Academy (Norfolk)	Virginia	1958	
Tomahawk Academy	Virginia	1964	
Surry Academy	Virginia	1963	
Pensacola Christian Academy	Florida	1954	
York Academy	Virginia	1965	

== In federal law ==
Green v. Connally (1971) set the standard by which the Internal Revenue Service identifies a segregation academy, a so-called "Paragraph (1) School". The IRS must deny exemption to schools:

which have been determined in adversary or administrative proceedings to be racially discriminatory; or were established or expanded at or about the time the public school districts in which they are located or which they serve were desegregating, and which cannot demonstrate that they do not racially discriminate in admissions, employment, scholarships, loan programs, athletics, and extracurricular programs.

== See also ==
- The "Southern Manifesto", a document written in 1956 by legislators in the United States Congress opposed to racial integration in public places
- Runyon v. McCrary (1976): U.S. Supreme Court affirms private schools may not discriminate due to race based on 42 U.S.C. 1981.
- Allen v. Wright, a 1984 U. S. Supreme Court case challenging public subsidy for private schools that are effectively segregated.
