= Midsouth Association of Independent Schools =

The Midsouth Association of Independent Schools (MAIS) is a consortium of schools in Mississippi, Tennessee, Louisiana and Arkansas. It is responsible for accreditation of its member private schools as well as governing athletic competition for its member schools. It was founded in 1968 by a group of segregation academies.

The association also operates two other organizations, the Mississippi Association of Independent Schools Educational Association and the Mississippi Association of Independent Schools Coaches Association.

== History ==
Then named the Mississippi Private School Association, it was founded in 1968 as an accrediting agency for segregation academies. Many of those schools no longer exist, while others have minorities enrolled and are accredited by other bodies such as the Southern Association of Colleges and Schools.

1987 marked the first time a Black student played on any MPSA boys' sports team, and in 2000 Christ Missionary and Industrial College High School became the first Black school to be granted membership. The first MPSA sanctioned football game involving an all-black school took place in 2000.

In July 2009, the organization changed its name to the Mississippi Association of Independent Schools, and in 2019 changed it again to the Midsouth Association of Independent Schools to reflect the inclusion of schools in Arkansas, Alabama, Louisiana, and Tennessee. In 1992, the Louisiana Independent School Association, also created by segregation academies, merged into the MPSA.

== Citizens' Council connections ==
Historian Joseph Crespino has stated that members of the White Citizens' Council "doubtless" played a role in the founding of the Association. Sociologist Kenneth Andrews says that the MPSA built "on the earlier foundation of the Citizens' Council and the Council School Foundation."

== Classification ==
The MAIS, until 2019, divided its schools into five classifications, in which Academy AAAA represented the largest of the private schools, while the 8-man league represented the smallest schools. In 2019, after several smaller schools dropped down to 8-man football, the MAIS moved to six classifications.

For the sport of football, as of the 2023-25 reclassification period, Class 6A would consist of a single district of the six largest private schools in the MAIS: Jackson Prep, Jackson Academy, Madison-Ridgeland Academy, St. Joseph Catholic School (Madison, Mississippi), Hartfield Academy, and Presbyterian Christian School. The other 46 schools that support 11-man football were then divided as thus: the top third would be Class 5A, the middle third as Class 4A, and the remaining 11-man football schools would be Class 3A. The 8-man schools, 31 in number, were then divided into Class 2A (the top half of the 8-man schools) and Class 1A (the bottom half of the 8-man schools). The championship site for the 1A thru 5A football title games is usually at Jackson Academy. The 6A championship game is usually held at Mississippi College.

In most non-football playing sports, the MAIS is organized into five classifications. Class 6A, like football, is represented by the six largest schools in the organization. Classes 5A, 4A, 3A, and 2A (the smallest classification for non-football sports in the MAIS) would get 24 schools apiece. For sports such as soccer and volleyball in which not as many schools support the sport, they are divided into divisions instead.
