= Dundee, Mississippi =

- Census-designated place
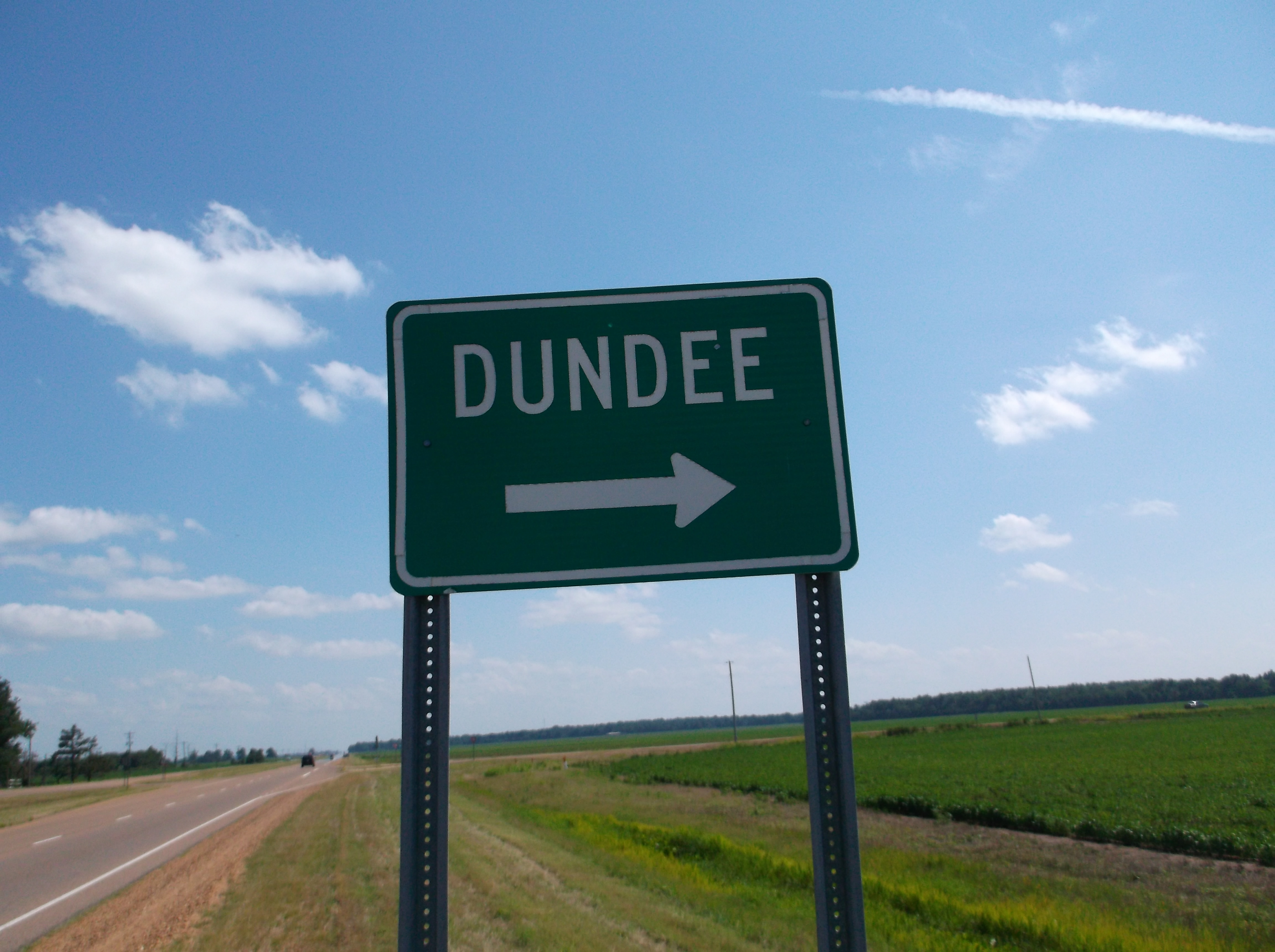
- Highway sign in Dundee

- Location within Mississippi Location within the United States
- Coordinates: 34°31′37″N 90°27′12″W
- Country: United States
- State: Mississippi
- County: Tunica

Area
  - Total: 2.02 sq mi (5.23 km^{2})
  - Land: 2.01 sq mi (5.20 km^{2})
  - Water: 0.012 sq mi (0.03 km^{2})
- Elevation: 184 ft (56 m)

Population (2020)
  - Total: 73
  - Density: 36.3/sq mi (14.03/km^{2})
- Time zone: UTC-6 (Central (CST))
  - Summer (DST): UTC-5 (CDT)
- ZIP code: 38626
- Area code: 662
- GNIS feature ID: 2812746

Dundee is a census-designated place (CDP) and unincorporated community in Tunica County, Mississippi, United States. Dundee is 12 miles (19 km) south-southwest of Tunica. Dundee has a post office with ZIP code 38626.

Per the 2020 Census, the population was 73.

== History ==
The village was founded in 1884 after the Louisville, New Orleans and Texas Railway was built, and was originally called Carnesville, for Captain J.B. Carnes, a principal landowner in the county.

A post office was established in 1887, though a similarly-named Carnesville required a change of names. "Dundee" was selected from a list. Dundee was incorporated in 1920 by Gubernatorial (Governor's) Proclamation.

Dundee served as a transportation hub, and a railroad depot was built circa 1895. Blues musician W. C. Handy once played on the depot's wooden platform as crowds danced. In 2011, the depot—the last in Tunica County—was moved to Robinsonville, where it was restored and made into a visitors center. The "Highway 61 North" Mississippi Blues Trail marker is located in front of the depot.

== Education ==
Residents are a part of the Tunica County School District. Zoned schools include Dundee Elementary School, Tunica Middle School, and Rosa Fort High School.

== Demographics ==
Historical population
Census	Pop.	Note	%±
2020	73		—
U.S. Decennial Census; 2020

Dundee was first listed as a census designated place in the 2020 U.S. census.

=== 2020 census ===
Dundee CDP, Mississippi – Racial and ethnic composition Note: the US Census treats Hispanic/Latino as an ethnic category. This table excludes Latinos from the racial categories and assigns them to a separate category. Hispanics/Latinos may be of any race.
Race / Ethnicity (NH = Non-Hispanic)	Pop 2020	% 2020
White alone (NH)	4	5.48%
Black or African American alone (NH)	68	93.15%
Native American or Alaska Native alone (NH)	0	0.00%
Asian alone (NH)	0	0.00%
Native Hawaiian or Pacific Islander alone (NH)	0	0.00%
Other race alone (NH)	0	0.00%
Mixed race or Multiracial (NH)	0	0.00%
Hispanic or Latino (any race)	1	1.37%
Total	73	100.00%

== Notable people ==
- Sam Carr, drummer for The Jelly Roll Kings; raised in Dundee.
- Dub Garrett, American football player
- Oliver Sain, musician.

== Gallery ==
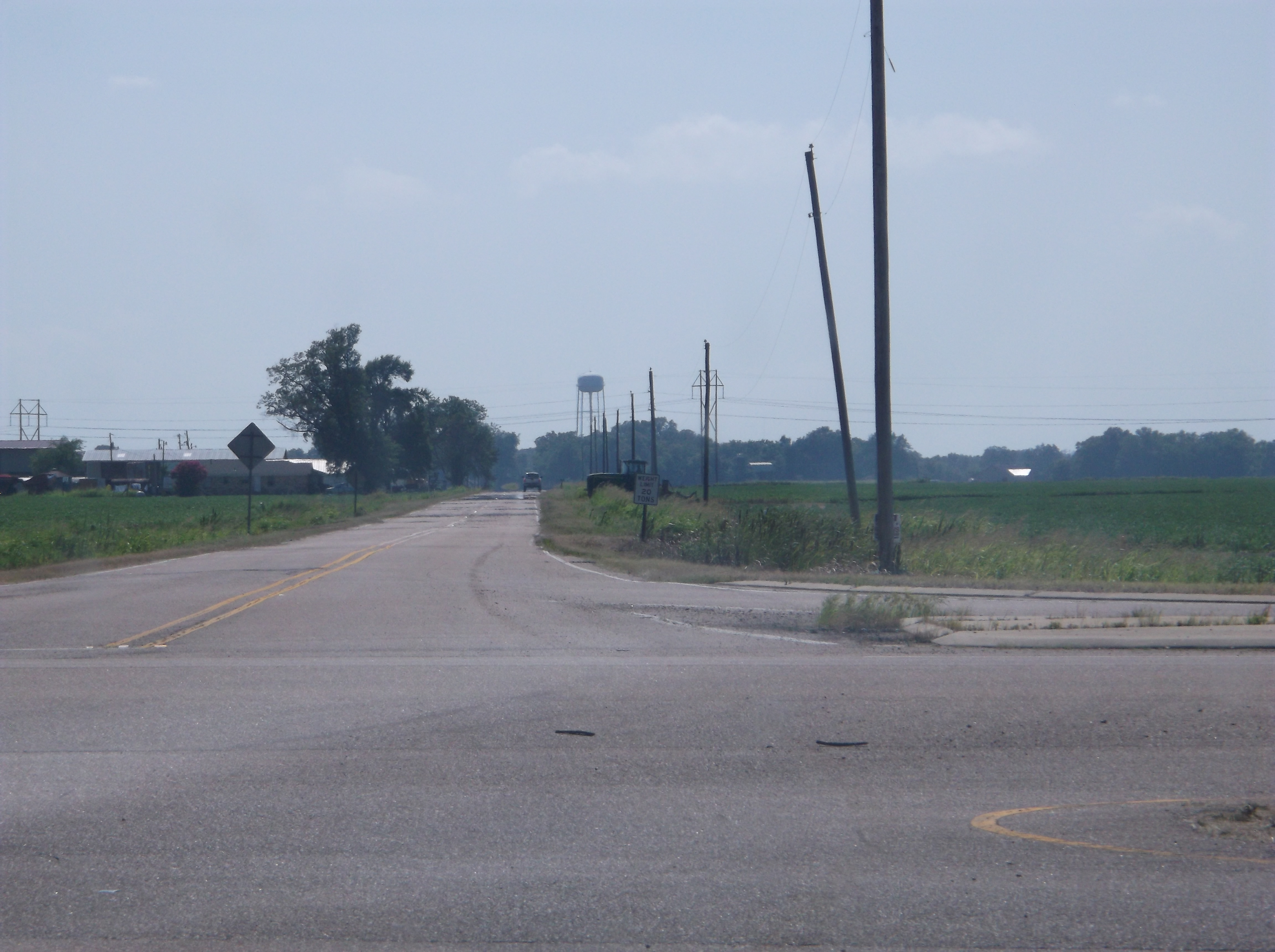
View of the community from US Highway 61

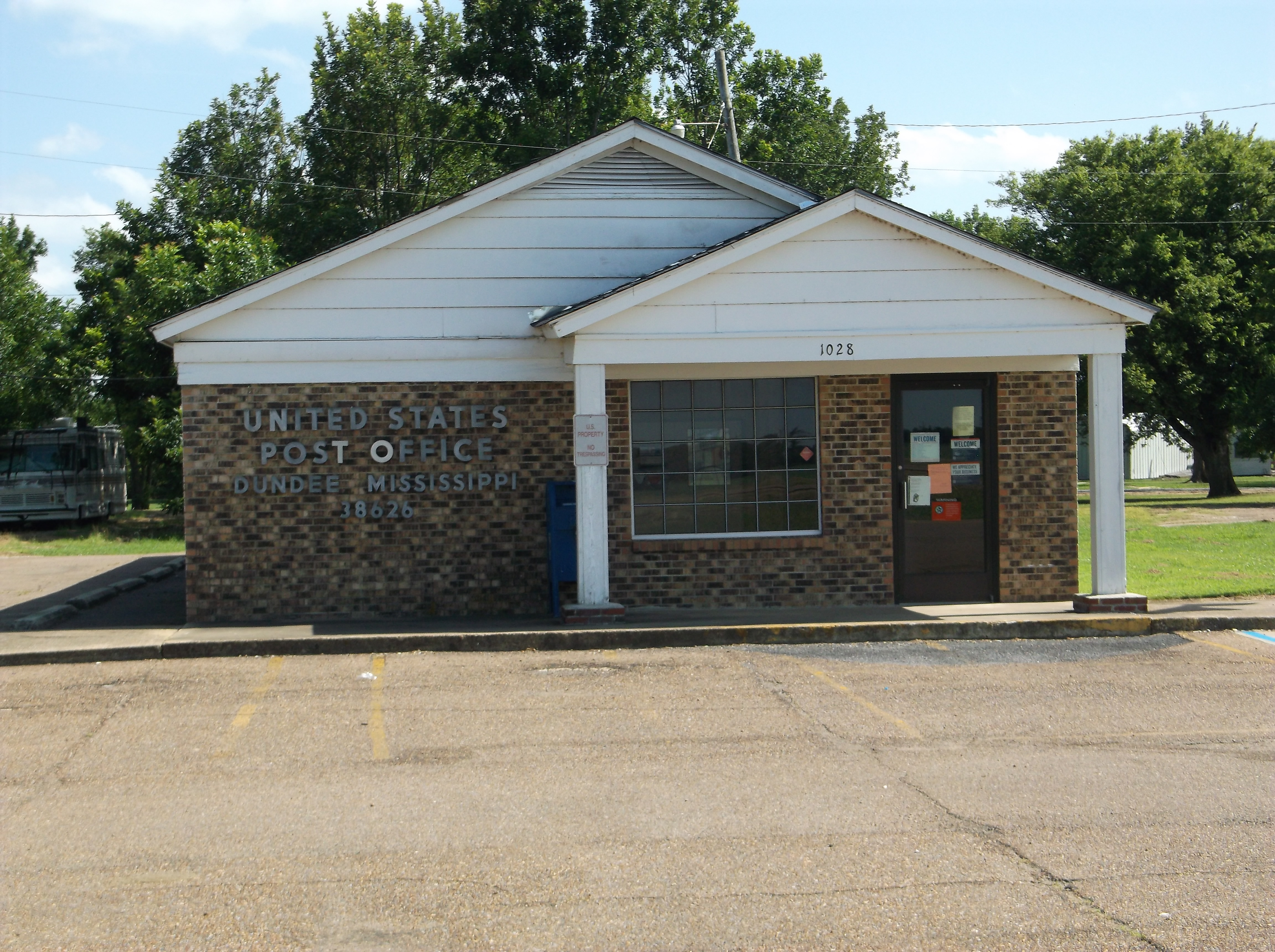
Post office located off of [US Route 61]

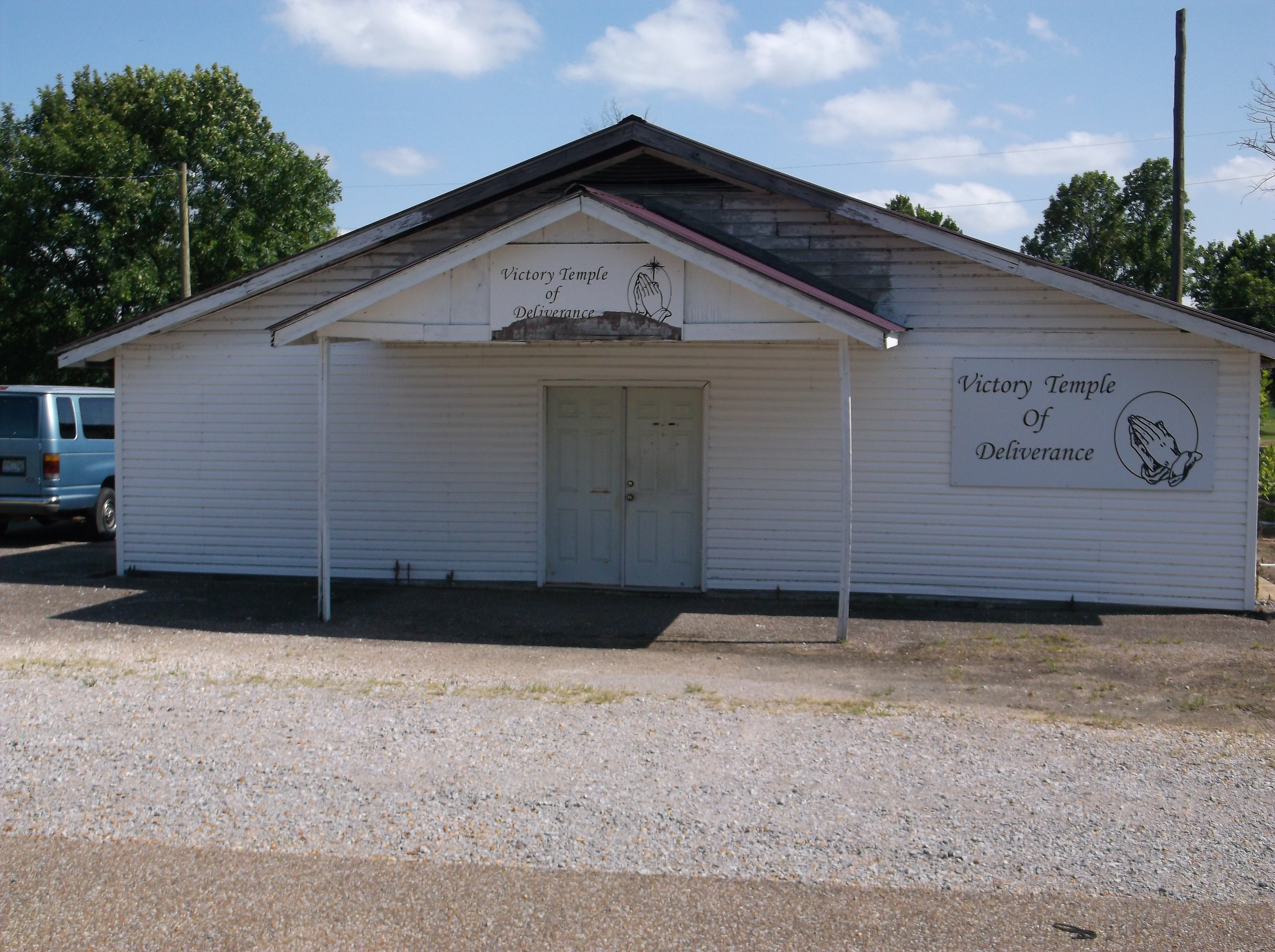
Victory Temple of Deliverance Church in Dundee
