= Off Yonder Wall =

Studio album by the Jelly Roll Kings
- Released: 1997
- Recorded: 1995
- Genre: Blues
- Length: 48:18
- Label: Fat Possum
- Producer: Robert Palmer

The Jelly Roll Kings chronology
Rockin' the Juke Joint Down (1979)	Off Yonder Wall (1997)

Off Yonder Wall is an album by the American band the Jelly Roll Kings, released in 1997. Although the trio had played off and on for more than 40 years, Off Yonder Wall was just their second album. The album was nominated for W. C. Handy Awards for "Comeback Blues Album" and "Traditional Blues Album".

== Production ==
Recorded in 1995, the album was produced by Robert Palmer, who sought a low fidelity sound. It was Palmer's final production work. Big Jack Johnson was backed by harmonica player and keyboardist Frank Frost and drummer Sam Carr. The cover of Arthur Crudup's "That's Alright Mama" begins with a minutes-long guitar solo. The instrumental version of "Sitting on Top of the World" was inspired by Howlin' Wolf's take on the Walter Vinson and Lonnie Chatmon song. "Frank Frost Blues" is about a bandmember's alcohol abuse. An earlier version of "Have Mercy Baby" was included on the band's debut album. "I'm a Big Boy Now" ends with Johnson yodeling the album to a close.

== Critical reception ==
Professional ratings
Review scores
Source	Rating
AllMusic	4/5 stars
The Commercial Appeal	4/4 stars
Lincoln Journal Star	4/5 stars
The Penguin Guide to Blues Recordings	3/4 stars
Pittsburgh Post-Gazette	3/4 stars
The Tampa Tribune	3/4 stars

The Lincoln Journal Star praised the "distinctive spare sound". The Dayton Daily News stated that the Kings "know that the hallmark of their deep-South, swampy sound is absence of frills, and they work hard with what they've got." The New York Times opined that the band possesses "a rangy interplay that's purely their own". Guitar Player noted the "raw, raucous juke grooves". The Pittsburgh Post-Gazette said that "the trio pours out big, fat blue notes in easy, hypnotic rhythms."

The Village Voice concluded that "Johnson joins a jazzer's resourcefulness and edge with a raw, crudely powerful tone reminiscent of the earliest electric guitarists; he hovers on the edge of atonality like Roy Buchanan but every note is heartfelt." The St. Louis Post-Dispatch labeled Off Yonder Wall a "down-home shouter blues, full but uncluttered, pure hominy and molasses", writing that the Kings were "among the relatively few middle-aged veterans moving the heavy freight of contemporary Delta blues in its electric derivation." The Tampa Tribune noted that "the lyrics concern life's essentials: women, drinking, fishing and women." The Boston Herald considered the album to be one of 1997's best blues recordings; Nashville Scene listed it among the 20 best albums of the year.

== Track listing ==
No.	Title	Length
1.	"Frank Frost Blues"	4:17
2.	"That's Alright Mama"	4:34
3.	"Look over Yonder Wall"	6:05
4.	"So Lonesome"	5:43
5.	"Baby Please Don't Go"	3:56
6.	"Fishin' Musician"	6:59
7.	"Fat Back"	4:32
8.	"Sitting on Top of the World"	2:59
9.	"Have Mercy Baby"	4:39
10.	"I'm a Big Boy Now"	4:34
Total length:		48:18
