= Daddy, When Is Mama Comin Home? =

Studio album by Big Jack Johnson
- Released: 1990
- Genre: Blues
- Length: 63:59
- Label: Earwig
- Producer: Michael Robert Frank; Big Jack Johnson

Big Jack Johnson chronology
Rooster Blues (1987)	Daddy, When Is Mama Comin Home? (1990)	We Got to Stop This Killin' (1996)

Daddy, When Is Mama Comin Home? is an album by the American musician Big Jack Johnson, released in 1990. He supported the album with a North American tour that included shows with Frank Frost. The title track is performed by Johnson in Robert Palmer's film Deep Blues: A Musical Pilgrimage to the Crossroads.

== Production ==
Daddy, When Is Mama Comin Home? was produced by Michael Robert Frank and Johnson. It was recorded in Chicago, with Johnson taking a year to work on it. Frost played harmonica on the album; Sam Carr contributed on drums. Palmer wrote the album liner notes. The album's sound was more polished, with Johnson using a horn section on some tracks. "Mr. U.S. A.I.D.S." was one of the first blues songs to address the impact of AIDS. "Doodley Squat" was influenced by Latin funk. "Northwest Airline Blues" is a salute to Johnson's preferred airline. "United States Got Us in a Bad Shape" is about joblessness and failing family farms.

== Critical reception ==
Professional ratings
Review scores
Source	Rating
AllMusic	3/5 stars
MusicHound Blues: The Essential Album Guide	3.5/5 stars
The Penguin Guide to Blues Recordings	4/4 stars
The Philadelphia Inquirer	3.5/4 stars

The Chicago Sun-Times considered the album "a purist's delight", writing that "ardent blues fans also will be emancipated by the agitated guitar of Johnson, who plays like he puts a chord in a vise and twists it until it is squeezed of all emotion." The Chicago Tribune determined that Johnson "winds up in some bizarre but beautiful blues ozone created by his stinging guitar lines and genuinely strange and frequently comic detours into Caribbean and Chinese blues, yodeling and free verse." The Washington Post labeled Daddy, When Is Mama Comin Home? "one of the most original, topical and idiosyncratic blues albums ever released." The Commercial Appeal noted "Johnson's booming, resilient voice and choppy, biting guitar".

In 1994, Rolling Stone praised "Johnson's audacious originals." MusicHound Blues: The Essential Album Guide concluded that Daddy, When Is Mama Comin Home? "works extremely well as a protest album". The Star Tribune called "I Slapped My Wife in the Face" "startling" and "sorrowful".

== Track listing ==
Daddy, When Is Mama Comin Home? track listing
No.	Title	Length
1.	"Thirteen Chillun"	4:38
2.	"I'm a Big Boy Now"	3:31
3.	"Oh Darling"	5:11
4.	"Doodley Squat"	5:47
5.	"Crawdad Hole"	6:13
6.	"Chinese Blues"	5:19
7.	"Daddy, When Is Mama Comin Home?"	7:58
8.	"I Slapped My Wife in the Face"	4:49
9.	"Northwest Airline Blues"	3:59
10.	"Goin Back to Mississippi"	5:54
11.	"Mr. U.S. A.I.D.S."	4:51
12.	"United States Got Us in a Bad Shape"	5:49
Total length:		63:59
