= Donald Hawkins =

American football player (born 1992)

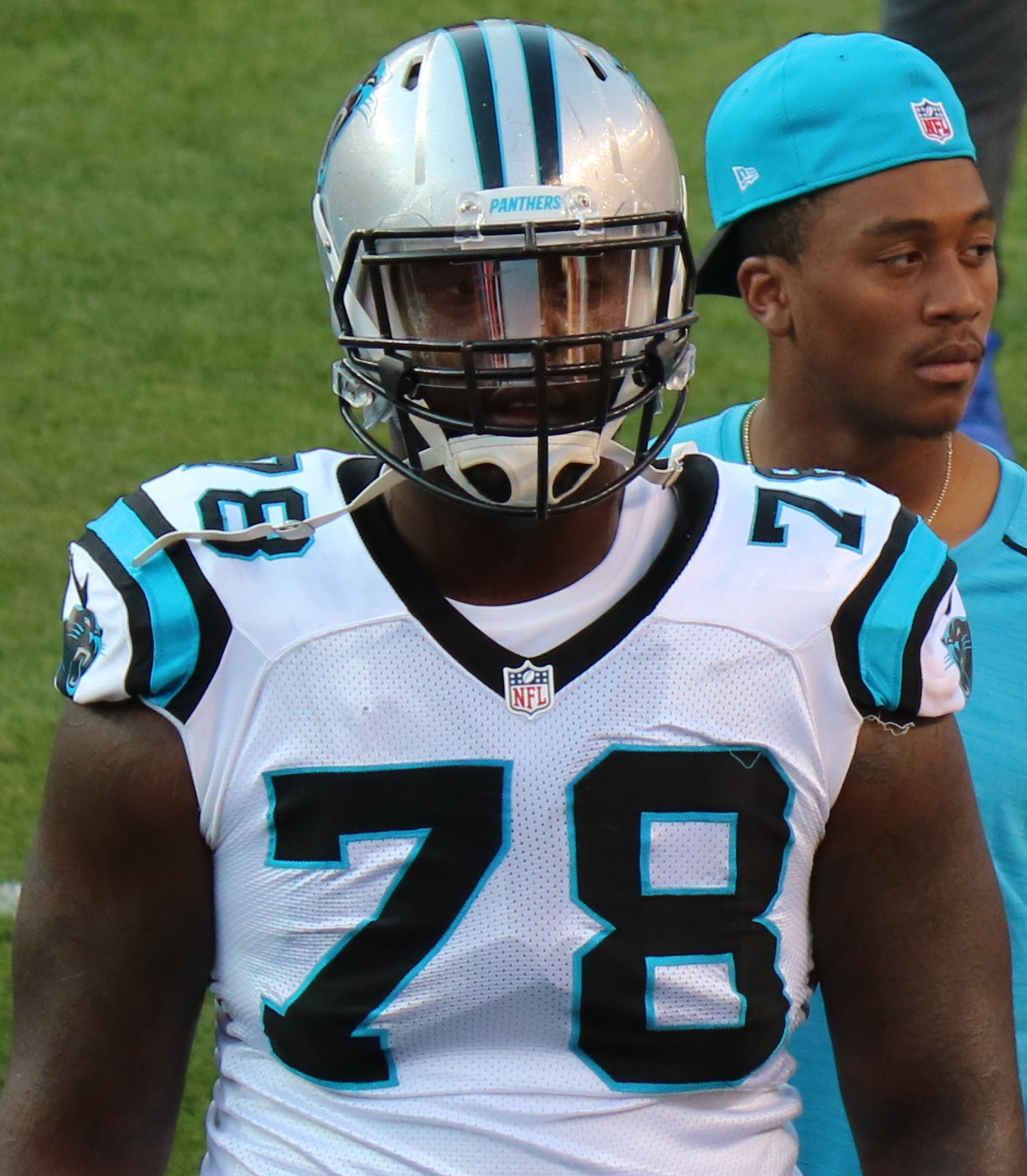
- Hawkins with the Carolina Panthers in 2016

No. 71, 78, 61
- Position: Tackle

Personal information
- Born: April 22, 1992 (age 34); Tunica, Mississippi, U.S.
- Listed height: 6 ft 5 in (1.96 m)
- Listed weight: 310 lb (141 kg)

Career information
- High school: Rosa Fort (Tunica County, Mississippi)
- College: Texas
- NFL draft: 2014: undrafted

Career history
- Philadelphia Eagles (2014)*; Cleveland Browns (2014)*; Dallas Cowboys (2014); Miami Dolphins (2015)*; San Francisco 49ers (2015)*; Carolina Panthers (2016); New York Jets (2016); Kansas City Chiefs (2017); San Antonio Commanders (2019)*; Arizona Hotshots (2019)*; Orlando Apollos (2019)*; Memphis Express (2019); Montreal Alouettes (2020–2022)
- * Offseason or practice squad member only

Awards and highlights
- Second-team All-Big 12 (2013)

Career NFL statistics
- Games played: 8
- Stats at Pro Football Reference

Donald Hawkins (born April 22, 1992) is an American former professional football player who was a tackle in the National Football League (NFL) and Canadian Football League (CFL). He played college football at Northwest Mississippi Community College and the University of Texas. Hawkins has been a member of the Philadelphia Eagles, Cleveland Browns, Dallas Cowboys, Miami Dolphins, San Francisco 49ers, Carolina Panthers, New York Jets, Kansas City Chiefs, San Antonio Commanders, Arizona Hotshots, Orlando Apollos, Memphis Express, and Montreal Alouettes.

== Early life ==
Hawkins played high school football at Rosa Fort High School in Tunica, Mississippi. He played multiple positions on the offensive and defensive lines. He was an 1st team all-district selection in 2008 and 2009. Hawkins was named team captain as a senior in 2009 when his team finished as co-district champions with a 6-5 record and appeared in the 4A playoffs.

== College career ==
Hawkins first played college football for the Northwest Mississippi Community College Rangers from 2010 to 2011. He was named a 2011 National Junior College Athletic Association First-team All-American, First-team All State, First-team All Region 23 team, Offensive Line MVP In Region 23. He transferred to play for the Texas Longhorns from 2012 to 2013. Hawkins started 24 of 25 career games during his time with the Longhorns. He was named a 2013 First-team All-Big 12 selection.

== Professional career ==
Pre-draft measurables
Height	Weight	40-yard dash	10-yard split	20-yard split	20-yard shuttle	Three-cone drill	Vertical jump	Broad jump	Bench press
6 ft 4 in (1.93 m)	295 lb (134 kg)	5.55 s	1.84 s	3.15 s	4.88 s	8.00 s	32 in (0.81 m)	8 ft 6 in (2.59 m)	20 reps
All values from Texas Pro Day

=== Philadelphia Eagles ===
Hawkins signed with the Philadelphia Eagles on May 10, 2014 after going undrafted in the 2014 NFL draft. He was released by the Eagles on August 23, 2014.

=== Cleveland Browns ===
Hawkins was claimed off waivers by the Cleveland Browns on August 25, 2014. He was released by the Browns on August 30, 2014.

=== Dallas Cowboys ===
Hawkins signed with the Dallas Cowboys on August 31, 2014. He was waived by the Cowboys on May 8, 2015.

=== Miami Dolphins ===
Hawkins was signed by the Miami Dolphins on May 11, 2015. He was released by the Dolphins on September 4 and signed to the team's practice squad on September 8, 2015. He was released by the Dolphins on November 12, 2015.

=== San Francisco 49ers ===
On November 16, 2015, the San Francisco 49ers signed Hawkins to their practice squad.

=== Carolina Panthers ===
On January 26, 2016, Hawkins signed a futures contract with the Carolina Panthers. He was released by the Panthers on November 25, 2016.

=== New York Jets ===
On November 30, 2016, Hawkins was signed to the New York Jets' practice squad. He was promoted to the active roster on December 20, 2016. He was released by the Jets on May 7, 2017.

=== Kansas City Chiefs ===
On June 16, 2017, Hawkins signed with the Kansas City Chiefs. He was waived/injured on September 2, 2017, and placed on injured reserve. He was released on November 14, 2017.

=== Alliance of American Football ===
On January 3, 2019, Hawkins signed with the San Antonio Commanders of the Alliance of American Football (AAF). He was waived on January 7, 2019, and subsequently claimed off waivers by the Arizona Hotshots. He was then traded to the Orlando Apollos on January 14, 2019, in exchange for wide receiver Freddie Martino. He was waived during final roster cuts on January 30, 2019. The Memphis Express signed him to a contract on February 19, 2019, but waived him on February 21.

=== Montreal Alouettes ===
Hawkins signed with the Montreal Alouettes of the CFL on February 3, 2021. He was placed on the suspended list on July 6, 2021. He was released on February 14, 2023.
