= Tunica Elementary School =

Tunica Elementary School may refer to:

- Tunica Elementary School - Tunica, Mississippi - Tunica County School District
- Tunica Elementary School - West Feliciana Parish, Louisiana - West Feliciana Parish Public Schools
