= 2014 Mississippi State Bulldogs football team =

American college football season

2014 Mississippi State Bulldogs football

Orange Bowl, L 34–49 vs. Georgia Tech
- Conference: Southeastern Conference
- Western Division

Ranking
- Coaches: No. 12
- AP: No. 11
- Record: 10–3 (6–2 SEC)
- Head coach: Dan Mullen (6th season)
- Co-offensive coordinators: Billy Gonzales (1st season); John Hevesy (1st season)
- Offensive scheme: Spread option
- Defensive coordinator: Geoff Collins (4th season)
- Base defense: 4–3
- Home stadium: Davis Wade Stadium

2014 Southeastern Conference football standings
	Conf.			Overall
Team	W		L	W		L
Eastern Division
No. 14 Missouri x	7	–	1	11	–	3
No. 9 Georgia	6	–	2	10	–	3
Florida	4	–	4	7	–	5
Tennessee	3	–	5	7	–	6
South Carolina	3	–	5	7	–	6
Kentucky	2	–	6	5	–	7
Vanderbilt	0	–	8	3	–	9
Western Division
No. 4 Alabama x$^	7	–	1	12	–	2
No. 11 Mississippi State	6	–	2	10	–	3
No. 17 Ole Miss *	5	–	3	9	–	4
No. 22 Auburn	4	–	4	8	–	5
LSU *	4	–	4	8	–	5
Texas A&M	3	–	5	8	–	5
Arkansas	2	–	6	7	–	6
Championship: Alabama 42, Missouri 13
^ – College Football Playoff participant; $ – Conference champion; x – Division champion/co-champions; * LSU and Ole Miss vacated all wins (except for Ole Miss' win over Presbyterian) due to NCAA violations.; Rankings from AP Poll

The 2014 Mississippi State Bulldogs football team represented Mississippi State University in the 2014 NCAA Division I FBS football season. The team was coached by Dan Mullen, who was in his sixth season with Mississippi State. The Bulldogs played their home games at the newly expanded and renovated Davis Wade Stadium in Starkville, Mississippi and competed in the Western Division of the Southeastern Conference (SEC).

The 2014 season was one of the most successful seasons in Mississippi State's 110-year football history. In mid-October, they shot to #1 in the polls for the first time in school history, and the highest that any FBS team in Mississippi had been ranked at that late date in the season in half a century. They ultimately finished 10–3, the third 10-win season in school history. They netted a berth in the Orange Bowl, the second major-bowl appearance in school history, where they were defeated by Georgia Tech.

== Before the season ==
=== Departing players ===
Key losses for the Bulldogs included:

- Denico Autry, starting defensive end and current member of the Houston Texans
- Gabe Jackson, offensive guard who was selected by the Raiders in the third round of the 2014 NFL draft
- LaDarius Perkins, starting running back and fifth on the Bulldogs' career leaderboard with 2,554 rushing yards
- Tyler Russell, whose 5,441 passing yards ranked third in school history at the time
- Deontae Skinner, starting linebacker
- Nickoe Whitley, a four-year starter at safety with 15 career interceptions and 2 key late-game forced fumbles to seal games in 2013

=== Preseason prognostication ===
The Bulldogs were picked to finish 5th in the SEC West by a vote of 229 media writers at the 2014 SEC Media Days, while Athlon Sports and NBC Sports both picked the Bulldogs to come in sixth.

=== Roster and staff ===
2014 Mississippi State Bulldogs football team roster
Players
Coaches
Offense

Pos.	#	Name	Class
WR	1	De'Runnya Wilson	So
WR	4	Jameon Lewis	Sr
WR	5	Fred Brown	So
TE	6	Malcolm Johnson	Sr
RB	7	Nick Griffin	Sr
WR	8	Fred Ross	So
QB	10	Josiah Phillips	Fr
RB	10	Brandon Holloway	So
QB	11	Damian Williams	So
WR	12	Robert Johnson	Sr
RB	13	Josh Robinson	Jr
QB	14	Elijah Staley	Fr
QB	15	Dak Prescott	Jr
WR	16	Joe Morrow	Jr
QB	17	Nick Fitzgerald	Fr
TE	18	Brandon Hill	Sr
ATH	19	Zak Neary	Fr
TE	19	Gus Walley	So
RB	27	Aeris Williams	Fr
RB	32	Ashton Shumpert	So
ATH	33	Boderick Oliver	Fr
RB	33	Dontavian Lee	Fr
WR	35	Gabe Myles	Fr
RB	37	Bennie Braswell III	Fr
TE	53	Hunter Bradley	So
ATH	54	Lawrence Brown	So
OL	56	Nick Proby	Jr
OL	58	Justin Senior	So
OL	59	Archie Muniz	Sr
OL	60	Jamaal Clayborn	So
OL	61	Deion Calhoun	Fr
OL	62	Devon Desper	So
OL	63	Dillon Day	Sr
OL	64	Jocquell Johnson	Jr
OL	66	Ben Beckwith	Sr
OL	70	Justin Malone	Jr
OL	71	Cole Carter	So
OL	73	Elgton Jenkins	Fr
OL	74	Kent Flowers	Fr
OL	75	Blaine Clausell	Sr
OL	76	Jake Thomas	Fr
OL	77	Rufus Warren	Jr
OL	78	Damien Robinson (injured)	Sr
OL	79	Ronald Cochran	Fr
WR	80	Shelby Christy	Fr
WR	81	Jamoral Graham	Fr
WR	83	Kareem Vance, Jr.	Fr
TE	84	Darrion Hutcherson	Jr
TE	85	Rashun Dixon	Fr
WR	86	Jesse Jackson	Fr
TE	87	B.J. Hammond	Fr
TE	88	Aaron Hamaker	Fr

Defense

Pos.	#	Name	Class
DB	2	Will Redmond	Jr
DB	3	Jay Hughes	Sr
LB	4	Gerri Green	Fr
DB	5	Jamerson Love	Sr
DB	9	Justin Cox	Sr
DB	11	Kivon Coman	So
DB	13	Cedric Jiles (injured)	So
LB	14	Zach Jackson	Jr
DB	17	Deontay Evans	So
DB	18	Tyrell Miller	Jr
DB	20	Brandon Bryant	Fr
LB	22	Matthew Wells	Sr
DB	23	Taveze Calhoun	Jr
DB	24	Chris Rayford	Fr
DB	25	Jahmere Irvin-Sills	Fr
DB	26	Kendrick Market	Jr
LB	28	DeAndre Ward	So
LB	29	Quadry Antoine	So
ATH	30	Brandon Wells	Fr
DB	31	Tolando Cleveland	So
DB	32	Brandon Davis	So
DL	34	Cory Thomas	Fr
LB	39	Richie Brown	So
LB	42	Beniquez Brown	So
LB	44	Christian Holmes	Sr
LB	45	J. T. Gray	Fr
LB	46	Dezmond Harris	Fr
DL	47	A.J. Jefferson	So
DL	48	Ryan Brown	Jr
DL	49	Torrey Dale	So
LB	50	Benardrick McKinney	Jr
LB	51	Kelan Chairs	Fr
DL	57	Will Coleman	Jr
DL	67	Rodney Lacy	So
DL	88	Nick James	So
DL	90	Grant Harris	Fr
DL	91	Preston Smith	Sr
DL	92	Kaleb Eulls	Sr
DL	93	P.J. Jones	Sr
DL	94	Nelson Adams	So
DL	95	Braxton Hoyett	Fr
DL	96	Chris Jones	So
DL	98	Curtis Virges	Sr
DL	99	John Harris	Jr

Special teams

Pos.	#	Name	Class
K	35	Westin Graves	Fr
LS	38	Winston Chapman	Jr
K/P	40	Devon Bell	Jr
K	41	Evan Sobiesk	So
K/P	43	Logan Cooke	Fr

Head coach

- Dan Mullen – 6th year

Coordinators/assistant coaches

- Billy Gonzales (Co-OC/Wide Receivers) – 2nd year
- John Hevesy (Co-OC/Offensive Linemen) – 6th year
- Brian Johnson (Quarterbacks) – 1st year
- Greg Knox (Running backs) – 6th year
- Scott Sallach (Tight ends) – 6th year
- Geoff Collins (DC/Linebackers) – 4th year
- Tony Hughes (Safeties) – 5th year
- Deshea Townsend (Cornerbacks) – 2nd year
- David Turner (Defensive Linemen) – 2nd year

Legend

- (C) Team captain
- (S) Suspended
- (I) Ineligible
- Injured
- Redshirt

Roster
Last update: May 3, 2015

== Schedule ==
Date	Time	Opponent	Rank	Site	TV	Result	Attendance
August 30	6:30 p.m.	Southern Miss*		Davis Wade Stadium; Starkville, MS	SECN	W 49–0	61,889
September 6	1:00 p.m.	UAB*		Davis Wade Stadium; Starkville, MS	SECRN	W 47–34	57,704
September 13	3:00 p.m.	at South Alabama*		Ladd–Peebles Stadium; Mobile, AL	ESPNews	W 35–3	38,129
September 20	6:00 p.m.	at No. 8 LSU		Tiger Stadium; Baton Rouge, LA (rivalry)	ESPN	W 34–29	102,321
October 4	11:00 a.m.	No. 6 Texas A&M	No. 12	Davis Wade Stadium; Starkville, MS (SEC Nation)	ESPN	W 48–31	61,133
October 11	2:30 p.m.	No. 2 Auburn	No. 3	Davis Wade Stadium; Starkville, MS (College GameDay)	CBS	W 38–23	62,945‡
October 25	2:30 p.m.	at Kentucky	No. 1	Commonwealth Stadium; Lexington, KY (SEC Nation)	CBS	W 45–31	64,791
November 1	6:15 p.m.	Arkansas	No. 1	Davis Wade Stadium; Starkville, MS	ESPN2	W 17–10	62,307
November 8	3:00 p.m.	UT Martin*^{†}	No. 1	Davis Wade Stadium; Starkville, MS	SECN	W 45–16	61,421
November 15	2:30 p.m.	at No. 5 Alabama	No. 1	Bryant–Denny Stadium; Tuscaloosa, AL (rivalry) (College GameDay)	CBS	L 20–25	101,821
November 22	6:30 p.m.	Vanderbilt	No. 4	Davis Wade Stadium; Starkville, MS	SECN	W 51–0	60,493
November 29	2:30 p.m.	at No. 19 Ole Miss	No. 4	Vaught–Hemingway Stadium; Oxford, MS (Egg Bowl / SEC Nation)	CBS	L 17–31	62,058
December 31	6:30 p.m.	vs. No. 12 Georgia Tech*	No. 7	Sun Life Stadium; Miami Gardens, FL (Orange Bowl)	ESPN	L 34–49	58,211
*Non-conference game; ^{†}Homecoming; Rankings from AP Poll (and CFP Rankings, after October 28) - Released prior to game; All times are in Central time

Schedule source:

- ‡ New Davis Wade Stadium Attendance Record

== Game summaries ==
=== Southern Miss ===
Southern Miss at Mississippi State

Team	1	2	3	4	Total
Golden Eagles	0	0	0	0	0
• Bulldogs	7	21	14	7	49

- Date: August 30
- Location: Davis Wade Stadium
  Starkville, MS
- Game start: 6:30 p.m. CDT
- Elapsed time: 3:08
- Game attendance: 61,889
- Game weather: 72 °F (22 °C), Overcast with rain, winds S 3mph
- Referee: Steve LaMantia
- TV announcers (SECN): Dave Neal (Play-by-play), Andre Ware (Color), & Laura Rutledge (Sideline)

Scoring summary
1	12:35	MSU	De'Runnya Wilson 25-yard touchdown pass from Dak Prescott, Evan Sobiesk kick good	MSU 7–0
2	12:22	MSU	Nick Griffin 1-yard touchdown run, Evan Sobiesk kick good	MSU 14–0
2	4:15	MSU	Fred Ross 35-yard touchdown pass from Dak Prescott, Westin Graves kick good	MSU 21–0
2	0:35	MSU	Malcolm Johnson 23-yard touchdown pass from Dak Prescott, Evan Sobiesk kick good	MSU 28–0
3	10:52	MSU	De'Runnya Wilson 24-yard touchdown pass from Dak Prescott, Westin Graves kick good	MSU 35–0
3	5:02	MSU	Jay Hughes 68-yd blocked FG return, Evan Sobiesk kick good	MSU 42–0
4	7:51	MSU	Fred Ross 21-yard touchdown pass from Damian Williams, Westin Graves kick good	MSU 49–0

*Mississippi State won the games on the field in 1975 and 1976, but were later forced to forfeit the games by the NCAA due to an NCAA rules violation in which offensive lineman Larry Gillard received a 33 percent discount at an Okolona, Mississippi clothing store.

=== UAB ===
UAB at Mississippi State

Team	1	2	3	4	Total
Blazers	3	17	7	7	34
• Bulldogs	13	13	21	0	47

- Date: September 6
- Location: Davis Wade Stadium
  Starkville, MS
- Game start: 1:00 p.m. CDT
- Elapsed time: 3:35
- Game attendance: 57,704
- Game weather: 86 °F (30 °C), Partly cloudy, winds N 3 MPH
- Referee: Matt Moore
- TV announcers (SECRN): Bob Rathbun (Play-by-play) & Tim Couch (Color)

Scoring summary
1	14:03	MSU	Robert Johnson 68-yard touchdown pass from Dak Prescott, Evan Sobiesk kick good	MSU 7–0
1	5:31	UAB	Ty Long 44-yard kick good	MSU 7–3
1	0:43	MSU	Preston Smith 21-yard interception return, Westin Graves kick failed	MSU 13–3
2	14:13	UAB	Jordan Howard 2-yard touchdown run, Ty Long kick good	MSU 13–10
2	13:03	UAB	JJ Nelson 88-yard touchdown pass from Jeremi Briscoe, Ty Long kick good	UAB 17–13
2	11:37	MSU	Josh Robinson 17-yd touchdown run, Evan Sobiesk kick failed	MSU 19–17
2	8:06	UAB	Ty Long 46-yard kick good	UAB 20–19
2	5:02	MSU	Gus Walley 20-yard touchdown pass from Dak Prescott, Evan Sobiesk kick good	MSU 26–20
3	13:03	MSU	Dak Prescott 4-yard touchdown run, Evan Sobiesk kick good	MSU 33–20
3	6:40	MSU	Joe Morrow 15-yard touchdown pass from Dak Prescott, Evan Sobiesk kick good	MSU 40–20
3	5:49	UAB	Josh Magee 81-yard touchdown pass from Cody Clements, Ty Long kick good	MSU 40–27
3	1:49	MSU	De'Runnya Wilson 8-yard touchdown pass from Dak Prescott, Evan Sobiesk kick good	MSU 47–27
4	0:49	UAB	Quincy Perdue 75-yard touchdown pass from Jeremi Briscoe, Ty Long kick good	MSU 47–34

=== South Alabama ===
Mississippi State at South Alabama

Team	1	2	3	4	Total
• Bulldogs	7	21	7	0	35
Jaguars	0	3	0	0	3

- Date: September 13
- Location: Ladd–Peebles Stadium
  Mobile, AL
- Game start: 3:00 p.m. CDT
- Elapsed time: 3:13
- Game attendance: 38,129
- Game weather: 86 °F (30 °C), Partly cloudy, Winds NNE 7 mph
- Referee: Matt Loeffler
- TV announcers (ESPNews): Mike Couzens (Play-by-play) & Rene Ingoglia (Color)

Scoring summary
1	4:56	MSU	Malcolm Johnson 15-yard touchdown pass from Dak Prescott, Evan Sobiesk kick good	MSU 7–0
2	9:30	USA	Aleem Sunanon 26-yard kick good	MSU 7–3
2	7:00	MSU	Josh Robinson 2-yard touchdown run, Evan Sobiesk kick good	MSU 14–3
2	4:27	MSU	Dak Prescott 24-yard touchdown pass from Jameon Lewis, Evan Sobiesk kick good	MSU 21–3
2	2:58	MSU	Josh Robinson 15-yard touchdown run, Evan Sobiesk kick good	MSU 28–3
3	7:17	MSU	Dak Prescott 40-yard touchdown run, Evan Sobiesk kick good	MSU 35–3

=== LSU ===
Mississippi State at #8 LSU

Team	1	2	3	4	Total
• Bulldogs	14	3	14	3	34
No. 8 Tigers	0	3	7	19	29

- Date: September 20
- Location: Tiger Stadium
  Baton Rouge, LA
- Game start: 6:00 p.m. CDT
- Elapsed time: 3:37
- Game attendance: 102,321
- Game weather: 85 °F (29 °C), Clear sunny, Winds East 4-7 mph
- Referee: Hubert Owens
- TV announcers (ESPN): Brad Nessler (Play-by-play), Todd Blackledge (Color), & Holly Rowe (Sideline)

Scoring summary
1	10:47	MSU	De'Runnya Wilson 9-yard touchdown pass from Dak Prescott, Evan Sobiesk kick good	MSU 7–0
1	0:45	MSU	Josh Robinson 3-yard touchdown run, Evan Sobiesk kick good	MSU 14–0
2	9:26	MSU	Evan Sobiesk 27-yard kick good	MSU 17–0
2	1:20	LSU	Colby Delahoussaye 30-yard kick good	MSU 17–3
3	14:48	LSU	Danielle Hunter 25-yard fumble recovery, Colby Delahoussaye kick good	MSU 17–10
3	12:44	MSU	Dak Prescott 56-yard touchdown run, Evan Sobiesk kick good	MSU 24–10
3	9:35	MSU	Jameon Lewis 74-yard touchdown pass from Dak Prescott, Evan Sobiesk kick good	MSU 31–10
4	14:49	MSU	Evan Sobiesk 28-yard kick good	MSU 34–10
4	12:34	LSU	Kenny Hilliard 30-yard touchdown run, Anthony Jennings rush failed	MSU 34–16
4	1:55	LSU	Malachi Dupre 31-yard touchdown pass from Brandon Harris, Brandon Harris rushed failed	MSU 34–22
4	1:27	LSU	Malachi Dupre 30-yard touchdown pass from Brandon Harris, Colby Delahoussaye kick good	MSU 34–29

=== Texas A&M ===
#6 Texas A&M at #12 Mississippi State

Team	1	2	3	4	Total
No. 6 Aggies	7	3	7	14	31
• No. 12 Bulldogs	14	14	13	7	48

- Date: October 4
- Location: Davis Wade Stadium
  Starkville, MS
- Game start: 11:00 a.m. CDT
- Elapsed time: 3:30
- Game attendance: 61,133
- Game weather: 59 °F (15 °C), Sunny, Winds Northwest 9 mph
- Referee: Ken Williamson
- TV announcers (ESPN): Dave Pasch (Play-by-play), Brian Griese (Color), & Tom Luginbill (Sideline)

Scoring summary
1	13:19	TAMU	Josh Reynolds 13-yard touchdown pass from Kenny Hill, Josh Lambo kick good	TAMU 7–0
1	10:30	MSU	Josh Robinson 1-yard touchdown run, Evan Sobiesk kick good	Tie 7–7
1	0:13	MSU	Josh Robinson 1-yard touchdown run, Evan Sobiesk kick good	MSU 14–7
2	8:33	MSU	Dak Prescott 1-yard touchdown run, Evan Sobiesk kick good	MSU 21–7
2	2:02	MSU	De'Runnya Wilson 9-yard touchdown pass from Dak Prescott, Evan Sobiesk kick good	MSU 28–7
2	0:02	TAMU	Josh Lambo 27-yard kick good	MSU 28–10
3	6:38	MSU	Dak Prescott 2-yard touchdown run, Evan Sobiesk kick block	MSU 34–10
3	3:33	TAMU	Speedy Noil 23-yard touchdown pass from Kenny Hill, Josh Lambo kick good	MSU 34–17
3	2:08	MSU	Fred Brown 51-yard touchdown pass from Dak Prescott, Evan Sobiesk kick good	MSU 41–17
4	10:19	MSU	Dak Prescott 11-yard touchdown run, Evan Sobiesk kick good	MSU 48–17
4	2:29	TAMU	Speedy Noil 6-yard touchdown pass from Kenny Hill, Josh Lambo kick good	MSU 48–24
4	1:25	TAMU	Josh Reynolds 23-yard touchdown pass from Kenny Hill, Josh Lambo kick good	MSU 48–31

=== Auburn ===
#2 Auburn at #3 Mississippi State

Team	1	2	3	4	Total
No. 2 Tigers	0	13	7	3	23
• No. 3 Bulldogs	21	7	0	10	38

- Date: October 11
- Location: Davis Wade Stadium
  Starkville, MS
- Game start: 2:30 p.m. CDT
- Elapsed time: 3:55
- Game attendance: 62,945
- Game weather: 83 °F (28 °C), Partly Cloudy, Winds Southwest 5 mph
- Referee: Tom Ritter
- TV announcers (CBS): Verne Lundquist (Play-by-play), Gary Danielson (Color), & Allie LaForce (Sideline)

Scoring summary
1	12:41	MSU	De'Runnya Wilson 34-yard touchdown pass from Dak Prescott, Evan Sobiesk kick good	MSU 7–0
1	11:30	MSU	Josh Robinson 1-yard touchdown run, Evan Sobiesk kick good	MSU 14–0
1	6:09	MSU	Dak Prescott 2-yard touchdown run, Evan Sobiesk kick good	MSU 21–0
2	14:57	AU	Daniel Carlson 21-yard kick good	MSU 21–3
2	11:17	AU	Daniel Carlson 22-yard kick good	MSU 21–6
2	5:26	AU	D'haquille Williams 9-yard touchdown pass from Nick Marshall, Daniel Carlson kick good	MSU 21–13
2	3:58	MSU	Dak Prescott 15-yard touchdown run, Evan Sobiesk kick block	MSU 28–13
3	6:09	AU	D'haquille Williams 15-yard touchdown pass from Nick Marshall, Daniel Carlson kick good	MSU 28–20
4	11:33	MSU	Evan Sobiesk 21-yard kick good	MSU 31–20
4	11:07	MSU	Josh Robinson 1-yard touchdown run, Evan Sobiesk kick good	MSU 38–20
4	7:43	AU	Daniel Carlson 42-yard kick good	MSU 38–23

=== Kentucky ===
#1 Mississippi State at Kentucky

Team	1	2	3	4	Total
• No. 1 Bulldogs	10	7	14	14	45
Wildcats	7	3	14	7	31

- Date: October 25
- Location: Commonwealth Stadium
  Lexington, KY
- Game start: 2:30 p.m. CDT
- Elapsed time: 3:37
- Game attendance: 64,791
- Game weather: 72 °F (22 °C), Fair, Winds West Southwest 12 mph
- Referee: Hubert Owens
- TV announcers (CBS): Verne Lundquist (Play-by-play), Gary Danielson (Color), & Allie LaForce (Sideline)

Scoring summary
1	8:38	MSU	Josh Robinson 12-yard touchdown run, Evan Sobiesk kick good	MSU 7–0
1	6:25	UK	Demarco Robinson 67-yard touchdown pass from Patrick Towles, Austin MacGinnis kick good	Tie 7–7
1	2:41	MSU	Evan Sobiesk 26-yard kick good	MSU 10–7
2	10:20	MSU	Dak Prescott 2-yard touchdown run, Evan Sobiesk kick good	MSU 17–7
2	6:18	UK	Austin MacGinnis 34-yard kick good	MSU 17–10
3	11:54	MSU	Dak Prescott 11-yard touchdown run, Evan Sobiesk kick good	MSU 24–10
3	8:33	UK	Patrick Towles 10-yard touchdown run, Austin MacGinnis kick block	MSU 24–17
3	4:44	MSU	Brandon Hill 8-yard touchdown pass from Dak Prescott, Evan Sobiesk kick good	MSU 31–17
3	3:32	UK	Javess Blue 58-yard touchdown pass from Patrick Towles, Austin MacGinnis kick good	MSU 31–24
4	11:47	MSU	Josh Robinson 73-yard touchdown run, Evan Sobiesk kick good	MSU 38–24
4	2:31	UK	Patrick Towles 4-yard touchdown run, Austin MacGinnis kick good	MSU 38–31
4	2:22	MSU	Christian Holmes 61-yard kickoff return, Evan Sobiesk kick good	MSU 45–31

=== Arkansas ===
Arkansas at #1 Mississippi State

Team	1	2	3	4	Total
Razorbacks	3	7	0	0	10
• No. 1 Bulldogs	0	7	3	7	17

- Date: November 1
- Location: Davis Wade Stadium
  Starkville, MS
- Game start: 6:15 p.m. CDT
- Elapsed time: 3:16
- Game attendance: 62,307
- Game weather: 45 °F (7 °C), Clear skies, Winds Northwest 5 mph
- Referee: David Smith
- TV announcers (ESPN2): Joe Tessitore (Play-by-play), Brock Huard (Color), & Shannon Spake (Sideline)

Scoring summary
1	9:50	Ark	Adam McFain 36-yard kick good	UAR 3–0
2	11:01	Ark	Alex Collins 1-yard touchdown run, Adam McFain kick good	UAR 10–0
2	7:30	MSU	Josh Robinson 3-yard touchdown run, Evan Sobiesk kick good	UAR 10–7
3	3:35	MSU	Evan Sobiesk 37-yard kick good	Tie 10–10
4	13:21	MSU	Fred Ross 69-yard touchdown pass from Dak Prescott, Evan Sobiesk kick good	MSU 17–10

=== Tennessee–Martin ===
Tennessee–Martin at #1 Mississippi State

Team	1	2	3	4	Total
Skyhawks	3	0	0	13	16
• No. 1 Bulldogs	7	17	14	7	45

- Date: November 8
- Location: Davis Wade Stadium
  Starkville, MS
- Game start: 3:00 p.m. CST
- Elapsed time: 3:18
- Game attendance: 61,421
- Game weather: 63 °F (17 °C), Partly cloudy, Winds Northwest 5 mph
- Referee: Marc Curles
- TV announcers (SECN): Brent Musburger (Play-by-play), Jesse Palmer (Color), & Maria Taylor (Sideline)

Scoring summary
1	6:44	MSU	Fred Brown 10-yard touchdown pass from Dak Prescott, Evan Sobiesk kick good	MSU 7–0
1	1:33	UTM	Jackson Redditt 33-yard kick good	MSU 7–3
2	14:49	MSU	Dak Prescott 48-yard touchdown run, Evan Sobiesk kick good	MSU 14–3
2	6:31	MSU	Brandon Holloway 35-yard touchdown run, Evan Sobiesk kick good	MSU 21–3
2	0:35	MSU	Evan Sobiesk 27-yard kick good	MSU 24–3
3	8:52	MSU	Joe Marrow 55-yard touchdown pass from Dak Prescott, Evan Sobiesk kick good	MSU 31–3
3	4:40	MSU	Ashton Shumpert 59-yard touchdown run, Evan Sobiesk kick good	MSU 38–3
4	10:14	UTM	Ben Axline 31-yard touchdown pass from Jarod Neal, Jackson Redditt kick good	MSU 38–10
4	7:28	UTM	Jarod Neal 1-yard touchdown run, Jackson Redditt kick blocked	MSU 31–16
4	3:37	MSU	Jamoral Graham 44-yard touchdown pass from Damian Williams, Westin Graves kick good	MSU 45–16

=== Alabama ===
#1 Mississippi State at #5 Alabama

Team	1	2	3	4	Total
No. 1 Bulldogs	0	3	3	14	20
• No. 5 Crimson Tide	5	14	0	6	25

- Date: November 14
- Location: Bryant–Denny Stadium
  Tuscaloosa, AL
- Game start: 2:30 p.m. CST
- Elapsed time: 3:32
- Game attendance: 101,821
- Game weather: 51 °F (11 °C), Clear & Sunny, Winds South Southeast 6 MPH
- Referee: Matt Moore
- TV announcers (CBS): Verne Lundquist (Play-by-play), Gary Danielson (Color), & Allie LaForce (Sideline)

Scoring summary
1	7:49	UA	Trey DePriest safety	UA 2–0
1	2:06	UA	Adam Griffith 36 yd field goal	UA 5–0
2	7:45	UA	Amari Cooper 4 yd pass from Blake Sims. Adam Griffith kick good	UA 12–0
2	5:32	UA	Derrick Henry 1 yd run. Adam Griffith kick good	UA 19–0
2	0:03	MSU	Evan Sobiesk 23 yd field goal	UA 19–3
3	12:06	MSU	Evan Sobiesk 32 yd field goal	UA 19–6
4	14:16	MSU	Fred Ross 4 yd pass from Dak Prescott. Evan Sobiesk kick	UA 19–13
4	8:09	UA	T. J. Yeldon 7 yd run. Blake Sims pass failed	UA 25–13
4	0:15	MSU	Jameon Lewis 4 yd pass from Dak Prescott. Evan Sobiesk kick good	UA 25–20

=== Vanderbilt ===
Vanderbilt at #4 Mississippi State

Team	1	2	3	4	Total
Commodores	0	0	0	0	0
• No. 4 Bulldogs	13	24	7	7	51

- Date: November 22
- Location: Davis Wade Stadium
  Starkville, MS
- Game start: 6:30 p.m. CST
- Elapsed time: 3:19
- Game attendance: 60,493
- Game weather: 60 °F (16 °C), Partly cloudy, Winds Southeast 9 MPH
- Referee: Marc Curles
- TV announcers (SECN): Tom Hart (Play-by-play), Matt Stinchcomb (Color), & Heather Mitts (Sideline)

Scoring summary
1	8:01	MSU	Malcolm Johnson 9-yard touchdown pass from Dak Prescott, Evan Sobiesk kick failed	MSU 6–0
1	5:05	MSU	Joe Morrow 27-yard touchdown pass from Dak Prescott, Evan Sobiesk kick good	MSU 13–0
2	14:01	MSU	Christian Holmes fumble recovery 51-yard touchdown run, Evan Sobiesk kick good	MSU 20–0
2	8:27	MSU	Josh Robinson 14-yard touchdown pass from Dak Prescott, Evan Sobiesk kick good	MSU 27–0
2	2:31	MSU	Dak Prescott 4-yard touchdown run, Evan Sobiesk kick good	MSU 34–0
2	0:00	MSU	Evan Sobiesk 34-yard kick good	MSU 37–0
3	4:23	MSU	Ashton Shumpert 3-yard touchdown run, Evan Sobiesk kick good	MSU 44–0
4	14:55	MSU	Joe Morrow 9-yard touchdown pass from Damian Williams, Evan Sobiesk kick good	MSU 51–0

=== Mississippi ===
#4 Mississippi State at #18 Ole Miss

Team	1	2	3	4	Total
No. 4 Bulldogs	0	3	7	7	17
• No. 18 Rebels	7	0	17	7	31

- Date: November 29
- Location: Vaught–Hemingway Stadium
  Oxford, MS
- Game start: 2:30 p.m. CST
- Elapsed time: 3:54
- Game attendance: 62,058
- Game weather: 61 °F (16 °C), Cloudy, Winds South 7 MPH
- Referee: Tom Ritter
- TV announcers (CBS): Verne Lundquist (Play-by-play), Gary Danielson (Color), & Allie LaForce (Sideline)

=== Georgia Tech (Orange Bowl) ===
#8 Mississippi State vs. #10 Georgia Tech
(Orange Bowl)

Team	1	2	3	4	Total
No. 8 Bulldogs	0	20	0	14	34
• No. 10 Yellow Jackets	14	7	21	7	49

- Date: December 31
- Location: Sun Life Stadium
  Miami Gardens, FL
- Game start: 7:00 p.m. CST
- Elapsed time: 3:28
- Game attendance: 58,211
- Game weather: 75 °F (24 °C), Cloudy, Winds North 13 MPH
- Referee: Dan Capron
- TV announcers (ESPN/ESPN Radio): Brent Musburger (Play-by-play), Jesse Palmer (Color), & Maria Taylor (Sideline)/Bill Rosinski (Play-by-play), David Norrie (Color), & Joe Schad (Sideline)

== Rankings ==
Ranking movements Legend: ██ Increase in ranking ██ Decrease in ranking RV = Received votes ( ) = First-place votes
	Week																
Poll	Pre	1	2	3	4	5	6	7	8	9	10	11	12	13	14	15	Final
AP	RV	RV	RV	RV	14	12	3 (2)	1 (45)	1 (43)	1 (46)	1 (45)	1 (48)	4	4	10	8	11
Coaches	RV	RV	RV	RV	16	14	6	1 (26)	1 (36)	1 (41)	1 (40)	1 (41)	4	4	10	8	12
CFP	Not released									1	1	1	4	4	10	7	Not released

Following MSU's win over Auburn, the team was ranked Number 1 in the AP Poll for the first time in the program's history. That also marked "the fastest [rise to the top] in AP Top 25 history." The previous mark was six weeks by Ohio State in 1954. The Bulldogs also became the first ever team to be ranked number 1 in the newly created College Football Playoff Poll when the initial poll was released on October 28, 2014.
