= Brandon Bryant (American football) =

American football player (born 1995)

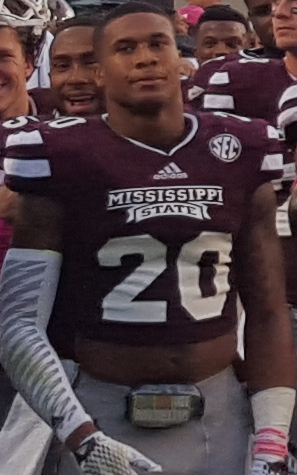
- Bryant in 2015

No. 38, 40
- Position: Safety

Personal information
- Born: December 21, 1995 (age 30); Tunica, Mississippi, U.S.
- Listed height: 6 ft 0 in (1.83 m)
- Listed weight: 215 lb (98 kg)

Career information
- High school: Rosa Fort (Tunica County, Mississippi)
- College: Mississippi State
- NFL draft: 2018: undrafted

Career history
- New York Jets (2018–2019); Hamilton Tiger-Cats (2020)
- Stats at Pro Football Reference

Brandon Ladarius Bryant (born December 21, 1995) is a former gridiron football safety. He played college football at Mississippi State.

== Early life ==
Bryant attended Rosa Fort High School in Tunica, Mississippi, where he played quarterback and safety. Bryant was rated as a three-star recruit by 247sports.com, Rivals.com, Scout.com, and ESPN. He committed to Mississippi State on November 4, 2013.

== College career ==
=== Freshman season (2015) ===
After sitting out the 2014 season as a redshirt, Bryant saw action in all 13 games in 2015, starting in eight of them.

Bryant was a backup safety for the first five games of the season before taking over starting duties in a 45–17 win over Troy, a game where he forced a fumble on Troy's first drive. The following week against Louisiana Tech, Bryant recorded his first collegiate interception and returned it for a touchdown and also recovered a blocked punt.

Later that season, on an SEC Network broadcast, Tim Tebow named Bryant the "Freak of Week," citing Bryant's ability to run a 40-yard dash in 4.24 seconds and to deadlift 600 pounds. Bryant caught another interception in a loss to Alabama.

=== Sophomore season (2016) ===
Bryant was named by The Clarion-Ledger as the Bulldogs' second-most important player in 2016. He was called the "top playmaker" on the team and the backbone of the Bulldog defense. Bryant had an interception against Samford.

=== Junior season (2017) ===
Bryant again played in all 13 games in the Bulldogs' 2017 season, bringing down an interception against in a win over BYU.

== Professional career ==
=== New York Jets ===
After failing to be drafted in the 2018 supplemental NFL draft, Bryant signed with the New York Jets as an undrafted free agent on July 16, 2018. He was waived on September 1, 2018, and was signed to the practice squad the next day. He was promoted to the active roster on December 29, 2018. He was waived/injured on August 29, 2019, and placed on the team's injured reserve list the next day. He was waived from injured reserve with an injury settlement on September 10.

=== Hamilton Tiger-Cats ===
Bryant signed with the Hamilton Tiger-Cats of the CFL on April 16, 2020. He retired from football on June 28, 2021.
