= Tunica Academy =

Segregation academy in Mississippi

Location
- Tunica, (Tunica County), Mississippi; United States; 34°40′51″N 90°23′23″W

Information
- Type: Private School, high school
- Established: 1964
- Grades: K–12
- Enrollment: 234 (2014)
- Colors: Blue, White
- Team name: Blue Devils
- Website: website

Tunica Academy is a K-12 non-denominational Christian private school located in unincorporated Tunica County, Mississippi, near Tunica. The school was founded in 1964 and has been described as a segregation academy. Tunica Academy is an accredited member of the Mississippi Private School Association.

== History ==
The school was originally established by white parents in 1964 by the name Tunica Institute of Learning as a segregation academy in response to the court ordered desegregation of Tunica public schools. The name was later changed to Tunica Academy. The first class to graduate was the class of 1970. The tuition of this school is $5200 per year. The mascot of the school is the Blue Devils.

For the 1965–1966 school year, 67% of the Tunica Academy's tuition revenue came from grants provided by the state of Mississippi. In 1969, a federal court ruled that, since, in the court's opinion, Tunica Academy would refuse to admit qualified black students, the tuition grant program violated the equal protection clause of the fourteenth amendment.

In 1969, The Clarion-Ledger reported that Tunica Academy enrolled about 225 students, or one-third of the white students in Tunica County.

In 1970, the IRS suspended the school's non-profit status due to its policies of racial discrimination.

In 1973, Tunica Academy was named in the Norwood v. Harrison decision by the US Supreme Court. The court held that any program that provides aid to schools that discriminate on the basis of race is unconstitutional. In its ruling, the high court noted that, as of 1971, Tunica Academy declined to attest to a racially non-discriminatory admissions policy.

== Demographics ==
As of 2010, 97% of the students were white. This differed from Tunica's public high school, Rosa Fort High School, where 98% were black. In 2014 there were 16 African-American students out of a total student population of 234, or 7%, while the Tunica Public Schools student body was 97% African-American.

== Notable faculty ==
- Johnny Parker, strength and conditioning coach coached linebackers at Tunica
