= Jay Hughes (American football) =

American football player (born 1991)

No. 3, 30
- Position: Safety

Personal information
- Born: November 21, 1991 (age 34)
- Listed height: 5 ft 11 in (1.80 m)
- Listed weight: 195 lb (88 kg)

Career information
- High school: Oak Grove (MS)
- College: Mississippi State
- NFL draft: 2015: undrafted

Career history
- St. Louis Rams (2015)*
- * Offseason or practice squad member only

Jay Khalil Hughes (born November 21, 1991) is an American former football safety.

Hughes played college football for Mississippi State. He injured his Achilles tendon in the first game of the 2013 season and missed the rest of the year, but returned in 2014 to play in all 13 games and serve as a team captain.
