= Benardrick McKinney =

American football player (born 1992)

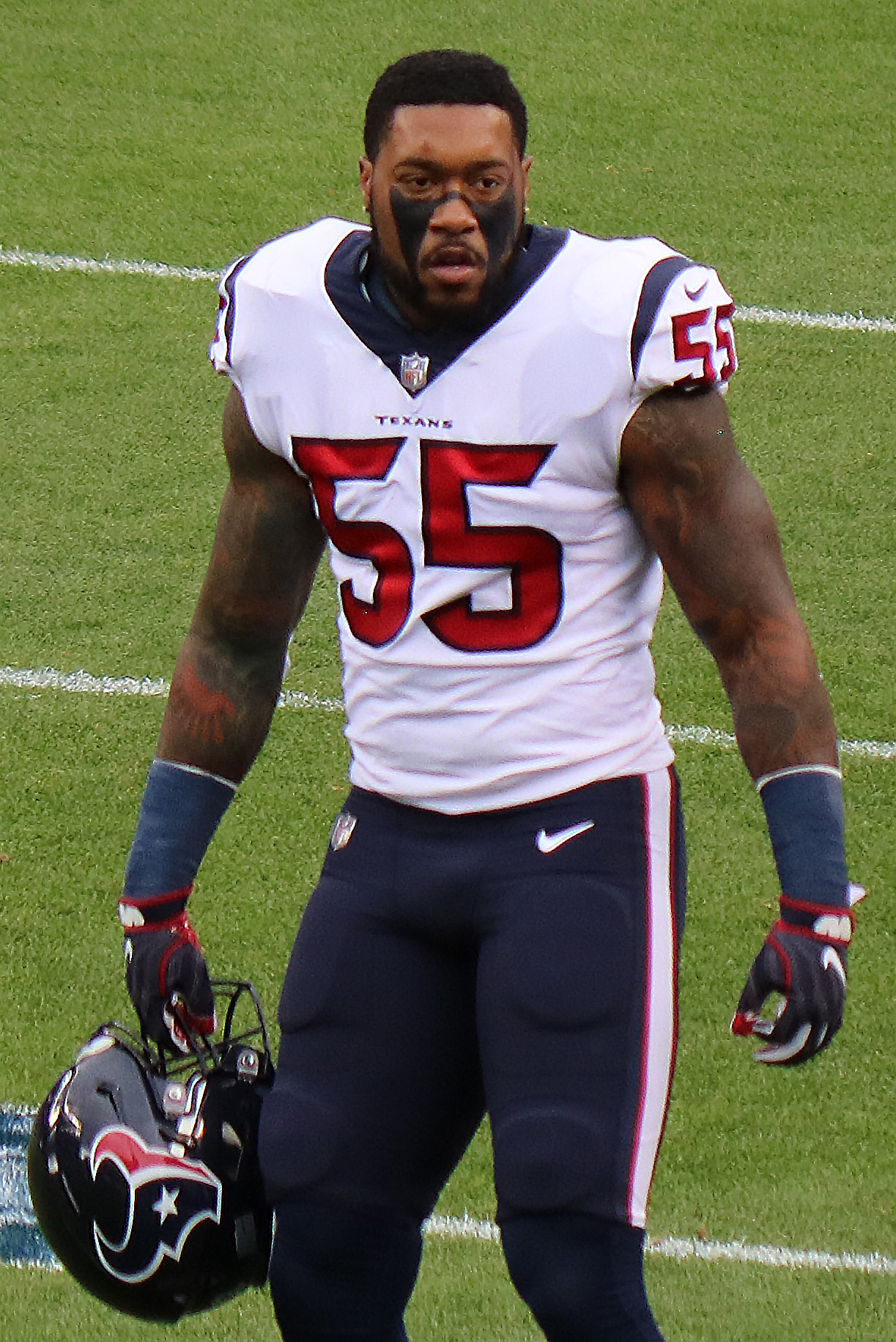
- McKinney with the Houston Texans in 2015

No. 55, 49
- Position: Linebacker

Personal information
- Born: November 19, 1992 (age 33); Tunica, Mississippi, U.S.
- Listed height: 6 ft 4 in (1.93 m)
- Listed weight: 257 lb (117 kg)

Career information
- High school: Rosa Fort (Tunica)
- College: Mississippi State
- NFL draft: 2015: 2nd round, 43rd overall pick

Career history
- Houston Texans (2015–2020); Miami Dolphins (2021)*; New York Giants (2021)
- * Offseason or practice squad member only

Awards and highlights
- Second-team All-Pro (2016); Pro Bowl (2018); First-team All-SEC (2014)

Career NFL statistics
- Total tackles: 559
- Sacks: 11.5
- Forced fumbles: 4
- Fumble recoveries: 2
- Interceptions: 1
- Stats at Pro Football Reference

Benardrick Cornelius McKinney (born November 19, 1992) is an American former professional football player who was a linebacker in the National Football League (NFL). He played college football for the Mississippi State Bulldogs and was selected by the Houston Texans in the second round of the 2015 NFL draft.

== Early life ==
A native of Tunica, Mississippi, McKinney attended Rosa Fort High School, where he played linebacker and quarterback for the varsity football team and also started for the basketball team. In his junior season, McKinney threw for 530 yards with five touchdowns and rushed for 100 yards and one score, while also serving as the team's punter. On defense, he was credited with 34 tackles on the season. As a senior, McKinney accounted for 2,036 total yards of offense and 22 touchdowns (seven on the ground and fifteen passes) with 1,334 passing and 702 yards rushing. He also almost doubled his tackle total with 66. For postseason honors, the state's high school coaches selected him to the North/South All-Star Game as a linebacker.

Regarded as a three-star recruit by 247Sports.com, McKinney was ranked as the No. 49 athlete in his class. He was recruited by Memphis, Southern Miss and Mississippi State. Eventually accepting the Bulldogs' scholarship offer, McKinney became the first Rosa Fort player to sign with an Southeastern Conference (SEC) program since 2001.

== College career ==
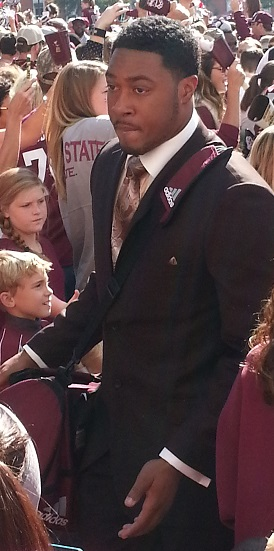
McKinney in 2014

After redshirting his initial year at Mississippi State University, McKinney played in all 13 games in the 2012 season. By the fourth game, he made the starting lineup and remained there for the rest of the season. A week later at Kentucky McKinney posted 12 tackles (10 solo), 1 tackle for loss and his first two career pass breakups, earning him Co-SEC Freshman of the Week, alongside Johnny Manziel. The week after that he recorded a season-high 14 tackles at home against Tennessee, which he tied later in a loss to Texas A&M. For the season, McKinney totalled 102 tackles, which led all SEC freshmen and tied for second among freshmen in the FBS. He earned All-SEC Freshman honors by the SEC coaches and ESPN.com, and was named a First-team Freshman All-American by CBSSports.com, FoxSportsNext, Phil Steele and CollegeFootballNews.com. As a sophomore, McKinney led the team in tackles with 71 and sacks with 3.5. As a junior, he again led the team in tackles with 71. He was named first-team All-SEC and was an All-American.

After his junior season, McKinney entered the 2015 NFL draft.

== Professional career ==
=== Pre-draft ===
Prior to his junior season, McKinney was projected as a first round selection in the 2015 draft. On January 9, 2015, McKinney announced that he had decided to forgo his senior season and enter the draft. Before the start of the pre-draft events, McKinney was ranked as the second best linebacker in the draft by NFL analyst Mike Mayock. He was one of 34 collegiate linebackers to attend the NFL Scouting Combine in Indianapolis, Indiana. McKinney completed all of the essential combine drills and finished second among all linebackers in the vertical jump, fifth in the broad jump, ninth in the short shuttle, tenth in the 40-yard dash, and tied for 11th amongst his position group in the three-cone drill. On March 4, 2015, he attended Mississippi State's pro day, but opted to stand on his combine numbers and only performed positional drills for the team representatives and scouts from 29 NFL teams, including New York Jets defensive coordinator Kacy Rodgers and New Orleans Saints assistant head coach Joe Vitt. As a highly sought after prospect, McKinney attended private visits and workouts with multiple NFL teams, including the Philadelphia Eagles, Dallas Cowboys, San Francisco 49ers, Baltimore Ravens, Miami Dolphins, Carolina Panthers, Cleveland Browns, Denver Broncos, Saints, Chicago Bears, and Minnesota Vikings. At the conclusion of the pre-draft process, McKinney was projected to be a second round pick by draft experts and scouts. He was ranked the third best linebacker in the draft by NFL analyst Lance Zierlein, was ranked the fourth best linebacker by Sports Illustrated, was ranked the fifth best inside linebacker by Charles Davis, and was ranked the fifth best linebacker in the draft by NFL analyst Mike Mayock.

Pre-draft measurables
Height	Weight	Arm length	Hand span	Wingspan	40-yard dash	10-yard split	20-yard split	20-yard shuttle	Three-cone drill	Vertical jump	Broad jump	Bench press
6 ft 4 1/8 in (1.93 m)	246 lb (112 kg)	33 in (0.84 m)	9 in (0.23 m)	6 ft 8 1/8 in (2.04 m)	4.66 s	1.63 s	2.73 s	4.27 s	7.21 s	40.5 in (1.03 m)	10 ft 1 in (3.07 m)	16 reps
All values from NFL Combine

=== Houston Texans ===
==== 2015 ====
The Houston Texans selected McKinney in the second round (43rd overall) of the 2015 draft. The Texans traded to the Browns their second (51st overall), fourth (116th overall), and sixth round (195th overall) picks in the 2015 draft to move up and draft McKinney after receiving the Browns' second (43rd overall) and seventh round (229th overall) picks. He was the fourth linebacker selected in 2015. On May 8, 2015, the Texans signed McKinney to a four-year, $5.34 million contract that includes $2.82 million guaranteed and a signing bonus of $2.14 million.

He entered training camp competing against veterans Akeem Dent, Mike Mohamed, and Jeff Tarpinian for a job as a starting inside linebacker. Head coach Bill O'Brien named McKinney the backup inside linebacker behind Brian Cushing and Akeem Dent to start the regular season.

He made his professional regular season debut in the Texans' season-opener against the Kansas City Chiefs and recorded one solo tackle in their 27–20 loss. In Week 3, McKinney earned his first career start after head coach Bill O'Brien opted to start the rookie over Akeem Dent. He recorded four combined tackles in the Texans' 19–9 win against the Tampa Bay Buccaneers. On October 18, 2015, he made his third career start and recorded three combined tackles during a 31–20 victory at the Jacksonville Jaguars. He left the game in the third quarter after sustaining a concussion and missed the next two games (Weeks 7–8). In Week 14, McKinney made a season-high ten combined tackles during a 27–6 loss to the New England Patriots. The following week, he recorded seven combined tackles and made his first career sack on Andrew Luck in the Texans' 16–10 win at the Indianapolis Colts. He finished his rookie season with 63 combined tackles (37 solo) and one sack in 14 games and 11 starts.

The Texans finished first in the AFC South with a 9–7 record and received a playoff berth. On January 9, 2016, McKinney started his first career playoff game and recorded nine combined tackles as the Texans were routed 30–0 by the Kansas City Chiefs in the AFC wildcard game.

==== 2016 ====
McKinney was slated as the starting inside linebacker heading into the regular season along with Brian Cushing and outside linebackers Jadeveon Clowney and Whitney Mercilus. On September 22, 2016, McKinney recorded a career-high 16 combined tackles (ten solo) and a sack on Jacoby Brissett as the Texans were routed by the Patriots 27–0. The following week, he collected nine combined tackles and forced the first fumble of his career in a 27–20 win against the Tennessee Titans. On October 15, 2016, McKinney recorded 12 combined tackles and a sack during a 26–23 win against the Colts. McKinney was awarded second-team All-Pro after finishing the regular season as the only inside linebacker in the NFL with at least 100 tackles and five sacks. He finished the season with a total of 129 combined tackles (79 solo), five sacks, and two pass deflections in 16 games and 16 starts. Pro Football Focus gave McKinney an overall grade of 81.0 in 2016.

For the second consecutive year, the Texans finished first in their division with a 9–7 record and made it to the playoffs. On January 7, 2017, the Texans played the Oakland Raiders in the AFC wild card game and McKinney recorded seven tackles in a 27–14 victory. They were eliminated from the playoffs the following week after being defeated by the eventual Super Bowl LI Champions, the Patriots in the AFC Divisional Round.

==== 2017 ====
McKinney returned as the Texans' starting inside linebacker under new defensive coordinator Mike Vrabel. He started the Texans' season-opener against the Jaguars and recorded a season-high 11 combined tackles and a forced fumble during a 29–7 loss. The following week, McKinney collected six combined tackles and sacked quarterback Andy Dalton twice in the Texans' 13–9 win at the Cincinnati Bengals. In Week 11, he made a season-high tying seven solo tackle and an assisted tackle as the Texans defeated the Arizona Cardinals 31–21. McKinney finished his third season in 2017 with 95 combined tackles (62 solo), three sacks, and a pass deflection in 16 games and 16 starts. Pro Football Focus gave McKinney an overall grade of 79.7, which ranked him 24th among all qualifying linebackers.

==== 2018 ====
On June 14, 2018, McKinney signed a five-year, $50 million contract extension with the Texans with $21 million guaranteed.

==== 2019 ====
In week 6 against the Chiefs, McKinney recovered a fumble by Patrick Mahomes in the 31–24 win.

==== 2020 ====
On October 13, 2020, McKinney was placed on season-ending injured reserve with a shoulder injury.

=== Miami Dolphins ===
On March 17, 2021, McKinney and a 2021 seventh-round pick was traded to the Dolphins in exchange for defensive end Shaq Lawson and a 2021 sixth-round pick. He was released before the season on August 31.

=== New York Giants ===
On October 19, 2021, McKinney was signed to the practice squad of the New York Giants. On October 23, McKinney was elevated from the practice to the active roster a few times, once was when he was activated off the practice squad as a COVID-19 replacement. McKinney was signed to the active roster for the remainder of the season starting November 17th.

== NFL career statistics ==
Legend
**Bold**	Career high

=== Regular season ===
Year	Team	Games		Tackles					Interceptions					Fumbles			
Year	Team	GP	GS	Cmb	Solo	Ast	Sck	TFL	Int	Yds	TD	Lng	PD	FF	FR	Yds	TD
2015	HOU	14	11	63	37	26	1.0	7	0	0	0	0	0	0	0	0	0
2016	HOU	**16**	**16**	**129**	**79**	**50**	**5.0**	8	0	0	0	0	2	**1**	0	0	0
2017	HOU	**16**	**16**	95	62	33	3.0	**10**	0	0	0	0	1	**1**	0	0	0
2018	HOU	**16**	**16**	105	63	42	1.5	5	**1**	0	0	0	**7**	**1**	0	0	0
2019	HOU	14	14	101	54	47	1.0	4	0	0	0	0	3	**1**	**2**	**1**	0
2020	HOU	4	4	37	19	18	0.0	1	0	0	0	0	1	0	0	0	0
2021	NYG	11	3	29	17	12	0.0	1	0	0	0	0	0	0	0	0	0
		91	80	559	331	228	11.5	36	1	0	0	0	14	4	2	1	0

=== Playoffs ===
Year	Team	Games		Tackles					Interceptions					Fumbles			
Year	Team	GP	GS	Cmb	Solo	Ast	Sck	TFL	Int	Yds	TD	Lng	PD	FF	FR	Yds	TD
2015	HOU	1	1	9	4	5	0.0	0	0	0	0	0	0	0	0	0	0
2016	HOU	**2**	**2**	12	6	**6**	0.0	0	0	0	0	0	**2**	0	0	0	0
2018	HOU	1	1	9	5	4	0.0	0	0	0	0	0	0	0	0	0	0
2019	HOU	**2**	**2**	**14**	**8**	**6**	0.0	0	0	0	0	0	0	0	0	0	0
		6	6	44	23	21	0.0	0	0	0	0	0	2	0	0	0	0
