= North Tunica, Mississippi =

- CDP
- Location of North Tunica, Mississippi

- Location in the United States
- Coordinates: 34°42′08″N 90°22′36″W
- Country: United States
- State: Mississippi
- County: Tunica

Area
  - Total: 0.57 sq mi (1.47 km^{2})
  - Land: 0.57 sq mi (1.47 km^{2})
  - Water: 0 sq mi (0.00 km^{2})
- Elevation: 194 ft (59 m)

Population (2020)
  - Total: 760
  - Density: 1,340.8/sq mi (517.68/km^{2})
- Time zone: UTC-6 (Central (CST))
  - Summer (DST): UTC-5 (CDT)
- ZIP code: 38676
- Area code: 662
- FIPS code: 28-52680
- GNIS feature ID: 2403355

North Tunica is a census-designated place (CDP) in Tunica County, Mississippi. As of the 2020 census, North Tunica had a population of 760.

== Geography ==
According to the United States Census Bureau, the CDP has a total area of 0.7 square miles (1.8 km^{2}), all land.

== Demographics ==
Historical population
Census	Pop.	Note	%±
2000	1,450		—
2010	1,035		−28.6%
2020	760		−26.6%
U.S. Decennial Census

=== Racial and ethnic composition ===
North Tunica CDP, Mississippi – Racial and ethnic composition Note: the US Census treats Hispanic/Latino as an ethnic category. This table excludes Latinos from the racial categories and assigns them to a separate category. Hispanics/Latinos may be of any race.
Race / Ethnicity (NH = Non-Hispanic)	Pop 2000	Pop 2010	Pop 2020	% 2000	% 2010	% 2020
White alone (NH)	68	44	32	4.69%	4.25%	4.21%
Black or African American alone (NH)	1,371	987	688	94.55%	95.36%	90.53%
Native American or Alaska Native alone (NH)	0	0	4	0.00%	0.00%	0.53%
Asian alone (NH)	3	0	0	0.21%	0.00%	0.00%
Native Hawaiian or Pacific Islander alone (NH)	0	0	0	0.00%	0.00%	0.00%
Other race alone (NH)	0	0	3	0.00%	0.00%	0.39%
Mixed race or Multiracial (NH)	2	2	17	0.14%	0.19%	2.24%
Hispanic or Latino (any race)	6	2	16	0.41%	0.19%	2.11%
Total	1,450	1,035	760	100.00%	100.00%	100.00%

=== 2020 census ===
As of the 2020 United States census, there were 760 people, 281 households, and 181 families residing in the CDP.

=== 2000 census ===
As of the census of 2000, there were 1,450 people, 425 households, and 333 families residing in the CDP. The population density was 2,014.7 inhabitants per square mile (777.9/km^{2}). There were 449 housing units at an average density of 623.9 per square mile (240.9/km^{2}). The racial makeup of the CDP was 4.69% White, 94.90% African American, 0.21% Asian, and 0.21% from two or more races. Hispanic or Latino of any race were 0.41% of the population.

There were 425 households, out of which 40.5% had children under the age of 18 living with them, 26.4% were married couples living together, 46.6% had a female householder with no husband present, and 21.6% were non-families. 19.5% of all households were made up of individuals, and 9.6% had someone living alone who was 65 years of age or older. The average household size was 3.29 and the average family size was 3.76.

In the CDP, the population was spread out, with 36.4% under the age of 18, 13.6% from 18 to 24, 25.2% from 25 to 44, 15.8% from 45 to 64, and 9.0% who were 65 years of age or older. The median age was 25 years. For every 100 females, there were 82.6 males. For every 100 females age 18 and over, there were 75.3 males.

The median income for a household in the CDP was $14,891, and the median income for a family was $16,466. Males had a median income of $16,250 versus $16,985 for females. The per capita income for the CDP was $6,972. About 45.5% of families and 50.7% of the population were below the poverty line, including 60.1% of those under age 18 and 31.4% of those age 65 or over.

== Education ==
North Tunica is served by the Tunica County School District. Rosa Fort High School is the comprehensive high school of the district.
