= Tunica, Mississippi =

- Town
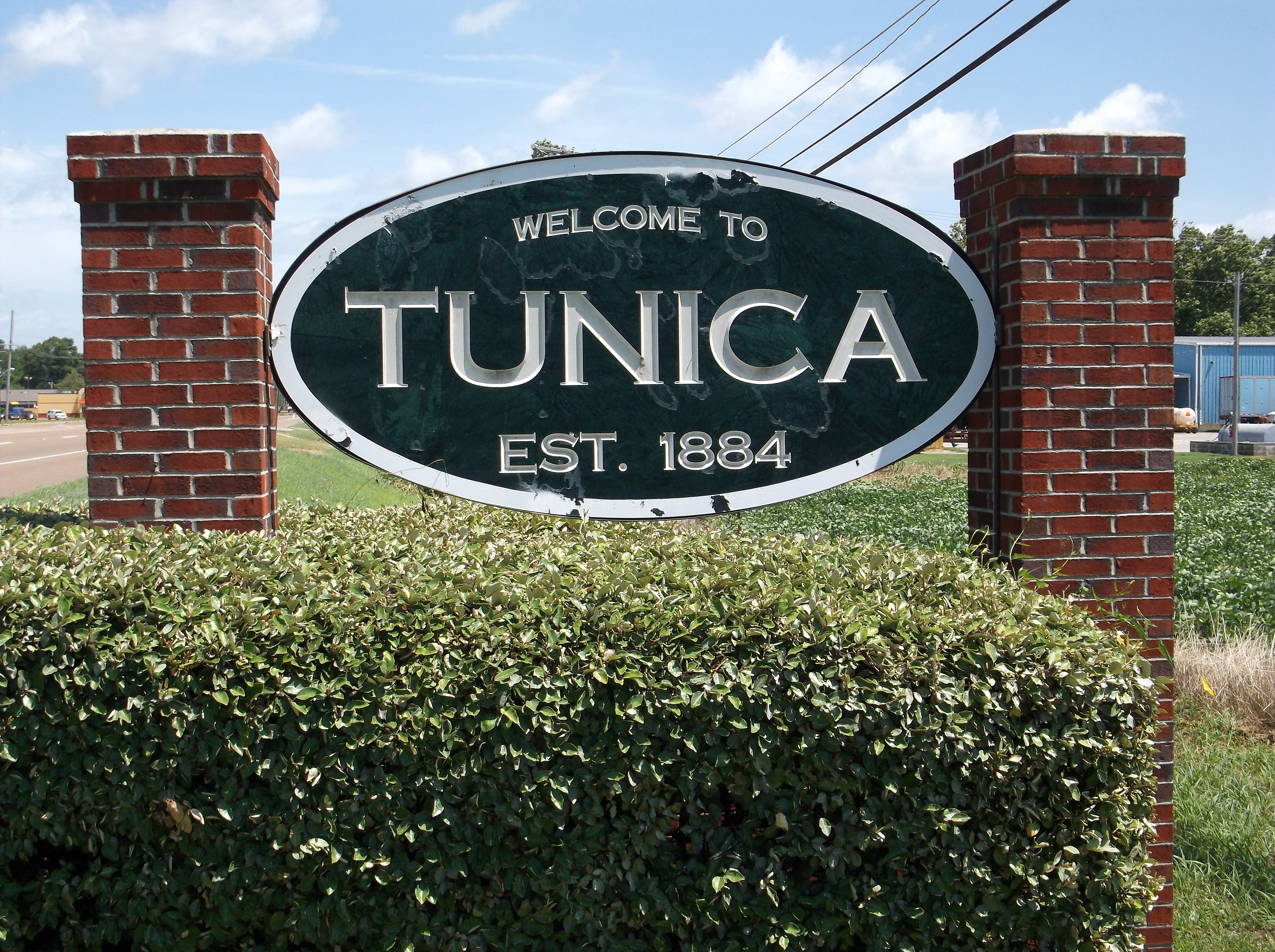
- Welcome sign in Tunica located on US Highway 61

- Location of Tunica in Tunica County

- Location in the United States
- Coordinates: 34°41′18″N 90°22′40″W
- Country: United States
- State: Mississippi
- County: Tunica
- Incorporated: 1884

Area
  - Total: 0.66 sq mi (1.72 km^{2})
  - Land: 0.66 sq mi (1.72 km^{2})
  - Water: 0 sq mi (0.00 km^{2})
- Elevation: 194 ft (59 m)

Population (2020)
  - Total: 1,026
  - Density: 1,545.9/sq mi (596.88/km^{2})
- Time zone: UTC−6 (CST)
  - Summer (DST): UTC−5 (CDT)
- ZIP code: 38676
- Area code: 662
- FIPS code: 28-74760
- GNIS feature ID: 2406764
- Website: townoftunica.com

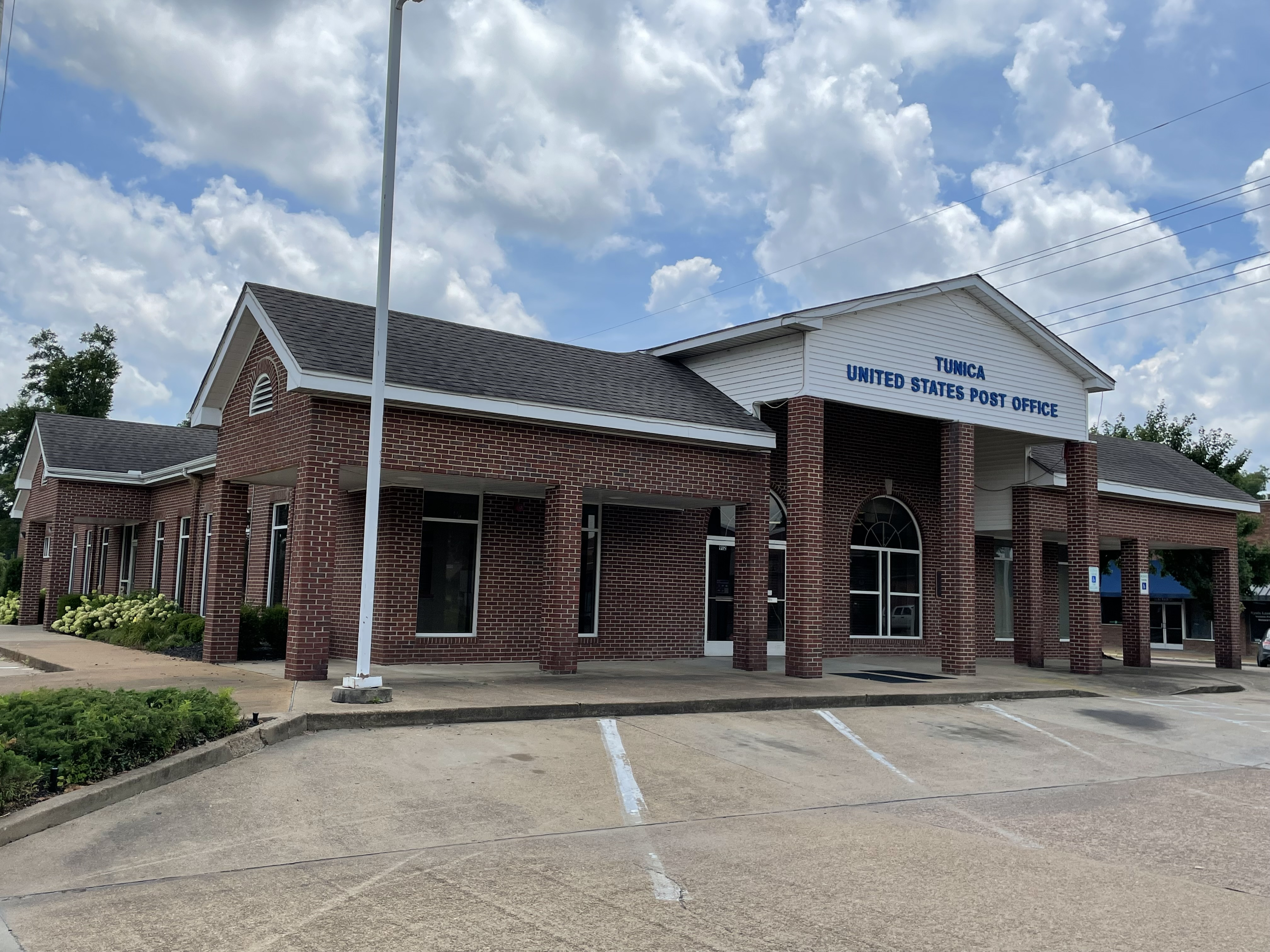
Post office in Tunica, Mississippi.

Tunica is a town in and the county seat of Tunica County, Mississippi, United States, near the Mississippi River. As of the 2020 census, Tunica had a population of 1,026. Until the early 1990s when casino gambling was introduced in the area, Tunica had been one of the most impoverished places in the United States. Despite this economic improvement, Tunica's population continues to decline from its peak in 1970.

== History ==
The community derives its name from the Tunica Indians which once were numerous in the area. Tunica is the fourth community to serve as county seat of Tunica County, succeeding earlier county seats at Commerce (1839–1842, 1842–1847), Peyton (1842, temporary) and Austin (1847–1888).

Tunica gained national attention for its deprived neighborhood known as "Sugar Ditch Alley", named for the open sewer located there. Its fortunes have improved since development of a gambling resort area nearby during the early 1990s. While population growth has taken place mostly outside Tunica, the major casinos employ numerous locals. They attract visitors from nearby Memphis, Tennessee, West Memphis, Arkansas and all over the Southeastern United States.

== Geography ==
Tunica is located approximately 20 miles (32 km) south of Downtown Memphis, Tennessee.

According to the United States Census Bureau, the town has a total area of 0.7 square miles (1.8 km^{2}), all land.

Climate data for Tunica, Mississippi (1991–2020 normals, extremes 1959–2019)
Month	Jan	Feb	Mar	Apr	May	Jun	Jul	Aug	Sep	Oct	Nov	Dec	Year
Record high °F (°C)	78 (26)	81 (27)	86 (30)	94 (34)	98 (37)	101 (38)	105 (41)	106 (41)	106 (41)	96 (36)	86 (30)	80 (27)	106 (41)
Mean daily maximum °F (°C)	49.2 (9.6)	53.7 (12.1)	62.9 (17.2)	72.8 (22.7)	81.6 (27.6)	89.0 (31.7)	91.3 (32.9)	90.9 (32.7)	86.1 (30.1)	75.4 (24.1)	62.5 (16.9)	52.3 (11.3)	72.3 (22.4)
Daily mean °F (°C)	40.8 (4.9)	44.8 (7.1)	53.5 (11.9)	62.8 (17.1)	72.1 (22.3)	79.6 (26.4)	82.1 (27.8)	80.9 (27.2)	75.3 (24.1)	64.0 (17.8)	52.4 (11.3)	43.9 (6.6)	62.7 (17.1)
Mean daily minimum °F (°C)	32.5 (0.3)	35.9 (2.2)	44.2 (6.8)	52.8 (11.6)	62.5 (16.9)	70.1 (21.2)	72.9 (22.7)	71.0 (21.7)	64.5 (18.1)	52.6 (11.4)	42.4 (5.8)	35.4 (1.9)	53.1 (11.7)
Record low °F (°C)	−5 (−21)	2 (−17)	7 (−14)	27 (−3)	37 (3)	46 (8)	53 (12)	50 (10)	37 (3)	27 (−3)	15 (−9)	−10 (−23)	−10 (−23)
Average precipitation inches (mm)	4.65 (118)	4.95 (126)	5.80 (147)	6.02 (153)	6.00 (152)	4.28 (109)	4.01 (102)	3.15 (80)	3.33 (85)	3.86 (98)	4.80 (122)	5.66 (144)	56.51 (1,435)
Average snowfall inches (cm)	0.4 (1.0)	0.5 (1.3)	0.1 (0.25)	0.0 (0.0)	0.0 (0.0)	0.0 (0.0)	0.0 (0.0)	0.0 (0.0)	0.0 (0.0)	0.0 (0.0)	0.1 (0.25)	0.0 (0.0)	1.1 (2.8)
Average precipitation days (≥ 0.01 in)	10.4	8.6	10.7	9.2	10.6	8.1	7.9	6.9	6.6	7.4	9.2	10.7	106.3
Average snowy days (≥ 0.1 in)	0.3	0.3	0.0	0.0	0.0	0.0	0.0	0.0	0.0	0.0	0.1	0.0	0.7
Source: NOAA

== Demographics ==
Historical population
Census	Pop.	Note	%±
1890	198		—
1900	485		144.9%
1910	555		14.4%
1920	955		72.1%
1930	1,043		9.2%
1940	1,322		26.7%
1950	1,354		2.4%
1960	1,445		6.7%
1970	1,685		16.6%
1980	1,361		−19.2%
1990	1,175		−13.7%
2000	1,132		−3.7%
2010	1,030		−9.0%
2020	1,026		−0.4%
U.S. Decennial Census

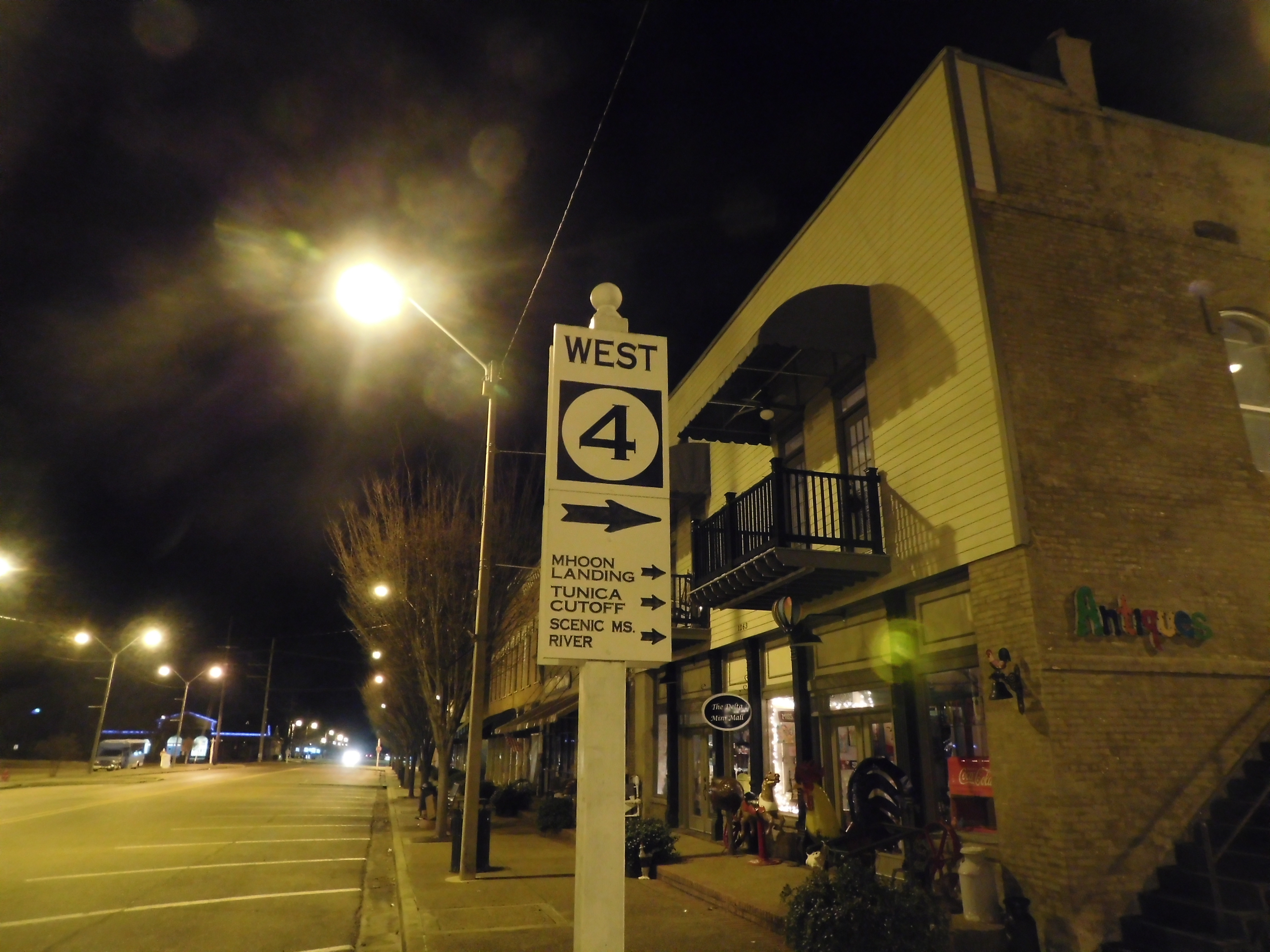
Main Street in Tunica

=== 2020 census ===
Tunica Racial Composition
Race	Num.	Perc.
White	602	58.67%
Black or African American	345	33.63%
Asian	5	0.49%
Other/Mixed	33	3.22%
Hispanic or Latino	41	4.0%

As of the 2020 United States census, there were 1,026 people, 501 households, and 293 families residing in the town.

=== 2000 census ===
As of the census of 2000, there were 1,132 people, 537 households, and 254 families residing in the town. The population density was 1,588.4 inhabitants per square mile (613.3/km^{2}). There were 592 housing units at an average density of 830.7 per square mile (320.7/km^{2}). The racial makeup of the town was 67.84% White, 29.42% African American, 0.27% Native American, 1.06% Asian, 0.88% from other races, and 0.53% from two or more races. Hispanic or Latino of any race were 2.30% of the population.

There were 537 households, of which 18.4% had children under the age of 18 living with them, 34.3% were married couples living together, 11.2% had a female householder with no husband present, and 52.7% were non-families. Of all households, 48.0% were made up of individuals, and 26.4% had someone living alone who was 65 years of age or older. The average household size was 2.01 and the average family size was 2.94.

In the town, the population was spread out, with 18.9% under the age of 18, 6.1% from 18 to 24, 23.4% from 25 to 44, 28.3% from 45 to 64, and 23.3% who were 65 years of age or older. The median age was 46 years. For every 100 females, there were 87.7 males. For every 100 females age 18 and over, there were 80.0 males.

The median income for a household in the town was $26,607, and the median income for a family was $54,583. Males had a median income of $30,208 versus $22,250 for females. The per capita income for the town was $20,114. About 17.1% of families and 25.5% of the population were below the poverty line, including 33.3% of those under age 18 and 21.3% of those age 65 or over.

== Casino economy ==
Casino gambling's effect on the local economy has spurred population growth in unincorporated parts of the county outside Tunica proper. Since 1990, the town's name has been popularly associated with several casinos located near the Mississippi River. However, the current group of casinos is located in the community of Tunica Resorts, 10 miles north of the town of Tunica, and extending to the DeSoto County line.

Tunica Resorts was originally named "Robinsonville", but the name was changed in 2005 to eliminate confusion over the location of the casinos, which have always used the name "Tunica" as an identifier. The success of these gaming houses in northern Tunica County came at the expense of the area's first group of casinos in the early 1990s, located just northwest of Tunica proper, in an area known as Mhoon Landing. This now comprises the current census-designated place of North Tunica. These casinos were closed or moved as larger resorts opened closer to Memphis to attract its larger residential base.

Unlike the area including casinos along Mississippi's Gulf Coast region, Tunica was not in the path of Hurricane Katrina. As a result, some of the regular Gulf Coast customer traffic from casinos drifted northward to Tunica County while repairs and reconstruction were underway in the Gulf Coast locations.

Though the casinos lie outside the town limits, the benefits of tax revenue generated have also aided the town. Major improvements to the public school system and downtown district are among the most visible aspects. Long-term effects include major highway improvements on U.S. Route 61 and a much-discussed potential expansion of Tunica Municipal Airport.

As of 2007, some Tunica Resorts residents are trying to incorporate their community as a separate town government, rather than operate under the jurisdiction of Tunica County or be annexed into the town of Tunica. If Tunica Resorts incorporates, the new town government would directly benefit from casino tax revenue, enabling construction of municipal government offices. Depending on population and revenue growth, fire and police stations, libraries and other public infrastructure could be other likely additions.

== Education ==
The Town of Tunica is served by the Tunica County School District. Zoned schools include Tunica Elementary School, Tunica Middle School, and Rosa Fort High School.

Tunica Academy is located in an unincorporated area in Tunica County, near Tunica.

== In popular culture ==
Tunica is mentioned in Elmore Leonard's 2002 novel Tishomingo Blues.

== Notable people ==
- Brandon Bryant, NFL Player
- James Cotton, blues harmonica player
- Parker Hall, 1939 Most Valuable Player of the National Football League
- Charlaine Harris, New York Times bestselling author
- Donald Hawkins, NFL Player
- Benardrick McKinney, NFL linebacker

== Transportation ==
Tunica Municipal Airport has had airline service intermittently with aircraft such as Boeing 727 jets of Pan Am Clipper Connection and Boeing 737 jets of Air Tran offering commercial services. The closest airport with continuous airline service is Memphis International Airport in Memphis, Tennessee, which is about 30 minutes away by car.

== See also ==
- Tunica Resorts, Mississippi
