= Big Jack Johnson =

American blues guitarist and mandolin player (1940–2011)

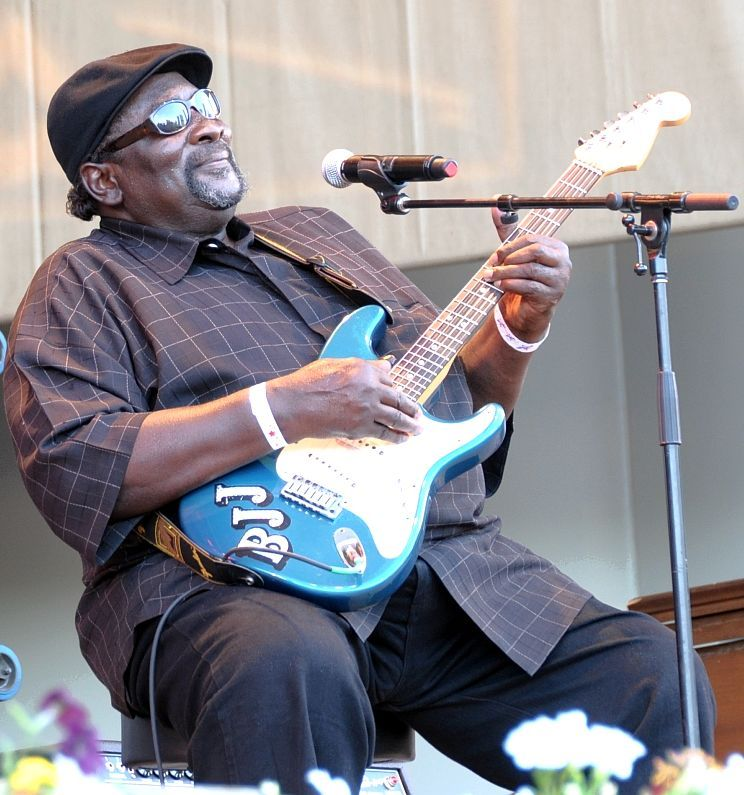
- Johnson performing at the Chicago Blues Festival, 2009

Background information
- Born: Jack N. Johnson; July 30, 1940; Lambert, Mississippi, United States
- Died: March 14, 2011 (aged 70) Memphis, Tennessee, United States
- Genres: Delta blues, country blues, electric blues
- Occupations: Musician, singer, songwriter
- Instruments: Guitar, mandolin, bass, vocals
- Years active: 1960–2011
- Labels: Earwig Music, various
- Formerly of: Jelly Roll Kings, Big Jack Johnson and the Oilers

Jack N. Johnson, known as Big Jack Johnson (July 30, 1939 or 1940 – March 14, 2011) was an American electric blues musician, one of the "present-day exponents of an edgier, electrified version of the raw, uncut Delta blues sound." He was one of a small number of blues musicians who played the mandolin. He won a W. C. Handy Award in 2003 for best acoustic blues album.

== Biography ==
Johnson was born in Lambert, Mississippi, in 1940, one of 18 children in his family. His father, Ellis Johnson, was a sharecropper, and his family picked cotton, but he was also a working musician, leading a band at local functions and playing fiddle and mandolin in country and blues styles. Big Jack got his start in music playing with his father. In his teens, he began playing the electric guitar, attracted to the urban sound of B.B. King.

Johnson was nicknamed "The Oil Man", because of his day job as a truck driver for Shell Oil. He was the father of 13 children.

His earliest professional playing, apart from his father's band, was with Earnest Roy, Sr., C. V. Veal & the Shufflers, and Johnny Dugan & the Esquires.

In 1962, Johnson, Sam Carr and Frank Frost formed the Jelly Roll Kings and the Nighthawks, in which Johnson played bass, releasing two albums, Hey Boss Man (1962) and My Back Scratcher (1966). Johnson's first recordings as a vocalist are on the 1979 album Rockin' the Juke Joint Down, issued by Earwig Music. With Frost as the bandleader, they performed and recorded together for 15 years.

Johnson's first solo album, The Oil Man, including the song "Catfish Blues", was released by Earwig in 1987. He recorded solo and as a member of the Jelly Roll Kings and Big Jack Johnson and the Oilers (with the poet and musician Dick Lourie).

He wrote and performed "Jack's Blues" and performed "Catfish Medley" with Samuel L. Jackson on the soundtrack of the film Black Snake Moan. His album Daddy, When Is Mama Comin Home? (1990) presents social concerns.

He subsequently performed and recorded with his band, the Cornlickers, with Dale Wise on drums, Dave Groninger on guitar, Tony Ryder on bass, and Bobby Gentilo on guitar. They recorded the albums Katrina (2009) and Big Jack's Way (2012).

Johnson died from an undisclosed illness on March 14, 2011. According to family members, he had struggled with health problems in his final years, worsening to the point that there were erroneous reports of his death in the days leading up to it.

Johnson was posthumously honored with a plaque on the Clarksdale Walk of Fame in August 2011. He also has a marker on the Mississippi Blues Trail in Clarksdale.

== Partial discography ==
- The Oil Man (1987)
- Rooster Blues (1987)
- Daddy, When Is Mama Comin Home? (1991)
- We Got to Stop This Killin' (1996)
- Live in Chicago (1997)
- All the Way Back* (1998)
- Live in Chicago* (1998)
- Roots Stew* (2000)
- The Memphis Barbecue Sessions (2002)
- Black Snake Moan (2007)
- Juke Joint Saturday Night Live (2008)
- Katrina (2009)
- Big Jack's Way (2010)
- Stripped Down in Memphis with Kim Wilson and Wild Child Butler (2022)

== Filmography ==
- The Jewish Cowboys (2003) (TV)
- Deep Blues: A Musical Pilgrimage to the Crossroads (1992)

== See also ==
- List of Delta blues musicians
- List of electric blues musicians
- List of blues mandolinists
