= The Jelly Roll Kings =

US musical group

The Jelly Roll Kings were an American electric Delta blues band. The members of the band were Frank Frost (keyboard/harmonica), Big Jack Johnson (guitar) and Sam Carr (drums). Some of their most well-known songs included "The Jelly Roll King", and "Catfish Blues".

== Career ==
The three had been playing together irregularly from 1962 and into the 1970s under the name The Nighthawks. In 1979, they were invited by Michael Frank to record now as The Jelly Roll Kings; their debut album, Rockin' the Juke Joint Down, was the debut release of the Earwig Music Company. In the following years they kept performing separately, but were recorded again. Fat Possum Records released the Kings 1997 follow-up, Off Yonder Wall. It was produced by Robert Palmer, and included tracks such as "That's Alright Mama" and "Baby, Please Don't Go."

Frank Frost died in 1999, Sam Carr followed in 2009, and Big Jack Johnson in 2011.

== Discography ==
- Rockin' the Juke Joint Down (1979), Earwig
- Off Yonder Wall (1997), Fat Possum
