= Sam Carr (musician) =

American blues drummer (1926–2009)

- Born: Samuel Lee McCollum; April 17, 1926; Marvell, Arkansas, U.S.
- Died: September 21, 2009 (aged 83) Clarksdale, Mississippi, U.S.
- Genre: Blues
- Occupation: Drummer
- Years active: 1940s–2009
- Formerly of: The Jelly Roll Kings

Sam Carr (born Samuel Lee McCollum, April 17, 1926 – September 21, 2009) was an American blues drummer best known as a member of the Jelly Roll Kings.

Largely self-taught, Carr was noted for his "minimalist" three-piece drum kit, consisting of a snare drum, a bass drum, and a high-hat cymbal.

== Early life ==
Born near Marvell, Arkansas, McCollum was adopted as a toddler by the Carr family and raised on their farm near Dundee, Mississippi. He took their surname.

At 16, Carr returned to Arkansas, where he played bass for his biological father, Robert Nighthawk, an established blues musician, and also worked as a chauffeur. He married Doris in 1946, and they began sharecropping in Helena, Arkansas. He was involved in a dispute over a borrowed mule team with the plantation owner, who attempted to beat him. Carr later stated, "I wasn't going to let him whoop me, that was plumb out of the question. From that day on, white people called me crazy."

The Carrs moved to Chicago and then St. Louis to live with Carr's biological mother. In St. Louis, Carr began playing bass guitar with the harmonica player Tree Top Slim. Carr formed his own band, Little Sam Carr and the Blue Kings, which initially featured Nighthawk's second wife, Early Bea, on drums, until Carr decided to take on that role. The band played mostly in "low-class clubs" in poor neighborhoods of St. Louis.

In 1956, Carr began working regularly with Frank Frost, who played the harmonica and guitar.

== The Jelly Roll Kings ==
In 1962, the Carrs and Frost moved to Mississippi, where they joined with Clarksdale-based guitarist Big Jack Johnson to form the Jelly Roll Kings. Doris sang with the band for several years. They recorded the album Hey Boss Man for Phillips International Records in 1962. The album included the song "Jelly Roll King" (the origin of the band's name), a classic electric juke joint blues. The band had a minor hit with "My Back Scratcher" in 1966. The Jelly Roll Kings performed through the 1960s and 1970s. Carr, living in Lula, Mississippi, also worked locally as a tractor driver. In the mid-1970s, the band released the LP Rockin' the Juke Joint Down on the Earwig label.

Carr and Frost were featured with guitarist Ry Cooder on the soundtrack of the 1986 movie Crossroads.

The trio reunited on various occasion, producing the albums Midnight Prowler (1988), Daddy When Is Mama Comin' Home (1991), and Yonder Wall (1996). They also contributed to the PBS documentary River of Song in 1996.

== Later career ==
Carr contributed his unique drumming to albums by numerous blues musicians, including T-Model Ford, Asie Payton, Robert Walker, Paul "Wine" Jones, Lonnie Shields, Sonny Boy Williamson II, Floyd Lee & His Mean Blues Band, David "Honeyboy" Edwards, and Buddy Guy.

In his later years, Carr led his own group, the Delta Jukes, often working with Dave Riley on guitar and vocals. The group recorded several albums, including Working for the Blues (2002), Down in the Delta (2004), and Let the Good Times Roll (2007).

Carr was featured in film and television documentaries about Mississippi blues, including The Blues: Feel Like Going Home (2003), directed by Martin Scorsese and the award winning Full Moon Lightnin' (2008), by filmmaker John C. Gardiner.

== Honors ==
In 2007, Carr received a Heritage Award from Mississippi Governor Haley Barbour at the Governor's Awards for Excellence in the Arts ceremony in Jackson. He also received awards from Living Blues magazine. Carr is mentioned on several Mississippi Blues Trail historical markers.

== Death ==
In 2009, Carr died in a nursing home Clarksdale of congestive heart failure at age 83.
