= Frank Frost =

American blues harmonica player (c. 1936–1999)

Background information
- Born: Frank Otis Frost; April 15, 1936 (or 1938); Auvergne, Jackson County, Arkansas, United States
- Died: October 12, 1999 (aged 63) Helena, Arkansas, U.S.
- Genres: Blues
- Instrument: Harmonica

Frank Otis Frost (April 15, 1936 or 1938 – October 12, 1999) was one of the foremost American Delta blues harmonica players of his generation.

== Life and career ==
Most sources state that Frost was born in 1936 in Auvergne, Jackson County, Arkansas, though researchers Bob Eagle and Eric LeBlanc state Patterson, Woodruff County, in 1938. Frost began his musical career at a young age by playing the piano for his family church. At the age of 15, Frost left for St. Louis, where he became a guitarist. At the age of 18, Frost began touring with drummer Sam Carr and Carr's father, Robert Nighthawk. Soon after touring, he toured again with Sonny Boy Williamson II for several years, who helped teach him how to play the harmonica.

While playing with guitarist Big Jack Johnson, Frost attracted the interest of the record producer Sam Phillips, founder of Sun Records. Some recordings of note that followed included "Hey Boss Man" and "My Back Scratcher". Frost also recorded for the Jewel label, four years later. The Sun Records and Jewel Records material was re-released on one CD by Charly Records of London, England.

Album cover of Hey Boss Man

In the late 1970s, Frost was re-discovered by a blues enthusiast, Michael Frank, who began releasing albums on his Earwig Music Company label by the trio, now called The Jelly Roll Kings, after a song from their album, Hey Boss Man.

Frost appeared in the films Deep Blues: A Musical Pilgrimage to the Crossroads and Crossroads.

In later years, Frost's health declined, yet he continued to play. Four days before his death, he appeared with Carr at the King Biscuit Blues Festival. He died of cardiac arrest in Helena, Arkansas in 1999, and is buried in Magnolia Cemetery in Helena.
