= Tunica County School District =

School district in Mississippi

The Tunica County School District is a public school district based in Tunica, Mississippi (USA). The district's boundaries parallel that of Tunica County.

== History ==
Tunica County schools organized in April 1846. The county seat was moved from Commerce to Austin because of flooding, and the former courthouse in Commerce was repurposed as a schoolhouse. During the Civil War, school funds were redirected to funding the Confederate Army. Public schools did not reopen until 1870. By 1988 there were 16 white and 19 black schools in operation. From 1872 through 1875, Edward Carter, a black man served as superintendent, but was not allowed to enter the property of the white schools. In 1905, $925 was appropriated for white schools, and $1,455 for black schools, although over 80% of the population was black and many of the white elite sent their children away for their education. Rosenwald Fund dollars allocated to build schools for black students were misappropriated to fund white students instead. Even after a pair of equalization programs to make funding more equitable, in 1962 the funding was $172.80 per white student and $5.99 per black student, which was the highest inequity in the state of Mississippi.

After the Supreme Court holding in Brown v. Board, which declared the doctrine of "separate but equal" schools to be unconstitutional, a "freedom of choice plan" was instituted from 1964 through 1969, which was designed to give the appearance of compliance with the law but in practice maintain a segregated system. By 1967, only 12 black students were in attendance at the formerly all-white schools, and no whites at all were attending black schools. In 1969, the district attempted to use intelligence tests to further segregated education, but were disappointed that the results would have required 1/3 of the white students to attend black schools. As a result, they asked the court to invalidate their own plan, but were refused. Then the Alexander v. Holmes County Board of Education decision superseded this by demanding the integration of all schools in January 1970.

When all public schools were required to be integrated in 1970, white students were directed by community leaders to report to one of three local churches. When school started, there were no white students in the public schools.

After the rise of the gambling industry in the county in the 1990s, an influx of tax revenue went into the school system. By 2007 the district built a new middle school between the casinos and the town of Tunica. Stephanie N. Mehta of Fortune said that because of the influx, the Tunica district pays "good teacher salaries by Mississippi standards".

In 1990, according to a Fortune article about Tunica, one in three students at Tunica's high school graduated from high school. In 1991 no agency tracked graduation rates. Mehta said that therefore that while it was believed that "[m]ore kids are graduating from high school - there's no way to know for sure" whether a significant improvement had been made in the year 2007. In 1997 the State of Mississippi took over the school district after the district did not meet basic performance standards. As of 2007 the high school graduation rate was 87%. Mehta that despite the influx of tax revenue, Rosa Fort High School in 2007 was "a stubborn underperformer." That year, it was ranked a "two" or "underperforming" in the State of Mississippi's five point scale, and about 60% of Rosa Fort's graduates have further schooling. Mehta concluded that "Rosa Fort students aren't a whole lot better off academically than before the casinos arrived." Ronald Love, who had been hired by the state in 1997 to supervise the Tunica school system, said "It is like Tunica suffers from a hangover from 100 years of poverty. There are vestiges of it everywhere: in education, in local politics, in the housing. And when you have been the poorest of the poor, well, an infusion of resources might lighten your load, but you still have the hangover."

=== State takeover ===
In July 2015, the Mississippi Board of Education requested that Governor Phil Bryant take over the Tunica County School District. The Board stated that the school district was violating 22 of 31 state accrediting standards. The Board was critical both of Tunica County's elected superintendent, Stephen Chandler, and of the district's special education program. Bryant signed an emergency declaration enabling the Mississippi Department of Education to take over the school district.

== Schools ==
- Rosa Fort High School (Unincorporated area, Grades 9-12)
- Tunica Middle School (Grades 6-8)
  - Formerly it was Rosa Fort Middle School, at the same location as Rosa Fort High.
- Dundee Elementary School (Unincorporated area, Dundee - Grades K-5)
- Robinsonville Elementary School (Unincorporated area, near but not inside the Tunica Resorts CDP - Grades Pre K-5)
- Tunica Elementary School (Tunica, Grades Pre K-5)

== Demographics ==
School Year	Enrollment	Gender Makeup		Racial Makeup					Eligible
School Year	Enrollment	Female	Male	Asian	African American	Hispanic	Native American	White	Free Lunch
2006-07	2,241	52%	48%	0.22%	97.32%	1.16%	0.09%	1.20%	88.7%
2005-06	2,323	52%	48%	0.26%	96.43%	1.20%	0.09%	2.02%	–
2004-05	2,307	52%	48%	0.26%	96.75%	0.91%	–	2.08%	–
2003-04	2,243	51%	49%	0.04%	97.28%	1.16%	–	1.52%	–
2002-03	2,106	51%	49%	0.09%	97.06%	1.00%	–	1.85%	–

== Accountability statistics ==
	2006-07	2005-06	2004-05	2003-04	2002-03
District Accreditation Status	Advised	Accredited	Accredited	Accredited	Accredited
School Performance Classifications
Level 5 (Superior Performing) Schools	0	0	0	0	0
Level 4 (Exemplary) Schools	0	1	1	1	0
Level 3 (Successful) Schools	3	2	2	3	2
Level 2 (Under Performing) Schools	1	2	1	1	3
Level 1 (Low Performing) Schools	1	0	1	0	0
Not Assigned	0	0	0	0	0

== See also ==
- List of school districts in Mississippi
