= Rosa Fort High School =

Coordinates: 34.7034°N 90.3736°W

- 1100 Rosa Fort Dr, Tunica, MS 38676; United States

Information
- Principal: Trosiki Pettis
- Staff: 44.68 (FTE)
- Grades: 9–12
- Gender: Coeducational
- Enrollment: 438 (2024–2025)
- Student to teacher ratio: 9.80
- Colors: Forest green and Vegas gold
- Mascot: Lions
- Website: rfhs.tunicak12.org

Rosa Fort High School (RFHS) is a senior high school in unincorporated Tunica County, Mississippi, adjacent to the North Tunica CDP, and near Tunica (with a Tunica postal address).

It is a part of the Tunica County School District, which includes all of Tunica County.

== History ==
Rosa Fort High School was named after a woman by the name of Rosa H. Fort. After the rise of the gambling industry in the county in the 1990s, an influx of tax revenue went into the school system. In 1990, according to a Fortune article about Tunica, one in three students at Tunica's high school graduated from high school. In 1991 no agency tracked graduation rates. According to the Fortune article, while "[m]ore kids are graduating from high school - there's no way to know for sure" whether a significant improvement had been made in the year 2007. Despite the influx of tax revenue, the article argues, Rosa Fort High in 2007 was "a stubborn underperformer." That year, it was ranked a "two" or "underperforming" in the State of Mississippi's five point scale. The article concluded that "Rosa Fort students aren't a whole lot better off academically than before the casinos arrived." Ronald Love, who had been hired by the state in 1997 to supervise the Tunica school system, said "It is like Tunica suffers from a hangover from 100 years of poverty. There are vestiges of it everywhere: in education, in local politics, in the housing. And when you have been the poorest of the poor, well, an infusion of resources might lighten your load, but you still have the hangover."

As of 2010 98% of the students were black. This differed from the private Tunica Academy (formerly Tunica Institute for Learning) a segregation academy founded in the desegregation period, where 97% were white.

== Notable alumni ==
- Jacoby Jones, NFL wide receiver for the Washington Commanders
