= Glenwood School =

Glenwood School may refer to:

- Glenwood Institute, defunct school in Matawan, New Jersey
- Glenwood School (Alabama)
- Glenwood School (Cissna Park, Illinois)
- Glenwood School, Winnipeg
- Glenwood Elementary and High School in Georgia, now merged with Winder-Barrow High School
