= Central Alabama Academy =

Segregation academy in Alabama

Location
- Montgomery, Alabama; 32.33958°N 86.20774°W

Information
- Type: Private
- Established: 1970
- Principal: H. J. Nick, Jr

Central Alabama Academy was a segregation academy in Montgomery, Alabama in 1970. The school opened on Debby Drive and subsequently moved to Vaughn Road. The site was taken over by Saint James School. The school adopted the name of a Methodist institution in Birmingham of the same name that existed 1866-1923.

== History ==
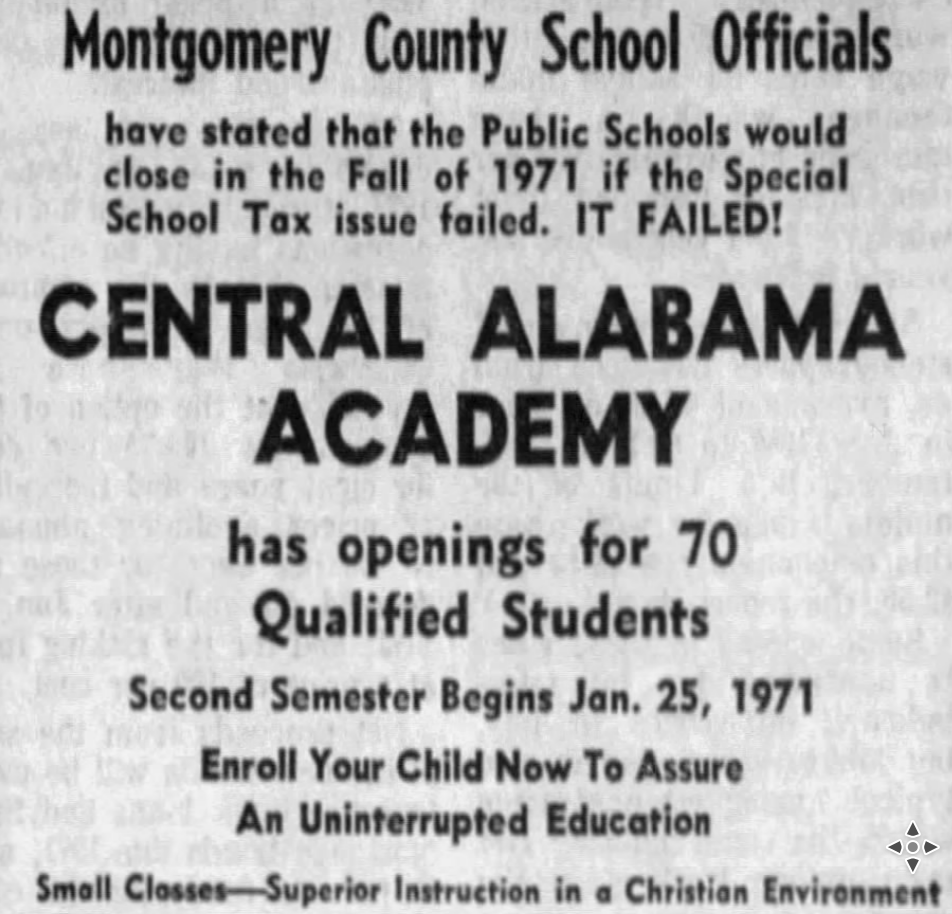
A 1971 advertisement for Central Alabama Academy

=== Background ===
National desegregation policy had been set by Brown v. Board of Education in 1954. Alabama, like Mississippi, largely ignored the ruling at first. In Montgomery, conflict over school segregation has triggered an effort to integrate public parks. In December 1958 the Montgomery Improvement Association (MIA) sued the city of Montgomery to force an end to racial segregation in the city's public parks. Rather than accede to this demand the city closed down all of its parks, including the Montgomery Zoo, effective on January 1, 1959. In response to this, Martin Luther King Jr. on behalf of the MIA, announced that the Association would attempt to end racial segregation in Montgomery public schools by having large numbers of black children apply for admission to white schools in order to provide test cases which might allow a judge to declare the Alabama Pupil Placement Act unconstitutional. Governor John Patterson threatened to shut down the public schools to prevent their integration and the Ku Klux Klan leader Robert Shelton promised that the Klan was prepared to prevent integration by violent means if necessary.

The first major lawsuit affecting Montgomery schools was Lee v. Macon County Board of Education in 1963. A three-judge panel issued a blanket desegregation order in 1967. Later, federal moves against segregation academies in Alabama switched from the courts to the IRS, addressing their non-profit status.

Four private schools in Montgomery would use city parks for football, basketball and baseball: Stephens-Spears (which had a published segregation policy), Central Alabama Academy (which had no published segregation policy), Montgomery Academy, and St. James which had "declared" open enrollment policies. Their use of the city facilities was defended by the city in Gilmore v. City of Montgomery (1972). The court found the schools' use of the facilities unconstitutional. The sitting judge was Frank M. Johnson whose son John was a student at the Montgomery Academy. He enjoined the city from continuing this practice, stating that "In allowing private academies to use city facilities, Montgomery is providing aid to private, segregated schools, thus facilitating their establishment and operation as an alternative for white students who in most instances are seeking to avoid desegregated public schools."

Academics have since described segregation academies in three categories, reflecting the social and economic divisions within the white community: (a) lower-class 'rebel yell' academies; (b) white community schools; and (c) upper-class day schools. It is unclear into which category Central Alabama Academy fell, but it did not last out the century.

=== Founding, operation, and decline ===
Central Alabama Academy was founded in 1970 as a segregation academy. The school operated at first near the Montgomery Mall, which opened the same year. Later, it moved east to Vaughn Road. It gave the property to Saint James School, which built its new campus there in 1990.
