= Alabama Independent School Association =

Alliance of schools in Alabama, United States

The Alabama Independent School Association is an organization of private schools in Alabama, formed in 1966 as the Alabama Private School Association. Originally a group of eight segregation academies, the membership grew to 60 by the 1971–72 school year. In 1990, the group voted to change its name to the Alabama Independent School Association. In 2008, an all-black school, Restoration Academy joined the AISA with no serious incidents. Today, the AISA serves 70 member schools. Most member schools are located in the state of Alabama, but one member school is located in Meridian, MS and one affiliate member is located in Smyrna, TN

The association offers its members with the opportunity to participate in numerous academic competitions, professional development programs, athletic programs and legislative tracking services as well.

In addition to the opportunities to participate in academic competitions, professional development and athletics, the AISA also maintains an accreditation partnership with AdvancED and offers member schools the opportunity for dual accreditation through AISA & AdvancED. This partnership was formed in 2012 after the long history of accreditation being offered through the AISA.

The athletic department of the Alabama Independent School Association sanctions and oversees high school athletics for approximately 50 private schools in the American state of Alabama. Sanctioned varsity and junior varsity sports include the following: football, basketball, baseball, fast-pitch softball, track and field, volleyball, golf, tennis, soccer, and cheerleading. Schools are classified into three classes, according to student enrollment, with championships awarded by class. The AISA also sanctions youth football for second grade through sixth grade.

The AISA offices are located on the campus of Huntingdon College in Montgomery, Alabama.

== Conferences ==
=== District 1 ===
- Patrician Academy, Butler
- Pickens Academy, Carrollton
- Russell Christian Academy, Meridian, MS
- South Choctaw Academy, Toxey
- Southern Academy, Greensboro

=== District 2 ===
- Bayside Academy, Daphne
- Bright Dyslexia Academy, Mobile
- Central Christian School, Robertsdale
- Cottage Hill Christian Academy, Mobile
- Faith Academy, Mobile
- Government Street Christian School, Mobile
- Lighthouse Baptist Academy, Theodore
- North Mobile Christian School, Saraland (K-8)
- Prichard Preparatory School, Mobile (K-5)
- St. Paul's Episcopal School, Mobile
- St. Michael Catholic High School, Fairhope
- Snook Christian Academy, Foley
- Temple Christian Academy, Atmore
- UMS-Wright Preparatory School, Mobile

=== District 3 ===
- Clarke Prep School, Grove Hill
- Escambia Academy, Atmore
- Fort Dale Academy, Greenville
- Jackson Academy, Jackson
- Lowndes Academy, Lowndesboro
- Monroe Academy, Monroeville
- Morgan Academy, Selma
- Sparta Academy, Evergreen
- Wilcox Academy, Camden

=== District 4 ===
- Abbeville Christian Academy, Abbeville
- Crenshaw Christian Academy, Luverne
- Houston Academy, Dothan
- Northside Methodist Academy, Dothan
- Pike Liberal Arts School, Troy
- The Lakeside School, Eufaula

=== District 5 ===
- Autauga Academy, Prattville
- Eastwood Christian School, Montgomery
- Evangel Christian Academy, Montgomery
- Hooper Academy, Hope Hull
- Saint James School, Montgomery
- Success Unlimited Academy, Montgomery
- The Montgomery Academy, Montgomery
- Trinity Presbyterian School, Montgomery
- Valiant Cross Academy, Montgomery

=== District 6 ===
- Chambers Academy, Lafayette
- Churchill Academy, Montgomery
- Coosa Valley Academy, Harpersville
- Edgewood Academy, Elmore
- Glenwood School, Smiths Station
- Lee-Scott Academy, Auburn
- Macon East Academy, Montgomery
- Southern Preparatory Academy, Camp Hill
- Springwood School, Lanett
- The Oaks School, Opelika

=== District 7 ===
- Advent Episcopal School, Birmingham (K-8)
- Altamont School, Birmingham
- Banks School, Banks
- Bessemer Academy, Bessemer
- Cahawba Christian School, Centreville
- The Capitol School, Tuscaloosa
- Coosa Christian School, Gadsden
- Cornerstone Christian School, Birmingham
- The Donoho School, Anniston
- Gathering Place Christian Academy, Moody (K-8)
- Heritage Christian Academy, Decatur
- Highlands School, Birmingham (K-8)
- Hillsboro School, Helena
- Indian Springs School
- Miracle Academy, Birmingham (K-8)
- New Hope Christian School, Birmingham (K-8)
- North River Christian Academy, Tuscaloosa
- Randolph School, Huntsville
- Restoration Academy, Fairfield
- Riverhill School, Florence (PK-6)
- Rock City Preparatory Christian School, Birmingham
- Spring Valley School, Birmingham
- Sumiton Christian School, Sumiton
- Tuscaloosa Academy, Tuscaloosa
- Tuscaloosa Christian School, Cottondale
- Victory Christian School, Millbrook
