= Escambia Academy =

Segregation academy in Alabama

Location
- 268 Cowpen Creek Road; Atmore, Alabama 36502; United States; 31°01′47″N 87°24′28″W

Information
- Type: Private School K4-12
- Motto: We are building champions both on and off the field
- Established: 1970 (56 years ago)
- CEEB code: 010586
- NCES School ID: 00001015
- Principal: Susan Kirk
- Faculty: 30 (on full-time equivalent basis)
- Grades: KG to 12
- Gender: Co-education
- Enrollment: 215 (2022)
- Campus size: 47.75 acres (19.32 ha)
- Campus type: Rural
- Colors: Maroon and gold
- Mascot: The Cougar
- Website: eacougar.com

Escambia Academy is a private school in unincorporated Escambia, United States, with an Atmore post office address. It enrolls 215 students in grades KG–12. It was founded in 1970 as a segregation academy.

== Description ==
Escambia Academy is a member of the Alabama Independent School Association (AISA). Escambia Academy is fully accredited by AdvancED.

Escambia uses a school gun raffle as a fund raising tool.

== Athletics ==
Escambia Academy's varsity teams compete athletically in the Alabama Independent School Association, an organization that was founded to support segregation academies.

AISA Championships

- Basketball- 2004 (AISA-AA), 1986 (AISA-A) Boys
- Basketball- 2005 (AISA-AA), 2004 (AISA-AA), 2002 (AISA-A), 2000 (AISA-A) Girls
- Football- 2014 AISA Championship (AISA-AAA)
- Football- 2017 AISA Championship (AISA-AA)
- Track and Field- 2010 AISA Championship Boys (AISA-AA)
- Track and Field- 2010 AISA Championship Girls (AISA-AA)
- Track and Field- 2012 AISA Championship Boys (AISA-AA)
- Track and Field- 2012 AISA Championship Girls Tie with Sparta Academy (AISA-AA)
- Track and Field- 2015 AISA Championship (AISA-AAA)
- Track and Field- 2016 AISA Championship (AISA-AA)
- Track and Field- 2017 AISA Championship (AISA-AA)
- Track and Field- 2018 AISA Championship (AISA-AA)
- Track and Filed- 2019 AISA Championship (AISA-AA)
- Track and Field- 2021 AISA Championship Varsity Boys (AISA-AA)
- Track and Field- 2022 AISA Championship Varsity Boys (AISA-AA)
- Track and Field- 2023 AISA Runner-up Junior Varsity Boys (AISA-A)
- Track and Field- 2024 AISA 1A/2A Junior Varsity Boys Championship (AISA-A)
- Powerlifting 2013 AISA Championship (AISA-AAA) and overall Championship
- Powerlifting 2017 EA weightlifters break 3 AISA records
- Powerlifting 2019 AISA Championship (AISA-AA) and overall Championship
- Powerlifting 2020 AISA Championship (AISA-AA) and overall Championship
- Powerlifting 2022 AISA Championship (AISA-AA) and overall Championship
