= Mottola (surname) =

Mottola or Möttölä is an Italian and Finnish surname. Notable people with the surname include:

- Chad Mottola (born 1971), American baseball player and coach
- Greg Mottola (born 1964), American filmmaker
- Hanno Möttölä (born 1976), Finnish basketball player
- Tommy Mottola (born 1949), music executive
- Tony Mottola (1918–2004), American guitarist
