= Walter L. Weaver =

American politician

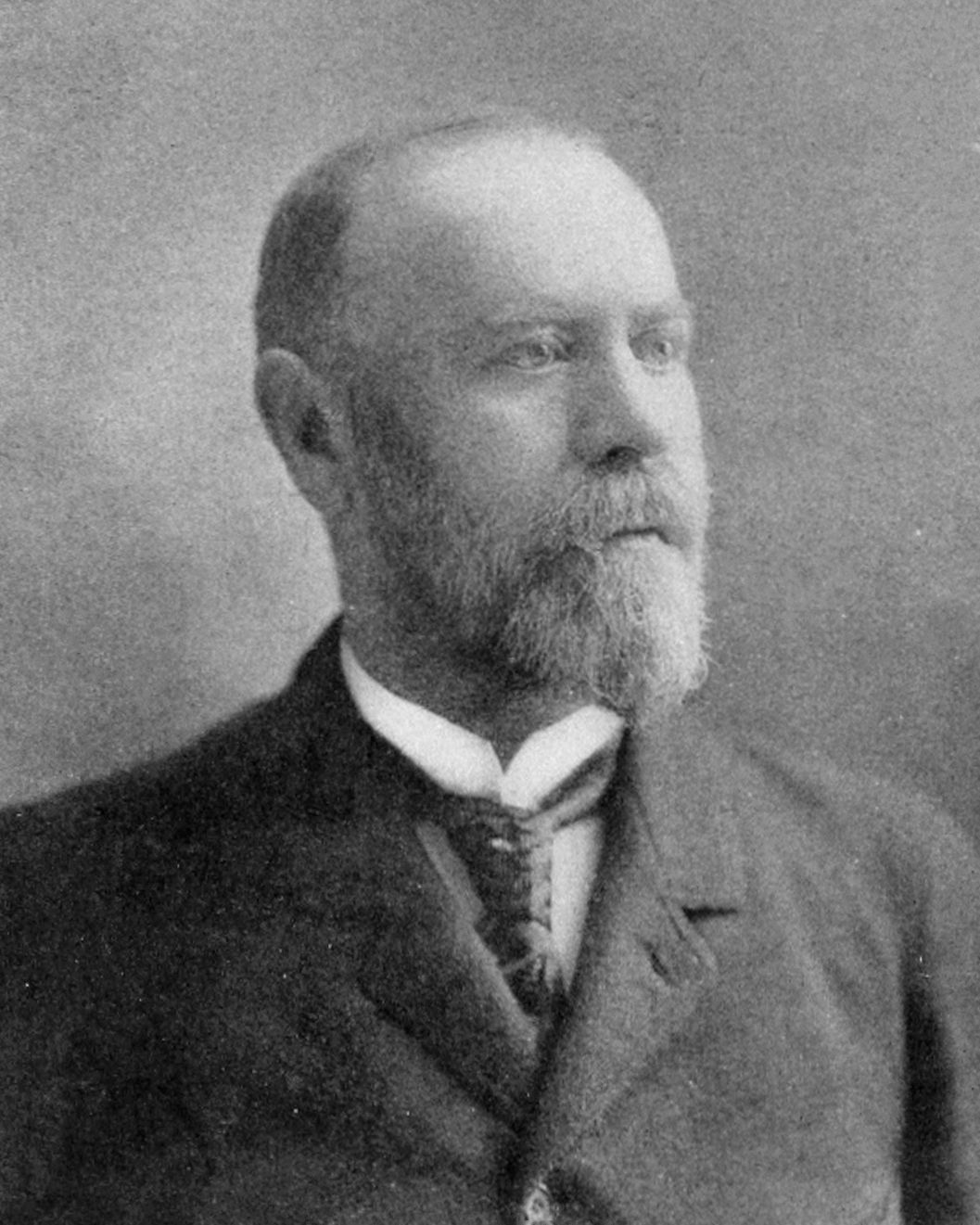

Member of the U.S. House of Representatives from Ohio's 7th district
- In office March 4, 1897 – March 3, 1901
- Preceded by: George W. Wilson
- Succeeded by: Thomas B. Kyle

Personal details
- Born: Walter Lowrie Weaver; April 1, 1851 Montgomery County, Ohio, U.S.
- Died: May 26, 1909 (aged 58) Springfield, Ohio, U.S.
- Resting place: Ferncliff Cemetery
- Party: Republican
- Education: Monroe Academy; Wittenberg College

Walter Lowrie Weaver (April 1, 1851 – May 26, 1909) was an American lawyer and politician who served two terms as a U.S. representative from Ohio from 1897 to 1901.

== Biography ==
Born in Montgomery County, Ohio, Weaver attended the public schools and Monroe Academy, and was graduated from Wittenberg College, Springfield, Ohio, in 1870.

=== Early career ===
He studied law and was admitted to the bar in 1872 and commenced practice in Springfield, Ohio. Weaver was elected prosecuting attorney of Clark County in 1874, 1880, 1882, and 1885.

=== Congress ===
Weaver was elected as a Republican to the Fifty-fifth and Fifty-sixth Congresses (March 4, 1897 – March 3, 1901). He served as chairman of the Committee on Elections No. 2 (Fifty-sixth Congress).

He was an unsuccessful candidate for renomination in 1900.

=== Later career ===
After leaving Congress, he was appointed associate justice Choctaw-Chickasaw citizens' court at McAlester, Oklahoma, in 1902. He returned to Springfield, Ohio, in 1904 and resumed the practice of law.

=== Death and burial ===
He died in Springfield, Ohio, May 26, 1909 and was buried in Ferncliff Cemetery.

== Sources ==
- United States Congress. "Walter L. Weaver (id: W000229)". Biographical Directory of the United States Congress.

U.S. House of Representatives
Preceded by George W. Wilson	Member of the U.S. House of Representatives from Ohio's 7th congressional district March 4, 1897–March 3, 1901	Succeeded by Thomas B. Kyle
