= Robert Weil =

Robert Weil may refer to:

- Robert Weil (businessman) (born 1948), Swedish entrepreneur and philanthropist
- Robert Weil (writer) (1881–1950), Austrian playwright and screenwriter
- Robert Weil (editor), American magazine editor and publisher
- Robert Schoenhof Weil (1919–2016), American businessman and philanthropist
