= Thomas B. Kyle =

American politician (1856–1915)

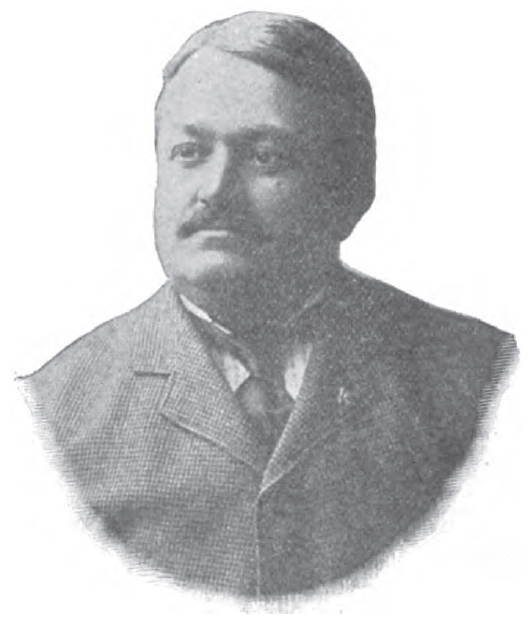

Member of the U.S. House of Representatives from Ohio's 7th district
- In office March 4, 1901 – March 3, 1905
- Preceded by: Walter L. Weaver
- Succeeded by: J. Warren Keifer

Personal details
- Born: Thomas Barton Kyle; March 10, 1856 Troy, Ohio, US
- Died: August 13, 1915 (aged 59) Troy, Ohio, US
- Resting place: Riverside Cemetery
- Party: Republican
- Education: Dartmouth College

Thomas Barton Kyle (March 10, 1856 – August 13, 1915) was a lawyer, politician, and two-term U.S. Representative from Ohio from 1901 to 1905.

== Biography ==
Born in Troy, Ohio, Kyle attended the public schools and Dartmouth College in Hanover, New Hampshire. He subsequently studied law, and was admitted to the bar in 1884. He then commenced his practice in Troy. Kyle was elected as the prosecuting attorney of Miami County in 1890. He served as president of the board of education of Troy and later was the town's mayor.

=== Congress ===
Kyle was elected as a Republican to the Fifty-seventh and Fifty-eighth Congresses (March 4, 1901 – March 3, 1905). He was an unsuccessful candidate for renomination in 1904.

=== Later career and death ===
He resumed the practice of his profession in Troy, where he died on August 13, 1915. He was interred in Riverside Cemetery.

== Sources ==
- United States Congress. "Thomas B. Kyle (id: K000355)". Biographical Directory of the United States Congress.

U.S. House of Representatives
Preceded by Walter L. Weaver	Member of the U.S. House of Representatives from Ohio's 7th congressional district March 4, 1901–March 3, 1905	Succeeded by J. Warren Keifer
