= 1992 Major League Baseball draft =

Baseball draft of amateur players

General information
- Date: June 1, 1992
- Location: Conference call

Overview
- 1,412 total selections
- First selection: Phil Nevin; Houston Astros
- First round selections: 38
- Hall of Famers: 2: SS Derek Jeter; 1B Todd Helton

The 1992 Major League Baseball draft took place on June 1, 1992, through a conference call involving all 28 MLB teams of the time. Phil Nevin of Cal State Fullerton was the first overall selection, chosen by the Houston Astros. Derek Jeter, selected for the National Baseball Hall of Fame in January 2020, was selected by the New York Yankees with the sixth selection. In addition to Nevin, Paul Shuey, B. J. Wallace, Jeffrey Hammonds, and Chad Mottola were selected ahead of Jeter.

== Background ==
The 1993 expansion Colorado Rockies and Florida Marlins participated in the MLB Draft for the first time in 1992.

With the first overall selections of the previous two drafts, Chipper Jones and Brien Taylor, receiving signing bonuses of $1.2 million ($2,957,208 in current dollar terms) and $1.55 million ($3,663,877 in current dollar terms) respectively, salary demands of new players became a factor in the 1992 draft. Prior to the draft, Jeffrey Hammonds of the Stanford Cardinal baseball team sought a signing bonus of $1.8 million ($4,129,713 in current dollar terms). Derek Jeter, a high school player who had a commitment to play college baseball at the University of Michigan, was believed to be seeking a bonus of at least $1 million ($2,294,285 in current dollar terms) to forego college.

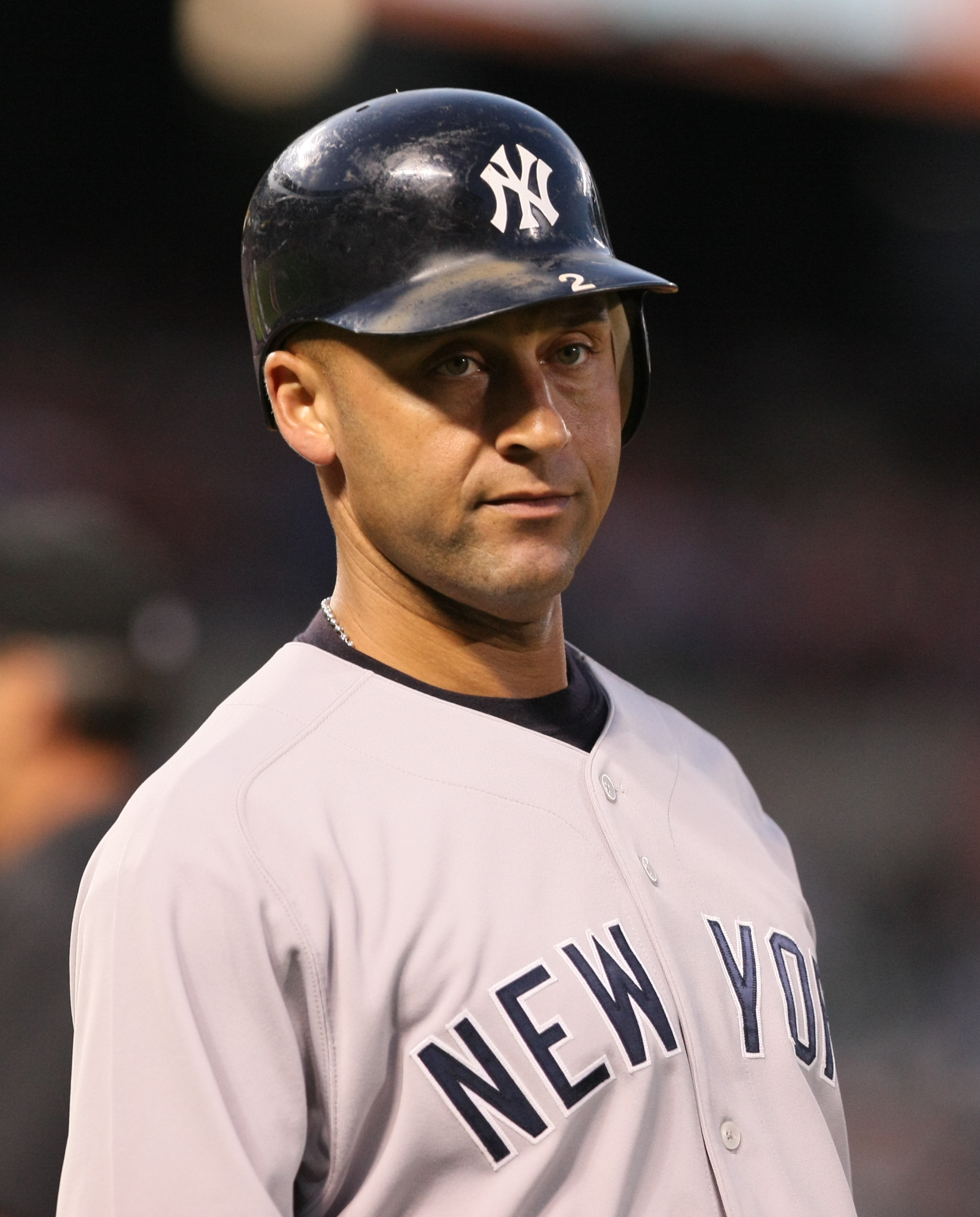
Five teams passed on Derek Jeter during the 1992 MLB Draft.

The Astros, holding the first overall selection, were keenly aware of the bonus demands of Hammonds and Jeter, as they were unable to sign their first-round pick in the 1991 MLB draft, John Burke, who held out for a bonus of $500,000 ($1,181,896 in current dollar terms) as the sixth overall selection. They selected Phil Nevin, the 1992 College World Series Most Outstanding Player, with the first overall selection. In addition to perceiving Nevin as close to MLB-ready, needing little development in minor league baseball, Nevin also did not seek a large signing bonus. He agreed to sign with the Astros for $700,000 ($1,606,000 in current dollar terms). Astros' scout Hal Newhouser quit in protest, as he had insisted to Astros' management that they should choose Jeter.

The teams with the first four selections, the Astros, Cleveland Indians, Montreal Expos, and Baltimore Orioles, had the four lowest payrolls in MLB. The Cleveland Indians selected Paul Shuey out of the University of North Carolina with the second selection, who they projected could develop into a closer comparable to Rob Dibble. The Expos, who preferred Hammonds, drafted B. J. Wallace instead, as they were unable to afford Hammonds' salary demands. The Orioles selected Hammonds with the fourth overall selection; he signed with the Orioles for $975,000 ($2,236,928 in current dollar terms), the largest signing bonus given out in the 1992 Draft. With the fifth pick, the Reds chose Chad Mottola from the University of Central Florida (UCF), making Mottola the first UCF athlete to be chosen in the first round of a professional sports draft. He signed with the Reds the day of the draft for $400,000 ($917,714 in current dollar terms).

Yankees scout Dick Groch, assigned to scout in the Midwest, watched Jeter participate in an all-star camp held at Western Michigan University, and came away sold by Jeter's talent. Though the Yankees were also concerned that Jeter might attend college, Grouch convinced the team to select Jeter. Regarding the possibility Jeter would attend Michigan, Groch said "the only place Derek Jeter's going is to Cooperstown", referring to the home city of the Baseball Hall of Fame. Jeter signed with the Yankees for $800,000 ($1,835,428 in current dollar terms).

Scott Boras advised Charles Johnson and Michael Tucker. Those players fell in the first round as their perceived salary demands were too high for many teams.

== First round selections ==
Key
†	All-Star	= Baseball Hall of Famer

Pick	Player	Team	Position	School
1	Phil Nevin†	Houston Astros	Third baseman	Cal State Fullerton
2	Paul Shuey	Cleveland Indians	Pitcher	North Carolina
3	B. J. Wallace	Montreal Expos	Pitcher	Mississippi State
4	Jeffrey Hammonds^{†}	Baltimore Orioles	Outfielder	Stanford
5	Chad Mottola	Cincinnati Reds	Outfielder	UCF
6	Derek Jeter	New York Yankees	Shortstop	Kalamazoo Central High School (MI)
7	Calvin Murray	San Francisco Giants	Outfielder	Texas
8	Pete Janicki	California Angels	Pitcher	UCLA
9	Preston Wilson^{†}	New York Mets	Shortstop	Bamberg-Ehrhardt High School (SC)
10	Michael Tucker	Kansas City Royals	Shortstop	Longwood
11	Derek Wallace	Chicago Cubs	Pitcher	Pepperdine
12	Kenny Felder	Milwaukee Brewers	Outfielder	Florida State
13	Chad McConnell	Philadelphia Phillies	Outfielder	Creighton
14	Ron Villone	Seattle Mariners	Pitcher	UMass
15	Sean Lowe	St. Louis Cardinals	Pitcher	Arizona State
16	Rick Greene	Detroit Tigers	Pitcher	LSU
17	Jim Pittsley	Kansas City Royals (Note: Compensation pick from the San Diego Padres for signing Kurt Stillwell)	Pitcher	DuBois Area Senior High School (PA)
18	Chris Roberts	New York Mets (Note: Compensation pick from the Boston Red Sox for signing Frank Viola)	Pitcher	Florida State
19	Shannon Stewart	Toronto Blue Jays (Note: Compensation pick from the Los Angeles Dodgers for signing Tom Candiotti)	Outfielder	Miami Southridge Senior High School (FL)
20	Benji Grigsby	Oakland Athletics	Pitcher	San Diego State
21	Jamie Arnold	Atlanta Braves	Pitcher	Osceola High School (FL)
22	Rick Helling	Texas Rangers	Pitcher	Stanford
23	Jason Kendall^{†}	Pittsburgh Pirates	Catcher	Torrance High School (CA)
24	Eddie Pearson	Chicago White Sox	First baseman	Bishop State Junior College
25	Todd Steverson	Toronto Blue Jays	Outfielder	Arizona State
26	Dan Serafini	Minnesota Twins	Pitcher	Junipero Serra High School (CA)
27	John Burke	Colorado Rockies	Pitcher	Florida
28	Charles Johnson^{†}	Florida Marlins	Catcher	Miami (FL)
29	Jeff Schmidt	California Angels (Note: Supplemental pick as compensation for the loss of Wally Joyner)	Pitcher	Minnesota
30	Jon Ward	New York Mets (Note: Supplemental pick as compensation for the loss of Frank Viola)	Pitcher	Huntington Beach High School (CA)
31	Sherard Clinkscales	Kansas City Royals (Note: Supplemental pick as compensation for the loss of Danny Tartabull)	Pitcher	Purdue
32	Ryan Luzinski	Los Angeles Dodgers (Note: Supplemental pick as compensation for the loss of Eddie Murray)	Catcher	Holy Cross High School
33	Shon Walker	Pittsburgh Pirates (Note: Supplemental pick as compensation for the loss of Bobby Bonilla)	Outfielder	Harrison County High School
34	Brandon Cromer	Toronto Blue Jays (Note: Supplemental pick as compensation for the loss of Tom Candiotti)	Shortstop	Lexington High School
35	Johnny Damon^{†}	Kansas City Royals (Note: Supplemental pick as compensation for the loss of Kurt Stillwell)	Outfielder	Dr. Phillips High School (FL)
36	Michael Moore	Los Angeles Dodgers (Note: Supplemental pick as compensation for the loss of Mike Morgan)	Outfielder	UCLA
37	Kendall Rhine	Houston Astros (Note: Supplemental pick as compensation for failing to sign 1991 first-round pick John Burke)	Pitcher	Georgia
38	Gabby Martinez	Milwaukee Brewers (Note: Supplemental pick as compensation for failing to sign 1991 first-round pick Kenny Henderson)	Shortstop	Luchetti High School (PR)

== Other notable players ==
- Jon Lieber, 2nd round, 44th overall by the Pittsburgh Pirates
- Bob Wolcott, 2nd round, 52nd overall by the Seattle Mariners
- Todd Helton‡, 2nd round, 55th overall by the San Diego Padres, but did not sign
- Jason Giambi, 2nd round, 58th overall by the Oakland Athletics
- Jamie Howard, 2nd round, 59th overall by the Atlanta Braves
- Chris Widger, 3rd round, 82nd overall by the Seattle Mariners
- Chris Gomez, 3rd round, 84th overall by the Detroit Tigers
- Doug Mirabelli, 5th round, 131st overall by the San Francisco Giants
- José Vidro, 6th round, 155th overall by the Montreal Expos
- Aaron Fultz, 6th round, 159th overall by the San Francisco Giants
- Bill Simas, 6th round, 160th overall by the California Angels
- Scott Karl, 6th round, 164th overall by the Milwaukee Brewers
- Jamie Walker, 10th round, 265th overall by the Houston Astros
- Frank Catalanotto, 10th round, 280th overall by the Detroit Tigers
- Scot McCloughan, 10th round, 289th overall by the Toronto Blue Jays
- Casey Blake, 11th round, 305th overall by the Philadelphia Phillies, but did not sign
- Craig Counsell, 11th round, 319th overall by the Colorado Rockies
- Bobby Higginson, 12th round, 336th overall by the Detroit Tigers
- Doug Mientkiewicz, 12th round, 345th overall by the Toronto Blue Jays, but did not sign
- Darin Erstad, 13th round, 357th overall by the New York Mets, but did not sign
- Mark Hendrickson, 13th round, 369th overall by the Atlanta Braves, but did not sign
- Craig Wilson, 13th round, 372nd overall by the Chicago White Sox
- Todd Greene, 14th round, 391st overall by the St. Louis Cardinals
- Juan Acevedo, 14th round, 403rd overall by the Colorado Rockies
- Scott Schoeneweis, 15th round, 407th overall by the Montreal Expos, but did not sign
- José Cruz Jr., 15th round, 425th overall by the Atlanta Braves, but did not sign
- Bubba Trammell, 15th round, 436th overall by the Baltimore Orioles, but did not sign
- Bobby Bonds Jr., 18th round, 505th overall by the San Diego Padres
- Ryan Franklin, 23rd round, 642nd overall by the Seattle Mariners
- Mike DeJean, 24th round, 662nd overall by the New York Yankees
- Geoff Jenkins, 24th round, 673rd overall by the San Diego Padres, but did not sign
- Rich Aurilia, 24th round, 678th overall by the Texas Rangers
- Quinton McCracken, 25th round, 711th overall by the Colorado Rockies
- Mark Brandenburg, 26th round by the Texas Rangers
- Matt Morris, 26th round, 724th overall by the Milwaukee Brewers, but did not sign
- Brendan Donnelly, 27th round, 764th overall by the Chicago White Sox
- Joe McEwing, 28th round, 783rd overall by the St. Louis Cardinals
- Bob Howry, 29th round, 797th overall by the Houston Astros, but did not sign
- Raúl Ibañez, 36th round, 1006th overall by the Seattle Mariners
- T. J. Mathews, 36th round, 1007th overall by the St. Louis Cardinals
- Gary Matthews Jr., 38th round, 1074th overall by the Minnesota Twins, but did not sign
- Scott Sullivan, 39th round, 1088th overall by the Milwaukee Brewers, but did not sign
- Mark Redman, 41st round, 1148th overall by the Detroit Tigers, but did not sign
- Jermaine Dye, 43rd round, 1210th overall by the Texas Rangers, but did not sign
- Robert Fick, 45th round, 1264th overall by the Oakland Athletics, but did not sign
- Tim Cossins, 45th round, 1267th overall by the Pittsburgh Pirates, but did not sign
- Mike Lowell, 48th round, 1352nd overall by the Chicago White Sox, but did not sign
- Marvin Benard, 50th round, 1391st overall by the San Francisco Giants

=== NBA players drafted ===
- Erick Strickland, 31st round, 880th overall by the Florida Marlins

=== NFL players drafted ===
- John Lynch, 2nd round, 66th overall by the Florida Marlins
- Danan Hughes, 3rd round, 79th overall by the Milwaukee Brewers
- Robert Chancey, 6th round by the Baltimore Orioles
- Danny Kanell, 19th round, 528th overall by the Milwaukee Brewers, but did not sign
- Lawyer Milloy, 29th round, 798th overall by the Cleveland Indians, but did not sign
- Terrell Buckley, 38th round, 1069th overall by the Atlanta Braves
- Mark Brunell, 44th round, 1237th overall by the Atlanta Braves, but did not sign
- Bert Emanuel, 49th round, 1379th overall by the Pittsburgh Pirates, but did not sign

== See also ==
- List of first overall Major League Baseball draft picks

Preceded by Brien Taylor	1st Overall Picks; Phil Nevin	Succeeded by Alex Rodriguez
