= Abbeville Christian Academy =

Segregation academy in Alabama

Coordinates: 31°34′37″N 85°15′39″W

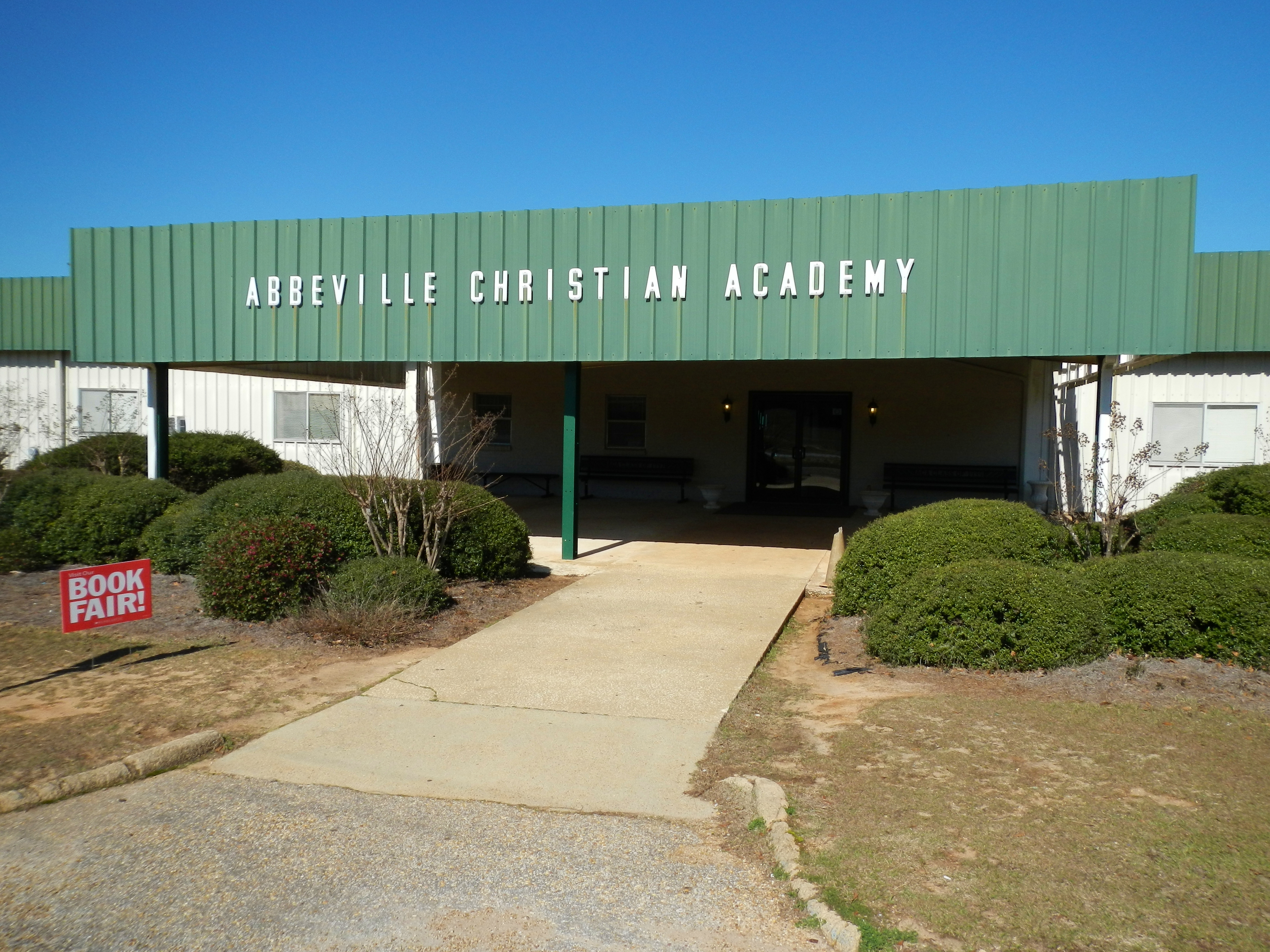

Location
- 258 M. L. Tillis Drive; Abbeville, Henry County, Alabama 36310; United States

Information
- School type: Private College-preparatory school
- Religious affiliation: Christian
- Denomination: Nonsectarian
- Established: 1970; 56 years ago
- CEEB code: 010001
- Headmaster: Amanda Ates
- Teaching staff: 17.9 (FTE) (2017–18)
- Grades: PK–12
- Gender: Coeducational
- Enrollment: 234 (218 K–12) (2017–18)
- Student to teacher ratio: 12.2∶1 (2017–18)
- Campus: Rural
- Nickname: Generals
- Accreditations: AISA, AdvancED
- Website: acagenerals.org
- Last updated: January 1, 2022; 4 years ago

Abbeville Christian Academy is a PK–12 private Christian college-preparatory school in Abbeville, Alabama, USA. Abbeville Christian Academy is a fully accredited member of the Alabama Independent School Association, NCPSA, and SACS. Abbeville was founded in 1970 as a segregation academy. In 2016, three black children were enrolled in this school of 234. The surrounding community is 40% Black.
