= Robert R. Gaines =

American geologist

Robert Gaines
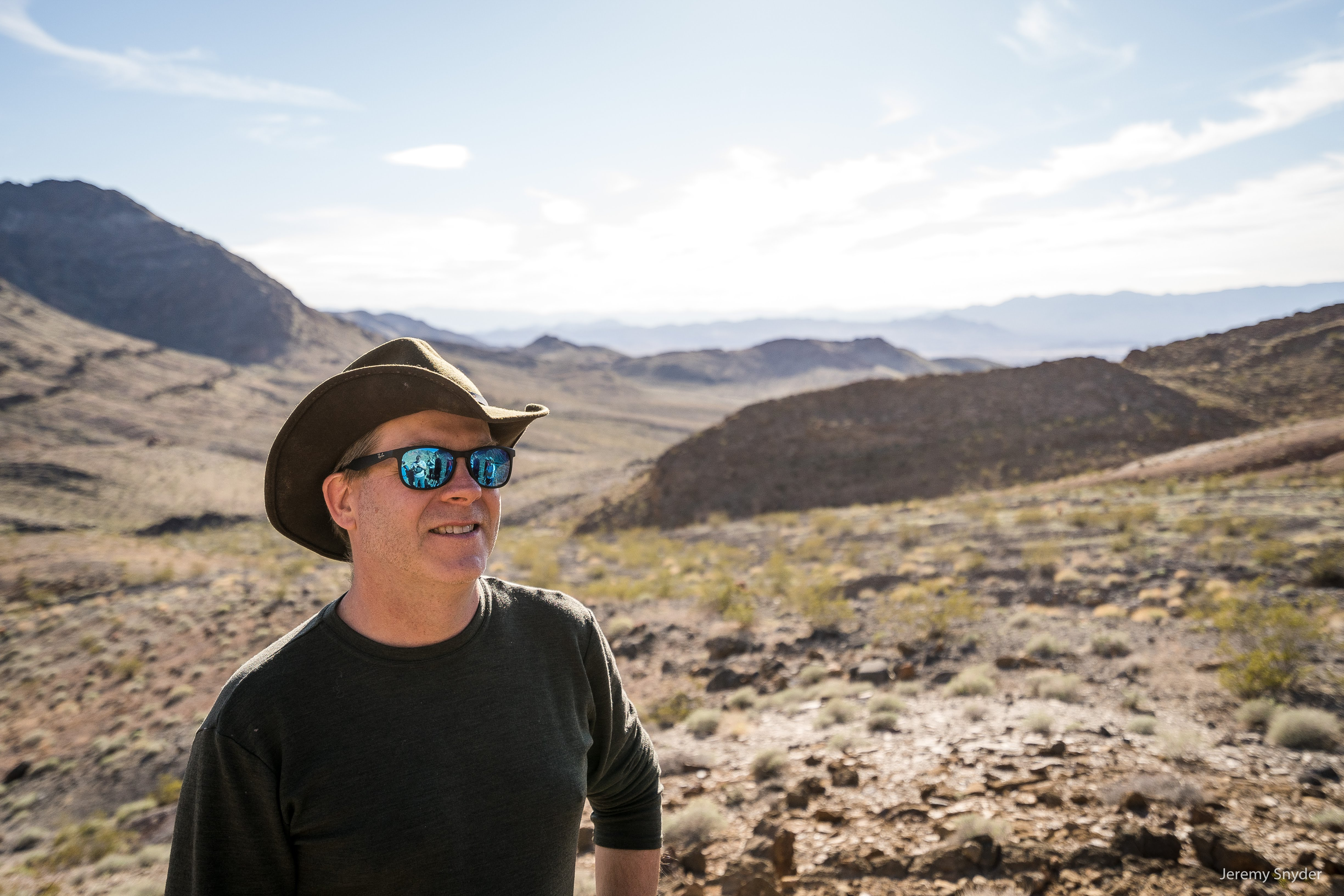
- Gaines on a geology field trip in the Nopah Range Wilderness Area, California
- Born: Robert R. Gaines; 1973 (age 52–53); Columbus, Mississippi
- Education: College of William & Mary (BS); University of Cincinnati (MS); University of California, Riverside (PhD)
- Scientific career
- Fields: Geology; Sedimentology; Burgess Shale; Cambrian explosion; Palaeoecology; Geomicrobiology
- Workplaces: Pomona College
- Thesis: Dissecting a Cambrian Lagerstätte: Insights from the Wheeler Formation, Utah (2003)

Robert Riepma Gaines (born 22 March 1973) is an American geologist who is the Edwin F. and Martha Hahn professor at Pomona College in Claremont, California. He served as acting President of Pomona College during 2024-25. Previously, he served as Vice President of Academic Affairs and Dean of the College from 2019 to 2022. He is known for his research on fossils in Burgess Shale-type deposits, having been a member of two teams that made two of the most important fossil discoveries in recent decades, one in Kootenay National Park in British Columbia, Canada and the other in the Yangtze Gorges area in South China.

== Biography ==
=== Early life ===
Gaines was born in Columbus, Mississippi, to Robert Anderson and Elizabeth Blair Gaines. Shortly after Gaines's sister Elizabeth was born, the family moved to Montgomery, Alabama.

Once in Montgomery, Gaines's father taught theatre history and acting at a satellite of Auburn University, eventually becoming head of the Theatre Department. His mother taught journalism, public relations and mass communication at the same university. Gaines and his sister both talked before they walked, growing up in an academic house that valued words and ideas. Gaines first became interested in paleontology when he was in preschool, when his mom brought him a trilobite as a souvenir from a trip to Utah. He announced to his preschool class on career day that he wanted to be a paleontologist.

His mother had a passion for Ancient Egypt, and Gaines considered a career in Archeology, participating in several digs in Alabama in his teenage years. Thanks to his dad's passion for theater, he also tried his hand at acting, participating in productions in community theatre all the way up to a professional role at the Alabama Shakespeare Festival in 1986.

=== Education ===
Gaines attended The Montgomery Academy in Montgomery, Alabama, from grade school on and graduated in 1991. Following in his parents' footsteps he attended the College of William & Mary in Williamsburg, Virginia, and received a Bachelor of Science in Geology in 1995. While at William & Mary his love for fossils grew. He testified before the Virginia State Legislature to help name Chesapecten Jeffersonius, an ancient scallop, the state fossil of Virginia. He took a road trip with a faculty member to the House Range in Utah, where he found the source of his very first trilobite fossil that his mother had given him. The House Range was to become one of his favorite places on earth, and he went on to do his PhD on Cambrian ecosystems there.

For a master's degree in geology, Gaines attended the University of Cincinnati. He took a class with his future PhD advisor, Dr. Mary L. Droser, on sabbatical from UC Riverside, who further instilled his passion for fossils and ancient ecosystems. After graduating with his masters in 1998, he decided to work with Droser at University of California, Riverside, in the department of Earth Sciences. In 2003 he completed his dissertation titled: "Dissecting a Cambrian Lagerstätte: Insights from the Wheeler Formation, Utah."

During his first year at University of Cincinnati Gaines met his wife, Maria Prokopenko. They were married in Malibu in 2002. She is also a professor at Pomona in the geology department. She researches marine biogeochemical cycles. Similar to him, she is interested in the intersection of biology and geology, looking to identify and characterize the links between biologically driven fluxes and physical processes in the ocean.

== Career ==
Gaines arrived at Pomona College in 2003 as a visiting professor and was hired on the tenure-track only a year later. He was tenured in 2009. He is the Edwin F. and Martha Hahn Professor of Geology, teaching core courses such as Sedimentology and Earth History, while also offering introductory courses or electives on topics such as Carbonates, Climate Change, and Paleontology. He was twice awarded the Pomona College Wig Award for Teaching. He ensures that his students are engaged with research, from bringing students along to his field camp in British Columbia, to turning class field trips into sample collection opportunities. He received multiple grants from government and private agencies for substantial expansion of the analytical facilities of the college and Geology Department. Working in collaboration with Pomona College professors David M. Tanenbaum, Mark Los Huertos and Jade Star Lackey, they established the David W. and Claire B. Oxtoby Environmental Isotope Lab and purchased an ICP-MS, IRMS, SEM, XRF spectrometer, and XRD.

He was an active member of the community beyond the Geology department, serving on multiple committees such as the strategic planning steering committee, research committee, faculty position advisory committee and faculty executive committee.

In July 2019, Gaines was appointed vice president and Dean of the college. Even as dean, he has not ceased to instill excitement in students and faculty alike regarding Earth's history. In his convocation speech to start the 2019–20 school year he gave every student in the class of 2023 504 million-year-old trilobite fossils, offering them an interesting scale in which to place their four years of college and inspiring them to take advantage of their time at Pomona.

He has been an active voice in making Pomona a more environmentally sustainable institution, and as dean has advocated for vegetarian-only catering, Meatless Mondays for all school cafeterias, and reusable tableware at school events. He has taught a class on Climate Change which for spring 2017 he revised to be an introductory geology class attracting over 50 students, far more than the average class size at Pomona.

== Research ==
Gaines's area of expertise lies at the intersection of geology and biology. Most broadly, his research topics include burgess shale-type deposits, the Cambrian explosion, and microbial mineral interactions. He works on ancient sedimentary rocks all across the northern hemisphere; in British Columbia, South China, and American Great Basin.

His work in British Columbia received global attention when, in 2012, their team discovered a new Burgess Shale fossil site in Kootenay National Park, some 40 km south of where the Burgess Shale outcrop was first discovered in 1909. The discovery of this new site was hailed the most important fossil finding of recent decades. The leader of this team is Jean-Bernard Caron, curator of invertebrate paleontology at the Royal Ontario Museum in Toronto. They work together with other paleontologists and graduate students. The treasure trove of fossils they have discovered continues to contribute to the rapidly developing understanding of the Cambrian and evolutionary history as each fossil species gets placed into their respective taxonomic groups. Gaines's work in Kootenay National Park has been featured as a cover story for Science Magazine in 2018, as well as on the CBC series The Nature of Things, episode "First Animals."

Gaines was part of yet another historical discovery of a Burgess Shale-type site in Southern China. He is the only American on a team of Chinese scientists, invited to work on their team because of his expertise on Burgess Shale-type deposits. The site is located on a bank of the Danshui River close to its intersection with the Qinjiang River in Hubei Province, around 1000 km northeast of Chengjiang, another Lagerstätte of Burgess Shale-type fossils. The discovery includes a large proportion of new taxa across much taxonomic diversity, and is characterized by pristine fossil preservation. According to Science, this was the most significant Cambrian fossil discovery in modern times.

Gaines also works on Burgess Shale-type fossil assemblages in the Wheeler formation in House Range, UT. With his work around the world on the Burgess Shale he is helping to resolve one of the great mysteries relating to the Cambrian Explosion; the mechanism for the precise preservation of these fossils. By collecting geochemical data from the many sites he has worked, he hypothesized that a combination of calcium carbonate deposits and lower levels of oxygen and sulfur in the Cambrian seas prevented the degradation of the fossils by microbes.

Gaines's hypothesis with Shanan Peters relating the Cambrian Explosion to the Great Unconformity was featured on the cover of Nature in 2012. Using geochemical and stratigraphic data from 830 locations across North America they found evidence that the Great Unconformity affected ocean chemistry such that it may have triggered the evolution of Biomineralization, an essential factor of diversification of the Cambrian Explosion.

In 2021, Gaines's work on the fossil records of early animal life was honored by the official naming of a species of hurdiid radiodont he helped to discover, Titanokorys gainesi. This bizarre species of stem-arthropod lived approximately 508 million years ago and was one of the largest animals known to have existed in its time. It was dubbed "the mothership" by the press because of the animals massive frontal carapace (which covered almost half of the animals body). The findings were published in the peer-reviewed Journal, Royal Society Open Science.

== Awards, honors, fellowships, and grants ==
	Institution	Title	Year
Awards	Pomona College	Wig Distinguished Professorship Award for Excellence in Teaching	2007 & 2013

== Involvement in the Arts ==
Robert Gaines has a deep love and appreciation of experimental art, especially music. In 2022 at 2220 arts and archives in Los Angeles celebrating the 40th anniversary of Touch, Gaines gave a keynote lecture on the connections he sees between geological time and the sonic and visual output of UK's legendary publishers. Playing sound selections and showing photography by Jon Wozencroft, Gaines showed how he was inspired to think conceptually about his work as well as scientifically. Gaines is a founding donor to The Philip Jeck Foundation, which raises funds and distributes grants to artists whose work reflects the experimental approach of Philip Jeck. He also contributed field recordings to Birchville Cat Motel’s “Chi Vampires” and “The Frog Prince“.
