= George W. Wilson (politician) =

American politician

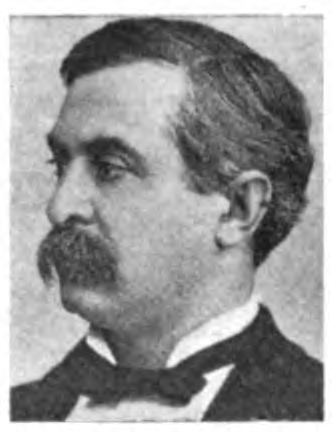

Member of the U.S. House of Representatives from Ohio's 7th district
- In office March 4, 1893 – March 3, 1897
- Preceded by: William E. Haynes
- Succeeded by: Walter L. Weaver

Member of the Ohio House of Representatives from the Madison County district
- In office January 1, 1872 – January 4, 1874
- Preceded by: W. M. Beach
- Succeeded by: R. C. McCloud

Member of the Ohio Senate from the 11th district
- In office January 7, 1878 – January 4, 1880
- Preceded by: William R. Warnock
- Succeeded by: Thomas J. Pringle

Personal details
- Born: George Washington Wilson; February 22, 1840 Brighton, Ohio, US
- Died: November 25, 1909 (aged 69) London, Ohio, US
- Resting place: Kirkwood Cemetery
- Party: Republican

George Washington Wilson (February 22, 1840 – November 25, 1909) was an American lawyer, politician, and veteran of the Civil War who served two terms as a U.S. representative from Ohio from 1893 to 1897.

== Biography ==
Wilson was born in Brighton, Ohio, and attended the common schools and Antioch College, Yellow Springs, Ohio.

=== Civil War ===
On August 8, 1862, he enlisted in the Ninety-fourth Regiment, Ohio Volunteer Infantry and was commissioned second lieutenant. While with First Regiment, United States Veteran Volunteer Engineers, he was promoted to First Lieutenant July 2, 1864, and afterward captain. He mustered out of the service October 1, 1865.

=== Early career ===
He studied law and was admitted to the bar on August 7, 1866, and practiced in London, Ohio. He served as prosecuting attorney of Madison County from 1866 to 1870, a member of the Ohio House of Representatives from 1871 to 1874, and served in the Ohio State Senate from 1877 to 1881.

=== Congress ===
Wilson was elected as a Republican to the Fifty-third and Fifty-fourth Congresses (March 4, 1893 – March 3, 1897).

=== Later career ===
After that, he resumed the practice of law in London, Ohio and served as delegate to the 1896 Republican National Convention, mayor of New London and prosecuting attorney of Madison County.

=== Death and burial ===
He died in London, Ohio, November 25, 1909, and was interred in Kirkwood Cemetery.

U.S. House of Representatives
Preceded by William E. Haynes	Member of the U.S. House of Representatives from Ohio's 7th congressional district March 4, 1893–March 3, 1897	Succeeded by Walter L. Weaver
