= Bessemer Academy =

Segregation academy in Alabama, United States

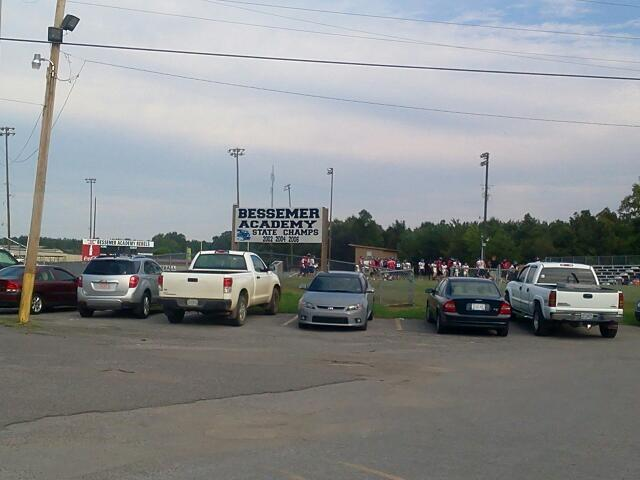

Location
- Bessemer, Alabama; Jefferson County; 33.3549°N 86.9919°W

Information
- Type: Private
- Religious affiliation: Non-denominational
- Founded: 1969
- Grades: PK-12
- Athletics conference: Alabama Independent School Association
- Nickname: Rebels
- Accreditation: SACS CASI (Cognia)
- Website: www.bessemeracademy.com

Bessemer Academy is a private, non-denominational K–12 school in Bessemer, Alabama, founded in 1969 as a segregation academy.

== Description ==
Bessemer Academy opened during the period of desegregation of public schools in the 1960s, and was established in 1969 as an all-White academy. According to the school, parents shared their desires for a school in Bessemer, "where children could receive a challenging curriculum within a framework of traditional values".

Facilities built in 1972 include 18 classrooms, an activity room and dressing rooms, as well as administrative offices.

Because a stream runs through campus, the school has implemented the Exploring Alabama’s Living Streams (EALS) curriculum.

== History ==
The first headmaster was Barry Norton, who also became a football coach.

The school moved into a new $200,000 building in August 1972. Enrollment in the first few years increased from 80 students in the first year, to 300 students in grades 1 through 9 in the 1971–72 school year, with an anticipated 400 students in the new building the following year in grades 1 through 11.

In 1972, the academy chose a "Confederate Rebel" Mascot, named after confederate soldiers in the U.S. Civil War. By 2000, enrollment had declined, and because the school was facing closure, Bessemer Academy sought to "... to recruit African American students to the school, namely, African American athletes. ...To provide a more inviting environment to athletes, Bessemer Academy toned-down its Confederate imagery leading toward athletic advancement and enrollment increases".

Running the Race began filming at Bessemer in October 2016. Head football coach Josh Wright allowed actors on the field with the team during a game. The film's producer cited Alabama's advantageous taxes as the incentive for shooting the film there.

== Athletics ==
Bessemer Academy competes in sports within the Alabama Independent School Association, which provides for competitions between the member schools.

The school has won 3 AISA football championships, 2 AISA basketball championships, 1 volleyball championship, and 1 AISA softball championship.
