= Montgomery Academy (Alabama) =

Private school in Montgomery, Alabama, US

The Montgomery Academy

Location
- 1550 Perry Hill Road (K–5); 3240 Vaughn Road (6–12); Montgomery, Alabama 36106; United States; 32°21′07″N 86°15′36″W

Information
- Type: Private
- Motto: The Pursuit of Excellence
- Established: 1959 (67 years ago)
- CEEB code: 011897
- Faculty: 95.8
- Grades: K-12
- Enrollment: 858
- Colors: Cardinal and navy
- Athletics: Baseball, Basketball, Cheerleading, Cross Country, Football, Golf, Soccer, Softball, Swimming, Tennis, Track and Field, and Volleyball
- Mascot: Eagle
- Website: www.montgomeryacademy.org

The Montgomery Academy is a non-sectarian independent day school located in Montgomery, Alabama. The Lower School accommodates kindergarten through fourth grade and the Upper School fifth through twelfth. The school's current total enrollment is just under 900, of which approximately 300 are in the Upper School. Montgomery Academy was founded in 1959 as a segregation academy.

== History ==
=== Background ===
In December 1958 the Montgomery Improvement Association (MIA) sued the city of Montgomery to force an end to racial segregation in the city's public parks. Rather than accede to this demand the city closed down all of its parks, including the Montgomery Zoo, effective on January 1, 1959. In response to this, Martin Luther King Jr. on behalf of the MIA, announced that the Association would attempt to end racial segregation in Montgomery public schools by having large numbers of black children apply for admission to white schools in order to provide test cases which might allow a judge to declare the Alabama Pupil Placement Act unconstitutional. Governor John Patterson threatened to shut down the public schools to prevent their integration and the Ku Klux Klan leader Robert Shelton promised that the Klan was prepared to prevent integration by violent means if necessary.

=== Founding ===
It was against this backdrop that the Montgomery Academy was founded in 1959 as a segregation academy by Robert Schoenhof Weil, Montgomery physician Hugh MacGuire, and a "group of white social leaders" for "boys and girls of white parentage." It was reported that "desegregation was one of the issues discussed in" the Academy's "formation in the mid-50s", although it was not possible to determine if that was the only factor that led to its founding.

The first classes were held in the former governor's mansion on the corner of South Perry Street & South Street (now demolished). Governor John Patterson sold the former governor's mansion to the school at a deeply discounted price of $27,505, half of its original 1906 price. G. Orum Hammer was hired as the first Headmaster for The Montgomery Academy. Initially, students were in "forms" (grades) 1 through 6. The initial 1959-60 "6th Form" constituted the first graduating class in 1966.

Although most segregation academies had markedly deficient curricula, the Montgomery Academy was one of a small number with accreditation, "complete academic programs," and "competent staffs." For instance, already by 1961 the Montgomery Academy's René Lévêque was chairman of the examination committee for the French I section of the National French Contest, sponsored since 1936 by the American Association of Teachers of French. By 1967 Jim Leeson stated that the school had "changed its role to be that of a preparatory school."

=== 1970s and after ===
For the first two decades of its existence The Montgomery Academy did not admit any African American students. In 1970 the Academy adopted an explicit policy stating that race would not be considered in admissions as required by Internal Revenue Service regulations. According to then-headmaster James Adams, although there had previously been no written statement to that effect, the Academy had never used race as a basis for admissions.

At its founding the Academy didn't have the financial resources to build its own football field or other athletic facilities. However, the city of Montgomery allowed the school and three other segregation academies (the Saint James School, the Stephens-Spears School, and the Central Alabama Academy) to use athletic facilities at the city's public schools. In 1972, federal Judge Frank M. Johnson, whose son John was a student at the Montgomery Academy, enjoined the city from continuing this practice, writing that "In allowing private academies to use city facilities, Montgomery is providing aid to private, segregated schools, thus facilitating their establishment and operation as an alternative for white students who in most instances are seeking to avoid desegregated public schools". The school didn't enroll its first Black student until 1973.

In 1976 the Academy, along with the Saint James School, was named in a suit filed against United States Secretary of the Treasury William Simon and Commissioner of Internal Revenue Donald C. Alexander by five women from Montgomery charging that the two men had encouraged the development of segregated schools by allowing them tax-deductible status. The school was identified as a discriminatory institution by the plaintiffs in Allen v. Wright, a lawsuit by black parents that was decided in 1984 by the U.S. Supreme Court.

Archie Douglas, a previous headmaster of The Montgomery Academy, said in 2004 that he believed the school was started in reaction to desegregation and "that those who resented the civil rights movement or sought to get away from it took refuge in the academy." He noted that the school, by 2004, had a philosophy of openness and did not discriminate with regard to race. As of 2014, the student body of The Montgomery Academy is more than 10% percent non-white. In June 2020, during the protests that followed the murder of George Floyd, headmaster John McWilliams said, "We must be willing to confront the uncomfortable fact that The Montgomery Academy, like many other independent schools founded in the South during the late 1950s, was not immune to the divisive forces of racism that shaped this city and community over the course of its history".

== Facilities ==
The Montgomery Academy's first home was in a historic mansion, built in 1906, and serving as the official residence of Alabama's governor between 1911 and 1950 which was torn down to make way for Interstate 85.

In 1963, the school relocated to a new site on Vaughn Road, now the premises of the Middle and Upper Schools. As student body size steadily grew, the initial twelve classrooms and lunchroom/auditorium were supplemented by seven classrooms and a library in 1965, four classrooms and a gymnasium in 1966, five classrooms in 1967, and three Montessori areas in 1971.

The Perry Hill Road Campus for the Lower School, which by that time included "Form K" (Kindergarten), was opened in the late 1980s. In 1996 the Vaughn Road campus added the 10,000-square-foot (930 m^{2}) Garzon Library, designed by local architects Seay Seay and Litchfield. The library's central octagonal rotunda establishes a focal landmark for the Upper School Campus.

The firm was then later contracted to design a new building, the Mary Katherine Archibald Blount Upper School, as well as a pedestrian bridge connecting the academic campus with newly built athletic fields across the busy Vaughn Road. These fields included new baseball, softball, and soccer fields. Previously, the land which is now the athletic campus had been an immense lawn for a Masonic retirement home.

In the summer of 2007, the school began a renovation, completed in 2009, of the old Mead Hall, which includes James W. Wilson Jr. Theater, as well as facilities for the forensics and drama programs. The project also includes Sahlie Upper School Commons, an extension to the existing Upper School Building, as well as a state-of-the-art track and field facility around the Hutchinson Soccer Field. The track was built by the same company that was contracted to install the track for the 2008 Beijing Summer Olympics.

== Academics ==
The Montgomery Academy's curriculum is entirely college preparatory, with more than 85 different high school course choices in nine disciplines. Students must carry at least five academic courses at all times. Thirty AP and honors sections are offered in all core areas. Students from The Montgomery Academy have also been involved in projects in recent years to promote racial harmony and to document Montgomery's links to the Civil Rights Movement.

The Academy is accredited by the Southern Association of Colleges and Schools and is a member of the National Association of Independent Schools and the Alabama Association of Independent Schools.

== Athletics ==
The school's athletics teams and squadrons are nicknamed the Eagles and the school colors are cardinal red and navy blue. The school competes with other Alabama high schools, both public and private, in the Alabama High School Athletic Association. Montgomery Academy has 2 primary athletic rivals in the city of Montgomery: Trinity Presbyterian School and St. James School. These three schools also compete in the Capital City Conference, which is a collection of the five private schools in the city of Montgomery that compete in the AHSAA. The CCC also includes city rivals Alabama Christian Academy and Montgomery Catholic Preparatory School, and formerly included St. Jude Educational Institute.

Two thirds of the Academy's middle and high school students participate in athletics. The Academy was recognized as the leader in 3A varsity sports for both boys and girls by the Birmingham News, and in 2013 the Montgomery Academy became the tenth school competing in the AHSAA to win at least 50 team state championships. During the 2012-2014 school years, Montgomery Academy competed in class 2A due to a decline in school population, before moving back up to Class 3A for the 2014-2016 school years. From 2018-2026, select athletic teams competed in larger classes due to the AHSAA's new "competitive balance rule." These sports at various times included football, track and field, tennis, and soccer. From May 2021 until May 2025, the girls' soccer team held the record for most state championships in AHSAA history. Beginning in 2026, Montgomery Academy competed in the AHSAA’s Single-A Private class following the AHSAA’s Private-Public School classification split.

=== Championships ===
The school has won a number of state championships, including:

- Baseball (1981)
- Boys’ Basketball (2025, 2026)
- Girls' Basketball (1999)
- Cheerleading (1993)
- Boys' Cross Country (2002, 2013, 2014, 2025)
- Girls' Cross Country (2006, 2008, 2009, 2011, 2012, 2013, 2024, 2025)
- Football (1987)
- Boys' Golf (2003, 2004, 2005, 2006, 2007, 2008, 2010, 2011, 2012, 2026)
- Boys’ Soccer (2025)
- Girls' Soccer (2001, 2011, 2012, 2014, 2015, 2017, 2018, 2019, 2021)
- Boys' Tennis (1997, 1998, 1999, 2001, 2002, 2003, 2004, 2005, 2007, 2011, 2012, 2013, 2014, 2015, 2016, 2019, 2021)
- Girls' Tennis (1971, 1997, 1998, 1999, 2000, 2001, 2002, 2004, 2008, 2009, 2010, 2011, 2012, 2013, 2015, 2016, 2017, 2019)
- Girls' Track and Field (2006, 2013, 2014)
- Volleyball (1986, 2005, 2006, 2013, 2018, 2019, 2020, 2023, 2026).

== Notable students and faculty ==
- Dick Brewbaker, former member of the Alabama State Senate
- Artur Davis, four term member of the United States House of Representatives, attended Montgomery Academy for two years
- Robert R. Gaines, American geologist and college administrator, class of 1991
- Sarah Catherine Hook, Actress
- R. Austin Huffaker Jr., United States district judge for the U.S. District Court for the Middle District of Alabama, class of 1992
- Jason Sanford, science fiction author and editor
- Josh Thomas, American football safety for the Buffalo Bills of the National Football League (NFL)
