= Southern Preparatory Academy =

Private Preparatory School in Camp Hill, Alabama

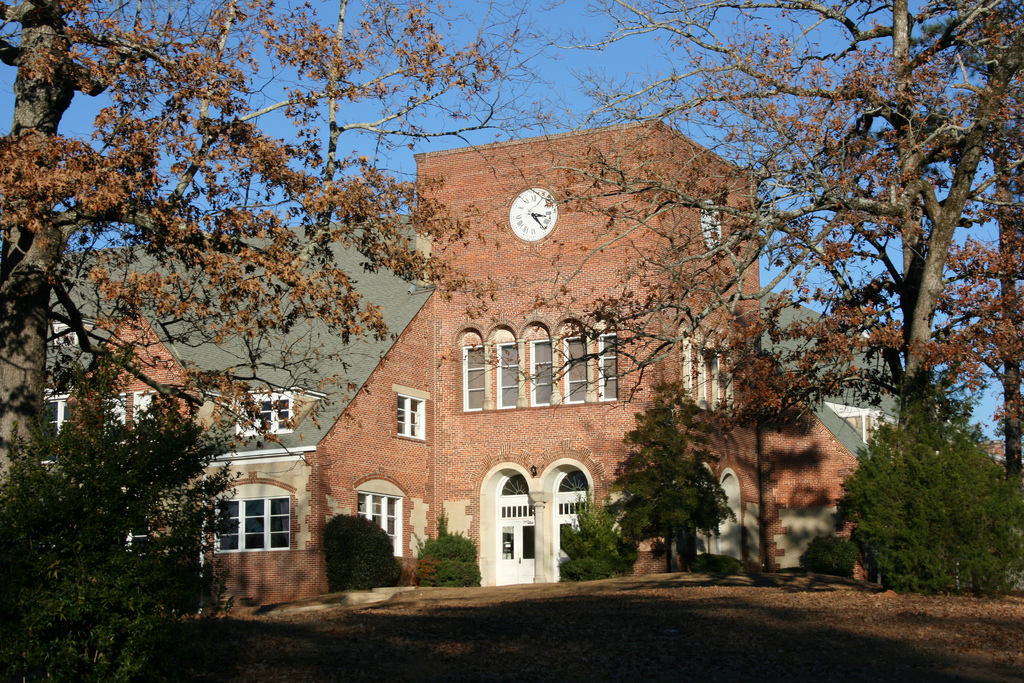

Location
- 174 Ward Circle; Camp Hill, Alabama 36850; United States; 32.8029°N 85.6607°W

Information
- Former name: Lyman Ward Military Academy
- Type: Preparatory
- Established: 1898
- School district: Alabama Independent School Association
- President: Colonel Corey Ramsby
- Dean: Blaine Thompson
- Staff: 55
- Faculty: 25
- Grades: 7-12
- Enrollment: 130
- Colors: Navy blue and metallic gold
- Athletics: Football, Cheer, Basketball, Soccer, Baseball, Cross Country, Golf, Track & Field, Wrestling, Tennis
- Athletics conference: Alabama Independent School Association (Division 2-A)
- Mascot: Rangers
- Affiliations: Alabama Independent School Association
- Website: southernprepacademy.org

Southern Preparatory Academy is a college preparatory day and boarding school, providing a structured, challenging environment with the aim of teaching students in three ways: academical, physical, and moral. Southern Prep is located in Camp Hill, Alabama, and educates students in grades 7-12. The day school is co-ed while the boarding is all-male.

== History ==
Dr. Lyman Ward founded the academy in 1898 as a non-profit, non-denominational institution for the rural youth of Alabama. The school is located about 20 miles from Auburn. The original purpose was to provide a secondary education for those with the ability to learn, the willingness to work, and in turn better themselves. In 1901, the State of Alabama granted Ward a charter incorporating the school with the name, The Southern Industrial Institute, Inc.

In 1948, Ward's death led to the establishment of a military department. The school then changed its name to Lyman Ward Military Academy in honor of its founder.

In 1966, the school became a member of the JROTC program by the Department of the Army.

In 1972, the school received its first accreditation from the Southern Association of Colleges and Schools, which it still has.

In 2019, Lyman Ward Military Academy changed its name to Southern Preparatory Academy and remains a JROTC honor unit of distinction. The academy is focused on college preparation and has added programs to include drone certification, private pilot training, a flight simulator and welding. In 2025, Southern Prep expanded and now offers both co-ed day student and all-boys boarding pathways. Day students, both male and female, have the option to participate in the school's JROTC program.

== Campus ==
Southern Prep is located on 330 acres (1.3 km^{2}) of land. Facilities include two athletic fields, a parade field, two 5-acre (20,000 m^{2}) lakes (Lake Mary and Lake Ann), a tennis court, three dormitories, an indoor swimming pool, two gymnasiums, indoor and outdoor rifle ranges, auditorium and chapel.

The Tallapoosa Hall is constructed of wood. In October 2007 the Hall was added to Alabama's Historic Landmarks register by the Alabama Historical Commission.

== Tuition ==
Tuition fees for domestic boarding students starts at $35,000.00. Tuition fees for day students begin at $7,500.00. As of 2025, Southern Preparatory Academy is also a CHOOSE Act school.

== Academics ==
Southern Prep is on a year-long schedule with the student load for grades 9-12 consisting of eight courses per year. Students take final exams for their first four classes of the year before winter break and begin their following four classes in the second semester.

In keeping with the requirements of the State of Alabama, students are required to have four years of English, Math, History, and Science. Other courses are offered as electives. Qualified sophomores, juniors, and seniors are eligible to take honors and dual enrollment classes. A student can earn 6 to 8 credits per year. A student must have 26-28 credits to graduate, depending on the diploma type.

Junior High School (grades 7–8) are also on a year-long class schedule.

== Student Life ==
=== Drum Corps ===
The Southern Prep Drum Corps consists of 3-10 cadets led by the Drum Major. The three types of drums the Drum Corps plays include snare, bass drum, and quads. The Drum Corps perform with the Color Guard, the Drill Team, and occasionally the Drum Corps performs with the Sword Drill team. The Drum Corps also performs in every parade the academy participates in, most notably the Birmingham Veterans Day parade.

=== Homecoming ===
Each year, Homecoming activities are held throughout the designated weekend. Special activities include a Homecoming Court with the crowning of the Homecoming Queen at the Friday Night Football game.

=== Drill Team ===
The Drill Team is open to all cadets in 9-12th grade and competes in several state and national competitions throughout the school year. Drill Team consists of 16 cadets and is led by two cadets, assigned as Drill Team Commander, and Deputy Drill Commander.

=== Rifle Team ===
The Rifle Team is open to all cadets 9-12th grade who have a desire to compete on a high school level with air rifles. The Rifle Team shoots in the sporter division and competes with Daisy 853 air rifles. The rifle team competes in the Alabama Northeast Area JROTC Rifle League. The teams compete in a 3-position league which consists of the prone, kneeling, and standing positions from 33 feet (10 m). The team competes every year in the Auburn University War Eagle Invitational where schools from Alabama, Tennessee, Georgia, and Florida compete for two days in the air rifle competitions.

=== Color Guard ===
The Southern Prep Color Guard is open to all cadets from 9th to 12th grade who are in the appropriate height range. The Color Guard competes in the Armed Color Guard Category and competes each year in different JROTC competitions around the state. The Color Guard performs a variety of activities on campus including Posting the Colors at all home sporting events, all promotion ceremonies, and scrub graduations. The Color Guard also carries the colors at all on and off-campus parades.

=== Sword Drill ===
The Sword Drill Team contains 16 cadets, as well as a deputy commander and a commander. Sword Drill is open to all cadets in 9th-11th grade. Sword Drill members sacrifice their nightly free time for several months to learn the Sword Drill Performance, which is passed down by the cadets from year to year, with no staff or faculty involvement. The Sword Drill Team typically performs only once, at the end of the year on Military Day.

=== Band ===
The Southern Prep Band program allowed students to take band classes designed to improve their individual and ensemble performing skills. As of 2021, the Band program has been shut down. Past performances by the Lyman Ward Band include participation in the Talladega 500(1980–1990), Mardi Gras(1980–1986), the national Veterans Day parade in Birmingham, Alabama (1980–2012), the Peanut Festival in Dothan, Alabama(1980–1990), as well as several command performances for the Governor of Alabama including the 2006 Inaugural Parade.

== Athletics ==
=== Football ===
The Rangers compete as an independent team playing both 8-man and 11-man football against both public and private teams mostly from Alabama and Georgia. Southern Prep currently has both a Varsity and Junior Varsity team.

Presently, the academy fields two teams - at the varsity (Senior School) level and one at the Junior Varsity (Junior School) level. The varsity teams are composed of student-athletes in grades 9–12; the Junior Varsity program is designed for student-athletes in grades 6–8. All teams play a full interscholastic schedule.

The varsity teams play a competitive 8–12 game schedule, with games beginning in mid-August and ending in mid-November. The Junior Varsity team plays a 10–12 game schedule.

=== Other sports ===
Baseball has been a Varsity sport at the academy since the Spring of 2010. A new on-campus baseball field was scheduled to be completed in time for the start of the 2014 baseball season. Southern Prep competes as a Class AAA member of the Alabama Independent School Association. Basketball practice begins in mid-to-late October and is open to all interested students.

Southern Prep was one of the first two high schools in the State of Alabama to field an interscholastic soccer team. Southern Prep was crowned as state champions in 2010 (AISA) with a 12-1-0 record and Area Champs in 2009. Southern Prep was the AISA State-Runner Up in 2023.

Southern Prep has a Varsity and Junior Varsity track and field team. Southern Prep has a Varsity and Junior Varsity cross country team. Southern Prep participates in the AISA league. Members practice on 1 mile, 3k, and 5k trails on campus.

== JROTC Cadet Formations ==
The Cadet Battalion is organized by rank and position. Leading the formation is the Battalion Commander. Behind the Battalion Commander is the Battalion Executive officer, then the Command Sergeant Major. There are three companies in the battalion, Alpha, Bravo, and Echo. The 3 companies are based on age, Alpha Company is made up of 11th grade and 12th grade, Bravo Company is made up of 10th grade and 9th grade, and Echo Company is made up of 6th grade, 7th grade, and 8th grade. The three companies compete for the Best Drilled Company award every time a parade takes place.

== Child abuse and bullying ==
In early 2005, Lyman Ward Military Academy was sued for alleged abuse committed by staff and senior students. There were eight lawsuits alleging hazing and abuse by senior cadets and school officials. In April 2005, media reported that the school had settled with the students involved.

In 2007, Walter Edward Myer - a former camp director at the school - was imprisoned for twenty years for committing child sexual abuse against students in the 1990s. Myer had been indicted in 1996 but fled to Costa Rica and remained missing until his arrest there in 2005. Myer was identified as a result of publicity on the Oprah Winfrey Show, identifying him as a "most wanted" fugitive.
