= Josh Thomas (safety) =

American football player (born 1996)

Profile
- Position: Safety

Personal information
- Born: November 19, 1996 (age 29); Montgomery, Alabama, U.S.
- Listed height: 6 ft 0 in (1.83 m)
- Listed weight: 205 lb (93 kg)

Career information
- High school: The Montgomery Academy (Montgomery, Alabama)
- College: Appalachian State
- NFL draft: 2020: undrafted

Career history
- Buffalo Bills (2020–2021); Arizona Cardinals (2022–2023)*; Carolina Panthers (2023)*
- * Offseason or practice squad member only

Awards and highlights
- Second-team All-Sun Belt (2019)

Career NFL statistics
- Games played: 4
- Total tackles: 5
- Stats at Pro Football Reference

Joshua Terrell Thomas (born November 19, 1996) is an American professional football safety. He was signed by the Buffalo Bills as an undrafted free agent in 2020 following his college football career at Appalachian State.

== Early life ==
Thomas was born in Montgomery, Alabama and attended The Montgomery Academy where he was a two-time All-State player in football, a four-timer in basketball and became the city's all-time leading boys basketball scorer.

== College career ==
As a senior, Thomas recorded a career-high 72 tackles along with 2.0 tackles for loss, one fumble return for 37 yards and one interception return for a 16-yard touchdown. He was a two-time team captain and started 30 of 56 games.

== Professional career ==
Pre-draft measurables
Height	Weight	Arm length	Hand span
5 ft 11 1/4 in (1.81 m)	212 lb (96 kg)	29 7/8 in (0.76 m)	9 3/8 in (0.24 m)
All values from Pro Day

=== Buffalo Bills ===
Thomas signed with the Buffalo Bills as an undrafted free agent following the 2020 NFL draft on May 8, 2020. He was waived during final roster cuts on September 5, 2020, and signed to the team's practice squad the next day. He was elevated to the active roster on October 31 and November 14 for the team's weeks 8 and 10 games against the New England Patriots and Arizona Cardinals, and reverted to the practice squad after each game. He was placed on the practice squad/COVID-19 list by the team on December 28, 2020, and restored to the practice squad four days later. On January 26, 2021, Thomas signed a reserves/futures contract with the Bills.

On August 31, 2021, Thomas was waived by the Bills and re-signed to the practice squad the next day. After the Bills were eliminated in the Divisional Round of the 2021 playoffs, he signed a reserve/future contract on January 24, 2022. He was waived on August 29, 2022.

=== Arizona Cardinals ===
On September 1, 2022, Thomas was signed to the Arizona Cardinals practice squad. He signed a reserve/future contract on January 11, 2023. He was released on June 14, 2023.

=== Carolina Panthers ===
On June 15, 2023, Thomas was claimed off waivers by the Carolina Panthers. He was waived on August 26, 2023.
