= B. J. Wallace =

American baseball player

- Pitcher
- Born: May 18, 1971 (age 54); Mobile, Alabama, U.S.
- Bats: Right Throws: Left
- Stats at Baseball Reference

Billy Lyle "B. J." Wallace, Jr. (born May 18, 1971) is an American former professional baseball pitcher. He played college baseball for Mississippi State University and pitched for the United States national baseball team in the 1992 Summer Olympics, where he set an Olympic record for strikeouts in one game.

Wallace was selected in the first round of the 1992 Major League Baseball (MLB) Draft by the Montreal Expos. However, he retired in 1997 without reaching MLB.

== Career ==
Wallace attended Robertsdale High School and later attended Monroe Academy in Monroeville, Alabama. Out of high school, the Boston Red Sox selected Wallace in the 20th round of the 1989 Major League Baseball draft. He attended college rather than turn professional. Wallace attended Mississippi State University, where he played college baseball for the Mississippi State Bulldogs baseball team, competing in the Southeastern Conference (SEC) of the National Collegiate Athletic Association's (NCAA) Division I. There, he set a Mississippi State school record with 145 career strikeouts, besting the previous record set by Jeff Brantley. In 1991, he was named to the All-SEC's first team, and played collegiate summer baseball for the Anchorage Glacier Pilots of the Alaska Baseball League, a member league of the National Baseball Congress. He led the 1992 Bulldogs to the NCAA Mideast Regional tournament.

He participated in the 1992 Summer Olympics, as a member of the United States national baseball team. In a win over the Italian national team, Wallace recorded 14 strikeouts, setting an Olympic record. The United States finished fourth in the competition.

After the Olympics, Wallace was drafted by the Montreal Expos in the first round of the 1992 Major League Baseball draft, with the third overall selection. He received a signing bonus of $550,000. Noted for their player development success, the Expos passed on Jeffrey Hammonds due to salary demands. The Expos' selection of Wallace was criticized as a "money" pick, as Wallace did not request as high a signing bonus as Hammonds or Derek Jeter, who remained available to the Expos when they chose Wallace.

Wallace played minor league baseball for the Expos. He pitched for the West Palm Beach Expos of the Class-A Advanced Florida State League (FSL) in 1993. He had an 11-8 win–loss record and 3.28 earned run average with 126 strikeouts in 137 innings pitched, and was named a midseason FSL All-Star. Heading into the 1994 season, Baseball America rated Wallace as the 94th best prospect in baseball. He was promoted to the Harrisburg Senators of the Class-AA Eastern League in 1994, but he struggled and was limited by injuries. He did not pitch during the 1995 season. The Philadelphia Phillies selected Wallace in the Rule 5 draft. He cleared waivers and signed a minor league contract with the Phillies for the 1996 season, pitching for the Clearwater Phillies of the FSL. The Red Sox signed Wallace as a free agent, but released him in spring training in 1997.

In 2003, he served as an assistant baseball coach at Gulf Shores High School, which reached the Class 4A state championship series.

== Personal ==
Wallace and his wife, Amber Sheree McKenzie, have three children.

Wallace has had run ins with law enforcement. In 2003, Wallace was involved in a fatal car crash, which resulted in his being charged with driving under the influence of alcohol. Though his breathalyzer result was within the legal limit, police officers used their discretion in making the arrest. He was acquitted. In 2011, Wallace and his wife were arrested for the manufacturing of a controlled substance, possession of a controlled substance and possession of drug paraphernalia. The substance was reportedly methamphetamine.
