= Lewis Colbert =

American football player (born 1963)

No. 5
- Position: Punter

Personal information
- Born: August 23, 1963 (age 63); Phenix City, Alabama, U.S.
- Listed height: 5 ft 11 in (1.80 m)
- Listed weight: 182 lb (83 kg)

Career information
- High school: Glenwood (Phenix City)
- College: Auburn
- NFL draft: 1986: 8th round, 196th overall pick

Career history
- Kansas City Chiefs (1986–1987); Atlanta Falcons (1988)*; San Diego Chargers (1989)
- * Offseason or practice squad member only

Awards and highlights
- First-team All-American (1985)

Career NFL statistics
- Punts: 117
- Punt yards: 4,676
- Longest punt: 56
- Stats at Pro Football Reference

Lewis Welton Colbert (born August 23, 1963) is an American former professional football player who was a punter in the National Football League (NFL).

Colbert was born and raised in Phenix City, Alabama and played scholastically at Glenwood Academy. He played collegiately at Auburn, where he was a first-team All-America selection as a senior.

Colbert was selected by the Kansas City Chiefs in the eighth round of the 1986 NFL draft. He was the Chiefs full time punter in 1986, but only spent two games with them the following year. He joined the San Diego Chargers in 1989, but again only appeared in two games.
