= Chad Mottola =

American baseball player and coach (born 1971)

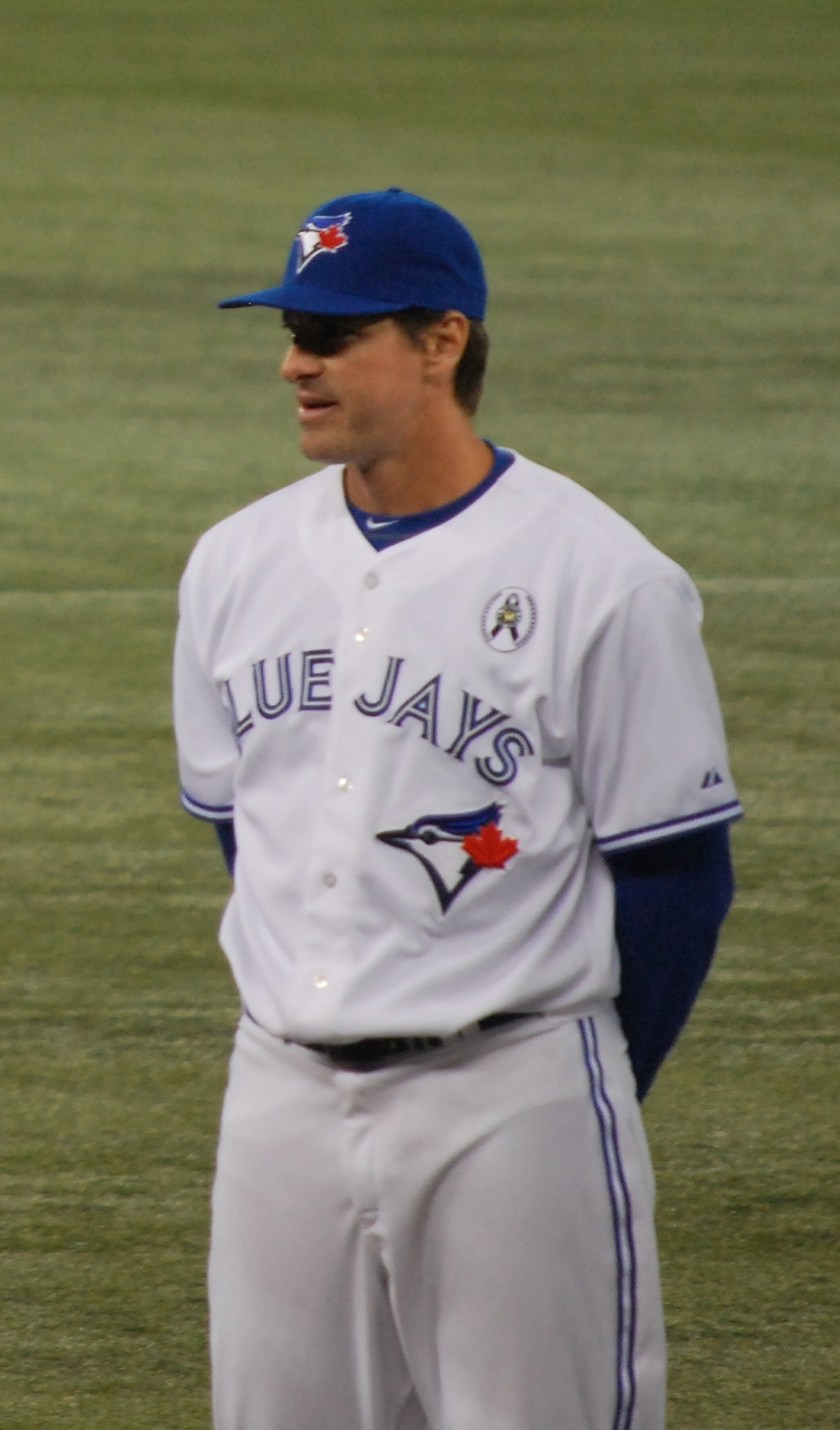
- Mottola as Blue Jays hitting coach in 2013

Tampa Bay Rays – No. 51
- Outfielder / Coach
- Born: October 15, 1971 (age 55); Augusta, Georgia, U.S.
- Batted: Right Threw: Right

MLB debut
- April 23, 1996, for the Cincinnati Reds

Last MLB appearance
- July 26, 2006, for the Toronto Blue Jays

MLB statistics
- Batting average: .200
- Home runs: 4
- Runs batted in: 12
- Stats at Baseball Reference

Teams
- As player: Cincinnati Reds (1996); Toronto Blue Jays (2000); Florida Marlins (2001); Baltimore Orioles (2004); Toronto Blue Jays (2006); As coach: Toronto Blue Jays (2013); Tampa Bay Rays (2016–present)

Charles Edward "Chad" Mottola (born October 15, 1971) is an American professional baseball coach and a former player. He is currently the hitting coach for the Tampa Bay Rays of Major League Baseball (MLB).

Mottola is an alumnus of the University of Central Florida (UCF), where he played college baseball for the UCF Knights. A highly regarded prospect, Mottola was selected by the Cincinnati Reds with the fifth overall selection of the 1992 MLB draft, one spot ahead of Derek Jeter.

Mottola played in MLB for five years as an outfielder. Considered a journeyman, he played professionally from 1992 through 2007, appearing in 59 MLB games and 1,801 minor league games. Mottola played in minor league baseball for different organizations, receiving major league playing time with Cincinnati in 1996, the Toronto Blue Jays in 2000 and 2006, the Florida Marlins in 2001 and the Baltimore Orioles in 2004. As he received less playing time in 2007, he began to mentor younger teammates, which helped him transition into a coaching career. He was the hitting coach for Toronto during the 2013 season.

== Career ==
=== Amateur career ===
Mottola attended St. Thomas Aquinas High School in Fort Lauderdale, Florida, graduating in 1989. After leading all Broward County high school players in batting average (.573), home runs (14) and runs batted in (RBIs) (48) as a senior, Mottola was named to Florida's Class 3A All-State first team. Out of high school, the Baltimore Orioles selected Mottola in the tenth round of the 1989 Major League Baseball draft, with the 243rd overall selection. Mottola did not sign with the Orioles, opting to pursue a college baseball career.

Mottola then enrolled at the University of Central Florida (UCF), which he chose to attend over the University of New Orleans, as it was closer to his home. At UCF, he played for the UCF Knights baseball team in NCAA Division I. As a freshman, he hit .321 in 57 games, but did not hit a home run. He gained 30 pounds (14 kg) for his sophomore season. As a sophomore, Mottola was named the American South Conference's Player of the Week on April 3, 1991, after batting .542 with one home run and eight RBIs in six games. During the season, he batted .343 with nine home runs and 54 RBIs. After the 1991 season, he played collegiate summer baseball with the Brewster Whitecaps of the Cape Cod Baseball League.

In his junior season, he batted .345 with 14 home runs, tying the UCF single-season record. Professional scouts considered him a first round prospect, due to his intelligence, size, ability to hit for power, his strong throwing arm, running speed, instincts and polish.

=== Professional career ===
The Cincinnati Reds drafted Mottola in the first round of the 1992 Major League Baseball draft with the fifth overall selection, one selection ahead of Derek Jeter. He signed with the Reds the day of the draft, receiving a signing bonus of $400,000, as he attended the United States national baseball team tryouts for the 1992 Summer Olympics, and did not want to have his contract status on his mind during the tryouts. He was the first UCF athlete to be selected in the first round of an MLB draft.

In his first professional season, Mottola led the Billings Mustangs to the Pioneer League championship, batting .286 with 12 home runs and 37 runs batted in (RBIs). Baseball America rated Mottola as the 71st best prospect in baseball before the 1993 season. Playing a full season for the first time in 1993, he batted .280 for the Winston-Salem Spirits with 21 home runs and led the Class-A Advanced Carolina League with 91 RBIs. He was named a Carolina League All-Star outfielder after the 1993 season. Prior to the 1994 season, Baseball America rated Mottola as the 43rd best prospect in baseball.

Mottola started the 1995 season with the Chattanooga Lookouts of the Class-AA Southern League, receiving a promotion to the Class-AAA Indianapolis Indians of the International League that season. Despite his minor league success, Mottola's path to the Reds was blocked by outfielders Reggie Sanders, Curtis Goodwin, Eric Davis, Vince Coleman, Mike Kelly, Steve Gibraltar and Eric Anthony, all of whom the Reds had in spring training that season. General manager Jim Bowden commented that Mottola needed more minor league seasoning before he would be promoted to the Reds. He made his major league debut with the Cincinnati Reds on April 23, 1996. In 35 games for the Reds, Mottola batted .215 with three home runs and six RBIs. For Indianapolis, he batted .262 with 9 home runs, 47 RBIs and nine stolen bases in 102 games.

Though he was considered a top prospect, the Reds held him out of winter league baseball during the 1995–96 offseason. The Reds added Deion Sanders and Rubén Sierra to their outfield competition for the 1997 season, prompting Mottola to question the Reds commitment to him. After he spent the 1997 season in the minors, the Reds traded Mottola to the Texas Rangers for a player to be named later in April 1998. He spent most of the 1998 season with the Oklahoma City RedHawks of the Class-AAA Pacific Coast League (PCL), but suffered a broken thumb that required surgery, limiting his season.

Granted free agency after the 1998 season, Mottola signed with the Chicago White Sox for the 1999 season. He batted .321 with 164 hits, 32 doubles and 20 home runs for the Charlotte Knights. With the Syracuse SkyChiefs, the Class-AAA affiliate of the Toronto Blue Jays, in 2000, Mottola batted .309 in 134 games with 505 at-bats, 156 hits, 85 runs, 25 doubles, 3 triples, 33 home runs, 102 RBI, 37 walks, 30 stolen bases and 99 strikeouts. He led the league in home runs and also in slugging percentage, had the second highest RBI, was fourth in the league in hits and extra-base hits, and had the seventh highest batting average. He was named an International League All-Star outfielder in 2000, and won the International League Most Valuable Player Award. He was also named the Blue Jays minor league player of the year that season, and earned a promotion to the Blue Jays in September.

After the 2000 season, the Blue Jays traded Mottola to the Florida Marlins for a player to be named later or cash. He played for the Marlins' Class-AAA affiliate, the Calgary Cannons of the PCL, and appeared in five games for the Marlins. In 2002, Mottola returned to Syracuse. He began the 2003 season with the Tampa Bay Devil Rays organization, playing for the Class-AAA Durham Bulls, but was released. He signed with the Boston Red Sox on June 12 to replace Julio Zuleta, who had signed to play in Japan, on the Class-AAA Pawtucket Red Sox. Mottola signed with the Orioles for the 2004 season, splitting his time between MLB and the Class-AAA Ottawa Lynx. In 2005, he returned to the Blue Jays organization, playing with Syracuse. He was promoted to MLB in 2006, but spent the majority of the 2005 through 2007 seasons with Syracuse.

=== Transition to coaching ===
Mottola retired after the 2007 season. During his final seasons, Mottola began to play less and serve as a mentor to younger players, making for a transition into a coaching career. After the 2007 season, Mottola accepted a job as the hitting coach of the Gulf Coast Blue Jays of the Rookie-level Gulf Coast League. On October 6, 2008, Mottola was announced as the Blue Jays roving minor league hitting instructor for the 2009 season. From 2010 to 2012, he was the hitting coach for the Las Vegas 51s, Toronto's Triple-A affiliate at the time.

On November 24, 2012, Mottola was promoted to be the Toronto Blue Jays hitting coach for the 2013 season. On October 7, 2013, the Blue Jays announced that Mottola would not be returning for the 2014 season.

In November 2013, Mottola was hired by the Tampa Bay Rays as their minor-league hitting coordinator. The Rays promoted Mottola to become their major league hitting coach in September 2016.

== Personal life ==
Mottola was born in Augusta, Georgia, and grew up in Pembroke Pines, Florida. When Mottola signed with the Reds in 1992, he bought his parents a house. Mottola's father died of a heart attack at the age of 50 in October 1995. Mottola is of Italian descent.

Mottola met his wife, Emily, at UCF. She played for the school's volleyball team. They had a son in 2005 and a daughter in 2008.
