= Monroe Academy =

Segregation academy in Alabama

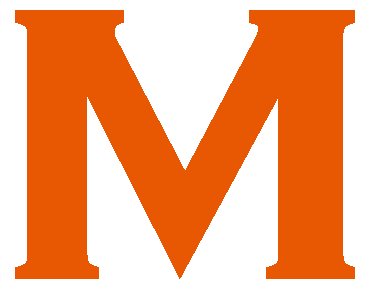

Location
- 4096 South Alabama Ave; Monroeville, Alabama, Monroe County 36460; United States; 31°28′29″N 87°20′28″W

Information
- School type: Private day school
- Established: 1969 (57 years ago)
- CEEB code: 011848
- Head of school: Stephen Matthew Coker
- Grades: K3 – 12
- Gender: Coeducational
- Age range: 3-18
- Colors: Orange and white
- Fight song: Dixie
- Mascot: Big Orange (Volunteer)
- Nickname: Volunteers
- Accreditation: Alabama Independent School Association
- Yearbook: The Volunteer
- Website: www.monroeacademy.org

Monroe Academy (often referred to as MA) is a private day school, accredited by the Alabama Independent School Association and the Southern Association of Colleges and Schools, which offers coeducational college preparatory classes for students from K-3 through grade 12.

Monroe Academy is located in Monroeville, Alabama and was founded in 1969 as a segregation academy. In 1969, the headmaster told the Atlanta Constitution that he was "sure the integration was one of the primary reasons for the school be established".

According to the Los Angeles Times, many parents struggled to afford the tuition and made financial sacrifices to avoid sending their children to racially integrated public schools. In 1982, Jerry Steele, Monroe Academy's first board chairman, stated that the school's lack of racial integration was because the school "is run by the people who put up the money."

The school has an enrollment of over 400 students, all of them white. As of 2022, although Monroe Academy has posted a non-discrimination policy on their website, there has yet to be a single black student admitted.

== Notable alumni ==
- B. J. Wallace - Olympics and minor league baseball player
