= School gun raffle =

A school gun raffle is a fund-raising technique used by schools in the United States. Winners must stipulate their eligibility to own a gun and take delivery from a participating gun shop.

A proposed raffle at Comeaux High School was cancelled after complaints from parents. Lucama Elementary School implemented a rule that students could not buy tickets.
