= Robert Schoenhof Weil =

- Born: November 29, 1919; Montgomery, Alabama
- Died: October 25, 2016 (aged 96); Montgomery, Alabama
- Education: Culver Military Academy; Dartmouth College; Harvard Business School
- Occupations: Businessman, philanthropist
- Spouse: Virginia (Loeb) Weil
- Children: 3
- Parent(s): Adolph Weil; Rossie (Schoenhof) Weil

Robert Schoenhof Weil (November 29, 1919 – October 25, 2016) was an American businessman and philanthropist who served as the Chairman of Weil Brothers Cotton, Inc.

== Biography ==
=== Early life ===
Robert Weil is one of four children of Adolph Weil and Rossie Weil (née Schoenhof). Adolph was a second generation partner and principal of Weil Brothers Cotton, Inc. Rossie was the daughter of a bookstore owner from Boston. Schoenhof's Foreign Books was founded in 1856. Located in Harvard Square, it is the oldest foreign-language bookseller in the United States. It is reputed as having been a rendezvous point of Longfellow, Ralph Waldo Emerson, and Thoreau. Regardless of whether this was the case, Carl Schoenhof, owner of Schoenhof books, took pride in corresponding regularly with Charles Dickens.

He graduated from Culver Military Academy at 16 and entered Dartmouth College in 1936. (He had skipped second and fourth grades.) In 1940, he began study at Harvard Business School. Upon completion of the business program, he joined the US Army as a second lieutenant.

=== Career ===
Weil joined Weil Brothers Cotton, Inc. not long after the end of the Second World War. At the time, he worked for his father and his uncle. By taking a position at WBCI, Weil joined his brother, Adolph Jr., as the third generation of Weils at the company. The two brothers were made to start as "squidges;" essentially janitors for the sample room. A sample room is a room in a cotton trading firm's building where cotton samples are handled and evaluated. A large amount of loose cotton makes its way to the floor and must be cleaned sometimes several times in a day. Weil's handling of the broom eventually changed into handling of samples and then into handling of accounts and sales. By 1949, he was making calls on mills overseas. And in 1968 he and Adolph Jr. took over the business as president and chairman, respectively.

He was president and Director of the American Cotton Shippers Association, and has served on the Boards of the Atlantic Cotton Association, the International Cotton Association, and the New Orleans Cotton Exchange. He has also served as a delegate to the National Cotton Council of America, International Federation of Cotton and Allied Textile Industries, the International Cotton Advisory Committee, and the White House Conference on Export Trade Expansion. He has worked with the United States Congress and the U.S. Department of Agriculture in developing legislation and cotton policy.

=== Philanthropy ===
His civic affairs background includes work with or philanthropy for: the American Cancer Society, Salvation Army, United Way, United Negro College Fund, Eye Foundation Hospital of Birmingham, St. Margaret's Hospital in Montgomery, Auburn University, Huntingdon College, Dartmouth College, and Wheaton College, Massachusetts. He is a founder of the Montgomery Academy. He serves on the Boards of Trustees of the Montgomery Museum of Fine Arts and the Montgomery Symphony Orchestra.

In 1994, he was named co-"Citizen of the Year" by the Montgomery Advertiser alongside his brother.

=== Personal life ===
He married Virginia Loeb of Montgomery, Alabama in January 1942; they had three children. He and his wife were members of Temple Beth Or in Montgomery, Alabama. He died in October 2016 at the age of 96.

== See also ==
- List of Auburn University people
