= Glenwood School (Alabama) =

Location
- Phenix City, Alabama; 32.5368744°N 85.0523226°W

Information
- Type: Private, day school
- Founded: 1970
- NCES School ID: 00000962
- Faculty: 45
- Grades: K-12
- Colors: Orange and White (Forest green may be used for highlights only.)
- Mascot: Gator
- Budget: $2,888,457
- Website: www.glenwoodgators.org

Glenwood School is a co-educational private school for pupils from grades K1 through 12. The school is located in Smiths Station, Alabama in southeastern Lee County. It serves 577 students. The school is accredited by both the Alabama Independent School Association and the Southern Association of Colleges and Schools. It was founded in 1970 as a segregation academy. In October 2023, it was announced that Glenwood would be joining the Alabama High School Athletic Association, along with three other AISA schools Autauga Academy, Lee-Scott Academy, and Pickens Academy starting with the 2024-25 school year. According to the AHSAA's website for the 2024-26 classifications, both Glenwood and Lee-Scott Academy would be in Class 3A while both Autauga Academy and Pickens Academy will be in Class 1A.

== History ==
Glenwood was founded in 1970. It was granted tax-exempt status in 1984. Glenwood Academy has been described as a segregation academy.

== Be healthy ==
Glenwood has an obesity prevention program.

== Traditions ==
Glenwood has a number of traditions that have been carried on over the years. Every autumn, it holds a harvest festival and a Thanksgiving luncheon, both of which are meant to be opportunities for family members to come visit their children at the school. In the spring, the elementary school holds a field day in which athletics are the main focus. Meanwhile, year round chapel sessions are held which serve to reinforce students' moral character.

== Notable alumni ==
- Tim Hudson MLB pitcher
- Lewis Colbert, punter for the Kansas City Chiefs
