= Glenwood School (Cissna Park, Illinois) =

- U.S. National Register of Historic Places
- Location within Illinois Location within the United States
- Location: 1398 East 800 North Rd., Cissna Park, Illinois
- Coordinates: 40°36′08″N 87°51′42″W
- Built: 1887
- NRHP reference No.: 100005232
- Added to NRHP: May 29, 2020

Glenwood School is a historic one-room schoolhouse at 1398 East 800 North Road in rural Ash Grove Township, Iroquois County, Illinois, near the village of Cissna Park. The school opened in 1887, shortly after compulsory public schooling laws in Illinois spurred a wave of rural school construction. The school's appearance is typical of vernacular one-room schoolhouses, with a rectangular plan, a symmetrical front facade with a gable, and an entrance vestibule leading into the classroom. Later changes to the school building, such as a heating system and concrete sidewalks, were likely the result of statewide school modernization efforts in the 1910s. Like most rural areas, Iroquois County consolidated its schools in the 1930s and 1940s, and the Glenwood School was a victim of this trend; a sign above its entrance suggests it closed in 1936. It is the only remaining one-room schoolhouse in Ash Grove Township, which once had nine public schools.

The schoolhouse was added to the National Register of Historic Places on May 29, 2020.
