= Saint James School (Montgomery, Alabama) =

Segregation academy in Alabama

Location
- 6010 Vaughn Road; Montgomery, Alabama 36116; United States; 32°20′17″N 86°12′25″W

Information
- Type: Independent day school
- Motto: Formally "We are Saint James School" Currently "We are Trojans, 24/7"
- Established: 1955 (71 years ago)
- CEEB code: 011904
- Head of school: Lawrence U. (Larry) McLemore
- Grades: K2-12
- Enrollment: 832
- Colors: Navy and gold
- Athletics conference: Capital City Conference; Alabama High School Athletic Association
- Mascot: Trojan
- Team name: Trojans
- Accreditation: Southern Association of Independent Schools; Cognia
- Newspaper: The Odyssey
- Website: www.stjmontgomery.org

Saint James School is an independent, nonsectarian, college preparatory school located in Montgomery, Alabama, United States. Established in 1955, Saint James School, Montgomery's oldest private school, serves more than 850 students in pre-kindergarten through grade 12.

== History ==
Saint James School began in 1955 as an independent elementary school, housed in Saint James United Methodist Church. In 1970, the school's enrollment doubled after the court ordered the desegregation of public schools. That same year, the school purchased property and opened a second campus, providing classrooms and facilities to meet the needs of a growing student body population including junior and high school students.

In 1972, a federal judge prohibited the city of Montgomery from allowing the school and three other private schools from using city recreational facilities, due to the fact that the schools in question either refused to admit black students by policy or claimed to accept black students and teachers but remained all white.

By 1974, Saint James School had 951 students enrolled in kindergarten through twelfth grade and graduated its first high school class. The two campuses united two years later.

In 1976 the Saint James School, along with the Montgomery Academy, was named in a suit filed against United States Secretary of the Treasury William Simon and Commissioner of Internal Revenue Donald C. Alexander by five black women from Montgomery charging that the two men had encouraged the development of segregated schools by allowing them tax-deductible status.

In 1982, the school leased a new facility on a 30-acre campus, in the city's booming eastern section, which would serve as key to the school's future development and expansion. In 1984, Winton Blount, benefactor of the Alabama Shakespeare Festival, endowed Saint James School the funds to build a Arts Building.

In 1991, a modern new high school building was constructed on the Vaughn Road campus, and after a devastating tornado destroyed the school's elementary site on Vaughn Road (in the early morning hours on March 6, 1996), more construction was soon underway. Within 18 months, a new campus greeted returning students. Designed and organized like a small college campus, the facilities included a middle school, a high school building, a gym, a performing arts building, as well as elementary buildings. Both Saint James campuses were consolidated at the Vaughn Road site in 2002-03, enabling the co-location of elementary, middle, and high schools all at one site.

Saint James School admits students of any race, religion, color, gender, creed, and national and ethnic origin. The school serves students from approximately 15 different countries each year.

== Athletics ==
Saint James School is a member of the Alabama High School Athletic Association. The school's athletic teams include baseball, fast pitch softball, basketball, cheerleading, dance, cross country, football, golf, soccer, tennis, track and field, volleyball, equestrian, and wrestling. Many students have gone on to play either college or professional sports, including Davis Daniel and Mervyl “MJ” Melendez (Major League Baseball) and Collin Duncan and KJ Jackson (NCAA football).

== Notable alumni ==
- KJ Jackson, college football quarterback for the Arkansas Razorbacks
- Anna M. Manasco, lawyer serving as a US district judge of the District Court for the Northern District of Alabama
