= Montgomery Zoo =

Zoo in Montgomery, Alabama, United States

Montgomery Zoo and Mann Wildlife Learning Museum

- Interactive map of Montgomery Zoo and Mann Wildlife Learning Museum
- 32.420128°N 86.277201°W
- Date opened: 1920, reopened May 6, 1972
- Location: Montgomery, Alabama
- Land area: 40 acres (16 ha)
- No. of animals: 750
- No. of species: 140
- Annual visitors: 240,000
- Memberships: Zoological Association of America
- Website: montgomeryzoo.com

Montgomery Zoo is a 40-acre (16 ha) zoo located on the north side of Montgomery, Alabama. The zoo is an independent city department, and is supported in part by The Montgomery Area Zoological Society. It is home to approximately 750 animals representing 140 species. After not renewing their Association of Zoos and Aquariums membership in 2013, the zoo opted to remain accredited solely by the Zoological Association of America. The Mann Wildlife Learning Museum opened in January 2003 and serves as the administration building. The museum features taxidermy displays with a focus on native wildlife, game species, and wildlife management.

== History ==
Elephant eating hay at the zoo

The Montgomery Zoo began as a small menagerie in 1920 in Oak Park in the Oak Park neighborhood, a residential district in Central, Montgomery. Initially started as a small children's zoo as a part of a local community park, the zoo housed alligators, monkeys, bears and assorted other animals. There was a small train and carousel for the children. The zoo closed down between 1960 and 1971 due to racial tensions, and an unwillingness to integrate.

In 1972, the Montgomery Zoo reopened at its current location. The zoo began with six acres, a small petting zoo for the children, assorted monkeys, a flight cage designed after the 1904 St. Louis World's Fair, and a chimpanzee named Benji. In 1976, the Montgomery Zoo hosted its first fundraising event entitled Zoo Day. This initial event grew to become an annual event and is now called Zoo Weekend. Today, an average Zoo Weekend will host as many as 18,000 guests.

In 1989, ground-breaking took place expanding the zoo to 40 acres. After two years of construction, the community welcomed a new zoo in 1991. Barrier-free and multi-species exhibits highlighted the expansion, as well as the zoo being divided into five continental realms: Africa, Australia, Asia, North America, and South America. Since then the zoo has continued to grow and expand. In 1992, the cougar and lynx exhibit was opened in North American realm, the Reptile House, jaguar, and ocelot exhibit were completed in South America; and the new chimpanzee and colobus monkey exhibits opened in the Africa realm. In 1993, the Bengal tiger exhibit opened in the Asian realm with one white and one orange tiger. In 1995, the bald eagle exhibit opened in North American realm and Monkey Island was completely renovated in South America. In 1996, the American black bear exhibit opened and the first baby cheetah was born. In 1998, the maned wolf and Indian rhino exhibits opened. In 1999, the new front gate entrance and gift shop opened. In 2003, the Mann Wildlife Learning Museum was completed and opened on zoo property. In 2004, the African elephant exhibit opened, housing three female elephants.

In March 2008, the North American river otter exhibit opened featuring two river otters and an additional habitat for an alligator snapping turtle. In June 2010, the zoo opened the Giraffe Encounter and feeding stations at the river otters and koi fish ponds. The following year, both the Parakeet Cove and Horse Trail Rides were added as animal encounters. In August 2012, the Zoofari Skylift Ride was completed. Two months later, the Birmingham Zoo's two male lions, Baron and Vulcan were displayed in their exhibit at the African realm. Two years later, these two lions were sent to Salt Lake City's Hogle Zoo to breed with Woodland Park Zoo's two lionesses.

The new American alligator habitat opened with four bachelor males in summer 2014.

== Exhibits ==
=== Australia ===
The Australian Realm is viewed from a boardwalk. Although it originally displayed Australian animals, it is currently in a state of redevelopment. This exhibit opened with red kangaroo, dama wallaby, parma wallaby, emu, black swan, cereopsis, radjah shelduck, and magpie goose. The small seasonal exhibit, which formerly housed warthogs and aardwolf, currently houses the red river hog.

Current occupants of this exhibit area include a walk-through interactive aviary for Budgerigar and Pygmy hippopotamus.

=== Asia ===
Indian rhinoceros

One of the central exhibits of the zoo is the large Asian Hoofstock yard. Opened in 1991 with the rest of the ‘new zoo’ this exhibit and its collection have remained mostly unchanged since its construction. The tigers have a view of the hoofstock over a moat. Additionally, Indian peafowl roam the zoo grounds.

- Fallow deer
- Axis deer
- Blackbuck
- Nilgai
- Sarus crane
- Swan goose

The exhibit formerly held Eld’s deer, banteng, demoiselle crane, mandarin duck, common shelduck, and teal. There are additional habitats for the Bengal tiger pair and Indian rhinoceros. The first baby rhino for the zoo was a male born October 1, 2007. The first Indian rhinoceros ever born by artificial insemination was born on June 5, 2013.

=== Africa ===
The African Realm is the largest exhibit complex in the zoo. The African Savanna Elephant habitat was opened in 2005 with the first three female elephants. It includes waterfalls, a large pool, a barn with a flexible design to allow for the separation of individuals, and several enrichment items scattered across the exhibit that change on a regular basis. The African ungulates and elephants are placed within a panoramic view, and from the cafe all appear to share the same space.

This exhibit displays:

- Bontebok
- Common ostrich
- Eastern bongo
- Egyptian goose
- Grant's zebra
- Greater kudu
- Grey crowned crane
- Marabou stork
- Pygmy hippopotamus
- White-backed vulture

Another yard adjacent to the hoofstock houses a family of Reticulated giraffes and Abyssinian ground hornbills. The giraffes can be seen up close and fed from the Overlook Cafe.

The Old World Aviary is also seen from the Overlook Cafe and is adjacent to the giraffe feeding post. It is home to a variety of African birds and a mammal species:

- Blue duiker
- Hammerkop
- Sacred ibis
- Guinea fowl
- Crowned hornbill
- African black duck

The African Realm is also home to the siamang (indigenous to Asia), Chimpanzee, lion, and cheetah.

=== South America ===
South America is the original and oldest section of the existing zoo. It utilizes what remains of the petting zoo that originally opened at the zoo's current location in 1972. The enclosures here are more antiquated, and this section is full of smaller, more traditional, and less modern exhibits.

- Jaguar
- Kori bustard
- Patagonian mara
- Blue and gold macaw
- Squirrel monkey
- Ring-Tailed Lemur
- Maned wolf
- Giant anteater
- Andean condor
- Chilean flamingo
- Crested screamer
- Capybara
- Ocelot
- Greater Rhea
- Spider Monkey

The zoo also has a Flight Cage that is made to resemble the 1904 World's Fair Aviary.

- Scarlet ibis
- Ringed teal
- Cattle egret
- Great egret
- Turkey vulture
- Snowy egret
- Wood stork
- Wood duck
- Yellow-bellied slider

The reptile house is in this section of the zoo. It has several specimens of reptiles and amphibians found throughout the world. None of the species are venomous.

- Pancake tortoise
- Emerald tree boa
- Dwarf caiman
- Reticulated python
- Solomon Islands skink
- Mossy frog
- Komodo dragon

=== North America ===
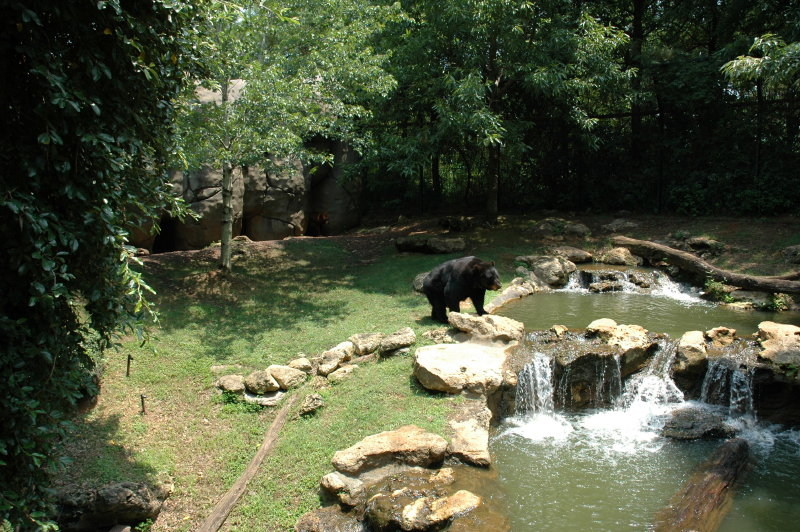
Bear habitat.

The North American exhibit is full of several species of hoofstock that can be found in Alabama and other parts of the United States.

- White-tailed deer
- Bison
- Wild turkey
- Elk
- Bighorn sheep
- Brown pelican
- Wood duck

There are separate enclosures for the cougar, Canadian lynx, black bear, bald eagle, river otter, and a pair of young American alligators.

== Mann Wildlife Learning Museum ==
In 2003, the Mann Wildlife Learning Museum was purchased by the Montgomery Area Zoological Society and moved to the Montgomery Zoo. The collection of large animals on display was taken with bow and arrow by trophy hunter George Mann. Guests visiting the Mann Wildlife Learning Museum are able to touch and feel the furs and antlers of some of the animals on display. The animals are in a three-sided display so visitors can walk up close and see the animal and their habitat. All the displays are assembled from natural material and actual plants, rocks, trees, dirt and sand collected from the actual site where the display animals lived. There is also a fish room, where many species of mounted fish are on display, including stingrays, sharks, marlin, blue fin and a killer whale.

== Other Attractions ==
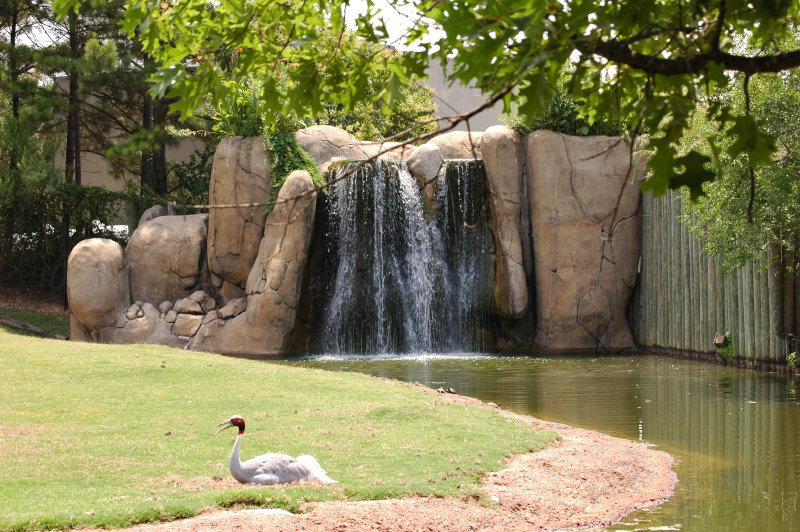
One of the waterfalls at the zoo

Feeding stations are located at the Asian koi fish pond. The zoo also has a Giraffe Encounter Post located at the giraffe exhibit in the African realm. Parakeet Cove is an interactive walk-through aviary and was built in 2012. The Zoofari Skylift Adventure Ride opened in 2014, and gives guests an aerial view of the park. The petting zoo features a collection of pygmy goats, ducks, and llamas and is located in the playground area near the Asian realm of the zoo. The keepers host daily lion and elephant talks and training sessions.

In 2011, the Montgomery Zoo began raising funds for the construction of a touch-and-feed stingray exhibit, where visitors would have a chance to directly interact with stingrays. The exhibit was officially opened on 6 March 2018. Shortly after, a life support system malfunction, that resulted in the loss of much of the marine life, caused for a complete overhaul of the life support systems and backup areas. The newly renovated exhibit opened in Fall 2021, Waters of the World, and features fish, invertebrates, and reptiles found in aquatic habitats all over the world.

The exhibit is adjacent to the Mann Wildlife Learning Museum, and near the Zoo's Chimpanzee exhibit.

== Future plans ==
Plans are currently being made for a butterfly pavilion to be constructed, in honor of those with breast cancer.

The Zoo is currently raising funds for the construction of a new reptile facility. In cooperation with the Madras Crocodile Bank Trust, the Montgomery Zoo has plans to house the endangered species of Indian Crocodile known as the Gharial, along with several other species in the new facility. 2019's Zoo Weekend, an annual fundraising event hosted by the Zoo since 1976, was solely dedicated to raising funds for this new exhibit. Currently, a large banner providing information of the new facility is hanging on the outside fence of the Greater rhea exhibit, located in the Zoo's South America realm. The new facility serves as a replacement for the Zoo's current Reptile House, which is also located in the South America realm.

== Gallery ==
Lions

Giraffes

Birds

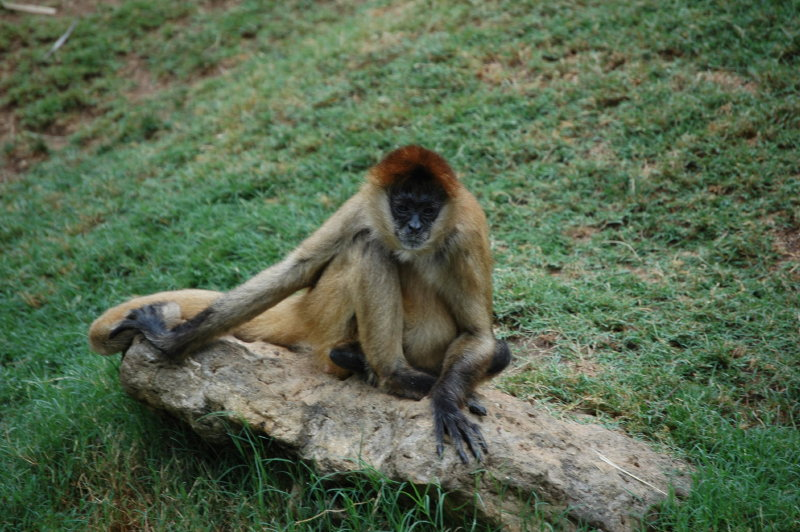
Geoffroy's spider monkey (Ateles geoffroyi)

Elephant

== Books ==
- Oak Park and Montgomery Zoo (ISBN 0738553115)
