= W. L. Mhoon =

American lawyer (1879–1950)

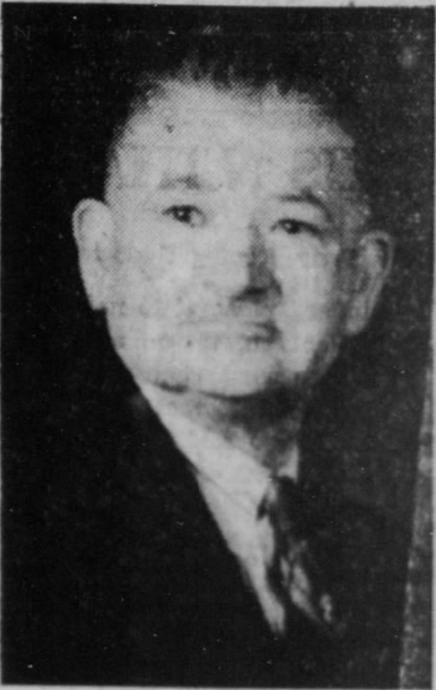
- Born: William L. Moon; 1879; Canton, Mississippi, U.S.
- Died: April 10, 1950; Jackson, Mississippi, U.S.
- Resting place: Elmwood Cemetery, Jackson, Mississippi
- Occupations: Lawyer, politician
- Years active: 1907–1950
- Known for: One of two African American lawyers in Mississippi in the mid-1940s
- Spouse: Annie E. Moman
- Children: 1 daughter

W. L. Mhoon, also known as William L. Mhoon (1879–1950), was an American lawyer and politician in Jackson, Mississippi. He was one of two African American lawyers licensed in the state of Mississippi in the mid-1940s. Mhoon was a black-and-tan member of the Mississippi Republican Party.

== Biography ==
Mhoon was born in 1879 in Canton, Mississippi. He began practicing law in Mississippi in 1907. Mhoon started his legal career at the Mhoon, Burns, and Levy firm. He also had partnered with Perry Wilbon Howard II, and had his own practice. Mhoon was described as humble and modest in his professional career.

By 1909, there were twenty-two Black lawyers in Mississippi. He reportedly appeared white, but did not try cases in court himself due to limitations imposed on the few black lawyers working in Mississippi. Many of the Black lawyers left the state in the 1930s after lawyer Sidney Dillon Redmond's legal issues and disbarment. In 1941, his office was at 119-1/2 North Farish Street in Jackson, Mississippi. By 1944, Mhoon was one of two African American lawyers in the state, the other being Taylor G. Ewing of Vicksburg, Mississippi. Mhoon also worked in the insurance business and in Black voter registration efforts in c. 1949.

He was a delegate from Mississippi to the 1924 Republican National Convention in Cleveland, Ohio. He was also a delegate at the 1928 Republican National Convention in Kansas City, Missouri.

Mhoon died of a stroke on April 10, 1950, and is buried at Elmwood Cemetery in Jackson.

== Personal life ==
He was married to Annie E. Moman, and had a daughter. He was Catholic. His wife filed a slander lawsuit in 1941 against Dr. A. H. McCoy after an article in Percy Greene's newspaper, The Jacksonville Advocate. After Mhoon's death in 1950, his widow Annie married Buddy Baldwin Dansby, the fourth president of Jackson State University.

== See also ==
- National Negro Bar Association
