= 1936 United States presidential election in South Carolina =

- November 3, 1936

Nominee	Franklin D. Roosevelt	Alf Landon
Party	Democratic	Republican
Home state	New York	Kansas
Running mate	John Nance Garner	Frank Knox
Electoral vote	8	0
Popular vote	113,791	1,646
Percentage	98.57%	1.43%
County results
Roosevelt
90–100%
President before election
Franklin D. Roosevelt
Democratic
Elected President
Franklin D. Roosevelt
Democratic

The 1936 United States presidential election in South Carolina was held on November 3, 1936. The state voters chose 8 electors to the Electoral College, who voted for president and vice president. With Roosevelt winning 98.57% of the vote, this was the widest margin of victory for any presidential candidate in a contested election for any state in American history.

South Carolina voted for Democratic Party candidate and incumbent President Franklin D. Roosevelt over Republican Party candidate incumbent Governor of Kansas Alf Landon. Roosevelt carried all counties with over 90% of the vote and all but one (historically Black Republican leaning Beaufort County) with over 95% of the vote, with two (Horry and Lancaster counties) being carried unanimously. His 98.57% of the popular vote is the highest for any presidential candidate in South Carolina since a popular vote was first used in 1868, or for any presidential candidate in any state with an opponent.

At the time of the 1936 election, the Democratic machine had been dominant in South Carolina politics for decades. The state's Republican organizations were marginal, serving mostly to distribute patronage when a Republican president made federal appointments within the state. The South Carolina Republican Party had been led by "Tieless" Joe Tolbert since the late 1890s. However, in the early 1930s, the state party split between two factions: a racially exclusive all-white group led by J.C. Hambright, and Tolbert's group, which included some African-Americans. At the 1932 Republican National Convention, Hambright was seated as the leader of South Carolina's delegation, but at the 1936 convention, Tolbert's authority was restored.

The schism between the two Republican factions extended to the 1936 presidential ballot. At that time, voters were presented with lists of electors nominated by each state party, rather than the names of the presidential and vice-presidential candidates themselves. As a result, two separate slates of Republican electors were nominated, one led by Hambright and the other by Tolbert's nephew Joseph A. Tolbert, and the state's already minuscule Republican vote was split between them. However, ballots in Allendale County, Colleton County, and Edgefield County counties listed only the Tolbert ticket as the slate of the Republican Party. The votes for Landon are presented here as a fusion of the two slates.

== Results ==
1936 United States presidential election in South Carolina
Party	Candidate	Running mate	Popular vote		Electoral vote	
Party	Candidate	Running mate	Count	%	Count	%
Democratic	Franklin Delano Roosevelt of New York	John Nance Garner of Texas	113,791	98.57%	8	100.00%
Republican	Alf Landon of Kansas	Frank Knox of Illinois	1,646 (Note: Landon total is a fusion of 953 "Tolbert" and 693 "Hambright" ticket votes.)	1.43%	0	0.00%
Total			115,437	100.00%	8	100.00%

=== Results by county ===
County	Franklin D. Roosevelt Democratic		Alf Landon Republican		Margin		Total
County	#	%	#	%	#	%	Total
Abbeville	1,265	98.21%	23	1.79%	1,242	96.42%	1,288
Aiken	3,298	98.95%	35	1.05%	3,263	97.90%	3,333
Allendale	1,236	99.76%	3	0.24%	1,233	99.52%	1,239
Anderson	4,025	99.36%	26	0.64%	3,999	98.72%	4,051
Bamberg	1,542	99.68%	5	0.32%	1,537	99.36%	1,547
Barnwell	2,157	99.91%	2	0.09%	2,155	99.82%	2,159
Beaufort	501	92.10%	43	7.90%	458	84.20%	544
Berkeley	690	98.85%	8	1.15%	682	97.70%	698
Calhoun	821	99.88%	1	0.12%	820	99.76%	822
Charleston	8,015	95.05%	417	4.95%	7,598	90.10%	8,432
Cherokee	2,280	99.00%	23	1.00%	2,257	98.00%	2,303
Chester	2,155	99.49%	11	0.51%	2,144	98.98%	2,166
Chesterfield	3,192	99.44%	18	0.56%	3,174	98.88%	3,210
Clarendon	1,260	98.67%	17	1.33%	1,243	97.34%	1,277
Colleton	1,463	99.46%	8	0.54%	1,455	98.92%	1,471
Darlington	1,995	99.40%	12	0.60%	1,983	98.80%	2,007
Dillon	1,104	99.55%	5	0.45%	1,099	99.10%	1,109
Dorchester	889	96.95%	28	3.05%	861	93.90%	917
Edgefield	1,304	99.92%	1	0.08%	1,303	99.84%	1,305
Fairfield	1,005	98.72%	13	1.28%	992	97.44%	1,018
Florence	4,194	99.41%	25	0.59%	4,169	98.82%	4,219
Georgetown	1,273	95.43%	61	4.57%	1,212	90.86%	1,334
Greenville	8,310	98.91%	92	1.09%	8,218	97.82%	8,402
Greenwood	3,064	99.38%	19	0.62%	3,045	98.76%	3,083
Hampton	1,253	99.37%	8	0.63%	1,245	98.74%	1,261
Horry	2,927	100.00%	0	0.00%	2,927	100.00%	2,927
Jasper	452	99.12%	4	0.88%	448	98.24%	456
Kershaw	1,400	98.59%	20	1.41%	1,380	97.18%	1,420
Lancaster	2,631	100.00%	0	0.00%	2,631	100.00%	2,631
Laurens	3,069	99.58%	13	0.42%	3,056	99.16%	3,082
Lee	1,045	99.52%	5	0.48%	1,040	99.04%	1,050
Lexington	2,138	98.53%	32	1.47%	2,106	97.06%	2,170
Marion	656	98.80%	8	1.20%	648	97.60%	664
Marlboro	1,219	99.59%	5	0.41%	1,214	99.18%	1,224
McCormick	988	99.30%	7	0.70%	981	98.60%	995
Newberry	2,615	99.66%	9	0.34%	2,606	99.32%	2,624
Oconee	2,057	97.49%	53	2.51%	2,004	94.98%	2,110
Orangeburg	2,947	98.04%	59	1.96%	2,888	96.08%	3,006
Pickens	2,678	98.17%	50	1.83%	2,628	96.34%	2,728
Richland	6,728	97.79%	152	2.21%	6,576	95.58%	6,880
Saluda	1,324	99.25%	10	0.75%	1,314	98.50%	1,334
Spartanburg	10,739	98.41%	173	1.59%	10,566	96.82%	10,912
Sumter	2,062	97.26%	58	2.74%	2,004	94.52%	2,120
Union	3,458	99.74%	9	0.26%	3,449	99.48%	3,467
Williamsburg	1,284	99.53%	6	0.47%	1,278	99.06%	1,290
York	3,083	97.81%	69	2.19%	3,014	95.62%	3,152
Totals	113,791	98.57%	1,646	1.43%	112,145	97.14%	115,437
