= Black-and-tan faction =

Faction of the Republican Party in the South from the 1870s to the 1960s

The black-and-tan faction was an American biracial faction in the Republican Party in the Southern United States from the 1870s to the 1960s. It replaced the Negro Republican Party faction's name after the 1890s.

Southern Republicans were divided into two factions: the lily-white faction, which was practically all-white, and the biracial black-and-tan faction. The former was strongest in heavily white counties. The final victory of its opponent, the lily-white faction, came in 1964. The disintegration of their influence in the Republican Party came about with the replacement of Old Right-oriented politics amidst the rise of the New Right under Eisenhower Republicanism.

== History ==
In the early years of the Reconstruction era, newly enfranchised Southern blacks in states including Mississippi enthusiastically threw overwhelming support to the Republican Party, which spearheaded the cause of ensuring their civil rights. They unified with a minority of racially tolerant Southern whites to form "black and tan" clubs. Within state GOPs, they clashed with scalawags, native-born Whiggish Southern whites who generally placed greater emphasis on business interests and economic expansion than safeguarding the newly secured rights of freedmen.

During Reconstruction, efforts by black-and-tan Republicans in favor of racial equality drew violence from Democratic white supremacists including the Ku Klux Klan, who resorted to violence against the early civil rights activists. Families of Southern Republicans, both black and white, were harassed by Democratic whites. The increasing decline of Southern Republicanism brought about by the rise of Jim Crow led many white Republicans to view abandoning civil rights advocacy as the only means of maintaining significant party influence in the region, contributing to the rise of the lily-white movement which would clash with black-and-tans for decades to come.

The black-and-tan faction was biracial. It sought to include most African-American voters within the party. They often took a prominent part in the national conventions of the Republican Party. One reason for the continuance of the black-and-tan faction was its effect in holding the African-American Republican vote in northern states. The black-and-tans predominated in counties with a large black population, the whites in these counties being usually Democrats. The lily-whites were mostly found in the counties where fewer blacks lived.

Factionalism in Southern GOP politics between the black-and-tans and the lily-whites flared up in 1928. Among the black-and-tans, Mississippi leader Perry Wilbon Howard II advocated a nomination of conservative isolationist Hamilton Fish III for vice president on the Republican ticket to maintain GOP popularity among black voters.

=== Eisenhower Republicanism and the demise of black-and-tans ===
During the 1952 United States presidential election where factionalism once again became an intense highlight, the black-and-tan Republican delegations in the Republican National Convention that year supported the nomination of conservative U.S. senator Robert A. Taft over Dwight Eisenhower. This included the Mississippi delegation led by Perry Wilbon Howard II. In contrast to Eisenhower, who testified in opposition to integrating the United States military in 1945, the strongly conservative Taft was devoted in his concern for blacks, continuously pushing civil rights measures in Congress.

B. Carroll Reece, a pro-civil rights Old Right congressman from East Tennessee, predicted adamant support for Taft from Southern GOP delegations. This proved true particularly for the states of Mississippi and Arkansas, whose delegations were led by Howard and Osro Cobb respectively.

The influence of Eisenhower Republicanism over the Republican Party resulted in a dissipation of black-and-tan influence in Southern GOP politics, particularly in 1956. The last state black-and-tan machine fell in 1960 with the displacement of Howard's Mississippi delegates by a lily-white slate at that year's Republican convention, while surviving factions lost heavily in 1964 with the nomination of Barry Goldwater for President and practically vanished.

== Notable figures ==
=== Arkansas ===
- Josiah H. Blount
- Joseph Robert Booker
- Powell Clayton
- Scipio Africanus Jones
- Harmon L. Remmel

=== Georgia ===
- Alfred Eliab Buck
- John Wesley Dobbs
- Henry Lincoln Johnson
- Judson Whitlocke Lyons
- Mamie George S. Williams

=== Louisiana ===
- Walter L. Cohen

=== Mississippi ===
- Mary Booze
- Minnie M. Cox
- James Hill
- Perry Wilbon Howard II
- W. L. Mhoon
- Sidney Dillon Redmond
- Roscoe Simmons

=== North Carolina ===
- Charles Norfleet Hunter
- Samuel Vick

=== South Carolina ===
- Joseph W. Tolbert

=== Tennessee ===
- Robert Reed Church
- Robert Church Jr.
- George Washington Lee
- J. B. Martin
- David Foote Rivers
- J. Will Taylor

=== Texas ===
- Norris Wright Cuney
- Edward Howland Robinson Green
- C. N. Love
- William Madison McDonald

=== Virginia ===
- Robert Russa Morton (later a Democrat)

== See also ==
- Civil rights movement (1865–1896)
- History of the United States Republican Party
