= Perry Wilbon Howard =

Perry Wilbon Howard may be:

- Perry Howard, nineteenth-century Mississippi politician
- Perry Wilbon Howard II, twentieth-century lawyer, son of Perry Howard
