= Harrison Truhart =

American Mississippi state legislator

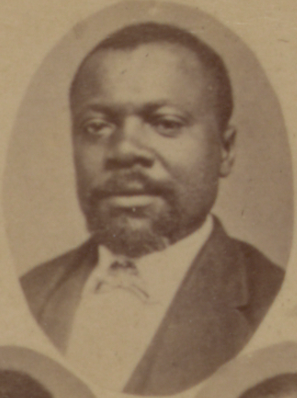
1874 official photograph

Harrison H. Truhart. (b. about 1840 Virginia - 1912) was a blacksmith and state legislator in Mississippi serving as a representative from 1872 to 1875. In 1872 he was elected to the Mississippi House of Representatives to represent Holmes County, Mississippi along with Perry Howard and F. Stewart. In 1874, again with Perry Howard and Tenant Weatherly replacing Stewart, he represented Holmes County in the House.

He was a Republican. He was one of the signatories of an 1872 petition to the U.S. congress calling for support for the Sumner amendment (Charles Sumner's proposed legislation that eventually became the 1875 Civil Rights Act) to end exclusion of African Americans from many enterprises.

He was brought to Mississippi in 1848 as a slave and had no formal education but learnt on own efforts. In 1869 he was appointed by General Ames to be Alderman of one of his towns wards.

In 1875 he was appointed as one of the trustees of Alcorn University.

In 1906 he gave a presentation called "Blacksmithing and How to Make it Pay" at the Mississippi Negro Business League in Jackson, Mississippi June 14, 1906.

He lived in Lexington, Mississippi with his wife Louisa and their children from 1870 until at least 1910, but likely until his death in 1912.

== See also ==
- African American officeholders from the end of the Civil War until before 1900
