= McCants =

McCants is a surname. Notable people with the surname include:

- Kevin McCants (born 1966), American Artist, Musician
- Allen McCants (1875–1953), American football player and coach
- April McCants-Baskin, American politician
- Darnerien McCants (born 1978), Canadian football player
- Ed McCants (born 1981), American basketball player
- Elliott Crayton McCants (1865–1953), American author
- Keith McCants (1968–2021), American football player
- Mark McCants (born 1958), American football player
- Matt McCants (born 1989), American football player
- Mel McCants (born 1967), American basketball player
- Rashad McCants (born 1984), American basketball player
- Rashanda McCants (born 1986), American women's basketball player
- Thomas McCants Stewart (1853–1923), American academic and lawyer
- Tom McCants (born 1962), American high jumper
- Will McCants (born 1975), American academic

== See also ==
- McCants Stewart (1877–1919), American lawyer
