= Josiah T. Settle =

American politician (1850–1915)

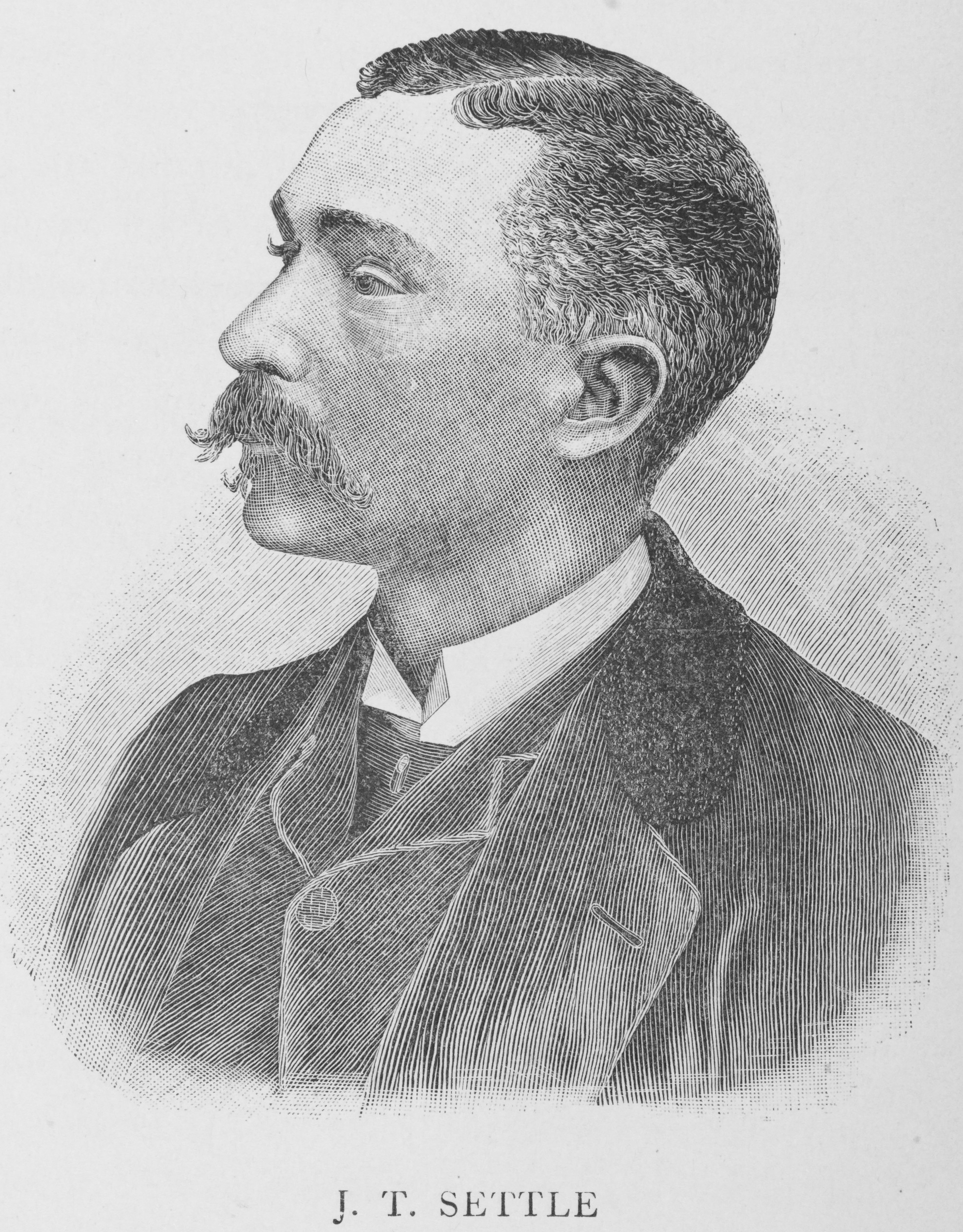
- Settle in 1887
- Born: September 30, 1850; Cumberland Mountains, North Carolina, or Tennessee
- Died: August 21, 1915 (aged 64); Memphis, Tennessee, United States
- Education: Howard University
- Occupations: Lawyer, politician
- Political party: Republican

Josiah "Joe" Thomas Settle (September 30, 1850 – August 21, 1915) was an American lawyer, active in Washington, D.C., Sardis, Mississippi, and Memphis, Tennessee. He was a part of Howard University's first graduating class in 1872. In 1875, he moved to Mississippi and was elected a member of the Mississippi House of Representatives in 1883. In 1885 he moved to Memphis where he was appointed Assistant Attorney-General in Shelby County. He held that position for two years before turning to private practice.

== Early life ==
Josiah "Joe" Thomas Settle was born a slave in the Cumberland Mountains of East Tennessee or North Carolina on September 30, 1850, to Nancy Settle. His father was the owner of the family, also named Josiah, and at the time of his birth, his master was moving the household from their former home in Rockingham, North Carolina, to Mississippi. His father was wealthy, having been a slave trader while that was possible. He was the son of David and Rhoda Settle. He had two daughters by his first wife, who died in 1829 in childbirth. Nancy Ann was a slave of Azariah Graves, a North Carolina militia general in the War of 1812, and may have been a child of his or someone in his family. Josiah Sr. and Nancy had ten children and Josiah Sr. kept a large number of slaves on his plantation in Tishomingo County. Josiah Sr. felt devoted to Settle's mother and children by her, and in the 1850s manumitted her and their children. As the state forbade the presence of free blacks, in March 1856, they moved to Hamilton, Ohio, although Settle kept his slaves and plantation in Mississippi and lived there in the fall, winter, and spring. In 1858 Josiah's parents married and in 1861, when the American Civil War began, the elder Josiah sold his land and slaves in Mississippi and moved to Ohio and supported the Union. He died in the spring of 1869.

== Education ==
Settle first attended schools near Hamilton, although he faced discrimination in school until the school received a new teacher. In spring of 1866, Settle started preparatory school in Oberlin, Ohio, and entered Oberlin College in 1868. At Oberlin, Settle participated in an integrated baseball club called the Resolutes which included African American Simpson Younger and a number of whites including Phil Dixon and Patrick J. Hannigan. The club played against a number of semipro and professional clubs and was very successful, its only losses coming to the Cleveland Forest Citys. The next year Settle entered the Sophomore class at Howard University. He graduated from Howard in 1872 in the schools first class along with James Monroe Gregory and Arthur Clough O'Hear; O'Hear died in 1876 in Charleston, SC. During his last two years at Howard, Settle clerked in the education division of the Freedmen's Bureau and in the last part of his senior year he became reading clerk of the Washington, District of Columbia House of Delegates under Alexander Shepherd. He also began teaching at the university before graduating, and after graduation joined the law department and was admitted to the District of Columbia bar. He also was active in District of Columbia politics, and served as a clerk in the Board of Public Works, as an accountant in the Board of Audits, and as a trustee of the county schools for the district. He also was active pioneer of the Hillsdale neighborhood.

== Career ==
=== Washington, District of Columbia and Mississippi ===
He supported Grant in the 1872 presidential election and campaigned in Maryland and in his home state of Ohio. He returned to Mississippi in March 1875 and was admitted to the bar in that state. His work at first brought him to various locations throughout the state, finally settling at Sardis in Panola County in northwest Mississippi, forming a partnership with D. T. J. Matthews. In the summer of that year he married Theresa T. Vogelsang from Annapolis, Maryland, in Washington, District of Columbia. Theresa was the only daughter of William and Charity Bishop who were prominent freedmen in Maryland. In August, he was nominated to the position of District Attourney of the Twelfth Judicial District in Mississippi, but the 1875 election in Mississippi was overwhelmingly won by Democrats and Settle lost. In 1876 and 1880 he was selected as a delegate to the Republican National Conventions. In 1876, he initially supported Roscoe Conkling and Stewart L. Woodford before turning to Hayes and Wheeler. In 1880 he supported Garfield and Arthur.

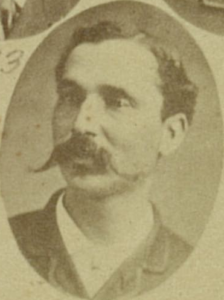
1884 photograph of Mississippi legislator Settle by E. von Seutter

In 1882, Settle was encouraged to run for congress, but endorsed James Ronald Chalmers who ran as an independent Democrat and was awarded the seat after some controversy. Settle was made chairman of the Republican Congressional Executive Committee and campaigned vigorously. In 1883, the Republicans and independent Democrats again sought a joint ticket for state legislature, which Settle opposed. Settle ran for a seat that year as an independent and was elected by a large majority. He was very successful as a speaker in the legislature, but decided to sit only one term. After adjournment, he decided to move to Memphis and focus on law.

=== Memphis ===
In the spring of 1885, shortly after moving to Memphis, he was appointed Assistant Attorney-General in Shelby County. He held this position until the end of Peter Turner's term as governor in January 1887. His firm was Humbert, Griggs, Settle, and Matthews.

From March 1886 to September 1887, Ida B. Wells boarded with Settle and his wife at their home on Lauderdale Street and Settle was one of a number of father figures for the budding journalist and activist. Wells and Theresa became close, but Wells moved out when she felt the wealthy Settles' were cheap and asking for too much money. Wells would later criticize Settle in her paper, Free Speech and called him a "sycophant" in her writings. This was in response to Settle and fellow black lawyer Thomas Cassels' representing members of Reverend Taylor Nightingale's church on charges that Nightingale's leadership was militant and incendiary "on the race question". Nightingale was convicted and fled Memphis rather than serve his sentence of 80 days in prison.

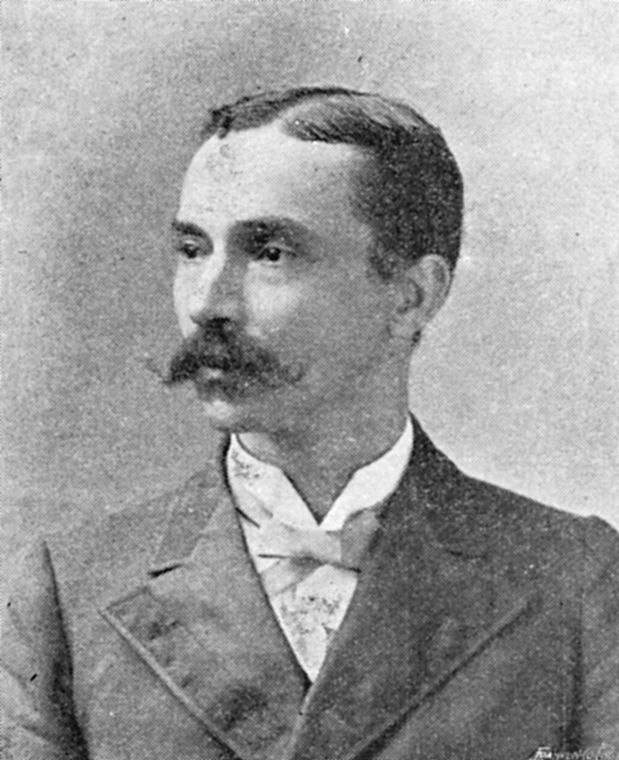
J. T. Settle in 1902

In private practice in 1905, Settle and Benjamin F. Booth represented Mary Morrison in a case challenging state law mandating segregation on street cars, although the judge ruled in favor of the state law. In 1900, Settle reported that "We have faced unreasoning prejudice. We have found, not our clients, but ourselves on trial, and not ourselves alone, but the whole race with us." In the early 1910s, Booker T. Washington wrote that Settle told Washington that as a lawyer he did not face discrimination from judges, lawyers, or juries.

In 1906 he, Robert Reed Church, M. L. Clay, and T. H. Hayes founded the Solvent Bank and Trust Company at 392 Beale Street in Memphis.

== Other activities ==
He was an Episcopalian, and in Memphis attended Emmanuel Episcopal Church. In 1910, he helped organize a Memphis chapter of Sigma Pi Phi along with James Carroll Napier of Nashville. In Memphis, he was a member of a circle of African American elites which included Robert Church, his daughter Mary Church Terrell and her husband Robert Heberton Terrell, Roscoe Conkling Bruce, Charles F. Hookses, and Samuel A. McElwee. Settle was the first president of the National Negro Bar Association (NNBA), serving from 1905 until 1913. The NNBA was affiliated with the National Negro Business League which had been organized by Booker T. Washington.

On March 20, 1890, Settle married Fannie McCullough, director of music at Lemoyne Normal Institute. About that time the Settles lived on South Orleans Street.

== Death and family ==
Settle died on August 21, 1915, in Memphis after a long illness. He had two sons, Josiah T. and Temoy. His sister, Cornelia A. married James Matthew Townsend in 1871.
