= Jacksonville Free Press =

US newspaper

- Type: Weekly newspaper
- Founder(s): Rita Carter Perry
- Founded: 1986; 39 years ago
- Headquarters: 1122 W. Edgewood Avenue
- City: Jacksonville, Florida
- Country: United States
- ISSN: 1081-3349
- OCLC number: 19095970
- Website: jacksonvillefreepress.com

The Jacksonville Free Press is a weekly newspaper serving the African-American community of Jacksonville, Florida. The newspaper was founded in 1986 by Rita Carter Perry, Florida's first female founding publisher.

== See also ==
- The Jacksonville Advocate
