= James Matthew Townsend =

African Methodist Episcopal minister

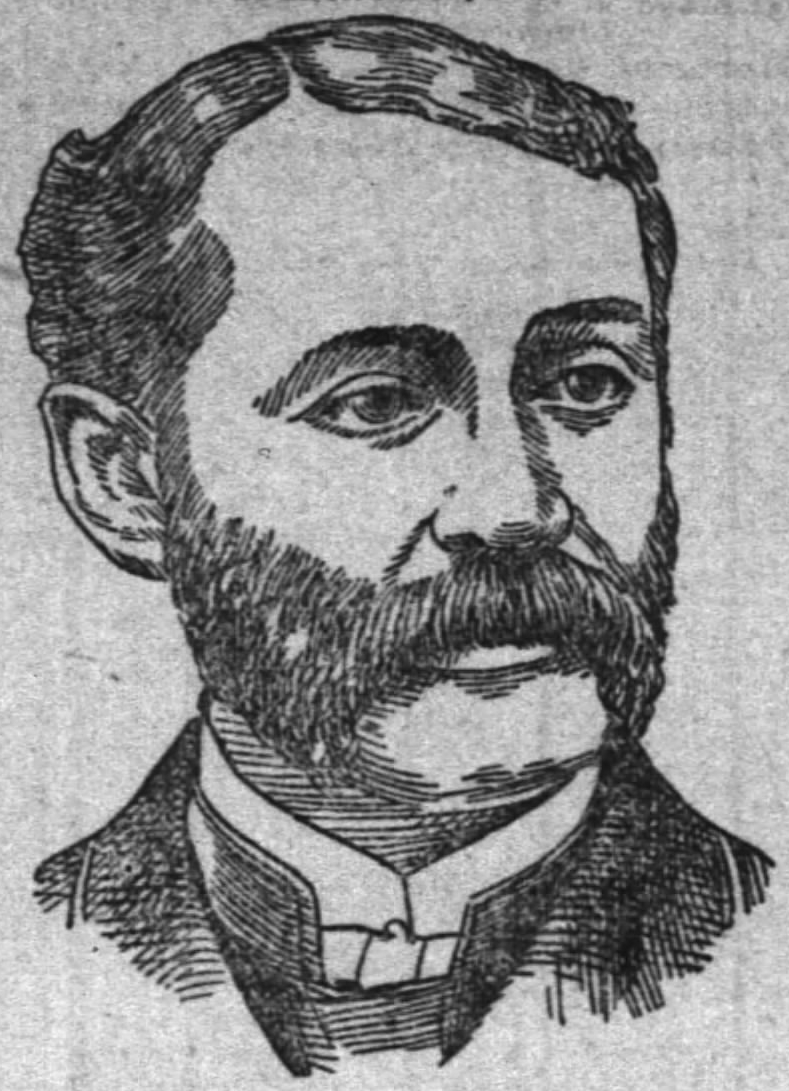
- Townsend in 1889
- Born: August 11, 1841; Gallipolis, Ohio
- Died: May 17, 1913 (aged 71); Richmond, Indiana
- Education: Oberlin College
- Occupations: Educator, politician, minister
- Political party: Republican

Religious life
- Religion: African Methodist Episcopal Church

James Matthew Townsend (August 18, 1841 – June 17, 1913) was an African Methodist Episcopal (AME) minister and a state legislator from Indiana. A Republican, he served in the legislature in the 1884 session. From 1889 to 1891 he was recorder at the General Land Office in Washington, D.C., appointed by President Benjamin Harrison.

== Early life ==
Townsend was born in Gallipolis, Ohio, on August 18, 1841, to William and Mary Ann Townsend. The family later moved to Oxford, Ohio, and Townsend attended local common schools. Townsend's parents were members of the AME church, and at the age of twelve he joined the church, led in Oxford by John Turner. At the age of sixteen, Townsend was licensed to exhort; and at eighteen, he was licensed to preach.

At the outset of the American Civil War (1861–1865), Townsend desired to join the Union Army, and in 1863 he joined the 54th Massachusetts Infantry Regiment, among the first African American regiments recruited.

== Career ==
Townsend mustered out of service at the end of the war in 1865 and returned to Ohio where he enrolled in Oberlin College. After two years, he left school to take care of his family when his father died. He was appointed to the position of principal of the colored schools of Evansville, Indiana, by the American Missionary Board of the AME church, during which time he continued his education. In 1871 he was ordained deacon by Bishop A. W. Wayman. Also in December 1871 he married Cornelia A. Settle, daughter of Josiah and Nancy Settle and sister of Josiah T. Settle. In June 1872, he was appointed pastor of a church in Richmond, Indiana, and in 1874 he was ordained elder. That same year he was appointed to a church in Terre Haute, Indiana. In 1876 he was made a member of the general conference and elected assistant secretary of the conference. From 1876 to 1878 he was appointed to Bethel station church in Indianapolis. He was also elected as corresponding secretary of the Parent Home and Foreign Missionary Society, a position he held for many years. He was also a delegate to the World Methodist Ecumenical Conference in London in 1881. In 1883 he was awarded a doctor of divinity from Wilberforce University. He was also a trustee of the college.

=== Politics ===
In 1884 he was elected to the Indiana House of Representatives where he worked for civil rights. He was an active Republican campaigner as well.

In 1889, Townsend was appointed to the position of recorder of the United States General Land Office in Washington, D.C., by President Benjamin Harrison. In 1891 he resigned and returned to Indiana. In 1893 he became pastor of Quinn Chapel in Chicago.

In the 1890s, Townsend was an outspoken opponent of lynching. In 1895, the St. Louis Post-Dispatch criticized him for, in the course of condemning the lynching of Neal Smith in Tennessee, suggesting "the torch must be applied in those cities where the outrages occur." The paper labeled him "a wicked counselor of his race."

=== Later career ===
In 1901 he took charge of Bethel AME church in Indianapolis.

== Family and death ==
Townsend married Cornelia A. Settle (1843–1923) in 1871. They had two daughters, one of whom was Grace E. (Townsend) Fowler (1889–1918).

Townsend died June 17, 1913, at his home in Richmond after several months' illness. He was survived by his wife and daughters. His funeral was at his home and he was buried in Richmond's Earlham cemetery.

== See also ==
- African American officeholders from the end of the Civil War until before 1900
- List of African-American officeholders (1900–1959)
