= Jeremiah Rankin =

American poet (1828–1904)

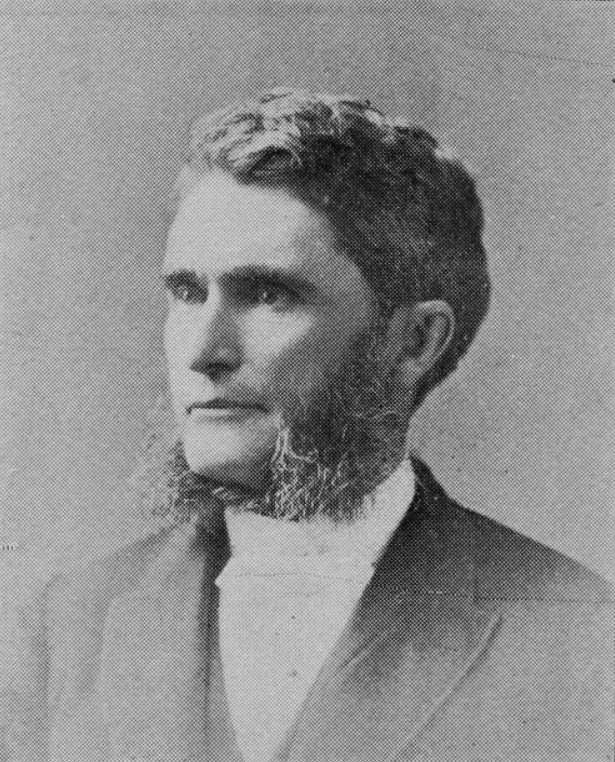
- Born: Jeremiah Eames Rankin; January 2, 1828; Thornton, New Hampshire
- Died: November 28, 1904 (aged 76); Cleveland, Ohio
- Education: Middlebury College
- Occupations: Clergyman, university president

Jeremiah Eames Rankin (January 2, 1828 – November 28, 1904) was an abolitionist, champion of the temperance movement, minister of Washington D.C.'s First Congregational Church, and correspondent with Frederick Douglass. In 1890 he was appointed sixth president of Howard University in Washington, D.C. Howard's Andrew Rankin Memorial Chapel was built during Jeremiah Rankin's tenure as president (1890–1903) and named after his brother. Rankin is best known as author of the hymns "God Be with You 'Til we Meet Again" and "Tell It to Jesus". In 1903 Rankin published a fictional journal of Esther Burr (Jonathan Edwards's daughter and mother of the third vice president of the United States, Aaron Burr).

Rankin was born in Thornton, New Hampshire, and graduated from Middlebury College in 1848. After completing his seminary studies at Andover Theological Seminary in 1854, he served as pastor of Presbyterian and Congregational churches in New York, Vermont, Lowell, Massachusetts, Charlestown, Massachusetts, Orange, New Jersey, and Washington, D.C. He was awarded a doctorate from Middlebury College in 1869. From 1870 on he was closely associated with Howard University, as trustee, professor of homiletics and pastoral theology, and president. He served twice as delegate to general conferences of the Methodist Episcopal Church, and once to the Congregational Union of England and Wales.

In 1869 Rankin became pastor of Washington's First Congregational Church. This appointment followed a split in the church over the issue of race. Those who remained with the church felt that he was prepared to lead the church in a properly unbiased direction. While pastor of the First Congregational Church (1869–84), Rankin's sermons were popular with Vice President Henry Wilson and numerous members of the United States Congress. Two sermons were published and circulated throughout the country ("The Bible, the Security of American Institutions" and "The Divinity of the Ballot"). Among Rankin's congregation were Frederick Douglass, John Mercer Langston, Blanche Kelso Bruce, James Monroe Gregory, and William T. Mitchell and their families.

He collaborated in the publishing of a number of hymnals, including with E. S. Lorenz's The Gospel Temperance Hymnal (1878) and John W. Bischoff's Gospel Bells (1880). Aside from his hymns, Rankin's best known poem is "The Babie", in the broguish style of Robert Burns, whom Rankin liked for their shared Scottish ancestry.

Rankin died in Cleveland, Ohio on November 28, 1904.
