= T. G. Ewing =

19th-century American lawyer and activist

Taylor G. Ewing Jr. was an African-American lawyer and civil rights advocate in Vicksburg, Mississippi. In the 1930s he was one of six Black lawyers in Mississippi along with Sidney Redmond Sr. in Jackson, and Ben A. Green in Mound Bayou. In 1944, he and W. L. Mhoon of Jackson were the only Black lawyers listed in Mississippi.

== Early life ==
He and his twin brother Prince Albert Ewing were born in Nashville, Tennessee. They were born enslaved. Taylor Ewing escaped slavery in 1861. He worked at Fort Negley, an American Civil War fort in Nashville. Prince Albert Ewing was one of Tennessee's first Black lawyers.

== Career ==
By 1910, he was secretary of the Union Savings Bank in Vicksburg. He was an alternate delegate for Mississippi at the 1912 Republican National Convention. He wrote a letter in 1926 about voter registrations and jury service of African Americans. He had a role in establishing an NAACP branch office in Vicksburg.

He eventually moved to Tennessee but continued to do work in Mississippi including winning a case for brakemen that was heard by the Mississippi Supreme Court. He and his brother had their law office on Fourth Avenue. in Nashville. His brother died in 1921 and he died in 1922.

He was photographed for the book, Sermons, Addresses and Reminiscences and Important Correspondence, With a Picture Gallery of Eminent Ministers and Scholars (1901). Nashville attorney David Ewing gave an interview about his family in 2007.

== See also ==
- List of first minority male lawyers and judges in Tennessee
- J. C. Napier
- Z. Alexander Looby
