= Ninety Six station =

- Southern Railway Depot
- U.S. National Register of Historic Places
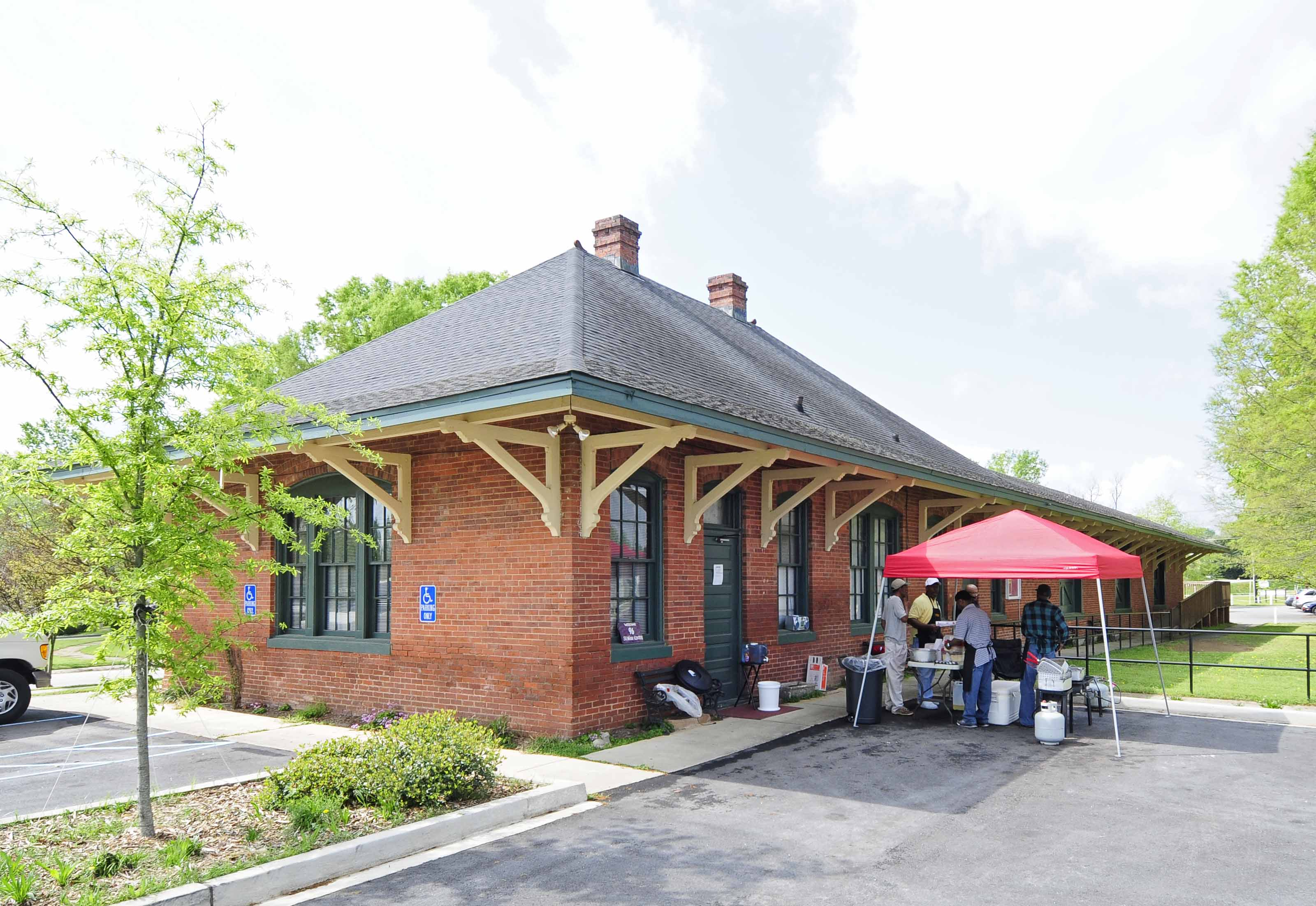
- Southern Railway Depot, March 2012

- Location within South Carolina Location within the United States
- Location: 99 South Carolina Highway 34, Ninety Six, South Carolina
- Coordinates: 34°10′29″N 82°1′27″W
- Area: Less than one acre
- Built: c. 1825, c. 1920
- NRHP reference No.: 11000731
- Added to NRHP: October 6, 2011

Southern Railway Depot, also known as Ninety Six Depot, is a historic train station located at Ninety Six, Greenwood County, South Carolina. It was built in 1915 by the Southern Railway, and is a combination passenger and freight depot. It is a one-story, rectangular brick building with a flared hipped roof, bay window, station master's room, and segregated waiting rooms.

It was listed on the National Register of Historic Places in 2011.
