= Ninety Six, South Carolina =

Historic town in South Carolina

Ninety Six 96
- Town
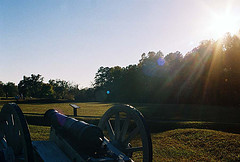
- Sunset over the battlefield at Star Fort

- Seal Logo
- Interactive map of Ninety Six
- Location in United States Ninety Six (South Carolina)
- Coordinates: 34°10′11″N 82°01′26″W
- Country: United States
- State: South Carolina
- County: Greenwood
- Established: May 27, 1905

Government
  - Type: Mayor-council government

Area
  - Total: 1.82 sq mi (4.72 km^{2})
  - Land: 1.82 sq mi (4.72 km^{2})
  - Water: 0 sq mi (0.00 km^{2})
- Elevation: 548 ft (167 m)

Population (2020)
  - Total: 2,076
  - Density: 1,139.1/sq mi (439.81/km^{2})
- Time zone: UTC−5 (Eastern (EST))
  - Summer (DST): UTC−4 (EDT)
- ZIP code: 29666
- Area codes: 864, 821
- FIPS code: 45-50290
- GNIS feature ID: 2406994
- Website: www.ninetysixsc.gov

Ninety Six is a town in Greenwood County, South Carolina, United States, about 9 miles (14 km) northeast of the county seat, Greenwood. As of the 2020 census, the town had a population of 2,096, making it the second-largest municipality in the county behind the City of Greenwood. The town covers a total area of 1.82 square miles, all of which is land.

== Geography ==
Ninety Six is in eastern Greenwood County. South Carolina Highway 34 passes through the town as its Main Street; it leads west 9 miles (14 km) to Greenwood, the county seat, and east 27 miles (43 km) to Newberry.

Lake Greenwood State Park is 5 miles (8 km) northeast of town, and Ninety Six National Historic Site is 2 miles (3 km) south of the center of town.

According to the United States Census Bureau, Ninety Six has a total area of 1.8 square miles (4.7 km^{2}), all land.

== Etymology ==
There is much confusion about the name, "Ninety Six", and the true origin may never be known. Speculation has ranged from the mistaken belief that traders estimated it was 96 miles (154 km) from here to the nearest Cherokee settlement of Keowee (it was about 78 miles [126 km]); to a counting of creeks crossing the main road leading from Lexington, South Carolina, to Ninety-Six (a legend proved false); to an interpretation of a Welsh expression, nant-sych, meaning "dry gulch". No one is able to confirm that European founder Robert Gouedy was Welsh, English, Scottish, or German.

Traders passed on information to each other about landmarks and distances along the Cherokee Path, and sometimes created maps. They estimated mileage between streams based on their day's travel. They noted unusual aspects, such as the six creeks that ran unexpectedly south away from the Saluda River and, further west, nine creeks that ran south away from the Savannah River, noting them on maps as "6" and "9". One story suggests that a town in this area and a district both became known as "Ninety-Six", likely related to the evolution of traders' references to 9 and 6, the landmark groups of streams. Using historical accounts and USGS maps, historians have traced the Cherokee Path across present-day Greenwood County – territory that at the time was part of other districts.

Another source suggests the numerical reference was to measuring by chain, a practice which is traditional in English parishes. Even so, the origin of the name "Ninety-Six" remains a mystery. Ninety Six has been noted for its unusual place name.

While the evidence is circumstantial, the place names of Six Mile, South Carolina, 18 mile creek, Three & Twenty Creek, and Six & Twenty Creek, all lead to the 96 miles from Keowee theory. This theory was taught as fact in SC history, in public schools in SC in the late 60s/early 70s.

== History ==
Established on the colonial frontier in the early 18th century, Ninety Six soon became a well-known trading post. It was the seat for the Ninety Six District upon its establishment as a town until the district's abolishment in 1799. The town was the site of a siege from May 22 to June 19, 1781 during the Revolutionary War, spanning 28 days. The battlefield is now the Ninety Six National Historic Site, maintained by the National Park Service.

Ninety Six was established on the frontier of the early 18th century, roughly around 1730. For a time it was known as "Jews Land" because some prominent Sephardic Jewish families of London bought extensive property there. The Salvador and DaCosta families bought 200,000 acres (810 km^{2}), intending to help poor Sephardic families relocate from London to the New World. They began to settle it.

The settlement became the capital city of the Ninety-Six District when the latter was established in July 1769.

On August 1, 1776, American militia forces led by Major Andrew Williamson were ambushed by Cherokee and Loyalists near here in the Battle of Twelve Mile Creek. More than 4,000 Cherokee warriors had waged war on a long front beginning in June, from modern Tennessee to central South Carolina. Francis Salvador, a Sephardic Jewish immigrant from London and a planter, was one of the casualties. He was the first Jew to be killed fighting with the Patriots in the Revolutionary War.

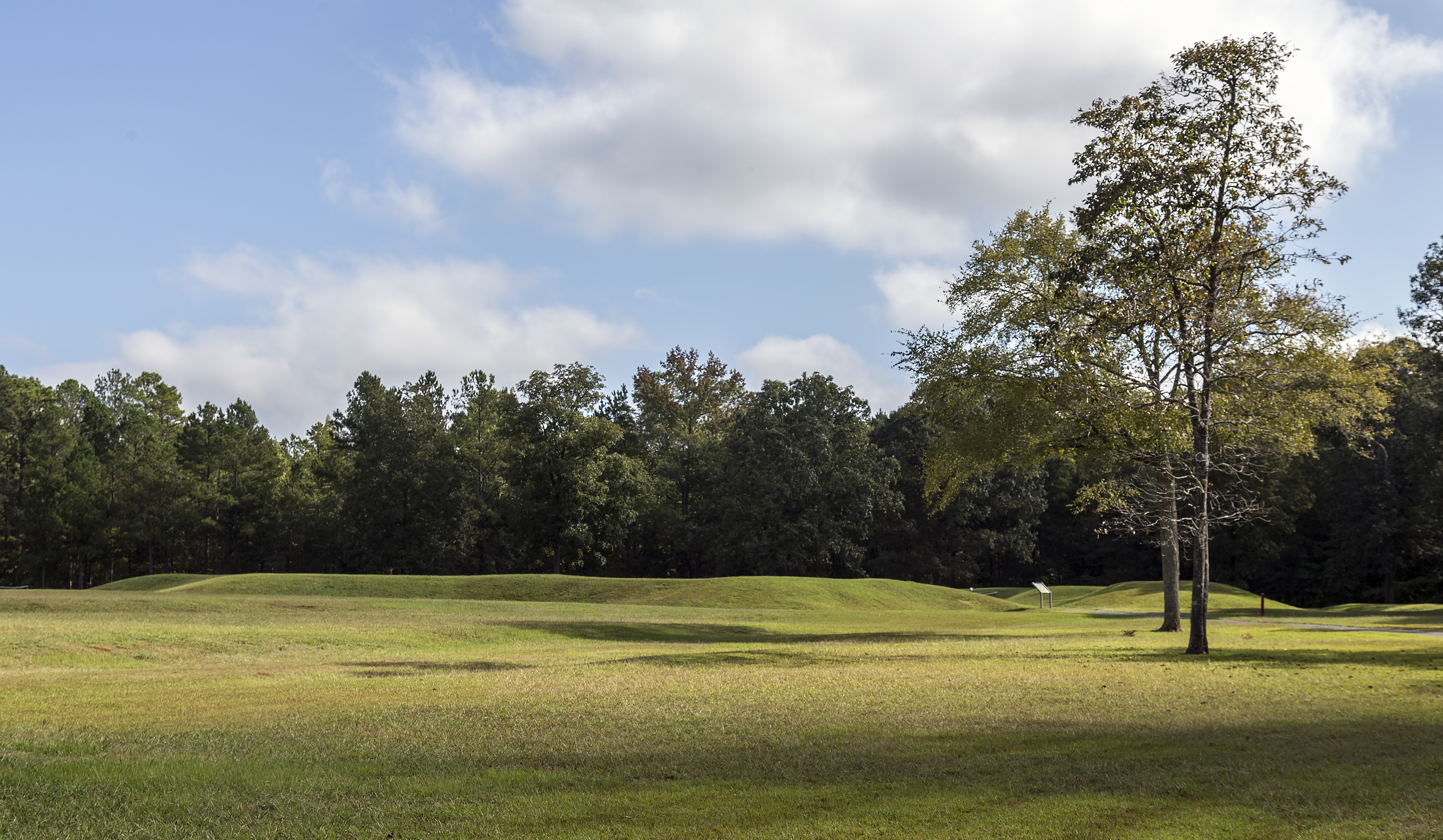
Star Fort battle site

The Cherokee were allied with the British in an effort to expel European-American settlers from their territory. In fall 1776, Virginia, North and South Carolina, and Georgia raised rebel militias to retaliate. Rutherford's Light Horse expedition had several units that attacked the Cherokee Lower Towns; the Middle, Valley, and Out Towns; and the Overhill Towns, dealing widespread destruction of Cherokee towns and their stores of food.

In 1780 the British fortified the strategically important frontier town with a star fort. From May 22 to June 18, 1781, Major General Nathanael Greene, with 1,000 Continental Army troops, besieged 550 American Loyalists who were defending Ninety Six. General Greene's chief engineer at the siege was Colonel Tadeusz Kościuszko, a Polish officer who became world-renowned for his role in the Revolution; he was wounded at the siege. The Loyalists survived the siege and relocated after the war to Rawdon, Nova Scotia, Canada, with support from the Crown for resettlement.

=== 19th century ===
In the 1840s, life for many farmers in Ninety Six began to move from mostly self-sufficient, smaller farms to a more commercial approach, by farming cotton, an extremely lucrative crop at the time. This transition was dependent on enslaved labor, causing a rise in plantations in the town.

During the Reconstruction era, the then Village of Ninety Six was chartered by South Carolina General Assembly on January 28, 1869.

Efforts were even made to create a "Ninety Six County", but largely failed due to Greenwood, the bigger railroad city. Greenwood then became the county seat of the newly formed Greenwood County in 1897, in which the town was included. Since the late 20th century, the National Park Service has operated the Ninety Six National Historic Site at the site of the original settlement and British fort. Ninety Six figured prominently in the Anglo-Cherokee War (1758–1761). During the American Revolutionary War, it was a site for southern campaigns. The first land battle of the revolution south of New England was fought here November 19–21, 1775.

During the 19th century, the town's economy was largely dependent on textile mills, such as the Ninety-Six Mill. However, as the mills started to shutter, and production began to be outsourced, the economy started to decline, which led to a revitalization project in the early 2000s. In the 21st century, Ninety Six benefits from tourism to its historic site and nearby state park, along with events such as the Festival of Stars, a Fourth of July celebration that is hosted yearly by the town.

=== 20th century ===
In the early to mid-20th century, the growth of the textile industry significantly impacted Greenwood and Ninety Six. As mills expanded, mill companies created mill villages to provide housing and amenities for workers and their families.

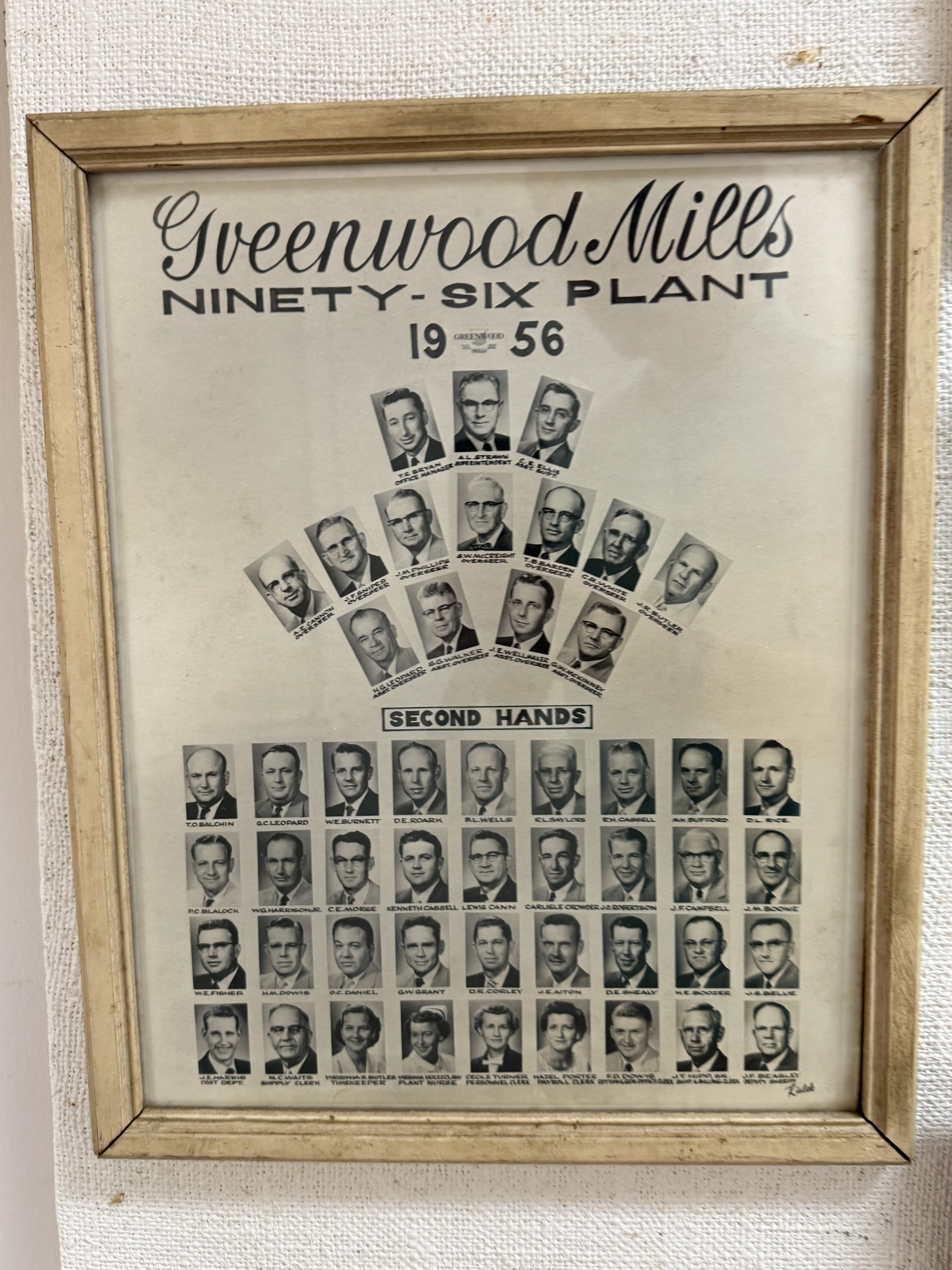
Mill workers in 1956

The Ninety Six Mill Village included churches, company stores, recreational facilities, and modest brick homes maintained by the mill. Residents often had wages to cover rent and goods purchased at the store, which then created a system where daily life revolved around the mill. The villages hosted social events, church activities, and local sports teams (such as mill-league baseball) Although the mills have since closed, many of the original homes remain, and the village is now known as the Historic Ninety Six Mill Village.

On May 27, 1905, the village incorporated as the Town of Ninety Six.

Segregated education for colored children was provided at the Ninety Six Colored School, which served both elementary and high school students until its closure in 1956 when students were transferred to the newly built Edgewood Middle School.

The Southern Railway was constructed through the town and had a stop at Ninety Six, the Ninety Six station. As well as the railway stop, the Kinard House, Moore-Kinard House, and Ninety Six National Historic Site, are listed on the National Register of Historic Places.

=== 21st century ===
In 2008, Ninety Six started hosting an annual Independence Day celebration, known as the Festival of Stars, and as of 2023 is still running in its 15th consecutive year.

==== Revitalization of Ninety Six ====
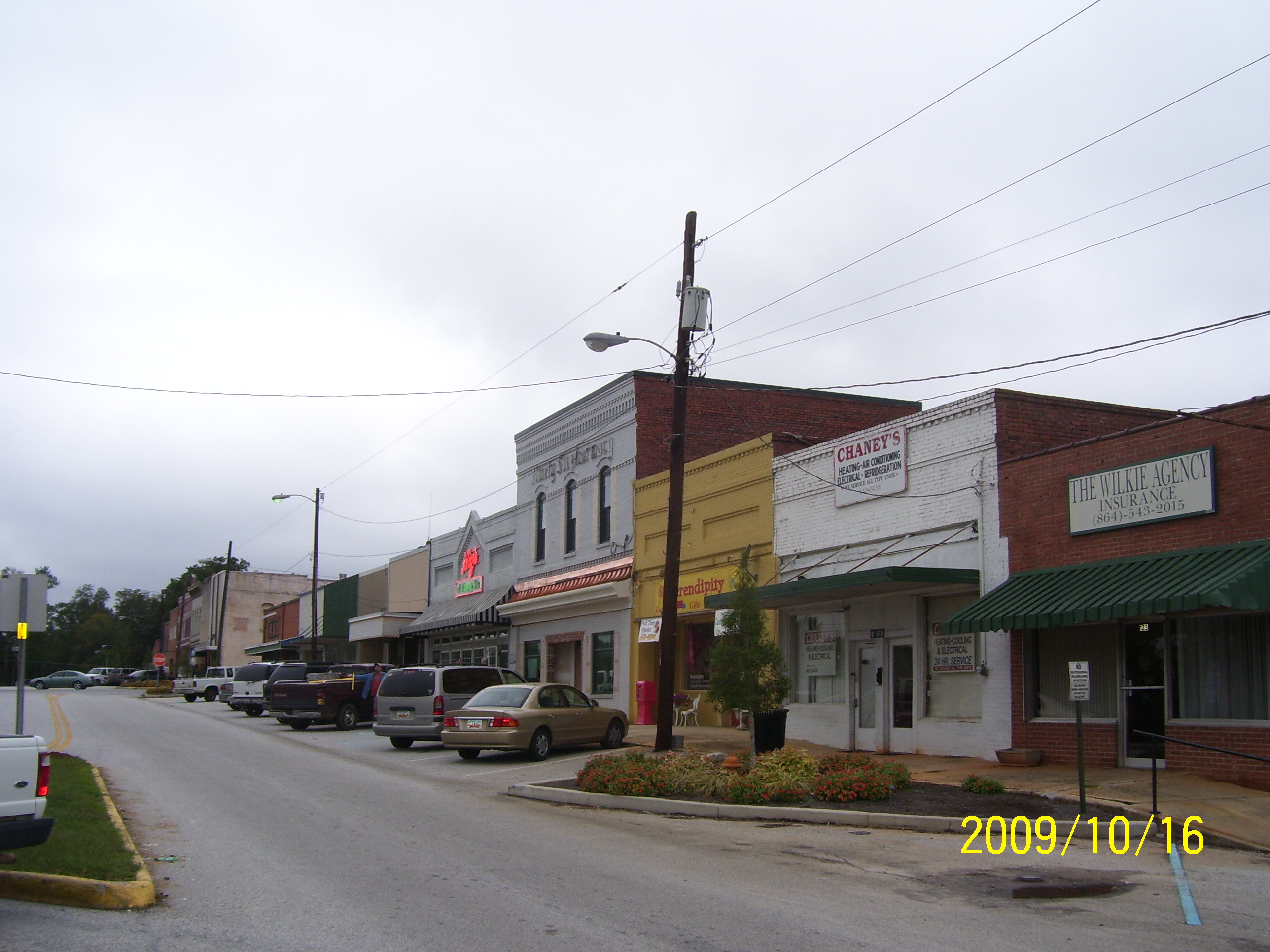
After the revitalization, many businesses were added to Lou Ellen Drive.

In 2007, the Town of Ninety Six, with the help of Clemson University, launched an initiative to address the economic decline and deterioration of the city, following the loss of textile jobs.

On July 10, 2007, community leaders, most members of the Historic 96 Development Association, held a public presentation outlining the plan for the project. The project's mission was to "restore pride, beauty and a sense of history to the Town of Ninety Six."

The initiative received broad support from locals, raising $28,533 of its $29,333 planning budget through pledges from the town, the Ninety Six Chamber of Commerce, Greenwood County, and local businesses. The project was also awarded a $29,325 grant from the South Carolina Budget and Control Board to fund streetscape improvements on Main and Cambridge Streets.

The planning of the project began with a multi-day "charrette" held in January 2008, where Clemson representatives had public input sessions with residents, businesses, government officials, and tourism leaders. Following the charrette, the town formed a committee and multiple task forces.

By 2012, the task force had:

- Installed benches, street lamps, signage, and planters downtown.
- Restored the Ninety Six Depot, which was later added to The National Register of Historic Places in 2011.
- Promoted downtown businesses by organizing events like the Festival of Stars.
- Enforced building codes, updated ordinances, and regulated public cleanliness.

==== Hurricane Helene impact ====
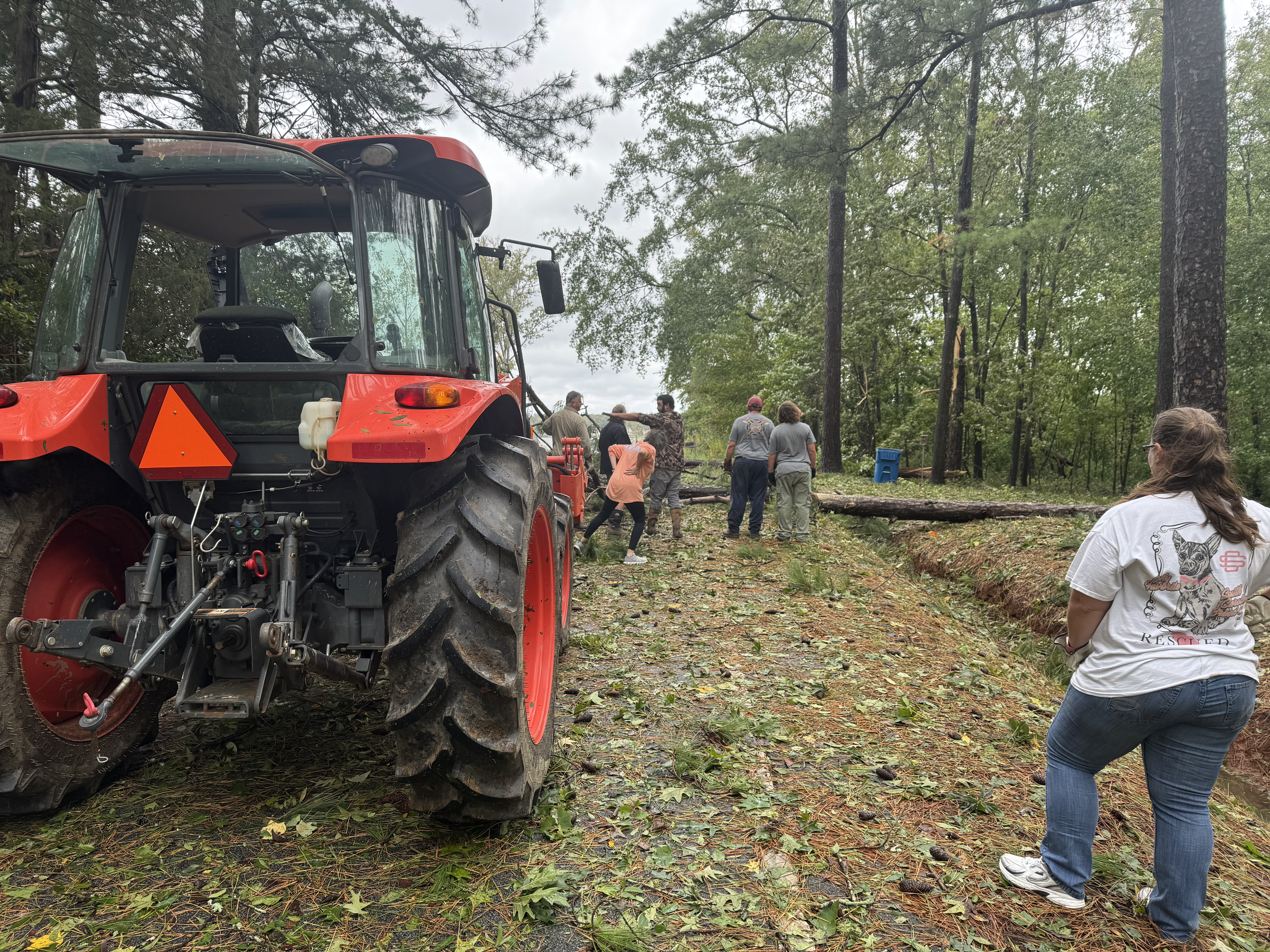
Ninety Six citizens working to remove trees after Helene

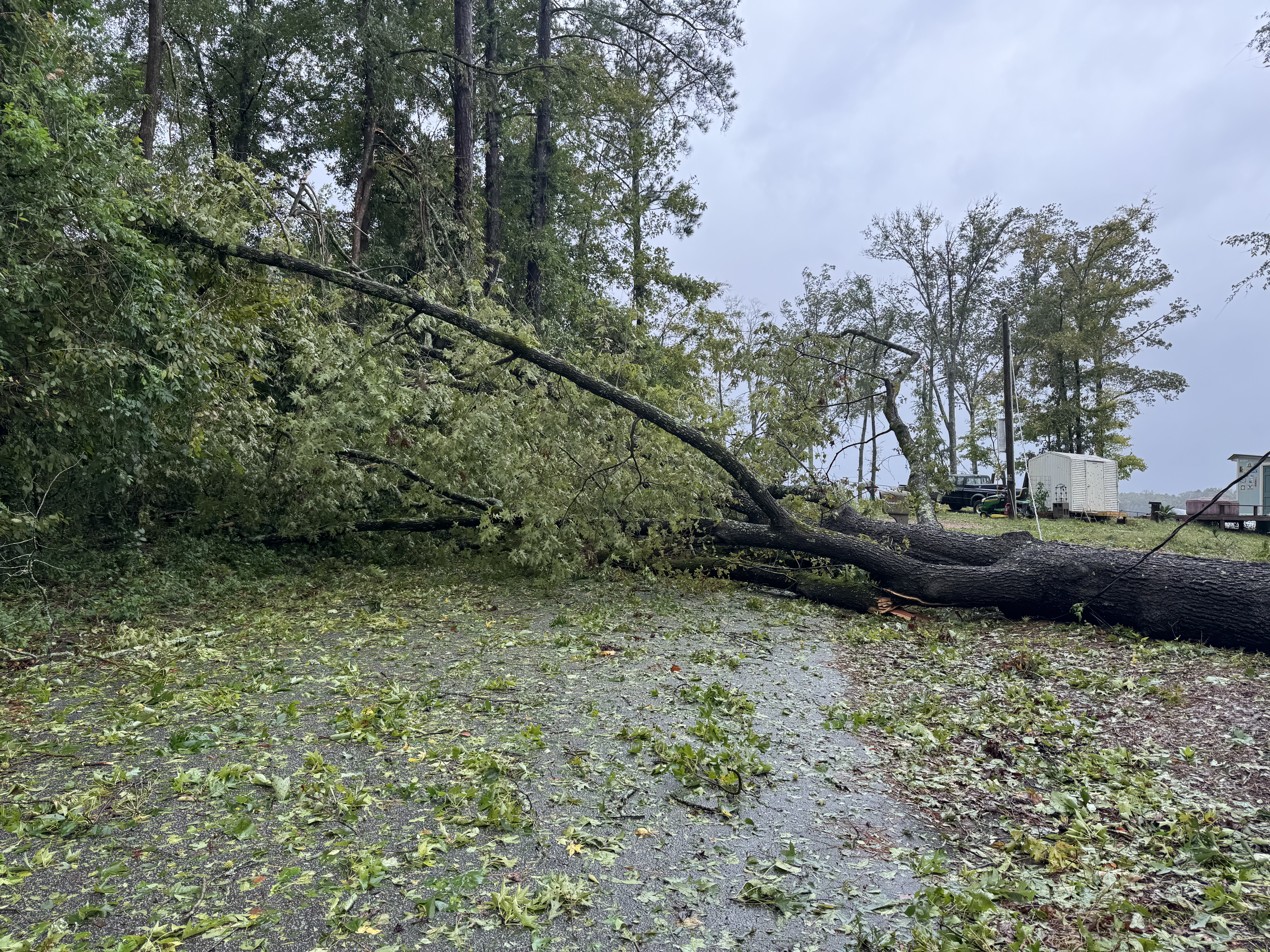
A completely blocked off road.

In the early morning of September 28, 2024, Hurricane Helene swept through the town of Ninety Six, taking trees and power lines with it, alongside damaging over 350 houses. Many citizens of the town, especially those in more remote areas were trapped in their communities due to the vast amount of trees that had fallen on roads. Many residents took it upon themselves to clear roads, using their own equipment and power tools to cut trees, allowing some to be able to leave their residences via automobile. However, as citizens drove around, many rushed to nearby gas stations to fuel their vehicles, causing havoc, with numerous fights breaking out. The National Guard was deployed to assist with the recovery efforts, and many troops were stationed at local gas stations. For the next week, Ninety Six residents were left without power, with many soely relying on backup generators, adding to the need for fuel. Citizens were eager to share what happened, with many needing to file insurance claims, but cellular signal was extremely weak, with downtown Ninety Six having little-to-no service. In Greenwood County, 23 cell towers were completely out of operation, with an additional 26 on back-up power and with limited range. A week after the disaster, as power began to be restored, residents were able to heat and cool their homes, but many were still left without internet service, leaving them unable to work. Nearly a month later, in early November, most residents had their internet service restored. The aftermath of Helene in the town is still visible as of 2025, with many trees lying on the side of roads, and homes with tarps on their roofs.

== Demographics ==
Historical population
Census	Pop.	Note	%±
1880	468		—
1890	445		−4.9%
1900	414		−7.0%
1910	758		83.1%
1920	773		2.0%
1930	1,381		78.7%
1940	1,453		5.2%
1950	1,556		7.1%
1960	1,435		−7.8%
1970	2,166		50.9%
1980	2,249		3.8%
1990	2,099		−6.7%
2000	1,936		−7.8%
2010	1,998		3.2%
2020	2,076		3.9%
U.S. Decennial Census

Ninety Six is the 187th largest city in the state of South Carolina, placing it in the middle of the state's city population rankings. As recorded in the 2020 census, Ninety Six had 2,076 residents, the highest count in town's history. Between 2010 and 2020, the town gained only 78 residents. In 2020, there were 706 households, and 520 families residing in the town.

=== 2020 census ===
Ninety Six racial composition
Race	Num.	Perc.
White (non-Hispanic)	1,518	73.12%
Black or African American (non-Hispanic)	434	20.91%
Native American	2	0.1%
Asian	1	0.05%
Pacific Islander	1	0.05%
Other/Mixed	74	3.56%
Hispanic or Latino	46	2.22%

=== 2000 census ===
As of the census of 2000, there were 1,936 people, 820 households, and 560 families residing in the city. The population density was 1,325.1 inhabitants per square mile (511.6/km^{2}). There were 904 housing units at an average density of 618.7 per square mile (238.9/km^{2}). The racial makeup of the town was 76.50% White, 22.73% Black, 0.15% Native American, 0.05% Asian, 0.21% from other races, and 0.36% from two or more races. Hispanic or Latino of any race were 0.52% of the population.

There were 820 households, out of which 30.1% had children under the age of 18 living with them, 47.1% were married couples living together, 17.6% had a female householder with no husband present, and 31.6% were non-families. 29.3% of all households were made up of individuals, and 16.0% had someone living alone who was 65 years of age or older. The average household size was 2.36 and the average family size was 2.90.

In the town, the age distribution of the population shows 24.9% under the age of 18, 7.4% from 18 to 24, 27.7% from 25 to 44, 22.9% from 45 to 64, and 17.1% who were 65 years of age or older. The median age was 38 years. For every 100 females, there were 81.1 males. For every 100 females age 18 and over, there were 78.0 males.

The median income for a household in the town was $33,423, and the median income for a family was $39,550. Males had a median income of $30,978 versus $25,034 for females. The per capita income for the town was $15,648. About 7.0% of families and 8.3% of the population were below the poverty line, including 8.6% of those under age 18 and 8.7% of those age 65 or over.

== Government ==
=== Local government ===
Ninety Six operates under a mayor-council government, which is a common practice for municipalities in South Carolina. Every odd year, the town votes on the first Tuesday after the first Monday in November with a nonpartisan ballot, meaning candidates' political affiliations are not listed on the ballot. The town is divided into six wards, each represented by an elected council member. The mayor, who is voted on by all wards, presides over the council and oversees the town's department's and services, which is run mostly by its 12 employees.

=== State level ===
At the state level, Ninety Six is represented by elected officials in both the South Carolina House of Representatives and the South Carolina Senate. In the House of Representatives, the town is in District 13, with its representative being John R. McCravy III (Republican).

In the Senate, the town is in District 10, and represented by Francie Kleckley (Democrat).

=== Federal level ===
Ninety Six is situated in South Carolina's 3rd congressional district, whose representative is Sheri Biggs which includes Abbeville, Anderson, Edgefield, Greenwood, McCormick, Oconee, Pickens and Saluda counties and most of Aiken and Laurens counties. Since 1994, Republicans have dominated this district.

The town strongly leans Republican, with Donald Trump winning 63.8% of the county in the 2024 United States presidential election.

== Culture ==
=== Festival of Stars ===
The Festival of Stars is an annual Fourth of July celebration held by the town each year. The event is typically scheduled in late July, with the 2025 festival scheduled to take place on July 25–28, and is centered in the town's downtown area, particularly on Main Street, as well as in the Ninety Six Town Park, with the carnival rides typically being across from the park. The event is organized by the Ninety Six Tourism Department with support from local volunteers, keeping the festival free to enter. It features a wide array of activities, including a live music show, carnival rides, a car show, food and craft vendors, as well as a highly anticipated professional firework display.

In 2024, the festival opened on July 26 with music from local singers, as well as Kile Antone. In the following days, the city hosted a Bike Night and carnival games from Midway Entertainment. On the last day, a car show was hosted, as well as 4 live performances from Becky Green, Ashley Stokes, Chris Turner, and Casey Chesnutt at the stage setup in the Town Park. The festival concluded on July 29, hosting a fireworks show at 9:45 pm.

=== Parks and Recreation ===
Ninety Six has one town park, located on Saluda Street, which is approximately 5 acres and features 2 playgrounds, with one being wheelchair accessible, as well as an outer running trail, which is a third of a mile.

==== Athletic fields ====
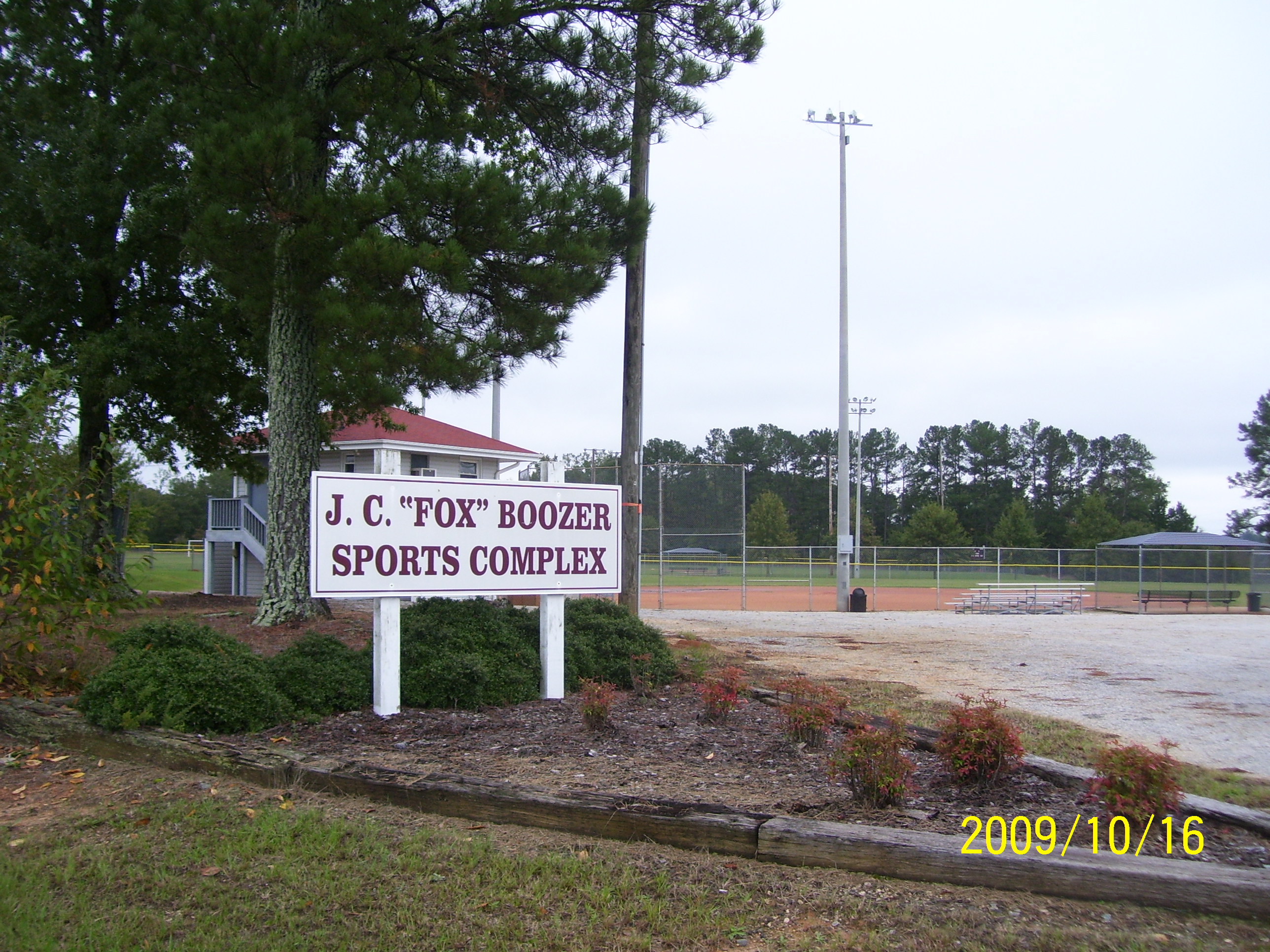
Sign for the Fox complex in 2009.

The town is home to the J.C. Boozer Fox Complex, which had its first game in 1976, and houses 4 multipurpose baseball fields that recreational teams in the area use. The complex was recently reopened in 2023 after a renovation – which was mostly funded using funds from the Greenwood County Capital Project Sales Tax added an additional baseball field, new lighting, and made the walkways ADA-compliant.

Ninety Six also houses Greenwood School District 52's athletic fields, including Ninety Six High School's baseball and softball fields, as well as Wilson-Campbell Stadium, and other fields at the Athletic Multiplex.

==== Ninety Six Trail ====
Ninety Six Town Trail Map

For approximately 1.3 miles on the 96th Hwy, from First Street to Duke Street, the Ninety Six Trail runs through the town. In the early 1900s, the path of the trail was a Southern Railway train route. The trail is mostly unpaved, except a small section of trail near the visitor center and Ninety Six station where the city has paved it, since many people walk that area during the Festival of Stars and Christmas parade. The trail passes Revolutionary and Colonial era historical points, and is marked with signage, as well as lined with rocks at some points, with benches at a few markers.

== Infrastructure ==
=== Transportation ===
==== Train/rail transit ====
Ninety Six is home to a retired Southern Railway train station, known as the Ninety Six station, which was built in 1915 to serve passenger and cargo fleets. The depot was later added to the National Register of Historic Places due to its architectural significance. It still used today, but serves as a multipurpose building, occasionally hosting Lion's Club meetings.

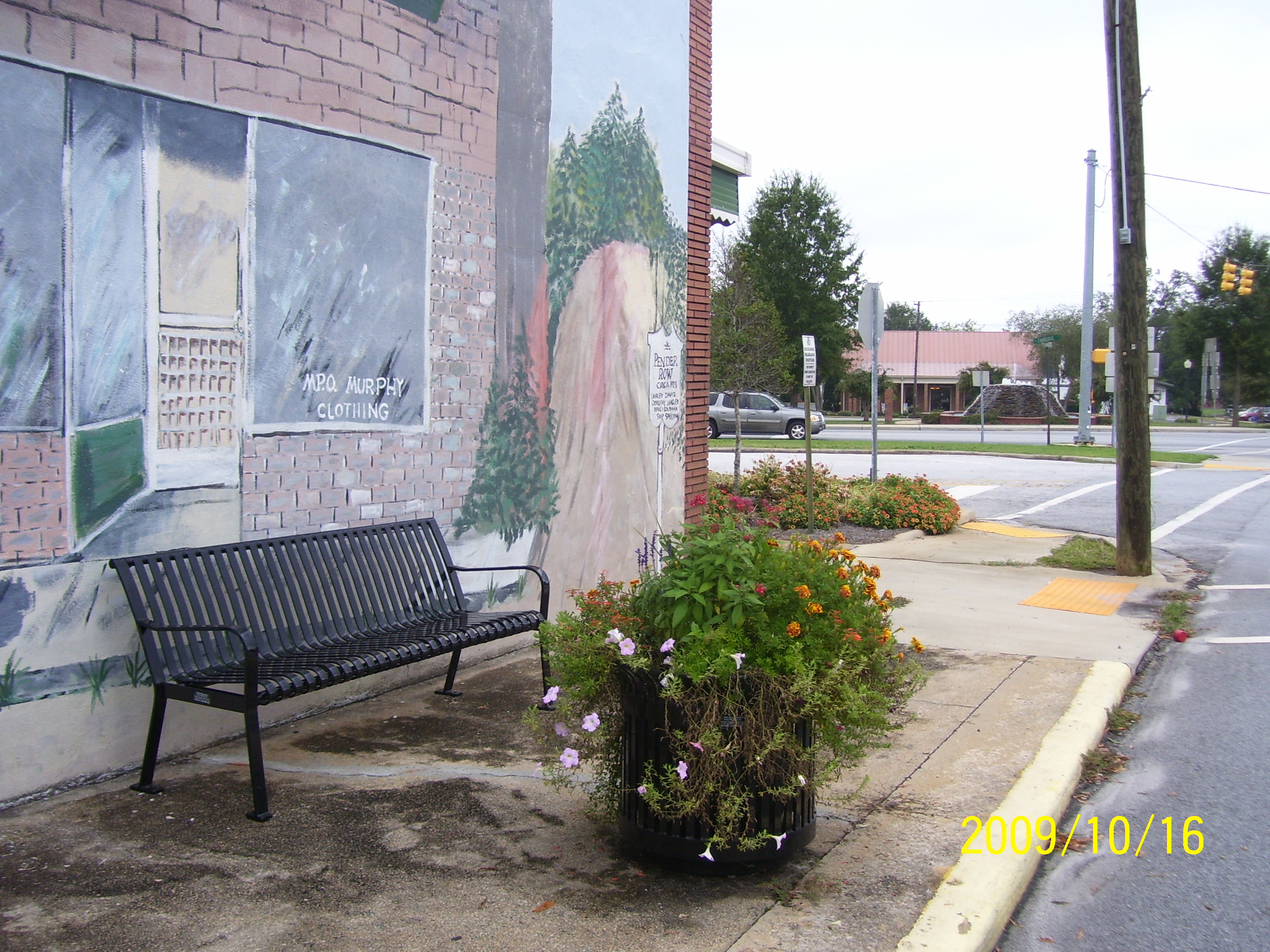
Street mural beside a sidewalk and road.

==== Roads ====
Ninety Six is served by a network of state highways that run through the town, for example SC-34, which runs from west to east through the town's downtown. Highway 246, also runs vertically through the city, connecting over 2600 vehicles a day to US-221 and Highway 72, which connects to the other side of Lake Greenwood. The town is approximately 35 miles away from the nearest interstate, I-26, which is accessible through SC Highway 34 through Newberry.

The South Carolina Department of Transportation has made plans to improve the SC 246 corridor from US 221 to SC 702 by widening lanes from 2 to 5 for a mile, as well as replacing and widening the bridge along SC 246. The project is ongoing as of 2025.

=== Utilities ===
Electric power for Ninety Six residents is provided by Duke Energy or the Greenwood CPW for some areas. Natural gas service is provided solely by the Greenwood Commissioners of Public Works. Water and sewer service are provided by The Ninety Six Commission of Public Works. Internet service is provided by Brightspeed (formally Centurylink), Spectrum, Vyve Broadband, and West Carolina.

=== Healthcare ===
Ninety Six's nearest hospital is Self Regional Memorial Hospital, which is inside the Self Regional Healthcare system.

Ninety Six Family Dentistry is located on North Cambridge Street, and is independent from any healthcare system.

== Education ==
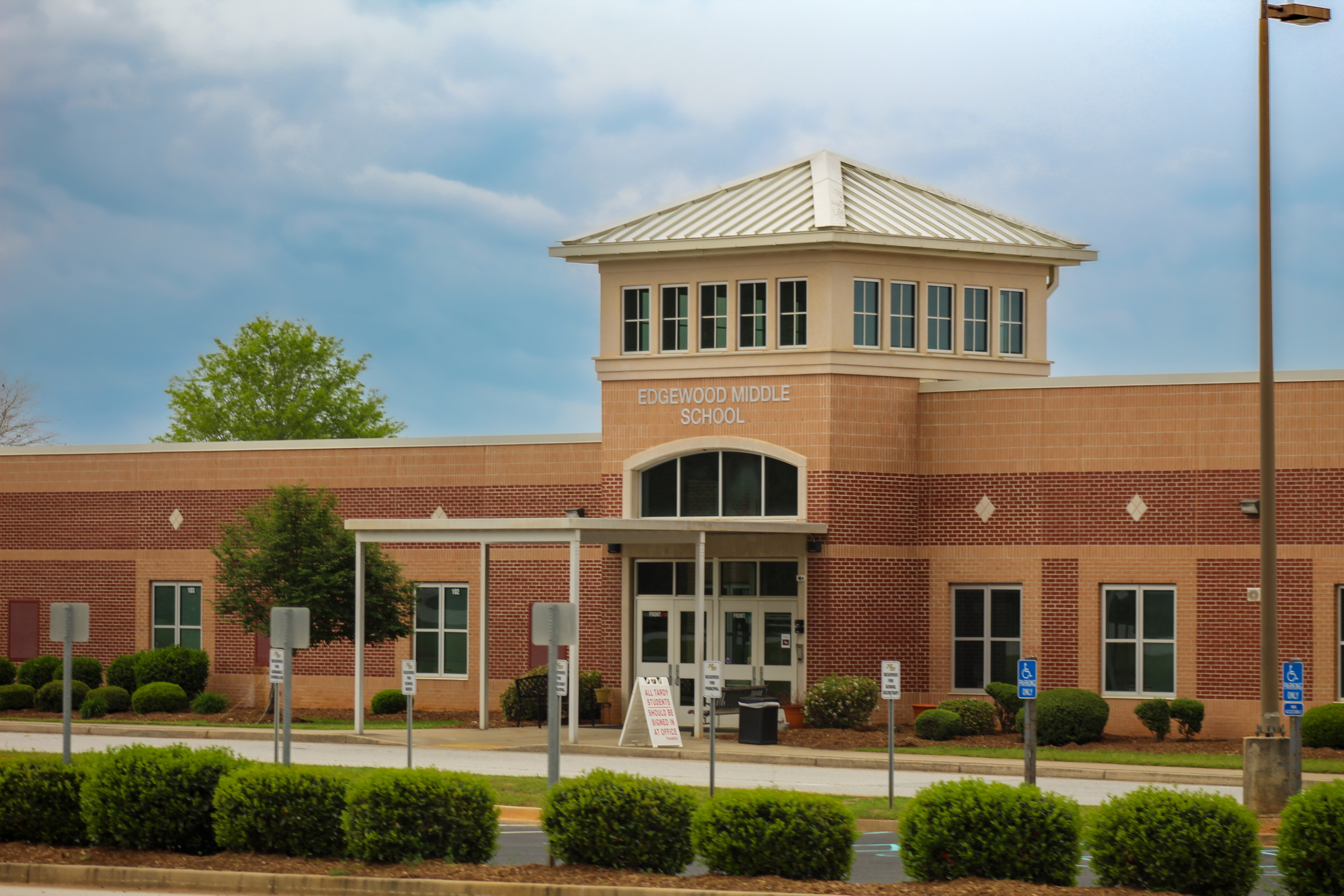
Edgewood Middle School

The town is inside Greenwood School District 52, which serves 1,359 students across 4 schools inside the town, under Superintendent Beth Taylor. The district has one high school, one middle school, one elementary school, and one primary school, with grades K4–12th.

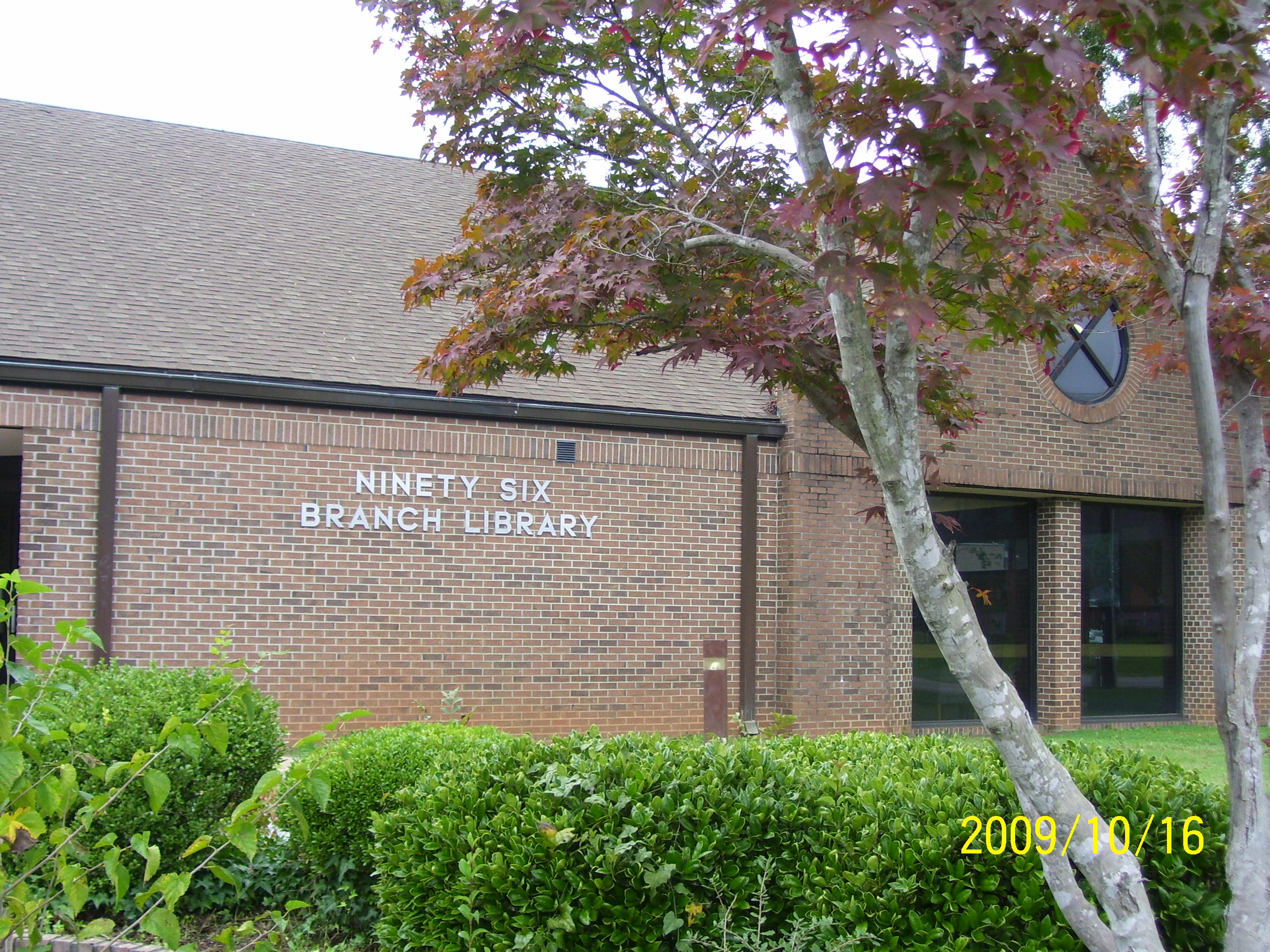
The branch library

Ninety Six has a public library, a branch of the Greenwood County Library System.

== Notable people ==
- Orville Vernon Burton, professor of history at Clemson University, was raised in Ninety Six. His book, In My Father's House Are Many Mansions: Family and Community in Edgefield, South Carolina traces the social history of that region.
- Cal Drummond, Major League Baseball umpire born in Ninety Six
- John W. Drummond, South Carolina businessman and legislator
- Benjamin Mays, sixth president of Morehouse College and mentor to Morehouse student Martin Luther King Jr.; born in the vicinity of Ninety Six
- Elliott Crayton McCants (1865–1953), author and educator
- Odean Pope (1938–present), jazz tenor saxophonist, born in Ninety Six but grew up in Philadelphia
- Francis Salvador (1747–1776), bought land in Ninety-Six District, and was the first Jew to be elected to public office in the colonies (1774, to SC's Provincial Congress); after joining the militia, in 1776 he was the first Jew killed in the American Revolution in a battle with Loyalists and Cherokee
- Joseph W. Tolbert (1865–1946), South Carolina Republican Party leader and committeeman
- Bill Voiselle, pitcher for the New York Giants, Boston Braves, and Chicago Cubs, wore his hometown as uniform number "96" when playing with Boston and Chicago. Along with Vern Bickford, Voiselle was a part of the Braves 1948 pitching rotation, of which Braves fans bragged that the pitching staff comprised "(Warren) Spahn and (Johnny) Sain and Pray for Rain."

== Representation in popular culture ==
The 1781 siege was described in William Gilmore Simms' novel, The Forayers (1855). It is also featured in Kenneth Roberts' novel, Oliver Wiswell (1940), which includes a chapter entitled "Ninety-Six".

== See also ==
- List of places with numeric names
