= Moore-Kinard House =

Historic house in South Carolina, United States

- U.S. National Register of Historic Places
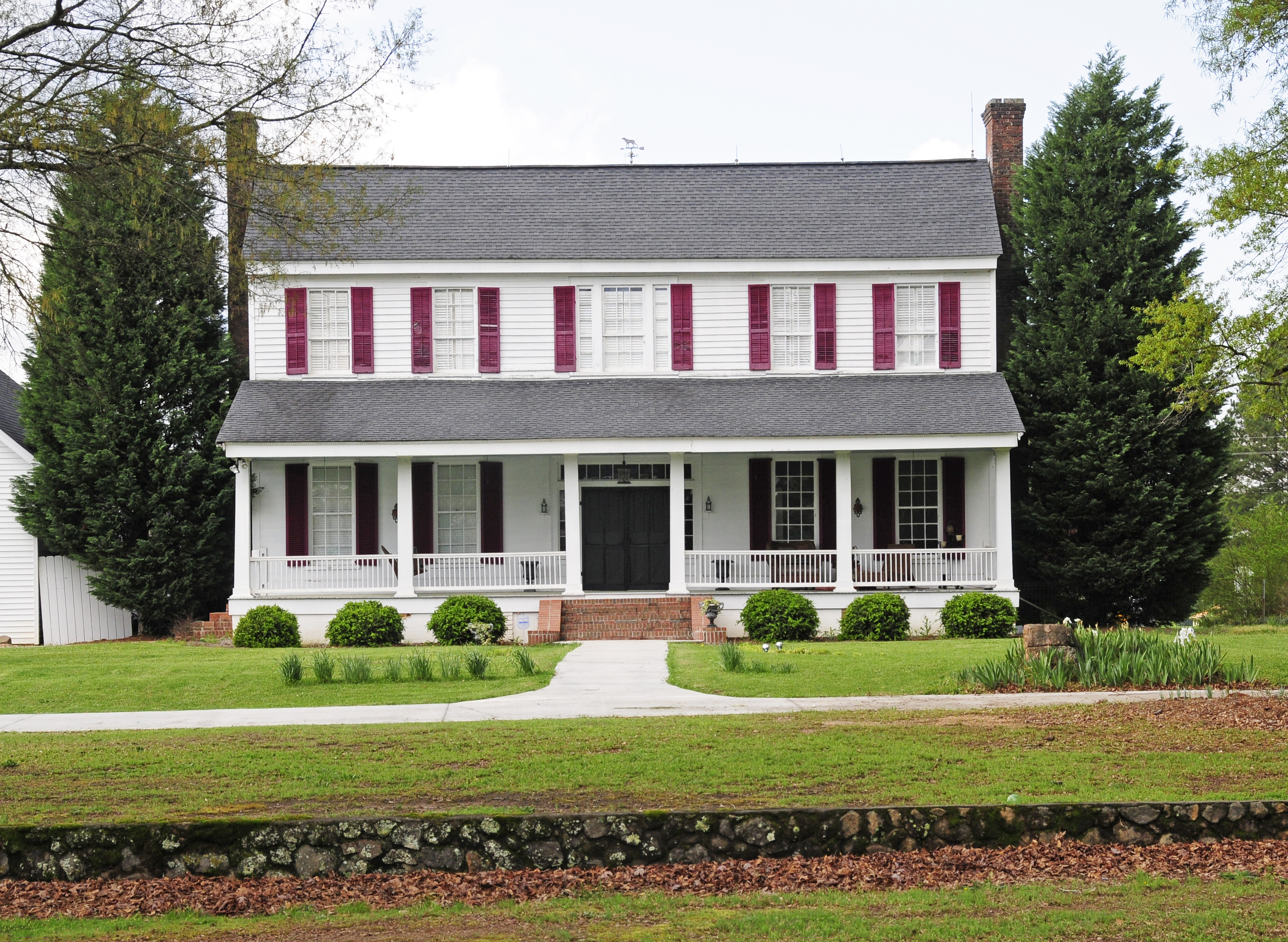
- Moore-Kinard House, March 2012

- Location within South Carolina Location within the United States
- Location: U.S. Route 178 and S-24-44, near Ninety Six, South Carolina
- Coordinates: 34°5′18″N 82°2′34″W
- Area: 2.4 acres (0.97 ha)
- Built: c. 1835
- NRHP reference No.: 83002198
- Added to NRHP: August 4, 1983

Moore-Kinard House, also known as the J.M.C. Kinard House, is a historic home located near Ninety Six, Greenwood County, South Carolina. It was built about 1835, and is a two-story, frame, antebellum central-hall farmhouse, or I-house. Additions were made to the rear and one side of the house about 1900. Also on the property are the following contributing late-19th or early-20th century outbuildings: a smokehouse, cotton house, tool shed, ironing house, and well.

It was listed on the National Register of Historic Places in 1983.
