= Prince Albert Ewing =

One of the first Tennessee black lawyers

- Born: 1849
- Died: 1921 (aged 71–72)
- Occupation: Lawyer
- Known for: Being one of the first African-American lawyer of Tennessee

Prince Albert Ervin Ewing (1849–1921) was one of Tennessee's first Black lawyers, a pioneering African American attorney and civil rights advocate in Tennessee. Born into slavery, Ewing became one of the first Black lawyers in the state during a time of extreme racial segregation. His twin brother, Taylor G. Ewing, was also an influential civil rights lawyer.

== Life ==
Prince Albert Ewing was born 28 Feb 1849 in Davidson County, Tennessee. His mother was Margaret (Ewing) Thompson. According to descendants, he was born enslaved at the Travellers Rest plantation in Nashville which was owned by John W Overton's family. Ewing studied law under the influential lawyer/politician Edward Baxter. Born into slavery, Ewing had eventually become a Fisk graduate. Many local historians believe that when he obtained a “regular” attorney's license on September 15, 1871, he was likely the first African American to do so. Prince married Isabella Watson in 1872.

== Career ==
Ewing and his brother played a crucial role in advocating for African American rights, including efforts to challenge discriminatory laws and practices. Their law office in Nashville became a focal point for African American legal action.
