= James Monroe Gregory =

American academic and civil rights campaigner (1849–1915)

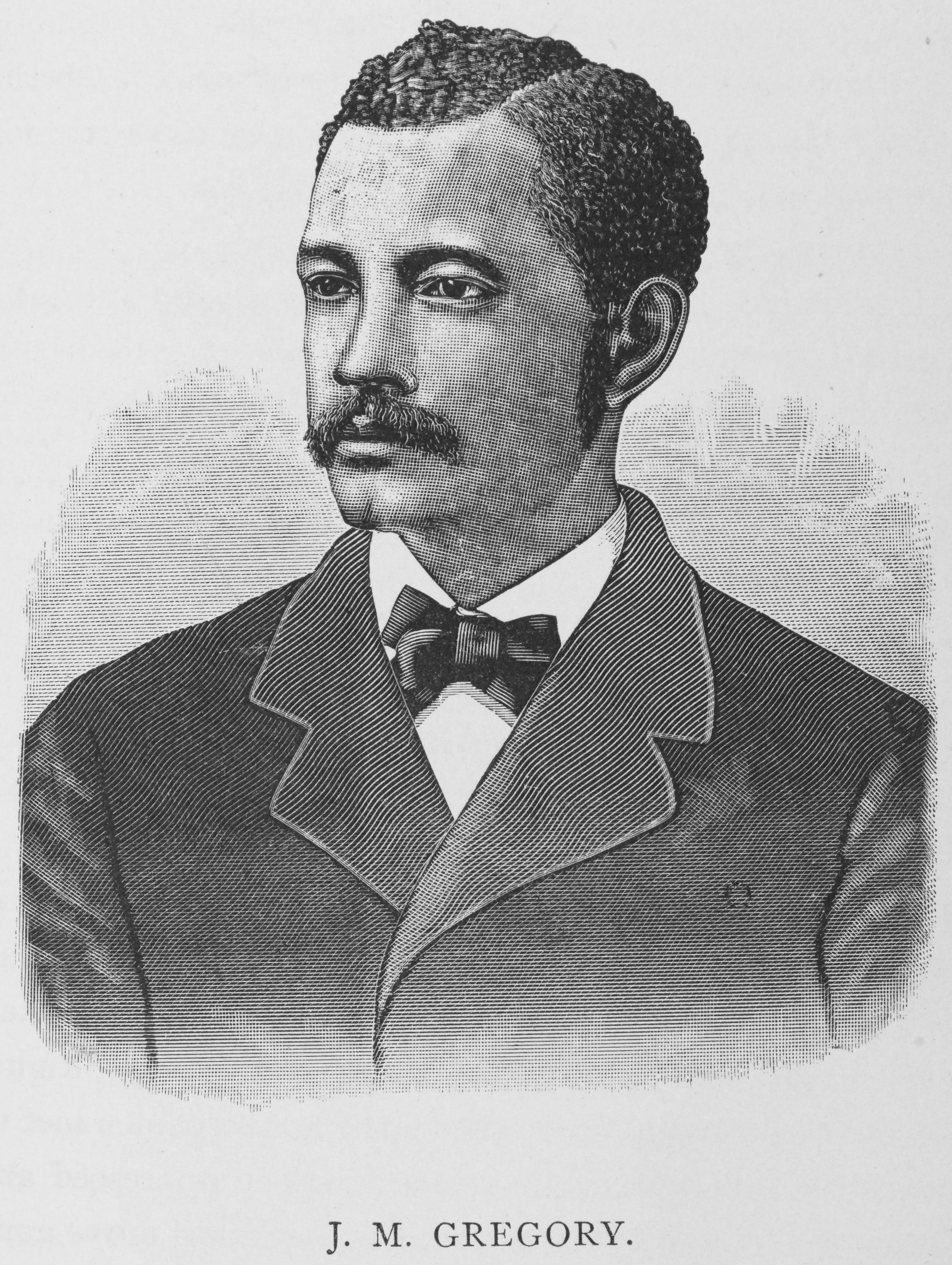
- Gregory in 1887
- Born: January 23, 1849; Lexington, Virginia, United States
- Died: December 17, 1915 (aged 66); Baltimore, Maryland, United States
- Education: Howard University, Harvard University
- Occupation: Professor
- Political party: Republican

James Monroe Gregory (January 23, 1849 – December 17, 1915) was an American professor of Latin, and dean at Howard University. During the American Civil War, he worked in Cleveland for the education and aid of escaped slaves. He initially attended Oberlin College. He transferred to Howard and was the valedictorian of Howard's first graduating class in 1872. He then became a member of faculty, where he served until the late 1880s. During that time he was active in civil rights, particularly related to the education of African American children. He fought to desegregate Washington, D.C., schools in the early 1880s and participated in the Colored Conventions Movement and was a delegate to the 1892 Republican National Convention. In 1890, he founded the American Association of Educators of Colored Youth. In 1893, he published a biography of Frederick Douglass. In 1897, he was removed at Howard and moved to New Jersey where he became principal of Bordentown Industrial and Manual Training School.

== Early life ==
James Monroe Gregory was born in Lexington, Virginia, on January 23, 1849, to Maria A. (Gladman) Gregory and Henry L., a local minister. During that year they moved to Lynchburg, Virginia. In 1859, they moved to Cleveland, Ohio, where James entered public schools. The family moved to La Porte, Indiana, and then Chicago, where James attended private and public schools respectively, before returning to Cleveland where he finished grammar school and entered high school. In 1865, he entered the preparatory department of Oberlin College. During his summer vacations, Gregory taught at Freedmen's Bureau schools in La Porte, in Mt. Tabor, Maryland, and in Lynchburg. One of his teachers in Cleveland was Laura Spelman. As his studies ended, he was recommended for a cadetship at West Point by General Benjamin F. Butler, but President Andrew Johnson refused to appoint him. While visiting Washington, D.C., to get his appointment papers from Butler, he met General Oliver O. Howard, who was impressed by Gregory and suggested that he (Howard) would like to work with him. Less than a year later, Howard had a letter sent to Gregory offering him a position of instructor in the preparatory department of Howard University, and suggesting he finish his undergraduate studies at the same time at Howard, which Gregory accepted. While still in Ohio, Gregory worked to help escaped and freed slaves, and was secretary of the Fugitives Aid Society in Cleveland, later renamed the Freedmen's Aid Society in Cleveland. When Gregory started at Howard in September 1868, he was the first student in the collegiate department, which had two professors, Eliphalet Whittlesey and William F. Bascom, and the course was based on classical studies of New England colleges.

== Career ==
=== Howard University ===
Gregory moved to Washington, D.C., and graduated first in a class of three from Howard in 1872 (the other two were A. C. O'Hear and Josiah T. Settle) and was made tutor of Latin and mathematics in the preparatory department, where he was the only black teacher in the department. In the winter of the next year, he married Fannie E. Hagan of Williamsport, Pennsylvania, who had earlier been a student of his. Three years later he was appointed Professor of Latin in the college. In the 1880s, he was made Dean of the collegiate department. He received a master's degree from Harvard University in 1885.

=== Civil Rights ===
Gregory was a leading figure in Civil Rights Movement in the 1880s. In 1881, Gregory began a fight for the right to send his children to public schools in Washington. In the course of the dispute, Gregory and George T. Downing discovered that a law before the U.S. House of Representatives creating separate schools for black children. The pair along with Charles Purvis created an organization to fight this discrimination. The group gathered about it many leading civil rights figures, having Frederick Douglass as president, Richard T. Greener as secretary, and also including Frederick G. Barbadoes, John F. Cook, Francis James Grimké, Milton M. Holland, Wiley Lane, William H. Smith, Purvis, Downing, and Gregory. The group was supported by representative Dudley C. Haskell of Kansas and succeeded. In 1883, after the Civil Rights Cases saw civil protections for African Americans overturned by the US Supreme Court, Gregory was one of the organizers of mass meetings in protest which included Douglass, Robert Ingersoll, Samuel Shellaberger, and Jeremiah Rankin. He was a leader of the 1883 National Convention of Colored Men in Louisville, Kentucky, where Gregory was elected temporary and then permanent secretary and fellow DC Delegate Frederick Douglass was made president. In 1893, Gregory published a biography of Frederick Douglass entitled, Frederick Douglass the Orator: Containing an Account of His Life; His Eminent Public Services; His Brilliant Career as Orator; Selections from His Speeches and Writings..

=== Politics ===
Gregory was also very active in politics. He was frequently mentioned for political appointments. He was secretary of the Republican Central Committee of the District of Columbia for four years in the 1880s. In 1881, he was endorsed by Oliver Howard, Blanche Kelso Bruce, James Monroe, and John M. Brown to be appointed consul at Leeds, England, but did not receive the appointment. On February 27, 1886, Gregory was appointed to the board of trustees of public schools in Washington DC against vehement protest of Democrats and the conservative press, and the next year was made chairman of the committee on teachers and janitors by the board president. He served on the board for six years. In 1887 he was a candidate to replace James Campbell Matthews as Washington, DC Recorder of Deeds, although the position went to James Monroe Trotter. Gregory was again a candidate for the position to succeed Trotter in late 1889, but the position went to Blanche Bruce. Gregory was president of the American Association of Educators of Colored Youth which was he founded in 1890 and led throughout its existence. He was a delegate to the 1892 Republican National Convention, and expressed interest in the Recorder of Deeds job again, which in 1893 went to C. H. J. Taylor.

=== Removal from Howard and principalship in Bordentown ===
In 1891, Gregory was in debt and was accused by Daniel Murray and a group of other individuals of inappropriate financial dealings with his students, but the charges were dropped. The accusations resurfaced in 1895, and Gregory was removed as professor at Howard by the board led by University president Jeremiah Rankin, although the move was opposed by black members of the board. Gregory was, at the time, the senior professor of the institution, and the institution was itself in debt, which was used as a reason for the dismissal. Gregory appealed, and his cause was widely supported by students and alumni, but his dismissal was upheld. Gregory sued Murray for libel related to the case, which Gregory withdrew when Murray retracted claims he made.

In 1897, he became principal of the Bordentown Industrial and Manual Training School in Bordentown, New Jersey. Gregory was very successful in this role, and the school grew in enrollment and in quality of facilities during his tenure. The school was based on the methods Booker T. Washington advocated and applied at the Tuskegee Institute Gregory served until February, 1915.

== Family and personal life ==
Gregory married Fannie Emma Hagan of Williamsport, Pennsylvania on December 29, 1873, in Williamsport. Fannie was born in Frederick, Maryland, on July 4, 1856. Fannie's mother, Margaret A. Hagen, was born and raised on the property of Judge Roger B. Taney and had been freed by the purchase of her husband. Margaret's mother, Jane, was a daughter of Judge Taney. Margaret's father was Po Mahammitt. His oldest son was Eugene M. Gregory, who graduated from Harvard University and was a member of the Harvard Law School. One son, Thomas Montgomery Gregory, was a noted dramatist. Another son was named James Francis Gregory was captain of the Amherst College baseball team in 1898, the first African American to be elected captain of a baseball team in any eastern college and became a Presbyterian minister and vice-principal at the Bordentown School. His daughter, Margaret B. Gregory, was a teacher at Bordentown School (also known as Ironside school). In 1908, James and Thomas went to London to attend the Olympic Games there.

His great-grandson through James Francis was astronaut Frederick Drew Gregory, the first African-American to pilot an American spacecraft. His great-great-granddaughter is actress and comedian Aisha Tyler.

For many years, Gregory attended Jeremiah Rankin's Washington's First Congregational Church. With Gregory in the congregation were Douglass, John Mercer Langston, Blanche Bruce, and William T. Mitchell and their families.

== Death ==
Gregory died December 17, 1915, at the home of his daughter in Baltimore, Maryland. His funeral was held at the People's Congregational Church in Washington, D.C., and was conducted by Rev. Francis James Grimké. He was buried at Mount Auburn Cemetery in Cambridge, Massachusetts.

== Bibliography ==
- Gregory, James Monroe. Frederick Douglass the Orator: Containing an Account of His Life; His Eminent Public Services; His Brilliant Career as Orator; Selections from His Speeches and Writings. Willey & Company, 1893.
