= Kinard House =

Historic house in South Carolina, United States

- U.S. National Register of Historic Places
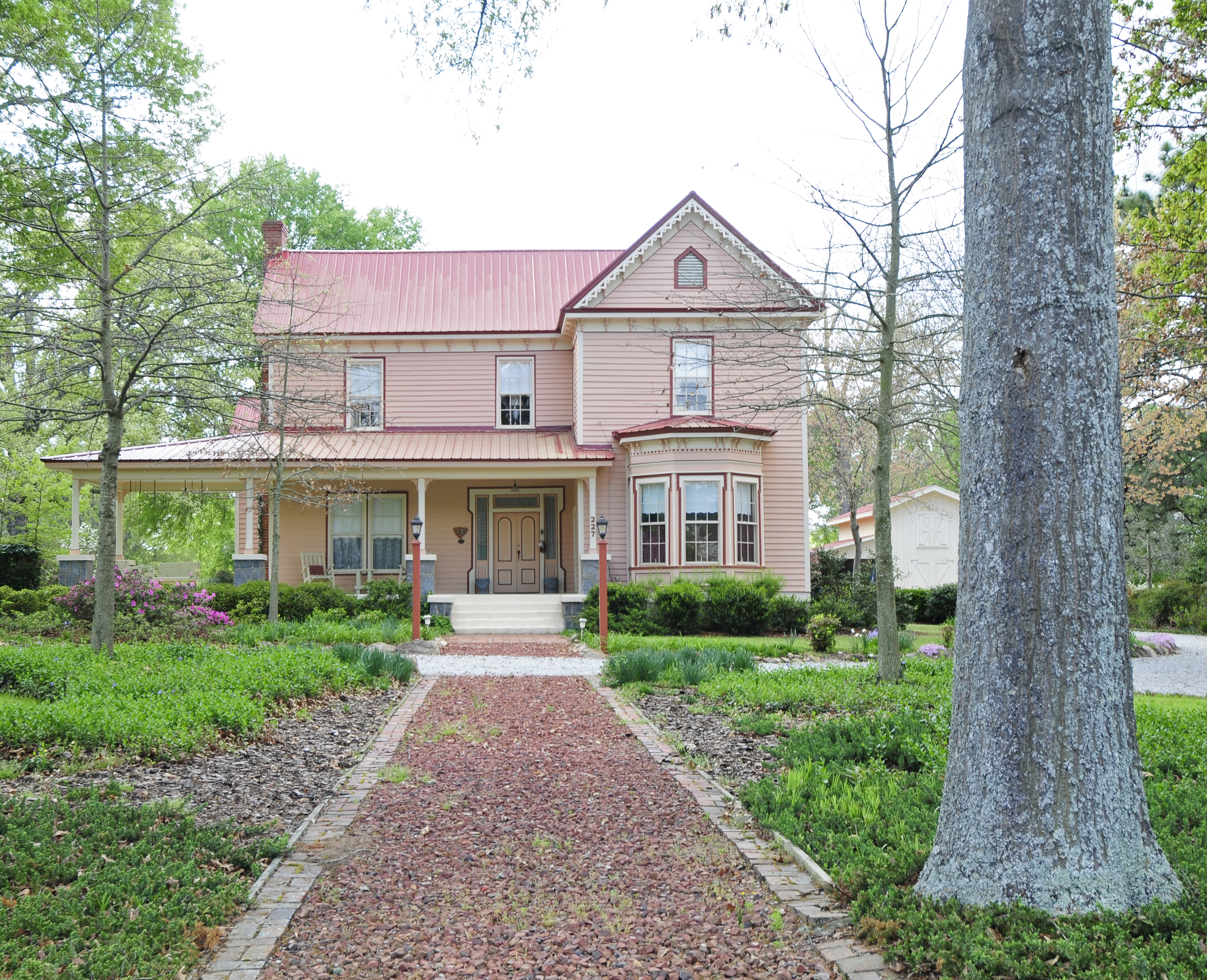
- Kinard House, March 2012

- Location within South Carolina Location within the United States
- Location: 227 W. Main St., Ninety Six, South Carolina
- Coordinates: 34°10′27″N 82°1′42″W
- Area: 1.4 acres (0.57 ha)
- Built: 1885, c. 1920
- Architectural style: Late Victorian, Folk
- NRHP reference No.: 07000119
- Added to NRHP: March 7, 2007

Kinard House is a historic home located at Ninety Six, Greenwood County, South Carolina. It was built about 1885, and is a two-story, five-bay, gable-front-and-wing Folk Victorian dwelling. It is clad in weatherboard and sits on a stone pier foundation. The house was extensively altered about 1920.

It was the home of Henry Jefferson Kinard and his son Drayton Tucker Kinard II, prominent businessmen and public servants who represented Ninety Six and Greenwood County in the South Carolina House of Representatives in the late 19th and early-20th centuries.

It was listed on the National Register of Historic Places in 2007.
