= National Negro Bar Association =

US national bar association

- Abbreviation: NNBA
- Successor: National Bar Association
- Established: 1912; 114 years ago
- Founded at: Little Rock, Arkansas
- Defunct: 1922; 104 years ago
- Type: Nonprofit
- Legal status: bar association
- Purpose: Legal Society for African-American lawyers
- Headquarters: Little Rock, Arkansas
- Location: United States
- Region served: United States (primarily the American South)
- Fields: law
- Members: Approximately 50 attendees at the annual meetings.
- Key people: Josiah T. Settle, Scipio Africanus Jones, Perry W. Howard
- Parent organization: National Negro Business League

The National Negro Bar Association (NNBA) was the first national bar association for African-American lawyers in the United States.

== History ==
The NNBA was founded in Little Rock, Arkansas in 1912. At the time, and for some thereafter, the American Bar Association refused to accept black members, making the NNBA the only national bar association that black lawyers could join. The NNBA's first president was Josiah T. Settle of Memphis, Tennessee, who served as president until 1913. Others active in organizing the NNBA included Scipio Africanus Jones.

The NNBA was an adjunct to the National Negro Business League (NNBL), which had been organized by Booker T. Washington. The NNBA was one of several specialized African-American professional organizations that grew out of the NNBL. The NNBA ultimately foundered due to its members' dissatisfaction with the NNBL's tolerance of racism and unwillingness to advocate aggressively for social change.

The NNBA met annually from 1909 to 1919. The annual meetings attracted around 50 lawyers each year. The membership was dominated by lawyers from the American South.

The attendance of attorney Lutie Lytle at the NNBA's 1913 meeting made history, as she became the first African-American woman to participate in a national bar association.

=== Defunct ===
The NNBA's operations ceased in 1922. The last president of the NNBA was Perry W. Howard, who had also served as the NNBA's first secretary.

In 1925, the National Bar Association (NBA) was formed, taking over the NNBA's previous role as the country's nationwide black bar association. In 1926, NBA president Charles H. Calloway publicly denied any relationship to the old NNBA.

== Works cited ==
- Canton, David A. (2010). Raymond Pace Alexander. p. 28. ISBN 978-1-60473-426-3.
- Hornsby, Alton Jr. (2008). A Companion to African American History. ISBN 978-1-4051-3735-5.
- King, Otis H. (2009). "Legal Profession". Encyclopedia of African American History. Vol. 2. pp. 159–162. ISBN 978-0-19-516779-5.
- Rise, Eric W. (2013). "National Bar Association". In Mjagkij, Nina (ed.). Organizing Black America. p. 354. ISBN 978-1-135-58123-7.
- Smith, J. Clay Jr. (1999). Emancipation: The Making of the Black Lawyer, 1844-1944. ISBN 0-8122-1685-7.
