= Tenant Weatherly =

American Mississippi state legislator

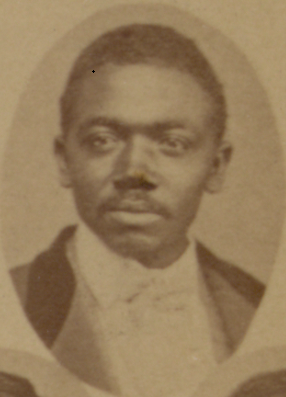
1874 official portrait

Tenant Weatherly (January 1851 - ?) was an American state legislator in Mississippi. He represented Holmes County, Mississippi from 1874 to 1875 and 1880 to 1881 in the Mississippi House of Representatives. He was a Methodist.

Initially no representative was listed for Holmes County in the 1880 legislature as the registrars referred an issue to the House to decide the outcome. The issue had been that the voting box from Acona had been lost or destroyed along with approximately 300 votes. The House decided to elect those with the highest votes from the rest of the county, thus appointing Weatherly along with H. Christmas and C. T. Murphy.

== See also ==
- African American officeholders from the end of the Civil War until before 1900
