= Joseph W. Tolbert =

American politician (1865–1946)

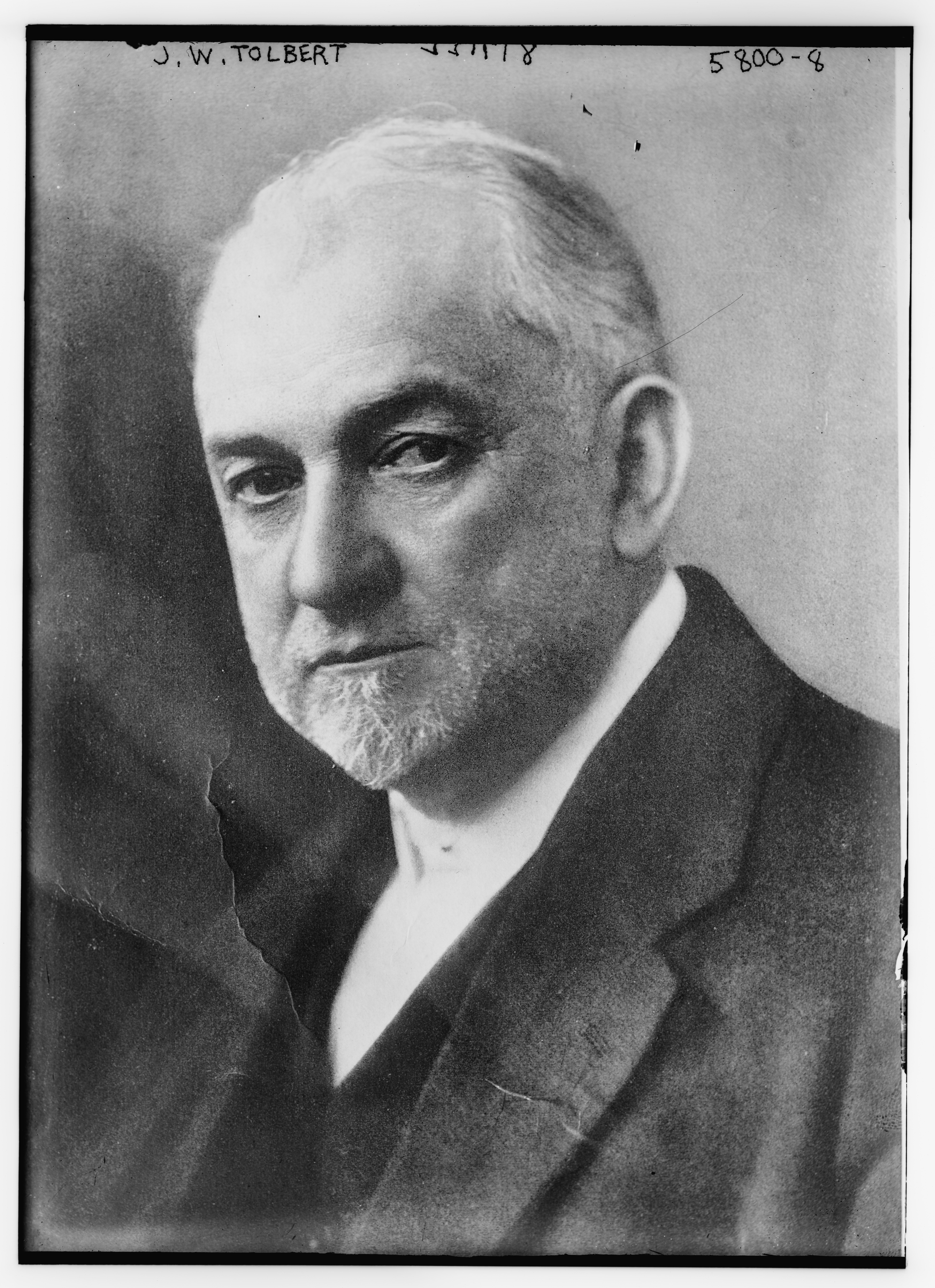

Chairman of the South Carolina Republican Party
- In office 1925–1931
- Preceded by: Rev. R. W. Memminger
- Succeeded by: D.A. Gardner

Personal details
- Born: June 6, 1865 Ninety Six, South Carolina, U.S.
- Died: October 18, 1946 (aged 81) Greenwood, South Carolina, U.S.
- Resting place: Elmwood Cemetery
- Political party: Republican
- Spouse: Julia Elizabeth DeLoach
- Children: 4

Joseph Warren Tolbert (June 6, 1865 – October 18, 1946) was an American politician who served decades as a Republican Party leader and committeeman from South Carolina.

== Early life ==
Joseph Warren Tolbert was born on June 6, 1865, in Ninety Six, South Carolina, the son of John R. Tolbert and Elizabeth Pope (Payne). He operated a cotton patch near his hometown.

== Career ==
Tolbert's political career started when he first attended the 1888 Republican National Convention which nominated Benjamin Harrison for president. In 1922, President Warren G. Harding nominated him to be U.S. Marshal for the Western District of South Carolina, but his confirmation failed in the United States Senate due to opposition from Senator Nathaniel B. Dial. Tolbert was the head of the Black-and-tan faction in South Carolina. In 1932, the Republican National Committee unseated Tolbert's delegation at the 1932 Republican National Convention. In 1936, the party convention seated Tolbert's delegation, overriding the national committee's decision to seat a Lily-white delegation. At the 1940 Republican National Convention, Tolbert led a delegation nominating Robert A. Taft but was not seated. His delegation also failed to be seated in 1944.

== Personal life and death ==
Tolbert was married and had four children. He was widely known by his nickname "Tieless Joe" for his common habit of not wearing a necktie.

Tolbert died on October 19, 1946, in Greenwood, South Carolina, following injuries from a truck collision.
