= Joseph Robert Booker =

American lawyer (1893–1960)

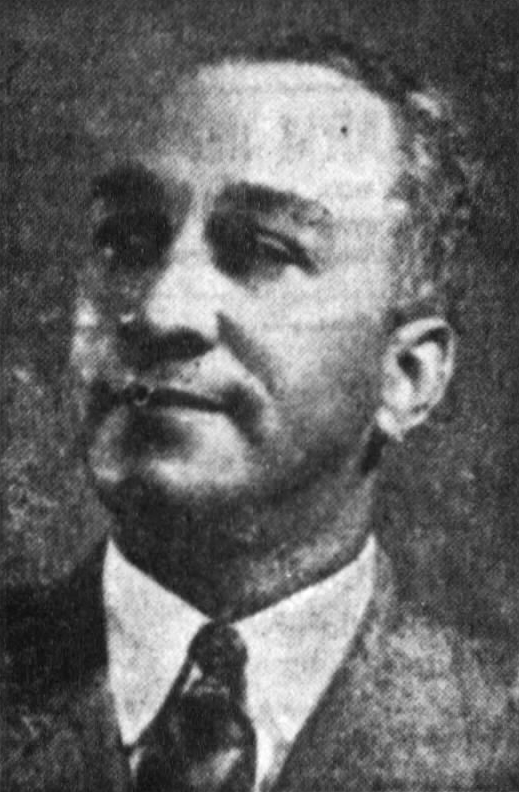
- Born: September 19, 1893; Helena, Arkansas, U.S.
- Died: July 31, 1960 (aged 66)
- Education: Arkansas Baptist College; Northwestern University
- Political party: Republican

Joseph Robert Booker (or J. R. Booker; September 19, 1893 – July 31, 1960) was an African-American civil rights leader, lawyer, and politician from Arkansas.

Booker was born on September 19, 1893, in Helena, Arkansas. His father, Rev. Joseph A. Booker, was president of Arkansas Baptist College from 1887 to 1926. Booker graduated from that school in 1914, received his law degree from Northwestern University in 1917 and returned to Little Rock to practice law. He served in the Army during World War I. Booker worked with attorney Scipio Jones in the appeal of 12 African-American defendants sentenced to death following the race riots in Elaine, Arkansas in 1919, and he was an early member of the first Arkansas branch of the NAACP in 1924.

In 1930 the law firm of Booker & Booker (in partnership with his brother, William A. Booker) joined with Scipio Africanus Jones and J.A. Hibbler in suing the Little Rock Democratic Central Committee on behalf of the Arkansas Negro Democratic Association for the right of African Americans to vote in Democratic primaries. In 1942 Booker, Jones, Hibbler and the NAACP (through attorney Thurgood Marshall) sued the Little Rock School District on behalf of an African-American teacher for equal pay with white teachers.

He also was involved in legal action taken against a 1959 state act requiring teachers to list the organizations to which they belonged. In 1946 he contacted the University of Arkansas School of Law on behalf of a young African-American man who wanted to attend (at that time, the school did not accept black students). Booker was a local "cooperating attorney" with the NAACP in at least five other cases during the 1950s.

From 1949 to 1950, he served as president of the National Bar Association. He also was an alternate delegate to the Republican National Convention from Arkansas in 1944 and 1948. He died on July 31, 1960.

== See also ==
- Booker Arts and Science Magnet Elementary School
