= The Jacksonville Advocate =

African American newspaper in Jacksonville, Florida

The Jacksonville Advocate was a weekly newspaper for African Americans in Jacksonville, Florida established in 1891. It was succeeded by The Jacksonville Advocate-Free Press from 1987 to 1990 and the Jacksonville Free Press.

Ike Williams III served as an editor of the paper.

A Ku Klux Klan member invoked the 5th Amendment but evidence showed he was involved in the bombing of Donal Godfrey's home, a child who had enrolled in the previously all-white Lackawanna Elementary School, and worked to defeat congressman Charles E. Bennett who he sought to replace with a "real white man". Bennett wrote a column that ran in the Advocate.

== See also ==
- List of African-American newspapers in Florida
