= Samuel Vick =

American politician (1863–1946)

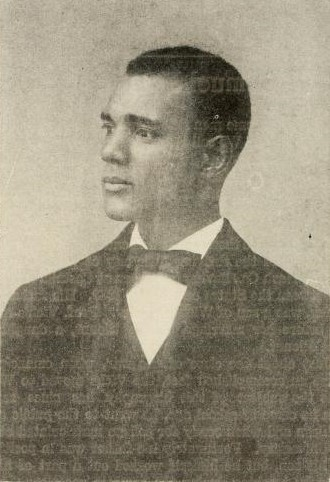
Portrait of Samuel Vick

Samuel Hynes Vick (April 1, 1863 – July 8, 1946) was an American businessman and educator. An active Republican, he served as postmaster of the town of Wilson, North Carolina from 1889 to 1894 and again from 1898 to 1903. He served as a school principal and owned real estate including a hotel and a movie theater.

== Early life ==
Samuel Hynes Vick was born in Castalia, North Carolina on April 1, 1863, to Daniel Vick and Fannie Blount Vick. At the close of the American Civil War, the Vick family moved to Wilson. He attended public school there before attending Lincoln University, covering his school expenses with his father's financial support and money he earned while teaching during summer recesses. He graduated with a Bachelor of Arts degree in 1884.

== Career ==
Following his college graduation, Vick returned to Wilson and worked as a teacher. He built the Orange Hotel in 1906 as the city's first hotel for blacks. He was involved with the Independent Training School and was one of the founders of the Wilson Hospital and Tubercular Home. He established a movie theater in Wilson and invested in real estate, platting and naming several of the city's streets. He also farmed tobacco. He was a member of the masons and Odd Fellows. He served two terms as grand master of the North Carolina chapter of the Odd Fellows.

Vick was politically active and attended Republican National Conventions. He was skeptical of the proposed "Fusion" strategy of cooperation between Republicans in North Carolina and the Populist Party. In September 1889, he was appointed postmaster of Wilson by President Benjamin Harrison at the behest of U.S. Representative Henry P. Cheatham. He was the first black person to hold the office. He served in that capacity until 1894. In May 1898, he was again nominated to the office by President William McKinley at the behest of U.S. Representative George Henry White and subsequently confirmed. He served until February 1903, when his term expired. President Theodore Roosevelt replaced him with a white man at the behest of Senator Jeter C. Pritchard amid the Republican Party's drift towards a "Lily-White" strategy. Vick maintained a positive reputation as postmaster, with newspaper editor Josephus Daniels later describing his ability and character as "beyond reproach".

On May 10, 1892, Vick married Annie Washington, daughter of prominent Wilson resident Jerry Washington. They had nine children.

== Later life ==
Vick died at his home in Wilson on July 8, 1946. Samuel H. Vick Elementary School, originally opened in 1936 in Wilson and later relocated, was named in his honor.

== See also ==
- East Wilson Historic District
- Lawson A. Scruggs

== Works cited ==
- Caldwell, A. B., ed. (1921). History of the American Negro : North Carolina Edition. Atlanta: A. B. Caldwell Publishing Company.
- Justesen, Benjamin R. (2005). "Black Tip, White Iceberg: Black Postmasters and the Rise of White Supremacy in North Carolina, 1897–1901". The North Carolina Historical Review. 82 (2): 193–227. JSTOR 23523507.
- Kenzer, Robert C. (1997). Enterprising Southerners: Black Economic Success in North Carolina, 1865-1915. University of Virginia Press. ISBN 9780813917337.
- Thurtell, Craig (2026). Short of a Revolution: The Fusion Insurgency and the Triumph of Jim Crow in North Carolina. Chapel Hill: University of North Carolina Press. ISBN 9781469689838.
