= Elliott Crayton McCants =

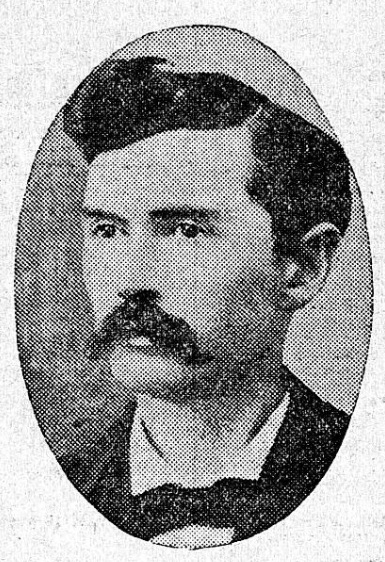
- E. Crayton McCants circa 1904
- Born: September 2, 1865; Ninety Six, South Carolina
- Died: October 23, 1953 (aged 88)
- Occupations: Author, educator

Elliott Crayton McCants (September 2, 1865 – October 23, 1953), was an American writer and educator from South Carolina.

McCants was born outside Ninety Six, South Carolina in 1865, and graduated from The Citadel in 1886.

McCants published his first short story in the New York Evening Post in 1898, and subsequently published many stories in other popular magazines of the day, as well as writing a column for local newspapers. His writings also include the Reconstruction Era novel In the Red Hills (1904), One of the Grayjackets and Other Stories (a short story collection) (1908), Histories, Stories, and Legends of South Carolina (1927), White Oak Farm (1928), and Ninety Six (1930). Much of his writing was set in South Carolina.

He retired from teaching in the late 1940s, having long served as the superintendent of schools for Anderson, South Carolina.

In 1996, he was inducted into the South Carolina Academy of Authors.
