= Perry Howard =

American politician

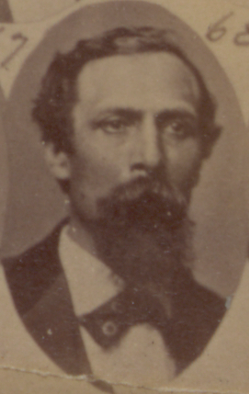
Howard, c. 1874

Perry Wilbon Howard (c. 1835–1907) was an American blacksmith, and a state legislator in Mississippi. He represented Holmes County, Mississippi in the Mississippi House of Representatives from 1872 to 1875; and served on the county board of supervisors.

He was born in c. 1835 into slavery in South Carolina, and was brought to Mississippi before the American Civil War. His children became doctors, an attorney, and teachers. Noted lawyer, Perry Wilbon Howard II was one of his sons.

== See also ==
- African American officeholders from the end of the Civil War until before 1900
