= Perry Wilbon Howard II =

American lawyer (1877–1961)

Perry W. Howard

Member of the Republican National Committee from Mississippi
- In office 1924–1956 Serving with Mary Booze (1924–48) and Edna Redmond (1948–56)
- Preceded by: Michael Mulvihill
- Succeeded by: B.L. "Buddy" Tatum

Personal details
- Born: June 14, 1877 Ebenezer, Mississippi, U.S.
- Died: February 1, 1961 (aged 83) Washington, D.C., U.S.
- Resting place: Arlington National Cemetery, Arlington, Virginia
- Party: Republican
- Children: 1
- Parent(s): Sallie and Perry Wilbon Howard I
- Education: Rust College; Fisk University; DePaul University College of Law

Perry Wilbon Howard II (June 14, 1877 – February 1, 1961), also known as Perry Wilbon Howard, Jr., or usually Perry W. Howard, was an American attorney from Mississippi and partner of a prominent law firm in Washington, D.C. He served as the longtime Republican National Committeeman from the U.S. state of Mississippi from 1924 to 1956, even as he conducted his career in the capital. He was appointed in 1923 as United States Special Assistant to the Attorney General under Warren G. Harding, serving also under Calvin Coolidge, and into Herbert Hoover's administration, resigning in 1928.

Howard was twice tried on corruption-related charges stemming from his effective control over Republican patronage in Mississippi; he was black but was acquitted both times by all-white juries that feared the threat of white Republicans more than they worried about patronage issues. Following the trials, Howard resigned from his post in the United States Department of Justice, but he retained his position as head of the Republican Party in Mississippi and member of the National Committee. He continued to have a successful career as partner and head of the top black law firm in Washington, DC.

Similar to famous activist and leader Booker T. Washington, Howard was considered a "prudent accommodationist," and his speeches often drew more support from whites than blacks. During the time, these stances tended to emphasize economic self-improvement and better race relations as opposed to pushing for immediate, radical changes.

== Biography ==
Howard was born in Ebenezer in Holmes County in central Mississippi on June 14, 1877, as the first son of Sallie and Perry Wilbon Howard, who were enslaved before the Civil War. Highly respected in the community, they bought their own farm land and sent all their seven sons to college. Howard also had a sister Sarah, who later followed him to Washington, DC, as did at least one of his brothers. He was described as mulatto, meaning mixed race with partial European ancestry, as were many African Americans.

Howard graduated from the historically black Rust College in Holly Springs, Mississippi and then studied mathematics at Fisk University in Nashville, Tennessee. He studied law at Illinois College of Law in Chicago. By 1905, Howard had passed the bar, become a member of the Mississippi Bar Association, and was practicing law in the state capital of Jackson. He was among not more than two dozen black lawyers in Mississippi, the second generation of these professional men.

He married in Jackson and had a son, Perry Wilbon Howard III.

Howard became active in Republican Party politics despite the constraints of Mississippi life; most blacks in the state had been disenfranchised in 1890 when the white Democrats passed a new constitution with provisions that created barriers to voter registration, such as poll taxes and a literacy test. Howard served as a delegate to every Republican national convention from 1912 to 1960, the year before his death. He was chosen by Theodore Roosevelt in 1912 to second his nomination as presidential candidate.

Like other aspiring lawyers, Howard left Mississippi for better opportunities, moving to Washington, D.C. He became a partner in the top black law firm in Washington, Howard, Hayes and Davis (later Cobb, Hayes and Howard).

Howard defeated white Republicans to be elected as National Committeeman from Mississippi in 1924, becoming the first black on the Republican National Committee in 25 years. In Mississippi, under white supremacy and the one-party Democratic rule enforced by black disenfranchisement, Republican party members could do little more than manage patronage, the assignment of federal appointed offices in Mississippi. In 1924 Howard was also appointed by President Warren G. Harding as a special assistant to the US Attorney General, becoming the highest-paid black in the government and Harding's first black appointment. Although Howard lived and worked in Washington, D.C., for the rest of his life, he retained his office as Republican National Committeeman of Mississippi and control of its patronage appointments in the state. In other southern states, anti-civil-rights whites began to take over the Republican Party in the early twentieth century after passage of disenfranchisement legislation against blacks. During the 1928 United States presidential election, Howard was selected by Republicans in Kansas City to lead the Mississippi GOP delegation. He also had suggested the nomination of conservative U.S. representative Hamilton Fish III for vice president, stating that the GOP ticket would thereby maintain a stronghold among the black vote in competing against Democratic nominee Alfred E. Smith. The Republican vice presidential nomination ultimately went to United States Senate Majority Leader Charles Curtis, and the Hoover/Curtis ticket defeated the Smith/Robinson ticket in the general election by a landslide.

In 1928, Howard was indicted by a federal grand jury in Mississippi on corruption charges related to purported sale of offices in Mississippi. The grand jury would have been made up of white Democrats, his political opponents; blacks had been largely disenfranchised since 1890 and, excluded as voters, were not allowed to serve on juries. Howard and other black Republican officials were tried in federal court in Jackson. Howard said his “lily white” opponents in the Republican Party, which had fierce internal conflicts and no electoral power, were trying to destroy him as a black leader. Coming after years of investigation and the Harding scandals, the Howard case attracted coverage from such national newspapers as the New York Times.

Howard was suspended from his position in the Department of Justice under President Calvin Coolidge before the first trial. Herbert Hoover, who had been elected as president during the machinations of investigation and indictment, was considered interested in cleaning up corruption but also in appealing to southern whites. Many people believed that he allowed the prosecution of Howard in order to attract whites to the Republican Party, as many appealed to him to reduce the black influence. The "specter of white Republicanism" so alarmed the Democrats, because it would threaten their political dominance of the state, that Democratic figures such as Governor Theodore Gilmore Bilbo and Colonel Frederick Sullens, editor of the Jackson Daily News, spoke out in Howard's defense.

Howard was twice acquitted on patronage corruption charges by all-white juries in Jackson and Meridian. In the first trial, the defense noted that Howard had given more than 90% of the patronage jobs at his command to Democrats. During the trials and before jury selection was complete, Sullens published stories about the threat of a white Republican party to the Democrats. The Department of Justice decided not to try another case. Howard resigned from the government but returned to Washington, D.C., where he was influential in the Republican Party. President Hoover, however, recognized only his "lily-white rival", Lamont Rowlands of the Mississippi Republican party, during the rest of his term.

In 1942, Howard gave his support to a resolution putting the National GOP on record against the violation of the First Amendment rights of black Republicans by the Memphis political machine led by E. H. Crump. After hearing the details, Howard responded that he had observed “no more pronounced evidence of the failure of Democracy than the Nordic outburst at Memphis.” Howard only dropped the effort after his friend and black Memphis Republican ally, Robert Church Jr. urged him to call it off. Church feared that a resolution might jeopardize an intended prosecution of the Crump machine by the Civil Rights Section of the Department of Justice. Despite compelling evidence of massive violations of free speech rights, top officials of the Department of Justice, well aware of Roosevelt's close and friendly political ties with Crump, vetoed plans for a prosecution.

Despite opposition within Mississippi and criticism from national black leaders, Howard was pragmatic about dealing with local conditions. He held on to his position until 1956 as Republican National Committeeman from Mississippi, while working and living in the capital. He led U.S. Senator Robert A. Taft's Southern delegation at the 1952 Republican National Convention in Chicago. Taft, however, lost the party nomination to Dwight D. Eisenhower.

In 1956, the Howard forces (long called the "Blacks and Tans" for their biracial character) began to be challenged anew for control of the Mississippi state party by a white conservative faction led by Wirt Yerger, an insurance agent in Jackson.

Howard managed to survive political swings and continued to serve as the Republican National Committeeman almost until his death. He died on February 1, 1961.

Mary Booze of Mound Bayou, an all-black community in Bolivar County in northwestern Mississippi, served alongside Howard as the national Republican committeewoman from 1924 to 1948. She was the first African-American woman to sit on the RNC.
