= Black-owned business =

Business enterprise owned by one or more African-Americans

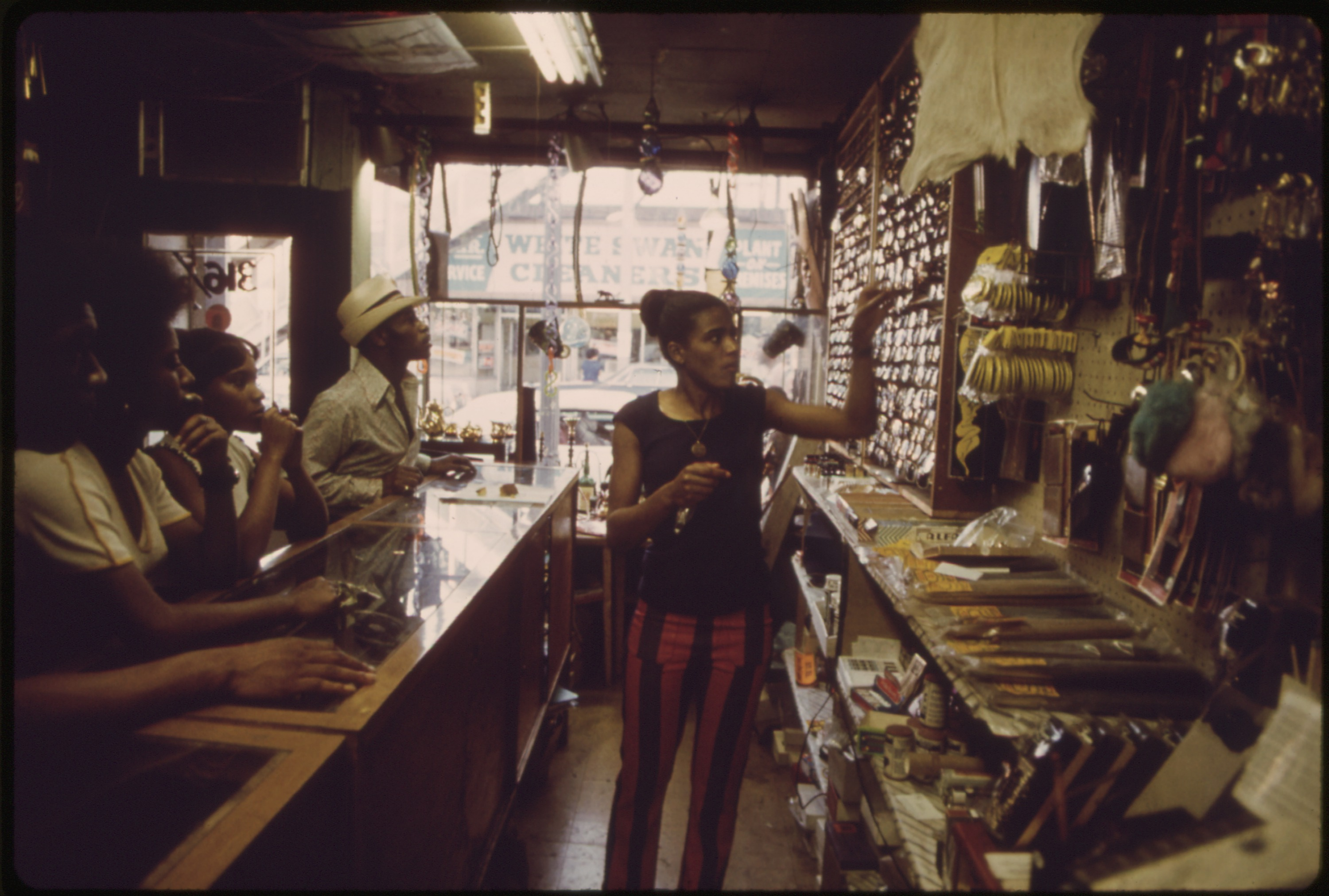
Black-owned business in Chicago

In the United States, black-owned businesses (or black businesses), also known as African American businesses, originated in the days of slavery before 1865. Emancipation and civil rights permitted businessmen to operate inside the American legal structure starting in the Reconstruction era (1865–77) and afterwards. By the 1890s, thousands of small business operations had opened in urban areas. The most rapid growth came in the early 20th century, as the increasingly rigid Jim Crow system of segregation moved urban blacks into a community large enough to support a business establishment. The National Negro Business League—which Booker T. Washington, college president, promoted—opened over 600 chapters. It reached every city with a significant black population.

African-Americans have operated virtually every kind of company, but some of the most prominent black-owned businesses have been insurance companies including North Carolina Mutual Life Insurance Company, banks, recording labels, funeral parlors, barber shops, cosmetics, beauty salons, newspapers, restaurants, soul food restaurants, real estate, record stores, and bookstores.

The Census Bureau's 2024 Annual Business Survey, covering reference year 2023, estimated that the United States had about 201,000 Black or African American-owned employer businesses, 3.4 percent of all employer firms. They had $249.0 billion in receipts, 1.9 million employees, and $69.8 billion in annual payroll.

Early achievers

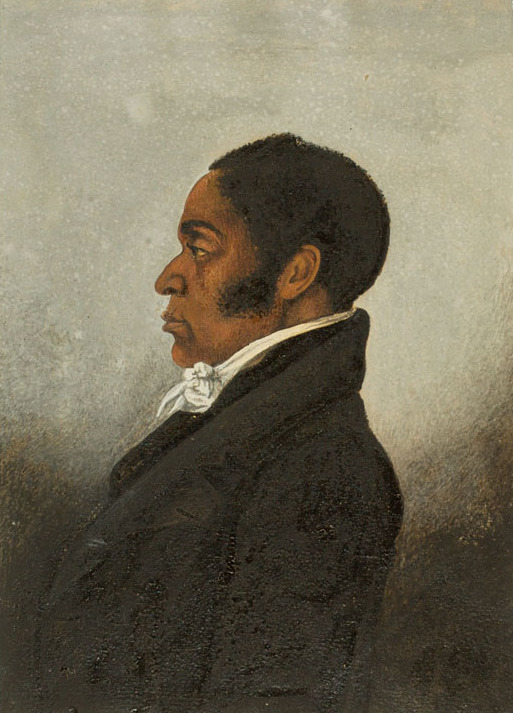
Watercolor of James Forten (1766–1842), the wealthiest Black man of his time in Philadelphia, and believed to have been painted during his lifetime

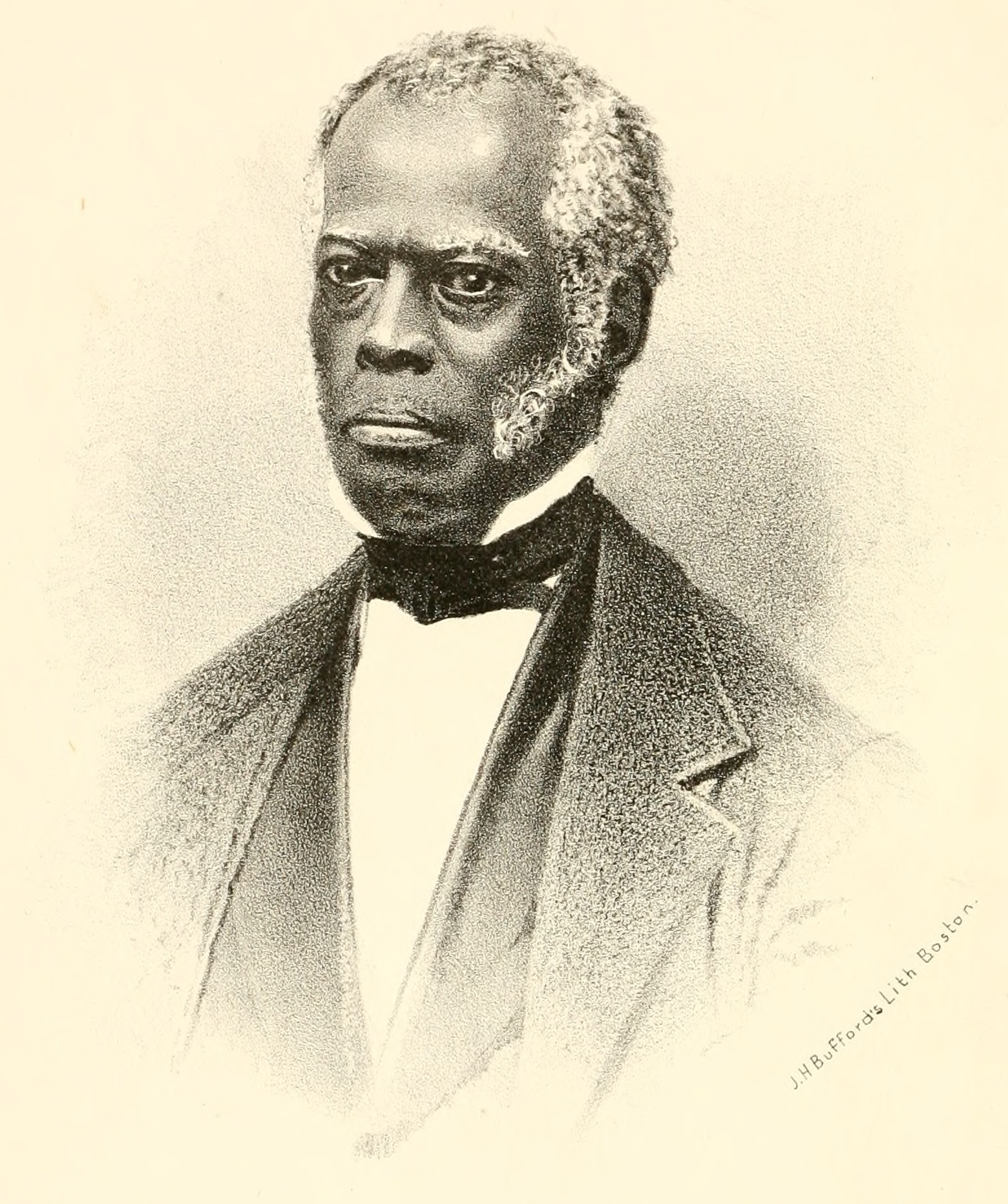
A lithograph of noted abolitionist and autobiographer Lunsford Lane (1803–c. 1863) reproduced in William George Hawkins' biography of him

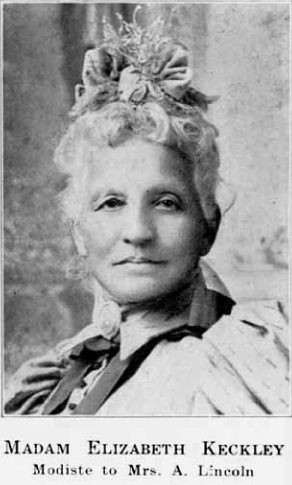
Portrait of Elizabeth Keckley, abolitionist, seamstress to First Lady Lincoln and autobiographer, date unknown

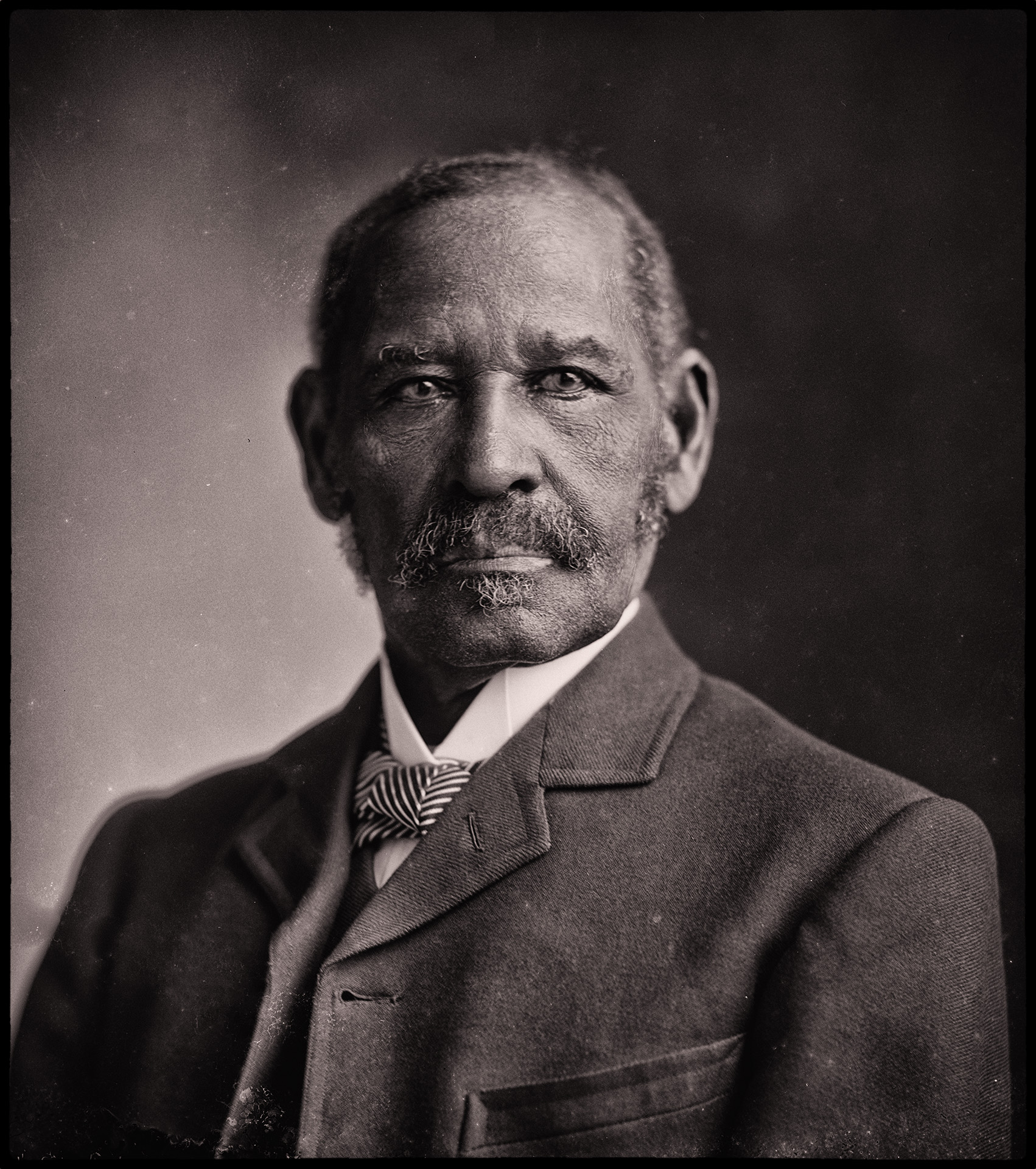
Portrait of businessman, autobiographer and politician Mifflin Wistar Gibbs in 1902

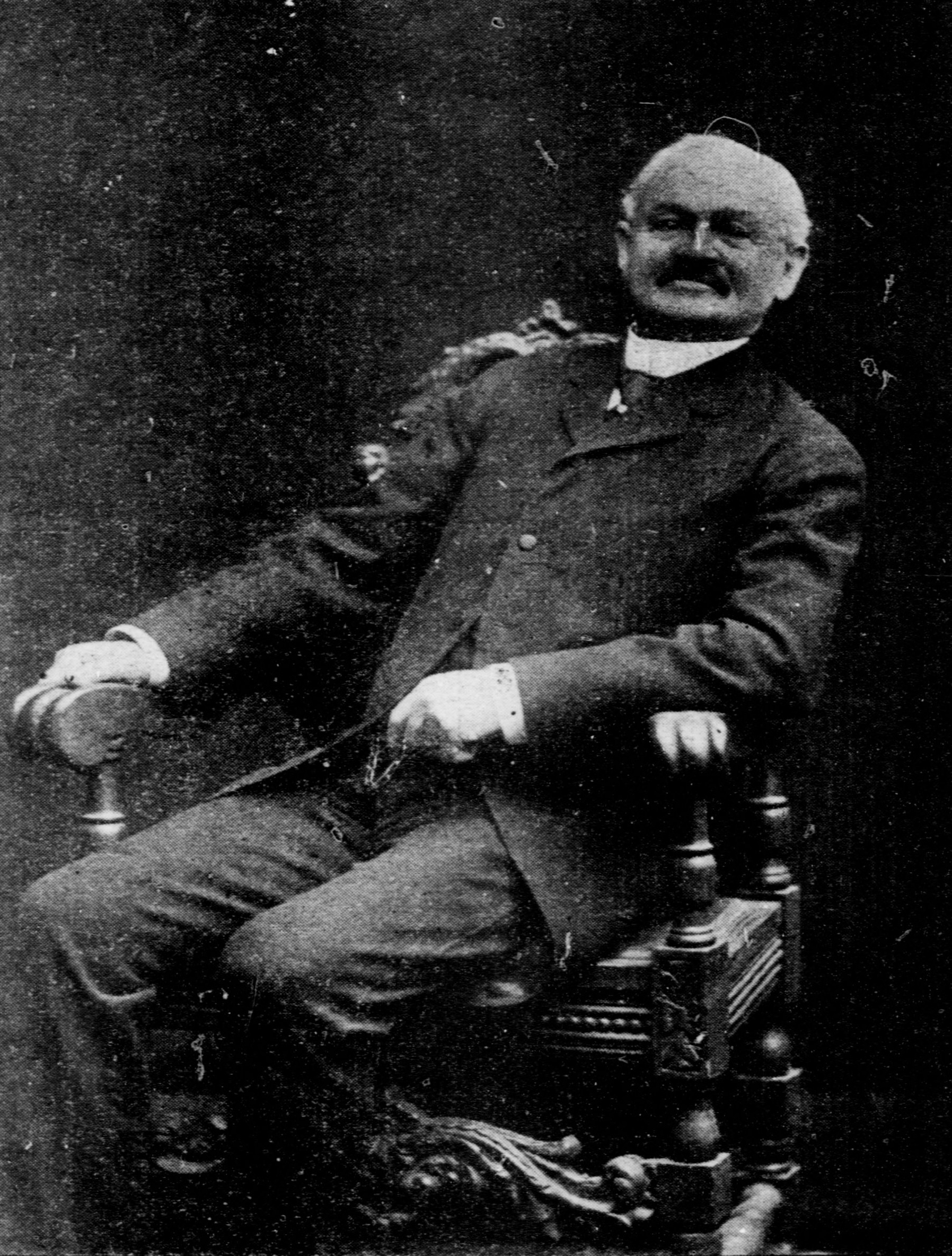
Real estate mogul Robert Reed Church, the South's first Black millionaire, in a photograph for the Washington D.C.-based newspaper "The Colored American," in 1903

By 1920, there were tens of thousands of black businesses, the great majority of them quite small. The largest were insurance companies. The League had grown so large that it supported numerous offshoots, serving bankers, publishers, lawyers, funeral directors, retailers and insurance agents. The Great Depression of 1929-39 was a serious blow, as cash income fell in the black community because of very high unemployment, and many smaller businesses closed down. During World War II many employees and owners switched over to high-paying jobs in munitions factories. Black businessmen generally were more democrat elements of their community, but typically did support the Civil Rights Movement. By the 1970s, federal programs to promote minority business activity provided new funding, although the opening world of mainstream management in large corporations attracted a great deal of talent. Black entrepreneurs originally based in music and sports diversified to build "brand" names that made for success in the advertising and media worlds.

== Before emancipation (until 1865) ==
Black entrepreneurship can be traced back to when Africans were first forcibly brought to North America in the 16th century. Many African-Americans who gained their freedom from slavery opened their own businesses, and even some enslaved African-Americans were able to operate businesses, either as skilled tradespeople or as minor traders and peddlers. Enslaved African-Americans operated businesses both with and without their owners' permission. Although, those who operated businesses without owners permission risked punishment if caught. Free blacks facing a generally hostile environment occasionally operated small businesses. Profit-making businesses were created by more free and enslaved African-Americans than one might realize from the usual survey of antebellum America. When the opportunity presented itself, it was taken by these men and women, sometimes timidly, sometimes whole-heartedly, and often endorsed by the masters of the enslaved. Businesses often evolved out of skills or specialties the business owner, or service provider, already knew. Examples include:

- Tobacconist – As a young enslaved man, Lunsford Lane recalls selling a basket of peaches for money he could keep and very soon, he says, "plans for money-making took the principal possession of my thoughts." In six to eight years he had amassed one thousand dollars, enough to purchase his freedom, as we read from The Narrative of Lunsford Lane (1842).
- Shoemaker – William J. Brown was born into a free black family in Rhode Island and as a young man faced discrimination and often unethical treatment from whites as he strove to pursue a trade and career. In his selection from his Life of William J. Brown of Providence, R. I. (1883) we read his frustrating experiences as a store clerk and apprentice shoemaker.
- Sailmaker – James Forten Sr., a freeman and grandfather of Charlotte Forten (see #3: Free-born), learned the sail-making trade after the Revolution, bought his employer's business, and later became the wealthiest black man in Philadelphia. In this 1835 article from the white journal The Anti-Slavery Record, a white reporter describes a visit to Forten's sailmaking business.
- Barber – After being emancipated by his enslaver in 1820, William Johnson became a successful black businessman in Natchez, Mississippi, operating a barber shop, loaning money and acquiring real estate.
- Merchant – Free-born in Philadelphia, Mifflin Gibbs became a businessman, lawyer, politician, and abolitionist. For several years he operated a clothing store in San Francisco, which he we learn from his autobiography Shadow and Light (1902).
- Dressmaker – After purchasing her freedom in St. Louis, Elizabeth Keckley moved to Washington, DC, and became the dressmaker for Mary Todd Lincoln, producing elegant gowns for the capital's elite women. Her 1868 autobiography Behind the Scenes display her ardor and initiative in creating her business and her life.

== Reconstruction (1865–1900) ==
Emancipation and civil rights permitted businessmen to operate inside the American legal structure starting in the Reconstruction Era (1863–77) and afterwards. By the 1890s, thousands of small business operations had opened in urban areas.

From the late 1880s there was a remarkable development of Negro business – banks and insurance companies, undertakers and retail stores.... It occurred at a time when Negro barbers, tailors, caterers, trainmen, blacksmiths, and other artisans were losing their white customers. Depending upon the Negro market, the promoters of the new enterprises naturally upheld the spirit of racial self-help and solidarity.

Memphis Tennessee was the base for Robert Reed Church (1839–1912), a freedman who became the South's first black millionaire. He made his wealth from speculation in city real estate, much of it after Memphis became depopulated after the yellow fever epidemics. He founded the city's first black-owned bank, Solvent Savings Bank and Trust, ensuring that the black community could get loans to establish businesses. He was deeply involved in local and national Republican politics and directed patronage to the black community. His son Robert Reed Church Jr., became a major politician in Memphis. He was a leader of black society and a benefactor in numerous causes.

Black communities were undoubtedly negatively affected by the enforcement of racial segregation in cities and urban areas where blacks were limited in what residential areas they could occupy. Whether in the South or the North, segregation limited the social, educational, and economic progress of the varying black communities forced into this racist social practice. However, new economic, anthropological and census research conducted establishes how black communities in the North during the late 19th century fought against racial segregation by donning new attitudes towards commerce and entrepreneurship. Racial segregation in the North during the late 19th century saw a considerable rise in black entrepreneurship and black-owned small businesses within their respective communities. These small business owners were able to take advantage of constraints placed upon the African-American communities, and exploit a market of untapped black consumers that at the time were not allowed a great deal of purchasing power in white economic markets. This rise in "negro markets" as framed by St. Clair Drake and Horace R. Clayton in Black Metropolis occurred in the South Side of cities like Chicago where African-Americans established a region of their own where the number of black-owned businesses reached 2,500 by 1937 in South Side Chicago.

== The Golden Age (1900–1930) ==
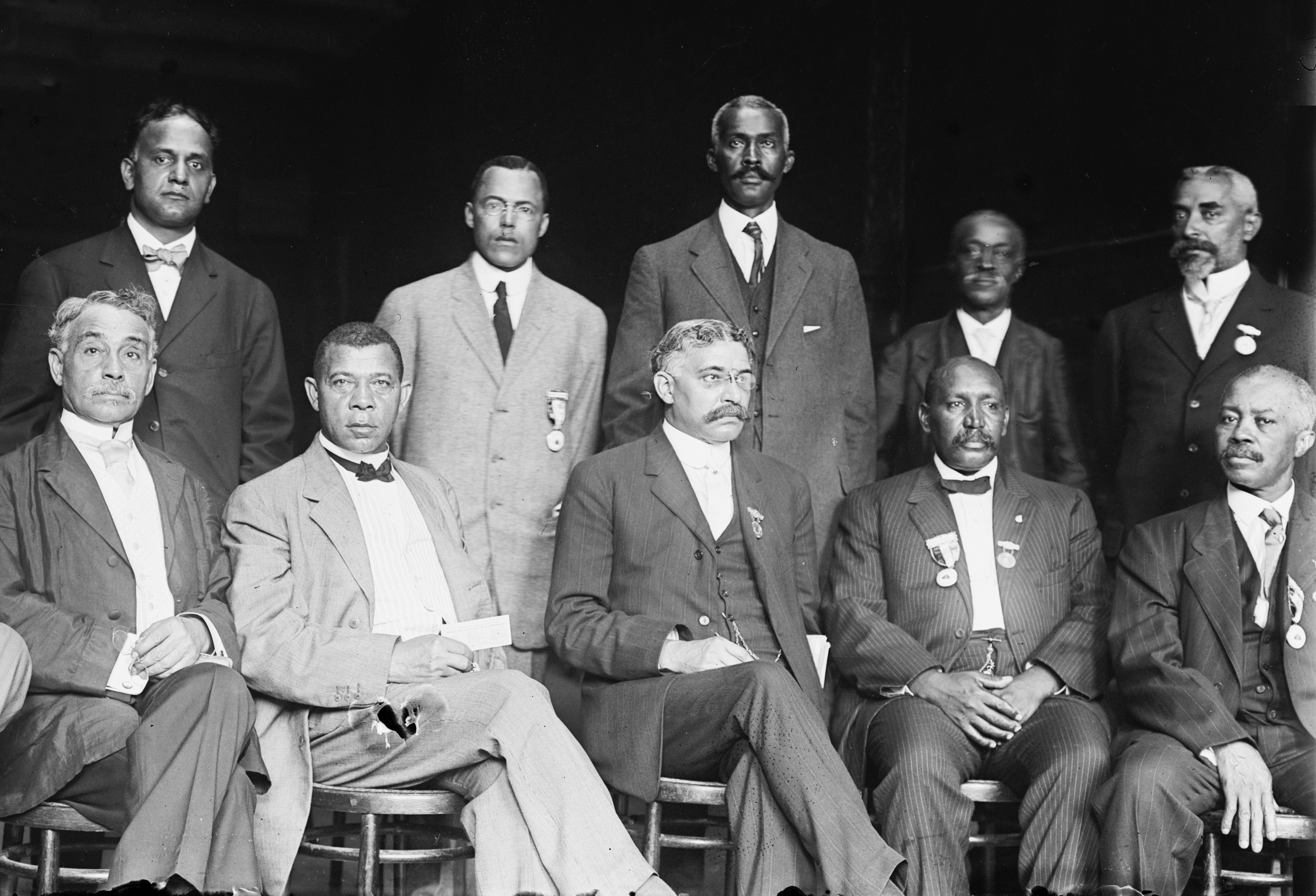
Booker T. Washington (seated second from left) founded the National Negro Business League, in Boston in 1900 to promote African-American business interests. By 1905 it had 320 chapters. By 1915, it had more than 600 chapters in 34 states. In 1966, it was renamed the National Business League, and relocated to Washington, D.C., where it remains active.

The nadir of race relations was reached in the early 20th century, in terms of political and legal rights. Blacks were increasingly segregated. However the more they were cut off from the larger white community, the more black entrepreneurs succeeded in establishing flourishing businesses that catered to a black clientele.

The most rapid growth came in the early 20th century as the increasingly rigid Jim Crow system of segregation moved urban blacks into a community large enough to support a business establishment. The National Negro Business League, promoted by college president Booker T. Washington, opened over 600 chapters, reaching every city with a significant black population.

By 1920, there were tens of thousands of black businesses, the great majority of them quite small. The largest were insurance companies. The League had grown so large that it supported numerous offshoots, including the National Negro Bankers Association, the National Negro Press Association, the National Association of Negro Funeral Directors, the National Negro Bar Association, the National Association of Negro Insurance Men, the National Negro Retail Merchants' Association, the National Association of Negro Real Estate Dealers, and the National Negro Finance Corporation. The Great Depression of 1929-39 was a serious blow, as cash income fell in the black community because of unemployment and many smaller businesses closing down. During World War II many employees can indeed owners switched over to high-paying jobs in munitions factories. Black businessmen generally were more conservative elements of their community, but typically did support the civil rights movement. By the 1970s, federal programs to promote minority business activity provided new funding, although the opening world of mainstream management attracted a great deal of talent.

In urban areas, North and South, the size and income of the black population was growing, providing openings for a wide range of businesses, from barbershops to insurance companies. Undertakers had a special niche, and often played a political role.

The number of black-owned businesses doubled from 20,000 in 1900 to 40,000 in 1914. There were 450 undertakers in 1900, but by 1914 they had doubled to 1000. The number of drugstores rose from 250 to 695. The number of retail merchants – most of them quite small – jumped from 10,000 to 25,000.

— The National Negro Business League

Historian Juliet Walker calls 1900–1930 the "Golden age of black business." According to the National Negro Business League, the number black-owned businesses doubled from 20,000 1900 and 40,000 in 1914. There were 450 undertakers in 1900 and, rising to 1000. Drugstores rose from 250 to 695. Local retail merchants – most of them quite small – jumped from 10,000 to 25,000.

One of the leading centers of black business was Atlanta. According to August Meier and David Lewis, 1900 was the turning point as white businessmen reduced their contacts with black customers, black entrepreneurs rush to fill the vacuum by starting banks, insurance companies, and numerous local retailers and service providers. Furthermore, the number of black doctors and lawyers increased sharply. All this of course was in addition to the traditional businesses, such as undertakers and barbershops that had always depended on a black clientele. Durham, North Carolina, a new industrial city based on tobacco manufacturing and cotton mills, was noted for the growth of its black businesses. Durham lacked traditionalism based on plantation-era slavery, and practiced a laissez-faire that allowed black entrepreneurs to flourish.

College president Booker T. Washington (1856–1915), who ran the National Negro Business League, was the most prominent promoter of black business. He moved from city to city to sign up local entrepreneurs into his national network the National Negro Business League.

In 1915, C.R. Patterson and Sons under the leadership of Frederick Patterson, founded the first African-American car manufacturing company of the Greenfield-Patterson car which remained active until 1939.

By the 1920s, the federal government had set up a small unit to distribute information to black entrepreneurs, but no financial aid was forthcoming.

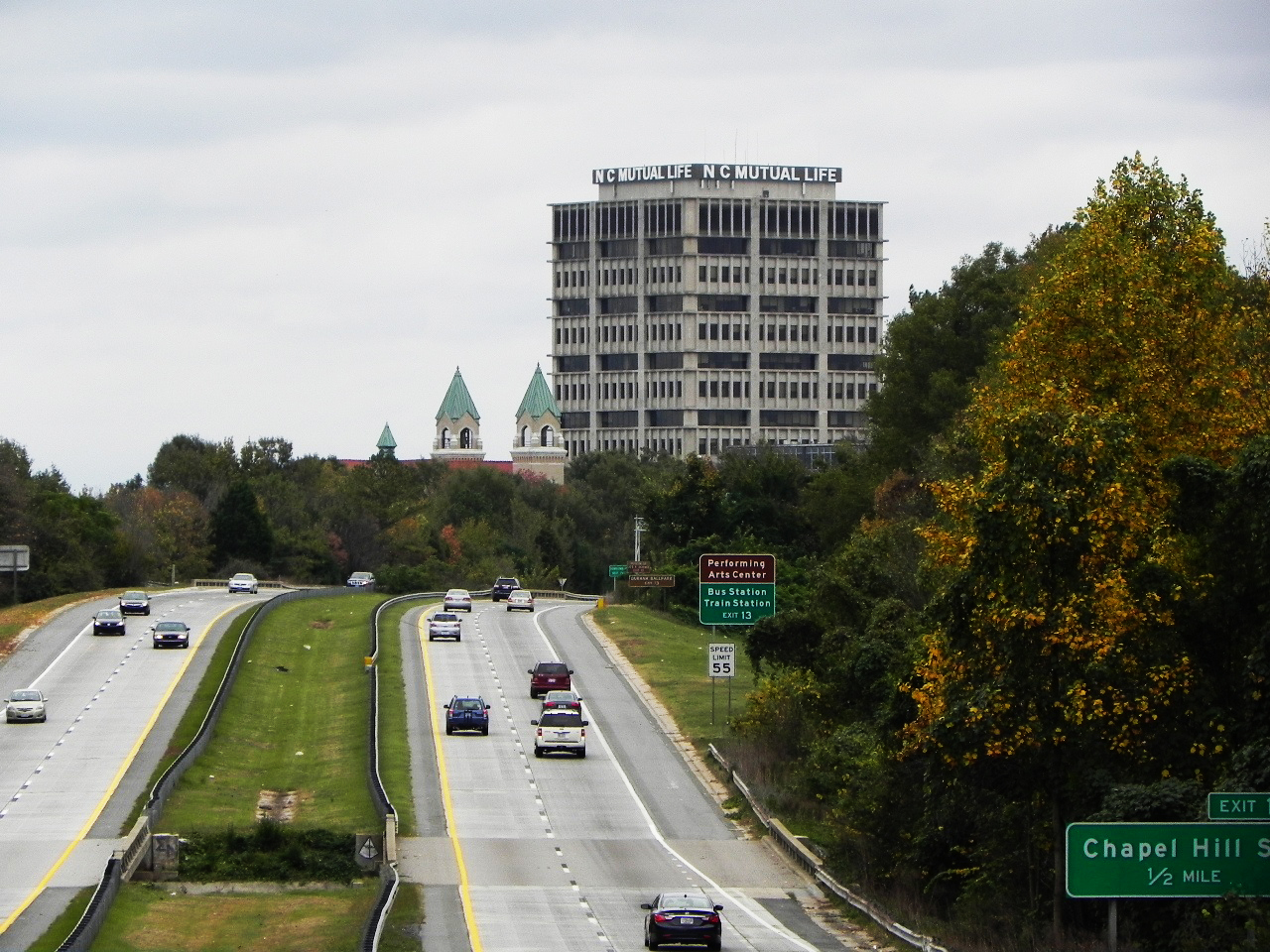
The North Carolina Mutual Life Insurance Company headquarters in Durham N.C.

By far the most prominent black entrepreneur of the century of was Charles Clinton Spaulding (1874 – 1952), president of North Carolina Mutual Life Insurance Company in Durham, North Carolina. It was the nation's largest black-owned business. It operated a system of industrial insurance, whereby its salesmen collected small premiums of about 10 cents every week from its clients. That provided them insurance for the following week; if the client died the salesman immediately arranged payment of the death benefit of about $100. That paid for suitable funeral, which was a high prestige event to the black community. Black undertakers also benefited and themselves became prominent business men. By 1970, they grossed more than $120 million for 150,000 race funerals each year.

African-Americans were tourist entrepreneurs in certain resort areas, such as Oak Bluffs, Massachusetts, and developed on a greater scale, Idlewild, Michigan.

== Newspapers and magazines ==
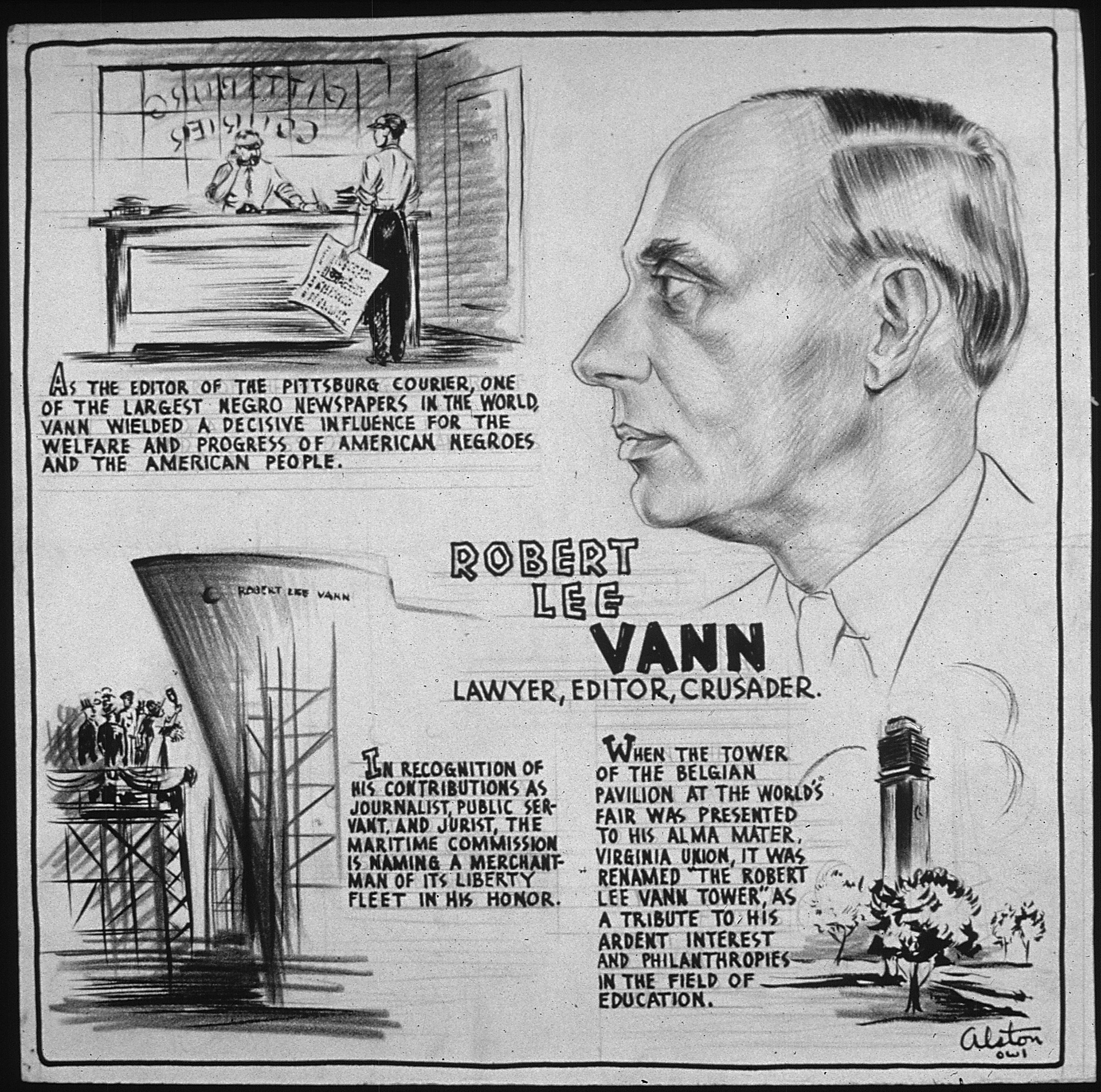
Poster from the U.S. Office of War Information, 1943

African-American newspapers flourished in the major cities, with publishers playing a major role in politics and business affairs. Representative leaders included Robert Sengstacke Abbott (1870–1940), publisher of the Chicago Defender; John Mitchell Jr. (1863–1929), editor of the Richmond Planet and president of the National Afro-American Press Association; Anthony Overton (1865–1946), publisher of the Chicago Bee, and Robert Lee Vann (1879–1940), the publisher and editor of the Pittsburgh Courier. Leon H. Washington Jr. founded the Los Angeles Sentinel in 1933.

John H. Johnson (1918–2005) was the founder of the Johnson Publishing Company in 1942. He rose from poverty to millionaire by the time he was thirty-one. In 1982, he became the first African-American to appear on the Forbes 400. Johnson's Ebony (magazine)|Ebony and Jet (magazine|)Jet magazines were among the most influential African-American media by 1950.

== Beauty entrepreneurs ==
Most of the African-Americans in business were men, however, women played a major role especially in the area of beauty. Standards of beauty were different for whites and blacks, and the black community developed its own standards, with an emphasis on hair care. Beauticians could work out of their own homes and did not need storefronts. As a result, black beauticians were numerous in the rural South, despite the absence of cities and towns. They pioneered the use of cosmetics, at a time when rural white women in the South avoided them. As Blain Roberts has shown, beauticians offered their clients a space to feel pampered and beautiful in the context of their own community because, "Inside black beauty shops, rituals of beautification converged with rituals of socialization." Beauty contests emerged in the 1920s, and in the white community, they were linked to agricultural county fairs. By contrast in the black community, beauty contests were developed out of the homecoming ceremonies at their high schools and colleges.

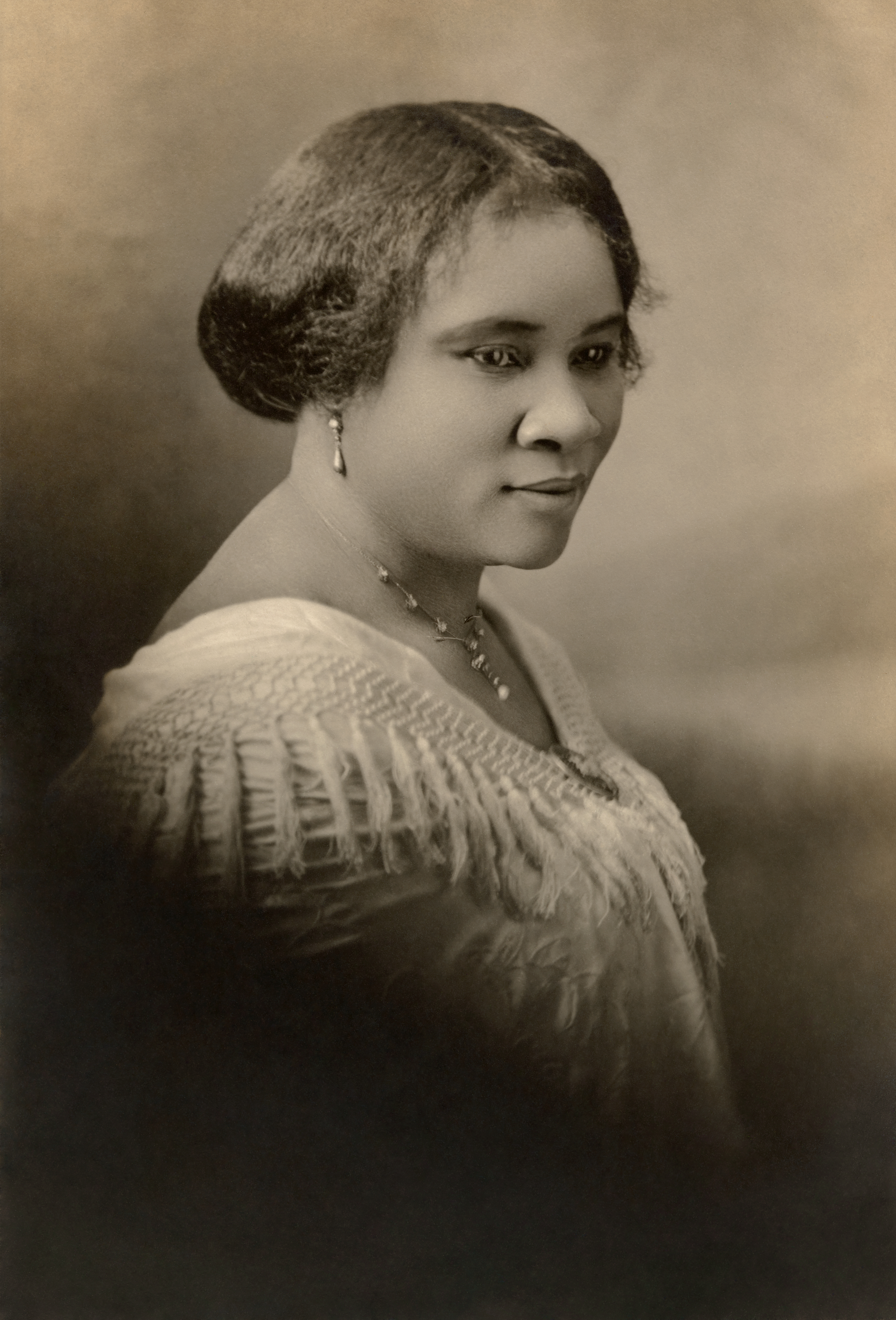
Madam C.J. Walker, the first self-made woman millionaire in the U.S., photographed between 1905 and 1914

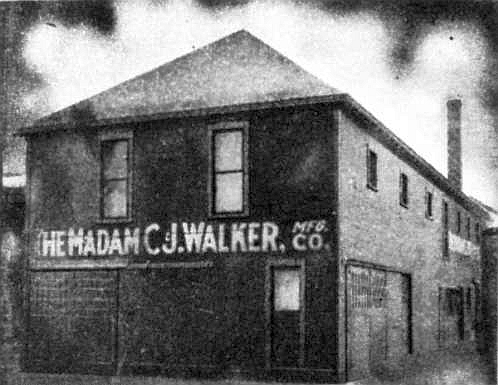
A photo of Walker's manufacturing plant in Indianapolis, Indiana, 1911

The most famous entrepreneur was Madame C.J. Walker (1867–1919); she built a national franchise business called Madame C.J. Walker Manufacturing Company based on her invention of the first successful hair straightening process. Marjorie Joyner (1896–1994) was the first black graduate of a beauty school in Chicago, where she got to know Madame Walker and became her agent. By 1919 Joyner was the national supervisor over Walker's 200 beauty schools. A major role was sending their hairstylists door-to-door, dressed in black skirts and white blouses with black satchels containing a range of beauty products that were applied in the customer's house. Joyner taught some 15,000 stylists over her fifty-year career. She was also a leader in developing new products, such as her permanent wave machine. She helped write the first cosmetology laws for the state of Illinois and founded both a sorority and a national association for black beauticians. Joyner was friends with Eleanor Roosevelt, and helped found the National Council of Negro Women. She was an advisor to the Democratic National Committee in the 1940s and advised several New Deal agencies trying to reach out to black women. Joyner was highly visible in the Chicago black community, as head of the Chicago Defender Charity network, and fundraiser for various schools. In 1987 the Smithsonian Institution in Washington opened an exhibit featuring Joyner's permanent wave machine and a replica of her original salon.

The leading beauty salon for black women in Washington was operated by the sisters Elizabeth Cardozo Parker (1900–1981) and Margaret Cardozo Holmes (1898–1991) from 1929 to 1971. The Cardozo Sisters Hair Stylists expanded to five storefronts stretching an entire city block near the campus of Howard University, with 25 employees assisting up to 200 clients a day. They had a voice in the national beauticians community, and demanded an end to discriminatory practices.

Rose Meta Morgan (1912–2008) founded the House of Beauty salon to promote African-American standards of beauty, in opposition to those "white" standards that sought silky straight hair and light skin. Born in rural Mississippi, she moved to Chicago as a child and showed entrepreneurial skills as a teenager. She relocated to New York City in 1938, where her small beauty shop became the world's largest African-American beauty parlor. She staged fashion shows in Harlem, and sold her brand of cosmetics designed "to glorify a woman of color". She was briefly married to the famous heavyweight boxing champion Joe Louis from 1955 to 1958. In 1965 she founded New York City's only black commercial bank, Freedom National Bank; in 1972 she set up a franchise operation for beauticians. Vera Moore (b 1950) marketed her unique brands of Vera Moore Cosmetics, including some products developed by her husband. She opened stores and upscale malls and had superstars as clients.

== Small business ==
In addition to the more prominent businesses listed above, African-Americans have strong traditions of owning and operating small businesses such as restaurants, drug stores, newsstands, corner stores, candy shops, liquor stores, groceries, bars, and gas stations.

African-Americans also have a length history of ownership in music-related businesses, including record stores, nightclubs, and record labels. African-American bookstores were closely tied to radical political movements, including Black Power, black nationalism, pan-Africanism, and Marxism. African-American-owned funeral homes also served an important role during the civil rights movement. These spaces allowed for the violence committed by white citizens to be made more public through photography and television.

== "Double duty dollars" ==
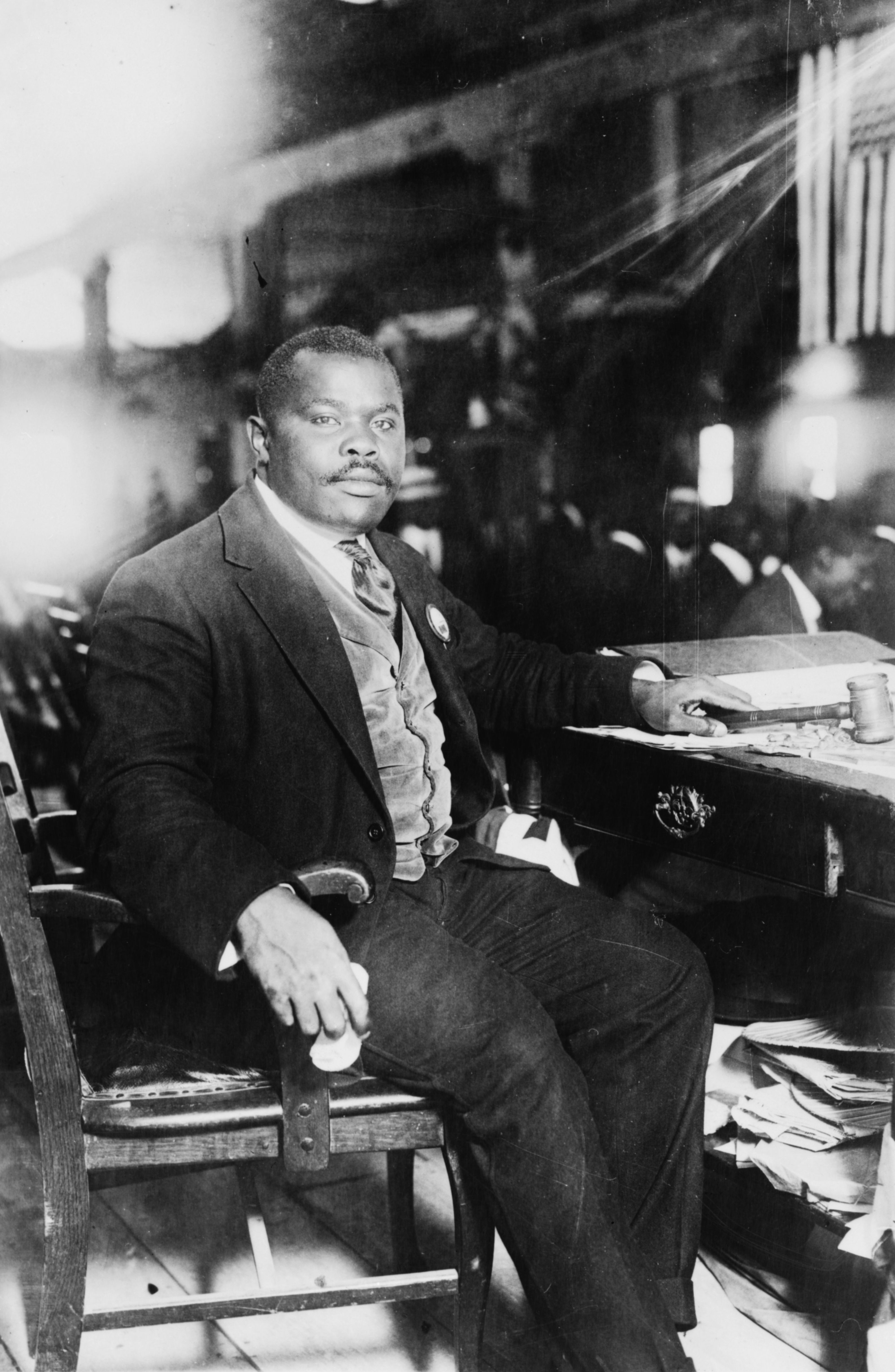
A portrait of political activist Marcus Garvey in 1924 who urged African-Americans to redirect their dollars to those with inclusive business practices

The term '"double duty dollar"' was used in the US from the early 1900s through the early 1960s, to express the notion that dollars spent with businesses hiring blacks simultaneously purchased a commodity and advanced the race. Where that concept applied, retailers who excluded African-Americans as employees effectively excluded them as patrons too.

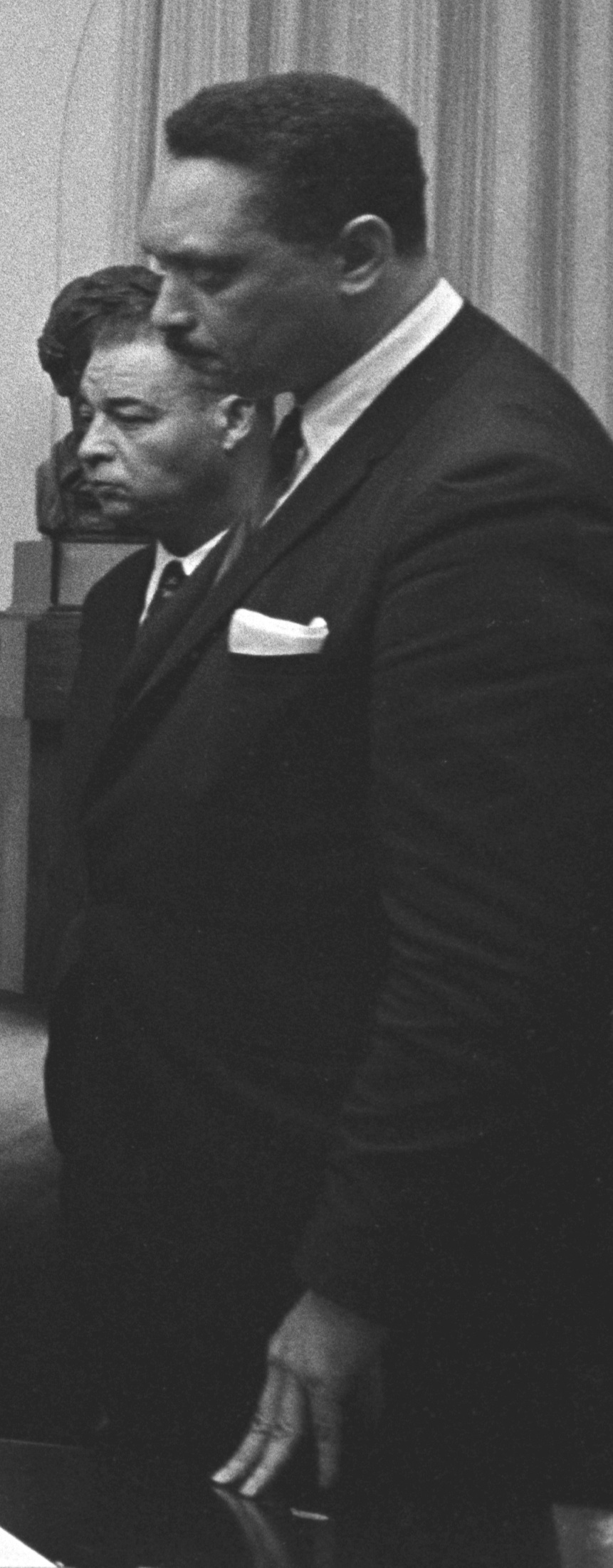
Baptist minister, civil rights leader, social activist and presidential Medal of Freedom recipient Leon Sullivan, photographed in 1968, urged African-Americans to practice "selective patronage".

Religious leaders and social activists such as Booker T. Washington and Marcus Garvey urged their communities to redirect their dollars from suppliers who excluded African-Americans to suppliers with more inclusive practices. In the 1940s and 1950s, Leon Sullivan applied the broader phrase selective patronage to note consumers' choice of suppliers as a tool a) to influence suppliers toward fairer, more just interactions with African-Americans, and b) to build demand for African-American suppliers. In retrospect, the movement had little impact.

== The national agenda ==
Minority entrepreneurship entered the national agenda in 1927 when Secretary of Commerce Herbert Hoover set up a Division of Negro Affairs to provide advice, and disseminate information to both white and black businessman on how to reach the black consumer. Entrepreneurship was not on the New Deal agenda after 1933. However, when Washington turned to war preparation in 1940, the Division of Negro Affairs tried to help black business secure defense contracts. Black businesses were not oriented toward manufacturing in the first place, and generally were too small to secure any major contracts. President Eisenhower disbanded the agency in 1953. With the civil rights movement at full blast, Lyndon Johnson coupled black entrepreneurship with his war on poverty, setting up special program in the Small Business Administration, the Office of Economic Opportunity, and other agencies. This time there was money for loans designed to boost minority business ownership. Richard Nixon greatly expanded the program, setting up the Office of Minority Business Enterprise (OMBE) in the expectation that black entrepreneurs would help defuse racial tensions and possibly support his reelection .

== The national market ==
Most national corporations before the 1960s ignored the black market, and paid little attention to working with black merchants or hiring blacks for responsible positions. Pepsi-Cola was a major exception, as the number two brand fought for parity with Coca-Cola. The upstart soda brand hired Edward F. Boyd (1914–2007), a pioneer black advertiser. Boyd hired local black promoters who penetrated into black markets across the South and the urban North. Journalist Stephanie Capparell interviewed six men who were on the team in the late 1940s:

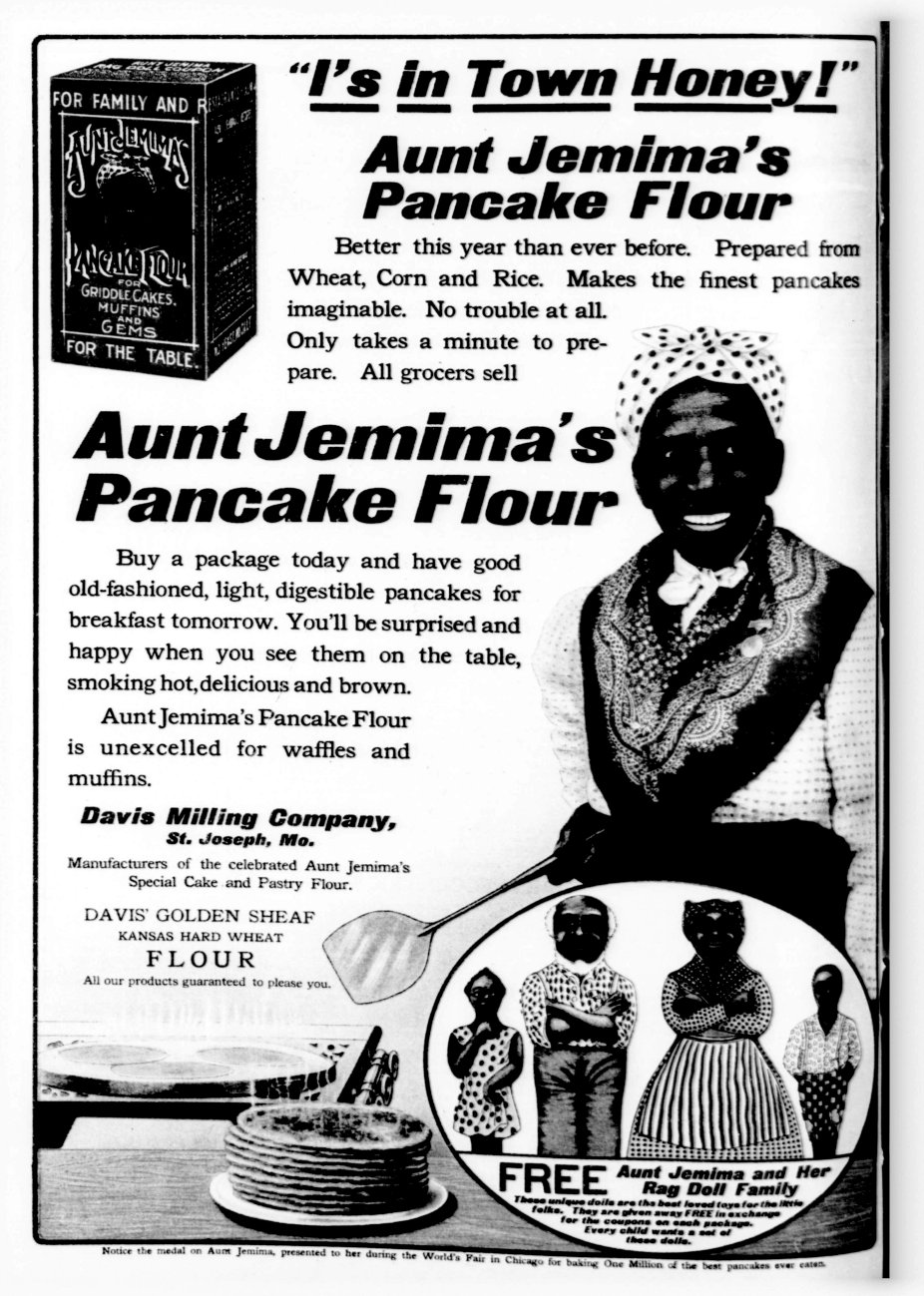
Quaker Oats 1909 newspaper ad directed at white consumers

The team members had a grueling schedule, working seven days a week, morning and night, for weeks on end. They visited bottlers, churches, "ladies groups," schools, college campuses, YMCAs, community centers, insurance conventions, teacher and doctor conferences, and various civic organizations. They got famous jazzmen such as Duke Ellington and Lionel Hampton to give shout-outs for Pepsi from the stage. No group was too small or too large to target for a promotion.

Pepsi advertisements avoided the stereotypical images common in the major media that depicted one-dimensional Aunt Jemimas and Uncle Bens whose role was to draw a smile from white customers. Instead it portrayed black customers as self-confident middle-class citizens who showed very good taste in their soft drinks. They were economical too, as Pepsi bottles were twice the size.

In 1968, the first black-owned McDonald's franchise opened in Chicago.

== The 21st century ==
In 2002, African-American-owned businesses accounted for 1.2 million of the United States' 23 million businesses. As of 2011 African-American-owned businesses account for approximately 2 million US businesses. Black-owned businesses experienced the largest growth in number of businesses among minorities from 2002 to 2011. The internet enabled black-owned businesses such as McBride Sisters Wine Company to become visible and reach a larger market than would have been possible pre-internet.

The Dodd–Frank Wall Street Reform and Consumer Protection Act of 2010 had as one goal to assist black-owned businesses land more federal contracts. It required federal agencies to open an Office of Minority and Women Inclusion (OMWI) to track their diversity efforts in workforce hiring and procurement.

Additionally African-American businessmen became more visible including billionaire BET founder Robert L. Johnson and private equity manager Robert F. Smith.

There were 2.6 million black or African American-owned firms nationally in 2012, up from 1.9 million or 34.5 percent from 2007. Many apps and online directories, such as The Nile List or Official Black Wallstreet, have emerged offering a database of African American owned businesses that consumers can support.

— The U.S. Census

In 2015 The US Census Reported that there were 2.6 million black or African-American-owned firms nationally in 2012, up from 1.9 million or 34.5 percent from 2007. Many apps and online directories, such as The Nile List or Official Black Wallstreet, have emerged offering a database of African-American-owned businesses that consumers can support.

Black entrepreneurs originally based in music and sports diversified to build "brand" names that made for success in the advertising and media worlds. The most prominent examples include media mogul Oprah Winfrey who became involved in numerous enterprises. Basketball superstar Magic Johnson was named by Ebony magazine as one of America's most influential black businessmen in 2009, Johnson has numerous business interests, and was a part-owner of the Lakers for several years. Johnson also is part of a group of investors that purchased the Los Angeles Dodgers in 2012 and the Los Angeles Sparks in 2014.

During the 21st century there have been multiple mediums for African-American-owned businesses to gain the public eye. Shark Tank, has provided a medium for many black-owned businesses to acquire investors, promote their business, and share their story with the world. One of the largest black-owned companies on Shark Tank was a company called U-Lace. U-Lace was a no-tie shoe lace owned by Tim Talley out of Rochester, New York. Mark Cuban acquired a 35% equity in the company for an investment of 200k. This investment increased revenue to over $3 million.

The pandemic has been a factor in black-owned businesses and how they are performing during this time period. A research study conducted by the Federal Reserve has found that black-owned businesses have been hit harder in the pandemic than others because of their geography, limited reach to key federal aid programs, and weaker ties to banks. They found that counties with high concentrations of black-owned businesses had a high amount of COVID-19 cases, meanwhile counties with higher shares of white-owned businesses had a lower incidence of COVID-19 cases. The result of this is the direct (longer forced closure, COVID-19 symptoms) and indirect (social distancing, fewer customers) changes on the black-owned businesses. The Paycheck Protection Program, which has $670 billion in loans to help small businesses, saw less volume of their loans go through the program to high concentrated areas of black-owned businesses. The Federal Reserve found in their study that in "30 U.S. counties that contain 40% of receipts from black-owned businesses, about 15%-20% of firms received Paycheck Protection Program loans", a rate in line with the national average. However, they found that there is a significant variation across the 30 countries with lower volumes in areas such as the Bronx, New York, Wayne County, Michigan, and Detroit, Michigan. They concluded that a massive reason for this is their geography and the current situation that each of those areas faced at the time with the pandemic. Another part of the study found that the Paycheck Protection Program may have given less loans to black-owned businesses because of their weak ties to financial institutions. At the beginning of the pandemic, many large banks prioritized customers whom with they had existing relationships in an effort to manage the overwhelming demand for loans and support. The last part of the study found that black-owned businesses are less likely to have a recent borrowing relationship with a bank. The Federal Reserve concluded their study with the statement of, "To have the greatest impact, the next round of Covid-19 relief should be more targeted geographically to focus on the hardest hit areas and communities that lack critical infrastructure (hospitals, banks) to ameliorate the gaps".

During the 2020–21 United States racial unrest, spurred by messages on social media, American consumers sought out black-owned businesses to support. June saw record high Google searches for "black-owned businesses near me" and smartphone restaurant discovery apps added features for discovering black-owned restaurants. Businesses on social media lists saw significantly increased sales. Black-owned bookstores in particular had difficulty meeting demand. The black-owned Greenwood digital bank opened in 2020 to provide financial services specifically for Americans of color and encourage competition from larger banks.

There is now a large selection of public resources that are available which allow for black-owned businesses to receive help. These resources aid the businesses furthermore since black-owned companies have been hit hard during the COVID-19 disruptions. Resources that allow for these businesses to get ahead and give guidance. The Black Business Association, based out of Los Angeles, is a non-profit that goes to aid in networking and offers training. Black founders are a group that specializes in technology entrepreneurship. Black Owned Everything has the approach of allowing black businesses to spread their advertisements in the form of pictures. This company uses the popular social media app Instagram to spread its information.

== Prominent figures ==
Birth	Death	Name	Distinction	Field
1858	1927	Alonzo Herndon	Founder of Atlanta Life and Atlanta's first black millionaire	Insurance
1867	1919	Madam C.J. Walker	The first black female millionaire and "grassroots saleswoman"	Beauty
1874	1952	Charles Clinton Spaulding	President of North Carolina Mutual Life Insurance Company, America's largest black-owned business	Insurance
1906	2005	Mary T. Washington	First African-American woman to become a certified public accountant	Finance
1918	2005	John H. Johnson	Founder of the Johnson Publishing Company, one of America's most influential black-owned businesses	Publishing
1929		Berry Gordy	Founder and first owner of Motown Records, America's highest-earning black-owned business for decades	Music
1935	2021	Vernon Jordan	Former executive director of the National Urban League, Clinton administration advisor and top-tier corporate and political power broker	Civil Rights, Business, Law
1942	1993	Reginald Lewis	The first black man to build a billion-dollar company, TLC Beatrice International Holdings Inc. The richest black man in the 1980s, and listed among the 400 richest Americans in 1993	Finance
1954		Chris Gardner	Founder of the stock brokerage firm Gardner Rich & Co and Christopher Gardner International Holdings	Finance
1954		Oprah Winfrey	The first black woman billionaire in media and entertainment and a powerhouse influencer	Media and Entertainment
1957		Raymond McGuire	Considered an African-American banking pioneer, he is also notable as pioneering black art collector, one of the top African and African-American art collectors in the world	Finance
1962		Robert F. Smith	Billionaire financier and philanthropist. Founder, chairman, and CEO of private equity firm Vista Equity Partners	Finance

== Discrimination ==
Antebellum/Pre-Civil War:

Although black entrepreneurship was present during the antebellum period, it was extremely limited and miniature due the oppressive system of slavery. The legal system of slavery severely restricted the economic freedom and business opportunities of enslaved black people. The financial circumstances of black individuals, combined with their limited rights, lack of skills, and widespread illiteracy, severely hindered their ability to participate in business activities. In the antebellum period, free black individuals made up only 10% of the antebellum black population, significantly restricting opportunities for black entrepreneurship. The legal codes and the demands of slaveowners made it extremely difficult for industrious slave businesspeople to obtain freedom papers. At the same time, free black people also faced significant barriers to starting and growing businesses due to widespread racism and discriminatory laws. The extreme racism, discrimination, and lack of rights that black people experienced at the time made it seem impossible and discouraged them to be able to start and run successful businesses.

In the antebellum South, laws made it illegal for blacks to work in certain occupations, such as peddlers, hawkers, tavernkeepers, draymen, or carters, closing off economic opportunities. Moreover, increasing racial conflict and anti-Negro sentiment during the late antebellum period made it difficult for the small number of black business people, especially in the lower south, to expand their operations. In the north, societal racism also discouraged black business participation in skilled trades, limiting an avenue for black artisans to translate their craft into profitable enterprises. Due to these legal and societal constraints, prevailing historical assessments have confined analyses of pre-Civil War black business participation to "marginal enterprises, concentrated primarily in craft and service industries." Black entrepreneurs were primarily confined to initiating ventures in the service sector or manual labor fields, which typically offered low profits and restricted opportunities for expansion. Moreover, initiating businesses by slaves without the consent of their owners was prohibited, and any economic endeavors had to be carefully managed to avoid the risk of punishment or retaliation from the slave owners. Additionally, they lacked the resources that their white peers had such as family connections or inherited wealth. The unique position of free persons of color who had previously managed plantations or owned stores was shattered by wartime destruction and economic upheaval that decimated land values and stripped blacks of slave property.

Furthermore, the few black entrepreneurs who were able to succeed were purposely undocumented by white people. Moses Beech compiled a book featuring New York's wealthiest individuals, each with a net worth exceeding 100k. Despite meeting the criteria, the 21 black entrepreneurs were purposefully excluded from this list.

Reconstruction era

Post-civil war, while blacks were free they still struggled immensely to pursue entrepreneurship with the aftereffects of slavery. Black people had a lower business ownership rate due to zero inherited wealth, education, and trouble getting loans to start a company. Furthermore, the Jim Crow restrictions and redlining made it harder for black entrepreneurs to create businesses outside ghettos, prohibiting them from expanding and becoming as successful as their white peers. Additionally, white people who resented blacks did not want to see black people succeed at business so they sought ways to get rid of it. White people become extremely violent towards black people and their businesses. In 1906 in Atlanta, white people attacked black business owners and looted their companies, causing their businesses to have to be shut down. Twenty licenses for black-owned restaurants were taken away and thirty-three licenses were inspected for suspension. Lynching during the Jim Crow era started becoming a new occurrence, and people who were most likely to become victims were successful business owners and farmers. They would specifically lynch the black entrepreneurs that white people believed were business competition. In the late nineteenth and early 20th century, there were two to three lynchings a week the most common reason being economic competition.

Consumer discrimination also negatively impacted black businesses' potential for growth. Some studies provided evidence that white consumers disliked purchasing from black-owned companies. With a sizable portion of potential customers unwilling to patronize their establishments due to racism, black businessmen saw their revenue artificially limited. This further exacerbated the challenges they faced in developing sustainable ventures. In Chicago ghettos in 1938, it was discovered that while there was an equal amount of black and white businesses, black businesses acquired less than one-tenth of the money spent.

The research in the documents found that black entrepreneurs received lower returns on their skills and faced asymmetric survival rates relative to their white peers, even when accounting for factors like education and experience. Racism resulted in black businessmen having to work even harder just to achieve the same levels of success as whites.

Post-Civil Rights Era

Following the post-civil rights era, programs were initiated to support minority entrepreneurs. In 1969, these programs allocated $8.9 million to assist minority businesses, and by 1985, the funding provided was $4.3 million. However, by 1992, Conservatives started anti-affirmative action movements in which they pursued to abolish government assistance and programs for minority groups in education, business development, and hiring. The result of the conservative movement voted on the removal of business assistance programs and loan funds for minority groups. In the 1989 Supreme Court decision of the City of Richmond v. J.A. Croson, the Court struck down Richmond's minority business enterprise (MBE) set-aside program as unconstitutional under the Equal Protection Clause. They decided that affirmative action may only be used if there is document proof of under-representation, thus making it harder for black entrepreneurs to flourish. In the 1990s conservatives attempted to eliminate affirmative action programs state-wide in elections.

Additionally, the economic depression from 2000 to 2008 made it even more difficult for all businesses, and minority startups were impacted. Private sector and governmental funds to black and other minority businesses became scarce and profit for these businesses decreased immensely.

Research still shows that black people who attempt to pursue entrepreneurship face extreme difficulty even if their qualifications match their white peers. In a study in 2000, it was found that banks disregarded African-American neighborhoods if their income was high enough causing them to be forced to use lenders that were more expensive and abusive. Additionally, black people are still given lower credit ratings than white peers even if they earn more than white peers. Furthermore, research shows that black farmers are denied at four times rate than farmers at receiving loans, causing many of them to be forced to shut down their farms.

Additionally, in comparison to other minority groups or white people, black people experience more difficulty obtaining skills that white people passed down from their families and immigrants learned abroad. Additionally, today while the black population comprises 14% of the total population, they only make up 2.3% of firms. While “racism” is over and black entrepreneurs do have more freedom now than in the past, they are still behind due to the aftermath of slavery and Jim Crow.

== See also ==
- American business history
- Black conservatism
- Black capitalism
- Civil rights movement (1896–1954)
- Civil rights movement (1865–1896)
- List of Black-owned restaurants
- List of 19th-century African-American civil rights activists
- African-American history
- African-American newspapers
- Double-duty dollar
- Economy of the United States
