= American business history =

American business history is a history of business, entrepreneurship, and corporations, together with responses by consumers, critics, and government, in the United States from colonial times to the present. In broader context, it is a major part of the Economic history of the United States, but focuses on specific business enterprises.

== New England ==
The New England region's economy grew steadily over the entire colonial era, despite the lack of a staple crop that could be exported. All the provinces and many towns as well, tried to foster economic growth by subsidizing projects that improved the infrastructure, such as roads, bridges, inns and ferries. They gave bounties and subsidies or monopolies to sawmills, grist mills, iron mills, pulling mills (which treated cloth), salt works and glassworks. Most important, colonial legislatures set up a legal system that was conducive to business enterprise by resolving disputes, enforcing contracts, and protecting property rights. Hard work and entrepreneurship characterized the region, as the Puritans and Yankees endorsed the "Protestant Ethic", which enjoined men to work hard as part of their divine calling.

== Early national ==
=== Government policy ===
The federal government under President George Washington and Treasury Secretary Alexander Hamilton strongly promoted business enterprise in the 1790s. He had a vision of an industrial nation, based on the strength of urban America.

Washington himself was business-oriented, and was involved in numerous projects to develop transportation and access to Western lands.

=== Banking ===
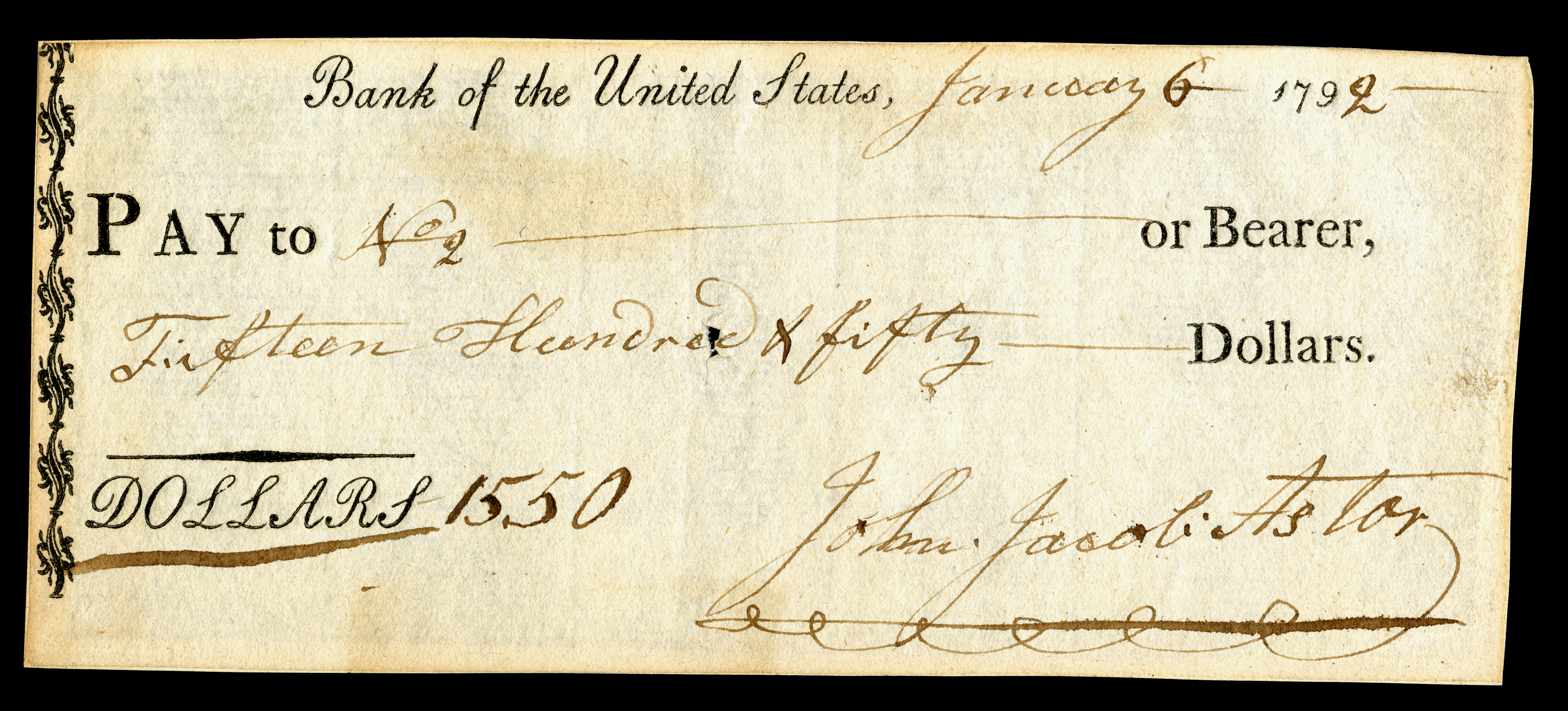
Bank of the United States check signed by John Jacob Astor in 1792

Organized banking began on a small scale after the American Revolution, with a few private banks in Boston and New York, such as the Bank of North America.

At Hamilton's initiative, and over the opposition of Thomas Jefferson, Congress set up the privately owned First Bank of the United States (BUS) to provide a uniform financial system for the 13 states.

The BUS handled national finances, tax receipts and government expenditures, and funded the national debt. Increasingly became involved in lending to business, and especially assisting new local banks in unifying the national monetary and financial system. Jefferson supporters never stop complaining of the dangers provided by the special interests behind a private national Bank, and block the renewal of its charter in 1811. The bank closed, and the government had enormous difficulty in financing the War of 1812. President James Madison, despite his Jeffersonian heritage of anti-banking rhetoric, realized the need for a replacement, and the Second Bank of the United States was opened in 1816. It flourished, promoting a strong financial system across the country, until it was challenged and destroyed by President Andrew Jackson, Jefferson's successor, in the Bank War of 1832. During the Civil War, the Lincoln administration strongly supported banking, making it attractive for local banks to invest in federal bonds, which could then be used to set up a local national bank. The nation operated without any supervising national bank until 1913, when the Federal Reserve System was created.

=== Business centers ===
==== Boston ====
Boston remained the dominant business center in New England, and its entrepreneurs pushed west to Chicago and San Francisco. The Boston Associates were merchants who took their fortunes made in world trade, and concentrated on building factory towns near Boston, most famously Lowell. By 1845, there were 31 textile companies—located in Massachusetts, New Hampshire, and southern Maine—produced one-fifth of all cotton and wool textiles in the United States. With the capital earned through these mills, they invested in railroads, especially the Boston and Lowell. These railroads helped transport the cotton from warehouses to factories. These Boston-based investors established banks—such as the Suffolk Bank—and invested in others. In time, they controlled 40% of banking capital in Boston, 40% of all insurance capital in Massachusetts, and 30% of Massachusetts' railroads. Tens of thousands of New Englanders received employment from these investors, working in any one of the hundreds of their mills.

==== Baltimore ====
In the South, by far the major business center was Baltimore, Maryland. It had a large port to handle imports and exports, and a large hinterland that included the tobacco regions of Maryland and Virginia. It dominated the flour trade. Alexander Brown (1764–1834) arrived in 1800 and set up a linen business and his firm Alex. Brown & Sons expanded into cotton and shipping, with branches in Liverpool, England, Philadelphia, and New York. The firm Helped finance the Baltimore and Ohio Railroad to tap its own hinterland as far as Pennsylvania and Ohio. Brown was a business innovator after 1819 when cash and short credits became the norms of business relations. By concentrating his capital in small-risk ventures and acquiring ships and stock in the Second Bank of the United States he came to monopolize Baltimore's shipping trade with Liverpool by 1822. Brown next expanded into packet ships, extended his lines to Philadelphia, and began financing Baltimore importers, specializing in merchant banking from the late 1820s to his death in 1834. The emergence of a money economy and the growth of the Anglo-American cotton trade allowed him to escape Baltimore's declining position in trans-Atlantic trade. His most important innovation was the drawing up of his own bills of exchange. By 1830 his company rivaled the Bank of the United States in the American foreign exchange markets, and the transition from the "traditional" to the "modern" merchant was nearly complete. It became the nation's first investment banking.

===== Baltimore and Ohio Railroad =====
Baltimore faced economic stagnation unless it opened routes to the western states, as New York had done with the Erie Canal in 1820. In 1827, twenty-five merchants and bankers studied the best means of restoring "that portion of the Western trade which has recently been diverted from it by the introduction of steam navigation." Their answer was to build a railroad—one of the first commercial lines in the world. The Baltimore and Ohio Railroad (B&O) became the first important American railroad. Some 20,000 investors purchased $5 million in stock to import the rolling stock and build the line. It was a commercial and financial success, and invented many new managerial methods that became standard practice in railroading and modern business. The B&O became the first company to operate a locomotive built in America, with the Tom Thumb in 1829. It built the first passenger and freight station (Mount Clare in 1829) and was the first railroad that earned passenger revenues (December 1829), and published a timetable (May 23, 1830). On December 24, 1852, it became the first rail line to reach the Ohio River from the eastern seaboard. The B&O railroad was merged into CSX in 1987.

== Big business: the impact of the railroads ==
Railroads had a dramatic large-scale impact on American business in five dimensions.

=== Shipping freight and passengers ===
First they provided a highly efficient network for shipping freight and passengers across a large national market. The result was a transforming impact on most sectors of the economy including manufacturing, retail and wholesale, agriculture and finance. Supplemented with the telegraph that added rapid communications, the United States now had an integrated national market practically the size of Europe, with no internal barriers or tariffs, all supported by a common language, and financial system and a common legal system. The railroads at first supplemented, then largely replaced the previous transportation modes of turnpikes and canals, rivers and intracoastal ocean traffic. The late 19th century pipelines were added, and in the 20th century trucking and aviation.

=== Basis of the private financial system ===
Railroads financing provided the basis of the private (non-governmental) financial system. Construction of railroads was far more expensive than factories or canals. The famous Erie canal, 300 miles long in upstate New York, cost $7 million of state money, which was about what private investors spent on one short railroad in Western Massachusetts. A new steamboat on the Hudson, Mississippi, Missouri, or Ohio rivers cost about the same as one mile of track.

In 1860, the combined total of railroad stocks and bonds was $1.8 billion; 1897 it reached $10.6 billion (compared to a total national debt of $1.2 billion). Funding came from financiers throughout the Northeast, and from Europe, especially Britain. The federal government provided no cash to any other railroads. However it did provide unoccupied free land to some of the Western railroads, so they could sell it to farmers and have customers along the route. Some cash came from states, or from local governments that use money as a leverage to prevent being bypassed by the main line. Larger sound came from the southern states during the Reconstruction era, as they try to rebuild their destroyed rail system. Some states such as Maine and Texas also made land grants to local railroads; the state total was 49 million acres. The emerging American financial system was based on railroad bonds. Boston was the first center, but New York by 1860 was the dominant financial market. The British invested heavily in railroads around the world, but nowhere more so than the United States; The total came to about $3 billion by 1914. In 1914–1917, they liquidated their American assets to pay for war supplies.

=== Inventing modern management ===
The third dimension was in designing complex managerial systems that could handle far more complicated simultaneous relationships than could be dreamed of by the local factory owner who could patrol every part of his own factory in a matter of hours. Civil engineers became the senior management of railroads. The leading innovators were the Western Railroad of Massachusetts and the Baltimore and Ohio Railroad in the 1840s, the Erie in the 1850s and the Pennsylvania in the 1860s.

After a serious accident, the Western Railroad of Massachusetts put in place a system of responsibility for district managers and dispatchers keep track of all train movement. Discipline was essential—everyone had to follow the rules exactly to prevent accidents. Decision-making powers had to be distributed to ensure safety and to juggle the complexity of numerous trains running in both directions on a single track, keeping to schedules that could easily be disrupted by weather mechanical breakdowns, washouts or hitting a wandering cow. As the lines grew longer with more and more business originating at dozens of different stations, the Baltimore and Ohio set up more complex system that separated finances from daily operations. The Erie Railroad, faced with growing competition, had to make lower bids for freight movement, and had to know on a daily basis how much each train was costing them. Statistics was the weapon of choice. By the 1860s, the Pennsylvania Railroad—the largest in the world—was making further advances in using bureaucracy under John Edgar Thomson, president 1852–1874. He divided the system into several geographical divisions, which each reported daily to a general superintendent in Philadelphia. All the American railroads copied each other in the new managerial advances, and by the 1870s emerging big businesses in the industrial field likewise copied the railroad model.

=== Career paths ===
The fourth dimension was in management of the workforce, both blue-collar workers and white-collar workers. Railroading became a career in which young men entered at about age 18 to 20, and spent their entire lives usually with the same line. Young men could start working on the tracks, become a fireman, and work his way up the engineer. The mechanical world of the roundhouses have their own career tracks. A typical career path would see a young man hired at age 18 as a shop laborer, be promoted to skilled mechanic at age 24, brakemen at 25, freight conductor at 27, and passenger conductor at age 57. Women were not hired.

White-collar careers paths likewise were delineated. Educated young men started in clerical or statistical work and moved up to station agents or bureaucrats at the divisional or central headquarters. At each level they had more and more knowledge experience and human capital. They were very hard to replace, and were virtually guaranteed permanent jobs and provided with insurance and medical care. Hiring, firing and wage rates were set not by foreman, but by central administrators, in order to minimize favoritism and personality conflicts. Everything was by the book, and increasingly complex set of rules told everyone exactly what they should do it every circumstance, and exactly what their rank and pay would be. Young men who were first hired in the 1840s and 1850s retired from the same railroad 40 or 50 years later. To discourage them from leaving for another company, they were promised pensions when they retired. Indeed, the railroads invented the American pension system.

At the turn of the 20th century, the world of business began to transform from small family business to large corporations in need of management. The expanding need to fill management positions led to the creation of personnel departments. Rapid growth in the corporate sector also informed the creation of formal management programs in post-secondary education. Large corporations turned to educational institutions to find suitable employees. Noticing the market need for a more highly educated workforce, colleges and universities of the period provided business management training and partnered with local businesses to assist with the placement of graduates in corporate positions.

=== Love-hate relationship with the railroads ===
America developed a love-hate relationship with railroads. Boosters in every city worked feverishly to make sure the railroad came through, knowing their urban dreams depended upon it. The mechanical size, scope and efficiency of the railroads made a profound impression; people who dressed in their Sunday best to go down to the terminal to watch the train come in. David Nye argues that:

The startling introduction of railroads into this agricultural society provoked a discussion that soon arrived at the enthusiastic consensus that railways were sublime and that they would help to unify, dignified, expand and enrich the nation. They became part of the public celebrations of Republicanism. The rhetoric, the form, and the central figures of civic ceremonies changed to accommodate the intrusion of this technology....[Between 1828 and 1869] Americans integrated the railroad into the national economy and enfolded it within the sublime.

Travel became much easier, cheaper and more common. Shoppers from small towns could make day trips to big city stores. Hotels, resorts and tourist attractions were built to accommodate the demand. The realization that anyone could buy a ticket for a thousand-mile trip was empowering. Historians Gary Cross and Rick Szostak argue:

with the freedom to travel came a greater sense of national identity and a reduction in regional cultural diversity. Farm children could more easily acquaint themselves with the big city, and easterners could readily visit the West. It is hard to imagine a United States of continental proportions without the railroad.

The engineers became model citizens, bringing their can-do spirit and their systematic work effort to all phases of the economy as well as local and national government. By 1910, major cities were building magnificent palatial railroad stations, such as the Pennsylvania Station in New York City, and the Union Station in Washington DC.

But there was also a dark side. As early as the 1830s, novelists and poets began fretting that the railroads would destroy the rustic attractions of the American landscape. By the 1840s concerns were rising about terrible accidents when speeding trains crashed into helpless wooden carriages. By the 1870s, railroads were vilified by Western farmers who absorbed the Granger movement theme that monopolistic carriers controlled too much pricing power, and that the state legislatures had to impose maximum prices. Local merchants and shippers supported the demand and got some "Granger Laws" passed. Anti-railroad complaints were loudly repeated in late 19th century political rhetoric. The idea of establishing a strong rate fixing federal body was achieved during the Progressive Era, primarily by a coalition of shipping interests. Railroad historians mark the Hepburn Act of 1906 that gave the Interstate Commerce Commission (ICC) the power to set maximum railroad rates as a damaging blow to the long-term profitability and growth of railroads. After 1910 the lines faced an emerging trucking industry to compete with for freight, and automobiles and buses to compete for passenger service.

== Marketing ==
=== The general store ===
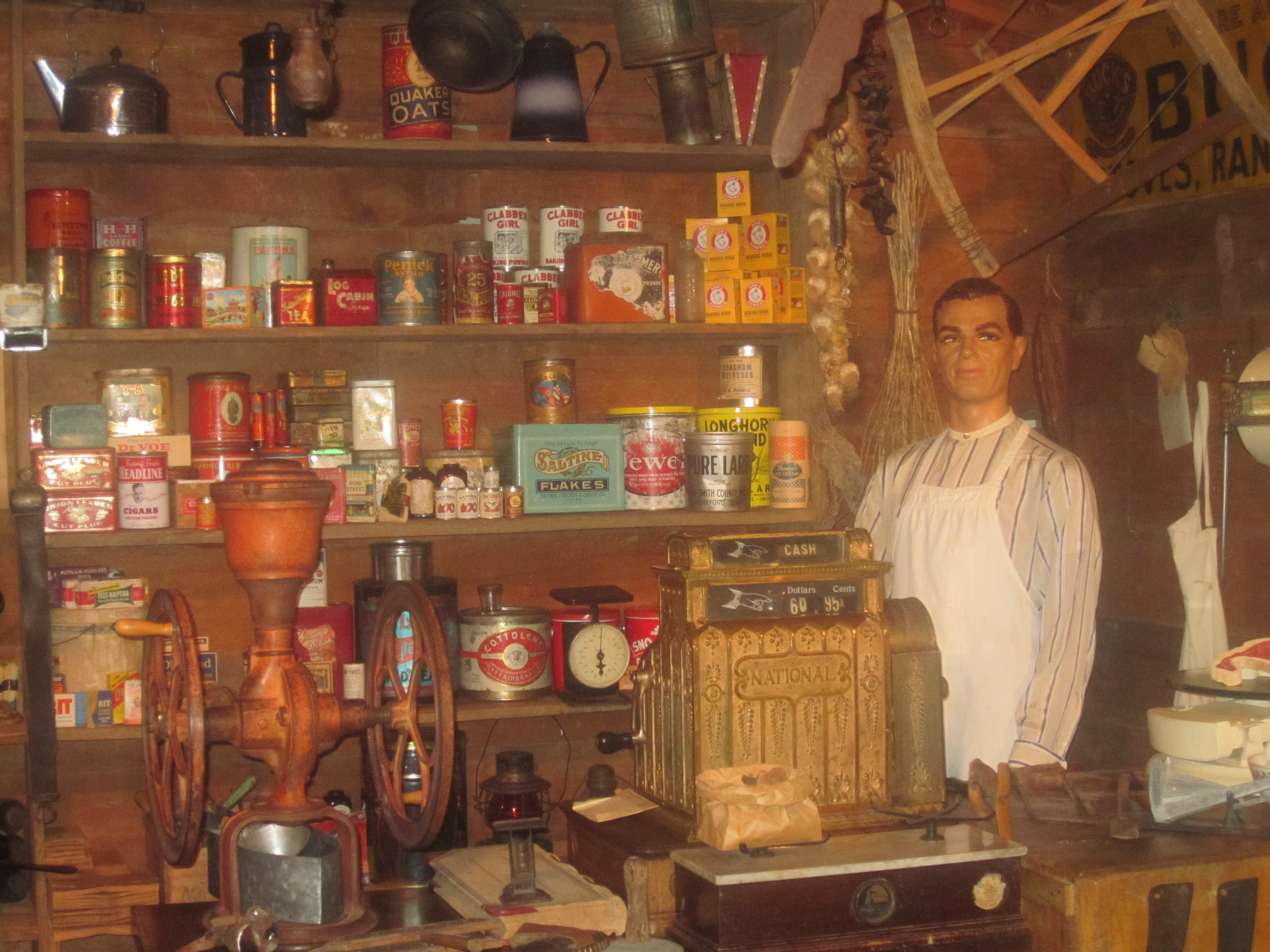
General store exhibit at the Deaf Smith County Historical Museum in Hereford, Texas

General stores, and itinerant peddlers, dominated in rural America until the coming of the automobile after 1910. Farmers and ranchers depended on general stores that had a limited stock and slow turnover; they made enough profit to stay in operation by selling at high prices. Often farmers would barter butter, cheese, eggs, vegetables or other foods which the merchant would resell. Prices were not marked on each item; instead the customer negotiated a price. Men did most of the shopping, since the main criterion was credit rather than quality of goods. Indeed, most customers shopped on credit, paying off the bill when crops, hogs or cattle were later sold; the owner's ability to judge credit worthiness was vital to his success. The store was typically a gathering point for local men to chat, pass around the weekly newspaper, and talk politics.

In the South the general store was especially important after the Civil War, as the merchant was one of the few sources of seasonal credit available until the cash crops (usually cotton or tobacco) were harvested in the fall. There were very few nearby towns, so rural general stores and itinerant peddlers were the main sources of supply.

=== Retail in towns and small cities ===
In the small cities consumers had more choices, usually purchasing dry goods and supplies at locally owned department store. Sometimes entrepreneurs opened stores in nearby cities, as did the Goldwater family in Arizona. They had a much wider selection of goods than in the country general stores and price tags that gave the actual selling price. Department stores provided limited credit, and set up attractive displays and, after 1900, window displays as well. Their clerks—usually men before the 1940s—were experienced salesmen whose knowledge of the products appealed to the better educated middle-class women who did most of the shopping. The keys to success were a large variety of high-quality brand-name merchandise, high turnover, reasonable prices, and frequent special sales. The larger stores sent their buyers to Chicago or other big wholesale centers once or twice a year to evaluate the newest trends in merchandising and stock up on the latest fashions. By the 1920s and 1930s, large mail-order houses such as Sears, Roebuck & Co. and Montgomery Ward provided serious competition. In response the local department stores came to rely even more on salesmanship as well as close integration with the community. See List of defunct department stores of the United States.

=== The big city department store ===
In every large city department stores appeared in the mid-19th century aimed at affluent women customers. They followed a model that originated in London and Paris, but all the major department stores quickly copied new features from each other. In New York City in 1862, Alexander Turney Stewart built a store on a full city block with eight floors and nineteen departments of dress goods and furnishing materials, carpets, glass and china, toys and sports equipment, ranged around a central glass-covered court. His innovations included buying from manufacturers for cash and in large quantities, keeping his markup small and prices low, truthful presentation of merchandise, the one-price policy (so there was no haggling), simple merchandise returns and cash refund policy, selling for cash and not credit, buyers who searched worldwide for quality merchandise, departmentalization, vertical and horizontal integration, volume sales, and free services for customers such as waiting rooms and free delivery of purchases. Beauty and elegance were central themes, the department stores hired attractive upscale young women to deal with the customers, while the back rooms the men made practically all the decisions.

=== Self-service ===
Until now retail stores involved customers giving orders to clerks who assembled merchandise. Self-service, whereby the customer roamed the aisles and picked out what she wanted, was innovation in the early 20th century that made possible supermarket grocery chains and other forms of chain stores. Clarence Saunders (1881-1953) launched the self-service revolution with his Piggly Wiggly store in Memphis, Tennessee in 1916. The store depended on personal shopping baskets, branded products, and checkouts at the front. A critical ingredient was the educated consumer who had familiarized herself with brand-name products and prices. By 1922, Piggly Wiggly had opened 1,200 stores in 29 states. Saunders, however, went bankrupt through speculation on Wall Street in 1923. By 1932, the chain had grown to 2,660 stores doing over $180 million annually. The stores were either owned by the firm and franchised. The success encouraged imitators, including Handy Andy stores, Helpy Selfy stores, Mick-or-Mack stores and Jitney Jungle, all of which operated under patented systems. During Great Depression, chain stores became the targets of angry local merchants, who secured the Robinson–Patman Act of 1936; it was a federal law that required all retailers to charge the same price for certain items.

=== Advertising ===
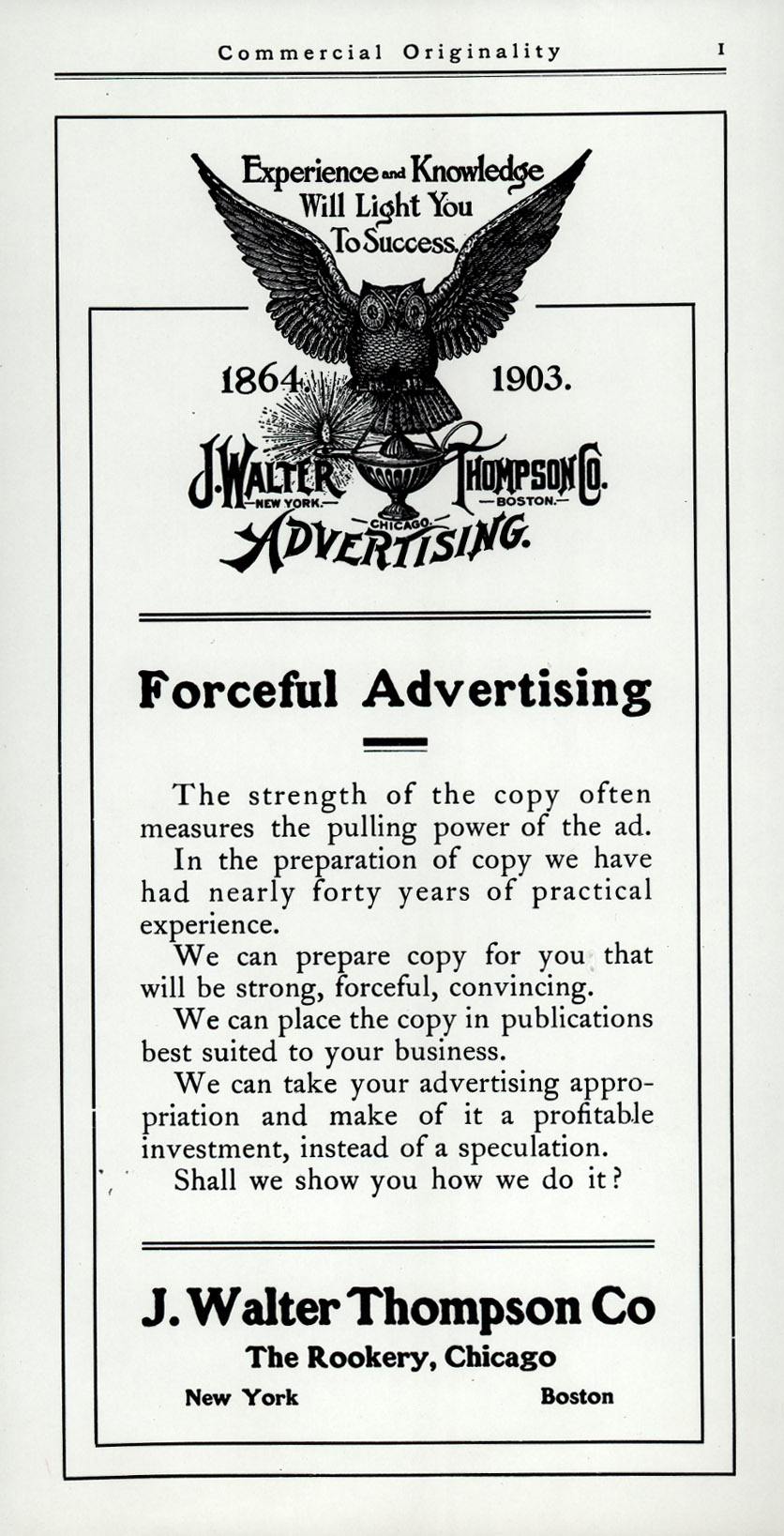
J. Walter Thompson Co. promotes high-powered advertisement, 1903

By 1900 the advertising agency had become the focal point of creative planning, and advertising was firmly established as a profession. At first, agencies were brokers for advertisement space in newspapers. N. W. Ayer & Son was the first full-service agency to assume responsibility for advertising content. N.W. Ayer opened in 1869, and was located in Philadelphia. In 1893, 104 companies spent over $50,000 each on national advertising. Most sold patent medicines, which faded away after the federal food and drug legislation of the early 20th century. Seven innovators had emerged in the big time: Quaker Oats, Armour meat, Cudahy meat, American Tobacco Company, P. Lorillard tobacco, Remington Typewriters, and Procter & Gamble soap. By 1914, two thirds of the top advertisers came from just five industries: 14 food producers, 13 in automobiles and tires, nine in soap and cosmetics, and four in tobacco. Agencies were forever breaking up and reforming, especially when one executive would split taking with him a major client and his team of copywriters.

Advertising increased dramatically in the United States after 1900 as industrialization expanded the supply of manufactured products to a very large market. In order to profit from this higher rate of production, industry needed to recruit workers as consumers of factory products. It did so through the invention of mass marketing designed to influence the population's economic behavior on a larger scale. Total advertising volume in the United States grew from about $200 million in 1880 to nearly $3 billion in 1920.

== The golden age of black entrepreneurship ==
The nadir of race relations was reached in the early 20th century, in terms of political and legal rights. Blacks were increasingly segregated. However the more they were cut off from the larger white community, the more black entrepreneurs succeeded in establishing flourishing businesses that catered to a black clientele. In urban areas, North and South, the size and income of the black population was growing, providing openings for a wide range of businesses, from barbershops to insurance companies. Undertakers had a special niche, and often played a political role.

Historian Juliet Walker calls 1900-1930 the "Golden age of black business." According to the National Negro Business League, the number black-owned businesses doubled from 20,000 1900 and 40,000 in 1914. There were 450 undertakers in 1900 and, rising to 1000. Drugstores rose from 250 to 695. Local retail merchants – most of them quite small – jumped from 10,000 to 25,000. One of the most famous entrepreneurs was Madame C.J. Walker (1867-1919); she built a national franchise business called Madame C.J. Walker Manufacturing Company based on her invention of the first successful hair straightening process.

College president Booker T. Washington (1856-1915), who ran the National Negro Business League was the most prominent promoter of black business. He moved from city to city to sign up local entrepreneurs into his national network the National Negro Business League.

Although black business flourished in urban areas, it was severely handicapped in the rural South where the great majority of blacks lived. Blacks were farmers who depended on one cash crop, typically cotton or tobacco. They chiefly traded with local white merchants. The primary reason was that the local country stores provided credit, that is the provided supplies the farm and family needed, including tools, seeds, food and clothing, on a credit basis until the bill was paid off at harvest time. Black businessmen had too little access to credit to enter this business. Indeed, there were only a small number of wealthy blacks; overwhelmingly they were real estate speculators in the fast-growing cities, such as Robert Reed Church in Memphis.

== Heavy industry ==
=== Steel ===
Numerous smaller companies when operation before the Civil War the British innovation of making inexpensive steel, which is much stronger than traditional ironwork, cause the radical transformation. Young Andrew Carnegie (1835–1919) was a key leader. He was not an engineer, but he gave experts in the mills in Pittsburgh their lead, and he moved to New York City to sell large quantities of steel for the new bridges, railways and skyscrapers.

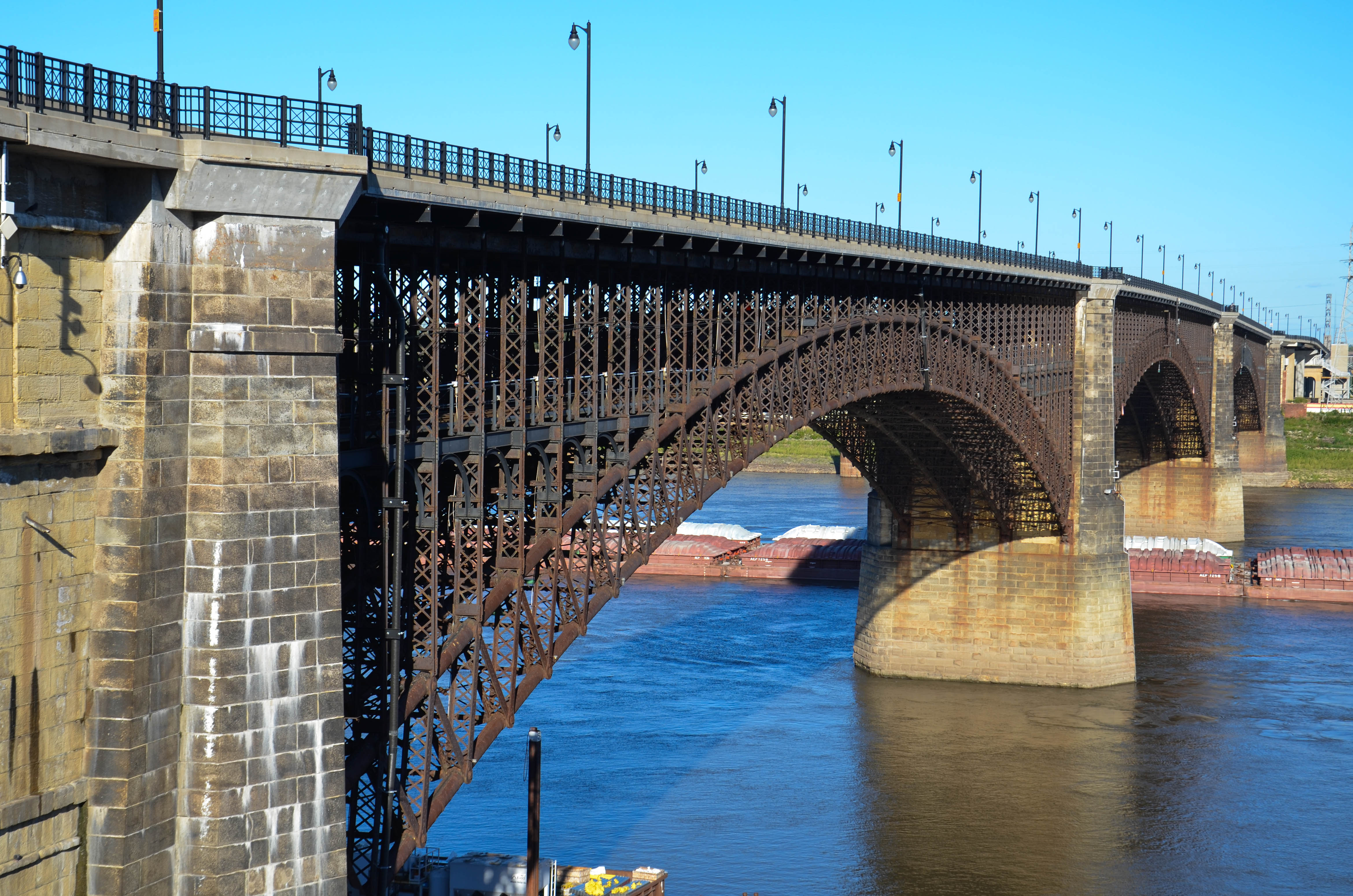
Eads Bridge across the Mississippi River at ST Louis, opened in 1874 using Carnegie steel

By 1890 Carnegie Steel was the world's largest manufacturer of pig iron, steel rails, and coke. In 1888, Carnegie bought the rival Homestead Steel Works, which included an extensive plant served by tributary coal and iron fields, a 425-mile (685 km) long railway, and a line of lake steamships. Consolidation came in 1892 through the Carnegie Steel Company. By 1889, American output of steel exceeded that of Britain, and Carnegie owned a large part of it. By 1900, the profits of Carnegie Bros. & Company alone stood at $40,000,000 with $25,000,000 being Carnegie's share. Carnegie's empire grew to include the J. Edgar Thomson Steel Works, Pittsburgh Bessemer Steel Works, the Lucy Furnaces, the Union Iron Mills, the Union Mill (Wilson, Walker & County), the Keystone Bridge Works, the Hartman Steel Works, the Frick Coke Company, and the Scotia ore mines. Carnegie, through Keystone, supplied the steel for and owned shares in the landmark Eads Bridge project across the Mississippi River in St. Louis, Missouri (completed 1874). This project was an important proof-of-concept for steel technology which marked the opening of a new steel market.

U.S. Steel was the iconic billion-dollar industrial corporation. It was formed by banker J. P. Morgan (1837-1913) and lawyer Elbert H. Gary (1846-1927) in 1901 by combining the Carnegie Steel Company with Gary's Federal Steel Company, and several smaller concerns. Carnegie permanently left industry to become a philanthropist on a global basis, and judge Gary ran the operation. In 1907, it received federal permission to buy out its largest competitor, the Tennessee Coal, Iron and Railroad Company, To end a panic on Wall Street. It escaped prosecution for monopoly by arguing it had never engaged in any illegal monopolistic practices. But it was classes, and year-by-year watched its share of the market decline has been competitors entered the steel industry to provide warships, building materials and supply railroad same consumer products. By 1902 U.S. Steel made 67 percent of all the steel produced in the United States. One hundred years later, it accounted for only 8 percent of domestic consumption.

== Politics ==
Business generally supported the Whig party before the Civil War and the Republican Party ever since.

During the Reconstruction Era (1865-1877) the business spokesmen in the North generally opposed Radical proposals. Analysis of 34 major business newspapers showed that only 12 discussed politics. Only one, Iron Age, supported radicalism. The other 11 opposed a "harsh" Reconstruction policy, favored the speedy return of the Southern States to congressional representation, opposed legislation designed to protect the Freedmen, and deplored the impeachment of President Andrew Johnson.

In the 1936 presidential election business heavily supported the Republicans, with exceptions. A study of 589 top executives and very rich stockholders in 1936 showed that only a third (207) gave $100 or more, with a median donation of $2500. The Republicans received 82% of the money. Campaign donations from businessmen to Franklin Roosevelt and the Democrats came mostly from Southerners, Jews, smaller operations, the beer and liquor industries, and top-level businessmen from New York City.

== See also ==
- African American business history
- History of advertising
- Economic history of the United States
- History of rail transport in the United States
- Marketing
- Timeline of United States railway history

== Bibliography ==
=== Surveys ===
- Blackford, Mansel G. A History of Small Business in America (ISBN 0-8057-9824-2) (1992)
- Blackford, Mansel G., and K. Austin Kerr. Business Enterprise in American History (ISBN 0395351553) (1990)
- Blaszczyk, Regina Lee, and Philip B. Scranton, eds. Major Problems in American Business History: Documents and Essays (2006) 521 pp.
- Bryant, Keith L. A History of American Business (1983) (ISBN 0133892476)
- Chamberlain, John. Enterprising Americans: A Business History of the United States (ISBN 0060107022) (1974) by popular journalist
- Cochran, Thomas Childs (1976). Business in American Life: A History. Archived from the original on October 12, 2012 – via Questia.
- Dibacco, Thomas V. Made in the U.S.A.: The History of American Business (1988) (ISBN 0060914661), popular history
- Geisst, Charles R. (2014). Encyclopedia of American Business History. Infobase Publishing. ISBN 9781438109879.
- Groner, Alex. The American heritage history of American business & industry, (ISBN 0070011567) (1972), very well illustrated
- Ingham, John N. Biographical Dictionary of American Business Leaders (4 vol. 1983); 2014pp; scholarly essays covering 1159 major business leaders excerpt v. 2
  - Ingham, John N. and Lynne Feldman.Contemporary American Business Leaders: A Biographical Dictionary (1990); another 150 leaders post-WW2
- Krooss, Herman Edward. American Business History (ISBN 0130240834) (1972)
- McCraw, Thomas K. American Business, 1920-2000: How It Worked.2000. 270 pp. ISBN 0-88295-985-9.
- Meyer, B.H. and Caroline E. MacGill. History of Transportation in the United States before 1860 (1917). pp 366–72 online; 698pp; Encyclopedic coverage; railroads by state pp 319–550.
- Perkins, Edwin J. American public finance and financial services, 1700-1815 (1994) pp 324–48. Complete text line free
- Porter, Glenn. The rise of big business, 1860-1910 (1973)(ISBN 0690703945)
- Schweikart, Larry. The Entrepreneurial Adventure: A History of Business in the United States (2000)
- Vague, Richard (2021). An Illustrated Business History of the United States. Philadelphia, PA: University of Pennsylvania Press. ISBN 9780812252897.

=== Special topics ===
- Alfino, Mark, John S. Caputo, and Robin Wynyard, eds. McDonaldization Revisited: Critical Essays on Consumer Culture (Praeger 1998).
- Bronner, Simon J. "Consumerism" in Encyclopedia of American Studies, ed. Simon J. Bronner (Johns Hopkins University Press, 2015),online
- Chandler, Alfred D., Jr. Scale and Scope: The Dynamics of Industrial Capitalism (1990)
- Chandler, Alfred D., Jr. Shaping the Industrial Century: The Remarkable Story of the Evolution of the Modern Chemical and Pharmaceutical Industries. (2005).
- Chandler, Alfred D. Jr.; Cortada, James W. (2000). A Nation Transformed by Information: How Information Has Shaped the United States from Colonial Times to the Present. Archived from the original on December 3, 2008 – via Questia.
- Chandler, Jr., Alfred D. "The Competitive Performance of U.S. Industrial Enterprises since the Second World War," Business History Review 68 (Spring 1994): 1–72.
- Chandler, Jr., Alfred D. Scale and Scope: The Dynamics of Industrial Capitalism (1990).
- Chandler, Alfred D. Jr. (1962). Strategy and Structure: Chapters in the History of the Industrial Enterprise. Archived from the original on October 18, 2009 – via Questia.
- Chandler, Jr., Alfred D. The Visible Hand: The Managerial Revolution in American Business (1977), highly influential study
- Church, Roy, and Andrew Godley. The Emergence of Modern Marketing (2003) online edition
- Cole, Arthur H. The American Wool Manufacture 2 vol (1926)
- Dicke, Thomas S. (1992). Franchising in America: The Development of a Business Method, 1840-1980. Archived from the original on November 2, 2012 – via Questia.
- Fraser, Steve. Every man a speculator: A history of Wall Street in American life. HarperCollins, 2005.
- Friedman, Walter A. Birth of a Salesman. The Transformation of Selling in America(2005)
- Geisst, Charles R. Wall Street: a history (2012).
- Glickman, Lawrence B., ed. Consumer Society in American History: A Reader (Cornell UP, 1999).
- Jones, Geoffrey., and Jonathan Zeitlin (eds.) The Oxford Handbook of Business History(2008)
- Lamoreaux, Naomi R., and Daniel M. G. Raff, eds. Coordination and Information: Historical Perspectives on the Organization of Enterprise (1995)
- Myers, Margaret G. A financial history of the United States (1970).
- Previts, Gary John, and Barbara D. Merino. History of Accountancy in the United States: The Cultural Significance of Accounting (1998).
- Tedlow, Richard S., and Geoffrey G. Jones, eds. The Rise and Fall of Mass Marketing (Routledge, 2014).
- Whitten, David O. (1983). The Emergence of Giant Enterprise, 1860-1914: American Commercial Enterprise and Extractive Industries. Archived from the original on October 18, 2009 – via Questia.
- Wilkins, Mira. The Emergence of Multinational Enterprise(1970)
- Wilkins, Mira. The Maturing of Multinational Enterprise (1974)
- Williamson, Harold F.; Daum, Arnold R. (1959). The American Petroleum Industry: The Age of Illumination, 1859-1899. Archived from the original on February 24, 2008 – via Questia. The standard history of the oil industry.

=== Historiography ===
- Decker, Stephanie, Matthias Kipping, and R. Daniel Wadhwani. "New business histories! Plurality in business history research methods." Business History (2015) 57#1 pp: 30–40.
- Friedman, Walter A., and Geoffrey Jones, eds. Business History (2014) 720pp; reprint of scholarly articles published 1934 to 2012
- Galambos, Louis (1967). American Business History. Service Center for Teachers of History. Archived from the original on October 20, 2012 – via Questia.
- Goodall, Francis, Terry Gourvish, and Steven Tolliday. International bibliography of business history (Routledge, 2013).
- Gras, N.S.B. and Henrietta M. Larson. Casebook in American Business History (1939), with short biographies, company histories and outlines of the main issues
- Gras, N. S. B. "Are You Writing a Business History?" Bulletin of the Business Historical Society 1944 18(4): 73–110. detailed guide to writing one; in JSTOR
- Hansen, Per H., “Business History: A Cultural and Narrative Approach,” Business History Review, 86 (Winter 2012), 693–717.
- John, Richard R. "Elaborations, Revisions, Dissents: Alfred D. Chander, Jr.'s, The Visible Hand after Twenty Years," Business History Review 71 (Summer 1997): 151–200.
- Kirkland, Edward C. "The Robber Barons Revisited," The American Historical Review, 66#1 (1960), pp. 68–73. in JSTOR
- Klass, Lance, and Susan Kinnell. Corporate America: A Historical Bibliography 1984
- Klein, Maury. "Coming Full Circle: the Study of Big Business since 1950." Enterprise & Society: the International Journal of Business History 2001 2(3): 425–460. ISSN 1467-2227 Fulltext: OUP
- Lamoreaux, Naomi R.; Raff, Daniel M. G.; and Temin, Peter. "Beyond Markets and Hierarchies: Toward a New Synthesis of American Business History." American Historical Review (2003) 108#2 pp: 404–433. online
- Larson, Henrietta M. "Business History: Retrospect and Prospect." Bulletin of the Business Historical Society 1947 21(6): 173–199. in Jstor
- Scranton, Philip, and Patrick Fridenson. Reimagining Business History (2013) online review
- Sharp, Kelly K. "Current trends in African American business history of the nineteenth and twentieth centuries: Recent historiography and applications of the field" History Compass vol 18, Issue 1 (January 2020) online
- Staudenmaier, John, and Pamela Walker Lurito Laird. "Advertising History" Technology and Culture (1989) 30#4 pp. 1031–1036 in JSTOR
- Tucker, Kenneth Arthur. Business History: Selected Readings (1977)

=== Entrepreneurs, industries, and enterprises ===
- Bailyn, Bernard. The New England Merchants in the Seventeenth Century (1955)
- Beckert, Sven. The monied metropolis: New York City and the consolidation of the American bourgeoisie, 1850-1896 (2003).
- Brinkley, Douglas G. Wheels for the World: Henry Ford, His Company, and a Century of Progress (2003)
- Byrne, Frank. Becoming Bourgeois: Merchant Culture in the South, 1820-1865 (2006).
- Bursk, Edward C., et al. eds. The World Of Business Harvard Business School (4 vol. 1962); 2,700 pages of business insight, memoirs, history, fiction, & analysis.
- Clark, Thomas D. Pills, Petticoats, and Plows: The Southern Country Store. (1944).
- Chernow, Ron. Titan: The Life of John D. Rockefeller, Sr. (1998)\
- Chernow, Ron. The House of Morgan: an American banking dynasty and the rise of modern finance (2001).
- Cochran, Thomas C. (1948). The Pabst Brewing Company: The History of an American Business. Archived from the original on October 18, 2009 – via Questia.
- Dethloff, Henry C., and C. Joseph Pusateri, eds. American business history: case studies (1987).
- Doerflinger, Thomas M. A Vigorous Spirit of Enterprise: Merchants and Economic Development in Revolutionary Philadelphia (1986)
- Du Bois, W.E.B. The Negro in business: report of a social study made under the direction of Atlanta University (1899) online
- Encyclopedia of American business history and biography; 500+ Pages each with coverage of entrepreneurs, corporations, and technologies, Plus specialized bibliographies
  - Bryant, Keith L., ed. Railroads in the Age of Regulation, 1900-1980 (1988)
  - Frey, Robert L., ed. Railroads in the Nineteenth Century (1988)
  - Leary, William. ed. The Airline Industry (1992)
  - May, George S., ed. The Automobile Industry, 1896-1920 (1990)
  - May, George S., ed. The Automobile Industry 1920-1980 (1989)
  - Paskoff, Paul F., ed. Iron and Steel in the Nineteenth Century (1989)
  - Schweikart, Larry, ed. Banking and Finance, 1913-1989 (1990)
  - Schweikart, Larry, ed. Banking and Finance to 1913 (1990)
  - Seely, Bruce E. The Iron and Steel Industry in the 20th Century (1994)
- Folsom, Burt, et al. The Myth of the Robber Barons (2010)
- Friedman, Walter A. and Tedlow, Richard S. "Statistical Portraits of American Business Elites: a Review Essay." Business History 2003 45(4): 89-113.
- Geisst, Charles R. Monopolies in America: Empire builders and their enemies from Jay Gould to Bill Gates (2000).
- Ingham, John N. Biographical Dictionary of American Business Leaders (4 vol. 1983); 2014pp; scholarly essays covering 1159 major business leaders excerpt v. 2
  - Ingham, John N. and Lynne Feldman.Contemporary American Business Leaders: A Biographical Dictionary (1990); another 150 leaders post-WW2
- Isaacson, Walter. Steve Jobs (2011) on APPLE.
- Levinson, Marc. The Great A&P and the Struggle for Small Business in America (2011).
- Martin, Albro. James J. Hill and the Opening of the Northwest (1976)
- Morris, Charles R. The Tycoons: How Andrew Carnegie, John D. Rockefeller, Jay Gould, and J. P. Morgan Invented the American Supereconomy (2005)
- Pak, Susie J. Gentlemen Bankers. The World of J.P. Morgan (2013)
- Scranton, Philip. Proprietary Capitalism: The Textile Manufacture at Philadelphia, 1800–1885 (1983)
- Stiles, T. J. The first tycoon: The epic life of Cornelius Vanderbilt (2009); Pulitzer Prize
- Tucker, Barbara M. Samuel Slater and the Origins of the American Textile Industry, 1790–1860 (1984)
- Walker, Juliet E. K. (1999). Encyclopedia of African American Business History. Greenwood Press. Archived from the original on October 20, 2012 – via Questia.
- Wall, Joseph F. Andrew Carnegie (1970).
- Wallace, James and Jim Erickson. Hard Drive: Bill Gates and the Making of the Microsoft Empire (1993)
- Weare, Walter B. (1993). Black Business in the New South: A Social History of the North Carolina Mutual Life Insurance Company. Archived from the original on October 18, 2009 – via Questia.
