= Edward F. Boyd =

American businessman

- Born: June 27, 1914; Riverside, California, U.S.
- Died: April 30, 2007 (aged 92)
- Occupation: Business executive

Edward Francis Boyd (June 27, 1914 – April 30, 2007) was an American business executive who was responsible for the marketing of products specifically to African Americans in an era when racial discrimination was rampant and blacks had either been ridiculed or systematically ignored in advertising. His efforts for Pepsi-Cola pioneered the concept of niche marketing and allowed Pepsi to substantially increase its market share in the black community at the expense of Coca-Cola. Boyd was a leader in the African-American business community.

== Early life ==
Boyd, an African American himself, was born and grew up in Riverside, California. After high school, he trained at a local opera company and wanted to be a diplomat. After graduating from the University of California, Los Angeles in 1938, he enjoyed a short film career, playing minor roles, often as stereotypical singing and dancing roles which he resented. During his time in Hollywood, he escorted Hattie McDaniel to the 1939 Academy Awards ceremony when she became the first African American performer to win the prestigious award. He later worked for the Screen Actors Guild, was the first African American to work for the Civil Service Commission in San Francisco, and then worked as a housing specialist for the National Urban League.

== Career at Pepsi ==
Boyd's advertisement for Pepsi. The young boy is Ron Brown.

When Boyd joined Pepsi in 1947, most U.S. businesses either ignored the African American market or depicted them using ethnic stereotypes such as the "Mammy archetype". But Walter S. Mack, president of Pepsi at the time, saw the potential of a vast untapped market. In fact, he had previously established an all-black sales team in 1940, but had to drop it due to the onset of World War II.

Boyd's idea, revolutionary at the time, was to create advertisements that showed black Americans as normal, middle-class people. One such ad featured a smiling mother holding a six-pack of Pepsi while her son (a young Ron Brown, who grew up to be Secretary of Commerce) reaches up for one. Another ad campaign, titled "Leaders in Their Fields", profiled twenty prominent African Americans such as Nobel Peace Prize winner Ralph Bunche.

Boyd also led a sales team composed entirely of African Americans around the country to promote Pepsi. Racial segregation and Jim Crow laws were still in place throughout much of the U.S. and Boyd's team encountered a great deal of discrimination. Not only did they have to ride on segregated trains and stay in black-only hotels, but they faced insults from Pepsi co-workers and even endured threats from the Ku Klux Klan. On the other hand, they were able to use racism as a selling point, attacking Coke's reluctance to hire blacks and the support of segregationist Governor of Georgia Herman Talmadge by the chairman of Coke. As a result, Pepsi's market share (as compared to Coke's) shot up dramatically. After the sales team visited Chicago, Pepsi's share in the city overtook that of Coke for the first time.

This focus on the African American market caused some consternation within the company and among its affiliates. They did not want to seem focused on black customers for fear that whites would be pushed away. In a meeting at the Waldorf-Astoria Hotel, Pepsico president Mack, who favored progressive causes and was the impetus for this marketing push, tried to assuage the 500 bottlers in attendance by saying, "We don't want it to become known as the nigger drink." At the utterance of those words Boyd, who was in attendance at this meeting, walked out of the auditorium, shocked and dismayed by Mack's statement. Mack later apologized and expressed his repentance and Boyd understood that those were not his sentiments. "I didn't forget it, but I didn't hold it against him either," he told The Wall Street Journal. After Mack left the company in 1950, support for the black sales team faded and Boyd was let go.

The Wall Street Journal writer Stephanie Capparell argues in her book The Real Pepsi Challenge that Boyd faced a more difficult challenge than Jackie Robinson in breaking the color barrier of corporate America. By doing the same work and competing for the same jobs as white people, Boyd's team presented more of a threat to the average white man.

== Later life ==
There were few opportunities for a black man as a business executive at that time, but Boyd's career continued over a variety of public and private sector jobs. He was a mission chief for CARE, worked with the Society of Ethical Culture, and helped to pioneer alpaca farming in the U.S.

Boyd's sister, Helen Boyd Howard, was married to Dr. T.R.M. Howard, a surgeon, entrepreneur, and civil rights leader in Mississippi who was a mentor to Medgar Evers and Fannie Lou Hamer. Boyd died in Los Angeles due to various complications including a stroke he had suffered nearly two months earlier.

== See also ==
- African-American businesses
