= Solvent Savings Bank and Trust =

Historical black-owned bank

Solvent Savings Bank and Trust was an African American-owned bank in Memphis, Tennessee, founded in 1906 by Robert Reed Church. It was the first African American-owned bank to achieve $1 million in assets. It merged with Fraternal Savings Bank and Trust in 1927, which failed in 1929.

== History ==
Robert Reed Church founded Solvent Savings Bank and Trust in 1906 and was inspired to open the bank by Booker T. Washington's National Negro Business League. Church was the bank's president. M. L. Clay helped found the bank, and served as its vice president. Other officers included: Josiah T. Settle, Bert Roddy, T. H. Hayes, and J. W. Sanford. Church's son, Robert Church Jr. succeeded his father as president after his father resigned in 1912.

Solvent Savings Bank and Trust merged with Fraternal Savings Bank and Trust in October 1927. They merged because they were in debt having invested heavily in various business endeavors. The bank's cash reserves were depleted two months later when customers withdrew monies for Christmas. There was then a run on the bank, which caused it to become bankrupt and close, and 28,000 depositors to lose 90% of their savings. Bank president Alfred F. Ward was arrested after an at least $500,000 shortage was identified by bank examiners in 1928. Five officers were also involved.

== See also ==
- Freedman's Savings Bank
