= Lincoln League =

The Lincoln League was the name taken by a number of Republican Party-affiliated clubs in the United States, named for President Abraham Lincoln. Among the most famous of the leagues was one organized in 1916 by Robert Church Jr. in Memphis, Tennessee.

== Tennessee Lincoln League ==
The Tennessee Lincoln League was established by Robert Church Jr. in 1916 and advocated for African American interests in the Republican Party. Church recruited various business leaders to join the group including T. H. Hayes, J. B. Martin, Levoy McCoy, Bert M. Roddy, and J. T. Settle. The Lincoln League worked to secure patronage (government jobs doled out by party leaders) and advocated for policies against lynching, fire protection, police services, parks, and schools. The group also raised money to pay poll taxes so African Americans could vote and supported voter education at night schools, promoted candidates, and held fundraisers. The group leveraged African American voters and solidarity to deliver political involvement, influence, and government funding to benefit the African American community. The group also advocated for representation, rights, safety, and recognition for African Americans in the Republican Party.

Organized in Memphis, the group held meetings in Church Park Auditorium on Beale Street, an African American-owned venue. The group's success expanded to various cities and towns in Tennessee as well as to cities in other states. The Lincoln League took to the national stage with the development of the Lincoln League of America and a national meeting was held in Chicago in February, 1920. According to the Tennessee Encyclopedia, the Lincoln League contributed to later Civil Rights movements by promoting African American racial solidarity.
