= Robert Church Jr. =

American civil rights activist (1885–1952)

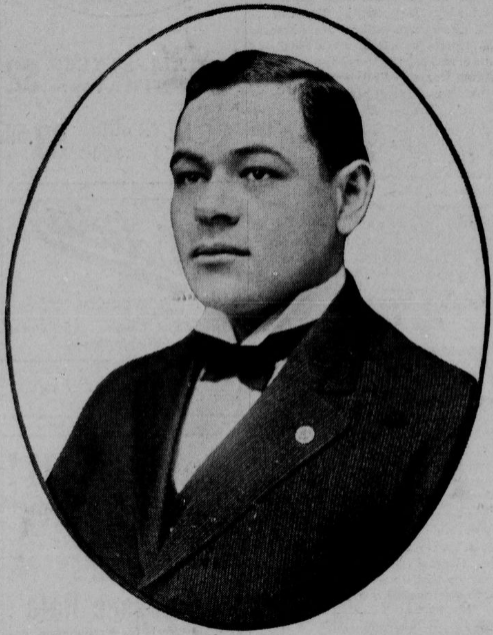
- Born: Robert Reed Church Jr. October 26, 1885; Memphis, Tennessee, U.S.
- Died: April 17, 1952 (aged 66); Memphis, Tennessee, U.S.
- Education: Morgan Park Military Academy
- Political party: Republican
- Spouse: Sara P. Johnson (m. 1911)
- Children: Sara Roberta Church
- Parent(s): Robert Church Sr. Anna Wright
- Relatives: Mary Church Terrell (half-sister)

Robert Reed Church Jr. (October 26, 1885 – April 17, 1952) was a prominent businessman and Republican Party organizer in Memphis, Tennessee. His father was the successful businessman Robert Reed Church, and Church Jr. succeeded his father as president of the Solvent Savings Bank and Trust Company after his father's death. An African American, he organized the first NAACP branch in Tennessee and was a member of the NAACP national board of directors. From the 1910s to 1940s, he was one of the most powerful political figures in his hometown of Memphis. Forced to leave Memphis because of harassment by Democratic boss E. H. Crump, Church moved to Washington, D.C., in 1940.

== Personal life ==
Church was born on October 26, 1885, to Robert Reed Church and Anna Susan Wright. He had one sister, Annette Elaine. Mary Church Terrell, the well-known civil rights activist and suffragist, was his half-sister, born from his father's first marriage to Louisa Ayres. Church was educated at parochial schools in Memphis and by private tutors. He later attended Morgan Park Military Academy in Morgan Park, Illinois, and at the Berlin and Parkard School of Business in New York. After schooling, he worked for two years on Wall Street.

Church married Sara P. Johnson of Washington, D.C., in DC on July 26, 1911. They had one child, daughter Sara Roberta Church. Church died of a heart attack on April 17, 1952.

== Career ==
Church's career in Memphis began as a cashier at his father's Solvent Savings Bank and Trust Company. When his father died in 1912, he succeeded him as president. He later resigned to manage extensive real-estate holdings.

In 1916, Church founded the Lincoln League in Memphis to organize African-American political power inside the Republican Party. He helped organize voter registration drives and voting schools, and paying for poll taxes. The League sponsored a ticket in the 1916 election in Memphis, losing at the ballot box but establishing the importance of the group. Church's national political reputation also grew. Church was a delegate to the Republican National Convention eight times, starting in 1912. In 1917, Church organized a Memphis branch of the NAACP, the first branch in Tennessee. Church became a member of the national board of directors of the organization in 1919, representing fourteen southern states.

At the peak of his career, Church was known as the "Colossus of Beale Street". He assisted in directing presidential campaigns for Republican party candidates in 1920, 1924, 1928, and 1936. As his activities were central in the Republican vote in Tennessee, he became an important figure in patronage appointments in West Tennessee during the presidential administrations of Warren G. Harding, Calvin Coolidge, and Herbert Hoover. Church was credited with putting Harry S. New into the cabinet of Calvin Coolidge as postmaster general in 1923.

By 1920, Church's power was increasingly being challenged by Memphis Democratic boss E. H. Crump. The two became leaders of opposing parties in Memphis, with Josiah T. Settle, Jr, George Klepper, and Baily Walsh being Church's chief assistants. Church also saw opposition within the Republican Party in Tennessee. For example, Church's attendance at the 1928 Republican National Convention in Chicago was strongly opposed, but he eventually was seated. Church's faction occasionally supported Democrats in Memphis politics, as the Republican Party was increasingly unable to succeed in city-wide elections. One noted example was family friend Watkins Overton, who was Memphis's mayor from 1928 to 1939. Other key allies in Western Tennessee included Perry Howard, Roscoe Simmons, Emmett Scott, John R. Hawkins, James A. Cobb, and L. K. Williams.

In 1940, Crump, who no longer regarded black Republicans as an asset and was increasingly resorting to racist demagoguery, began a campaign of retaliation against Church. He greatly reduced Church's economic and political power in Memphis by arranging for the city administration to seize Church's mansion and real-estate holdings for alleged non-payment of back taxes. Church left Memphis. He wound up in Washington, D.C., where he was employed on civil rights projects for the Republican Party. Before he left, however, he made provision for one of his proteges, J. B. Martin, the head of the Negro American (Baseball) League, to succeed him as chair of the Shelby County Republican Party (which included Memphis). Martin shared Church's dream of a multi-racial and competitive GOP in Tennessee but he too was forced to leave Memphis because of Crump's strong arm tactics including police searches of every customer who entered his drug store and a threat to put him in the workhouse.

In 1942, Church lodged a complaint with the national committee of the Republican Party but, according to his friend, Perry W. Howard, decided to drop it because the Civil Rights Section of the Department of Justice investigation showed strong interest in a prosecution. Despite overwhelming evidence against Crump, however, top officials in the department, well aware of President Roosevelt's friendly ties with Crump, did not pursue it.

In 1943, Church and Martin successfully persuaded labor leader A. Philip Randolph to visit Memphis to speak out against Crump's suppression of free speech. Crump's subordinates responded by denying Randolph speaking venues by intimidating local black leaders into withdrawing invitations and shunning him. When Randolph urged Eleanor Roosevelt, who had friendly political ties with Crump, to do something to counter Crump's "fascist" denial of free speech, she refused. Her reply on December 18, 1943, to Randolph read in full: "I referred your letter to a friend of mine when I received it and I am sorry it has not been answered before. I was advised not to do anything, as it might do more harm than good." Church persisted and in 1944 urged Roy Wilkins of the NAACP to make stronger efforts to pressure the Roosevelt Administration to take action but to no avail.

In 1944, Church accepted an invitation from Randolph to become a member of the board of directors of the National Council for a Permanent Fair Employment Practices Committee.
