= Robert Reed Church =

American businessman (1839–1912)

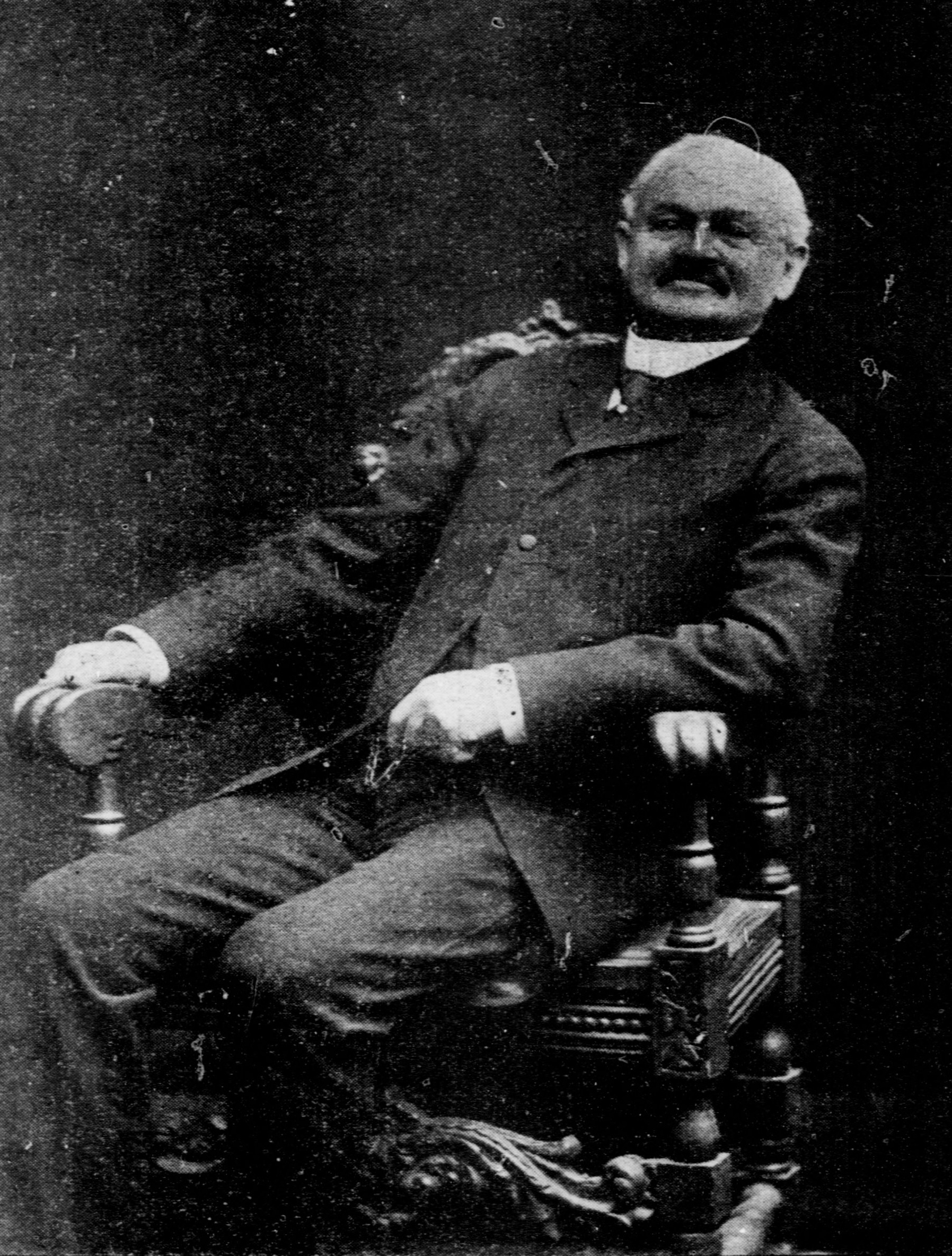
- Born: June 18, 1839; Holly Springs, Mississippi, US
- Died: August 29, 1912 (aged 73); Memphis, Tennessee, US
- Occupation: Entrepreneur
- Political party: Republican
- Spouse(s): Margaret Pico (m. 1857; was considered not legal); Louisa Ayres (divorced); Anna Wright (died)
- Children: 4 (including Mary Church Terrell and Robert Church Jr.)

Robert Reed Church Sr. (June 18, 1839 – August 29, 1912) was an American entrepreneur, businessman and landowner in Memphis, Tennessee, the first African-American millionaire in the South.

Church built great wealth and influence in the business community. He founded Solvent Savings Bank, the first black-owned bank in the Memphis, which extended credit to black Americans so they could buy homes and develop businesses. A philanthropist, Church used his wealth to develop a park, playground, auditorium and other facilities for the black community, who were excluded by state-enacted racial segregation from most such amenities in the city.

The son of a black mother and white father, Church began working as a steward when his father, a steamboat owner, took him along on his route between Memphis and New Orleans. Robert Church bought his first property in Memphis in 1862 during the American Civil War. He was well established by 1878-79, when devastating yellow fever epidemics caused dramatic depopulation in the city. With property devalued, Church bought numerous businesses as well as undeveloped land, with the long-term view of their appreciation as the city recovered. He built his great wealth on this real estate. He purchased the first $1,000 municipal bond to help the city recover from bankruptcy after it was reduced to a taxing district.

== Early life ==
Robert Reed Church was born enslaved in 1839 in Holly Springs, Mississippi, the son of Captain Charles B. Church, a white steamship owner from Virginia who operated along the Mississippi River, and Emmeline, an enslaved black American woman from Virginia. According to family accounts, Emmeline was the daughter of an enslaved "Malay" Malagasy princess and of a white planter from Lynchburg.

Emmeline died in 1851, when he was 12. His father Captain Church began taking Robert on his river journeys to and from New Orleans. The youth worked as the steward of the steamship's mess hall, picking up business acumen and contacts, including future Louisiana political leader James Lewis. In 1862, Memphis fell to Union troops and the riverboat where Church was working was seized. Church escaped, and began working in Memphis as a stableboy, salesman’s assistant, and shining shoes before saving enough to open a saloon. He eventually owned a number of businesses along Memphis's Beale street. In 1860, the black population of the city was 3,000, but it rapidly increased as fugitive slaves fled from rural plantations to Union lines in the occupied city. Church had many customers for his businesses and became influential in the developing black community, which reached 20,000 by 1865.

The dramatic demographic changes had resulted in competition among ethnic Irish, who dominated the city's police and fire departments; decommissioned black Union soldiers who had been stationed nearby, and other African Americans. The tensions in the city erupted in the Memphis Riots of 1866, when a white ethnic Irish mob attacked South Memphis, killing 45 blacks and injuring many more, and destroying houses, churches and businesses. Two whites died. Church was shot and wounded in his saloon.

== Real estate empire ==
By 1878-79, Church had acquired considerable wealth. Familiar with the high death tolls from the 1873 yellow fever epidemic, he moved his family to safety outside the city during the even worse epidemic of 1878, as well as the following year. As the city was depopulated by the flight of 25,000 people during the 1878 epidemic and death toll of more than 5,000, the land was devalued. Church saw a great opportunity in Memphis real estate and had the resources to buy up property throughout the city. He acquired commercial buildings, some residential housing, and bars in the red-light district, as well as undeveloped land. It is estimated that in later years he was able to collect about $6,000 a month in rent from his properties.

With his immense wealth, Church funded the development of high-quality facilities for black Memphians, who were excluded by the state law of racial segregation from many white institutions at the time. He developed a public park, a playground, a concert hall, and an auditorium. Church used the properties for related philanthropy: he helped sponsor graduation ceremonies, political rallies, and shows in the parks for the city's African Americans. He also hosted and funded a free annual Thanksgiving meal for the black poor. In 1906, Church, Josiah T. Settle, M. L. Clay, J. W. Sanford, and T. H. Hayes established the Solvent Savings Bank, Memphis's first black bank, and Church served as founding president. He ensured that blacks could gain access to loans for businesses and homes, to advance their lives.

== Personal life ==
Not much is known about Church's personal life. He rarely, if ever, wrote personal correspondence, and never made a public speech, despite his wide popularity and influence in Memphis.

Church married three times. His first marriage in 1857 to Margaret Pico was not considered legal, as both Church and his wife were enslaved. His second wife, Louisa Ayres, was of mixed-race, born into slavery. They both supported education for their two children, a daughter, Mary Eliza Church (1863-1954) and son, Thomas Ayres Church (1867-1937). Their daughter Mary Church Terrell was one of the first black American women to earn a college degree. She became a teacher, then a principal, as well as a civil rights activist. In 1909 she was a founding member of the National Association for the Advancement of Colored People, and in 1896 the first black woman to be appointed to the school board of a major city (Washington, DC). Church and Louisa divorced.

He then married Anna Susan Wright. They also had a son, Robert Reed Church Jr. (1885-1952) and daughter, Annette Elaine Church (1887-1975). Robert Jr. became a businessman, taking over his father's enterprises. He became politically influential, establishing the Lincoln League in 1916 to work to register black voters, fundraise to help cover poll taxes, and advocate for the interests of African Americans in the Republican Party. Within a short time, he signed up 10,000 new black voters in Memphis, and worked with E. H. Crump and his machine politics. Church junior served as an adviser to Republican presidents in the 1920s but declined any political appointments.

The senior Church generally chose to stay outside the politics of his era, which enabled him to maintain influence among both white and black Memphians. He was chosen as a delegate for William McKinley to the 1900 Republican Convention.

== Death ==
Church died August 29, 1912, after a brief illness. He is buried in Elmwood Cemetery on the south side of downtown Memphis.

== 1953 burning of the Church family home ==
In 1953, the city of Memphis hosted a demonstration of fire equipment during which the home Robert Church had built for his family in a wealthy, mixed-race neighborhood was burned to the ground. The event was an act of revenge on the part of Memphis Mayor Edward Hull "Boss" Crump for the Church family's black voter rights activism. The Tri-State Defender called the burning of the Church house "An act of infamy." In 1955 the house and the surrounding neighborhood were paved over by the city to make way for public housing complexes designated exclusively for African-Americans.

== See also ==
- Civil rights movement (1865–1896)
