= Dolce (Hannibal) =

- Hannibal episode
- Episode no.: Season 3 Episode 6
- Directed by: Vincenzo Natali
- Written by: Don Mancini; Bryan Fuller; Steve Lightfoot
- Cinematography by: James Hawkinson
- Editing by: Stephen Philipson
- Production code: 306
- Original air date: July 9, 2015
- Running time: 44 minutes

Guest appearances
- Joe Anderson as Mason Verger; Fortunato Cerlino as Rinaldo Pazzi; Giorgio Lupano as Inspector Benetti; Katharine Isabelle as Margot Verger; Glenn Fleshler as Dr. Cordell Doemling; Tao Okamoto as Chiyoh

Episode chronology
← Previous "Contorno"	Next → "Digestivo"
- Hannibal season 3

"Dolce" is the sixth episode of the third season of the psychological thriller–horror series Hannibal. It is the 32nd overall episode of the series and was written by producer Don Mancini, series creator Bryan Fuller, and executive producer Steve Lightfoot and directed by Vincenzo Natali. It was first broadcast on July 9, 2015, on NBC.

The series is based on characters and elements appearing in Thomas Harris' novels Red Dragon and Hannibal, with focus on the relationship between FBI special investigator Will Graham (Hugh Dancy) and Dr. Hannibal Lecter (Mads Mikkelsen), a forensic psychiatrist destined to become Graham's most cunning enemy. The episode revolves around the pursuit of Hannibal Lecter as Will Graham and Jack Crawford are closing on him. However, Mason Verger is also in the pursuit and his contacts make sure he is ahead of the federal investigation.

According to Nielsen Media Research, the episode was seen by an estimated 1.38 million household viewers and gained a 0.4/1 ratings share among adults aged 18–49. The episode received critical acclaim, with critics praising Natali's directing, pace, and the dinner scene although some critics felt the ending felt "anticlimactic".

== Plot ==
While Lecter (Mads Mikkelsen) flees through the streets of Florence, paramedics take Pazzi's (Fortunato Cerlino) corpse. Graham (Hugh Dancy) finally arrives at Florence, meeting with Crawford (Laurence Fishburne) to discuss Pazzi's actions. Graham confesses that a part of him wants Lecter to escape.

Lecter meets with Bedelia (Gillian Anderson), who decided that she would stay behind. She also deduces that Lecter would eat her someday, and they kiss. Chiyoh (Tao Okamoto) finds her, wanting to know Lecter's location, but she refuses to reveal it. Bedelia then uses heroin in order to maintain her new identity as Mrs. Fell and avoid incriminating Lecter when she is questioned. Back in America, Mason (Joe Anderson) is notified about Pazzi's death and, lamenting that he's lost money on a "dirty" Inspector, considers bribing another. Alana Bloom (Caroline Dhavernas) suggests that he'll need a whole department to bring in Hannibal Lecter.

Graham and Crawford arrive at Fell's house, where they question Bedelia, not believing her claim that she is Mrs. Fell as they already know her. Graham later meets Lecter at an art gallery, discussing their events and how Chiyoh threw Graham off a train. They leave the gallery together, unaware that Chiyoh is on a rooftop, aiming a rifle at them. As Graham is taking out a knife to stab Lecter, Chiyoh shoots Graham in the shoulder. Back in Baltimore, Margot (Katharine Isabelle) makes arrangements for Mason, who asks what she wants in return for her help. She responds that she wants to have children and Mason states that despite the surgery, she could still have a child with him. Margot later has sex with Bloom, who notes Mason's lead on Lecter over the FBI. Expecting Mason to go to prison, she asks Bloom if she can harvest sperm.

Crawford and Inspector Benetti (Giorgio Lupano) continue interrogating Bedelia, who still goes by Mrs. Fell. Lecter takes a wounded Graham to a hideout to remove the bullet. He then has him tied to a dining table, with Graham noting that Lecter is expecting someone else. Crawford locates Graham's location and passes Chiyoh, who walks away upon noticing Crawford's gun. Crawford finds a drugged Graham at the table but Lecter surprises him, slitting his Achilles' heel. He forces Crawford to sit, drugging him so he can't move. Lecter then takes a cranial saw and starts slicing Graham's head. Suddenly, the scene cuts to a room where Graham and Lecter find themselves hanging upside down from meathooks. Mason appears, revealing that they are in Muskrat Farm.

== Production ==
In June 2015, NBC announced that the sixth episode of the season would be titled "Dolce", with producer Don Mancini, series creator Bryan Fuller and executive producer Steve Lightfoot writing the episode and Vincenzo Natali directing. This was Fuller's 26th writing credit, Mancini's first writing credit, Lightfoot's 15th writing credit, and Natali's sixth directing credit.

== Reception ==
=== Viewers ===
The episode was watched by 1.38 million viewers, earning a 0.4/1 in the 18-49 rating demographics on the Nielson ratings scale. This means that 0.4 percent of all households with televisions watched the episode, while 1 percent of all households watching television at that time watched it. This was a 12% increase from the previous episode, which was watched by 1.23 million viewers with a 0.4/1 in the 18-49 demographics. With these ratings, Hannibal ranked third on its timeslot and twelfth for the night in the 18-49 demographics, behind Aquarius, Boom!, Rookie Blue, Mistresses, The Astronaut Wives Club, Food Fighters, Wayward Pines, Under the Dome, a Mom rerun, a The Big Bang Theory rerun, and Big Brother. With DVR factored, the episode was watched with a 0.6 on the 18-49 demo.

=== Critical reviews ===
"Dolce" received critical acclaim. Eric Goldman of IGN gave the episode an "amazing" 9 out of 10 and wrote in his verdict: "We finally got Hannibal, Will and Jack reunited in this episode and man was it a bloody mess of a time. There were some terrific scenes throughout involving all three of those characters and Bedelia, as everyone’s oh-so complicated relationships rose to the surface. And Mason has proven to be quite the notable fly in the ointment here..." Molly Eichel of The A.V. Club gave the episode an "A" and wrote, "I've enjoyed the third season of Hannibal, don't get me wrong, but it had started to languish in its own propensity for artiness. It wasn't something that had greatly bothered me until the giant jolt that was the balletic fight scene at the end of 'Contorno'. That's when it really hit: Those first four episodes were largely place-setting and the Hannibal-Jack fight was a necessary mechanism that kick-started the real action set-pieces of the season. Things are happening, movement is being made. Now we're getting somewhere. Bedelia had warned that threats to Hannibal's freedom were converging, and this episode certainly made good on that promise."

Alan Sepinwall of HitFix wrote, "I mean, any episode that can contain an exchange like the one Hannibal and Will have – 'Would you have done it quickly, or would you have stopped to gloat?' 'Does God gloat?' 'Often.' – as Hannibal is tending to Will's bullet wound, and that has Anderson enjoying herself to this degree can get away with almost anything." Mark Rozeman of Paste gave the episode a 9.8 out of 10 and wrote, "Nevertheless, this effective cliffhanger is presented merely as the cherry on top what must stand as one of the most hardcore, extreme Hannibal entries in recent memory. Granted, the Season Two finale, 'Mizumono', still holds its own, but that one was defined primarily by emotional intensity, whereas 'Dolce' puts itself forward as a quite literal manifestation of psychological warfare." Jeff Stone of IndieWire gave the episode a "B−" and wrote, "Well, that was unexpected. I'm sure the show will backtrack and show us exactly how they wound up there, because there's nothing this show likes doing more than backtracking to show some unnecessary business when it could just be getting on with things. It's always frustrating to encounter a 13-episode season that still feels padded, and this one has definitely fit the bill so far. Still, next week should have a massacre on a pig farm, so that's something to look forward to."

Brian Moylan of The Guardian wrote, "I think that Hannibal might have done it to himself, packaged himself up so that he could get close to Mason just in time to escape, and finally remove one of his opponents from the chess board. Knowing the way this show operates, we'll get all the answers of what happened when revisiting these events in the future. But for right now, this doesn't seem like dessert at all, just the beginning of something very sweet indeed." Keith Staskiewicz of Entertainment Weekly wrote, "Hannibal's third season started slowly, ethereally. There were a lot of pieces to get into place, a lot of hammers to cock, and a lot of breadcrumbs to sprinkle. But it was leading to this, when all of our players at last converged upon the same stage and, like a drunken Satanic ritual, it was inevitable that some blood would spill." Chuck Bowen of Slant Magazine wrote, "This is an unusually plot-driven episode of Hannibal that nevertheless maintains its surreal, mood-centric aura of erotic dread."

Greg Cwik of Vulture gave the episode a perfect 5 star rating out of 5 and wrote, "Throughout the entirety of 'Dolce', director Vincenzo Natali, working off of an immensely quotable script by Bryan Fuller and Don Mancini, uses his impeccable sense of mise-en-scène to keep characters pinned to certain corners of the screen, framing them through the cracks and holes and contours of furniture, architecture, other people. They're framed like butterflies in a case." Laura Akers of Den of Geek wrote, "By weaving several of the stories together this season, Fuller has instead given us many characters operating for a lot of different, often contradictory reasons. When Bedelia warns that Hannibal is drawing them in, the assumption is that he is the one who will strike and from the centre. But the truth is that Lecter has remade so many people in his image, those now surrounding him have bites almost as dangerous as his and they are just as unpredictable. Which is what we saw this week and why the next few episodes promise to be even more full of surprises." Nick McHatton of TV Fanatic gave the episode a 3 star rating out of 5 and wrote, "Everybody was trippin' in 'Dolce', and I think that the effect might have come through the TV screen. Even I feel like my head's spinning after this episode. Normally I'm completely in love with the visuals of the show, but this was one time that I felt that they were incredibly distracting. Maybe that was the point?"

Emma Dibdin of Digital Spy wrote, "'You and I have begun to blur', Will tells Hannibal, giving voice to the symbiotic bond that has only strengthened since these characters since they parted ways. Their reunion here in 'Dolce' is almost impossibly tender given the circumstances, both of them clearly so happy to see each other and to have this brief moment of peace together in front of the Botticelli. But the respite is short-lived, and the warmth overshadowed by mutual sadness. These are two people who absolutely love each other, and absolutely must destroy each other." Adam Lehrer of Forbes wrote, "So many amazing twists and turns in this episode, once again directed by the great Vincenzo Natali. Natali's work often explores the shattering, merging, and splicing of entities. We see that all over this episode. Hannibal and Will are trying to separate only to be forced back together, as conjoined as ever in Mason’s dungeon. Bedelia separates from Will and has emerged a new creature, cunning and composed. Alana and Margot are coming together, and are discussing having a baby? Natali is fascinated by the sick co-dependency of relationships on this show, and it is a pleasure to watch these people come together and then fall apart." Britt Hayes of ScreenCrush wrote, "If this season of Hannibal has fully given in to avant garde proclivities, then this week's 'Dolce' is the height of Bryan Fuller and director Vincenzo Natali's madness, offering the most sweetly intense and deliciously WTF episode to date — both visually and narratively speaking."
