= Aperitivo (Hannibal) =

- Hannibal episode
- Episode no.: Season 3 Episode 4
- Directed by: Marc Jobst
- Written by: Nick Antosca; Bryan Fuller; Steve Lightfoot
- Cinematography by: James Hawkinson
- Editing by: Stephen Philipson
- Production code: 304
- Original air date: June 25, 2015
- Running time: 44 minutes

Guest appearances
- Joe Anderson as Mason Verger; Gina Torres as Phyllis "Bella" Crawford; Raúl Esparza as Dr. Frederick Chilton; Katharine Isabelle as Margot Verger; Glenn Fleshler as Dr. Cordell Doemling; Kacey Rohl as Abigail Hobbs; Dwight Ireland as Doctor

Episode chronology
← Previous "Secondo"	Next → "Contorno"
- Hannibal season 3

"Aperitivo" is the fourth episode of the third season of the psychological thriller–horror series Hannibal. It is the 30th overall episode of the series and was written by co-producer Nick Antosca, series creator Bryan Fuller, and executive producer Steve Lightfoot and directed by Marc Jobst. It was first broadcast on June 25, 2015, on NBC.

The series is based on characters and elements appearing in Thomas Harris' novels Red Dragon and Hannibal, with focus on the relationship between FBI special investigator Will Graham (Hugh Dancy) and Dr. Hannibal Lecter (Mads Mikkelsen), a forensic psychiatrist destined to become Graham's most cunning enemy. The episode revolves around the events after the massacre at Lecter's house and reveals the fate of what happened to Will Graham, Jack Crawford and Alana Bloom.

According to Nielsen Media Research, the episode was seen by an estimated 1.46 million household viewers and gained a 0.4/1 ratings share among adults aged 18–49. The episode received critical acclaim, with critics praising answers to unanswered questions, performances, character development and build-up to the coming episodes.

== Plot ==
After being shot in the face, Dr. Frederick Chilton (Raúl Esparza) is revealed to still be alive. He visits a bed-ridden Mason Verger (Joe Anderson), who wants to see his wounds before revealing his. Chilton then shows that he is forced to use contact lenses after losing his left eye. He also lost the upper teeth on the left side of his face, and is using makeup and prosthetics to hide his disfigured face. After Mason shows his disfigured face, he tells Chilton that he is putting a $1 million bounty worldwide for any information on Lecter's (Mads Mikkelsen) whereabouts.

Chilton visits Graham (Hugh Dancy) at the hospital, and is initially mistaken for Abigail by Graham. He wants him to pursue Lecter but Graham feels dubious. When he recovers and returns home, Crawford (Laurence Fishburne) visits Graham to question him about the night at Lecter's house. Graham says he warned Lecter before Crawford arrived, not only because he considered him a friend, but because he planned to run away with him. Chilton visits Bloom (Caroline Dhavernas), who is bed-ridden and recovering from her fall at the hospital.

Bloom leaves the hospital and goes to Lecter's house, finding Graham already there. Bloom wants to question him about Lecter but Graham asks her to leave, and Graham is shown to be imagining Abigail (Kacey Rohl) next to him. Bloom starts her new job: as Mason's therapist. She meets Margot (Katharine Isabelle), who warns her about her brother's behavior and personality. Crawford is approached by Chilton about pursuing Lecter, but Crawford is busy caring for his wife Bella (Gina Torres), whose cancer has worsened and is dying. At her funeral, Crawford finds a letter from Lecter offering his condolences, upsetting him.

After the funeral, Crawford opens up to Graham, feeling he does not have to die even when he knows what will happen. At Mason's estate, he is tended by his physician, Dr. Cordell Doemling (Glenn Fleshler). He asks Cordell to prepare the pig pen, as he plans to have Lecter eaten alive by his pigs. Bloom tells Mason that she is aware of his intentions and actually helps him find Lecter. She later meets with Crawford, both planning to pursue Lecter. She mentions that Graham has already left and the episode ends with Graham travelling by boat, starting the events of his journey through Italy.

== Production ==
=== Development ===
In June 2015, NBC announced that the fourth episode of the season would be titled "Aperitivo", with co-producer Nick Antosca, series creator Bryan Fuller and executive producer Steve Lightfoot writing the episode and Marc Jobst directing. This was Fuller's 24th writing credit, Burnett's first writing credit, Lightfoot's 13th writing credit, and Natali's fifth directing credit.

=== Writing ===
According to Fuller, while the second and third episode of the season would reveal more about the fate of the characters after the second season finale, the fourth episode would "fill in" all the events between the second and third season.

=== Casting ===
The second season episode, "Yakimono", had Frederick Chilton shot in the face and no explanation of what happened later or his character's fate. At the 2014 San Diego Comic-Con, Fuller confirmed that Raúl Esparza would return as Chilton in the season, confirming his character's survival. In February 2015, Gina Torres confirmed she would return as Bella Crawford.

At the 2014 San Diego Comic-Con, Fuller confirmed that Dr. Cordell Doemling would make his debut in the episode. In January 2015, Glenn Fleshler was announced to play Cordell, "the personal doctor to a disfigured Mason Verger, quiet, very intelligent, and definitely creepy." In December 2014, it was announced that Michael Pitt chose not to return to play Mason Verger, being replaced by Joe Anderson.

== Reception ==
=== Viewers ===
The episode was watched by 1.46 million viewers, earning a 0.4/1 in the 18-49 rating demographics on the Nielson ratings scale. This means that 0.4 percent of all households with televisions watched the episode, while 1 percent of all households watching television at that time watched it. This was a 14% decrease from the previous episode, which was watched by 1.69 million viewers with a 0.5/2 in the 18-49 demographics. With these ratings, Hannibal ranked third on its timeslot and tenth for the night in the 18-49 demographics, behind Aquarius, Rookie Blue, Mistresses, The Astronaut Wives Club, Boom!, Wayward Pines, Under the Dome, Dateline NBC, and Big Brother.

With DVR factored, the episode was watched by 2.01 million viewers with a 0.6 on the 18-49 demo.

=== Critical reviews ===
"Aperitivo" received critical acclaim. Eric Goldman of IGN gave the episode an "amazing" 9 out of 10 and wrote in his verdict: "The very end of the episode was a bit odd, as Will got into that boat. Obviously, this is still quite some time before the current events on the show, but it almost made it seem like he was going to take that little boat to Europe to find Hannibal. That aside, this was a really cool, layered episode that gave us our biggest information dump yet this season in a compelling, nuanced manner. Oh, and we met yet another well-crafted, creepy character, in the form of Mason's physical therapist, Cordell – a guy who doesn't blink at his boss calmly telling him to make arrangements to have another man eaten alive. Welcome, Cordell!"

Molly Eichel of The A.V. Club gave the episode a "B+" and wrote, "Perhaps the boldest move this show that is made up entirely of bold moves has made is make an episode without its title character. Hannibal has been on the outskirts before, giving up the spotlight to lesser characters but 'Aperitivo' does not just take Hannibal out of the mix. It completely gives itself away to those characters that fell victim to both Hannibal (and Will) last season. The first three episodes, for the most part, willfully refused to reveal how these people were doing, or if they were still alive (minus Jack's trip to Italy). In 'Aperitivo', it's all laid bare. The episode certainly works but it is one of exposition, playing catch up due to this season's nontraditional structure."

Alan Sepinwall of HitFix wrote, "'Aperitive' isn't exactly the show doing a stylistic 180 and resembling an episode of NCIS. It bounces back and forth in time, it plays with characters' appearances and how we are allowed to see them, and it lets other characters' imagination overtake the narrative in a way that usually only Will's does. But in catching up with Hannibal's many victims from season 2, it has a clarity and sense of purpose that the series occasionally ignores in favor of putting its audience into a dream state right along with Will." Mark Rozeman of Paste gave the episode a 9.5 out of 10 and wrote, "Despite how much I enjoyed the experimental entries earlier this season, 'Aperitivo' provides a welcome relief from that structure, again proving that Hannibal knows exactly when to pivot its approach to avoid becoming stale. What's all the more amazing is how much information is presented in the course of the episode's 42 minutes and yet it never really ends up feeling overstuffed or that it's short-shrifting one story for the sake of another. It's masterful, brilliantly constructed television that finds Bryan Fuller and Co. firing on all cylinders." Jeff Stone of IndieWire gave the episode a "B−" and wrote, "This episode takes a real Three Kings approach to its violence, giving us super-close-ups of bullets bursting through cheeks or knives slicing through flesh. Alana even gets a full skeletal x-ray as she’s falling out the window, like she's in a Mortal Kombat sequence. We also get a close-up of Mason's carved-up, noseless face. Hey, Hannibal's not even in this episode — we have to take our grossness where we can find it!"

Brian Moylan of The Guardian wrote, "There's a sense of melancholy heading into watching this episode of Hannibal. It's one unlike the typical sense of melancholy, the sense of steeling oneself for the dark and twisted turns of the series. This time around, it's the fact that, no matter how good the episode could be (and of course ends up being), it will have to take a back seat to the fact that NBC just cancelled Hannibal." Jonathon Dornbush of Entertainment Weekly wrote, "Hannibal has revealed its hand for season 3 at a measured pace, focusing its first few episodes on Hannibal's new life, followed then by the revelation that Will and Jack both survived 'Mizumono' and have followed him abroad." Chuck Bowen of Slant Magazine wrote, "The title of last night's episode of Hannibal, 'Aperitivo', is a reference to an alcoholic drink served at the beginning of a meal to stimulate the appetite. Correspondingly, the episode functions as a tone-setter and palette cleanser, sketching in the events that immediately transpired in the wake of the titular character's rampage at the end of the last season. Conventionally, this should have been the first episode of this season, but what fun would that be?"

Kayti Burt of Den of Geek gave the episode a perfect 5 star rating out of 5 and wrote, "Hannibal was notably (mostly) missing from this episode. His presence was felt in the damage he has left behind, but this Hannibal-shaped hole obviously lacks the same charisma of the real thing. However, it was nice to get a break from the Hannibal-and-Will story for one episode. Even if we are treated to some of the most intimately gruesome images of the series thus far, without Hannibal around, the dread factor (and my heart rate) stays considerably lower." Nick McHatton of TV Fanatic gave the episode a 4 star rating out of 5 and wrote, "This episode was something I had been looking forward to. I had been itching to learn who these people had become after being Hannibal's victims. They each have their scars, and they're each affected differently. However, I'm not enjoying who Will is becoming." Emma Dibdin of Digital Spy wrote, "So now, after this episode which must be the most Hannibal-light in Hannibal history, the stage is set for an extraordinarily bloody showdown in Italy. And really, what better kind of showdown is there than one in which at least three major characters may want to eat each other?"

Adam Lehrer of Forbes wrote, "In the first three episodes of the season, we as viewers did not know why exactly Will was in Europe looking for Hannibal. Was he there because he missed Hannibal? Needed to talk things out? Wanted to kill him in cold blood? Now we do know. Though it was confirmed in this episode how deeply Will feels for Hannibal, it appears that his commitment to justice has taken precedence. Despite the bizarre and unlikely interactions between altruistic characters like Alana and repulsive ones like Mason all conspiring to bring Hannibal down, Will knows that he alone can bring Hannibal to justice. Whether the show ends this season or not, I believe we are about to get a very exciting ending to this chapter in the story of Hannibal Lecter." Britt Hayes of ScreenCrush wrote, "The end of the episode adds further complexity to Will's mental state: while he's still enamored with his 'friend' and needs to reunite with Hannibal in order to reconcile his confused feelings, he remains morally clear. What Will needs is closure."
