= Contorno (Hannibal) =

- Hannibal episode
- Episode no.: Season 3 Episode 5
- Directed by: Guillermo Navarro
- Written by: Tom de Ville; Bryan Fuller; Steve Lightfoot
- Cinematography by: James Hawkinson
- Editing by: Ben Wilkinson
- Production code: 305
- Original air date: July 2, 2015
- Running time: 44 minutes

Guest appearances
- Joe Anderson as Mason Verger; Fortunato Cerlino as Rinaldo Pazzi; Tao Okamoto as Chiyoh; Mía Maestro as Allegra Pazzi

Episode chronology
← Previous "Aperitivo"	Next → "Dolce"
- Hannibal season 3

"Contorno" is the fifth episode of the third season of the psychological thriller–horror series Hannibal. It is the 31st overall episode of the series and was written by Tom de Ville, series creator Bryan Fuller, and executive producer Steve Lightfoot and directed by Guillermo Navarro. It was first broadcast on July 2, 2015, on NBC.

The series is based on characters and elements appearing in Thomas Harris' novels Red Dragon and Hannibal, with focus on the relationship between FBI special investigator Will Graham (Hugh Dancy) and Dr. Hannibal Lecter (Mads Mikkelsen), a forensic psychiatrist destined to become Graham's most cunning enemy. The episode revolves around Hannibal Lecter's pursuit, with Inspector Rinaldo Pazzi closing in on him, seeking to get a $3 million bounty from Mason Verger.

According to Nielsen Media Research, the episode was seen by an estimated 1.23 million household viewers and gained a 0.4/1 ratings share among adults aged 18–49. The episode received critical acclaim, with critics praising the episode's pace compared to the previous episodes, performances and the climactic fight between Jack Crawford and Hannibal Lecter.

== Plot ==
Graham (Hugh Dancy) and Chiyoh (Tao Okamoto) travel to Florence. While on the train, Chiyoh explains her experience working as an attendant to Lady Murasaki and how she felt disturbed by Lecter (Mads Mikkelsen). In Florence, Lecter and Bedelia (Gillian Anderson) discuss Lecter's idea of eating Graham whenever he finds him.

Also in Florence, Crawford releases Bella's ashes in a river and then throws his wedding ring. He then has dinner with Pazzi (Fortunato Cerlino) and his wife Allegra (Mía Maestro). Pazzi shares with Crawford that he is working on his own with Lecter, not revealing information to his colleagues until he concludes it is Lecter behind everything. While tending to Mason (Joe Anderson), Bloom (Caroline Dhavernas) reveals that she discovered information about Lecter having his errands bought by a "blonde woman".

Pazzi visits Lecter at the Palazzo Capponi. He questions "Fell" about the murders of his predecessors but Lecter claims not to know anything. Pazzi leaves and calls a lawyer, wanting to report Lecter's whereabouts and a possible bounty from Mason Verger. The lawyer states there are some criminal jurisdictions that may make it difficult for him, so he refers Pazzi to an attorney in Geneva. Lecter reveals to Bedelia that he is aware of Pazzi's intentions but that he will take care of him. Back in the train, Graham asks Chiyoh how she could find Lecter, and she states she knows he is Florence. Suddenly, Chiyoh throws him off the train. Graham survives but he must continue on foot.

Pazzi video chats with Mason, who agrees to give him $3 million if he brings Lecter alive, but says he needs to get Lecter's fingerprints. Pazzi agrees, with Mason aware that Lecter could kill him. Pazzi once again visits Lecter, offering him a scold's bridle belonging to his ancestor Francesco de' Pazzi. Lecter then shows him an heirloom depicting de' Pazzi's murder, noting how history alternates over whether he died with "bowels in" or "bowels out". Pazzi tries to get his fingerprint with a knife but Lecter anticipates this and knocks him unconscious.

When he wakes up, Pazzi finds himself tied to a hand truck as Lecter makes final arrangements. Lecter states that as Pazzi didn't contact the police, he must have gone to Mason Verger for the bounty. Suddenly, Bloom calls Pazzi's phone to warn him about Lecter, but Lecter himself answers and brushes her off. He then cuts Pazzi's belly and throws him from the window, hanging him from the neck and spilling his bowels in the ground, in a similar manner to Francesco de' Pazzi. He then notices Crawford staring at him from the ground. Crawford then furiously enters the Palazzo Capponi. Lecter anticipates Crawford, taunting him for Bella's death. Crawford surprises him and brutally attacks him. When Lecter asks him how he will feel when Lecter dies, Crawford replies "alive" and hurls him from the window. However, Lecter survives the fall by hanging on to Pazzi's corpse. After touching the ground, he walks away, wounded.

== Production ==
In April 2015, Guillermo Navarro announced that he would direct the fifth episode of the season. In June 2015, NBC announced that the fifth episode of the season would be titled "Contorno", with Tom de Ville, series creator Bryan Fuller and executive producer Steve Lightfoot writing the episode and Navarro directing. This was Fuller's 25th writing credit, de Ville's first writing credit, Lightfoot's 14th writing credit, and Navarro's fourth directing credit.

== Reception ==
=== Viewers ===
The episode was watched by 1.23 million viewers, earning a 0.4/1 in the 18-49 rating demographics on the Nielson ratings scale. This means that 0.4 percent of all households with televisions watched the episode, while 1 percent of all households watching television at that time watched it. This was a 16% decrease from the previous episode, which was watched by 1.46 million viewers with a 0.4/1 in the 18-49 demographics. With these ratings, Hannibal ranked third on its timeslot and twelfth for the night in the 18-49 demographics, behind Aquarius, Mistresses, Boom!, Food Fighters, Rookie Blue, The Astronaut Wives Club, Wayward Pines, a Mom rerun, Under the Dome, a The Big Bang Theory rerun, and Big Brother.

With DVR factored, the episode was watched by 1.75 million viewers with a 0.6 on the 18-49 demo.

=== Critical reviews ===
"Contorno" received critical acclaim. Eric Goldman of IGN gave the episode an "amazing" 9.3 out of 10 and wrote in his verdict: "The more deliberately placed, esoteric feel of Season 3 took a turn this week in a big way, as Jack found Hannibal and once more, all hell broke loose in an absolutely thrilling manner. With his location known by many now, and having been badly injured, Hannibal seems more vulnerable than usual – but knowing what we know about him, it's hard not to ponder what diabolical move he might turn to next."

Molly Eichel of The A.V. Club gave the episode an "A−" and wrote, "The tides are turning on Hannibal, and while Lecter escaped this time around, his capture will come sooner rather than later. 'Contorno' is the first episode of the third season that is not consumed by (necessary) exposition. Now, the plot moves forward."

Alan Sepinwall of HitFix wrote, "Some of the issue comes from the act of taking material that's fit well into various feature films and stretching it out over many weeks of a TV season. In the first two seasons, the show did very well at not making Hannibal's continued freedom feel dragged out, or like something that made the other characters into idiots. That's a much harder thing to do now that everyone knows exactly who and what he is. Fuller has already admitted that he had to tighten up parts of this season's storytelling for exactly that reason. Some of these early episodes have been great, but others have me thinking he should have tried compressing things even more." Mark Rozeman of Paste gave the episode an 8.5 out of 10 and wrote, "The episode more than picked up the slack in its latter half, setting the stage for Hannibal's comeuppance over the final two episodes of this Italy arc. And while I'm certainly thrilled to see how Fuller and Co. cap off this offbeat experiment in television structure, I'd be lying if I didn't mention that the slower parts made me antsy for the upcoming Red Dragon arc." Jeff Stone of IndieWire gave the episode a "B+" and wrote, "Turns out, this show is much more exciting when the characters aren't forlornly looking into the middle distance and hitting the same thematic points for weeks on end!"

Brian Moylan of The Guardian wrote, "If this episode is the closest Jack gets to absolute revenge, then so be it. In such a grim series, there sometimes need to be a little bit of fun, even if it stems from something that is so completely rage-fueled. It definitely helps that La Pie Voleuse plays over the scene. That's the sound of catharsis." Jonathon Dornbush of Entertainment Weekly wrote, "'Cortono' is the first episode of Hannibal where Hannibal seems trapped. He barely escapes being beaten to death by Jack Crawford, and we know that other enemies are moving toward him in Florence. Mason Verger and Alana Bloom track his truffle purchases and put a bounty on his head. Will Graham and Chiyoh take the train south from Lithuania. The drama comes not from Hannibal's eventual capture, which seems almost inevitable, but from the way his enemies seem so clumsy." Chuck Bowen of Slant Magazine wrote, "Last night's episode of Hannibal, 'Contorno', is both conveniently and poetically ludicrous. Repetition has inescapably set into this season's Italian sojourn, which partially accounts for why last week's superb American flashback episode, 'Aperitivo', felt so sharp."

Kayti Burt of Den of Geek gave the episode a 4 star rating out of 5 and wrote, "All of our players begin to converge in this week's episode of Hannibal, no longer content to live in the echoes of the trauma Hannibal has caused, but ready to enact fresh violence of their own." Nick McHatton of TV Fanatic gave the episode a 4 star rating out of 5 and wrote, "So you have it, a seemingly mediocre installment of Hannibal saved in the last five minutes by Jack Crawford becoming my favorite person and beating the puns out of Hannibal Lecter."

Emma Dibdin of Digital Spy wrote, "As soon as we saw Inspector Pazzi and his lovely wife sharing a lovely, non-cannibalistic pasta meal with Jack, didn't you just get a sinking feeling? 'Contorno' is packed to the gills with tense, loaded interactions steeped in mutual distrust, interactions in which you sense two people are just seconds from double-crossing or physically attacking each other – Hannibal and Pazzi, Will and Chiyoh, Alana and Mason, Hannibal and Bedelia. Violence, or the threat of it, underlies every single conversation, and that nice dinner is the exception that proves the rule." Adam Lehrer of Forbes wrote, "Having completely abandoned its formulaic 'monster of the week' format that kept the series grounded in its first two seasons, Hannibal's third season almost feels like a film continuation of the series. It's been a thrilling five episodes. Maybe you feel like the show has drifted too deep into the meta, but the scenes of double entendre-laden dialog are nice reprieves from the show's explosive and gory violence that last night's episode, 'Contorno', had in spades."
