= Digestivo (Hannibal) =

- Hannibal episode
- Episode no.: Season 3 Episode 7
- Directed by: Adam Kane
- Written by: Steve Lightfoot; Bryan Fuller
- Cinematography by: James Hawkinson
- Editing by: Michael Doherty
- Production code: 307
- Original air dates: July 16, 2015 (Canada); July 18, 2015 (U.S.)
- Running time: 44 minutes

Guest appearances
- Joe Anderson as Mason Verger; Katharine Isabelle as Margot Verger; Tao Okamoto as Chiyoh; Glenn Fleshler as Dr. Cordell Doemling; Giorgio Lupano as Inspector Benetti; Phillip Samuel as Verger Bodyguard

Episode chronology
← Previous "Dolce"	Next → "The Great Red Dragon"
- Hannibal season 3

"Digestivo" is the seventh episode of the third season of the psychological thriller–horror series Hannibal. It is the 33rd overall episode of the series and was written by executive producer Steve Lightfoot and series creator Bryan Fuller and directed by Adam Kane. It was first broadcast on July 16, 2015 on Canada, and then July 18, 2015 on NBC.

The series is based on characters and elements appearing in Thomas Harris' novels Red Dragon and Hannibal, with focus on the relationship between FBI special investigator Will Graham (Hugh Dancy) and Dr. Hannibal Lecter (Mads Mikkelsen), a forensic psychiatrist destined to become Graham's most cunning enemy. The episode revolves around Lecter and Graham being kidnapped by Mason Verger (Joe Anderson) to torture and kill them.

According to Nielsen Media Research, the episode was seen by an estimated 0.97 million household viewers and gained a 0.3/1 ratings share among adults aged 18–49. The episode received universal acclaim from critics, who praised the performances, directing, writing, resolution to Mason Verger's storyline, and the final scene of the episode, being deemed as one of the series' best moments.

== Plot ==
Police officials led by Inspector Benetti (Giorgio Lupano) interrupt the meeting between Hannibal Lecter (Mads Mikkelsen), Will Graham (Hugh Dancy) and Jack Crawford (Laurence Fishburne). Despite Crawford claiming to be a federal agent, the police ignore him, only taking Lecter and Graham with them, intending to deliver them to Mason Verger (Joe Anderson). Officers then prepare to kill Crawford, but he is saved by Chiyoh (Tao Okamoto), who kills the officers. They leave to find Lecter and Graham in Muskrat Farm, despite Crawford having to evade authorities.

At Muskrat Farm, Mason informs Lecter and Graham about Crawford's "death", which will be blamed on Lecter. They have dinner, where Mason states his intentions of eating Lecter and then cutting off Graham's face so he can wear it. Graham wounds Cordell (Glenn Fleshler) by biting his cheek and is told that he will be fed to the pigs after they remove his face. Meanwhile, Margot (Katharine Isabelle) starts conspiring with Alana Bloom (Caroline Dhavernas) to get Mason's sperm in hopes of conceiving a child, with Bloom acting as the surrogate. However, Mason is aware of their relationship and intentions and says that he has already found a surrogate, just saying "she is on the farm".

While Bloom explains her decisions with Graham, Margot visits a caged Lecter, who tells her that Mason will betray her. Bloom suddenly arrives and tranquilizes a guard. She then approaches, willing to release him if he can "save Will", which he promises. She releases him, but Lecter states that Margot must be the one to kill Mason so she can take the sperm, with Lecter taking the blame for her. Mason's surgery begins and he is put under anesthesia, but Cordell starts slicing into Graham's face without using anesthesia on him. Lecter arrives and kills Cordell, cutting off his face and putting it on Mason's, who is horrified to discover it when he wakes up.

Bloom and Margot find the surrogate and are horrified to discover that it is a pig carrying a human fetus. When they remove the child, they find that it is stillborn. They confront Mason, who just found out about Lecter's killing spree. Margot intends to kill Mason, although Mason states he kept his promise and that if he dies, she will lose the fortune. However, Bloom reveals that Lecter managed to get his sperm by stimulating his prostate with a cattle prod while he was under anesthesia and kept it in a vial. Mason tries to shoot them, but Margot fights with him, with the bullet piercing the aquarium beneath his bedroom floor. Margot shoves Mason's pet moray down his throat, which suffocates him to death.

Lecter takes Graham to his house in Virginia, evading Mason's guards with Chiyoh's help. The next morning, Lecter and Chiyoh part ways after Lecter reveals that while he ate his long-dead sister Mischa, he didn't kill her. Graham tells Lecter he will let him escape, but wants nothing more to do with him. After saying goodbye, Graham sees Lecter leave the house. By nightfall, Crawford and the police arrive, looking for Lecter. Lecter is revealed to be still in the area, and willingly surrenders in front of Graham. In the distance, Chiyoh sees Lecter being taken by the authorities.

== Production ==
=== Development ===
In June 2015, NBC announced that the seventh episode of the season would be titled "Digestivo", with executive producer Steve Lightfoot and series creator Bryan Fuller writing the episode and Adam Kane directing. This was Fuller's 27th writing credit, Lightfoot's 16th writing credit, and Kane's first directing credit. The episode was originally scheduled to air on July 16, 2015 but it moved to July 18, 2015 when NBC decided to move the remainder of the season to Saturdays.

=== Writing ===
Fuller explained that the episode would serve as a closure to the first chapter of the season, "the first half of the season will have its finale that reaches a climax and wraps up that story in a great way, and then we start a new story, and then that will have its own climax at the end of the season. Two separate stories that’ll have two finales and so you get two seasons for the price of one."

== Reception ==
=== Viewers ===
The episode was watched by 0.97 million viewers, earning a 0.3/1 in the 18-49 rating demographics on the Nielson ratings scale. This means that 0.4 percent of all households with televisions watched the episode, while 1 percent of all households watching television at that time watched it. This was a 30% decrease from the previous episode, which was watched by 1.38 million viewers with a 0.4/1 in the 18-49 demographics. With these ratings, Hannibal ranked third on its time slot and ninth for the night in the 18-49 demographics, behind two episodes of The Millers, a Bullseye rerun, a Boom! rerun, a Running Wild with Bear Grylls rerun, ABC Saturday Movie of the Week, and two episodes of 48 Hours.

With DVR factored, the episode was watched by 1.45 million viewers with a 0.5 on the 18-49 demo.

=== Critical reviews ===
"Digestivo" received universal acclaim from critics. Eric Goldman of IGN called the episode a perfect "masterpiece", rating it 10 out of 10 and writing in his verdict: "Hannibal's mid-season episode managed to function as a very satisfying resolution to both the 'Hannibal on the run' and Mason Verger storylines. Alana and Margot triumphed over Mason, Hannibal got to do his thing as Alana set him loose to help stop their common foe and Will finally managed to put an end with his own need to track down Hannibal. And Jack managed to actually arrest Hannibal Lecter, even if it was because Hannibal decided to turn himself in – on the heels of an incredibly powerful heart to heart with Will. It seems as though next week’s episode, with its time jump and Red Dragon storyline beginning, will truly feel like a different season. In the meantime, this 7-episode arc was extremely satisfying on its own."

Molly Eichel of The A.V. Club gave the episode an "A−" and wrote, "One of the innovations that I appreciate about Hannibal is the show's disregard for the season break. Much like the second season, the third season breaks in the middle when one storyline is up, in order for another one to begin. Mason Verger has served his purpose as a character, and now it's time for something new."

Alan Sepinwall of HitFix wrote, "In tying up Hannibal's fugitive adventures and killing off Mason and Cordell, 'Digestivo' was also easily the most coherent episode of the season so far." Mark Rozeman of Paste gave the episode a 9.6 out of 10 and wrote, "After the utter insanity of last week, 'Digestivo' manages an appropriately kooky finish to this peculiar mini-arc. What remains most impressive, however, is the ways in which the show manages to effectively checklist all the strange plot points in [Thomas] Harris' Hannibal, while assuring that this final confrontation between Will and Hannibal does not come across as an underwhelming afterthought." Jeff Stone of IndieWire gave the episode an "A−" and wrote, "We finally get the emotional showdown between Will and Hannibal we've been waiting for. Will, in no uncertain terms, tells Hannibal that he's not going to look for him or miss him. He's letting Hannibal go, emotionally and physically. 'I don't have your appetite', he admits, which is something of a relief. I'm not particularly interested in Will and Hannibal as murder pals, and kudos to the show for always making that a distinct, sickening possibility."

Brian Moylan of The Guardian wrote, "Either way, Hannibal is a genius, but if he's improvising it makes more sense why his luck will eventually run out, since the second half of this season – and the show's final run before the finale – ends with his eventual capture." Keith Staskiewicz of Entertainment Weekly wrote, "Are you tired of bland meat products processed in giant factory farms owned by faceless mega-corporations? Looking for a company with a more personal touch? Well come on down to Muskrat Farms, where we believe in old-fashioned things like good service, fresh all-natural ingredients, and gestating a human fetus in a sow’s uterus. Oh, and no preservatives!" Chuck Bowen of Slant Magazine wrote, "The most distinctive quality of Hannibal this season is its nearly pure amorality. There might not be another series on television right now in which no interior value system is courted or pandered to, apart from a treasuring of phenomenal aesthetics."

Greg Cwik of Vulture gave the episode a perfect 5 star rating out of 5 and wrote, "'Digestivo' is an ellipsis of an episode, the transitional, and transitory, chapter that skulks between the season's two halves. It begins with Hannibal Lecter sawing into Will Graham's skull; it ends with Will Graham saying good-bye to Hannibal Lecter. In the 45-minute interval between those two moments, life is engendered and life is ended and Will and Hannibal's relationship reaches its inevitable conclusion." Kayti Burt of Den of Geek gave the episode a 4.5 star rating out of 5 and wrote, "The closing of the Italian story arc was fast-paced, emotionally-resonant, and filled with cringe-worthy moments, the perfect cap to the meditative strangeness of Season 3's first half that leaves us with that familiar, lingering question: Will Will Graham ever be free of Hannibal Lecter?" Nick McHatton of TV Fanatic gave the episode a perfect 5 star rating out of 5 and wrote, "This was easily, by a mile, my favorite episode of the season so far. Fantastic performances by the whole cast (especially Mads), swiftly moving plot, and a phenomenal resolution."

Emma Dibdin of Digital Spy wrote, "Will is like an addict going cold turkey here, and Hannibal is both the drug and the enabler, waiting to surrender himself until he's certain Will is there to witness it. So now that Will has been robbed of the blissful ignorance he wanted, and knows exactly where Hannibal is, how long is he going to be able to stay away?" Adam Lehrer of Forbes wrote, "Wow. Finally, we see the episode that reveals how the FBI captures Hannibal. True to the contrary nature of the series, the end result is absolutely nothing what we would have expected. The seventh episode of the third season, ‘Digestivo,’ transpires through a radically different format than the six episodes that preceded it. The entire episode takes place on Mason Verger's own house of horrors, Muskrat Farm. The show transitions from a cross-continental thriller to a haunted house story and it still manages to close out several plot lines in one setting." Britt Hayes of ScreenCrush wrote, "'Digestivo' is a total killer of an episode — it's intense, sickening, startling, and romantic in ways that are at once both grotesque and sentimental."
