= Hannibal season 3 =

Season of television series

Hannibal
- Season 3
- Promotional poster
- Starring: Hugh Dancy; Mads Mikkelsen; Caroline Dhavernas; Gillian Anderson; Laurence Fishburne; Scott Thompson; Aaron Abrams
- No. of episodes: 13

Release
- Original network: NBC
- Original release: June 4 – August 29, 2015

Season chronology
- ← Previous; Season 2

The third and final season of the American television series Hannibal premiered on June 4, 2015. The season is produced by Dino de Laurentiis Company, Living Dead Guy Productions, AXN Original Productions, and Gaumont International Television, with Sidonie Dumas, Christophe Riandee, Katie O'Connell, Elisa Todd Ellis, David Slade, Steve Lightfoot, Martha De Laurentiis, and Bryan Fuller serving as executive producers. Fuller serves as the series developer and showrunner, co-writing all 13 episodes of the season.

The season was ordered in May 2014. The season stars Hugh Dancy, Mads Mikkelsen, Caroline Dhavernas, Gillian Anderson, and Laurence Fishburne, with Scott Thompson and Aaron Abrams receiving "also starring" status. The series is based on characters and elements appearing in Thomas Harris' novels Red Dragon (1981), Hannibal (1999), and Hannibal Rising (2006) and focuses on the relationship between FBI special investigator Will Graham and Dr. Hannibal Lecter, a forensic psychiatrist who is secretly a cannibalistic serial killer. The first half of the season serves as a loose adaptation of Hannibal while also adapting some elements from Hannibal Rising; the second half of the season adapts the plot of Red Dragon. The first seven episodes of season are named after different courses of Italian cuisine, the subsequent five are named for William Blake's series of The Great Red Dragon Paintings, and the finale's title is a phrase from Revelation 6:16.

The season premiered on June 4, 2015, on NBC. The season premiere received 2.57 million viewers with a 0.7/2 ratings share in the 18–49 demographics. The season ended on August 29, 2015, with an average of 1.31 million viewers, which was a 48% drop from the previous season. The season received acclaim from critics and audiences, praising the performances, writing, character development, cinematography and faithfulness to its source material. The series finale was particularly praised. Nevertheless, the season's low viewership prompted NBC to cancel the series in June 2015. Despite efforts in finding a new network for the series, as of June 2022, the series remains cancelled.

== Cast and characters ==
=== Main ===
- Hugh Dancy as Will Graham
- Mads Mikkelsen as Dr. Hannibal Lecter
- Caroline Dhavernas as Alana Bloom
- Gillian Anderson as Bedelia Du Maurier
- Laurence Fishburne as Jack Crawford
- Scott Thompson as Jimmy Price
- Aaron Abrams as Brian Zeller

=== Recurring ===
- Richard Armitage as Francis Dolarhyde
- Rutina Wesley as Reba McClane
- Joe Anderson as Mason Verger
- Nina Arianda as Molly Graham
- Fortunato Cerlino as Inspector Rinaldo Pazzi
- Raúl Esparza as Dr. Frederick Chilton
- Katharine Isabelle as Margot Verger
- Tao Okamoto as Chiyoh
- Glenn Fleshler as Dr. Cordell Doemling
- Kacey Rohl as Abigail Hobbs
- Lara Jean Chorostecki as Freddie Lounds
- Giorgio Lupano as Inspector Benetti
- Zachary Quinto as Neal Frank
- Rinaldo Rocco as Sogliato
- Vladimir Jon Cubrt as Garrett Jacob Hobbs
- Eddie Izzard as Abel Gideon
- Gina Torres as Phyllis "Bella" Crawford

=== Notable guests ===
- Tom Wisdom as Antony Dimmond
- Julian Richings as Caged Man
- Mía Maestro as Allegra Pazzi

== Episodes ==
No. overall	No. in season	Title	Directed by	Written by	Original release date	Prod. code	U.S. viewers (millions)
27	1	"Antipasto"	Vincenzo Natali	Bryan Fuller & Steve Lightfoot	June 4, 2015	301	2.57
Several months after foiling Will and Jack's sting operation, (Note: As depicted in "Mizumono".) Hannibal, in Paris, stalks and murders Roman Fell and his wife so he and Du Maurier can assume their identities. While Abel Gideon eats himself, (Note: Takes place during "Futamono".) he notes that Hannibal will be cannibalized someday. After being interviewed by the BAU, (Note: As depicted in "Tome-wan".) Du Maurier finds Hannibal showering in her home. Some years earlier, Hannibal finds her with the body of Neal Frank (Note: As referenced in "Relevés" and "Tome-wan".) and helps her frame the scene as entirely self-defense. In the present, they travel to Florence, where Hannibal meets Sogliato, a professor who challenges his knowledge of Dante, and Antony Dimmond, an associate of Fell's he met in Paris. He invites Dimmond to a lecture he is giving on Dante to upstage Sogliato, which he attends, noting that Hannibal is using Fell's identity. When Dimmond confronts and tries to blackmail him, Hannibal kills him, mutilates his body to resemble a heart, and leaves it in the Cappella Palatina.
28	2	"Primavera"	Vincenzo Natali	Jeff Vlaming and Bryan Fuller	June 11, 2015	302	1.66
Having survived his stabbing, (Note: As depicted in "Mizumono".) Will wakes in the hospital and is visited by Abigail Hobbs, who explains that Hannibal wounded them precisely so they would survive. Will remembers Hannibal describing the chapel as a place of peace for him, and eight months later, he goes with Abigail after Dimmond's body is found. He is met by Florence chief inspector Rinaldo Pazzi, who investigated Hannibal twenty years prior for killings that he modeled after the painting Primavera, for which another man was convicted. As Will uses his ability, he sees the "heart" growing antlers and stalking towards him. Talking with Abigail, he realizes he has been hallucinating her and she died of her injuries. Pazzi realizes Hannibal is watching them and the two chase him into the nearby catacombs. Pazzi leaves after losing Hannibal, but Will stays and says "I forgive you," which Hannibal hears.
29	3	"Secondo"	Vincenzo Natali	Angelina Burnett and Bryan Fuller & Steve Lightfoot	June 18, 2015	303	1.69
Will travels to Aukštaitija to visits Hannibal's childhood home, which is occupied by Chiyoh, the loyal attendant to his aunt. Will finds a man caged in the cellar, and she explains that he killed and ate Mischa Lecter, (Note: Hannibal's deceased sister who was first referenced in "Kō No Mono".) though Will notes that she only knows this through Hannibal and could have been deceived. He frees the man, who attacks Chiyoh, forcing her to kill him. She accuses Will of Hannibal-like behavior, but with her only tie to the house dead, she agrees to help him find Hannibal. Before they leave, Will fashions the man's corpse to resemble a dragonfly. Jack, having also survived, comes to Italy to bring Will home and meets Pazzi. At a dinner with Sogliato, Hannibal stabs him in the head with an ice pick, forcing Du Maurier to remove it to end his suffering, killing him. They discuss Mischa, and Du Maurier concludes that Hannibal ate her to "forgive her" for causing him to "betray" himself, and that he will have to "forgive" Will in the same way.
30	4	"Aperitivo"	Marc Jobst	Nick Antosca and Bryan Fuller & Steve Lightfoot	June 25, 2015	304	1.46
Frederick Chilton, having been exonerated after his framing as the Chesapeake Ripper, (Note: As depicted in "Futamono".) meets with Mason Verger, who has put a heavy bounty on Hannibal. He is planning to eat Hannibal alive, and Alana, having also survived, introduces herself as his new therapist and offers to help catch Hannibal. Chilton visits Will when he wakes, who sees Abigail in place of him. Jack visits Will to confirm the narrative that they were both wounded trying to stop Hannibal, and Will confirms that he alerted Hannibal of his impending arrest (Note: As depicted in "Mizumono".) because he wanted to run away with him. Chilton asks Jack to help him catch Hannibal, but he is more concerned with caring for the increasingly ill Bella Crawford, who dies, though it is left ambiguous if Jack euthanized her. He is horrified to see Hannibal's card offering condolences at her funeral. Will leaves for Italy by boat.
31	5	"Contorno"	Guillermo Navarro	Tom de Ville and Bryan Fuller & Steve Lightfoot	July 2, 2015	305	1.23
As Will and Chiyoh travel back to Florence by train, she begins to doubt their alliance and throws him off. Alana informs Mason that she has tracked Hannibal down through Du Maurier, who does his grocery shopping. After tossing his wedding ring and Bella's ashes into a river in Florence, the city where they met, Jack has dinner with Pazzi, who is withholding information from his superiors until he can confirm that Hannibal is behind the recent murders. Pazzi gets in contact with Mason, who offers him $3 million for Hannibal's capture but asks him to get his fingerprints first. Pazzi meets with Hannibal, who, aware of his intentions, subdues him. After confirming with Pazzi that Mason sent him, Hannibal kills him in a manner referencing his ancestor Francesco de' Pazzi by disembowling and hanging him. Jack arrives on the scene and throws Hannibal out the window after a fight, who survives by lowering himself to the ground with Pazzi's corpse.
32	6	"Dolce"	Vincenzo Natali	Don Mancini and Bryan Fuller & Steve Lightfoot	July 9, 2015	306	1.38
Will arrives at the scene and admits to Jack that part of him wants Hannibal to get away. They go to interrogate Du Maurier, who drugs herself to convince herself of her cover as Fell's wife, not slipping up during questioning despite them knowing her true identity. Alana suggests to Mason that he buy out the Florence police force, and he expresses to Margot his desire to conceive a child with her. She has sex with Alana and asks if she knows how to harvest sperm. Will meets Hannibal at a gallery while he looks at Primavera, and is shot by a watching Chiyoh when he tries to stab Hannibal. Hannibal takes Will to a hideout and removes the bullet, while the police press Du Maurier for his location. Jack arrives first and Hannibal restrains him, forcing him to watch as he starts to cut open Will's head. Will and Hannibal are then suddenly shown back in America, held captive at Mason's farm.
33	7	"Digestivo"	Adam Kane	Steve Lightfoot and Bryan Fuller	July 16, 2015 (Canada); July 18, 2015 (U.S.)	307	0.97
The Polizia di Stato, hired by Mason, kidnap Hannibal and Will, while Chiyoh saves Jack from a pair of officers and he gives her Mason's location. Mason informs Hannibal of his intent to eat him while wearing Will's severed face, so Hannibal convinces Margot and Alana to free him. He kills Mason's surgeon before he can mutilate Will, while Margot finds that the surrogate mother Mason promised would deliver her a Verger child is a pig carrying a stillborn human baby. While Mason is under anesthesia for the face transplant, Hannibal helps her retrieve his semen through prostate stimulation before taking Will back to his house, being saved from Mason's men by Chiyoh along the way. When Mason wakes, Margot informs him of her plan to impregnate Alana with his sperm before the women drown him in his aquarium, where his Kidako moray swims down his throat. At Will's, Hannibal admits to Chiyoh that he ate but did not kill Mischa. She leaves, and Will tells Hannibal he will let him escape but wants nothing more to do with him. He calls the FBI, only for Hannibal to return and surrender when they arrive.
34	8	"The Great Red Dragon"	Neil Marshall	Nick Antosca & Steve Lightfoot and Bryan Fuller	July 23, 2015 (Canada); July 25, 2015 (U.S.)	308	0.96
After seeing the painting The Great Red Dragon and the Woman Clothed with the Sun, Francis Dolarhyde develops an obsession with it and begins remaking himself via physical transformation. Three years after Hannibal's arrest, Dolarhyde has begun killing happy families each full moon, putting mirror fragments over their eyes and mouths. Chilton, now a true crime novelist, visits Hannibal, incarcerated at the Baltimore State Hospital, for insight. Hannibal writes an American Journal of Psychiatry article correcting many of the errors in Chilton's book about him, while Dolarhyde becomes interested in him after reading the book. With three weeks before the next full moon, Jack visits a retired Will, who agrees to help with the blessing of his wife Molly, though he receives a letter from Hannibal warning him not to get involved. He goes to Dolarhyde's most recent crime scene and uses his ability, while Price and Zeller find a partial fingerprint on a mirror piece and create a mold of Dolarhyde's fanged dentures. Needing assistance, Will reluctantly visits Hannibal.
35	9	"...And the Woman Clothed with the Sun"	John Dahl	Jeff Vlaming & Helen Shang and Bryan Fuller & Steve Lightfoot	July 30, 2015 (Canada); August 1, 2015 (U.S.)	309	1.02
After faking Abigail's death, (Note: As depicted in "Relevés".) Hannibal has a session with her where he convinces her to slit the throat of Garret Jacob Hobbs's stolen corpse. While she and Hannibal wait for Jack to arrive at his house, (Note: Takes place during "Mizumono".) she worries about being caught, but he insists that they have to wait for Will. In the present, Hannibal agrees to help catch Dolarhyde, while Bloom, now the hospital's administrator and married with a son to Margot, warns him to stay in line. Studying the murders, Will deduces that Dolarhyde kills naked so he can "clean" himself in the full moon as he begins having nightmares about killing the families himself. He finds the Han for "red dragon" carved into a tree on a victim's property and runs into Freddie Lounds as he leaves, who photographed him leaving his meeting with Hannibal and wrote an article about their relationship. Dolarhyde reads it and watches film he took of his murder scenes. While developing film, he meets blind Reba McClane, who he drives home as she takes an interest in him. He calls Hannibal from his old office posing as his attorney and informs him that he is becoming "the Great Red Dragon."
36	10	"...And the Woman Clothed in Sun"	Guillermo Navarro	Don Mancini and Bryan Fuller	August 6, 2015 (Canada); August 8, 2015 (U.S.)	310	1.01
Dolarhyde admits he is obsessed with Hannibal and would like him to "meld with the strength of the Dragon." He takes Reba on a date to a zoo, where she is given the chance to touch a sedated tiger. They later have sex, during which he sees her as the woman from the painting. The next morning, he is horrified to realize that the Dragon wants Reba as its next victim. After observing Du Maurier giving a lecture on her time as Hannibal's victim, Will confronts her on her culpability. They discuss Neal, and Du Maurier recalls that, aggravated by Hannibal's manipulation of him, he swallowed his own tongue during a nervous breakdown and died when she reached down his throat trying to resuscitate him. She tells Will that he still has time to save himself from Hannibal. Having tricked Chilton's secretary into giving him Will's address, Hannibal brings up the Great Red Dragon paintings to him while they analyze Dolarhyde's motives. Dolarhyde sneaks into the Brooklyn Museum to gain access to the original copy of The Great Red Dragon and the Woman Clothed with the Sun, where he eats it in an attempt to break its hold over him. Will arrives, and Dolarhyde incapacitates him and flees.
37	11	"...And the Beast from the Sea"	Michael Rymer	Steve Lightfoot and Bryan Fuller	August 13, 2015 (Canada); August 15, 2015 (U.S.)	311	1.03
Will informs Jack and Alana that Hannibal is likely talking to Dolarhyde, as he mentioned the paintings. Dolarhyde admits his fear of killing Reba to Hannibal, who gives him the Grahams's address to satiate the Dragon. He takes film of Molly and her son Walter and later watches it with Reba, who is unable to see the contents. He attacks them at night, but they escape despite Molly being shot, and when Will arrives at the hospital, Walter asks him to kill Dolarhyde. Dolarhyde breaks up with Reba to stop himself from hurting her. Having called Hannibal's real attorney, Alana informs Hannibal that she knows he is talking to Dolarhyde. She and Jack monitor their next call, and when Dolarhyde again mentions his fears about Reba, Hannibal informs him that the call is unsafe. Alana strips his cell of ameneties as punishment. Will confronts him and he admits that he sent Dolarhyde after his family, and Will realizes that he is pushing Dolarhyde further into his Dragon personality, who "changes" his victims.
38	12	"The Number of the Beast Is 666"	Guillermo Navarro	Jeff Vlaming & Angela Lamanna and Bryan Fuller & Steve Lightfoot	August 20, 2015 (Canada); August 22, 2015 (U.S.)	312	0.79
Now in therapy with Du Maurier, Will admits he has been seeing himself murdering Molly as the Dragon, while she confirms that Hannibal is in love with him and asks if he feels the same. Will plans to stage an interview with Lounds where he disparages Dolarhyde in hopes of drawing him out, and Chilton is roped in when he meets with Hannibal about his article. In response, Dolarhyde abducts Chilton, but is briefly interrupted by Reba stopping by in an attempt to make amends. After she leaves, he forces Chilton to observe photos of his murders and the paintings, before making him record a video where he promises Dolarhyde's retribution against Will will be harsher. Dolarhyde then bites Chilton's lips off and mails them to Hannibal, one of which he eats, before burning Chilton alive. Will is unnerved by the video, wondering to Du Maurier if he marked Chilton for death by placing his hand on his shoulder in a photo taken for the interview. He visits a severely disfigured Chilton, who mentions seeing Reba. Dolarhyde abducts her and informs her of his crimes as the Dragon.
39	13	"The Wrath of the Lamb"	Michael Rymer	Bryan Fuller & Steve Lightfoot & Nick Antosca	August 27, 2015 (Canada); August 29, 2015 (U.S.)	313	1.24
When Reba tries to run, Dolarhyde sets his house on fire and commits suicide to avoid seeing her die, though she manages to escape. After learning Dolarhyde's identity, Will visits Hannibal one last time, stating that he rejected Hannibal at his house knowing that he would turn himself in. Dolarhyde, having faked his death by killing another man, attacks Will, who suggests that he "change" Hannibal for manipulating them both. Will presents a plan to Jack and Alana to stage Hannibal's escape to lure out Dolarhyde, though he tells a disgusted Du Maurier that he would allow Hannibal to escape if necessary. Hannibal agrees to the plan after Will asks him personally, only for Dolarhyde to kill his guards during the fake escape, allowing Hannibal to take Will to the cliffside house he kept Abigail and Miriam Lass in. As Will accepts that he may die helping Hannibal, Dolarhyde attacks and wounds them both, and they kill him together in a brutal struggle. Hannibal tells Will that "this is all I ever wanted for you" and Will admits that "it's beautiful" before embracing him and pulling them off a cliff, leaving their fates unknown. A post-credits scene shows Du Maurier, her leg amputated and cooked, waiting apprehensively at a table set for three.

== Production ==
=== Development ===
On May 9, 2014, NBC renewed the series for a third season. In July 2014, Robert Greenblatt, Chairman of NBC Entertainment, commented positively on the season's scripts although he said, "we still struggle to find an audience for it. It's great, we're keeping it going, we keep trying to build an audience for it. But, if this were on a cable network the small audience would not matter. It would be deemed more successful than it is on our network. [...] The minute you try and do something that is dark, and subversive, and frightening, and gets into that territory, you start to peel away the mass audience. It's just the way it is. Because the quality of that show is undeniable."

=== Writing ===
After the first season ended, Fuller stated that he planned for the show to run for seven seasons with the third season consisting of new material, while the fourth season would adapt Red Dragon. But after the second-season finale, Fuller changed plans, intending for the series to last six seasons while restructuring the material. He explained, "we are on track with the original plan with the one exception of condensing what was to have been Season 3 and Season 4 all into one season now. So, the first half of the season will have its finale that reaches a climax and wraps up that story in a great way, and then we start a new story, and then that will have its own climax at the end of the season. Two separate stories that'll have two finales and so you get two seasons for the price of one." He later confirmed that Francis Dolarhyde would make his debut in the eighth episode, which will then allow them to adapt Red Dragon in the fourth season.

According to Fuller, the repercussions of the second-season finale would not be revealed on the premiere, which he said would focus on Hannibal Lecter and Bedelia Du Maurier. He said the fate of the characters would be revealed in "episode 2 or 3." He also explained, "the entire first half of the season is relatively FBI-light. It's all about the pursuit of Hannibal." In October 2014, Fuller confirmed that the second half of the season would adapt the plot of Red Dragon, remarking that deviations from the novel would happen as it was already adapted on Manhunter and Red Dragon, "if we do the same thing, we're a–holes."

=== Casting ===
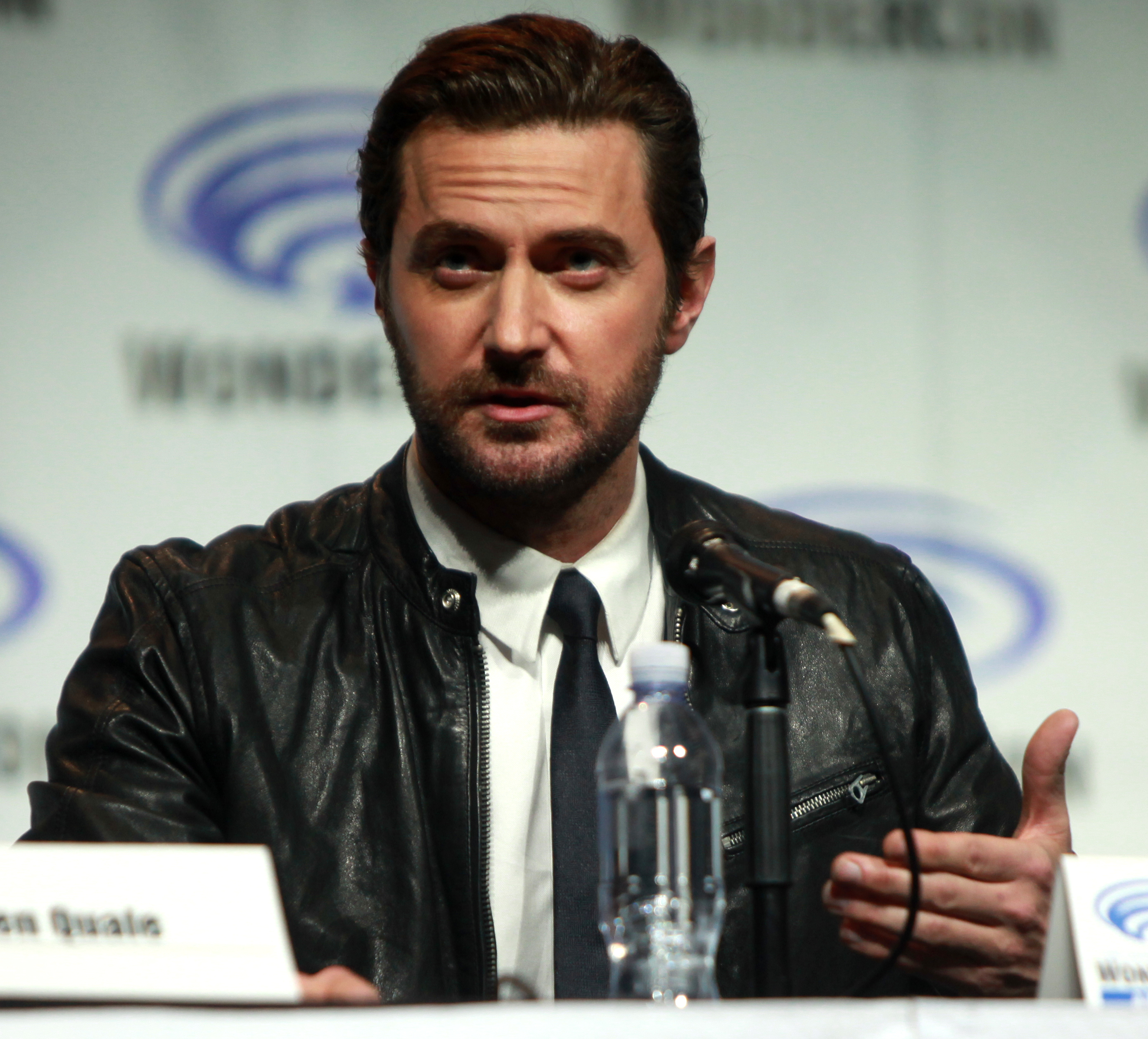
Richard Armitage (pictured in 2014) played Francis Dolarhyde, the main antagonist of the second half of the season.

At the 2014 San Diego Comic-Con, Fuller confirmed that Eddie Izzard would return as Abel Gideon for the season premiere in a flashback sequence as well as stating that Raúl Esparza would return as Frederick Chilton. He also confirmed that the season would introduce many characters from the novels Hannibal and Hannibal Rising, including Rinaldo Pazzi, Lady Murasaki and Dr. Cordell Doemling. In September 2014, Laurence Fishburne confirmed that despite his commitment to Black-ish, he would return as Jack Crawford in the third season. That same month, Gillian Anderson was announced to be upped to series regular.

In October 2014, Tao Okamoto was announced to play Lady Murasaki, "who possesses an alluring and classical beauty with a dark secret." However, Fuller clarified that Okamoto would play Chiyoh, Lady Murasaki's attendant. The season also introduced Will Graham's wife, Molly, in the eighth episode, with Nina Arianda joining the series in January 2015. Soon, Glenn Fleshler joined to play Dr. Cordell Doemling, "the personal doctor to a disfigured Mason Verger, quiet, very intelligent, and definitely creepy."

In March 2015, Zachary Quinto was announced to guest star as Neal Frank, "a patient of Bedelia Du Maurier."

In July 2014, Fuller confirmed that Francis Dolarhyde would make his debut in the eighth episode and serve as the main antagonist of the second half of the season. In January 2015, Richard Armitage was announced to play Dolarhyde, "a serial killer with a set of chompers that would make the Big Bad Wolf a little envious — and a penchant for targeting entire households for slaughter." A few days later, Rutina Wesley joined to play Reba McClane, "a blind woman who catches the eye of Francis Dolarhyde — AKA The Tooth Fairy — and represents his best chance at humanity."

In December 2014, it was announced that Michael Pitt chose not to return to play Mason Verger, being replaced by Joe Anderson. In February 2015, Gina Torres confirmed she would return as Bella Crawford.

=== Filming ===
The season started filming on October 20, 2014, in Toronto, and some filming of exterior and interior scenes were shot in Florence, Italy and Palermo.

== Release ==
=== Broadcast ===
Like the previous seasons, the season was intended as a mid-season replacement, although the season was omitted from the NBC schedule by December 2014. In January 2015, NBC confirmed that the season would premiere in summer 2015. In March 2015, NBC officially announced that the season would premiere on June 4, 2015, airing Thursdays at 10:00 pm, the same timeslot as the first season.

Following the series' cancellation, NBC announced that starting with the seventh episode, "Digestivo", the rest of the season would move to Saturdays at 10:00 pm.

=== Marketing ===
On July 24, 2014, part of the cast and crew attended the 2014 San Diego Comic-Con to promote the season. The first teaser premiered in January 2015. In October 2014, the cast and crew attended the 2014 New York PaleyFest. In June 2015, Fuller attended the 2015 ATX Television Festival to promote the season and show a sneak peek of the second episode, "Primavera".

After the series' cancellation, the cast and crew attended the 2015 San Diego Comic-Con on July 11, 2015. The panel included a sneak peek of the second half of the season, as well as to give the audience an update on the series' possible continuation.

=== Home media release ===
The season was released on Blu-ray and DVD in region 1 on December 8, 2015.

On June 5, 2020, the season was available for streaming on Netflix. It exited the service on June 4, 2021.

== Reception ==
=== Viewers ===
Viewership and ratings per episode of Hannibal season 3
No.	Title	Air date	Rating/share (18–49)	Viewers (millions)	DVR (18–49)	DVR viewers (millions)	Total (18–49)	Total viewers (millions)
1	"Antipasto"	June 4, 2015	0.7/2	2.57	0.3	0.99	1.0	3.56
2	"Primavera"	June 11, 2015	0.5/2	1.66	0.3	—N/a	0.8	—N/a
3	"Secondo"	June 18, 2015	0.5/2	1.69	0.3	0.62	0.8	2.30
4	"Aperitivo"	June 25, 2015	0.4/1	1.46	0.2	0.55	0.6	2.01
5	"Contorno"	July 2, 2015	0.4/1	1.23	0.2	0.52	0.6	1.75
6	"Dolce"	July 9, 2015	0.4/1	1.38	0.2	—N/a	0.6	—N/a
7	"Digestivo"	July 18, 2015	0.3/1	0.97	0.2	0.47	0.5	1.45
8	"The Great Red Dragon"	July 25, 2015	0.3/1	0.96	0.2	0.47	0.5	1.43
9	"...And the Woman Clothed with the Sun"	August 1, 2015	0.3/1	1.02	0.2	0.50	0.5	1.52
10	"...And the Woman Clothed in Sun"	August 8, 2015	0.3/1	1.01	0.1	—N/a	0.4	—N/a
11	"...And the Beast from the Sea"	August 15, 2015	0.3/1	1.03	0.1	—N/a	0.4	—N/a
12	"The Number of the Beast Is 666"	August 22, 2015	0.2/1	0.79	0.1	—N/a	0.3	—N/a
13	"The Wrath of the Lamb"	August 29, 2015	0.3/1	1.24	0.2	0.47	0.5	1.71

=== Critical reviews ===
On Rotten Tomatoes, the season has an approval rating of 98% with an average rating of 8.9/10 based on 47 reviews. The site's consensus reads: "Bryan Fuller serves up another delightfully demented season of Hannibal, featuring a hearty helping of gorgeous gore, paired with a sweet side of twisted humor." On Metacritic, the season has a score of 84 out of 100 based on 15 reviews.

Joshua Rivera of Business Insider stated that "Hannibal is a show that puts all of its chips on the table, blows up that table, and then builds something even more fascinating from what remains", and hailed it as one of the best shows on television. Dominic Patten of Deadline Hollywood also gave the first few episodes positive reviews also stating the show returns better than ever. The acting of Mads Mikkelsen and Gillian Anderson was particularly praised, with Bloody Disgusting writing, "Gillian Anderson's performance pushes Mads Mikkelsen in ways never thought possible", while also giving praise to creator and writer Bryan Fuller saying he creates "meticulously detailed scripts that define his characters in completely unpredictable ways". The review concludes by stating season 3 "re-establishes Hannibal as the best horror show on television". Chris Cabin of Slant Magazine gave it a very positive review, with four out of five, and wrote that season 3 is "even more incisively and ambitiously written than the last season, and sporting the most radically expressive imagery currently on television". Jeff Jensen of Entertainment Weekly rated it an "A−" and wrote, "Hannibal remains the most engrossing (and gross) serial-killer drama on television, and the most beautiful."

==== Critics' top ten lists ====
The season appeared in many "Best of 2015" lists, becoming the 12th most mentioned series in the lists.

2015
- No. 1 ScreenCrush
- No. 1 Slant
- No. 1 Vulture
- No. 3 IGN
- No. 3 Time Out New York
- No. 3 We Got This Covered
- No. 4 Digital Spy
- No. 4 Rapid City Journal
- No. 7 The A.V. Club
- No. 7 Cinema Blend
- No. 7 Entertainment Weekly
- No. 7 RogerEbert.com
- No. 9 Thompson on Hollywood
- No. 10 The Playlist
- – Criticwire
- – Flavorwire
- – Variety
- – The Week
- – Wired

=== Awards and accolades ===
Year	Award	Category	Nominee(s)	Result
2016	Critics' Choice Television Awards	Best Drama Actor	Hugh Dancy	Nominated
2016	Critics' Choice Television Awards	Best Guest Performer in a Drama Series	Richard Armitage	Nominated
2016	IGN Awards	Best TV Series		Nominated
2016	IGN Awards	Best TV Horror Series		Won
2016	IGN Awards	Best TV Villain	Richard Armitage	Won
2016	IGN Awards	Best TV Episode	"The Wrath of the Lamb"	Won
2016	Fangoria Chainsaw Awards 2016	Best TV Series		Nominated
2016	Fangoria Chainsaw Awards 2016	Best TV Actor	Hugh Dancy	Nominated
2016	Fangoria Chainsaw Awards 2016	Best TV Actor	Mads Mikkelsen	Nominated
2016	Fangoria Chainsaw Awards 2016	Best TV Actress	Caroline Dhavernas	Nominated
2016	Fangoria Chainsaw Awards 2016	Best TV Supporting Actor	Richard Armitage	Won
2016	Fangoria Chainsaw Awards 2016	Best TV Supporting Actress	Gillian Anderson	Won
2016	Fangoria Chainsaw Awards 2016	Best TV Makeup/Creature FX	Francois Dagenais	Nominated
2016	Saturn Awards	Best Action-Thriller Television Series		Won
2016	Saturn Awards	Best Actor on Television	Mads Mikkelsen	Nominated
2016	Saturn Awards	Best Supporting Actor on Television	Richard Armitage	Won
2016	Saturn Awards	Best Supporting Actress on Television	Gillian Anderson	Nominated
2016	Emmy Awards	Outstanding Special Visual Effects	"Primavera"	Nominated
2017	Saturn Awards	Best Television DVD Release	The Complete Series Collection	Won
