= Antipasto (Hannibal) =

- Hannibal episode
- Episode no.: Season 3 Episode 1
- Directed by: Vincenzo Natali
- Written by: Bryan Fuller; Steve Lightfoot
- Cinematography by: James Hawkinson
- Editing by: Michael Doherty
- Production code: 301
- Original air date: June 4, 2015
- Running time: 43 minutes

Guest appearances
- Eddie Izzard as Dr. Abel Gideon (special guest star); Tom Wisdom as Antony Dimmond; Rinaldo Rocco as Sogliato; Jeremy Crutchley as Dr. Roman Fell; Zachary Quinto as Neal Frank; Catherine Tait as Mrs. Fell; Toni Ellwand as Mrs. Albizzi; David Calderisi as Mr. Albizzi

Episode chronology
← Previous "Mizumono"	Next → "Primavera"
- Hannibal season 3

"Antipasto" is the first episode of the third season of the psychological thriller–horror series Hannibal. It is the 27th overall episode of the series and was written by series creator Bryan Fuller and executive producer Steve Lightfoot, and directed by Vincenzo Natali. It was first broadcast on June 4, 2015, on NBC.

The series is based on characters and elements appearing in Thomas Harris' novels Red Dragon and Hannibal, with focus on the relationship between FBI special investigator Will Graham (Hugh Dancy) and Dr. Hannibal Lecter (Mads Mikkelsen), a forensic psychiatrist destined to become Graham's most cunning enemy. The episode revolves around Hannibal Lecter and Bedelia Du Maurier in Europe, posing as Dr. Roman Fell and his wife after Lecter killed them. When a person who knows Fell seems to suspect something, Bedelia begins to feel uncertain about her role with Lecter as he puts in danger their cover. Throughout the episode, flashbacks are shown through certain events impacting Lecter's and Maurier's lives. The episode only features main cast members Mads Mikkelsen and Gillian Anderson, tying with the next episode for the episode with the fewest cast members. With his appearance, Mikkelsen is the only actor to appear in every single episode of the series.

According to Nielsen Media Research, the episode was seen by an estimated 2.57 million household viewers and gained a 0.7/2 ratings share among adults aged 18–49. The episode received mostly positive reviews from critics, who praised Mikkelsen and Anderson, the directing and cinematography, although some felt mixed on the episode's slow pace and lack of answers from the cliffhanger.

== Plot ==
=== Flashbacks ===
On the night that he ate his leg, Abel Gideon (Eddie Izzard) converses with Lecter (Mads Mikkelsen), viewing him as a form of Devil. They then discuss the idea behind cannibalism, with Lecter remarking that it "is only cannibalism if we're equals." Later, he shows how he severed his arm in order to enhance the flavor and Gideon notes that just like him, Lecter will also be eaten eventually.

After being interviewed by the FBI, Bedelia Du Maurier (Gillian Anderson) finds Lecter taking a shower at her house. Lecter explains his failure with Will Graham and how it appears that he struggled.

In another flashback, Bedelia wakes up from a session to discover she killed Neal Frank (Zachary Quinto), a violent patient referred from Lecter. Lecter arrives and notes the level of aggression committed at the scene. He offers to help Bedelia with the scene and how to tell the story.

=== Present day ===
In Paris, a man on a motorcycle travels throughout the city until he stops at a party. The man is revealed to be Lecter, who is interested in a man, Dr. Roman Fell (Jeremy Crutchley). Another person at the party, Antony Dimmond (Tom Wisdom) salutes Lecter, and they exchange a conversation regarding Fell with Dimmond mocking Fell, as he previously was his teaching assistant. Fell leaves the party and Lecter follows him to his house, with Fell recognizing him from the party. He kills him, and when Fell's wife returns home, he kills her and eats both of them.

Lecter and Bedelia are now in Florence, posing as Fell and his wife. During a party, they are approached by Professor Sogliato (Rinaldo Rocco), who mocks Lecter's knowledge of Dante Alighieri, prompting Lecter to recite Dante's first sonnet, La Vita Nuova. At their apartment, Bedelia wonders if he would kill and eat Sogliato but Lecter wants to protect his cover. The next day, Lecter walks through the Palazzo Capponi and is surprised to find Dimmond there. Even though it may risk his identity, he invites Dimmond to dine with him and Bedelia. During dinner, Dimmond notes that Bedelia's meal consists of the exact ingredients that Lecter fed to Gideon to "enhance the flavor". Lecter invites Dimmond to a lecture that "Fell" will make at the Studiolo of Francesco I, surprising Bedelia.

Dimmond attends the lecture, seeing Lecter as "Fell" giving his presentation, with Bedelia in attendance. Lecter even addresses Dimmond among the crowd, prompting a shaken Bedelia to leave. After the lecture, Sogliato is impressed and Dimmond does not disclose Lecter's facade. After Sogliato leaves, he confronts Lecter about Fell's whereabouts. He invites Dimmond to his apartment to explain, just as Bedelia appeared to plan to escape. She then sees Lecter murder Dimmond and questions whether she is observing or participating. She says she was curious, prompting both to conclude she was participating by not interfering and deducing what would happen.

Lecter boards a train to an unknown destination, remembering Gideon's conversation about being caught. Lecter then makes an origami heart out of the Vitruvian Man reproduction. The episode ends with the revelation that Lecter made a human origami with Dimmond's torso to make it appear as a heart, displaying it at a chapel.

== Production ==
=== Development ===
In September 2014, Bryan Fuller announced that the first episode of the season would be titled "Antipasto". In March 2015, Fuller announced that Vincenzo Natali would direct the episode. NBC would confirm the title in May 2015, with Fuller and executive producer Steve Lightfoot writing the episode and Natali directing. This was Fuller's 22nd writing credit, Lightfoot's 12th writing credit, and Natali's third directing credit.

=== Writing ===
Fuller said that the episode would serve as a "pilot for a new series" and would answer "why she [Bedelia] was on that plane, what is her agenda, and how she fits into the bigger story." He also said that the episode wouldn't solve the cliffhanger of the previous season, with the episode focusing on Hannibal Lecter and Bedelia Du Maurier.

=== Casting ===
At the 2014 San Diego Comic-Con, Fuller confirmed that Eddie Izzard would return as Abel Gideon for the season premiere in a flashback sequence, which they were already in the process of writing at the time. In March 2015, Zachary Quinto was announced to guest star as Neal Frank, "a patient of Bedelia Du Maurier."

In September 2014, it was announced that Gillian Anderson would be upped to series regular, starting with the episode.

== Reception ==
=== Viewers ===
The episode was watched by 2.57 million viewers, earning a 0.7/2 in the 18–49 rating demographics on the Nielsen ratings scale. This means that 0.7 percent of all households with televisions watched the episode, while 2 percent of all households watching television at that time watched it. This was a 9% increase from the previous episode, which was watched by 2.35 million viewers with a 0.8/3 in the 18-49 demographics. But it was a 22% decrease from the previous season premiere, which was watched by 3.27 million viewers with a 1.1/4 in the 18-49 demographics. With these ratings, Hannibal ranked second on its timeslot and eleventh for the night in the 18-49 demographics, behind Aquarius, a Mom rerun, Wayward Pines, a Mike & Molly rerun, Dateline NBC, Bones, Jimmy Kimmel Live! Game Night, a The Odd Couple rerun, a The Big Bang Theory rerun, and the first game of the 2015 NBA Finals.

With DVR factored, the episode was watched by 3.56 million viewers with a 1.0 on the 18-49 demo.

=== Critical reviews ===
"Antipasto" received mostly positive reviews from critics. Eric Goldman of IGN gave the episode a "great" 8.5 out of 10 and wrote in his verdict: "The Hannibal: Season 3 premiere dived deep on the show's more quiet and dreamlike qualities, while giving us a lot to examine about Hannibal and Bedelia's dynamic – and many signs that Bedelia is a darker person than she's even admitted to herself. While I'm as anxious as everyone else to see what happened to Will and the others, Hannibal himself remains a fascinating character and even without Will physically being there, his presence was felt. 'Will Graham was not a suitable substitute for therapy' remarked Hannibal, even as we know Hannibal once hoped he would be."

Molly Eichel of The A.V. Club gave the episode an "A−" and wrote, "'Antipasto' is one of Hannibal's more dreamy episodes, playing with temporality and dreamscape in ways that few other shows even attempt. It's a beautiful episode that answers many questions about Bedelia and Hannibal's relationship, while bringing up so many more. For a show that ended its last season in a cliffhanger, few of the basic questions are left untouched. Who made it out of last season's bloodbath? But Hannibal is rarely concerned with those basic facts. This is a world, remember, where a frail old man can construct a totem pole made of corpses with no help from anyone more able-bodied and a murderer can sit down for dinner with a man he killed long ago to have a conversation about his very nature. Instead, it is more concerned with creating a feeling. And in 'Antipasto', that feeling is terror."

Alan Sepinwall of HitFix wrote, "A strong start to the season, but brace yourself for a whole lot of craziness next week." Mark Rozeman of Paste gave the episode a 9 out of 10 and wrote, "'Antipasto' stands as the most insular entry in the history of the series, thus making it an odd choice for a season premiere. Indeed, despite the wealth of riches inherent in this set-up, the only drawback to this approach is that very little in terms of plot-related significance truly occurs in this hour — though, to be fair, Hannibal has recently treated traditional narrative structure more as a flexible series of check points than a meticulously constructed roadway." Jeff Stone of IndieWire gave the episode an "A−" and wrote, "A good deal of this episode is dedicated to Bedelia, whose motivations last season were rather opaque, in part due to her sporadic appearances. Now that Anderson is a series regular, we see that she’s not necessarily the partner in crime last season’s epilogue might have led viewers to believe."

Brian Moylan of The Guardian wrote, "The premiere of Hannibal seemed so darkly assured of itself, even though the audience has no idea where it's going." Keith Staskiewicz of Entertainment Weekly wrote, "It's a little hard to recap a show like Hannibal because a play-by-play of an episode's plot points would be about as good a representation of the experience of watching the episode as a list of its props. It breaks away from decades of television tradition as a writers' medium, as one whose virtues are based mainly in dialogue and narrative, as a filmed successor to the radio serial whose story one can still follow even while occupied with laundry or paying bills."

Kayti Burt of Den of Geek gave the episode a 4 star rating out of 5 and wrote, "Hannibal may have rebooted its story with this tale of Hannibal in Europe, but, stylistically, it is the same show. We are treated to the same slow-motion reveries that continually challenge the line between objectivity and subjectivity, between reality and fantasy." Nick McHatton of TV Fanatic gave the episode a 4 star rating out of 5 and wrote, "Hannibal Season 3 didn't exactly start off with a bang as it did last year, but I'm intrigued enough by what we were shown (and what we weren't shown) to have enjoyed the premiere fully." Emma Dibdin of Digital Spy wrote, "'Antipasto' feels like Hannibal casting off its old skin right along with its protagonist – the FBI is gone, Virginia is gone, and most of the regular cast are absent, leaving only Hannibal and Bedelia and their elliptical, paranoid psychological dance through Europe."

Adam Lehrer of Forbes wrote, "'Antipasto' was an excellent first episode for the third season. Though it leaves many questions open about last season's finale, it set up the fascinating relationship between Hannibal and Bedelia. Hannibal has moved on from Will's betrayal, at least in appearances. Now it's time for us to move on as well." Britt Hayes of ScreenCrush wrote, "It cannot be stated enough how gorgeous this episode was — perhaps the most artistic one to date. Natali and Fuller really indulged in their creative sensibilities, and I hope it's just a, um, taste of what's to come."
