= Secondo (Hannibal) =

- Hannibal episode
- Episode no.: Season 3 Episode 3
- Directed by: Vincenzo Natali
- Written by: Angelina Burnett; Bryan Fuller; Steve Lightfoot
- Cinematography by: James Hawkinson
- Editing by: Ben Wilkinson
- Production code: 303
- Original air date: June 18, 2015
- Running time: 44 minutes

Guest appearances
- Rinaldo Rocco as Sogliato; Fortunato Cerlino as Rinaldo Pazzi; Tao Okamoto as Chiyoh; Julian Richings as Caged Man; David Calderisi as Signore Albizzi; Toni Ellwand as Mrs. Albizzi

Episode chronology
| ← Previous "Primavera" | Next → "Aperitivo" |
- Hannibal season 3

"Secondo" is the third episode of the third season of the psychological thriller–horror series Hannibal. It is the 29th overall episode of the series and was written by producer Angelina Burnett, series creator Bryan Fuller, and executive producer Steve Lightfoot and directed by Vincenzo Natali. It was first broadcast on June 18, 2015, on NBC.

The series is based on characters and elements appearing in Thomas Harris' novels Red Dragon and Hannibal, with focus on the relationship between FBI special investigator Will Graham (Hugh Dancy) and Dr. Hannibal Lecter (Mads Mikkelsen), a forensic psychiatrist destined to become Graham's most cunning enemy. The episode revolves around Will Graham travelling to Hannibal Lecter's childhood home in Lithuania in order to discover more about him. There, he discovers a woman that makes some revelations about Lecter's sister.

According to Nielsen Media Research, the episode was seen by an estimated 1.69 million household viewers and gained a 0.5/2 ratings share among adults aged 18–49. The episode received generally positive reviews from critics, who praised the episode's visual style and Natali's directing, but critics also expressed discomfort with the episode's slow pace.

== Plot ==
At his residence in Florence, Lecter (Mads Mikkelsen) has a conversation with Bedelia (Gillian Anderson), who feels concerned about his actions and worries that he might get caught, although Lecter deduces she is actually worried about herself.

In Aukštaitija, Lithuania, Graham (Hugh Dancy) sneaks into Lecter's old and seemingly abandoned estate. He imagines himself having a therapy session with Lecter on the grounds of the estate. Then he finds a woman (Tao Okamoto) hunting with a shotgun at the estate. At night, Graham ventures into a basement where he discovers a man (Julian Richings) caged in a cell and is discovered by the woman. The woman states that the man in the cage killed and ate Lecter's younger sister Mischa and has been the subject of psychological and mental torture for years. The woman is named Chiyoh and she attended Lecter's aunt. She didn't let Lecter kill his sister's murderer and she has guarded him for years.

Lecter and Bedelia invite Sogliato (Rinaldo Rocco) for dinner, where Lecter suddenly kills him by stabbing him with an ice pick in the head. As Sogliato laughs, Bedelia removes the ice pick, causing him to drop dead, with Lecter noting that she technically killed him. They later question Lecter's intentions and thoughts about Graham and the influence on himself. Crawford (Laurence Fishburne) is revealed to be alive and arriving at Florence, meeting with Pazzi (Fortunato Cerlino). They find similarities on Dimmond's mutilation compared to other murders committed by Lecter.

Not believing that the man killed Mischa, Graham releases the man from the cage. The man then attacks Chiyoh, forcing her to kill him. She realizes that Graham knew this would happen, and he wanted to prove that she is just part of Lecter's manipulation. With the man dead, she decides to leave the estate, joining Graham on his quest to find Lecter. Graham then displays the man's corpse in the chamber to make it look like a dragonfly. Bedelia later questions Lecter about his past, deducing that while he didn't kill Mischa, he ate her to "forgive her" for influencing him to "betray" himself. Lecter notes that in order to forgive Graham, he must eat him.

== Production ==
=== Development ===
In October 2014, Bryan Fuller announced that the second episode of the season would be titled "Primavera". In March 2015, Fuller announced that Vincenzo Natali would direct the episode. NBC would confirm the title in May 2015, with producer Angelina Burnett, Fuller and executive producer Steve Lightfoot writing the episode and Natali directing. This was Fuller's 24th writing credit, Burnett's first writing credit, Lightfoot's 13th writing credit, and Natali's fifth directing credit.

=== Writing ===
According to Fuller, the repercussions of the second-season finale would not be revealed until "episode 2 or 3." The episode reveals Jack Crawford's fate, revealing he survived his wounds. In September 2014, Laurence Fishburne confirmed that despite his commitment to Black-ish, he would return as Crawford on the third season.

=== Casting ===
At the 2014 San Diego Comic-Con, Fuller confirmed that Lady Murasaki would make her debut in the episode. In October 2014, Tao Okamoto was announced to play Lady Murasaki, "who possesses an alluring and classical beauty with a dark secret." However, Fuller clarified that Okamoto would play Chiyoh, Lady Murasaki's attendant.

== Reception ==
=== Viewers ===
The episode was watched by 1.69 million viewers, earning a 0.5/2 in the 18-49 rating demographics on the Nielsen ratings scale. This means that 0.5 percent of all households with televisions watched the episode, while 2 percent of all households watching television at that time watched it. This was a slight increase from the previous episode, which was watched by 1.66 million viewers with a 0.5/2 in the 18-49 demographics. With these ratings, Hannibal ranked third on its timeslot and eleventh for the night in the 18-49 demographics, behind the 2015 U.S. Open Golf Tournament, Aquarius, Elementary rerun, Mistresses, a rerun of The Odd Couple, a Mom rerun, The Astronaut Wives Club, a Mike & Molly rerun, Dateline NBC, and a The Big Bang Theory rerun.

With DVR factored, the episode was watched by 2.30 million viewers with a 0.8 on the 18-49 demo.

=== Critical reviews ===
"Secondo" received generally positive reviews from critics. Eric Goldman of IGN gave the episode a "great" 8.5 out of 10 and wrote in his verdict: "One by one, we're finding out what happened to everyone after last season, and this week it was Jack's turn. But unlike the more specifically focused installments in the first two episodes, this time out we followed Jack as he met up with Rinaldo, Will as he traveled to Hannibal's childhood home and Hannibal and Bedelia as they continued to prove to be one lethal couple. With this many players now all overseas, it seems we're ripe for them to come to a collision – one Hannibal is now actively seeking out. Since the show began, he was trying to connect with Will, and I suppose that's what he still wants to do – but this time, it's by eating him. Watch out, Will."

Molly Eichel of The A.V. Club gave the episode an "A−" and wrote, "What's so impressive about 'Secondo' is it allows the show to take us back into Lecter's past, back to his origin, but refuses to give the audience, or Hannibal, an easy out. Hannibal was never a victim. He was always in control. So thoroughly in control, in fact, that he's used this explanation of his tragic childhood to control the lives of others."

Alan Sepinwall of HitFix wrote, "'Secondo' was definitely at the extreme end of the show's fuzzy new normal. It's the first Hannibal episode in a while to make me impatient through some of the dream sequences and other macabre imagery (this season loves extreme close-ups of snails in motion), particularly during Will's visit to the rundown Lecter family estate in Lithuania." Mark Rozeman of Paste gave the episode an 8.1 out of 10 and wrote, "Overall, 'Secondo' is an episode with a lot of promise, but little pay-off. Again, the information presented here could all prove to be essential down the line, but it comes across as little more than a beautifully crafted fodder entry. Of course, like the majority of latter day Hannibal episodes, there may very well be dense layers of meaning that will become clearer after a second viewing. As of now, it hopefully represents the odd ball in a season that has, so far, proven to be exceptional." Jeff Stone of IndieWire gave the episode a "C+" and wrote, "I removed the “wonderfully” from the title, since this episode is basically an unsubtle moment in its entirety. Hannibal, as a show, is a really delicate balancing act. It's over-the-top as a general rule, and with its lingering close-ups, often half-baked philosophizing, and grandiose murder tableaus, it's to the creative staff's credit that the show doesn't more often dissolve into kitsch."

Brian Moylan of The Guardian wrote, "The most intoxicating aspect of Hannibal has always been the creepy atmosphere, the shrieking score, and the swamps of blood that the characters are wading through in a bleak landscape. This episode was a little bit more Gothic allure than it was substance, but I'll take being bewitched by an episode of Hannibal than most other shows anyday." Keith Staskiewicz of Entertainment Weekly wrote, "A true communion. Hannibal comes to the inevitable realization that the only way he can truly forgive Will is to eat him, an act that's for once not out of dominance, but pure terrifying love." Chuck Bowen of Slant Magazine wrote, "This is all growing rather fussily symbolic, occasionally bordering on the tedious, as parallels upon parallels are affixed to the primary thread existing between the leads."

Kayti Burt of Den of Geek gave the episode a 3 star rating out of 5 and wrote, "Like Hannibal Lecter, 'Secondo' entrances, but doesn't create a cohesive or compelling narrative in the same way the season's first two installments — which focused entirely on Hannibal and Will's post-season two states-of-mind, respectively — did. Still, who can turn away from a show this gorgeously shot, acted, and written? Not me." Nick McHatton of TV Fanatic gave the episode a 4.25 star rating out of 5 and wrote, "The visuals, again. I loved the shattered glass theme that went through the show, including the breaking ice that make the Titanic cocktail. My favorite this time was the shattered glass distorted view of Hannibal's American home, as Will imagined Hannibal's memory palace." Emma Dibdin of Digital Spy wrote, "Whether or not we entirely believe him is a different story, but it's certainly true that this episode humanises Hannibal without remotely trying to explain him. 'Secondo' sees Will going back to the Lecter family's roots in Lithuania, examining Hannibal's childhood home 'to measure where and if he's broken', but what he finds out makes Hannibal seem, if anything, even more monstrous than ever."

Adam Lehrer of Forbes wrote, "Director Vincenzo Natali, who also directed the premiere 'Antipaso,' has done a stunning job of shooting these episodes. Much like his underrated film The Cube, Hannibal takes place in the mind; not so much in dreams, but in motivations. In perspectives. But at the same time he delivers us classic horror, when Will displayed the old man's head on a cross at the end, I was reminded of the horrific flair displayed by Dario Argento's giallo horror classics like Tenebrae, in which horror is given an erotic allure." Britt Hayes of ScreenCrush wrote, "Acceptance, understanding, forgiveness... betrayal. These are necessary components in every relationship — they are not always pleasant and not always kind, but without them love is not capable of existing. Just as Will began to understand Hannibal's twisted affection for him with last week's bloody valentine, so does Will begin to understand his own affection for Hannibal this week. Just like any relationship, the results are exceedingly complex."
