= Operation: Endgame =

- Directed by: Fouad Mikati
- Written by: Sam Levinson; Brian Watanabe
- Produced by: Sean McKittrick; Michael Ohoven; Kevin Turen; Richard Kelly
- Starring: Joe Anderson; Rob Corddry; Ellen Barkin; Odette Yustman; Maggie Q; Zach Galifianakis; Adam Scott; Brandon T. Jackson; Emilie de Ravin; Bob Odenkirk; Ving Rhames; Jeffrey Tambor
- Cinematography: Arnaud Stefani
- Edited by: Joshua Ferrazzano
- Music by: Ian Honeyman
- Production companies: Infinity Media; Scion Films; Darko Entertainment
- Distributed by: Anchor Bay Films
- Release date: July 16, 2010 (United States)
- Running time: 87 minutes
- Country: United States
- Language: English

Operation: Endgame is a 2010 black comedy action film directed by Fouad Mikati featuring an ensemble cast. It premiered on November 5, 2009, at the American Film Market and had a limited release in the United States on July 16, 2010. It was released on DVD and Blu-ray Disc on July 27, 2010.

== Plot ==
On January 20, 2009, Barack Obama becomes President of the United States and it is the first day of work for a man known as "The Fool". The Factory, a secret office of government agents, has hired him as a thief. After two agents, High Priestess and Chariot, meet the Fool, they enter the secret underground offices of the Factory.

The Factory is separated into two teams, Alpha and Omega. The two teams specialize in black ops and oppose each other in a bureaucratic system of checks and balances. Omega Team consists of the Fool, Chariot, High Priestess, Judgement, and the Emperor. Alpha Team consists of the Fool's old flame, Temperance, the Empress, Magician, Tower, and Hierophant. The head of the Factory is the Devil. The wildcard of the office is the Hermit, a dangerous assassin with diabetes and occasional irritable bowel syndrome.

Alpha and Omega eventually find that the Devil has been murdered, and that he has initiated Project Endgame, which has trapped both teams underground and triggered a bomb that threatens to destroy the Factory and kill everyone. The agents need to find a way out. They decide to work in pairs with their opposing mirror agents to escape.

While exploring the office, members of Alpha Team begin to murder their Omega Team counterparts: Empress kills Emperor, Hierophant kills Judgement, and Tower kills High Priestess. Chariot then kills Tower, and is almost killed by Magician. In a surveillance room, three people, Neil, Carl, and their boss Susan, watch the carnage between the agents. They all eventually learn that the system has been corrupted, and Susan realizes that the clearance codes have been switched in conjunction with the inauguration.

While trying to find a way out, Fool is attacked by Hierophant. Temperance kills Hierophant, saving Fool. She reveals that Alpha Team was ordered to eliminate Omega Team that very day. The Fool, Chariot and Temperance spend time in Devil's Office trying to find a way of escape. Eventually Devil's Safe is cracked open, a map is found and The Fool steals some discs without anyone else noticing. After this encounter, the trio face off against the remaining members of Alpha. In the ensuing fights, Chariot sets Magician on fire, Hermit kills Chariot and Temperance shoots Hermit in the crotch and then kills Empress. The Fool and Temperance are the only ones left standing. They both enter the exit elevator and escape. They kiss as the bomb goes off, destroying the Factory.

Meanwhile, Carl and Neil uncover an audio tape which the Devil recorded before his death. The Devil reveals that he has a disc with every dirty secret from the last eight years of the Bush administration. He also professes his love for Susan. The elevator emerges from a bathroom stall and it is revealed the Fool has killed Temperance. He snaps the neck of a man in the bathroom who sees Temperance's body and takes his jacket, then he calls Susan, and tells her (in an English accent using the British pronunciation of ma'am as the American sound of "mum") that he has the disc, which contains "every single one of their fuck-ups." Susan reveals that she had hired the Fool specifically to enter the Factory and retrieve the files. She then shoots Carl and Neil. Meanwhile, the Fool walks out of the building, steps into a cab, and drives off.

== Cast ==
- Joe Anderson as Eric Gaines/"Fool"
- Rob Corddry as Tony/"Chariot"
- Ellen Barkin as "Empress"
- Odette Yustman as Cassie/"Temperance"
- Maggie Q as "High Priestess"
- Zach Galifianakis as "Hermit"
- Adam Scott as "Magician"
- Brandon T. Jackson as "Tower"
- Emilie de Ravin as "Hierophant"
- Beth Grant as Susan
- Bob Odenkirk as "Emperor"
- Michael Hitchcock as Neil
- Tim Bagley as Carl
- Ving Rhames as "Judgement"
- Jeffrey Tambor as "Devil"

== Production ==
Filming took place in Los Angeles.

The original screenplay, The Rogues Gallery, was written by Brian Watanabe. The script tied for "Best Comedy" at the Screenwriting Expo 3 Screenwriting Contest and 2nd place at the 1st Screenplay Shootout. It was also a 2004 Scriptapalooza finalist.

== Reception ==
On review aggregator website Rotten Tomatoes, the film holds a score of 40% based on five reviews, with an average rating of 4.4/10.
