= The Wrath of the Lamb =

Series finale of Hannibal

- Hannibal episode
- Episode no.: Season 3 Episode 13
- Directed by: Michael Rymer
- Written by: Bryan Fuller; Steve Lightfoot; Nick Antosca
- Cinematography by: Michael Marshall
- Editing by: Michael Doherty
- Production code: 313
- Original air dates: August 27, 2015 (Canada); August 29, 2015 (U.S.)
- Running time: 43 minutes

Guest appearances
- Richard Armitage as Francis Dolarhyde; Rutina Wesley as Reba McClane; Raúl Esparza as Dr. Frederick Chilton; Katharine Isabelle as Margot Verger; Alana Bridgewater as Orderly

Episode chronology
← Previous "The Number of the Beast Is 666"	Next → —
- Hannibal season 3

"The Wrath of the Lamb" is the series finale of the horror series Hannibal. It is the 13th episode of the third season and is the 39th overall episode of the series. The episode was written by series creator Bryan Fuller, executive producer Steve Lightfoot, and co-producer Nick Antosca, and directed by Michael Rymer. It was first broadcast on August 27, 2015 on Canada, and then August 29, 2015 on NBC.

The series is based on characters and elements appearing in Thomas Harris' novels Red Dragon and Hannibal, with focus on the relationship between FBI special investigator Will Graham (Hugh Dancy) and Dr. Hannibal Lecter (Mads Mikkelsen), a forensic psychiatrist destined to become Graham's most cunning enemy. Throughout the course of the show, the relationship between Graham and Lecter took many drastic turns, from becoming colleagues to enemies. The events of the season involved the capture of Lecter and a new threat, a serial killer named Francis Dolarhyde, also known as "The Tooth Fairy". In the series finale, Graham sets to catch Dolarhyde, using Lecter as a bait to get to him.

According to Nielsen Media Research, the episode was seen by an estimated 1.24 million household viewers and gained a 0.3/1 ratings share among adults aged 18–49. The episode received universal acclaim from critics, who praised nearly every aspect from the episode, including directing, writing, performances, cinematography, music score and final scene. Many deemed that despite the series' cancellation, it was a "satisfying" ending for the series.

== Plot ==
Having kidnapped Reba (Rutina Wesley), Dolarhyde (Richard Armitage) instructs her not to escape. She still tries but is caught by Dolarhyde. He then takes a shotgun and starts spilling gasoline over his house. He lights his house on fire, but unwilling to see Reba die, shoots himself in the head with the shotgun. Having already visited the house, Reba manages to escape but is wounded.

Graham (Hugh Dancy) visits Reba at the hospital, where he deduces that Dolarhyde's love for her made him kill himself. He later visits Lecter (Mads Mikkelsen) at his cell to inform him of Dolarhyde's death. During their conversation, Graham tells Lecter that he intentionally rejected him, knowing that he would turn himself in. He bids Lecter goodbye and leaves. At his hotel room, Graham is attacked by an alive Dolarhyde. Dolarhyde expresses his disappointment for Lecter's betrayal and Graham suggests that he could "change" Lecter like his previous victims.

At BAU, Price (Scott Thompson) and Zeller (Aaron Abrams) inform Graham and Crawford (Laurence Fishburne) that the body retrieved at Dolarhyde's house wasn't his and that he only used it to deceive Reba. Graham plans to use Lecter as bait in order to attract Dolarhyde's attention by a fake escape attempt. He tells Bedelia Du Maurier (Gillian Anderson), who is shocked at his plans. She is even more stunned when Graham informs her that if Lecter escapes, he won't go after him again. Meanwhile, Bloom (Caroline Dhavernas) visits Chilton (Raúl Esparza) at his hyperbaric chamber, and warns him that Graham and Lecter could be the same and she could be manipulated.

Bloom visits Lecter to ask for his cooperation, promising to return his privileges if he helps with catching Dolarhyde. He says that he will only agree on the condition that Graham himself asks him. Graham agrees, but the plan is actually to have both Dolarhyde and Lecter killed. While en route, Dolarhyde crashes all the cars transporting Lecter, killing all the agents transporting him. Lecter and Graham wake up as the sole survivors, spared by Dolarhyde, and flee in a police cruiser. Fearing for her safety and having been threatened by Lecter, Bloom takes Margot (Katharine Isabelle) and their son to escape to a safe place.

Lecter and Graham reach Lecter's cliffside house, which is where Lecter held Abigail Hobbs and Miriam Lass. That night, as they wait for Dolarhyde, they have a conversation until Lecter is shot through the window by Dolarhyde, who then breaks through a window with a silencer. Dolarhyde intends to record Lecter's death while he taunts him. Graham tries to take out his gun but Dolarhyde stabs Graham in the cheek and throws him to the patio. A fight ensues, and they both take turns stabbing Dolarhyde with a knife and an axe until Dolarhyde is dead. Injured with multiple wounds, Lecter and Graham embrace at the cliff’s edge. Lecter tells Graham this is all he ever wanted for them, and Graham replies, "It's beautiful". They continue embracing and Graham leans over the cliff, causing them to fall into the ocean below, their fate unknown.

In a post-credits scene, Bedelia is seen sitting at a table prepared for dinner. The camera reveals that she is about to eat a cooked leg, and Bedelia's own leg appears to have been surgically removed. The table is set for three. Bedelia takes a fork and hides it in her lap as the camera pulls back and the music stops, and the scene cuts to black.

== Production ==
=== Development ===
In April 2015, Steve Lightfoot announced that series creator Bryan Fuller, co-producer Nick Antosca and Lightfoot himself would write the thirteenth episode of the third season, with Michael Rymer directing the episode. In July 2015, the De Laurentiis Entertainment Group announced that the episode would be titled "The Wrath of the Lamb". In August 2015, NBC confirmed that the episode would air on August 29, 2015. This was Fuller's 33rd writing credit, Lightfoot's 21st writing credit, Antosca's third writing credit, and Rymer's ninth directing credit.

== Reception ==
=== Viewers ===
The episode was watched by 1.24 million viewers, earning a 0.3/1 in the 18–49 rating demographics on the Nielson ratings scale. This means that 0.3 percent of all households with televisions watched the episode, while 1 percent of all households watching television at that time watched it. This was a 56% increase from the previous episode, which was watched by 0.79 million viewers with a 0.2/1 in the 18-49 demographics. But it was a 48% decrease from the previous season finale, which was watched by 2.35 million viewers with a 0.8/3 in the 18-49 demographics. With these ratings, Hannibal ranked third on its timeslot and seventh for the night in the 18-49 demographics, behind a Bullseye rerun, a Home Free rerun, an American Ninja Warrior rerun, a Last Man Standing rerun, ABC Saturday Movie of the Week, and a 2015 NFL season game.

With DVR factored, the episode was watched by 1.71 million viewers with a 0.5 on the 18–49 demo.

=== Critical reviews ===
"The Wrath of the Lamb" received universal acclaim from critics. Eric Goldman of IGN gave the episode a perfect "masterpiece" 10 out of 10 and wrote in his verdict: "Those last moments on the cliff were perfect. Perfect. The Siouxsie Sioux song. Hannibal telling Will this is all he ever wanted for them and their embrace... and then Will pulling them off that cliff. It was an extremely romantic moment, in the heightened, horror-tinged way only Hannibal could provide and it paid off the link these two have shared and built upon through the entire series. It also managed to give Will a last moment of heroism, of a sort, in that he's the one who pulls them off that cliff. Hannibal was a killer, after all – in this very episode he made it clear he not only was still a threat to Alana but to her family. Will couldn't just let him go. And as much as he wanted to, he couldn't leave with him either. Because Hannibal would still be Hannibal. But as Bedelia noted, Will was in a 'Can't live with him, can't live without him' situation. And so he ended it for both of them. It was, indeed, beautiful. If we ever get more Hannibal, I'll be ecstatic and excited to see just how Will and Hannibal end up surviving that fall after all and what happens to them next. But if we don't and their story is done? Well, we got one hell of an ending."

Molly Eichel of The A.V. Club gave the episode an "A" and wrote, "While I hope it is not the last we see of Hugh Dancy as Will Graham and Mads Mikkelsen as Hannibal Lecter, it likely is all the same. But 'The Wrath Of The Lamb' acted as a perfect finale for these two characters. Hannibal won't get out to act out his most famous legend, with Clarice Starling and Jame Gumb. Instead, he ends his time on screen in a way that none of us would have expected when this show began: In the arms of the man he loved."

Alan Sepinwall of HitFix wrote, "'The Wrath of the Lamb' was a terrific wrap-up to this telling of the Red Dragon's story, mixing in elements from the source material with new ones particular to this warped love story between cop and killer. The final fight on the cliff, with the three men cutting each other to pieces while Siouxsie Sioux's very James Bond-ian new song 'Love Crime' played gave me goosebumps, even before Dolarhyde was dead and Will wrapped Hannibal in an embrace that made both men look as happy and content as they have at any point in the series." Mark Rozeman of Paste gave the episode a 9.9 out of 10 and wrote, "Both Fuller and his actors moving on to different projects, 'The Wrath of the Lamb' is likely the last we'll be seeing of the Hannibal-verse for some time. And, as devastating as that is for me as a fan, the excellent sense of finality that accompanies the hour's thrilling final sequences makes me feel at peace with this notion." Jeff Stone of IndieWire gave the episode an "A−" and wrote, "So that was Hannibal, a show that seemed like a bad idea on paper but became one of my favorites. It was an easy show to mock, if you were so inclined, because it was so specific and committed to its outsized reality: its ponderous dialogue, its slow-motion close-ups, its unparalleled visuals. That Hannibal aired on network television at all is a miracle; that it lasted three seasons is more than we could have hoped for. It wasn't a perfect show by any means, but it was unlike anything else on television. I will miss it."

Brian Moylan of The Guardian wrote, "Hannibal, though thought dead, still lives inside of the minds and behaviors of everyone he touched. Just as he could still influence events while he was in prison, he still has agency from beyond death. There is no better send off for our anti-hero than that." Keith Staskiewicz of Entertainment Weekly wrote, "If this is indeed it, then I still find myself oddly satisfied." Chuck Bowen of Slant Magazine wrote, "This finale is cluttered and self-conscious, but it evinces a tireless ambition to resist the expectation that a TV series gives its audience the same thing each week."

Greg Cwik of Vulture gave the episode a perfect 5 star rating out of 5 and wrote, "Hannibal, you beautiful, bizarre, beguiling bastard, I'll miss you. Good-bye, Doctor Lecter." Kayti Burt of Den of Geek gave the episode a perfect 5 star rating out of 5 and wrote, "And, though it might have been a perfect ending, that doesn't mean it felt like enough. In an era of ubiquitous adaptations, Hannibal stands apart as the rare example of a story that dared to dream beyond the original. Forget Anthony Hopkins. Mads Mikkelsen is Hannibal Lecter now. And, despite the nightmare-inducing horrors of this fictional world Bryan Fuller has created, I am sad to leave it behind." Robin Harry of TV Fanatic gave the episode a 3.5 star rating out of 5 and wrote, "It just wasn't a GREAT episode, and that's what I was hoping for. It seems even less so when considering that this is the last episode of the show we will ever see. Last season's 'Mizumono' gave us a season finale that left us on the edge of our seat, with surprises and twists. This series finale barely raised my heart rate."

Emma Dibdin of Digital Spy wrote, "I still feel like I'm tempting fate by saying this, but if this really is the last episode of Hannibal I ever get to recap, I'll be sad not only because it's the best show on television, but also because the Fannibals are the best fandom on the internet. I'm going to miss the community around the show as much as the show itself, and I'm sure that everyone involved feels exactly the same way." Adam Lehrer of Forbes wrote, "Wrapping up what may be one of the greatest seasons of television ever recorded, the Hannibal season 3 finale, 'The Wrath of the Lamb', spared no heartbreak, no gasps, and no amount of blood. It was an epic tone poem of a finale." Britt Hayes of ScreenCrush wrote, "'The Wrath of the Lamb' is a fitting farewell for Hannibal, equal parts tone poem and visceral doomed romance, in which the mechanics of the plot pale in comparison to the feelings on display and those it means to elicit."

=== Accolades ===
TVLine named Gillian Anderson the "Performer of the Week" for the week of September 5, 2015, for her performance in the episode. The site wrote, "Through the haze of meds and madness, Anderson allowed us to see the unthinkable — a slight grin emerging on Bedelia's terrified face — after which she reached for a deadly two-pronged fork from her place setting, yet another move on the Hannibal chessboard. The brilliance and beauty of Anderson's finale work made us hope that if, by some long shot, Fuller revives Hannibal at another network or transports it to the big screen, Bedelia Du Maurier will have legs. Or at least one of 'em."
