= Primavera (Hannibal) =

- Hannibal episode
- Episode no.: Season 3 Episode 2
- Directed by: Vincenzo Natali
- Written by: Jeff Vlaming; Bryan Fuller
- Cinematography by: James Hawkinson
- Editing by: Michael Doherty
- Production code: 302
- Original air date: June 11, 2015
- Running time: 44 minutes

Guest appearances
- Fortunato Cerlino as Rinaldo Pazzi; Kacey Rohl as Abigail Hobbs; Anthony Massullo as Poliziotto Lamanna; Davide D'izzia as Inspector Donaggio; Dwight Ireland as Doctor; Paul Sturino as Poliziotto Officer

Episode chronology
← Previous "Antipasto"	Next → "Secondo"
- Hannibal season 3

"Primavera" is the second episode of the third season of the psychological thriller–horror series Hannibal. It is the 28th overall episode of the series and was written by co-executive producer Jeff Vlaming and series creator Bryan Fuller, and directed by Vincenzo Natali. It was first broadcast on June 11, 2015, on NBC.

The series is based on characters and elements appearing in Thomas Harris' novels Red Dragon and Hannibal, with focus on the relationship between FBI special investigator Will Graham (Hugh Dancy) and Dr. Hannibal Lecter (Mads Mikkelsen), a forensic psychiatrist destined to become Graham's most cunning enemy. The episode revolves around Will Graham recovering from his wounds at Lecter's house and surprised to discover Abigail Hobbs still alive despite her fatal injury. Graham and Abigail travel to Palermo in order to find Lecter, who is also on the radar of Inspector Rinaldo Pazzi.

According to Nielsen Media Research, the episode was seen by an estimated 1.66 million household viewers and gained a 0.5/2 ratings share among adults aged 18–49. The episode received mostly positive reviews from critics, who praised the visual imagery, directing and performances, although some expressed criticism at the slow pace and the omission of Alana Bloom's and Jack Crawford's fates.

== Plot ==
After the events at Lecter's house, Graham (Hugh Dancy) wakes up in the hospital, having survived the stabbing. He then receives a visitor: Abigail Hobbs (Kacey Rohl), who managed to survive her wounds. She says that Lecter (Mads Mikkelsen) carefully knew where to cut them in order to survive, as their wounds were "surgical".

Abigail reprimands Graham for conspiring against Lecter, stating that she still believes in Lecter despite him having wounded her. Graham remembers a conversation he had with Lecter where he described his "memory palace" to him, which Graham deduces to be the Norman Chapel at Palermo. Eight months later, Graham and Abigail visit the Chapel, where they analyze Lecter's view of himself as a God. The local police are investigating the Chapel after finding Dimmond's torso in the form of a human heart. Graham is approached by Chief Investigator Rinaldo Pazzi (Fortunato Cerlino), who has traveled from Florence. Pazzi is aware of Lecter and Graham, having investigated both of them before his arrival.

Lecter is known to him as "Il Mostro" or "The Monster of Florence" and Pazzi is linking him to a murder committed twenty years prior, where a couple was murdered and the corpses displayed like Sandro Botticelli's painting, Primavera, and for which another man was convicted. Pazzi hands a photograph of Dimmond's mutilation to Graham. As he is using his "ability", he is haunted when the mutilated corpse starts transforming into the stag before he snaps back to reality. He then talks with Abigail, and he finally remembers that Abigail died before he was taken by the ambulance. She disappears while Lecter is shown to be watching Graham from a distance in the Chapel.

Pazzi meets with Graham, who deduces that Lecter hasn't left the city and is actually at the Chapel at that moment. They descend into the Chapel's catacombs in pursuit of Lecter, but they fail to find him. Pazzi and Graham then have an argument about their purposes and Pazzi leaves. Graham continues investigating the catacombs. Knowing that Lecter is nearby, he says aloud, "I forgive you".

== Production ==
=== Development ===
In October 2014, Bryan Fuller announced that the second episode of the season would be titled "Primavera". In March 2015, Fuller announced that Vincenzo Natali would direct the episode. NBC would confirm the title in May 2015, with co-executive producer Jeff Vlaming and Fuller writing the episode and Natali directing. This was Fuller's 23rd writing credit, Vlaming's fourth writing credit, and Natali's fourth directing credit.

=== Writing ===
According to Fuller, the repercussions of the second season finale would not be revealed until "episode 2 or 3." The episode focuses on Will Graham after the events of the finale.

=== Casting ===
At the 2014 San Diego Comic-Con, Fuller confirmed that Inspector Rinaldo Pazzi would make his debut in the episode.

== Reception ==
=== Viewers ===
The episode was watched by 1.66 million viewers, earning a 0.5/2 in the 18-49 rating demographics on the Nielson ratings scale. This means that 0.5 percent of all households with televisions watched the episode, while 2 percent of all households watching television at that time watched it. This was a 36% decrease from the previous episode, which was watched by 2.57 million viewers with a 0.7/2 in the 18-49 demographics. With these ratings, Hannibal ranked third on its timeslot and eleventh for the night in the 18-49 demographics, behind an Elementary rerun, Aquarius, a Mom rerun, a Mike & Molly rerun, Wayward Pines, a The Odd Couple rerun, Dateline NBC, Bones, Jimmy Kimmel Live! Game Night, a The Big Bang Theory rerun, and the fourth game of the 2015 NBA Finals.

With DVR factored, the episode was watched with a 0.8 on the 18-49 demo.

=== Critical reviews ===
"Primavera" received mostly positive reviews from critics. Eric Goldman of IGN gave the episode a "great" 8.7 out of 10 and wrote in his verdict: "After last week focused on Hannibal and Bedelia, this episode continued to tweak the show's formula by focusing almost entirely on Will, as we found him following Hannibal overseas eight months after nearly being killed by him. The fake out with Abigail was both well done and heartbreaking, as we saw that sequence where Will was successfully operated on while Abigail's corpse was sewn up, underlining just what Will lost that night (again, given he already thought she was dead!) in a tangible, blunt way."

Molly Eichel of The A.V. Club gave the episode a "B+" and wrote, "Hannibal is pushing it a bit for me on the arty front. Look, I love the imagery of blood waves as much as the next girl, but I'm also a fan of straight narrative TV and sometimes that's what I crave over something inherently more complicated than that. Call me simple, call me unchallenging. I still think this show is gorgeous, but sometimes I'd like to see fewer blood droplets, and more linear plot."

Alan Sepinwall of HitFix wrote, "Two-plus seasons into Hannibal, I thought I had mentally prepared myself for whatever crazy visions this show wanted to put in front of me. I thought I would be some combination impressed, amused, and horrified, but that I would ultimately take it in stride as just being part of this weird and beautiful show. I thought I was ready for anything. I was wrong. The deer man is the freakiest goddamn image that Bryan Fuller and company have given us to date." Mark Rozeman of Paste gave the episode a 9.3 out of 10 and wrote, "'Primavera' offers up the kind of cinematic grandeur demonstrated in 'Antipasto' while upping the gore factor tremendously. As a result, the hour comes across as much more like a glorified Hannibal episode than the premiere, which felt like somewhat of a different beast entirely." Jeff Stone of IndieWire gave the episode an "A−" and wrote, "There have been some remarkable, awful sights of aesthetically-pleasing horrors on this show, but the one in 'Primavera' might just take the cake."

Brian Moylan of The Guardian wrote, "Now that Will and Hannibal are so close together, we can expect things in Europe to progress quickly. But what about the rest of the cast? Did anyone else survive Hannibal's vicious attack at his home at the end of last season? Maybe none of them did, but Will can just keep imagining people when he needs to. What a funny way to have a show. It will be like Herman's Head, but with a lot more blood." Keith Staskiewicz of Entertainment Weekly wrote, "The word 'fugue' itself can be traced to the Latin words fugere and fugare, which mean 'to flee' and 'to chase' respectively. It's clear the hunt is on, but it's not quite evident yet who is going to end up doing the fleeing and who the chasing."

Kayti Burt of Den of Geek gave the episode a 4 star rating out of 5 and wrote, "The degree to which Hannibal is willing to withhold answers and meaning while still managing to present a thoroughly engrossing show from week-to-week is refreshing. We don't have to understand everything that is going on, not everything has to be explained or wrapped up by episode's end. In some way, this confusion creates a connection with Will's character that transcends the visual and more traditionally narrative methods of relatability. Besides, after two seasons of this show, we expect more from this show than narrative handholding. We expect to work for our meaning." Nick McHatton of TV Fanatic gave the episode a 4.5 star rating out of 5 and wrote, "As usual, the visuals in this episode were absolutely stunning. For all our talk of Hannibal leaving everyone in a pool of blood, we got a literal pool of blood drowning Will in the beginning. I loved the beauty of the falling paper at Hannibal's house as Will woke up in perfect symmetry with the windows." Emma Dibdin of Digital Spy wrote, "As disorienting and dreamlike as 'Antipasto' felt, it's nothing in comparison to this episode, which unfolds entirely from Will's perspective and paints the landscape of his mind as more treacherous and unreliable than ever."

Adam Lehrer of Forbes wrote, "So, Will is alive and Abigail is dead. We still don't know whether Jack and/or Alana survived Hannibal's Season 2 finale massacre. But for now, I am excited to watch Hannibal and Will come to terms with their feelings for one another." Britt Hayes of ScreenCrush wrote, "This is such a rich, complex episode, and one that will likely reward repeat viewings. The conversations between Will and Abigail are just so heavy with meaning. It’s like a thesis statement for Season 3."
