= Bedelia Du Maurier =

- Hannibal character
- Gillian Anderson as Du Maurier
- First appearance: "Sorbet"
- Last appearance: "The Wrath of the Lamb"
- Created by: Bryan Fuller
- Portrayed by: Gillian Anderson

In-universe information
- Gender: Female
- Occupation: Psychiatrist
- Significant other: Hannibal Lecter (season 3)
- Nationality: American

Dr. Bedelia Du Maurier is a fictional character in the television series Hannibal. Unlike most characters in the stories, Du Maurier is an original creation, and does not appear in Thomas Harris' novels. She is portrayed by Gillian Anderson.

== Character overview ==
=== Season 1 ===
Du Maurier is introduced as Hannibal Lecter's (Mads Mikkelsen) psychiatrist and colleague. During their session, she tells him that she believes he is not being completely honest with her and that she has conversations with a version of him; she believes that he wears a "person-suit" or a "human-veil". It is revealed that her decision to retire came as a result of a violent incident involving a patient who was referred to her by Lecter and that this patient died during that attack. She warns Lecter that he must maintain professional boundaries in his relationship with Will Graham (Hugh Dancy) and that he might not be able to help him. During a dinner at Du Maurier's house, she warns Lecter to be careful as "they (the FBI) are starting to see your pattern" – suggesting she may be well aware of Lecter's nature.

=== Season 2 ===
Du Maurier terminates her psychiatrist–patient relationship with Lecter after coming to the conclusion that he is dangerous. She visits Graham in the Baltimore State Hospital for the Criminally Insane and tells him that she believes that Lecter framed him for murder. Lecter later goes to her house, seemingly to kill her, only to find that she has moved with no forwarding address. Some time later, Jack Crawford (Laurence Fishburne) manages to locate her. Having been granted immunity from prosecution, she admits to having killed Lecter's patient while under Lecter's influence. She warns Graham that Lecter is manipulating him as well. Du Maurier also warns Crawford that if he thinks that he is about to catch Lecter, it is only because Lecter wants him to think that. In a post-credits scene in the season finale, she is seen on a plane with Lecter, whose crimes have been discovered, bound for France.

=== Season 3 ===
Eight months after fleeing the United States, Du Maurier and Lecter settle in Florence, Italy, where they pose as a married couple under the assumed names Lydia and Roman Fell. By now, she has become complicit in his crimes, standing by as he murders two people who get close to discovering his identity. Lecter even notes that, "technically", she kills one of his victims by removing the ice pick that Lecter had jammed into the side of the man's head. When Crawford and Graham close in on Lecter, Du Maurier informs Lecter that she won't flee Italy with him. To create an alibi for herself, she injects herself with psychotropic drugs to make it appear as if Lecter had been drugging her into submission the whole time. Crawford and Graham question Du Maurier while she is under the influence. The Italian police – bought off by Lecter's surviving victim Mason Verger (Joe Anderson) – interrogate Du Maurier and she informs the lead detective on the case of Lecter's whereabouts to secure her freedom.

Three years later, Du Maurier makes her living from giving lectures on Lecter, presenting a story in which he drugged her into believing she was Lydia Fell. Graham, who is investigating The Tooth Fairy murders, makes an appointment with Du Maurier to discuss Lecter. During the appointment, a flashback reveals how she killed Lecter's patient. Du Maurier had a session with Neal Frank (Zachary Quinto), who accused Lecter of performing cruel experiments on him and accused her of being in league with Lecter. When Frank had a seizure and began choking on his own tongue, she deliberately shoved her entire forearm down his throat, suffocating him to death. Du Maurier justified what she did to Neal Frank by explaining to Will that when she witnesses that someone or something is vulnerable and in urgent need, rather than an act of compassion, her first thought is of an act of violence, arising out of a primal rejection of weakness which she considers to be both natural and instinctual. After The Tooth Fairy burns and disfigures Frederick Chilton (Raúl Esparza), Du Maurier suggests that Graham deliberately put Chilton in danger because he disliked him.

In the series finale, "The Wrath of the Lamb", Graham consults with Du Maurier on a plan to bait The Tooth Fairy, Francis Dolarhyde (Richard Armitage), by allowing Lecter to escape police custody. Du Maurier is horrified, believing that Lecter will kill her and everyone else if freed. She is last seen in a post-credits scene, sitting alone at a beautifully set dinner table and obviously under heavy sedation caused, most likely, by the same psychotropic drugs that she used upon herself in Italy. Du Maurier remains seated, the very picture of elegance, with her hair perfectly coiffed and wearing a luxurious gown, all while the entrée, her impeccably prepared leg, is plated in front of her as the table’s centerpiece; in a similar manner to Lecter's victim Abel Gideon (Eddie Izzard). As the scene ends, Du Maurier takes the table's carving fork and hides it in her lap. As the camera zooms out, it is revealed that not only is the table set for three but it is also located in the same room of her home where she once conducted therapy sessions with Hannibal and where she killed her patient, Neal Frank.

== Etymology ==
Bryan Fuller stated in an interview with The A.V. Club that he was inspired to name the character "Bedelia" after a character in Creepshow, and because it has "a classic, old-world style to it". Fuller, an Alfred Hitchcock fan, said that he named character "Du Maurier" after Daphne du Maurier, the author of Rebecca and "The Birds".

== Conception ==
The original intention was to cast an older actress, with Angela Lansbury the first choice for the part. When schedule conflicts prevented the hiring of Lansbury, Fuller decided on rewriting the character for a younger actress (Gillian Anderson). After the airing of the second episode of season two, in which Du Maurier outsmarts Lecter, Fuller tweeted "Bedelia is the smartest character on the show".

On the decision to extend Du Maurier's character in season 3, Fuller said "The cast and crew of Hannibal are positively giddy to be welcoming Gillian to season 3 as a series regular. A striking presence on stage and screen, she brings wit, grace and intelligence to every role she embodies. Screenwriting is so much easier when you're inspired by a great actor and Gillian has filled the Hannibal writers room with wonderful inspiration."

Fuller said, "The most important thing about the Bedelia–Hannibal relationship is one of two adults knowing exactly what they are getting into and navigating their own exit strategies for their respective best interests. Bedelia is always going to be Hannibal Lecter's psychiatrist, first and foremost. A lot of her fascination with this man and her willingness to join him on this journey is for her own edification as someone who's fascinated with the mind of killers. She is absolutely in control of her actions... I love her character and I love how Gillian Anderson portrays her". He added, "... the more interesting route for me as a storyteller is for that character to have her own drive, with her own curiosities about the human condition. That was a very important point for us to make with that storyline because I feel like we would be doing the actress and the character a disservice if we just made her a drug-induced pawn of Hannibal Lecter's plot". In another interview, he said that portraying Du Maurier as being in thrall to Lecter "would dishonour both the character and the actress [and] that's not how Gillian has been playing Bedelia".

Vincenzo Natali, who directed four episodes of the third season, shared his perspective on the relationship between Du Maurier and Lecter, "From Bedelia's side, she's approaching it a little bit like a scientist – she's very much there to observe Hannibal in his natural habitat. And for Hannibal's part, I mean, I think he really adores her".

"When I first started working on the series, it was just Mads [Mikkelsen] and I sitting across from each other, in a psychiatrist–patient relationship, and her cadence is born from that," Anderson said. "It's born from a need to remain on a particular level because she can't... reveal anything to him about what she's thinking. She's quite bold, but she's very self-aware and aware of how she's adjusted herself to fit him. That, ultimately, is where the cadence comes from. I do think that she is the smartest [person] in the room, and I do think that she's potentially one step ahead of him at times. So, she's always on her toes, but she also pushes his boundaries, and she pushes her own boundaries with him." Anderson added, "I think that it's wonderful that she's inscrutable to the audience, and I think that's really important... we're told too much these days about what to think and how to feel and know too much before we see it, and I think one of the things that intrigues me about some of the characters that I choose to play is that they're enigmatic, and I like to keep them enigmatic".

== Reception ==
Anderson's portrayal of Du Maurier was praised, particularly for the third season of the series. Anderson received a nomination of the 2013 Online Film & Television Association Award for Best Guest Actress in a Drama Series for her performance in the first season. In 2015 and 2016, she won the Fangoria Chainsaw Awards for Favorite Supporting Actress on Television for the second season and the third season. In 2016, Anderson was nominated for the Saturn Award for Best Supporting Actress on Television for her portrayal of Du Maurier in the third season.
