= Boom! (American game show) =

- Genre: Game show
- Created by: Keshet
- Developed by: Screenz Cross Media LTD
- Written by: Bob Boden; Chip Dornell; Eric Levy; Anna Lotto; Arnie Meissner
- Directed by: Ron de Moraes
- Presented by: Tom Papa
- Composer: Jingle Punks
- Country of origin: United States
- No. of seasons: 1
- No. of episodes: 10

Production
- Executive producers: Jeff Apploff; Allen Shapiro; Mike Mahan; Avi Nir; Alon Shtruzman; Ran Telem; Ido Rosenblum
- Editors: Ray Artis; Chester Contaoi; Tim Schultz; Pi Ware
- Running time: 44 minutes
- Production companies: Keshet; DCP; Apploff Entertainment

Original release
- Network: Fox
- Release: June 25 – September 10, 2015

Boom! is an American television game show that premiered on the Fox network on June 25, 2015. An adaptation of an Israeli series with the same title, Boom! is a general-knowledge quiz show where three players must correctly answer questions in order to defuse bombs. The program's stage utilizes 3D projection mapping featuring more than one million LEDs. Boom! is produced by Jeff Apploff and Bob Boden.

On August 21, 2016, Fox cancelled Boom! after one season due to low ratings.

== Format ==
=== Main game ===
Three players compete as a team to defuse a series of six time bombs by answering one question per bomb. Each question has several answer choices, only one of which is incorrect, and each answer corresponds to a differently colored wire on the bomb. The goal is to cut the wires for only the correct answers before the timer on the bomb reaches zero.

Before each question, the category is given and the team chooses one player to attempt it. When the player cuts a wire, the timer briefly stops and the result is revealed after a three-second delay. If the player cuts all the correct wires, the bomb is defused and money is added to the team's bank. However, if the player cuts the incorrect wire or if time runs out, the bomb "explodes", spraying its contents all over him/her and the studio. That player is then eliminated from the game, and no money is added to the bank.

The players and host all wear safety goggles for eye protection while onstage, and the audience members in the front rows wear goggles and plastic rain ponchos to keep themselves clean. The contents of the bombs are typically food items that are sticky and/or hard to clean off clothing, such as pizza sauce, maple syrup, and gravy.

Every player must attempt to defuse at least one of the six bombs. If all three players are eliminated, the game ends and the team leaves with no winnings. Values, time limits, and numbers of answer choices increase from one question to the next as shown below.

Bomb	Value	Time limit	Possible answers
1	$5,000	30 seconds	4
2	$10,000	30 seconds	4
3	$15,000	30 seconds	4
4	$20,000	40 seconds	5
5	$25,000	50 seconds	6
6	$50,000	60 seconds	7

=== Mega Money Bomb ===
If at least one player is still in the game after the sixth bomb, the team must decide whether to take their winnings and end the game, or attempt to answer a seventh question and defuse the final Mega Money Bomb. The host gives them the category for this question in order to help them decide.

The question has 10 answer choices, seven correct and three incorrect, and a 90-second time limit. One player cuts the wires, while the other two can offer advice, and all three must stand over the bomb. Any player may be chosen to cut the wires, regardless of whether or not he/she was eliminated from the main game. If the players successfully defuse the bomb, their entire bank is quadrupled; if not, it is cut in half.

The maximum possible winnings total is $500,000, obtained by successfully defusing all seven bombs.

== Episodes ==
No.	Title	Original release date	Viewers (millions)
1	"It's the Maple Syrup Bomb!"	June 25, 2015	2.52
2	"It's the Macaroni & Cheese Bomb!"	July 2, 2015	2.09
3	"It's the Wedding Cake Bomb!"	July 9, 2015	2.22
4	"It's the Creamed Spinach Bomb!"	July 16, 2015	2.03
5	"It's the Blueberry Slushy Bomb!"	July 23, 2015	2.13
6	"It's the Hot Fudge Bomb!"	July 30, 2015	1.86
7	"It's the Turkey Gravy Bomb!"	August 13, 2015	1.74
8	"It's the Sweet Potato Bomb!"	August 20, 2015	1.95
9	"It's the Guacamole Bomb!"	August 27, 2015	2.11
10	"It's the Refried Beans Bomb!"	September 10, 2015	1.85
