= Mason Verger =

Fictional character in novel Hannibal

- Hannibal Lecter character
- Gary Oldman as Mason Verger in the 2001 film Hannibal
- Created by: Thomas Harris
- Portrayed by: Gary Oldman (Hannibal); Michael Pitt (Hannibal; season 2); Joe Anderson (Hannibal; season 3)

In-universe information
- Gender: Male
- Occupation: CEO of Verger Meat Packing
- Family: Molson Verger (father, deceased); Margot Verger (sister)
- Religion: Southern Baptist Convention
- Nationality: American

Mason Roland Verger is a fictional character and the main antagonist of Thomas Harris' 1999 novel Hannibal, as well as its 2001 film adaptation and the second and third seasons of the TV series Hannibal. In the film, he is portrayed by Gary Oldman, while in the TV series he is portrayed by Michael Pitt and Joe Anderson.

== Character overview ==
Mason Verger is introduced in the novel Hannibal as a wealthy, sadistic pedophile who was paralyzed and severely disfigured during a therapy session with Dr. Hannibal Lecter. He plans gruesome revenge against Lecter, which sets the novel's plot in motion. The novel and TV series also portray his estranged relationship with his sister Margot, whom he has subjected to years of emotional and sexual abuse.

== Appearances ==
=== Red Dragon ===
In Red Dragon, Will Graham mentions that Hannibal Lecter has nine known murder victims, while two other victims survived, one of whom is "on a respirator at a hospital in Baltimore." This is the earliest reference to Mason, though he is not named or further detailed until Hannibal.

=== Hannibal ===
Mason Verger is the scion of one of Baltimore, Maryland's most wealthy, politically connected families. His ancestors founded a meatpacking company that dated back to the American Civil War, and Mason's father, Molson, had expanded the company into an empire by the time of Mason's birth.

Mason takes pleasure in acts of cruelty and sexual violence, including torturing animals and molesting children. He also performs autoerotic asphyxiation, and enjoys collecting children's tears with sterile swabs and flavoring his martinis with them. At one point he befriends Idi Amin, with whom he claims to have re-enacted the crucifixion of Jesus by nailing a migrant worker to a cross. Publicly, he claims to be a born-again Christian, and operates a Christian camp for underprivileged children—whom he molests. As a teenager, Mason raped his sister, Margot, who went into therapy with Lecter to deal with the trauma. Lecter suggested that it would be cathartic for her to kill her brother.

Verger is eventually arrested for several counts of child molestation, but thanks to his family's political connections he is sentenced to community service and court-mandated therapy in lieu of prison time. Lecter serves as his court-appointed psychiatrist. During one of their sessions, Lecter invites Mason to demonstrate autoerotic asphyxiation, then gives him a cocktail of psychedelic drugs disguised as an amyl popper and suggests that he peel off his own face with a piece of broken mirror. In a state of drug-induced euphoria, Mason complies, and feeds the pieces to his dogs, except for his nose, which he himself eats. Lecter then tightens the noose around Mason's neck so hard it breaks his spine. Mason survives the ordeal, but is left severely disfigured—with skin grafts covering the lost portions of his face—blind in his right eye, paralyzed from the neck down, and dependent on a ventilator to breathe.

Lecter is arrested soon afterward for committing a series of murders, and Mason tries to influence the resulting trial to make sure Lecter receives the death penalty. When Lecter is instead found not guilty by reason of insanity and institutionalized, Mason begins plotting to feed Lecter alive to a pack of wild boars, specially bred for the purpose.

After his disfigurement, Mason becomes a recluse, rarely leaving Muskrat Farm, his country estate. He nevertheless indulges in whatever paraphilias his disability allows, such as getting sexual gratification from making children cry. Verger's only sources of human contact are his assistant, Cordell—a fellow sex offender—and Margot, who works for Mason as a bodyguard. Margot despises her brother, but stays in his employ to persuade him to donate his sperm to her partner, Judy Ingram, so they can conceive a child. Mason strings her along, knowing she cannot leave if she wants to see her share of the Verger family fortune; their father had disinherited her when she came out as a lesbian, and willed his estate to any future heir Mason might have.

Seven years after Lecter's escape in The Silence of the Lambs, Mason bribes Lecter's former guard, Barney Matthews, for information leading to his capture.

When detective Rinaldo Pazzi spots Lecter in Florence, Italy, he contacts Mason in hopes of collecting the reward money. Mason bribes Justice Department official Paul Krendler to discredit Lecter's foil Clarice Starling in order to coax Lecter out of hiding. He hires a gang of Sardinians to kidnap Lecter, and instructs Pazzi to lead Lecter to them.

Lecter learns of Mason's plot, and kills Pazzi as he flees to the United States. Mason's men eventually capture Lecter, and he prepares to enjoy his long-awaited revenge. However, Lecter escapes his bonds, with help from Starling.

Mason is finally killed when Margot forcibly collects his sperm using a cattle prod and a condom, then forces Mason’s pet eel into his mouth, the resulting wounds drowning him in his own blood.

== In other media ==
=== Film ===
In the 2001 film, Hannibal, Mason is portrayed by Gary Oldman. The film's characterization of Mason Verger follows close to the novel, except for three key aspects: the character of Margot Verger is omitted; Mason is not completely bedridden, does not require a ventilator to breathe, and as he is able to move his right hand, he is partially ambulatory through the use of a motorized wheelchair; and the manner of Mason's death is changed: instead of Margot, Mason dies at the hands of his physician, Cordell Doemling (Željko Ivanek), who at Lecter's suggestion pushes his hated boss into the pig pen in which Lecter was intended to die, where he is devoured by the pack of wild boars he had bred for killing Lecter.

=== TV series ===
Joe Anderson as Mason Verger in the NBC series Hannibal

Mason Verger appears in the NBC television series Hannibal as the main antagonist for the second half of the second season and the first half of the third season. He is portrayed by Michael Pitt in the show's second season, and by Joe Anderson in the third. Series creator Bryan Fuller called this version of the character "The Joker to Hannibal's Batman".

==== Season 2 ====
Mason sexually assaults his sister Margot (Katharine Isabelle), who then tries to kill him. He sends her to therapy with Lecter (Mads Mikkelsen). Mason meets with Lecter to discuss Margot's treatment, and agrees to enter therapy with Lecter to find out what his sister is saying about him. Lecter takes an immediate dislike to Mason, considering him "discourteous".

Mason tells Margot that he wants them to have a "Verger baby", the implication being that he wants to father his own sister's child. He threatens to cut her off financially if she disobeys him. Desperate, Margot has sex with another of Lecter's patients, Will Graham (Hugh Dancy) and becomes pregnant with his child. After Lecter tells him what Margot is trying to do, Mason causes Margot to get into a car accident and has her womb surgically removed so that only he can father an heir and inherit the family fortune. A furious Graham confronts Mason and warns him that Lecter is manipulating them both.

Mason eventually grows suspicious of Lecter and has him kidnapped along with Graham, intending to feed them both to his prize pigs. However, Lecter escapes with Graham's help and takes Mason as a captive to Graham's house. Lecter gives Mason a hallucinogenic drug cocktail and convinces him to cut his own face off and feed the pieces to Graham's dogs. Mason does so, and also obeys Lecter's command to cut off his own nose and eat it. Lecter then breaks Mason's neck with his bare hands. Mason survives, but is paralyzed, confined to a respirator and forced to wear a neck brace and a facial mask. He tells FBI Agent-in-Charge Jack Crawford (Laurence Fishburne) that he sustained his injuries after falling into a pig pen; he intends to keep Lecter out of the FBI's hands so he can torture and kill Lecter himself. Mason is then left alone with a vengeful Margot, who promises him she will "take care of you just as you took care of me."

==== Season 3 ====
After Lecter flees to Europe following the discovery of his crimes, Mason puts a $3 million bounty on him. He enlists Lecter's colleague and former lover Alana Bloom (Caroline Dhavernas) to help catch him. He also employs Margot, who is secretly planning to harvest his sperm in order to conceive a child with Alana's assistance. Unbeknownst to her, however, Mason has preserved the fetus Margot conceived with Graham, and implanted it in a giant sow's womb to birth a "Verger baby", which is later found to be stillborn.

Italian police detective Rinaldo Pazzi (Fortunato Cerlino) makes a deal with Mason to bring Lecter in, but Lecter kills Pazzi instead. Mason then hires other corrupt Italian police detectives to apprehend Lecter and Graham and bring them to his country estate, Muskrat Farm. He orders his physician Cordell Doemling (Glenn Fleshler) to slowly mutilate Lecter to death and prepare gourmet cuisine from his flesh. Mason also tells Doemling to put him under anesthesia for a special surgery: Doemling will cut off Graham's face and graft it onto Mason's.

Before the procedure can take place, however, Lecter escapes captivity, kills Doemling, and helps Margot 'milk' the unconscious Mason's prostate with a cattle prod for the sperm she needs to conceive a child. When Mason awakes, Margot tells him that she will have a baby of her own and inherit their father's estate. She kills Mason by holding him underwater in his eel tank, where his pet moray eel swims down his throat and suffocates him.
