= Joe Anderson (actor) =

English actor (born 1982)

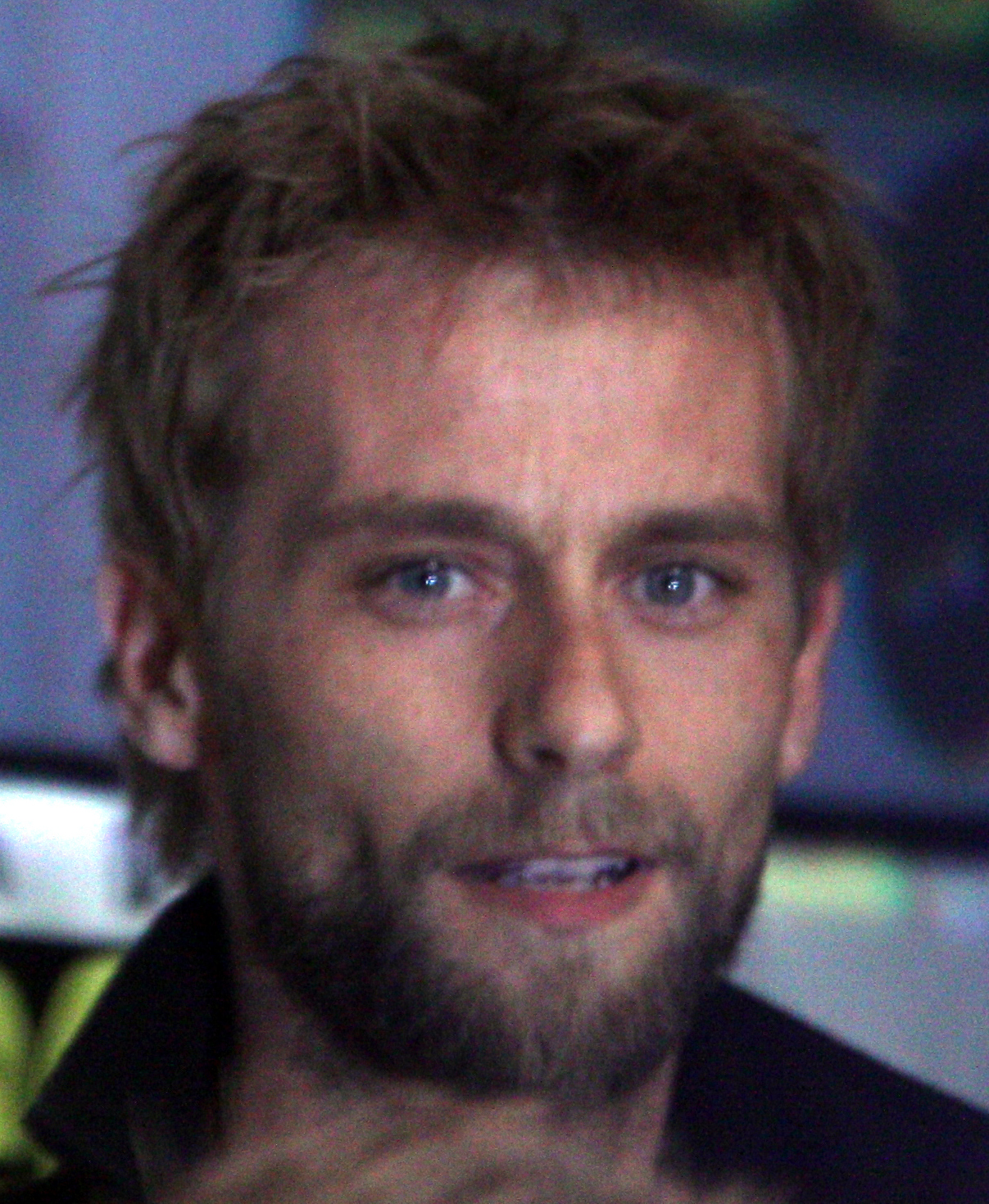
- Anderson at the 2012 Comic-Con in San Diego
- Born: Joe Anderson; 26 March 1982 (age 44); England, United Kingdom
- Occupation: Actor
- Years active: 2004–present
- Notable work: Across the Universe; Control; The Ruins; The Crazies; Hannibal
- Spouse: Elle Anderson
- Parents: Miles Anderson (father); Lesley Duff (mother)
- Awards: California Independent Film Festival Rising Star Award (2008)

Joe Anderson (born 26 March 1982) is an English actor best known for his work in Across the Universe, Becoming Jane, Control, The Ruins, The Crazies, Horns and as Alistair in The Twilight Saga: Breaking Dawn – Part 2 (2012) and Asa Farrell in the WGN America drama series Outsiders. He also played Joseph in The Reckoning.

== Early life ==
Anderson's father is actor Miles Anderson and his mother is talent agent Lesley Duff. He has been acting professionally since childhood. He attended Richmond upon Thames College and later the Webber Douglas Academy of Dramatic Art in London. His interests include photography, guitar and gymnastics. He has been diagnosed with dyslexia and attributes this to his move into acting.

== Career ==
Anderson has worked in film, television and on stage at the Chichester Festival Theatre. Earlier in his career he appeared in Copying Beethoven, playing Ludwig van Beethoven's nephew Karl. He then starred as Max Carrigan, a young American man, drafted into the Vietnam War in Across the Universe. After that, he appeared in period film Becoming Jane as Henry Austen, Jane Austen's older brother, then as bassist Peter Hook of the band Joy Division in Anton Corbijn's 2007 film Control. In 2008, he played Elliot in The 27 Club and a German tourist in The Ruins. In 2009, he starred in High Life as Donnie and in Love Happens as the musician boyfriend of Jennifer Aniston's character. He was also seen in Amelia, the biopic of Amelia Earhart, and in Operation: Endgame as the main character Fool. He appeared in 2010's The Crazies, a remake of the 1973 horror film of the same name.

He and his castmates from Control were featured in the Killers' music video for their version of the Joy Division song "Shadowplay".

In an interview with Pure Movies, he said talking about himself made him feel "uncomfortable" and "self indulgent" and that he struggled with it.

In 2012, he starred as Lincoln Cole in the television series The River. He appeared as Alistair in The Twilight Saga: Breaking Dawn – Part 2, and in 2014 co-starred alongside Dwayne Johnson in Hercules.

In December 2014, it was announced that Anderson would be replacing Michael Pitt in the role of Mason Verger in the third season of the TV series Hannibal.

In May 2024, he appeared as John Francis Vater in the Doctor Who episode "Boom".

=== Awards ===
Anderson received the Rising Star Award at the California Independent Film Festival in 2008. He was named Best Actor Drama at Fort Lauderdale International Film Festival 2008 for his performance in The 27 Club.

=== Musical performances ===
In Across the Universe, he sang covers of Beatles songs. The numbers he performed solo or with other cast members included "Hey Jude", "Happiness Is a Warm Gun", "With a Little Help from My Friends", "Strawberry Fields Forever", "Dear Prudence", "Because" and "I Want You (She's So Heavy)". All of these recordings were released on the corresponding soundtrack album.

In Control, as bassist Peter Hook of the group Joy Division, he and his cast mates performed "Transmission", "Leaders of Men" and "Candidate" among others. These three performances were shown in their entirety in the special features under the extended performance scenes section of the DVD. "Transmission" was the only recording by the cast released on the soundtrack album.

In The 27 Club, Anderson played the bassist of a successful music duo called Finn. He and cast/bandmate James Forgey penned the theme song for the film. A studio version and an acoustic version of the song were made available on the film's official website.

In Horns, Anderson played Terry Perrish, a famous trumpet player and brother of Ig Parrish, played by Daniel Radcliffe. In the film, Anderson performs lead trumpet in a scene with the band The Brass Action.

== Filmography ==
=== Film ===
Year	Title	Role
2004	Creep	Male Model
2005	Silence Becomes You	Luke Green
2006	Copying Beethoven	Karl van Beethoven
2006	Little Box of Sweets	Seth
2007	Across the Universe	Max Carrigan
2007	Becoming Jane	Henry Austen
2007	Control	Peter Hook
2008	The 27 Club	Elliot
2008	The Ruins	Mathias
2009	Amelia	William "Bill" Stutz
2009	High Life	Donnie
2009	Love Happens	Tyler
2010	Operation: Endgame	Fool
2010	The Crazies	Russell Clank
2011	Flutter	John
2011	The Grey	Todd Flannery
2012	The Twilight Saga: Breaking Dawn – Part 2	Alistair
2013	A Single Shot	Obadiah
2013	Horns	Terry Perrish
2014	Hercules	Phineas
2014	Supremacy	Garrett Tully
2015	Bleeding Heart	Cody
2016	Abattoir	Declan Grady
2016	My Father Die	Asher Rawlings
2017	Hangman	Hangman
2017	The Ballad of Lefty Brown	Frank Baines
2019	Backdraft 2	Sean McCaffrey
2019	Cold Blood	Kappa
2020	The Reckoning	Joseph
2022	The Devil Conspiracy	Lucifer
2024	Murder Company	Smith
2024	The Last Front	Laurentz
2025	The Spirit Lock	

=== Television ===
Year	Title	Role	Notes
2005	Midsomer Murders	Max "Mad" Ransom	Episode: "Second Sight"
2005	Afterlife	Phil	Episode: "More Than Meets the Eye"
2012	The River	Lincoln Cole	8 episodes
2014	The Divide	Terry Kucik	8 episodes
2015	Hannibal	Mason Verger	4 episodes
2016–2017	Outsiders	Asa Farrell	14 episodes
2020	Soulmates	Travis	Episode: "Break On Through"
2024	Doctor Who	John Francis Vater	Episode: "Boom"

== Awards and nominations ==
Year	Award	Category	Result	Work
2008	Ft. Lauderdale International Film Festival	Best Actor Drama	Won	The 27 Club
2011	Fangoria Chainsaw Awards	Best Supporting Actor	Nominated	The Crazies
