= Trou Normand (Hannibal) =

- Hannibal episode
- Episode no.: Season 1 Episode 9
- Directed by: Guillermo Navarro
- Written by: Steve Lightfoot
- Cinematography by: James Hawkinson
- Editing by: Ben Wilkinson
- Production code: 109
- Original air date: May 23, 2013
- Running time: 42 minutes

Guest appearances
- Scott Thompson as Jimmy Price; Aaron Abrams as Brian Zeller; Kacey Rohl as Abigail Hobbs; Lara Jean Chorostecki as Freddie Lounds; Lance Henriksen as Lawrence Wells; Mark Rendall as Nicholas Boyle; Vladimir Cubrt as Garret Jacob Hobbs; Torianna Lee as Elise Nichols; Dominique Bisson as Shrike Victim #2; Eve Gane as Shrike Victim #3; Emma Gibbs as Shrike Victim #4; Jessie Saunders-Drutz as Shrike Victim #5; Jason Blicker as Joel Summers

Episode chronology
← Previous "Fromage"	Next → "Buffet Froid"
- Hannibal season 1

"Trou Normand" is the ninth episode of the first season of the psychological thriller–horror series Hannibal. The episode was written by Steve Lightfoot, and directed by Guillermo Navarro. It was first broadcast on May 23, 2013, on NBC.

The series is based on characters and elements appearing in Thomas Harris' novels Red Dragon and Hannibal, with focus on the relationship between FBI special investigator Will Graham (Hugh Dancy) and Dr. Hannibal Lecter (Mads Mikkelsen), a forensic psychiatrist destined to become Graham's most cunning enemy. The episode revolves around a totem pole of human bodies found in a beach, with evidence tracking decades of murders. Meanwhile, Nicholas Boyle's corpse is found and Crawford strongly suspects that Abigail Hobbs was involved in his death and even helping her father commit his crimes.

According to Nielsen Media Research, the episode was seen by an estimated 2.69 million household viewers and gained a 1.0/3 ratings share among adults aged 18–49. The episode received positive reviews from critics, who praised Kacey Rohl's performance, character development and curiosity regarding Lecter's actions in the episode.

== Plot ==
At a beach in Grafton, West Virginia, BAU has found a totem pole of human bodies ranging from freshly killed to decades old. As Graham (Hugh Dancy) uses his "ability", he suddenly finds himself on Lecter's (Mads Mikkelsen) office, three and a half hours away, with no recollection of how he got there. Lecter theorizes that Graham's mind is trying to escape from having to investigate such brutal murders.

Abigail (Kacey Rohl) has been tormented by nightmares where her father's victims blame her. She also learns from Lounds (Lara Jean Chorostecki) that the victims' families are filing a wrongful death claim against hers and will receive compensation, leaving Abigail without money. Lounds convinces Abigail to publish a book about her story and about her father. Graham and Lecter talk to Abigail, expressing concern about how the book could involve them, but Abigail remains firm on her decision to publish her story. Graham's mind is affecting his perception of reality, as he delivers class notes to an empty lecture hall at the FBI Academy. Bloom (Caroline Dhavernas) visits him and states she regrets leaving his house after their kiss. Nevertheless, she says that even though she has feelings for him, she can't be in a romantic relationship with him as she considers him "unstable".

Authorities have discovered the corpse of Nicholas Boyle (Mark Rendall), who Abigail murdered and Lecter disposed of. Crawford (Laurence Fishburne) wants Abigail to identify him, as he strongly suspects her of being involved. Abigail identifies Boyle's body but denies involvement in his death. After she leaves, Crawford still suspects her while Bloom admonishes him for his treatment of Abigail; she fully believes she is innocent as Lecter wouldn't lie about it. Lecter later talks with Abigail, who is revealed to be the one who dug up Boyle's corpse. She defends her actions as she isn't worried about authorities finding it eventually, although Lecter is still upset.

The freshest totem pole victim is identified as Joel Summers, who was the son of Fletcher Marshall, the oldest body on the pole, before he was adopted. The killings are traced to Lawrence Wells (Lance Henriksen), who was having an affair with Marshall's wife and killed him in a crime of passion. The rest of the killings were for his own satisfaction; knowing he'd be caught, he could "retire" to a life in prison, which would be better than any retirement home he could afford. However, Graham reveals that Summers was not Marshall's biological son; he was Wells', who unknowingly murdered his own son.

Using his "ability", Graham deduces that Abigail killed Boyle. He shares this with Lecter, who confesses to helping her hide the body, although he claims that Abigail killed him in self-defense as Crawford would arrest her. Graham reluctantly agrees to keep her secret so that she won't inherit her father's brutal legacy. They then have dinner with Abigail and Lounds, who explains her intentions with the book. In the kitchen, Lecter states that Graham knows and won't talk, which should relieve her. However, Abigail reveals to Lecter that she was aware of her father's crimes and helped him get victims by befriending them. Lecter hugs her, having deduced it earlier, telling that he and Graham will protect her. The episode ends with a flashback, where Hobbs (Vladimir Cubrt) instructs Abigail to befriend Elise Nichols while they travel on a train.

== Production ==
=== Development ===
In May 2013, it was announced that the ninth episode of the series would be titled "Trou Normand", and was directed by Guillermo Navarro and written by Steve Lightfoot. This was Lightfoot's first writing credit, and Navarro's second directing credit.

=== Writing ===
Bryan Fuller explained Lecter's intentions in the episode, "I think his plan was to create a family with Will Graham and Abigail Hobbs, in a way that they are all severely compromised as human beings, and he would be able to help both Will Graham and Abigail Hobbs accept themselves for what the world has made them to be."

=== Casting ===
In January 2013, it was announced that Lance Henriksen would guest star in an undisclosed role. Fuller said that the casting was a homage to his character, Frank Black, from the series Millennium. He explained, "he was somebody that we knew was going to take one scene and make it feel like you just saw a movie with the guy."

== Reception ==
=== Viewers ===
The episode was watched by 2.69 million viewers, earning a 1.0/3 in the 18-49 rating demographics on the Nielson ratings scale. This means that 1 percent of all households with televisions watched the episode, while 3 percent of all households watching television at that time watched it. This was a 9% increase from the previous episode, which was watched by 2.46 million viewers with a 1.1/5 in the 18-49 demographics. With these ratings, Hannibal ranked second on its timeslot and ninth for the night in the 18-49 demographics, behind Wipeout, Rookie Blue, a Person of Interest rerun, Does Someone Have to Go?, Motive, a Two and a Half Men rerun, Hell's Kitchen, and a The Big Bang Theory rerun.

With DVR factored in, the episode was watched by 4.24 million viewers with a 1.9 in the 18-49 demographics.

=== Critical reviews ===
"Trou Normand" received positive reviews from critics. Eric Goldman of IGN gave the episode a "great" 8.3 out of 10 and wrote, "Has any show ever mixed the beautiful with the disturbing more than Hannibal? It's such an artfully made series about such ugly acts, much like its title character and what he does with those he murders."

Molly Eichel of The A.V. Club gave the episode a "B+" and wrote, "In the last few episodes, Hannibal has started to reflect its title, becoming much more about the show's namesake than it was in the beginning when it focused on Will, and then shifted to focus on Jack and his issues. But 'Trou Normand' was a nice ensemble piece, with everyone getting their turn. I especially enjoyed the Hannibal-Will scenes, featuring two fine actors working particularly well off of each other."

Alan Sepinwall of HitFix wrote, "I think the shifting spotlight between Will and Lecter is a good thing for the series, as we're getting a very strong sense of both men as things go along, even if Hannibal is the more famous one (whose name gets to be in the title). This was another excellent outing." Laura Akers of Den of Geek wrote, "Freddie Louds' opinion of one of Hannibal's meticulously prepared dinners may, ironically, reflect the very problem of placing such a show on broadcast television in the first place: it is simply too meaty to please some palates." Kevin Fitzpatrick of ScreenCrush wrote, "We were very much won over by Hannibal's suprising [sic] admissions of his crimes, further deepening the bond between him and Will rather than cheapen the story with an endless cat-and-mouse the way certain other serial killer series have done in past."
