= Hannibal season 1 =

Season of television series

Hannibal
- Season 1
- Promotional poster
- Starring: Hugh Dancy; Mads Mikkelsen; Caroline Dhavernas; Hettienne Park; Laurence Fishburne
- No. of episodes: 13

Release
- Original network: NBC
- Original release: April 4 – June 20, 2013

Season chronology
- Next → Season 2

The first season of the American television series Hannibal premiered on April 4, 2013. The season is produced by Dino de Laurentiis Company, Living Dead Guy Productions, AXN Original Productions, and Gaumont International Television, with Sidonie Dumas, Christophe Riandee, Katie O'Connell, Elisa Roth, Sara Colleton, David Slade, Chris Brancato, Jesse Alexander, Martha De Laurentiis, and Bryan Fuller serving as executive producers. Fuller serves as the series developer and showrunner, writing or co-writing 10 episodes of the season.

The series was given a 13-episode order in February 2012 and stars Hugh Dancy, Mads Mikkelsen, Caroline Dhavernas, Hettienne Park, and Laurence Fishburne. The series is based on characters and elements appearing in Thomas Harris' novels Red Dragon (1981), Hannibal (1999), and Hannibal Rising (2006) and focuses on the relationship between FBI special investigator Will Graham and Dr. Hannibal Lecter, a forensic psychiatrist that is secretly a cannibalistic serial killer. Each episode of the season is named after an element of French cuisine.

The season premiered on April 4, 2013 on NBC. The series premiere received 4.36 million viewers with a 1.6/5 ratings share in the 18–49 demographics. The season ended on June 20, 2013, with an average of 2.90 million viewers. The season received extremely positive reviews, with critics praising the performances, writing, visual style and its new take on the characters. In May 2013, NBC renewed the series for a second season.

== Cast and characters ==
=== Main ===
- Hugh Dancy as Will Graham
- Mads Mikkelsen as Dr. Hannibal Lecter
- Caroline Dhavernas as Alana Bloom
- Hettienne Park as Beverly Katz
- Laurence Fishburne as Jack Crawford

=== Recurring ===
- Scott Thompson as Jimmy Price
- Aaron Abrams as Brian Zeller
- Vladimir Jon Cubrt as Garrett Jacob Hobbs
- Kacey Rohl as Abigail Hobbs
- Lara Jean Chorostecki as Freddie Lounds
- Gillian Anderson as Bedelia Du Maurier
- Dan Fogler as Franklyn Froideveaux
- Mark Rendall as Nicholas Boyle
- Demore Barnes as Tobias Budge
- Anna Chlumsky as Miriam Lass
- Raúl Esparza as Dr. Frederick Chilton
- Eddie Izzard as Abel Gideon
- Ellen Muth as Georgia Madchen
- Gina Torres as Phyllis "Bella" Crawford

=== Notable guests ===
- Aidan Devine as Eldon Stammets
- Chelan Simmons as Gretchen Speck
- Molly Shannon as the Woman
- Cynthia Preston as Emma Buddish
- Ellen Greene as Mrs. Komeda
- Lance Henriksen as Lawrence Wells
- John Benjamin Hickey as Dr. Sutcliffe

== Episodes ==
No. overall	No. in season	Title	Directed by	Written by	Original release date	Prod. code	U.S. viewers (millions)
1	1	"Apéritif"	David Slade	Bryan Fuller	April 4, 2013	101	4.36
Will Graham, an FBI special investigator and academy lecturer, uses his uncanny ability to empathize with serial killers to catch them, the strain of which causes him to frequently have disturbing thoughts and visions. Behavioral Sciences head Jack Crawford asks him to help catch a killer that abducts similar looking girls, who breaks his pattern when he returns a victim's body to her home because of her liver cancer. Academy psychiatry professor Alana Bloom recommends that psychiatrist and secret serial killing cannibal Hannibal Lecter be brought in, who kills a woman, Cassie Boyle, in a style similar to the other killer to clue Will into his motivations. Will realizes that the cannibalized victims likely resemble the killer's daughter. A shred of metal on the returned victim's clothes leads him to Garret Jacob Hobbs, who Hannibal alerts as he and Will go to arrest him. Hobbs kills his wife and mortally wounds his daughter Abigail, but is killed by Will while Abigail is stabilized by Hannibal, who later sits with Will in her hospital room.
2	2	"Amuse-Bouche"	Michael Rymer	Jim Danger Gray	April 11, 2013	102	4.38
As Jack suspects that Abigail may have been Hobbs's accomplice, he sends Will for a psych eval with Hannibal, who clears him as they discuss their guilt over Abigail. Bodies are found buried and used as food for mushrooms growing on them, and tabloid journalist Freddie Lounds notices Will using his method at the scene. She spies on a session with Hannibal and writes an article framing Will as dangerous, while he learns that the victims were all diabetic and put in a coma via swapped medication. He tracks down pharmacist Eldon Stammets in the process of abducting another victim, who flees when he sees Lounds's article and corners her, demanding information on Will. Lounds tells Jack afterwards that Stammets is going after Abigail, and Will stops him from abducting her. In a session, Will admits that he is seeing visions of Hobbs, and Hannibal wonders if he is truly haunted by the experience of killing rather than Hobbs himself.
3	3	"Potage"	David Slade	Story by : David Fury; Teleplay by : David Fury and Chris Brancato and Bryan Fuller	April 18, 2013	105	3.51
Lounds approaches Cassie's brother Nicholas, who believes Abigail helped Hobbs kill her, and reveals that she woke from her coma. Hannibal, Will, and Alana take Abigail to Hobbs's cabin, where she realizes that he "honored every part" of his victims by making their remains into everyday objects and possibly fed them to his family. Her friend Marissa Schurr is found dead upstairs, murdered in the same way as Cassie, and Hannibal concludes Nicholas killed her. Nicholas breaks into Abigail's house to profess his innocence and she kills him in terror, and Hannibal helps her hide the body and make it look like Nicholas killed Marissa and Cassie. Abigail later realizes that Hannibal alerted Hobbs, and they agree to keep each other's secrets.
4	4	"Oeuf"	Peter Medak	Jennifer Schuur	April 26, 2013 (India); Unaired (U.S.)	104	N/A
A series of murders begin where the families of missing boys are murdered, with the mother always killed last. As Will theorizes that the boys have formed a family and are following an "older brother" figure who forces them to kill their own families, one boy is killed alongside his family for disobeying the group. As a comment from Alana leads Will to realize that the leader is actually a mother replacement, footage taken at a gas station shows one missing boy traveling towards his family. The Behavioral Analysis Unit (BAU) arrives before the family can be killed, and the "mother" tries to get the boy to kill Will, who stalls until his colleague Beverly Katz can shoot her. A comment the boy makes towards Jack about parentage unnerves him, and he asks his distant wife Phyllis "Bella" Crawford if it is too late to have kids, to which she responds "it is for me." As Will confesses to Hannibal his paternal feelings towards Abigail, Hannibal removes her from the psychiatric hospital to stay with him. He drugs her with mushrooms and, when Alana comes over for dinner, Abigail hallucinates her and Hannibal as her parents.
5	5	"Coquilles"	Guillermo Navarro	Story by : Scott Nimerfro; Teleplay by : Scott Nimerfro and Bryan Fuller	April 25, 2013	106	2.40
Will begins sleepwalking, dreaming of following a stag he has been having recurring visions of. A man who can sense people that are guilty of crimes makes them into "angels" by skinning their backs and making the flesh into "wings," and analysis of his vomit left at a crime scene indicates that he has a brain tumor. As the killer's severed genitalia is left at another scene, he is identified as Elliot Buddish, and his estranged wife Emma tells Jack and Will that the tumor made him abandon his family and gives them the location of where he once had a near-death experience. The two find Buddish there, having committed suicide by turning himself into an angel. Will admits his doubts about continuining his work despite Jack pressing him to stay, and hallucinates Buddish, who tells him "I see what you are." Hannibal begins treating Bella, who admits she has lung cancer. Having recognized her behavior in Emma's description of Buddish, Jack confronts her and they agree to stay together.
6	6	"Entrée"	Michael Rymer	Story by : Kai Yu Wu; Teleplay by : Kai Yu Wu and Bryan Fuller	May 2, 2013	107	2.61
Murderer Abel Gideon, incarcerated at the Baltimore State Hospital for the Criminally Insane, kills a nurse in a manner similar to the Wound Man diagram, mirroring the "Chesapeake Ripper" killer. Will quickly deduces Gideon to be merely imitating, as his murder was much less methodical and sadistic than the real Ripper. At dinner with hospital administrator and psychiatrist Frederick Chilton, Hannibal realizes that Chilton unintentionally planted the idea that Gideon was the Ripper in his mind during a session. Jack, having lost his trainee Miriam Lass to the Ripper while she was investigating two years prior, begins receiving calls that play a recording of the call for help she made after being caught by the killer. He asks Lounds to run a story claiming Gideon is the Ripper in hopes of luring out the real one, and the calls are traced to an observatory where Miriam's severed arm is found holding a phone. A flashback reveals that Miriam was interviewing Hannibal, who encountered the latest Ripper victim, and was choked unconscious upon realizing he was the killer.
7	7	"Sorbet"	James Foley	Jesse Alexander & Bryan Fuller	May 9, 2013	103	2.62
As Jack remains haunted by Miriam, a man is found dead with his organs poorly harvested, leading him to believe that the Ripper has officially returned. Hannibal murders several people and harvests their organs in brutal fashion to be fed to guests at a dinner party, leading Will to conclude that the first murder was simply a botched harvesting. The BAU tracks down the first killer, a paramedic, as he operates on a second victim, and Hannibal saves the man's life while the killer is arrested. Will dreams of Abigail referring to him as her father as they sit with Cassie's corpse. As Hannibal deals with his naive and obsessed patient Franklyn Froideveaux, he asks Alana about her relationship with Will, who insists that she wants to keep things platonic, and flirts with her.
8	8	"Fromage"	Tim Hunter	Jennifer Schuur and Bryan Fuller	May 16, 2013	108	2.46
Alana turns down Will's advances. A musician is found dead with his body converted into a cello, and Franklyn tells Hannibal that his friend Tobias Budge, secretly a serial killer that uses his victim's organs as instrument parts, confessed to the murder. Hannibal confronts Tobias, who freely confesses and, recognizing what Hannibal is, feels they can bond. Hannibal gives Will Tobias's information without stating he is the killer, and while Will hallucinates the sounds of animals in pain and goes outside to investigate, Tobias kills Will's police backup and tries to kill him when he returns. A wounded Tobias escapes to Hannibal's office during a session with Franklyn, who Hannibal kills before also killing Tobias in a struggle. In the aftermath, Hannibal goes to his own psychologist, Bedelia Du Maurier, and admits that he feels responsible for Franklyn and that Will could be a true friend to him.
9	9	"Trou Normand"	Guillermo Navarro	Steve Lightfoot	May 23, 2013	109	2.69
As Will begins losing time, a totem pole made from dead bodies is found. Alana tells Will she regrets rejecting him so suddenly, but believes he is too "unstable" to have a relationship with. When the freshest and oldest victims on the pole are identified as father and son, BAU crime scene investigator Brian Zeller does some research and learns that the son was actually the product of an affair between the father's wife and Lawrence Wells, who Will and Jack track down. Wells confesses to killing the people that made up the pole and states it to be his "legacy," but is shocked to learn that he killed his own son. As the families of Hobbs's victims file a wrongful death claim against Abigail, Lounds asks to write a book about Hobbs and give her the royalties. Nicholas's body is found and Jack makes Abigail identify it, and he and Will separately conclude that she killed Nicholas. Will goes to Hannibal, who admits to helping her hide the body but asserts they need to protect her from Hobbs's legacy. Hannibal coaxes Abigail into admitting that she helped Hobbs lure and capture his victims.
10	10	"Buffet Froid"	John Dahl	Andy Black & Chris Brancato and Bryan Fuller	May 30, 2013	110	2.40
At the scene of a brutally murdered woman, Will imagines himself killing her instead of figuring out the method and contaminates the crime scene. In a session, Hannibal asks him to draw a normal clock to prove his grounding in reality, and does not show him when he draws it wrong. Hannibal takes Will to his neurologist colleague Donald Sutcliffe, who gives Will an MRI and determines that he has advanced encephalitis, which Hannibal asks to be kept from him. Suspecting that the killer was suffering from Cotard's syndrome and saw their friend, the victim, as an imposter, Will identifies her as Georgia Madchen when she breaks into his house. During another MRI, Will loses time and finds Sutcliffe murdered in Madchen's style. She breaks into his house again and he convinces her to stand down, having her placed in a hyperbaric chamber. A flashback reveals that Hannibal killed Sutcliffe so he could not tell Will about his diagnosis, and Madchen saw him but her Cotard's prevented her from seeing his face.
11	11	"Rôti"	Guillermo Navarro	Steve Lightfoot and Bryan Fuller & Scott Nimerfro	June 6, 2013	111	2.36
Gideon escapes custody and kills a doctor who wrote a paper on him before abducting Lounds and Chilton, taking them to the observatory and forcing the former to write an article on the murder to attract the Ripper's attention. In response, Hannibal kills another doctor who analyzed Gideon in an identical manner, but also severs his arm to indicate to Jack where Gideon is hiding. As Gideon vivisects Chilton, the FBI arrives, and he flees but is caught by an increasingly hallucinating Will. He takes Gideon to Hannibal, who convinces Will that he is hallucinating the entire thing. Will has a seizure and Hannibal sends Gideon after Alana, another doctor who analyzed him. Will wakes and goes after Gideon as he arrives at Alana's house, where Gideon laments being made to believe he was someone else. Seeing Gideon as Hobbs, Will shoots him and passes out. Chilton, Gideon and Will are hospitalized, while Hannibal expresses concern for Will to Du Maurier, who warns him not to get too involved.
12	12	"Relevés"	Michael Rymer	Chris Brancato and Bryan Fuller	June 13, 2013	112	2.10
Madchen informs Will that she saw Sutcliffe's killer, so Hannibal leaves a comb in her chamber, the static electricity of which ignites the oxygen and immolates her. Will labels the murders of Cassie, Marrisa, Sutcliffe and Madchen as the work of the "Copycat Killer". As Zeller and his colleague Jimmy Price find evidence that Abigail helped Hobbs and tell Jack, he confronts Du Maurier, believing Hannibal is concealing the brunt of Will's instability. She mentions that she is largely retired because Neal Frank, a patient referred to her by Hannibal, tried to kill her. As Will takes Abigail to Hobbs's cabin to investigate the Copycat, Jack confronts Hannibal, who claims he stalled reporting Will's mental state to properly diagnose him, and plays an out of context recording that frames Will as potentially responsible for Marissa's death. At the cabin, Will realizes Abigail helped Hobbs and suddenly wakes on a plane back to Virginia alone, while Abigail returns to the Hobbs residence and finds Hannibal. He tells her that he is a prolific serial killer and Jack knows of her guilt.
13	13	"Savoureux"	David Slade	Steve Lightfoot and Bryan Fuller & Scott Nimerfro	June 20, 2013	113	1.98
Waking from a dream where he hunts the stag and it turns into a wendigo with Hannibal's face, Will finds blood on his hands and vomits an ear into his sink. He is taken into custody when the remains are found to be Abigail's, and Alana runs the clock test on him, which he again fails. She compares it to the drawing he did for Hannibal, who has swapped it with that of a normal clock to convince Jack that Will is faking instability. The Copycat's victims' remains are found fashioned into Will's fishing lures, and he escapes custody and goes to Hannibal, who has a session with Will where he outlines how it is possible for him to have committed the murders and forgotten. They go to the Hobbs residence, where Will realizes Hannibal called Hobbs and is the actual Copycat, having been manipulating him since they met. Before he can kill Hannibal, Jack arrives and shoots him. Hannibal has dinner with Du Maurier, who implies knowledge of his manipulations of his patients, and later visits Will, incarcerated at the Baltimore State Hospital for the Copycat killings, including Abigail's murder.

== Production ==
=== Development ===
In September 2011, Gaumont International Television launched as an independent studio in Los Angeles. As part of its launch, the studio announced development on a project named Hannibal, which would cover the relationship between Will Graham and Hannibal Lecter, characters based on Thomas Harris' novels, with Bryan Fuller serving as developer, showrunner and executive producer. In November 2011, NBC acquired the series, with potential of ordering 13 episodes based on the strength of the pilot. When questioned about the dark nature of the character, NBC President Robert Greenblatt said, "it's part of the mix. I mean, look at Criminal Minds. That's a pretty dark show. I think it's dark with a bit of a... Well A, it's pre-sold. But it also has a kind of fantastical element to it, you know? It's a little mythic, that character."

In February 2012, NBC officially gave the series a 13-episode series order based on Fuller's script. One month later, David Slade joined as executive producer and to direct the pilot. Fuller commented on working on the series on network television rather than on cable, "doing a cable model on network television gives us the opportunity not to dally in our storytelling because we have a lot of real estate to cover."

=== Writing ===
Fuller felt attracted to the concept based on a sentence found in Red Dragon, where Lecter tells Graham "You caught me essentially because you're crazy, too." Hugh Dancy also explained the role of Graham in catching Lecter, "There clearly has to be some movement in that area because I'm playing the world's greatest detector of serial killers, and at a certain point you'd start to wonder how the hell I got the job. But at the same time, Hannibal is not just the most intelligent but, in a sense, the most quick-witted man in the show. He's always that one step ahead."

Fuller stated that the series would explore Lecter's life before his incarceration as depicted in Red Dragon, "the audience knows who Hannibal is so we don't have to overplay his villainy. We get to subvert his legacy and give the audience twists and turns." He also called the series a "love story" between Will Graham and Hannibal Lecter, "we'll get to the bottom of exactly what that means over the course of the first two seasons. But we're taking our sweet precious time."

The series was envisioned as an exploration of horror. Fuller said, "We're reflecting where people's heads are in a certain way and that's part of the arts' responsibility in its role in society. Entertainment has a very strange and cloudy mirror that it holds up to society."

Regarding the level of graphic violence in the series compared to other series on the air, Fuller explained that the novels and films "have a certain pedigree of crime horror/thriller, in order to be true to that genre, we had to have a certain amount of graphic content to honor the source material, and also honor the expectations of the audience who are approaching the material realizing this is a horror icon. If we didn't have certain ingredients for that dish, then it really wouldn't be that dish." Fuller added that NBC was supportive of the series, recognizing the series' importance in honoring the characters and the source material with the only restrictions being partial nudity. One instance of this happened on the fifth episode, "Coquilles", where the camera showed a naked murdered couple, posed in praying positions with the flesh of their backs opened and strung to the ceiling to give them the appearance of wings. NBC objected to the scene, citing that they "saw their butt cracks." To compensate, Fuller offered to add more blood to the scene and cover the cracks, which NBC accepted.

=== Casting ===
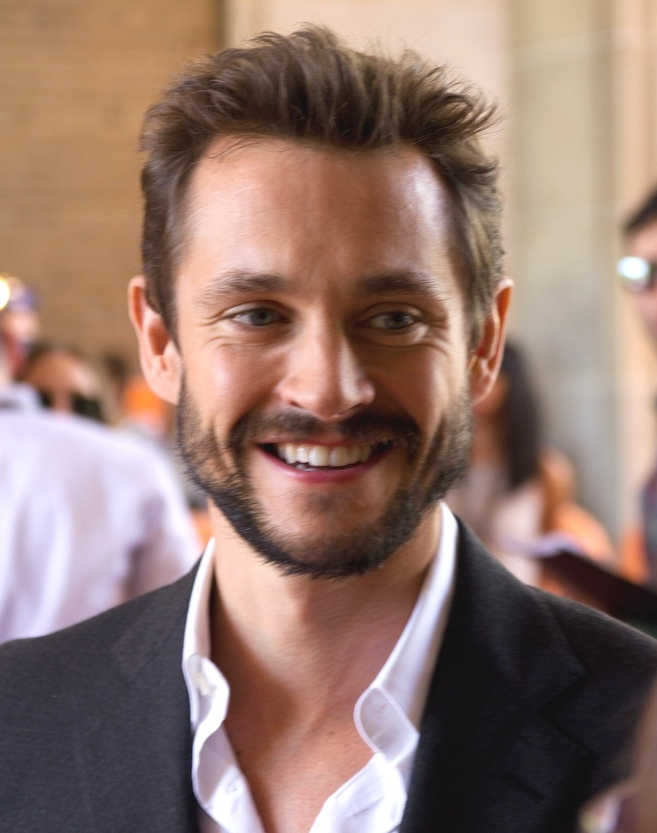
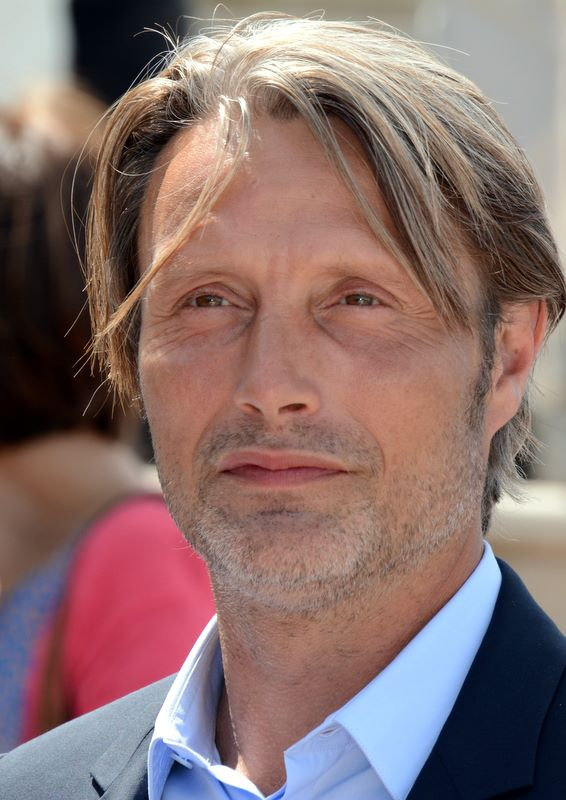
Hugh Dancy (left) and Mads Mikkelsen (right) star as the lead characters of the series, Will Graham and Hannibal Lecter.

In March 2012, Hugh Dancy joined the series as Will Graham. Dancy already watched many of the films featuring Hannibal Lecter but was unfamiliar with Will Graham when he read the script. He said he was convinced to take the role after having a talk with Bryan Fuller where he detailed future seasons, "I realized that he had an enormous and expansive imagining of this world and the characters. From that conversation on, I was hooked."

In June 2012, Mads Mikkelsen was announced to play Hannibal Lecter. Mikkelsen viewed Anthony Hopkins' portrayal of Lecter "as close as you can come to the devil, to Satan". After meeting with Fuller, he accepted the role, quoting "Hamlet has been played so many times — to perfection — but that shouldn't stop anyone else from doing something else with Hamlet." Mikkelsen described his character, "if you're playing the bad guy, you have to find what you like about them. The character, in this case, is quite elaborate. He's an art collector, he loves the opera. He finds life beautiful, on the threshold of death." In December 2012, Anthony Hopkins was asked about him and he replied with an advice for Mikkelsen, "Play him as totally sane. Play him as ordinary. Don't try to be evil."

In July 2012, Laurence Fishburne joined as Jack Crawford, "the agent-in-charge at the Behavioral Science Unit of the FBI who is tasked with tracking down a certain flesh-eating serial killer." The next month, Caroline Dhavernas joined the series as Alana Bloom, "a psychiatric protege of Hannibal Lecter's who teaches psychology at Georgetown University and is consulting with the FBI on criminal profiling when she introduces her mentor to Jack Crawford." Later, Hettienne Park rounded up the main cast as Beverly Katz, "a bright-eyed yet weary crime scene investigator who specializes in working with fibers. She's part of a team of three who piece evidence together."

In August 2012, Aaron Abrams joined the series as Brian Zeller, "one of three crime scene investigators working with the agency." A few days later, Lara Jean Chorostecki joined in the recurring role of Freddie Lounds, who was described as "more sophisticated in her manipulations than her male predecessors, but no less daring, making her a foil for not only Will Graham, but Hannibal Lecter and Jack Crawford, as well." In September 2012, Scott Thompson joined to play Jimmy Price, "the third member of the FBI crime scene investigation team headed by Jack Crawford, the head of the FBI's behavioral science unit. Jimmy specializes in fingerprinting and spatter patterns at crime scenes." In October 2012, Gina Torres joined the series in the recurring role of Bella, Jack Crawford's wife. The next month, Raúl Esparza joined to play Frederick Chilton in a recurring role. The same day, Anna Chlumsky joined to portray Miriam Lass, "a young FBI trainee under the tutelage of Laurence Fishburne's Jack Crawford." In December 2012, Gillian Anderson joined to play an original character, Bedelia Du Maurier, Hannibal Lecter's therapist.

Among guest stars, Chelan Simmons appeared in "Amuse-Bouche" as Gretchen Speck, reprising her role from Fuller's series, Wonderfalls. Molly Shannon guest starred in "Oeuf" as the main antagonist, with her role being kept in secret when it was reported. Ellen Greene, having worked with Fuller on Pushing Daisies, appeared in "Sorbet" as Mrs. Komeda, "a novelist and member of Boston's cultural elite. She's also a pal of the titular cannibal, Dr. Lecter which should protect her from becoming his lunch." Lance Henriksen guest starred in "Trou Normand" as Lawrence Wells, the main antagonist of the episode. Ellen Muth, who worked with Fuller on Dead Like Me, appeared in "Buffet Froid" and "Relevés" as Georgia Madchen.

=== Filming ===
The season began filming on August 27, 2012.

== Release ==
=== Broadcast ===
A few months after getting the 13-episode series order, NBC was reportedly considering having the show premiere as a mid-season replacement during the 2012–13 United States network television schedule. By January 2013, NBC considered having the series premiere at the end of the season or airing during the summer. In February 2013, NBC confirmed that the series would premiere on April 4, 2013, taking over the Thursday at 10:00 pm timeslot held by the recently cancelled Do No Harm.

On April 29, 2013, KSL-TV, NBC's television station affiliate in Salt Lake City, announced that they would no longer air the series after receiving complaints from viewers, citing the series' "extensive graphic nature."

==== Episode removal ====
The fourth episode, "Oeuf", was scheduled to air on April 25, 2013. However, six days before the airing, the episode was pulled from the schedule at the request of Fuller, with the fifth episode, "Coquilles", airing instead. The episode was removed as a result of the Sandy Hook Elementary School shooting, which occurred four months prior. As the episode involved children being brainwashed to kill their families, Fuller said "I didn't want to have anyone come to the show and have a negative experience" with the episode. He further added, "it was the associations that came with the subject matter that I felt would inhibit the enjoyment of the overall episode. It was my own sensitivity." NBC later broke the episode into a webisode, with portions of the episode being available to watch on NBC.com. A few months later, the episode was available to watch on iTunes and Amazon Video.

In June 2013, Fuller was asked by Alan Sepinwall about his decision, he replied "in retrospect, it would have been fine to air, but at that time, I feel like that was the informed decision to be cognizant of what was happening in the nation regarding children and violence and particularly gun violence."

=== Marketing ===
In October 2012, the first images of the series were revealed. On February 16, 2013, a first poster and trailer for the series was released. On March 30, 2013, the cast and crew attended the 2013 WonderCon to promote the series and screen the first two episodes.

=== Home media release ===
The season was released on Blu-ray and DVD in region 2 on September 2, 2013, in region 1 on September 24, 2013, and in region 4 on September 25, 2013.

On June 5, 2020, the season was available for streaming on Netflix. It exited the service on June 4, 2021.

== Reception ==
=== Viewers ===
Viewership and ratings per episode of Hannibal season 1
No.	Title	Air date	Rating/share (18–49)	Viewers (millions)	DVR (18–49)	DVR viewers (millions)	Total (18–49)	Total viewers (millions)
1	"Apéritif"	April 4, 2013	1.6/5	4.36	1.1	2.41	2.7	6.77
2	"Amuse-Bouche"	April 11, 2013	1.7/5	4.38	1.1	2.37	2.8	6.74
3	"Potage"	April 18, 2013	1.4/4	3.51	1.0	2.07	2.4	5.58
4	"Oeuf"	Unaired	—N/a	—N/a	—N/a	—N/a	—N/a	—N/a
5	"Coquilles"	April 25, 2013	1.0/3	2.40	0.9	1.81	1.9	4.20
6	"Entrée"	May 2, 2013	1.1/3	2.61	0.9	—N/a	2.0	—N/a
7	"Sorbet"	May 9, 2013	1.1/3	2.62	0.8	—N/a	1.9	—N/a
8	"Fromage"	May 16, 2013	1.1/5	2.46	1.1	1.94	2.1	4.39
9	"Trou Normand"	May 23, 2013	1.0/3	2.69	0.9	1.63	1.9	4.24
10	"Buffet Froid"	May 30, 2013	1.0/3	2.40	—N/a	—N/a	—N/a	—N/a
11	"Rôti"	June 6, 2013	0.9/3	2.36	—N/a	—N/a	—N/a	—N/a
12	"Relevés"	June 13, 2013	0.7/2	2.10	—N/a	—N/a	—N/a	—N/a
13	"Savoureux"	June 20, 2013	0.8/2	1.98	—N/a	—N/a	—N/a	—N/a

=== Critical reviews ===
The season received extremely positive reviews from critics. On review aggregator website Rotten Tomatoes, the first season received an approval rating of 82% based on 67 reviews, with an average rating of 7.70/10. The site's critical consensus reads, "Hannibal caters to an intellectual audience that prefers plenty of gore in its psychological thrillers, with a polished presentation of madness." On Metacritic, the first season scored 70 out of 100 based on 32 reviews, which constitutes "generally favorable" reviews.

Jeff Jensen of Entertainment Weekly gave the season an "A−" grade, writing "there is something to be said about caring about the internal lives of human beings and taking seriously the issue of how horror — fictional or all to real — impacts the imagination. In fact, Hannibal has been saying something about these murky matters all season long, and often quite artfully. My compliments to the chef." Emily St. James of The A.V. Club wrote, "Hannibal is a great show for other reasons but the thread uniting all of it is this fascination with death. Death is too often facile on television, a thing that happens to a guest character so the regulars can swoop in and save the day. Fuller, however, has been obsessed with death as long as he's been making television, and he's funneled that sensibility into a series that had every reason to be a cheap cash-in and has, instead, turned into one of TV’s best shows."

==== Critics' top ten lists ====
The season appeared in many "Best of 2013" lists.

2013
- No. 2 Slant
- No. 2 Vulture
- No. 4 Filmmaker Magazine
- No. 7 Houston Chronicle
- No. 8 IndieWire
- No. 9 HitFix
- No. 9 TV Guide
- – IGN

=== Awards and accolades ===
Year	Award	Category	Nominee(s)	Result
2013	Online Film & Television Association Awards	Best Guest Actress in a Drama Series	Gillian Anderson	Nominated
2013	Online Film & Television Association Awards	Best New Theme Song in a Series		Nominated
2013	Online Film & Television Association Awards	Best New Titles Sequence		Nominated
2014	IGN Awards	Best TV Actor	Hugh Dancy	Nominated
2014	IGN Awards	Best TV Horror Series		Won
2014	IGN Awards	Best TV Villain	Mads Mikkelsen	Nominated
2014	IGN Awards	Best TV Series		Nominated
2014	IGN Awards	Best New TV Series		Won
2014	Saturn Awards	Best Network Television Series		Won (Note: Tied with Revolution)
2014	Saturn Awards	Best Actor on Television	Hugh Dancy	Nominated
2014	Saturn Awards	Best Actor on Television	Mads Mikkelsen	Won
2014	Saturn Awards	Best Guest Star on Television	Gina Torres	Nominated
