= Oeuf (Hannibal) =

- Hannibal episode
- Episode no.: Season 1 Episode 4
- Directed by: Peter Medak
- Written by: Jennifer Schuur
- Cinematography by: Karim Hussain
- Editing by: Michael Doherty
- Production code: 104
- Original air date: Unaired
- Running time: 42 minutes

Guest appearances
- Scott Thompson as Special Agent Jimmy Price; Aaron Abrams as Special Agent Brian Zeller; Kacey Rohl as Abigail Hobbs; Molly Shannon as the Woman; Gina Torres as Phyllis "Bella" Crawford; Vladimir Cubrt as Garret Jacob Hobbs; Krista Patton as Louise Hobbs; Lindsey Connell as Marcy O'Halloran; Nicholas Bode as Christopher O'Halloran; Austin MacDonald as C.J. Lincoln; Brendan Heard as Jesse Turner; Sophie Holdstock as Mrs. Turner; Azeem Nathoo as Store Clerk; Duncan McLeod as Mr. O'Halloran

Episode chronology
← Previous "Potage"	Next → "Coquilles"
- Hannibal season 1

"Oeuf" (also known as "Œuf") is the fourth episode of the first season of the psychological thriller–horror series Hannibal. The episode was written by Jennifer Schuur, and directed by Peter Medak. The series is based on characters and elements appearing in Thomas Harris' novels Red Dragon and Hannibal, with focus on the relationship between FBI special investigator Will Graham (Hugh Dancy) and Dr. Hannibal Lecter (Mads Mikkelsen), a forensic psychiatrist destined to become Graham's most cunning enemy.

The episode was originally set to be broadcast on April 25, 2013. However, five days early, the episode was pulled from the United States broadcast schedule at the request of creator Bryan Fuller. The episode was still shown in other countries. This was not a result of the Boston Marathon bombings as some reports have indicated, but was actually decided just hours beforehand, and was more likely due to the Sandy Hook Elementary School shooting. Fuller said of the decision, "With this episode, it wasn't about the graphic imagery or violence. It was the associations that came with the subject matter that I felt would inhibit the enjoyment of the overall episode. It was my own sensitivity... We want to be respectful of the social climate we're in right now". In lieu of a traditional broadcast, a portion of the episode was broken into a series of webisodes, which was made available through various online media outlets. The complete episode was later made available via iTunes and Amazon Video on April 29, 2013, and the episode appears in the order intended on the DVD and Blu-ray release.

The episode revolves around an investigation in which Graham and Lecter pursue a group of abducted boys who are killing their old families so they can "bond" with their new ones. They also discover that the boys are being brainwashed by an unnamed woman to kill their families. Meanwhile, Lecter seeks to help Abigail Hobbs cope with her trauma.

The episode received positive reviews although the subject matter of the episode caused a mixed response.

== Plot ==
Two families are found murdered, with both mothers killed last. The only link between the families is that they both have sons who have been on the missing persons list for approximately a year. Graham (Hugh Dancy) concludes these "lost boys" are killing their old families to bond more closely to their new family. Graham continues his sessions with Dr. Lecter (Mads Mikkelsen) and confides that even if he finds the boys, he will never be able to give them back what they gave away: their families. He also admits to having paternal feelings toward Abigail Hobbs (Kacey Rohl), which make him uncomfortable. Lecter's own interest in Abigail leads him to check her out of the hospital, against Dr. Bloom's (Caroline Dhavernas) wishes, and take her into his care. He gives her some tea made from psilocybin mushrooms to help with her traumatic dreams. Bloom helps Graham realize that the boys are under the influence of a powerful but unnamed mother figure (Molly Shannon) and uses footage from a convenience store security camera to track them to North Carolina in time to stop another young boy from murdering his family. While under the influence of the mushrooms, Abigails envisions Hannibal and Ms. Bloom as her own mother and father. Her father being Mr. Hobbs who had been killed early on in season 1. We also learn in this episode that for Jack Crawford's homelife with his spouse is very troubled, possibly due to how invested he is with his FBI career, which can take its toll on any marriage. We learn this as his wife has all but given up on having any children.

== Production ==
=== Casting ===
In October 2012, Molly Shannon was announced to guest star in the series, with her role being kept in secret. A few days later, Gina Torres joined the series in the recurring role of Bella, Jack Crawford's wife.

== Reception ==
=== Critical reviews ===
"Oeuf" received positive response from critics. Eric Goldman of IGN gave the episode a "great" 8.0 out of 10 and wrote, "There was plenty to admire in 'Oeuf.' I've seen a couple of my fellow TV journalists, including Alan Sepinwall and Matt Fowler, make the observation that the webisodes only underlined how enthralling and well written this show is, since it focused almost entirely on the characters. Hannibal, Jack, Will and the others in their circle, including Abigail and Alana, are a fascinating group and even knowing, in broad strokes, where this story heads, I'm absolutely riveted seeing it play out."

Molly Eichel of The A.V. Club wrote, "What I did really like about the family aspect of 'Œuf' was a minor branch of the theme that ended up being its strongest: the interactions of the BAU team. I've loved the interplay between Hettienne Park, Scott Thompson, and Aaron Abrams since the beginning. They're a family too, one bonded together by the horror that they've collectively experienced as dispassioned outsiders. They are funny and light; they add a levity I've always welcomed to the series. This was their episode, they don't get many considering the show's comparatively short run and the immense amount of ground it needed to cover in that period of time."
