= Amuse-Bouche (Hannibal) =

- Hannibal episode
- Episode no.: Season 1 Episode 2
- Directed by: Michael Rymer
- Written by: Jim Danger Grey
- Cinematography by: James Hawkinson
- Editing by: Stephen Philipson
- Production code: 102
- Original air date: April 11, 2013
- Running time: 42 minutes

Guest appearances
- Scott Thompson as Dr. Jimmy Price; Aaron Abrams as Special Agent Brian Zeller; Kacey Rohl as Abigail Hobbs; Lara Jean Chorostecki as Freddie Lounds; Aidan Devine as Eldon Stammets; Vladimir Cubrt as Garret Jacob Hobbs; Richard Chevolleau as Detective Pascal; Chelan Simmons as Gretchen Speck; Liam MacDonald as Troy; Graeme Jokic as Steve; Kaiman Torres as Jason; Michael Torontow as Pharmacist; Diana Johnstone as Nurse

Episode chronology
← Previous "Apéritif"	Next → "Potage"
- Hannibal season 1

"Amuse-Bouche" is the second episode of the first season of the psychological thriller–horror series Hannibal. The episode was written by Jim Danger Gray, and directed by Michael Rymer. It was first broadcast on April 11, 2013, on NBC. The series is based on characters and elements appearing in Thomas Harris' novels Red Dragon (1981) and Hannibal (1999), with focus on the relationship between FBI special investigator Will Graham (Hugh Dancy) and Dr. Hannibal Lecter (Mads Mikkelsen), a forensic psychiatrist destined to become Graham's most cunning enemy.

The episode revolves around Will Graham, who is now a special investigator for the FBI. He is recruited by Jack Crawford to inspect Garret Jacob Hobbs' cabin in the woods when they are assigned to a new case, nine bodies that were buried alive with mushrooms grown from their bodies. Upon finding evidence that the killer used medication to induce diabetic coma, the team realizes they may be looking for a pharmacist. Their attempts are thwarted by Freddie Lounds, a tabloid blogger who wants to get information at any cost to post on her blog. Graham's therapy with Lecter continues to evolve. The episode received positive response from critics, who praised Dancy and Mikkelsen's chemistry in the episode as well as the writing and character development.

== Plot ==
Graham (Hugh Dancy) has a nightmare in which he is confronted by Garret Jacob Hobbs (Vladimir Jon Cubrt) at a shooting range. He is awakened by Crawford (Laurence Fishburne), revealing that they are in Chippewa National Forest to investigate Hobbs's cabin. There, they find dead animals and antlers mounted on the walls. Crawford says that Abigail (Kacey Rohl), Hobbs' daughter, is a suspect in the case, with the possibility that Hobbs used her to attract the girls. Graham discovers a lock of hair in the floor, confirming that someone other than Hobbs was there. Elsewhere, a red-haired woman (Lara Jean Chorostecki) is revealed to possess pictures of the cabin which she uploads to a blog named "Tattlecrime.com".

After lecturing at the FBI Academy, Graham is informed by Crawford and Alana (Caroline Dhavernas) that he will need to be assessed by Dr. Lecter (Mads Mikkelsen) after the shooting. Despite Crawford's insistence, Lecter has Graham declared sane so he can return to work. Later, bodies are discovered in Elk Neck State Park; the bodies were buried alive while comatose and used to grow mushrooms. While Graham uses his ability to recreate the crime scene, the red-haired woman appears, taking pictures of the scenes and asking a police officer to reveal information. While using his ability, Graham discovers one of the bodies is still alive.

Graham returns to therapy with Lecter, who states that Hobbs may not be a problem for him and claims that maybe the killer wants a "connection". Their meeting is recorded by the red-haired woman, who is Lecter's next appointment. Despite using a false identity, Lecter guesses that she is Freddie Lounds, a tabloid blogger. He then learns that she recorded Graham's meeting with him and makes her delete the conversation. In the Behavioral Science Unit (BSU) labs, autopsies reveal that the bodies had kidney failure along with diabetes thanks to a change in medicines, leading to the conclusion that the killer must be a pharmacist. Graham and Crawford lead an FBI raid in a supermarket to confront a pharmacist named Eldon Stammets (Aidan Devine). Stammets escapes but Graham discovers a woman buried in the trunk of Stammet's car which he has filled with dirt.

When checking Stammets' browser history, the FBI discovers that he managed to escape due to information leaked on Tattlecrime.com. Crawford has his team raid Lounds' hotel room and confront her, ordering her to stop writing about Graham or face arrest for obstruction of justice. The next day, Lounds is confronted by the officer from the Elk Neck crime scene when the latter is killed by Stammets, who demands to talk to Graham. The police arrive and Lounds reveals that Stammets wants someone who thinks just like him (Graham), and that she told Stammets Abigail's location. Stammets tries to take Abigail from the hospital but is shot by Graham, who tells the killer that "he does not understand him". During his next session with Lecter, Graham states that he didn't see Hobbs' ghost this time and Lecter notes that it must be because he may feel that the killing felt good and that killing Hobbs felt "just." Lecter likens it to a feeling of being God, who kills people to feel "powerful".

== Production ==
=== Casting ===
In August 2012, Lara Jean Chorostecki joined in the recurring role of Freddie Lounds, who was described as "more sophisticated in her manipulations than her male predecessors, but no less daring, making her a foil for not only Will Graham, but Hannibal Lecter and Jack Crawford, as well." Fuller modeled the series' version of Lounds based on Rebekah Brooks. Chorostecki further described her character, "Freddie isn't just a foil, as would be so easy to dismiss her."

Chelan Simmons, who portrays Gretchen Speck-Horowitz in Fuller's show Wonderfalls, also appears in the episode, reverting to her maiden name after her divorce. This is the second time Simmons and Dhavernas collaborated as Dhavernas was the main character in Wonderfalls.

== Reception ==
=== Viewers ===
The episode was watched by 4.38 million viewers, earning a 1.7/5 in the 18-49 rating demographics on the Nielson ratings scale, ranking first on its timeslot and seventh for the night in the 18-49 demographics. This is a slight improvement over the pilot, which was watched by 4.36 million viewers with a 1.6/5 in the 18-49 demographics. This means that 1.7 percent of all households with televisions watched the episode, while 5 percent of all households watching television at that time watched it. With DVR factored in, the episode was watched by 6.74 million viewers with a 2.8 in the 18-49 demographics.

=== Critical reviews ===
"Amuse-Bouche" received positive response from critics. Eric Goldman of IGN gave the episode a "great" 8.5 out of 10 and wrote, "While the second episode of Hannibal did introduce a new 'killer of the week', I was also very happy to see plenty of fallout from what occurred in the pilot, as it became clear there was no easy 'well, that's all over' procedural vibe here."

Molly Eichel of The A.V. Club gave the episode a "B+" and wrote, "The overall sentiment of Hannibal, even from those critics that didn’t like it all that much, is that it's a visually stunning piece of television. Frankly, it's gorgeous: the oversaturation, the soft-focus dream sequences, the constant juxtaposition of Hannibal's pronouncements of creepiness with shots of delectable food (shooting food, by the way, is incredibly difficult so hats off to Hannibal DP James Hawkinson for making everything Lecter makes look so good). What got me in 'Amuse-Bouche,' though, was the growing fungus that is, in the mind of killer Elden Stammetz, meant to reach out and touch Will."

Alan Sepinwall of HitFix wrote, "It's a potent combination. The mushroom imagery is haunting enough that it maybe could have carried the episode on its own, but as just one element in an hour featuring lots of fallout from the Garrett Jacob Hobbs killing, the on-camera introduction of Fuller's version of Freddie Lounds(*), it's dynamite." Laura Akers of Den of Geek wrote, "This week's Amuse-Bouche, for instance, provided a morbidly fascinating crime: the perpetrator buried people alive (and kept them alive) to serve as fodder for fungus. The setup was intricate, and in a sense, beautiful - I looked forward to understanding the psychology of a man who would do such a thing."

== See also ==
- Amuse-bouche
