= Potage (Hannibal) =

- Hannibal episode
- Episode no.: Season 1 Episode 3
- Directed by: David Slade
- Story by: David Fury
- Teleplay by: David Fury; Chris Brancato; Bryan Fuller
- Cinematography by: James Hawkinson
- Editing by: Stephen Philipson
- Production code: 105
- Original air date: April 18, 2013
- Running time: 42 minutes

Guest appearances
- Kacey Rohl as Abigail Hobbs; Mark Rendall as Nicholas Boyle; Lara Jean Chorostecki as Freddie Lounds; Vladimir Cubrt as Garret Jacob Hobbs; Torianna Lee as Elise Nichols; Holly Deveaux as Marissa Schurr; Severn Thompson as Marissa's Mother; Krista Patton as Louise Hobbs; Brendan Halloran as Reporter #1; Steven Pigozzo as Reporter #2; Audra Gray as Reporter #3

Episode chronology
← Previous "Amuse-Bouche"	Next → "Oeuf"
- Hannibal season 1

"Potage" is the third episode of the first season of the psychological thriller–horror series Hannibal. The episode was written by David Fury, Chris Brancato and Bryan Fuller from a story by Fury, and directed by David Slade. It was first broadcast on April 18, 2013, on NBC. The series is based on characters and elements appearing in Thomas Harris' novels Red Dragon and Hannibal, with focus on the relationship between FBI special investigator Will Graham (Hugh Dancy) and Dr. Hannibal Lecter (Mads Mikkelsen), a forensic psychiatrist destined to become Graham's most cunning enemy.

The episode revolves around Abigail Hobbs, who was just awakened from coma. While Freddie Lounds tries to get the most information from her, Graham, Lecter and Bloom try to help her recover from the trauma after her father's attack. However, Crawford is still convinced that Abigail was involved with her father in the crimes of kidnapping and murdering the other girls. Besides, Abigail begins to feel attacked by the brother of one of the dead girls, who claims that she killed his sister.

The episode received positive comments from critics, who praised Rohl's performance in the show as well as Lecter's character development.

== Plot ==
Abigail (Kacey Rohl) awakens from her coma. Graham (Hugh Dancy) suspects that Garret Jacob Hobbs (Vladimir Cubrt), dubbed the Minnesota Shrike, killed eight girls, but not the one impaled on the deer's head; that, he maintains, was a victim of a copycat killer who was also the one to call Hobbs and warn him. Crawford (Laurence Fishburne) harbors suspicions that Abigail was somehow complicit in her father's killing spree, despite objections from Dr. Bloom (Caroline Dhavernas), Lecter (Mads Mikkelsen) and Graham. Lounds (Lara Jean Chorostecki) meets the brother of the impaled girl, Cassie Boyle, and reveals to him that Abigail is out of her coma. Lecter and Graham take Abigail to her home, where she and her neighbor Marissa Schurr are confronted by the brother of the impaled girl, Nicholas Boyle (Mark Rendall). Marissa holds him off by throwing stones at him until he runs due to seeing Hannibal and Graham. Hannibal would later use one of the stones, covered in a hint of blood, to have Nicholas Boyle on file for the death of Marissa Schurr.

The following day, Abigail is taken to her father's cabin, which she states to have been cleaned by her father to hide the evidence, by Hannibal, Bloom, and Graham, to find clues to the investigation and give Abigail a form of closure.

Blood drops from the roof, however, leads them to Marissa, dead and impaled on a deer's head. Graham, who was the first to find the body, proceeds to request a team to be sent to the cabin. Following that, Graham and Crawford have a brief argument as Crawford does not believe that the copycat killed Marissa. Meanwhile, Crawford makes Hannibal and Bloom leave the cabin along with Abigail to gather her belongings and leave Minnesota.

In her house, Abigail finds the hair of one of the murdered girls, or several of the girls, inside a pillow her father is said to have made. Boyle suddenly confronts her and she inadvertently kills him. Lecter discovers them and explains that the killing cannot be seen as self-defense. Lecter helps her cover up the murder, knocking Bloom out in the process, and further lays the blame on Boyle for the murders of his own sister and Marissa, and knocking out Bloom in an effort to go after Abigail. After this, Abigail realizes it was Lecter who made the call to her father, warning him that the FBI was after him. Lecter suggests that Abigail keep his secret in exchange for his hiding her murder, and Abigail agrees.

== Production ==
=== Writing ===
According to Fuller, the idea to have Abigail involved in her father's crimes came after David Fury said "Nobody's ever going to believe in a million years that Abigail Hobbs had anything to do with these murders, so we're kind of chasing a story that the audience isn't going to embrace, because they're going to know that Abigail Hobbs didn't help her father", to which Fuller responded "Unless she did."

== Reception ==
=== Viewers ===
The episode was watched by 3.51 million viewers, earning a 1.4/4 in the 18-49 rating demographics on the Nielson ratings scale, ranking second on its timeslot and eleventh for the night in the 18-49 demographics, behind Wife Swap, a rerun of Person of Interest, two episodes of Parks and Recreation, Glee, a rerun of 2 Broke Girls, a rerun of Two and a Half Men, American Idol and two reruns of The Big Bang Theory. This is a 20% decrease from the previous episode, which was watched by 4.38 million viewers with a 1.7/5 in the 18-49 demographics. This means that 1.4 percent of all households with televisions watched the episode, while 4 percent of all households watching television at that time watched it. With DVR factored in, the episode was watched by 5.58 million viewers with a 2.4 in the 18-49 demographics.

=== Critical reviews ===
"Potage" received positive response from critics. Eric Goldman of IGN gave the episode a "great" 8.6 out of 10 and wrote, "This was the third episode of Hannibal and it's really gratifying to see how things are moving along, with the show not falling into a set formula. There was no new killer this week - the story was all about Abigail and what occurred in the first episode with her father. And while we still haven't actually seen Hannibal kill onscreen, his sudden attack on Alana gave us our first look at what a scary, physical threat he can be, behind that calm, soft spoken demeanor."

Molly Eichel of The A.V. Club gave the episode a "B" and wrote, "Is evil hereditary? Could Abigail Hobbs have caught crazy from her murderous father? That's an assumption — made by Jack Crawford, Abigail's neighbors, the relatives of a possible victim, even Abigail herself — but if Abigail has inherited a nasty case of nuts, what does that make Will Graham? The irony inherent in 'Potage' is that those who think they are the ones capable of real harm, who have caught it from others, are damaged by circumstance, but it's the sanest-seeming among them, Hannibal Lecter, who is the one harboring the true demons. 'Potage' is the episode where the demons are let out to play, if for only a little bit."

Alan Sepinwall of HitFix wrote, "'Potage' did a strong job of continuing to explore the themes of the series (what it means to kill someone, the emotional toll it takes, etc.), and the relationship between Lecter and Will, and it continued the story of Garrett Jacob Hobbs through the story of his daughter Abigail. Though we've had a standalone killer in last week's mushroom man, it's important for the series to depict the lingering aftermath of these horrific crimes." Laura Akers of Den of Geek wrote, "But the question that Hannibal has been asking approaches the problem from a slightly different angle: 'Is Abigail Hobbs capable of doing this terrible thing?' The show has clearly established the guilt of her father, a serial killer who took the lives of eight girls who resembled his daughter. But this week's Potage focuses on the possibility that Abigail was not just his victim, but his accomplice."

== Production ==
Although it aired as the third episode of the series, it was produced as the fifth, as it has the production number "105" on the script.
