= Entrée (Hannibal) =

- Hannibal episode
- Episode no.: Season 1 Episode 6
- Directed by: Michael Rymer
- Story by: Kai Yu Wu
- Teleplay by: Kai Yu Wu; Bryan Fuller
- Cinematography by: James Hawkinson
- Editing by: Michael Doherty
- Production code: 107
- Original air date: May 2, 2013
- Running time: 42 minutes

Guest appearances
- Eddie Izzard as Dr. Abel Gideon (special guest star); Raúl Esparza as Dr. Frederick Chilton; Scott Thompson as Jimmy Price; Aaron Abrams as Brian Zeller; Anna Chlumsky as Miriam Lass; Lara Jean Chorostecki as Freddie Lounds; Mark Waters as Hospital Security; Darrin Brown as Inmate #1; Earl Antham Chrysostom as Inmate #2; Ana Shepherd as Nurse Shell

Episode chronology
| ← Previous "Coquilles" | Next → "Sorbet" |
- Hannibal season 1

"Entrée" is the sixth episode of the first season of the psychological thriller–horror series Hannibal. The episode was written by Kai Yu Wu and series creator Bryan Fuller from a story by Wu, and directed by Michael Rymer. It was first broadcast on May 2, 2013, on NBC. Although it was the seventh episode produced for the season, it was the sixth in scheduled order.

The series is based on characters and elements appearing in Thomas Harris' novels Red Dragon and Hannibal, with focus on the relationship between FBI special investigator Will Graham (Hugh Dancy) and Dr. Hannibal Lecter (Mads Mikkelsen), a forensic psychiatrist destined to become Graham's most cunning enemy. The episode revolves around an investigation on a criminally insane patient at a hospital named Dr. Abel Gideon, who claims to be the Chesapeake Ripper although the BAU team is hesitating on the veracity of his claims. The Ripper taunts Crawford by sending recorded messages from his missing FBI trainee, Miriam Lass.

According to Nielsen Media Research, the episode was seen by an estimated 2.61 million household viewers and gained a 1.1/3 ratings share among adults aged 18–49. The episode received extremely positive reviews from critics, who praised Mads Mikkelsen's performance, character development, the flashback sequences and the ending.

== Plot ==
At the Baltimore State Hospital for the Criminally Insane, an inmate named Dr. Abel Gideon (Eddie Izzard) murders a nurse after he appeared to be unconscious. Graham (Hugh Dancy) and Crawford (Laurence Fishburne) visit the hospital, where the administrator, Dr. Frederick Chilton (Raúl Esparza), makes some comments on Graham's "ability" that unnerve him. When they find the nurse's body, they find her in a manner reminiscent of the Chesapeake Ripper, who hasn't committed a murder in two years, the same number of years Gideon has been incarcerated. Bloom (Caroline Dhavernas) conducts an interview with Gideon, who does not give more details on his motivation and neither confirms or denies if he is the Ripper. Crawford visits Lecter (Mads Mikkelsen) at his office, expressing his concerns about his wife's health. Crawford is also haunted by memories of losing Miriam Lass (Anna Chlumsky), a trainee Crawford had consulting on the Ripper case two years previously when she suddenly disappeared. That night, Crawford receives a phone call from Miriam herself, who asks for help before her line dies.

Crawford and his team investigate the call. Crawford deduces that the Ripper called him and used a voice recorder to torment him, as he believes that Miriam is dead despite not finding her body. In an attempt to lure the Ripper out, Crawford has Freddie Lounds (Lara Jean Chorostecki) confirm on her tabloid that Gideon is the Ripper, as the real Ripper will reveal himself. Lecter reads the tabloid and is unnerved by its content. Crawford and Lounds talk with Gideon, who confesses to having killed Miriam. Crawford then receives the same recorded voice message on his phone, which comes from his house. During a dinner with Alana and Lecter, Chilton tells them he had suspected Gideon of being the Ripper; Lecter surmises that Chilton unintentionally planted the thought in Gideon's mind during a session, implying that, while Gideon is not the Ripper, he believes himself to be. Later, Crawford receives another phone call, which they trace to an old observatory. There, they find Miriam's cell phone clutched in the hand of a severed arm along with a note reading, "What do you see?".

Crawford talks with Lecter, who says the Ripper uses Miriam to taunt him, which in turn is negatively impacting Crawford's fears for his wife's safety. In a flashback, it is revealed that Miriam visited Lecter to ask about Jeremy Olmstead, whom he had come into contact with when working as an ER attendant and was the latest Ripper victim. While Lecter excuses himself, Miriam finds one of his sketches of the Wound Man, which precisely matches the manner in which Olmstead was murdered. Lecter sneaks up on her from behind and chokes her unconscious, revealing himself as the real Chesapeake Ripper.

== Production ==
=== Development ===
In April 2013, it was announced that the sixth episode of the series would be titled "Entrée", and was directed by Michael Rymer and written by Kai Yu Wu and series creator Bryan Fuller from a story by Wu. This was Fuller's 4th writing credit, Wu's first writing credit and Rymer's second directing credit.

=== Writing ===
Bryan Fuller stated that Reggie Lass from one of his series, Dead Like Me (played by Britt McKillip) was reinterpreted as Miriam Lass (played by Anna Chlumsky) for this series.

Lara Jean Chorostecki previewed her character's actions in the episodes, "We don't really know yet what went on with her and Lecter after he threatens her in the office. [...] Freddie certainly gets very close to the action."

Miriam's discovery of the Wound Man sketch on Lecter's office was an adaptation of the novel Red Dragon, although in the novel, is Will Graham who makes the connection. On the decision to switch characters, Fuller said, "We could no longer have Will Graham pick up a drawing of a wounded man, and go 'A-ha!' because it felt like that was a dynamic that was about these characters not knowing each other or having any sort of history with each other. Now that we've done that, we had to do something differently to see how Will Graham catches Hannibal Lecter or discovers his crimes. So it felt like as we were dealing with Jack Crawford struggling with the impending loss of his wife, to reflect on previous losses that give us a little bit of context with Jack Crawford and also Hannibal's history as the Chesapeake Ripper."

=== Casting ===
In November 2012, it was announced that Eddie Izzard would guest star as Dr. Abel Gideon, "an inmate at the Baltimore State Hospital for the Criminally Insane. Izzard's character is claiming to be 'the infamous Chesapeake Ripper.'" A few days later, Raúl Esparza joined the series to play Frederick Chilton in a recurring role. Later, Anna Chlumsky was announced to guest star as Miriam Lass, "a young FBI trainee under the tutelage of agent Jack Crawford."

== Reception ==
=== Viewers ===
The episode was watched by 2.61 million viewers, earning a 1.1/3 in the 18-49 rating demographics on the Nielson ratings scale. This means that 1.1 percent of all households with televisions watched the episode, while 3 percent of all households watching television at that time watched it. This is a 8% increase from the previous episode, which was watched by 2.40 million viewers with a 1.0/3 in the 18-49 demographics. With these ratings, Hannibal ranked third on its timeslot and thirteenth for the night in the 18-49 demographics, behind Wife Swap, Community, Parks and Recreation, The Office, Glee, Elementary, Person of Interest, Scandal, American Idol, Grey's Anatomy, Two and a Half Men, and The Big Bang Theory.

With DVR factored in, the episode was watched with a 2.0 in the 18-49 demographics.

=== Critical reviews ===
"Entrée" received extremely positive response from critics. Eric Goldman of IGN gave the episode an "amazing" 9 out of 10 and wrote, "There was a lot to enjoy here for fans of Thomas Harris' Lecter series. The manner in which Miriam meets Hannibal and discovers who he really is was very much a parallel to how Will meets him in Red Dragon. Obviously, the events of this series won't allow for that specific encounter to take place, so it was fun to have it given to Miriam instead – even though it was sad to see it end with her death, instead of Hannibal's capture."

Molly Eichel of The A.V. Club gave the episode a "B+" and wrote, "'Entrée', in the old-school, European sense, is the perfect name for this episode. While it's come to mean the principal component of a meal colloquially, an entrée is literally meant to be the entrance into the main course. That's what this episode is, an explicit entrance to a plot element — Hannibal equals killer — that will likely fuel the rest of the series. Hannibal has reveled in relative subtlety until now, but just in case the audience had any doubt that Hannibal Lecter was a bad dude with a mean manipulative streak, 'Entrée' should clear all that ambiguity up."

Laura Akers of Den of Geek wrote, "I'll honestly be disappointed if this means that we now have an unobstructed view of the machinations of Dr. Lecter. The hints, suspicious dinners, and barely - the reactions have not, unlike the elk scenes, worn out their welcome. Rarely has not knowing been this much fun. Which is why I'm still praying that, any evidence to the contrary, this is still Christmas Eve. I'm not quite ready to open my presents yet." Kevin Fitzpatrick of ScreenCrush wrote, "All in all, a thoroughly satisfying episode that fans of the series are sure to geek out over, while offering up a succulent 'Entrée' for newcomers to enjoy."
