= Buffet Froid (Hannibal) =

- Hannibal episode
- Episode no.: Season 1 Episode 10
- Directed by: John Dahl
- Written by: Andy Black; Chris Brancato; Bryan Fuller
- Cinematography by: James Hawkinson
- Editing by: Michael Doherty
- Production code: 110
- Original air date: May 30, 2013
- Running time: 44 minutes

Guest appearances
- Scott Thompson as Jimmy Price; Aaron Abrams as Brian Zeller; Ellen Muth as Georgia Madchen; John Benjamin Hickey as Dr. Sutcliffe; Hilary Jardine as Beth LeBeau; Krista Bridges as Jocelyn Madchen

Episode chronology
← Previous "Trou Normand"	Next → "Rôti"
- Hannibal season 1

"Buffet Froid" is the tenth episode of the first season of the psychological thriller–horror series Hannibal. The episode was written by Andy Black, executive producer Chris Brancato and series creator Bryan Fuller, and directed by John Dahl. It was first broadcast on May 30, 2013, on NBC.

The series is based on characters and elements appearing in Thomas Harris' novels Red Dragon and Hannibal, with focus on the relationship between FBI special investigator Will Graham (Hugh Dancy) and Dr. Hannibal Lecter (Mads Mikkelsen), a forensic psychiatrist destined to become Graham's most cunning enemy. The episode revolves around a murder in a house, where the victim drowned in her blood and her face was cut into a Glasgow smile. As BAU tries to find the killer, Graham's perception of reality continues deteriorating.

According to Nielsen Media Research, the episode was seen by an estimated 2.40 million household viewers and gained a 1.0/3 ratings share among adults aged 18–49. The episode received positive reviews from critics, who praised Hugh Dancy's performance, Ellen Muth's guest appearance, tension, exploration of mental illness and cinematography.

== Plot ==
In Greenwood, Delaware, after fixing a hole in her roof, Beth LeBeau (Hilary Jardine) is attacked by a home intruder and drowns in her own blood as a result of her face being cut into a Glasgow smile. During a session, Graham (Hugh Dancy) tells Lecter (Mads Mikkelsen) that he feels he is losing perception of reality. Lecter assigns him to draw a numbered clock; Graham views it as a normal clock but Lecter notes that Graham drew the numbers out of order on one side of the clock. Graham's mental state continues to sharply decline; he loses hours at a time and a vivid hallucination causes him to contaminate the crime scene at LeBeau's house. Crawford (Laurence Fishburne) questions his sanity, but Graham states he is fine.

Lecter refers him to a neurologist acquainted with Lecter, Dr. Sutcliffe (John Benjamin Hickey). An MRI reveals that Graham is suffering anti-NMDA receptor encephalitis, but Lecter pressures Sutcliffe into telling Graham that he found no neurological problems so that Lecter can continue to analyze him. Graham returns to LeBeau's house, where he is attacked by her killer (Ellen Muth), who manages to escape. Graham suddenly finds himself in the woods, having lost the perception of fantasy and reality. He calls Katz (Hettienne Park) to help him see if the killer was real. Both confirm he was indeed attacked by the killer, whose skin of her arm fell off.

While at a session, Lecter deduces the killer must have Cotard's syndrome, a delusional disorder that has her convinced she is actually dead and takes away her ability to identify people's faces. The killer stalks Graham's house that night, watching him outside his window. The next day, BAU identifies the killer as Georgia Madchen, who suffers many mental illnesses and has a violent background. She mutilated LeBeau's face because she was deluded into thinking LeBeau was an untrustworthy stranger. During another MRI scan, Graham finds the hospital empty and Sutcliffe murdered in his office. Graham reaches out to Georgia and manages to convince her that she is alive and not alone. Georgia is brought in for medical treatment. The episode ends with a flashback, which reveals that Lecter killed Sutcliffe and then handed over the scissors to Georgia, who just walked into his office. Georgia is unable to see Lecter, viewing him as a faceless person.

== Production ==
=== Development ===
In May 2013, it was announced that the tenth episode of the series would be titled "Buffet Froid", and was directed by John Dahl and written by Andy Black, executive producer Chris Brancato and series creator Bryan Fuller. This was Fuller's 7th writing credit, Black's first writing credit, Brancato's second writing credit and Dahl's first directing credit.

=== Casting ===
In January 2013, it was reported that Ellen Muth would guest star as a character named "Georgia". Georgia "George" Lass (also played by Muth), having first appeared in Dead Like Me, was reinterpreted as Georgia Madchen. This similarity is furthered by their last names: "lass" is an English synonym for girl while "Mädchen" is a German word meaning the same. In another nod to Georgia Lass being a reaper (therefore both dead and alive) in Dead Like Me, in Hannibal Georgia Madchen is a killer who suffers from numerous medical conditions including Cotard's syndrome, a delusion disorder that has her convinced she is actually dead. When the writers were breaking the episode, Fuller immediately thought of Muth to play Georgia. He also said, "what was interesting about having Ellen on the show was that there was actually an opportunity to deconstruct our previous collaboration in a very unexpected way. Her character has the same name and is a reinterpretation of that character and, in fashion, that was sort of the Mulholland Drive-ing of Dead Like Me."

== Reception ==
=== Viewers ===
The episode was watched by 2.40 million viewers, earning a 1.0/3 in the 18-49 rating demographics on the Nielson ratings scale. This means that 1 percent of all households with televisions watched the episode, while 3 percent of all households watching television at that time watched it. This was a 11% decrease from the previous episode, which was watched by 2.69 million viewers with a 1.0/3 in the 18-49 demographics. With these ratings, Hannibal ranked third on its timeslot and tenth for the night in the 18-49 demographics, behind Does Someone Have to Go?, an Elementary rerun, Wipeout, Motive, Rookie Blue, a Person of Interest rerun, Mike & Molly, Hell's Kitchen, and a The Big Bang Theory rerun.

=== Critical reviews ===
"Buffet Froid" received positive reviews from critics. Eric Goldman of IGN gave the episode a "great" 8.5 out of 10 and wrote, "In the meantime, having the scary-sad Georgia come face to blurry face with Hannibal was another wonderfully evocative moment for the series. It's going to be exciting seeing the final episodes of Season 1 play out... more so now that we know Season 2 is a certainty!"

Molly Eichel of The A.V. Club gave the episode a "B" and wrote, "One of the reasons I like Hannibal's decision to keep with procedural pace, even though it has more than enough serial plot to go around, is that the procedure is never really consistent. Any student of the procedural can generally pick out the killer as soon as they are introduced. The classics rely on formula. Hannibal's episodic deaths, and those who commit those deaths, are never truly consistent. Many times, the aftermath of the murder is of more interest than the violence itself, which bucks the current trend of ultra-gory television. Georgia, like Eddie Izzard's Dr. Abel Gideon, is imbued with menace because we see her stalk Beth Labeaux before ultimately slitting open her face. I love this lack of consistency."

Alan Sepinwall of HitFix wrote, "The idea of our hero having some kind of emotional parallel with the killer/victim/patient/client is a standard trope in most procedurals, and Hannibal is on some level a procedural. But the show has generally had a more delicate hand with this stuff, even though there are often connections between the killer of the week and either Will, Hannibal, or both." Laura Akers of Den of Geek wrote, "With the abrupt turnaround in Lecter's character, the writers are simply continuing the pattern they've already set. There are no easy answers on this show. In fact, there may well be no answers at all. And really, that's a big part of the pleasure of Hannibal. For the writers who will get the opportunity to give us a second season, Georgia's mother summed up not just the failings of the psychiatric profession, but the secret of Hannibal's success: 'It's rarely about finding solutions. It’s more about managing expectations.'" Kevin Fitzpatrick of ScreenCrush wrote, "For as much of a new layer to Hannibal as the episode uncovers in the good doctor denying Will the truth of his condition, a number of questions arise over how the series intends to continue on with Will as an FBI profiler, given the lengthy measures taken to portray its adverse effects on the protagonist. From its very pilot Hannibal has ranked above the usual TV conventions, though the series could have difficulty maintaining a plausible status quo in pushing Will any further."

=== Accolades ===
TVLine named Hugh Dancy the "Performer of the Week" for the week of June 1, 2013, for his performance in the episode. The site wrote, "Each time Graham's mind took another disturbing detour, the actor conveyed a new level of freaked-out. His eyes darted. He paced. He pleaded with Hannibal for answers. And by the time Will shouted his name, the time and his location in a vain attempt to root himself in reality, Dancy had elegantly worked his character into a panic nearly as scary as Dr. Lecter himself."
