= Apéritif (Hannibal) =

- Hannibal episode
- Episode no.: Season 1 Episode 1
- Directed by: David Slade
- Written by: Bryan Fuller
- Cinematography by: James Hawkinson
- Editing by: Art Jones
- Production code: 101
- Original air date: April 4, 2013
- Running time: 42 minutes

Guest appearances
- Scott Thompson as Dr. Jimmy Price; Aaron Abrams as Special Agent Brian Zeller; Dan Fogler as Franklyn Froideveaux; Kacey Rohl as Abigail Hobbs

Episode chronology
← Previous —	Next → "Amuse-Bouche"
- Hannibal season 1

"Apéritif" is the series premiere of the psychological thriller–horror series Hannibal. The episode was written by Bryan Fuller, and directed by David Slade. It was first broadcast on April 4, 2013, on NBC. The series is based on characters and elements appearing in Thomas Harris' novels Red Dragon and Hannibal, with focus on the relationship between FBI special investigator Will Graham (Hugh Dancy) and Dr. Hannibal Lecter (Mads Mikkelsen), a forensic psychiatrist destined to become Graham's most cunning enemy.

The episode revolves around Will Graham, an FBI profiler who is able to sense and think like any other serial killer during a crime scene and recreate their murders. When college girls are reported to be missing and all are said to be kidnapped by the same person, Graham is recruited by BSU Special Agent Jack Crawford for help. After one of the girls shows up in her house dead, Graham and Crawford receive help from Dr. Hannibal Lecter, a psychiatrist who has been dealing with sociopaths. However, unbeknownst to Graham, Crawford and the FBI, Lecter is a cannibal who has been killing and retrieving victims in order to make them his personal meal.

The pilot received a mostly positive reception from critics, who praised many aspects including the acting and writing in the episode. Some critics also compared the show to other psychological thriller shows that aired at the same time such as The Following and Bates Motel, noting that Hannibal managed to surpass them.

== Plot ==
Will Graham (Hugh Dancy), an FBI profiler, surveys and recreates a crime scene in which two suburban homeowners, Mr. and Mrs. Marlow, have been brutally murdered. Later, after Graham gives a lecture at the FBI Academy, he is approached by BSU Special Agent Jack Crawford (Laurence Fishburne), who wants his help in investigating a serial killer who has recently abducted eight college girls. Graham and Crawford arrive at Duluth, Minnesota, to visit the parents of the most recent victim, Elise Nichols, for questioning. Inspecting her bedroom, they discover Elise's corpse in her bed. As the FBI investigates the scene, Graham tries to reenact the events when he is interrupted by Special Agent Beverly Katz (Hettienne Park), who reveals that they have found antler velvet in Elise's wounds. Taking their case back to the examination labs in Quantico, Virginia, Katz finds a curl of metal in Elise's clothes. Graham deduces that the victim was killed by being mounted on antlers. They also discover that the victim had her liver taken out but was then put back in the body, having liver cancer. The team discovers they are after a cannibal.

Graham begins to suffer nightmares with Elise, haunted by his "ability". Crawford consults Alana Bloom (Caroline Dhavernas) for help and she recommends him to visit Dr. Hannibal Lecter (Mads Mikkelsen), a psychiatrist. Crawford takes Lecter to Quantico, where he meets Graham and agrees to help him. A new body appears in Hibbing, Minnesota, mounted on top of a deer's head in an open field with her lungs removed. The police have nicknamed the murderer the "Minnesota Shrike". Identifying this murder to be the work of a copycat killer, Graham deduces that the Minnesota Shrike has a daughter who is about to leave and the killer can't accept it. Meanwhile, Lecter is shown preparing the lungs and eats them at dinner. In conversation, with Lecter, Graham remarks that the copycat killing felt as though it were "gift-wrapped" as an inverse to the Shrike's killings to allow Graham to figure out how to profile them correctly.

Lecter and Graham meet and investigate a construction site which may be connected to the murder. They find that a man, Garret Jacob Hobbs (Vladimir Jon Cubrt) has resigned from his job and meets Graham's profile. While Graham is distracted, Lecter makes an anonymous call to Hobbs, warning him that "they know". Later, Graham and Lecter arrive at Hobbs' house in Bloomington, Minnesota, where they see Hobbs killing his wife and leaving her on the doorstep to die. Graham enters the house as Hobbs throws his wife out the door with her throat cut; after failing to save her, Graham sees Hobbs holding his daughter Abigail (Kacey Rohl) hostage with a knife before shooting him multiple times in the chest, but not before he cuts part of Abigail's throat. Before dying, Hobbs taunts Graham, saying, "See? See?" Abigail is taken to the hospital. The episode ends as Will sits on Abigail's hospital room along with Lecter, who is sleeping and holding her hand.

== Production ==
=== Development ===
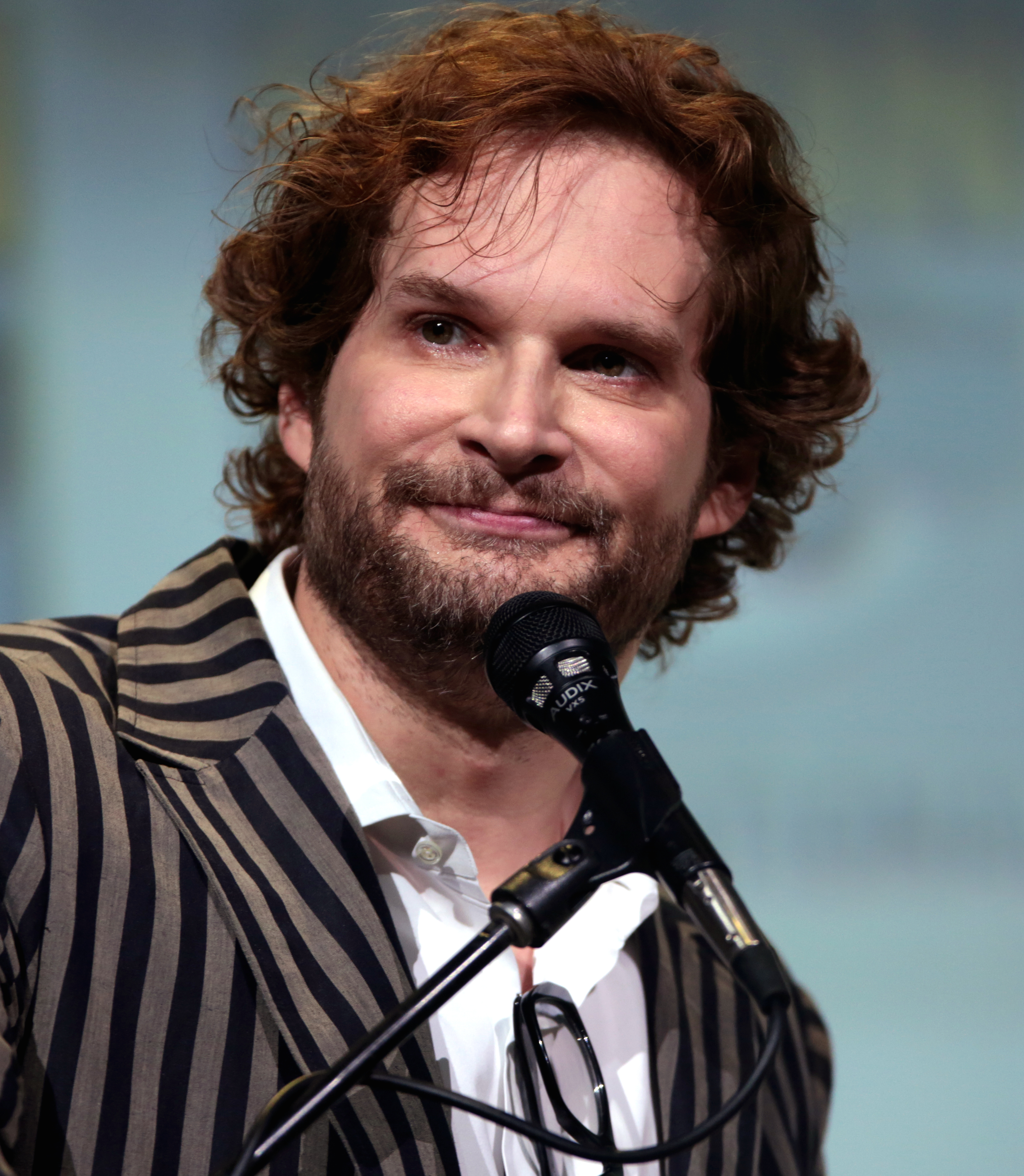
Bryan Fuller (pictured in 2016) wrote the episode.

NBC began developing a Hannibal series in 2011 and former head of drama Katie O'Connell brought in her long-time friend Bryan Fuller (who had previously served as a writer-producer on NBC's Heroes) to write a pilot script in November. NBC gave the series a financial commitment before Fuller had completed his script. On February 14, 2012, NBC bypassed the pilot stage of development by giving the series a 13-episode first season based solely on the strength of Fuller's script. The series went into production quickly thereafter. David Slade, who had previously directed the pilot for NBC's Awake, directed the first episode and serves as an executive producer. José Andrés is the series' "culinary cannibal consultant" and advises the crew on proper procedure for preparing human flesh for consumption.

=== Writing ===
Fuller discussed the limited episode order and the continuing story arc he envisions for the series. "Doing a cable model on network television gives us the opportunity not to dally in our storytelling because we have a lot of real estate to cover". Speaking specifically about the Lecter character, Fuller said:

There is a cheery disposition to our Hannibal. He's not being telegraphed as a villain. If the audience didn't know who he was, they wouldn't see him coming. What we have is Alfred Hitchcock's principle of suspense—show the audience the bomb under the table and let them sweat when it's going to go boom.

He went on to call the relationship between Graham and Lecter as "really a love story", saying "As Hannibal has said [to Graham] in a couple of the movies, 'You're a lot more like me than you realize'. We'll get to the bottom of exactly what that means over the course of the first two seasons". Regarding the series' influences, Fuller stated: "When I sat down to the script, I was very consciously saying, 'What would David Lynch do with a Hannibal Lecter character? What sort of strange, unexpected places would he take this world?' I'm a great admirer of his work and his aesthetic and his meticulous sound design. Those were all components that I felt very strongly needed to be part of our Hannibal Lecter story. Between Lynch and Kubrick, there's a lot of inspiration."

As an easter egg, Fuller later confirmed that the couple murdered at the beginning of the episode were victims of Francis Dolarhyde, the main antagonist of Red Dragon. Dolarhyde would later make his series debut in the episode "The Great Red Dragon", portrayed by Richard Armitage.

=== Casting ===
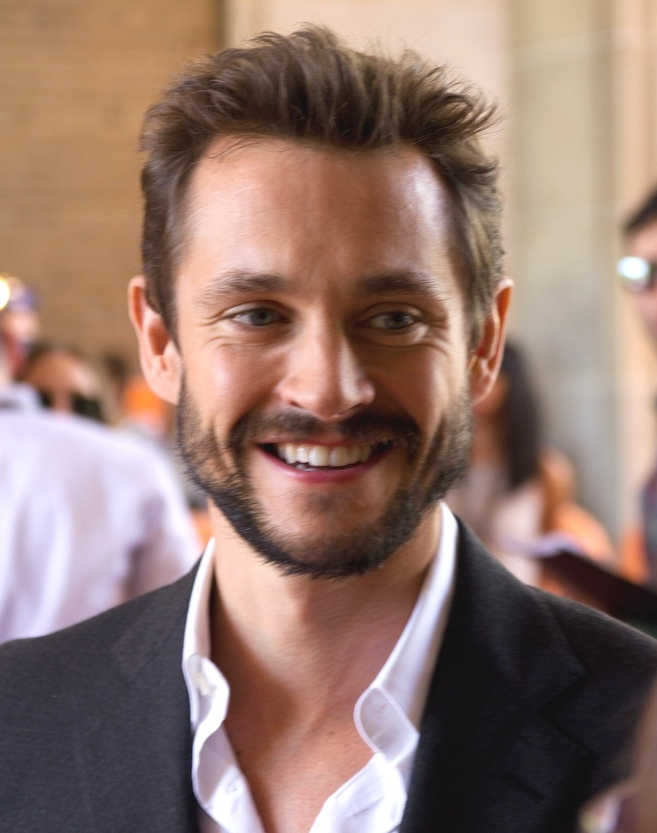
Hugh Dancy (pictured in 2011) was the first actor to be cast.

English actor Hugh Dancy was the first actor to be cast, taking on the lead role of FBI criminal profiler Will Graham, who seeks help from Lecter in profiling and capturing serial killers. In June 2012, Danish actor Mads Mikkelsen was cast as Lecter. Soon after this, actor Laurence Fishburne was cast as FBI Behavioral Sciences Unit commander Jack Crawford. Caroline Dhavernas was later cast as Dr. Alana Bloom, a former student of Hannibal Lecter, and Hettienne Park was cast as CSI Beverly Katz. Lara Jean Chorostecki, Kacey Rohl, Scott Thompson and Aaron Abrams were cast in recurring roles.

== Reception ==
=== Viewers ===
The episode was watched by 4.36 million viewers, earning a 1.6/5 in the 18-49 rating demographics on the Nielson ratings scale, ranking third on its timeslot and tenth for the night in the 18-49 demographics. This means that 1.6 percent of all households with televisions watched the episode, while 5 percent of all households watching television at that time watched it. With DVR factored in, the episode was watched by 6.77 million viewers with a 2.7 in the 18-49 demographics.

=== Critical reviews ===
The episode received mostly positive response from critics. Eric Goldman of IGN gave the episode an "amazing" 9 out of 10 and wrote, "Hannibal is launching on the heels of both The Following and Bates Motel, giving it a disadvantage in this odd timing of series about serial killers (or, in Bates' case, a serial killer to be). But even if you're already watching one or both of those other shows, Hannibal is well worth your time as well. It quickly has become one of my absolute favorite new shows so far this year (The Americans being the other), and I'm very excited to see what's to come as the story continues."

Emily VanDerWerff of The A.V. Club gave the episode an "A−" and wrote, "Watching Hannibal almost seems an entry-level course in what this show gets right that The Following and Bates Motel get wrong. Where The Following is possessed of glib, nihilistic violence that means nothing beyond pushing the plot forward, Hannibal understands that for every moment of gore, there must be just as much consideration of the effect that gore has on those who must suffer on without the deceased (and those tasked to find the killer). Where Bates Motel seems borderline obsessed at times with painting a portrayal of a budding serial killer and using the audience’s knowledge of what said killer will get up to in the near future, Hannibal makes Hannibal Lecter a supporting player in the show named after him, the ultimate bogeyman in a world that doesn't lack for them. The title doesn't refer to the show's main character; it refers to the show's mission statement: This is a fallen world, a world full of evil. The best we can do is root out the darkness."

Tim Goodman from The Hollywood Reporter gave a positive review for the pilot, writing, "Going well beyond expectations, Hannibal is a series that at one point seemed forgotten in NBC's schedule (it's starting late and ending in the summer) but could end up quickly becoming one of its most important dramas." Maureen Ryan from The Huffington Post wrote, "As it stands, NBC can't afford that kind of one-off success — if the show is successful at all, that is. Strange as it feels to voice the sentiment, I hope this serial-killer drama works for the network. Hannibal isn't a dumb or cynical attempt to mine dark material; the cast, the direction and the adaptation of Thomas Harris’ novels are all quite solid, and if Mikkelsen isn't nominated for an Emmy, that will be a crime right there."

Donal Lynch from The Independent wrote, "Will Graham does justice to his role as a male version of the Jodie Foster character and Mads Mikkelsen is brilliantly icy and creepy as Lecter." Jeff Jensen of Entertainment Weekly gave the show an A− and called it "... finely acted, visually scrumptious, and deliciously subversive." Brian Lowry of Variety said Hannibal is "... the tastiest drama the network has introduced in awhile," and had particular praise for the central trio of Dancy, Mikkelsen and Fishburne. The Chicago Sun Times' TV critic Lori Rackl said, "Hannibal is a haunting, riveting... drama that has the look and feel of a show audiences have become more accustomed to seeing on cable than broadcast," and concluded that "It's also extremely well executed... bound to leave viewers hungry for more." Alan Sepinwall of HitFix called Hannibal "creepy, haunting, smart, utterly gorgeous..." and the best of this season's serial killer shows.

Not all reviews were positive, Mary McNamara from Los Angeles Times wrote, "No, the problem with Hannibal is Hannibal. As written by Bryan Fuller and played by Mads Mikkelsen, Hannibal Lecter, therapist-turned-cannibalistic-serial-killer-turned-crime consultant and possibly one of the greatest characters of 20th century popular literature, is just a big drag." Verne Gay from Newsday gave the pilot a "C+" rating and wrote, "And if Will is such a genius at reconstructing crime scenes, why can't he look into that sinister Lecter soul to see the crime scene going on in there? Everyone else in the audience can. Hannibal just feels like a waste of a big talent - Fuller's."

Vicki Hyman from The Star-Ledger gave the pilot a "C" rating and wrote, "That's a problem with the show: It takes itself so seriously, yet is so far-fetched, from Lounds' gonzo journalism to Graham's intuitive leaps to the cavalcade of Grand Guignol crime scenes to the pretentious dialogue. (When asked what it's like to put himself in the place of a killer, Graham answers: "It's like I'm talking to a shadow suspended on dust.") Ultimately, the artfully staged but repellent murders is what did me in. I just don't have a taste for Hannibal."
