= Sorbet (Hannibal) =

- Hannibal episode
- Episode no.: Season 1 Episode 7
- Directed by: James Foley
- Written by: Jesse Alexander; Bryan Fuller
- Cinematography by: Karim Hussain
- Editing by: Ben Wilkinson
- Production code: 103
- Original air date: May 9, 2013
- Running time: 44 minutes

Guest appearances
- Gillian Anderson as Bedelia Du Maurier (special guest star); Scott Thompson as Jimmy Price; Aaron Abrams as Brian Zeller; Kacey Rohl as Abigail Hobbs; Anna Chlumsky as Miriam Lass; Dan Fogler as Franklyn Froideveaux; Ellen Greene as Mrs. Komeda; Demore Barnes as Tobias Budge; Emily Klassen as Lenora; Michael Park Ingram as Mr. Komeda; Shant Srabian as Dr. Andrew Caldwell; Rob Norman as Police Officer; George Masswohl as Garage Manager; Pierre Simpson as Devon Silvestri; Adam Winlove-Smith as Mr. Murray

Episode chronology
← Previous "Entrée"	Next → "Fromage"
- Hannibal season 1

"Sorbet" is the seventh episode of the first season of the psychological thriller–horror series Hannibal. The episode was written by executive producer Jesse Alexander and series creator Bryan Fuller, and directed by James Foley. It was first broadcast on May 9, 2013, on NBC. Although it was the third episode produced for the season, it was the seventh in scheduled order.

The series is based on characters and elements appearing in Thomas Harris' novels Red Dragon and Hannibal, with focus on the relationship between FBI special investigator Will Graham (Hugh Dancy) and Dr. Hannibal Lecter (Mads Mikkelsen), a forensic psychiatrist destined to become Graham's most cunning enemy. The episode revolves around a murdered man in a bathtub. While BAU insists that the Chesapeake Ripper is involved, Graham has his reservations due to the clumsiness committed during the crime. Meanwhile, Lecter tends a patient obsessed with him while he also meets with his own therapist, Bedelia Du Maurier.

According to Nielsen Media Research, the episode was seen by an estimated 2.62 million household viewers and gained a 1.1/3 ratings share among adults aged 18–49. The episode received positive reviews from critics, who praised the writing, Mikkelsen's and Anderson's performances, character development, and cinematography.

== Plot ==
Lecter (Mads Mikkelsen) attends an opera performance and becomes so moved that he is the first to stand up to applaud. After the performance, he meets with an old friend, Mrs. Komeda (Ellen Greene). One of Lecter's patients, Franklyn Froideveaux (Dan Fogler) interrupts them to present his friend Tobias Budge (Demore Barnes).

Graham (Hugh Dancy) and Crawford (Laurence Fishburne) are called to a motel room to investigate a dead man in a bathtub who had his kidney removed. Using his "ability", Graham deduces that the killer didn't kill him on purpose; he was actually trying to save him after the dead man suffered a heart attack. Due to the mishandling of the situation, he refuses to see the Chesapeake Ripper as the suspect. Meanwhile, Franklyn attends a session with Lecter, explaining that the encounter at the opera was not incidental, as he wants to be friends with him. Lecter makes it clear he is only his therapist and does not want to be his friend. Lecter then visits his own therapist, Dr. Bedelia Du Maurier (Gillian Anderson), attempting to imitate Franklyn's petition to make her his friend, but Bedelia declines that petition.

A few months previously, Lecter becomes upset when he is treated rudely by a doctor during a medical checkup. In the present, the doctor's car breaks down when suddenly Lecter shows up, with the doctor struggling to remember him. BAU finds the doctor's corpse inside a bus, with his kidneys and heart removed. Graham deduces this is the work of the Ripper. Lecter takes another four victims and removes their hearts, kidneys, livers, stomachs, pancreases, lungs, and even a spleen from them. Graham is still affected by the encounter with Hobbs, even imagining himself meeting with Abigail (Kacey Rohl) and making him miss one of Lecter's appointments.

Katz (Hettienne Park) discovers security footage and the BAU finds that the organ harvester is a part-time paramedic, Devon Silvestri (Pierre Simpson), who aspires to be a doctor. They track his ambulance to save the life of one of his victims. Lecter, who accompanies the team, saves the victim while Silvestri is arrested. Lecter reveals to Graham that he worked as a surgeon but retired following a patient's death and settled on therapy as he felt more comfortable. Graham shares his opinion that there is only one Chesapeake Ripper, who was responsible for all of the murders except the first. Using the organs he harvested, Lecter makes a dinner for some of his colleagues.

== Production ==
=== Development ===
In April 2013, it was announced that the seventh episode of the series would be titled "Sorbet", and was directed by James Foley and written by executive producer Jesse Alexander and series creator Bryan Fuller. This was Fuller's 5th writing credit, Alexander's first writing credit and Foley's first directing credit.

=== Casting ===
In October 2012, it was announced that Ellen Greene, having worked with Fuller on Pushing Daisies, would guest star as Mrs. Komeda, "a novelist and member of Boston's cultural elite. She's also a pal of the titular cannibal, Dr. Lecter which should protect her from becoming his lunch."

In December 2012, it was reported that Gillian Anderson would join the series in the recurring role of Bedelia Du Maurier, "the personal therapist of the titular Dr. Lecter." Fuller commented, "Every therapist needs their own head examined and we are ecstatic that Gillian Anderson has chosen Hannibal to mark her return to American television after 10 years to portray Dr. Lecter's personal psychiatrist. Her intelligence and sophistication, not to mention her pedigree of ground-breaking TV, make her the perfect actress to match wits and psychological manipulations with one of the greatest villains of pop culture. I couldn't be more excited." The character was originally described as older, and the producers wanted Angela Lansbury to portray her, as they wanted a "strange mother/son relationship with Hannibal and his therapist." When Lansbury was unavailable, they changed the character's age and background to accommodate her new personality.

== Reception ==
=== Viewers ===
The episode was watched by 2.62 million viewers, earning a 1.1/3 in the 18-49 rating demographics on the Nielson ratings scale. This means that 1.1 percent of all households with televisions watched the episode, while 3 percent of all households watching television at that time watched it. This was a slight increase from the previous episode, which was watched by 2.61 million viewers with a 1.1/3 in the 18-49 demographics. With these ratings, Hannibal ranked third on its timeslot and twelfth for the night in the 18-49 demographics, behind Wipeout, Community, Elementary, Glee, The Office, Person of Interest, American Idol, Grey's Anatomy, Scandal, Two and a Half Men, and The Big Bang Theory.

With DVR factored in, the episode was watched with a 1.9 in the 18-49 demographics.

=== Critical reviews ===
"Sorbet" received positive response from critics. Eric Goldman of IGN gave the episode a "great" 8.4 out of 10 and wrote, "This was a less focused episode of Hannibal than usual. While the search for the Chesapeake Ripper continued, ultimately leading Will and Jack towards someone else entirely, this episode was more observational – following the characters through a lot of different interactions and getting into their headspace in a bigger way."

Molly Eichel of The A.V. Club gave the episode an "A−" and wrote, "For an episode that featured a whole lot of death, 'Sorbet' was full of life. There was a playfulness, almost a deviousness to 'Sorbet' that felt so naturally in place within the context of the episodes, even though most of those lighter tones were caused by brutal mutilation."

Laura Akers of Den of Geek wrote, "I'm really glad that they have this effect on him for two reasons: obviously, learning anything about the interior life of Hannibal Lecter is fascinating in and of itself. But also, this show, thus far, has spent a lot of time on the psychology of its male characters, and used the women purely as plot devices. While this week's episode doesn't change the latter – they are still devices to unlock the secrets of Hannibal – but at least it means we get to see more of them. And with the excellent performances turned in this week by Anderson and Dhavernas, that's good news all round." Kevin Fitzpatrick of ScreenCrush wrote, "'Sorbet' affords Will and Jack some strong character moments in their own right, but the hour truly belongs to Hannibal as we taste but a sample of the elegant horror within. Surely the series won't unravel the Chesapeake Ripper thread too quickly however, likely saving Hannibal's exposure for a later season. It would seem unwise of NBC not to renew Hannibal even with its moderate ratings but hopefully 'Sorbet' proves just a taste of the grander vision to come."
