= Coquilles =

- Hannibal episode
- Episode no.: Season 1 Episode 5
- Directed by: Guillermo Navarro
- Story by: Scott Nimerfro
- Teleplay by: Scott Nimerfro; Bryan Fuller
- Cinematography by: James Hawkinson
- Editing by: Ben Wilkinson
- Production code: 106
- Original air date: April 25, 2013
- Running time: 42 minutes

Guest appearances
- Scott Thompson as Jimmy Price; Aaron Abrams as Brian Zeller; Gina Torres as Phyllis "Bella" Crawford; Seann Gallagher as Elliot Bundish; Cynthia Preston as Emma Bundish; Billy Parrott as Police Officer #1; Craig Thomas as Police Officer #2; Al Vrkljan as Security Guard; Mark Munro as Roger Brunner; Elana McMurtry as Michelle Brunner

Episode chronology
← Previous "Oeuf"	Next → "Entrée"
- Hannibal season 1

"Coquilles" is the fifth episode of the first season of the psychological thriller–horror series Hannibal. The episode was written by supervising producer Scott Nimerfro and series creator Bryan Fuller from a story by Nimerfro, and directed by Guillermo Navarro. It was first broadcast on April 25, 2013, on NBC. Although it was the sixth episode produced for the season, it was the fifth in scheduled order.

The series is based on characters and elements appearing in Thomas Harris' novels Red Dragon and Hannibal, with focus on the relationship between FBI special investigator Will Graham (Hugh Dancy) and Dr. Hannibal Lecter (Mads Mikkelsen), a forensic psychiatrist destined to become Graham's most cunning enemy. The episode revolves around BAU pursuing a serial killer that flays his victims and makes them appear as angels. Meanwhile, Graham starts to feel like he is losing grip of his skill and seeks Lecter's help, who tries to cause a wedge between him and Crawford. Lecter also tends to Crawford's wife, who is hiding a secret from him.

According to Nielsen Media Research, the episode was seen by an estimated 2.40 million household viewers and gained a 1.0/3 ratings share among adults aged 18–49. The episode received mostly positive reviews from critics, who praised Dancy's performance as well as the development for Lecter, Crawford and Bella. Some critics, however, expressed concerns about feeling left out of important material due to the omission of the previous episode's airing.

== Plot ==
Two police officers find Graham (Hugh Dancy) sleepwalking in the middle of the road and drive him back home. The next day, he visits Lecter (Mads Mikkelsen), who deems it a sign of post-traumatic stress disorder due to the gruesome cases he has been working on, with Lecter blaming Crawford (Laurence Fishburne).

In Trenton, New Jersey, Graham and Crawford arrive at a motel room for a new case. A murdered couple has been found, posed in praying positions with the flesh of their backs opened and strung to the ceiling to give them the appearance of wings. Graham uses his skill to try to understand the killer's intentions, while the BAU Team investigates the room, as the killer slept in front of the corpses and then threw up nearby. At the lab, the team discovers several medications often used together to treat cancer, specifically brain tumors. Graham surmises the killer is transforming his victims into guardian angels to watch over him because he is afraid of dying in his sleep. He confides in Lecter that the pressure of looking into killers' minds is starting to break his psyche and Lecter attempts to use this to create a wedge between Graham and Crawford.

Crawford's wife, Bella (Gina Torres), attends a session with Lecter. She explains some of her insecurities, and it is hinted that she is hiding something from Crawford but does not want to talk to Crawford as he is too busy to worry for her. At her house, Crawford tries to get her to talk, feeling that she has been distancing herself from him, but she does not reveal anything. The killer (Seann Gallagher), who constantly sees people's heads engulfed in fire, kills a man and hangs his body, his flesh once again displayed to look like wings. The BAU Team finds that the killer castrated himself, with Graham concluding that he may try to become an angel himself as angels have no genitalia. He then gets into an argument with Crawford, as Lecter's influence is starting to take over him.

Jimmy Price (Scott Thompson) informs Graham and Katz (Hettienne Park) that the murdered couple were wanted criminals. Graham deduces that the killer thinks he's doing God's work even if he doesn't fully know the person he will kill. At another session with Lecter, it is revealed that Bella has terminal lung cancer and, besides not wanting to having him worried, she wants to soften the pain when she dies. Lecter later tends to Graham, whose sleepwalking continues. During the session, Lecter smells Graham, but he notices this and is taken aback by the action.

The BAU identifies Elliot Budish as the killer and question his ex-wife Emma (Cynthia Preston), who confesses that she left him after he was diagnosed with cancer. She also reveals that Elliot suffocated as a child during a fire and was resuscitated by a firefighter, which sparked Elliot's obsession with guardian angels. She directs them to the farm of the incident but they find that Budish has already died by suicide and transformed himself into an angel. The failure to catch the killer heavily impacts Graham, who questions his skills, but Crawford reaffirms he is effective and says he can quit if he wants. The events of the investigation make Crawford realize the reason for his wife's distant behavior and promises to help her through her illness. The next day, Graham visits Crawford's office, stating that he will continue working with him.

== Production ==
=== Development ===
In April 2013, it was announced that the fifth episode of the series would be titled "Coquilles", and was directed by Guillermo Navarro and written by supervising producer Scott Nimerfro and series creator Bryan Fuller from a story by Nimerfro. The episode was originally going to air on May 2, 2013, but following the removal of "Oeuf", the episode aired instead.

The shot where the camera showed the murdered couple was different on its original plan. NBC objected to the scene, citing that they "saw their butt cracks." To compensate, Fuller offered to add more blood to the scene and cover the cracks, which NBC accepted.

== Reception ==
=== Viewers ===
The episode was watched by 2.40 million viewers, earning a 1.0/3 in the 18-49 rating demographics on the Nielson ratings scale. This means that 1 percent of all households with televisions watched the episode, while 3 percent of all households watching television at that time watched it. This is a 32% decrease from the previous aired episode, which was watched by 3.51 million viewers with a 1.4/5 in the 18-49 demographics. With these ratings, Hannibal ranked third on its timeslot and twelfth for the night in the 18-49 demographics, behind Wife Swap, Parks and Recreation, The Office, Glee, Elementary, Person of Interest, Grey's Anatomy, Scandal, Two and a Half Men, American Idol and The Big Bang Theory.

With DVR factored in, the episode was watched by 4.20 million viewers with a 1.9 in the 18-49 demographics.

=== Critical reviews ===
"Coquilles" received mostly positive response from critics. Eric Goldman of IGN gave the episode a "great" 8.8 out of 10 and wrote, "As for 'Coquilles', the episode that actually aired tonight, it was another wonderfully macabre, grisly and fascinating tale. Fuller and his writers are going to some very twisted, creative places with their killers here. The mixture of beautiful and grotesque that was the 'angels' in this episode is certainly an example of that, and once more, I'm somewhat amazed this is airing on network TV. Of course, given how incredibly dark and delightfully disgusting this show is all the time, it also makes it odd that they pulled an episode over content concerns, but that mainly appears to have to do with the inclusion of children in that storyline."

Molly Eichel of The A.V. Club gave the episode an "A−" and wrote, "What really interests me about Jack, though, is his temper. Fishburne has this great, soothing voice that served him so well throughout his career, and it's only highlighted by his occasional freakouts. His voice not only increases in volume, but takes on an anger. In this particular episode, his freakout over Will's insubordination is coupled with his cooing over Bella, trying to figure out why she has been so distant as of late. I am curious to see where this temper comes from, and more importantly where it will be."

Alan Sepinwall of HitFix wrote, "It's a really strong episode for Hugh Dancy, whether Will is arguing with Lecter or Jack. And speaking of Jack, Laurence Fishburne starts getting more to do in this one at both work and home, as we see just how hard Jack is pushing Will, and as we meet Jack's wife Phyllis. Phyllis' story not only offers insight into Jack, but offers a parallel with the Angel Maker, who was driven mad by his own ailment, where Phyllis has simply turned inward for now." Laura Akers of Den of Geek wrote, "Still, all told, a really good episode. The rift and interaction between Crawford and his wife has given him some real depth, which he was beginning to be in need of. Dr. Bloom, likewise, is emerging as something other than a set piece. We were even given a break from Freddie Lounds (who was starting to grate). Now if Dancy can just catch up to the rest of the class and the writers can give the cases the development (not even more screen-time, just a good beginning, middle, and end) they deserve, we could have an unqualified winner." Kevin Fitzpatrick of ScreenCrush wrote, "All in all, it can be hard to gain a sense of how 'Coquilles' progresses the season without having seen the episode intended to precede it, but tonight's episode certainly proved memorable and well-drawn, with the isolation and death specters hanging around as central themes."

IndieWire later ranked the episode as the 14th best TV episode of 2014, writing "The episode, moodily directed by Guillermo Navarro, is a great primer on why Hannibal isn't just one of the best scary shows of the year, but one of the best shows, period. Unsettling, memorable and oddly beautiful in its gothic tones, 'Coquilles' contains all the light and dark of the season at large."
