= Fromage (Hannibal) =

- Hannibal episode
- Episode no.: Season 1 Episode 8
- Directed by: Tim Hunter
- Written by: Jennifer Schuur; Bryan Fuller
- Cinematography by: James Hawkinson
- Editing by: Stephen Philipson
- Production code: 108
- Original air date: May 16, 2013
- Running time: 42 minutes

Guest appearances
- Gillian Anderson as Bedelia Du Maurier (special guest star); Scott Thompson as Jimmy Price; Aaron Abrams as Brian Zeller; Dan Fogler as Franklyn Froideveaux; Demore Barnes as Tobias Budge; Vladimir Cubrt as Garret Jacob Hobbs; Darren Josephs as Officer Stewart; Kevan Kase as Officer Dormau; Zachary Bloch as Pre-Teen Cello Player; Casper Siddall as Douglas Wilson; Daniel Von Diergardt as Dead Man

Episode chronology
← Previous "Sorbet"	Next → "Trou Normand"
- Hannibal season 1

"Fromage" is the eighth episode of the first season of the psychological thriller–horror series Hannibal. The episode was written by producer Jennifer Schuur and series creator Bryan Fuller, and directed by Tim Hunter. It was first broadcast on May 16, 2013, on NBC.

The series is based on characters and elements appearing in Thomas Harris' novels Red Dragon and Hannibal, with focus on the relationship between FBI special investigator Will Graham (Hugh Dancy) and Dr. Hannibal Lecter (Mads Mikkelsen), a forensic psychiatrist destined to become Graham's most cunning enemy. The episode revolves around BAU investigating a murder at a concert hall, where the killer appeared to serenade for another killer. Graham's mind starts deteriorating when he begins hearing animals crying in pain, while Lecter expresses concern for Franklyn, his patient, who is worried that his friend may be a psychopath.

According to Nielsen Media Research, the episode was seen by an estimated 2.46 million household viewers and gained a 1.1/5 ratings share among adults aged 18–49. The episode received extremely positive reviews from critics, who praised Mads Mikkelsen's performance, visual style, the fight scene between Lecter and Tobias and Will Graham's character development.

== Plot ==
Lecter (Mads Mikkelsen) holds a session with Franklyn Froideveaux (Dan Fogler), who worries that his friend, Tobias Budge (Demore Barnes), may be a psychopath. However, Lecter is more concerned by Franklyn's growing obsession with his therapist. He notes that while Franklyn may not be a psychopath, he seems fascinated by the idea of it. He shares his concerns to Bedelia (Gillian Anderson), considering referring Franklyn to another psychiatrist.

BAU is called for a new victim at a concert hall. The victim was a musician named Douglas Wilson, who had his throat opened and a cello neck inserted through his mouth. While using his "ability", Graham (Hugh Dancy) sees that the killer played the instrument inside the victim's corpse while he notes a figure in the empty seats, Garret Jacob Hobbs (Vladimir Cubrt). He confides his discoveries to Lecter, who deduces that the killer may have been serenading another killer. In another session, Franklyn tells Lecter that Tobias told him about planning to kill someone in the same method that Wilson was murdered and wonders why would he tell him, before realizing that Tobias did so he could tell Lecter. Lecter decides to pay a visit to Tobias' shop in Baltimore, claiming to need a catgut.

Graham's mental stability deteriorates further when he begins having auditory hallucinations of animals in pain, even slamming and creating a hole above his chimney when he thinks he hears a raccoon. He has a conversation with Bloom (Caroline Dhavernas) and they both kiss. At first she responds well to Graham kissing her, but then says it would be a bad idea for them to become involved. Lecter dines with Tobias, who confesses to killing Wilson and reveals his intentions to kill both Franklyn and Lecter. He also reveals his knowledge of Lecter as a killer, having seen him dispose of a body. Tobias offers a partnership between both of them, but Lecter is not interested. Graham interrupts the dinner to talk with Lecter about his encounter with Bloom, Tobias having fled out the window before Graham could see him. Lecter uses the opportunity to inform Graham about a possible lead, directing him to Tobias' shop.

Graham and two police officers visit Tobias, but his hallucinations make him leave the shop. When he returns, he finds an officer dead and discovers Tobias' hideout in his basement, where he finds organs and the corpse of the other officer. Tobias surprises him and tries to garrote him, but Graham shoots him in the ear, prompting him to escape. Tobias arrives at Lecter's office, just as he was telling Franklyn he would refer him to another psychiatrist. As Franklyn attempts to calm Tobias and offer his help, Lecter suddenly snaps Franklyn's neck, killing him. Lecter and Tobias then engage in a brutal fight in his office, with both getting stabbed multiple times. Lecter breaks Tobias' arm and then smashes his head with a statue, killing him. As Graham and Crawford (Laurence Fishburne) question him, Lecter states that Tobias came to his office to kill Franklyn and then him to avoid witnesses. In another session with Bedelia, Lecter expresses his intention to open his office for more patients, after stating previously that he might have found a friend in Graham. He assumes responsibility for Franklyn's death, although Bedelia says he can't put his death on himself.

== Production ==
In May 2013, it was announced that the eighth episode of the series would be titled "Fromage", and was directed by Tim Hunter and written by producer Jennifer Schuur and series creator Bryan Fuller. This was Fuller's 6th writing credit, Schuur's second writing credit and Hunter's first directing credit.

According to Bryan Fuller, the characters of Franklyn Froideveaux and Tobias Budge were inspired by Benjamin Raspail and Jame Gumb from The Silence of the Lambs and Gumb was set to play a pivotal role in the episode. As the series was unable to secure the rights for the characters, they created Franklyn and Tobias and the episode went through a different route. He also viewed the episode as an opportunity to explore a possible friendship for Lecter, "we get that Hannibal has been seeking friendship for a while. Therefore, it's not just a new concept to him with Will Graham, but he sees a genuine opportunity for fulfilling that desire with Will Graham."

== Reception ==
=== Viewers ===
The episode was watched by 2.46 million viewers, earning a 1.1/5 in the 18-49 rating demographics on the Nielson ratings scale. This means that 1.1 percent of all households with televisions watched the episode, while 5 percent of all households watching television at that time watched it. This was a 7% decrease from the previous episode, which was watched by 2.62 million viewers with a 1.1/3 in the 18-49 demographics. With these ratings, Hannibal ranked third on its timeslot and ninth for the night in the 18-49 demographics, behind Elementary, a The Office retrospective, The Office, Grey's Anatomy, Scandal, a The Big Bang Theory rerun, American Idol, and The Big Bang Theory.

With DVR factored in, the episode was watched by 4.39 million viewers with a 2.1 in the 18-49 demographics.

=== Critical reviews ===
"Fromage" received extremely positive reviews from critics. Eric Goldman of IGN gave the episode an "amazing" 9.2 out of 10 and wrote, "Though it aired on the same night as many season finales, Hannibal has several more episodes still this season. But wow, this episode certainly felt like a season finale, in terms of going big." Molly Eichel of The A.V. Club gave the episode a "B" and wrote, "'Fromage' is Hannibal's most-action packed episode. It's not a difficult distinction to attain for a series that largely relies on atmospherics and aftermath to illicit the same scares other shows demonstrate through onscreen brutality and tension."

Alan Sepinwall of HitFix wrote, "On the one hand, the fight was almost hilariously over the top. On the other, this is a show that is not shy about absurd (and also horrifying) imagery, and Lecter is portrayed as something of a superhuman in pretty much every version of the story. So if a fellow killer comes at him twirling bow strings as a lethal weapon, why the hell not?" Laura Akers of Den of Geek wrote, "So far, for the most part, Hannibal has been about the why, rather than the what. This week reversed that in a few ways. The most obvious is this week's case: a trombonist is found on the stage of the local symphony with his throat cut, his vocal chords cured into strings, and the neck of a cello shoved down his throat. Evidently, the killer played him, if not to death, then at least in death." Kevin Fitzpatrick of ScreenCrush wrote, "While tonight's episode once again pushes Will a bit to the background in favor of its titular character, 'Fromage' opens up some exciting new colors to the series that ably demonstrate the excitement Hannibal could generate with a second season."
