= Does Someone Have to Go? =

2013 American reality TV series

- Genre: Reality television
- Country of origin: United States
- Original language: English
- No. of seasons: 1
- No. of episodes: 6

Production
- Executive producers: Cris Abrego; Fernando J. Mills; Rabih Gholam
- Running time: 43 minutes

Original release
- Network: Fox
- Release: May 23 – June 27, 2013

Does Someone Have to Go? (originally Someone’s Gotta Go and Toxic Office) is an American reality television series that premiered on May 23, 2013, as a 2012–13 midseason replacement on Fox. It aired on Thursday nights at 9 pm ET/PT.

== Format ==
Unscripted series about a workplace experiment in which employees are given complete control of the company by their bosses, allowing their staff the chance to make changes in the workplace, even if it means firing someone.

== Episodes ==
Season	Episodes	Originally released	
Season	Episodes	First released	Last released
1	6	May 23, 2013	June 27, 2013

No.	Title	Original release date	U.S. viewers (millions)
1	"VMS, Part 1"	May 23, 2013	3.02
2	"VMS, Part 2"	May 30, 2013	2.56
3	"DFX, Part 1"	June 6, 2013	2.68
4	"DFX, Part 2"	June 13, 2013	2.34
5	"THV, Part 1"	June 20, 2013	2.20
6	"THV, Part 2"	June 27, 2013	2.19
