= Freddy Lounds =

- Hannibal Lecter character
- Three on-screen versions of Freddy Lounds (clockwise from top left): Stephen Lang, Philip Seymour Hoffman and Lara Jean Chorostecki.
- Created by: Thomas Harris
- Portrayed by: Stephen Lang (Manhunter); Philip Seymour Hoffman (Red Dragon); Lara Jean Chorostecki (Hannibal)

In-universe information
- Gender: Male (novel, films); Female (TV series)
- Occupation: Tabloid journalist
- Nationality: American

Frederick "Freddy" Lounds (or Fredrica "Freddie" Lounds in the Hannibal television series) is a fictional character in the Hannibal Lecter series, created by author Thomas Harris. Lounds first appears in the 1981 novel Red Dragon as a foil to protagonist Will Graham. Lounds is ultimately murdered by the novel's primary antagonist, serial killer Francis Dolarhyde.

== Analysis ==
=== Literary version ===
Harris describes Lounds as "lumpy and ugly and small", with "buck teeth", and whose "rat eyes had the sheen of spit on asphalt". In terms of personality, Harris further describes Lounds as having "the longing need to be noticed that is often miscalled ego", sharpened by frustrated ambition:

He had worked in straight journalism for ten years when he realized that no one would ever send him to the White House. He saw that his publishers would wear his legs out, use him until it was time for him to become a broken-down old drunk manning a dead-end desk, drifting inevitably toward cirrhosis or a mattress fire. They wanted the information he could get, but they didn't want Freddy. They paid him top scale, which is not very much money if you have to buy women. They patted his back and told him he had a lot of balls and they refused to put his name on a parking place.

Resentful of this treatment, Lounds goes into tabloid journalism, receiving much higher pay for writing popular but factually questionable news stories. Lounds has been characterized by reviewers as a film noir throwback:

Noir tropes appear again concerning the character of Freddy Lounds, a sleazy journalist that's too good for the trashy job he's doing, Lounds is burned by ambition and by desire for vindication in front of those colleagues that look down upon his tabloid-related work. Everything in the character of Lounds, from his disregard for truth masquerading as desire to serve the public, down to his stripper girl-friend, comes straight from the rain-soaked and neon-lighted alleys of a generic 1950s noir downtown, and Freddy Lounds is certainly the most traditional noir character in the novel.

Lounds is also said to represent "the vulgarian who does not believe in anything except his own career; he does not understand the idealistic insanity of Dolarhyde or Lecter or the idealistic sanity of Graham". Lounds' death is reflected as a consequence of his having only "a modicum of understanding" of people with desires unlike his own. As a tabloid photographer, it is also through Lounds that Harris "introduces a theme important to the three novels, the use of film and various optical apparatus to spy upon victims, because the antagonists of the novels need distance". Through photojournalism, Lounds publicly highlights Graham's role in the investigation, thereby making Graham himself a target of the killer, and also conveying to Graham's wife and stepson the dangerous world in which he has involved himself.

=== Film and television adaptations ===
In his review of the 2002 film adaptation of Red Dragon, Roger Ebert of Chicago Sun-Times noted Philip Seymour Hoffman's performance of the character, praising the "humor, of the uneasy he-can't-get-away-with-this variety, in the character of a nosy scandal-sheet reporter".

In the 2013 television series Hannibal, Lounds was recast as "a shifty redheaded female", Fredrica "Freddie" Lounds, and was played by Lara Jean Chorostecki. In this continuity, the character is a tabloid blogger who runs a true crime website called TattleCrime, and who reports on some of the murders investigated by Will Graham. As with the character's appearance in Red Dragon, Lounds sometimes complicates these investigations, and is sometimes used to spread information in order to influence the behavior of the killers Graham is investigating.

Chorostecki noted in interviews that the Lounds of the TV series differed from earlier portrayals in a number of ways. She observed that the change from a male character to a female character provided a great deal of room for interpretation, and found her character to be an equally sleazy journalist, "but in a more sophisticated way". Contrary to the slovenliness of previous portrayals, Chorostecki noted that this version of Lounds was "fresh and central and so high fashion, she always looks her best". Chorostecki has also spoken about the inspiration for the reinvented character, explaining how Hannibal producer Bryan Fuller suggested that Chorostecki study the case of Rebekah Brooks, an editor of News of the World charged with in a widely reported telephone hacking conspiracy.

Paul Doro of Shock Till You Drop, reviewing the TV series adaptation, Hannibal, found the usage of Lounds in that series to be an exception to the show's otherwise high quality, questioning the premise of "a writer for TattleCrime.com, who somehow manages to penetrate crime scenes and gain access to highly secure facilities despite being a notorious tabloid journalist".

== Appearances ==
=== Literature ===
In the novel Red Dragon, Lounds attempts to elicit information from Will Graham as Graham investigates serial killer Francis Dolarhyde, whom Lounds has sensationally publicized as "The Tooth Fairy". Graham despises Lounds, who had sneaked into Graham's hospital room after Graham was attacked by Lecter, and taken pictures of his wounds, publishing them the next day in the Tattler. Lounds becomes aware of secret correspondence between the killer and the now-imprisoned Lecter, and sneaks into a crime scene to get information. He is caught, however, and threatened with imprisonment unless he cooperates with the investigation. Hoping to lure Dolarhyde into a trap, Graham gives Lounds an interview in which he blatantly misrepresents the killer as an impotent homosexual and the product of incest. This infuriates Dolarhyde, who kidnaps Lounds, glues him to an antique wheelchair, shows him slides of his victims, and forces him to recant the published allegations into a tape recorder. Dolarhyde then shows his face to Lounds, bites his lips off and sets him on fire, leaving his maimed body outside the Tattler's offices. Lounds eventually dies in the hospital with his girlfriend Wendy at his side, but not before providing information to aid in the hunt for Dolarhyde. Lecter sends Graham a note congratulating him on Lounds' death, which "implies that the Tooth Fairy's murder of reporter Freddy Lounds is at least a sort of wish-fulfillment for Graham".

=== Film ===
Lounds appeared in the 1986 film Manhunter, which was based on the novel, and was played in that adaptation by Stephen Lang. The character appeared again in the 2002 film Red Dragon, this time portrayed by Philip Seymour Hoffman.

Lounds' mutilation at Dolarhyde's hands is not shown in the film Manhunter, but is "depicted with both more restraint and more ambiguity". In the film, Dolarhyde (portrayed by Tom Noonan) puts something in his mouth that can not clearly be seen and taunts Lounds, before "[c]utting to an exterior night shot of the killer's house... lets Lounds's distant, muffled screams tell the real story". The 2002 film adaptation of Red Dragon, however, retains the original scene from the novel, and shows Dolarhyde (portrayed by Ralph Fiennes) biting Lounds' lips off in close-up.

=== Hannibal television series ===
==== Season 1 ====
In the series, Lounds is introduced in the episode "Amuse-Bouche". In that episode, Lounds snoops around a crime scene to write a story about Will Graham (Hugh Dancy) and "The Minnesota Shrike", the serial killer he is trying to catch. To the chagrin of the FBI, the killer, Garret Jacob Hobbs (Vladimir Cubrt), is able to use these stories to stay a step ahead of the investigation. She is caught engaging in unethical journalism on several occasions, once by Hannibal Lecter (Mads Mikkelsen), when she attempts to secretly tape record a conversation between them. Lounds meets the brother of Cassie Boyle, whom Hobbs impaled on deer antlers, and reveals to him that Hobbs' daughter Abigail (Kacey Rohl), is out of the hospital; she suspects (correctly) that Abigail helped her father kill Boyle. She also distrusts Graham, and writes an article implying that he is able to empathize with psychopaths because he is one himself.

Jack Crawford (Laurence Fishburne) and Dr. Alana Bloom (Caroline Dhavernas) make a deal with Lounds to write a story about Dr. Abel Gideon (Eddie Izzard), a patient at the Baltimore State Hospital for the Criminally Insane who has murdered a nurse. The murder was committed in a manner reminiscent of a serial killer called the Chesapeake Ripper, who hasn't been active in two years, the same number of years Gideon has been incarcerated. Hoping to provoke the real Ripper into making himself visible, Bloom and Crawford have Lounds write that Gideon is believed to be the Chesapeake Ripper.

Lounds attempts to convince Abigail to let her write a book about her father, both for monetary gain and to clear Abigail of involvement in her father's crimes. This is met with grave concern from Graham and Lecter, both of whom have helped Abigail cover up her "accidental murder" of Boyle's brother. In that episode, Lounds also joins Graham and Abigail for a dinner served by Lecter, but whereas the other guests dine on meat, Lounds informs them that she is a vegetarian.

Lounds' involvement in publishing the Gideon story comes around when Gideon escapes from custody and begins murdering the psychiatrists who attempted to treat him. Gideon lures Lounds into a trap by pretending to be one of those psychiatrists who wishes to be interviewed by her. Gideon instead shows Lounds the psychiatrist's dead body, and forces her to write an article about him. He also makes her assist as he surgically removes organs from still-conscious hospital psychiatrist Dr. Frederick Chilton (Raúl Esparza), with the intention of leaving a "gift basket" for the Ripper. When the FBI arrives at the scene, Gideon has fled, and Lounds must keep Chilton alive with a respirator.

==== Season 2 ====
In season 2, Lounds is a witness in Graham's murder trial. She falsely testifies that Abigail Hobbs had told her that she was afraid of Graham, but Graham's attorney elicits the fact that Lounds has been sued for libel six times, and has settled in each case. An anonymous tip brings Lounds back to the observatory she and Chilton were taken to by Gideon, where she finds the body of FBI agent Beverly Katz (Hetienne Park), sectioned vertically and displayed in tableau. When Graham is brought to the crime scene, Lounds photographs him being removed from an FBI van in restraints. Lounds interviews Graham, who agrees to give her exclusive rights to his life story, in order to persuade her to write an article through which Graham can contact the killer of the bailiff and the judge at his trial.

Lounds arrives at Graham's house and investigates his locked barn; inside, she finds the bloodied "animal suit" of serial killer Randall Tier (Mark O'Brien), along with his jawbone, in Graham's meat stores. Graham then appears and, when Lounds flees and calls Crawford, overpowers her. Joining Lecter for dinner, Graham provides the meat, which he calls "long pig"; it is implied to be Lounds' flesh. In the following episode, however, it is revealed that Lounds is still alive, and is conspiring with Graham and Crawford to draw Lecter out. Lecter is able to detect this through Lounds' scent on Graham.

==== Season 3 ====
Lounds first appears in season 3 during the second arc, when Graham is called out of retirement three years after Lecter's arrest to profile a serial killer dubbed "The Tooth Fairy". She sees Graham leaving the institution where Lecter is confined, and later as Graham leaves a crime scene he discovers Lounds on the property. He berates her for taking photos of him while he was in the hospital, and for writing that he and Lecter were co-conspirators. Lounds seeks information from Graham, promising in exchange not to portray him in a bad light in the news; Graham refuses. Later, the killer, Francis Dolarhyde (Richard Armitage), is seen reading Lounds' article, which inspires him to contact Lecter.

Graham and Crawford later call upon Lounds to write a story in which Graham and Chilton describe "The Tooth Fairy" as ugly, impotent and the product of incest, in the hopes of making Dolarhyde angry enough to make a mistake. In this continuity, however, it is Chilton, not Lounds, who is disfigured and burned by Dolarhyde.
