= Lara Jean Chorostecki =

Canadian actress

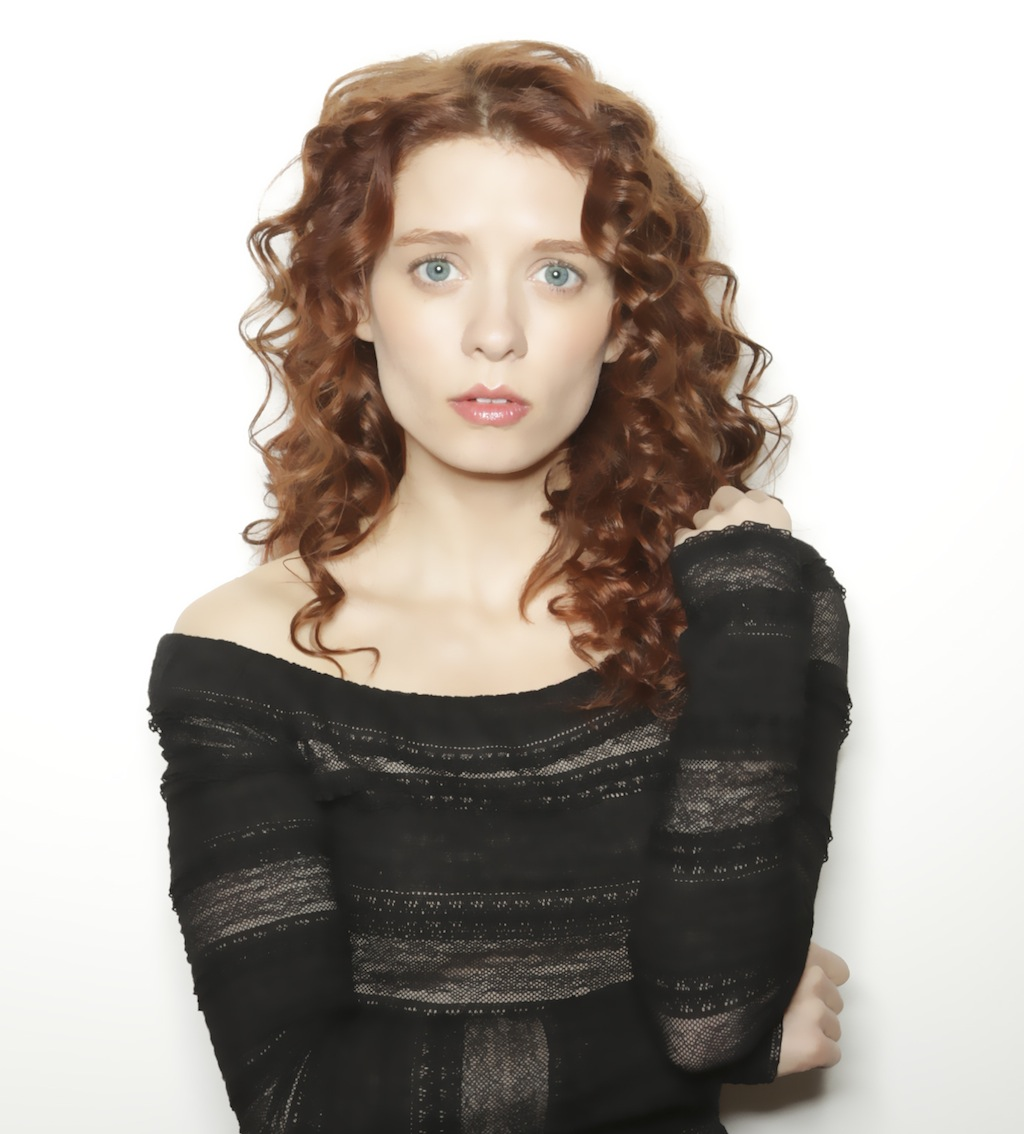
- Lara Jean Chorostecki in 2013
- Born: Lara Jean Chorostecki; 24 September 1984 (age 42); Brampton, Ontario, Canada
- Occupation: Actress
- Years active: 2004–present

Lara Jean Chorostecki (born 24 September 1984) is a Canadian actress. She has played Fredricka "Freddie" Lounds in the American psychological thriller–horror television series Hannibal, and Sergeant Krystina Breeland in the Canadian series X Company.

== Early life ==
Chorostecki was born in Brampton, Ontario, and attended Mayfield Secondary School. Chorostecki's father worked in a bank and her mother was a French teacher. She is of Polish and Scottish descent. She has a brother.

== Career ==
Chorostecki became interested in acting after seeing Les Misérables when she was eight years old. She performed at the Stratford Festival for a number of years. Chorostecki was the youngest ever person to be accepted into the Birmingham Conservatory for Classical Theatre Training in Stratford, Ontario. She earned a Masters in Classical Acting in London, England at The Royal Central School of Speech and Drama.

Early in her career, Chorostecki had series regular roles in the Starz series Camelot and the Canadian comedy Dan for Mayor as well as a recurring role in The Listener and the BBC America series Copper.

In 2013, Chorostecki starred in the Canadian romantic comedy film Please Kill Mr. Know It All. She plays journalist Fredricka "Freddie" Lounds in the NBC drama Hannibal.

In 2014, Chorostecki began filming a series regular role on the CBC World War II drama X Company, where she plays Sergeant Krystina Breeland.

In 2016, Chorostecki was cast in the recurring role of Beth MacLeish on the ABC political drama series Designated Survivor, which premiered in the fall of the same year.

In 2018, she starred in the Canadian drama Nose to Tail, alongside Aaron Abrams.

== Filmography ==
=== Film ===
Year	Title	Role	Notes
2008	Loving Loretta	Trish	Short film
2012	Antiviral	Michelle	
2013	Please Kill Mr. Know It All	Sally	
2015	Renaissance	Kris	
2015	Barn Wedding	Jacquie	
2015	The Masked Saint	Michelle	
2016	Joseph & Mary	Mary	
2018	Nose to Tail	Chloe	
2019	Hammer	Debbie	
2021	Nightmare Alley	Louise Hoately	
2023	The King Tide	Grace	

=== Television films ===
Year	Title	Role	Notes
2007	Roxy Hunter and the Mystery of the Moody Ghost	Young Estelle	
2008	Charlie & Me	Older Casey	
2010	The 19th Wife	Ann Eliza Young	
2019	Crossword Mysteries: Proposing Murder	Christina Blake	Hallmark movie
2019	Christmas 9 to 5	Mia Desmond	Lifetime movie
2021	A Date with Danger	Nikki	Lifetime movie

=== Television series ===
Year	Title	Role	Notes
2004	Doc	Deena	Episode: "Breaking Away"
2006	72 Hours: True Crime	Pam Constable	Episode: "Frenzy"
2007	Degrassi: The Next Generation	Molly	Episode: "Free Fallin': Part 2"
2009	The Listener	Maya	7 episodes
2009	The Border	Kim Norton	Episode: "Dark Ride"
2010	Republic of Doyle	Emma	Episode: "The Return of the Grievous Angel"
2010	Dan for Mayor	Charlie	13 episodes
2011	Camelot	Bridget	7 episodes
2012	Beauty and the Beast	Iris	Episode: "All In"
2012–2013	Copper	Sybil O'Brien	5 episodes
2013	Lost Girl	Ianka	Episode: "Of All the Gin Joints"
2013–2015	Hannibal	Freddie Lounds	13 episodes
2014	Haven	Amy Potter	2 episodes
2015–2017	X Company	Krystina Breeland	24 episodes
2015	We Are Disorderly	Hallie	Episode: "Our Dog"
2016–2017	Designated Survivor	Beth MacLeish	7 episodes
2016	Houdini and Doyle	Clara Reid	Episode: "Necromanteion"
2016	American Gothic	Molly	Episode: "Nighthawks"
2018	Killjoys	Charlie Volford	Episode: "It Takes a Pillage"
2020	The Expanse	Lt. Babbage	3 episodes
2020	Hudson & Rex	Candace Porter	Episode: "Rex in the City"
2022	Reacher	Molly Beth Gordon	2 episodes
2022–2024	Chucky	Sister Ruth	6 episodes (season 2)
2022–2024	Chucky	Charlotte Collins	8 episodes (season 3)
2023	Murdoch Mysteries	Sydney Finch	Episode: "Virtue and Vice"

== Awards and nominations ==
Year	Association	Category	Nominated work	Result
2013	Canadian Comedy Awards	Best Performance by a Female – Film	Please Kill Mr. Know It All	Nominated
2017	Canadian Screen Awards	Best Supporting Actress in a Drama Series or Special	X Company	Nominated
