= Kacey Rohl =

Canadian actress (born 1991)

- Born: August 6, 1991 (age 35); Vancouver, British Columbia, Canada
- Occupation: Actress
- Years active: 2010–present
- Parents: Michael Rohl; JD Derbyshire

Kacey Rohl (born August 6, 1991) is a Canadian actress. She is known for playing Sterling Fitch in the television crime drama The Killing, Prudence in the 2011 dark fantasy film Red Riding Hood, and Abigail Hobbs in the television drama Hannibal. Rohl has starred as Jenna Engel in the 2014 television sitcom Working the Engels, and as Kerry Campbell in the second season of the television sci-fi drama series Wayward Pines. In 2019, she played the lead role of Katie Arneson in the Canadian psychological thriller film White Lie, for which she received a Canadian Screen Award nomination for Best Actress. In 2025, she played a young Rachel Garrett in the Paramount+ film Star Trek: Section 31.

== Early life and education ==
Rohl was born on August 6, 1991 in Vancouver to Michael Rohl, a television director and producer, and JD Derbyshire, a playwright and comedian.

Rohl began studying acting when she was 14. She has said she began performing dramatic recitations as a young child, recalling a memory of reciting a soliloquy from Hamlet at around age four, and later trained in a theatre course at the Royal Academy of Dramatic Art in London.

== Career ==
Rohl's first prominent acting role was playing Sterling Fitch in the first two seasons of the AMC crime drama The Killing in 2011–2012. Also in 2011, she played Prudence in the 2011 dark fantasy film Red Riding Hood. From 2013 to 2015, Rohl recurred as Abigail Hobbs in the NBC television crime drama Hannibal. The role came about through a connection with director David Slade, with whom Rohl had previously shot an unsold pilot; she learned she had been cast while enrolled in her RADA theatre course in London. Around the same time, she filmed a pilot for an unsold ABC/Sony drama, Doubt, in which she played a paralegal. She was cast in the starring role of daughter Jenna Engel in the 2014 NBC sitcom Working the Engels.

Beginning in 2015, Rohl recurred as Marina on the Syfy television series The Magicians. In 2016, she appeared in the thirteenth episode of the fifth season of the ABC television series Once Upon a Time, playing the role of Megara. Rohl was cast in the regular role of Kerry Campbell in the second season of the Fox sci-fi drama television series Wayward Pines which aired mid-2016. From 2017 to 2019, she played the recurring role of Alena on The CW superhero drama series Arrow.

Rohl starred in the 2019 Canadian psychological thriller film White Lie, playing the lead role of Katie Arneson. The film premiered at the Toronto International Film Festival in September 2019, where Rohl was named a TIFF Rising Star. She received a Canadian Screen Award nomination for Best Lead Actress (Film) at the 8th Canadian Screen Awards for her performance, and was also nominated for Best Actor, Female (Canadian) at the Vancouver Film Critics Circle Awards.

She starred as Sabrina Swanson in the 2018 Syfy horror television film Killer High. In July 2019, Rohl was cast in the 2020 Canadian spy thriller series Fortunate Son.

In March 2024, Variety reported that Rohl had been cast as a young version of Lieutenant Rachel Garrett, a character previously played by Tricia O'Neil in the Star Trek: The Next Generation episode "Yesterday's Enterprise", for the Paramount+ film Star Trek: Section 31. The film, centered on Michelle Yeoh's Philippa Georgiou, premiered on Paramount+ in January 2025. Rohl said the role came together over several rounds of auditions, during which she was not initially told which character she was being considered for.

== Filmography ==
Film roles
Year	Title	Role	Notes
2011	Red Riding Hood	Prudence	
2011	Sunflower Hour	Satan Spawn	
2011	Sisters & Brothers	Sarah	
2012	Flicka: Country Pride	Kelly Jenkins	
2016	My Sweet Audrina	Vera	
2019	White Lie	Katie Arneson	
2022	White Dog (Chien blanc)	Jean Seberg	

Television roles
Year	Title	Role	Notes
2010	V	Woman	Episode: "Heretic's Fork"
2010	The Client List	Emma Hollings	Television film
2010	Bond of Silence	Tabitha	Television film
2010	Caprica	Ada	Episode: "Unvanquished"
2010	Fringe	Madeline	Episode: "The Plateau"
2010	Tower Prep	Ross	Episode: "Election"
2011	Ghost Storm	Melissa	Television film
2011	Geek Charming	Caitlin Raven	Television film
2011	Clue	Sarah Ellis	Television miniseries
2011	R. L. Stine's The Haunting Hour: The Series	Adriana / Allie	Episodes: "Wrong Number", "Pumpkinhead"
2011–2012	The Killing	Sterling Fitch	Recurring role, 6 episodes
2012	American Housewife	Harper	Unsold television pilot
2012	Supernatural	Marin	Episode: "The Born-Again Identity"
2012	Taken Back: Finding Haley	Emma/Haley	Television film
2012–2013	R. L. Stine's The Haunting Hour: The Series	Young Nadia	Episode: "The Golem: Part 1", "The Golem: Part 2"
2013	Doubt	Monica	Unsold television pilot
2013	Cracked	Emily Froese	Episode: "Swans"
2013	Played	Beetle	Episode: "Poison"
2013–2015	Hannibal	Abigail Hobbs	Recurring role, 13 episodes
2014	Working the Engels	Jenna Engel	Main role
2016–2020	The Magicians	Marina Andrieski	Recurring role
2016	Once Upon a Time	Megara	Episode: "Labor of Love"
2016	The X-Files	Agnes	Episode: "Founder's Mutation"
2016	iZombie	Cher	Episode: "Eternal Sunshine of the Caffeinated Mind"
2016	Wayward Pines	Kerry Campbell	Main role (season 2)
2017	The Good Doctor	Avery	Episode: "Apple"
2017–2019	Arrow	Alena	Recurring role (seasons 5–7), 12 episodes
2018	Killer High	Sabrina Swanson	Television film
2020	Fortunate Son	Ellen Howard	Main role
2023	The Wedding Veil Inspiration	Lily	Television film
2025	Star Trek: Section 31	Rachel Garrett	Television film
2025	Watson	The Rep	Recurring role
