= Hettienne Park =

American actress and writer

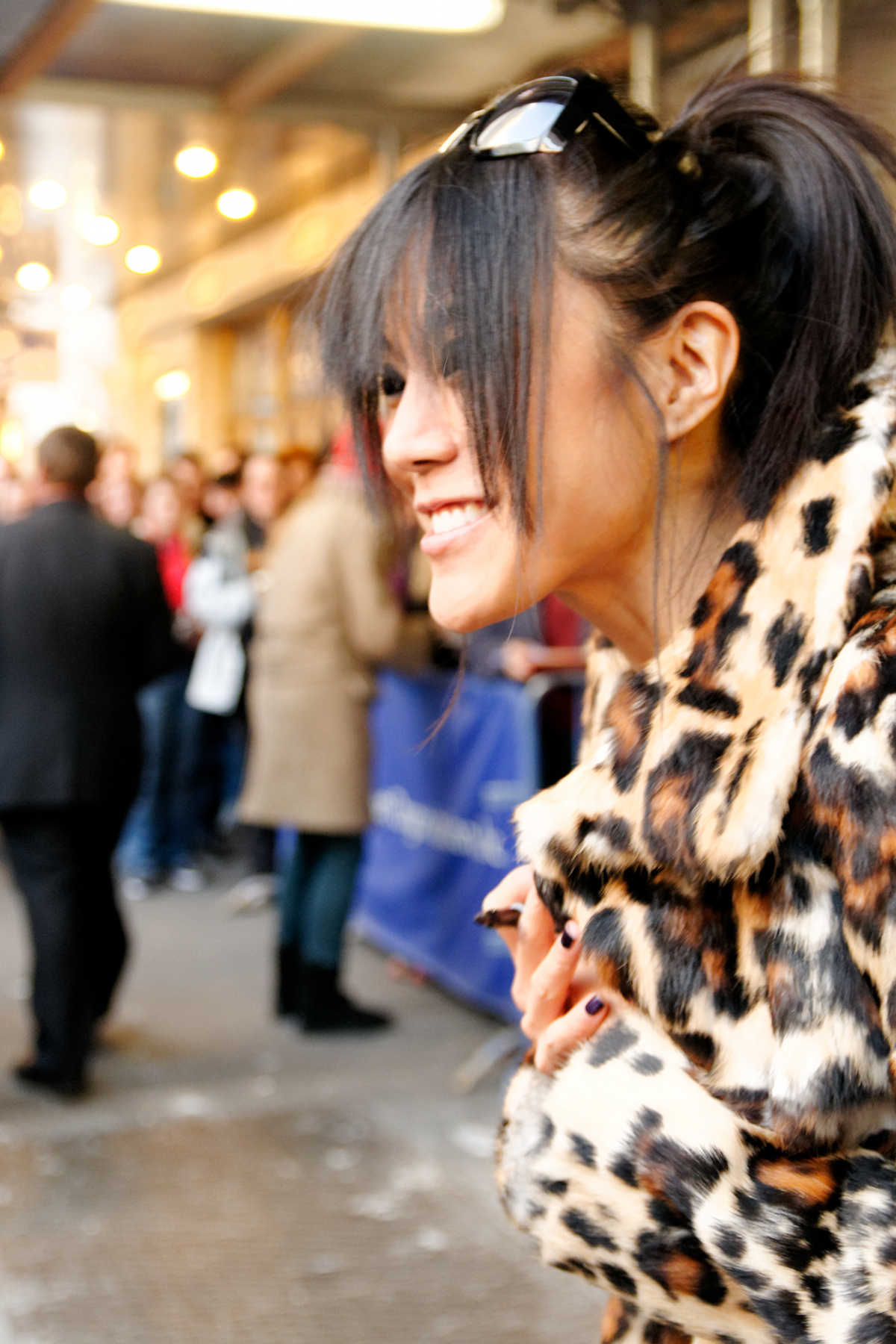
- Park in 2011
- Born: Boston, Massachusetts, U.S.
- Education: University of Rochester (BA); William Esper Studio (GrDip)
- Occupations: Actress, writer
- Years active: 2002–present

Hettienne Park is an American actress and writer, having played roles in Young Adult (2011), Bride Wars (2009), Blindspot (2018), The Outsider (2020), and The Last of Us (2025), with her most notable role being Beverly Katz on the psychological horror television series Hannibal (2013–2015).

== Early life and education ==
Hettienne Park, who is of Korean heritage, was born in Boston and raised in Wayland, Massachusetts.

She received her Bachelor of Arts in religion and economics from the University of Rochester in Rochester, New York. Park studied acting for two years at the William Esper Studio in Manhattan, New York City.

== Career ==
Park's first role as an actress was in a junior high school production of Cats. Her screen debut was in the 2007 movie Year of the Fish. Park was a recipient of the 68th Theatre World Award for Outstanding Broadway and Off-Broadway debuts for Theresa Rebeck's Seminar and The Intelligent Homosexual's Guide to Capitalism and Socialism with a Key to the Scriptures by Tony Kushner.

Park is known for supporting roles in such films as Bride Wars, Young Adult, and Don't Look Up. She starred as Special Agent Beverly Katz, a crime-scene investigator specializing in fiber analysis, in the television series Hannibal, alongside Mads Mikkelsen who plays Hannibal Lecter, and Hugh Dancy. Park starred as Tamika Collins in Stephen King's The Outsider on HBO. In 2025, she guest-starred as Elise Park in the second season of The Last of Us.

== Filmography ==
=== Film ===
| Year | Title | Role |
|---|---|---|
| 2007 | Never Forever | Ming Ming |
| 2007 | Year of the Fish | Hong Ji |
| 2009 | Bride Wars | Marissa |
| 2011 | Young Adult | Vicki |
| 2018 | Private Life | Female Doctor |
| 2021 | Don't Look Up | Dr. Jocelyn Calder |
| 2025 | Sorry, Baby | Eleanor Winston |
| 2026 | Disclosure Day | Serena |

=== Television ===
| Year | Title | Role | Notes |
|---|---|---|---|
| 2002 | Hack | Chloe | Episode: "Bad Choices" |
| 2004 | Law & Order: Special Victims Unit | Annie | Episode: "Weak" |
| 2005 | Law & Order | Taka Furukawa | Episode: "The Sixth Man" |
| 2006 | Numb3rs | Student #1 | Episode: "Backscatter" |
| 2007–2009 | Damages | Female Associate | 2 episodes |
| 2008 | Law & Order | Tina Shen | Episode: "Darkness" |
| 2009 | The Good Wife | Shelly Delgado | Episode: "Home" |
| 2009 | Mercy | Julie Shin | Episode: "I'm Not That Kind of Girl" |
| 2013–2014 | Hannibal | Beverly Katz | 16 episodes |
| 2017 | The Blacklist | Sasha Lau | Episode: "The Harem (No. 102)" |
| 2018 | High Maintenance | Harper | Episode: "Namaste" |
| 2018 | Blindspot | Violet Park | 4 episodes |
| 2019 | The OA | Mrs. Vu | 2 episodes |
| 2020 | Prodigal Son | Leslie | 2 episodes |
| 2020 | The Outsider | Tamika Collins | Miniseries |
| 2020 | 9-1-1: Lone Star | Beth Healy | Episode: "Pilot" |
| 2021 | Gossip Girl | Jodi Menzies | 2 episodes |
| 2024 | The Girls on the Bus | Felicity Walker | Recurring |
| 2025 | The Last of Us | Elise Park | 2 episodes (season 2) |
| 2025 | Black Rabbit | Detective Ellen Seung | Recurring |
| 2025 | The Beast in Me | Agent Erika Breton | 7 episodes |

=== Video games ===
| Year | Title | Role |
|---|---|---|
| 2005 | The Warriors | Additional Civilian |
| 2008 | Grand Theft Auto IV | The Crowd of Liberty City |

== Theatre ==
| Year | Title | Role |
|---|---|---|
| 2004 | The Warrior's Sister | Bulad Khuray |
| 2004 | Twentyone | Jodi |
| 2011 | The Intelligent Homosexual's Guide to Capitalism and Socialism with a Key to the Scriptures | Sooze Moon Marcantonio |
| 2011–2012 | Seminar | Izzy |

== Awards and nominations ==
| Year | Awards | Category | Nominated work | Result | Ref. |
|---|---|---|---|---|---|
| 2012 | Theatre World Award | Outstanding New York City Stage Debut Performance | Seminar and The Intelligent Homosexual's Guide to Capitalism and Socialism with a Key to the Scriptures | Won | |
