= Hannibal season 2 =

Season of television series

Hannibal
- Season 2
- Promotional poster
- Starring: Hugh Dancy; Mads Mikkelsen; Caroline Dhavernas; Hettienne Park; Laurence Fishburne; Scott Thompson; Aaron Abrams
- No. of episodes: 13

Release
- Original network: NBC
- Original release: February 28 – May 23, 2014

Season chronology
- ← Previous; Season 1 Next → Season 3

The second season of the American television series Hannibal premiered on February 28, 2014. The season is produced by Dino de Laurentiis Company, Living Dead Guy Productions, AXN Original Productions, and Gaumont International Television, with Sidonie Dumas, Christophe Riandee, Katie O'Connell, Elisa Roth, David Slade, Chris Brancato, Michael Rymer, Steve Lightfoot, Martha De Laurentiis, and Bryan Fuller serving as executive producers. Fuller serves as the series developer and showrunner, writing or co-writing eleven episodes of the season.

The season was ordered in May 2013. The season stars Hugh Dancy, Mads Mikkelsen, Caroline Dhavernas, Hettienne Park, and Laurence Fishburne, with Scott Thompson and Aaron Abrams receiving "also starring" status. The series is based on characters and elements appearing in Thomas Harris' novels Red Dragon (1981), Hannibal (1999), and Hannibal Rising (2006) and focuses on the relationship between FBI special investigator Will Graham and Dr. Hannibal Lecter, a forensic psychiatrist who is secretly a cannibalistic serial killer. The episodes of the season are named after the different elements of Japanese haute cuisine.

The season premiered on February 28, 2014, on NBC. The season premiere received 3.27 million viewers with a 1.1/4 ratings share in the 18–49 demographics. The season ended on May 23, 2014, with an average of 2.54 million viewers, which was a 12% drop from the previous season. The season received acclaim from critics and audiences, praising the performances, writing, character development, cinematography and faithfulness to its source material. The season finale, "Mizumono", received universal acclaim in particular. In May 2014, NBC renewed the series for a third season.

== Cast and characters ==
=== Main ===
- Hugh Dancy as Will Graham
- Mads Mikkelsen as Dr. Hannibal Lecter
- Caroline Dhavernas as Alana Bloom
- Hettienne Park as Beverly Katz
- Laurence Fishburne as Jack Crawford
- Scott Thompson as Jimmy Price
- Aaron Abrams as Brian Zeller

=== Recurring ===
- Raúl Esparza as Dr. Frederick Chilton
- Lara Jean Chorostecki as Freddie Lounds
- Katharine Isabelle as Margot Verger
- Gillian Anderson as Bedelia Du Maurier
- Cynthia Nixon as Kade Prurnell
- Patrick Garrow as James Gray
- Eddie Izzard as Abel Gideon
- Daniel Kash as Carlo
- Michael Pitt as Mason Verger
- Anna Chlumsky as Miriam Lass
- Jeremy Davies as Peter Bernardone
- Chris Diamantopoulos as Clark Ingram
- Ryan Field as Roland Umber
- Mark O'Brien as Randall Tier
- Kacey Rohl as Abigail Hobbs
- Gina Torres as Phyllis "Bella" Crawford
- Jonathan Tucker as Matthew Brown
- Vladimir Jon Cubrt as Garrett Jacob Hobbs

=== Notable guests ===
- Martin Donovan as Jack Crawford's therapist
- Maria del Mar as Marion Vega
- Shawn Doyle as Leonard Brauer
- Amanda Plummer as Katherine Pimms

== Episodes ==
No. overall	No. in season	Title	Directed by	Written by	Original release date	Prod. code	U.S. viewers (millions)
14	1	"Kaiseki"	Tim Hunter	Bryan Fuller & Steve Lightfoot	February 28, 2014	201	3.27
Jack attacks Hannibal in his home and is stabbed in the neck after a brutal struggle. He barricades himself in the pantry as Hannibal tries to break in. Three months earlier, OIG investigator Kade Prurnell presses Alana to recant her statement about Jack pushing Will deeper into instability, but she refuses. When Hannibal comes to see Will at his request, he promises to prove that Hannibal framed him for the Copycat murders (Note: As depicted in "Savoureux".) and take revenge. Alana, the only one who will listen to his claims about Hannibal, gives him hypnotherapy so he can recall his blackout at Garret Jacob Hobbs's cabin, (Note: As depicted in "Relevés".) and he remembers Hannibal forcing him to swallow Abigail Hobbs's ear. Several bodies overdosed on heroin are found in a river, and Hannibal theorizes via the resin covering them that the killer was using them for some kind of art piece, and they were rejects. Katz goes to Will, who agrees to help her on cases if she investigates the Copycat murders, and he notes that the killer seems to be choosing victims based on skin tone. The killer abducts and doses a black man, Roland Umber. He survives the dose and wakes in a silo, sewn to dozens of bodies that form the shape of an eye from above.
15	2	"Sakizuke"	Tim Hunter	Jeff Vlaming and Bryan Fuller	March 7, 2014	202	2.50
Umber rips himself from the eye and escapes, but falls to his death running from the "Muralist". As Hannibal uses his heightened sense of smell on Umber's body to find the silo, Katz brings photos of the body to Will, who determines that he escaped and was not a reject. The BAU uses this to find the silo, unaware that the Muralist, killed by Hannibal, has been sewn into the eye in Umber's place. Will determines this when given the crime scene photos, noting that the Muralist, a white man, is in the pupil, which is made of black bodies. Shaken by Alana's assessment, Jack agrees to go to mandated therapy. Prurnell urges Will to plead guilty to avoid the death penalty, but he refuses, believing he can prove his innocence. Du Maurier, having cut ties with Hannibal after realizing how dangerous he is, visits Will and whispers "I believe you." Hannibal goes to kill her for separating from him, but finds her house vacated.
16	3	"Hassun"	Peter Medak	Jason Grote and Steve Lightfoot	March 14, 2014	203	2.47
As Will's trial begins, Prurnell pressures Jack to save his career by testifying against him. Jack instead takes responsibility for pushing Will over the edge, which allows him some relief. Freddie Lounds takes the stand and lies about Abigail claiming Will was going to kill her, but his lawyer points out that she has been sued for libel numerous times, discredting her. The lawyer receives a severed ear in the mail, which Zeller and Price determine came from the same knife that cut off Abigail's ear, (Note: As depicted in "Savoureux".) which was checked out of evidence by bailiff Andrew Sykes. He is found mutilated in ways mirroring each Copycat murder, including his missing ear, and Will determines that it is not the Copycat because he was killed quickly instead of tortured. When Hannibal is called as a witness, he tries to claim that the Copycat killed Sykes anyway to get Will exonerated, but is quickly shut down by the prosecution. The judge, Bertrand Davies, is found murdered the next day, getting the case declared a mistrial.
17	4	"Takiawase"	David Semel	Scott Nimerfro & Bryan Fuller	March 21, 2014	204	2.69
After an elderly man is found dead and lobotomized with his skull turned into a beehive, the BAU visits his acupuncturist when another patient of hers, identically mutilated, turns up alive. She admits to lobotomizing both to give them "a dignified end." As Bella Crawford ponders suicide with her cancer growing worse, Hannibal subtly encourages it, and she shows up to a session after taking a lethal dose of morphine and gives him a coin as thanks. He flips it after she passes out, and the result prompts him to resuscitate her against her wishes. Will agrees to Frederick Chilton giving him psychotherapy via strobing flashes of light, which makes him realize that Hannibal was preying on his encephalitis and encouraging blackouts. Chilton goes to Lecter, relating to his "mistake" after accidentally spurring Abel Gideon to murder. (Note: As depicted in "Entrée".) Katz finds that James Gray, the Muralist, had his kidneys removed, and Will realizes that Hannibal likely eats his "trophies." Will tells Katz to go to Jack, but with him looking after Bella, she breaks into Hannibal's house alone and finds something in the basement that horrifies her. He arrives and confronts her, so she draws her gun and several shots are heard.
18	5	"Mukōzuke"	Michael Rymer	Ayanna A. Floyd and Steve Lightfoot & Bryan Fuller	March 28, 2014	205	3.49
Lounds receives a tip to go to the observatory, (Note: As seen in "Entrée" and "Róti".) where she finds Katz's corpse, vertically segmented and displayed. Will is brought to the scene, where he realizes that the Chesapeake Ripper killed both Katz and Gray. Zeller finds that her kidneys were swapped with Gray's. Will demands to speak to Gideon and asks for the Ripper's identity, who counters that he will have to kill the Ripper to prove his identity. Will asks Lounds to write an article about Sykes's murder, which attracts the attention of the killer, Matthew Brown, a Baltimore State Hospital orderly who is obsessed with Will. Will asks him to kill Hannibal, which Gideon overhears and relays to Alana, who alerts Jack. Brown abducts Hannibal at a pool and suspends him from a noose in the building's basement, where he reveals that Will sent him. He gives Hannibal the option to hang himself before he bleeds to death from inflicted wounds. Jack arrives and shoots Brown as he hangs Hannibal, who Jack rescues.
19	6	"Futamono"	Tim Hunter	Story by : Andy Black; Teleplay by : Andy Black and Bryan Fuller & Scott Nimerfro & Steve Lightfoot	April 4, 2014	206	2.18
Will denies sending Brown when confronted by Jack, and points out that the Ripper kills in small groups so their meat doesn't spoil, meaning that during his next wave Hannibal will host a dinner party. Chilton records Gideon mentioning to Will that he was given Alana's address by Hannibal, (Note: As depicted in "Róti".) but he denies saying this when Chilton calls Jack and later baits the hospital guards into beating him. City councilman Sheldon Isley is found dead and grafted into a tree, and Price determines that he was drowned in a local body of water. At Hannibal's next party, Jack takes some food to be tested, while Hannibal has sex with Alana and drugs her so he can abduct Gideon, display the man guarding him on fishhooks, and return to bed so he can use her as an alibi. He later feeds Gideon his own leg. While Hannibal's food has no human meat in it, Price and Zeller determine that the hooks had pieces of Isley, Katz, Davies, Gray, the Copycat victims, and Miriam Lass in them, proving Will's innocence. The rare tree bark used in the lures leads Jack to a farmhouse, where he finds Miriam imprisoned but alive.
20	7	"Yakimono"	Michael Rymer	Steve Lightfoot and Bryan Fuller	April 11, 2014	207	2.25
While Miriam is unable to recall the Ripper's face due to her being given strobe light therapy and is positive that Hannibal is innocent, Will is released and warns Chilton that Hannibal will be coming for him next. At the farmhouse, he determines that Miriam was released so the Ripper could frame someone else, and warns Alana to stay away from Hannibal when he learns of their tryst. At Jack's request, Hannibal gives Miriam hypnotherapy, allowing her to recall being shown the Wound Man diagram. (Note: A reference to "Entrée", where Hannibal killed a man and staged his body similar to the diagram.) Price and Zeller find Hannibal's fingerprints near the farmhouse, while Miriam's blood is found to contain therapeutic medications used by Chilton. Hannibal plants Gideon's corpse in Chilton's home and kills the FBI agents sent to question them, forcing Chilton to flee to Will's, who alerts Jack. Jack catches Chilton and, while he is being questioned by Alana, a watching Miriam suddenly remembers Chilton as the Ripper and shoots him in the head. Despite earlier cornering and almost killing Hannibal, Will decides to resume therapy with him.
21	8	"Su-zakana"	Vincenzo Natali	Scott Nimerfro and Bryan Fuller & Steve Lightfoot	April 18, 2014	208	2.80
Hannibal's new client, Margot Verger, tells him that she wants to kill her abusive brother Mason, which Hannibal encourages. As Will resumes work with the FBI, a woman's corpse is found sewn inside a dead horse's uterus, and she is found to have a live bird sewn into her chest. Soil in her throat leads the BAU to a burial ground of more women, and mentally ill stable hand and suspect Peter Bernardone claims he planted the soil to lead them to the killer, his social worker Clark Ingram. Ingram denies the claim and frames Peter as violent, but an observing Will believes Peter is telling the truth. Ingram is let go and murders another horse to further frame Peter, so Peter sews him, alive, inside the corpse. Will and Hannibal arrive to find him finishing the job, only for Ingram to tear himself out. Will decides to kill Ingram, only for Hannibal to stop his gun's hammer when he pulls the trigger, fascinated by his unpredictability.
22	9	"Shiizakana"	Michael Rymer	Jeff Vlaming and Bryan Fuller	April 25, 2014	209	2.45
Will dreams of decapitating Hannibal using the stag. (Note: Will has frequent visions of the stag in season 1.) He admits in therapy that he regrets not killing Ingram, as he wanted to remember what it was like to kill Hobbs (Note: As depicted in "Apéritif.") and how it might've felt to kill Hannibal, which Hannibal is pleased by. Will encounters Margot, who later come to visit him, and learns that she had already tried to kill Mason before and Hannibal is pushing her to try again. He informs Hannibal of Du Maurier visiting him in the hospital. A series of murders occur with the victims bearing wounds akin to animal maulings. Hannibal connects this to Randall Tier, a former patient of his who suffered from an identity disorder where he wanted to be an animal and uses his job at a museum to assemble a mechanical suit out of fossilized skeletons. Hannibal sends him after Will, who kills him when he breaks into his house and lays his corpse on Hannibal's dining room table, declaring them "even."
23	10	"Naka-choko"	Vincenzo Natali	Story by : Steve Lightfoot and Kai Yu Wu; Teleplay by : Steve Lightfoot	May 2, 2014	210	2.28
During his fight with Tier, Will sees him as both the stag and Hannibal in human and wendigo form. (Note: First seen in "Savoureux".) He and Hannibal combine Tier's remains with a saber-toothed cat display at the museum. Margot explains to Hannibal that her father disowned her after she came out as a lesbian, his will stating that only Mason or a male heir will inherit the fortune of the family meat packing business. Hannibal implies that she could take the fortune from Mason by getting pregnant, and she seduces Will. Hannibal visits Mason, who is training a drift of pigs to eat people alive, and encourages him to seek therapy. When Will denies to a suspicious Lounds that Hannibal is the Ripper, she talks to Alana, believing that Will may be helping Hannibal. She goes to Will's house and finds Tier's suit and remains in his barn. He confronts and kills her as she calls Jack, and her screams are recorded on a voicemail, leaving Jack suspicious after tracing it to near Will's home. Will brings Hannibal Lounds's meat, which they cook and eat together.
24	11	"Kō No Mono"	David Slade	Jeff Vlaming & Andy Black and Bryan Fuller	May 9, 2014	211	1.95
While eating Lounds, Will thinks about emerging from the wounded stag in his own wendigo form. Lounds's body is found burned, and Will makes comments at her funeral that concern Alana. Her body is later exhumed and posed in a Shiva-like manner. Alana goes to Jack, believing Will and Hannibal to have killed Lounds, only for him to reveal that she is alive. As Margot announces her pregnancy to Will and Hannibal, Mason begins therapy, where Hannibal hints at her plan. Will discusses his role as a soon-to-be father with Hannibal, who admits he took on that role for his deceased sister Mischa and that Abigail reminded him of her. Mason's men abduct Margot and perform a hysterectomy on her. When she tells Will of this, he confronts Mason and almost feeds him to his pigs, but instead warns him that they are all being manipulated by Hannibal and he should be killed.
25	12	"Tome-wan"	Michael Rymer	Chris Brancato and Bryan Fuller & Scott Nimerfro	May 16, 2014	212	2.32
Will fantasizes about feeding Hannibal to the pigs. He talks to Jack, revealing that his actions with Hannibal since his release from the hospital have all been a ploy to gain his trust, and Jack warns that his display of Tier's corpse makes it difficult to be labeled as a self-defense killing. Du Maurier is brought in, who recalls how her killing Neal Frank (Note: As referenced in "Relevés".) was akin to murder because of Hannibal's manipulations, and tells Will that he can be caught if he lets his genius get to his head. Mason has Hannibal abducted and asks Will to feed him to the pigs, who instead frees Hannibal and is knocked unconscious. Hannibal takes Mason to Will's house and doses him with powerful psychedelics before convincing him to cut off his own face and feed it to Will's dogs. Will arrives and gives Hannibal the option to choose Mason's fate, so he breaks his neck, leaving him paralyzed. Mason claims he fell into the pig pen and does not know Will when Jack questions him. Will and Hannibal agree that they will soon be caught, and Will suggests that Hannibal confess his true identity to Jack.
26	13	"Mizumono"	David Slade	Steve Lightfoot and Bryan Fuller	May 23, 2014	213	2.35
As Hannibal invites Jack to dinner, he and Will destroy his patient records and plan to flee the country together. Will gives Lounds permission to write about him and Hannibal as long as she publishes nothing about Abigail to honor her memory. Hannibal recognizes Lounds's scent on Will and realizes his betrayal. Prurnell shuts down the sting operation when she learns of Jack covering up Tier's displaying, informing Alana, who has accepted Hannibal's true identity, that he, Jack and Will are to be arrested. She informs Will, who in turn warns Hannibal. When Jack arrives for dinner, he and Hannibal fight. Alana arrives, stopping Hannibal from breaking into the pantry, and tries to kill him, only for him to reveal that he emptied her gun earlier. She flees upstairs and runs into Abigail, who pushes her out the window. Will arrives and Hannibal admits he was saving Abigail as a "surprise," and that the three were to flee together. Hannibal wounds him and Abigail, and Will sees the stag dying next to him as he bleeds out. A post-credits scene shows Hannibal on a French airplane with Du Maurier.

== Production ==
=== Development ===
Around May 2013, trades reported that many services, including Amazon Prime Video, were willing to pick up the series if NBC passed on it, as the network put the renewal announcement on hold until the end of the month. On May 30, 2013, NBC renewed the series for a second season. NBC Entertainment President Jennifer Salke commented, "We're so proud of Bryan's vision for a show that is richly textured, psychologically complex, and very compelling. There are many great stories still to be told." Salke also mentioned that a factor in the renewal was the series' risky content, hoping that it could send a message to content creators as "we support a big, risky event kind of vision like that."

=== Writing ===
Before the series even premiered, Bryan Fuller already had an idea for how the season would go, "season 1 is the bromance, season 2 the horrible breakup." The season was divided into two chapters, with the first chapter belonging to Graham in the Baltimore State Hospital for the Criminally Insane, and the second chapter involving Graham's release and subsequent pursuit of Lecter. Fuller did it as he felt the season's storytelling was "organic".

Fuller said that the season would explore more about Will Graham, "Will knows something no one else knows, and it’s a great place to put a character. One of the things I was most excited about in Season 2 was seeing Will Graham hit rock bottom." He also teased, "a scrappy Will Graham coming out swinging. We get to see what happens when he fights back."

Mads Mikkelsen discussed the possible scenarios for the season, "I see three different scenarios and they're all very interesting. One is that FBI Agent Will Graham knows what I'm doing and I know that he's knowing it. The other one is that he has no idea and he's still in his blurry world I can manipulate. And the third one, which is very interesting, is that he knows but he's not telling me. So he's going to play me now. That would be interesting."

=== Casting ===
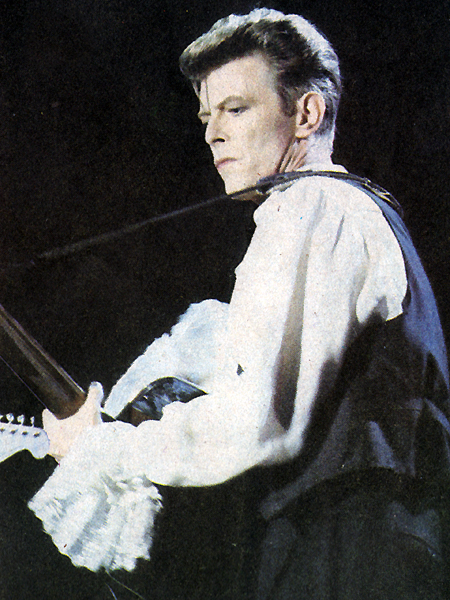
David Bowie (pictured in 1990) was offered the role of Count Robert Lecter but scheduling conflicts prevented his casting.

In June 2013, it was reported that the producers approached David Bowie to play Count Robert Lecter, Hannibal Lecter's uncle, during the season. Despite the character's fate in the novel Hannibal Rising, Fuller stated that they could accommodate the character to appear in the present day scenes. Due to Bowie's schedule, he was unable to take the role but the crew were told by his agents to ask again for availability for the third season.

In September 2013, Cynthia Nixon joined in the recurring role of Kade Prurnell, "an employee of the Office of the Inspector General in FBI Oversight who is investigating the events of the first season and Jack Crawford's culpability." According to Fuller, Prurnell was based on the character Paul Krendler, who debuted in the novel The Silence of the Lambs. As the series didn't have access to characters originating from the novel, Fuller changed the name, with "Kade Prurnell" serving as an anagram for "Paul Krendler".

The season also introduced two characters from the novel, Hannibal, Margot and Mason Verger. In January 2014, Katharine Isabelle and Michael Pitt were announced to play Margot and Mason in recurring roles.

Among guest stars, Martin Donovan appeared in "Sakizuke", playing Jack Crawford's therapist. Amanda Plummer appeared in "Takiawase" as Katherine Pimms, "a hippie-chic acupuncturist who's been causing trouble." Jeremy Davies and Chris Diamantopoulos guest starred in "Su-zakana" and "Shiizakana". Davies played Peter Bernardone, "an animal rescue worker who becomes a suspect when a bizarre murder is discovered at a stable where he once worked"; Diamantopoulos played Clark Ingram, "Peter's longtime social worker who has perhaps been too influential in his client's life".

Jonathan Tucker guest starred as Matthew Brown, an orderly at the Baltimore State Hospital for the Criminally Insane. The original plan was having the character Barney Matthews, who appeared in The Silence of the Lambs. However, the series didn't receive permission to use it, so the producers created a new character based on Barney, making him "younger and perhaps a little more opportunistic." Fuller originally wanted Chi McBride, whom he worked with on Pushing Daisies, to play Barney Matthews.

=== Filming ===
The season started filming in August 2013.

== Release ==
=== Broadcast ===
In December 2013, NBC announced that the season would premiere on February 28, 2014. The season moved to a new timeslot, Fridays at 10:00 pm, after airing its previous seasons on Thursdays at 10:00 pm.

=== Marketing ===
On July 18, 2013, the cast and crew attended the 2013 San Diego Comic-Con to promote the season. In October 2013, Fuller revealed a teaser poster for the season, which highlighted "The Stag Man". He explained, "After a horrifying descent into madness in season 1, this image ironically represents the perspective of a scrappier, clearer-minded Will Graham in season 2. The scales have fallen from his eyes and he finally sees Hannibal Lecter for the monster he is." The first trailer for the season debuted in January 2014.

=== Home media release ===
The season was released on Blu-ray and DVD in region 1 on September 16, 2014.

On June 5, 2020, the season was available for streaming on Netflix. It exited the service on June 4, 2021.

== Reception ==
=== Viewers ===
Viewership and ratings per episode of Hannibal season 2
No.	Title	Air date	Rating/share (18–49)	Viewers (millions)	DVR (18–49)	DVR viewers (millions)	Total (18–49)	Total viewers (millions)
1	"Kaiseki"	February 28, 2014	1.1/4	3.27	0.8	—N/a	1.9	—N/a
2	"Sakizuke"	March 7, 2014	0.8/3	2.50	0.6	—N/a	1.4	—N/a
3	"Hassun"	March 14, 2014	0.9/3	2.47	0.6	—N/a	1.5	—N/a
4	"Takiawase"	March 21, 2014	0.9/3	2.69	0.5	—N/a	1.4	—N/a
5	"Mukōzuke"	March 28, 2014	1.0/3	3.49	0.6	—N/a	1.6	—N/a
6	"Futamono"	April 4, 2014	0.8/3	2.18	0.6	—N/a	1.4	—N/a
7	"Yakimono"	April 11, 2014	0.7/2	2.25	0.6	—N/a	1.3	—N/a
8	"Su-zakana"	April 18, 2014	0.8/3	2.80	0.6	—N/a	1.4	—N/a
9	"Shiizakana"	April 25, 2014	0.9/3	2.45	0.5	—N/a	1.4	—N/a
10	"Naka-choko"	May 2, 2014	0.9/4	2.28	0.5	—N/a	1.4	—N/a
11	"Kō No Mono"	May 9, 2014	0.7/2	1.95	0.5	—N/a	1.2	—N/a
12	"Tome-wan"	May 16, 2014	0.9/3	2.32	0.4	—N/a	1.3	—N/a
13	"Mizumono"	May 23, 2014	0.8/3	2.35	0.5	1.03	1.3	3.38

=== Critical reviews ===
The season received acclaim from critics. On Rotten Tomatoes, the second season scored an approval rating of 98% with an average rating of 9.3/10 based on 45 reviews. The consensus reads: "With powerful imagery and a strong, unpredictable story, season two of Hannibal continues to build on the first season's promise." On Metacritic, the second season scored 88 out of 100 based on 14 reviews, which constitutes "universal acclaim". On April 10, 2014, Hannibal was voted the winner for Hulu's "Best in Show" online competition.

Mark Peters of Slate called Hannibal "an engrossing, psychologically dense show that is also visually stunning... the kind of gem seldom found on network TV." He did however note that the female characters were less developed. Matt Zoller Seitz, writing for New York magazine heaped praise on the show, calling it "serenely unlike anything else on TV or anything that ever has been on TV." Alan Sepinwall of HitFix continued his praise of the series, highlighting the performances of the lead actors. The A.V. Club named it the best TV series of 2014, and wrote that Hannibal was "the best, most elegantly designed thrill ride on TV in 2014".

The season finale, "Mizumono", was met with universal critical acclaim. Gathering a perfect rating of 10 out of 10 on IGN, reviewer Eric Goldman stated, "Hannibal ended its fantastic second season with a thrilling, exciting and audacious series of events" and praised the directing by David Slade. The finale also earned a perfect "A" grade by The A.V. Club, where reviewer Molly Eichel called it "an entirely perfect cap to this season." Den of Geek reviewer Laura Akers labelled the episode "simply divine" and stated that she has "rarely found [herself] looking forward to a show's return more". Emma Dibdin of Digital Spy also heavily praised the episode, specifically Mikkelsen's performance, stating that he is "so convincingly predatory...and so simultaneously scary and sad". She also laid praise on the sound design of the episode by saying that "the integration of a ticking clock worked so well not just in the usual 'time is running out' way, but also a subconscious reminder of Hannibal's manipulation of Will". TV Guide named it the best TV episode of 2014.

==== Critics' top ten lists ====
The season appeared in many "Best of 2014" lists, becoming the ninth most mentioned series in the lists.

2014
- No. 1 The A.V. Club
- No. 1 IGN
- No. 1 TV Guide
- No. 1 Vulture
- No. 2 Complex
- No. 2 Digital Spy
- No. 2 Vox
- No. 2 We Got This Covered
- No. 3 RogerEbert.com
- No. 3 Slant
- No. 3 TV.com
- No. 5 National Post
- No. 6 PopMatters
- No. 7 The Daily Beast
- No. 8 HitFix
- No. 10 Entertainment Weekly

=== Awards and accolades ===
Year	Award	Category	Nominee(s)	Result
2014	Critics' Choice Television Award	Best Drama Actor	Hugh Dancy	Nominated
2014	EWwy Award	Best Drama Series		Won
2014	EWwy Award	Best Guest Actor, Drama	Michael Pitt	Nominated
2014	Online Film & Television Association Awards	Best Actor in a Drama Series	Mads Mikkelsen	Nominated
2015	Satellite Awards	Best Actor – Television Series Drama	Mads Mikkelsen	Nominated
2015	Satellite Awards	Best Television Series – Drama		Nominated
2015	IGN Awards	Best TV Series		Won
2015	IGN Awards	Best TV Horror Series		Won
2015	IGN Awards	Best TV Villain	Mads Mikkelsen	Won
2015	IGN Awards	Best TV Episode	"Mizumono"	Nominated
2015	Saturn Awards	Best Network Television Series		Won
2015	Saturn Awards	Best Actor on Television	Hugh Dancy	Won
2015	Saturn Awards	Best Actor on Television	Mads Mikkelsen	Nominated
2015	Saturn Awards	Best Supporting Actor on Television	Laurence Fishburne	Won
2015	Saturn Awards	Best Supporting Actress on Television	Caroline Dhavernas	Nominated
2015	Saturn Awards	Best Guest Star on Television	Michael Pitt	Nominated
2015	Saturn Awards	Best DVD or Blu-ray TV Series	Season 2	Nominated
2015	Fangoria Chainsaw Awards 2015	Best TV Series		Nominated
2015	Fangoria Chainsaw Awards 2015	Best TV Actor	Hugh Dancy	Nominated
2015	Fangoria Chainsaw Awards 2015	Best TV Actor	Mads Mikkelsen	Nominated
2015	Fangoria Chainsaw Awards 2015	Best TV Supporting Actress	Gillian Anderson	Won
2015	Fangoria Chainsaw Awards 2015	Best TV Makeup/Creature FX	Francois Dagenais	Nominated
