= Tome-wan (Hannibal) =

- Hannibal episode
- Episode no.: Season 2 Episode 12
- Directed by: Michael Rymer
- Written by: Chris Brancato; Bryan Fuller; Scott Nimerfro
- Cinematography by: James Hawkinson
- Editing by: Ben Wilkinson
- Production code: 212
- Original air date: May 16, 2014
- Running time: 44 minutes

Guest appearances
- Michael Pitt as Mason Verger; Katharine Isabelle as Margot Verger; Gillian Anderson as Bedelia Du Maurier (special guest star); Daniel Kash as Carlo; Bas Reitman as Tommaso; Wayne Wells as Matteo

Episode chronology
← Previous "Kō No Mono"	Next → "Mizumono"
- Hannibal season 2

"Tome-wan" is the twelfth episode of the second season of the psychological thriller–horror series Hannibal. It is the 25th overall episode of the series and was written by executive producer Chris Brancato, series creator Bryan Fuller and co-executive producer Scott Nimerfro, and directed by executive producer Michael Rymer. It was first broadcast on May 16, 2014, on NBC.

The series is based on characters and elements appearing in Thomas Harris' novels Red Dragon and Hannibal, with focus on the relationship between FBI special investigator Will Graham (Hugh Dancy) and Dr. Hannibal Lecter (Mads Mikkelsen), a forensic psychiatrist destined to become Graham's most cunning enemy. The episode revolves around Will Graham still building evidence against Lecter, requiring a figure of his past to help him bring him down. Meanwhile, Mason Verger starts to impose his dominance on Lecter, Graham and Margot, and they decide to take action.

According to Nielsen Media Research, the episode was seen by an estimated 2.32 million household viewers and gained a 0.9/3 ratings share among adults aged 18–49. The episode received critical acclaim, with critics praising the writing, sound design, make-up design and the scenes between Lecter and Graham.

== Plot ==
During therapy, Graham (Hugh Dancy) questions Lecter (Mads Mikkelsen) about his treatment and view of Mason Verger (Michael Pitt). He also considers the idea that Lecter may want to kill Mason and then eat him, something that Lecter does not deny, by saying that "whenever feasible, one should always try to eat the rude", and Graham encourages this. He then conducts an exercise where Graham imagines what would happen if they fought, with Graham imagining feeding Lecter to Mason's pigs.

During his session with Mason, Lecter is disgusted by Mason's personality and discourtesy. Mason imposes his menacing nature by hovering a knife at Lecter's throat and then harshly criticizing his artwork, proudly saying that he likes to "play chicken" with Margot (Katharine Isabelle). He decides to tell this to Graham and Margot, who feels humiliated and defeated after Mason arranged surgery that made her infertile. Lecter suggests that, even though she thinks Mason won, she could win by surviving her brother and not killing him. Graham meets with Crawford (Laurence Fishburne), who wants more evidence to take down Lecter. Crawford then shows Graham a possible link that could help them: at the interrogation room is Bedelia Du Maurier (Gillian Anderson).

Graham offers Bedelia an immunity deal for any evidence against Lecter. She confesses that she was previously attacked by a patient, who she then killed. Even though it was deemed self-defense, she considers it a murder, and says that Lecter influenced her to kill her patient. She warns Graham that Lecter will motivate him to kill someone for him through persuasion. He shares a degree of acknowledgment during therapy with Lecter, while Bedelia warns Crawford that Lecter will be one step ahead of them. Graham is visited by Mason, who asks him to accompany him to the farm. Meanwhile, Verger's henchmen kidnap Lecter, although Lecter manages to kill one of them before passing out.

At his farm, Mason puts Lecter in a straitjacket and hangs him over the pigs, just like Graham's fantasy. He gives Graham a knife and orders him to stab Lecter so he can start feeding the pigs. Instead, Graham cuts Lecter's straitjacket, and is knocked unconscious by Carlo. When he wakes up, he finds trails of blood, Lecter and Mason gone, and Carlo's corpse being devoured by the pigs. Lecter takes Mason to Graham's house, where he forces him to consume several psychedelic drugs, causing him to laugh hysterically and lose grip of reality. Lecter hands him a knife and asks Mason to demonstrate how his father used to slaughter pigs.

Graham returns to his house, finding some of his dogs outside. He enters and discovers Mason laughing as he removes the skin of his face and feeds them to his dogs. Lecter appears, wondering what should be done with him as he orders Mason to cut his own nose and eat it too. Graham leaves the solution to Lecter, who decides to kill Mason by snapping his neck. Later, Crawford visits an alive Mason, who is now paralyzed and bed-ridden, at his estate. Mason does not reveal Lecter's involvement, instead saying that he fell into the pig pen. After he leaves, Margot states that she will care for Mason just as he cared for her. Lecter and Graham have a conversation regarding their lies and how eventually their activities will be revealed and both will go to prison. Graham suggests that Lecter must confess to Crawford. Lecter, who has begun to consider Crawford a friend, decides it may be for the best.

== Production ==
=== Development ===
In February 2014, Bryan Fuller announced that the twelfth episode of the season would be titled "Tome-wan". NBC would confirm the title in April 2014, with executive producer Chris Brancato, Fuller, and co-executive producer Scott Nimerfro writing the episode and executive producer Michael Rymer directing. This was Fuller's 20th writing credit, Brancato's fourth writing credit, Nimerfro's 7th writing credit, and Rymer's 7th directing credit.

=== Casting ===
This was the last episode to feature Michael Pitt as Mason Verger. Pitt chose not to return for the third season, and his role was recast, with Joe Anderson playing Verger starting with "Aperitivo".

== Reception ==
=== Viewers ===
The episode was watched by 2.32 million viewers, earning a 0.9/3 in the 18-49 rating demographics on the Nielson ratings scale. This means that 0.9 percent of all households with televisions watched the episode, while 3 percent of all households watching television at that time watched it. This was a 18% increase from the previous episode, which was watched by 1.95 million viewers with a 0.7/2 in the 18-49 demographics. With these ratings, Hannibal ranked second on its timeslot and sixth for the night in the 18-49 demographics, behind Kitchen Nightmares, Grimm, Dateline NBC, Barbara Waters: Her Story, and Shark Tank.

With DVR factored, the episode was watched with a 1.3 on the 18-49 demo.

=== Critical reviews ===
"Tome-wan" received critical acclaim. Eric Goldman of IGN gave the episode an "amazing" 9.3 out of 10 and wrote in his verdict: "This felt like an especially verbose episode of Hannibal, with a lot of lines like 'We've been maintaining our position on the event horizon of chaos' that could easily completely take you out of the show, were it not for the utter commitment of all involved to make it feel like part of this very specific world. There really is no show quite like Hannibal, with its specific mixture of stylized dialogue, beautifully atmospheric cinematography and oh-so gory and macabre set pieces. The showdown between Hannibal and Mason was fascinating as these two very different yet equally twisted men led to Mason becoming a very changed man on the outside – who now has nothing but immobile time to plan how he might strike back. Let's continue to be thankful that after next week's season finale, we know for certain more of this show is coming next year, shall we?"

Molly Eichel of The A.V. Club gave the episode an "A−" and wrote, "'Tome-wan' was an off-putting episode, and not just because we watched Mason Verger eat his own nose (tastes likes chicken!). Let's be clear here: Mason's final act of terror for the season was one of the more gruesome images the show has offered up, minus the beauty associated with the macabre that other images of horror have given us so far."

Alan Sepinwall of HitFix wrote, "One episode to go, and it's a relief to know the show will be back for at least one more season, especially since I can't imagine we close this season with Hannibal behind the same bars that held Will a year ago at this time. (A season devoted to Lecter as a fugitive, and maybe his trial, seems to make more sense.)" Mark Rozeman of Paste gave the episode a 9.4 out of 10 and wrote, "As the season's penultimate episode, 'Tome-Wan' delivers all the grotesque thrills that the show's creative team does best. It's cerebral without ever being boring, and deliciously violent without ever quite feeling exploitative. As the clock counts down to the long-awaited Jack-Hannibal duel in the season finale, it's impressive to look back and see how the writers have so deftly laid down an unorthodox, yet somehow believable story trail from the beginning of the season to the end. Fingers crossed they stick this landing."

Gerri Mahn of Den of Geek gave the episode a 4.5 star rating out of 5 and wrote, "Last week Graham suggested to Mason Verger that he feed Hannibal to his pigs. Oh the best laid plans of mice and men. How often they go awry. Well, only if you are a buffoon like Mason. As we might have guessed, the meal he planned for his piggly wigglies does not work out as intended." Nick McHatton of TV Fanatic gave the episode a 4.5 star rating out of 5 and wrote, "Will's been cunning and smart in his playing with Hannibal, but there's a reason why Hannibal has been so successful for all of this time: he's incredibly intelligent and he's incredibly dangerous. Hannibal could still very well be the one to pull ahead at any more if he has not done so already. Which is entirely the point of an eternal chase."
