= Mukōzuke (Hannibal) =

- Hannibal episode
- Episode no.: Season 2 Episode 5
- Directed by: Michael Rymer
- Written by: Ayanna A. Floyd; Steve Lightfoot; Bryan Fuller
- Cinematography by: James Hawkinson
- Editing by: Michael Doherty
- Production code: 205
- Original air date: March 28, 2014
- Running time: 42 minutes

Guest appearances
- Eddie Izzard as Dr. Abel Gideon (special guest star); Raúl Esparza as Dr. Frederick Chilton; Lara Jean Chorostecki as Freddie Lounds; Jonathan Tucker as Matthew Brown

Episode chronology
← Previous "Takiawase"	Next → "Futamono"
- Hannibal season 2

"Mukōzuke" is the fifth episode of the second season of the psychological thriller–horror series Hannibal. It is the 18th overall episode of the series and was written by Ayanna A. Floyd, executive producer Steve Lightfoot and series creator Bryan Fuller, and directed by executive producer Michael Rymer. It was first broadcast on March 28, 2014, on NBC.

The series is based on characters and elements appearing in Thomas Harris' novels Red Dragon and Hannibal, with focus on the relationship between FBI special investigator Will Graham (Hugh Dancy) and Dr. Hannibal Lecter (Mads Mikkelsen), a forensic psychiatrist destined to become Graham's most cunning enemy. The episode revolves around an investigation on Beverly Katz's murder, with Will Graham participating in the investigation. Knowing that Lecter might be involved, Graham contacts someone to carry an important mission for him.

According to Nielsen Media Research, the episode was seen by an estimated 3.49 million household viewers and gained a 1.0/3 ratings share among adults aged 18–49. The episode received universal acclaim from critics, who highlighted Will Graham's actions, performances and momentum as standouts.

== Plot ==
At his house, Lecter (Mads Mikkelsen) prepares breakfast for Crawford (Laurence Fishburne), who has stayed up all night at the hospital following his wife's suicide attempt. Following an anonymous tip, Lounds (Lara Jean Chorostecki) visits the observatory where Abel Gideon was captured and where the Chesapeake ripper left Miriam Lass' arm. She discovers something that horrifies her and contacts the FBI. Crawford arrives at the scene to find Beverly Katz (Hettienne Park) dead, sectioned vertically and displayed in tableau. Crawford breaks down and informs the rest of the BAU as well as Graham (Hugh Dancy), who wants to see the crime scene. Graham is transported there while strapped to an upright gurney and donning a bite-guard mask by the medical staff. Using his "ability", Graham deduces that the killer was caught by Katz and he strangled her, then proceeded to freeze her in order to conserve her in a clean state before slicing her with a bandsaw. He shares his theory with Crawford, saying that she investigated both the Chesapeake Ripper and his copycat, and presses his theory that Hannibal is responsible.

After an autopsy, a grief-stricken Price (Scott Thompson) and Zeller (Aaron Abrams) inform Crawford that Katz's kidneys were removed and replaced with that of the mural killer. It is shown that Lecter used Katz's kidneys for a meal. Wanting to know more about the Ripper, Graham convinces Chilton (Raúl Esparza) to transfer Gideon (Eddie Izzard) for interrogation. Gideon is not cooperative with Graham, refusing to reveal anything about the Ripper. When he says he will have to kill the Ripper if he really wants him, Graham is intrigued by the idea.

Lounds visits Graham, who offers a deal to let her publish a story on him in exchange for writing on her tabloid in hopes of luring the man who killed the judge. That night, the killer reveals himself to be an orderly at the hospital who has been attending Graham, Matthew Brown (Jonathan Tucker). Brown confesses to killing the bailiff but claims he wasn't responsible for the judge's death. He is fascinated by Graham and wants his admiration, so Graham asks him to kill Lecter. Brown leaves in order to do it, unaware that Gideon has overheared their conversation. Later, Bloom (Caroline Dhavernas) visits Graham to question him about the interview with Lounds and realizes he did something, but Graham refuses to reveal it. She then conducts a session with Gideon, who offers her a chance to save Graham from himself by revealing his intended plans for Lecter.

Bloom and Crawford attempt to warn Lecter, who is swimming laps on a private club pool. There, Brown shoots him with a tranquilizer gun. Brown then has Lecter standing on a balancing bucket, slits his wrists and strings him up with a noose while he is bleeding. He then asks him certain questions and no matter if Lecter answers or not, Brown will know due a psychological response (if his pupils dilate, it means yes and if it doesn't, it means no). He finds that Lecter is the Chesapeake Ripper and gloats over how he will be viewed for killing him. Just then, Crawford arrives at the scene, having tracked Lecter's phone. Lecter warns that he has a gun, prompting Crawford to shoot Brown. However, Brown kicks Lecter's bucket out from under him with his dying breath. Crawford saves Lecter while Bloom calls an ambulance. At the hospital, Graham has a fantasy where blood starts appearing on his sink.

== Production ==
=== Development ===
In March 2014, it was announced that the fifth episode of the season would be titled "Mukōzuke" and that it would be written by Ayanna A. Floyd, executive producer Steve Lightfoot and series creator Bryan Fuller with executive producer Michael Rymer directing. This was Floyd's first writing credit, Lightfoot's 6th writing credit, Fuller's 14th writing credit, and Rymer's fourth directing credit.

=== Writing ===
The episode marked Hettienne Park's final appearance as Beverly Katz, as her character was killed off. Fuller said that the original plan was having the character die in "Savoureux", with her ear being the one that Will Graham throws up at his house. Plans changed, as Fuller felt the audience did not know Katz enough. He said, "It felt like, let's have her be the ally that Will earns, and she starts to believe, and then we know it's episode four and she's starting to believe, so she's not long for this world." Park said that Fuller and executive David Slade told her about her character's fate even before the series started filming. She said that despite her character not dying in "Savoureux", "I knew eventually, sooner or later, Beverly was gonna be the first one from the team to get killed."

Jonathan Tucker prepared for his role after consulting it with Fuller, who accepted all his suggestions. He said, "You've got to take risks, and you've got to create characters. You have to build on what's on the paper. You've got to try and interpret this subconsciousness of the writers. We have to be big."

== Reception ==
=== Viewers ===
The episode was watched by 3.49 million viewers, earning a 1.0/3 in the 18-49 rating demographics on the Nielson ratings scale. This means that 1 percent of all households with televisions watched the episode, while 3 percent of all households watching television at that time watched it. This was a 29% increase from the previous episode, which was watched by 2.69 million viewers with a 0.9/3 in the 18-49 demographics. With these ratings, Hannibal ranked third on its timeslot and seventh for the night in the 18-49 demographics, behind The Neighbors, a Shark Tank rerun, Last Man Standing, 20/20, Dateline NBC, and a 2014 NCAA Division I men's basketball tournament game.

With DVR factored, the episode was watched with a 1.6 on the 18-49 demo.

=== Critical reviews ===
"Mukōzuke" received universal acclaim from critics. Eric Goldman of IGN gave the episode an "amazing" 9.5 out of 10 and wrote in his verdict: "Hannibal remains a fascinating character, that's for sure. Even as he grows more repellent, we can see how when he says something like 'Life is precious,' he means it - making it even worse that he oh-so enjoys taking lives. After last week's thrilling episode, this week showed the inevitable, grim and shocking aftermath as Beverly proved just what happens when you get too close to the truth about Dr. Lecter and your name isn't Will Graham." Molly Eichel of The A.V. Club gave the episode an "A" and wrote, "For a series that is masterfully visual, that scene fade was one of the series' more stellar moments. And, for a series that has been consistently great throughout its short run, 'Mukozuke' was a standout in excellence. But, you guys, I'm still a little sad about Beverly."

Alan Sepinwall of HitFix wrote, "So intense, so beautiful to look at, so eerie to listen to, like always. I have access to several episodes past this one, but I'm trying to stick to one episode at a time, both because I don't want my reviews to be too influenced by what I know what's coming, and because this is a show worth savoring, and building up a hunger for over the course of each week." Mark Rozeman of Paste gave the episode a 9.8 out of 10 and wrote, "With this hour, Hannibal looks to be on a major roll right now, airing two of its best episodes back-to-back in what amounts to the second one-two punch of the season. Unless the writers totally screw the pooch going forward, which I highly doubt at this point, it looks like we're in for one hell of a roller coaster ride." Gerri Mahn of Den of Geek gave the episode a perfect 5 star rating out of 5 and wrote, "I am curious what Hannibal's long game is going to be this time around. Does he ultimately regret getting Graham incarcerated? Was the death of the judge his way of apologizing? How will this attempt on his life effect his feelings for the wackadoodle? What is going on behind that inscrutable face? And what about Graham? Is the obvious overplaying of his hand just a lure to draw the doctor out? If the series stays true to form, we won't know what hit us until the very end."
