= Takiawase (Hannibal) =

- Hannibal episode
- Episode no.: Season 2 Episode 4
- Directed by: David Semel
- Written by: Scott Nimerfro; Bryan Fuller
- Cinematography by: James Hawkinson
- Editing by: Stephen Philipson
- Production code: 204
- Original air date: March 21, 2014
- Running time: 43 minutes

Guest appearances
- Eddie Izzard as Dr. Abel Gideon; Gina Torres as Phyllis "Bella" Crawford; Kacey Rohl as Abigail Hobbs; Raúl Esparza as Dr. Frederick Chilton; Amanda Plummer as Katherine Pims; Steven John Whistance-Smith as Lloyd Roast; Peyton Kennedy as Little Girl; Patrick Garrow as Killer

Episode chronology
← Previous "Hassun"	Next → "Mukōzuke"
- Hannibal season 2

"Takiawase" is the fourth episode of the second season of the psychological thriller–horror series Hannibal. It is the 17th overall episode of the series and was written by co-executive producer Scott Nimerfro and series creator Bryan Fuller, and directed by David Semel. It was first broadcast on March 21, 2014, on NBC.

The series is based on characters and elements appearing in Thomas Harris' novels Red Dragon and Hannibal, with focus on the relationship between FBI special investigator Will Graham (Hugh Dancy) and Dr. Hannibal Lecter (Mads Mikkelsen), a forensic psychiatrist destined to become Graham's most cunning enemy. The episode revolves around an acupuncturist who lobotomizes her patients, leaving their corpses on meadows to be consumed by bees. As BAU investigates, Graham informs Katz about recent discoveries about Lecter while Lecter attends Bella, whose cancer seems to be worsening.

According to Nielsen Media Research, the episode was seen by an estimated 2.69 million household viewers and gained a 0.9/3 ratings share among adults aged 18–49. The episode received universal acclaim from critics, who praised the performances, Plummer's guest appearance, writing, directing, score and ending.

== Plot ==
After dreaming of Abigail (Kacey Rohl), Graham (Hugh Dancy) is visited by Katz (Hettienne Park), who informs him about their progress in the "human mural" case. Graham is still certain that Lecter (Mads Mikkelsen) was involved, even when Katz remains dubious. Graham accepts to submit to therapy with Chilton (Raúl Esparza), asking him not to tell Lecter. Chilton doses him with a truth serum, which causes Graham to remember that Lecter was triggering the symptoms of his encephalitis through psychic driving and light triggers to induce Graham's seizures, memory gaps and hallucinations. Chilton asks Lecter about Graham's claims, viewing him as a psychiatrist who motivated a patient to commit murder, and prevents him from meeting Graham. Meanwhile, Lecter attends to Bella (Gina Torres), whose cancer continues developing. She considers suicide and Lecter even encourages her to do it, considering that death is not a defeat, but a cure.

During this, the BAU discovers a corpse in a meadow which has been converted into a beehive, with evidence pointing to the victim having been lobotomized. As they investigate, an acupuncturist (Amanda Plummer) paralyzes a patient with bee venom and starts performing a surgery on his eyes. The patient is later found in a park, with his eyes missing but still alive. Katz finds a connection between the victims due to the use of stitches. Graham experiences more memories, this time witnessing the events of the night he took Abel Gideon to Lecter's house. He sees Lecter talk with Gideon (Eddie Izzard), where Gideon deduced that he was the Chesapeake Ripper and Graham finally realizes that Lecter is a cannibal. Graham shares this information with Katz, warning her to stay away from Lecter, but she is still hesitant in his claims.

The BAU questions the acupuncturist, Katherine Pimms, as the victims were all patients of hers. She admits to performing the surgeries on suffering patients and letting them have peaceful deaths in the meadows. She allows herself to be taken into custody. Bella once again visits Lecter, where she states she followed his advice and has consumed an immense amount of morphine, intending to die at Lecter's office to avoid complications at home. She asks him to tell Crawford that she loves him and says farewell to Lecter as the effects of the morphine start taking place and falls unconscious. Lecter flips a coin that she gave him and then injects her with Naloxone, saving her life.

Bella wakes up in the hospital with Crawford (Laurence Fishburne) and Lecter. Lecter leaves the coin and apologizes to Bella for not "honoring" what she asked him. She slaps him and tells him to leave, which he does without hesitating. Katz, having found out that the mural killer was stitched with the same material from which the Ripper removed kidneys, sneaks into Lecter's house at night for evidence without telling anyone. She finds kidney packages in his freezer and enters his basement. There, she turns on the lights and is shocked by what she sees. However, Katz sees Lecter staring behind her. She draws her gun as he runs towards her, and the episode ends with a shot at Lecter's house as gunshots are heard and a body is heard hitting the floor.

== Production ==
=== Development ===
In February 2014, it was announced that the fourth episode of the season would be titled "Takiawase" and that it would be written by co-executive producer Scott Nimerfro and series creator Bryan Fuller with David Semel directing. This was Nimerfro's fourth writing credit, Fuller's 13th writing credit, and Semel's first directing credit.

=== Writing ===
Hettienne Park said that during the filming of the sequence where her character sneaked into Lecter's house, she questioned her character's actions but she eventually accepted them, saying "We love being that invested and being on the edge of our seats. We can't have everything be so logical, because then it would be boring. You want reality, turn on the news!"

=== Casting ===
In October 2013, it was reported that Amanda Plummer would guest star as Katherine Pimms, "a hippie-chic acupuncturist who's been causing trouble."

== Reception ==
=== Viewers ===
The episode was watched by 2.69 million viewers, earning a 0.9/3 in the 18-49 rating demographics on the Nielson ratings scale. This means that 0.9 percent of all households with televisions watched the episode, while 3 percent of all households watching television at that time watched it. This was a 8% increase from the previous episode, which was watched by 2.47 million viewers with a 0.9/3 in the 18-49 demographics. With these ratings, Hannibal ranked third on its timeslot and seventh for the night in the 18-49 demographics, behind a Last Man Standing rerun, Dateline NBC, a 2014 NCAA Division I men's basketball tournament game, Grimm, 20/20, and Shark Tank.

With DVR factored, the episode was watched with a 1.4 on the 18-49 demo.

=== Critical reviews ===
"Takiawase" received universal acclaim from critics. Eric Goldman of IGN gave the episode an "amazing" 9.3 out of 10 and wrote in his verdict:

Hannibal continues to excel in nearly every way. This episode offered poignancy via Bella's situation and the specter of Abigail; audacious, twisted horror imagery via the bee man; and effective use of a guest star with Amanda Plummer. Beverly should have played things more safe, but seeing her getting to the truth, while Will himself is also realizing more than ever, is adding to the increasing suspense for this phenomenal series. Run Beverly, run!!!!

Molly Eichel of The A.V. Club gave the episode an "A" and wrote, "'Takiawase' was Hannibal's first truly perfect episode the season, impressive at only a third of the way through the season. It was structurally complicated, with its episodic case pushing the main theme of the episode, while still bolstering Will's proclamations of innocence." Alan Sepinwall of HitFix wrote, "After last week's mostly unsuccessful attempt at dressing up in courtroom drama clothes, Hannibal gets back to what it does best with 'Takiawase', an episode full of freaky imagery, gripping mind games and overwhelming emotion." Mark Rozeman of Paste gave the episode a 9.8 out of 10 and wrote, "The challenge with recapping a show as great as Hannibal is that there's simply far too much to talk about, and the tendency to rant and rave becomes infinitely more likely, especially when you have an hour as phenomenal as 'Takiawase'. Even before the show's second year had begun, Bryan Fuller had hinted that the fourth episode would be where a major shift would happen. He was not lying."

Marc Buxton of Den of Geek gave the episode a perfect 5 star rating out of 5 and wrote, "Seriously, Hannibal probably should air a bit earlier. Last week after watching the episode and spending a few hours writing the review, it was nearly impossible to sleep with the images of the debrained judge swimming in my subconscious. Damn you, Bryan Fuller! This week's episode is again penned by Fuller (with Steve Lightfoot) so I guess it's off to the medicine cabinet for some Ambien once again!" Kevin Fitzpatrick of ScreenCrush wrote, "'Takiawase' rings much closer to the Hannibal we know and love, diving back into Will and Hannibal's battle of wits, with all the gorgeous yet unnerving imagery that usually keeps us so engrossed."
