= Futamono (Hannibal) =

- Hannibal episode
- Episode no.: Season 2 Episode 6
- Directed by: Tim Hunter
- Story by: Andy Black
- Teleplay by: Andy Black; Bryan Fuller; Scott Nimerfro; Steve Lightfoot
- Cinematography by: James Hawkinson
- Editing by: Ben Wilkinson
- Production code: 206
- Original air date: April 4, 2014
- Running time: 42 minutes

Guest appearances
- Eddie Izzard as Dr. Abel Gideon (special guest star); Raúl Esparza as Dr. Frederick Chilton; Anna Chlumsky as Miriam Lass; Ted Ludzik as Male Nurse; Jamaal Grant as Guard

Episode chronology
← Previous "Mukōzuke"	Next → "Yakimono"
- Hannibal season 2

"Futamono" is the sixth episode of the second season of the psychological thriller–horror series Hannibal. It is the 19th overall episode of the series and was written by Andy Black, series creator Bryan Fuller, co-executive producer Scott Nimerfro and executive producer Steve Lightfoot from a story by Black, and directed by Tim Hunter. It was first broadcast on April 4, 2014, on NBC.

The series is based on characters and elements appearing in Thomas Harris' novels Red Dragon and Hannibal, with focus on the relationship between FBI special investigator Will Graham (Hugh Dancy) and Dr. Hannibal Lecter (Mads Mikkelsen), a forensic psychiatrist destined to become Graham's most cunning enemy. The episode revolves around Will Graham attempting to get Jack Crawford on his side by explaining how the Chesapeake Ripper operates and how Hannibal Lecter is connected. Meanwhile, Abel Gideon gets into trouble at the hospital with evidence that could incriminate Lecter.

According to Nielsen Media Research, the episode was seen by an estimated 2.18 million household viewers and gained a 0.8/3 ratings share among adults aged 18–49. The episode received extremely positive reviews from critics, who praised the performances, character development, writing, visual style, cinematography, shock value and ending.

== Plot ==
Crawford (Laurence Fishburne) visits Graham (Hugh Dancy), confronting him about sending Matthew Brown to kill Lecter (Mads Mikkelsen). Graham denies trying to have Lecter killed, but affirms that Lecter is the Chesapeake Ripper and that as he is a cannibal, attacking in lots of three and four in order to maintain a good pace with the food. Crawford remains unconvinced, so Graham warns him that after the Ripper strikes again, Lecter will host a dinner party.

A corpse is found at a parking lot, attached to a tree with his organs replaced with poisonous flowers. Crawford approaches Lecter for help, but Lecter declines his offer following his assassination attempt. Nevertheless, he invites Crawford for a dinner party, which he accepts to attend. In his cell, Graham confronts Gideon (Eddie Izzard) for messing with his plans. During the conversation, Gideon states that Lecter instructed him to kill Bloom (Caroline Dhavernas) when he escaped from custody. Chilton (Raúl Esparza) has the meeting recorded and shows it to Crawford. While Chilton has suspicions, Crawford is more reserved about the statements.

Price (Scott Thompson) and Zeller (Aaron Abrams) identify the corpse as local city councilor Sheldon Isley, who brokered a development deal for the parking lot and is responsible for damages to the pre-existing habitat. All signs point to a 50-mile radius for the scene of Isley's death. Lecter visits Graham at the hospital, expressing his disappointment at his progress and actions, wanting to distance himself from Graham. Chilton questions Gideon about the recording, but Gideon denies meeting Lecter before his visit and embarrasses Chilton in front of Crawford. As he is escorted back to his cell, Gideon insults the nurse he previously killed and is brutally beaten by the guards.

At Lecter's dinner party, Crawford and Chilton engage in conversation about Lecter. Crawford excuses himself from the party with samples of the food, which he has Price and Zeller test in the BAU lab. After the party, Lecter and Bloom discuss distancing themselves from Graham; they kiss and sleep together. While she sleeps, Lecter leaves, revealing that he drugged her wine so she wouldn't wake up for a few hours. He sneaks into Gideon's room at the infirmary and kidnaps him, killing a guard and propping his body with fishing lures. Having remembered Graham's lead, Crawford visits Lecter in the morning to question him about his whereabouts, suggesting that Lecter is a prime suspect in Gideon's disappearance. Bloom shows up and defends Lecter by stating she was with him all night, unaware that Lecter had used her as an alibi.

That night, Lecter serves lotus leaf to Gideon, which is revealed to be Gideon's amputated leg. Seeing he is eating his last meal, Gideon does so willingly. Back at the lab, Crawford is informed that the food from the party doesn't contain human tissue. However, Price and Zeller find that the fishing lures contain DNA from many victims, including Miriam Lass. They finally realize that Graham is not the Ripper, as there was no copycat killer at all. The lures also contained a rare tree bark, which directs Crawford to an abandoned farmhouse in Somerville, Virginia. He breaks a locked door to get into a basement and checks cisterns for possible clues. He opens one and is shocked to discover Lass (Anna Chlumsky), who is still alive with her left arm missing.

== Production ==
In March 2014, it was announced that the sixth episode of the season would be titled "Futamono" and that it would be written by Andy Black, series creator Bryan Fuller, co-executive producer Scott Nimerfro and executive producer Steve Lightfoot from a story by Black, with Tim Hunter directing. This was Black's second writing credit, Fuller's 15th writing credit, Nimerfro's fifth credit, Lightfoot's 7th writing credit, and Hunter's fourth directing credit.

== Reception ==
=== Viewers ===
The episode was watched by 2.18 million viewers, earning a 0.8/3 in the 18-49 rating demographics on the Nielson ratings scale. This means that 0.8 percent of all households with televisions watched the episode, while 3 percent of all households watching television at that time watched it. This was a 38% decrease from the previous episode, which was watched by 3.49 million viewers with a 1.0/3 in the 18-49 demographics. With these ratings, Hannibal ranked third on its timeslot and tenth for the night in the 18-49 demographics, behind The Neighbors, Unforgettable, Dateline NBC, Grimm, Hawaii Five-0, Last Man Standing, Blue Bloods, 20/20, and Shark Tank.

With DVR factored, the episode was watched with a 1.4 on the 18-49 demo.

=== Critical reviews ===
"Futamono" received extremely positive reviews from critics. Eric Goldman of IGN gave the episode an "amazing" 9 out of 10 and wrote in his verdict: "This episode wasn't quite as strong as the previous two, and yet was still fantastic in its own right. Which is to say, Hannibal continues to excel, as Jack begins to get closer to the truth. And wow am I curious to see what Miriam's return will bring about..."

Molly Eichel of The A.V. Club gave the episode an "A−" and wrote, "'Futamono' marks the halfway point in our season two journey and is, aptly, a major turning point episode, an opinion I held before I even got to that ending. And, holy shit, what an ending. It's also a strange duck of an episode in terms of the Hannibal canon: the plot barreled forward, making major leaps and bounds; tonally, it felt a bit all over the map, veering from darkly hilarious to ethereally creepy. This episode was the roadmap the rest of the series will follow, I’m certainly ready for the rest of the journey."

Alan Sepinwall of HitFix wrote, "There are probably some storytelling things I should be questioning, like whether the Chesapeake Ripper's ongoing activities should be enough to cast doubt over Will's guilt, whether or not anyone believes Hannibal to be the Ripper. But the acting, the writing, the directing, the music and everything else is just so beautiful and evocative that at a certain point in each episode, I feel less like I'm watching it than that I'm being immersed in it." Mark Rozeman of Paste gave the episode a 9 out of 10 and wrote, "Granted, 'Futamono' may not stand quite at the same level as 'Takiawase' or 'Mukozuke' but it's made to serve a different purpose. It works as the show's halfway point and, as such, does an amazing job of instigating the changing of the tides." Gerri Mahn of Den of Geek gave the episode a 4 star rating out of 5 and wrote, "Every night since the first episode aired last year, before going to bed I get down on my knees and pray to Bryan Fuller for Hannibal sexy time. Finally, he decided to shine his benevolent creative light on this viewer."
