= Shiizakana (Hannibal) =

- Hannibal episode
- Episode no.: Season 2 Episode 9
- Directed by: Michael Rymer
- Written by: Jeff Vlaming; Bryan Fuller
- Cinematography by: James Hawkinson
- Editing by: Ben Wilkinson
- Production code: 209
- Original air date: April 25, 2014
- Running time: 43 minutes

Guest appearances
- Katharine Isabelle as Margot Verger; Jeremy Davies as Peter Bernardone; Chris Diamantopoulos as Clark Ingram; Mark O'Brien as Randall Tier; Paco Paquito Hernaci as Trucker; Brendee Greene as Female Beach Goer; Michael James Regan as Male Beach Goer

Episode chronology
← Previous "Su-zakana"	Next → "Naka-choko"
- Hannibal season 2

"Shiizakana" is the ninth episode of the second season of the psychological thriller–horror series Hannibal. It is the 22nd overall episode of the series and was written by co-executive producer Jeff Vlaming and series creator Bryan Fuller, and directed by executive producer Michael Rymer. It was first broadcast on April 25, 2014, on NBC.

The series is based on characters and elements appearing in Thomas Harris' novels Red Dragon and Hannibal, with focus on the relationship between FBI special investigator Will Graham (Hugh Dancy) and Dr. Hannibal Lecter (Mads Mikkelsen), a forensic psychiatrist destined to become Graham's most cunning enemy. The episode revolves around the murder of a truck driver, with evidence pointing that an animal committed the crime. As more evidence comes out, it appears that a man operating a mechanical suit is the perpetrator. Meanwhile, Graham meets another of Lecter's patients, Margot Verger (Katharine Isabelle), and both discover what their sessions with Lecter did to them.

According to Nielsen Media Research, the episode was seen by an estimated 2.45 million household viewers and gained a 0.9/3 ratings share among adults aged 18–49. The episode received positive reviews from critics, who praised the performances, although the case and pace received a mixed response.

== Plot ==
Graham (Hugh Dancy) has a dream where he has Lecter (Mads Mikkelsen) tied to a tree and uses a stag to kill him. Outside a gas station, a truck driver returns to his vehicle, until he notices someone jumped on the top of the truck. As he inspects, he is grabbed and killed by an unseen assailant.

Graham continues therapy with Lecter, with both challenging each other. As he leaves, he runs into Margot Verger (Katharine Isabelle), and both seem curious about the treatment that Lecter gave them. BAU inspects the crime scene, and Crawford (Laurence Fishburne) believes an animal committed the crime, having been trained by someone. Graham asks Peter Bernardone (Jeremy Davies), who is now incarcerated in a psychiatric ward. He deduces that animals committed the murders, but that the animals may have been manipulated into cooperating. That night, a man uses a mechanical beast suit and murders a couple.

At the crime scene, Graham deduces that it was a man, not animal, who committed the murders. Based on the evidence, Lecter tells Crawford that the profile fits a former patient of his, Randall Tier (Mark O'Brien), who now works at a museum. Before BAU reaches him, Lecter visits him, admiring how much he has grown and warns him that the FBI will look for him. When Crawford and Graham question him, Tier evades their suspicions based on Lecter's conversation. They are forced to leave as they lack any substantial evidence.

Margot meets with Graham at his house, and both realize how they had desires to kill a certain person (Margot wanted to kill her brother and Graham wanted to kill Lecter). He shares some of these concerns to Lecter at their next therapy. He also reveals that Bedelia Du Maurier (Gillian Anderson) visited at the hospital to say "I believe you", which seems to upset Lecter. Lecter then meets with Tier, instructing him to kill Graham at his house. Tier injures one of Graham's dogs, causing him to leave to rescue his dog. He returns to his house and locks himself in. He turns off the lights just as Tier jumps through a window. At his house, Lecter finds Graham waiting for him at his dining table, with Tier's corpse. Graham notes that as he sent someone to kill Lecter and Lecter did the same for him, they are now "even steven".

== Production ==
In January 2014, Bryan Fuller announced that the ninth episode of the season would be titled "Shiizakana". NBC would confirm the title in March 2014, with co-executive producer Jeff Vlaming and Fuller writing the episode and executive producer Michael Rymer directing. This was Fuller's 18th writing credit, Vlaming's second writing credit, and Rymer's 6th directing credit.

== Reception ==
=== Viewers ===
The episode was watched by 2.45 million viewers, earning a 0.9/3 in the 18-49 rating demographics on the Nielson ratings scale. This means that 0.9 percent of all households with televisions watched the episode, while 3 percent of all households watching television at that time watched it. This was a 13% decrease from the previous episode, which was watched by 2.80 million viewers with a 0.8/3 in the 18-49 demographics. With these ratings, Hannibal ranked third on its timeslot and tenth for the night in the 18-49 demographics, behind Unforgettable, Dateline NBC, Kitchen Nightmares, Grimm, Hawaii Five-0, 20/20, Last Man Standing, Blue Bloods rerun, and Shark Tank.

With DVR factored, the episode was watched with a 1.4 on the 18-49 demo.

=== Critical reviews ===
"Shiizakana" received positive reviews from critics. Eric Goldman of IGN gave the episode a "great" 8.5 out of 10 and wrote in his verdict: "We're in a slight holding pattern here, with Will freed and Hannibal no longer looking like a suspect, so it's hard not to be a bit anxious waiting for the other shoe to drop. But in the meantime, there's plenty to chew on examining just how complicated and fascinating the back and forth between Hannibal and Will has become, with the two now in this bizarre area where they are both brutal enemies and yet still confidants. As Hannibal put it, 'No one can be fully aware of another human being unless we love them,' and he really does love Will it seems – even if he's also quite willing to put Will's life on the line, to find out what the result will be. Lastly, I hope Buster is okay!!!"

Molly Eichel of The A.V. Club gave the episode an "A−" and wrote, "While Hannibal is certainly meant to be scary, 'Shiizakana' felt more like a classic entry into the horror genre than any previous episodes, with Hannibal acting as evil Svengali to an army of damaged people. Randall Tier was the first example of what Hannibal could do with the littlest of pushes, Will is his current project, while Margot Verger is an example of what could happen in the future. In 'Shiizakana', Hannibal acts as the Pied Piper of the damned."

Alan Sepinwall of HitFix wrote, "An hour with Hugh Dancy, Mads Mikkelsen and Laurence Fishburne playing these roles is never going to feel wasted, but I'm definitely eager to get into whatever the endgame is for season 2, and I wonder if it's going to get even harder in the future for the show to keep returning to the Killer of the Week well." Mark Rozeman of Paste gave the episode a 7.9 out of 10 and wrote, "For a show that's mostly noted for its graphic violence, Hannibal can sure be talky at times. And while I'm always quick to point out how the show, much like Breaking Bad before it, has developed a dexterous grasp of the slow burn, 'Shiizakana' seems to take this low-key, atmospheric quality maybe a step too far."

Gerri Mahn of Den of Geek gave the episode a 3.5 star rating out of 5 and wrote, "'Shiizakana' once again cleverly borrows imagery from the movies, specifically Graham's fantasy of decapitating Hannibal, which comes to us directly from Hannibal Rising. Getting your head wrenched off through the clever use of ropes and pulleys and a well-trained elk has to suck." Nick McHatton of TV Fanatic gave the episode a 4.2 star rating out of 5 and wrote, "Will's 'Even Stevens' approach to the delivery is a confirmation that Will can tap into his primal side and reach his 'higher plane' that Hannibal has been slowly trying to groom Will into. Ultimately, I believe Will is doing all of this, becoming a protégé of Hannibal's, as an opportunity to go undercover and understand who Hannibal really is. How he ticks and how he kills. That doesn't mean the ride isn't going to be enjoyable though."
