= Yakimono (Hannibal) =

- Hannibal episode
- Episode no.: Season 2 Episode 7
- Directed by: Michael Rymer
- Written by: Steve Lightfoot; Bryan Fuller
- Cinematography by: James Hawkinson
- Editing by: Stephen Philipson
- Production code: 207
- Original air date: April 11, 2014
- Running time: 42 minutes

Guest appearances
- Raúl Esparza as Dr. Frederick Chilton; Anna Chlumsky as Miriam Lass

Episode chronology
← Previous "Futamono"	Next → "Su-zakana"
- Hannibal season 2

"Yakimono" is the seventh episode of the second season of the psychological thriller–horror series Hannibal. It is the 20th overall episode of the series and was written by executive producer Steve Lightfoot and series creator Bryan Fuller, and directed by executive producer Michael Rymer. It was first broadcast on April 11, 2014, on NBC.

The series is based on characters and elements appearing in Thomas Harris' novels Red Dragon and Hannibal, with focus on the relationship between FBI special investigator Will Graham (Hugh Dancy) and Dr. Hannibal Lecter (Mads Mikkelsen), a forensic psychiatrist destined to become Graham's most cunning enemy. The episode revolves around the rescue of Miriam Lass, who is unable to identify her captor after years of seclusion. Will Graham is released from the hospital and sets out to investigate more about Lecter and his next move.

According to Nielsen Media Research, the episode was seen by an estimated 2.25 million household viewers and gained a 0.7/2 ratings share among adults aged 18–49. The episode received critical acclaim, with critics praising the performances (particularly Chlumsky and Esparza), the writing and twists.

== Plot ==
Miriam Lass (Anna Chlumsky) is taken by an ambulance and is tended for all her injuries. Crawford (Laurence Fishburne) questions her about her captivity, but she is struggling to remember her captor, only viewing him as a shadow. She also states that she wasn't spared by the kidnapper, but was "saved for last".

Lecter (Mads Mikkelsen) meets with Bloom (Caroline Dhavernas) at an interrogation room, with Crawford and Miriam watching him from a two-way mirror. Surprisingly, Miriam is certain that Lecter was not her captor. Meanwhile, due to the Chesapeake Ripper's new discoveries, all charges are dropped against Graham (Hugh Dancy) and is released from the Baltimore State Hospital for the Criminally Insane. He tells Dr. Chilton (Raúl Esparza) to recognize his unethical methods that he enforced on Gideon as Lecter enforced similar methods and may be involved with Gideon's disappearance.

Graham meets with Crawford, who takes him to the old farmhouse. He deduces that the Ripper didn't plan to kill Miriam, but have her rescued so he could blame someone else for the crimes. He returns home, where Bloom was guarding his dogs. While she apologizes for doubting him, she still reprimands him for trying to get Lecter killed. Seeing that she is in a relationship with Lecter, he warns her to stay away from him. He then visits Miriam, and realizes that the same stimulation of flashing lights was employed on her while in captivity, sensing that Lecter is involved. That night, he confronts Lecter in his house at gunpoint, feeling that killing him will feel right for him. Lecter allows himself to be aimed at, but ultimately Graham leaves.

Crawford takes Miriam with Lecter, hoping that a hypnotic regression therapy will help her remember. Miriam is only able to view the Wound Man as the last thing she remembered. At the lab, Price (Scott Thompson) and Zeller (Aaron Abrams) inform Crawford that they found Lecter's fingerprints on flowers around the farmhouse. Crawford dismisses it, as Graham pointed out that the Ripper will try to frame anyone in the crime scene. However, they also discovered that Miriam's blood contained certain medicaments employed by Chilton during his treatment of Gideon. Crawford demands that Lecter and Chilton be brought in for testimony.

Chilton arrives at his house but is confused by a medical equipment sound from his basement. He opens a room and is horrified to discover Gideon's mutilated corpse on a bed. He stumbles on his way out, and finds Lecter wearing a plastic suit just as FBI agents are knocking at his door. Lecter drugs Chilton, who passes out, and then kills the FBI agents. When Chilton wakes up, he finds the agents dead, with one of them mounted as the Wound Man. Desperate, Chilton asks Graham for help while BAU finds evidence incriminating Chilton. Chilton intends to flee the country but Graham has already contacted Crawford.

Chilton tries to escape through the woods but Crawford catches him and takes him into custody. In the interrogation room, he is questioned by Bloom while maintaining his innocence. Through the two-way mirror, Miriam's memory starts viewing the shadowed figure as Chilton, identifying him as the Chesapeake Ripper as she breaks down. Crawford consoles her but Miriam suddenly grabs his gun and fires at Chilton, hitting him in the face. At his office, Lecter is visited by Graham, who wants to resume therapy. They then sit, facing each other from their seats as they are about to start.

== Production ==
=== Development ===
In January 2014, Bryan Fuller announced that the seventh episode of the season would be titled "Yakimono". NBC would confirm the title in March 2014, with executive producer Steve Lightfoot and Fuller writing the episode and executive producer Michael Rymer directing. This was Fuller's 16th writing credit, Lightfoot's 8th writing credit, and Rymer's fifth directing credit.

=== Writing ===
The episode originally had a prologue where Alana Bloom was entering Hannibal Lecter's house, in a follow-up to the opening scene in "Kaiseki". However, Fuller abandoned the idea, saying "it felt like we were so much in the Miriam Lass world, and so intrinsically tied into Dr. Chilton's story and Will Graham's release, the scene felt out of place." The scene would later air in its entirety in the season finale, "Mizumono".

== Reception ==
=== Viewers ===
The episode was watched by 2.25 million viewers, earning a 0.7/2 in the 18-49 rating demographics on the Nielson ratings scale. This means that 0.7 percent of all households with televisions watched the episode, while 2 percent of all households watching television at that time watched it. This was a 3% increase from the previous episode, which was watched by 2.18 million viewers with a 0.8/3 in the 18-49 demographics. With these ratings, Hannibal ranked third on its timeslot and twelfth for the night in the 18-49 demographics, behind 108 Hours: Inside the Hunt for the Boston Marathon Bombers, The Neighbors, Unforgettable, two episodes of Kitchen Nightmares, Grimm, Last Man Standing, Hawaii Five-0, Blue Bloods, 20/20, and Shark Tank.

With DVR factored, the episode was watched with a 1.3 on the 18-49 demo.

=== Critical reviews ===
"Yakimono" received critical acclaim. Eric Goldman of IGN gave the episode a "masterpiece" 10 out of 10 and wrote in his verdict: "Farewell to Raúl Esparza, who was excellent as Dr. Chilton, bringing just the right mixture of humor, intelligence and overbearing smarm and narcissism to the role. The return of Miriam led to a supercharged Hannibal that showed us just how brilliant and diabolical Dr. Lecter can be, as he seemingly tied up all the loose ends on the Chesapeake Ripper case. Of course, Will still is absolutely sure of his guilt, while now once more sitting across from Dr. Lecter as his patient. Hannibal's interest in Will makes it impossible for him to resist continuing this relationship, which ultimately will likely be his undoing. In the meantime, we get the privilege of watching this wonderfully twisted tale play out."

Molly Eichel of The A.V. Club gave the episode a "B+" and wrote, "'Yakimono' didn’t feel as thematically rich or layered as previous episodes, especially in relation to how dense this season has been so far. But there were quite a few plot elements to get through and it sets off how the rest of the series will go."

Alan Sepinwall of HitFix wrote, "That's amazingly badass, but in a psychological way that plays to this show's distinctive strengths. Any generic TV hero can pump a few bullets into the evil serial killer, but Will is going to take down Hannibal the Cannibal his way, and hoo boy am I looking forward to seeing it." Mark Rozeman of Paste gave the episode an 8.7 out of 10 and wrote, "Hannibal is, above all else, a terrifyingly smart show. In an age where many TV viewers can effectively outline the progression of an episode or, better yet, an entire season based on the predictable formula typically woven into the DNA of network TV, this show is nothing short of an anomaly. Despite the fact that it's based on a popular book/film series with several bookmarked plot points, it's a program that still catches you off guard and leaves you wondering the ways in which it will zig and zag in reaching its inevitable destination."

Gerri Mahn of Den of Geek gave the episode a perfect 5 star rating out of 5 and wrote, "Holy crap! Miriam Lass is alive! Last week Crawford found her, dirty, disheveled, and missing one arm in the bottom of a cistern. The scene was reminiscent of Silence of the Lambs and the well in which Buffalo Bill kept his victims. The show runners over at Hannibal do love to appropriate imagery and dialog from the movies. And that, in turn, is why I love them." Nick McHatton of TV Fanatic gave the episode a 4.4 star rating out of 5 and wrote, "The greatest moment of the installment comes in the form of Will resuming his therapy. When Will drops this bombshell on Hannibal, there's a momentary look of confusion that flashes across his face. Hannibal has not planned for Will to come back to their friendship in his design plans. It's an entirely new Will Graham in that room. He's calm, cool, collected, poised, and ridiculously handsome. Will Graham is ready to play as a mental equal to Hannibal rather than being one step behind."
