= Mizumono (Hannibal) =

- Hannibal episode
- Episode no.: Season 2 Episode 13
- Directed by: David Slade
- Written by: Steve Lightfoot; Bryan Fuller
- Cinematography by: James Hawkinson
- Editing by: Stephen Philipson
- Production code: 213
- Original air date: May 23, 2014
- Running time: 44 minutes

Guest appearances
- Cynthia Nixon as Kade Prurnell; Gina Torres as Phyllis "Bella" Crawford; Lara Jean Chorostecki as Freddie Lounds; Kacey Rohl as Abigail Hobbs; Vladimir Jon Cubrt as Garret Jacob Hobbs

Episode chronology
← Previous "Tome-wan"	Next → "Antipasto"
- Hannibal season 2

"Mizumono" is the thirteenth episode and season finale of the second season of the psychological thriller–horror series Hannibal. It is the 26th overall episode of the series and was written by executive producer Steve Lightfoot and series creator Bryan Fuller, and directed by executive producer David Slade. It was first broadcast on May 23, 2014, on NBC.

The series is based on characters and elements appearing in Thomas Harris' novels Red Dragon and Hannibal, with focus on the relationship between FBI special investigator Will Graham (Hugh Dancy) and Dr. Hannibal Lecter (Mads Mikkelsen), a forensic psychiatrist destined to become Graham's most cunning enemy. The episode revolves around the last stand of Will Graham and the FBI in order to take down Hannibal Lecter, who is planning to escape with Graham.

According to Nielsen Media Research, the episode was seen by an estimated 2.35 million household viewers and gained a 0.8/3 ratings share among adults aged 18–49. The episode received universal acclaim from critics. Critics praised nearly every aspect of the episode, including Slade's directing, writing, performances, cinematography, twists, character development, visual style and musical score. The episode was named by TV Guide as the best episode of 2014, and it was also included in many lists by IndieWire and The Atlantic.

== Plot ==
Lecter (Mads Mikkelsen) writes a letter to Crawford (Laurence Fishburne), inviting him for dinner. Crawford notifies Graham (Hugh Dancy) about this, stating his plans when meeting with Lecter. He sees both Crawford and Lecter asking if they can count on him, and he says yes to both.

Lecter visits Bella (Gina Torres), whose cancer has worsened and is dying. She forgives Lecter for saving her, although she asks him to save Crawford after she dies. Graham meets with Freddie Lounds (Lara Jean Chorostecki), asking her to respect Abigail Hobbs' memory and not publish anything regarding her, allowing her to write about him and Lecter as he is not sure if he will survive this time. He then visits Lecter at his office to help destroy records of patients, planning to flee. During this, Lecter recognizes a smell from Graham's clothes, belonging to Lounds. Graham then has a final meal with Lecter, after previously talking with Bloom (Caroline Dhavernas), who now knows that Lecter is the Chesapeake Ripper.

Prurnell (Cynthia Nixon) confronts Crawford about his intentions, as well as covering for Graham during Randall Tier's mutilation. She cancels the operation and forces him to take a work absence, handing over his badge and gun. She informs Bloom that they will freeze Lecter's passport and get a search warrant. Bloom protests as Lecter had no incriminating evidence, but she shows him pictures of Tier's display, affirming that Crawford and Graham will be taken into custody for their alleged entrapment of Lecter and for Graham's mutilation of Tier's corpse. Bloom informs Graham about his incoming warrant just as FBI agents begin to appear at Graham's house. Graham escapes through his back door and, in order to earn his trust, calls Lecter to warn him that "they know".

Crawford visits Lecter's house and they start a brutal fight. Lecter stabs Crawford in the neck. Crawford locks himself in Lecter's pantry and, as he bleeds out, he calls Bella.

Lecter attempts to break down the pantry door as Bloom arrives at Lecter's home. She calls for the police and enters to find Hannibal holding Crawford at gunpoint.

As she blames herself for falling for him, Lecter tells her to leave, or he will kill her. Bloom pulls the trigger but Lecter already emptied the gun. She runs from him and hides in a room on the second floor, allowing her to reload her gun. A shadowed figure appears in the room. To Bloom's shock, she discovers that it is Abigail (Kacey Rohl), alive. Abigail says "I'm so sorry" and pushes Bloom out of the front window.

Graham arrives at the scene and finds Bloom, seriously wounded, lying on the ground in the heavy rain. Bloom indicates that Crawford is inside and Graham enters Hannibal's home, gun drawn, where he is shocked to find Abigail still alive.

Crying, Abigail explains to Graham that she only did what Lecter asked her to do. Lecter appears behind Graham. Graham asks Lecter why he didn't leave when he called to warn him.

Lecter explains, "We couldn't leave without you," and then stabs Graham with a linoleum knife. He reprimands Graham, saying he offered him the gift of knowing him, which Graham has rejected. Lecter asks Graham if he would deny him his life, and kill him. Graham replies, "No, not your life…" Lecter finishes Graham's thought by saying, "You would take my freedom." Lecter accuses Graham of wanting to change him. Graham, bleeding out, replies that he already has. Lecter forgives Graham for his betrayal, even if he does not forgive Lecter.

Lecter calls Abigail over to him and slits her throat in front of Graham. Abigail appears to Graham as the Ravenstag, which seems to die.

Lecter leaves Crawford, Graham and Abigail to bleed out. He walks outside, into the rain, passing Bloom, who remains on the ground where she has fallen, still conscious. The police approach the scene.

In a post-credits scene, Lecter is shown on a plane, headed to an unknown destination. Accompanying him is Bedelia Du Maurier (Gillian Anderson).

== Production ==
=== Development ===
In March 2014, Bryan Fuller announced that the thirteenth episode of the season would be titled "Mizumono". NBC would confirm the title in April 2014, with executive producer Steve Lightfoot and Fuller writing the episode and executive producer David Slade directing. This was Fuller's 21st writing credit, Lightfoot's 11th writing credit, and Slade's fifth directing credit.

=== Writing ===
Fuller said that Will Graham calling Hannibal Lecter to warn him about his incoming confrontation with Jack Crawford had different meanings. The first was that he feared Crawford could lose the fight and the other would be that he wanted Lecter to leave while he could spare Crawford's life. He further added, "Hannibal was seduced by humanity in a true form, by Will Graham. That kind of seduction surprises Hannibal, and it surprises him that he allowed it. And that's why his response to Will’s disloyalty was so brutal and spiteful and devastating."

Fuller viewed the episode as the closure of a story arc, "I felt like it was a fated conclusion to the story that we have been telling: Inasmuch as we were trying to garner sympathy for the devil, you also have to respect the devil — or else you're going to end up gutted on the floor." He commented, "I knew that I wanted to have Hannibal lay waste to the remaining cast and then drop the mic and leave the stage. That was the main goal. Really, we wanted to demonstrate how much Will hurt Hannibal. That was a big motivation for this entire finale: It had to be the nasty breakup. It had to be the terrible doom that everyone was rocketing toward because they dared to enter into a relationship with Hannibal Lecter and thought they could outsmart him."

Alana Bloom getting pushed out of the window was originally set to air as a prologue in "Yakimono". However, the producers decided to scrap the original idea, with Fuller explaining "it felt like we were so much in the Miriam Lass world, and so intrinsically tied into Dr. Chilton's story and Will Graham's release, the scene of Alana's fall felt out of place." When questioned about why Abigail pushed her out, Fuller reiterated that she followed Lecter's orders to push her, further adding "I don't think Abigail was comfortable with that at all. She was terrified and reluctant to do it but nevertheless had to. As a result, her faith in Hannibal started to shift."

Fuller described Lecter slitting Abigail's throat as "the act of a heartbroken man", also deeming it as an "indicator of just how deeply Will Graham got through to Hannibal Lecter on an emotional, connective level, and the hurt of the betrayal." He also teased, "There will be consequences for that last act. I mean, if left to my dithers in a consequence-free environment, I want everyone to survive, because I can see storylines for all of those characters. But I think that would be sort of a cheat to the audience, to say that everybody's left in devastation and everybody got away scot-free."

When questioned about the use of the credits rolling after the events of the house before transitioning to the plane scene, Fuller explained "we wanted separation between the finality of Hannibal Lecter walking out to the rain, having it wash over him, and cleanse him, and leaving this experience behind — an experience that has been beautiful but also demonstrative of his own weakness." He also said that Graham imagining the stag's death served to indicate the end of his relationship with Lecter, viewing his death as the end of the season and the plane scene as the beginning of the third season. Originally, Abigail would survive and she would be on the plane with Lecter, with her appearance in the house omitted to keep it as a surprise. However, Fuller decided that with Graham's betrayal, Lecter wouldn't go with her as she is "symbolic of his relationship with Will."

== Reception ==
=== Viewers ===
The episode was watched by 2.35 million viewers, earning a 0.8/3 in the 18-49 rating demographics on the Nielson ratings scale. This means that 0.8 percent of all households with televisions watched the episode, while 3 percent of all households watching television at that time watched it. This was a slight increase from the previous episode, which was watched by 2.32 million viewers with a 0.9/3 in the 18-49 demographics. It was also a 18% increase from the previous season finale, which was watched by 1.98 million viewers with a 0.8/2 in the 18-49 demographics. With these ratings, Hannibal ranked second on its timeslot and fifth for the night in the 18-49 demographics, behind a Shark Tank rerun, Dateline NBC, What Would You Do?, and 20/20.

With DVR factored, the episode was watched by 3.38 million viewers with a 1.3 on the 18-49 demo.

=== Critical reviews ===
"Mizumono" received universal acclaim from critics. Eric Goldman of IGN gave the episode a perfect "masterpiece" 10 out of 10 and wrote in his verdict: "The Hannibal: Season 2 finale didn't hold back in the slightest, wrapping up the season in a delightfully ghastly way that left all of our main characters – except for Hannibal himself, of course – in the worst circumstances possible, seemingly moments away from death. Completely blowing up the show's dynamic, 'Mizumono' left us with Hannibal getting away, joined by a shocking partner, as we ponder just how different this amazing series will be next year..."

Molly Eichel of The A.V. Club gave the episode an "A" and wrote, "The most amazing thing about 'Mizumono' — beyond its quality — is that it does not feel much like an episode of Hannibal, yet it is an entirely perfect cap to this season. It ups the dreamy qualities that have made the show so interesting from the beginning, but the biggest difference in 'Mizumono' is the pacing. There are quite a few things that have to happen before Hannibal can escape into the rain to what will be an inevitably truncated freedom. But the episode never feels rushed, or overstuffed. That aforementioned dreaminess has slowed proceedings down, giving the series a signature feel that is often punctuated with bouts of fast-paced action."

Alan Sepinwall of HitFix wrote, "Great show. Great season. So glad NBC's deal with Gaumont is keeping it around for more, and damn curious what the structure of the show will be with Hannibal as a fugitive, regardless of which FBI-adjacent characters make it out of his house alive." Mark Rozeman of Paste gave the episode a perfect 10 out of 10 and wrote, "'Mizumono' might just be the most perfect hour of television I'm likely to see all year. Walking around after the final image cut to black, I found myself feeling a strange, vacillating mixture of hardcore adrenaline and physical numbness. It's a feeling I've experienced only a handful of times in my life, each time indicating that I'd seen something that thoroughly blew me out of the water. 'Mizumono' finds everyone involved in the show at the top of their game and firing on all cylinders. It's an incendiary, bloody end to a profound season of television."

Gerri Mahn of Den of Geek gave the episode a 4.5 star rating out of 5 and wrote, "Oh what a terrible, beautiful, episode. An episode full of revelations and freaking gorgeous cinematography. The chess game has come to an end and not only has Hannibal won, he decides it is time to clear the board." Nick McHatton of TV Fanatic gave the episode a perfect 5 star rating out of 5 and wrote, "There was a duality in place on 'Mizumono'. It played mostly on the relationship Will has with Hannibal and the FBI, but it was clearly true for Hannibal as well. As the river of red snaked its way through Hannibal's home at the end of the installment, the two sides to Hannibal and Will were crushed and salvageable." Emma Dibdin of Digital Spy wrote, "And so the second season comes full circle, concluding with a beautiful, terrible reconstruction of the pilot episode's climactic finale in the Hobbs kitchen."
