= Kō No Mono =

- Hannibal episode
- Episode no.: Season 2 Episode 11
- Directed by: David Slade
- Written by: Jeff Vlaming; Andy Black; Bryan Fuller
- Cinematography by: James Hawkinson
- Editing by: Michael Doherty
- Production code: 211
- Original air date: May 9, 2014
- Running time: 44 minutes

Guest appearances
- Michael Pitt as Mason Verger; Katharine Isabelle as Margot Verger; Lara Jean Chorostecki as Freddie Lounds; Daniel Kash as Carlo; Ezio Bondi as Garage Attendant; Samuel Faraci as Franklin; Ray Kahnert as Minister; Kalen Davidson as Stag Man

Episode chronology
← Previous "Naka-choko"	Next → "Tome-wan"
- Hannibal season 2

"Kō No Mono" is the eleventh episode of the second season of the psychological thriller–horror series Hannibal. It is the 24th overall episode of the series and was written by co-executive producer Jeff Vlaming, Andy Black, and series creator Bryan Fuller, and directed by executive producer David Slade. It was first broadcast on May 9, 2014, on NBC.

The series is based on characters and elements appearing in Thomas Harris' novels Red Dragon and Hannibal, with focus on the relationship between FBI special investigator Will Graham (Hugh Dancy) and Dr. Hannibal Lecter (Mads Mikkelsen), a forensic psychiatrist destined to become Graham's most cunning enemy. The episode revolves around Freddie Lounds' murder after a burning body that identifies her shows up at a parking garage. Meanwhile, Margot Verger informs Lecter and Graham about her pregnancy, although Lecter has plans to reveal it to Mason during therapy.

According to Nielsen Media Research, the episode was seen by an estimated 1.95 million household viewers and gained a 0.7/2 ratings share among adults aged 18–49. The episode received critical acclaim, with critics praising the performances (especially Dancy, Isabelle and Pitt), writing, twists and character development.

== Plot ==
Lecter (Mads Mikkelsen) and Graham (Hugh Dancy) dine at Lecter' house, discussing the new path that Graham entered after his encounter with Freddie Lounds. Meanwhile, a parking garage security guard at the offices of TattleCrime sees a burning body in a wheelchair roll into the garage, eventually landing at Lounds' parking space.

Price (Scott Thompson) and Zeller (Aaron Abrams) find that the dental marks of the body is that of Lounds. During a therapy session, Margot (Katharine Isabelle) informs Lecter and Graham that she is pregnant with Graham's child, and while this could help her keep her family fortune, she wants to keep the news from Mason (Michael Pitt). At his estate, Mason makes a child cry and then puts his tear to drink on his martini. Bloom (Caroline Dhavernas) is worried about Graham's relationship with Lecter, deeming it "destructive". When she asks if he killed Lounds, he just gives her his weapon and tells her to practice with it. They later attend Lounds' funeral, where his comments give the impression that he killed her.

Mason starts therapy with Lecter, discussing his relationship with Margot and his father's fortune, deeming himself the only heir, but Lecter makes a comment suggesting that Margot could make an heir through pregnancy. At his estate, Mason talks to Margot about wanting an heir through her, terrifying her. Lecter and Graham discuss his incoming role as a father, with Lecter talking about playing a father figure role to his deceased sister Mischa and how he saw a similarity to her sister on Abigail. That night, Lounds' body is exhumed and distorted like Shiva. Graham concludes that the killer may have been a copycat of Lounds' killer. Lecter and Bloom talk about Graham's progress and Lecter learns through smell that Bloom has been practicing with a weapon.

That night, Margot packs her things, planning to leave the Mason Estate. As she is driving, her car is crashed by Verger's henchman, Carlo. She wakes up in an operating table, where Mason tells her his intentions of performing a surgery to make her infertile as the doctors start their process. Bloom confronts Crawford (Laurence Fishburne), as he has been keeping secrets from her. Crawford then leads her to a room, where she finds Lounds (Lara Jean Chorostecki) alive. Graham visits Margot at the hospital, and then visits Mason at his farm to attack him. He proceeds to hang him over his pigs, but changes his mind. Realizing that Lecter has been manipulating them, Graham suggests that Mason should feed Lecter to his pigs.

== Production ==
=== Development ===
In February 2014, Bryan Fuller announced that the eleventh episode of the season would be titled "Kō No Mono". NBC would confirm the title in April 2014, with co-executive producer Jeff Vlaming, Andy Black and Fuller writing the episode and executive producer David Slade directing. This was Fuller's 19th writing credit, Vlaming's third writing credit, Black's third writing credit and Slade's fourth directing credit.

== Reception ==
=== Viewers ===
The episode was watched by 1.95 million viewers, earning a 0.7/2 in the 18-49 rating demographics on the Nielson ratings scale. This means that 0.7 percent of all households with televisions watched the episode, while 2 percent of all households watching television at that time watched it. This was a 15% decrease from the previous episode, which was watched by 2.28 million viewers with a 0.9/4 in the 18-49 demographics. With these ratings, Hannibal ranked third on its timeslot and ninth for the night in the 18-49 demographics, behind Unforgettable, a Shark Tank rerun, Dateline NBC, Grimm, Hawaii Five-0, Blue Bloods, 20/20, and Shark Tank.

With DVR factored, the episode was watched with a 1.2 on the 18-49 demo.

=== Critical reviews ===
"Kō No Mono" received critical acclaim. Eric Goldman of IGN gave the episode an "amazing" 9.5 out of 10 and wrote in his verdict: "'Kō No Mono' was directed by David Slade, who directed the show's pilot and several Season 1 installments, and he certainly returned for a big episode – one that he brought his expert skills to, filled with wonderful Hannibal moments like the visual of the tea cup reforming. Mason Verger is now firmly established as an amazingly vile and disturbing character and while Will has attempted to take out Hannibal with another psychopath before, this time feels much more weighty and important. Most of us suspected Will was playing Hannibal, but it was not only great to have that confirmed at this point but in such a satisfying way, as we, and Alana, discovered Jack and Freddie's participation in what now appears to be a very elaborate trap for someone who has proven to be a very elusive target."

Molly Eichel of The A.V. Club gave the episode an "A−" and wrote, "Viva Freddie Lounds. At least for now. The pain in the ass journalist turns out to be not so dead after all. Here's what I really like about this show: I knew, as an informed viewer of television who understands the shaky verisimilitude of Hannibal's world, that Freddie Lounds was not dead. I laid it out all out for you guys; Jack could not let Will kill whoever he wants to, willy nilly, to catch one, decidedly evil, guy. Yet, when Freddie Lounds showed up and asked Alana how her funeral was, I experienced a shock. Not relief, but genuine shock."

Alan Sepinwall of HitFix wrote, "'Ko No Mono' is the sort of episode that I imagine will play better for someone binging season 2 at a later date than somebody watching week-to-week. It inches the Will/Hannibal fishing chess game a little – and even has a moment where Alana accuses Jack of moving pieces around on the board – but it's not until fairly late in the episode, when we find out the truth about Freddie Lounds and see what horrible fate Mason has planned for Margot, that it feels compelling as its own thing rather than part of the larger whole." Mark Rozeman of Paste gave the episode a 9 out of 10 and wrote, "Watching 'Ko No Mono', it does seem like the show's creative team designed this final stretch of episodes with the idea that it might be their final year. Luckily, we found out this week that this would not be the case. This news is great on multiple levels. Long-term, it means we'll be getting yet another year of Will and Hannibal duking it out. Short-term, it means that this upcoming season finale will contain the kind of heightened climatic activity that normally accompanies a show's series finale. Everyone wins."

Gerri Mahn of Den of Geek gave the episode a 4 star rating out of 5 and wrote, "There is not much time left in the season, and events appear to be snowballing fast. It feels as though Graham should have enough to convict Hannibal with now. But it looks like he and Crawford are holding out for hard evidence. Maybe even a straight up confession?" Nick McHatton of TV Fanatic gave the episode a 4.4 star rating out of 5 and wrote, "Hannibal does not pray. If he did, he certainly would not close his eyes to do so. As 'Ko No Mono' demonstrated, Hannibal is not without remorse - but that does not mean Hannibal is the type of man to cower down to a God. Why? Because he is a God in his own eyes."
