= Naka-choko (Hannibal) =

- Hannibal episode
- Episode no.: Season 2 Episode 10
- Directed by: Vincenzo Natali
- Story by: Steve Lightfoot; Kai Yu Wu
- Teleplay by: Steve Lightfoot
- Cinematography by: James Hawkinson
- Editing by: Stephen Philipson
- Production code: 210
- Original air date: May 2, 2014
- Running time: 44 minutes

Guest appearances
- Michael Pitt as Mason Verger; Katharine Isabelle as Margot Verger; Lara Jean Chorostecki as Freddie Lounds; Mark O'Brien as Randall Tier; Daniel Kash as Carlo

Episode chronology
← Previous "Shiizakana"	Next → "Kō No Mono"
- Hannibal season 2

"Naka-choko" is the tenth episode of the second season of the psychological thriller–horror series Hannibal. It is the 23rd overall episode of the series and was written by executive producer Steve Lightfoot from a story by Lightfoot and Kai Yu Wu, and directed by Vincenzo Natali. It was first broadcast on May 2, 2014, on NBC.

The series is based on characters and elements appearing in Thomas Harris' novels Red Dragon and Hannibal, with focus on the relationship between FBI special investigator Will Graham (Hugh Dancy) and Dr. Hannibal Lecter (Mads Mikkelsen), a forensic psychiatrist destined to become Graham's most cunning enemy. The episode revolves around Graham and Lecter's progress into their therapy and their personal effects as Randall Tier's corpse is found in a museum. Meanwhile, Margot Verger (Katharine Isabelle) learns of a new plan from her brother Mason (Michael Pitt), while Freddie Lounds (Lara Jean Chorostecki) attempts to find more about Graham and Lecter.

According to Nielsen Media Research, the episode was seen by an estimated 2.28 million household viewers and gained a 0.9/4 ratings share among adults aged 18–49. The episode received mostly positive reviews from critics, who praised Michael Pitt's performance, character development and Graham's actions in the episode, although some expressed frustration at its pace.

== Plot ==
As Graham locks his house, Randall Tier (Mark O'Brien) breaks through his window. He drops his shotgun and fights with him, viewing him as the stag man and then as Lecter. He eventually overpowers him, killing him. He takes his body to Lecter's house, saying they are even now.

BAU investigates a murder found at the museum, where Tier's body has been mutilated and its part were displayed over a saber-tooth exhibition. Lecter and Graham analyze possible methods and motives, not revealing their role in his death. Graham meets Freddie Lounds, who still believes in his statement that Lecter is the Chesapeake Ripper, even when Graham is now saying that Dr. Frederick Chilton (Raúl Esparza) was the Chesapeake Ripper. During therapy, Lecter tells Margot that she hasn't killed her brother Mason because she still loves him despite his abuse. She explains that her father disinherited her after she came out as a lesbian, and willed all his money to Mason and any future heir he might have; if Mason dies childless, she gets nothing. Lecter suggests that she could get revenge at Mason by getting pregnant.

Margot visits Mason at his estate. Mason takes her to the barn and shows her that he is working with specially bred pigs on a maze, hoping that the animals will eat people. He then tells her that he wants to have a "Verger baby", the implication being that he wants to father his own sister's child. Disgusted, Margot visits Graham and, after revealing the scars her brother inflicted upon her, has sex with him. The scene is intercut with a scene where Lecter and Alana Bloom (Caroline Dhavernas) have sex at Lecter's house, while Graham views Bloom instead of Margot, then envisioning the humanoid form of the Ravenstag that represents the relationship between Graham and Lecter as he climaxes.

Lounds approaches Bloom on the campus, noting that there is a pattern between Lecter's patients dying and even suggests that he and Graham are killing. Lecter decides to visit Mason at his barn, who is concerned about anything her sister could reveal about him. Lecter tells him not to worry about anything and even offers to take Mason as a patient. Mason accepts and gives one of the pigs to Lecter, who serves it that night while dining with Bloom and Graham. When Bloom reveals the theory that Lounds told her, Lecter puts on his plastic suit and waits at her apartment to kill her. However, Lounds is visiting Graham's house while he is not there. She sneaks into his barn, discovering Tier's mechanical beast suit. She also finds a freezer and is horrified to discover Tier's jawbone just as Graham appears.

Graham attempts to explain but Lounds shoots at him, prompting a fight. She escapes the barn and dials Crawford while she starts her car. However, Graham breaks the window and takes her. Crawford notifies Graham about the message, which only contain her unintelligible scream and whose signal was traced back to Graham's area. Graham excuses it as Lounds was going to interview him and never arrived. Crawford and Bloom are suspicious of the claim but cannot prove anything. That night, Graham visits Lecter to bring him a meat to learn how to cook it, suggested to be from Lounds. They eat it, with Lecter noting that it is not pork, to which Graham only says is "long pig". The episode ends with a debate between Lecter and Graham about good and evil, with Lecter refusing to describe himself as evil, and asking Graham if their meal was an act of God.

== Production ==
=== Development ===
In April 2014, it was announced that the tenth episode of the season would be titled "Naka-choko" and that it would be written by executive producer Steve Lightfoot from a story by Lightfoot and Kai Yu Wu with Vincenzo Natali directing. This was Lightfoot's 10th writing credit, Wu's second writing credit, and Natali's second directing credit.

=== Casting ===
In January 2014, it was reported that the season would introduce Mason Verger, a character from the novel, Hannibal. Later, Michael Pitt joined the series to play Mason, "an unstable wealthy patient of Dr. Hannibal Lecter who begins a dangerous cat-and-mouse game with the deadly serial killer." Fuller described the character, "He's kind of a pimp. He's styled within an inch of his life. When you meet him, he's in this white fur coat and he looks fantastic. He's got this shock of hair and he's with pigs. We know Mason Verger is a very charming guy. Even when he was terribly mauled in that wheelchair he's a purple character, so he has a tremendous amount of humor and with that goes the charm."

== Reception ==
=== Viewers ===
The episode was watched by 2.28 million viewers, earning a 0.9/4 in the 18-49 rating demographics on the Nielsen ratings scale. This means that 0.9 percent of all households with televisions watched the episode, while 4 percent of all households watching television at that time watched it. This was a 7% decrease from the previous episode, which was watched by 2.45 million viewers with a 0.9/3 in the 18-49 demographics. With these ratings, Hannibal ranked third on its timeslot and ninth for the night in the 18-49 demographics, behind Kitchen Nightmares, Unforgettable, Dateline NBC, Hawaii Five-0, Grimm, Blue Bloods, 20/20, and Shark Tank.

With DVR factored, the episode was watched with a 1.4 on the 18-49 demo.

=== Critical reviews ===
"Naka-choko" received mostly positive reviews from critics. Eric Goldman of IGN gave the episode an "amazing" 9 out of 10 and wrote in his verdict: "The end of the episode had Will proclaim, 'I've given up good and evil for behaviorism,' as he and Hannibal ate Maybe-Freddie. And yet, earlier in the hour, Freddie brought up Abigail to Will, saying that even if she gave up the story she was pursuing about Hannibal in fact being the Ripper, she would 'never let that go.' Will pointedly told her, 'Neither will I,' insinuating he too is still after justice for Abigail. Abigail, who we saw Will dream about earlier this season, in a kind, fatherly way, still clearly mourning her. So there is still room for Will playing one hell of a long con here with Hannibal – doing things as twisted as violating Randall's corpse in the name of luring Hannibal into a place of security... And maybe even holding Freddie captive. Hell, maybe even holding Freddie captive, while removing a piece of her, a la Miriam Lass? But if Will actually killed Freddie, well, that just makes him a murderer, willing to cross any line, even if it's with the end goal of revenge against Hannibal. But I'm still holding out for the best for Will Graham... even if there's no way he's getting through this thing without some serious psychological scarring."

Molly Eichel of The A.V. Club gave the episode a "B" and wrote, "In the kaiseki meal that the second season follows, naka-choko is a palate cleanser. Like many episodes before, it's an apt title, clearing the way for Mason's plotline and the eventual duel we saw at the beginning. But by accomplishing its goal, 'Naka-Choko' was a loose episode, torn between the ongoing plot and the setting up of another."

Alan Sepinwall of HitFix wrote, "Watching 'Naka-Choko' felt a bit like attending a performance by a great magician. Even if you go in knowing it's fake, and determined to find the truth behind the illusions, you're damned if you can actually identify how the trick works." Mark Rozeman of Paste gave the episode a 7.7 out of 10 and wrote, "Furthermore, with its abundance of unnerving visuals, 'Naka-Choko' really brings to mind the latter batch of episodes from season one. Many such installments initially appeared practically incoherent, only to come together once viewed through the prism of Will's descent into insanity. Maybe future episodes will help contextualize 'Naka-Choko' in retrospect. For now, it just seems to be a meandering, if beautifully photographed, hour stuck between advancing the plot and diving into the minds of our two leads."

Laura Akers of Den of Geek wrote, "With only three more episodes left this series, the triangle between Alana, Will, and Hannibal may turn out to be nowhere as interesting as this one between Mason, Margot, and Hannibal. Who murders whom and how will make for a good time. And not just for the audience." Nick McHatton of TV Fanatic gave the episode a 3.6 star rating out of 5 and wrote, "Mason Verger's introduction makes one hope that Hannibal will be killing him off quickly, so he must be doing something right. Margot's downright fear of him is palpable in every scene they share and he makes use of it every chance he has."
