= Su-zakana (Hannibal) =

- Hannibal episode
- Episode no.: Season 2 Episode 8
- Directed by: Vincenzo Natali
- Written by: Scott Nimerfro; Bryan Fuller; Steve Lightfoot
- Cinematography by: James Hawkinson
- Editing by: Michael Doherty
- Production code: 208
- Original air date: April 18, 2014
- Running time: 44 minutes

Guest appearances
- Katharine Isabelle as Margot Verger; Jeremy Davies as Peter Bernardone; Chris Diamantopoulos as Clark Ingram; Martin Julien as Stable Hand; Douglas Hughes as Veterinarian; Christine Ebadi as Sarah Craber

Episode chronology
← Previous "Yakimono"	Next → "Shiizakana"
- Hannibal season 2

"Su-zakana" is the eighth episode of the second season of the psychological thriller–horror series Hannibal. It is the 21st overall episode of the series and was written by co-executive producer Scott Nimerfro, series creator Bryan Fuller and executive producer Steve Lightfoot, and directed by Vincenzo Natali. It was first broadcast on April 18, 2014, on NBC.

The series is based on characters and elements appearing in Thomas Harris' novels Red Dragon and Hannibal, with focus on the relationship between FBI special investigator Will Graham (Hugh Dancy) and Dr. Hannibal Lecter (Mads Mikkelsen), a forensic psychiatrist destined to become Graham's most cunning enemy. The episode revolves around Graham returning to work with the FBI, this time investigating the corpse of a woman found in a dead horse's uterus. While an employee appears to be a suspect, Graham has his reservations on the suspect. Meanwhile, Lecter starts therapy with Margot Verger (Katharine Isabelle), who has been sexually abused by her brother Mason (Michael Pitt).

According to Nielsen Media Research, the episode was seen by an estimated 2.80 million household viewers and gained a 0.8/3 ratings share among adults aged 18–49. The episode received very positive reviews from critics, who praised the performances and return to a more "held-back" structure.

== Plot ==
Graham catches a fish and brings it to Lecter so they can have dinner with Jack Crawford (Laurence Fishburne). Meanwhile, a farmer asks a veterinarian to inspect a dead horse at a stall. When the veterinarian opens the horse's uterus, they are shocked to discover a dead woman inside.

Mason Verger sexually assaults his sister Margot, collecting her tears and stirring them into his martini. She attends therapy with Lecter, explaining how Mason has been abusing her for years, and that she is planning on attacking him. Lecter states that he would have to report her if she plans to harm him, but also encourages her to defend herself. At BAU, Price (Scott Thompson) and Zeller (Aaron Abrams) perform an autopsy and are shocked when the corpse appears to have a heartbeat. When they open her chest cavity, a live bird flies out of her body.

Graham inspects the stable, deducing that the killer inserted her in the uterus in order to be "reborn". They question employee Peter Bernardone (Jeremy Davies), who denies any involvement. His behavior prompts Graham to consider him a suspect, but not the killer. The FBI conducts inspection on mass burial ground after finding soil in the victim's throat, finding up to 15 bodies and an empty grave belonging to the woman found in the horse. Graham privately questions Peter again, who confesses that he had the soil inserted to lead to social worker Clark Ingram (Chris Diamantopoulos), who is probably involved in the murders. Clark is brought to interrogation, where Graham is suspicious of him and even considers that he could manipulate Peter. Due to lack of evidence, Clark is released.

At the stable, Peter discovers a horse that injured him earlier, dead. Clark appears, having killed the horse with a hammer, intending to frame him. A few moments later, Graham and Lecter arrive at the stable, finding that Peter has sewn Clark into the horse. However, Clark is not actually dead, as Peter wants him to suffer like his victims. As Peter and Graham talk, Clark emerges from the horse, intending to kill Peter with the hammer, until Graham appears holding him at gunpoint. Graham intends to kill him for his treatment of Peter, but just as he pulls the trigger of his revolver, Lecter blocks its hammer with his thumb before taking the gun away, sparing Clark. As the episode ends, Lecter notes how Graham's unpredictability got the best of him despite his manipulations, which he finds impressive.

== Production ==
=== Development ===
In January 2014, Bryan Fuller announced that the eighth episode of the season would be titled "Su-zakana". NBC would confirm the title in March 2014, with co-executive producer Scott Nimerfro, Fuller, and executive producer Steve Lightfoot writing the episode and Vincenzo Natali directing. This was Fuller's 17th writing credit, Nimerfro's 6th writing credit, Lightfoot's 9th writing credit, and Natali's first directing credit.

=== Casting ===
In January 2014, it was reported that the season would introduce Margot Verger, a character from the novel, Hannibal. Later, Katharine Isabelle joined the series to play Margot, "a potential romantic interest for Will who also happens to be a patient of The Carnivorous One. [...] Margot has suffered years of abuse at the hands of her serial-killer twin brother."

A few days later, Jeremy Davies and Chris Diamantopoulos were announced as guest stars. Davies played Peter Bernardone, "an animal rescue worker who becomes a suspect when a bizarre murder is discovered at a stable where he once worked"; Diamantopoulos played Clark Ingram, "Peter's longtime social worker who has perhaps been too influential in his client's life".

== Reception ==
=== Viewers ===
The episode was watched by 2.80 million viewers, earning a 0.8/3 in the 18-49 rating demographics on the Nielson ratings scale. This means that 0.8 percent of all households with televisions watched the episode, while 3 percent of all households watching television at that time watched it. This was a 24% increase from the previous episode, which was watched by 2.25 million viewers with a 0.7/2 in the 18-49 demographics. With these ratings, Hannibal ranked third on its timeslot and ninth for the night in the 18-49 demographics, behind Kitchen Nightmares, Unforgettable, a Blue Bloods rerun, The Neighbors, Dateline NBC, Last Man Standing, Shark Tank, and 20/20.

With DVR factored, the episode was watched with a 1.4 on the 18-49 demo.

=== Critical reviews ===
"Su-zakana" received very positive reviews from critics. Eric Goldman of IGN gave the episode a "great" 8.8 out of 10 and wrote in his verdict: "After several episodes in a row of insanely building tension, Hannibal quieted down a bit this week. You know, just a quiet episode where people were sewn inside horses! The new/old dynamic of Will as Hannibal's patient has a fun new twist to it, with Will now likely trying to manipulate Hannibal as much as Hannibal's trying to manipulate him... and they both know it, which is what makes it oh-so sick and fun."

Molly Eichel of The A.V. Club gave the episode an "A−" and wrote, "'Su-zakana' is a return to the structure of Hannibal's first season: team unity, case-of-the-week, Hannibal and Will together again. The first eight episodes of the second season were so markedly different from the first season. Those two arcs were a bold and exciting avenues of exploration for Hannibal, which had, for the most part, introduced itself with cases of the week that largely tied into the themes of series. That the show is defaulting back to that position that it started in and it feels like the next step rather than a regression to a simpler structure is a testament to where this season has been and it is going."

Alan Sepinwall of HitFix wrote, "After such an eventful, crazy, borderline apocalyptic stretch of episodes like we've had the last few weeks, it was inevitable and probably necessary that Bryan Fuller would have to ease back on the throttle a bit. The recent pace wasn't sustainable, even in a 13-episode series, unless the plan was for the show to end this year." Mark Rozeman of Paste gave the episode a 9.1 out of 10 and wrote, "'Su-zakana' is exactly the type of episode Hannibal needs at the moment. As great as the last stretch of episodes has been, it's always good for a show to switch up the pacing lest it dry up a juicy storyline via simple overexposure."

Gerri Mahn of Den of Geek gave the episode a 4 star rating out of 5 and wrote, "This week's episode is practically overflowing with layers and layered meaning; albeit the layers take one helluva interesting … shape." Nick McHatton of TV Fanatic gave the episode a 4.8 star rating out of 5 and wrote, "Like a phoenix rising from the ashes signifying rebirth (or a bird escaping a woman's corpse stuffed into a horse), so too does Will Graham rise from his own ashes to revive his quest against Hannibal. The game of cat and mouse between Hannibal and Will is largely over. As 'Su-zakana' demonstrates, it's all about mind games now."
