= Relevés =

- Hannibal episode
- Episode no.: Season 1 Episode 12
- Directed by: Michael Rymer
- Written by: Chris Brancato; Bryan Fuller
- Cinematography by: James Hawkinson
- Editing by: Ben Wilkinson
- Production code: 112
- Original air date: June 13, 2013
- Running time: 44 minutes

Guest appearances
- Gillian Anderson as Bedelia Du Maurier (special guest star); Scott Thompson as Jimmy Price; Aaron Abrams as Brian Zeller; Kacey Rohl as Abigail Hobbs; Lara Jean Chorostecki as Freddie Lounds; Ellen Muth as Georgia Madchen; Mark Rendall as Nicholas Boyle; Brittney Johnston as Flight Attendant

Episode chronology
← Previous "Rôti"	Next → "Savoureux"
- Hannibal season 1

"Relevés" is the twelfth episode of the first season of the psychological thriller–horror series Hannibal. The episode was written by executive producer Chris Brancato and series creator Bryan Fuller, and directed by Michael Rymer. It was first broadcast on June 13, 2013, on NBC.

The series is based on characters and elements appearing in Thomas Harris' novels Red Dragon and Hannibal, with focus on the relationship between FBI special investigator Will Graham (Hugh Dancy) and Dr. Hannibal Lecter (Mads Mikkelsen), a forensic psychiatrist destined to become Graham's most cunning enemy. The episode revolves around the murder of Georgia Madchen, with BAU deeming it a suicide. However, Graham is determined to find the culprit, certain that it was murder. The investigation leads Graham to ask Abigail Hobbs for help, which may actually reveal her role in her father's crimes.

According to Nielsen Media Research, the episode was seen by an estimated 2.10 million household viewers and gained a 0.7/2 ratings share among adults aged 18–49. The episode received extremely positive reviews from critics, who praised the creepy atmosphere, writing, performances and build-up to the season finale.

== Plot ==
Graham (Hugh Dancy) visits Georgia (Ellen Muth), whose condition seems to be improving, inside a hyperbaric chamber. Georgia warns him that the doctors will give him wrong diagnoses and will struggle to understand him. Following an offhand comment by Graham, Lecter (Mads Mikkelsen) leaves a comb in Georgia's chamber, who accidentally sparks a fire inside the chamber and is burned to death. Meanwhile, Abigail (Kacey Rohl) starts working with Lounds (Lara Jean Chorostecki) on her book, omitting certain details which would implicate her in Nicholas Boyle's death. As the BAU investigates Georgia's demise, Crawford (Laurence Fishburne) considers it suicide but Graham disagrees. Graham checks himself out of the hospital and shares his theory that Georgia was killed by a copycat of Garret Jacob Hobbs. Worried about Graham, Crawford questions Lecter about his state of mind, but Lecter's answers make him question if he is hiding something from him.

Crawford visits Bedelia (Gillian Anderson) to ask about Lecter and if he has ever said something about Graham. Bedelia does not give much information, except for a time where Lecter referred one of his patients to her, which culminated in an attack. Graham asks Abigail for help in catching the copycat, which requires going to Hobbs' former cabin in Minnesota. He states his plans to Lecter, also theorizing that Sutcliffe's killer planned to frame Graham before Georgia walked in. Crawford learns from Price (Scott Thompson) and Zeller (Aaron Abrams) that Hobbs was with Abigail on the same train with some of his victims and wrongfully thinks that she killed Sutcliffe and Georgia. When Crawford arrives to question her, he finds that Graham already left with her.

Crawford confronts Lecter about Graham's treatment, although Lecter defends his stance as he wanted to properly diagnose Graham. He shares recordings where Graham felt he killed Marissa and suggests that he was the last person who saw Georgia and Sutcliffe before their deaths. He indicates that Graham may delusionally view himself as Hobbs and, as Hobbs was going to kill Abigail before his death, he may do the same. Arriving at the lodge, Graham realizes that Hobbs used her as bait to get his victims, just as his condition worsens and his behavior becomes more erratic. Graham suddenly finds himself on a plane back home, with no sign of Abigail. Abigail has returned to her old house, where Lecter awaits her. She is comforted by Lecter and is told that Crawford knows she was involved with her father's crimes. Lecter admits to having killed more people than her father. When Abigail asks him if he is going to kill her, he tells her that he is sorry he couldn't protect her in this life.

== Production ==
=== Development ===
In May 2013, it was announced that the twelfth episode of the series would be titled "Relevés", and was directed by Michael Rymer and written by executive producer Chris Brancato and series creator Bryan Fuller. This was Fuller's 9th writing credit, Brancato's third writing credit, and Rymer's third directing credit.

In the screeners of the episode sent to critics, Fuller explained the title:

"The penultimate episode 'Relevés,' also known as the Piece de resistance or 'Main Course,' lives up to its place on the menu as a showpiece. The various ingredients and plot threads highlighted over the season-long arcs are brought to a boil with tantalizing reveals and dramatic confessions, all served on a delectable plate."

=== Writing ===
When questioned about Bedelia's actions, Fuller explained "It felt like we were setting up a very cool mystery by giving a lot of information, enough where the audience could really connect the dots if they wanted to, but not spelling it out so clearly that it was explicit."

== Reception ==
=== Viewers ===
The episode was watched by 2.10 million viewers, earning a 0.7/2 in the 18-49 rating demographics on the Nielson ratings scale. This means that 0.7 percent of all households with televisions watched the episode, while 2 percent of all households watching television at that time watched it. This was a 12% decrease from the previous episode, which was watched by 2.36 million viewers with a 0.9/3 in the 18-49 demographics. With these ratings, Hannibal ranked third on its timeslot and ninth for the night in the 18-49 demographics, behind Does Someone Have to Go?, a Person of Interest rerun, an Elementary rerun, Jimmy Kimmel Live: Game Night, a Two and a Half Men rerun, Hell's Kitchen, a The Big Bang Theory rerun, and the fourth game of the 2013 NBA Finals.

=== Critical reviews ===
"Relevés" received extremely positive reviews from critics. Eric Goldman of IGN gave the episode an "amazing" 9 out of 10 and wrote, "We didn't actually see Hannibal kill Abigail as the episode ended, but things looked dire for her. It's a thrilling scenario for everyone involved at this point, and Hannibal – the man and the series – has orchestrated everything brilliantly, as we go into a can't-miss season finale."

Molly Eichel of The A.V. Club gave the episode a "B+" and wrote, "As much as I liked 'Relevés' as a set-up for a finale I'm quite excited for, it was also the episode where I most acutely felt how short 13 episodes can feel. Hannibal is well-plotted, and Bryan Fuller and co. managed to blend the serial story with smaller episodic ones on a Justified-esque level. But what could they have done with more? The back half of the season has largely focused on the Will-Hannibal dynamic, and in the process, Jack has been relegated to a smaller role, which is a shame considering how commanding Laurence Fishburne is when given something meaty to do."

Alan Sepinwall of HitFix wrote, "Fuller and company took their time to lay out the Will/Hannibal 'friendship', the future of Abigail Hobbs (here told the chilling words 'I'm sorry I couldn't protect you in this life' from Dr. Lecter), the complex and uneasy work relationship between Will and Jack, etc., and all that groundwork is paying off hugely here at the end." Laura Akers of Den of Geek wrote, "In this week's 'Relevés', Bryan Fuller holds a mirror up to all of us watching, and we finally see, in the reflection, Hannibal Lecter staring back. And the most frightening thing about it? We'll all still tune in next week." Kevin Fitzpatrick of ScreenCrush wrote, "'Relevés' offers up a much more low-key hour of Hannibal all things considered, with few real deaths of note or genuine scenes of peril, but the episode certainly sets the table for a stunning finish, in which Hannibal is sure to deliver its finest course yet. Hannibal's subtle manipulations have seemingly turned Jack against Will and ultimately cost Abigail her life, and there doesn't seem to be any turning back for at least one character to wind up behind bars by the end of the season."
