= Savoureux =

- Hannibal episode
- Episode no.: Season 1 Episode 13
- Directed by: David Slade
- Written by: Steve Lightfoot; Bryan Fuller; Scott Nimerfro
- Cinematography by: James Hawkinson
- Editing by: Michael Doherty
- Production code: 113
- Original air date: June 20, 2013
- Running time: 43 minutes

Guest appearances
- Gillian Anderson as Bedelia Du Maurier (special guest star); Scott Thompson as Jimmy Price; Aaron Abrams as Brian Zeller; Kacey Rohl as Abigail Hobbs; Vladimir Cubrt as Garret Jacob Hobbs; Krista Patton as Louise Hobbs; Marcel Lewis as Cop #1; Wayne Hissong as Cop #2; Omar Habib as Guard; Kalen Davidson as Stag Man

Episode chronology
← Previous "Relevés"	Next → "Kaiseki"
- Hannibal season 1

"Savoureux" is the thirteenth episode and season finale of the first season of the psychological thriller–horror series Hannibal. The episode was written by Steve Lightfoot, series creator Bryan Fuller, and supervising producer Scott Nimerfro, and directed by executive producer David Slade. It was first broadcast on June 20, 2013, on NBC.

The series is based on characters and elements appearing in Thomas Harris' novels Red Dragon and Hannibal, with focus on the relationship between FBI special investigator Will Graham (Hugh Dancy) and Dr. Hannibal Lecter (Mads Mikkelsen), a forensic psychiatrist destined to become Graham's most cunning enemy. The episode revolves around Will Graham questioning his sanity after discovering Abigail Hobbs has not been found, except for her human ear in his kitchen. As his world starts to collapse, he asks Lecter for help in finding the truth.

According to Nielsen Media Research, the episode was seen by an estimated 1.98 million household viewers and gained a 0.8/2 ratings share among adults aged 18–49. The episode received universal acclaim from critics, who praised Slade's directing, visual style, writing, performances, and twists.

== Production ==
=== Development ===
In May 2013, it was announced that the thirteenth episode of the series would be titled "Savoureux", and was directed by Michael Rymer and written by Steve Lightfoot, series creator Bryan Fuller, and supervising producer Scott Nimerfro. This was Fuller's 10th writing credit, Lightfoot's third writing credit, Nimerfro's third writing credit, and Slade's third directing credit.

As with the previous episode, Fuller explained the title in the screeners of the episode sent to critics. He viewed "Savoureux" as "the final course of the meal meant for the diner who wants to close out their twelfth round with something savory rather than sweet."

=== Writing ===
A concept that Fuller wanted to explore was on the novel Red Dragon, where Will Graham was institutionalized after facing the Minnesota Shrike. The series was based on that small background, intending to answer what happened. Commenting on Lecter blaming Graham, he said "it was pretty meticulously plotted. We knew that there were certain changes along the way, like we were originally going to deal with both the copycat killer and the Chesapeake Ripper in the first season, and then it felt like, as we got further into this season, that the story should be about the copycat killer primarily, and that the Chesapeake Ripper should serve to complicate Jack Crawford’s character. Then we could spike that ball in the second season."

The final scene was modeled after an iconic scene in The Silence of the Lambs, with the roles now given to Graham and Lecter. Fuller had the ending planned when he pitched the series, and it was a matter of knowing how to get there. The scene also summed up the theme of the season, which was depicting Graham as a victim. He further added, "It all goes back to several scenes in our second episode which involved Will Graham's first therapy sessions with Hannibal Lecter. If you recall, he was up on the second level and it was as if Hannibal was trying to coax a squirrel out of a tree. And in the next scene, you see him getting closer and he's walking around the desk, In the last scene, he finally takes the chair. So if that squirrel metaphor were being drawn to its conclusion, he finally has the squirrel in a cage."

Fuller revealed that Beverly Katz (played by Hettienne Park) was originally going to die in the episode. Her ear would be the one that Will Graham finds at his house. Fuller changed his mind on the choice, as "we can't kill her yet because we haven't done anything with her."

== Reception ==
=== Viewers ===
The episode was watched by 1.98 million viewers, earning a 0.8/2 in the 18-49 rating demographics on the Nielson ratings scale. This means that 0.8 percent of all households with televisions watched the episode, while 2 percent of all households watching television at that time watched it. This was a 6% decrease from the previous episode, which was watched by 2.10 million viewers with a 0.7/2 in the 18-49 demographics. With these ratings, Hannibal ranked third on its timeslot and eighth for the night in the 18-49 demographics, behind an Elementary rerun, Does Someone Have to Go?, Jimmy Kimmel Live: Game Night, a Two and a Half Men rerun, a The Big Bang Theory rerun, Hell's Kitchen, and the seventh game of the 2013 NBA Finals.

=== Critical reviews ===
"Savoureux" received universal acclaim from critics. Eric Goldman of IGN gave the episode an "amazing" 9.5 out of 10 and wrote, "Hannibal's been a truly awesome story to watch unfold this year, taking something so familiar and showing how you can breathe new life into it in the best way possible. I can't wait to see what happens next in Season 2 next year."

Molly Eichel of The A.V. Club gave the episode an "A" and wrote, "Above all, what is really great about this episode is the performances. Each actor expertly conveys the sense of confusion and betrayal upon realizing their colleague, their friend, is the same type of maniac they’re paid to chase." Jeff Jensen of Entertainment Weekly gave the season an "A−" grade, writing "The season finale of Hannibal, Bryan Fuller's sensational reformulation of the Hannibal Lecter fantasy, gave us much to chew on, and I'm not just talking about the suspiciously delicious meal Hannibal prepared for his shrink, Dr. Bedelia Du Maurier."

Alan Sepinwall of HitFix wrote, "Fuller and company did an incredible job of paying off the story of the season, and of inverting the archetypal image of Lecter facing his chief FBI rival." Laura Akers of Den of Geek wrote, "Some of the elk stuff aside early on (though an argument could be made even in defense of that), I'm not sure there has ever been a network television show this tight. While lush in its cinematography (who would have thought murder and cannibalism could look so delicious?), Hannibal is incredibly economical in just about every way imaginable. Scenes, dialogue, fantasy shots… all are only are long as they must be to accomplish their task in this narrative." Kevin Fitzpatrick of ScreenCrush wrote, "A fine finale to be certain for a season of courses each more delectable than the last, albeit one that comes with a rather steep cost that raises more questions than answers over our next meal."

=== Accolades ===
TVLine named Mads Mikkelsen the "Performer of the Week" for the week of June 23, 2013, for his performance in the episode. The site wrote, "Just as Hugh Dancy earned POTW honors with his rendition of a man slowly becoming unraveled, Mikkelsen has regaled viewers with his portrayal of a calculating killer icily in control — until, in a rare, shocking moment of humanity, he wasn't."
