= Steve Lightfoot =

British television writer and producer

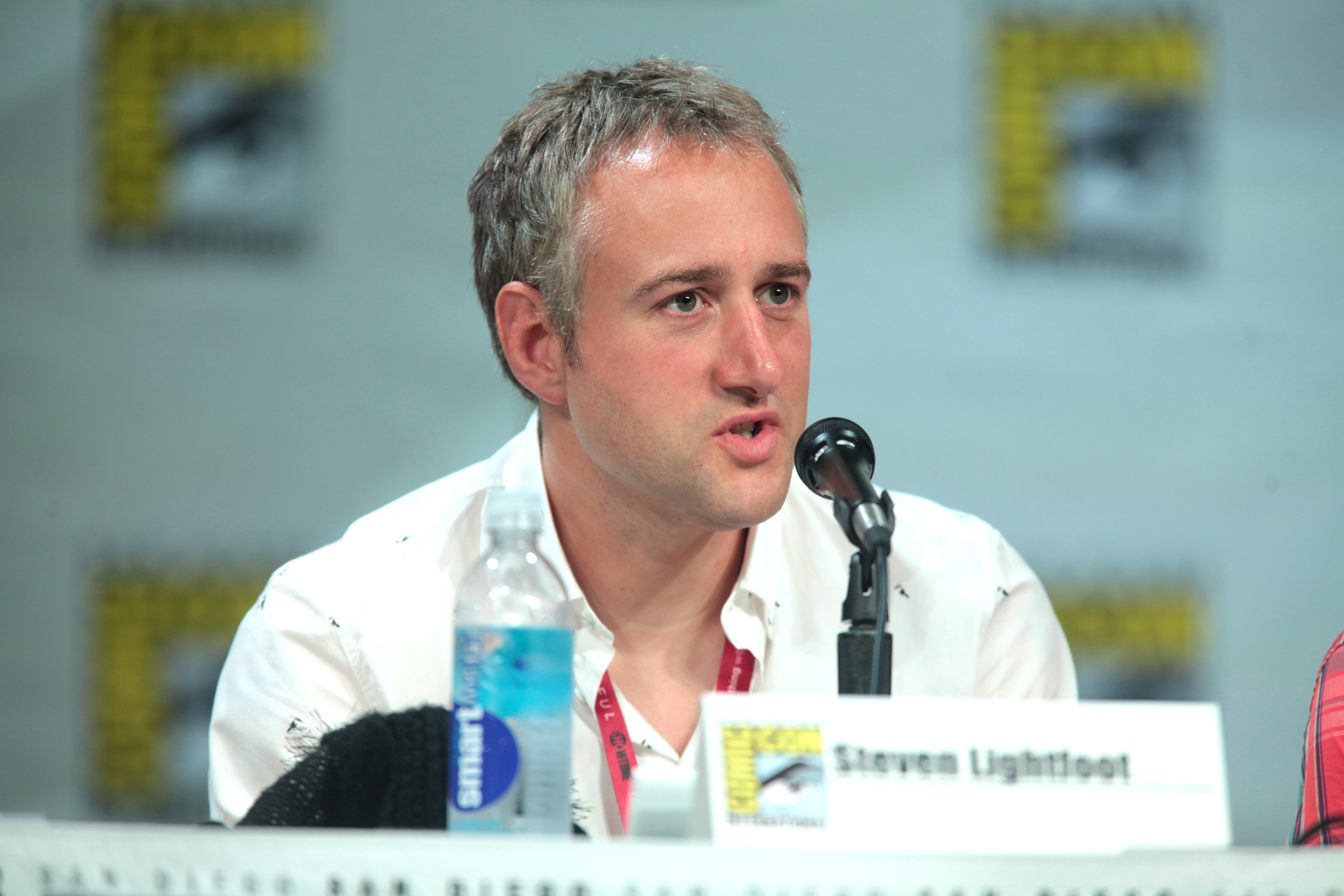
- Lightfoot, 2014 San Diego Comic-Con
- Born: United Kingdom
- Education: University of East Anglia
- Occupations: Television writer, producer, showrunner
- Writing career
- Notable work: Spider-Noir

Steve Lightfoot (sometimes credited as Steven Lightfoot or Robert Scott Fraser) is a British television writer, producer and showrunner who worked on the NBC thriller television series Hannibal, the Netflix series The Punisher, the Netflix thriller miniseries Behind Her Eyes, Shantaram and Spider-Noir.

== Education ==
Lightfoot graduated from the University of East Anglia with an MA in creative writing.

== Television career ==
Since the early 2000s, Lightfoot has worked on a number of television series as a producer and writer, including Casualty, Taggart, House of Saddam, Camelot, Transporter: The Series, Hannibal, and Narcos. He also serves as showrunner for The Punisher. On 25 January 2019 it was announced that Lightfoot would be credited as an executive producer and writer in the Netflix thriller miniseries, Behind Her Eyes.

In 2022, Steve co-created Shantaram for Apple TV+ with Eric Warren Singer which aired from 14 October 2022 and concluded on 16 December 2022. The show was canceled after one season.

Lightfoot worked, along with Oren Uziel, as co-showrunner and executive producer of the television series Spider-Noir, starring Nicolas Cage, a live-action adaptation of the superhero Spider-Man Noir.

=== Filmography ===
==== Casualty ====
- (17.12) "Gimme Shelter"
- (17.16) "Living for the Moment"
- (17.28) "A Hard Day's Night"
- (17.32) "Stuck in the Middle with You"
- (18.10) "Black Dog Day"
- (18.15) "Never Judge a Book"
- (18.17) "I Got it Bad and Ain't That Good"
- (19.37) "Fat Chance" (with Danny McCahon)
- (20.23) "It's a Man Thing" (with Jim Davies)
- (20.29) "Heroes and Villains"
- (20.43) "Needle" (with Danny McCahon)

==== Casualty@Holby City ====
- (1.03) "Something We Can Do"

==== Taggart ====
- (27.02) "Abuse of Trust"

==== Camelot ====
- (1.07) "The Long Night"
- (1.08) "Igraine" (with Chris Chibnall and Louise Fox)

==== Transporter: The Series ====
- (1.02) "Trojan Horsepower"
- (1.11) "Cherchez La Femme"

==== Inspector George Gently ====
- (6.03) "Gently with Honour" (with Jess Williams)

==== Hannibal ====
- (1.09) "Trou Normand"
- (1.11) "Rôti" (with Bryan Fuller and Scott Nimerfro)
- (1.13) "Savoureux" (with Bryan Fuller and Scott Nimerfro)
- (2.01) "Kaiseki" (with Bryan Fuller)
- (2.03) "Hassun" (with Jason Grote)
- (2.05) "Mukōzuke" (with Ayanna A. Floyd and Bryan Fuller)
- (2.06) "Futamono" (with Andy Black, Bryan Fuller and Scott Nimerfro)
- (2.07) "Yakimono" (with Bryan Fuller)
- (2.08) "Su-zakana" (with Bryan Fuller and Scott Nimerfro)
- (2.10) "Naka-choko" (with Kai Yu Wu)
- (2.13) "Mizumono" (with Bryan Fuller)
- (3.01) "Antipasto" (with Bryan Fuller)
- (3.03) "Secondo" (with Angelina Burnett and Bryan Fuller)
- (3.04) "Aperitivo" (with Nick Antosca and Bryan Fuller)
- (3.05) "Contorno" (with Bryan Fuller and Tom de Ville)
- (3.06) "Dolce" (with Bryan Fuller and Don Mancini)
- (3.07) "Digestivo" (with Bryan Fuller)
- (3.08) "The Great Red Dragon" (with Nick Antosca and Bryan Fuller)
- (3.09) "...And the Woman Clothed with the Sun" (with Bryan Fuller, Helen Shang and Jeff Vlaming)
- (3.11) "...And the Beast from the Sea" (with Bryan Fuller)
- (3.12) "The Number of the Beast Is 666" (with Jeff Vlaming, Angela Lamanna, and Bryan Fuller)
- (3.13) "The Wrath of the Lamb" (with Nick Antosca and Bryan Fuller)

==== Narcos ====
- (2.03) "Our Man in Madrid" (with Zachary Reiter)
- (2.04) "The Good, the Bad, and the Dead" (with T.J. Brady, Rasheed Newson, Zachary Reiter, Carlo Barnard, and Doug Miro)

==== The Punisher ====
- (1.01) "3 AM"
- (1.02) "Two Dead Men"
- (1.03) "Kandahar"
- (1.13) "Memento Mori"
- (2.01) "Roadhouse Blues"
- (2.02) "Fight or Flight"
- (2.09) "Flustercluck" (with Ken Kristensen)
- (2.10) "The Dark Hearts of Men" (with Angela LaManna)
- (2.13) "The Whirlwind"

==== Behind Her Eyes ====
- (1.01) "Chance Encounters"
- (1.02) "Lucid Dreaming"
- (1.05) "The Second Door"
- (1.06) "Behind Her Eyes"

==== Shantaram ====
- (1.01) "The Bombay No" (with Eric Warren Singer)
- (1.02) "Down and Out in Bombay" (with Eric Warren Singer)
- (1.03) "Strange Bedfellows" (with David Manson and Eric Warren Singer)
- (1.12) "All the Way From There Just to Get to Here" (with Ken Kristensen)

==== Spider-Noir ====
- (1.03) "Double Cross" (with Megan Liao)
- (1.05) "Betrayal" (with Jennifer Frazin)

== Awards and nominations ==
In 2009, Lightfoot was nominated for a BAFTA Award for producing House of Saddam.
