= Rôti (Hannibal) =

- Hannibal episode
- Episode no.: Season 1 Episode 11
- Directed by: Guillermo Navarro
- Written by: Steve Lightfoot; Bryan Fuller; Scott Nimerfro
- Cinematography by: James Hawkinson
- Editing by: Stephen Philipson
- Production code: 111
- Original air date: June 6, 2013
- Running time: 44 minutes

Guest appearances
- Suzy Eddie Izzard as Dr. Abel Gideon (special guest star); Raúl Esparza as Dr. Frederick Chilton; Scott Thompson as Jimmy Price; Aaron Abrams as Brian Zeller; Lara Jean Chorostecki as Freddie Lounds; Gillian Anderson as Bedelia Du Maurier; Vladimir Cubrt as Garret Jacob Hobbs; Todd Dulmage as Dr. Paul Carruthers; Vincent Rother as PT Officer; Max White as Male Nurse

Episode chronology
← Previous "Buffet Froid"	Next → "Relevés"
- Hannibal season 1

"Rôti" is the eleventh episode of the first season of the psychological thriller–horror series Hannibal. The episode was written by Steve Lightfoot, series creator Bryan Fuller and supervising producer Scott Nimerfro, and directed by Guillermo Navarro. It was first broadcast on June 6, 2013, on NBC.

The series is based on characters and elements appearing in Thomas Harris' novels Red Dragon and Hannibal, with focus on the relationship between FBI special investigator Will Graham (Hugh Dancy) and Dr. Hannibal Lecter (Mads Mikkelsen), a forensic psychiatrist destined to become Graham's most cunning enemy. The episode revolves around Dr. Abel Gideon escaping from custody and targeting those doctors who were treating him. Graham attempts to protect Bloom but his sanity continues deteriorating.

According to Nielsen Media Research, the episode was seen by an estimated 2.36 million household viewers and gained a 0.9/3 ratings share among adults aged 18–49. The episode received critical acclaim, with critics praising Navarro's directing, writing, shock value, performances (particularly Izzard and Dancy), and character development.

== Plot ==
Over dinner, Chilton (Raúl Esparza) shares his concerns to Lecter (Mads Mikkelsen) that Abel Gideon (Eddie Izzard) is accusing him of motivating Gideon to kill, which could damage Chilton's career. The next day, during a prison transfer, Gideon manages to escape custody. Elsewhere, the BAU team find corpses and organs hanging from trees. Graham (Hugh Dancy) notes that the Chesapeake Ripper wouldn't display his victims like this and concludes that he is trying to get the Ripper's attention. As Gideon is heading back to Baltimore, Graham and Bloom (Caroline Dhavernas) question Chilton, who may be in danger. Chilton states Gideon wants to prove that he is the Ripper. At a session with Lecter, Graham feels he is going insane as he imagines rooms are now filled with antlers. His undiagnosed encephalitis drives his temperature up, causing severe hallucinations.

The BAU conclude that Gideon is targeting the psychiatrists who attempted to treat him; Graham fears that Bloom might be next. Meanwhile, Lounds (Lara Jean Chorostecki) is contacted by a doctor for a possible collaboration in an article. When she arrives at his office, she finds Gideon, who has killed the doctor and displayed his tongue like a Colombian necktie. The BAU finds that Gideon drained his blood because the doctor wrote an article which negatively depicted Gideon. They also find that TattleCrime.com posted an article that has revealed the return of the Ripper. Gideon has taken Lounds as a hostage and brought her to the old observatory, where he hopes the articles will motivate the Ripper to reveal himself. He has also kidnapped Chilton and removes his organs during a surgery, intending to leave it as a "gift basket" for the Ripper.

Another psychiatrist is found similarly mutilated, with his right arm amputated. Graham speculates that this is actually a message from the real Ripper telling them where to find Gideon. They head to the observatory, as that is where Crawford (Laurence Fishburne) found Miriam Lass's severed arm. Crawford and a SWAT team enter, finding Chilton holding his organs while Lounds pumps air on his mouth, but Gideon has escaped. As the raid unfolds, Graham's hallucination of the stag returns and he follows it, fortuitously intercepting Gideon, although Graham views Gideon as Garret Jacob Hobbs.

In his delusional state, Graham takes Gideon to Lecter, who convinces Graham that he has hallucinated the encounter. When Graham has a seizure, Lecter uses the opportunity to set Gideon on Bloom. Lecter manipulates Graham into pursuing him, leaving a gun and keys so Graham can arrive at her house. Graham catches up with Gideon outside, where he expresses concern over his real identity. Graham shoots Gideon and collapses. Crawford tells Lecter that Chilton will be hospitalized while Graham will be fine, although Lecter recommends removing his gun for his safety. At a session with Bedelia (Gillian Anderson), Lecter is told he must restrain himself from getting too involved with Graham if he really wants to help him as a psychiatrist.

== Production ==
=== Development ===
In May 2013, it was announced that the eleventh episode of the series would be titled "Rôti", and was directed by Guillermo Navarro and written by Steve Lightfoot, series creator Bryan Fuller, and supervising producer Scott Nimerfro. This was Fuller's 8th writing credit, Lightfoot's second writing credit, Nimerfro's second writing credit and Navarro's third directing credit.

=== Writing ===
Bryan Fuller commented on the visual style of the episode, "the visual aspect of pure empathy hinges on seeing Will Graham commit these crimes. So when he's empathizing with the worst of us, you have to see him behaving like the worst of us."

== Reception ==
=== Viewers ===
The episode was watched by 2.36 million viewers, earning a 0.9/3 in the 18–49 rating demographics on the Nielson ratings scale. This means that 0.9 percent of all households with televisions watched the episode, while 3 percent of all households watching television at that time watched it. This was a slight decrease from the previous episode, which was watched by 2.40 million viewers with a 1.0/3 in the 18–49 demographics. With these ratings, Hannibal ranked third on its timeslot and eighth for the night in the 18–49 demographics, behind an Elementary rerun, a Person of Interest rerun, Does Someone Have to Go?, Jimmy Kimmel Live: Game Night, Hell's Kitchen, a The Big Bang Theory rerun, and the first game of the 2013 NBA Finals.

=== Critical reviews ===
"Rôti" received critical acclaim. Eric Goldman of IGN gave the episode an "amazing" 9.5 out of 10 and wrote, "First off, let's just get out of the way... That dude's tongue was pulled through his throat!!!! At this point, Hannibal is basically laughing in the face of anyone who dared say it would be held back, content-wise, on NBC. It's sick and twisted in all the right ways and the most creatively gory show I've ever seen on network TV."

Molly Eichel of The A.V. Club gave the episode an "A−" and wrote, "Hannibal's strengths have always come from the smaller scenes, between two or three actors (such as the aforementioned scene between Hannibal and Jack). 'Rôti' showed that quality off masterfully."

Laura Akers of Den of Geek wrote, "Of course, the vast majority of mental health professionals are extremely ethical in their work. But much of the horror of the Hannibal stories comes from exploring the basic question of what happens when the person we trust with our mental health is both psychopathic and sociopathic. And that theme runs particularly heavily in this episode. It is also one whose fullness is only apparent in light of the rest of Harris' canon." Kevin Fitzpatrick of ScreenCrush wrote, "Eddie Izzard's return provides some welcome continuity relief from the artful serial killers of the week, and affords some excellent opportunity for Hugh Dancy to deliver Emmy-caliber performances of Will's encroaching madness. There isn't much genuine suspense over the course of the hour, given our familiarity with the characters likely to survive, but Hannibal continues to craft its own unique world full of compelling characters we'd gladly watch read the phone book in anticipation of the more recognizable tales."
