= Scott Nimerfro =

American writer and producer (1961–2016)

- Born: July 12, 1961; Richfield, Minnesota, U.S.
- Died: April 17, 2016 (aged 54); Minneapolis, Minnesota, U.S.
- Occupations: Writer; producer
- Writing career
- Language: English
- Notable works: Pushing Daisies, Hannibal, Ringer

Scott Nimerfro (July 12, 1961 – April 17, 2016) was an American writer and producer, best known for the television series Pushing Daisies, Hannibal and for serving as an associate producer on Bryan Singer's 2000 film X-Men.

== Television work ==
=== Episodes of Pushing Daisies ===
- "Smell of Success" (1.07)
- "The Norwegians" (2.10)

=== Episodes of Ringer ===
- "What We Have Is Worth the Pain" (1.17)
- "It's Called Improvising, Bitch!" (1.21)

=== Episodes of Hannibal ===
- "Coquilles" (1.06) (with Bryan Fuller)
- "Rôti" (1.11) (with Steve Lightfoot and Bryan Fuller)
- "Savoureux" (1.13) (with Steve Lightfoot and Bryan Fuller)
- "Takiawase" (2.04) (with Bryan Fuller)
- "Su-zakana" (2.08)

=== Episodes of Once Upon A Time ===
- "Breaking Glass" (4.05) (with Kalinda Vazquez)
- "Shattered Sight" (4.10) (with Tze Chun)
- "Heart of Gold" (4.18) (with Tze Chun)

== Awards and nominations ==
In 2008, Nimerfro was nominated for a Writers Guild of America award for his work on Pushing Daisies.

== Death ==
Nimerfro died on April 17, 2016, aged 54 after a year-long battle with angiosarcoma.

The Once Upon a Time episode "Sisters" is dedicated to his memory. In the Star Trek: Strange New Worlds episode "Subspace Rhapsody", Nyota Uhura has a communication with the 'U.S.S. Nimerfro,' possibly in reference to him.
