= Michael Rymer =

Australian television and film director

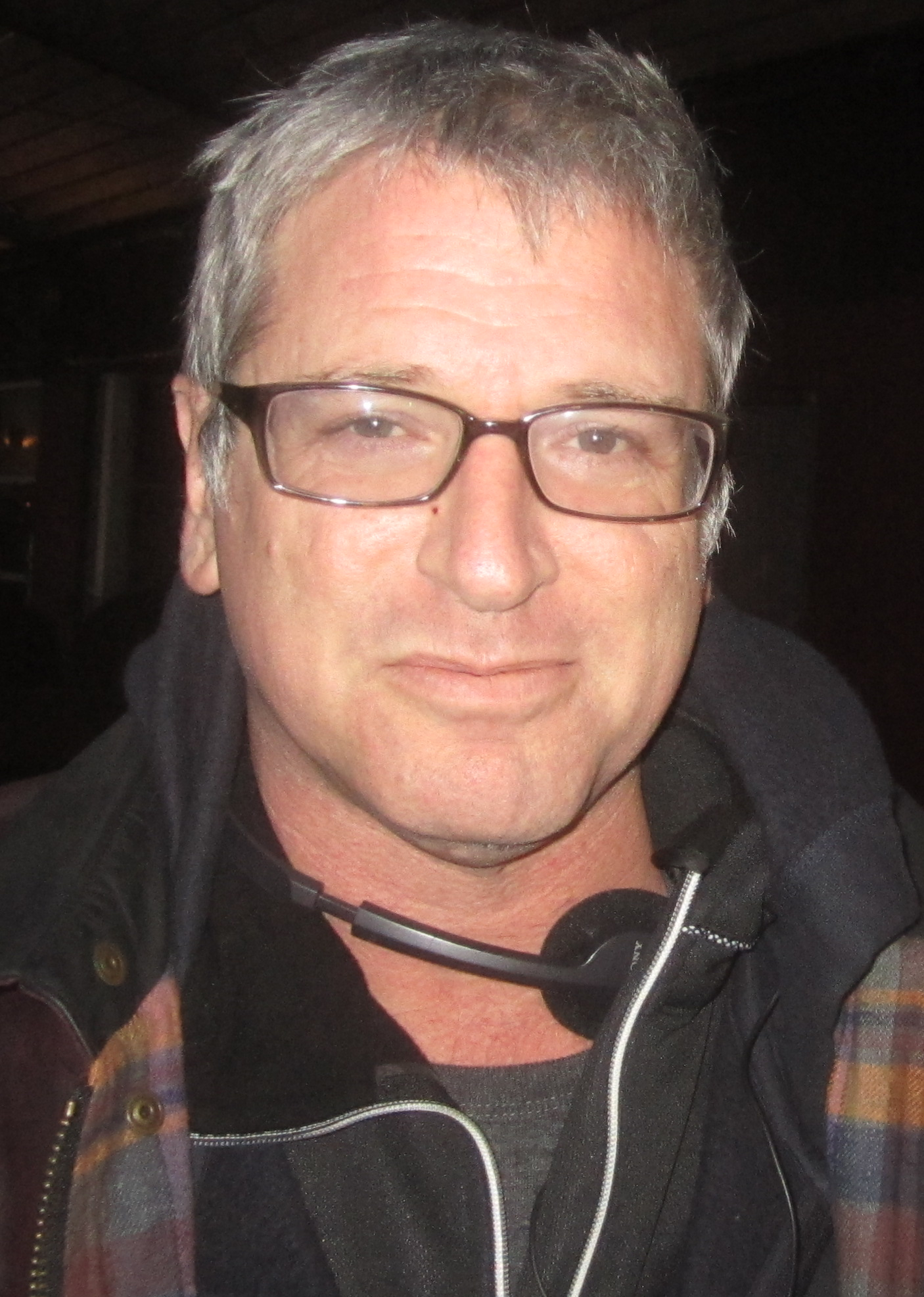
Rymer in 2011

Michael Rymer (born 1 March 1963 in Melbourne) is an Australian television and film director, best known for his work on the re-imagined Battlestar Galactica TV series, for which he directed the pilot miniseries and several episodes of the series. He also directed In Too Deep and Queen of the Damned.

Rymer attended film school at the University of Southern California.

== Filmography ==
- Dead Sleep (1990)
- Angel Baby (1995)
- Allie & Me (1997)
- In Too Deep (1999)
- Perfume (2001)
- Queen of the Damned (2002)
- Battlestar Galactica (2003)
- Battlestar Galactica (2004–2009)
- Revolution (2009)
- Face to Face (2011)
- American Horror Story: Asylum (2012)
- Hannibal (2013–2015)
- Deadline Gallipoli (2015)
- The Man in the High Castle (2015)
- Jessica Jones (2015)
- Picnic at Hanging Rock (2018) (2 episodes)
- The Gloaming (TV series)

== Awards ==
Rymer's directorial debut, Angel Baby, won seven Australian Film Institute (AFI) Awards in 1995, including Best Director and Best Screenplay (Original) for Rymer himself.

Rymer won the award of Best Dramatic Feature at the 2012 Byron Bay International Film Festival for the film Face to Face, and the Hugo Award for Best Dramatic Presentation, Short Form for the Jessica Jones episode "AKA Smile" in 2016. The 2003 Battlestar Galactica miniseries, which he directed, won the Saturn Award for Best Television Presentation in 2004.
