= List of Hannibal episodes =

Hannibal is an American psychological thriller television series developed by Bryan Fuller for NBC that aired for 39 episodes from April 4, 2013, until August 29, 2015.

The series is based upon characters and elements appearing in the novels Red Dragon (1981), Hannibal (1999), and Hannibal Rising (2006) by Thomas Harris. The series focuses on the budding relationship between FBI Special Agent Will Graham (Hugh Dancy), a crime scene investigator who holds the ability to empathize with psychopaths and murderers, and Dr. Hannibal Lecter (Mads Mikkelsen), a forensic psychiatrist and secret cannibal destined to become Graham's most cunning enemy. The FBI staff that supports Graham is headed by Special Agent in Charge Jack Crawford (Laurence Fishburne), who takes Graham from his teaching job to help investigate only the most gruesome and bizarre of murders, and includes a forensic team consisting of Beverly Katz (Hettienne Park), Brian Zeller (Aaron Abrams) and Jimmy Price (Scott Thompson). While Dr. Alana Bloom (Caroline Dhavernas) inadvertently slips deeper into Hannibal's world, clinical psychiatrist Dr. Bedelia Du Maurier (Gillian Anderson) does so purposefully, as does crime blogger Fredricka "Freddie" Lounds (Lara Jean Chorostecki), who frequently attempts to use Graham, Lecter, and their cases to make a name for herself.

Each episode of the first season is named after an element of French cuisine. The season two titles are named after the different elements of Japanese haute cuisine. The first seven of season three's episodes are named after different courses of Italian cuisine, the subsequent five are named for William Blake's series of The Great Red Dragon Paintings, and the finale's title is a phrase from Revelation 6:16.

== Series overview ==
Season	Episodes	Originally released	
Season	Episodes	First released	Last released
1	13	April 4, 2013	June 20, 2013
2	13	February 28, 2014	May 23, 2014
3	13	June 4, 2015	August 27, 2015 (Canada); August 29, 2015 (U.S.)

== Episodes ==
=== Season 1 (2013) ===
No. overall	No. in season	Title	Directed by	Written by	Original release date	Prod. code	U.S. viewers (millions)
1	1	"Apéritif"	David Slade	Bryan Fuller	April 4, 2013	101	4.36
2	2	"Amuse-Bouche"	Michael Rymer	Jim Danger Gray	April 11, 2013	102	4.38
3	3	"Potage"	David Slade	Story by : David Fury; Teleplay by : David Fury and Chris Brancato and Bryan Fuller	April 18, 2013	105	3.51
4	4	"Oeuf"	Peter Medak	Jennifer Schuur	April 26, 2013 (India); Unaired (U.S.)	104	N/A
5	5	"Coquilles"	Guillermo Navarro	Story by : Scott Nimerfro; Teleplay by : Scott Nimerfro and Bryan Fuller	April 25, 2013	106	2.40
6	6	"Entrée"	Michael Rymer	Story by : Kai Yu Wu; Teleplay by : Kai Yu Wu and Bryan Fuller	May 2, 2013	107	2.61
7	7	"Sorbet"	James Foley	Jesse Alexander & Bryan Fuller	May 9, 2013	103	2.62
8	8	"Fromage"	Tim Hunter	Jennifer Schuur and Bryan Fuller	May 16, 2013	108	2.46
9	9	"Trou Normand"	Guillermo Navarro	Steve Lightfoot	May 23, 2013	109	2.69
10	10	"Buffet Froid"	John Dahl	Andy Black & Chris Brancato and Bryan Fuller	May 30, 2013	110	2.40
11	11	"Rôti"	Guillermo Navarro	Steve Lightfoot and Bryan Fuller & Scott Nimerfro	June 6, 2013	111	2.36
12	12	"Relevés"	Michael Rymer	Chris Brancato and Bryan Fuller	June 13, 2013	112	2.10
13	13	"Savoureux"	David Slade	Steve Lightfoot and Bryan Fuller & Scott Nimerfro	June 20, 2013	113	1.98

=== Season 2 (2014) ===
No. overall	No. in season	Title	Directed by	Written by	Original release date	Prod. code	U.S. viewers (millions)
14	1	"Kaiseki"	Tim Hunter	Bryan Fuller & Steve Lightfoot	February 28, 2014	201	3.27
15	2	"Sakizuke"	Tim Hunter	Jeff Vlaming and Bryan Fuller	March 7, 2014	202	2.50
16	3	"Hassun"	Peter Medak	Jason Grote and Steve Lightfoot	March 14, 2014	203	2.47
17	4	"Takiawase"	David Semel	Scott Nimerfro & Bryan Fuller	March 21, 2014	204	2.69
18	5	"Mukōzuke"	Michael Rymer	Ayanna A. Floyd and Steve Lightfoot & Bryan Fuller	March 28, 2014	205	3.49
19	6	"Futamono"	Tim Hunter	Story by : Andy Black; Teleplay by : Andy Black and Bryan Fuller & Scott Nimerfro & Steve Lightfoot	April 4, 2014	206	2.18
20	7	"Yakimono"	Michael Rymer	Steve Lightfoot and Bryan Fuller	April 11, 2014	207	2.25
21	8	"Su-zakana"	Vincenzo Natali	Scott Nimerfro and Bryan Fuller & Steve Lightfoot	April 18, 2014	208	2.80
22	9	"Shiizakana"	Michael Rymer	Jeff Vlaming and Bryan Fuller	April 25, 2014	209	2.45
23	10	"Naka-choko"	Vincenzo Natali	Story by : Steve Lightfoot and Kai Yu Wu; Teleplay by : Steve Lightfoot	May 2, 2014	210	2.28
24	11	"Kō No Mono"	David Slade	Jeff Vlaming & Andy Black and Bryan Fuller	May 9, 2014	211	1.95
25	12	"Tome-wan"	Michael Rymer	Chris Brancato and Bryan Fuller & Scott Nimerfro	May 16, 2014	212	2.32
26	13	"Mizumono"	David Slade	Steve Lightfoot and Bryan Fuller	May 23, 2014	213	2.35

=== Season 3 (2015) ===
No. overall	No. in season	Title	Directed by	Written by	Original release date	Prod. code	U.S. viewers (millions)
27	1	"Antipasto"	Vincenzo Natali	Bryan Fuller & Steve Lightfoot	June 4, 2015	301	2.57
28	2	"Primavera"	Vincenzo Natali	Jeff Vlaming and Bryan Fuller	June 11, 2015	302	1.66
29	3	"Secondo"	Vincenzo Natali	Angelina Burnett and Bryan Fuller & Steve Lightfoot	June 18, 2015	303	1.69
30	4	"Aperitivo"	Marc Jobst	Nick Antosca and Bryan Fuller & Steve Lightfoot	June 25, 2015	304	1.46
31	5	"Contorno"	Guillermo Navarro	Tom de Ville and Bryan Fuller & Steve Lightfoot	July 2, 2015	305	1.23
32	6	"Dolce"	Vincenzo Natali	Don Mancini and Bryan Fuller & Steve Lightfoot	July 9, 2015	306	1.38
33	7	"Digestivo"	Adam Kane	Steve Lightfoot and Bryan Fuller	July 16, 2015 (Canada); July 18, 2015 (U.S.)	307	0.97
34	8	"The Great Red Dragon"	Neil Marshall	Nick Antosca & Steve Lightfoot and Bryan Fuller	July 23, 2015 (Canada); July 25, 2015 (U.S.)	308	0.96
35	9	"...And the Woman Clothed with the Sun"	John Dahl	Jeff Vlaming & Helen Shang and Bryan Fuller & Steve Lightfoot	July 30, 2015 (Canada); August 1, 2015 (U.S.)	309	1.02
36	10	"...And the Woman Clothed in Sun"	Guillermo Navarro	Don Mancini and Bryan Fuller	August 6, 2015 (Canada); August 8, 2015 (U.S.)	310	1.01
37	11	"...And the Beast from the Sea"	Michael Rymer	Steve Lightfoot and Bryan Fuller	August 13, 2015 (Canada); August 15, 2015 (U.S.)	311	1.03
38	12	"The Number of the Beast Is 666"	Guillermo Navarro	Jeff Vlaming & Angela Lamanna and Bryan Fuller & Steve Lightfoot	August 20, 2015 (Canada); August 22, 2015 (U.S.)	312	0.79
39	13	"The Wrath of the Lamb"	Michael Rymer	Bryan Fuller & Steve Lightfoot & Nick Antosca	August 27, 2015 (Canada); August 29, 2015 (U.S.)	313	1.24

== Ratings ==
Hannibal (TV series) : U.S. viewers per episode (millions)

Season	Episode number													Average
Season	1	2	3	4	5	6	7	8	9	10	11	12	13	Average
1	4.36	4.38	3.51	N/A	2.40	2.61	2.62	2.46	2.69	2.40	2.36	2.10	1.98	2.90
2	3.27	2.50	2.47	2.69	3.49	2.18	2.25	2.80	2.45	2.28	1.95	2.32	2.35	2.54
3	2.57	1.66	1.69	1.46	1.23	1.38	0.97	0.96	1.02	1.01	1.03	0.79	1.24	1.31

Audience measurement performed by Nielsen Media Research
