= The Number of the Beast Is 666 =

- Hannibal episode
- Episode no.: Season 3 Episode 12
- Directed by: Guillermo Navarro
- Written by: Jeff Vlaming; Angela Lamanna; Bryan Fuller; Steve Lightfoot
- Cinematography by: James Hawkinson
- Editing by: Stephen Philipson
- Production code: 312
- Original air dates: August 20, 2015 (Canada); August 22, 2015 (U.S.)
- Running time: 44 minutes

Guest appearances
- Richard Armitage as Francis Dolarhyde; Rutina Wesley as Reba McClane; Nina Arianda as Molly Graham; Raúl Esparza as Dr. Frederick Chilton; Lara Jean Chorostecki as Freddie Lounds

Episode chronology
← Previous "...And the Beast from the Sea"	Next → "The Wrath of the Lamb"
- Hannibal season 3

"The Number of the Beast Is 666" is the twelfth episode of the third season of the psychological thriller–horror series Hannibal. It is the 38th overall episode of the series and was written by co-executive producer Jeff Vlaming, Angela Lamanna, series creator Bryan Fuller, and executive producer Steve Lightfoot, and directed by Guillermo Navarro. It was first broadcast on August 20, 2015, on Canada, and then August 22, 2015 on NBC.

The series is based on characters and elements appearing in Thomas Harris' novels Red Dragon and Hannibal, with focus on the relationship between FBI special investigator Will Graham (Hugh Dancy) and Dr. Hannibal Lecter (Mads Mikkelsen), a forensic psychiatrist destined to become Graham's most cunning enemy. The episode revolves around the hunt for "The Tooth Fairy". In order to attract their attention, Will Graham and Dr. Frederick Chilton conduct an interview to make crude remarks about the killer, with Graham anticipating him. However, things take a bad turn when Chilton is the one kidnapped.

According to Nielsen Media Research, the episode was seen by an estimated 0.79 million household viewers and gained a 0.2/1 ratings share among adults aged 18–49, making it the series' lowest watched episode. The episode received critical acclaim, with critics praising the performances (particularly Richard Armitage and Raúl Esparza), character development, directing and the episode's surprisingly dark humor.

== Plot ==
Graham has a therapy session with Bedelia Du Maurier (Gillian Anderson), explaining that he is starting to imagine himself committing the murders by "The Tooth Fairy". Bedelia states that Lecter (Mads Mikkelsen) planned for Graham to have a family so he could it take away from him, even noting that she herself will be eaten someday by Lecter. Graham wonders if Lecter is in love with him, and Bedelia confirms it and asks if he also has feelings for Lecter. He does not respond.

Lecter talks with Crawford (Laurence Fishburne), deeming Graham the "Lamb of God" and saying that his "wrath" should be of concern to them. Crawford later meets with Graham and Bloom (Caroline Dhavernas) to work on a plan to find "The Tooth Fairy". Graham wants to arrange a meeting with Freddie Lounds (Lara Jean Chorostecki), where he will provoke the killer out of hiding by talking badly about him, but they feel he needs someone with him. During this, Dr. Chilton (Raúl Esparza) meets with Lecter to call him out for sending refuted claims about Chilton to The American Journal of Psychiatry.

The team uses Graham and Chilton for an interview with Lounds, where they claim that "The Tooth Fairy" is a "vicious, perverted, sexual failure" and a product of incest. They then take a photograph of them, and Lounds publishes their insulting remarks. Dolarhyde (Richard Armitage) reads the interview and is angry. However, instead of kidnapping Graham, he actually kidnaps Chilton and takes him to his house. Dolarhyde glues a naked Chilton to a chair, where Chilton feels he is being "burned". Dolarhyde, wearing a mask, starts taunting a frightened Chilton.

Suddenly, Reba (Rutina Wesley) visits Dolarhyde's house, thinking he was sick. She enters the house, unaware that Chilton is there. They have a brief conversation, where she refers to him as "D" and leaves. Dolarhyde then shows Chilton some slides, showing The Great Red Dragon paintings as well as his victims, one of which includes a photograph of Chilton and Graham. Chilton starts panicking, claiming everything he said was false. Dolarhyde shows his Red Dragon tattoo and proclaims he will have to refute his claims. He records Chilton admitting that his claims were false, intending to allow him to go. However, Dolarhyde states he will now understand his pain, revealing his abnormally sharp teeth and bites Chilton's lips, ripping them off of his face.

Dolarhyde sends the lips to Lecter with a note that reads "With these he offended me". When Crawford arrives, he finds that only one lip remains, as Lecter ate the other one. Bloom blames Lecter for discrediting Chilton, but he blames her for letting him participate in the plan and putting him at risk. The team later watches Chilton's tape, in which he blames everything on Graham, before seeing Dolarhyde bite his lips. Graham has another session with Bedelia, who notes that in the interview's photograph, Graham placed his hand on Chilton's shoulder. Bedelia deduces that he expected Dolarhyde to go after Chilton as he feels influenced by Lecter's "participation".

Dolarhyde places Chilton in a wheelchair and then burns him alive. At the hospital, Graham and Crawford visit Chilton, who is still alive despite his severe injuries. Chilton calls out Graham, blaming him for having put his hand on his shoulder and "set him up". Nevertheless, Chilton says he saw a Black blind woman with Dolarhyde. Dolarhyde kidnaps Reba and takes her to his house, where he reveals the crimes he committed. He proclaims that he is becoming "The Dragon", as he imagines himself having wings.

== Production ==
=== Development ===
In April 2015, Guillermo Navarro announced that he would direct the twelfth episode of the season. In July 2015, NBC announced that the twelfth episode of the season would be titled "The Number of the Beast Is 666", with co-executive producer Jeff Vlaming, Angela Lamanna, series creator Bryan Fuller, and executive producer Steve Lightfoot writing the episode and Navarro directing. This was Fuller's 32nd writing credit, Vlaming's 6th writing credit, Lamanna's first writing credit, Lightfoot's 20th writing credit, and Navarro's sixth directing credit.

== Reception ==
=== Viewers ===
The episode was watched by 0.79 million viewers, earning a 0.2/1 in the 18–49 rating demographics on the Nielson ratings scale. This means that 0.2 percent of all households with televisions watched the episode, while 1 percent of all households watching television at that time watched it. This was a 24% decrease from the previous episode, which was watched by 1.03 million viewers with a 0.3/1 in the 18-49 demographics. With these ratings, Hannibal ranked third on its timeslot and tenth for the night in the 18-49 demographics, behind a Bullseye rerun, a Home Free rerun, a Running Wild with Bear Grylls rerun, a Beyond the Tank rerun, a Scorpion rerun, a America's Funniest Home Videos rerun, Boston EMS, and two 48 Hours episodes.

With DVR factored, the episode was watched with a 0.3 on the 18–49 demo.

=== Critical reviews ===
"The Number of the Beast Is 666" received critical acclaim. Eric Goldman of IGN gave the episode an "amazing" 9.5 out of 10 and wrote in his verdict: "My biggest anxiety is that a ton is in play here, from the Red Dragon storyline to Hannibal and Will's dynamic, with just one episode left that now bears the weight of being The End – and set up a future we may never see. But this episode once again showed just how dynamic and thrilling Hannibal can be, so let's just all try and treasure next week's finale and the end of one hell of a TV show, shall we?"

Molly Eichel of The A.V. Club gave the episode an "A−" and wrote, "While Francis Dolarhyde becomes, Will Graham actively works against these evil impulses. Yet, 'The Number Of The Beast Is 666' proved that try as Will might, he has already become what he does not want to be."

Alan Sepinwall of HitFix wrote, "This won't end well for many of the characters involved, but I have high hopes for the end of (this phase of) the series." Mark Rozeman of Paste gave the episode a 9.7 out of 10 and wrote, "'The Number of the Beast is 666' is an episode that simmers intensely for two thirds of its running time before, quite literally, exploding into flames in its last stretch." Becca Nadler of IndieWire gave the episode an "A" and wrote, "Unsurprisingly, Will isn't taking the attack on his family particularly well. Our favorite investigator spends this episode plagued by hallucinations of the women in his life as Dolarhyde's victims."

Brian Moylan of The Guardian wrote, "We know that Hannibal remains in prison, but is there a way for him to still win? Is it possible for Will to draw himself away and still remain psychologically intact? These are the real answers I want, and I don't want the solutions to pop out of nowhere, as this week's seemed to." Keith Staskiewicz of Entertainment Weekly wrote, "Chilton manages to tell Will and Jack that he saw a blind, black woman named Reba at his house. The Dragon must realize this as well, because he kidnaps Reba, ties her up, and finally reveals to her his true form. Now we just wait for the endgame." Chuck Bowen of Slant Magazine wrote, "'The Number of the Beast Is 666' finds Will and Jack turning desperate as Francis remains at large, with their only pipeline to the killer embodied by an increasingly contemptuous, puckish Hannibal. Said desperation is predominantly embodied by three conversations, duets as always, that serve to heavily foreshadow whatever awaits us next week in Hannibal's season, perhaps series, finale."

Greg Cwik of Vulture gave the episode a perfect 5 star rating out of 5 and wrote, "Despite the pensive, melancholic tone of the cold opening, this is one of the funniest episodes of the series. It's also one of the most disturbing." Kayti Burt of Den of Geek gave the episode a 4.5 star rating out of 5 and wrote, "In one of the more meta lines of the episode and show, Hannibal tells Chilton: 'Fate has a habit of not letting us choose our own endings'. That hasn't often been true for Hannibal, and we have a feeling it isn't true for Hannibal, either. Here's hoping for an ending worthy of this amazing, weird, gory, unique, and beautiful show." Robin Harry of TV Fanatic gave the episode a 4.5 star rating out of 5 and wrote, "Remember that crate of Emmys I was talking about? This week, we needed another full crate for Raúl Esparza, who was beyond incredible as Frederick Chilton found himself in a... well... sticky situation."

Emma Dibdin of Digital Spy wrote, "The homoerotic undercurrent to Will and Hannibal's relationship has never exactly gone unspoken. There have been more-than-subtextual references to more-than-friendship between them all along, but it's still startling to have it spelled out so fully in the opening moments of 'The Number of the Beast is 666', where the Brides of Hannibal get into some real talk." Adam Lehrer of Forbes wrote, "With only one episode left, 'The Number of the Beast is 666' finds Hannibal the series asking itself what are its primary motives and themes? Striking religious imagery permeates the episode. Hannibal tells Jack that he is Will's devil, and that Jack is his god. Dolarhye thinks that he's becoming a god. The episode brings the debate of good and evil to the forefront. Hannibal tells Jack that he and Will are bonded by their righteousness. But at the same time, it's Hannibal conscience that is clear. Good and evil only exist inside of the brain that ponders them." Britt Hayes of ScreenCrush wrote, "Mads Mikkelsen is having the absolute best time of his life relishing his role as Hannibal Lecter with devilish smirks and arrogant monologues. His performance is utterly delightful, and it's difficult not to at least crack a smile."
