= ...And the Woman Clothed with the Sun =

- Hannibal episode
- Episode no.: Season 3 Episode 9
- Directed by: John Dahl
- Written by: Jeff Vlaming; Helen Shang; Bryan Fuller; Steve Lightfoot
- Cinematography by: James Hawkinson
- Editing by: Stephen Philipson
- Production code: 309
- Original air dates: July 30, 2015 (Canada); August 1, 2015 (U.S.)
- Running time: 44 minutes

Guest appearances
- Richard Armitage as Francis Dolarhyde; Rutina Wesley as Reba McClane; Nina Arianda as Molly Graham; Lara Jean Chorostecki as Freddie Lounds; Kacey Rohl as Abigail Hobbs; Vladimir Jon Cubrt as Garret Jacob Hobbs; Cheryl Poirier as Mrs. Jacobi; Jerry Getty as Mr. Jacobi; Nicky Cappella as Jacobi Boy; Saige Aurora as Jacobi Girl; Trudy Weiss as Grandmother Dolarhyde; Alana Bridgewater as Orderly; Margaret Kellins as Elderly Patient #1; Howard Swinson as Elderly Patient #2; Devan Cohen as Young Dolarhyde

Episode chronology
← Previous "The Great Red Dragon"	Next → "...And the Woman Clothed in Sun"
- Hannibal season 3

"...And the Woman Clothed with the Sun" is the ninth episode of the third season of the psychological thriller–horror series Hannibal. It is the 35th overall episode of the series and was written by co-executive producer Jeff Vlaming, Helen Shang, series creator Bryan Fuller, and executive producer Steve Lightfoot and directed by John Dahl. It was first broadcast on July 30, 2015, on Canada, and then August 1, 2015 on NBC.

The series is based on characters and elements appearing in Thomas Harris' novels Red Dragon and Hannibal, with focus on the relationship between FBI special investigator Will Graham (Hugh Dancy) and Dr. Hannibal Lecter (Mads Mikkelsen), a forensic psychiatrist destined to become Graham's most cunning enemy. The episode revolves around Will Graham asking Hannibal Lecter for help while investigating "The Tooth Fairy", a serial killer. The killer, a man named Francis Dolarhyde, is living a lonely life but feels a new meaning when he meets a co-worker, Reba McClane.

According to Nielsen Media Research, the episode was seen by an estimated 1.02 million household viewers and gained a 0.3/1 ratings share among adults aged 18–49. The episode received very positive reviews from critics, who praised the writing, performances (particularly Richard Armitage) and Dolarhyde's character development.

== Plot ==
=== Flashbacks ===
On the day he revealed his nature, Lecter (Mads Mikkelsen) comforts Abigail Hobbs (Kacey Rohl) and removes some of her blood. He then uses a compressor spray to spill her blood in the house, making it appear that she died.

In another flashback, Lecter has a session with Abigail, using her father's corpse as a tool. Lecter claims that his father wanted to express when he slit her throat and she should do the same for him. Abigail then slits her father's throat, impressing Lecter.

On the night of the massacre at Lecter's house, Lecter receives Graham's (Hugh Dancy) warning. Lecter informs Abigail that they are waiting for Graham to arrive, although Abigail worries that they will be arrested. Lecter says they must protect each other, as she will "hunt" with him.

=== Present day ===
Graham visits Lecter for the first time in three years. Even though Graham does not want any more association with him, he wants his help in finding the "Tooth Fairy" serial killer, which he accepts.

Graham talks with Bloom (Caroline Dhavernas), who reveals that she is living with Margot Verger and they have a male child together, who will be the heir to Verger's fortune. Getting access to previous cases, Lecter deduces that the "Tooth Fairy" kills the families based on their lives and that he prefers to kill naked in order to "clean" himself with the new moon. Bloom later visits Lecter, warning him not to plan anything suspicious or she will revoke many of his privileges. After remembering a childhood moment, Francis Dolarhyde (Richard Armitage) starts hallucinating that he now has a dragon tail.

Graham visits one of the houses where the "Tooth Fairy" committed murders, finding a Mahjong symbol for "red dragon" carved in a tree. He finds Freddie Lounds (Lara Jean Chorostecki), and he reprimands her for using photos of him without authorization and for suggesting that Graham and Lecter conspired in killing and fleeing. Lounds publishes the meeting between Lecter and Graham, and Dolarhyde reads the article. He later goes to a film developing lab to talk with a blind employee, Reba McClane (Rutina Wesley), and ask for a film. He decides to drive her home, where she asks him to let her touch his face, but Dolarhyde declines.

Graham starts having nightmares where he views himself as the "Tooth Fairy". Crawford (Laurence Fishburne) visits Lecter at his cell to discuss Graham's case, and Lecter expresses his displeasure with Crawford letting Graham work on the case. Later, Lecter receives a call from his "attorney", but it is actually Dolarhyde. He says that he feels delighted that Lecter took an interest in him and that the only important thing is what he is becoming. When Lecter asks what he is becoming, Dolarhyde replies "The Great Red Dragon".

== Production ==
=== Development ===
In July 2015, NBC announced that the ninth episode of the season would be titled "...And the Woman Clothed with the Sun", with co-executive producer Jeff Vlaming, Helen Shang, series creator Bryan Fuller, and executive producer Steve Lightfoot writing the episode and John Dahl directing. This was Fuller's 29th writing credit, Lightfoot's 18th writing credit, Vlaming's fifth writing credit, Shang's first writing credit, and Dahl's second directing credit. The episode was originally scheduled to air on July 30, 2015, but it moved to August 1, 2015, when NBC decided to move the rest of the season to Saturdays.

== Reception ==
=== Viewers ===
The episode was watched by 1.02 million viewers, earning a 0.3/1 in the 18-49 rating demographics on the Nielson ratings scale. This means that 0.3 percent of all households with televisions watched the episode, while 1 percent of all households watching television at that time watched it. This was a slight increase from the previous episode, which was watched by 0.96 million viewers with a 0.3/1 in the 18-49 demographics. With these ratings, Hannibal ranked third on its timeslot and ninth for the night in the 18-49 demographics, behind a Running Wild with Bear Grylls rerun, two Home Free reruns, two 48 Hours episodes, Boston EMS, and two Family Feud episodes.

With DVR factored, the episode was watched by 1.52 million viewers with a 0.5 on the 18-49 demo.

=== Critical reviews ===
"...And the Woman Clothed with the Sun" received very positive reviews from critics. Eric Goldman of IGN gave the episode a "great" 8.8 out of 10 and wrote in his verdict: "The second installment of the Red Dragon story began to really show the characters intermixing again, and there's a lot of fascinating dynamics at work. Will's interplay with everyone from Hannibal to Alana to Freddie was fueled by all that's happened so far, while it still is an intriguing question trying to figure out if Hannibal really wishes Will wasn't being brought back into this world or not. Clearly though, it is taking a toll on Will again, but has he put his life back together enough to keep the worst at bay? But in the meantime... he took the dog! Aww"

Molly Eichel of The A.V. Club gave the episode an "A−" and wrote, "Hannibal may be behind glass, separated from Will, but they're still a family, whether Will wants them to be or not. That's the narrative that Hannibal pushes throughout their initial meetings about the murders committed by Francis Dolarhyde."

Alan Sepinwall of HitFix wrote, "That Dolarhyde has the ability to make an unmonitored phone call to Hannibal seems a bit of a stretch, but communication between the two is a part of the original story, and another way to make Hannibal seem vital even while he's behind ventilated glass." Mark Rozeman of Paste gave the episode an 8.9 out of 10 and wrote, "After last week's plot-heavy opener, 'And the Woman Clothed with the Sun...' spends much of its time eschewing eye-popping set pieces in favor of slowly pushing forward character. In fact, other than Dolarhyde meeting Reba, not a whole lot of particular note really happens in this installment. And while this does make for some lapses in momentum, it also helps lay foundation for the craziness that is sure to follow." Jeff Stone of IndieWire gave the episode a "B" and wrote, "The episode concludes with Dolarhyde successfully contacting Hannibal by phone, by pretending to be his lawyer. One might think it would be a little tougher to get Hannibal on the phone like that when one has a notably speech impediment and growls and hisses like a dragon man, but then I don't run a psychiatric hospital, so what do I know?"

Brian Moylan of The Guardian wrote, "Strangely enough, Hannibal is all about family, even when that family isn't Will and Hannibal's sexless same-sex marriage or someone going around gurgling about a 'Verger baby'. This episode especially was about everyone imagining their own special version of what a family should be, and that always leads to complications in their own lives." Keith Staskiewicz of Entertainment Weekly wrote, "Hannibal clearly can't prevent himself from sticking his fingers in Will's brain and poking around. He chastises Jack for involving Will in the case, but Jack has known Hannibal long enough and well enough to know that if you put the chess pieces down in front of him, he can't help but play. Even if he's a super-genius whose schemes have more layers than a millefeuille, the scorpion is still a scorpion and cannot fight his nature." Chuck Bowen of Slant Magazine wrote, "Bryan Fuller's Hannibal operates as a full-tilt relationship melodrama this week. The actual hunt for Francis Dolarhyde, a.k.a. the Tooth Fairy, a.k.a. Red Dragon, takes an emotional backseat to a variety of couples who're sorting through almost comically elaborate assemblies of skeletons in the closet. As with nearly every other episode of this series, 'And the Woman Clothed with the Sun' is composed of alternating duets of escalating intensity."

Greg Cwik of Vulture gave the episode a perfect 5 star rating out of 5 and wrote, "'And the Woman Clothed With the Sun' has a low-key yet eloquent look, courtesy of director John Dahl. Dahl, whose dialogue-centric neo-noirs skulk in seedy underworlds, knows how to visualize the essence of dialogue while keeping twisty, turn-y plots in check." Kayti Burt of Den of Geek gave the episode a 3.5 star rating out of 5 and wrote, "'And The Woman Clothed' was a beautiful, expertly-acted piece of television that took the theme of family to explore how one can be saved by and/or destroyed by the people we call family." Nick McHatton of TV Fanatic gave the episode a 4.5 star rating out of 5 and wrote, "'A Woman Clothed With the Sun...' was a solid effort. The show is really returning to its roots, and it has once again become appointment television. With just four episodes remaining, I really have no clue how the show will end. Hopefully it isn't chock full of cliffhangers, but considering when the cancelation news came out. I'm not overly optimistic we'll get the cliffhanger-free ending we deserve. Then again, I'm not quite sure a cliffhanger-free ending would be true to the show."

Emma Dibdin of Digital Spy wrote, "'Family entertainment' isn't the first phrase that springs to mind when you think of Hannibal, but 'And the Woman Clothed with the Sun...' is very much about happy families, and what it takes to make or break them." Adam Lehrer of Forbes wrote, "Hannibal, back in the present, is told he has a call from his attorney. It's from Francis Dolarhyde. He's delighted that Hannibal has taken an interest in his case, because he knows that Hannibal alone can understand what he's becoming. Hannibal asks what that is. 'THE GREAT. RED. DRAGON!'"
