= Sakizuke (Hannibal) =

- Hannibal episode
- Episode no.: Season 2 Episode 2
- Directed by: Tim Hunter
- Written by: Jeff Vlaming; Bryan Fuller
- Cinematography by: James Hawkinson
- Editing by: Michael Doherty
- Production code: 202
- Original air date: March 7, 2014
- Running time: 43 minutes

Guest appearances
- Gillian Anderson as Bedelia Du Maurier (special guest star); Cynthia Nixon as Kade Prurnell; Martin Donovan as Therapist; Ryan Field as Roland Umber; Patrick Garrow as Killer; Ted Ludzik as Nurse

Episode chronology
← Previous "Kaiseki"	Next → "Hassun"
- Hannibal season 2

"Sakizuke" is the second episode of the second season of the psychological thriller–horror series Hannibal. It is the 15th overall episode of the series and was written by co-executive producer Jeff Vlaming and series creator Bryan Fuller, and directed by Tim Hunter. It was first broadcast on March 7, 2014, on NBC.

The series is based on characters and elements appearing in Thomas Harris' novels Red Dragon and Hannibal, with focus on the relationship between FBI special investigator Will Graham (Hugh Dancy) and Dr. Hannibal Lecter (Mads Mikkelsen), a forensic psychiatrist destined to become Graham's most cunning enemy. The episode revolves around BAU continuing the investigation of the serial killer, having just found a recent corpse who escaped from his "human mural". Katz asks Graham for help in the case, and she will help in proving his innocence.

According to Nielsen Media Research, the episode was seen by an estimated 2.50 million household viewers and gained a 0.8/3 ratings share among adults aged 18–49. The episode received critical acclaim, with critics praising the episode for maintaining momentum from a promising season premiere, the opening scene, the performances and cinematography.

== Plot ==
At the grain silo, Roland Umber (Ryan Field) removes himself from the attached bodies but loses part of his skin in the progress. He exits the silo just as the killer arrives in a truck. Umber runs through a cornfield while the killer chases him with a rifle. He suddenly finds himself cornered as he reaches the edge of a cliff towards a river. Seeing no other choice, he jumps off the cliff. However, he hits a rock before he hits the water, dying from the impact.

Bedelia Du Maurier (Gillian Anderson) visits Lecter (Mads Mikkelsen) at his office and tells him she will no longer serve as his psychiatrist, deeming him dangerous and finding herself unable to change him. BAU recovers Umber's corpse, but the team thinks the killer discarded the body. Lecter detects the scent of a cornfield on Umber's body, but does not share this information with the BAU team. During the investigation, Crawford (Laurence Fishburne) realizes that Katz (Hettienne Park) consulted Graham (Hugh Dancy) on cases without permission. He chastises her, but gives her tacit permission to continue consulting Graham. Meanwhile, Lecter resumes therapy with Graham, who has asked him for help, claiming that he is uncertain whether or not he or Lecter is guilty. From pictures of the bodies, Graham deduces the killer is working on a "human mural" by stitching corpses together.

Despite being warned by Crawford to stop meeting him, Katz asks Graham for more information. He deduces that Umber escaped and died during his getaway. To return the favor, Katz promises to help Graham prove his innocence. Lecter manages to find the grain silo containing the corpses. He climbs to the roof of the silo and, looking down, sees the bodies laid out in a mural in the shape of a human eye. The killer enters the silo and Lecter greets him politely.

Later, Lecter accompanies the BAU in investigating the silo, and is shown the mural, with the killer's body now sewn into the position Umber escaped from. The killer's body has also had his leg cut off to fit into position. At a session with his therapist (Martin Donovan), Crawford states he does not feel guilty about his treatment of Graham, but of the consequences he claims affected others. Lecter and Katz once again consult Graham, who deduces that the body at the center of the mural is the killer's, and was placed there by a second murderer. Flashbacks reveal that Lecter was the person who killed him and stitched him into the mural, convincing the killer to complete his own work so that God will be able to see him in his art. Graham is later visited by Prurnell (Cynthia Nixon), who offers him a chance to avoid death penalty by pleading guilty, but Graham refuses to cooperate. Bedelia then visits Graham, and despite being warned by the guards to keep her distance, closely approaches Graham to say, "I believe you" before she is removed. That night, Lecter arrives at Bedelia's house, planning to kill her. However, he finds her house abandoned and the furniture covered, discovering that she has left him a bottle of her perfume.

== Production ==
=== Development ===
In February 2014, it was announced that the second episode of the season would be titled "Sakizuke" and that it would be written by co-executive producer Jeff Vlaming and series creator Bryan Fuller and Tim Hunter directing. This was Fuller's 12th writing credit, Vlaming's first writing credit, and Hunter's third directing credit.

According to Fuller, the episode serves as a two-parter with the previous episode, "Kaiseki", deeming it a "pseudo pilot".

=== Casting ===
In October 2013, it was announced that Martin Donovan would guest star in the series, playing Jack Crawford's therapist.

== Reception ==
=== Viewers ===
The episode was watched by 2.50 million viewers, earning a 0.8/3 in the 18-49 rating demographics on the Nielson ratings scale. This means that 0.8 percent of all households with televisions watched the episode, while 3 percent of all households watching television at that time watched it. This was a 24% decrease from the previous episode, which was watched by 3.27 million viewers with a 1.1/4 in the 18-49 demographics. With these ratings, Hannibal ranked third on its timeslot and tenth for the night in the 18-49 demographics, behind The Neighbors, Last Man Standing, Undercover Boss, Hawaii Five-0, Blue Bloods, Grimm, Dateline NBC, 20/20, and Shark Tank.

With DVR factored, the episode was watched with a 1.4 on the 18-49 demo.

=== Critical reviews ===
"Sakizuke" received critical acclaim. Eric Goldman of IGN gave the episode an "amazing" 9 out of 10 and wrote in his verdict, "Hannibal delivered another standout episode that included amazing gore, Lecter making one hell of a field trip and Will beginning to try to play Hannibal's game from behind bars." Molly Eichel of The A.V. Club gave the episode an "A−" and wrote:

What's interesting about the episodic element of 'Sakizuki,' though is that the killer is almost a non-entity. That's not bad, it's just different from how the series dealt with the murderers of the first season (with a few notable exceptions, like Lawrence Wells, the totem pole killer). Partially, it's out of necessity. There's just so much else going on that the muralist doesn't get a backstory or a reason for being that serves anything else to but to move the seasonal arc along. At the same time, it shows how rich Hannibal in that it does not need to rely on the traditional episodic killings that fueled its first season.

Alan Sepinwall of HitFix wrote, "Hannibal is 2-for-2 in season 2 so far, with an episode featuring horror, suspense, theology, more homages to classic Hannibal Lecter scenes and Will Graham quoting Sesame Street lyrics. Can't beat that with a stick." Mark Rozeman of Paste gave the episode a 9.5 out of 10 and wrote, "Hannibal's second episode makes for an effective one-two punch of a season opener. Now that Fuller and crew have moved past the initial trepidations of how Hannibal Lecter could work on television, they are free to experiment and bring Thomas Harris’ world and characters to life in new and exciting ways."

Marc Buxton of Den of Geek gave the episode a 4.5 star rating out of 5 and wrote, "Last week, Hannibal opened with one of the most visceral fight sequences in recent television history. This week, the show that is not afraid to take things to the edge and then take a flying leap over it presents a note perfect Grand Guignol horror sequence that is really not for the faint of heart." Kevin Fitzpatrick of ScreenCrush wrote, "It’s the subtle moments that fill in any cracks with Hannibal's facade, though occasionally episodes like 'Sakizuke' bristle against the holding pattern they seem to be caught in."
