= Kaiseki (Hannibal) =

- Hannibal episode
- Episode no.: Season 2 Episode 1
- Directed by: Tim Hunter
- Written by: Bryan Fuller; Steve Lightfoot
- Cinematography by: James Hawkinson
- Editing by: Stephen Philipson
- Production code: 201
- Original air date: February 28, 2014
- Running time: 42 minutes

Guest appearances
- Gillian Anderson as Bedelia Du Maurier (special guest star); Cynthia Nixon as Kade Prurnell; Raúl Esparza as Dr. Frederick Chilton; Ryan Field as Roland Umber; Patrick Garrow as Killer; Jonathan Tucker as Matthew Brown; Kalen Davidson as Stag Man; Eli Ham as Parks & Rec #1; Kevin Whalen as Parks & Rec #2

Episode chronology
← Previous "Savoureux"	Next → "Sakizuke"
- Hannibal season 2

"Kaiseki" is the first episode of the second season of the psychological thriller–horror series Hannibal. It is the 14th overall episode of the series and was written by series creator Bryan Fuller and executive producer Steve Lightfoot, and directed by Tim Hunter. It was first broadcast on February 28, 2014, on NBC.

The series is based on characters and elements appearing in Thomas Harris' novels Red Dragon and Hannibal, with focus on the relationship between FBI special investigator Will Graham (Hugh Dancy) and Dr. Hannibal Lecter (Mads Mikkelsen), a forensic psychiatrist destined to become Graham's most cunning enemy. The episode revolves around BAU following the track of a killer, who disposed bodies on a river after deeming them useless. With Graham incarcerated, Lecter aids BAU in the case. Meanwhile, Graham goes through therapy with Bloom in order to find more about his lost memories.

According to Nielsen Media Research, the episode was seen by an estimated 3.27 million household viewers and gained a 1.1/4 ratings share among adults aged 18–49. The episode received critical acclaim, with critics highlighting the opening fight scene, new setting, performances, writing, cinematography and terrifying final scene.

== Plot ==
The episode opens in medias res as Dr. Hannibal Lecter (Mads Mikkelsen) prepares a meal at his house before Jack Crawford (Laurence Fishburne) suddenly arrives. They exchange a tense look before they begin a brutal fight – Crawford brandishing his gun and Lecter throwing a knife – which appears to end when Crawford chokes Lecter until he becomes unconscious. However, Lecter is faking and stabs Crawford in the neck with a shard of glass. Bleeding profusely, Crawford manages to lock himself in the pantry while Lecter, knife at hand, attempts to enter by beating the door down.

Twelve weeks earlier, Lecter prepares kaiseki for Crawford. Their conversation reveals that both men are under investigation for misconduct in relation to Will Graham's (Hugh Dancy) apparent murder spree. Crawford and Dr. Alana Bloom (Caroline Dhavernas) are questioned by Kade Prurnell (Cynthia Nixon), an investigator for the Inspector General's Office. Bloom has lodged a misconduct complaint against Crawford for letting Graham continue to work despite his mental deterioration, and she refuses to recant her complaint despite pressure from Prurnell, who is eager to avoid any public embarrassment of the FBI. Meanwhile, Graham is questioned in his cell by Dr. Frederick Chilton (Raúl Esparza), who is determined to find everything wrong with him. He is also constantly visited by Lecter, who is curious about his progress.

In Rockville, Maryland, two city workers discover six corpses on a river. Lecter helps the BAU in the case, filling Graham's role of deducing the killer's motivations and methods. Graham, meanwhile, has started therapy with Bloom, who wants to help him fill the gaps in his memory through the use of hypnosis, but this is apparently unsuccessful. Elsewhere, a young man named Roland Umber (Ryan Field) is approached by an unseen person in a subway train. At his house, he notices plastic wrap on his car and while he inspects, he is kidnapped and taken to an unknown location, where the kidnapper injects him with heroin and sprays him with water.

Lecter theorizes that the killer is preserving the bodies to create a human model collection and that those in the river are imperfect castoffs. At the hospital, Graham has a flashback of Lecter forcing Abigail's ear down his throat with the use of a plastic tube. He pleads Crawford for help, but Crawford is not convinced of his claims as they haven't found a single piece of evidence against Lecter. That night, Umber wakes up inside a grain silo. He finds that he is stitched to a collection of dead bodies in the silo and screams in horror.

== Production ==
=== Development ===
In June 2013, Bryan Fuller announced that the first episode of the season would be titled "Kaiseki". NBC would confirm the title in February 2014, with Fuller and executive producer Steve Lightfoot writing the episode and Tim Hunter directing. This was Fuller's 11th writing credit, Lightfoot's fourth writing credit, and Hunter's second directing credit.

According to Fuller, the episode serves as a two-parter with the following episode, "Sakizuke", deeming it a "pseudo pilot". He also teased, "Will knows something no one else knows, and it's a great place to put a character. One of the things I was most excited about in Season 2 was seeing Will Graham hit rock bottom."

=== Casting ===
In September 2013, Cynthia Nixon joined the series in the recurring role of Kade Prurnell, "an employee of the Office of the Inspector General in FBI Oversight who is investigating the events of the first season and Jack Crawford's culpability." According to Fuller, Prurnell was based on the character Paul Krendler, who debuted in the novel The Silence of the Lambs. As the series did not have access to characters originating from the novel, Fuller changed the name, with "Kade Prurnell" serving as an anagram for "Paul Krendler".

The episode also introduced Jonathan Tucker as Matthew Brown, an orderly at the Baltimore State Hospital for the Criminally Insane. The original plan was having the character Barney Matthews, who appeared in The Silence of the Lambs. However, the series did not receive permission to use it, so the producers created a new character based on Barney, making him "younger and perhaps a little more opportunistic." Fuller said that if they had access to Barney Matthews, he would have wanted Chi McBride, whom he worked with on Pushing Daisies, to play him.

=== Writing ===
On the opening fight, Fuller commented, "I felt like we had so many moves during the season that were as exciting (if not more exciting), and it felt like the logical conclusion to the Jack Crawford/Hannibal Lecter relationship would be a knock-down, drag-out fight of some sort." He also said, "we knew that there was going to be a conversation that you didn't hear, and also circumstances that you wouldn't have assumed going into it with Jack Crawford actually showing up, having gone rogue and taking matters into his own hands, and essentially coming to dinner as a vigilante."

== Reception ==
=== Viewers ===
The episode was watched by 3.27 million viewers, earning a 1.1/4 in the 18-49 rating demographics on the Nielson ratings scale. This means that 1.1 percent of all households with televisions watched the episode, while 4 percent of all households watching television at that time watched it. This was a massive 65% increase from the previous episode, which was watched by 1.98 million viewers with a 0.8/2 in the 18-49 demographics. But it was a 25% decrease from the previous season premiere, which was watched by 4.36 million viewers with a 1.6/5 in the 18-49 demographics. With these ratings, Hannibal ranked third on its timeslot and ninth for the night in the 18-49 demographics, behind Dateline NBC, Last Man Standing, Undercover Boss, Grimm, Hawaii Five-0, Blue Bloods, 20/20, and Shark Tank.

With DVR factored, the episode was watched with a 1.9 on the 18-49 demo.

=== Critical reviews ===
"Kaiseki" received critical acclaim. Eric Goldman of IGN gave the episode an "amazing" 9 out of 10 and wrote in his verdict, "Hannibal returned just as great as ever, with a busy premiere that showed us Will Graham's new scenario and how it's affecting those around him. And wow, that opening scene sure raises the excitement level about what's to come..."

Molly Eichel of The A.V. Club gave the episode a "B+" and wrote, "Well, shit. If the opening scene of 'Kaiseki,' the first episode of Hannibal's second season doesn't get you excited for what's to come, then this probably isn't the show for you. That opening fight scene (smartly put online early by NBC to whet appetites) was fantastic, setting a clear path for how the rest of the season will go."

Alan Sepinwall of HitFix wrote, "I wonder if, by the time we get to the Jack/Hannibal brawl, Lecter will have given himself in some way because he's started to take his new role too seriously. Add in more fine sparring between Mikkelsen and Gillian Anderson, and the introduction of Cynthia Nixon as the federal examiner who just wants the Will Graham mess to go away, and you've got a marvelous opening course of season 2." Mark Rozeman of Paste gave the episode a 9.6 out of 10 and wrote, "'Kaiseki' shows no sign of any potential second season slump and, indeed, sets the bar high for future episodes. Assuming that Hannibal manages to keep going, I firmly believe that this show will serve as the proverbial wrecking ball in demolishing the final barrier in the cable/network divide. Hyperbole be damned — it's that much of a game-changer. In an age where television offers up a wealth of riches, Hannibal currently stands firmly among the best the medium has to offer."

Gerri Mahn of Den of Geek gave the episode a perfect 5 star rating out of 5 and wrote, "The Hannibal season 2 premiere is a flawless example of just how good network television can be." Kevin Fitzpatrick of ScreenCrush wrote, "All in all, 'Kaiseki' doesn't exactly bring anything new to the table that we haven't come to expect from Fuller's disturbingly beautiful drama, but that isn't to find any fault in it. We've got plenty to chew on as Will recovers his memories, and Hannibal continues to put Bedelia on edge with his FBI transparency. We still question if the opening showdown might have been better served as a surprise later on, but for now, Hannibal remains as fascinating and visceral as ever, a delectable feast among an otherwise pedestrian spread of serial killer filler."

=== Accolades ===
TVLine named Laurence Fishburne the "Performer of the Week" for the week of March 1, 2014, for his performance in the episode. The site wrote, "As Hannibal and Jack battled for their lives in Lecter's tricked-out kitchen, Fishburne turned in a physical performance that was elegant in its brutality. He hurled his body (and co-star Mads Mikkelsen) around the set, throwing his all into a fight scene as beautiful as anything else the show has shot. Here's hoping that Fishburne's Jack makes it out of that closet alive."
