= The Great Red Dragon (Hannibal) =

- Hannibal episode
- Episode no.: Season 3 Episode 8
- Directed by: Neil Marshall
- Written by: Nick Antosca; Steve Lightfoot; Bryan Fuller
- Cinematography by: James Hawkinson
- Editing by: Ben Wilkinson
- Production code: 308
- Original air dates: July 23, 2015 (Canada); July 25, 2015 (U.S.)
- Running time: 44 minutes

Guest appearances
- Richard Armitage as Francis Dolarhyde; Raúl Esparza as Dr. Frederick Chilton; Nina Arianda as Molly Graham; Gabriel Browning Rodriguez as Walter; Nola Martin as Mrs. Leeds; Blair Johannes as Mr. Leeds; Rory Moy as Chinese Dentist; Chris Ip as Chinese Tattoo Artist; Peter Spence as Mr. Lombard; Devon Philipson as Leeds Boy #1; Gabriel Varga-Watt as Leeds Boy #2

Episode chronology
← Previous "Digestivo"	Next → "...And the Woman Clothed with the Sun"
- Hannibal season 3

"The Great Red Dragon" is the eighth episode of the third season of the psychological thriller–horror series Hannibal. It is the 34th overall episode of the series and was written by co-producer Nick Antosca, executive producer Steve Lightfoot and series creator Bryan Fuller and directed by Neil Marshall. It was first broadcast on July 23, 2015, on Canada, and then July 25, 2015 on NBC.

The series is based on characters and elements appearing in Thomas Harris' novels Red Dragon and Hannibal, with focus on the relationship between FBI special investigator Will Graham (Hugh Dancy) and Dr. Hannibal Lecter (Mads Mikkelsen), a forensic psychiatrist destined to become Graham's most cunning enemy. The episode revolves around a new threat, Francis Dolarhyde, who seems fascinated by The Great Red Dragon paintings, motivating him to become a serial killer. Jack Crawford approaches a retired Will Graham for help while Hannibal Lecter has spent three years in jail.

According to Nielsen Media Research, the episode was seen by an estimated 0.96 million household viewers and gained a 0.3/1 ratings share among adults aged 18–49. The episode received critical acclaim, with critics praising the new storyline, Richard Armitage's performance, Neil Marshall's directing, visual style and pace.

== Plot ==
In a cafeteria, a man named Francis Dolarhyde (Richard Armitage) sees an issue of TIME magazine containing a retrospective of The Great Red Dragon paintings. Inspired by the paintings, he begins working out and has The Great Red Dragon and the Woman Clothed in Sun painting tattooed on his back. He shows devotion to the artwork, revealing an obsession with the paintings.

After Lecter (Mads Mikkelsen) is arrested, he is placed in a cell at the Baltimore State Hospital for the Criminally Insane. Three years later, he pulls the insanity defense and constantly talks with Bloom (Caroline Dhavernas), who is the hospital's new administrator. He also dines with Dr. Chilton (Raúl Esparza), who has retired and is now focused on writing novels. Meanwhile, Dolarhyde has become even more devoted to the paintings, to the point that he is now talking with his cleft upper lip. Later, he is seen naked outside a home, covered in blood.

During a dinner, Chilton brings up the topic of "The Tooth Fairy", Dolarhyde himself, who kills families on each new moon. Chilton later learns from Bloom that Lecter has written an article for The American Journal of Psychiatry, which will try to discredit Chilton and all his claims. Dolarhyde is later seen sticking paper clips on a book, chronicling his crimes as well as Lecter's arrest and crimes. Crawford (Laurence Fishburne) visits a now-retired Graham (Hugh Dancy) at his new house. Graham is now married to a woman named Molly (Nina Arianda) and lives with her and her son, Walter (Gabriel Browning Rodriguez). Crawford wants Graham to help them in investigating The Tooth Fairy but Graham wants to leave the past behind due to Lecter.

After discussing it with Crawford, Molly convinces Graham to go with Crawford and help. He finds a letter from Lecter, who knows about Crawford's offer, telling him not to get involved in the investigation as "it's dark on the other side and madness is waiting". Graham goes to Buffalo, New York in order to re-enact the crime scene with his "ability". Price (Scott Thompson) and Zeller (Aaron Abrams) investigate one of the bodies, discovering that the killer put broken mirror pieces on the victims' eye in order to see himself and get a trace of the victim's eye.

That night, Dolarhyde suffers an hallucination, which has been occurring ever since he started worshipping the paintings. Needing more information to think about the Tooth Fairy, Graham asks Crawford to meet Lecter. At his cell, Graham and Lecter greet after not seeing each other in three years.

== Production ==
=== Development ===
In March 2015, Bryan Fuller announced that the eighth episode of the season would be titled "The Great Red Dragon" and that it would be directed by Neil Marshall. NBC would confirm the title in July 2015, with co-producer Nick Antosca, executive producer Steve Lightfoot and series creator Bryan Fuller writing the episode and Marshall directing. This was Fuller's 28th writing credit, Lightfoot's 17th writing credit, Antosca's second writing credit, and Marshall's first directing credit. The episode was originally scheduled to air on July 23, 2015, but it moved to July 25, 2015, when NBC decided to move the remainder of the season to Saturdays.

=== Writing ===
Fuller explained that the episode would serve as the beginning of a new chapter of the season, "the first half of the season will have its finale that reaches a climax and wraps up that story in a great way, and then we start a new story, and then that will have its own climax at the end of the season. Two separate stories that'll have two finales and so you get two seasons for the price of one."

=== Casting ===
In July 2014, Fuller confirmed that Francis Dolarhyde would make his debut in the eighth episode, which will then allow them to adapt Red Dragon. In January 2015, Richard Armitage was announced to play Dolarhyde, "a serial killer with a set of chompers that would make the Big Bad Wolf a little envious — and a penchant for targeting entire households for slaughter." The episode also introduced Will Graham's wife, Molly, with Nina Arianda joining the series in January 2015.

== Reception ==
=== Viewers ===
The episode was watched by 0.96 million viewers, earning a 0.3/1 in the 18-49 rating demographics on the Nielson ratings scale. This means that 0.3 percent of all households with televisions watched the episode, while 1 percent of all households watching television at that time watched it. This was a slight decrease from the previous episode, which was watched by 0.97 million viewers with a 0.3/1 in the 18-49 demographics. With these ratings, Hannibal ranked third on its timeslot and ninth for the night in the 18-49 demographics, behind a NCIS: Los Angeles rerun, a Running Wild with Bear Grylls rerun, Scorpion, two BattleBots episodes, 48 Hours, Bostom EMS, and UFC on Fox: Dillashaw vs. Barão 2.

With DVR factored, the episode was watched by 1.43 million viewers with a 0.5 on the 18-49 demo.

=== Critical reviews ===
"The Great Red Dragon" received critical acclaim. Eric Goldman of IGN gave the episode a "great" 8.3 out of 10 and wrote in his verdict: "Given it was such a reset and re-start, in many ways, 'The Great Red Dragon' slowed down considerably from the last few episodes. This will be tricky territory for the show, because we have seen this particular story told twice before in feature films, along with how familiar the 'Hannibal behind bars' dynamic is. But as this episode reminded us, these versions of Hannibal and Will are fueled by a very different, more complex history together that makes it all the more meaningful when they come face to face at the end, and say that classic, 'Hello, Dr. Lecter' / 'Hello, Will' exchange."

Molly Eichel of The A.V. Club gave the episode an "A−" and wrote, "Bodies are bodies and men are subject to the same lustful camerawork that women usually are. That's partly due to the work of Neil Marshall, director of The Descent, who makes his debut directing with 'The Great Red Dragon', and it's a welcome one. The visual flourishes were particularly nice, such as the blood-moon that marked the Leeds' passing, and the film monster that Dolarhyde became at the sound of the scratching record."

Alan Sepinwall of HitFix wrote, "And after the show gave us an inversion of Will and Hannibal's first 'Red Dragon' encounter at the end of season 1, we got the proper arrangement of it here, with the promise of all kinds of new mind games between these two." Mark Rozeman of Paste gave the episode a 9.4 out of 10 and wrote, "'The Great Red Dragon' provides an excellent intro to the season's final big arc. From a writing standpoint, I'm just happy that the show will now be using episodes titles that don't require me to cut-and-paste and/or constantly spellcheck. In all seriousness though, it's an exciting prospect to see one of my favorite novels being filtered through the mind of one of my favorite TV scribes. It's truly a fan fiction-esque melding of minds that I couldn't be more excited to see play out." Jeff Stone of IndieWire gave the episode an "A" and wrote, "Armitage doesn't say a word the entire episode, but his physicality is top-notch, perfectly conveying Dolarhyde's transformation into the Dragon. He should be a formidable presence for the remainder of the season."

Brian Moylan of The Guardian wrote, "Either way, Will ends up investigating the crime and we see something we haven't seen all season: Will looking at a crime scene and reenacting it in his mind. It's an especially grisly one, in which the Red Dragon kills a mother, a father, and their two children, placing shards of a mirror on their mouth and eyes and in some other places. He also has to touch the mother; making skin-on-skin contact is somehow imperative to his ritual. We don't know why he does this or what drives him to kill, but we know it's going to happen again, and it is the thing that brings Will and Hannibal back together. This really can't be good for anyone, can it?" Keith Staskiewicz of Entertainment Weekly wrote, "No doubt the Red Dragon will fit in perfectly here. William Blake's poetry and artwork, with its awe-filled ruminations on God and death, are in the very syntax of Hannibal's language. Of anyone on television, Bryan Fuller and his directors know how to frame fearful symmetry." Chuck Bowen of Slant Magazine wrote, "Hannibal uses his own gifts for actively controlling perspectival rifts to imagine the cell as a great Florence flat with a wide, walk-in fireplace. This is how we usually see the cell, as an apparition of Hannibal's memory palace, which allows Fuller and company to stage Hannibal's scenes as if he's barely been imprisoned at all, preserving the balance of his power relationships with the other characters."

Greg Cwik of Vulture gave the episode a perfect 5 star rating out of 5 and wrote, "Hannibal has retained a lot of the plot points and dialogue from Harris's novels, with nods to the books and subsequent adaptations strewn about like Easter eggs for perceptive fans. But the most significant difference between the novels and Bryan Fuller's show is the relationship between Will and Hannibal." Kayti Burt of Den of Geek gave the episode a 4 star rating out of 5 and wrote, "The Italian arc often bordered on the avant garde — or as close to it as network TV is likely to ever get — and it was beautiful and strange and wondrous. It was refreshing in the most confusing and unsettling of ways. But that doesn’t mean it isn't nice to be back in more familiar narrative territory." Nick McHatton of TV Fanatic gave the episode a 4.5 star rating out of 5 and wrote, "This week gave us another great installment of Hannibal, as 'The Great Red Dragon' brought someone new that I've been looking forward to since this show started. Francis Dolarhyde, y'all. The Red Dragon is here."

Emma Dibdin of Digital Spy wrote, "There's been a hallucinatory quality to much of Hannibal's third season so far, its first seven episodes designed to disorient and blur the line between reality and nightmare. Despite being centred on a character who's having an actual psychotic break, 'The Great Red Dragon' is the most narratively straightforward and least head-trippy episode of the season yet, with a structure that feels much closer to the show's first season." Adam Lehrer of Forbes wrote, "Bryan Fuller has done an excellent job at taking the arguably tired world of Hannibal Lecter and making it feel entirely fresh. He has incorporated major characters from the books and films into his universe, but he re-worked the timeline and those characters' roles in his world. As a heartbroken Hannibal turned himself in on last week's episode, after learning that Will is indeed nothing like him, it felt like the end of a series. But, it's also the beginning of a new series, as this week's episode 'The Great Red Dragon' marks the first material that Fuller has directly adapted from the books." Britt Hayes of ScreenCrush wrote, "At the midseason mark, Hannibal has a moment of readjustment, switching gears almost effortlessly to transition into the future — three years down the line, and Will Graham is experiencing his Godfather moment. Just when he thought he was out, Jack Crawford pulls him back in to investigate the Tooth Fairy, a name our new killer despises, as 'The Great Red Dragon' is more to his demented liking."
