= Hassun (Hannibal) =

- Hannibal episode
- Episode no.: Season 2 Episode 3
- Directed by: Peter Medak
- Written by: Jason Grote; Steve Lightfoot
- Cinematography by: James Hawkinson
- Editing by: Ben Wilkinson
- Production code: 203
- Original air date: March 14, 2014
- Running time: 42 minutes

Guest appearances
- Cynthia Nixon as Kade Prurnell; Raúl Esparza as Dr. Frederick Chilton; Lara Jean Chorostecki as Freddie Lounds; Maria del Mar as Marion Vega; Shawn Doyle as Leonard Brauer; Barry Flatman as Judge Davies; Greg Dunham as Janitor

Episode chronology
← Previous "Sakizuke"	Next → "Takiawase"
- Hannibal season 2

"Hassun" is the third episode of the second season of the psychological thriller–horror series Hannibal. It is the 16th overall episode of the series and was written by Jason Grote and executive producer Steve Lightfoot, and directed by Peter Medak. It was first broadcast on March 14, 2014, on NBC.

The series is based on characters and elements appearing in Thomas Harris' novels Red Dragon and Hannibal, with focus on the relationship between FBI special investigator Will Graham (Hugh Dancy) and Dr. Hannibal Lecter (Mads Mikkelsen), a forensic psychiatrist destined to become Graham's most cunning enemy. The episode revolves around Will Graham's trial as he is charged with all the murders. The trial is also interrupted when Graham receives a severed human ear, as the killer may appear to contact him.

According to Nielsen Media Research, the episode was seen by an estimated 2.47 million household viewers and gained a 0.9/3 ratings share among adults aged 18–49. The episode received very positive reviews from critics, who praised the writing, art design, performances and character development.

== Plot ==
As Graham's (Hugh Dancy) murder trial begins, Crawford (Laurence Fishburne) is pressured by Prurnell (Cynthia Nixon) to save his own career by testifying against him. On the stand, Crawford states he pushed Graham into participating at the crime scenes in order to get effective results, which upsets Prurnell. Graham receives an envelope with a severed human ear. The BAU determines that the ear was removed from a corpse in the past 48 hours and some suspect that Graham did it despite being incarcerated. When Freddie Lounds (Lara Jean Chorostecki) takes the stand, she testifies that Abigail Hobbs told her that Graham was planning on killing and eating her. Graham's lawyer, Leonard Brauer (Shawn Doyle) attempts to discredit Lounds' testimony by highlighting multiple libel lawsuits.

The BAU discovers that the knife that cut the ear belongs to Graham, and was the same knife used on Abigail's ear. Interestingly, the knife was removed from the evidence room by Andrew Sykes, the bailiff. The FBI conducts a raid on Sykes' house on Milford Mill, Maryland, but the house is booby-trapped and explodes as the agents open the door. After containing the fire, Crawford finds Sykes' corpse mounted on a stag's head, his face cut into a Glasgow smile, his ear missing and evidence suggesting that he was burned before the explosion - each a hallmark of a murder attributed to Graham. As the trial continues, Lecter (Mads Mikkelsen) visits Graham to ask for help in the case. Although he is hopeful that this killer is responsible for the deaths he is accused of, Graham concludes that because Sykes was shot to death before being mutilated, this crime was committed by a different killer. While Lecter agrees on his theory, he convinces him to lie on the stand in order to save himself.

On the stand, Lecter testifies in favor of Graham, but the prosecution successfully convinces Judge Davies (Barry Flatman) that Sykes' death is irrelevant, leaving Graham without a defense. The next day, a janitor finds the Judge dead in the courtroom, hanging from chains while holding a scale with his heart and brain. Crawford tells Lecter that with his death, a mistrial is assured. Bloom (Caroline Dhavernas) meets with Graham, who believes the killer will try to contact him again.

== Production ==
In February 2014, it was announced that the third episode of the season would be titled "Hassun" and that it would be written by Jason Grote and executive producer Steve Lightfoot with Peter Medak directing. This was Grote's first writing credit, Lightfoot's fifth writing credit, and Medak's second directing credit.

== Reception ==
=== Viewers ===
The episode was watched by 2.47 million viewers, earning a 0.9/3 in the 18-49 rating demographics on the Nielson ratings scale. This means that 0.9 percent of all households with televisions watched the episode, while 3 percent of all households watching television at that time watched it. This was a slight decrease from the previous episode, which was watched by 2.50 million viewers with a 0.8/3 in the 18-49 demographics. With these ratings, Hannibal ranked third on its timeslot and eighth for the night in the 18-49 demographics, behind Dateline NBC, Undercover Boss, Hawaii Five-0, Blue Bloods, Grimm, 20/20, and Shark Tank.

With DVR factored, the episode was watched with a 1.5 on the 18-49 demo.

=== Critical reviews ===
"Hassun" received very positive reviews from critics. Eric Goldman of IGN gave the episode an "amazing" 9 out of 10 and wrote in his verdict, "This episode underlined just what Will means to Hannibal, in his own twisted way, as he asked Will if he was going to let this other killer's 'love go to waste' and testified on the stand that, 'Will Graham is and will always be my friend.' It's a testament to this show that it is able to fully realize Hannibal in this manner, where we can truly believe in his wish that he and Will can be lifelong friends and allies, while also understanding that Hannibal is a horrific person, who coldly commits depraved acts and who has jeopardized Will's future, in his attempt to protect himself."

Molly Eichel of The A.V. Club gave the episode a "B+" and wrote, "By the end of 'Hassun', rounding the corner into the main courses, Hannibal's creation of a Will Graham ham-handed straw-man fan to take credit for Will's crimes — or at least provide reasonable doubt — indicates the thin end of a wedge that's going to strain the rest of the season. The appearance of the stag as a way out, and Hannibal as warden of the cage, indicates that Hannibal will be facing down a very different Will: guarded, single-minded, and renegotiating who his allies are."

Alan Sepinwall of HitFix wrote, "The episode brought back Freddie Lounds and made me realize how little I had missed her in her absence. Obviously, we can spend a lot of time discussing the identity of this episode's killer but 'Hassun' as a whole was more functional than it was good, especially compared to this season's previous episodes." Mark Rozeman of Paste gave the episode an 8.8 out of 10 and wrote, "Ultimately, 'Hassun' lacks the sort of exuberant, take-no-prisoners dynamics that punctuated the previous two episodes. Considering how powerful the season's first two hours were, however, it's almost not fair to pass too much judgment since even a really strong episode would have felt like a step down. Still, it's an intriguing enough stepping stone to Will's eventual release and inches the narrative slowly towards the game-changing Jack-Hannibal confrontation we saw in the season opener. Leave it to Hannibal to leave even its stepping-stones coated in blood and disembodied organs."

Marc Buxton of Den of Geek gave the episode a 3.5 star rating out of 5 and wrote, "Hannibal is delicious as always this week." Kevin Fitzpatrick of ScreenCrush wrote, "It might get increasingly difficult to make Hannibal season 2 reviews a regular option every Friday night, but even with 'Hassun' the most uneventful episode of the three we've seen thus far, the series remains in good hands, properly artful and alarming in every way."
