= ...And the Beast from the Sea =

- Hannibal episode
- Episode no.: Season 3 Episode 11
- Directed by: Michael Rymer
- Written by: Steve Lightfoot; Bryan Fuller
- Cinematography by: James Hawkinson
- Editing by: Ben Wilkinson
- Production code: 311
- Original air dates: August 13, 2015 (Canada); August 15, 2015 (U.S.)
- Running time: 44 minutes

Guest appearances
- Richard Armitage as Francis Dolarhyde; Rutina Wesley as Reba McClane; Nina Arianda as Molly Graham; Gabriel Browning Rodriguez as Walter; Trudy Weiss as Grandmother Dolarhyde; Alana Bridgewater as Orderly; Sally Cahill as Veterinarian; Michael Dunston as Car Driver; Scott Anderson as Funeral Director

Episode chronology
← Previous "...And the Woman Clothed in Sun"	Next → "The Number of the Beast Is 666"
- Hannibal season 3

"...And the Beast from the Sea" is the eleventh episode of the third season of the psychological thriller–horror series Hannibal. It is the 37th overall episode of the series and was written by executive producer Steve Lightfoot and series creator Bryan Fuller, and directed by Michael Rymer. It was first broadcast on August 13, 2015 on Canada, and then August 15, 2015 on NBC.

The series is based on characters and elements appearing in Thomas Harris' novels Red Dragon and Hannibal, with focus on the relationship between FBI special investigator Will Graham (Hugh Dancy) and Dr. Hannibal Lecter (Mads Mikkelsen), a forensic psychiatrist destined to become Graham's most cunning enemy. The episode revolves around Francis Dolarhyde feeling his relationship with Reba is threatened by "The Great Red Dragon", who wants him to kill her. However, Hannibal Lecter convinces him that he can please him by killing someone else, directing him to Will Graham's family.

According to Nielsen Media Research, the episode was seen by an estimated 1.03 million household viewers and gained a 0.3/1 ratings share among adults aged 18–49. The episode received critical acclaim, with critics praising Richard Armitage's performances, Lecter's actions, writing, directing and character development.

== Plot ==
Graham (Hugh Dancy) talks with Crawford (Laurence Fishburne) and Bloom (Caroline Dhavernas) about encountering Dolarhyde (Richard Armitage) at the Brooklyn Museum. Graham deduces that Lecter (Mads Mikkelsen) knows about him, as he directed him to The Great Red Dragon paintings.

Through the phone, Dolarhyde has another session with Lecter. Dolarhyde claims that "The Great Red Dragon" is motivating him to kill Reba (Rutina Wesley). Lecter convinces him that he can please the Dragon by killing someone else. As Dolarhyde takes an interest in Graham, Lecter tells him to kill him and his family. That night, Dolarhyde hallucinates that he is becoming a dragon, with wings and a tail emerging from his body. He then watches home movies with Reba, whose blindness prevents her from seeing that he is watching Graham's family. The next day, Molly (Nina Arianda) discovers that their dogs have been poisoned but asks Walter (Gabriel Browning Rodriguez) not to tell Graham.

Graham questions Lecter about "The Tooth Fairy", although Lecter claims not to know much about him. Lecter questions if he can see his own family as the next victims. He claims to know who is the next target but won't disclose it, stating that he doesn't let them die, but rather Graham who lets them. That night, Dolarhyde sneaks into Graham's house in order to kill his family. However, Molly anticipates this and manages to make a distraction, allowing her and Walter to escape. They manage to stop a car but Dolarhyde kills the driver, forcing Molly to drive it herself. As she drives, Dolarhyde shoots her in the shoulder but they manage to escape, angering him.

Graham goes to the hospital while Molly is in surgery, comforting Walter in the waiting room. Even though Graham states he will catch the killer, Walter actually wants him to kill him. Lecter is visited by Bloom, who has found out that he hasn't talked to his attorney in a long time and was actually talking to the "Tooth Fairy". Crawford shows up and informs them that the hospital will surveil his phone calls in order to identify the killer. At home, Dolarhyde hallucinates being beaten by "The Great Red Dragon" for his failure. Worried that the Dragon will hurt her, Dolarhyde breaks up with Reba at her lab, although he doesn't express himself well and appears to blame Reba. She accepts it but asks him to leave.

Feeling dejected, Dolarhyde calls Lecter, while Crawford and Bloom are listening nearby. Dolarhyde expresses concern that he would return to his house as she appears to like him, and worries the Dragon will kill her. Lecter suddenly warns him that "they are listening" and hangs up. For his actions, Bloom removes all of Lecter's artwork and privileges, even his toilet. The team is also unable to find Dolarhyde, as he used Lecter's attorney's ID to make the calls.

Molly finally wakes up from the surgery and talks with Graham, knowing that Lecter sent Dolarhyde after her and Walter. She accuses Crawford of insubordination for putting them in danger, but Graham blames himself for letting them alone. He then confronts Lecter at his cell, telling him he is tired of him. Lecter admits sending Dolarhyde to kill his family and sending him the address, and even asks how Molly is. Graham realizes that Lecter motivated Dolarhyde into "becoming" the Red Dragon, viewing his crimes not as "murdering" but as "changing" the victims.

== Production ==
=== Development ===
In July 2015, NBC announced that the eleventh episode of the season would be titled "...And the Beast from the Sea", with executive producer Steve Lightfoot and series creator Bryan Fuller writing the episode and Michael Rymer directing. This was Fuller's 31st writing credit, Lightfoot's 19th writing credit, and Rymer's 8th directing credit.

== Reception ==
=== Viewers ===
The episode was watched by 1.03 million viewers, earning a 0.3/1 in the 18-49 rating demographics on the Nielson ratings scale. This means that 0.3 percent of all households with televisions watched the episode, while 1 percent of all households watching television at that time watched it. This was a slight increase from the previous episode, which was watched by 1.01 million viewers with a 0.3/1 in the 18-49 demographics. With these ratings, Hannibal ranked third on its timeslot and eighth for the night in the 18-49 demographics, behind a NCIS: Los Angeles rerun, a Beyond the Tank rerun, a 2015 U.S. National Gymnastics Championships game, Boston EMS, a America's Funniest Home Videos rerun, a Criminal Minds rerun, and 48 Hours.

With DVR factored, the episode was watched with a 0.4 on the 18-49 demo.

=== Critical reviews ===
"...And the Beast from the Sea" received critical acclaim. Eric Goldman of IGN gave the episode an "amazing" 9.2 out of 10 and wrote in his verdict: "This week's Hannibal continued to offer a lot of thrills and disturbing moments, while also offering a surprise for those of us thinking we were getting a pretty straightforward Red Dragon adaption. Now that the book's ending has been told, how will Dolarhyde's attacks culminate here? It's an exciting question."

Zack Handlen of The A.V. Club gave the episode an "A" and wrote, "'...And The Beast From The Sea' shows the latest consequences of this distraction: Molly and Walter stalked in their home after Hannibal gives Francis Dolarhyde Will's home address. Hannibal gives Will his usual oblique clues in the days leading up to the attack, clues which Will misses, and which then reinforce Hannibal's own sense of superiority. It's a bit like making a game, telling no one the rules, and patting yourself on the back every time you win like it's a genuine achievement. Or at least it would be if the fools around him weren't such obvious gluttons for punishment."

Alan Sepinwall of HitFix wrote, "This was another winner overall, with Richard Armitage continuing to bring both Dolarhyde and the Dragon to life with his intense physicality. Because we have such a history with Hannibal, it would be easy for Dolarhyde to feel like a distraction, or a plot device to force Will and Hannibal to resume their interactions. But Armitage and the way Fuller, Lightfoot and company have chosen to represent Dolarhyde's madness make him every bit as compelling as our two main characters." Mark Rozeman of Paste gave the episode a 9.5 out of 10 and wrote, "In any case, Hannibal continues its streak of greatness with '...And the Beast from the Sea.'" Jeff Stone of IndieWire gave the episode an "A−" and wrote, "Since there's no equivalent scene in 'Red Dragon', there's a strong sense that anything could happen. It's well within the realm of possibility."

Brian Moylan of The Guardian wrote, "Taking the novels of Thomas Harris and stripping them for emotionally wrenching, deeply disturbing parts and tossing out the rest, showrunner Bryan Fuller has managed to evade most of the big traps of simply translating prose into film. The past few episodes have seen the stretching of that approach, however, as the show finally, squarely, and perhaps too directly, hits the territory of Harris's novels – specifically Red Dragon." Keith Staskiewicz of Entertainment Weekly wrote, "'Don't you crave change, Will?' Hannibal asks. Because that's what Hannibal offers: He is chaos, he is entropy. He knows how to be the change he wants to see in the world, and the change he wants to see is terrifying." Chuck Bowen of Slant Magazine wrote, "'...And the Beast from the Sea' is structured as a perverse quasi romantic farce, in which two working-class guys are pitted against one another by a rarefied man who literally lives in a gilded cage."

Greg Cwik of Vulture gave the episode a 4 star rating out of 5 and wrote, "There are so many winks, nods, and jabs in 'And the Beast From the Sea', you might feel bruised by the end. But it works." Kayti Burt of Den of Geek gave the episode a 4 star rating out of 5 and wrote, "Hannibal no doubt still has plans for Dolarhyde. By not cooperating with the FBI, he loses the amenities and frills that made his prison cell 'comfortable'. What would he risk that for? While Will is 'just about worn out with you crazy sons of bitches', Hannibal, too, seems to be growing tired of the current rules of this game. With only two episodes left of this season and show, something tells me those rules are about to be changed." Robin Harry of TV Fanatic gave the episode a 4.5 star rating out of 5 and wrote, "Oh, the emotions that '...And the Beast From the Sea' made me feel. In yet another fantastic outing, this show laid every character bare and managed to raise my blood pressure doing it. If I had a crate full of Emmys, I would just go to the Hannibal set and hand them out to each actor who had a part in this hour. They all nailed it sooo hard."

Emma Dibdin of Digital Spy wrote, "In his eagerness to be steered and corrupted, Francis is the student Hannibal wished Will could have been, but has he really given up on corrupting Will? Maybe Hannibal sent Dolarhyde after Will's family banking on the idea that having lost them, Will would finally succumb to his own darkness, and complete the transformation he started all those years ago." Adam Lehrer of Forbes wrote, "At the mid-way point of the season, when the plot jumped ahead three years and The Red Dragon plot line initiated, Hannibal's role as the primary antagonist wasn't removed but altered. He is still the Master of Puppets and pulling all of the strings, but just because he is evil doesn't mean he is wrong. Hannibal believes people should act on their wills and be true to themselves, and that is exactly what he brings out of his former friend and his new pupil." Britt Hayes of ScreenCrush wrote, "A horrible line may have been crossed into Will's personal life, but even he admits — openly — that he cannot go home. It's not just the need to capture the Red Dragon; it's Will's obsession with the work and his attraction to men like Hannibal. He's just drawn to the worst kinds of men."
