= ...And the Woman Clothed in Sun =

- Hannibal episode
- Episode no.: Season 3 Episode 10
- Directed by: Guillermo Navarro
- Written by: Don Mancini; Bryan Fuller
- Cinematography by: James Hawkinson
- Editing by: Michael Doherty
- Production code: 310
- Original air dates: August 6, 2015 (Canada); August 8, 2015 (U.S.)
- Running time: 44 minutes

Guest appearances
- Richard Armitage as Francis Dolarhyde; Rutina Wesley as Reba McClane; Zachary Quinto as Neal Frank; Alana Bridgewater as Orderly; Helen Taylor as Docent; Nicholas Rice as Tour Guide; Mio Adilman as Dentist

Episode chronology
← Previous "...And the Woman Clothed with the Sun"	Next → "...And the Beast from the Sea"
- Hannibal season 3

"...And the Woman Clothed in Sun" is the tenth episode of the third season of the psychological thriller–horror series Hannibal. It is the 36th overall episode of the series and was written by producer Don Mancini, and series creator Bryan Fuller, and directed by Guillermo Navarro. It was first broadcast on August 6, 2015 on Canada, and then August 8, 2015 on NBC.

The series is based on characters and elements appearing in Thomas Harris' novels Red Dragon and Hannibal, with focus on the relationship between FBI special investigator Will Graham (Hugh Dancy) and Dr. Hannibal Lecter (Mads Mikkelsen), a forensic psychiatrist destined to become Graham's most cunning enemy. The episode revolves around the investigation on "The Tooth Fairy", a serial killer. The killer, Francis Dolarhyde, starts a new relationship with Reba McClane but feels that the paintings are influencing him to commit murders, one of which involves her.

According to Nielsen Media Research, the episode was seen by an estimated 1.01 million household viewers and gained a 0.3/1 ratings share among adults aged 18–49. The episode received critical acclaim, with critics praising the performances (especially Richard Armitage and Gillian Anderson), the writing, directing, pace and Dolarhyde's character development.

== Plot ==
Dolarhyde (Richard Armitage) practices his speaking before contacting the institution where Lecter (Mads Mikkelsen) is held, beginning the conversation they had in the previous episode. He then imagines a therapy session with Lecter, explaining how he feels compelled by "The Great Red Dragon".

Bedelia Du Maurier (Gillian Anderson) is giving a lecture detailing her experience with Lecter when she is approached by Graham (Hugh Dancy). He calls her out for aligning with Lecter, but she notes he is still interested in Lecter. Meanwhile, Dolarhyde takes Reba (Rutina Wesley) to a zoo, allowing her the experience of touching a sleeping tiger. Dolarhyde, who views the tiger as shining brighter, feels worried when Reba lifts her hand to the tiger's teeth, but she is safe. They then go to Dolarhyde's house, where they have sex. Dolarhyde then imagines Reba bathed in a yellow light, in the exact same manner as The Great Red Dragon and the Woman Clothed with the Sun painting.

When Dolarhyde wakes up the next morning, he has an hallucination. He then suddenly sees Reba has disappeared and runs off to the attic where he keeps the paintings and finds Reba nearby. The hallucinations and the power of the painting make Dolarhyde see that the "Dragon" wants him to kill Reba. From his cell, Lecter uses the phone but manages to divert the hospital's attention by passing through the lines, eventually getting to contact Chilton's office, where he manages to get Graham's phone and address.

Graham questions Bedelia's intentions and she recalls her encounter with Neal Frank (Zachary Quinto), a patient referred to her by Lecter. He believes something is wrong with Lecter, feeling his sessions with him actually worsened his condition. Having rejected Lecter's medicaments, he asks for her advice, and she states she will give him the exact medicaments that Lecter gave him. Angered, Frank then starts to choke on his tongue. Bedelia tries to save him by clearing his airway but ends up shoving her hand down to Frank's throat, accidentally killing him. Back to the present, Bedelia tells Graham that he can still save himself.

Graham visits Lecter to talk more about "The Tooth Fairy", with Lecter noting that he kills families in order to help his "becoming". During the conversation, Lecter mentions The Great Red Dragon paintings. At the Brooklyn Museum, Dolarhyde poses as a writer to gain access to a painting: the original copy of The Great Red Dragon and the Woman Clothed in Sun. After knocking out the docent in charge, he touches the original painting and starts eating the paper. However, Graham is also at the museum. Dolarhyde hides in an elevator in order to avoid being seen. Graham catches him, but Dolarhyde throws him out of the elevator and escapes. Graham goes upstairs, finding no sign of Dolarhyde.

== Production ==
=== Development ===
In April 2015, Guillermo Navarro announced that he would direct the tenth episode of the season. In July 2015, NBC announced that the tenth episode of the season would be titled "...And the Woman Clothed in Sun", with producer Don Mancini and series creator Bryan Fuller writing the episode and Navarro directing. This was Fuller's 30th writing credit, Mancini's second writing credit, and Navarro's fifth directing credit.

== Reception ==
=== Viewers ===
The episode was watched by 1.01 million viewers, earning a 0.3/1 in the 18-49 rating demographics on the Nielson ratings scale. This means that 0.3 percent of all households with televisions watched the episode, while 1 percent of all households watching television at that time watched it. This was a slight decrease from the previous episode, which was watched by 1.02 million viewers with a 0.3/1 in the 18-49 demographics. With these ratings, Hannibal ranked third on its timeslot and ninth for the night in the 18-49 demographics, behind a Home Free rerun, a Running Wild with Bear Grylls rerun, a Bachelor in Paradise rerun, Bostom EMS, a Hawaii Five-0 rerun, a America's Funniest Home Videos rerun, and two 48 Hours episodes.

With DVR factored, the episode was watched with a 0.4 on the 18-49 demo.

=== Critical reviews ===
"...And the Woman Clothed in Sun" received critical acclaim. Eric Goldman of IGN gave the episode an "amazing" 9 out of 10 and wrote in his verdict: "This episode ended with the first face to face encounter between Will and Dolarhyde, who showed just how physically strong he was – tossing Will from that elevator like he was weightless. This was on the heels of him literally consuming the Red Dragon painting, which was shown in an appropriately creepy, 'what the hell?!' manner. With Dolarhyde and Hannibal now directly aligned, things are much more dangerous for Will than realizes, as this story continues to build in a satisfying manner."

Molly Eichel of The A.V. Club gave the episode an "A" and wrote, "Like '...And The Woman Clothed With The Sun' dealt with Hannibal's well-worn theme of family, '...And The Woman Clothed In the Sun' explores another one of Hannibal's familiar themes: perception versus reality. But this episode differed from the others. While other seasons, specifically the first, looked at how the world perceived characters like Hannibal, based around how he presented himself to the world, 'And The Woman Clothed In The Sun', looks at how characters perceive themselves and how that projection is, in turn, what others see. The episode largely ignores many characters to focus on the self-perception of both Francis Dolarhyde (with an assist from Hannibal) and Will (with an assist from Bedelia)."

Alan Sepinwall of HitFix wrote, "Reba touching the tiger is my favorite scene in 'Manhunter', if not my favorite Michael Mann-directed scene, period, so the version here with these incarnations of Reba and Francis had a lot to live up to. Fortunately, this one didn't disappoint, as both Rutina Wesley and Richard Armitage conveyed the overwhelming emotions both were feeling in this unusual moment." Mark Rozeman of Paste gave the episode a 9.8 out of 10 and wrote, "In the grand scheme of things, '...And the Woman Clothed in Sun' serves as yet another hour-long building block, wherein relationships are built up and pieces put into place that will pay off down the line. What makes this more satisfying than last week's entry, however, is both the innate power at play in the execution of the Red Dragon sequences and the way in which the show augments the episode with the crazy non-book material." Jeff Stone of IndieWire gave the episode an "A" and wrote, "I thought we might make it through this episode without anything too crazy, but that's what I get for underestimating Hannibal. It's not enough that Bedelia reaches down Neal's throat much further than any doctor would recommend, we also get an icky internal shot of her hand wandering down his windpipe. Don't mess with the tiger."

Brian Moylan of The Guardian wrote, "The damage, however, was done and Will has seen Francis' face, so it's only a matter of time before he can spiral back to who Francis really is and catch the killer in 11 days, before he kills again. Or three episodes, when the series ends for good." Keith Staskiewicz of Entertainment Weekly wrote, "Will similarly has his prey served up to him on a silver platter. He just happens to cross paths with Dolarhyde in the elevator and even though he's got a full stomach of proto-Romantic art, Will gets thrown around like a ragdoll. The Dragon makes his escape, but he's been seen. And not in the way he wanted." Chuck Bowen of Slant Magazine wrote, "'And the Woman Clothed in Sun' is explicitly taken with Hannibal's great theme: 'reality' as a terrifyingly fluid and elastic realm, dictated by the conditions of the fragile mind. The most taken-for-granted elements of our lives, events that we think just 'happened' to us, can be revealed to have been actively initiated by us without our conscious knowing, and can mean nothing that we initially take them to mean."

Greg Cwik of Vulture gave the episode a 3 star rating out of 5 and wrote, "While adequately crafted and replete with keen performances, particularly Richard Armitage's tortured turn as Dolarhyde, 'And the Woman Clothed in Sun' is probably the least memorable episode of the season. Not much happens, and what does happen is rendered forgettable by director Guillermo Navarro, who helmed Contorno, my least favorite episode of the season so far. Writer Don Mancini has a gleefully perverse sense of humor that fits Hannibal like a blood-splattered glove, but Navarro lacks a distinctive style and can't seem to imbue any mystery or meaning into his imagery. And there are a handful of scenes that should've been chilling in this episode." Kayti Burt of Den of Geek gave the episode a 3 star rating out of 5 and wrote, "Hannibal delivers its second somewhat scattered episode in a row with 'And the Woman Clothed in the Sun'. This episode meandered, but not in the hypnotically compelling way Hannibal so often pulls off. It is a fine line, perhaps one dependent on novelty. Here, the novelty has worn off." Nick McHatton of TV Fanatic gave the episode a 4 star rating out of 5 and wrote, "Another excellent episode, with strong performances by EVERYONE, and with a great look into the lives of Francis Dolarhyde and Bedelia Du Maurier."

Emma Dibdin of Digital Spy wrote, "For the first time in Hannibal history, we have an episode in which neither Hannibal Lecter nor Will Graham are the protagonist. That role is occupied very distinctly by Francis Dolarhyde, who is at various moments throughout '... And The Woman Clothed in Sun' paralleled with both Hannibal and Will, emerging as a kind of twisted composite of both men." Adam Lehrer of Forbes wrote, "...'And the Woman Clothed in Sun' uses awareness of self and awareness of others as a springboard to show us the essential differences in Will and Francis Dolarhyde's characters. In both of their cases, Hannibal acts as the unfettered id, seeking to bring out the true monster in both men. But, Will isn't a monster. Will was lost at the beginning of the season, but as the years have passed he has realized that Hannibal is essentially wrong about him. Bedelia, in this episode, tells Will that she sees his compassion, and it is the compassion that drives him. She represents all the people in Will's life, other than Hannibal Lecter, that see his goodness. And in Will's case, that is the correct assessment. He needed to be reminded of this fact before squaring off with Hannibal to take down Dolarhyde."
