= Hannibal Rising =

2006 novel by Thomas Harris

- First edition cover
- Author: Thomas Harris
- Language: English
- Series: Hannibal Lecter
- Genre: Thriller, horror, psychological thriller
- Publisher: Delacorte Press
- Publication date: 5 December 2006
- Publication place: United States
- Media type: Print (Hardback)
- Pages: 323
- ISBN: 0-385-33941-0
- OCLC: 82287375
- Preceded by: Hannibal

Hannibal Rising is a psychological horror novel by American author Thomas Harris, published in 2006. It is the fourth and final novel in Harris's series and the first novel in chronological order of the novels centered around Dr. Hannibal Lecter, serving as a prequel to his three previous books. The novel was released with an initial printing of at least 1.5 million copies and met with a mixed critical response. Audiobook versions have also been released, with Harris reading the text. The novel was adapted, with a script by Harris himself, into a film of the same name in 2007. Producer Dino De Laurentiis implied around the time of the novel's release that he had coerced Harris into writing it under threat of losing control over the Hannibal Lecter character, accounting for the perceived diminished quality from Harris' previous books.

== Plot ==
Opening in Lithuania during 1941, Hannibal Lecter is eight years old and living in a castle with his parents and sister, Mischa. With the castle located near the eastern front of World War II, the Lecter family escapes to their lodge to elude the advancing German troops. With the castle abandoned, it is soon raided by Germans and civilians aiding them, their hidden art collection being among the stolen loot. Three years later, an advancing Soviet tank stops at the Lecter family's lodge looking for water, only to be bombed by a German Stuka, the explosion killing all but the children. Surviving in the lodge, Hannibal and Mischa are captured when six deserters appear: Vladis Grutas, Zigmas Milko, Bronys Grentz, Enrikas Dortlich, Petras Kolnas and Kazys Porvik. Storming and looting the lodge, they lock the Lecters in the barn. Running low on supplies, the soldiers soon take Mischa; realizing they intend to cannibalize her, Hannibal tries to stop them, only to have his arm broken before he blacks out.

Hannibal is later spotted by a Soviet tank crew, wearing shackles and rendered mute. Returned to Lecter Castle, now a Soviet orphanage, Hannibal is found to be irreparably traumatized by the ordeal. Removed from the orphanage by his uncle Robert Lecter, Hannibal goes to live with him in France with his aunt, Lady Murasaki. Visiting a marketplace with his aunt, Lecter assaults butcher Paul Momund when he insults Murasaki. Count Lecter, learning of the slight against his wife, violently confronts the butcher and collapses and subsequently dies from a heart attack. Losing most of the Count's estate to death duties, Lecter and Murasaki move across France, and Lecter flourishes as a medical student, assisting by preparing cadavers for lessons.

Locating Momund the butcher, Lecter murders him for his actions, eviscerating and beheading him before eating his cheeks. Suspected by Inspector Popil, Lecter escapes suspicion when Murasaki falsifies evidence, suggesting Momund's death was political. Using sodium thiopental to recall the lodge, Lecter remembers Mischa's murder and her killer's faces, and that the lodge was shelled; the building burning and soldiers fleeing, Lecter was freed by Porvik, who was then crushed by falling debris. Working with Popil to recover his family's stolen art, Lecter attends a recovered art exhibition with Murasaki, and speaks with one of Grutas' men selling the art. Afraid he will uncover their identities, Grutas sends Dortlich to murder him.

Returning to the dilapidated lodge, Lecter searches the ruins and finds a bag of buried loot, which also contains the hidden dogtags of his captors. Attacked by Dortlich, Lecter strikes him with his shovel, and ties him to a tree stump. Noosed to a horse, Dortlich confirms Grentz relocated to Canada, and that Kolnas owns a restaurant in Fontainebleau; despite his pleas, Lecter uses the horse to tear off Dortlich's head. Returning to France, Lecter is kissed by Murasaki, who insists that he promise to stop killing and to co-operate with Popil; Lecter responds that he already promised revenge for Mischa, and leaves. Lecter continues his studies only to be stalked during his night-shift by Milko. Outwitting Milko and drugging him, Lecter interrogates him for information on Grutas, before drowning him in an embalming tank and incinerating his remains.

Eating at Kolnas's restaurant, Lecter notices his daughter is wearing Mischa's stolen bracelet. Entering Grutas's property, Hannibal sets an improvised bomb and confronts him as he bathes, only to be interrupted by Grutas's guards. As Lecter is about to be killed, his bomb detonates and cuts the power, allowing him to wound the guards and escape in the chaos. Returning to Murasaki's home, Lecter receives a call from Grutas, who threatens to kill her unless he surrenders; overhearing ortolans singing in the background of the phone call, Lecter breaks into Kolnas's home, and then heads to his restaurant. Lecter shows he took Mischa's bracelet from his daughter and, in exchange for information, offers to spare Kolnas and free his family. Giving up the location of Grutas's houseboat, Kolnas then realizes Lecter was lying about holding his family. Attacked by Kolnas, Lecter fatally stabs him through the head with a tantō.

Finding and reaching the boat, Lecter sneaks aboard but is wounded by the captain. Killing the guards and captain, Lecter rushes to save Murasaki, only to be shot in the back by Grutas, who boasts while molesting a bound Murasaki. Lecter removes his tantō, dimpled by Grutas's bullet, and uses it to cut both of Grutas's Achilles tendons. With Grutas disarmed, Murasaki begs Lecter to spare him for Popil, only for Grutas to mock him. Taunting that Lecter drank broth made from Mischa, he suggests Lecter kills only to continue lying to himself; enraged, Lecter carves several "M"s into Grutas, fatally wounding him. Horrified by Lecter, Murasaki declares there is nothing human left inside him to love, and dives overboard. Detonating the houseboat with an improvised explosive, Lecter flees the scene.

Arrested by Popil, Lecter is soon freed when popular support for his dispatch of war criminals combines with a lack of hard evidence. Lecter meets with Murasaki, and they say their goodbyes and part. Offered a residency at Johns Hopkins Hospital in Baltimore, Maryland, Lecter heads overseas to North America, stopping briefly to visit bar-owner Grentz in Quebec, Canada.

== Development ==
The February 22, 2007 issue of Entertainment Weekly features a quote that suggests that the only reason Thomas Harris wrote the story was out of the fear that a Lecter prequel/origin story would inevitably be written without his involvement. Hannibal Rising film producer Dino De Laurentiis said "I say to Thomas, 'If you don't do [the prequel], I will do it with someone else... I don't want to lose this franchise. And the audience wants it...' He said, 'No. I'm sorry.' And I said, 'I will do it with somebody else.' And then he said, 'Let me think about it. I will come up with an idea.'"
