= Jeff Vlaming =

American television writer and producer (died 2023)

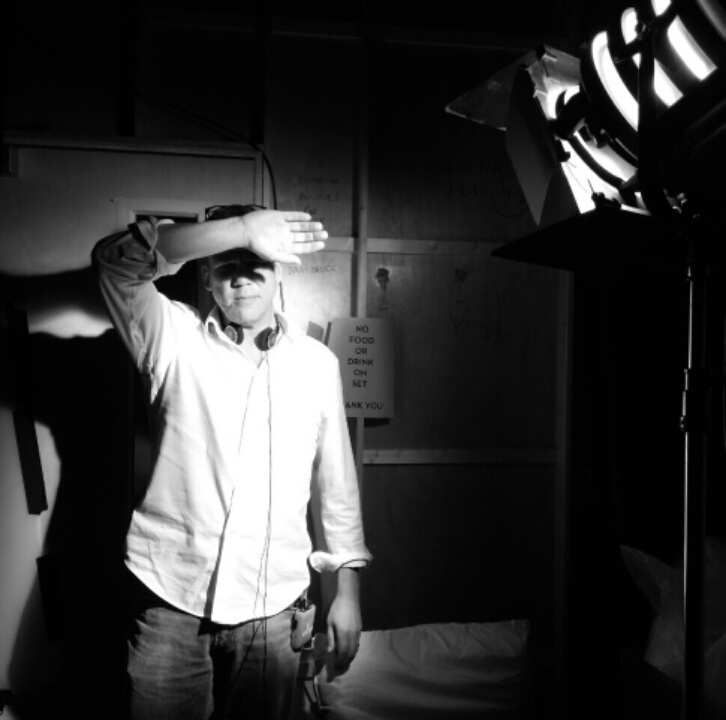
- Vlaming in 2016
- Born: 1959/1960; Edina, Minnesota, U.S.
- Died: January 30, 2023 (aged 63); Pasadena, California, U.S.
- Occupations: Writer, producer
- Known for: The X-Files, Xena: Warrior Princess, Battlestar Galactica

Jeff Vlaming (1959/1960 – January 30, 2023) was an American television writer and producer. He worked on numerous series throughout the 1990s, 2000s and 2010s, including The X-Files, Xena: Warrior Princess, Battlestar Galactica, Northern Exposure, NCIS, Numb3rs, Fringe, Teen Wolf, the NBC series Hannibal, the Cinemax series Outcast, and CW's The 100.

== Early life ==
Vlaming came to Los Angeles, California from Minneapolis, Minnesota, where he had worked as an advertising art director. In 1992, he sold a freelance script to the CBS series Northern Exposure then in its third season and joined the writing staff the following season.

== Career ==
In 1994, Vlaming moved to the USA series Weird Science where he wrote 13 episodes, some of which starred comedian Jake Johansen and B-movie star Bruce Campbell. Also during that time Vlaming wrote an episode for the series Catwalk and The Adventures of Brisco County, Jr..

In Fall 1995, he joined the writing staff for the third season of the FOX drama The X-Files. From there he wrote on the last season of ABC's Lois & Clark, the WB series Rescue 77, and the FOX reality series Murder in Small Town X.

In 2000, Vlaming moved to New York City to write for the Glen Gordon Caron series FLinG. Though the romantic mystery series never aired, Vlaming's episode starred monologist Spalding Gray. Once back in Los Angeles, Vlaming was a writer-producer on the FOX series Keen Eddie and CBS's NCIS followed by USA's American remake of the English crime drama Touching Evil.

After writing three scripts for SyFy's Battlestar Galactica, Vlaming joined the CW series Reaper as a supervising producer for its two-year stint.

In 2009, he joined the staff second season of the FOX science-fiction series Fringe as a writer and supervising producer. Episodes he contributed to include: "Earthling" (co-written by show-runner J.H. Wyman), "What Lies Below", and what many fans considered the series' preeminent episode, "White Tulip" (co-written with Wyman).

His freelance episode of Stargate Universe, "Human" received a Gemini Award for series star Robert Carlyle. In 2011, Vlaming was on MTV's reimagining of Teen Wolf as a co-executive producer and writer.

After two seasons as a co-executive producer on the NBC series Hannibal, Vlaming was a co-executive producer on the Cinemax series Outcast based on the comic book series by Robert Kirkman (creator of The Walking Dead).

Jeff Vlaming was a writer and executive producer for the final three seasons of the Jason Rothenberg CW series The 100 and was writer/executive producer on JH Wyman's NBC series Debris. He was also part of the writing/creative team behind Microsoft's Xbox One game Quantum Break.

In October 2022, Vlaming completed 12 0'Clock Somewhere, a full-color graphic novel which he both wrote and illustrated. The 112-page work is a synthesis of disparate genres—noir, detective fiction, horror—and the milieu of 1930's Los Angeles, one that parallels the discord we find all around us today.

He also maintained a stream of daily doodles, some related to his TV work, on Twitter at @jvlamingwriter.

== Death ==
Vlaming died on January 30, 2023, from cancer at the age of 63.
