= Hannibal (Harris novel) =

1999 novel by Thomas Harris

- First edition cover
- Author: Thomas Harris
- Cover artist: Craig DeCamps
- Language: English
- Series: Hannibal Lecter
- Genre: Thriller, horror, gothic, crime
- Publisher: Delacorte Press
- Publication date: 8 June 1999
- Publication place: United States
- Media type: Print (Hardback and Paperback)
- Pages: 484 (first edition, hardback)
- ISBN: 0-385-29929-X (first edition, hardback)
- OCLC: 41315462
- Preceded by: The Silence of the Lambs
- Followed by: Hannibal Rising

Hannibal is a psychological horror crime thriller novel by American author Thomas Harris, published in 1999. It is the third in his series featuring Dr. Hannibal Lecter, the fourth and final novel in the chronological order of his novels about Lecter and the second to feature FBI Special Agent Clarice Starling. The novel takes place seven years after the events of The Silence of the Lambs and deals with the intended revenge of one of Lecter's victims.

It was adapted as a film of the same name in 2001, directed by Ridley Scott. Elements of the novel were incorporated into the second season of the NBC television series Hannibal, while the show's third season adapted the plot of the novel.

== Synopsis ==
Seven years after the Buffalo Bill case, FBI agent Clarice Starling and her friend John Brigham participate in an undercover raid to arrest a wanted meth dealer. The raid goes poorly, Brigham is killed, and Starling is forced to shoot the dealer while she is holding a baby.

Corrupt Justice Department official Paul Krendler, who resents Starling for her success and for rejecting his sexual advances, vindictively uses the resulting scandal to threaten her with suspension, which her mentor Jack Crawford, now in ill health, cannot stop. Fugitive serial killer Hannibal Lecter sends her a letter of condolence and offers therapeutic techniques to help her break down the trauma of the experience.

Eager to exploit her connection to Lecter, the FBI tasks Starling with apprehending him. She meets with Barney, a former orderly of Baltimore State Hospital for the Criminally Insane, who has kept a number of Lecter's personal belongings and medical files to sell as memorabilia. When Barney asks Starling if she ever feared that Lecter might come after her, she replies that she does not, as "he said he wouldn't".

The FBI's pursuit of Lecter is secretly influenced by Mason Verger, a wealthy, sadistic pedophile who is one of Lecter's few surviving victims. During a therapy session, Lecter drugged Verger, convinced him to cut off his own face, which Lecter fed to Verger's dogs, before breaking his neck and paralyzing him. Verger now plans to get revenge by feeding Lecter to specially bred wild boars, using Starling's investigation to confirm information he has received about Lecter's whereabouts. He is aided by Krendler, who leaks information in exchange for funds for his Congress campaign.

In Florence, disgraced Italian detective Rinaldo Pazzi meets museum curator Dr. Fell and recognizes him as Hannibal Lecter. Rather than arresting him, he pursues Lecter in the interests of collecting Verger's bounty, enlisting the help of a romani pickpocket to collect an item with Lecter's fingerprint. Lecter kills the pickpocket, but Pazzi is able to secure the proof he needs. However, before he can be captured, Lecter disembowels and hangs Pazzi from a window in the Palazzo Vecchio in reference to the lynchings of the Pazzi conspirators. After killing one of Verger's men, Lecter escapes to the United States to take his revenge on Verger.

As Lecter settles in to an opulent Maryland house rented under a false identity, he reflects on his childhood in Lithuania and the death of his younger sister, Mischa. The two were orphaned during World War II, and a group of deserters killed and ate Mischa, something that haunts Lecter. Noting a resemblance between Mischa and Starling, he grows fixated on Starling. He murders and butchers a deer poacher to alert Starling to his presence in the country.

Barney is brought in to work for Verger due to his knowledge of Lecter. He befriends Verger's sister and bodyguard Margot, a lesbian bodybuilder whom Verger molested and raped as a child. Her father disinherited her after learning of her homosexuality. Margot, who is infertile, tells him that she works for her brother because she needs Mason's sperm to have a child with her partner, Judy Ingram, and inherit the Verger family fortune. She attempts to convince Barney to help her collect Mason's sperm while he is asleep and then help her kill him, and when he refuses, she fires him.

Verger and Krendler determine that if Starling is put in danger, Lecter will be drawn out to protect her, and they plant evidence that implies Starling attempted to contact Lecter and warn him of Pazzi's pursuit. She is suspended, and Verger begins surveilling her, sure that Lecter will attempt to make contact. When he does, Verger's men capture Lecter, and Starling, unable to convince her supervisor at the FBI to investigate, pursues them on her own. Lecter is brought to Verger's farm, where he unsuccessfully attempts to convince Margot to release him and murder her brother herself, offering to take the blame for her if she does. When Starling catches up to Lecter, she is able to cut him free before succumbing to tranquilizer darts shot by one of Verger's men. The boars are unleashed by Lecter; they feed on the henchmen that Starling had already incapacitated but ignore Lecter when they smell no fear on him. In the confusion, Lecter carries the unconscious Starling to safety and escapes. At the same time, Margot obtains Mason's sperm by sodomizing him with a cattle prod and murders him by shoving his pet moray eel into his mouth. Remembering Lecter's offer to take the blame, she leaves a piece of Lecter's scalp at the scene.

Lecter brings Starling to his home in Maryland and tends to her wounds. Over the course of a few days, using a regimen of psychotropic drugs, hypnosis and cognitive therapy, he attempts to help Starling heal from her childhood trauma and her pent-up anger at the injustices of the world. His therapy culminates in a session where he presents her with her father's exhumed skeleton, allowing her to confront the displaced anger and abandonment issues stemming from his murder. Soon after, Lecter captures Krendler with Margot Verger's help and arranges an extravagant dinner for himself and Starling. After allowing Starling, again under the influence of drugs, to confront Krendler, Lecter lobotomizes him at the table, filets and cooks his prefrontal cortex and shares the meal with Starling, then kills Krendler with a crossbow. After the dinner, Starling confronts Lecter on his goal to replace her personality with that of his sister Mischa, asking him if Mischa's personality could replace his instead, saying that she knows that he "would never deny her", and then asking him if Mischa couldn't live in his memories as he had told her that her father could live in hers. She partially undresses and offers one of her breasts to Lecter. Lecter goes down on a knee before Starling, accepting her offer. The two become lovers and disappear together.

Three years later, Barney, who has received a sizable bribe from Margot in exchange for his silence, is travelling the world and attends an opera at the Teatro Colón in Buenos Aires. He spots Lecter and Starling in the crowd; fearing for his life, he flees the city.

Lecter and Starling are seen living together in an "exquisite" Beaux Arts mansion, where they employ servants and engage in activities such as learning new languages, dancing together and building their own respective memory palaces. Moreover, the reader is told that "Sex is a splendid structure they add to every day", that the psychoactive drugs "have had no part in their lives for a long time", and that Lecter is "satisfied" with the fact that Mischa cannot return. The novel closes as the couple dance together on their terrace.

== Reception ==
The ending was controversial and the reaction to the novel was mixed. Robert McCrum, writing in The Guardian, called it "the exquisite satisfaction of a truly great melodrama." Author Stephen King, a fan of the series, has said that he considers Hannibal to be better than Red Dragon and The Silence of the Lambs, and to be one of the two most frightening popular novels of modern times, the other being The Exorcist.

Charles de Lint criticized Hannibal as a huge disappointment, citing "its disturbing subtexts, which... set [Lecter] up as a sympathetic character," and Harris's "twisting [Starling] so out of character simply to provide a 'shock' ending." Martin Amis was extremely critical of the book (having been impressed by Harris's earlier Lecter novels) and wrote that "Harris has become a serial murderer of English sentences, and Hannibal is a necropolis of prose."

The first printing of Hannibal sold 1.3 million copies. It was the second highest bestselling novel in 1999.

== Adaptations ==
- A film adaptation was released in 2001 through MGM and Universal Studios. The film was directed by Ridley Scott, and starred Anthony Hopkins (the only returning actor from The Silence of the Lambs, other than Frankie Faison) as Lecter, Julianne Moore as Starling, Gary Oldman as Verger, and Giancarlo Giannini as Pazzi. David Mamet and Steven Zaillian wrote the screenplay for the film.
- Elements of the novel are featured in the NBC television series Hannibal, which features Mads Mikkelsen as Lecter, and Hugh Dancy as Red Dragon character Will Graham, who appears as the protagonist instead of Starling. The second half of the series' second season features Katharine Isabelle as Margot Verger and Michael Pitt as Mason Verger, and shows how Verger was disfigured by Lecter. The plot of the novel is adapted into the first half of the series' third season, with Isabelle returning as Margot, Joe Anderson as Verger, Fortunato Cerlino as Pazzi and Glenn Fleshler as Cordell Doemling.
