= 1975 in the United States =

- Decades: 1950s; 1960s; 1970s; 1980s; 1990s
- See also: History of the United States (1964–1980); Timeline of United States history (1970–1989); List of years in the United States

Events from the year 1975 in the United States.

== Incumbents ==
=== Federal government ===
- President: Gerald Ford (R-Michigan)
- Vice President: Nelson Rockefeller (R-New York)
- Chief Justice: Warren E. Burger (Virginia)
- Speaker of the House of Representatives: Carl Albert (D-Oklahoma)
- Senate Majority Leader: Mike Mansfield (D-Montana)
- Congress: 93rd (until January 3), 94th (starting January 3)

==== State governments ====
Governors and lieutenant governors

=== Governors ===
- Governor of Alabama: George Wallace (Democratic)
- Governor of Alaska: Jay Hammond (Republican)
- Governor of Arizona: Jack Richard Williams (Republican) (until January 6), Raul Hector Castro (Democratic) (starting January 6)
- Governor of Arkansas:
  - until January 3: Dale Bumpers (Democratic)
  - January 3–14: Bob C. Riley (Democratic)
  - starting January 14: David Pryor (Democratic)
- Governor of California: Ronald Reagan (Republican) (until January 6), Jerry Brown (Democratic) (starting January 6)
- Governor of Colorado: John David Vanderhoof (Republican) (until January 14), Richard Lamm (Democratic) (starting January 14)
- Governor of Connecticut: Thomas J. Meskill (Republican) (until January 6), Ella T. Grasso (Democratic) (starting January 6)
- Governor of Delaware: Sherman W. Tribbitt (Democratic)
- Governor of Florida: Reubin Askew (Democratic)
- Governor of Georgia: Jimmy Carter (Democratic) (until January 14), George Busbee (Democratic) (starting January 14)
- Governor of Hawaii: George Ariyoshi (Democratic)
- Governor of Idaho: Cecil D. Andrus (Democratic)
- Governor of Illinois: Dan Walker (Democratic)
- Governor of Indiana: Otis R. Bowen (Republican)
- Governor of Iowa: Robert D. Ray (Republican)
- Governor of Kansas: Robert Docking (Democratic) (until January 13), Robert F. Bennett (Republican) (starting January 13)
- Governor of Kentucky: Julian M. Carroll (Democratic)
- Governor of Louisiana: Edwin W. Edwards (Democratic)
- Governor of Maine: Kenneth M. Curtis (Democratic) (until January 2), James B. Longley (Independent) (starting January 2)
- Governor of Maryland: Marvin Mandel (Democratic)
- Governor of Massachusetts: Francis W. Sargent (Republican) (until January 2), Michael Dukakis (Democratic) (starting January 2)
- Governor of Michigan: William Milliken (Republican)
- Governor of Minnesota: Wendell R. Anderson (Democratic)
- Governor of Mississippi: Bill Waller (Democratic)
- Governor of Missouri: Kit Bond (Republican)
- Governor of Montana: Thomas Lee Judge (Democratic)
- Governor of Nebraska: J. James Exon (Democratic)
- Governor of Nevada: Mike O'Callaghan (Democratic)
- Governor of New Hampshire: Meldrim Thomson, Jr. (Republican)
- Governor of New Jersey: Brendan Byrne (Democratic)
- Governor of New Mexico: Bruce King (Democratic) (until January 1), Jerry Apodaca (Democratic) (starting January 1)
- Governor of New York: Hugh Carey (Democratic) (starting January 1)
- Governor of North Carolina: James E. Holshouser, Jr. (Republican)
- Governor of North Dakota: Arthur A. Link (Democratic)
- Governor of Ohio: John J. Gilligan (Democratic) (until January 13), Jim Rhodes (Republican) (starting January 13)
- Governor of Oklahoma: David Hall (Democratic) (until January 13), David L. Boren (Democratic) (starting January 13)
- Governor of Oregon: Tom McCall (Republican) (until January 13), Robert W. Straub (Democratic) (starting January 13)
- Governor of Pennsylvania: Milton Shapp (Democratic)
- Governor of Rhode Island: Philip W. Noel (Democratic)
- Governor of South Carolina: John C. West (Democratic) (until January 21), James B. Edwards (Republican) (starting January 21)
- Governor of South Dakota: Richard F. Kneip (Democratic)
- Governor of Tennessee: Winfield Dunn (Republican) (until January 18), Ray Blanton (Democratic) (starting January 18)
- Governor of Texas: Dolph Briscoe (Democratic)
- Governor of Utah: Cal Rampton (Democratic)
- Governor of Vermont: Thomas P. Salmon (Democratic)
- Governor of Virginia: Mills E. Godwin, Jr. (Republican)
- Governor of Washington: Daniel J. Evans (Republican)
- Governor of West Virginia: Arch A. Moore, Jr. (Republican)
- Governor of Wisconsin: Patrick J. Lucey (Democratic)
- Governor of Wyoming: Stanley K. Hathaway (Republican) (until January 6), Edgar J. Herschler (Democratic) (starting January 6)

=== Lieutenant governors ===
- Lieutenant Governor of Alabama: Jere Beasley (Democratic)
- Lieutenant Governor of Alaska: Lowell Thomas, Jr. (Republican)
- Lieutenant Governor of Arkansas: Bob C. Riley (Democratic) (until January 14), Joe Purcell (Democratic) (starting January 14)
- Lieutenant Governor of California: John L. Harmer (Republican) (until January 6), Mervyn M. Dymally (Democratic) (starting January 6)
- Lieutenant Governor of Colorado: Ted L. Strickland (Republican) (until January 14), George L. Brown (Democratic) (starting January 14)
- Lieutenant Governor of Connecticut: Peter L. Cashman (Republican) (until January 8), Robert K. Killian (Democratic) (starting January 8)
- Lieutenant Governor of Delaware: Eugene Bookhammer (Republican)
- Lieutenant Governor of Florida: Thomas Burton Adams, Jr. (Democratic) (until January 7), J.H. Williams (Democratic) (starting January 7)
- Lieutenant Governor of Georgia: Lester Maddox (Democratic) (until January 14), Zell Miller (Democratic) (starting January 14)
- Lieutenant Governor of Hawaii: Nelson Doi (Democratic)
- Lieutenant Governor of Idaho: Jack M. Murphy (Democratic) (until January 6), John V. Evans (Democratic) (starting January 6)
- Lieutenant Governor of Illinois: Neil Hartigan (Democratic)
- Lieutenant Governor of Indiana: Robert D. Orr (Republican)
- Lieutenant Governor of Iowa: Arthur A. Neu (Republican)
- Lieutenant Governor of Kansas: Dave Owen (Republican) (until January 13), Shelby Smith (Republican) (starting January 13)
- Lieutenant Governor of Kentucky: vacant (until December 9), Thelma Stovall (Republican) (starting December 9)
- Lieutenant Governor of Louisiana: Jimmy Fitzmorris (Democratic)
- Lieutenant Governor of Maryland: Blair Lee III (political party unknown)
- Lieutenant Governor of Massachusetts: Donald R. Dwight (Republican) (until January 2), Thomas P. O'Neill III (Democratic) (starting January 2)
- Lieutenant Governor of Michigan: James H. Brickley (Republican) (until month and day unknown), James Damman (Republican) (starting month and day unknown)
- Lieutenant Governor of Minnesota: Rudy Perpich (Democratic)
- Lieutenant Governor of Mississippi: William F. Winter (Democratic)
- Lieutenant Governor of Missouri: William C. Phelps (Republican)
- Lieutenant Governor of Montana: Bill Christiansen (Democratic)
- Lieutenant Governor of Nebraska: Frank Marsh (Republican) (until January 9), Gerald Whelan (Democratic) (starting January 9)
- Lieutenant Governor of Nevada: Harry Reid (Democratic) (until January 5), Robert E. Rose (Democratic) (starting January 5)
- Lieutenant Governor of New Mexico: Roberto Mondragón (Democratic) (until January 1), Robert E. Ferguson (Democratic) (starting January 1)
- Lieutenant Governor of New York: Mary Anne Krupsak (Democratic) (starting January 1)
- Lieutenant Governor of North Carolina: Jim Hunt (Democratic)
- Lieutenant Governor of North Dakota: Wayne G. Sanstead (Democratic)
- Lieutenant Governor of Ohio: John William Brown (Republican) (until January 13), Dick Celeste (Democratic) (starting January 13)
- Lieutenant Governor of Oklahoma: George Nigh (Democratic)
- Lieutenant Governor of Pennsylvania: Ernest P. Kline (Democratic)
- Lieutenant Governor of Rhode Island: J. Joseph Garrahy (Democratic)
- Lieutenant Governor of South Carolina: Earle Morris, Jr. (Democratic) (until January 21), W. Brantley Harvey, Jr. (Democratic) (starting January 21)
- Lieutenant Governor of South Dakota: William Dougherty (Democratic) (until month and day unknown), Harvey L. Wollman (Democratic) (starting month and day unknown)
- Lieutenant Governor of Tennessee: John S. Wilder (Democratic)
- Lieutenant Governor of Texas: William P. Hobby, Jr. (Democratic)
- Lieutenant Governor of Utah: Clyde L. Miller (Democratic) (starting month and day unknown)
- Lieutenant Governor of Vermont: John S. Burgess (Republican) (until month and day unknown), Brian D. Burns (Democratic) (starting month and day unknown)
- Lieutenant Governor of Virginia: John N. Dalton (Republican)
- Lieutenant Governor of Washington: John Cherberg (Democratic)
- Lieutenant Governor of Wisconsin: Martin J. Schreiber (Democratic)

== Events ==
=== January ===
- January – Volkswagen introduces the Golf, its new front-wheel-drive economy car, in the United States and Canada as the Volkswagen Rabbit.
- January 1 – Watergate scandal: John N. Mitchell, H. R. Haldeman and John Ehrlichman are found guilty of the Watergate cover-up.
- January 2 – The Federal Rules of Evidence are approved by the United States Congress.
- January 6
  - AM America makes its television debut on ABC.
  - Wheel of Fortune premieres on NBC.
  - The Indiana Law Enforcement Academy begins operations.
- January 8
  - Ella Grasso becomes Governor of Connecticut, the first woman U.S. governor who did not succeed her husband.
  - President Gerald Ford appoints Vice President Nelson Rockefeller to head a special commission looking into alleged domestic abuses by the CIA.
- January 12 – Super Bowl IX: The Pittsburgh Steelers defeat the Minnesota Vikings 16–6 at Tulane Stadium in New Orleans, Louisiana.
- January 15
  - The Carousel of Progress moves to Walt Disney World from Disneyland.
  - Steel roller coaster Space Mountain (Magic Kingdom) opens at Walt Disney World in Florida, becoming one of the park's most popular attractions into the 21st century.
- January 18 – The United States Atomic Energy Commission is divided between the Energy Research and Development Administration and the Nuclear Regulatory Commission, partly in response to the 1973 oil crisis.
- January 20 – Talent agent Michael Ovitz founds the Creative Artists Agency.
- January 26 – Immaculata University defeats the University of Maryland 80–48 in the first nationally televised women's basketball game in the United States.
- January 28 – Be My Valentine, Charlie Brown premieres on CBS, but did not win the Nielsen Ratings (Rival NBC won that day at the 8PM Hour).
- January 29 – The Weather Underground bombs the U.S. State Department main office in Washington, D.C.

=== February ===
- February 2 – The 7.6 M_{s} Near Islands earthquake hits the Aleutian Islands in Alaska with a maximum Mercalli intensity of IX (Violent), injuring 15.
- February 3 – The New World Liberation Front, a left-wing terrorist group, attacks the Pillar Point Air Force Station, but their pipe bombs fail to ignite their targets, leading to a diesel fuel spill.
- February 13 – Fire breaks out in the World Trade Center.
- February 21 – Watergate scandal: Former United States Attorney General John N. Mitchell, and former White House aides H. R. Haldeman and John Ehrlichman, are sentenced to between 30 months and 8 years in prison.
- February 23 – In response to the energy crisis, daylight saving time commences nearly two months early in the United States.

=== March ===
- March 6 – The Zapruder film of the assassination of John F. Kennedy is shown in motion to a national TV audience for the first time by Robert J. Groden and Dick Gregory.
- March 9 – Construction of the Trans-Alaska Pipeline System begins.
- March 10 – The Rocky Horror Show opens on Broadway in New York City with 4 performances.
- March 19 – The release of Tommy, a musical/drama produced by Ken Russel and Robert Stigwood.
- March 29 – Blow by Blow by Jeff Beck is released. It would become his most successful album in the United States, reaching the top five and selling over one million copies.
- March 30 – James Ruppert murders 11 family members inside his home on Easter Sunday.
- March 31 – In his final game on the sideline, John Wooden coaches UCLA to its 10th national championship in 12 seasons when the Bruins defeat Kentucky 92–85 in the title game at San Diego.

=== April ===
- April 3 – Bobby Fischer refuses to play in a chess match against Anatoly Karpov, giving Karpov the title.
- April 4
  - Vietnam War: The first military Operation Babylift flight, C5A 80218, crashes 27 minutes after takeoff, killing 138 on board; 176 survive the crash.
  - Bill Gates founds Microsoft in Albuquerque, New Mexico.
- April 8 – The 47th Academy Awards ceremony, hosted by Bob Hope, Shirley MacLaine, Sammy Davis Jr. and Frank Sinatra, is held at Dorothy Chandler Pavilion in Los Angeles. Francis Ford Coppola's The Godfather Part II wins six awards (twice as many as its predecessor), including Best Picture and Best Director for Coppola. The sequel is tied with Roman Polanski's Chinatown in receiving 11 nominations. It is the final ceremony aired by NBC.
- April 15 – Karen Ann Quinlan, 21, faints after consuming Quaaludes at a party. She becomes a controversial subject in the right to die movement after her parents sue to have her comatose body removed from life-support. She lives off a feeding tube until 1985.
- April 29 – Operation Frequent Wind – Americans and their allies are evacuated from South Vietnam by helicopter.
- April 30 – Vietnam War: The Fall of Saigon: The Vietnam War ends as Communist forces take Saigon, resulting in mass evacuations of Americans and South Vietnamese. As the capital is taken, South Vietnam surrenders unconditionally.

=== May ===
- May – The unemployment rate peaks at 9.0% ending the Post-War Boom.
- May 5 – The Busch Gardens Williamsburg theme park, originally known as Busch Gardens: The Old Country, opens in Williamsburg, Virginia.
- May 6 – A violent F4 tornado hits the Omaha metropolitan area, killing three and injuring more than 137.
- May 12 – Mayaguez incident: Khmer Rouge forces in Cambodia seize the United States merchant ship SS Mayaguez in international waters.
- May 15 – Mayaguez incident: The American merchant ship Mayaguez, seized by Cambodian forces, is rescued by the U.S. Navy and Marines; 38 Americans are killed.
- May 17 – Elton John's Captain Fantastic and the Brown Dirt Cowboy becomes the first album to enter the US Billboard 200 album chart at Number One.
- May 25
  - The Golden State Warriors win the 1975 NBA basketball championship, defeating the Washington Bullets in a four-game sweep.
  - Indianapolis 500: Bobby Unser wins for a second time in a rain-shorted 174 lap, 435 mile (696 km) race.
- May 27 – In the National Hockey League, The Philadelphia Flyers defeat the Buffalo Sabres 2–0 in game six of the finals to claim their second straight Stanley Cup.
- May 30 – American distance runner Steve Prefontaine dies in a car accident in Eugene, Oregon.

=== June ===
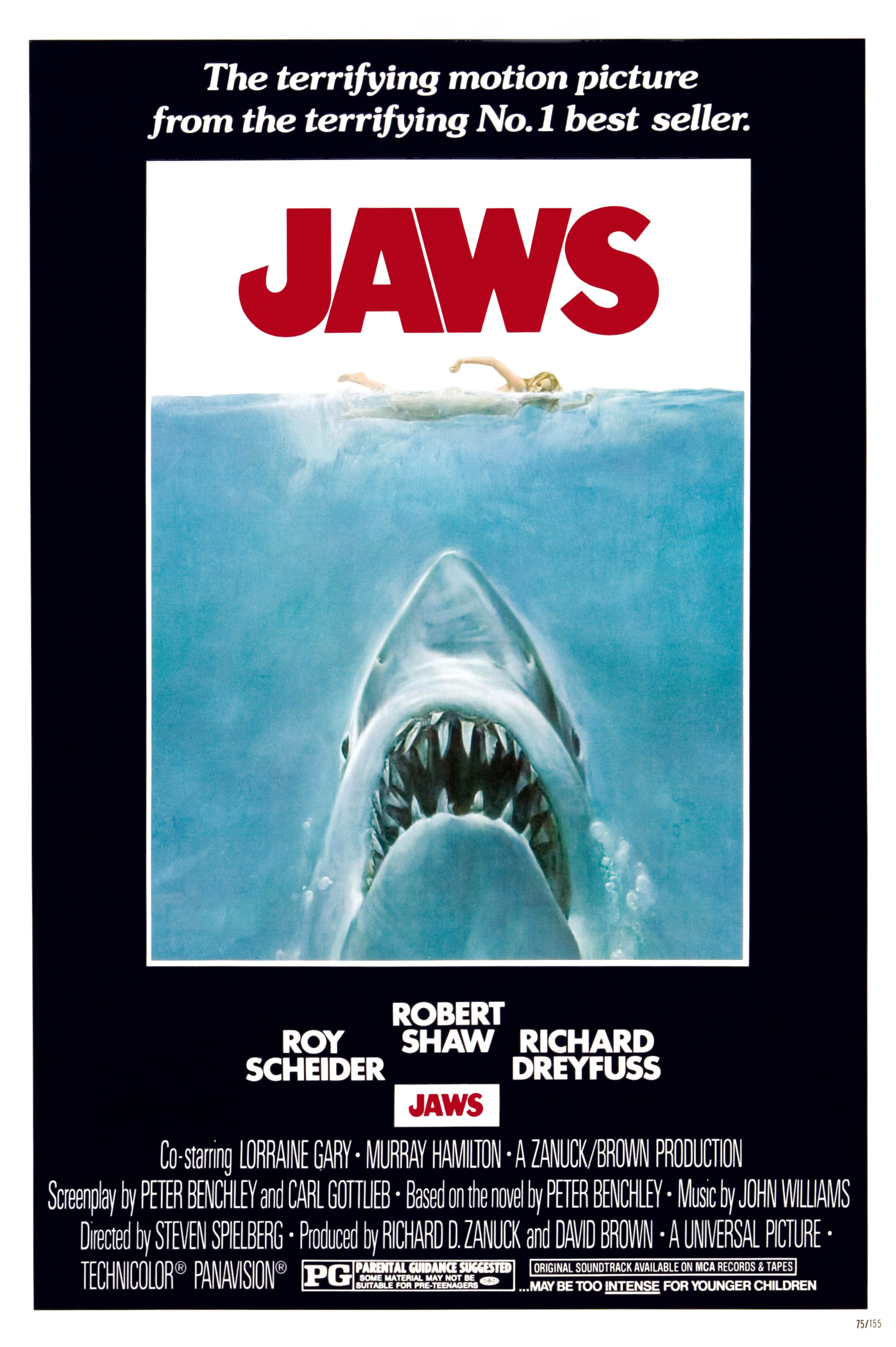

- June 1 – President Ford meets with President Sadat of Egypt for peace talks in the Middle East in Salzburg, Austria, where he famously tumbles on the last steps out of Air Force One.
- June 10 – In Washington, DC, the Rockefeller Commission issues its report on CIA abuses, recommending a joint congressional oversight committee on intelligence.
- June 20 – Universal Pictures releases Steven Spielberg's adaptation of Peter Benchley's bestseller Jaws in 409 cinemas across the United States. The coupling of this broad distribution pattern with the movie's then even rarer national television marketing campaign has yielded a release method virtually unheard-of. Regardless, the film ultimately brings in $123.1 million by the end of its initial run, and is considered to be the first modern blockbuster as a result.
- June 24 – Eastern Airlines Flight 66 crashes in New York City while attempting to land at JFK International Airport from New Orleans due to a microburst, killing 113 of the 124 on board.
- June 26 – Two FBI agents and one AIM member die in a shootout at the Pine Ridge Indian Reservation in South Dakota.

=== July ===
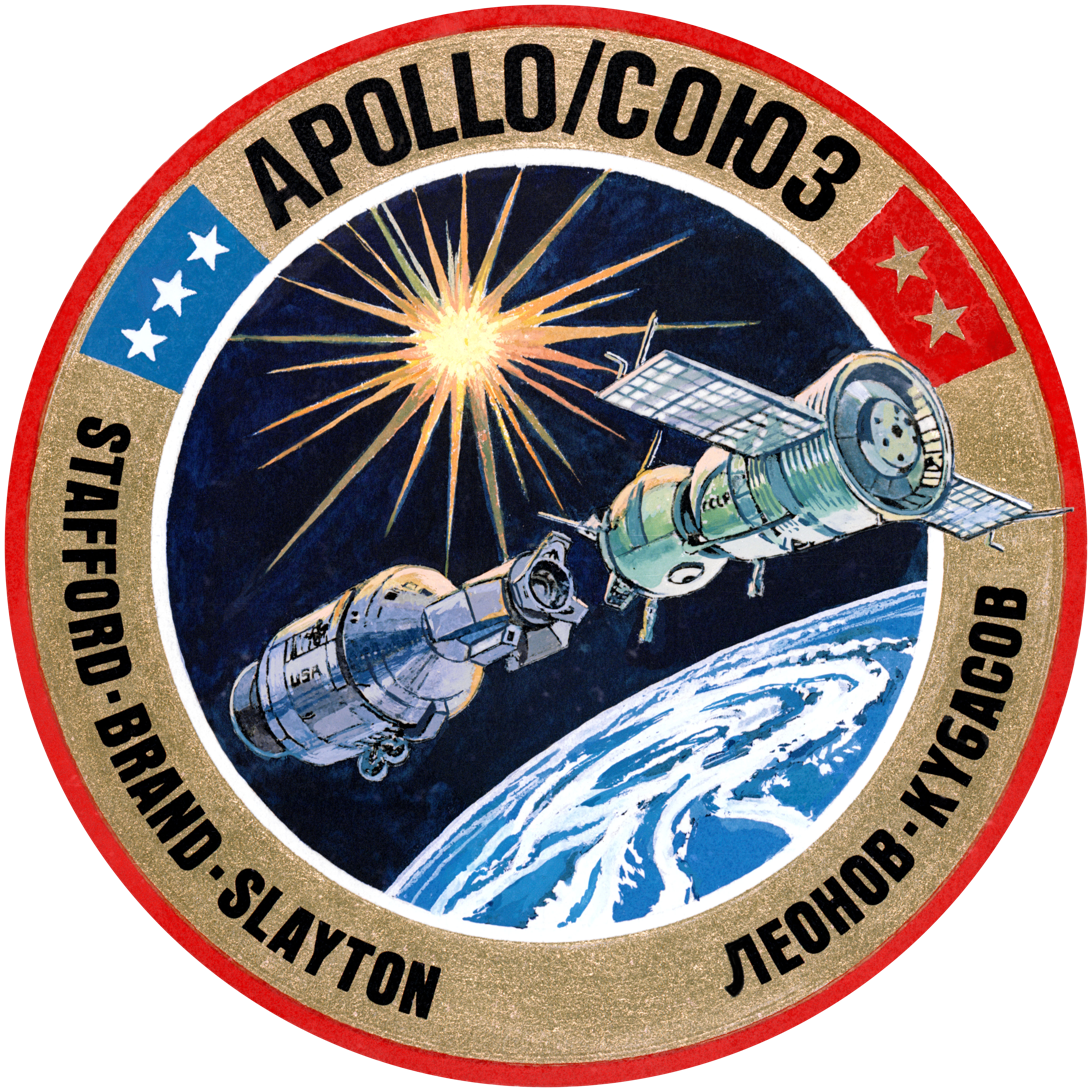
July 17: Apollo–Soyuz Test Project orbital docking

- July 6 – Ruffian, an American champion thoroughbred racehorse breaks down in a match race against Kentucky Derby winner, Foolish Pleasure; she has to be euthanized the following day.
- July 17 – Apollo–Soyuz Test Project: An American Apollo and Soviet Soyuz spacecraft dock in orbit, marking the first such link-up between spacecraft from the two nations. It is also the last Apollo mission and the last crewed U.S. space mission until STS-1 (the first Space Shuttle orbital flight).
- July 22 – Stanley Forman takes the photo Fire Escape Collapse.
- July 25 – A Chorus Line debuts on Broadway
- July 30 – In Detroit, Michigan, Teamsters Union president Jimmy Hoffa is reported missing. He is never found and is declared dead in absentia in 1982.

=== August ===
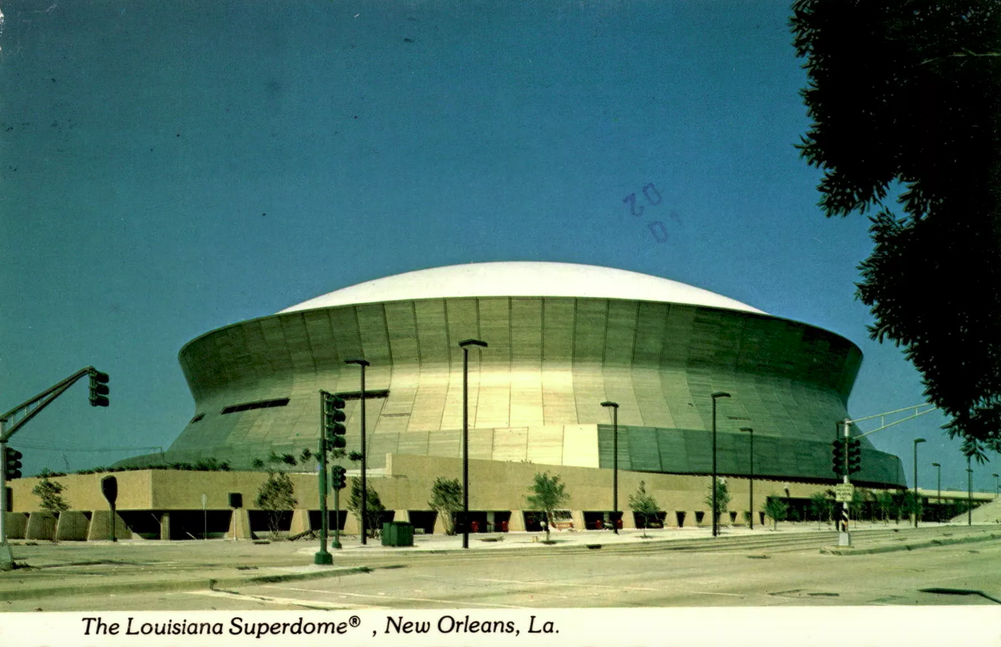
Postcard photo of the newly built Superdome, circa 1975

- August 1 – The 5.7 M_{L} Oroville earthquake affects Butte County, California, with a maximum Mercalli intensity of VIII (Severe), injuring 10 and causing $3 million in damage.
- August 3 – The Louisiana Superdome opens in New Orleans.
- August 5 – President Ford posthumously pardons Robert E. Lee, restoring full rights of citizenship.
- August 7–11 – The Special Olympics World Games take place in Mount Pleasant, Michigan.
- August 8 – Samuel Bronfman II, son of Seagram president Edgar Bronfman, is kidnapped in Purchase, New York. He is rescued after a ransom is paid.
- August 20 – Viking program: NASA launches the Viking 1 planetary probe toward Mars.
- August 25 – Bruce Springsteen's album Born to Run is released.

=== September ===
- September 5 – In Sacramento, California, Lynette Fromme, a follower of jailed cult leader Charles Manson, attempts to assassinate President Gerald Ford, but is thwarted by a Secret Service agent.
- September 9 – Riverfront Coliseum opens in Cincinnati.
- September 14 – Elizabeth Seton is canonized, becoming the first American Roman Catholic saint.
- September 18 – Fugitive Patricia Hearst is captured in San Francisco.
- September 22 – President Gerald Ford survives a second assassination attempt, this time by Sara Jane Moore in San Francisco.

=== October ===
- October 1 – Thrilla in Manila: Muhammad Ali defeats Joe Frazier in a boxing match in Manila, Philippines.
- October 11 – NBC airs the first episode of Saturday Night Live (George Carlin is the first host; Billy Preston and Janis Ian the first musical guests).
- October 21 – 1975 World Series: US baseball team the Boston Red Sox defeat the Cincinnati Reds in Game 6 off Carlton Fisk's 12th-inning home run in one of the most famous World Series games ever played. The following day, the series ends with Game 7 victory by the Reds, in a broadcast that breaks records for a televised sporting event.

=== November ===
- November 3
  - An independent audit of Mattel, one of the United States' largest toy manufacturers, reveals that company officials fabricated press releases and financial information to "maintain the appearance of continued corporate growth".
  - The long-running television game show The Price Is Right expands from 30 minutes to its current hour-long format on CBS.
- November 5 – Travis Walton, a 22-year-old logger, is working in the Apache-Sitgreaves National Forest with six co-workers near Snowflake, Arizona, when he suddenly disappears. Walton is found five days later and says that he has been abducted by extraterrestrial aliens. His book, The Walton Experience (1978), will become the basis for a film, Fire in the Sky (1993).
- November 10 – The bulk carrier Edmund Fitzgerald sinks 15 miles off of Whitefish Point, Michigan, losing all 29 crew on board.
- November 20 – Former California Governor Ronald Reagan enters the race for the 1976 Republican presidential nomination, challenging incumbent President Gerald Ford.
- November 29
  - The name "Micro-soft" (for microcomputer software) is used by Bill Gates in a letter to Paul Allen for the first time (Microsoft becomes a registered trademark on November 26, 1976).
  - While disabled, the submarine tender USS Proteus (AS-19) discharges radioactive coolant water into Apra Harbor, Guam. A Geiger counter at two of the harbor's public beaches shows 100 millirems/hour, 50 times the allowable dose.
  - The 7.4 M_{w} Hawaii earthquake hits several of the Hawaiian Islands with a maximum Mercalli intensity of VIII (Severe), causing two deaths, up to 28 injuries, and a destructive tsunami.

=== December ===
- December 8 – New York City is approved for a bailout of $2.3 billion each year through to 1978 – $6.9 billion total.
- December 18 – The Lutz family moves into 112 Ocean Avenue, Amityville, Long Island, New York, in the United States, only to flee from the house after 28 days, which will go on to inspire the story of The Amityville Horror.
- December 23 – United States Congress passes the Metric Conversion Act which encourages, but does not mandate, metrication in the United States and establishes the Metric Board.
- December 25 – The first Family Express opens in Valparaiso, Indiana.
- December 29 – A bomb explosion at LaGuardia Airport kills 11.

=== Ongoing ===
- Cold War (1947–1991)
- Détente (c. 1969–1979)
- Capital punishment suspended by Furman v. Georgia (1972–1976)
- 1970s energy crisis (1973–1980)
- DOCUMERICA photography project (1972–1977)

== Births ==
=== January ===
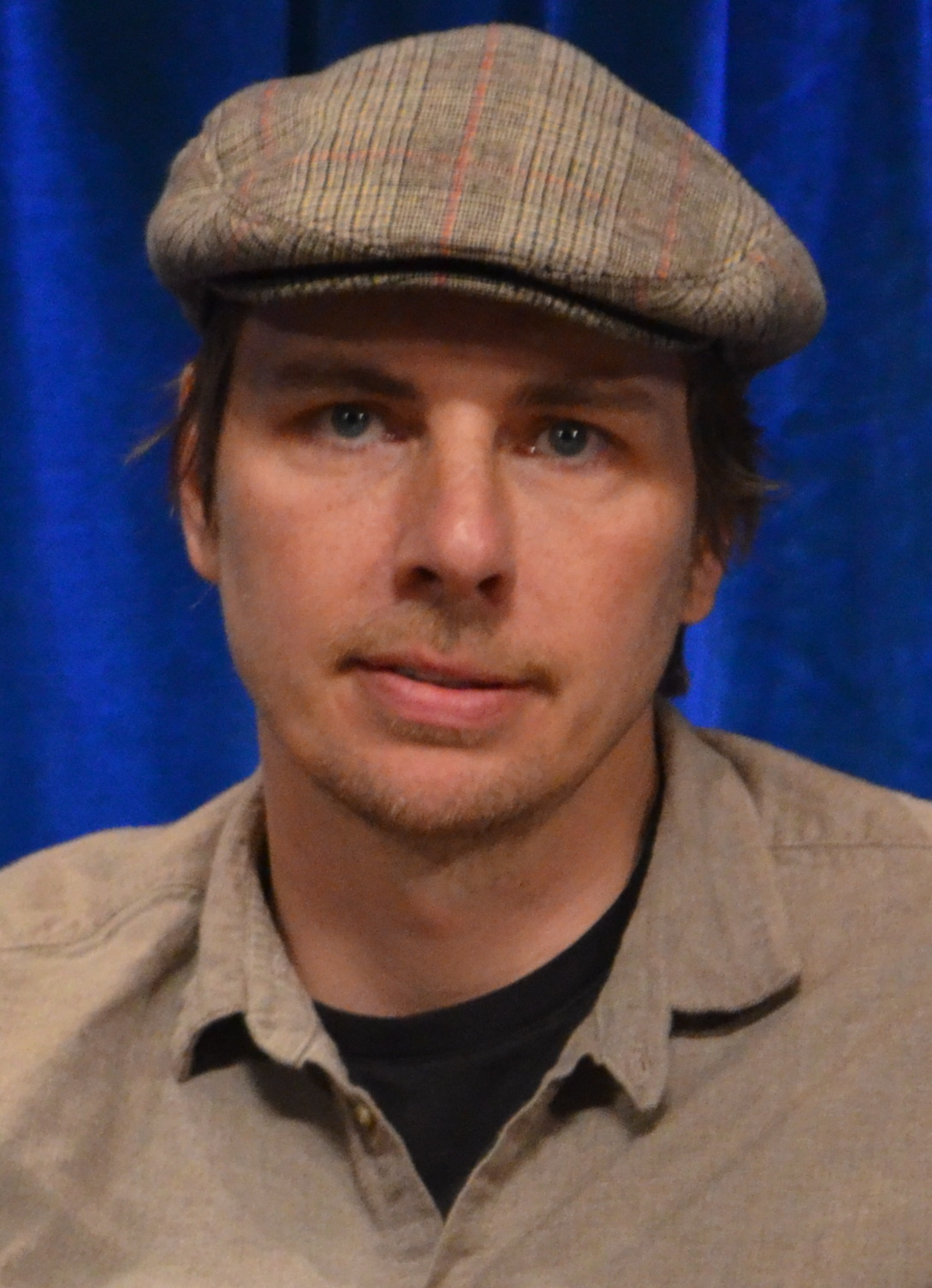
Dax Shepard

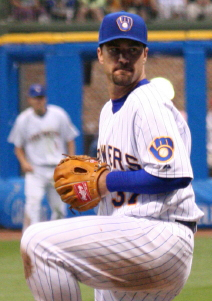
Jeff Suppan

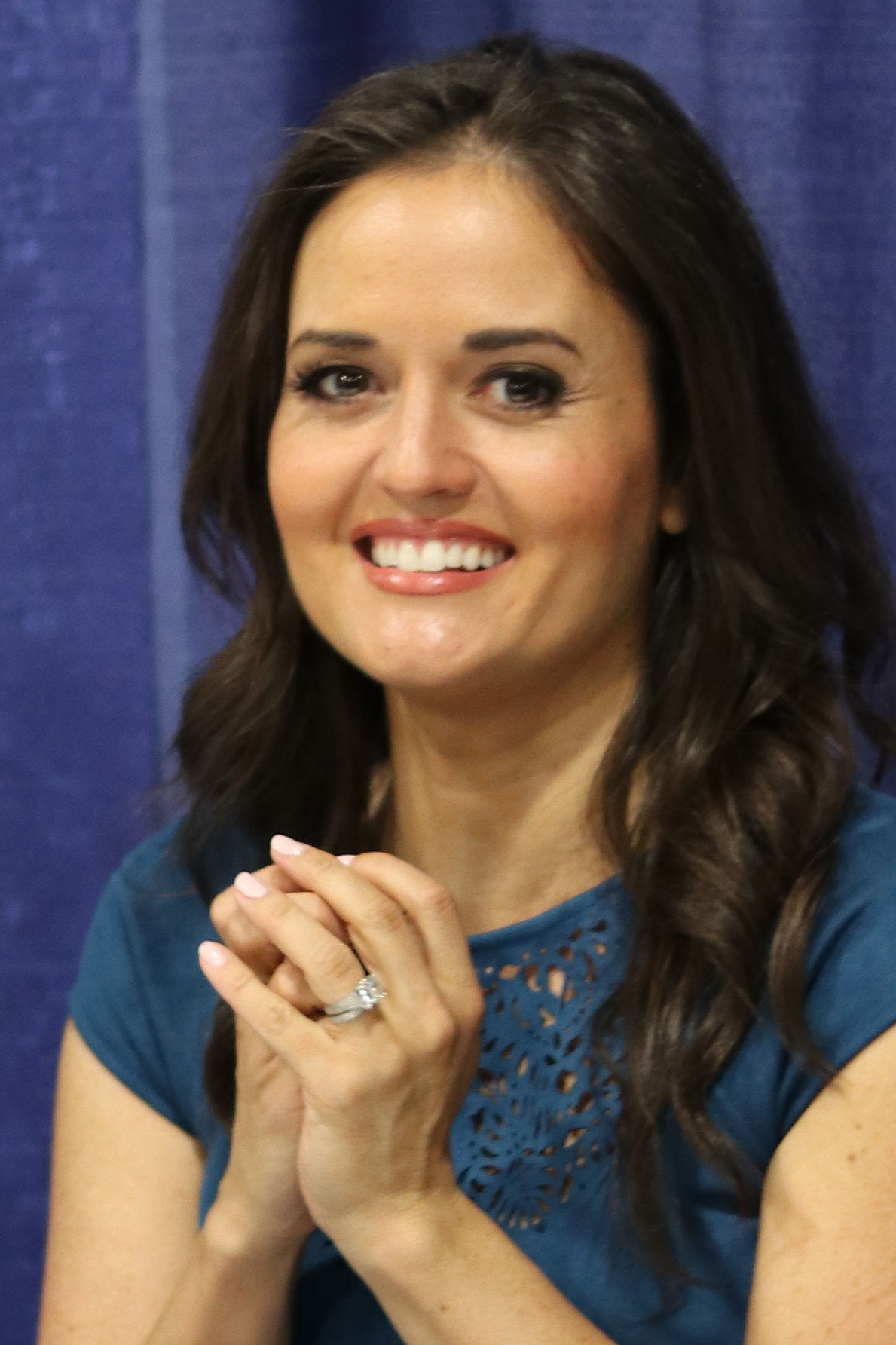
Danica McKellar

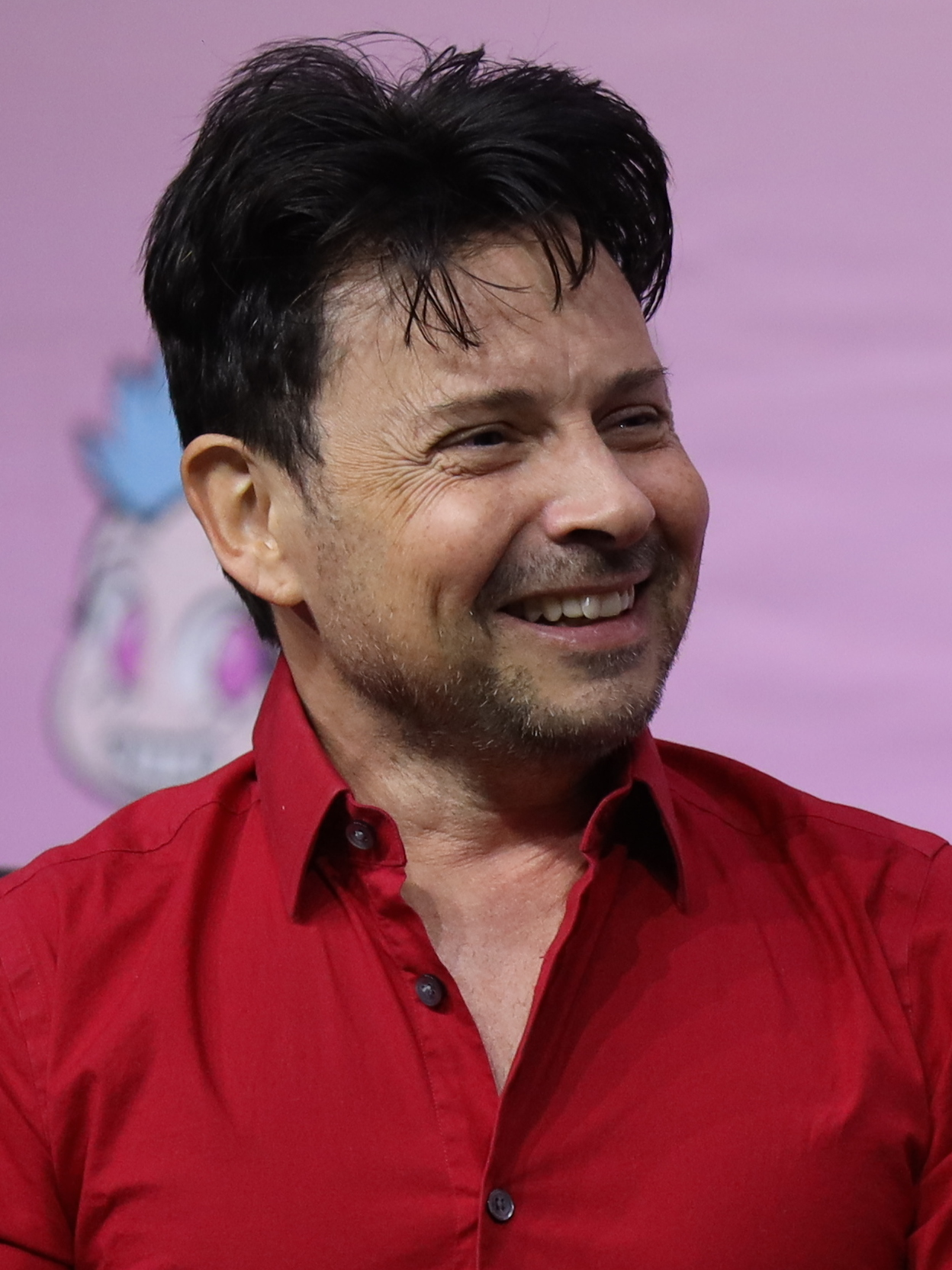
Jason Marsden

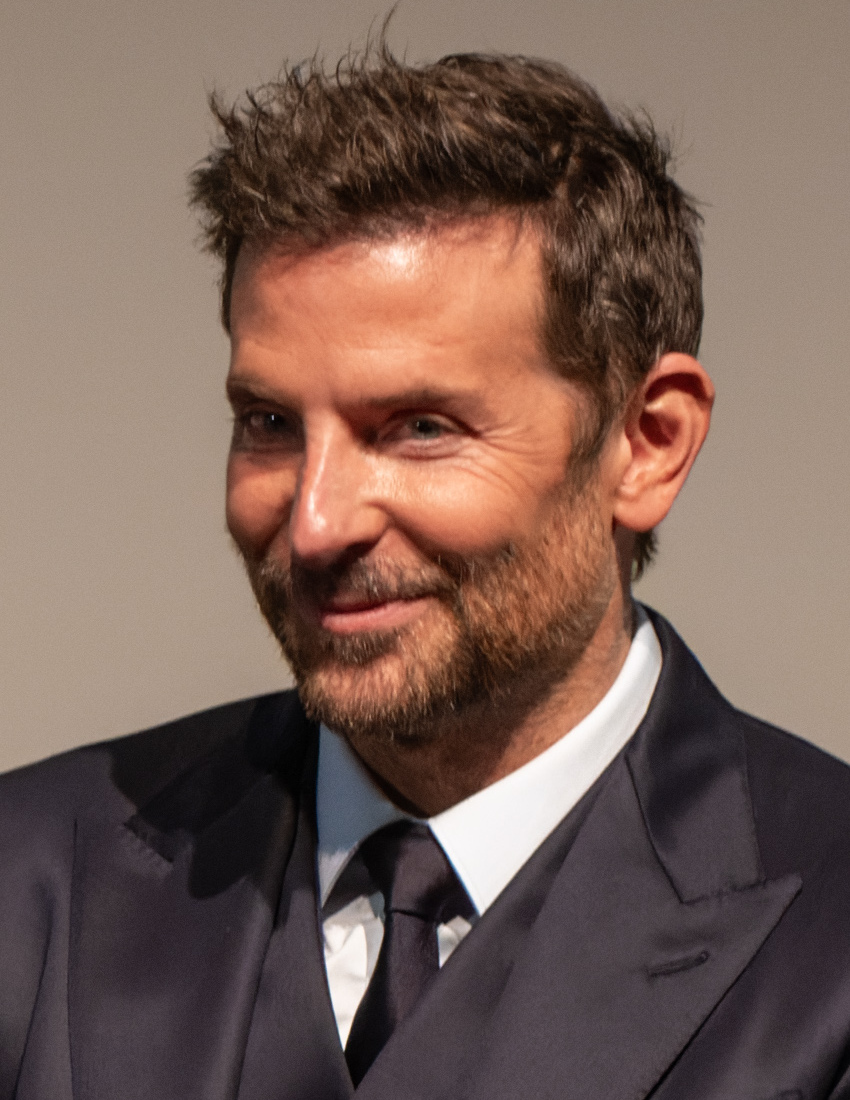
Bradley Cooper

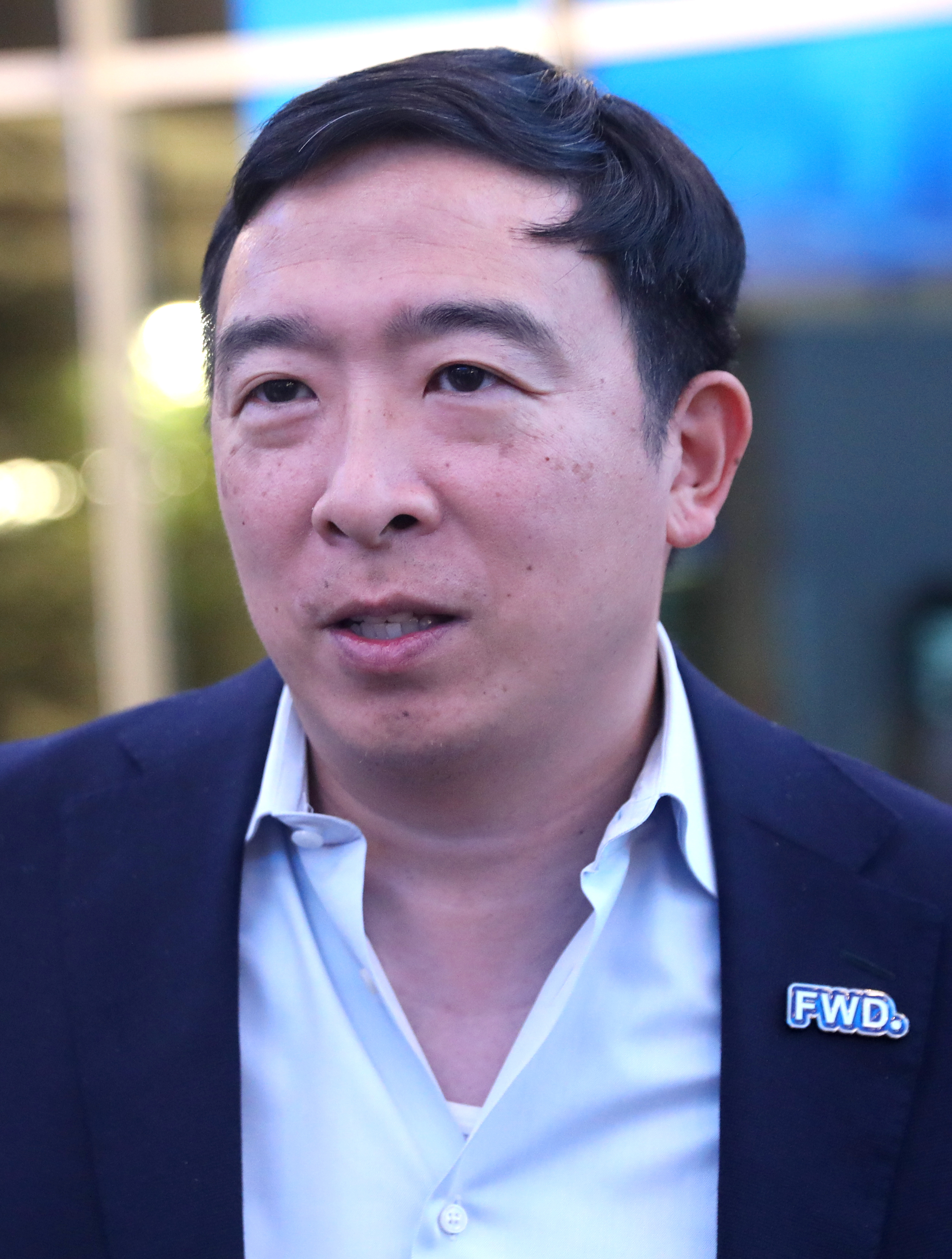
Andrew Yang

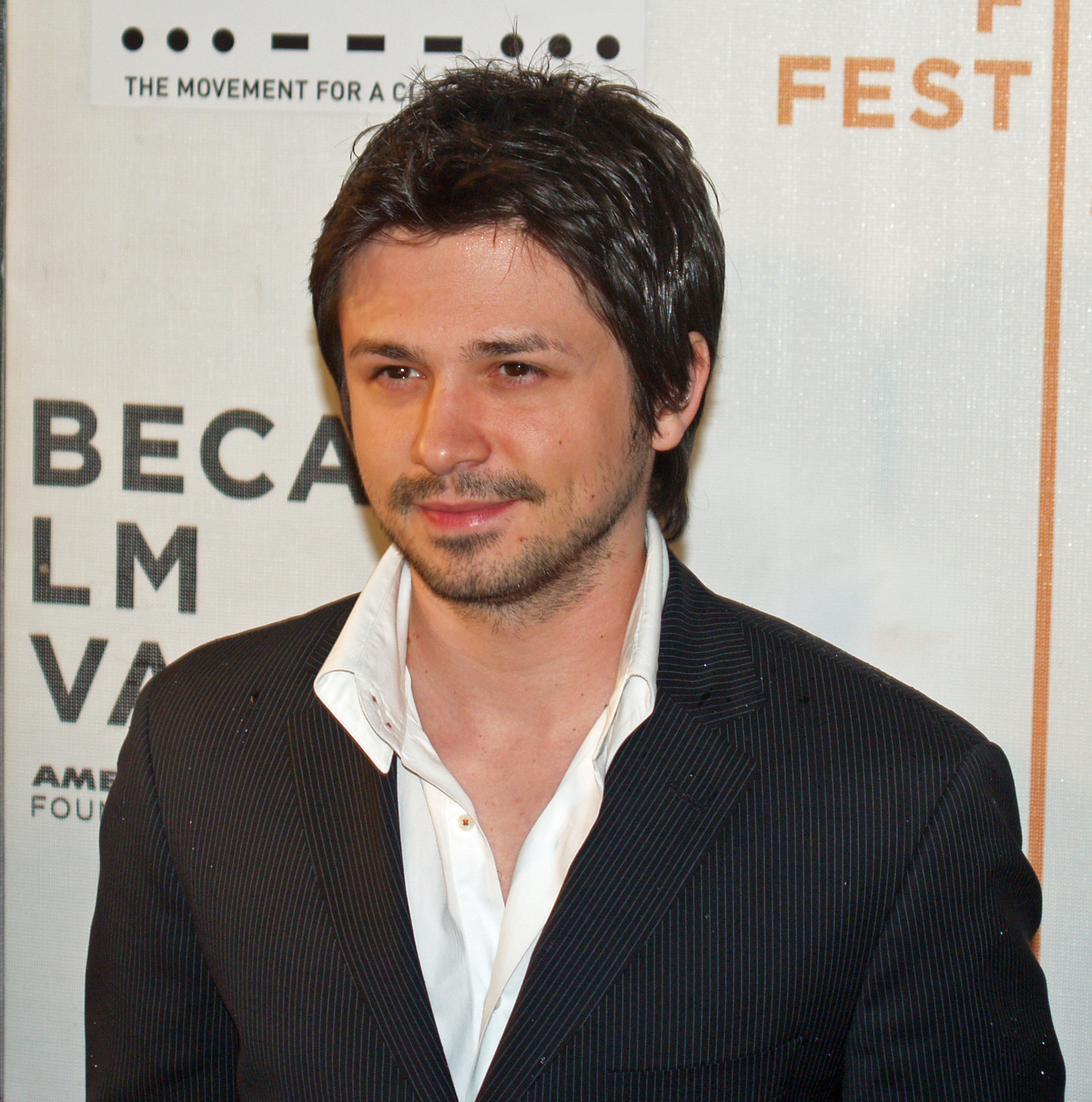
Freddy Rodriguez

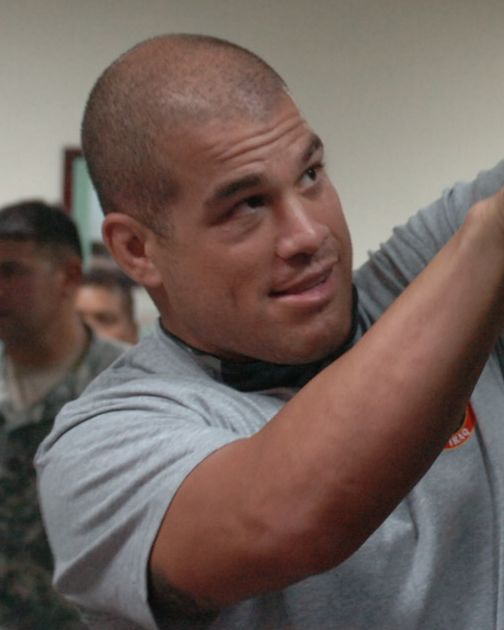
Tito Ortiz

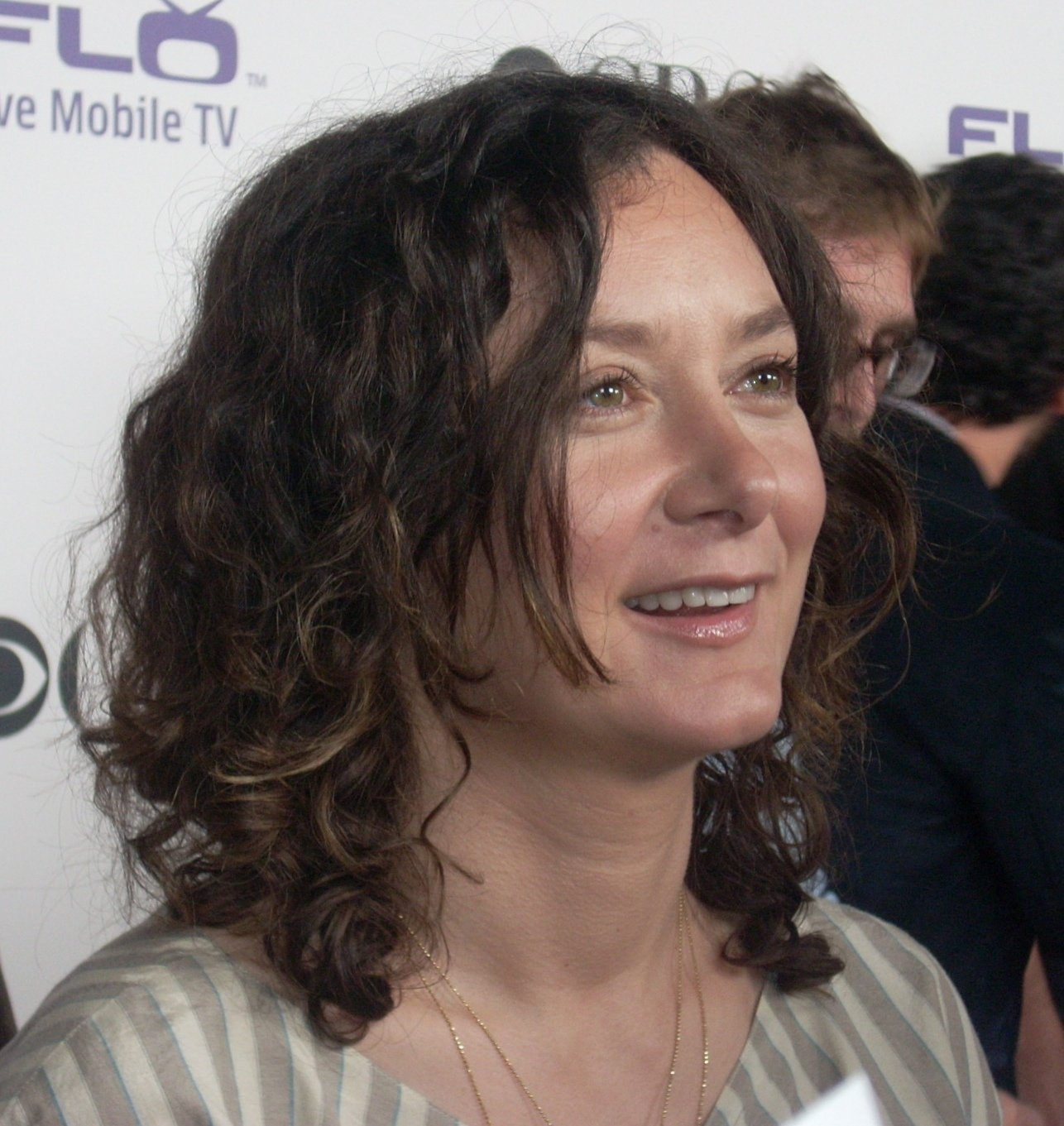
Sara Gilbert

- January 2
  - Emanuel Augustus, boxer
  - Corey Brewer, basketball player
  - Ryan Brown, actor
  - Dax Shepard, actor
  - Jeff Suppan, baseball player
- January 3
  - Danica McKellar, actress and education advocate
  - Jason Marsden, actor
- January 4
  - Dan Beery, Olympic rower
  - Shane Carwin, mixed martial artist and wrestler
- January 5
  - Riley Breckenridge, drummer for Thrice
  - Bradley Cooper, actor and filmmaker
  - Mike Grier, ice hockey player
- January 6
  - Laura Berg, softball player
  - Big Fase 100, rapper
  - Nicole DeHuff, actress (d. 2005)
  - James Farrior, football player
- January 7
  - Steve Bell, soccer player
  - Stephanie Birkitt, attorney
- January 8 – Justin Alfond, politician and real estate developer
- January 9 – Vince Amey, football player and coach
- January 10 – Jake Delhomme, football player
- January 11
  - Kabir Akhtar, director and editor
  - Brad Badger, football player
  - Chris Burrous, journalist (d. 2018)
  - Rory Fitzpatrick, ice hockey player
- January 13 – Andrew Yang, entrepreneur, political commentator, founder of Venture for America, and 2020 Democratic presidential candidate
- January 14
  - Shawn Barber, football player
  - Ricardo López, Uruguayan-born pest control worker who tried to murder Björk (d. 1996)
- January 16
  - Steve Adams, bassist for Animal Liberation Orchestra
  - Kevin Boles, baseball coach
  - Brian C. Buescher, judge
  - Julie Ann Emery, actress
- January 17
  - Brian Brushwood, magician, podcaster, author, lecturer, YouTuber, and comedian
  - Coco Lee, Hong Kong-born singer/songwriter, record producer, dancer, and actress (d. 2023)
  - Freddy Rodriguez, actor
- January 18 – Marcus Brandon, politician
- January 19
  - Maurice Anderson, football player
  - Steve Balderson, director
  - Noah Georgeson, singer/songwriter, guitarist and producer
- January 20
  - David Eckstein, baseball player
  - Eric Healey, ice hockey player
  - Rake Yohn, television personality and stunt performer
- January 21
  - Saqib Ali, politician
  - Zach Helm, writer, director, and producer
- January 22
  - Calvin Brock, boxer
  - Balthazar Getty, actor
  - Rick Mora, actor and model
- January 23
  - Kevin Alexander, football player
  - B.G. Knocc Out, rapper and songwriter
  - Brian Balmages, composer, conductor, and educator
  - Phil Dawson, football player
  - Tito Ortiz, mixed martial artist, referee, and actor
  - Fred Coleman, football player and coach
- January 24 – Matt B. Britton, new media entrepreneur and consumer trend expert
- January 25
  - Tim Montgomery, Olympic sprinter
  - Ricky Rodriguez, convicted murderer (d. 2005)
  - John Wade, football player
- January 27
  - Darrin Bell, cartoonist and comic writer
  - Jason Conti, baseball player (d. 2025)
  - Renee Humphrey, actress
- January 28 – Terri Conn, actress
- January 29
  - Sharif Atkins, actor
  - Tony Blevins, football player
  - Sara Gilbert, actress
  - Kelly Packard, actress
- January 31
  - Zenarae Antoine, basketball player and coach
  - Janelle Bynum, politician

=== February ===
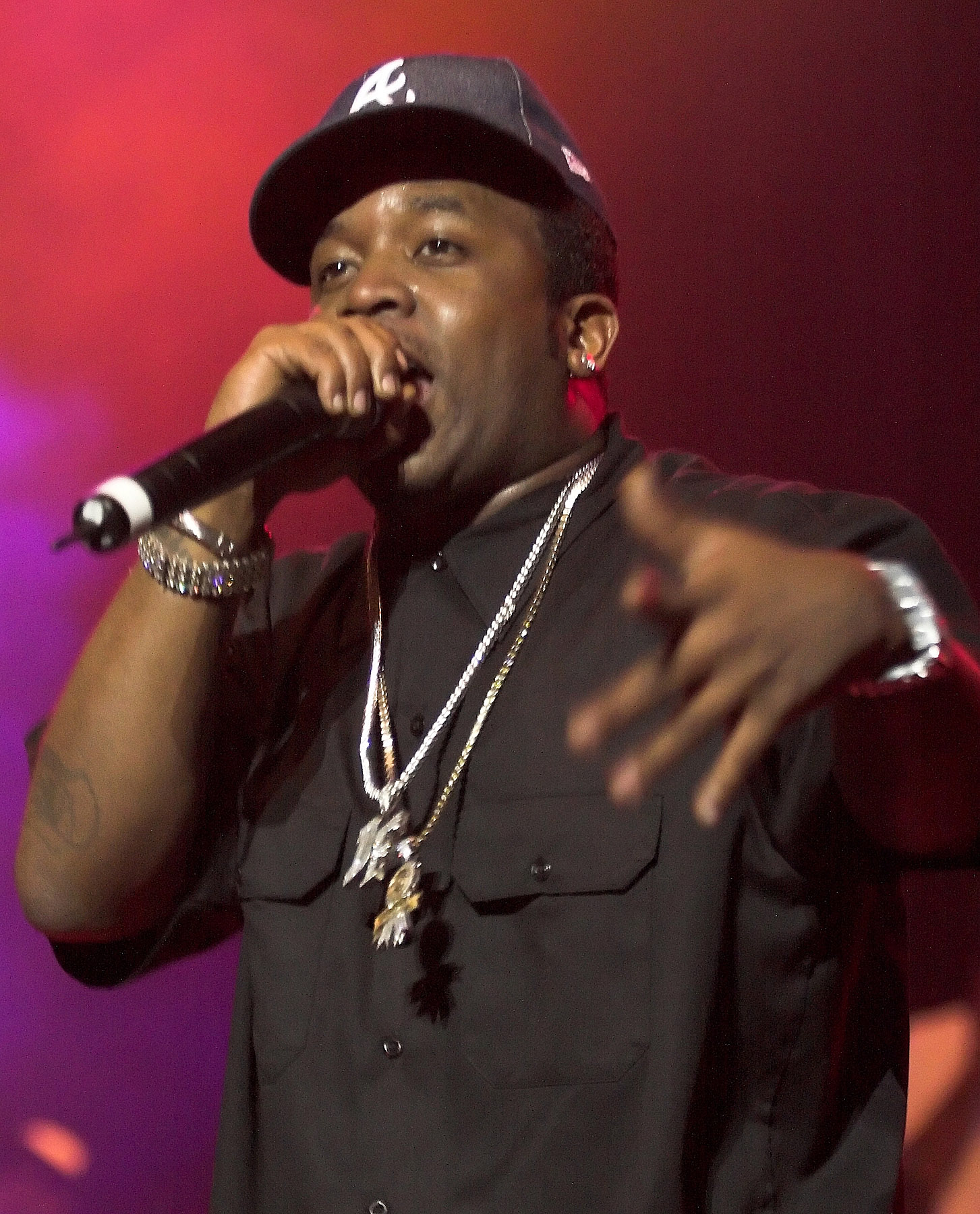
Big Boi

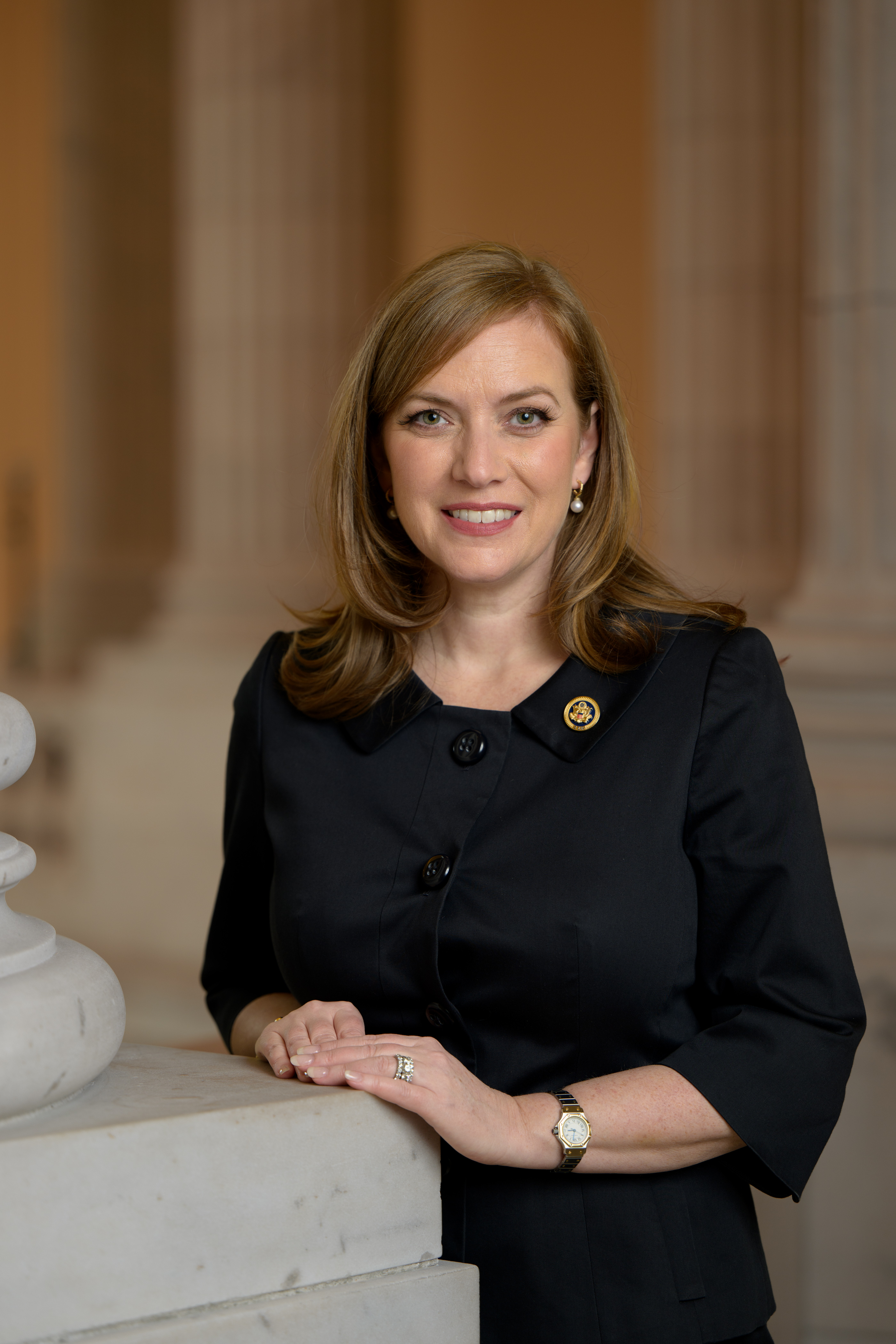
Lizzie Fletcher

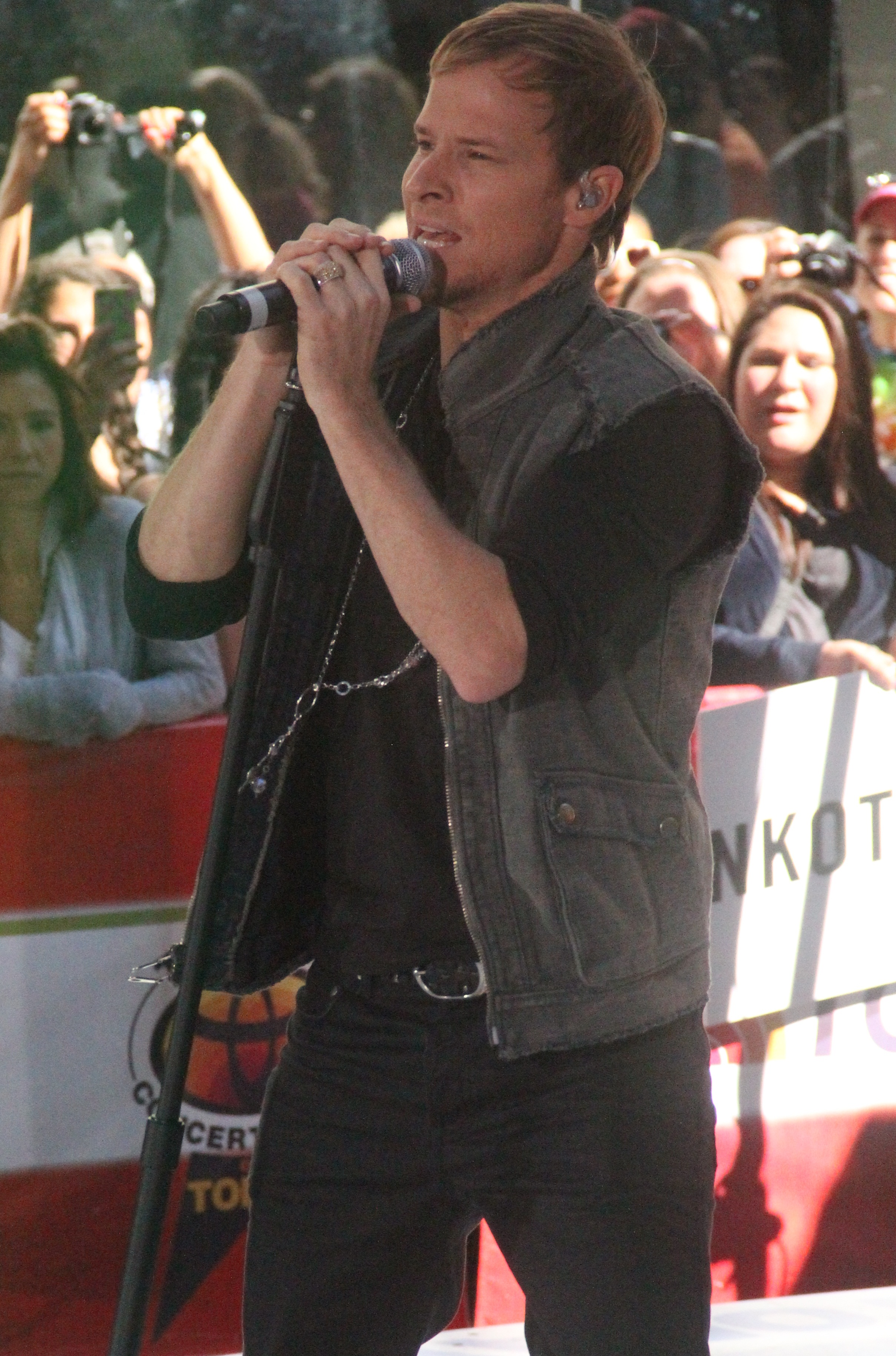
Brian Littrell

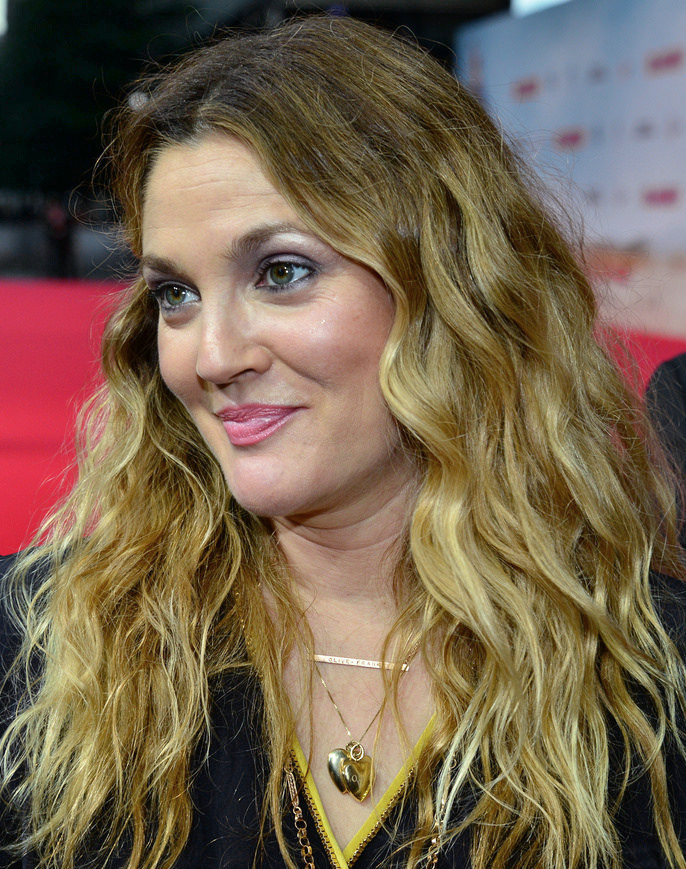
Drew Barrymore

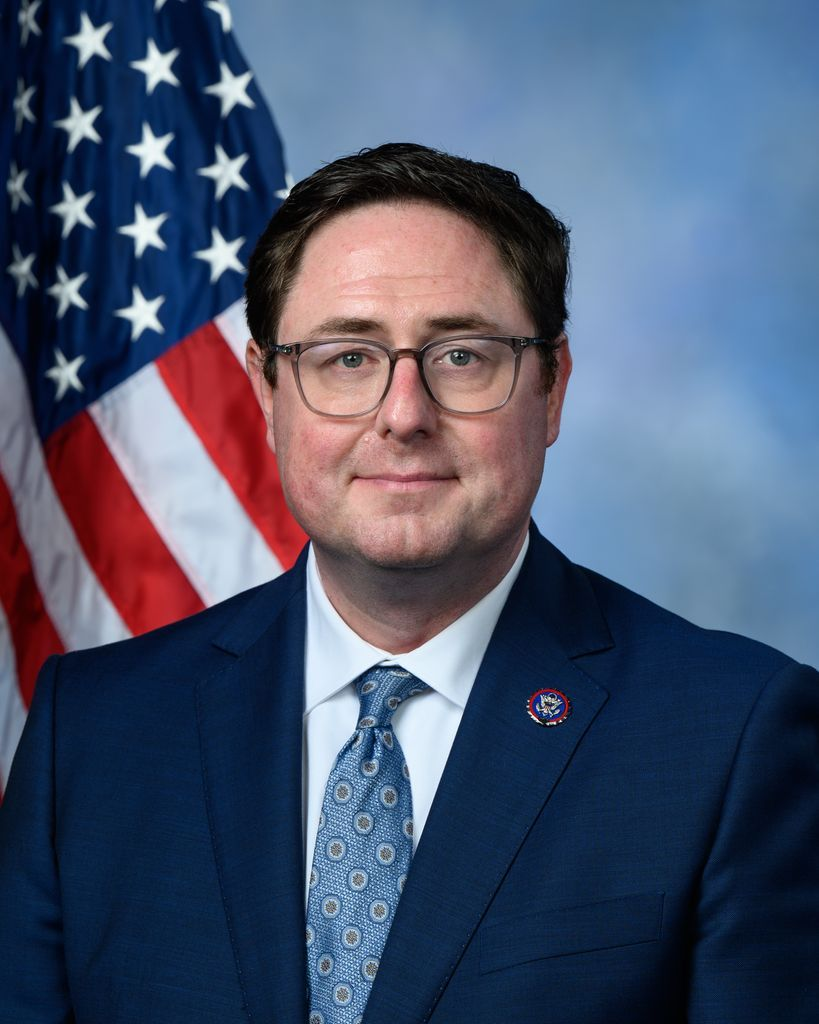
Mike Flood

- February 1 – Big Boi, rapper, actor, and member of Outkast
- February 2 – Aramis Ayala, politician
- February 3 – Nicholas Anderson, rower
- February 4 – John Michael Phillips, lawyer, consumer and civil rights advocate, and legal commentator
- February 6
  - Matt Alber, singer/songwriter, filmmaker, and youth advocate
  - Chad Allen, baseball player
  - Jason Buha, golfer
  - Naomi Grossman, actress, writer, and producer
- February 7
  - Wes Borland, guitarist for Limp Bizkit and frontman for Black Light Burns
  - Daniel Gade, Army Lieutenant colonel, disabled veteran, and political candidate
- February 8
  - Jonah Blechman, actor
  - Lil Nat, radio host
  - Shane Shamrock, wrestler (d. 1998)
- February 9
  - Terry Billups, football player
  - Dave Brainard, record producer
- February 10 – Scott Elrod, actor
- February 11
  - Lori Alhadeff, activist and founder of Make Our Schools Safe
  - Jacque Vaughn, basketball player
- February 12
  - Jen Armbruster, Paralympic goalball player
  - Bobby Billings, singer/songwriter
  - Cliff Bleszinski, video game designer
  - Michael Ray Bower, actor
- February 13 – Lizzie Fletcher, politician
- February 16
  - Eddie Benton, basketball player and coach
  - Daryl Bonilla, actor, comedian, and wrestler
- February 17 – David Goggins, marathon runner, triathlete, and Navy SEAL
- February 18
  - Ila Borders, baseball player
  - Sarah Joy Brown, actress
- February 20 – Brian Littrell, pop singer and member of the Backstreet Boys
- February 21
  - Bo Atterberry, football coach
  - Brandon Berger, baseball player
- February 22 – Drew Barrymore, actress, author, director, model, and producer
- February 23
  - Pat Barnes, football player
  - Mike Flood, politician
- February 25 – Chelsea Handler, comedian and television host
- February 26 – Tunde Adebimpe, musician, singer/songwriter, actor, director, and visual artist
- February 27 – Joel Burns, basketball player
- February 28 – Adam Banton, BMX rider

=== March ===
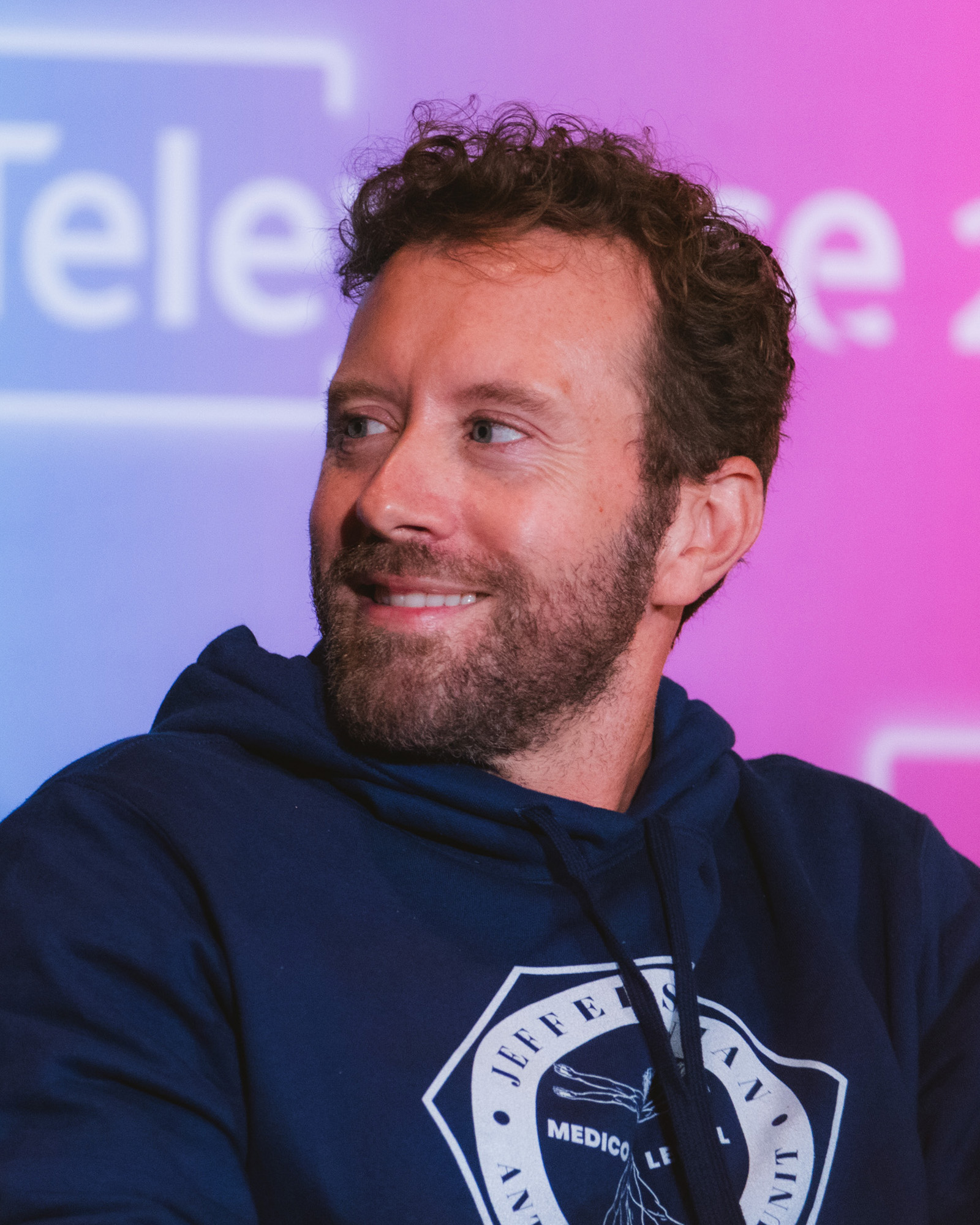
T.J. Thyne

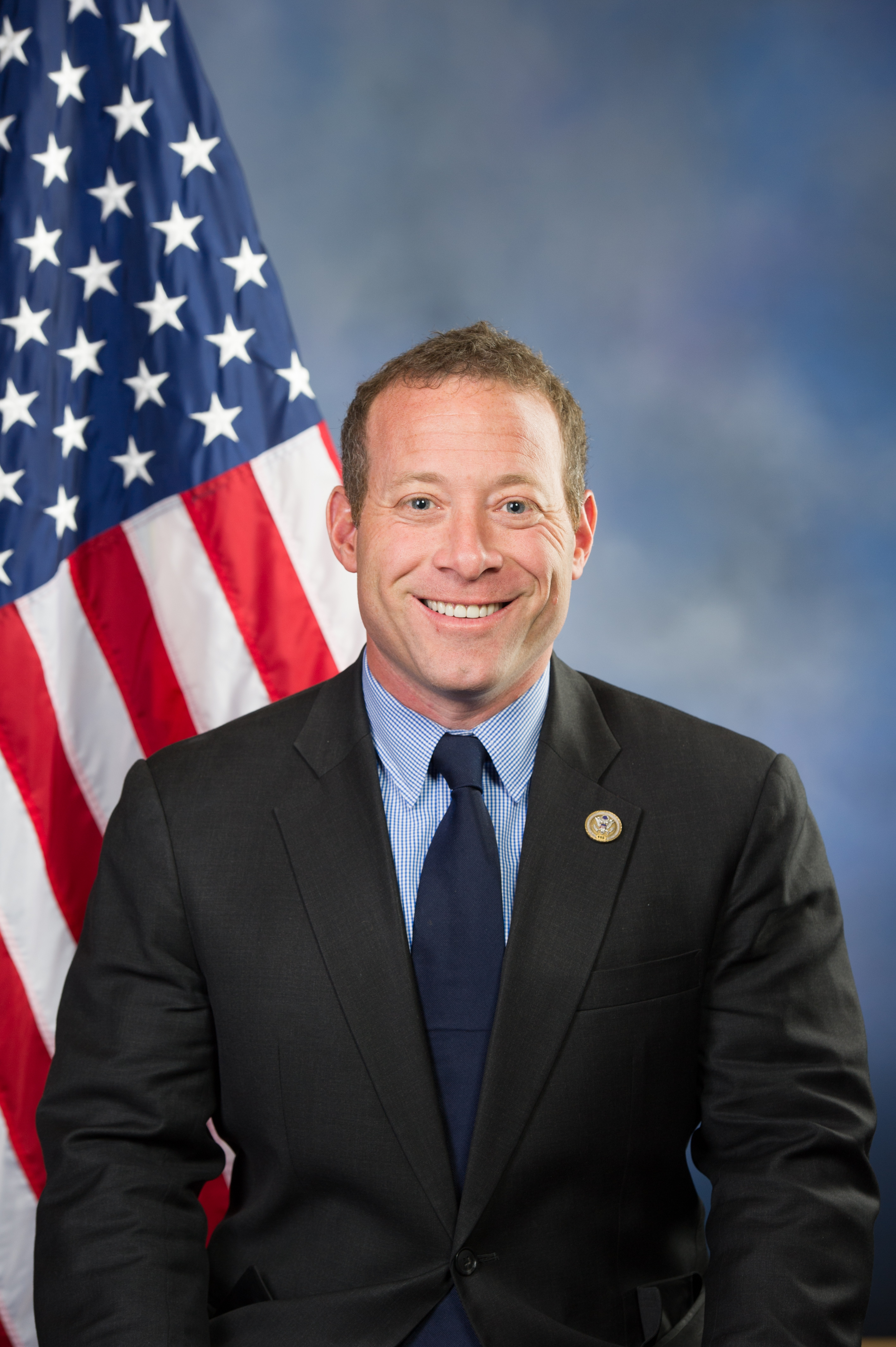
Josh Gottheimer

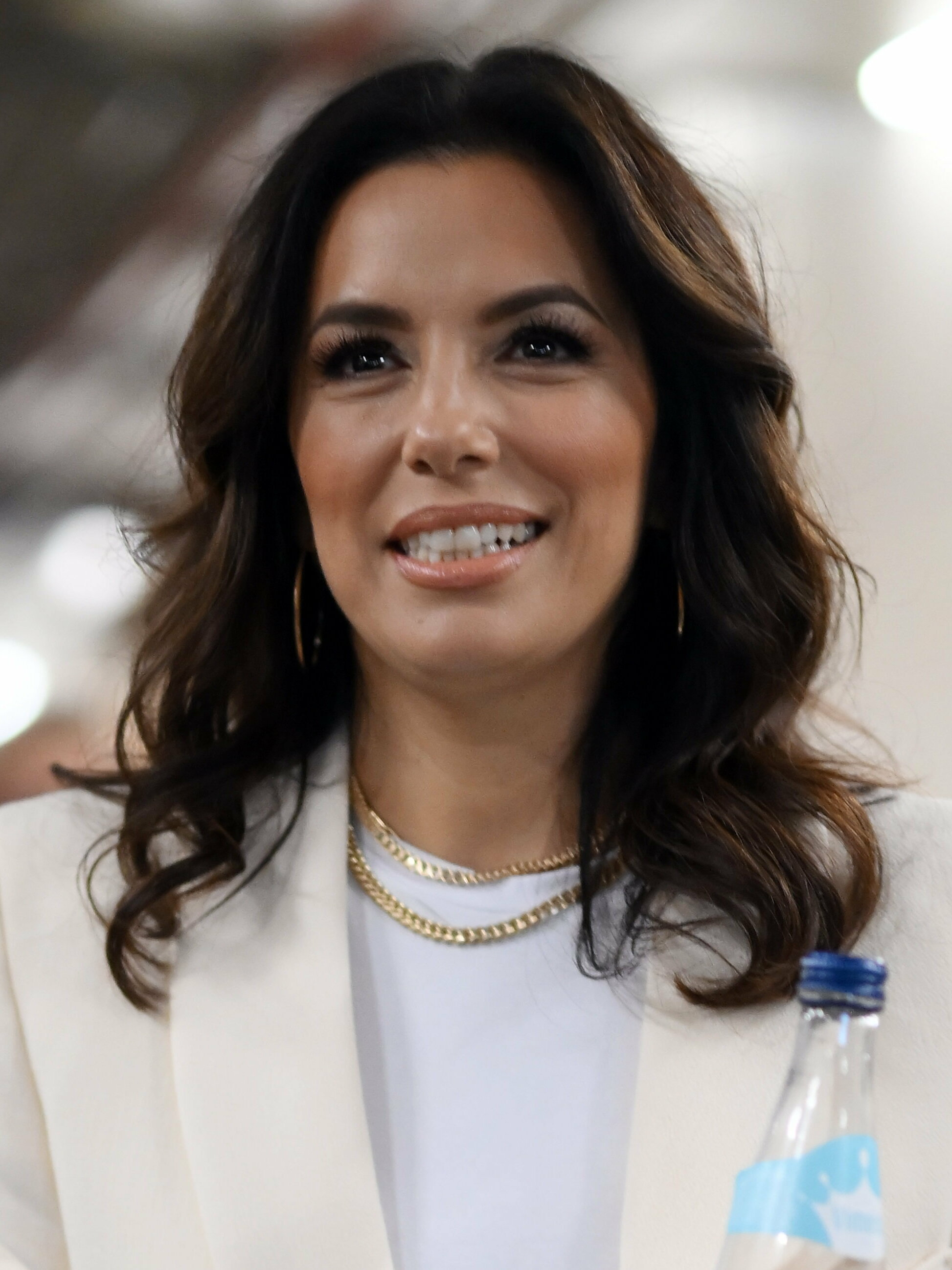
Eva Longoria

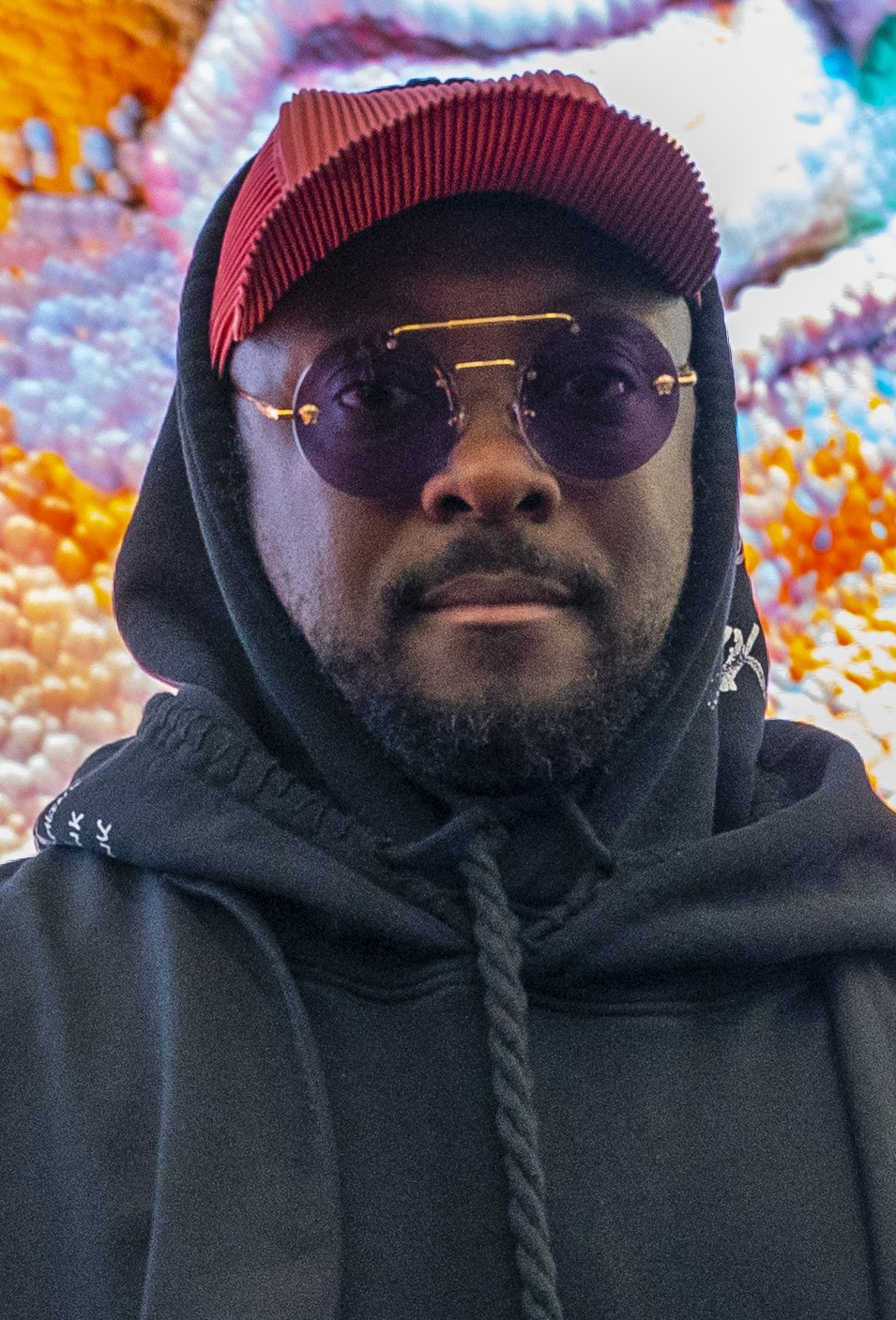
Will.i.am

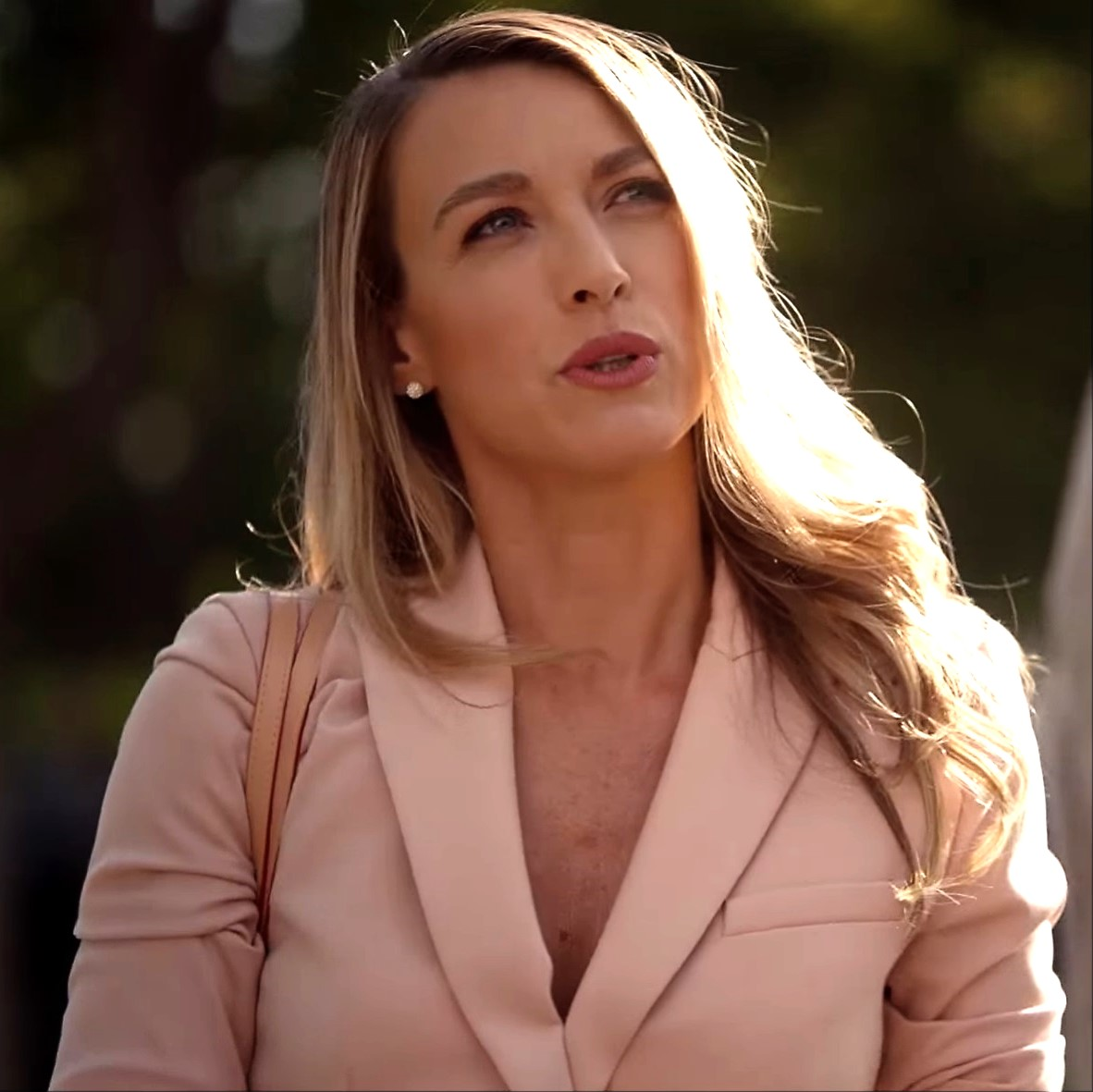
Natalie Zea

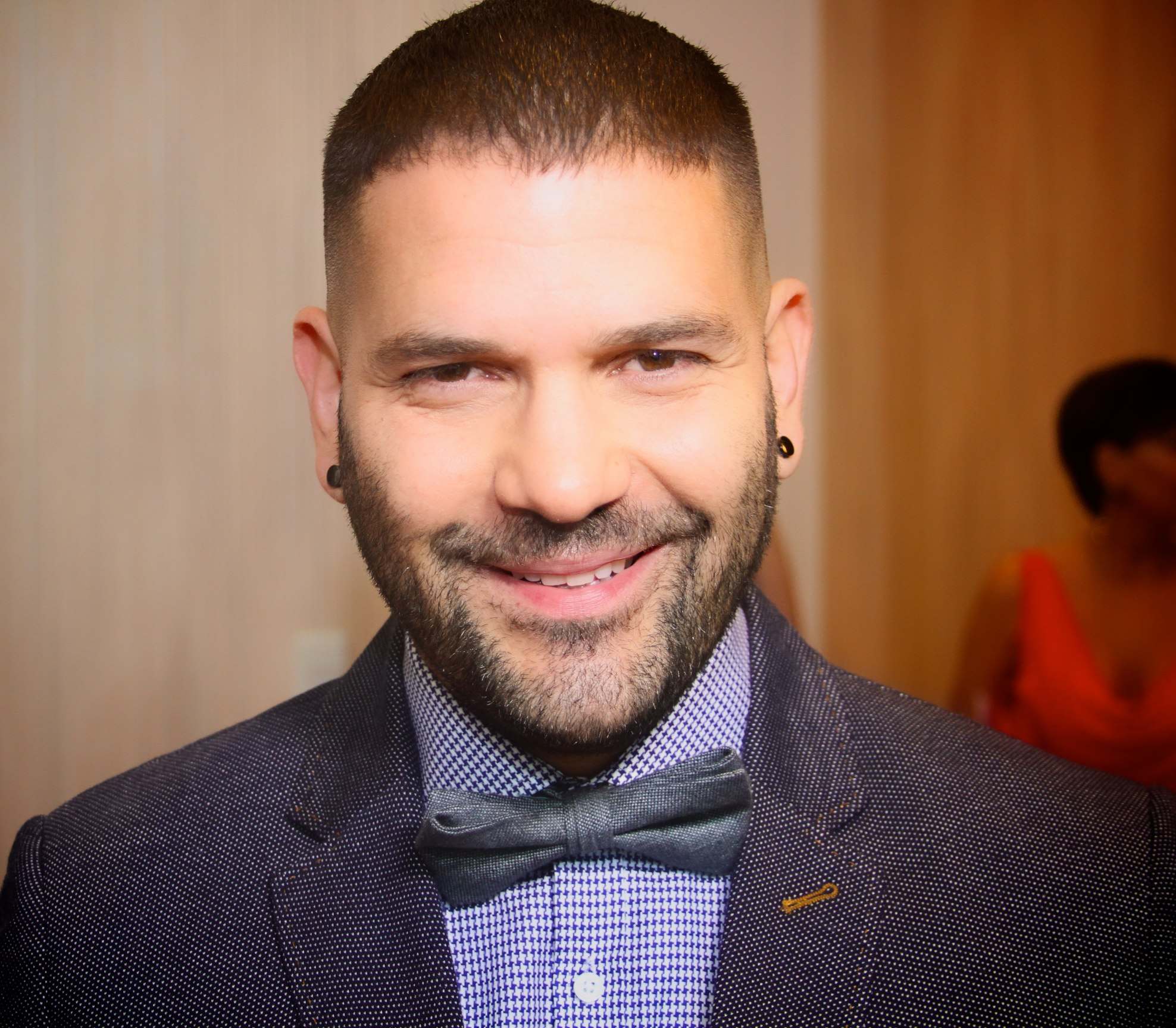
Guillermo Díaz

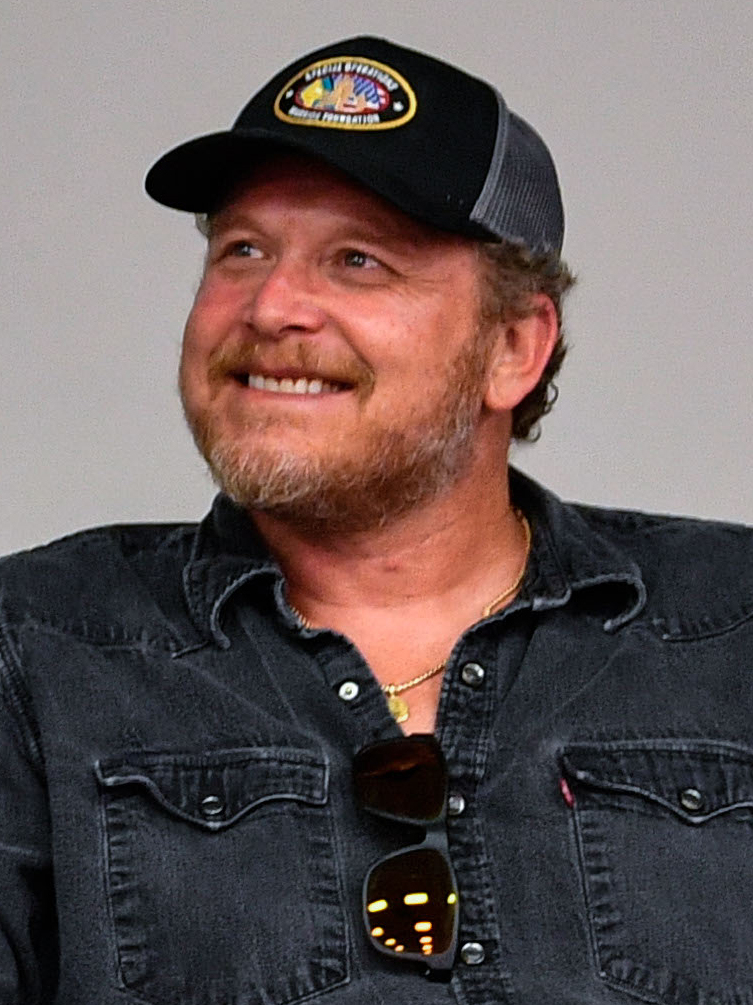
Cole Hauser

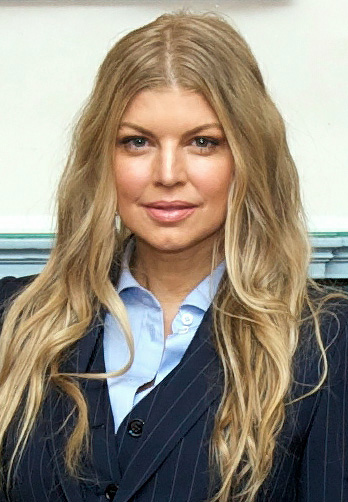
Fergie

- March 2
  - Jesse Bochco, director and producer
  - Macey Brooks, football player
- March 3
  - Tracy Anderson, entrepreneur and author
  - Wendi Michelle Scott, criminal convicted of abusing her daughter in a case of Münchausen syndrome by proxy
- March 4 – Jerod Turner, golfer
- March 5
  - Obafemi Ayanbadejo, football player
  - Jolene Blalock, actress
  - Niki Taylor, model
- March 6 – Terry Bruce, politician
- March 7
  - Audrey Marie Anderson, actress
  - T. J. Thyne, actor
- March 8
  - Billy Austin, football player
  - Josh Gottheimer, politician
- March 9
  - Matthew J. Blit, attorney
  - Oni Buchanan, poet and pianist
- March 10
  - Jamie Arnold, American-born Israeli basketball player
  - Kathy Brier, actress and singer
- March 11
  - DJ Lord, DJ and turntablist
  - Eric the Actor, TV personality (d. 2014)
- March 13 – Chris Ashworth, actor
- March 15
  - Cornell Brown, football player
  - Eva Longoria, actress
  - will.i.am, rapper and singer, member of the Black Eyed Peas
- March 16 – Tara Buck, actress
- March 17
  - Jorge Boehringer, composer
  - Leonard Byrd, sprinter
  - Ebro Darden, DJ
  - Natalie Zea, actress
  - Test, Canadian-American pro wrestler (d. 2009)
- March 18
  - Sutton Foster, actress
  - Brian Griese, football player
  - Matthew Tuerk, politician, mayor of Allentown, Pennsylvania
- March 19
  - Michael Alsbury, test pilot (d. 2014)
  - Brann Dailor, drummer for Mastodon
  - Lea Gabrielle, journalist, diplomat, naval aviator, and war correspondent
- March 20
  - Jennifer Arroyo, American-born Canadian bassist for Kittie
  - Ramin Bahrani, director and screenwriter
  - Eric Brown, football player
  - Andy Schor, politician, mayor of Lansing, Michigan
- March 21 – Justin Pierce, British-American actor/skater (d. 2000)
- March 22
  - Chris Bayne, football player
  - Jeremy Brigham, football player and coach
  - Guillermo Díaz, actor
  - Anne Dudek, actress
  - Cole Hauser, actor
- March 23
  - Shenna Bellows, politician
  - Matthew Bradford, politician
  - Heather Bowie Young, golfer
- March 25 – Damon Bruce, sports radio host
- March 26 – Juvenile, rapper
- March 27
  - Anthony Bass, football player
  - Fergie, singer and actress, member of the Black Eyed Peas (2002–2018)
- March 28
  - James Allen, football player
  - Omar Brown, football player
  - Will Cain, columnist, political analyst, and sports commentator
  - Richard Kelly, director
  - Ashley Moody, politician
- March 29 – Kusanti Abdul-Salaam, football player
- March 30
  - Ben Barnes, politician
  - Bahar Soomekh, actress

=== April ===
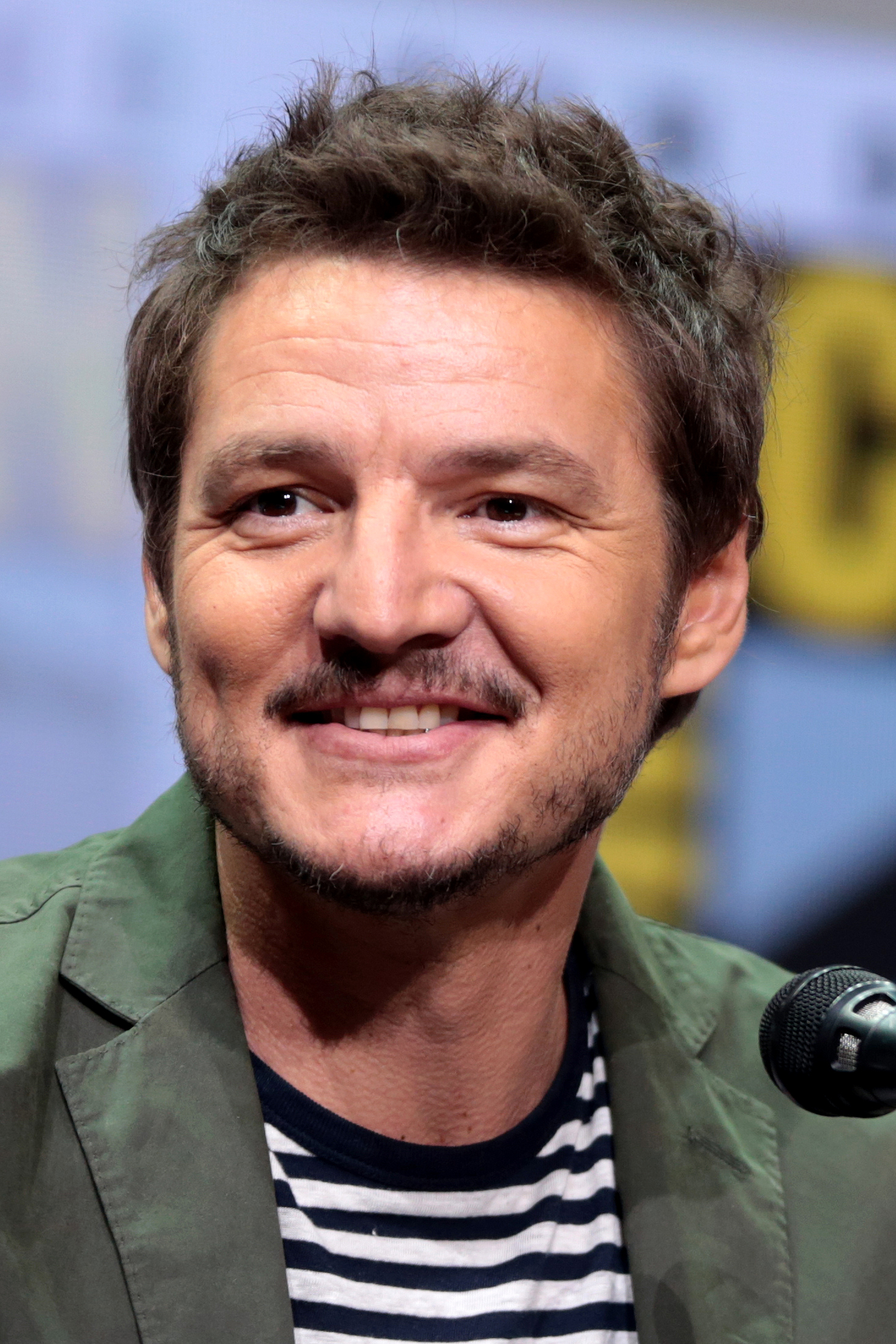
Pedro Pascal

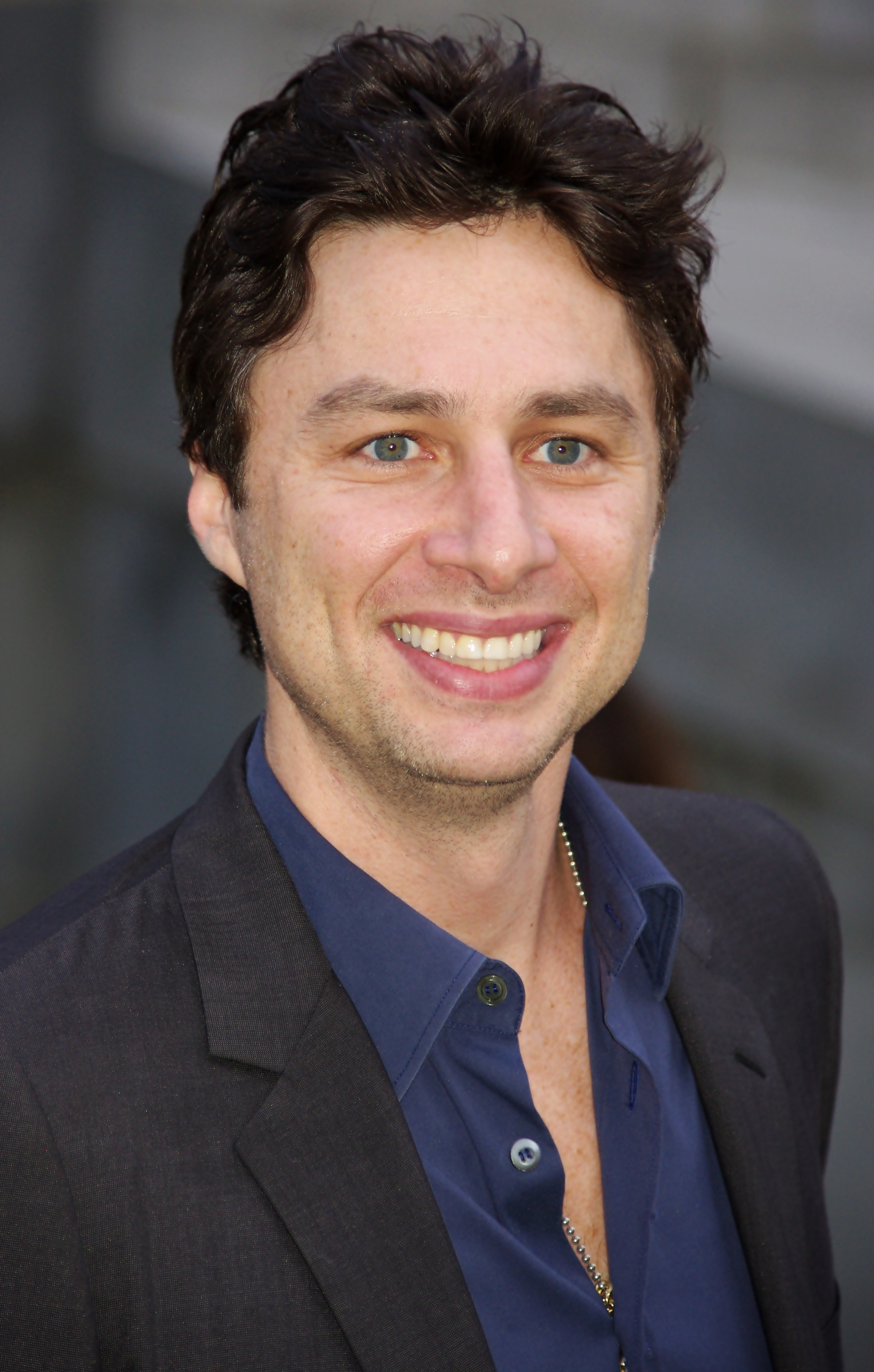
Zach Braff

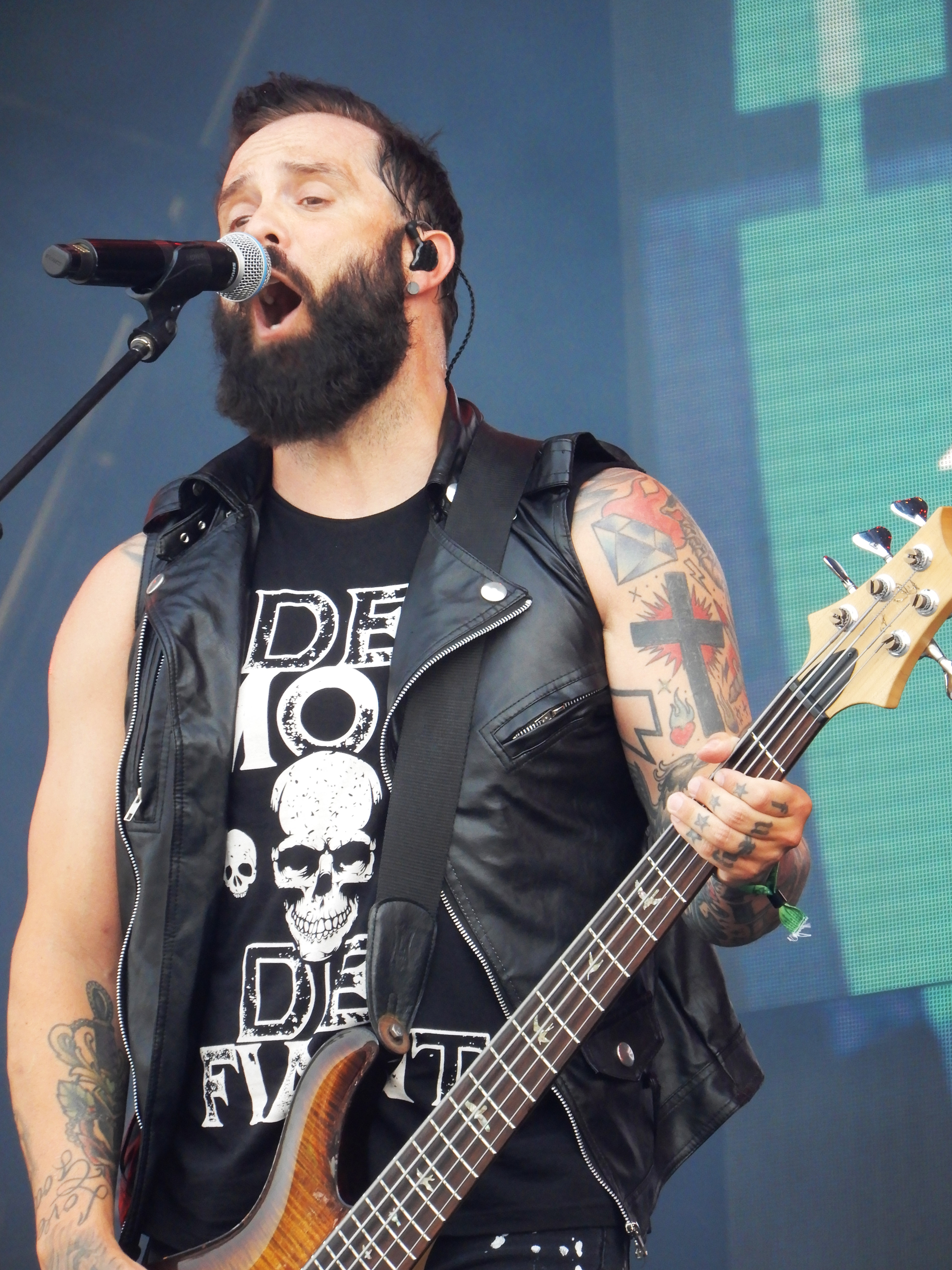
John Cooper

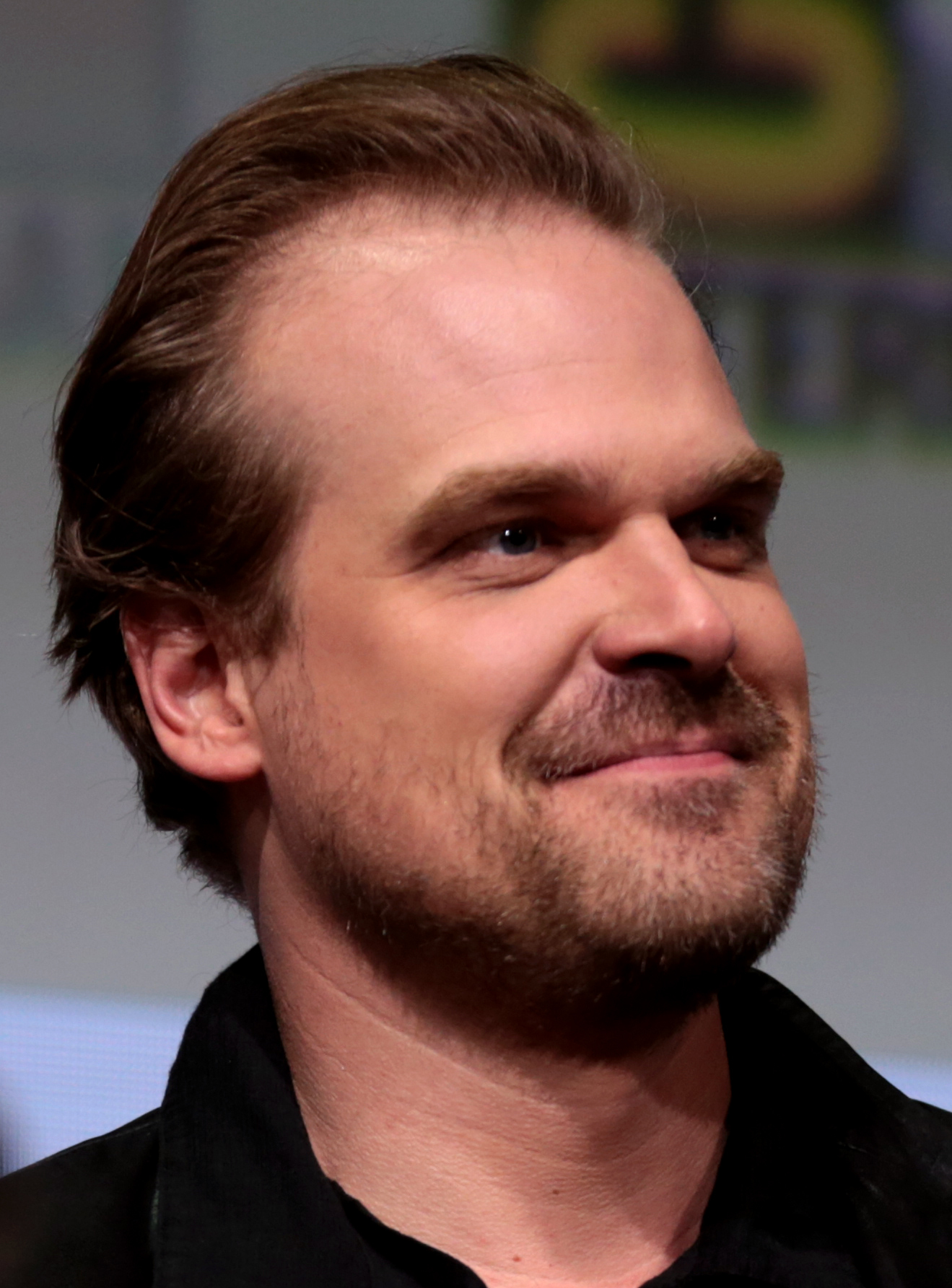
David Harbour

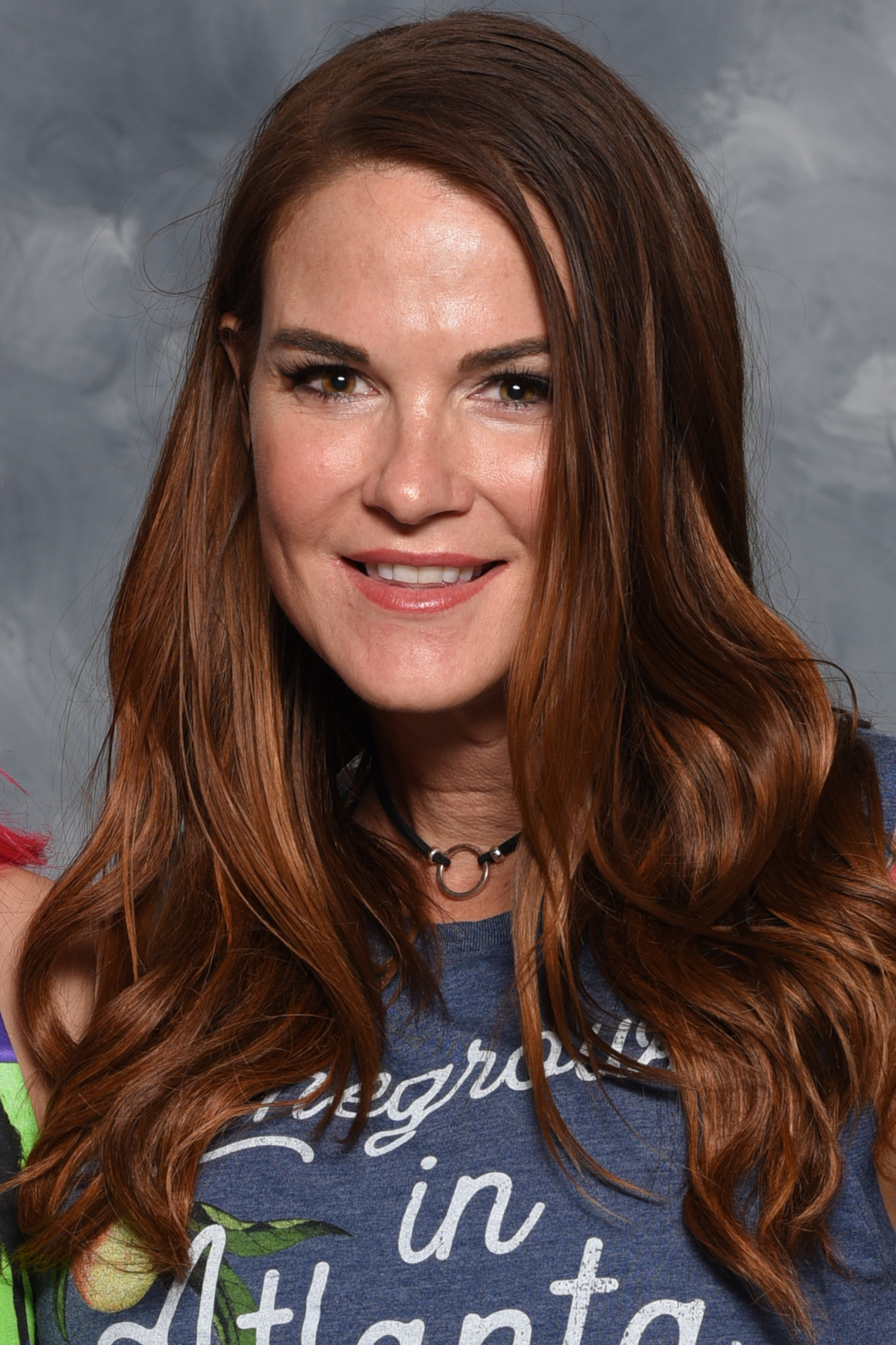
Lita

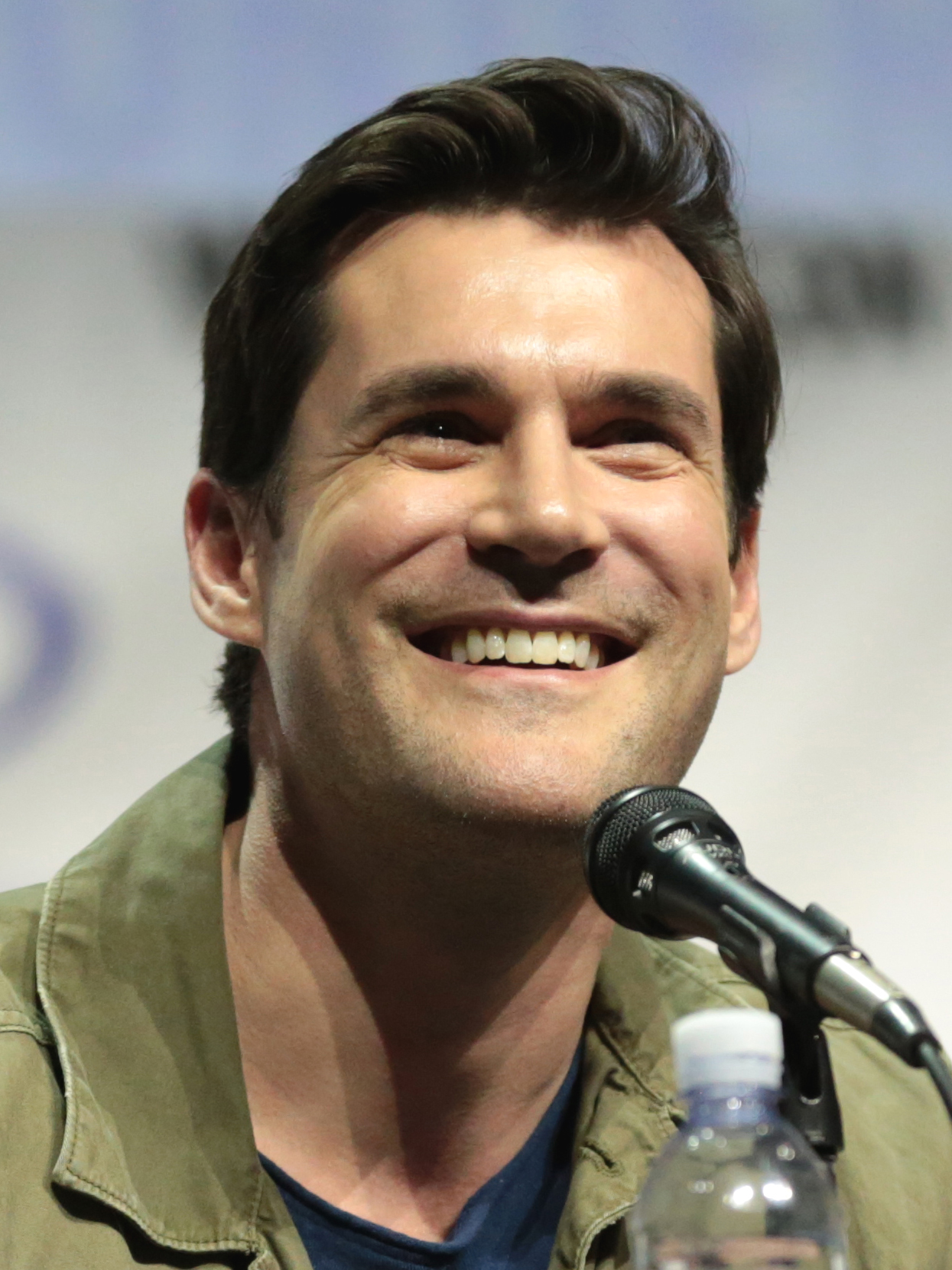
Sean Maher

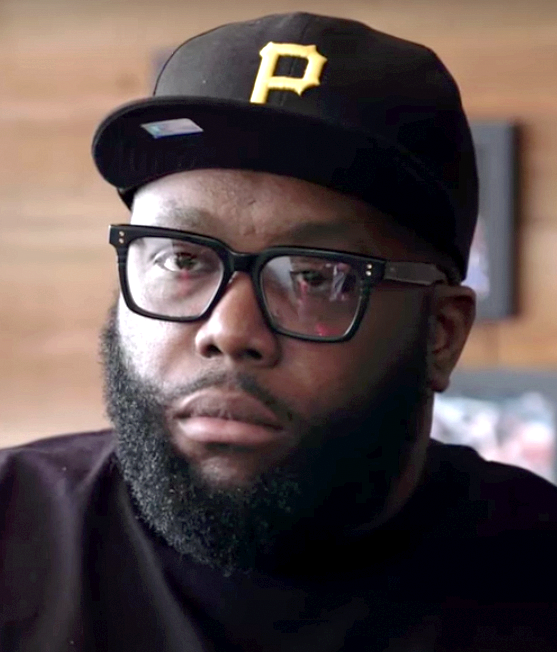
Killer Mike

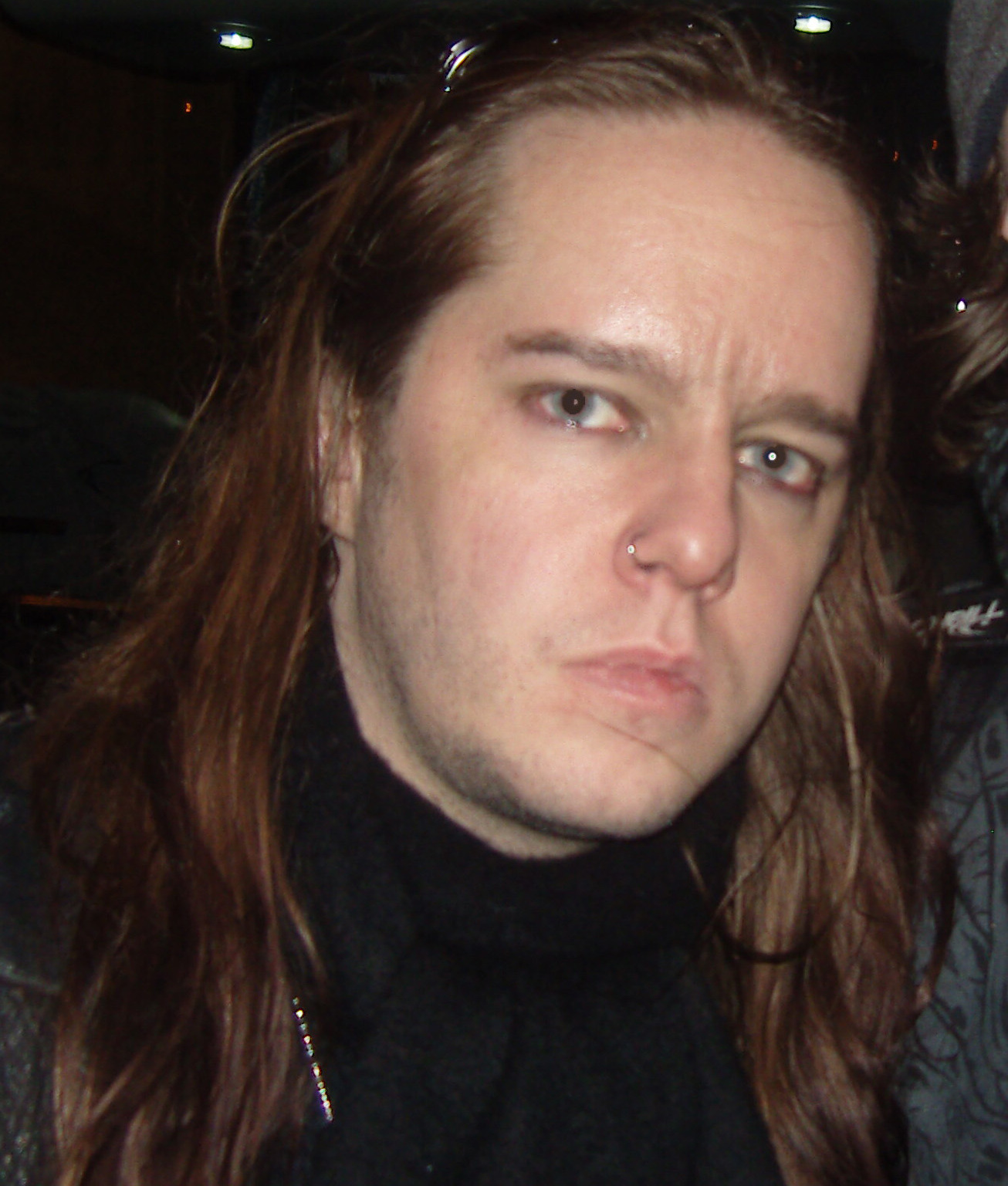
Joey Jordison

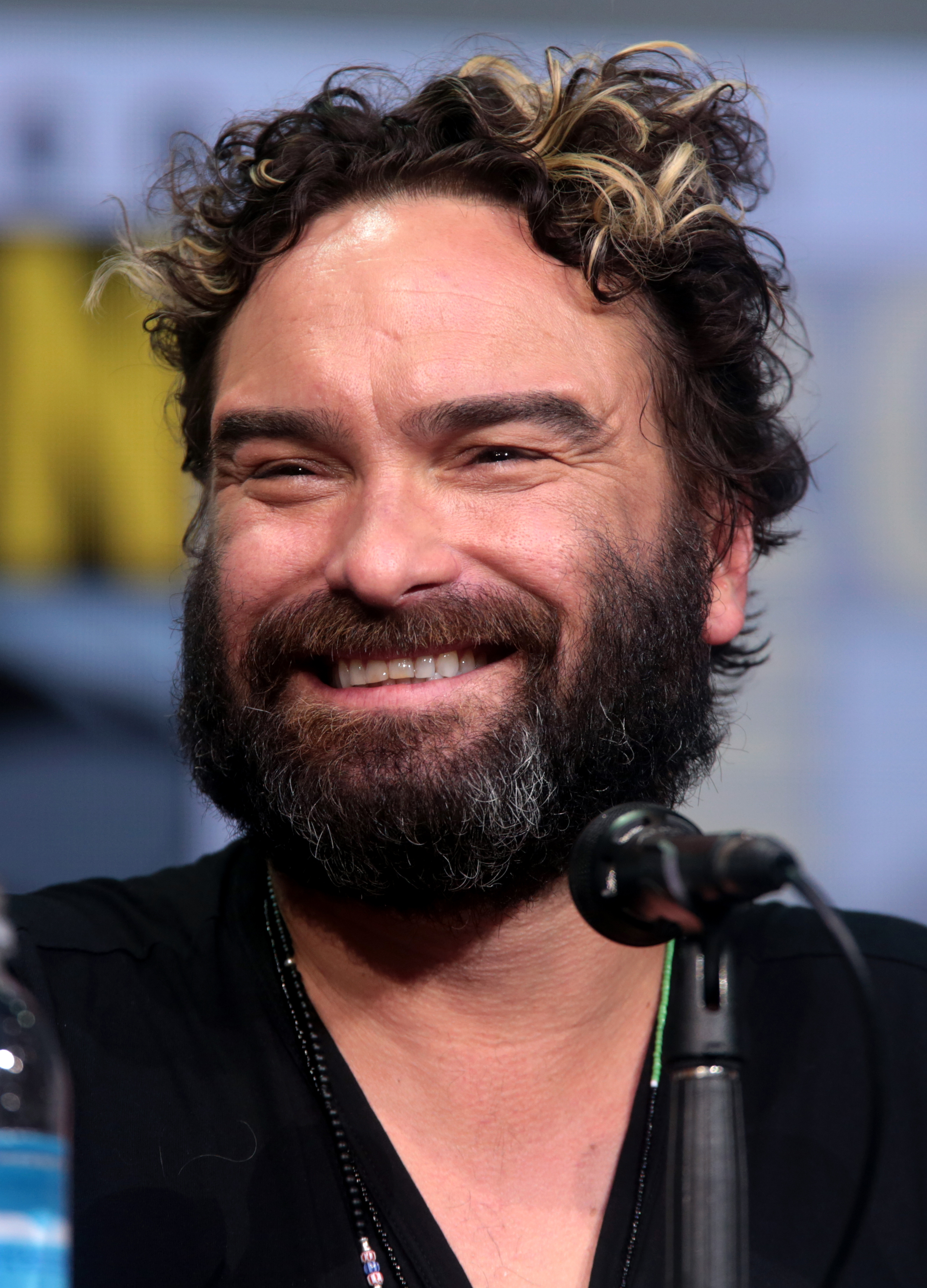
Johnny Galecki

- April 1
  - John Butler, American-born Australian singer/songwriter and music producer
  - Geoff Duncan, politician, 12th Lieutenant Governor of Georgia
- April 2
  - Nate Huffman, basketball player (d. 2015)
  - Pedro Pascal, Chilean-born actor
  - Adam Rodriguez, actor
  - Deedee Magno Hall, actress and singer
- April 3
  - Shawn Bates, ice hockey player
  - Aries Spears, stand-up comedian, actor, and writer
- April 4 – Scott Rolen, baseball player
- April 5
  - Mike Bloom, musician, singer, composer, producer, and mixer
  - Juicy J, rapper, songwriter, and record producer for Three 6 Mafia
- April 6
  - Leigh Bardugo, Israeli-born author
  - Zach Braff, actor
- April 7
  - Ronde Barber, football player
  - Tiki Barber, football player
  - Ronnie Belliard, baseball player
  - Mike Bundlie, artist, producer, entrepreneur, author, and publisher
  - Heather Burns, actress
  - John Cooper, guitarist, singer, and frontman for Skillet
- April 8
  - Jeff Banks, football player and coach
  - Carlton Bost, guitarist
  - Nick Browder, football player
- April 9
  - Sunny Anderson, television personality
  - David Gordon Green, filmmaker
- April 10
  - Marc Breuers, race car driver
  - Chris Carrabba, singer and guitarist
  - David Harbour, actor
- April 11 – Scott O. Brown, writer, letterer, publisher, editor, and production manager
- April 12
  - Marcie Alberts, basketball player and coach
  - Matt Bettencourt, golfer
- April 13 – Jeff Balis, filmmaker
- April 14
  - Mandi Ballinger, politician (d. 2025)
  - Amy Birnbaum, voice actress
  - Lita, wrestler
- April 15
  - A-Plus, rapper and producer
  - Chester Burnett, football player
  - Paul Dana, racing driver (d. 2006)
  - Philip Labonte, singer and frontman for All That Remains and Shadows Fall (1997–1999)
- April 16
  - Keon Clark, basketball player
  - Sean Maher, actor
  - Kron Moore, actress and singer
  - Karl Yune, actor
- April 18
  - JD Albert, engineer, inventor, and educator
  - Dre Allen, actor, singer/songwriter, music video director, and producer
- April 19
  - Radley Balko, journalist
  - Townsend Bell, motorcycle racer
  - Brent Billingsley, baseball player
- April 20 – Killer Mike, rapper, actor, and activist
- April 21
  - Lemon Andersen, actor and poet
  - Benjamin Butler, painter
  - Jodi Kantor, journalist
  - Killer Mike, rapper, songwriter, actor and activist
  - Brian J. White, actor
- April 22 – Ginny Owens, singer/songwriter, author, and blogger
- April 23 – Stacey Borgman, Olympic rower
- April 24 – Thad Luckinbill, actor and producer
- April 25
  - Erin Alexander, basketball player
  - Laura Bennett, Olympic triathlete
  - Emily Burt, soccer player
- April 26
  - Joey Jordison, drummer for Slipknot (d. 2021)
  - India Summer, actress
- April 27
  - Rabih Abdullah, football player
  - Michael Booker, football player
  - Andrew Ginther, politician, mayor of Columbus, Ohio (2016–present)
  - Koopsta Knicca, rapper for Three 6 Mafia (d. 2015)
- April 29
  - Josh Booty, baseball player
  - Eric Koston, Thai-born skateboarder
- April 30
  - Mike Chat, actor
  - Johnny Galecki, Belgian-born actor

=== May ===
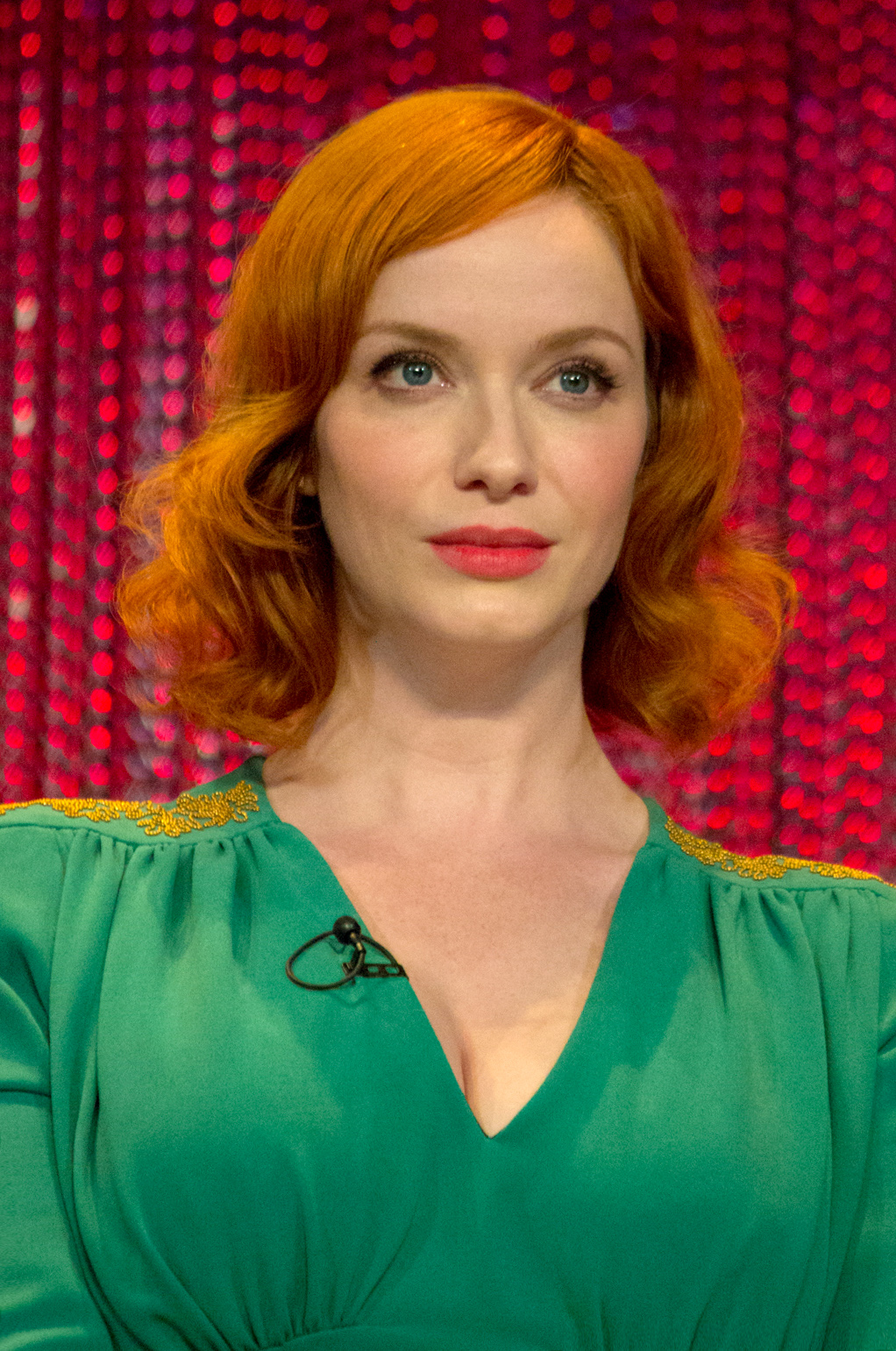
Christina Hendricks

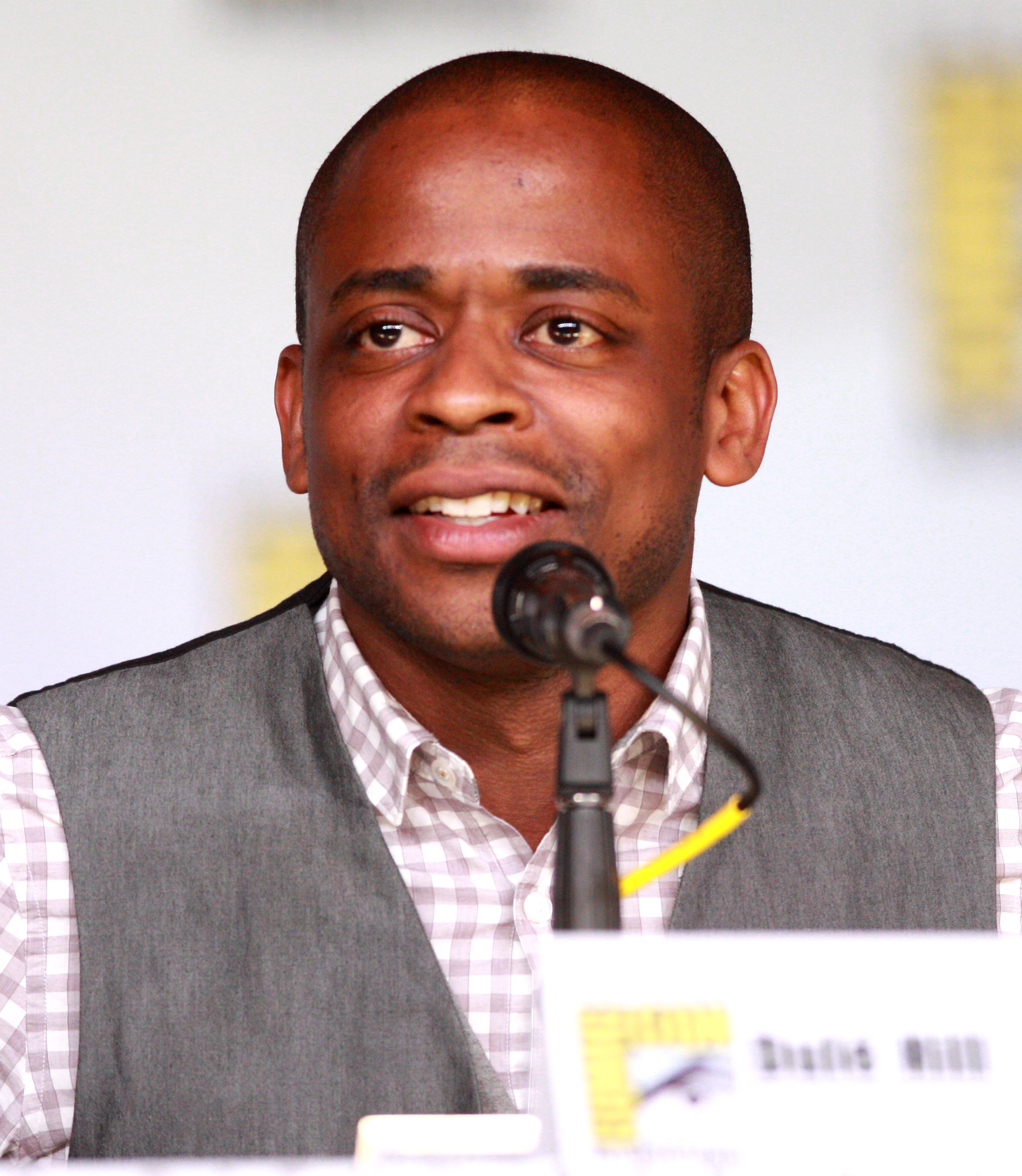
Dulé Hill

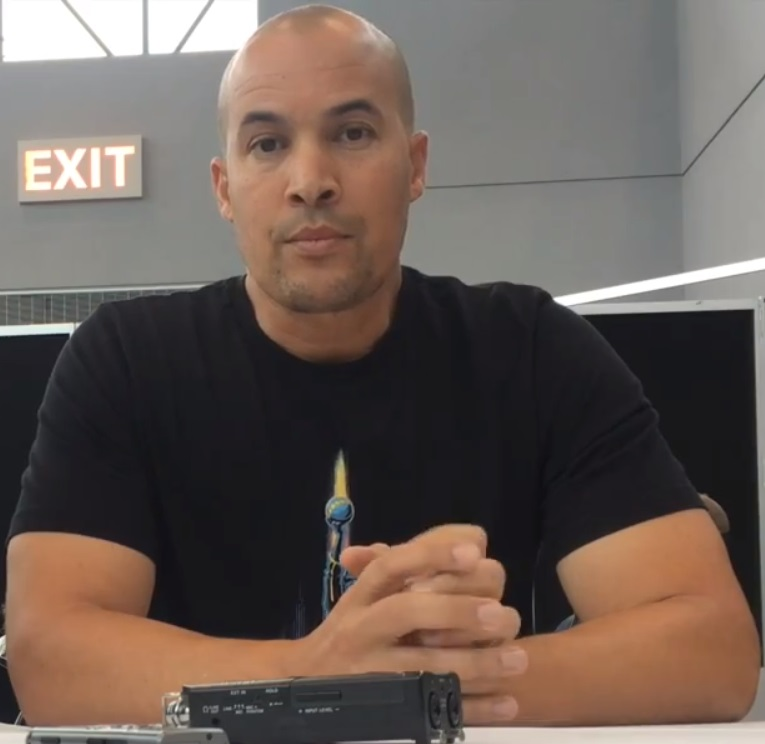
Coby Bell

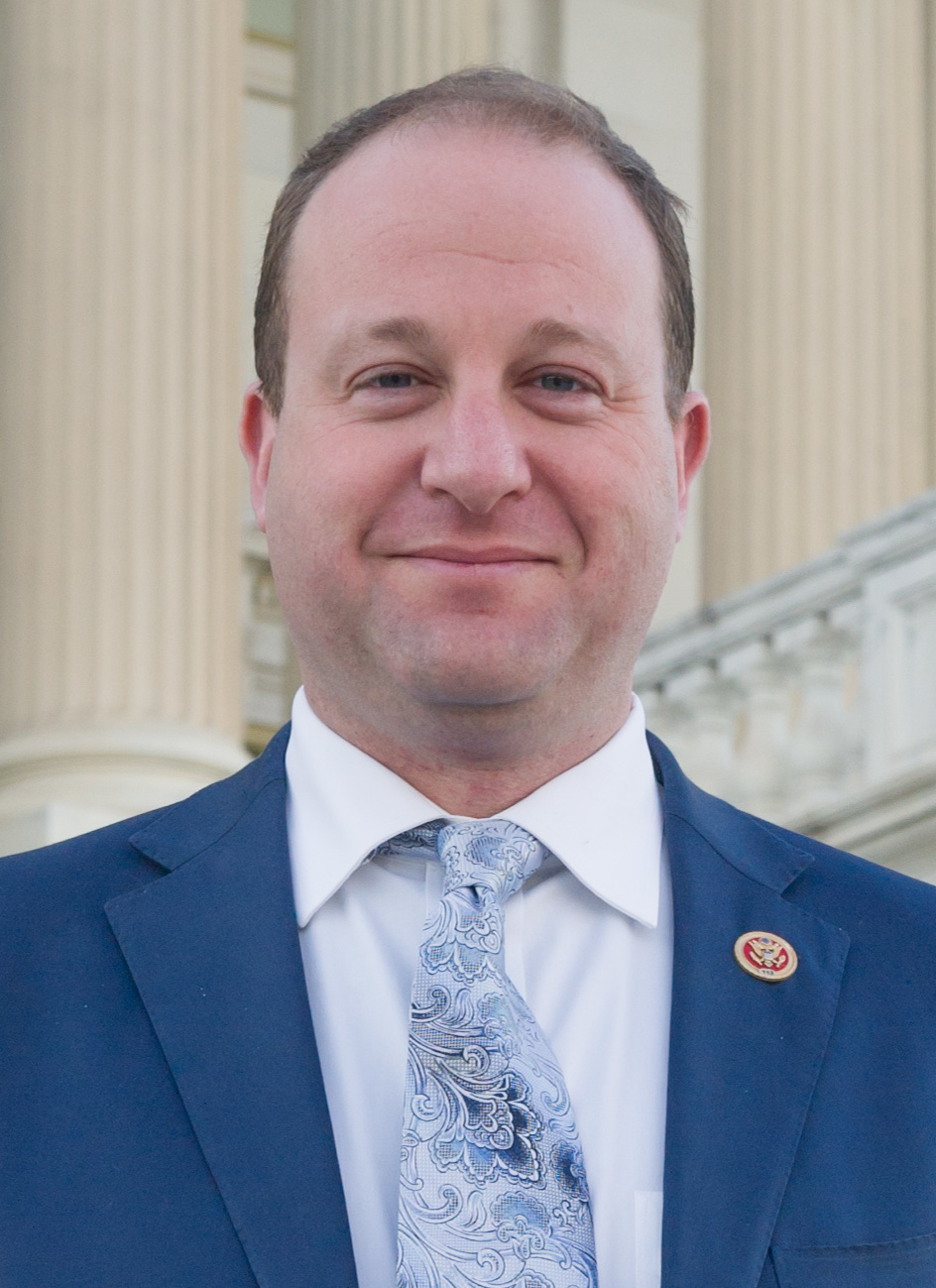
Jared Polis

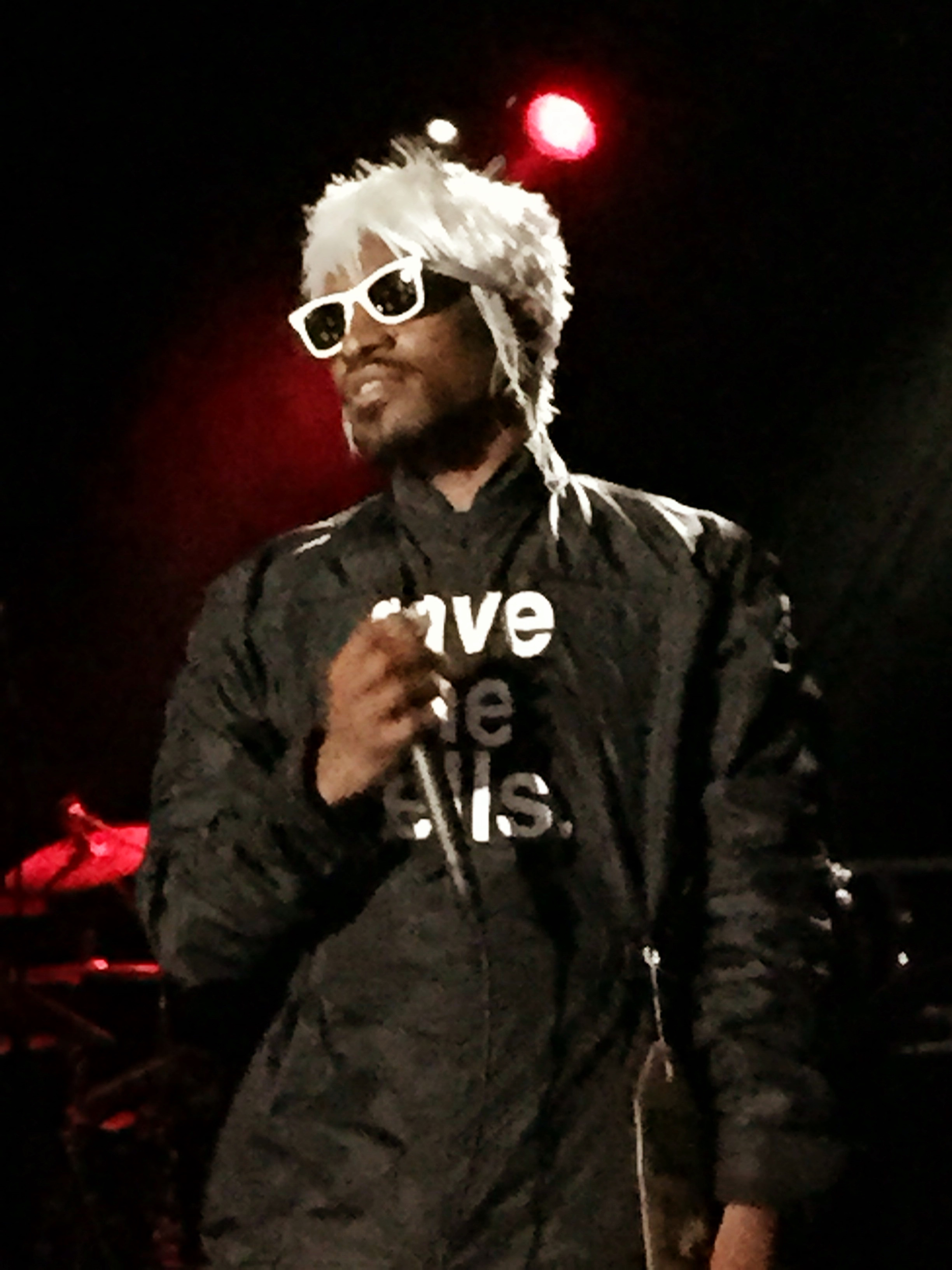
André 3000

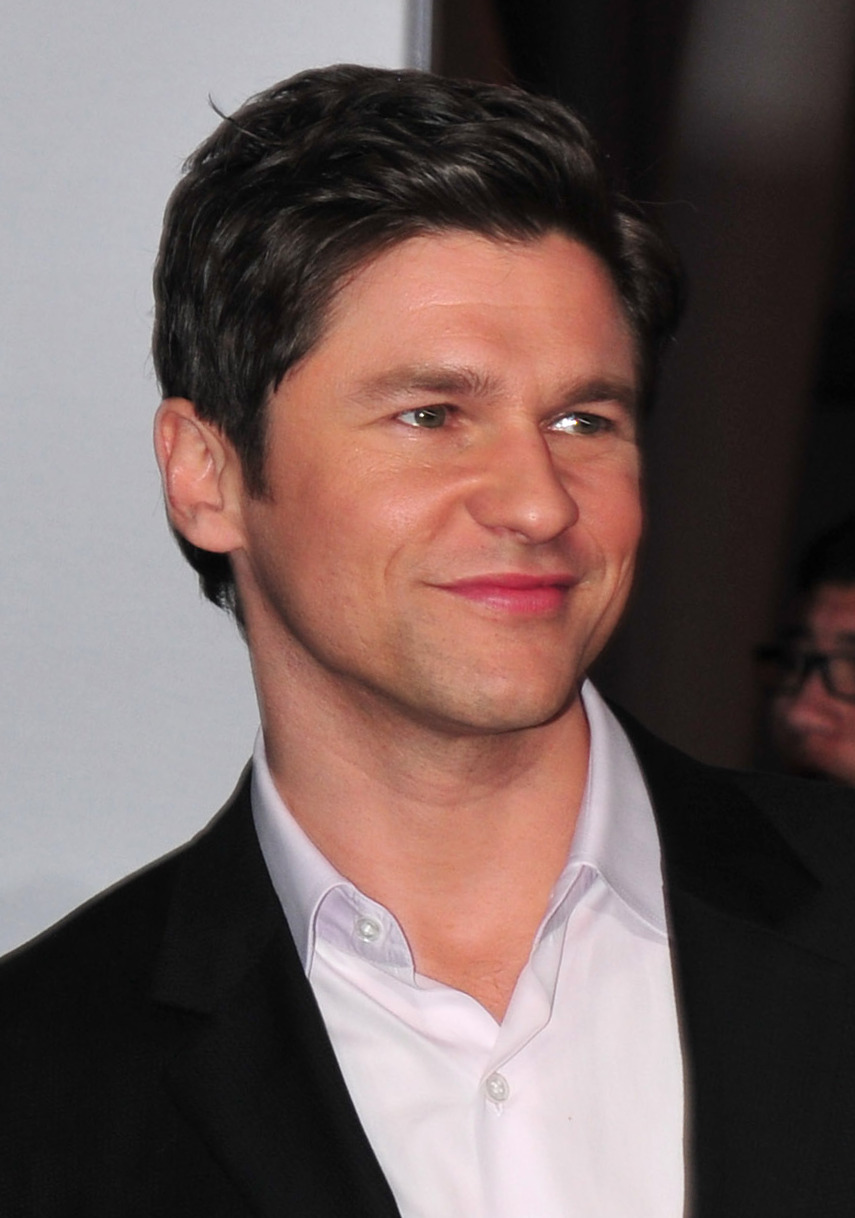
David Burtka

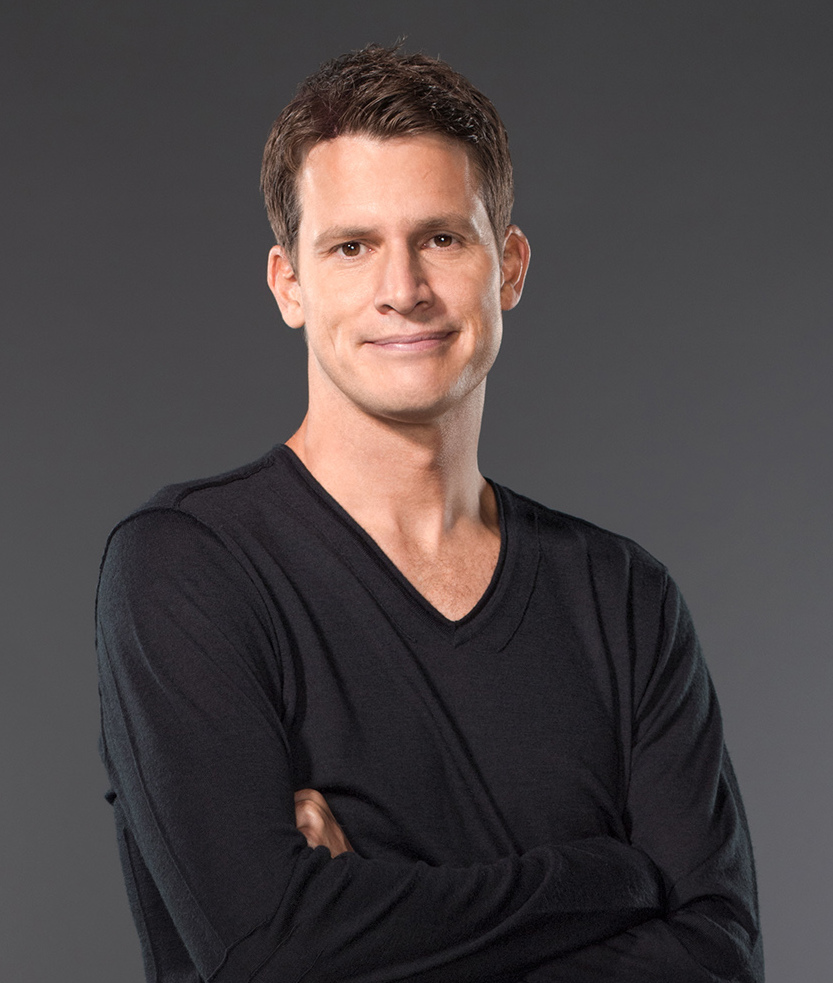
Daniel Tosh

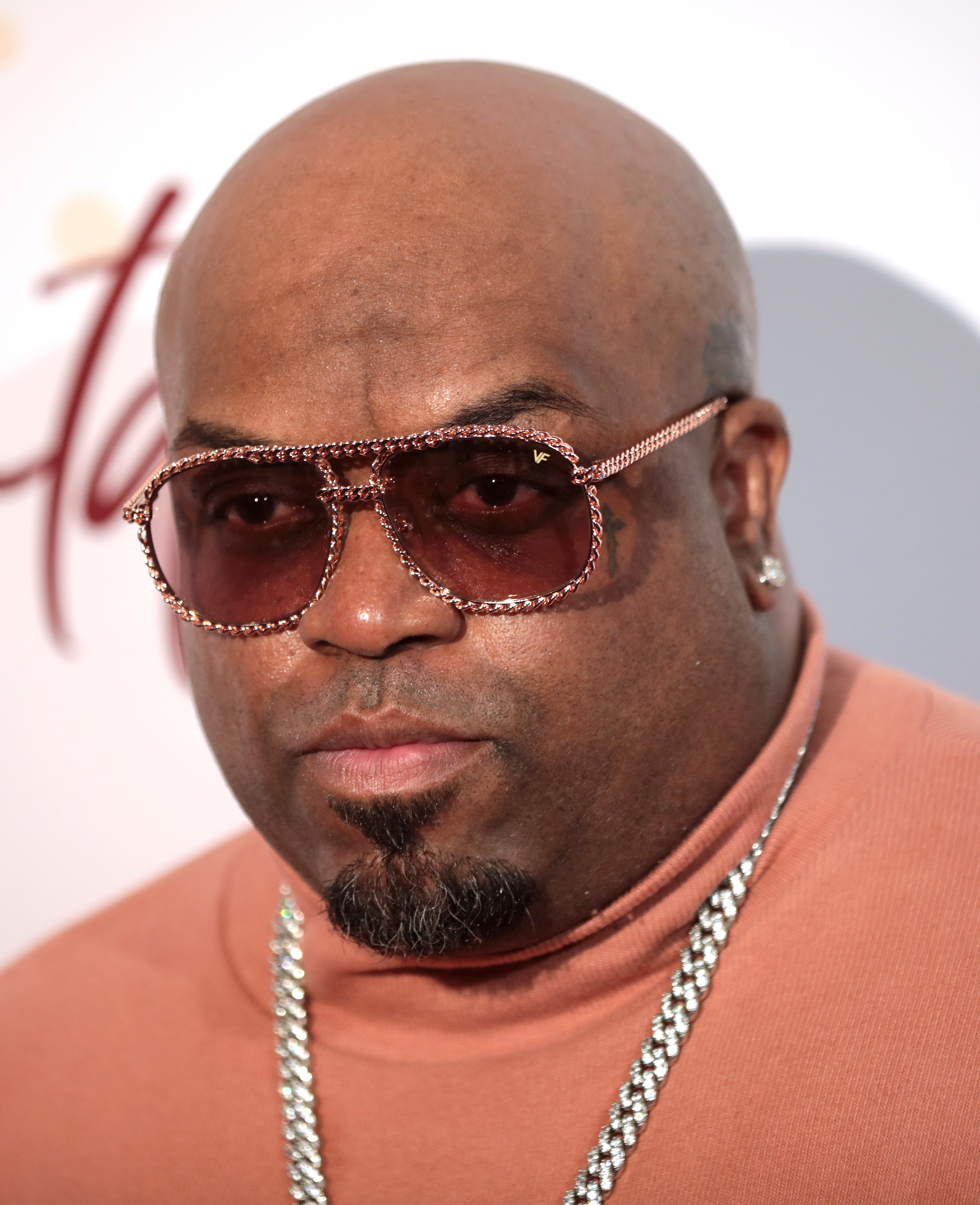
CeeLo Green

- May 1
  - Jason Barickman, politician
  - Bob Boldon, basketball player and coach
- May 2 – Kate Baldwin, singer and actress
- May 3
  - Christina Hendricks, actress
  - Dulé Hill, actor and tap dancer
  - Kimora Lee Simmons, fashion designer
- May 4 – Andy Khachaturian, drummer for System of a Down (1994–1997)
- May 6
  - Jesse Bering, psychologist, writer, and academic
  - Eric Boguniecki, ice hockey player
- May 7 – Big Noyd, rapper
- May 8
  - Dan Andelman, radio host
  - Nathan Buttke, stock car racing driver
  - Truth Martini, wrestler
- May 9 – Lane Kiffin, football player and coach
- May 10
  - Andrea Anders, actress
  - Julie Nathanson, actress and voice actress
- May 11
  - Coby Bell, actor
  - David Fierro, actor and director
- May 12
  - Romina Arena, Italian-born popera singer/songwriter
  - Lawrence Phillips, American-born Canadian football player (d. 2016)
  - Jared Polis, politician, 43rd Governor of Colorado
- May 13
  - Brad Bohannon, basketball player and coach
  - Mickey Callaway, baseball player and coach
  - Michael Cloud, politician
  - Brian Geraghty, actor
- May 14
  - Rashid Atkins, basketball player
  - Sean Bielat, businessman and political candidate
- May 15 – Ray Lewis, football player
- May 17
  - Richard H. Blake, actor and singer
  - James Brown, football player
- May 18
  - Flozell Adams, football player
  - Joe Bunn, basketball player
  - Jack Johnson, singer/songwriter
- May 19 – London Fletcher, football player
- May 20
  - Andrew Sega, musician
  - Marc Thompson, voice actor
- May 21 – John David Anderson, writer
- May 22
  - Jedediah Aaker, musician
  - AverySunshine, singer/songwriter and pianist
- May 23 – LaMonica Garrett, actor and slamball player
- May 24
  - Jamie Baldridge, photographer and educator
  - Alex Lacamoire, musical arranger
- May 26
  - Nicki Aycox, actress and musician (d. 2022)
  - Lauryn Hill, actress, singer/songwriter, rapper and producer
- May 27
  - André 3000, musician, record producer, actor, and member of Outkast
  - Jenny Oaks Baker, violinist
  - David James Boyd, writer, composer, and lyricist
  - DJ Colette, disc jockey and singer
- May 28 – DJ EFN, record label executive and DJ
- May 29
  - Matt Bryant, football player
  - David Burtka, actor and professional chef
  - Daniel Tosh, comedian
- May 30
  - Brian Fair, singer and frontman for Shadows Fall
  - CeeLo Green, singer/songwriter, television personality, and frontman for Gnarls Barkley

=== June ===
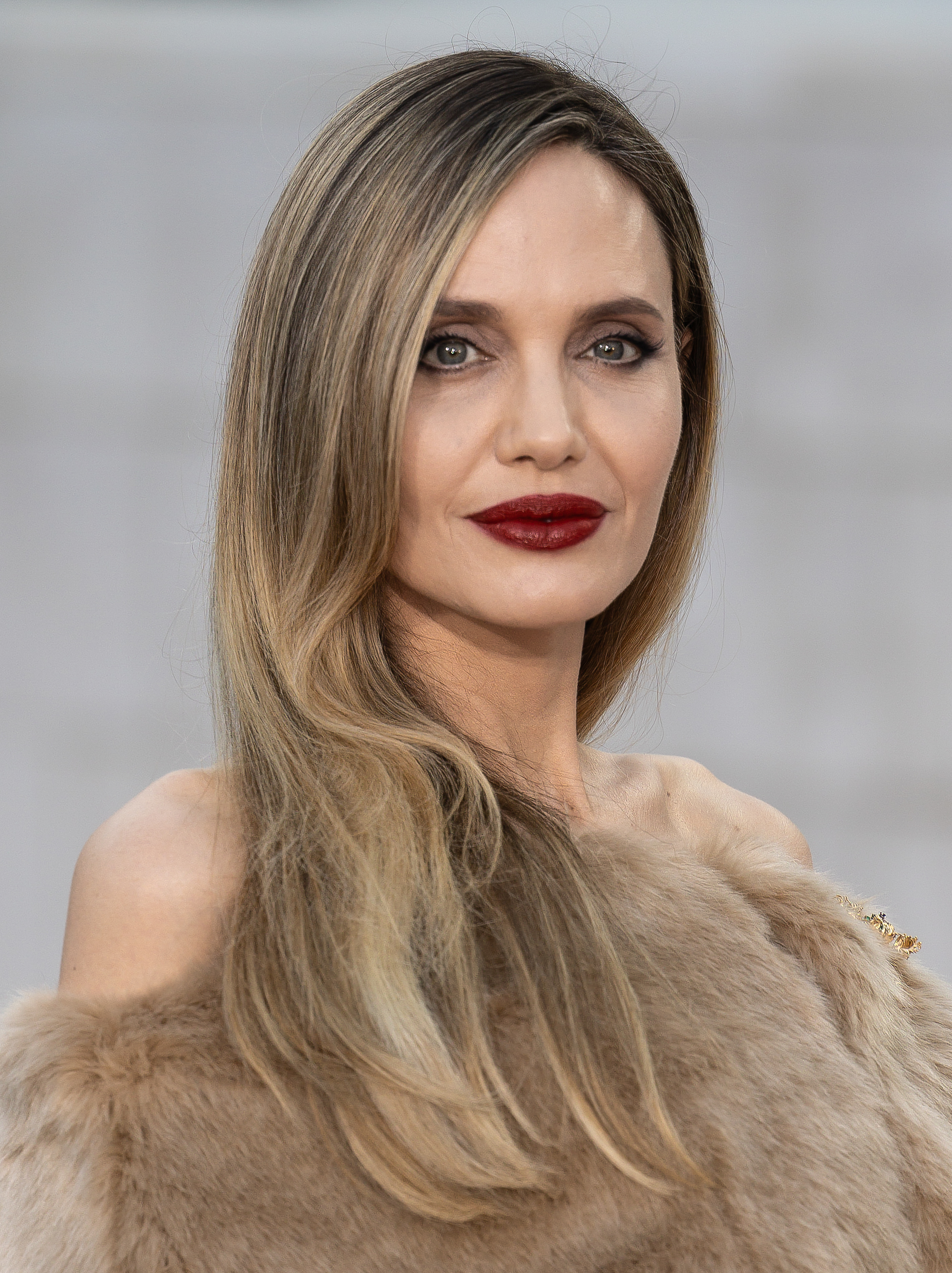
Angelina Jolie

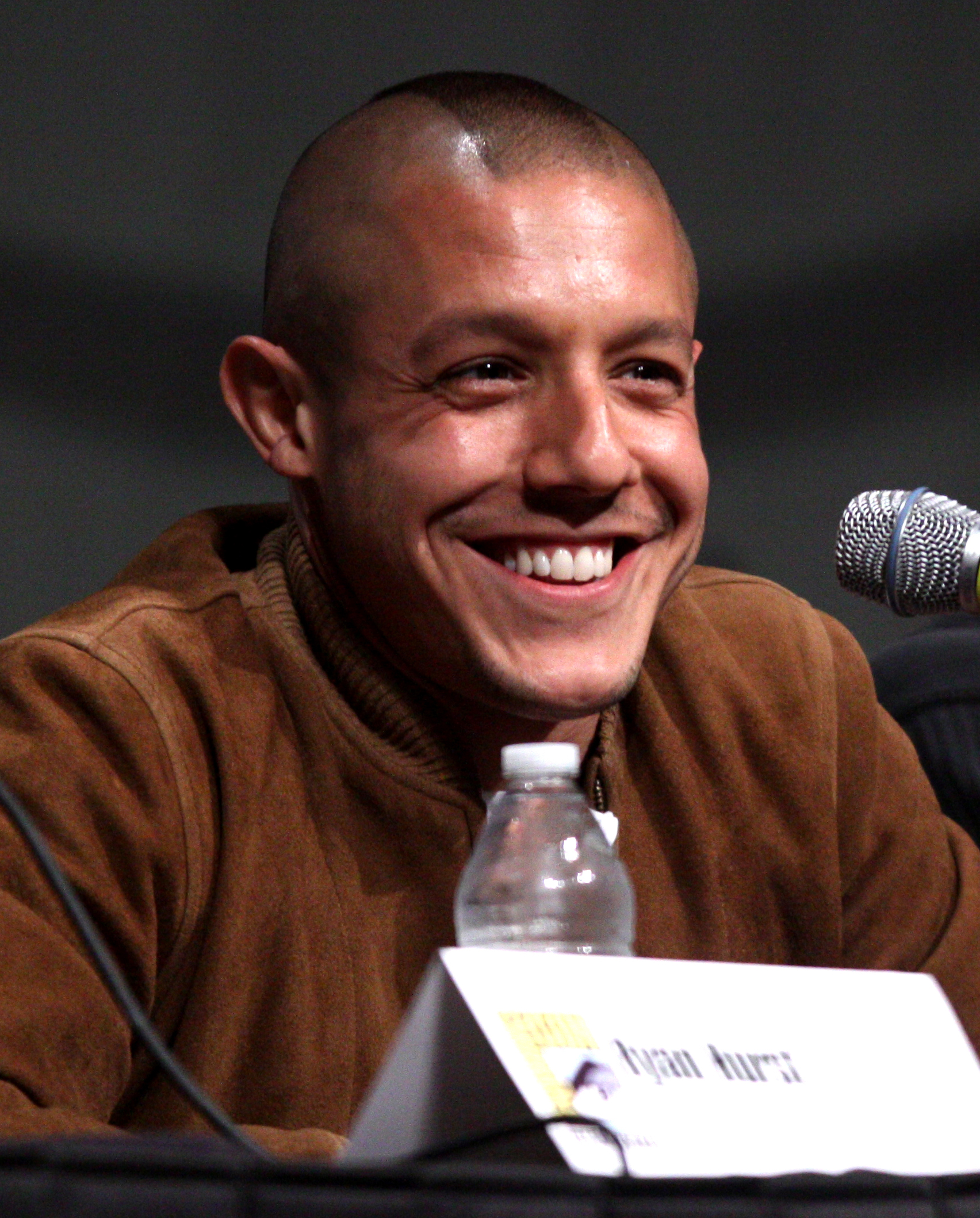
Theo Rossi

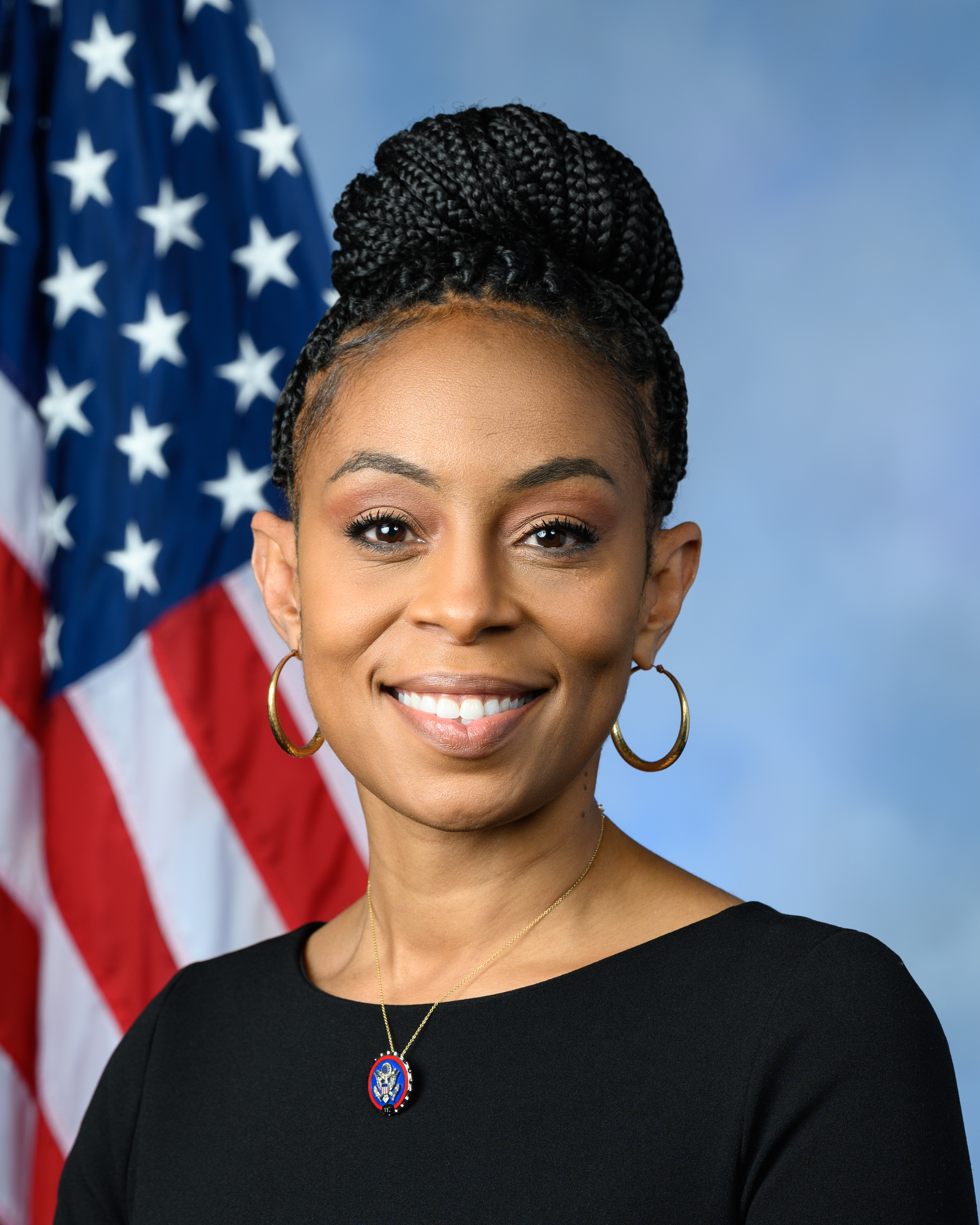
Shontel Brown

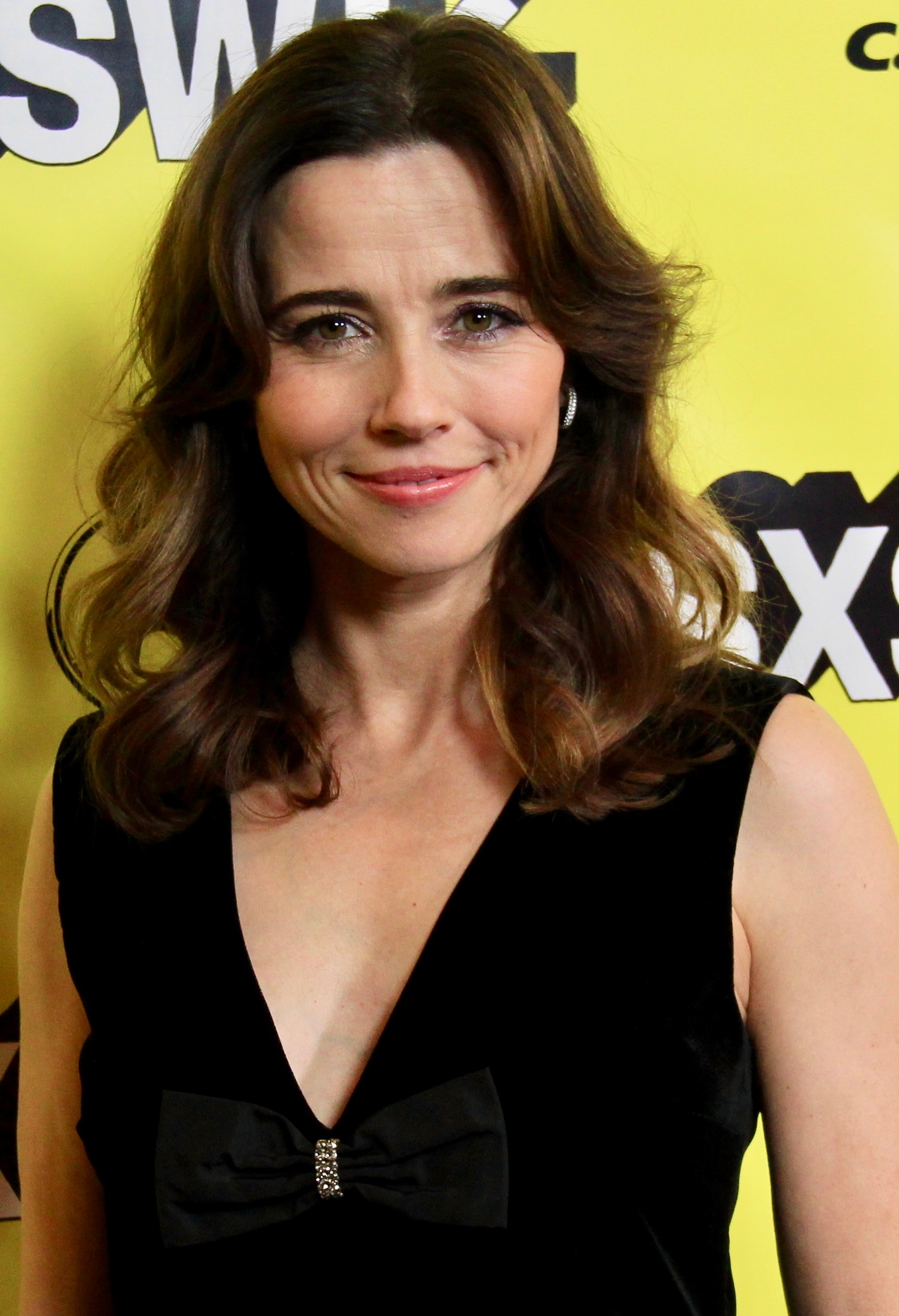
Linda Cardellini

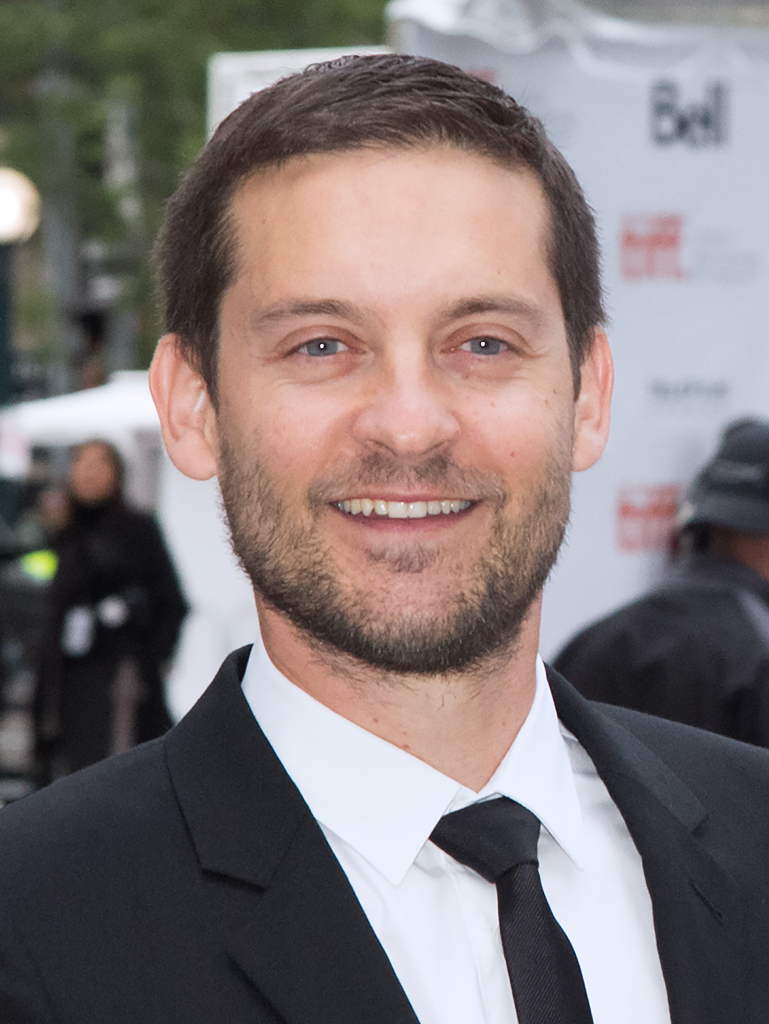
Tobey Maguire

- June 1
  - John Barresi, sport kite flier
  - Bryan Konietzko, animator
- June 2 – Zia McCabe, keyboardist for The Dandy Warhols
- June 3
  - Erick Erickson, radio host
  - Amy McGrath, Marine fighter pilot and political candidate
- June 4
  - Nikki Araguz, same-sex marriage activist, author, and public speaker (died 2019)
  - Henry Burris, football player and coach
  - Angelina Jolie, actress and director
  - Theo Rossi, actor and producer
- June 5 – Scott Holroyd, actor
- June 6 – Eugene Vindman, Ukrainian-born politician and Army Lt. Colonel
- June 7
  - Brian Alford, football player
  - Jason Brodeur, politician
  - Allen Iverson, basketball player
- June 8 – Michael Buckley, YouTube personality
- June 10 – Nicole Bilderback, South Korean-born actress
- June 12 – Bryan Alvarez, wrestler, martial artist, satellite radio host, podcaster, and journalist
- June 14 – Rob Bohlinger, football player
- June 15
  - Jim Bridenstine, politician
  - C. J. Brown, soccer player and coach
- June 16 – Frederick Koehler, actor
- June 17 – Mark Brownson, baseball player (d. 2017)
- June 19
  - Anthony Parker, basketball player
  - Geoff Ramsey, voice actor and producer, co-founder of Rooster Teeth
- June 20
  - Nate Bjorkgren, basketball coach
  - Eric Schmitt, politician
- June 21
  - Greg Bellisari, football player
  - Oscar Wood, wrestler
- June 22
  - Leraldo Anzaldua, voice actor, director, scriptwriter, and stunt coordinator
  - Jeff Hephner, actor
- June 23 – Alisa Burras, basketball player
- June 24
  - Vanessa Atterbeary, politician
  - Shontel Brown, politician
  - Dan Browne, Olympic sprinter
  - Carla Gallo, actress
  - Christie Pearce, soccer player
- June 25 – Linda Cardellini, actress
- June 27
  - Bill Beckwith, carpenter and television personality (d. 2013)
  - Tobey Maguire, actor and producer
- June 28 – Cyron Brown, football player

=== July ===
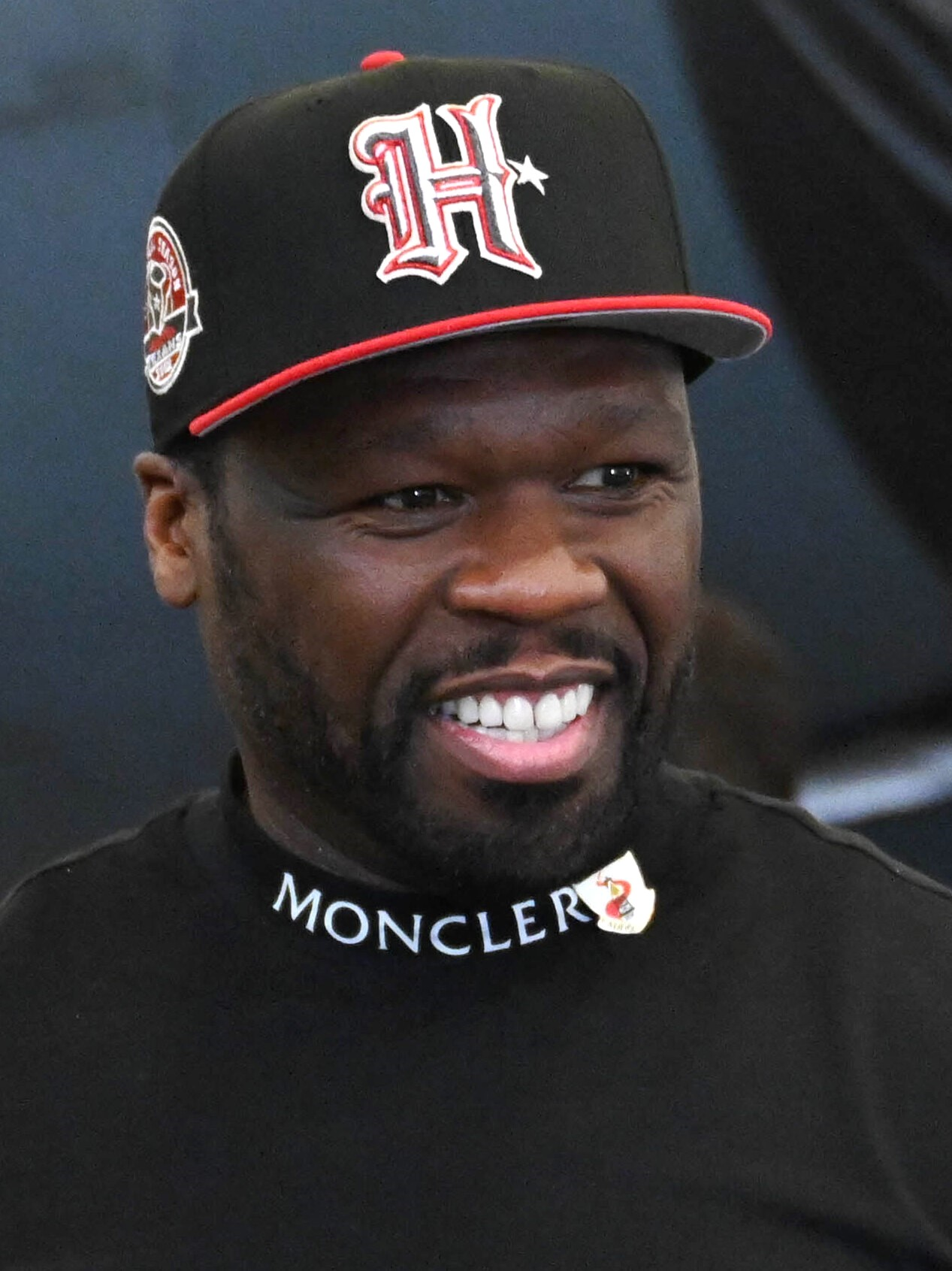
50 Cent

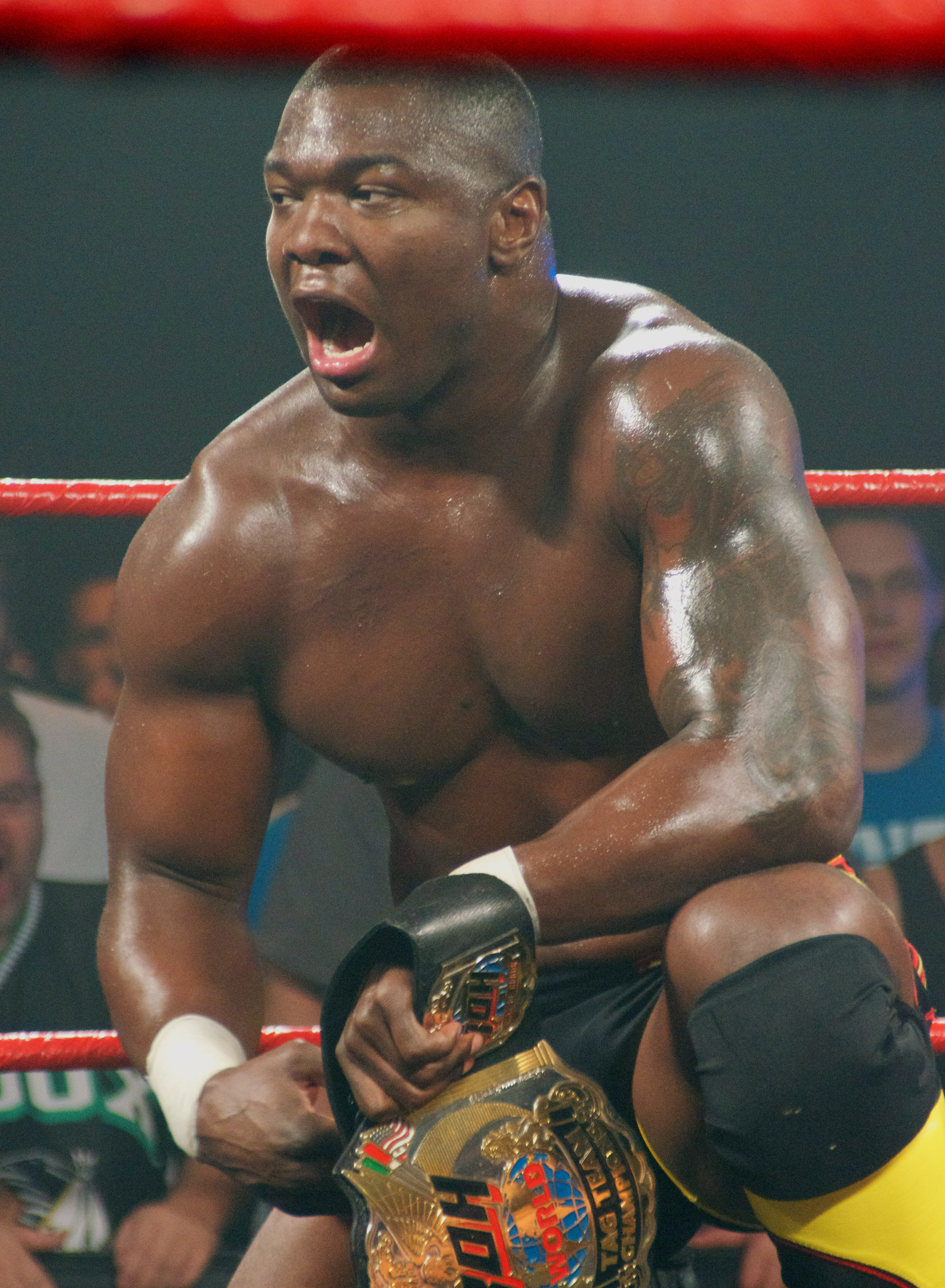
Shelton Benjamin

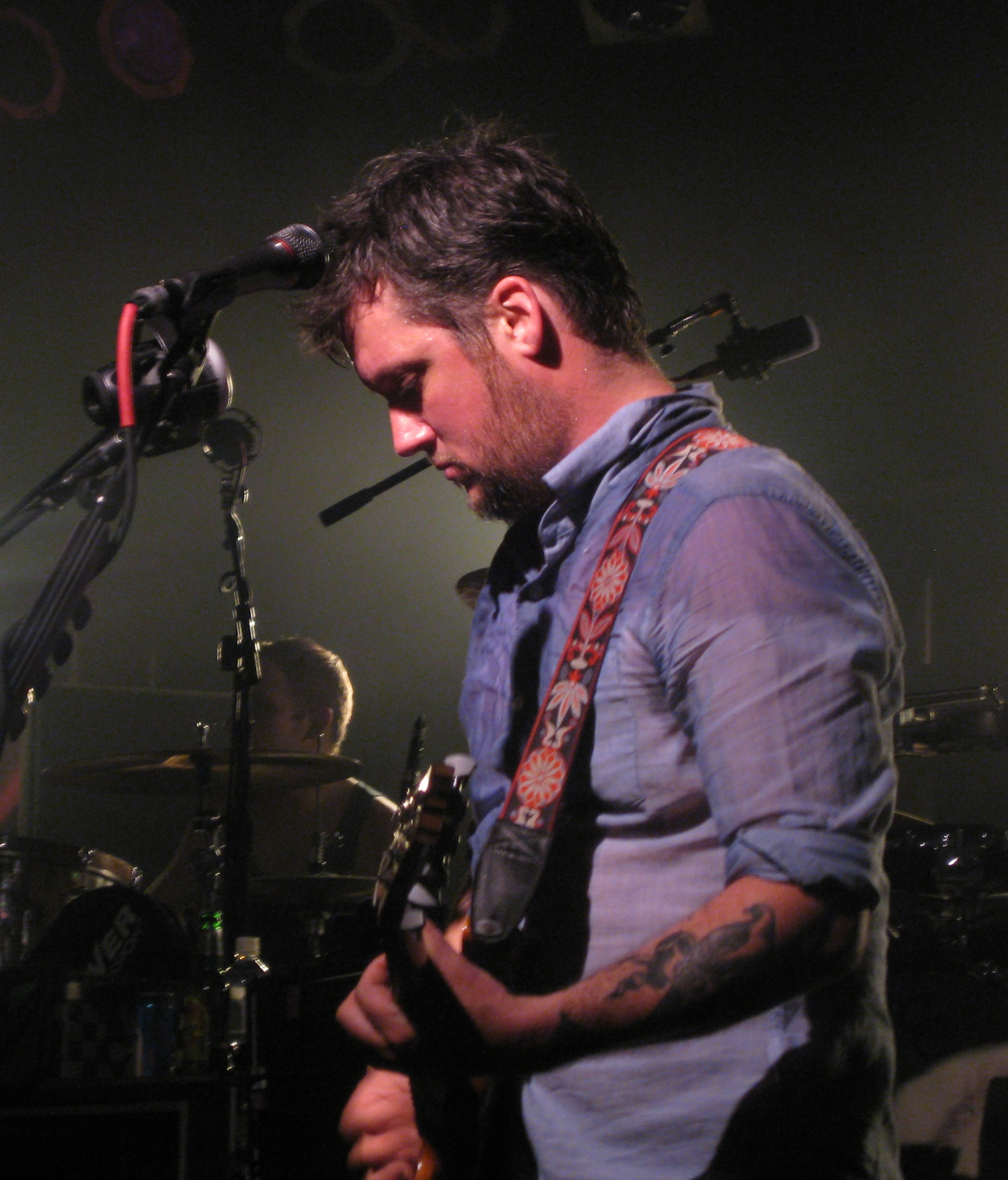
Isaac Brock

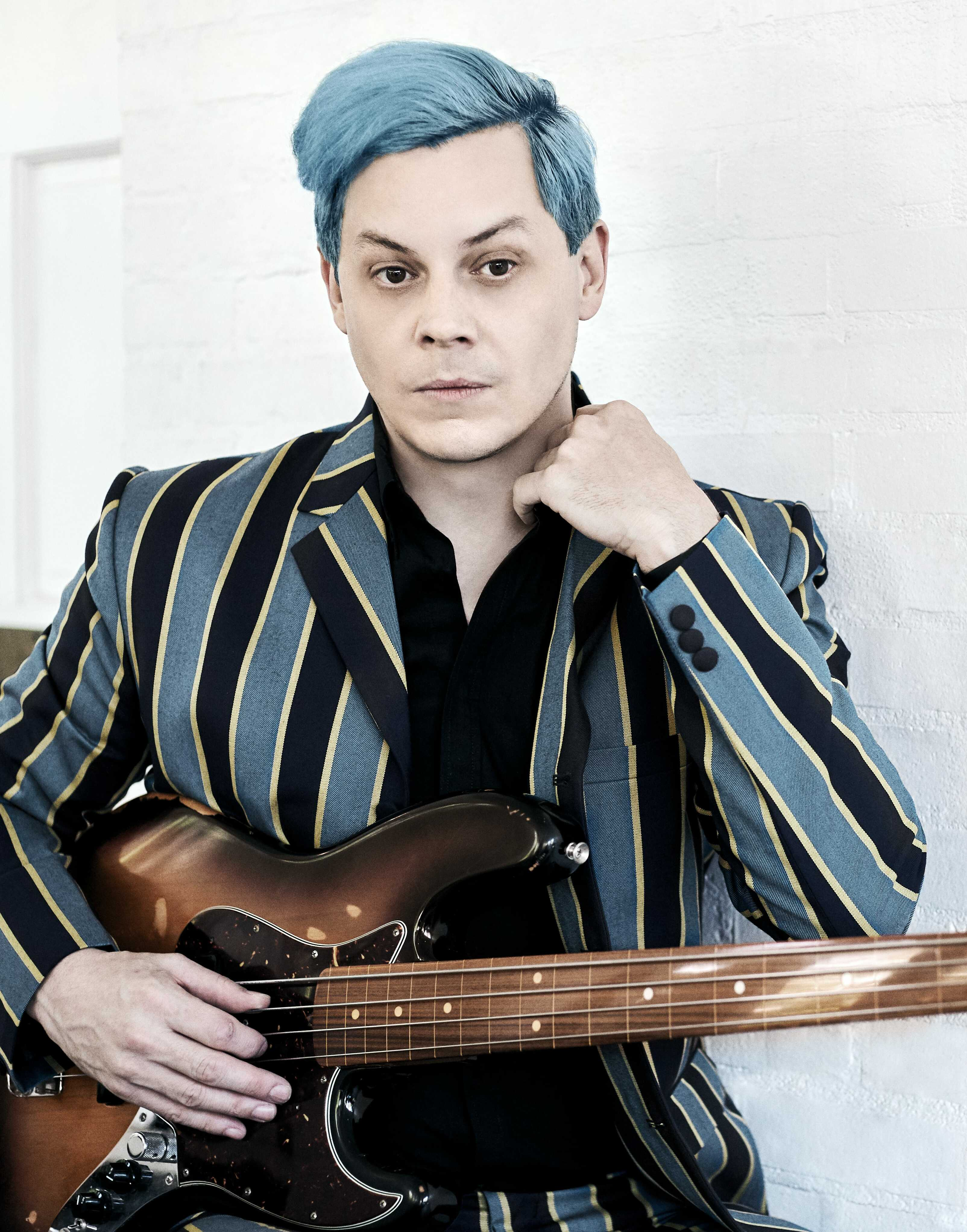
Jack White

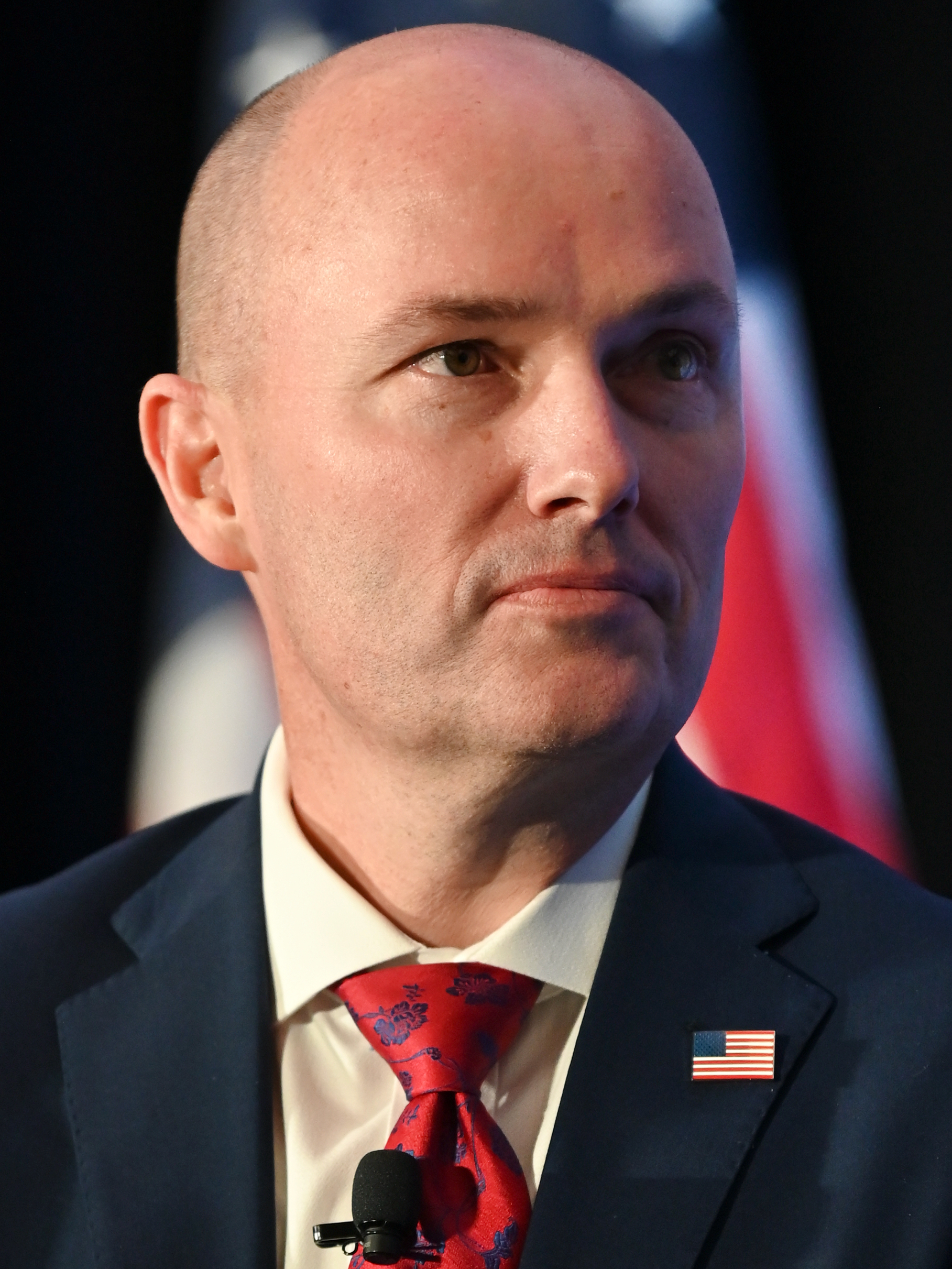
Spencer Cox

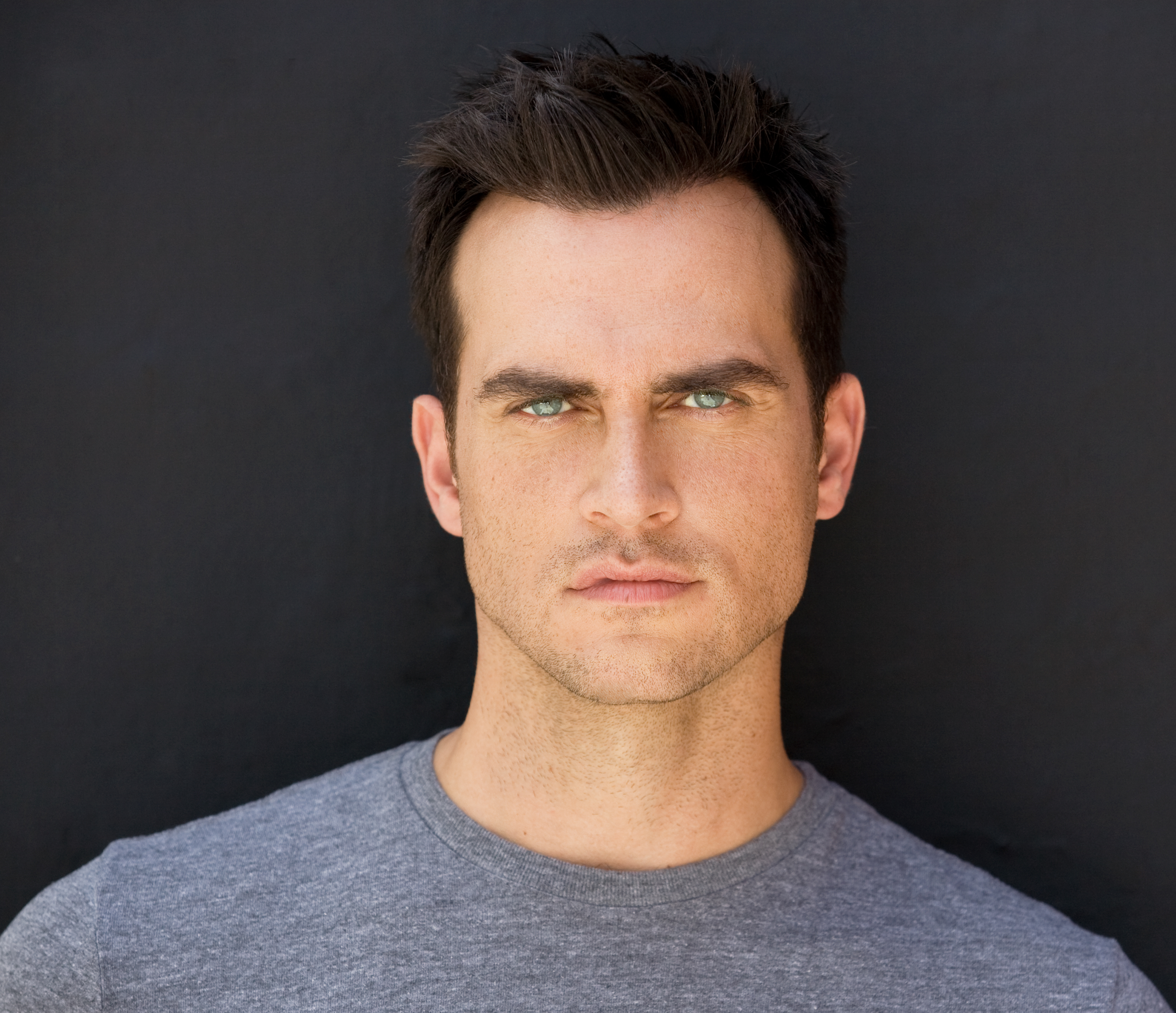
Cheyenne Jackson

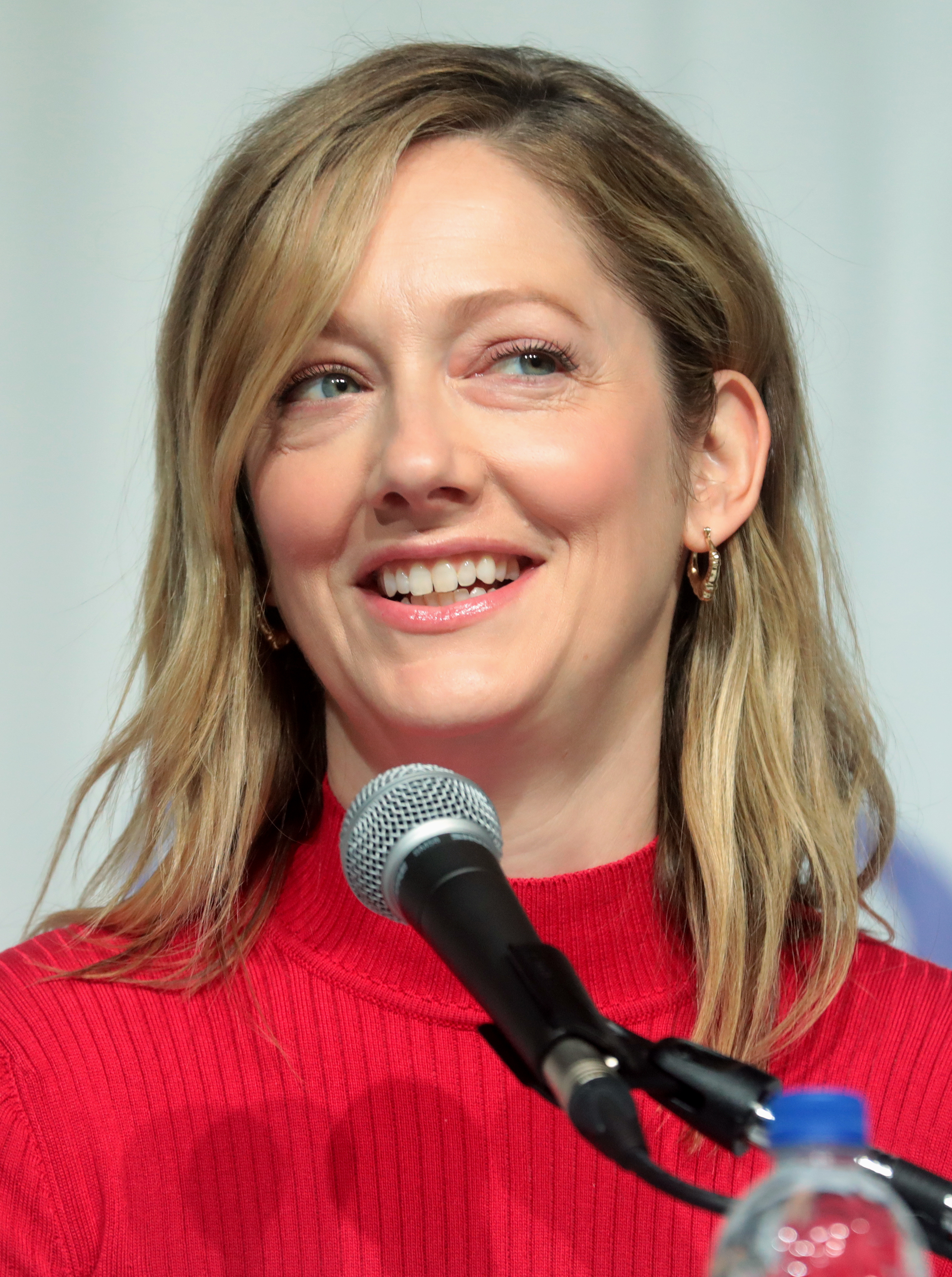
Judy Greer

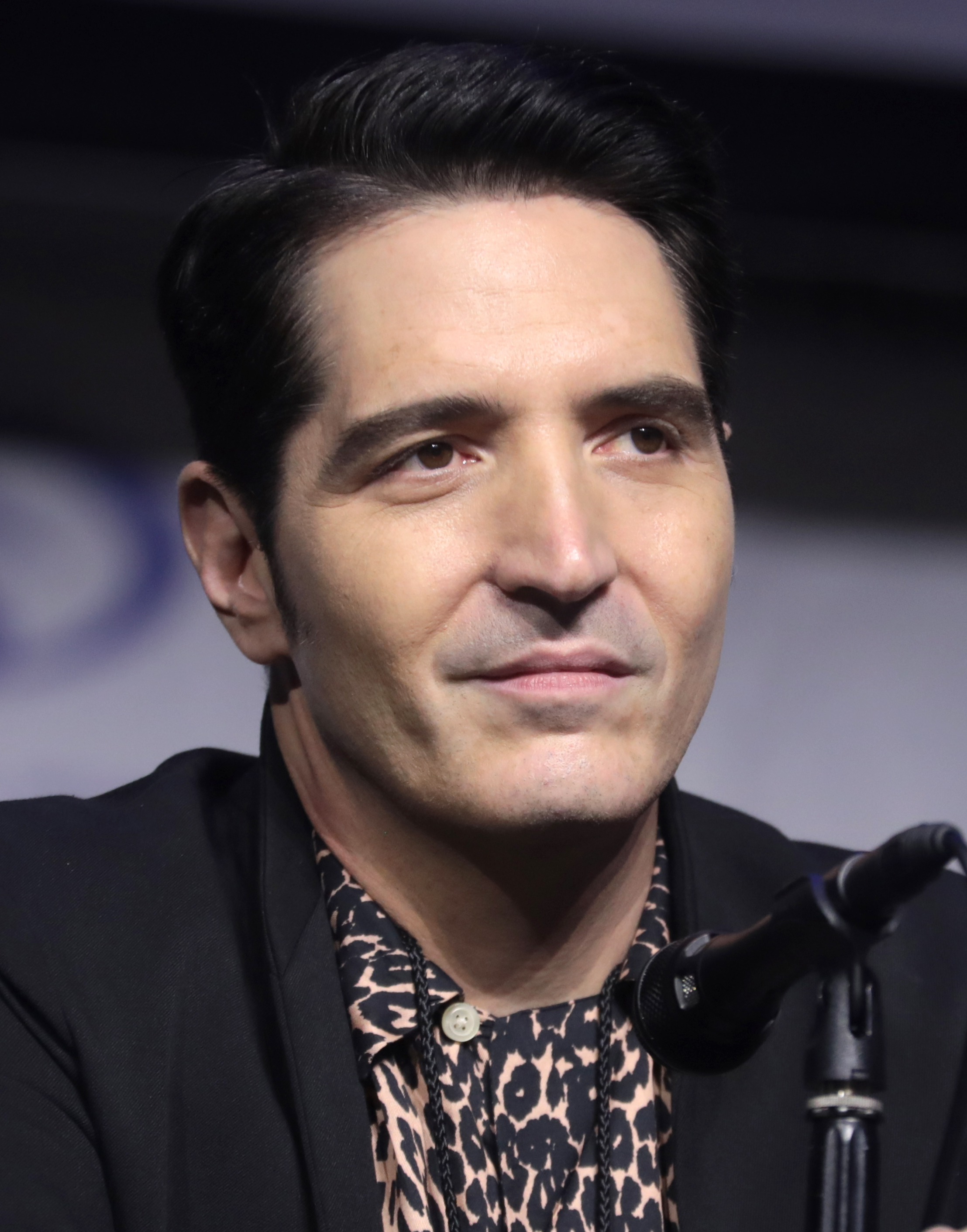
David Dastmalchian

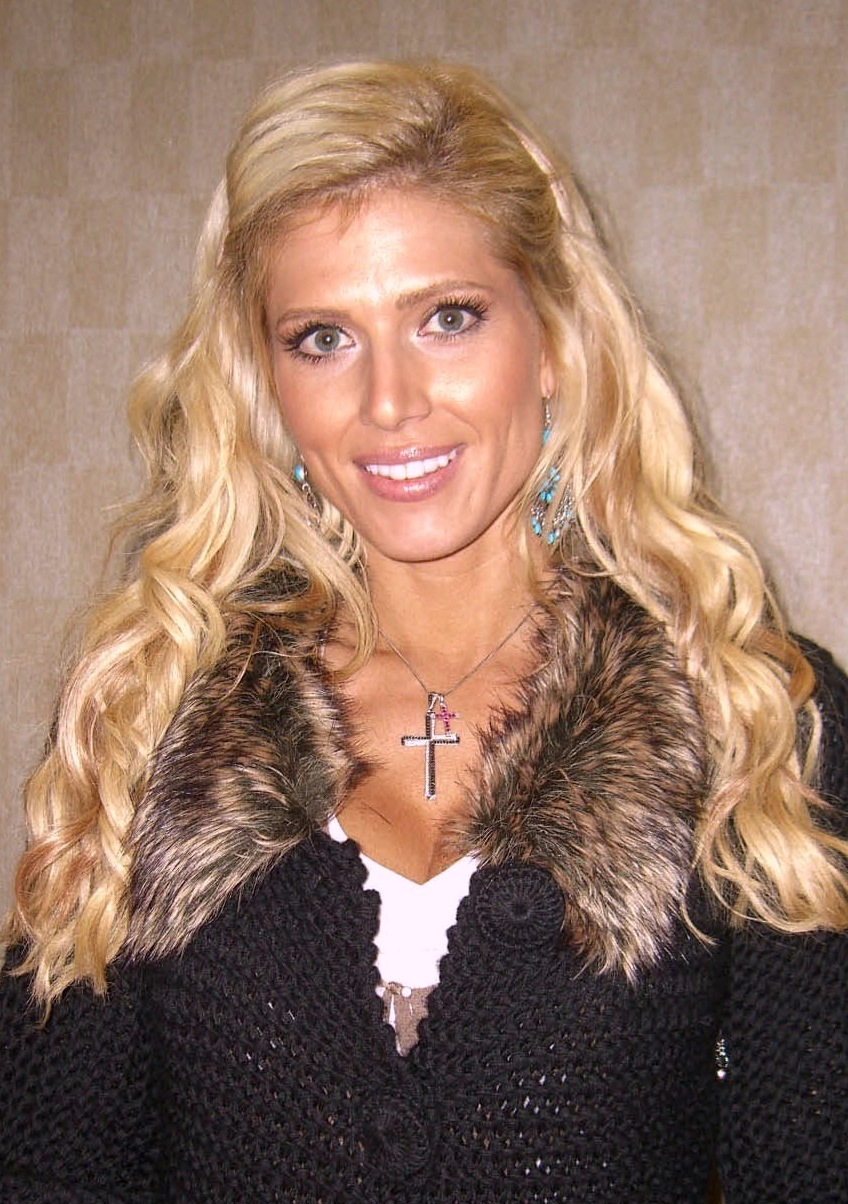
Torrie Wilson

- July 1
  - Koichi Fukuda, Japanese-born guitarist for Static-X
  - Tobias Read, politician
  - Sufjan Stevens, musician
- July 2
  - Sheri Bueter Hauser, soccer player
  - Elizabeth Reaser, actress
- July 3 – Ryan McPartlin, actor
- July 4
  - Keith R. Blackwell, judge
  - John Lloyd Young, actor and singer
- July 5
  - Sope Aluko, Nigerian-born British-American actress
  - Mike Richards, television producer, game show host, and television personality
- July 6
  - 50 Cent, rapper, actor, and businessman
  - Nate Barlow, director, actor, screenwriter, and producer
- July 7
  - Tony Benshoof, Olympic luger
  - Jason Brilz, mixed martial artist
  - DJ Green Lantern, DJ and producer
- July 8 – Jamal Woolard, actor and rapper
- July 9
  - Shelton Benjamin, wrestler
  - Will Blackwell, football player
  - Isaac Brock, singer/songwriter, guitarist, and frontman for Modest Mouse
  - Robert Koenig, director and producer
  - Jack White, singer and guitarist, frontman for The White Stripes
- July 11
  - Bridgette Andersen, actress (d. 1997)
  - Willie Anderson, football player
  - Spencer Cox, politician, 18th Governor of Utah
  - Jon Wellner, actor
- July 12
  - Rich Barcelo, golfer
  - Jason Bellini, journalist
  - Cheyenne Jackson, actor and singer
- July 13 – Danni Boatwright, actress, host, sports journalist, model, and beauty queen
- July 14
  - Amy Acuff, Olympic high jumper
  - Taboo, musician
- July 17
  - Daffney, wrestler, manager, and actress (died 2021)
  - Carey Hart, off-road truck racer and motorcycle racer
  - Terence Tao, Australian-born mathematician
- July 18
  - Bleu, musician, singer/songwriter, and record producer
  - Torii Hunter, baseball player
  - Daron Malakian, guitarist and vocalist for System of a Down
- July 19
  - Heather Armstrong, blogger (d. 2023)
  - Patricia Ja Lee, actress and model
  - John Valdivia, politician, mayor of San Bernardino, California (2018–2022)
- July 20
  - Ray Allen, basketball player
  - Judy Greer, actress and author
  - Jason Raize, actor and activist (d. 2004)
- July 21
  - Larry Atkins, football player
  - Christopher Barzak, author
  - Diego Buñuel, French-born filmmaker
  - David Dastmalchian, actor
- July 22
  - Justi Baumgardt, soccer player
  - Nikki Boyer, actress and singer/songwriter
- July 24
  - Jamie Langenbrunner, ice hockey player
  - Eric Szmanda, actor
  - Torrie Wilson, wrestler and model
- July 25
  - Dallas Jenkins, director, writer, and producer
  - Sara Rodriguez, politician, 46th Lieutenant Governor of Wisconsin
- July 26 – Kevin Barker, baseball player and analyst
- July 27
  - Brad Barr, guitarist and singer/songwriter
  - Shea Hillenbrand, baseball player
  - Alex Rodriguez, baseball player
- July 28
  - Huma Abedin, political staffer
  - Corey Albano, American-born Italian basketball player
  - Gerald Brown, basketball player
- July 29 – Terrence Wilkins, football player
- July 31
  - Uriah Duffy, bassist
  - Annie Parisse, actress

=== August ===
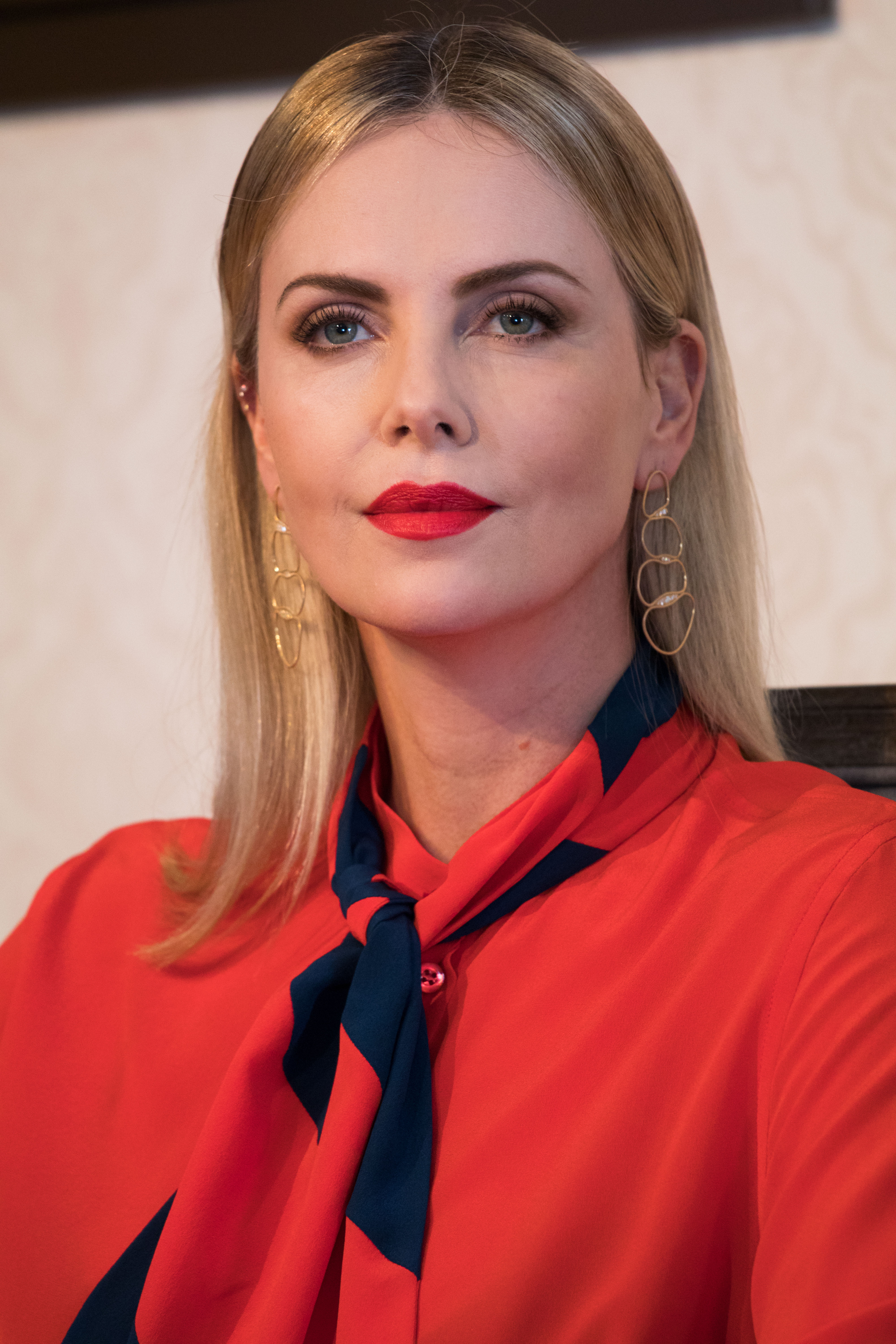
Charlize Theron

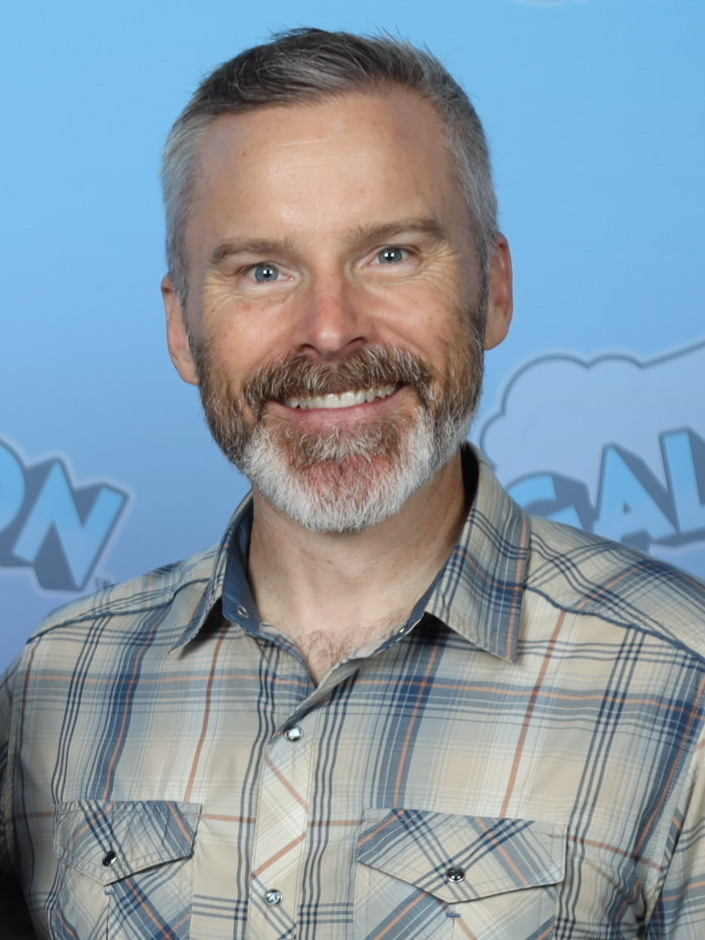
Roger Craig Smith

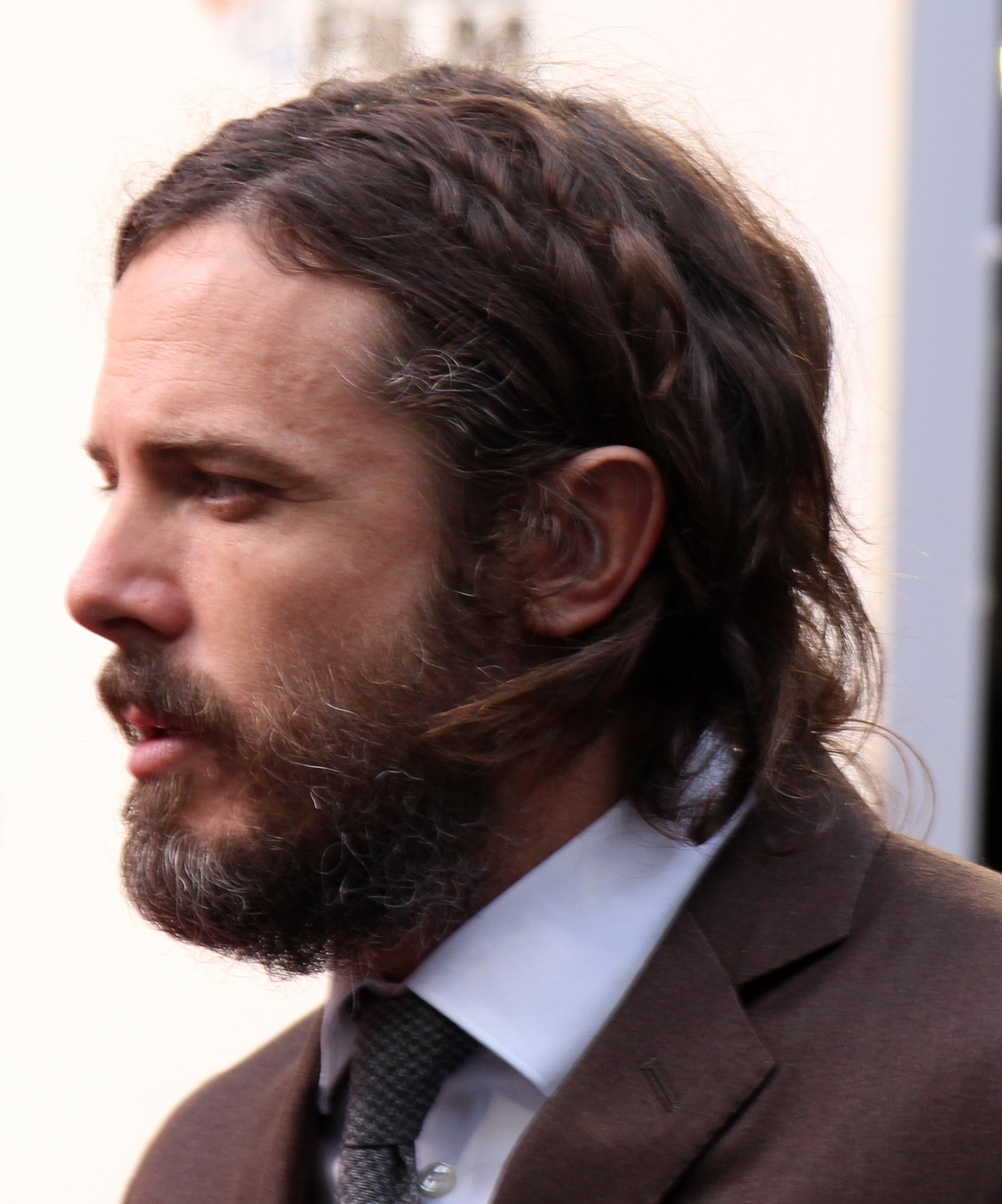
Casey Affleck

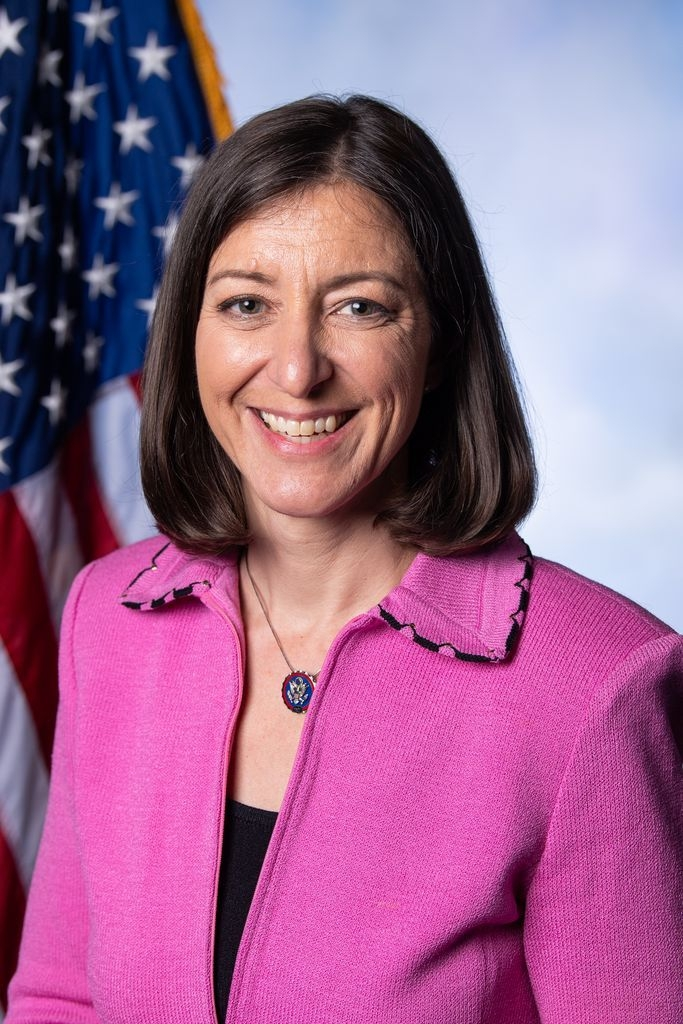
Elaine Luria

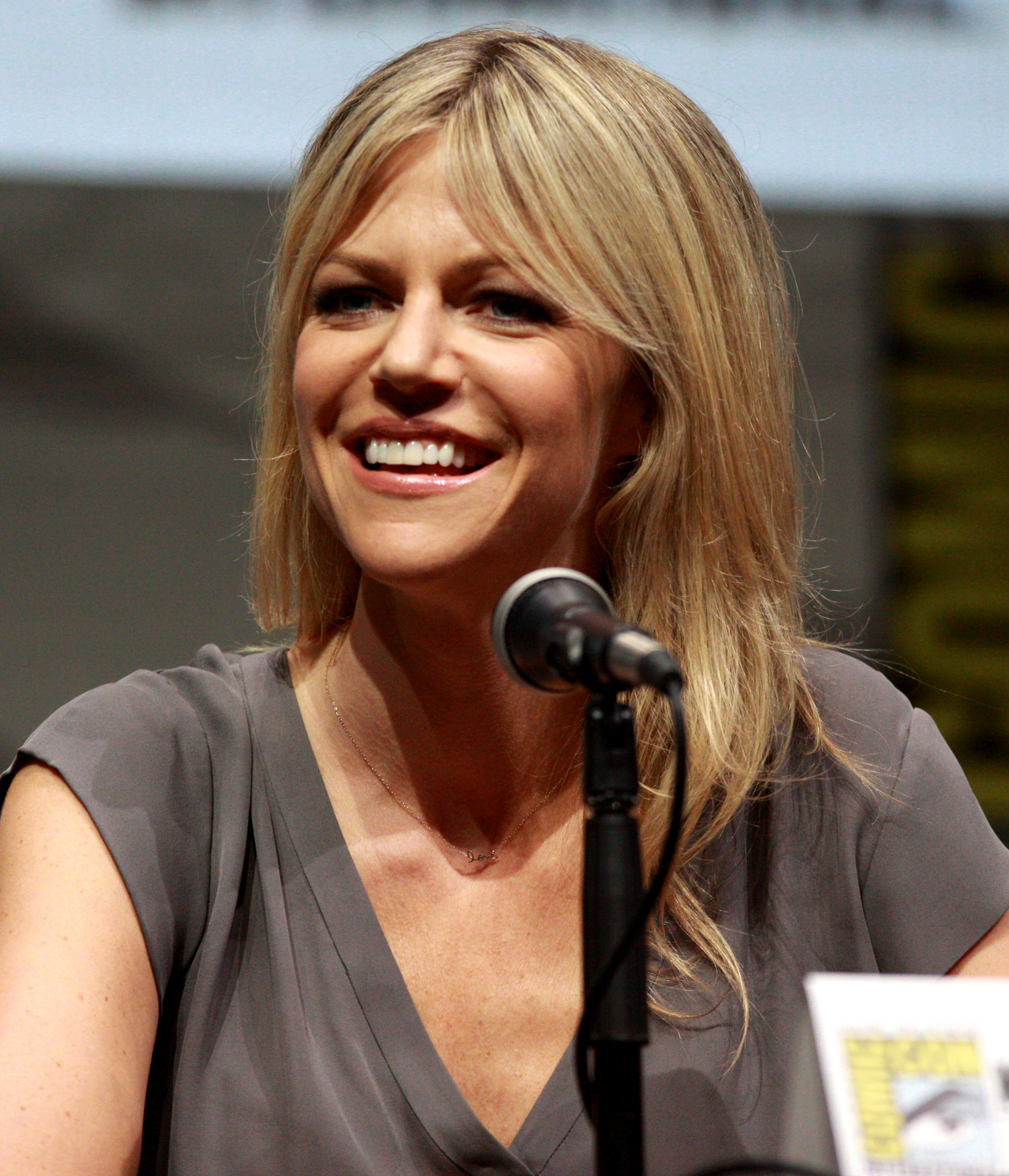
Kaitlin Olsen

- August 2
  - Fabulous Blitzkrieg, wrestler
  - Nick Loeb, businessman and actor
- August 3
  - Rosalynn Bliss, politician, mayor of Grand Rapids, Michigan
  - Roosevelt Brown, baseball player
- August 4 – Andy Hallett, singer and actor (d. 2009)
- August 6
  - Franklin DeWayne Alix, convicted rapist, robber, kidnapper, and killer (d. 2010)
  - Ryan Martinie, bassist for Mudvayne
- August 7 – Charlize Theron, South African-born actress
- August 8
  - Leon Bender, football player (d. 1998)
  - Ben Weinman, guitarist for The Dillinger Escape Plan
- August 11
  - Alex Bernstein, football player
  - Roger Craig Smith, voice actor
- August 12
  - Casey Affleck, actor and film director
  - Carter Bays, author, composer, and showrunner
- August 13
  - James Carpinello, actor
  - Andrea Gibson, poet and activist (d. 2025)
- August 14
  - Jill Bennett, actress
  - Mike Vrabel, football player and coach
- August 15
  - Wes Allen, politician
  - William Antonio, basketball player
  - Bertrand Berry, football player
  - Elaine Luria, politician
  - Kara Wolters, basketball player
- August 16
  - Shawn Clark, football player and coach (d. 2025)
  - Magic, rapper (504 Boyz and Body Head Bangerz) (d. 2013)
  - George Stults, model and actor
- August 18
  - Craig Brown, Olympic curler
  - Kaitlin Olson, actress
- August 19
  - Stuart Bishop, politician
  - Chynna Clugston, illustrator
- August 20
  - Michael Africk, singer/songwriter
  - Rob Beckley, Christian singer and frontman for Pillar
- August 21
  - Mike Altman, Olympic rower
  - Alicia Witt, actress and musician
- August 23 – Joe Andruzzi, football player
- August 27
  - Blake Adams, golfer
  - Johnny Moseley, Olympic freestyle skier and television host
- August 28
  - Ryan Bailey, Olympic water polo player
  - Eugene Byrd, actor
- August 29 – Dante Basco, actor
- August 30 – Francesco Bilotto, television design and entertaining expert
- August 31 – Sara Ramirez, actress

=== September ===
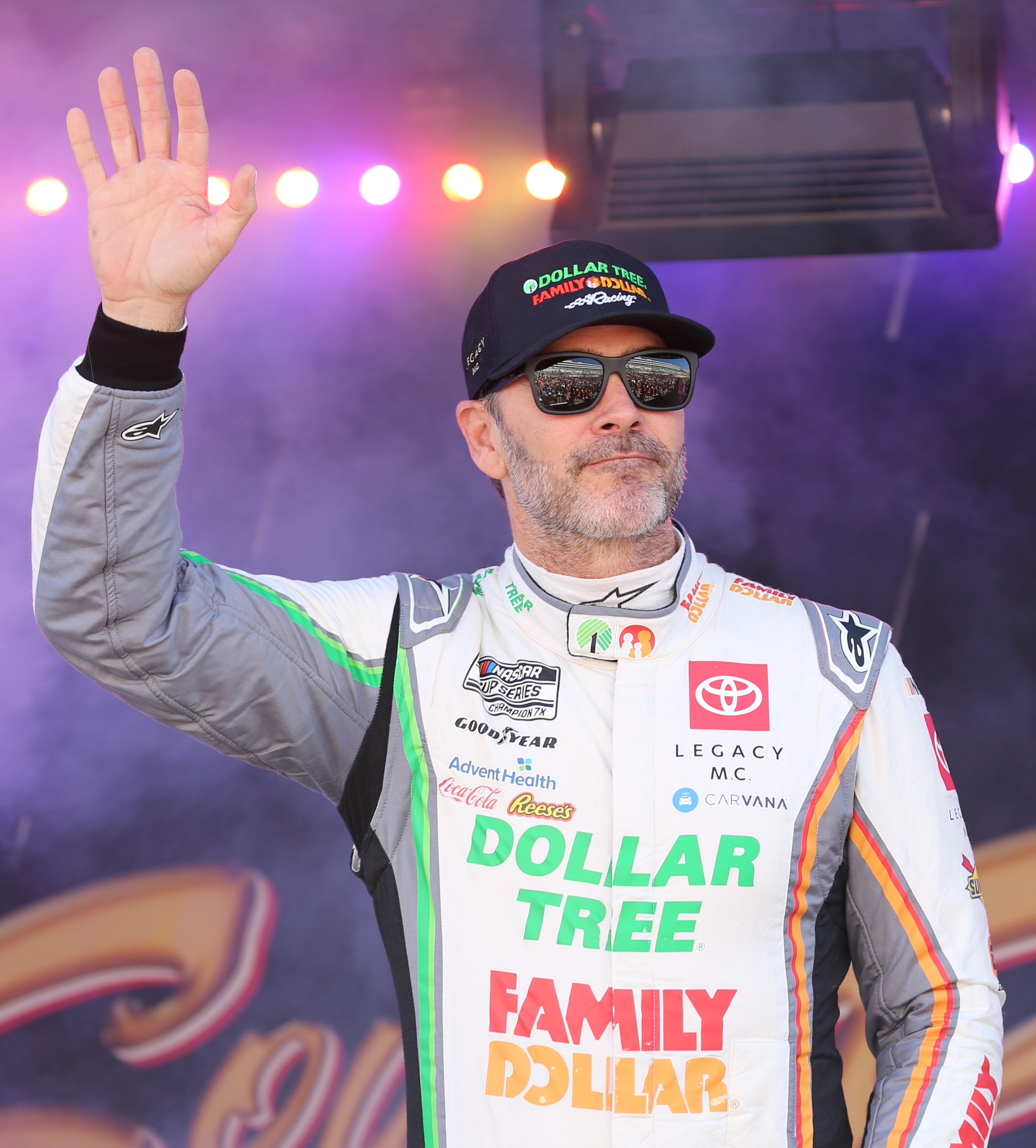
Jimmie Johnson

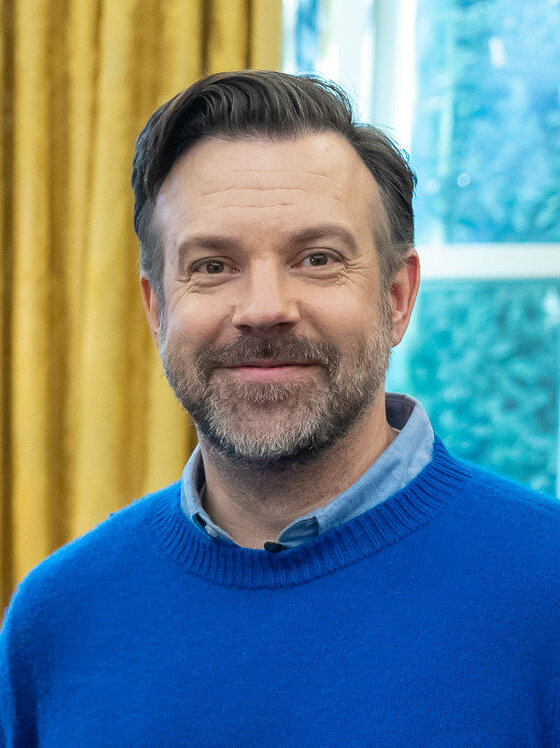
Jason Sudeikis

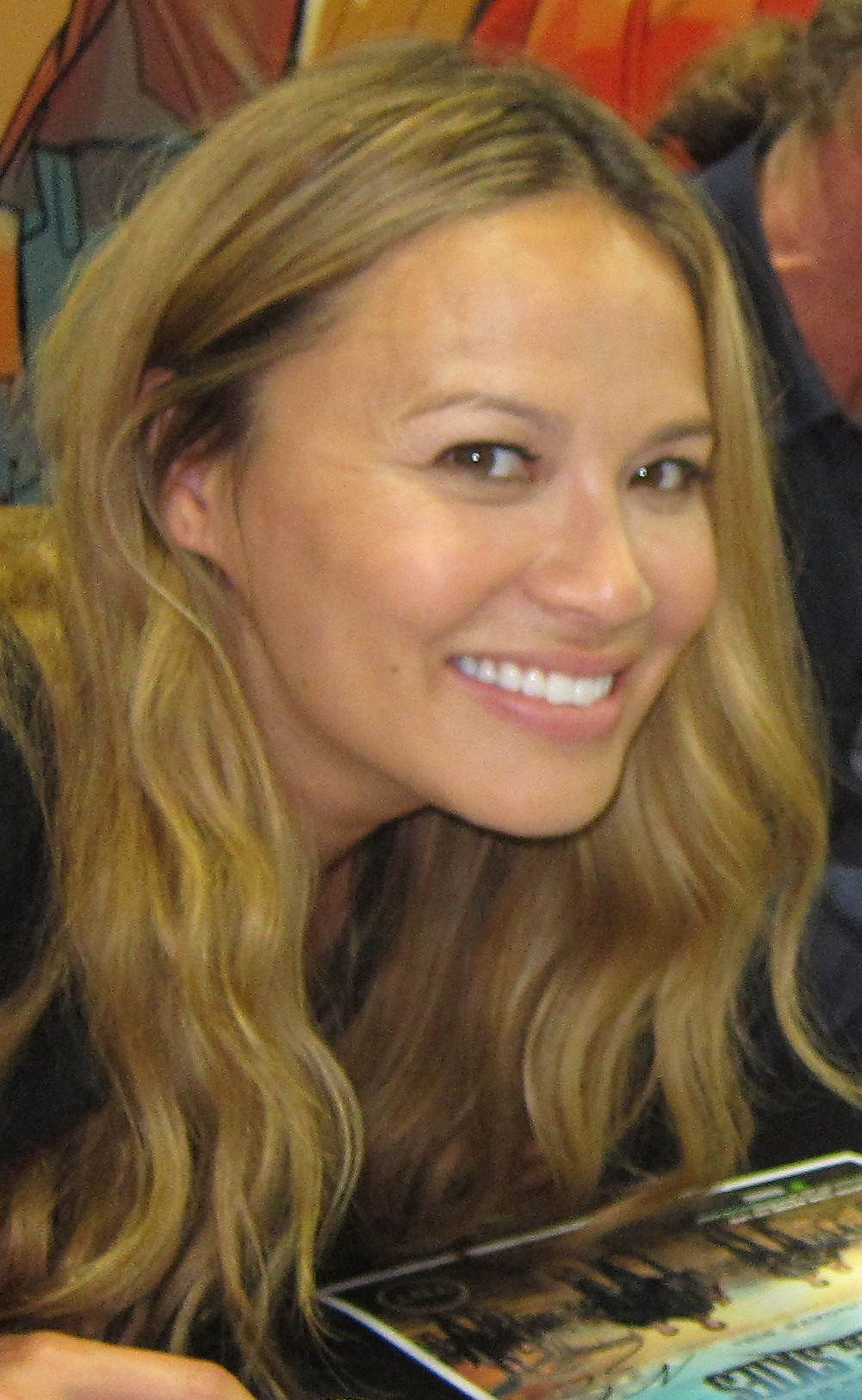
Moon Bloodgood

Matt Hasselbeck

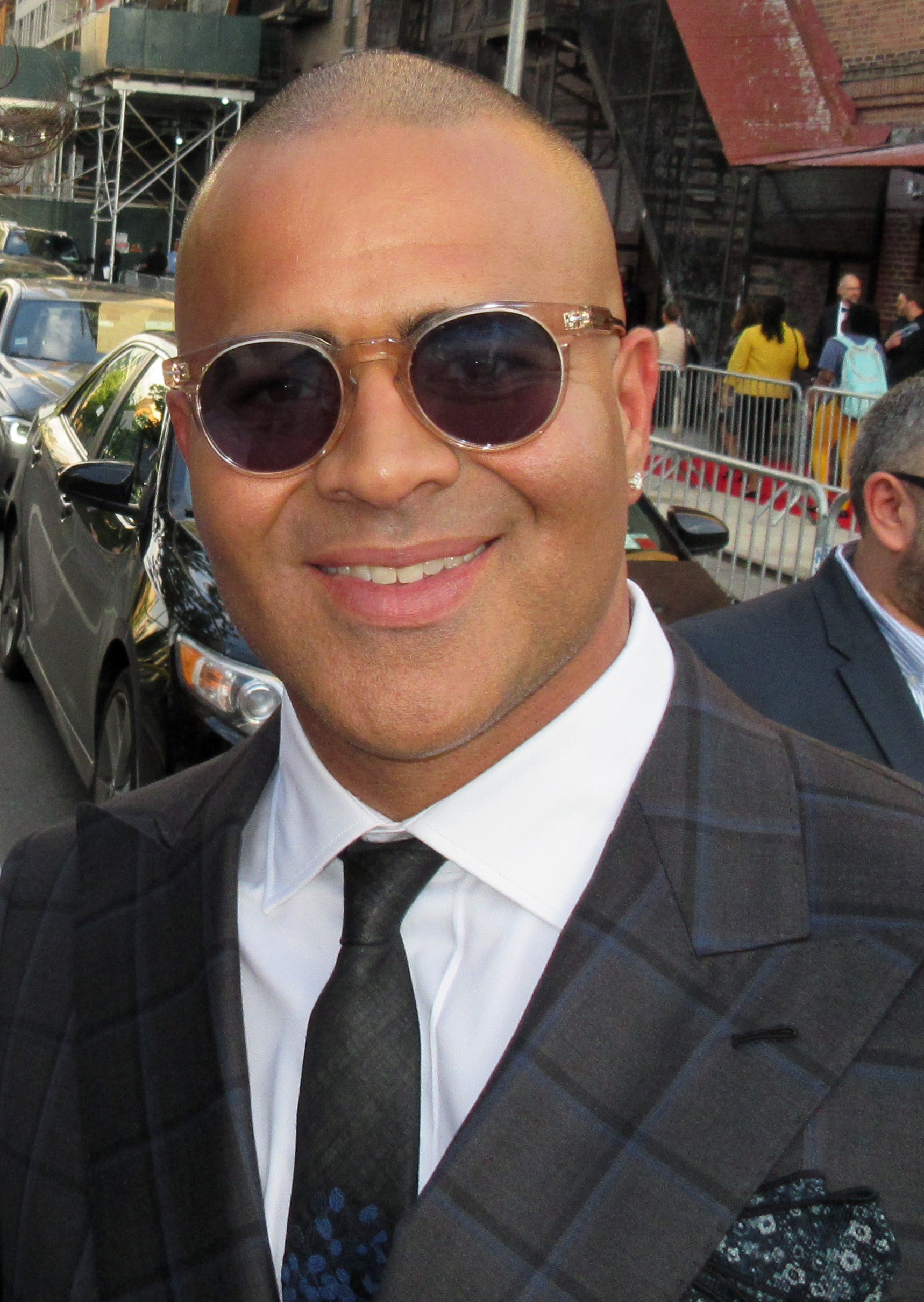
Christopher Jackson

- September 1
  - Hassan Booker, basketball player
  - Chad Brown, soccer player
  - Ammon Bundy, activist involved in the 2014 Staffoff at Bundy Ranch, leader behind the 2016 Occupation of the Malheur National Wildlife Refuge, and political candidate
  - Omar Rodríguez-López, Puerto Rican-born guitarist and songwriter
- September 2
  - Calvin Ball III, politician
  - Cory Barlog, video game designer, director, and writer
  - Carla Berube, basketball player and coach
- September 3 – Redfoo, disc jockey
- September 4 – Boondox, rapper
- September 5
  - Rod Barajas, baseball player
  - J. P. Calderon, volleyball player, model and reality show personality
- September 6 – Derrek Lee, baseball player
- September 8
  - Mike Brown, mixed martial artist
  - Larenz Tate, actor
- September 10
  - Kyle Bornheimer, actor and comedian
  - Jeff Bowler, producer
  - R. Luke DuBois, composer and artist
- September 11 – Brad Fischetti, singer and member of LFO
- September 12 – Casey Alexander, cartoonist, animator, storyboard artist, writer, director, and producer
- September 13
  - Peter Ho, American-born Taiwanese singer and actor
  - Joe Don Rooney, singer and guitarist for Rascal Flatts
- September 14 – John Haughm, singer, guitarist, and frontman for Agalloch (1996–2016) and Pillorian (2016–2019)
- September 15 – Robyn Ah Mow-Santos, Olympic volleyball player and coach
- September 16 – Jesse Aron, Elvis tribute artist
- September 17
  - Jimmie Johnson, race car driver
  - Constantine Maroulis, singer
- September 18
  - Chris Achuff, football coach
  - Charlie Finn, actor
  - Dade Phelan, politician
  - Jason Sudeikis, actor, comedian, screenwriter and producer
- September 19
  - Marty Belafsky, actor and comedian
  - Oscar Bettison, British-born composer
- September 20
  - Jim Ananich, politician
  - Moon Bloodgood, actress
- September 21
  - Elan Atias, reggae singer/songwriter
  - Chris Avery, football player
  - James Lesure, actor
  - Lil Rob, rapper, producer and actor
- September 22 – Mireille Enos, actress
- September 23
  - Jaime Bergman, model and actress
  - Lorenzo Bromell, football player
  - Dave Elder, baseball player (d. 2023)
  - Kip Pardue, actor and model
- September 24
  - Peter Abbarno, politician
  - Nick Hague, astronaut
- September 25
  - David Blair, Paralympic discus thrower
  - Matt Hasselbeck, football player
- September 27 – Jason Annicchero, soccer player
- September 28 – Mandy Barnett, country singer
- September 29 – Waraire Boswell, fashion designer and entrepreneur
- September 30
  - Javier Arau, composer, saxophonist, conductor, theorist, author, and entrepreneur
  - Jay Asher, writer and novelist
  - Ta-Nehisi Coates, author and journalist
  - Christopher Jackson, actor, musician, and composer

=== October ===
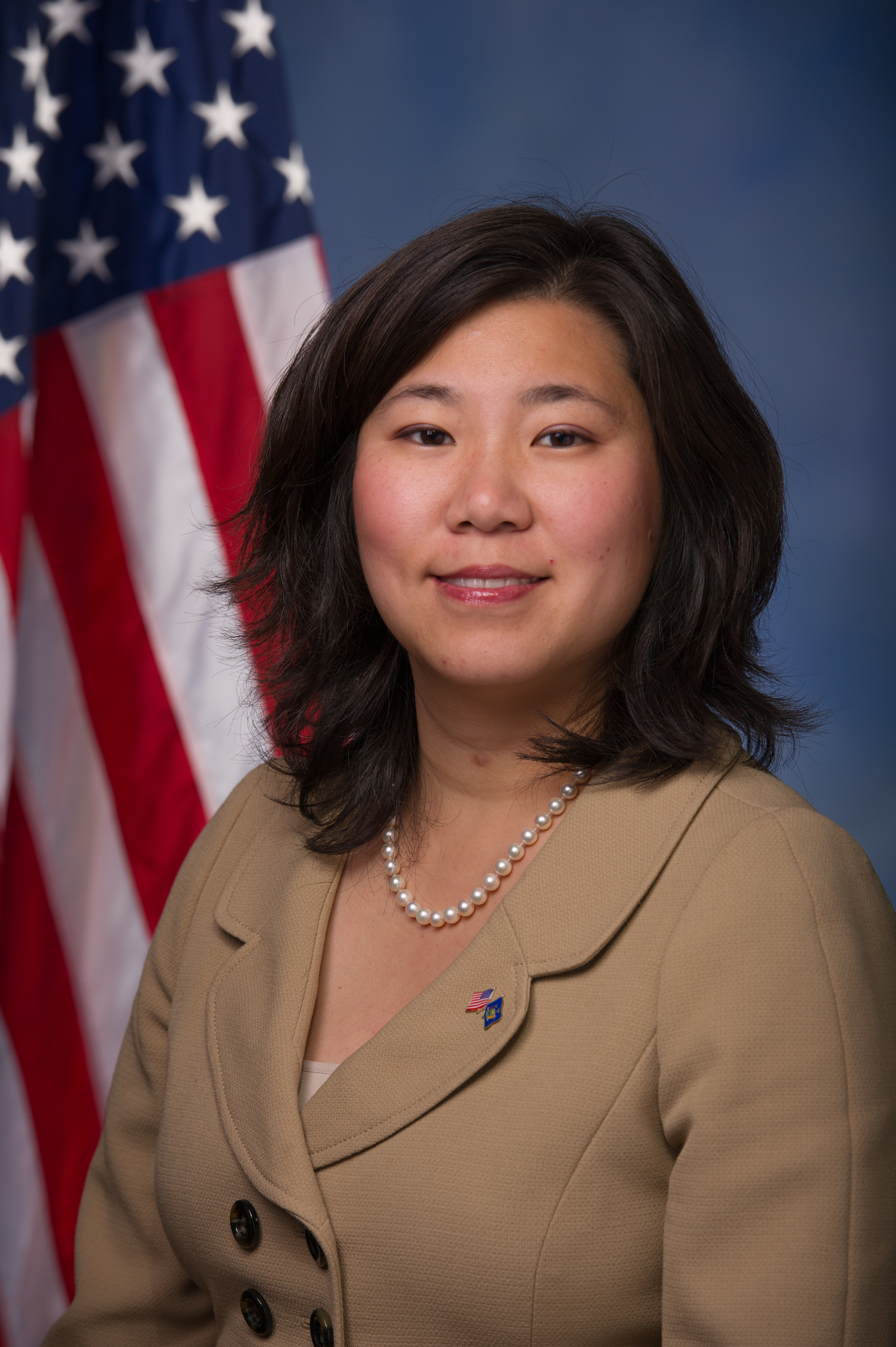
Grace Meng

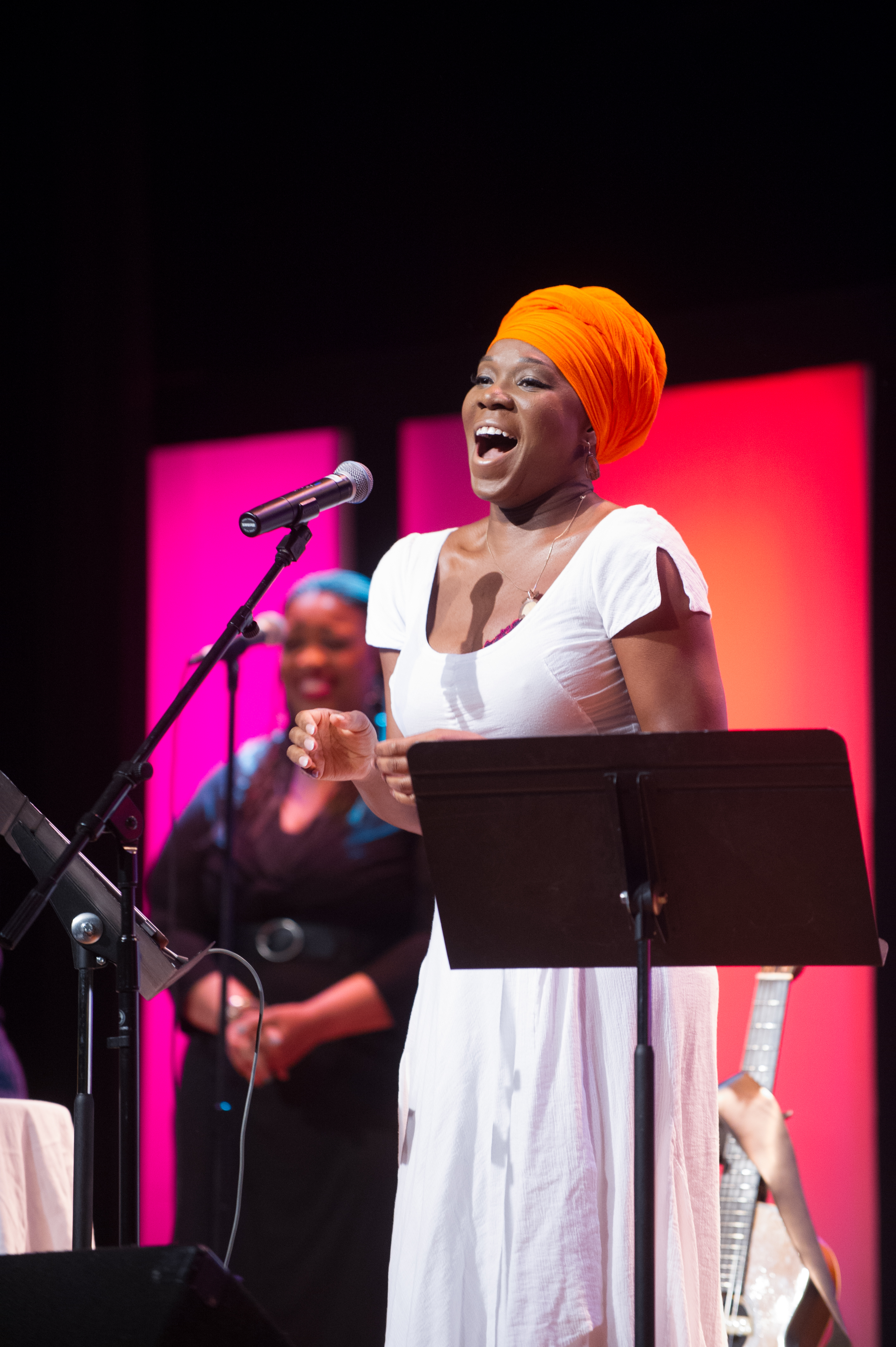
India Arie

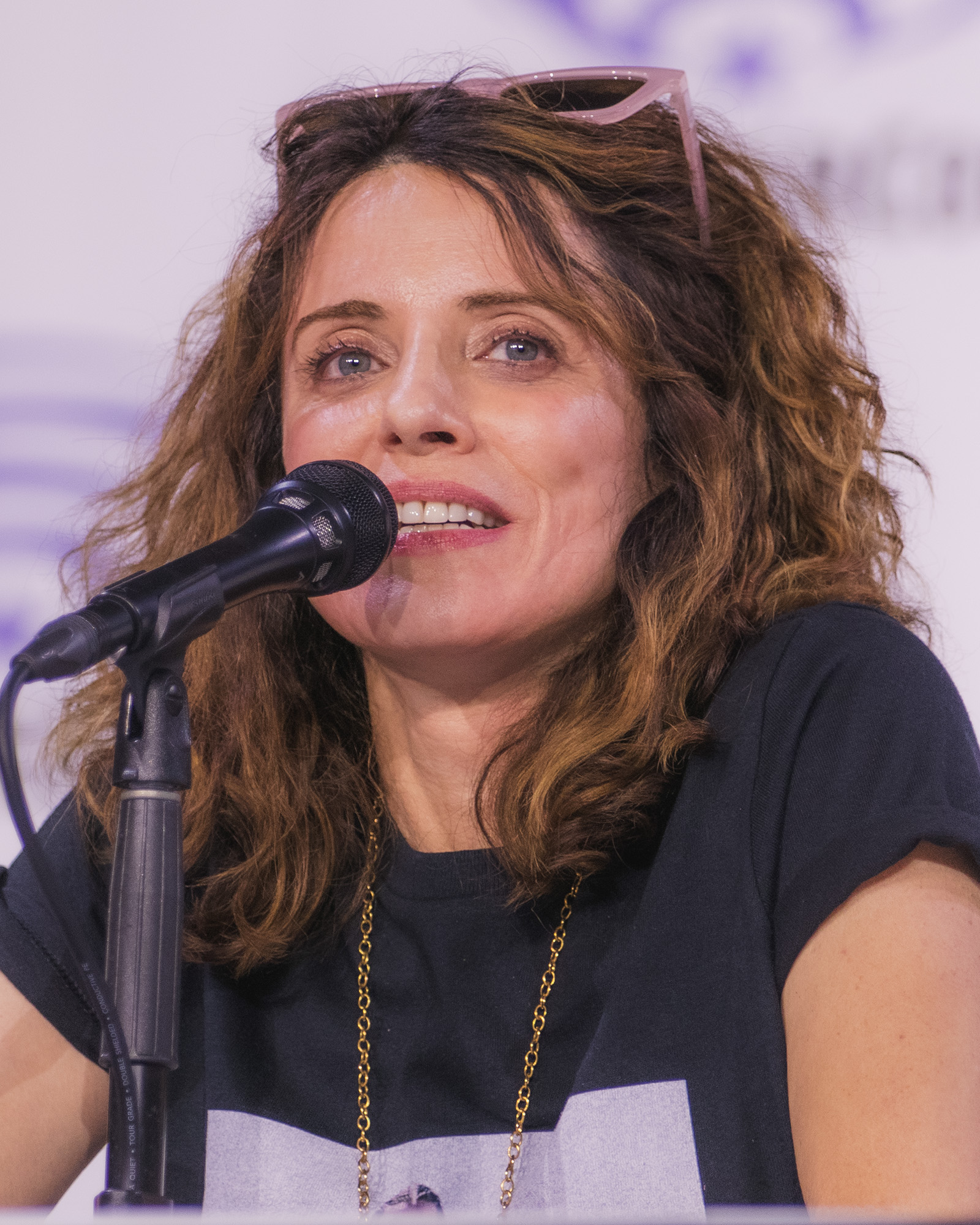
Alanna Ubach

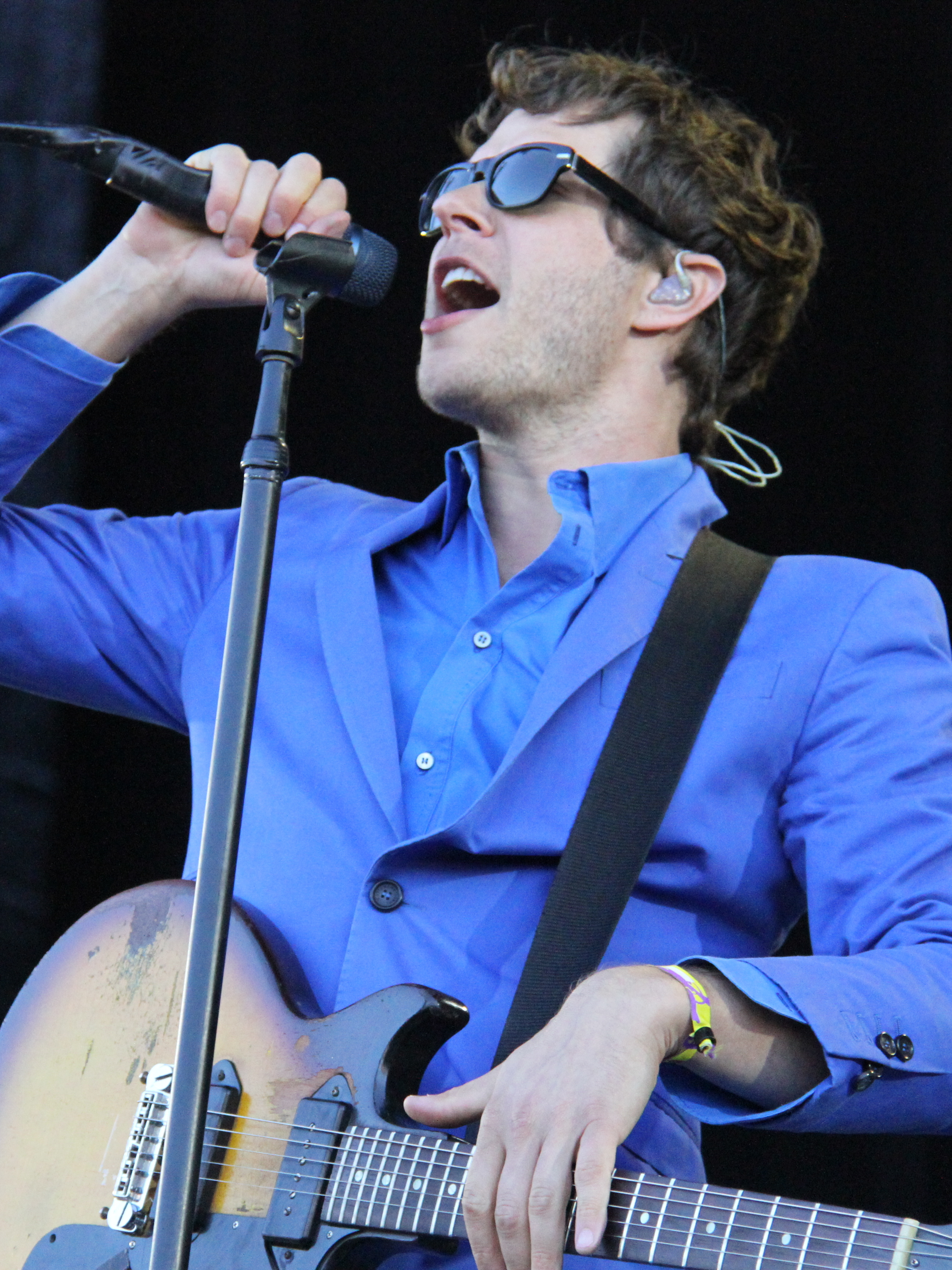
Damian Kulash

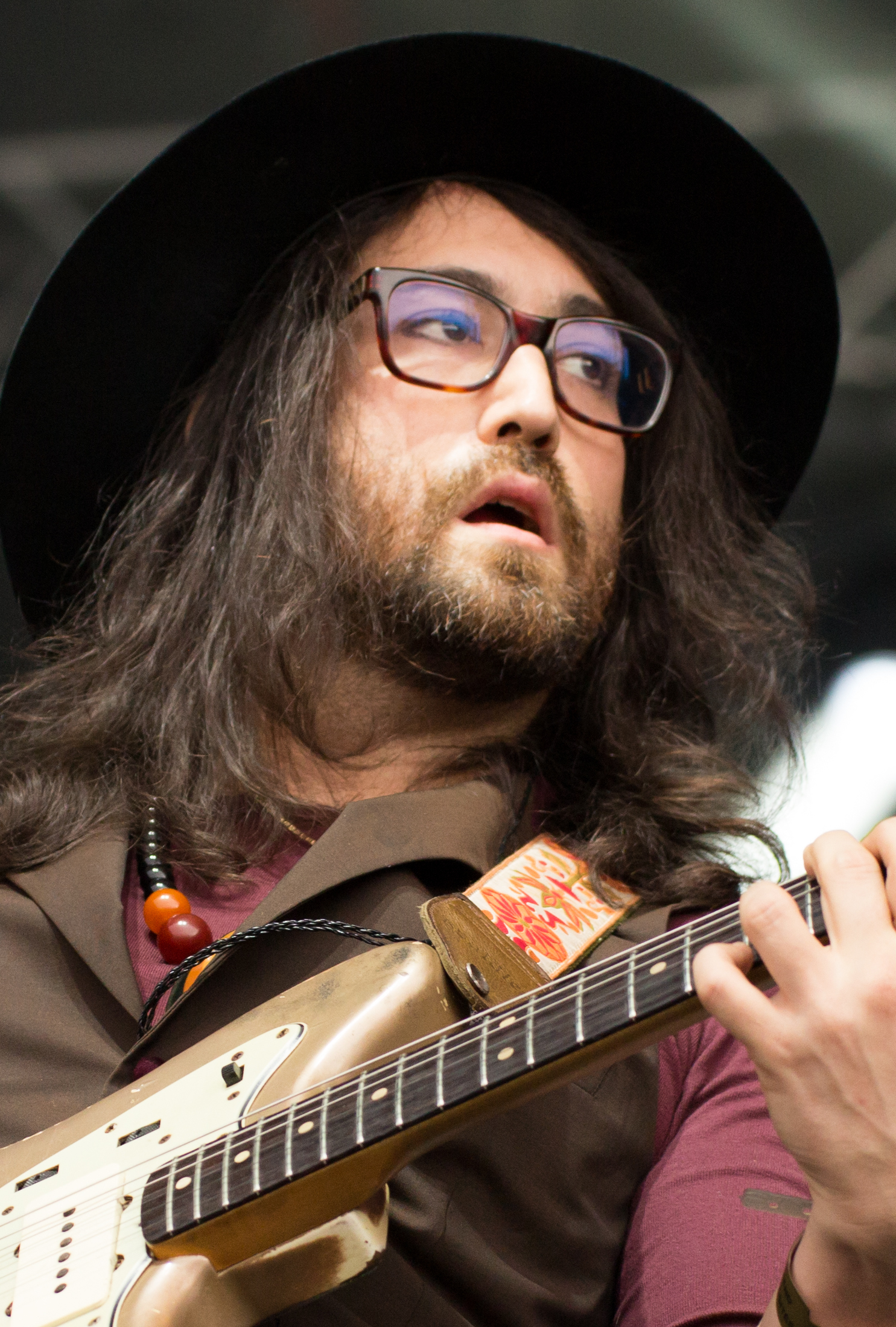
Sean Lennon

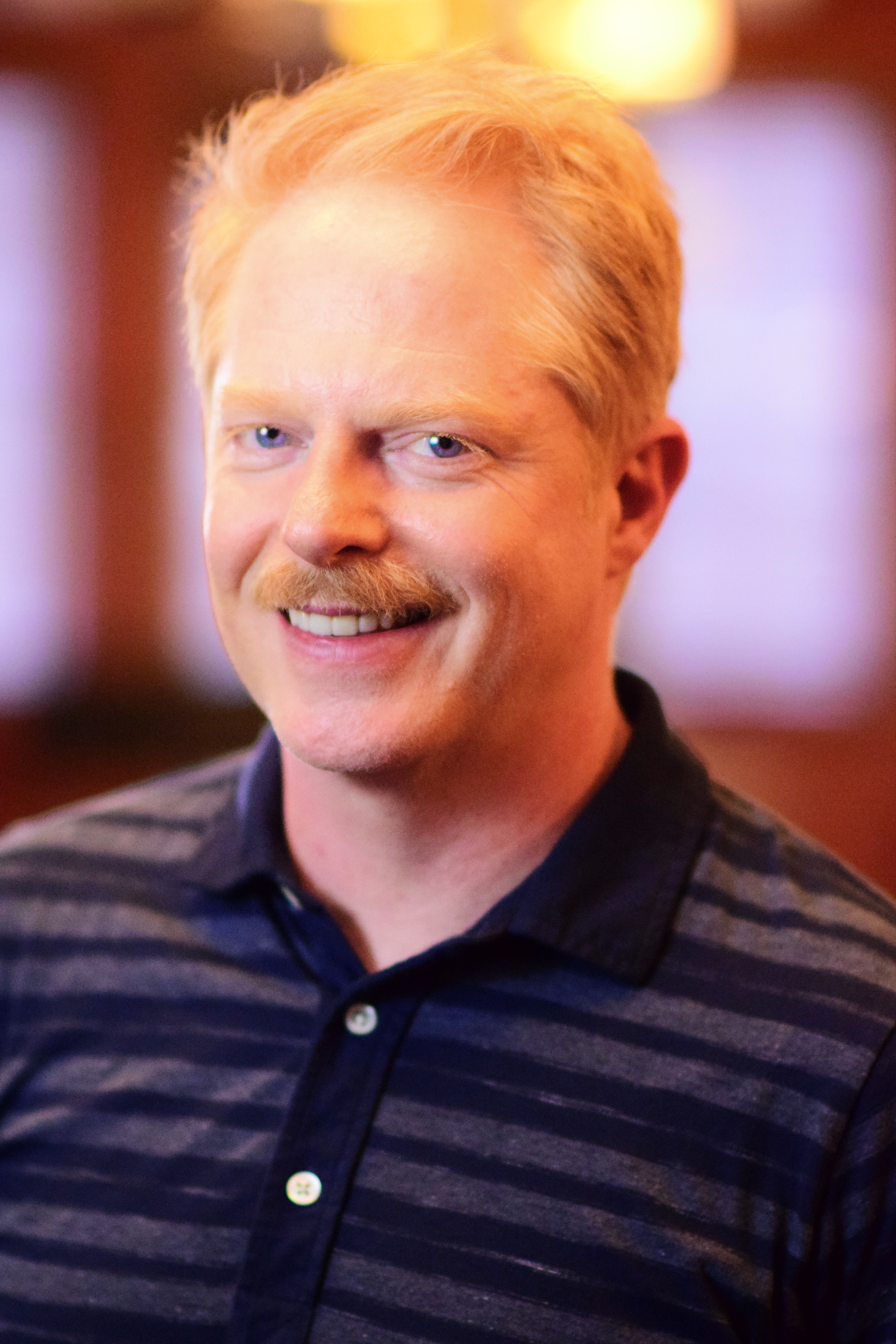
Jesse Tyler Ferguson

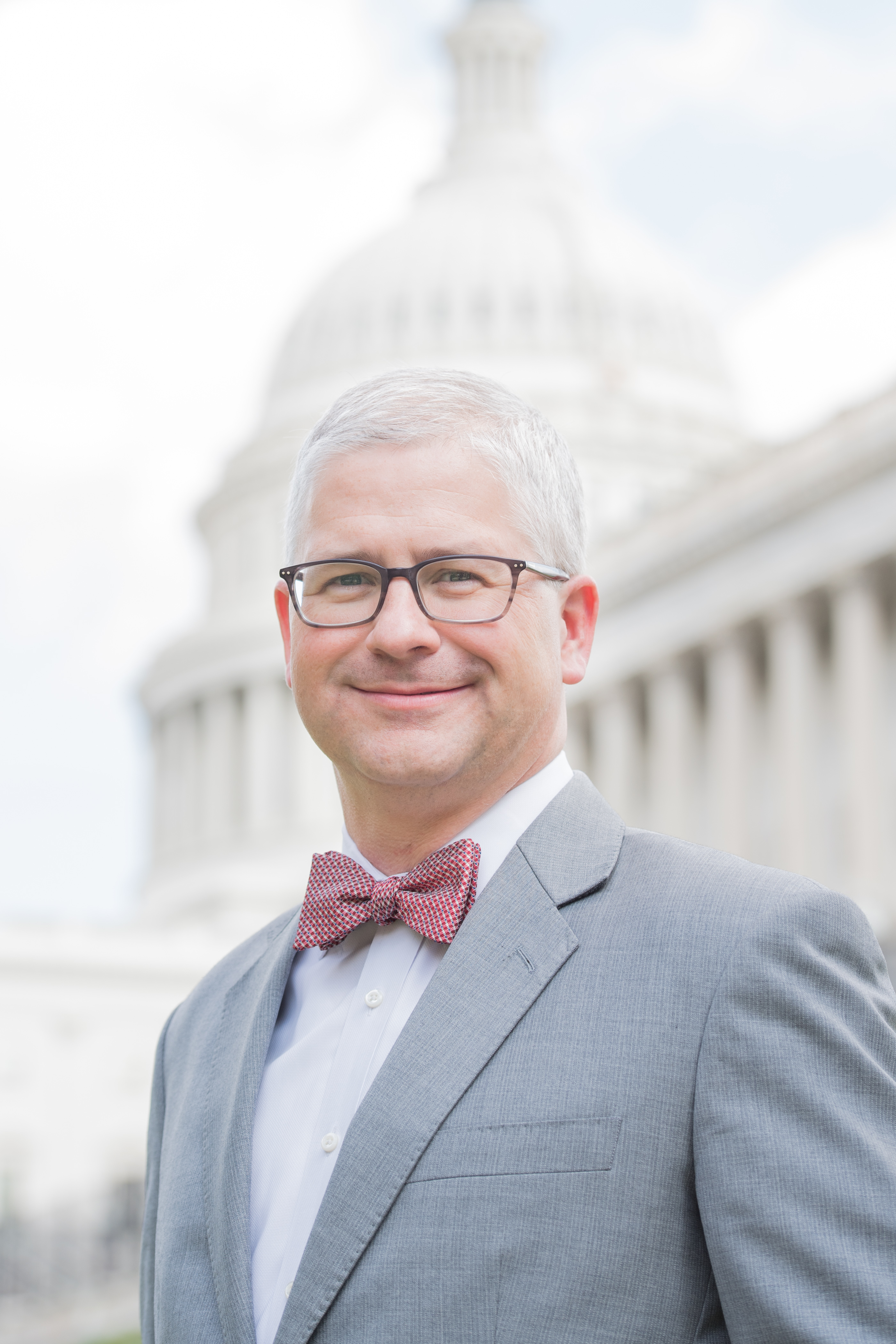
Patrick McHenry

- October 1 – Grace Meng, politician
- October 3
  - India Arie, singer/songwriter
  - Jake Braun, politician
  - Jon Buscemi, fashion designer
  - Talib Kweli, rapper
  - Alanna Ubach, actress and singer
- October 4
  - Ken Anderson, football player (d. 2009)
  - Reggie Lee, Philippine-born actor
- October 5
  - Erick Allen, politician
  - Nadine Burke Harris, Canadian-born pediatrician
  - Monica Rial, voice actress
  - Scott Weinger, actor, voice actor, writer and producer
- October 6 – Lisa Ann Coleman, child murderer
- October 7
  - Justin Brunette, baseball player
  - Jamie Hector, actor
  - Damian Kulash, singer and guitarist, frontman for OK Go
  - Rhyno, wrestler
- October 8
  - Jon Blackman, football player
  - Marc Molinaro, politician
- October 9
  - Sean Lennon, British-born musician, songwriter, producer, and multi-instrumentalist
  - Nate Newton, bassist and guitarist
- October 10
  - Richard Beaudoin, composer
  - Eric Johnson, politician, mayor of Dallas, Texas (2019–present)
  - Marc Menchaca, actor, writer, and director
- October 11
  - Klee Benally, singer, guitarist, and frontman for Blackfire
  - Nat Faxon, actor and comedian
  - Louis Ozawa Changchien, actor
- October 12 – Ahmad, rapper, songwriter, motivational speaker, and author
- October 14
  - Jason Boyce, soccer player
  - Floyd Landis, cyclist
- October 15
  - Chris Baldwin, cyclist
  - Joy Bisco, actress
  - Joe Golding, basketball player and coach.
- October 16 – Alexandra Barreto, actress
- October 17
  - Ibiyinka Alao, Nigerian-born artist, architect, writer, director, and composer
  - Francis Bouillon, American-born Canadian ice hockey player
- October 18 – Brandon Wolff, mixed martial artist and Navy SEAL
- October 19
  - Benjamin Heckendorn, electronics modifier and independent filmmaker
  - James L. Venable, composer
- October 20 – Natalie Gregory, actress
- October 21 – Frank Burns, politician
- October 22
  - Tom Basile, politician
  - Jesse Tyler Ferguson, actor
  - Patrick McHenry, politician
  - Mike Riley, cartoonist
- October 23
  - Keith Van Horn, basketball player
  - Michelle Beadle, sports reporter and host
  - Todd Belitz, baseball player
  - Boti Bliss, actress
- October 24
  - Amy Bailey, actress
  - Melissa Hutchison, voice actress
- October 26
  - Ryan Bradley, baseball player
  - Paula Faris, journalist
- October 27 – Aron Ralston, outdoorsman, mechanical engineer, and motivational speaker
- October 29
  - Taberon Honie, murderer and rapist (d. 2024)
  - Joy Osmanski, South Korean-born actress
  - Michael Schur, producer, writer, director, and actor
- October 30 – Keith Brooking, football player

=== November ===
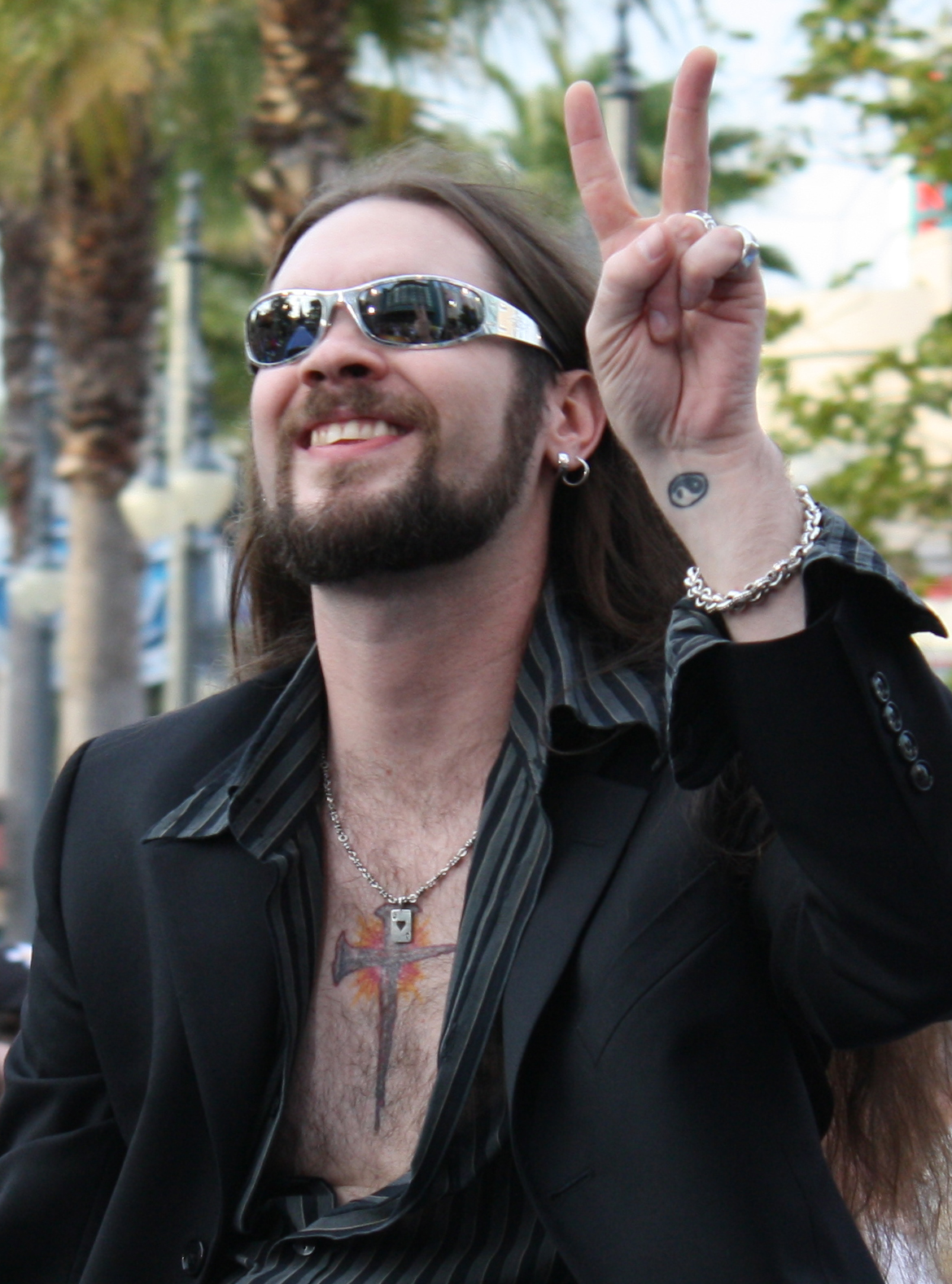
Bo Bice

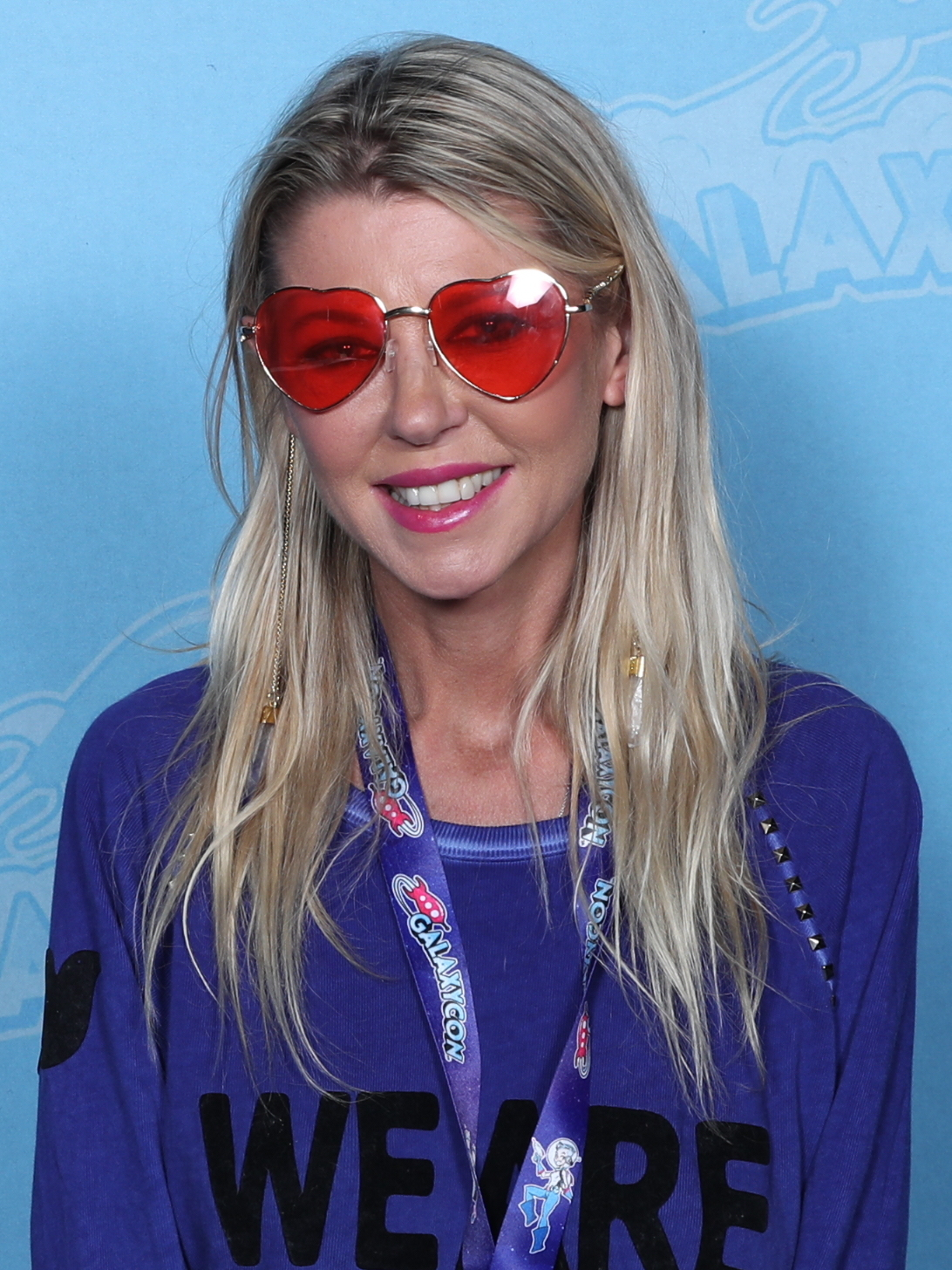
Tara Reid

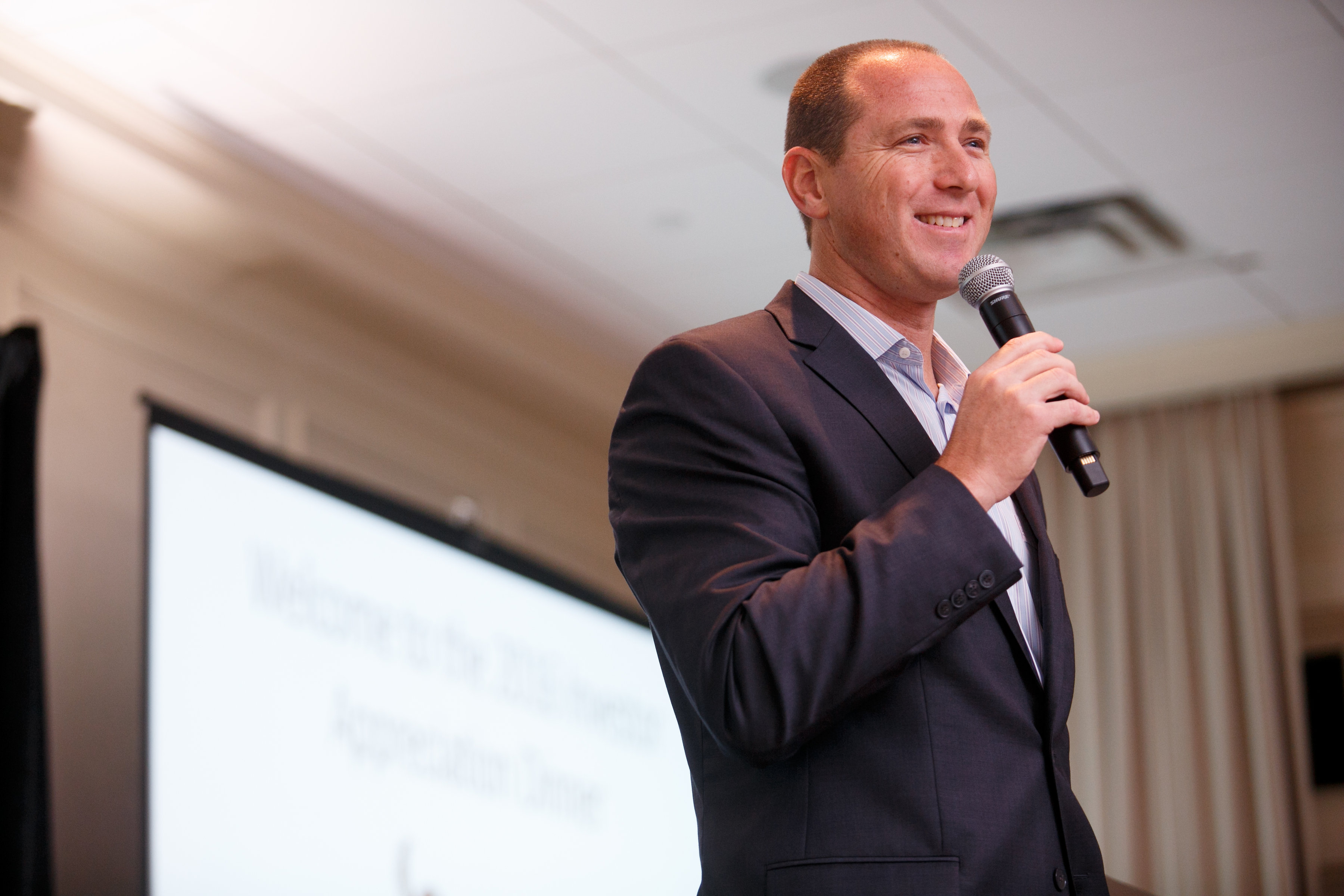
Jason Lezak

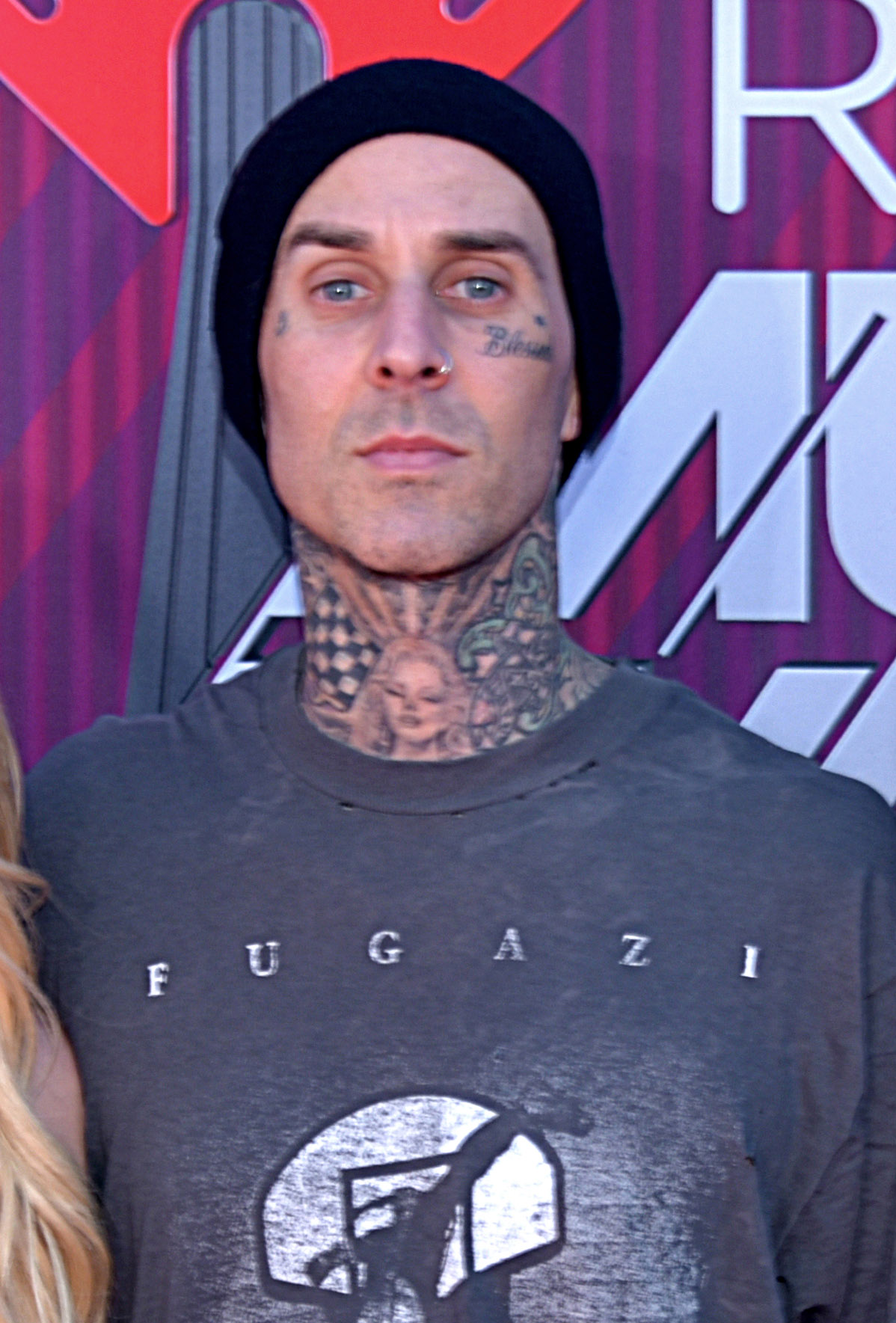
Travis Barker

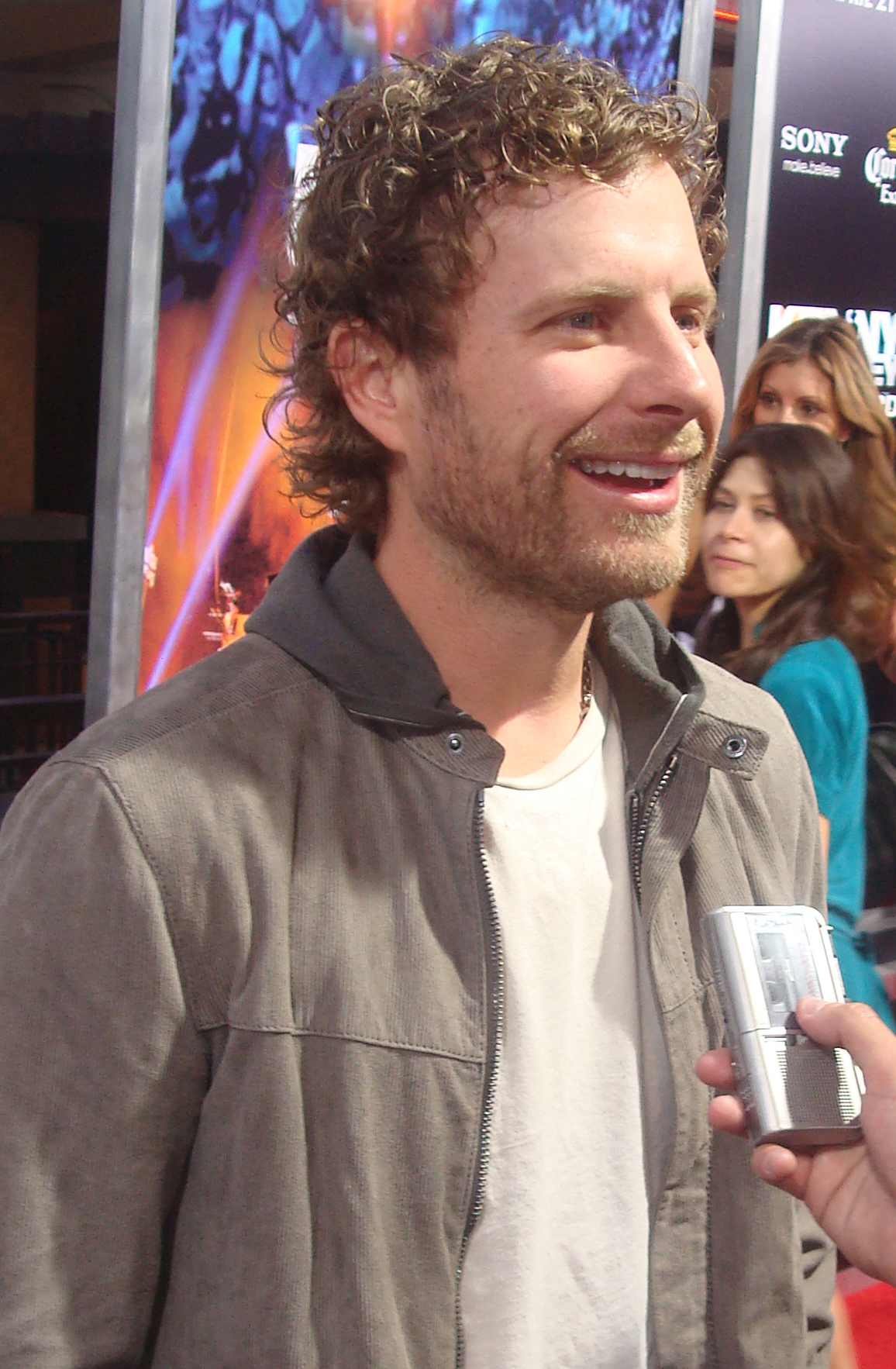
Dierks Bentley

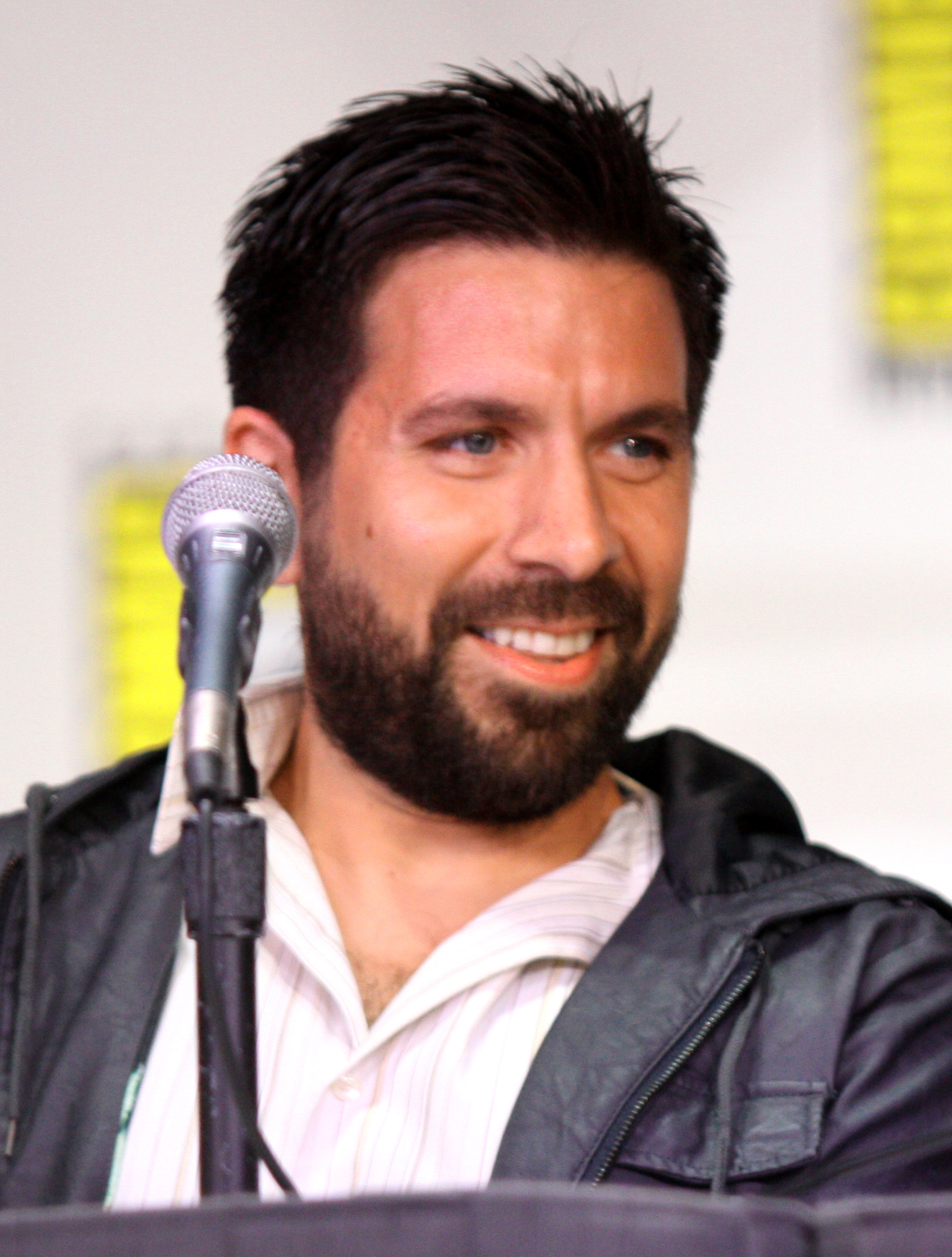
Joshua Gomez

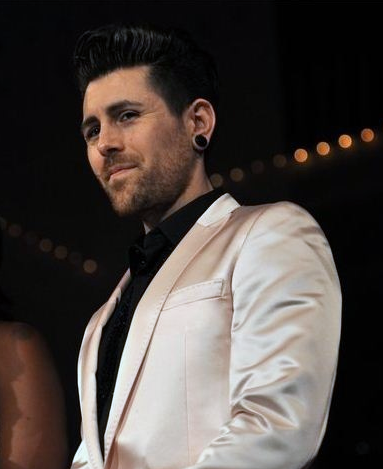
Davey Havok

- November 1 – Bo Bice, singer and American Idol contestant
- November 2
  - Camille Bloom, singer/songwriter
  - Vis Brown, actor
  - Danny Cooksey, actor and comedian
  - David Sirota, journalist
- November 3
  - Demetrius Alexander, basketball player
  - Toryn Green, singer and frontman for Fuel (2008–2011) and Emphatic (2012–2014)
- November 4 – Lorenzen Wright, basketball player (d. 2010)
- November 5
  - Jamie Madrox, rapper
  - Keala Settle, actress and singer
- November 7
  - Stephen Alexander, football player
  - Marcus Luttrell, U.S. Navy SEAL
  - Morgan Luttrell, U.S. Navy SEAL and politician
- November 8
  - Brevin Knight, basketball player
  - Steve J. Palmer, actor and producer
  - Tara Reid, actress
- November 9 – Sean Bennett, American-born Canadian football player
- November 10
  - Jim Adkins, singer, guitarist, and frontman for Jimmy Eat World
  - Derrick Baskin, actor
  - David Bellavia, United States Army staff sergeant and Medal of Honor recipient
  - Todd Bratrud, skateboard artist and designer
- November 11 – Angélica Vale, Mexican-born actress, singer, and comedian
- November 12
  - Brian Ah Yat, football player
  - Des Bishop, British-born American-Irish comedian
  - Guy Branum, comedian, writer, and actor
  - Jason Lezak, Olympic swimmer
- November 14
  - Jason Bare, Christian singer/songwriter
  - Travis Barker, musician and drummer for blink-182, +44, and Box Car Racer
  - Stephen Guarino, actor
  - Gary Vaynerchuk, Belarusian-born entrepreneur and internet personality
- November 15 – J. C. Brandy, British-born actress
- November 17
  - Abstract Rude, rapper
  - Leon Dorsey, convicted murderer (d. 2008)
- November 18
  - Neal E. Boyd, singer and reality show winner for America's Got Talent (d. 2018)
  - David Ortiz, Dominican-born baseball player
- November 19
  - Matthew Akers, director, producer, cinematographer, and photographer
  - Toby Bailey, basketball player and sports agent
  - Mike Burgess, politician
- November 20
  - Julien Aklei, singer/songwriter, guitarist, and artist
  - Dierks Bentley, country singer
  - Francis Bouillon, basketball player
  - Joshua Gomez, actor
  - Davey Havok, alternative rock singer and frontman for AFI
  - Ptolemy Slocum, actor
- November 21
  - Cherie Johnson, actress
  - Chris Moneymaker, poker player
- November 22
  - Daniel R. Benson, politician
  - James Madio, actor
- November 23 – Wiley Nickel, politician
- November 24 – Thomas Kohnstamm, writer
- November 26
  - Frankie Archuleta, boxer
  - Christopher Bollen, novelist and magazine writer
  - DJ Khaled, DJ, record executive, songwriter, record producer, and media personality
- November 27
  - Bad Azz, rapper (d. 2019)
  - Corporal Robinson, wrestler
- November 28
  - Jonathan Brown, American-born Canadian football player
  - Sunny Mabrey, actress
- November 30
  - Mark Blount, basketball player
  - Mindy McCready, country singer (d. 2013)
  - IronE Singleton, actor

=== December ===
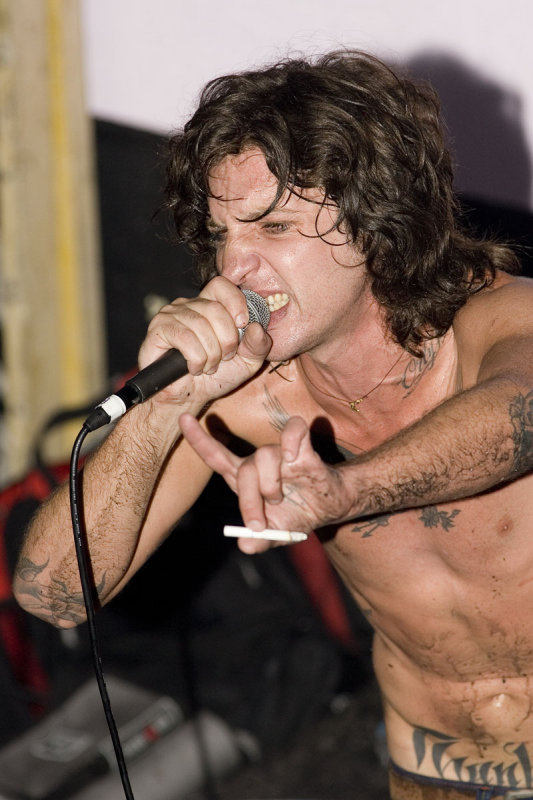
Mickey Avalon

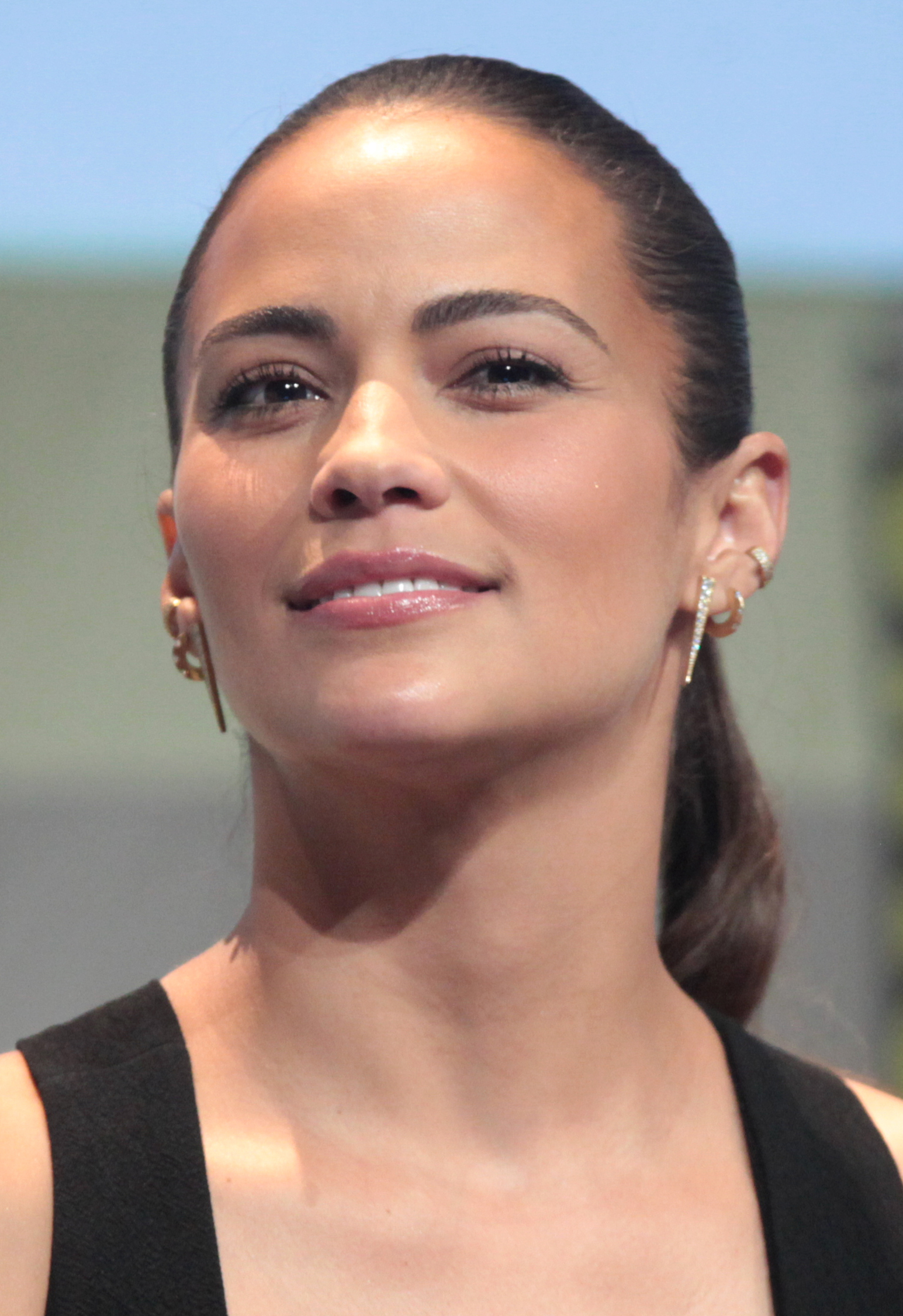
Paula Patton

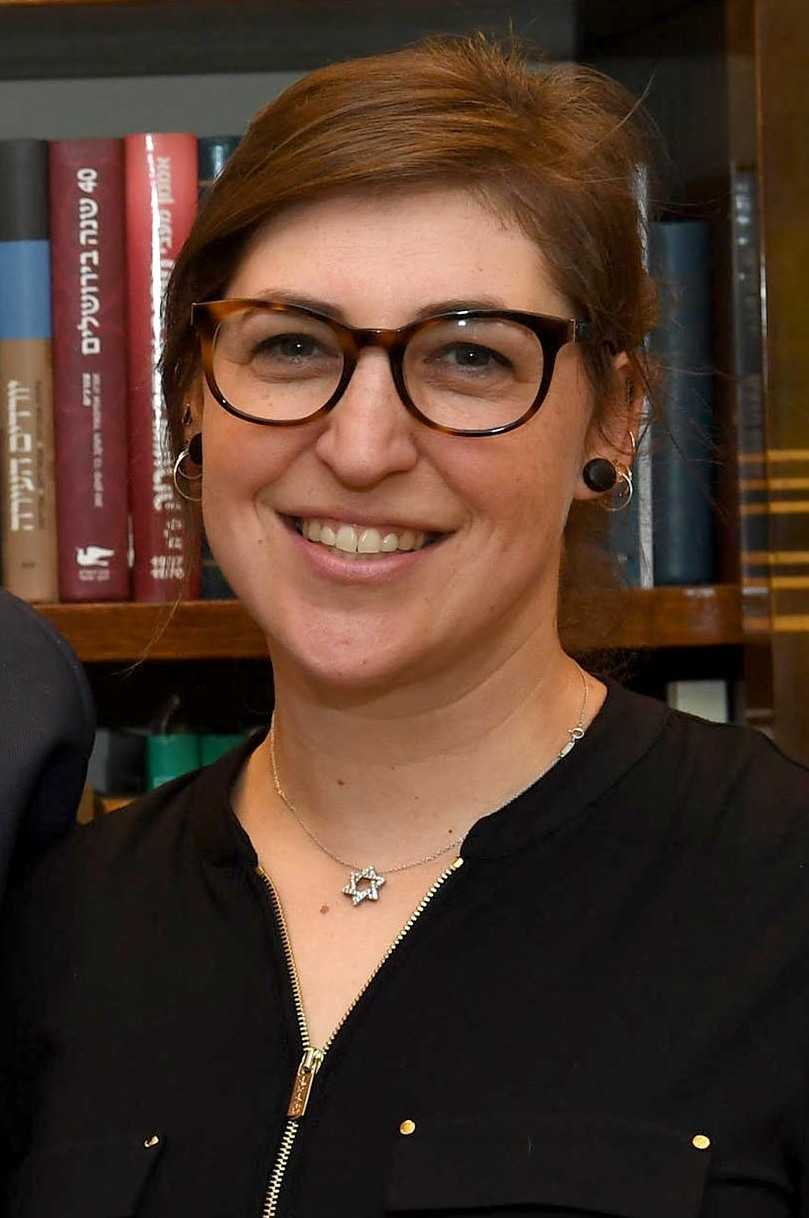
Mayim Bialik

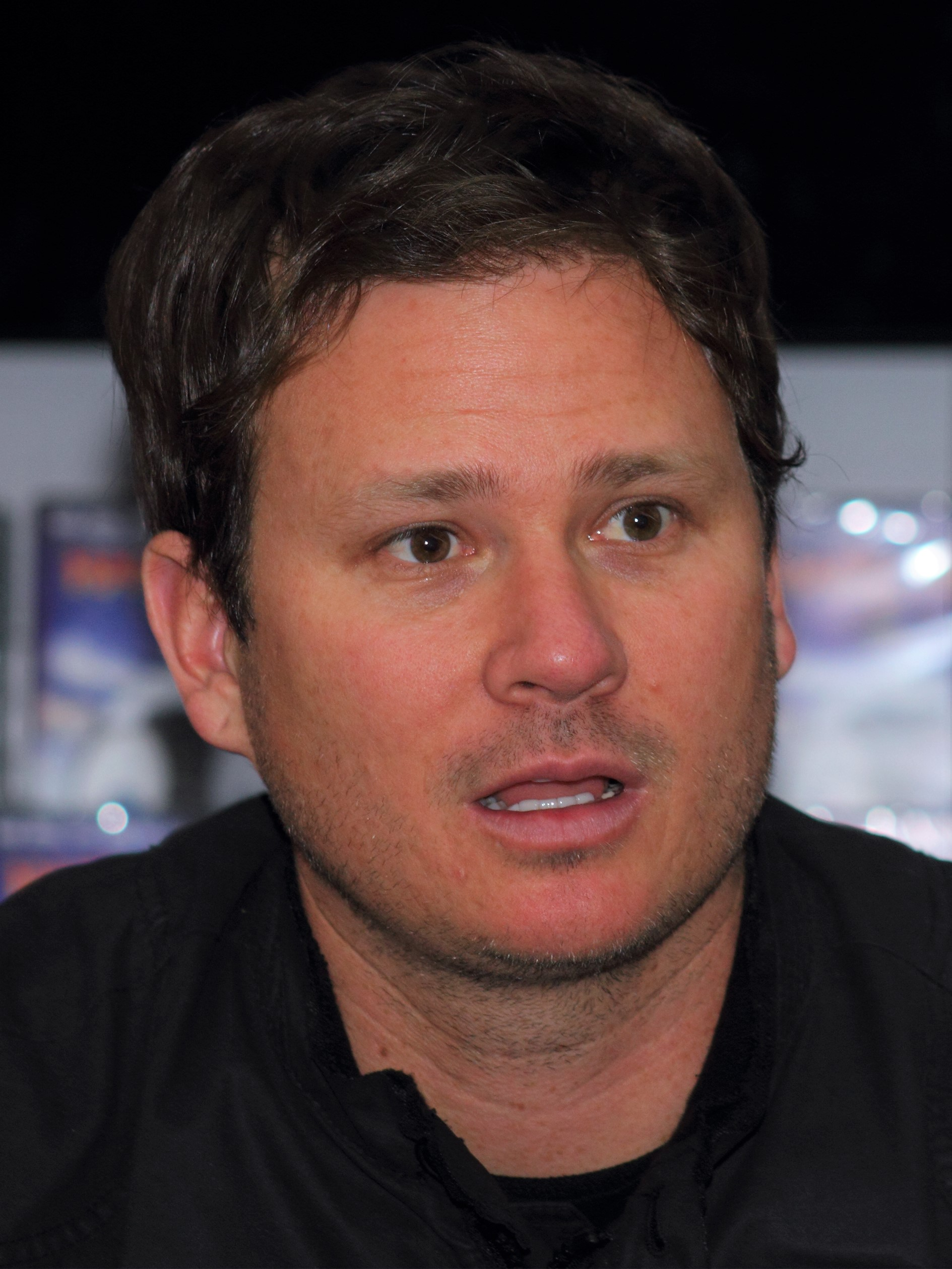
Tom DeLonge

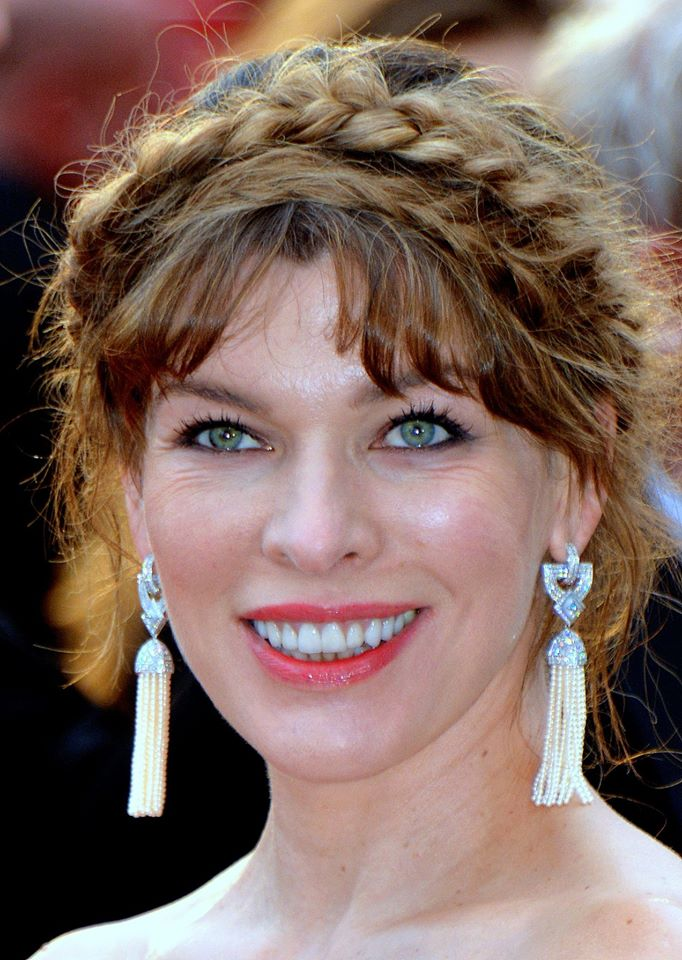
Milla Jovovich

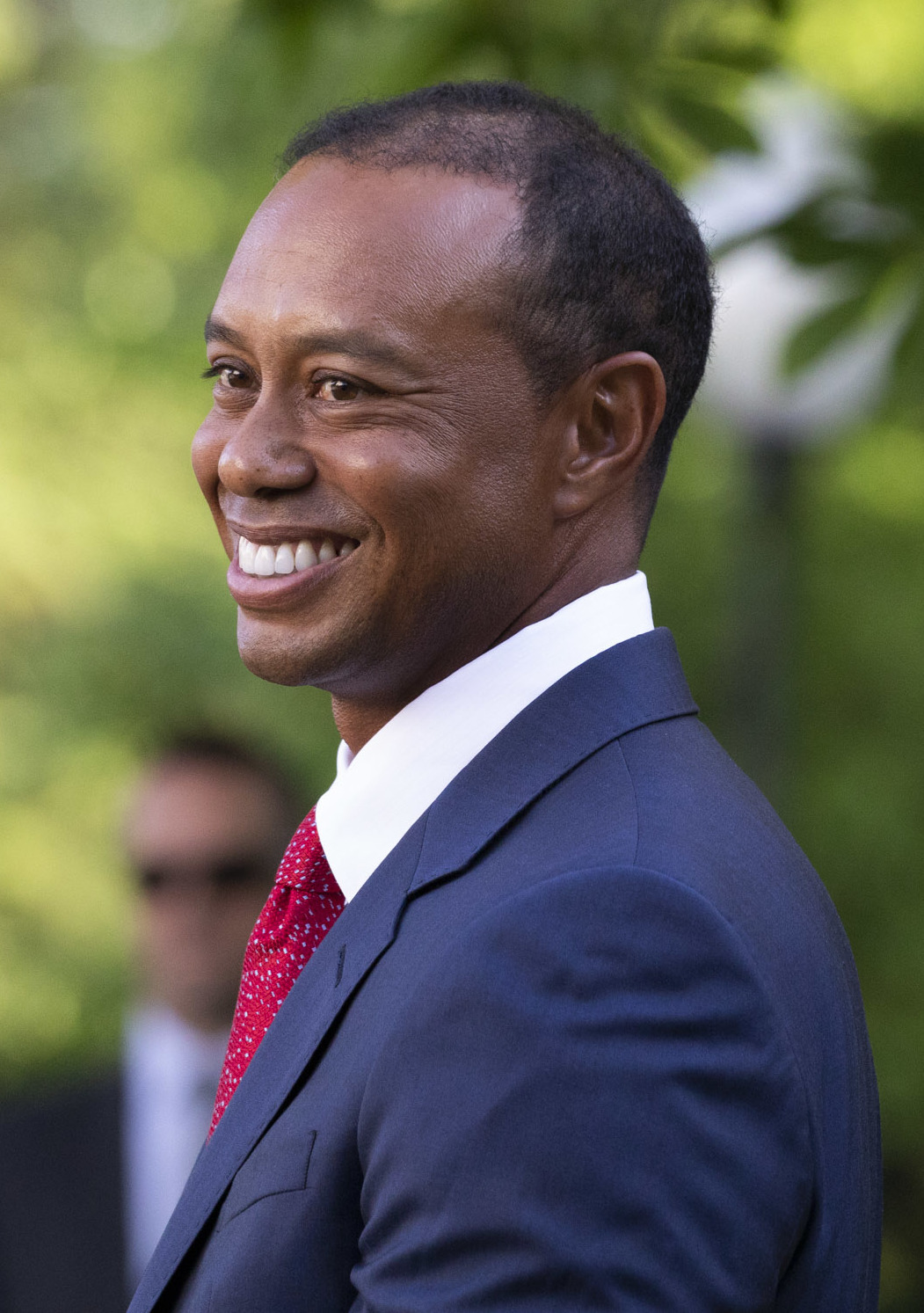
Tiger Woods

- December 1 – David Hornsby, actor, screenwriter, and producer
- December 3 – Mickey Avalon, rapper
- December 4 – D'Wayne Bates, football player
- December 5
  - Paula Patton, actress
  - Nick Stahl, actor and producer
- December 6 – Mia Love, politician (d. 2025)
- December 7
  - Raj Bhakta, entrepreneur, spirits industry executive, and real estate investor
  - Pat Bianchi, jazz organist
  - Seth Meisterman, artist
- December 8
  - Brian Barkley, baseball player
  - Corey Bradford, football player
  - Kevin Harvick, race car driver
- December 9 – Travis Atkins, U.S. Army soldier and Medal of Honor recipient (d. 2007)
- December 10
  - Steve Bradley, wrestler (d. 2008)
  - Emmanuelle Chriqui, Canadian-born actress
  - Joe Mays, baseball pitcher
- December 12
  - Mayim Bialik, actress and neuroscientist
  - Bobbi Billard, wrestler, actress, model, and author
- December 13
  - Andy Bachetti, race car driver
  - Brian Baenig, government official
  - Bates Battaglia, ice hockey player
  - Michael Baumgartner, politician
  - C. J. Bruton, American-born Australian basketball player
  - Tom DeLonge, musician, author, UFOlogist, guitarist and singer for blink-182, Box Car Racer, and Angels & Airwaves
- December 14
  - Justin Furstenfeld, actor, singer, guitarist, and frontman for Blue October
  - KaDee Strickland, actress
- December 17
  - Nick Dinsmore, wrestler
  - Milla Jovovich, Ukrainian-born actress and model
  - Steve Zissis, actor
- December 18
  - Caesar Bacarella, stock car racing driver
  - Jay Bakker, pastor, author, and speaker
  - Randy Houser, country music singer
- December 19
  - Russell Branyan, baseball player
  - Breez Evahflowin', rapper
- December 22 – Omar Dorsey, actor
- December 23
  - Brian Babylon, comedian and radio host
  - Ilan Berman, lawyer and educator
  - Cindy Blodgett, basketball player
- December 24
  - Stephanie Ruhle, journalist and news anchor
  - Daniel Mustard, singer/songwriter
- December 26 – Deena Aljuhani Abdulaziz, business woman and editor
- December 27 – Heather O'Rourke, actress (d. 1988)
- December 28
  - Daniel Beaty, actor, singer, writer, composer, and poet
  - Mark Boidman, Canadian-born investment banker and attorney
- December 29 – Shawn Hatosy, actor
- December 30 – Tiger Woods, golfer

=== Full date unknown ===
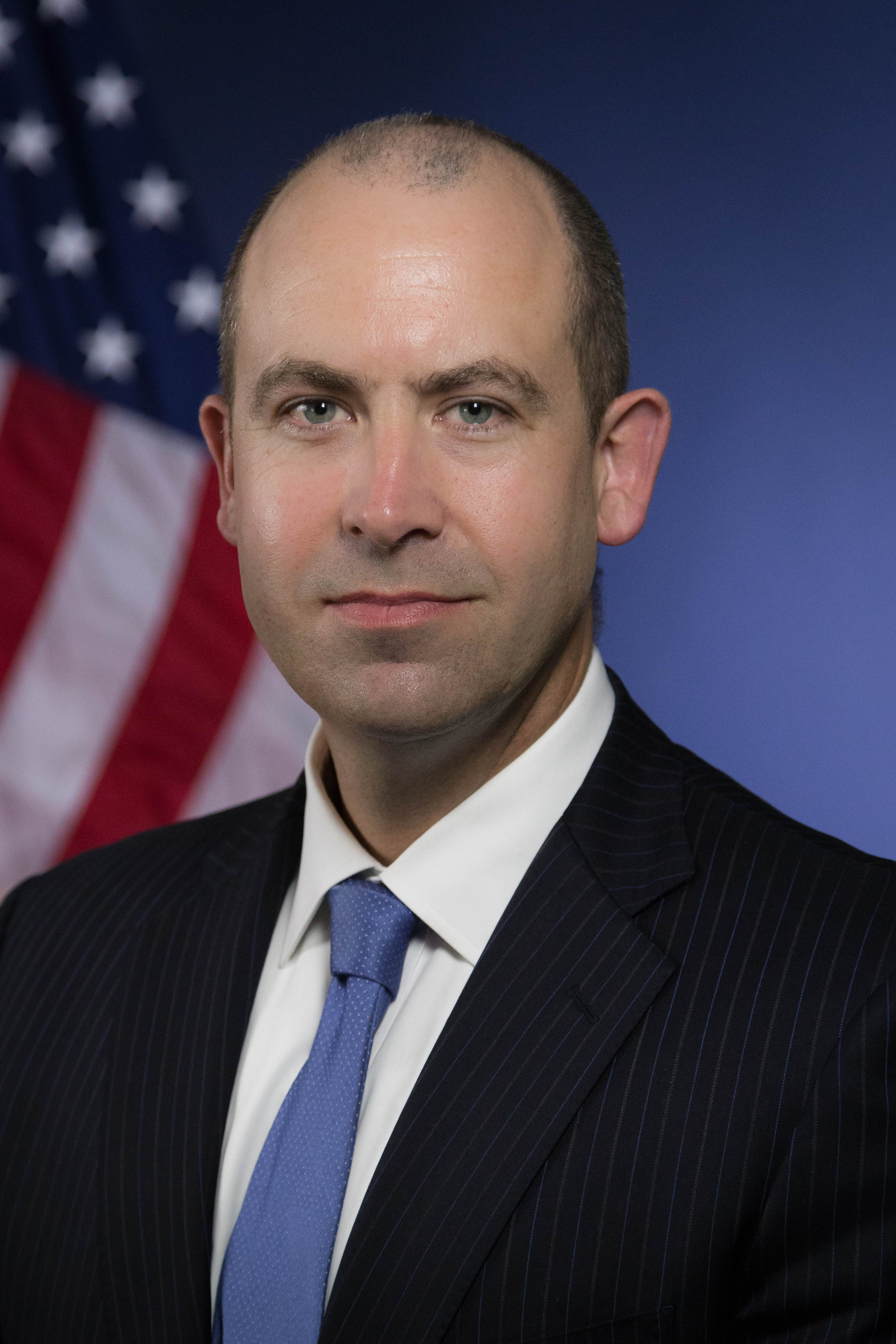
John C. Anderson

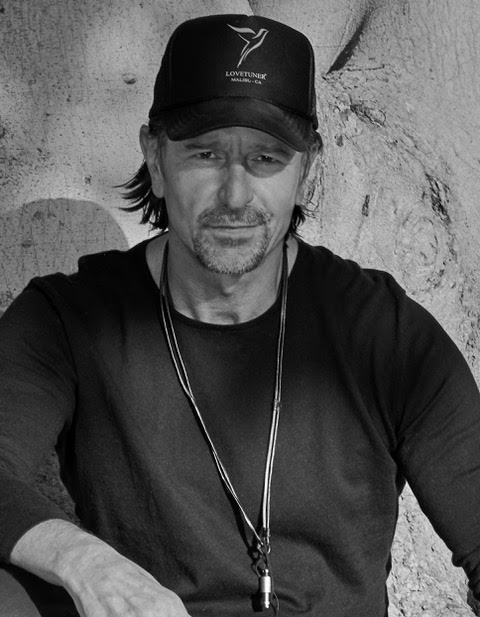
Sigmar Berg

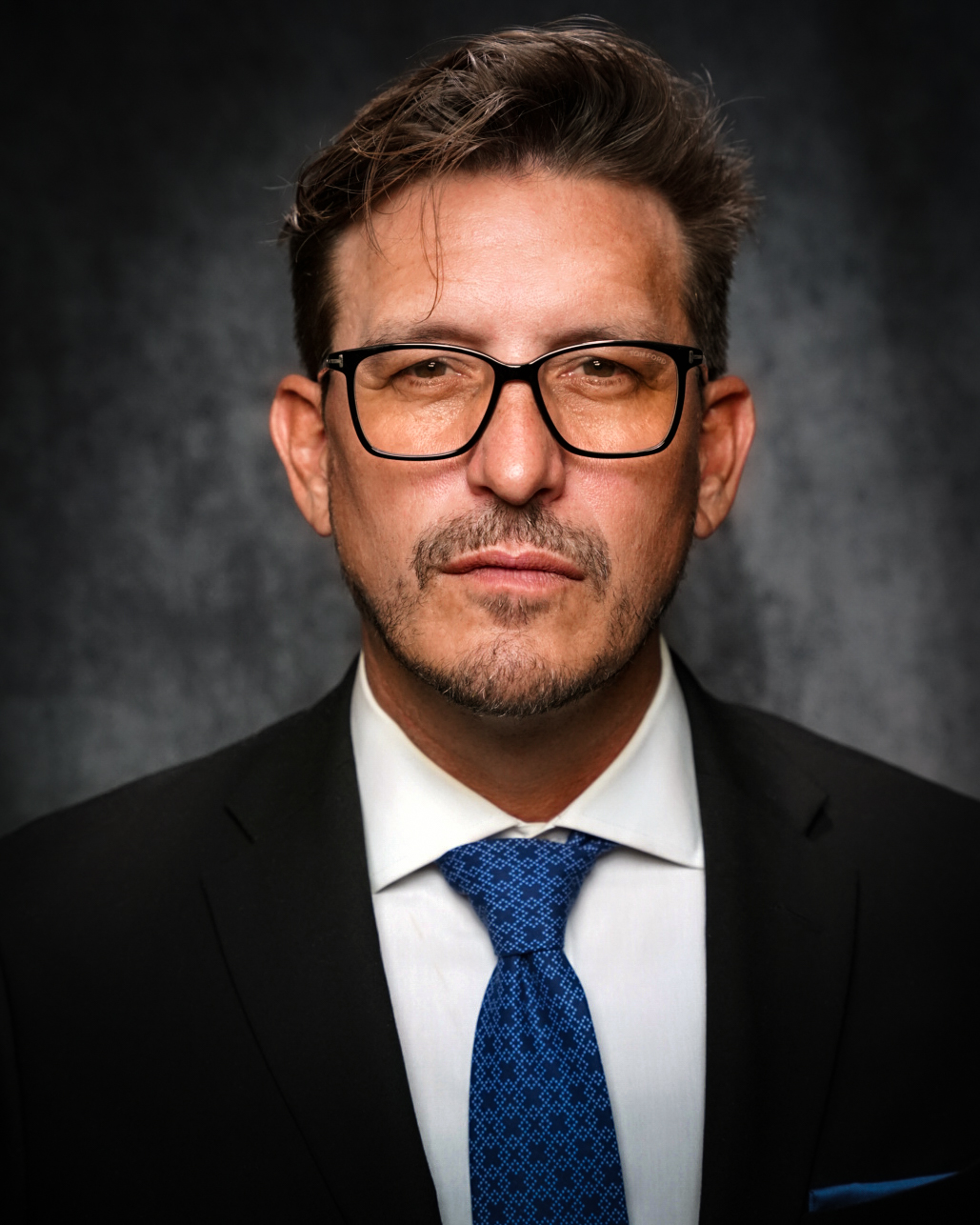
Christian Bowman

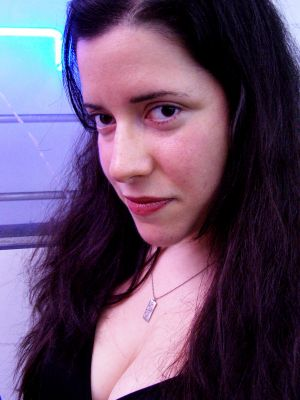
Rachel Kramer Bussel

- David Adams, video game designer
- Pearl Aday, singer
- Deborah Adler, designer
- Shiva Ahmadi, Iranian-born artist
- Cardenas J. Alban, United States Army staff sergeant and convicted murderer
- Ahmed Alsoudani, Iraqi-born artist
- Casey Anderson, filmmaker, wildlife naturalist, and television presenter
- John C. Anderson, lawyer and Attorney for the United States District Court for the District of New Mexico
- Bryan Andrews, filmmaker
- Josephine Angelini, author
- Scott D. Anthony, author and senior partner for Innosight
- Sam Apple, writer
- Vicente Archer, jazz musician
- Shea Backus, politician
- Gaiutra Bahadur, Guyanese-born writer
- Kristin Baker, painter
- Dean Bakopoulos, writer
- Mandi Ballinger, politician
- Scott Banister, entrepreneur, angel investor, and founder of IronPort
- Rachel Barenblat, poet, rabbi, chaplain, and blogger
- Ty Barnett, actor and stand-up comic
- Kevin Baron, journalist
- Holly Bass, artist, poet, dancer, educator, and activist
- Mohamad Bazzi, Lebanese-born journalist
- Glenn Belverio, journalist
- Joshua Benton, journalist and writer
- Sigmar Berg, Austrian-born entrepreneur, artist, photographer, and fashion designer
- Cassie Berman, musician
- Joanna Bernabei-McNamee, basketball player and coach
- Katherine Bernhardt, artist
- Sherwin Bitsui, writer and poet
- Shanir Ezra Blumenkranz, bassist and oud player
- Benjamin Bolger, perpetual student and University professor
- Shawnna Bolick, politician
- Ruschell Boone, Jamaican-born newscaster (d. 2023)
- Christian Bowman, actor, director, producer, and screenwriter
- Anu Bradford, Finnish-born author, law professor, and international trade law expert
- Joe Bradley, artist and singer
- Slater Bradley, artist
- Catherine P. Bradshaw, psychologist
- Tarren Bragdon, politician
- Adam L. Braverman, attorney
- Brian Bress, artist
- David Brooks, artist
- Jeffrey Brown, cartoonist
- Lars Brownworth, podcaster and educator
- Catherine Brunell, actress
- Thi Bui, Vietnam-born novelist and illustrator
- Abraham Burickson, poet and artist
- A.K. Burns, artist
- Casey Burns, illustrator, screen printer, rock poster artist, musician, and advertising art director
- Rachel Kramer Bussel, author, columnist, and editor
- Mark Bussler, filmmaker, entrepreneur, and comic creator
- Taylor Ho Bynum, musician, composer, educator, and writer
- Jason Farnham, composer, performer, and record producer
- Brian 'Brizz' Gillis, singer and member of LFO (d. 2010)
- Teresa Alonso Leon, politician
- John Sandweg, attorney and Director of the U.S. Immigration and Customs Enforcement (2013–2014)

== Deaths ==
- January 4 – Bob Montana, comic strip artist (b. 1920)
- January 7 – Harry Gunnison Brown, economist (b. 1880)
- January 8 – Louis P. Lochner, political activist, journalist and author (b. 1887)
- January 18 – Evelyn Greeley, silent film actress (b. 1888)
- January 19 – Thomas Hart Benton, painter (b. 1889)
- January 24 – Larry Fine, comedian and actor (b. 1902)
- January 27
  - Julia Sanderson, actress (b. 1887)
  - Bill Walsh, film producer and writer (b. 1913)
- February 4 – Louis Jordan, African American swing band leader (b. 1908)
- February 5 – George Rowe, silent film character actor (b. 1894)
- February 10 – Dave Alexander, musician (b. 1947)
- February 14 – P. G. Wodehouse, comic writer (b. 1881 in the United Kingdom)
- February 16 – Morgan Taylor, Olympic hurdler (b. 1903)
- February 20 – Robert Strauss, actor (b. 1913)
- February 23 – Frank Smith, animator and film director (b. 1911)
- February 25 – Elijah Muhammad, Nation of Islam leader (b. 1897)
- February 27 – Muriel Hazel Wright, Oklahoma author and historian (b. 1889)
- March 7 – Ben Blue, Canadian-American actor and comedian (b. 1901)
- March 8 – George Stevens, film director, producer, screenwriter, and cinematographer (b. 1904)
- March 14 – Susan Hayward, film actress (b. 1917)
- March 16 – T-Bone Walker, blues musician, composer, songwriter, and bandleader (b. 1910)
- March 19 – Harry Lachman, set designer and film director (b. 1886)
- March 21 – Joe Medwick, baseball player (b. 1911)
- March 30 – Pancho Barnes, pioneer aviator (b. 1901)
- April 7 – Maxwell Maltz, cosmetic surgeon, author of Psycho-Cybernetics (b. 1899)
- April 10 – Marjorie Main, actress (b. 1890)
- April 14 – Fredric March, actor (b. 1897)
- April 15 – Richard Conte, actor (b. 1910)
- April 16 – Joe Kirk, actor (b. 1903)
- April 19 – Percy Lavon Julian, African American research chemist (b. 1899)
- April 20 – John Vachon, photographer (b. 1914)
- May 4
  - Moe Howard, comedian and actor (b. 1897)
  - Two Ton Baker, entertainer (b. 1916)
- May 13
  - Richard Hollingshead, inventor of the drive-in theater (b. 1900)
  - Bob Wills, musician, songwriter, and bandleader (b. 1905)
- May 18 – Leroy Anderson, composer (b. 1908)
- May 22 – Lefty Grove, baseball player (b. 1900)
- May 23 – Moms Mabley, comedian and actress (b. 1897)
- May 28
  - Ezzard Charles, professional boxer (b. 1921)
  - Roy Roberts, actor (b. 1906)
- June 3 – Ozzie Nelson, actor, musician, and filmmaker (b. 1906)
- June 6
  - Larry Blyden, actor and game show host (b. 1925)
  - Ethel Weed, promoter of Japanese women's rights (b. 1906)
- June 15 – William Austin, film character actor (b. 1884 in the United Kingdom)
- June 28 – Rod Serling, writer, producer, narrator, and host (b. 1924)
- July 24 – Barbara Colby, actress (b. 1939)
- July 16 – Lester Dragstedt, surgeon (b 1893)
- August 8 – Cannonball Adderley, jazz alto saxophonist (b. 1928)
- August 23 – Hank Patterson, actor and musician (b. 1888)
- September 6 – Shelton Brooks, African American song composer (b. 1886 in Canada)
- September 9 – John McGiver, actor (b. 1913)
- September 28 – Sidney Fields, actor (b. 1898)
- September 29 – Casey Stengel, baseball player and manager (b. 1890)
- October 1
  - Al Jackson Jr., drummer, songwriter, and producer (b. 1935)
  - Larry MacPhail, lawyer and baseball executive (b. 1890)
- October 4 – May Sutton, tennis player (b. 1886)
- October 16 – Benjamin McCandlish, Governor of Guam (b. 1886)
- October 18 – Al Lettieri, actor (b. 1928)
- November 5
  - Julian C. Smith, general (b. 1885)
  - Lionel Trilling, literary critic (b. 1905)
- November 14 – Harry J. Anslinger, 1st Commissioner of the Federal Bureau of Narcotics (b. 1892)
- November 16 – Frederick Lawton, 9th Director of the Office of Management and Budget (b 1900)
- December 1 – Nellie Fox, baseball player (b. 1927)
- December 7 – Thornton Wilder, playwright and novelist (b. 1897)
- December 13 – Cyril Delevanti, English actor (b. 1889)
- December 14 – Arthur Treacher, English actor (b. 1894)
- December 17 – Hound Dog Taylor, guitarist and singer (b. 1915)
- December 24 – Bernard Herrmann, composer and husband of Lucille Fletcher (b. 1911)
- December 29 – Euell Gibbons, outdoorsman, writer, and health food advocate (b. 1911)

== See also ==
- List of American films of 1975
- Timeline of United States history (1970–1989)
