= C. J. Avery =

American gridiron football player (born 1999)

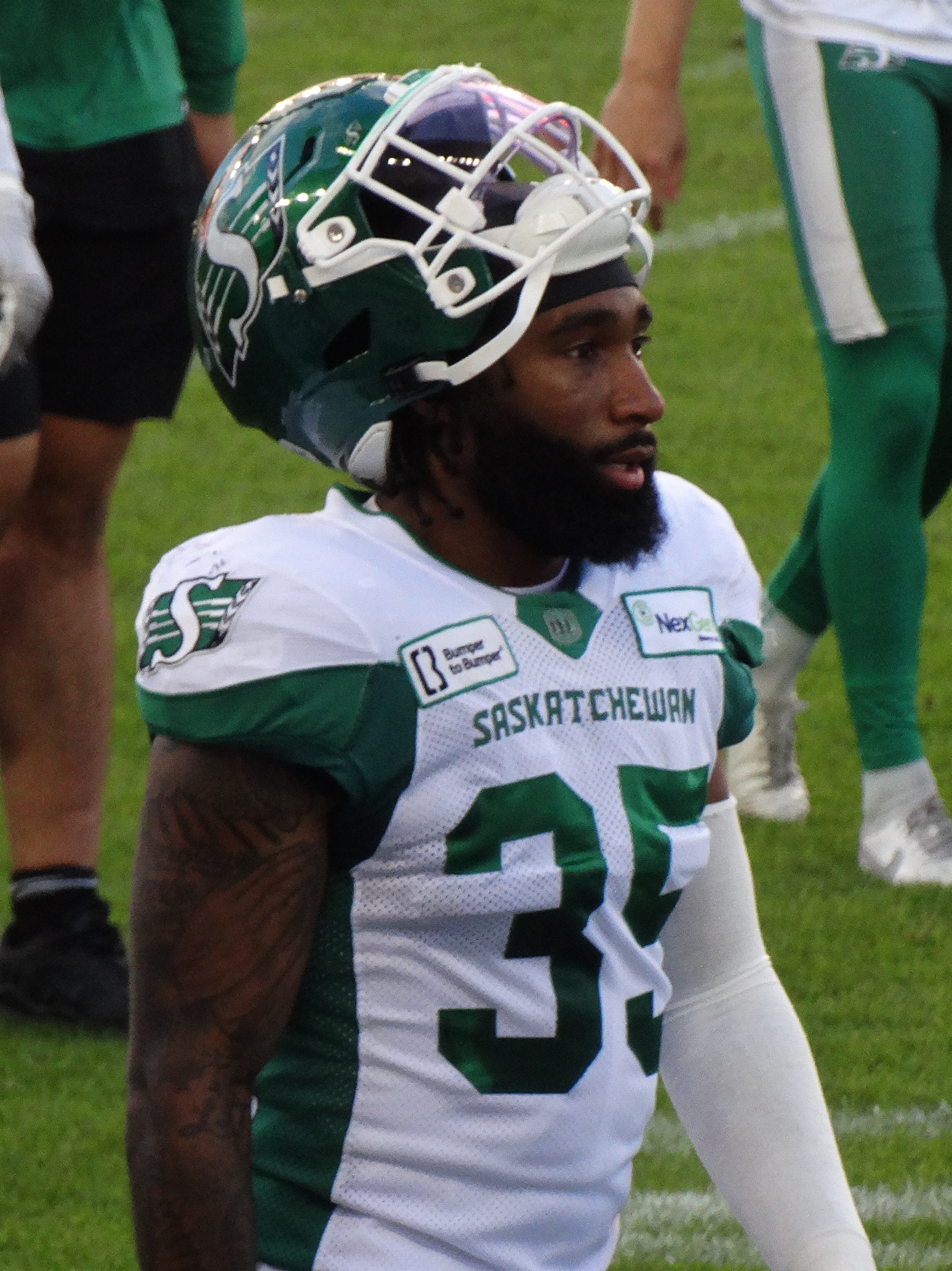
- Avery with the Saskatchewan Roughriders in 2024

No. 35
- Position: Linebacker

Personal information
- Born: March 22, 1999 (age 27); Grenada, Mississippi, U.S.
- Listed height: 6 ft 0 in (1.83 m)
- Listed weight: 232 lb (105 kg)

Career information
- High school: Grenada
- College: Louisville

Career history
- Chicago Bears (2022)*; Vegas Vipers (2023); Montreal Alouettes (2024)*; Saskatchewan Roughriders (2024–2025)
- * Offseason or practice squad member only

Awards and highlights
- Grey Cup champion (2025)
- Stats at Pro Football Reference
- Stats at CFL.ca

C. J. Avery (born March 22, 1999) is an American professional football linebacker. He played college football for the Louisville Cardinals.

== College career ==
Avery played college football for the Louisville Cardinals from 2017 to 2021. He played in 54 games where he had 349 total tackles, nine sacks, three interceptions, 16 pass breakups, two forced fumbles, and four fumble recoveries. As a four-year starter for Louisville, he led the team in tackles in 2019 and 2020.

== Professional career ==
=== Chicago Bears ===
Avery signed with the Chicago Bears of the National Football League (NFL) on May 6, 2022. He was later waived with an injury settlement on August 12, 2022.

=== Vegas Vipers ===
Avery was drafted by the Vegas Vipers in the eighth round, 64th overall of the 2023 XFL draft. In the first game of the season against the Arlington Renegades, Avery recorded the first interception of the 2023 season. He started all 10 games and finished with 62 tackles and one interception.

=== Montreal Alouettes ===
On January 16, 2024, it was announced that the Avery had signed with the Montreal Alouettes. He was released on March 5.

=== Saskatchewan Roughriders ===
Avery was signed by the Saskatchewan Roughriders on April 15. He played in the first game of the season against the Edmonton Elks on June 8 and recorded an interception. In his next game against the Hamilton Tiger-Cats, he would have another interception that would set up the game-winning field goal. In doing so, he became the first player since Harry Skipper in 1986 to have at least one interception in their first two games as a member of the Roughriders. On August 15, he was placed on 1-game injured list. On August 21, he was activated from the injured reserve. He would finish the season with 59 total tackles, one sack, three interceptions, and one forced fumble in 19 games. Avery became a free agent after the 2025 season.

== Personal life ==
Avery's grandfather played football at the University of Virginia and his dad, Chris Avery, played for the Arena Football League and World League of American Football in Spain. His cousin is Genard Avery.
