= Chris Avery =

American football player (born 1975)

No. 34
- Position: Fullback / Linebacker

Personal information
- Born: September 21, 1975 (age 51); Grenada, Mississippi, U.S.
- Listed height: 6 ft 1 in (1.85 m)
- Listed weight: 238 lb (108 kg)

Career information
- High school: Grenada (MS)
- College: Kentucky State
- NFL draft: 2000: undrafted

Career history
- Norfolk Nighthawks (2000); Dallas Cowboys (2000)*; Barcelona Dragons (2001)*; Grand Rapids Rampage (2001–2007); Kansas City Brigade (2008)
- * Offseason or practice squad member only

Awards and highlights
- ArenaBowl champion (2001); 2× AFL All-Ironman Team (2003, 2005); 2× Grand Rapids Rampage Ironman of the Year (2004–2005); 2× JUCO All-American (1997–1998)

Career AFL statistics
- Carries: 205
- Rushing Yards: 749
- Receptions / Avg.: 38 / 10.2
- Total Touchdowns: 45
- Tackles / Sacks: 148 / 14.5
- Stats at ArenaFan.com

Chris Avery (born September 21, 1975) is an American former professional football fullback / linebacker in the Arena Football League (AFL). He played college football at Kentucky State.

In his career, Avery has played for the Norfolk Nighthawks, Dallas Cowboys, Barcelona Dragons, Grand Rapids Rampage, and Kansas City Brigade.

== College career ==
Avery first attended Holmes Community College, where was named a JUCO All-American in each of his two seasons before transferring to Kentucky State in 1999. He was named a Division II All-American and named to the All-Southern Intercollegiate Athletic Conference team at Kentucky State in 1999 after recording 32 tackles and four sacks.

== Professional career ==
=== af2 ===
Avery played one season with the Norfolk Nighthawks of af2. He ranked as the team's second-leading rusher with 13 carries for 55 yards and two touchdowns in eight games along with eight tackles, one sack, one blocked field goal attempt and two forced fumbles.

=== National Football League ===
Avery then attended training camp with the Dallas Cowboys, but did not make the team.

=== NFL Europa ===
The next year, Avery was selected in the eighth round (46th overall) of the 2001 NFL Europa draft by the Barcelona Dragons. However, he chose to play in the Arena Football League.

=== Arena Football League ===
==== Grand Rapids Rampage ====
As a rookie in 2001, Avery played 11 games, including three starts (all postseason) for the Grand Rapids Rampage, which won ArenaBowl XV that same season. He also scored a rushing touchdown in the ArenaBowl. In 2002, he played in just two games, recording two carries for one yard, and 2.5 tackles. In 2003, he was named to the league's All-Ironman team for the first time. He led the team with 166 rushing yards, fifth in the league. He rushed for a season- and career-high 71 yards against the Dallas Desperados, and his 40-yard run was the longest of the season by any Grand Rapids player. He also recorded 26.5 tackles and 2.5 sacks on defense, and scored eight touchdowns. Then in 2004, he recorded 195 rushing yards to lead the team. He also recorded 31 tackles, and was named the team's Ironman of the Year. In 2005, he had one of the most dominant seasons by an AFL fullback, he led all fullback / linebackers in 13 offensive, defensive, and special teams categories. He earned a spot on the All-Ironman team for the second time after leading all fullback/linebackers in rushing yards with 251, yards per carry with 4.6, receptions with 13, receiving yards with 195, receiving touchdowns with three, total points scored with 104, total touchdowns with 17, total offensive yards with 446, offensive touches with 67, yards per play with 6.7, total tackles with 55.5, special teams tackles with 18.0, and first downs gained with 30. His 13 rushing touchdowns and 251 yards rushing were both career highs in addition to leading all fullback/linebackers. He scored a career-high four rushing touchdowns in week 11 against the Las Vegas Gladiators. Then in 2006, he recorded a career-high 15 receptions and appeared in all 16 games to become the all-time franchise leader with 78 games played in, over six seasons. He moved into 13th place all-time in rushing yards during a game in Dallas on April 15, 2006, when he rushed for 12 yards to pass Lincoln Coleman's 736 yards. Avery became second in rush yards among active players, trailing only former teammate Chris Ryan. Of Ryan's 855 yards, 266 came as a member of the Philadelphia Soul in 2004 and 2005, leaving Avery as the franchise's all-time leading rusher with 744 yards with Grand Rapids. Avery missed the entire 2007 season after suffering a knee injury on the first day of training camp.

==== Kansas City Brigade ====
Avery joined the Kansas City Brigade for the 2008 season where he was the back-up fullback, starting Mac Linebacker and was the teams long snapper. For the season, he recorded three carries for five yards, 31 tackles, 2.5 sacks, one forced fumble, and one fumble recovery. He was waived by the Brigade on September 15, 2008.

== Personal ==
Avery has two sons, including C. J. Avery, and two daughters.
