= Could It Be =

Could It Be may refer to:

- "Could It Be" (Georgina & Paul Giordimaina song), 1991 Eurovision Song Contest entry
- "Could It Be" (Charlie Worsham song)
- "Could It Be", song by the Bee Gees, from The Bee Gees Sing and Play 14 Barry Gibb Songs
- "Could It Be", 2000 single by Jahiem from the album Ghetto Love
- "Could It Be", song by Staind from 14 Shades of Grey
- "Could It Be", a song by Christy Romano from Kim Possible Movie: So the Drama.
