= Rubber band (disambiguation) =

A rubber band is a length of rubber and latex formed in a loop.

Rubber band or rubberband may also refer to:

- RubberBand, Cantopop band
- "Rubber Band" (song), a 1966 single by David Bowie
- "Rubberbandman" (song), a 1991 song by Yello
- "The Rubber Band", 1936 Nero Wolfe novel by Rex Stout
- "Rubber Band", a 1970s disco hit by The Trammps, from The Legendary Zing Album
- Bootsy's Rubber Band, a P-Funk spinoff group formed in 1976 and led by Bootsy Collins
- Rubber band, a technique to balance the difficulty of a video game
- Rubberband (Charlie Worsham album), released in 2013
- Rubberband (Miles Davis album), released in 2019
- Rubber Band (TV series), a Pakistani television series
- "Rubber Bands", a song by the Fire Theft from their self-titled album

== See also ==
- Kahani Rubberband Ki (lit. 'Story of a Rubberband'), a 2022 Indian Hindi-language film
