= Blanche Colton Williams =

American writer (1879–1944)

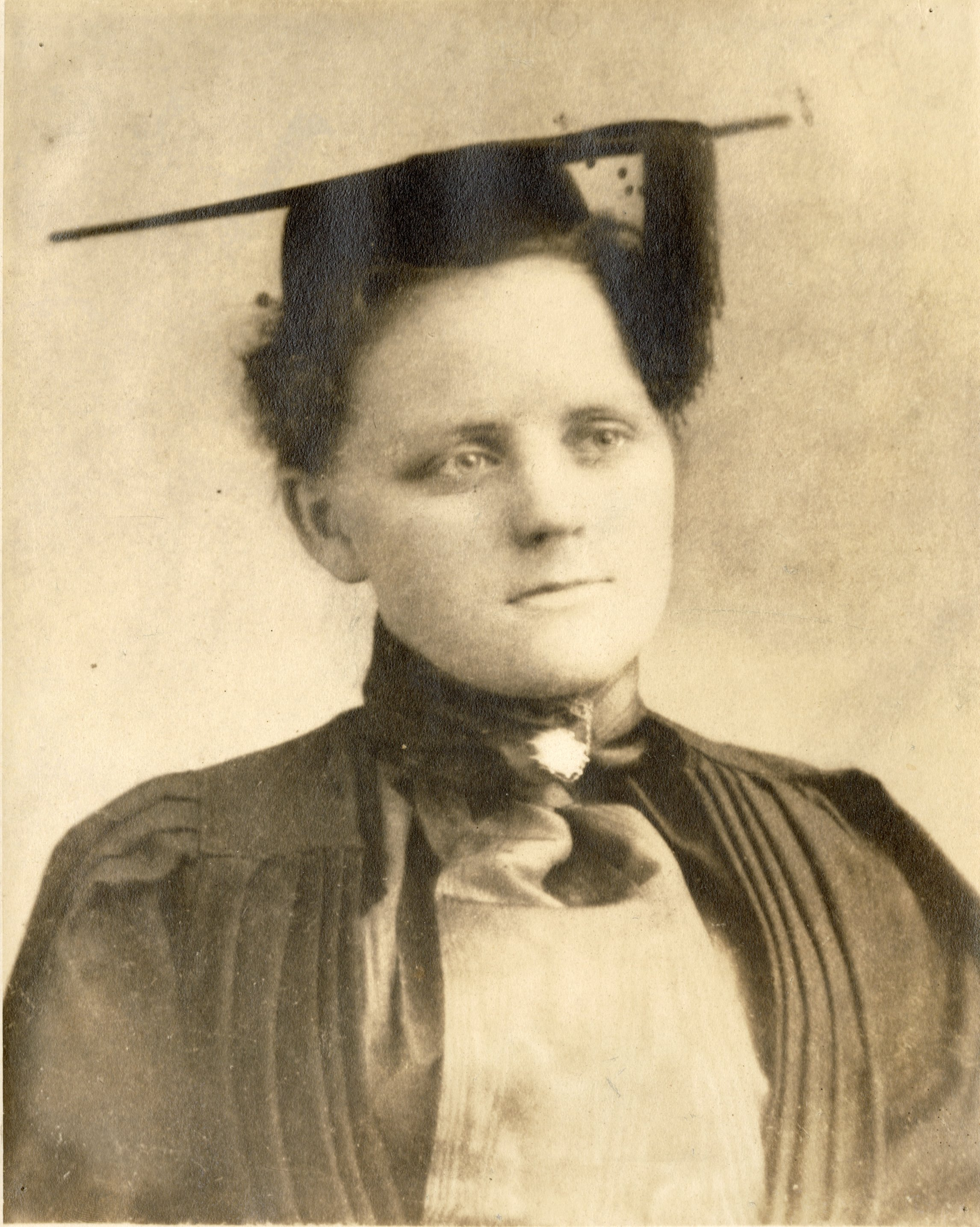
- Blanche Colton Williams wearing cap and gown, from a 1898 yearbook of the II&C
- Born: Blanche Gertrude Williams; February 15, 1879; Kosciusko, Mississippi, U.S.
- Died: August 9, 1944 (aged 65); Jackson, Mississippi, U.S.
- Education: Mississippi University for Women B.A. Columbia University M.A., Ph.D.
- Occupations: Educator, Author, Editor
- Writing career
- Period: 1913–1944
- Genres: Short Story, Biography
- Notable works: Handbook on Short Story Writing (1917), Our Short Story Writers (1925), Studying the Short Story (1926), and Short Story Writing (1930), George Eliot (1936), Clara Barton, Daughter of Destiny (1941), Editor, O'Henry Prize (1919-1932)

Blanche Colton Williams (February 10, 1879 – August 9, 1944) was an American author, editor, department head and professor of English literature, and pioneer in women’s higher education. She was known for her “groundbreaking work on structure and analysis of the short story” and is credited with having done more for the short story genre than anyone in her lifetime. An 1898 graduate of Industrial Institute and College in Columbus, Mississippi, the first public women’s university in the United States, Williams went on to a three-decade career at Hunter College, a women’s college in New York City.

== Life and education ==
=== Early life ===
Blanche Gertrude Williams was born February 10, 1879, in Kosciusko, Mississippi, the first of four children to Millard Fillmore "Peter" Williams (1852–1900) and Mary Ella Colton Williams (1859–1928). Her siblings include Wirt Alfred Williams (born 1882), Sidney Colton Williams (born 1885), and Lulu Upton Williams (born 1893).

Her father worked as a schoolteacher and, unusual for his time and place, admired Abraham Lincoln and believed that slavery was wrong. He spent much of his time teaching and reading, while his wife pursued the hard work of the family farm in order to protect his delicate health (he later died of tuberculosis). Williams inherited her father’s “love of learning and democratic ideas” and her mother’s “determination, common sense, and tolerance.” Her mother's influence further led Williams to replace her given second name with that of her mother's maiden name (Colton) when she later began a publishing career.

=== Industrial Institute and College ===
Williams entered Industrial Institute and College in 1894 at the age of 15. At II&C she discovered George Eliot. About that discovery, she would later write in her biography of Eliot: “[i]n the college dining room four hundred of us waited after dinner … for the first tap of the bell at which we rose to form in line and march out. While we waited, we read Thackeray, Bulwer-Lytton, Scott and Dickens. I came to George Eliot. By chance I discovered The Mill on the Floss. …. I said, ‘She knows. She knows country life, country girls and boys, how brothers and sisters feel about each other.’”

Upon graduating from II&C in 1898, Williams taught at two women’s colleges in Mississippi – first at Stanton College in Natchez for six years and later at Grenada College in Grenada for three years. While at Stanton, she received her first check for literary work, a $2.00 check from Lippincott’s Magazine. In 1907, she received an Alumnae fellowship for $500 for graduate study and moved to New York City.

She maintained close ties to II&C and many of its alumnae and faculty members throughout her life and often hosted them in New York. She served as President of the II&C Alumnae Association in 1913-1914 and was later selected as the 50th Anniversary Commencement Speaker at what by that time was known as Mississippi State College for Women. She also maintained close ties to her home state with annual visits and weekly correspondence with family and friends.

=== Later education ===
Williams used her Alumnae Scholarship to earn MA and PhD degrees from Columbia University in 1908 and 1913 respectively; as a graduate student she also taught short fiction at Columbia (which she would do until 1926). Her dissertation, Gnomic Poetry in Anglo-Saxon, was published in 1914.

== Career ==
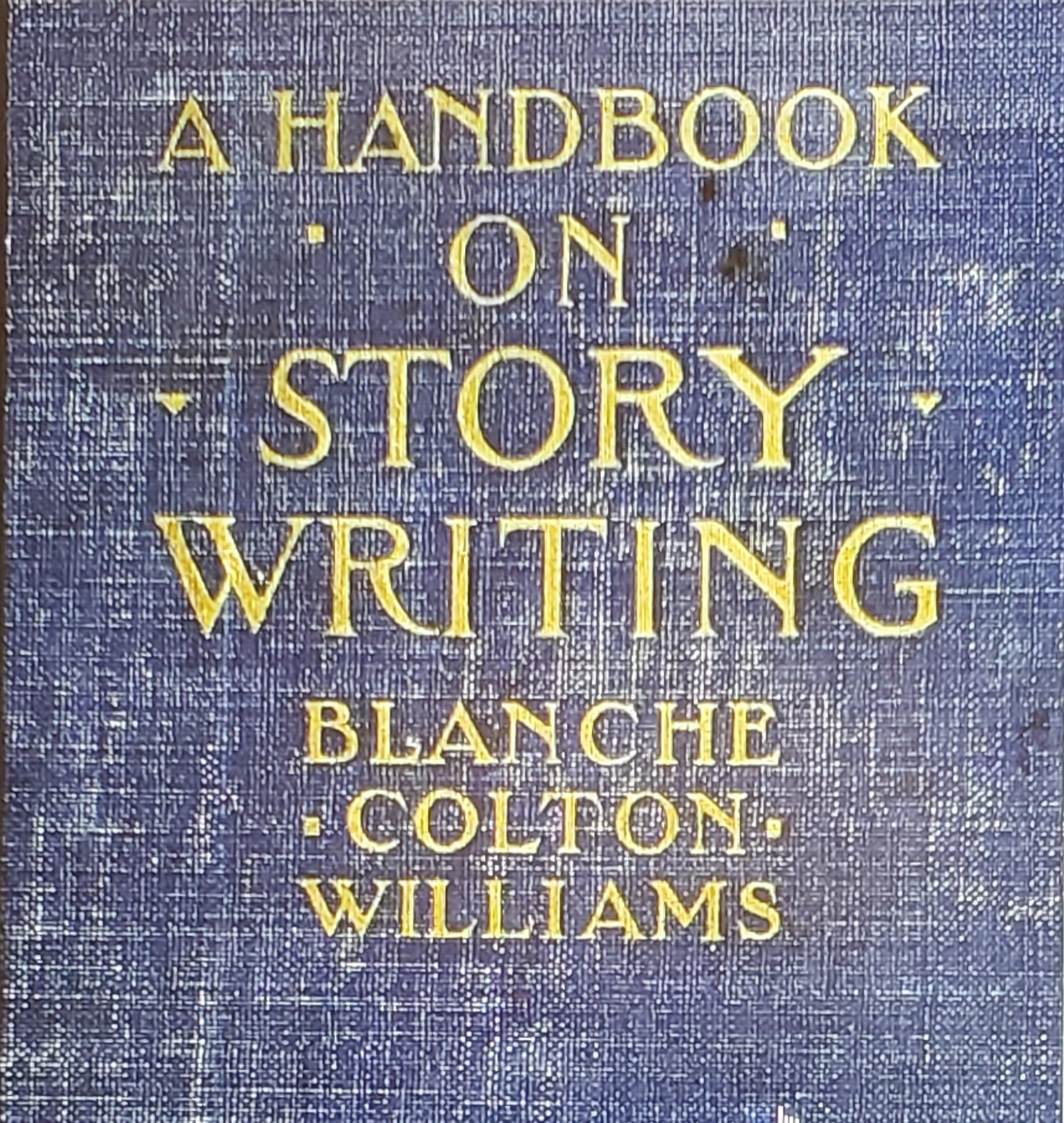
A Handbook on Story Writing (1917), considered to possibly be the first textbook on short story writing.

While still a graduate student in 1910, Williams began teaching Old English and the Short Story at Hunter College. This began a career that continued for nearly three decades, mentoring women writers at an institution that was, at the time, believed to be the largest women’s college in the world. She was promoted to full professor and head of the English department at Hunter College in 1926, leading a department of nearly fifty faculty members. She retired from her position at Hunter College in 1939 in order to travel and write. The “Blanche Colton Williams Graduate Fellowship” at the college was established in her honor for English majors. In addition to the 3,000 students she taught at Columbia and Hunter, she reached thousands more through books she wrote on crafting short stories. Her 1917 work, Handbook on Short Story Writing, has been described as “the first practical aid to growing young writers that was put on the market in this country.” She later wrote three additional books that transformed the short study medium: Our Short Story Writers (1925), Studying the Short Story (1926), and Short Story Writing (1930). These textbooks, in addition to her forty years of service, were cited as testaments to her enduring legacy in a New York Times editorial written upon her retirement from Hunter College.

== Writing and editing ==
=== O’Henry Prize and short stories ===
In 1919, Williams accepted the chair of the O’Henry Memorial Awards Committee and served as its chair until 1932. For fifteen years she edited the O’Henry Award short story volumes. As chair of the committee, she evaluated sixty thousand submissions during her service and was heralded by her editorial colleagues for possessing a “sharp eye for a superior story.” Her influence on and support of short story writers was especially important for women writers and writers of the Harlem Renaissance.

=== Biographies ===
Williams spent much of the last decade of her life writing not the short stories for which her name had become so widely attached, but instead biographies. She traveled to England to research George Eliot, living in the towns and even the houses where the author lived. The resulting work was described in the New York Times Book Section: “Scholarly in the extreme, it is nevertheless winning in the manner of writing; sound, it is also vividly dramatic, wholly satisfactory, analytical portrayal of a great novelist and a great woman,” reaching “a high level of biographical writing.”

The international success of George Eliot in 1936 prompted Williams to continue her biographical research. Her 1941 biography, Clara Barton, Daughter of Destiny, explored hundreds of unpublished letters. Its release coincided with a great Red Cross drive and parade in New York City with many stores featuring the book at the center of elaborate displays. Her biography of John Keats, Forever Young, appeared in 1943 and was described by New Republic as “unpretentious and free of sentimentality” and “engaging and fresh.”

== Death and legacy ==
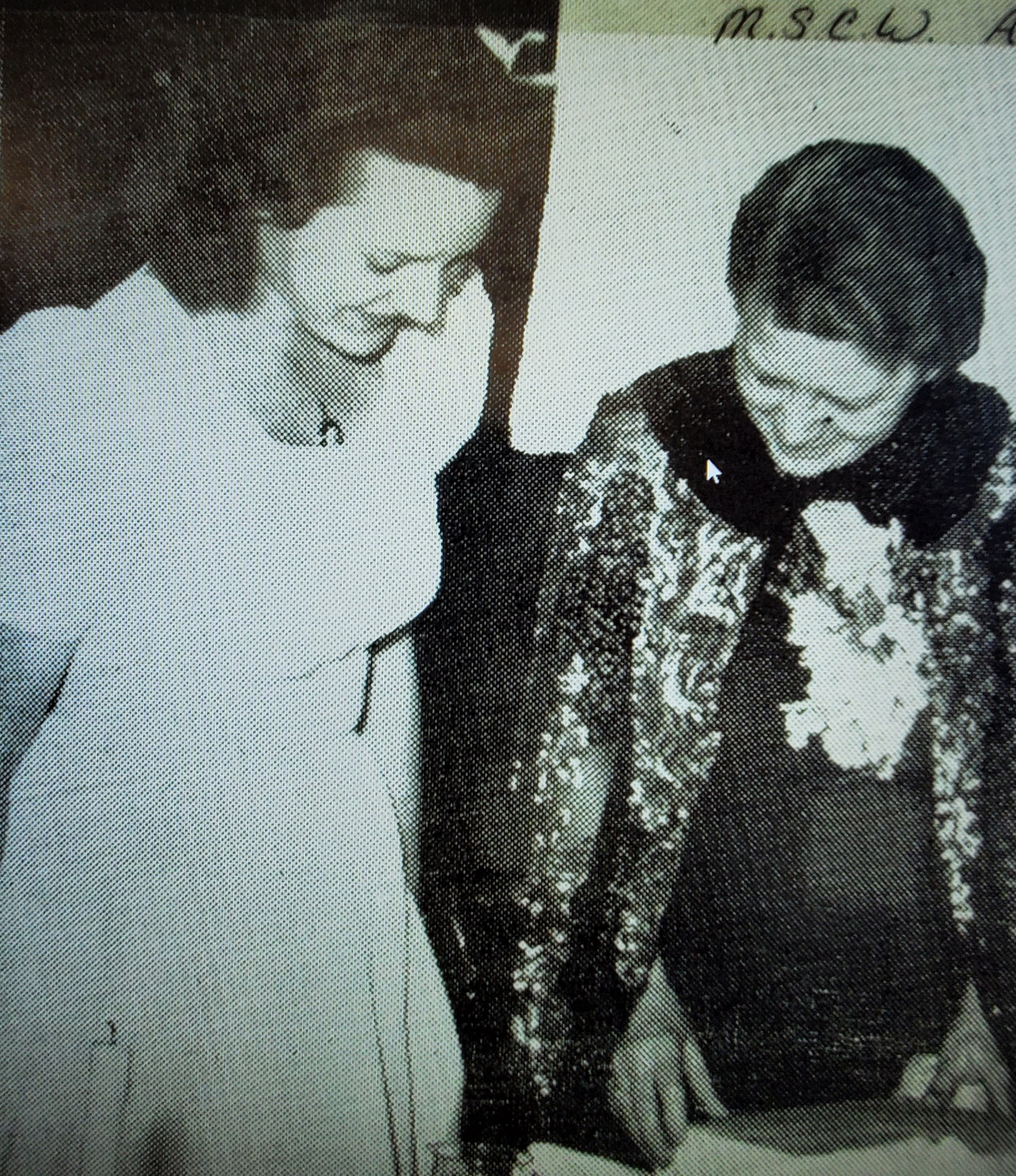
Williams (right) is presented birthday present by student president at her alma mater.(1941).

=== Death ===
In 1943, Williams traveled to Mississippi to visit family and to conduct a series of lectures at her alma mater and never returned to New York. In the spring of the following year, suffering from cancer, she moved in with family members and died on August 9, 1944, in Jackson, MS. Her ashes were interred at the foot of her parents’ graves in Kosciusko. Newspapers throughout New York City, as well as national periodicals, including Time Magazine, memorialized Williams upon her death.

=== Women writers ===
Williams dedicated much of her life to the literary work of others. In addition to the women writers she taught at Hunter College, Williams provided critical advocacy and promotion of women who wrote professionally. At the time, only eight percent of publications were written by women. In all of her discussions and edited volumes, including Our Short Story Writers and the O’Henry Prize volumes, the percentage of women writers covered was between 35 and 50%.

=== Harlem Renaissance ===
Williams was invited to serve as a judge for Opportunity’s first literary contest. The literary contest became essential to the promotion of the Harlem Renaissance's writers and artists. The May 1925 issue of Opportunity lists a number of prizewinners who went on to enjoy successful publishing careers: Claude McKay, Zora Neale Hurston, Langston Hughes, Countee Cullen, Sterling Brown, and Franklin Frazier.

Williams later recommended prize-winning contest stories to the O’Henry Prize Committee, including John Matheus’s "Fog" (which won first prize in the Short Story division), Arthur Huff Fauset’s “Symphonesque,” and Eugene Gordon’s “Rootbound.” She later met Dorothy West at the Opportunity contest banquet and became an important champion and mentor of the young author’s work. West’s contest submission was recommended by Williams to the committee, and later her short story, “An Important Man,” was recommended for publication in Columbia University’s literary magazine.

=== Collections ===
A collection of over 1000 short story anthologies, first editions, and annotated volumes donated by Williams resides at the Fant Memorial Library at her alma mater, now named Mississippi University for Women. The collection includes “her short story collection, one of the most complete in the world … as are 22 volumes on Keats, first editions of George Eliot’s novels, and rare editions of Edgar Allan Poe.” The collection also contains her “prized possession,” a crayon portrait of Eliot by Samuel Laurence (1860).

Williams also donated over 600 volumes to Delta State Teachers College, where her brother Wirt A. Williams served as department head of social sciences.

== Selected list of works ==
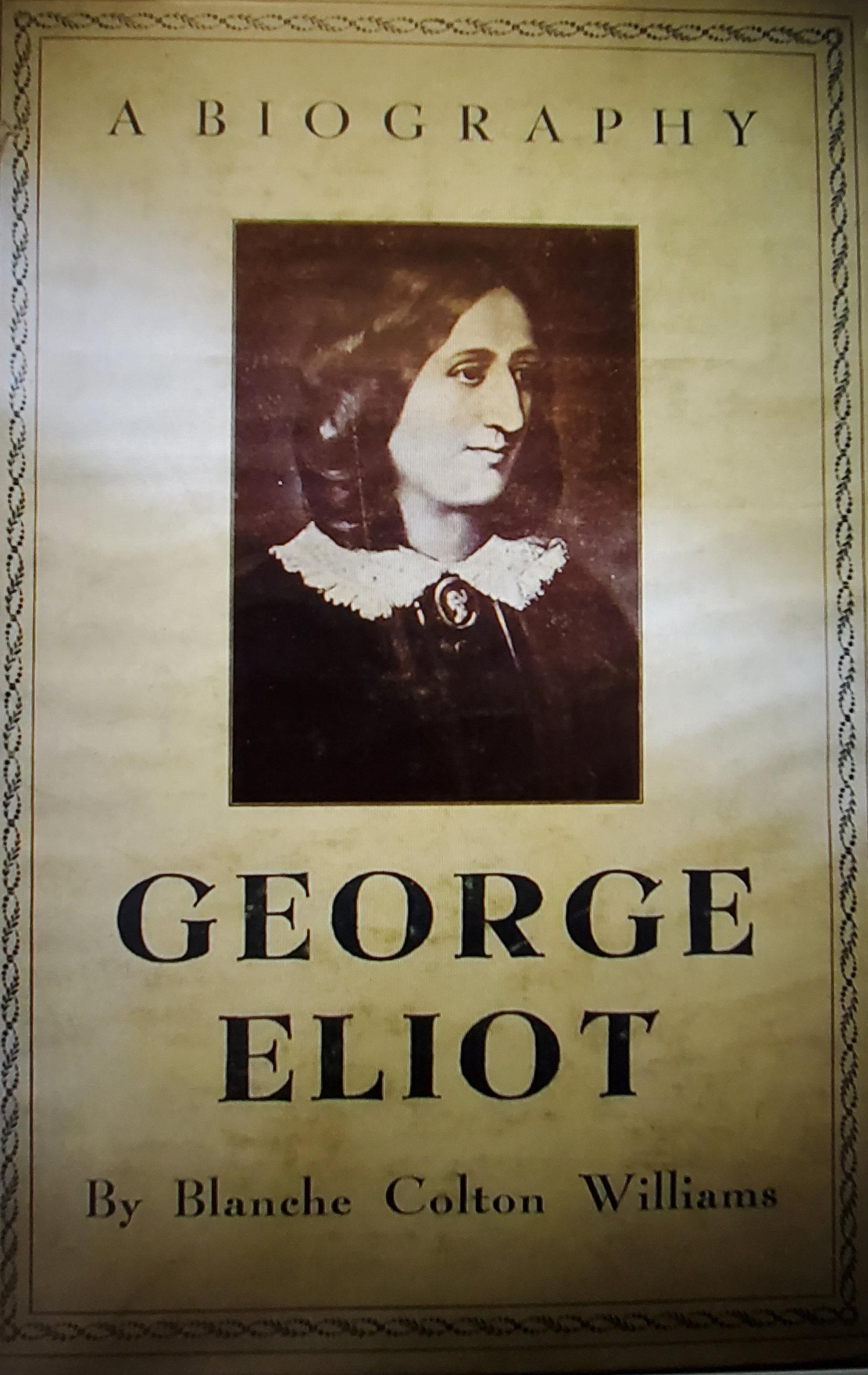
George Eliot (1936), Williams' first biography.

=== Original works ===
- Gnomic poetry in Anglo-Saxon. Columbia University Press. 1914.
- A handbook on story writing. Dodd, Mead. 1917.
- How to study "The Best short stories". Small, Maynard & Company. 1919.
- Our Short Story Writers. Small, Maynard & Company. 1920.
- Clara Barton, Daughter of destiny. Lippincott's. 1941.
- George Eliot. Macmillan. 1936.
- Forever young, the life of John Keats. Putnam's. 1943.

=== Edited works ===
- O. Henry Memorial Prize Winning Stories. Doubleday. Annually, 1919 – 1934.
- Thrice Told Tales. Dodd. 1924.
- Short Stories for College Classes. Appleton. 1929.
- The Mystery and the Detective. Appleton. 1938.
