= J. J. Russell =

American football player (born 1998)

Jarvis J. Russell
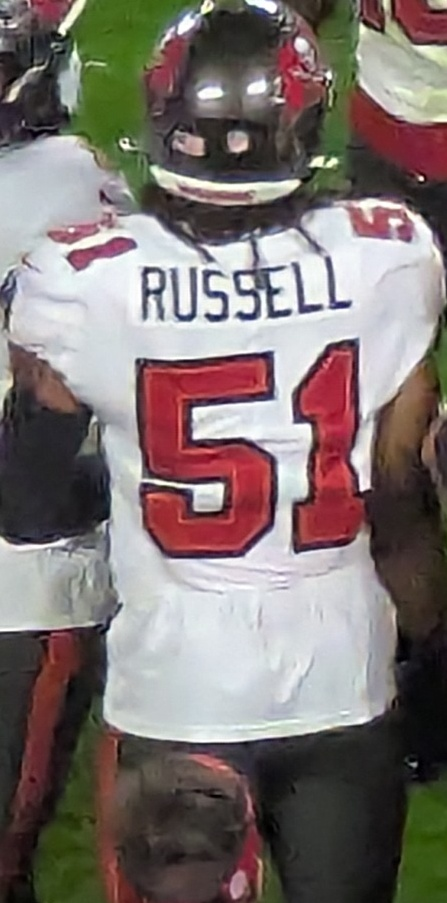
- Russell with the Tampa Bay Buccaneers in 2024

Profile
- Position: Linebacker

Personal information
- Born: October 12, 1998 (age 28); Grenada, Mississippi, U.S.
- Listed height: 6 ft 1 in (1.85 m)
- Listed weight: 225 lb (102 kg)

Career information
- High school: Grenada (MS)
- College: Memphis (2017–2021)
- NFL draft: 2022: undrafted

Career history
- Tampa Bay Buccaneers (2022–2024); Arizona Cardinals (2025)

Awards and highlights
- First-team All-AAC (2021)

Career NFL statistics as of 2024
- Total tackles: 49
- Sacks: 1
- Fumble recoveries: 1
- Touchdowns: 1
- Stats at Pro Football Reference

Jarvis J. Russell (born October 12, 1998) is an American professional football linebacker. He played college football for the Memphis Tigers.

== Early life ==
Russell was born October 12, 1998, in Grenada, Mississippi, where he attended Grenada High School.

== College career ==
In 2017, Russell enrolled at the University of Memphis. In 2021, he led the Tigers with 123 tackles, being named first-team All-American Athletic Conference.

== Professional career ==
Pre-draft measurables
Height	Weight	Arm length	Hand span	Wingspan	40-yard dash	10-yard split	20-yard split	20-yard shuttle	Three-cone drill	Vertical jump	Broad jump	Bench press
6 ft 0 3/8 in (1.84 m)	227 lb (103 kg)	33 in (0.84 m)	10 3/8 in (0.26 m)	6 ft 5 7/8 in (1.98 m)	4.70 s	1.62 s	2.66 s	4.53 s	7.27 s	36.0 in (0.91 m)	9 ft 10 in (3.00 m)	26 reps
All values from Pro Day

=== Tampa Bay Buccaneers ===
Russell went undrafted in the 2022 NFL draft but signed with the Tampa Bay Buccaneers as an undrafted free agent on May 2, 2022. He was waived on August 30 but re-signed to the practice squad on August 31. On October 27 Russell was elevated to the active roster and made his NFL debut against the Baltimore Ravens playing 26 snaps. He was signed to the active roster on November 2. He was waived on November 26 and re-signed to the practice squad. He was promoted to the active roster on December 27. He was waived on January 16, 2023, but signed a reserve/future contract with the team two days later.

On August 29, 2023, Russell was waived by the Buccaneers and re-signed to the practice squad. He was promoted to the active roster on November 22.

=== Arizona Cardinals ===
On May 21, 2025, Russell signed with the Arizona Cardinals on a one-year contract. He suffered a head and neck injury in practice and was placed on season-ending injured reserve on August 26, 2025.
