= Donald P. Gregg =

American politician and diplomat (born 1927)

Ambassador Donald Gregg

United States Ambassador to South Korea
- In office September 27, 1989 – February 27, 1993
- President: George H. W. Bush; Bill Clinton
- Preceded by: James R. Lilley
- Succeeded by: James T. Laney

Personal details
- Born: Donald Phinney Gregg; December 5, 1927 (age 98) Hastings-on-Hudson, New York, U.S.
- Spouse: Margaret Curry-Gregg
- Children: 1
- Education: Williams College (BA)
- Profession: Diplomat

Military service
- Allegiance: United States
- Branch/service: United States Army
- Years of service: 1945-1947

Donald Phinney Gregg (born December 5, 1927) is a retired American politician, CIA employee, and U.S. Ambassador to South Korea. Gregg worked for the Central Intelligence Agency for 31 years, from 1951 to 1982. He was a National Security Council advisor (1979–1982) and National Security Advisor to U.S. Vice President George H. W. Bush (1982–1989), United States Ambassador to Korea (1989–1993), and the chairman of the board of The Korea Society (until 2009), where he called for greater engagement with North Korea.

== Background and family life ==
After graduating from high school, Gregg enlisted in the military in 1945 and received training as a cryptanalyst, but did not finish in time to be posted overseas. He then attended Williams College, in Williamstown, Massachusetts, from 1947 to 1951, majoring in philosophy. Here he was recruited by the CIA.

Gregg's father was Abel J. Gregg of Washington, the national secretary of boys' work of the Young Men's Christian Association. His wife was Margaret Curry. Their daughter Lucy Steuart Gregg married the writer Christopher Buckley, the son of conservative journalist and author William F. Buckley Jr. His nephew is podcasting pioneer and former MTV VJ Adam Curry.

== Career ==
Gregg joined the Central Intelligence Agency in 1951. He served in Japan from 1964 to 1973. Gregg served as CIA station chief in South Korea from 1973 to 1975, an assignment he personally requested. During this time Gregg's personal complaint to the head of the presidential protective force about the Korean National Intelligence Service's involvement in the death by torture of a dissident U.S.-trained professor led to its chief, Lee Hu-rak, being replaced, and his successor enacting a prohibition on torture. Gregg, noting that his boss, Ted Shackley, had warned him against such interference, later described this as "one of the best things I did as a CIA officer".

From 1975 to 1980, Gregg served at the CIA's headquarters and in Washington, D.C.; his responsibilities included responding to the "Pike Committee" investigating the CIA. In 1979 Gregg, his career in the CIA stalled by Stansfield Turner's new regime, took a post in the United States National Security Council (NSC) as Asia policy and intelligence matters specialist. He remained there during the transition from the Carter administration to the Reagan administration, and became Director of the NSC's Intelligence Directorate in 1981. He was appointed National Security Advisor to Vice President George H. W. Bush in August 1982, resigning from the CIA at this time. He remained National Security Advisor for the remainder of the Reagan administration.

In 1989, Japan expert and lobbyist Craig J. Spence was linked to a White House guard who allowed him to take late-night White House tours with guests that included callboys. Spence suggested that these "midnight tours" were arranged by "top level" persons, implicating Gregg. Gregg denied the allegations, calling them "absolute bull." Henry Vinson, the convicted operator of a DC-area gay escort service, has confirmed that Gregg solicited male escorts with his government-issued MasterCard during his time as NSC advisor.

== Maxwell School at Syracuse University ==
Gregg, while at the Korea Society during President George W. Bush's administration, helped establish a program "of bringing North Koreans for information technology training and other issues" to Maxwell. Following a North Korean nuclear agreement with the United States in February 2012, North Korea's vice foreign minister and envoy to nuclear disarmament negotiations Ri Yong Ho reportedly planned to attend a forum at Maxwell. Gregg also appeared on PBS News Hour to discuss the agreement with Balbina Hwang, visiting professor at Georgetown University and a Korea specialist at the State Department during the last Bush administration.

In September 2009, Gregg retired to the role of chairman emeritus of The Korea Society and was replaced as chairman by Thomas C. Hubbard. In 2014, Gregg published Pot Shards: Fragments of a Life Lived in CIA, the White House, and the Two Koreas ISBN 978-0990447115, a memoir.

== Awards ==
- National Intelligence Distinguished Service Medal
- Department of Defense Medal for Distinguished Public Service
- Honorary PhD in international relations from Sogang University
- Secretary of Defense Medal for Outstanding Public Service (2001)
