= James Laney =

James Laney may refer to:

- James T. Laney (1927–2026), American educator and ambassador
- Pete Laney (James Earl Laney, born 1943), American politician
