= Ruth Hughey =

American literary scholar (1899-1980)

- Born: September 11, 1899; Gentry, Arkansas, U.S.
- Died: April 29, 1980 (aged 80); Atlanta, Georgia, U.S.
- Occupation: Historian
- Relatives: James T. Laney (nephew)
- Awards: Guggenheim Fellow (1935)

Academic background
- Education: Galloway Female College (BA); Columbia University (MA); Cornell University (PhD)
- Thesis: Cultural interests of women in England from 1524 to 1640 indicated in the writings of the women: a survey (1932)

Academic work
- Sub-discipline: John Harington
- Institutions: Henderson-Brown College; Grenada College; University of Missouri; Ohio State University

Ruth Willard Hughey (September 11, 1899 – April 29, 1980) was an American literary scholar. A 1935 Guggenheim Fellow, she was editor of The Arundel Harington Manuscript of Tudor Poetry (1960) and John Harington of Stepney: Tudor Gentleman, His Life and Works (1971). She taught English as part of the faculty of Henderson-Brown College, Grenada College, the University of Missouri, and Ohio State University, becoming professor emeritus at the latter.

== Biography ==
Hughey was born on September 11, 1899, in Gentry, Arkansas. She obtained a BA from Galloway Female College in 1920, an MA from Columbia University in 1921, and after summer studies at Northwestern University in 1925, a PhD in 1932 from Cornell University. Her doctoral dissertation was titled Cultural interests of women in England from 1524 to 1640 indicated in the writings of the women: a survey.

After teaching English and Latin at St. Mary's Episcopal School from 1921 to 1923, Hughey worked as an English teacher at Henderson-Brown College (1923-1924), Grenada College (1924-1926), and the University of Missouri (1926-1929). She was a 1932-1933 American Association of University Women Margaret E. Maltby. She later worked at Ohio State University, eventually becoming a professor emeritus.

In 1935, Hughey was awarded a Guggenheim Fellowship to edit John Harington's poetry manuscript and study his role in literary history. Her annotated version of the manuscript, The Arundel Harington Manuscript of Tudor Poetry, was published by Ohio State University Press in 1960. (Note: Reviews of this book:) She donated her original transcriptions to Ohio State University Libraries in 1972. In 1971, she published the book John Harington of Stepney: Tudor Gentleman, His Life and Works. (Note: Reviews of this book:)

Hughey died on April 29, 1980 in Atlanta, where she had moved following her retirement. Her nephew was James T. Laney, who served as president of Emory University and United States Ambassador to South Korea.

== Bibliography ==
- The Arundel Harington Manuscript of Tudor Poetry (1960)
- John Harington of Stepney: Tudor Gentleman, His Life and Works (1971)
