= Beulah Russell =

American mathematician (1878–1940)

- Born: October 22, 1878; Union County, Kentucky
- Died: February 22, 1940; Newport News, Virginia
- Education: University of Chicago
- Scientific career
- Fields: Mathematics
- Institutions: College of William & Mary
- Thesis: Relation between the definite integral and summation of series (1919)

Beulah Russell, christened Beatrice Beulah Russell and also known as Bulah Russell, (October 22, 1878 – February 22, 1940) was an American mathematician.

== Education ==
Beulah graduated from Randolph–Macon Woman's College with a Bachelor of Arts in 1903, and graduated from the University of Chicago with a Master of Arts in 1919.

== Career ==
From 1903 to 1905 Beulah taught at Lafayette College as an instructor in mathematics. From 1905 to 1909 she taught at Grenada College as a professor of mathematics. From 1909 to 1925 she taught at Randolph–Macon Woman's College as an instructor of mathematics and an adjunct professor of mathematics. In 1925 she became an associate professor of mathematics at the College of William & Mary.

In a 1923 edition of The American Mathematical Monthly it is recorded that Beulah was elected to membership in the Mathematical Association of America.

In 1930 Beulah became the first female professor to attend the Edinburgh Mathematical Society Colloquium held in St Andrews, Scotland.
