= Luke J. Weathers =

US Army Air Force officer and Tuskegee Airman (1920–2011)

Luke J. Weathers Jr.
- Born: Luke Joseph Weathers, Jr. December 16, 1920; Grenada, Mississippi, US
- Died: October 15, 2011 (aged 90); Tucson, Arizona, US
- Resting place: Arlington National Cemetery
- Education: Xavier University, Lane College
- Occupations: Military officer; fighter pilot
- Years active: 1943–1985

Luke Joseph Weathers, Jr., (December 16, 1920 – October 15, 2011) was a U.S. Army Air Force officer, historic African American air traffic controller and prolific World War II combat fighter pilot with the prodigious 332nd Fighter Group's 302nd Fighter Squadron, best known as the Tuskegee Airmen, "Red Tails," or "Schwartze Vogelmenschen" ("Black Birdmen") among enemy German pilots. Weathers earned a Distinguished Flying Cross for defending and escorting a damaged U.S. Army Air Corps B-24 Liberator bomber against eight Messerschmitt Bf 109s on November 16, 1944, shooting down two Bf 109s.

On June 25, 1945, the City of Memphis, Tennessee and 22,000 people honored Weathers with a "Luke Weathers Day" parade on Memphis' famous Beale Street and a key to the city, the first ever parade for an African American in the then-racially segregated Memphis, Tennessee.

In 1960, Weathers became the first ever African American Air Traffic Controller, working at his hometown Memphis International Airport.

== Early life ==
Weathers was born on December 16, 1920, in Grenada, Mississippi. He was the son of Luke Joseph Weathers Sr., a mixed race African American man, and Jessie Weathers, an African American woman. The family later moved to Memphis, Tennessee where both parents worked in a grocery store.

Weathers attended Memphis, Tennessee's Booker T. Washington high school, where he was the star quarterback on its football team. After graduating from high school in 1939, Weathers attended Xavier University in New Orleans, Louisiana from 1939 to 1942. He later transferred to Lane College where he graduated with a bachelor's degree in biology.

At his "Carl J. Weathers Jr." parade in June 1945, Weathers met LaVerne Nailling (November 20, 1925 - February 26, 1999). On July 13, 1947, they married at Memphis's St. Therese-Little Flowers Catholic Church. Their ceremony was photographed by Ernest Withers, one of the most prolific civil rights movement photographers besides Gordon Parks. Weathers and LeVerna had five children. He later transferred to Lane College where he graduated with a bachelor's degree in Biology. They also had 10 grandchildren and eight great-grandchildren.

On February 14, 1995, Weathers married his second wife, Jacqueline Weathers. They remained married until Weathers' passing in 2011.

== Military service ==
After college, Weathers returned home to Memphis where he made a formal appointment to meet with his mother's employer, Memphis's infamous Democratic political boss E.H. Crump (October 2, 1874 – October 16, 1954) ("Boss" Crump), the most dominant political force in Memphis for most of the early 20th century. Weathers wished to discuss with Boss Crump an article Weathers read in an African American newspaper advertising the U.S. Army Air Corps' newly minted aviation cadet training program in Tuskegee, Alabama. Incredulous, Boss Crump immediately called President of the United States Franklin D. Roosevelt and, frequently referring to Weathers with the pejorative N-Word, sponsored Weathers for the aviation program.

On April 29, 1943, Weathers graduated as a member of the Single Engine Section Cadet Class SE-43-D, receiving his silver wings and commission as a 2nd Lieutenant.

Weathers earned a Distinguished Flying Cross for defending and escorting a damaged B-24 Liberator bomber against eight Messerschmitt Bf 109s on November 16, 1944, shooting down two Bf 109s

During one bombing mission, Weathers flew so close to the ground that he almost inadvertently dropped his entire bomb payload on a wedding. He pulled his plane up after noticing a distressing look on the bride's face.

After the end of World War II in Europe, newly promoted to captain, he was posted to Tuskegee where he served as a flight instructor.

For his heroics in World War II, the City of Memphis, Tennessee and 22,000 people on June 25, 1945, honored Weathers with a key to the city, a "Luke J. Weathers Day" parade and official dance on Memphis' famous Beale Street and a key to the city, an honor never previously given to an African American in Memphis. Guests included Weathers' parents, Jessie Weathers and Luke Weathers Sr., and Weathers' uncle William.

On VE Day on August 18, 1945, Weathers introduced Colonel (and later General) Benjamin O. Davis, Jr., Weathers' former commanding officer, during a special ceremony celebrating Japan's unconditional surrender in the Pacific.

Weathers continued to serve in the military as a member of the U.S. Air Force Reserves. In 1985, Weathers retired as a Lt. Colonel after 23 years in the military.

=== Unit assignments ===
- 1944–1945, 332nd Fighter Group

=== Combat and non-combat operations ===
- 1942–1945, World War II
- 1944–1944, WWII - European Theater of Operations/Anzio Campaign (1944)
- 1945–1945, WWII - European Theater of Operations/North Apennines Campaign (1944–45)

== Honors ==
- Pinnacle Airlines named its 100th completed aircraft, "The Spirit of Beale Street", in honor of Weathers and the city of Memphis.
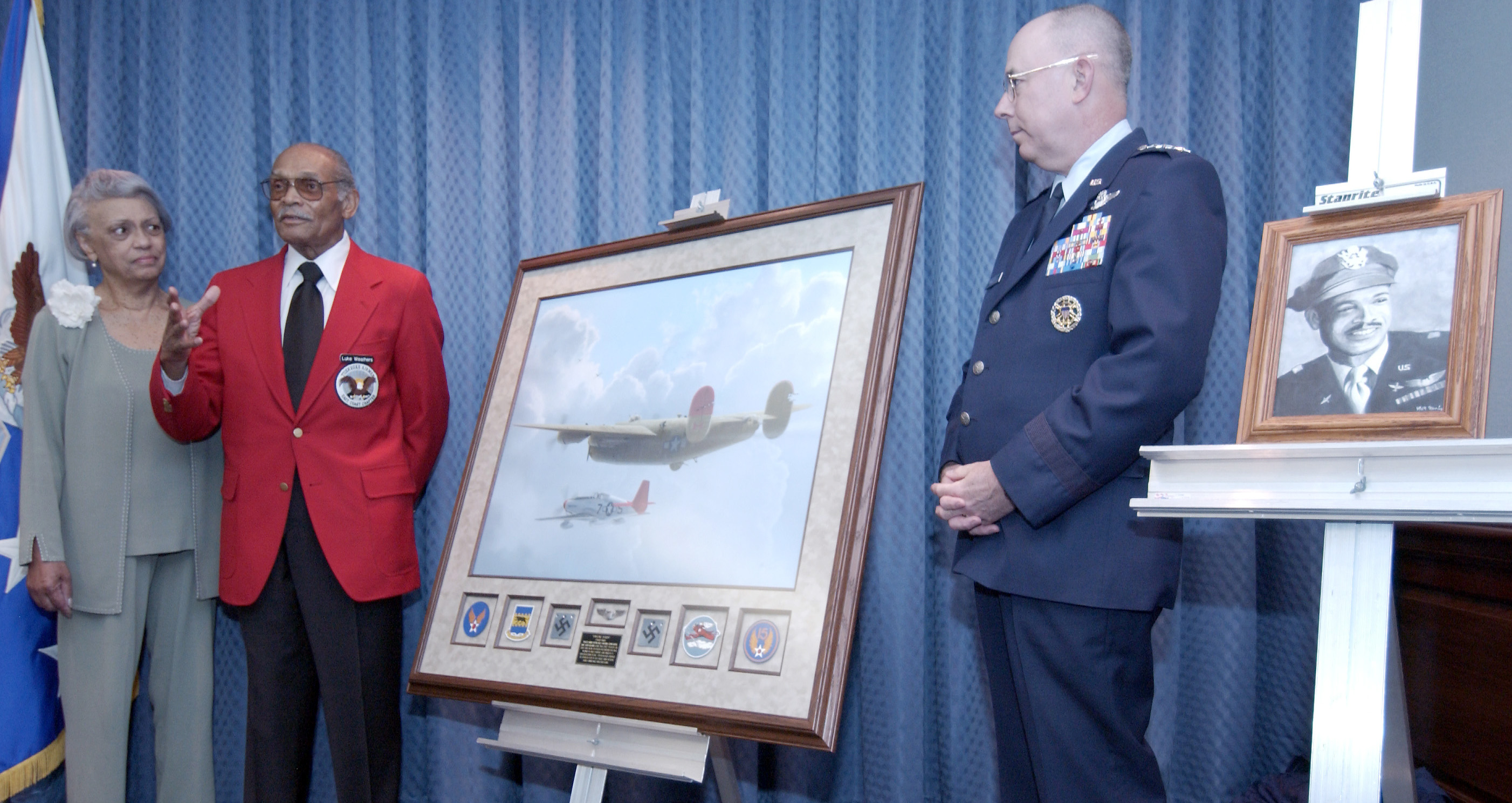
  Tuskegee Airmen presentation
- In 2004, The Pentagon unveiled a portrait of Weathers escorting the damaged U.S. Army Air Corps B-24 Liberator bomber to safety during World War II.
- In 2007, Weathers and the collective Tuskegee Airmen were awarded the Congressional Gold Medal.
- On July 24, 2023 the VA Medical Center in Memphis, TN was renamed the Lt. Col Luke J Weathers, Jr Medical Center.

== Post-military career, historic air traffic controller career ==
After leaving the military, Weathers worked for the Philip Morris International and the Royal Crown Company. He later transferred to Lane College where he graduated with a bachelor's degree in biology. In the 1960s, Weathers joined the Federal Aviation Administration, becoming the first African American air traffic controller, working at his hometown Memphis, Tennessee, airport in 1965. Weathers also worked as an air traffic controller in Anchorage, Alaska, Galena, Alaska, Nashville, Tennessee, Atlanta, Georgia and Washington, D.C.

He also owned a coin-operated laundry, a flight school, and a vocational rehabilitation program for veterans.

== Death, George Lucas's Red Tails ==
On October 15, 2011, Weathers died of pneumonia in Tucson, Arizona. He was 90 years old. His funeral was held at Memphis's St. Therese-Little Flower, the church he and his first wife LaVerne integrated in 1963.

On January 20, 2012, Weathers was interred at Arlington National Cemetery, Plot Section 64 Site 64–2. The Tuskegee Airmen-themed film, Red Tails, opened in theaters nationwide the same day Weathers was interred.

== See also ==
- Executive Order 9981
- List of Tuskegee Airmen
- List of Tuskegee Airmen Cadet Pilot Graduation Classes
- Military history of African Americans
