= Emmanuel Forbes =

American football player (born 2001)

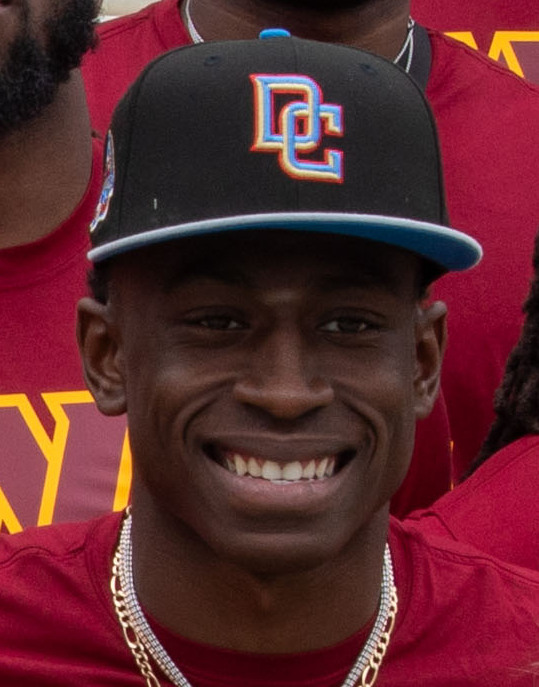
- Forbes with the Washington Commanders in 2023

No. 1 – Los Angeles Rams
- Position: Cornerback
- Roster status: Active

Personal information
- Born: January 13, 2001 (age 25); Grenada, Mississippi, U.S.
- Listed height: 6 ft 0 in (1.83 m)
- Listed weight: 173 lb (78 kg)

Career information
- High school: Grenada
- College: Mississippi State (2020–2022)
- NFL draft: 2023: 1st round, 16th overall pick

Career history
- Washington Commanders (2023–2024); Los Angeles Rams (2024–present)

Awards and highlights
- Consensus All-American (2022); First-team All-SEC (2022); Second-team All-SEC (2021); SEC All-Freshman (2020)

Career NFL statistics as of Week 8, 2026
- Total tackles: 104
- Forced fumbles: 1
- Pass deflections: 33
- Interceptions: 5
- Stats at Pro Football Reference

Emmanuel Forbes Jr. (born January 13, 2001) is an American professional football cornerback for the Los Angeles Rams of the National Football League (NFL). He played college football for the Mississippi State Bulldogs and holds the FBS record for most career interceptions returned for a touchdown with six. Forbes was selected 16th overall by the Washington Commanders in the first round of the 2023 NFL draft, playing sparingly prior to being released midway through his second season.

== Early life ==
Forbes was born on January 13, 2001, in Grenada, Mississippi. He grew up playing football in youth leagues, often as a quarterback, before attending Grenada High School, where he played football, basketball, and baseball. In football, he recorded 49 tackles with eight interceptions as a cornerback, two of which were returned for touchdowns. Forbes also caught 31 passes for 499 yards and seven touchdowns as a wide receiver, and returned a punt and blocked field goal for touchdowns on special teams.

Forbes was considered the second-best prospect in Mississippi's 2020 recruiting class. In December 2019, he signed a National Letter of Intent to play college football for the Bulldogs at Mississippi State University. He had also received several JUCO offers to play college baseball.

== College career ==
Forbes was included on the Southeastern Conference All-Freshman team after recording 45 tackles and five interceptions, three of which were returned for a touchdown. He started every game as a sophomore in 2021, recording 59 tackles and three interceptions. He was a consensus All-American as a junior after recording six interceptions with three returned for touchdowns.

Considered a ballhawk, Forbes holds the NCAA Division I Football Bowl Subdivision (FBS) record for most career interceptions returned for a touchdown with six and is fourth in Mississippi State history with 14 interceptions. He also holds school records for the longest interception return at 90 yards, doing so at the 2020 Armed Forces Bowl, and the most interception yards in a season with 183, doing so as a freshman.

== Professional career ==
Pre-draft measurables
Height	Weight	Arm length	Hand span	Wingspan	40-yard dash	10-yard split	20-yard split	Vertical jump	Broad jump
6 ft 0 3/4 in (1.85 m)	166 lb (75 kg)	32 1/4 in (0.82 m)	8 1/2 in (0.22 m)	6 ft 7 in (2.01 m)	4.35 s	1.48 s	2.53 s	38.0 in (0.97 m)	10 ft 11 in (3.33 m)
All values from NFL Combine/Pro Day

=== Washington Commanders ===
Forbes was selected by the Washington Commanders in the first round (16th overall) of the 2023 NFL draft. His slim weight is a common point of discussion, with him being the only cornerback drafted since 2000 to weigh under 170 pounds at the NFL Combine. He signed a fully guaranteed four-year $15.4 million contract on July 22, 2023.

Forbes recorded his first career interception in his second game, a 35–33 win over the Denver Broncos. In the week 4 loss against the Philadelphia Eagles, he was criticized for his performance covering wide receiver A. J. Brown. The following week, he was benched after multiple blown coverages against Chicago Bears wide receiver D. J. Moore. In the first quarter of the week 10 game, Forbes was ejected after a helmet-to-helmet hit against Seattle Seahawks wide receiver Tyler Lockett. The NFL fined him for $15,563 for his week 10 ejection.

Following the opening game of the 2024 season, Forbes underwent surgery to repair a torn ulnar collateral ligament (UCL) in his right thumb. In the week 6 win over the Carolina Panthers, he recorded his second career interception against quarterback Andy Dalton. Forbes was waived by the team on November 30, 2024.

=== Los Angeles Rams ===
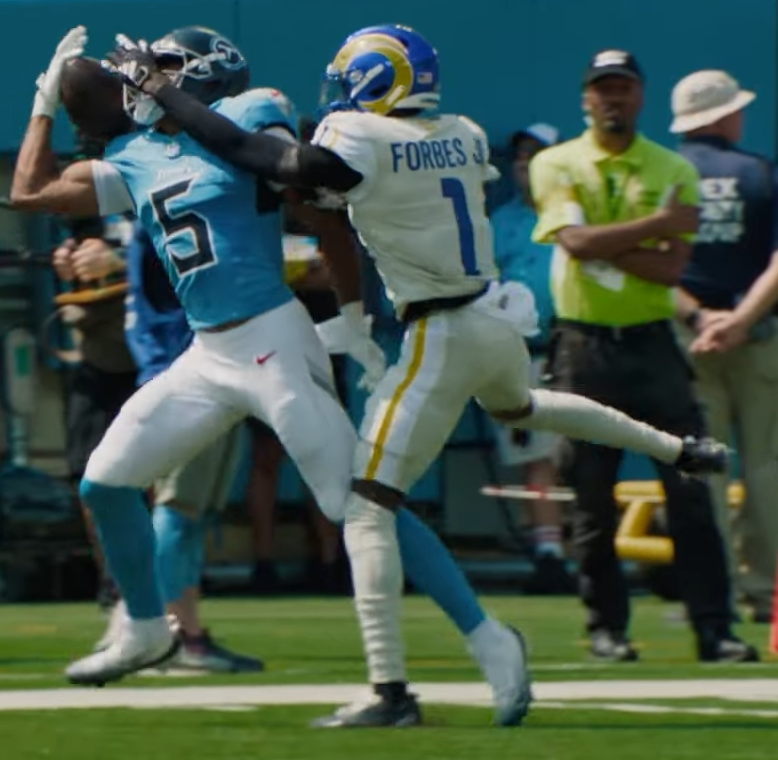
Forbes (#1) playing for the Los Angeles Rams in 2025

On December 2, 2024, Forbes was claimed off waivers by the Los Angeles Rams.

On May 1, 2026, the Rams declined the fifth-year option on Forbes' contract, making him a free agent after the 2026 season.

== Career statistics ==
=== NFL ===
Legend
**Bold**	Career high

==== Regular season ====
Year	Team	Games		Tackles					Interceptions						Fumbles		
Year	Team	GP	GS	Cmb	Solo	Ast	Sck	TFL	PD	Int	Yds	Avg	Lng	TD	FF	Fum	FR
2023	WAS	14	6	38	**35**	3	—	**2**	11	1	3	3.0	3	—	—	**1**	—
2024	WAS	6	1	7	2	5	—	—	1	1	19	**19.0**	19	—	—	—	—
2024	LAR	2	1	5	4	1	—	—	1	—	—	—	—	—	—	—	—
2025	LAR	17	14	**45**	32	**13**	—	—	**18**	**3**	**43**	14.3	**31**	—	**1**	—	—
Career		39	22	95	73	22	—	2	31	5	65	13.0	31	—	1	1	—

==== Postseason ====
Year	Team	Games		Tackles					Interceptions						Fumbles		
Year	Team	GP	GS	Cmb	Solo	Ast	Sck	TFL	PD	Int	Yds	Avg	Lng	TD	FF	Fum	FR
2025	LAR	3	1	8	5	3	—	1	—	—	—	—	—	—	—	—	—
Career		3	1	8	5	3	—	1	—	—	—	—	—	—	—	—	—

=== College ===
College statistics
Season	Games	Tackles	Solo	Ast	TFL	Sacks	Int	FF	FR	TD	PD
2020	10	45	23	22	0.5	0	5	0	0	3	6
2021	13	59	45	14	5	1	3	0	0	0	4
2022	12	46	26	20	1	0	6	0	0	3	10
Career	35	150	94	56	6.5	1	14	0	0	6	20

== Personal life ==
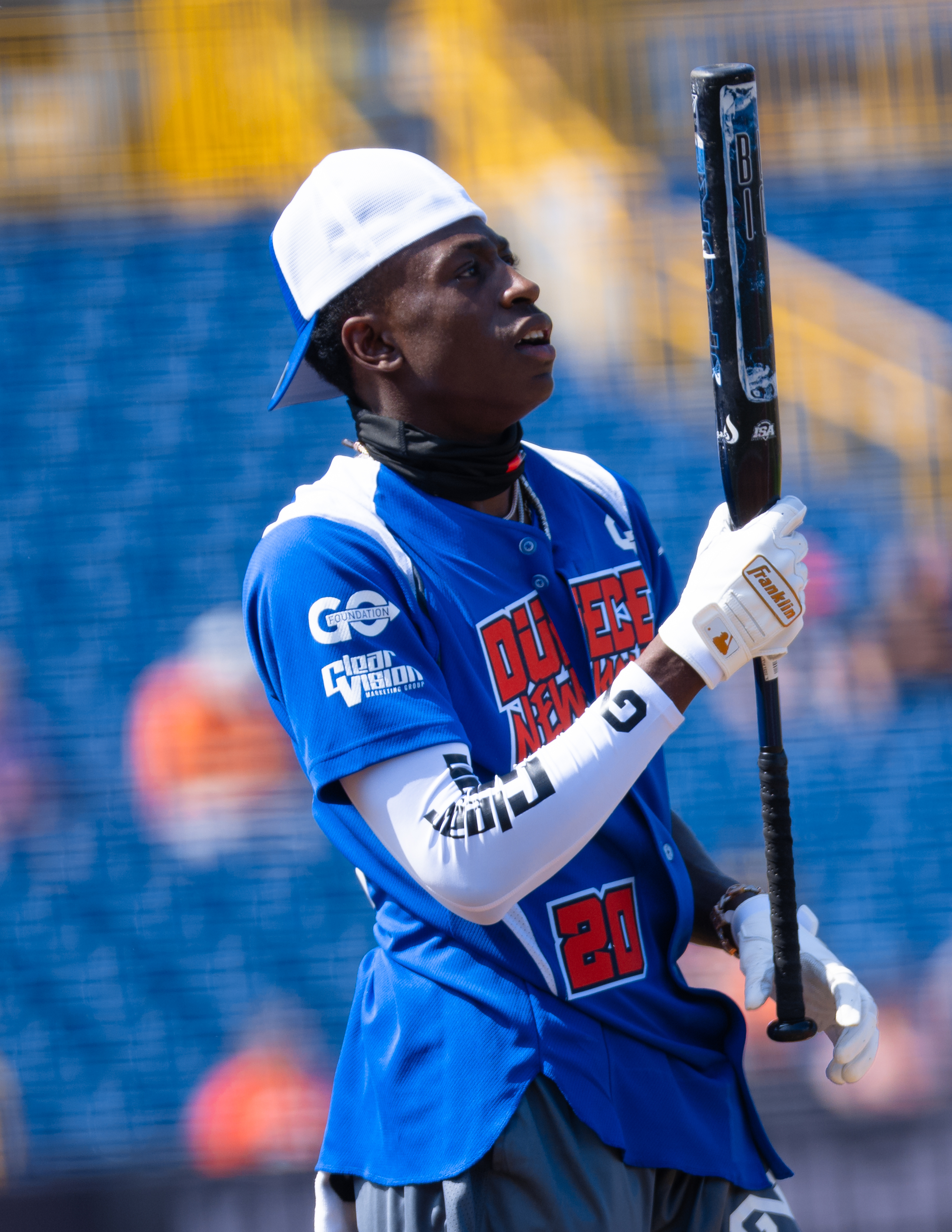
Forbes at a celebrity softball game in 2023

Forbes is the second-youngest of three siblings. He wears several necklaces for good luck, most featuring the Christian cross, while playing sports and performing daily activities such as showering. His father gave him his first necklace after closing a win as a pitcher in a championship baseball game. Forbes participated in a celebrity softball game at Classic Park in June 2023.
