= E. L. Boteler =

American politician

Member of the Mississippi House of Representatives from the unknown district
- In office 1956-1972

Personal details
- Born: February 6, 1920 Grenada, Mississippi, U.S.
- Died: March 7, 2016 (aged 96) Leland, Mississippi, U.S.

Edgar Lee Boteler, Jr. (February 6, 1920 – March 17, 2016) was an American farmer and politician.

Born in Grenada, Mississippi, Boteler was a farmer at Riverdale Farms. Boteler served in the Mississippi House of Representatives from 1956 to 1972. He was then appointed director of the Mississippi Department of Transportation. Boteler was convicted of embezzling public money. In 1980, he was paroled from prison and, in 1983, his civil rights were restored. Boteler died at his home in Leland, Mississippi.
