= Pete Boone =

American college athletics director

Pete Boone is an American college athletics director. He is the former athletic director for the University of Mississippi (Ole Miss).

== University of Mississippi ==
Boone is a 1972 graduate of the University of Mississippi and a native of Grenada, Mississippi. Boone served as Ole Miss AD from 2002 to 2012, his second stint as AD having served previously from 1995 to 1998 before stepping down from his position as athletics director to help start The Business Bank of Baton Rouge. During his tenure tremendous strides have been made in the improvement of athletic facilities. Under Boone as director of athletics, Ole Miss had experienced continued growth from adding sports to his overseeing in excess of $140 million in athletics improvements.

Boone also represented Ole Miss and the Southeastern Conference on a number of regional and NCAA committees. In August 2008, Boone was elected chairman of the SEC Athletics Directors Committee.

Under Boone, Ole Miss football went 80-80 overall and 38-68 in SEC play. During his tenure, Ole Miss teams claimed 20 SEC Western Divisional titles and 7 overall SEC championships. In 2010, Ole Miss men's athletics finished 1st among the Western division teams and 2nd overall in the annual SEC All-Sports standings.

On November 7, 2011, Boone announced he would retire from his AD position by December 2012. He retired on June 30.

== Banking ==
Boone is the former CEO and President of the $2.8 billion Sunburst Bank which was acquired by Union Planters Bank in 1994. Between 1998 and 2002, he was instrumental in starting The Business Bank of Baton Rouge, which was acquired by BancorpSouth in 2003.
