= Beginning of Things =

Studio album by Charlie Worsham
- Released: April 21, 2017
- Genre: Country
- Label: Warner Bros. Nashville
- Producer: Frank Liddell; Eric Masse

Charlie Worsham chronology
Rubberband (2013)	Beginning of Things (2017)	Sugarcane (2021)

Beginning of Things is the second album from American country music singer Charlie Worsham. It was released on April 21, 2017, via Warner Bros. Records Nashville.

== Critical reception ==
Stephen Thomas Erlewine of AllMusic rated the album 4 out of 5 stars, praising Worsham's "way with a joke" and "keen eye for detail and storytelling". Matt Bjorke of Roughstock was favorable, praising the varied song styles and lyrics.

== Track listing ==
No.	Title	Writer(s)	Length
1.	"Pants"	Jeff Hyde	0:14
2.	"Please People Please"	Worsham, Ryan Tyndell	3:57
3.	"Southern by the Grace of God"	Worsham, Luke Dick, Shane McAnally	4:33
4.	"Call You Up"	Abe Stoklasa, Daniel Tashian	3:30
5.	"Lawn Chair Don't Care"	Worsham, Tyndell, Brent Cobb	2:46
6.	"Only Way to Fly"	Worsham, Tyndell, Cobb	3:57
7.	"Old Time's Sake"	Worsham, Cobb, Jeremy Spillman	3:22
8.	"Cut Your Groove"	Worsham, Oscar Charles	4:11
9.	"I Ain't Goin' Nowhere"	Worsham, Tyndell, Billy Montana	4:21
10.	"The Beginning of Things"	Stoklasa, Donovan Woods	4:17
11.	"Birthday Suit"	Dick, Jason Lehning	3:19
12.	"I-55"	Worsham, Ben Hayslip	3:37
13.	"Take Me Drunk"	Worsham, Tyndell, Steve Bogard	2:47
