= Tyre Phillips =

American football player (born 1997)

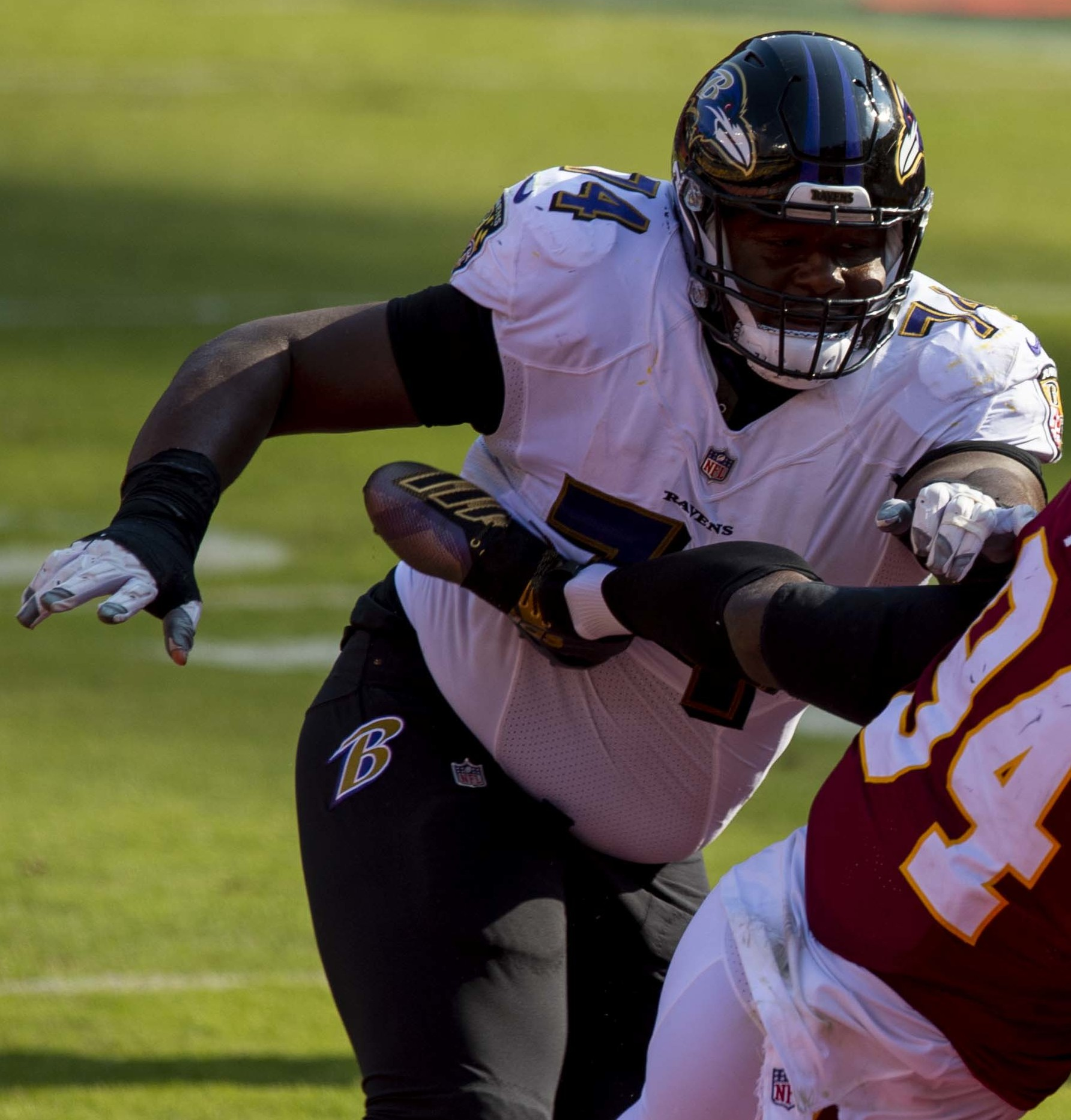
- Phillips with the Baltimore Ravens in 2020

Profile
- Position: Offensive tackle

Personal information
- Born: January 29, 1997 (age 29); Grenada, Mississippi, U.S.
- Listed height: 6 ft 5 in (1.96 m)
- Listed weight: 330 lb (150 kg)

Career information
- High school: Grenada
- College: East Mississippi CC (2015–2016); Mississippi State (2017–2019)
- NFL draft: 2020: 3rd round, 106th overall pick

Career history
- Baltimore Ravens (2020–2021); New York Giants (2022); Philadelphia Eagles (2023); New York Giants (2023–2024); Washington Commanders (2025)*; Cleveland Browns (2025)*
- * Offseason or practice squad member only

Career NFL statistics as of 2025
- Games played: 47
- Games started: 28
- Stats at Pro Football Reference

Tyre Jerel Phillips (born January 29, 1997) is an American professional football offensive tackle. He played college football for the Mississippi State Bulldogs and was selected by the Baltimore Ravens in the third round of the 2020 NFL draft. Phillips has also played for the New York Giants, Philadelphia Eagles, and Washington Commanders.

== Early life ==
Playing at Grenada High School in Grenada, Mississippi, Phillips played football his freshman season before focusing on basketball and marching band. At the behest of a number of people, Phillips returned to the gridiron late in his junior year. He had some scholarship offers from NCAA Division I Football Championship schools, but chose to go to East Mississippi Community College with the eventual goal of being a Division I recruit.

== College career ==
At East Mississippi Community College, Phillips played two seasons with the Lions. He committed to Mississippi State in between his two seasons at EMCC, and enrolled at Mississippi State in January 2017.

Phillips redshirted his first year at Mississippi State, a circumstance he later called "the best thing I ever could have done." He then played at both tackles positions as part of an offensive line rotation during his junior year. During his senior season, Phillips started all 13 games the Bulldogs played in. After the season, Phillips played in the 2020 Senior Bowl.

== Professional career ==
Pre-draft measurables
Height	Weight	Arm length	Hand span	Wingspan	40-yard dash	10-yard split	20-yard split	20-yard shuttle	Three-cone drill	Vertical jump	Broad jump	Bench press
6 ft 5 in (1.96 m)	331 lb (150 kg)	35 1/8 in (0.89 m)	10 3/8 in (0.26 m)	7 ft 0 5/8 in (2.15 m)	5.37 s	1.84 s	3.09 s	5.11 s	8.17 s	25.0 in (0.64 m)	7 ft 9 in (2.36 m)	22 reps
All values from NFL Combine

=== Baltimore Ravens ===
Phillips was selected by the Baltimore Ravens in the third round with the 106th overall pick of the 2020 NFL draft. During training camp, he shifted from tackle to offensive guard and beat out D. J. Fluker for the starting job at the start of the season despite dealing with an ankle injury. He was placed on injured reserve on November 3, 2020, with an ankle injury, and activated on November 30. On December 21, in Week 15 against the Jacksonville Jaguars, Phillips picked up a fumbled ball and ran with it for 22 yards.

On September 13, 2021, Phillips was carted off the field with a knee injury in the first half of the season-opener against the Las Vegas Raiders. It was revealed he suffered a torn ACL and was placed on injured reserve the following day. On October 16, Phillips was activated from injured reserve. On December 30, Phillips was again placed on injured reserve, putting an end to his sophomore season.

On August 31, 2022, Phillips was released by the Ravens.

=== New York Giants (first stint) ===
On September 1, 2022, Phillips was signed by the New York Giants. He was released on August 29, 2023 and re-signed to the practice squad. On August 31, Phillips was released by the Giants.

=== Philadelphia Eagles ===
On September 4, 2023, Phillips was signed to the Philadelphia Eagles' practice squad.

=== New York Giants (second stint) ===
On October 17, 2023, Phillips was signed by the New York Giants off of the Eagles' practice squad. He was thrust into the starting lineup in Week 7 at right tackle in place of the injured Evan Neal, and started nine of the next ten games.

On November 19, 2024, Phillips was signed to the Giants' practice squad.

=== Washington Commanders ===
Phillips signed with the Washington Commanders on May 11, 2025. He was released by the Commanders on August 25.

=== Cleveland Browns ===
On September 16, 2025, Phillips signed with the Cleveland Browns' practice squad. He signed a reserve/future contract with Cleveland on January 5, 2026.

On August 28, 2026, Phillips was released by the Browns as a part of final roster cuts.
