= Genard Avery =

American football player (born 1995)

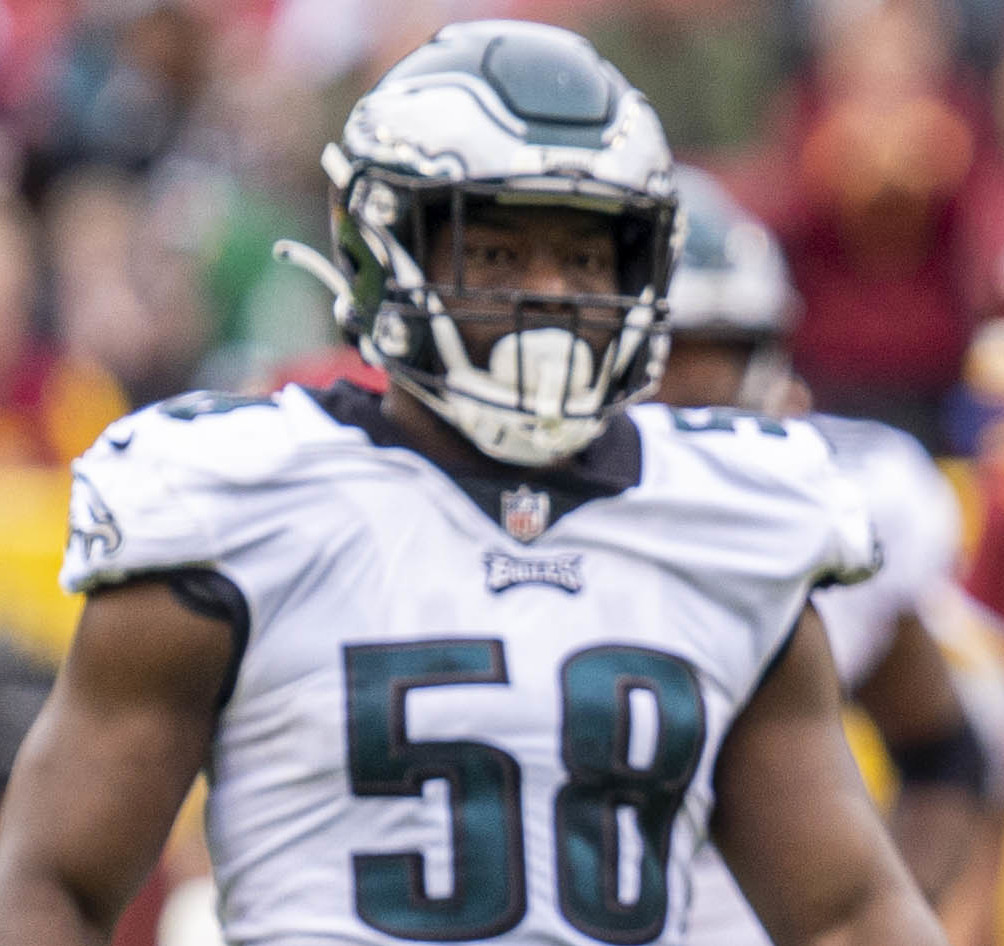
- Avery with the Philadelphia Eagles in 2021

No. 55, 58, 59, 92
- Position: Defensive end

Personal information
- Born: April 26, 1995 (age 31); Grenada, Mississippi, U.S.
- Listed height: 6 ft 0 in (1.83 m)
- Listed weight: 250 lb (113 kg)

Career information
- High school: Grenada (MS)
- College: Memphis (2014–2017)
- NFL draft: 2018: 5th round, 150th overall pick

Career history
- Cleveland Browns (2018–2019); Philadelphia Eagles (2019–2021); Pittsburgh Steelers (2022)*; Tampa Bay Buccaneers (2022); Indianapolis Colts (2023–2024)
- * Offseason or practice squad member only

Awards and highlights
- 2× First-team All-AAC (2016, 2017)

Career NFL statistics as of 2023
- Total tackles: 106
- Sacks: 8.5
- Forced fumbles: 1
- Fumble recoveries: 1
- Pass deflections: 5
- Stats at Pro Football Reference

Genard Avery (born April 26, 1995) is an American former professional football defensive end. After playing college football for the Memphis Tigers, he was selected by the Cleveland Browns in the fifth round of the 2018 NFL draft.

== Early life ==
Avery attended Grenada High School, where he was named to the Clarion-Ledger 2013 All-State Team and was the Most Valuable Player of Mississippi 6A Region. He played in the Mississippi-Alabama All-Star Game, and was a member of The Clarion-Ledger's Targeted 22. He registered 111 tackles and six sacks and forced five fumbles as a junior to earn Class 6A All-State honors.

As a senior, Avery tallied 75 total tackles, 3.5 sacks and two forced fumbles. He also saw playing time on offense, accounting for 72 rushing yards on 18 carries and five offensive touchdowns. During senior year, recorded a season-high 10 tackles (9 solo stops) in a 51–14 win over DeSoto Central.

Avery was also a Class 6A state champion powerlifter and four-year track and field letter-winner.

== College career ==
As a freshman at Memphis, Avery had five tackles. As a junior, he had 81 tackles including 11 for loss and two interceptions returned for touchdowns. Avery followed that up with 80 tackles including 22 tackles for loss.

Avery played in 50 career games with 34 starts, including every game of his final two seasons. His 45.5 career tackles for loss ranks second in the Memphis record book behind Tim Harris (49). His 21.5 sacks ranks third in program history behind Martin Ifedi (22.5) and Tramont Lawless (22). His 22.0 tackles for loss as a senior is a new Memphis single season record.

Avery had 232 career tackles, which is fifth all-time at Memphis, adding four forced fumbles, one fumble recovery, seven passes defended and two interceptions, both returned for touchdowns in 2016.

He graduated from the University of Memphis in December 2017, completing his degree in Organizational Leadership in 3 1/2 years.

== Professional career ==
Pre-draft measurables
Height	Weight	Arm length	Hand span	40-yard dash	10-yard split	20-yard split	20-yard shuttle	Three-cone drill	Vertical jump	Broad jump	Bench press
6 ft 0 1/2 in (1.84 m)	248 lb (112 kg)	31 in (0.79 m)	10 1/8 in (0.26 m)	4.59 s	1.59 s	2.67 s	4.36 s	6.90 s	36.0 in (0.91 m)	10 ft 4 in (3.15 m)	26 reps
All values from NFL Combine

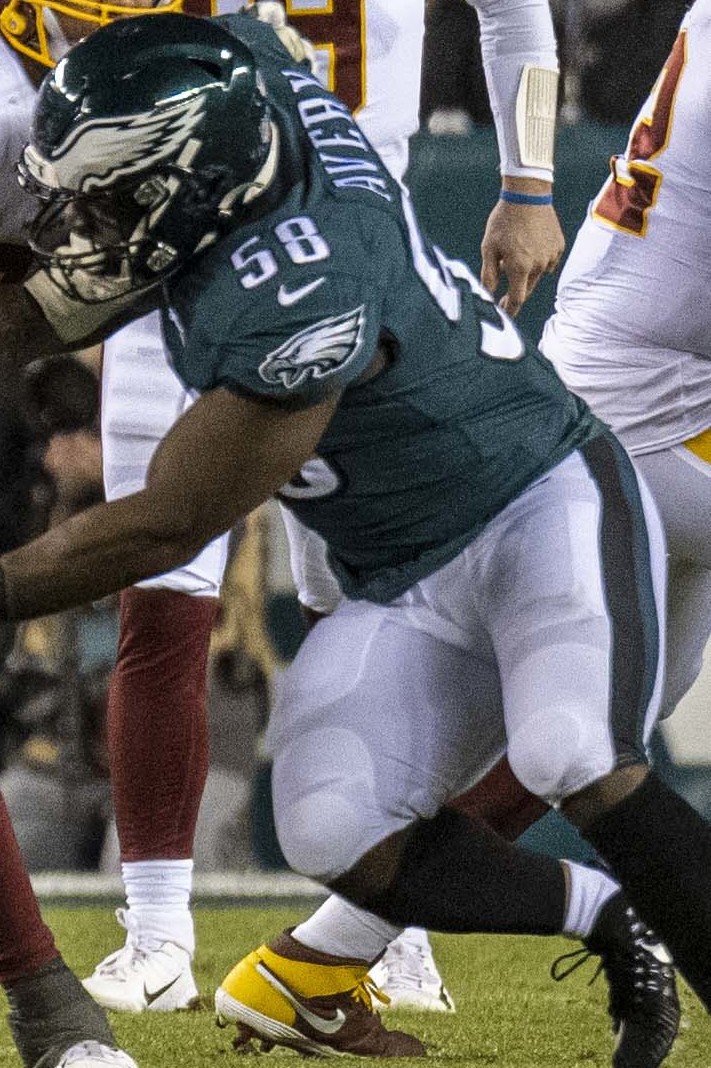
Avery with the Eagles in 2021

=== Cleveland Browns ===
Avery was selected by the Cleveland Browns in the fifth round (150th overall) of the 2018 NFL draft.

On May 13, 2018, Avery signed a rookie contract worth just under $2.7 million. It includes a signing bonus worth $280,000. In the season opener against the Pittsburgh Steelers, Avery recorded one strip sack and four total tackles in his NFL debut. He finished his rookie season with 40 tackles and 4.5 sacks after playing in every game, while starting in 5 of them.

During his second year, Avery fell into disfavor under the new defensive scheme of Steve Wilks and through the first 7 games of the season, he was only active during two games and was on the field for only 5 snaps.

=== Philadelphia Eagles ===
On October 28, 2019, one day before the trade deadline, Avery was traded to the Philadelphia Eagles for a fourth-round pick in the 2021 NFL draft.

In week 9, during his debut game with the Eagles, Avery recorded two tackles and half of a sack during the 22–14 win against the Chicago Bears. Avery remained active for the last 7 games, but he didn't record any more statistics for the rest of the season. He was inactive for the Eagles' wild card game against the Seattle Seahawks.

In week 4 of the 2020 season, Avery recorded 5 quarterback hits and a sack during the 25–20 win against the San Francisco 49ers. On October 30, 2020, Avery was placed on injured reserve with an elbow injury. He was activated on November 30, 2020. He finished his season with 12 tackles and 1.5 sacks.

Entering the 2021 season, Avery was given a more prominent role as a starting outside linebacker. During the week 5 game against the Carolina Panthers, Avery recorded 8 tackles in the 21–18 win; the most tackles he had ever recorded in a single game up to that point. On January 3, 2022, Avery was placed on the COVID list. He was activated one week later on January 10. He finished the season with 43 tackles and 1 sack, while playing in 16 games and starting 12 of them, missing just one game where the Eagles did not play their starters.

=== Pittsburgh Steelers ===
On March 28, 2022, Avery signed a one-year deal with the Pittsburgh Steelers. He was released on August 23, 2022.

=== Tampa Bay Buccaneers ===
On August 25, 2022, Avery was signed by the Tampa Bay Buccaneers. He was released on August 30, 2022, and signed to the practice squad the next day. He was promoted to the active roster on October 11. On December 23, Avery was placed on season–ending injured reserve with an abdomen injury he had suffered in Week 14.

=== Indianapolis Colts ===
On June 1, 2023, Avery signed with the Indianapolis Colts. He was placed on injured reserve on August 18, 2023. He re-signed with the team on March 13, 2024. He was released on August 27, and re-signed to the practice squad. Avery was signed to the active roster on September 17. He was waived on November 23.

== Personal life ==
Avery's cousin is C. J. Avery

== NFL career statistics ==
Year	Team	Games		Tackles				Interceptions					Fumbles		
Year	Team	GP	GS	Comb	Solo	Ast	Sck	Int	Yds	Avg	TD	PD	FF	FR	TD
2018	CLE	16	5	40	30	10	4.5	0	0	0.0	0	4	1	1	0
2019	CLE	2	0	1	1	0	0	0	0	0.0	0	0	0	0	0
2019	PHI	8	0	5	2	3	0.5	0	0	0.0	0	0	0	0	0
2020	PHI	11	0	12	6	6	1.5	0	0	0.0	0	1	0	0	0
2021	PHI	16	12	43	21	22	1.0	0	0	0.0	0	0	0	0	0
Career		53	17	101	60	41	7.5	0	0	0	0	5	1	1	0
Source: NFL.com
