= Grenada High School =

Location
- 1875 Fairgrounds Road; Grenada, Mississippi 38901; United States; 33.7624°N 89.8056°W

Information
- Type: Public secondary
- School district: Grenada School District
- Principal: Emily Tindall
- Teaching staff: 67.23 (FTE)
- Grades: 9–12
- Enrollment: 1,048 (2023–2024)
  - Grade 9: 295
  - Grade 10: 272
  - Grade 11: 220
  - Grade 12: 243
- Student to teacher ratio: 15.59
- Colors: Red and Blue
- Athletics conference: MSHSAA 6A Region 1
- Nickname: Chargers
- Website: ghs.grenadak12.com

Grenada High School is a public high school located in Grenada, Mississippi, United States. It educates students in grades 9 through 12 and is the only high school in the Grenada School District.

== History ==
The first public high school in Grenada was founded in the fall of 1885.

In May 1962, alumnus Erle Johnston gave the commencement speech titled "The Practical Way to Maintain a Separate School System in Mississippi" in which he criticized the "extremism" of the NAACP and Citizens Councils. After strong resistance, vicious attacks, and intimidation, the school was integrated in 1966.

In 2022 the school had a roughly equal number of African American and white students. 67 percent of the school's students were categorized as economically disadvantaged.

== Athletics ==
Grenada's athletic teams are the Chargers and compete in Mississippi High School Athletics Association 5A Region 1.

State Championships
Sport	Years
Boys basketball	1985
Girls track and field	1985, 1986, 1987
Slow-pitch softball	2009
Powerlifting	1997

== Performing arts ==
The Grenada marching band program won 39 championships in the last decades of the 1900s; it also made appearances in the Macy's Thanksgiving Day Parade in 1995 and 2001 and the Tournament of Roses Parade in 1998. The band won the 1997 National High School Band of the Year award.

GHS also has a competitive show choir, "Visions".

== Other activities ==
The school has an ROTC chapter.

== Notable alumni ==
- Genard Avery, football player
- Emmanuel Forbes, football player
- Tyre Phillips, football player
- Greg Robinson, football player
- J. J. Russell, football player
- Trumaine Sykes, football player
- Charlie Worsham, musician
