= James T. Laney =

American diplomat and academic administrator (1927–2026)

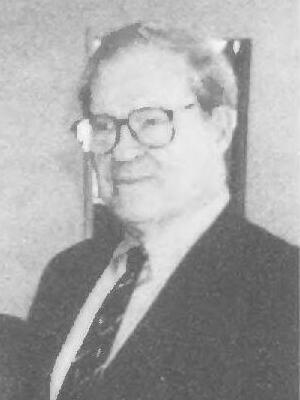

United States Ambassador to South Korea
- In office November 2, 1993 – February 5, 1996
- President: Bill Clinton
- Preceded by: Donald Gregg
- Succeeded by: Stephen W. Bosworth

17th President of Emory University
- In office 1977–1993
- Preceded by: Sanford Soverhill Atwood
- Succeeded by: William Chace

Personal details
- Born: James Thomas Laney; December 24, 1927 Wilson, Arkansas, U.S.
- Died: August 13, 2026 (aged 98)
- Education: Yale University (BA, PhD)
- Occupation: Minister; professor; diplomat

James Thomas Laney (December 24, 1927 – August 13, 2026) was an American minister, academic and diplomat. He served as dean of the Candler School of Theology, president of Emory University, and United States Ambassador to South Korea.

== Early life and education ==
Laney was born in Wilson, Arkansas in the American South and grew up in Arkansas and Memphis, Tennessee. After graduating from Central High School in Memphis, he earned his B.A. degree in economics at Yale University. His studies were interrupted by service in the United States Army in the late 1940s, when he went to Korea, in January 1947, after World War II and the removal of Japanese rule. He served in the Counterintelligence Corps. According to a biography posted on the Emory University website, "He would say later in life that the experience in Korea so changed his thinking about the world, that by the time he returned to Yale to finish his degree, in 1950, he had determined to enter the ministry." Laney then earned a degree from Yale Divinity School in 1954. He later returned to Yale, completing a Ph.D. degree in Christian ethics at Yale Graduate School in 1966.

== Career ==
Laney was ordained as a Methodist minister and served as chaplain at Choate School (now Choate Rosemary Hall) while completing his seminary degree. He served as a church minister in Cincinnati, Ohio, for three years, from 1955 to 1958. He then returned to Yale with his wife, Berta Radford Laney, for Korean language study in preparation for entering the mission field. "In 1959, drawn by what he had seen in Korea, Laney returned [there] ... to serve as a Methodist missionary teaching at Yonsei University" in Seoul. In 1964, seeing higher education as another facet of his vocation, he entered Yale Graduate School, where he completed his Ph.D. degree in Christian ethics in just two years. In 1969, only three years after becoming an assistant professor at Vanderbilt Divinity School, Laney was called by Emory University to be dean of the Candler School of Theology from 1969 to 1977.

He served as the 17th president of Emory University from 1977 to 1993. In 1979, two years after he became the university's president, Emory received an identity-changing $105 million gift from Robert W. Woodruff, the former Coca-Cola Company chairman, and his brother George W. Woodruff. At the time, this was the largest philanthropic gift in U.S. history. Boosted by these resources, and guided by Laney's strategic vision, Emory transformed itself by hiring preeminent faculty, recruiting some of the best students, and raising its academic standing.

Laney was appointed Ambassador to South Korea by United States President Bill Clinton on October 15, 1993, and presented credentials November 2, 1993. He was involved in defusing the 1994 nuclear crisis during his tenure. He served in the administration of Clinton until the end of Clinton’s first term, on January 20, 1997.

== Other involvements ==
In 1974, Laney was a visiting professor at Harvard Divinity School. He later chaired the Harvard Board of Overseers committee for Harvard Divinity School and has served on the Executive Committee of the Yale University Council. He served as a trustee of the Henry Luce Foundation in New York; he was the co-chair, with Andrew Young, of Faith and the City in Atlanta; and he was a board member of the Community Foundation for Greater Atlanta. He is a past director of The Coca-Cola Company and SunTrust Georgia. From 1997 to 2003, he co-chaired the Council on Foreign Relations Task Force on Korea. He served as the chair of the United Board for Christian Higher Education in Asia. His articles have appeared in Foreign Affairs, The New York Times, The Washington Post, and numerous other publications.

As president of Emory University, Laney offered former President Jimmy Carter to assume the role of distinguished professor on the condition that Carter would have an opportunity to lecture all of the schools of the university each year and that Carter's comments would never be restricted or censored in any way. Carter accepted his offer in April 1982 and worked with Emory University to establish what would become The Carter Center associated with the university.

== Personal life and death ==
Laney was married to Berta Radford Laney, whom he met when they were in high school. She was the niece of Admiral Arthur Radford, who was appointed by President Dwight D. Eisenhower as the second chairman of the Joint Chiefs of Staff. Jim and Berta Laney had five children, the two youngest of whom were born in Seoul, Korea, when the family lived there from 1959 to 1964, during Laney's missionary work. Three of the five children graduated from Emory College, and two received advanced degrees. Laney and his wife had sixteen grandchildren, ten of whom have attended one or more schools at Emory University. Laney's maternal aunt was literary scholar Ruth Hughey.

Laney died on August 13, 2026, at the age of 98.

== Honors and awards ==
Laney received nearly two dozen honorary degrees from colleges and universities on four continents, including Yale University, Yonsei University in Korea, the University of St. Andrews in Scotland, Africa University, and Emory University. Yonsei University also created the James T. Laney Professorship in International Relations. He received the United States Department of Defense Medal for Distinguished Public Service, the Kangwa Medal for Distinguished Diplomatic Service from the Republic of Korea, the Kellogg Award for Leadership in Higher Education, the Wilbur L. Cross Medal from Yale, the Emory Medal, the General James Van Fleet award from the Korea Society, and the World Methodist Peace Award. Emory University's graduate school, founded in 1919, was renamed The James T. Laney School of Graduate Studies in 2009. In 2014, the Candler School of Theology created the James T. and Berta Laney Program in Moral Leadership, which supports an endowed professorship in their name.

Diplomatic posts
Preceded by Donald Gregg	US Ambassador to Korea; 1993–1996	Succeeded by Stephen Warren Bosworth
