= Charlie Worsham =

American singer and songwriter

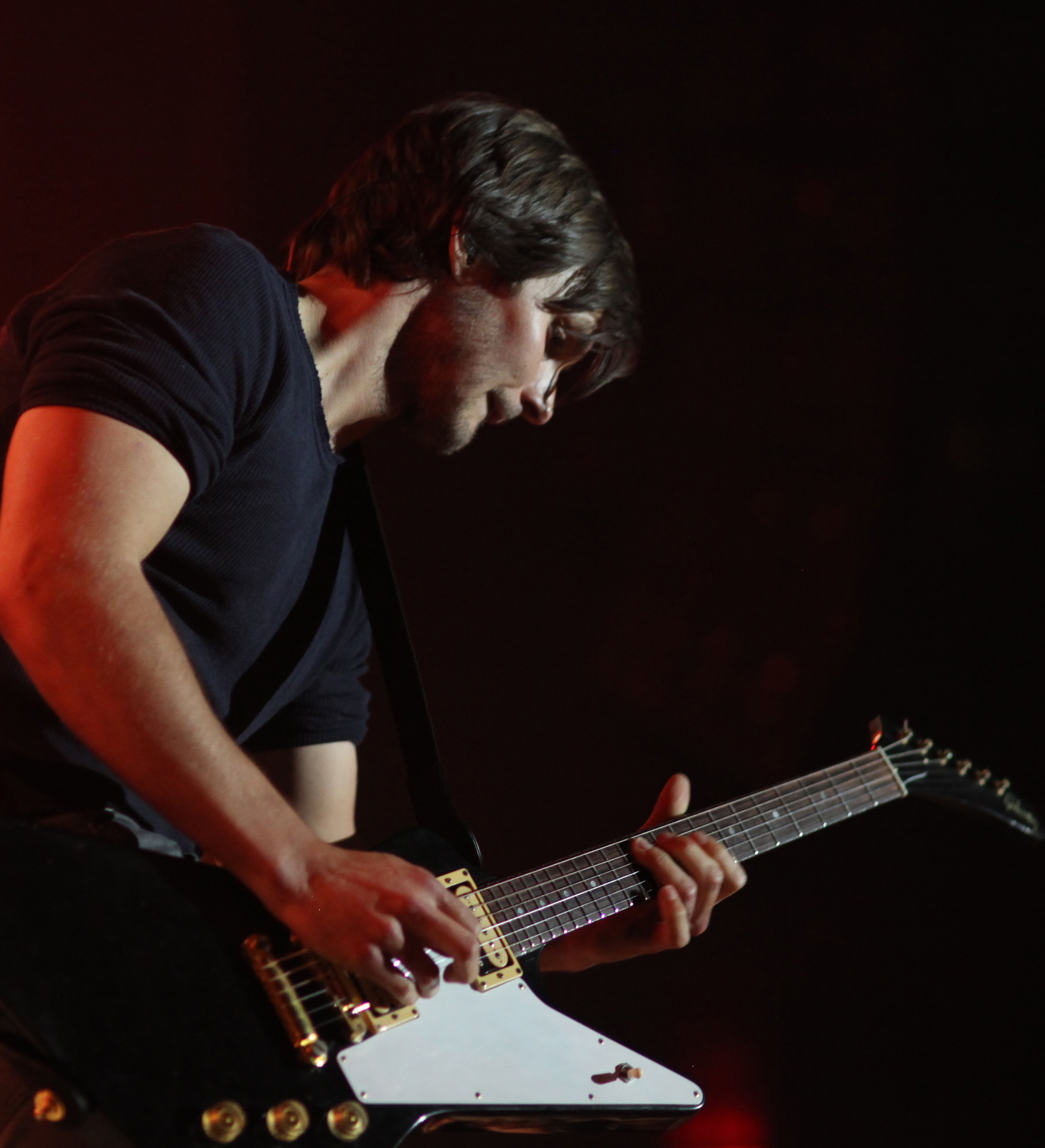

Background information
- Born: September 1, 1985 (age 41); Jackson, Mississippi
- Origin: Nashville, Tennessee
- Genres: Country
- Occupations: Singer-songwriter, actor
- Instruments: Vocals, guitar, banjo, mandolin
- Years active: 1990s-present
- Label: Warner Bros. Nashville
- Formerly of: KingBilly, Old Crow Medicine Show
- Website: charlieworsham.com

Charlie Worsham (born September 1, 1985) is an American country music singer, songwriter, musician, and actor. He is signed to Warner Bros. Records. Charlie is currently a member of Dierks Bentley's tour band. He is a former member of the band Old Crow Medicine Show. He earned one of country music's crowning achievements when he was invited to become a member of the Grand Ole Opry in 2026.

== Musical career ==
Worsham was born in Jackson, Mississippi, and grew up in Grenada, Mississippi. The Mississippi Senate recognized Worsham in 1999, when he was 14 years old, for his outstanding musical accomplishments, as well as being "a model student who makes straight A's". Worsham attended Grenada High School, and then Berklee College of Music in Boston.

Worsham joined the band KingBilly, singing harmonies and playing mandolin until 2010; the band recorded an extended play, "Waiting On You". Though the band received some local fame in Nashville and a featured spot on Great American Country’s GAC Minute, they never broke through to mainstream radio, and disbanded in 2012 with all members pursuing solo careers.

Worsham toured with Taylor Swift in 2011, and has opened for performers such as Miranda Lambert and Wade Bowen. He opened for Brad Paisley and Randy Houser in 2014. In 2016 it was announced he would be opening some shows during the final world tour of Kenny Rogers.

=== "Could It Be" (2013) ===
He released his debut single, "Could It Be", for Warner Bros. Records in 2013. The song appears on his debut album Rubberband, released on August 20, 2013. The album features Vince Gill and Marty Stuart on one of the tracks, "Tools of the Trade". The album's second single, "Want Me Too", was released in late 2013.

=== Beginning of Things (2017) ===
Worsham's second album, Beginning of Things, was released on April 21, 2017. "Cut Your Groove" was released as the album's lead single. Worsham did not release any new content until April 2021 when he issued a single titled "Fist Through This Town". This was followed by an EP titled Sugarcane in July of the same year.

In July 2026, Worsham signed with ONErpm for the release of his third studio album, Once Upon a Second Time Around. Scheduled for August 7, 2026, it was described as his first independently released album. On August 7, 2026, the twenty-year anniversary of Worsham's move to Nashville and the release day of Once Upon a Second Time Around, Worsham was surprised by Vince Gill during Gill's show at the Ryman Auditorium where Worsham was playing as part of the band with an invite to become the next member of the Grand Ole Opry, which he accepted.

== TV appearances ==
In 2014, Worsham was cast as Colin Haynes (a country musician who was brutally murdered) in Bones' 9th season episode Big in the Philippines. The episode was directed by David Boreanaz.

== Podcasts ==
Charlie Worsham currently hosts the "Mississippi on the Map" podcast in partnership with Visit Mississippi. Guests have included Morgan Freeman, Marty Stuart, Mac McAnally and Chris Stapleton.

== Discography ==
=== Studio albums ===
Title	Details	Peak chart positions	
Title	Details	US Country	US
Rubberband	Release date: August 20, 2013; Label: Warner Bros.	12	64
Beginning of Things	Release date: April 21, 2017; Label: Warner Bros.	— (Note: The Beginning of Things did not chart on Top Country Albums, but peaked at No. 28 on the Country Album Sales chart.)	—
Once Upon a Second Time Around	Release date: August 7, 2026; Label: ONErpm	—	—

=== Extended plays ===
Title	Album details
Sugarcane	Release date: July 16, 2021; Label: Warner Music Nashville; Formats: Digital download
Compadres	Release date: October 13, 2023; Label: Warner Music Nashville; Formats: Digital download

=== Singles ===
Year	Single	Peak chart positions				Album
Year	Single	US Country	US Country Airplay	US	CAN Country	Album
2013	"Could It Be"	28	13	94	42	Rubberband
2013	"Want Me Too"	46	33	—	—	Rubberband
2017	"Cut Your Groove"	—	—	—	—	Beginning of Things
2021	"Fist Through This Town"	—	—	—	—	Sugarcane
"—" denotes releases that did not chart

=== Music videos ===
Year	Video	Director
2013	"Could It Be"	Kristin Barlowe
2017	"Cut Your Groove"	Sam Siske
2021	"Fist Through This Town"	Sam Siske

== Awards and nominations ==
Year	Organization	Award	Nominee/Work	Result	Ref
2023	Country Music Association Awards	Musician of the Year	Himself	Nominated	
2024	Country Music Association Awards	Musician of the Year	Himself	Won	
