= Grenada School District =

School district in Mississippi

The Grenada School District is a public school district based in Grenada, Mississippi (US). The district's boundaries parallel that of Grenada County.

== Schools ==
- Grenada High School (Grades 9-12)
- Grenada Middle School - Previously Grenada Junior High School (Grades 6-8)
- Grenada Elementary School — Green Top (Grades 3-5)
- Grenada Elementary School — Red Top (Grades PreK-2)
- Grenada Enrichment And Transition Center (alternative) (Grades 6-12)
- Grenada Technical And Career Center (Grades 9-12)
- Grenada Adult Education Center (Adult Literacy, Adult Basic Education, English-as-a-Second Language, GED Testing)

=== Other Facilities ===
- Grenada Band Hall (Grades 6-12)

==== African-American Schools ====
Before racial integration, GSD (GMSSD At The Time) operated a second set of schools for African-American students to attend. Those schools included:

- Rebecca Reed School
- Tie Plant School
- Willie Wilson Elementary School
- Carrie Dotson High School

== Renovations ==
• In 2023, they planned on renovating GES Green Top to add 3rd grade, due to the rising amount of kindergarteners at GES Red Top. They started In June 2023 and finished just in time for the 2024-2025 school year

• On January 21, 2025, after the successful construction of GES Green Top, the Superintendent announced that construction at GMS would start, they planned to renovate the Middle School. It is planned to be finished just in time for the 2026-2027 school year.

== Demographics ==
=== 2006-07 school year ===
There were a total of 4,753 students enrolled in the Grenada School District during the 2006–2007 school year. The gender makeup of the district was 50% female and 50% male. The racial makeup of the district was 50.94% African American, 48.33% White, 0.17% Hispanic, 0.36% Asian, and 0.21% Native American. 55.2% of the district's students were eligible to receive free lunch.

=== Previous school years ===
School Year	Enrollment	Gender Makeup		Racial Makeup				
School Year	Enrollment	Female	Male	Asian	African American	Hispanic	Native American	White
2005-06	4,765	50%	50%	0.34%	51.92%	0.25%	0.19%	47.30%
2004-05	4,685	51%	49%	0.19%	53.06%	0.13%	0.13%	46.49%
2003-04	4,715	50%	50%	0.19%	53.91%	0.08%	0.13%	45.68%
2002-03	4,646	50%	50%	0.13%	54.26%	0.28%	0.09%	45.24%

== Accountability statistics ==
	2006-07	2005-06	2004-05	2003-04	2002-03
District Accreditation Status	Accredited	Accredited	Accredited	Accredited	Accredited
School Performance Classifications
Level 5 (Superior Performing) Schools	0	2	1	0	0
Level 4 (Exemplary) Schools	2	2	1	2	0
Level 3 (Successful) Schools	2	0	2	2	4
Level 2 (Under Performing) Schools	0	0	0	0	0
Level 1 (Low Performing) Schools	0	0	0	0	0
Not Assigned	0	0	0	0	0

== See also ==
- List of school districts in Mississippi
