= Rubberband (Charlie Worsham album) =

Studio album by Charlie Worsham
- Released: August 20, 2013
- Genre: Country
- Label: Warner Bros. Nashville
- Producer: Charlie Worsham, Ryan Tyndell

Charlie Worsham chronology
Rubberband (2013)	Beginning of Things (2017)

Singles from Rubberband
- 1. "Could It Be" Released: January 14, 2013; 2. "Want Me Too" Released: December 9, 2013

Rubberband is the debut album by American country music artist Charlie Worsham. It was released on August 20, 2013 via Warner Bros. Records. Worsham co-wrote all eleven tracks and co-produced the album with Ryan Tyndell. Vince Gill and Marty Stuart appear on the song "Tools of the Trade".

== Critical reception ==
The album received positive reviews from critics. Billy Dukes of Taste of Country gave it 4.5 stars out of 5, saying that "From top to bottom, Worsham never shows the same style or tone twice in a row, making each cut feel original and exciting. " It received an "A" from Tammy Raugsa of Country Weekly, whose review compared the music to Diamond Rio and New Grass Revival, also praising the lyrics and Worsham's voice, which she compared to Vince Gill. She concluded her review with, "It seems unfair to isolate any one track over another since all stand on their own. They’re laudable as much for their unique nature as they are for their honest-to-goodness goodness." Jeffrey B. Remz of Country Standard Time compared Worsham to Keith Urban, but thought that the softer songs showed more of an original sound. He added that "It may not be particularly new, but it is very well done."

== Track listing ==
No.	Title	Writer(s)	Length
1.	"Could It Be"	Charlie Worsham, Ryan Tyndell, Marty Dodson	3:24
2.	"Want Me Too"	Worsham, Tyndell, Quinn Loggins	3:38
3.	"Young to See"	Worsham, Lee Thomas Miller, Chris DuBois	3:14
4.	"Trouble Is"	Worsham, Tyndell, Dodson	3:43
5.	"Rubberband"	Worsham, Tyndell, Kyle Jacobs, John Ozier	3:20
6.	"How I Learned to Pray"	Worsham, Tyndell, Jeremy Spillman	4:20
7.	"Tools of the Trade" (featuring Vince Gill and Marty Stuart)	Worsham, Tyndell, Jeff Hyde	4:05
8.	"Mississippi in July"	Worsham, Tyndell, Ben Ford	3:56
9.	"Break What's Broken"	Worsham, Josh Osborne, Shane McAnally	3:30
10.	"Someone like Me"	Worsham, Tyndell, McAnally	3:43
11.	"Love Don't Die Easy" (featuring Sheryl Crow)	Worsham, Tyndell, Steve Bogard	3:32

== Personnel ==
Compiled from liner notes.

Musicians

- Tom Bukovac – electric guitar, acoustic guitar on "Break What's Broken"
- Sheryl Crow – background vocals on "Love Don't Die Easy"
- Madi Diaz – background vocals
- Johnny Duke – electric guitar, acoustic guitar
- Shawn Fichter – drums and percussion on "Break What's Broken"
- Matt Glassmeyer – shuitar
- Vince Gill – resonator guitar and background vocals on "Tools of the Trade"
- Lee Hendricks – bass guitar
- Rebecca Lynn Howard – background vocals on "Tools of the Trade"
- Jedd Hughes – electric guitar, acoustic guitar, mandolin, guitalele
- Jeff Hyde – acoustic guitar
- Eric Masse – background vocals
- Matt Nolen – background vocals
- Adam Popick – bass guitar on "Break What's Broken"
- Marty Stuart – mandolin and background vocals on "Tools of the Trade"
- Ryan Tyndell – background vocals, percussion
- Charlie Worsham – lead vocals, background vocals, electric guitar, acoustic guitar, mandolin, banjo, guitalele, percussion
- Craig Wright – drums, percussion

Technical

- Arturo Buenahora, Jr. – executive production
- Eric Masse – recording
- Andrew Mendelson – mastering
- Justin Niebank – mixing
- Ryan Tyndell – production
- Brian David Willis – digital editing
- Charlie Worsham – production

== Chart performance ==
=== Album ===
Chart (2013)	Peak position
US Billboard 200	64
US Top Country Albums (Billboard)	12

=== Singles ===
Year	Single	Peak chart positions			
Year	Single	US Country	US Country Airplay	US	CAN Country
2013	"Could It Be"	28	13	94	42
2013	"Want Me Too"	46	33	—	—
"—" denotes releases that did not chart
