= Could It Be (Charlie Worsham song) =

Single by Charlie Worsham

from the album Rubberband
- Released: January 14, 2013
- Genre: Country
- Length: 3:24
- Label: Warner Bros. Nashville
- Songwriters: Charlie Worsham; Ryan Tyndell; Marty Dodson
- Producers: Charlie Worsham; Ryan Tyndell

Charlie Worsham singles chronology
"Could It Be" (2013)	"Want Me Too" (2013)

"Could It Be" is a song recorded by American country music artist Charlie Worsham. It was released in January 2013 as his debut single. It is included on his debut album, Rubberband, released on August 20, 2013 via Warner Bros. Records. The song was written by Worsham, Ryan Tyndell and Marty Dodson.

== Content ==
In the song, the male narrator wakes to find that he and a female friend, after drinking too much alcohol have slept together. The song continues on as the singer wonders if they will become a relationship, pondering "Could it be the end of "Just friends" And the start of something more", or if they should "write it off, as a sweet mistake".

== Critical reception ==
Billy Dukes of Taste of Country gave the song four stars out of five, comparing Worsham favorably to Keith Urban and Vince Gill. Dukes wrote that "While he doesn’t show the range Gill is known for on this song, his vocals are similarly smooth" and "after a few listens, lines like those in the pre-chorus begin to stand out." Bobby Peacock of Roughstock gave the song four and a half stars out of five, saying that "Worsham's easygoing charm sells the song, his range and phrasing recalling Marty Roe of Diamond Rio." Peacock also praised the song's "tight production," adding that "strong acoustic guitar riffs and tight percussion are the main focus here, never getting overly loud or overpowering his voice."

== Music video ==
The music video was directed by Kristin Barlowe and premiered in February 2013.

== Chart performance ==
"Could It Be" debuted at number 60 on the US Billboard Country Airplay chart for the week of January 26, 2013. It also debuted at number 48 on the U.S. Billboard Hot Country Songs chart for the week of May 4, 2013. It also debuted at number 97 on the U.S. Billboard Hot 100 chart for the week of September 28, 2013.

Chart (2013)	Peak position
Canada Country (Billboard)	42
US Billboard Hot 100	94
US Country Airplay (Billboard)	13
US Hot Country Songs (Billboard)	28

=== Year-end charts ===
Chart (2013)	Position
US Country Airplay (Billboard)	54
US Hot Country Songs (Billboard)	78
