= The Korea Society =

American non-profit organization

- Formation: 1957
- Type: 501(c)(3) organization
- Purpose: Improving South Korea–United States relations
- Headquarters: New York City, New York
- Website: koreasociety.org

The Korea Society is a non-partisan, 501(c)(3) nonprofit organization based in the United States that promotes understanding and cooperation between the United States and Korea. It was founded in 1957 and is currently based in New York City. It receives funding from endowments, donations, and grants.

The organization adopted its current name following an amalgamation of several groups in 1993 to form The Korea Society.

== History ==
=== Background ===
In 1953, near the end of the Korean War, US General James Van Fleet left Korea. He had been commander of all US ground forces, the Republic of Korea Army, and all ground forces of the UN between 1951 and 1953. During a 29 January 1953 speech on the steps of the Korean Capitol Building, Van Fleet said, "I shall come back. You have made me a part of you. I know you are a part of me. I shall not ask you to give me back my heart. I leave it with you."

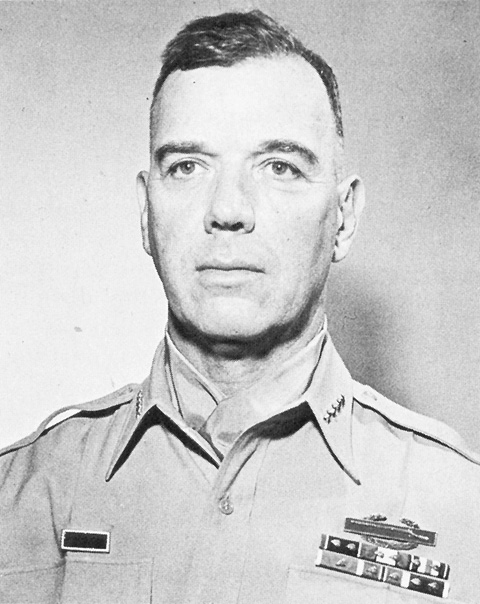
James Van Fleet in 1953

Upon his return to the US, Van Fleet commenced a campaign to raise funds to facilitate reconstruction efforts and aid support for the people of Korea. Following his position during the war, Van Fleet occupied the position of chairman to the American-Korean Foundation (AFK) in the 1950s. Van Fleet was successful in facilitating a fund drive aimed at humanitarian efforts for the Korean people in need of aid. This success led to other aspirations in using his relationships and position to further cooperation between the United States and the people of Korea. In this effort, he sought the input of leaders such as Arthur Hays Sulzberger of The New York Times, Henry Luce of Time-Life, Spyros P. Skouras of 20th Century Fox, William Randolph Jr. Van Fleet also sought the involvement of William Zeckendorf, a real estate developer, Juilliard President, William Schuman, and Ben C. Lim, the first Korean Ambassador to the UN.

=== Foundation ===
On 20 November 1957, Van Fleet was one of the five signers of the certificate of incorporation for the Korea Society. On the certificate, the stated purpose of the organization was:

To further and continue the friendly relationship that has long existed between the American people and the people of Korea through mutual understanding and appreciation of their respective cultures, aims, ideals, arts, sciences and industries, to the end that their peoples may, through an ever closer cooperation, continue their contribution to the improvement of mankind.

— Certificate of Incorporation of Korea Society, Inc., photocopy of original document in VFPF, Van Fleet Foundation, Hobe sound, FL, p.1.

The Korea Society set up its first operation center at 420 Lexington Avenue. The organization received its first acknowledgment from President Eisenhower through a government endorsement. The Society granted awards to various figures, including Ban Ki-moon, Jimmy Carter, Chey Tae-won, Park Yong-man, Colin Powell, Chung Mong Koo, Lee Kun-hee, George W. Bush, and Kim Dae-jung.
