= Grenada College =

Academic institution In Mississippi

- Main building, Grenada College
- Former names: Yalobusha Female Institute, Emma Mercer Institute, Grenada Female College
- Active: November 30, 1850–1936
- Religious affiliation: Baptist, Methodist
- Location: Grenada, Mississippi, United States

Grenada College was a college for women, founded by Baptists, in Grenada, Mississippi in 1850.

It opened as Yalobusha Female Institute in 1851 and was also known as the Emma Mercer Institute and the Grenada Female College.

== Yalobusha Female Institute ==
The college was established on November 30, 1850 by an act of the Mississippi state legislature and was named the Yalobusha Female Institute. Its first president was Dr. W. S. Webb, who served until 1857.

Yalobusha was intended by Mississippi legislators to become the preeminent women's institution in the South and to draw students from throughout the region. It was given a budget that funded such amenities as the largest telescope in its surrounding states and a dormitory for 150 students.

Enrollment began in 1851, with 77 students of various Christian denominations attending Yalobusha from September through the end of June 1852. Classes were held in the Union Hotel in Grenada, and also in the College Inn at 123 S. College Street. The college subsequently raised enough money for a building, which was completed by 1858.

== Emma Mercer Institute ==
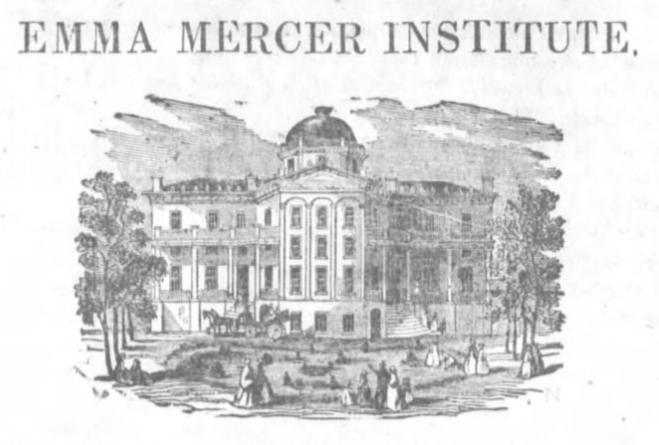
A sketch of the Emma Mercer Institute of Grenada, Mississippi, circa 1868.

Yalobusha closed during the American Civil War and its buildings were used for hospitals.

At the end of the war, Mrs. Emma Holcombe purchased the school building and its property, reopening it in 1866. No later than August 1867, Holcombe renamed the school Emma Mercer Institute.

Under Holcombe's leadership, the Emma Mercer Institute emphasized "sound learning, without pretense and show" and "discipline and order, enforced by firmess, and courtesy." A full renovation was completed in 1870 and the school re-committed itself to Southern women's education.

By 1875, the school had financial problem. The local Grange unsuccessfully attempted to buy the institute and turn it into an industrial school. A stock company purchased the property and turned the school into the Grenada Female College.

== Grenada College ==
In June 1882, Grenada Female College was placed for sale "to the highest bidder." It was purchased by the Methodist church, which renamed it Grenada College in 1884.

As of 1915, the college granted both Bachelor of Arts and Bachelor of Letters degrees, and had 13 faculty members.

In 1936, financial troubles led the church to close the school and transfer its assets to Millsaps College. The buildings were finally destroyed in the 1980s.

== Notable faculty and alumnae ==
- George Robert Hightower
- Blanche Colton Williams — author, head of the English department at Grenada College, and later head of the English department at Hunter College.
