= Grenada, Mississippi =

City in Mississippi, United States

Grenada
- City
- City of Grenada
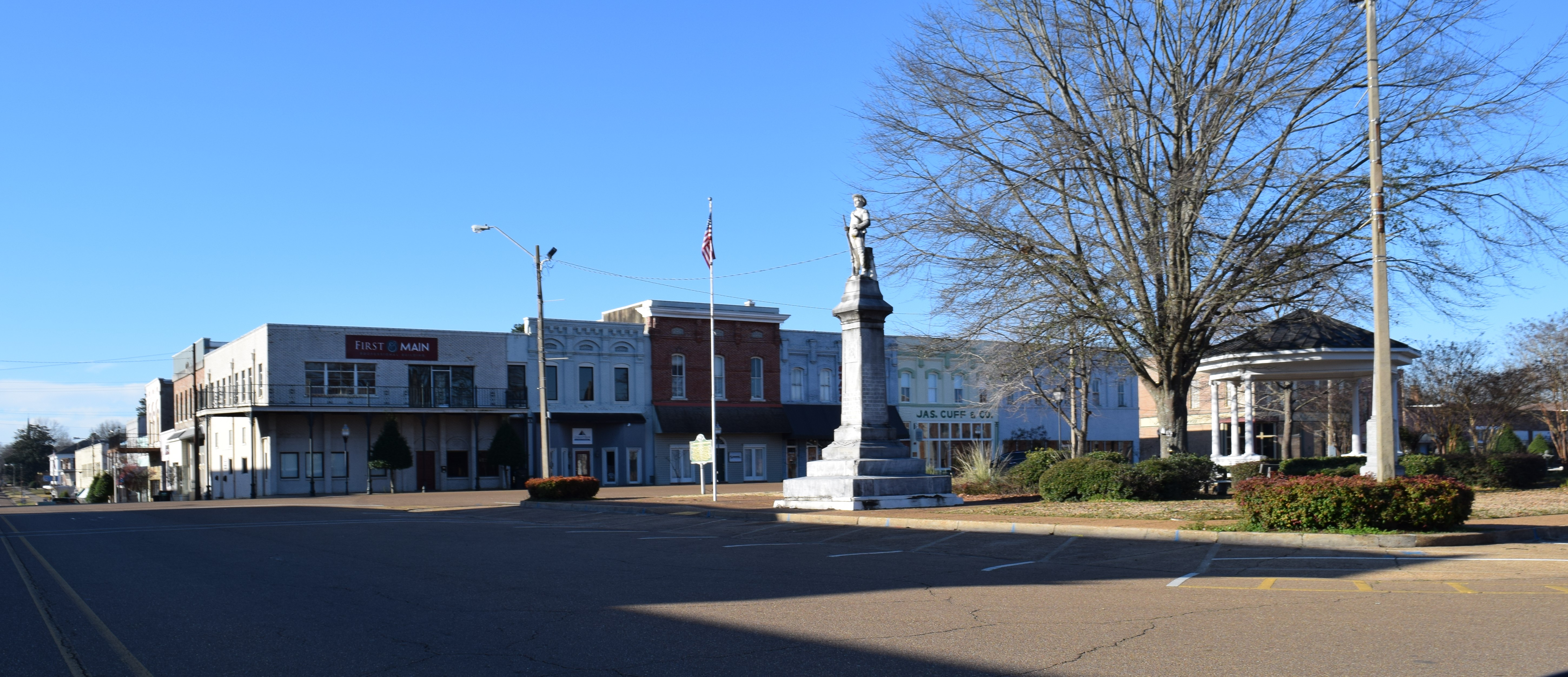
- Downtown Grenada

- Flag Seal

- Location in Grenada County and Mississippi

- Location in the United States
- Coordinates: 33°46′30″N 89°48′32″W
- Country: United States
- State: Mississippi
- County: Grenada
- Districts: 1, 2, 3, 4, 5
- Incorporated: February 27, 1836

Government
  - Type: Council–manager
  - Mayor: Charles H. Latham (I)
  - Assumed office: May 17, 2024
  - Council: Warren Cox (Ward 1); Frederick "Pete" Wilson (Ward 2); Lewis Johnson (Ward 3); Michael Smith (Ward 4); Eric Harris (Ward 5); Lori Chavis (Ward 6); Ronnie Merriman (Ward 7)
  - City manager: Dr. Trina George

Area
  - Total: 30.03 sq mi (77.78 km^{2})
  - Land: 30.01 sq mi (77.72 km^{2})
  - Water: 0.023 sq mi (0.06 km^{2})
- Elevation: 213 ft (65 m)

Population (2020)
  - Total: 12,700
  - Density: 423.2/sq mi (163.41/km^{2})
- Time zone: UTC−6 (Central (CST))
  - Summer (DST): UTC−5 (CDT)
- ZIP codes: 38901-38902
- Area code: 662
- FIPS code: 28-29460
- GNIS feature ID: 0670734
- Website: cityofgrenada.net

Grenada (/ɡrəˈneɪdə/) is a city in Grenada County, Mississippi, United States, founded in 1836. As of the 2020 census, Grenada had a population of 12,700. It is the county seat of Grenada County.

== History ==
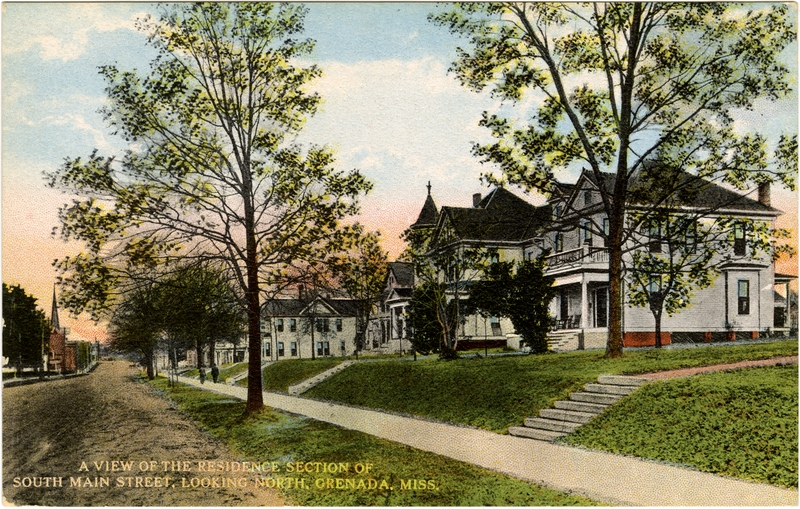
South Main Street, Grenada

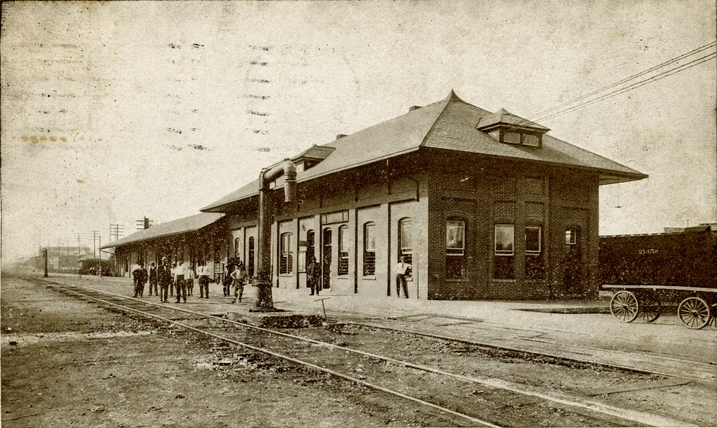
Grenada Depot, c. 1910

Grenada was formed in 1836, after federal removal of the Choctaw people who had previously occupied this territory. It was the result of the union of the two adjacent towns (separated by the present-day Line Street) of Pittsburg and Tulahoma (or Tullahoma), founded, respectively, by Franklin Plummer and Hiram Runnels.

Development included stores and businesses that supported the county court and market days. Plantations were first developed along the Yalobusha River for transportation and access to water. Cotton was the major commodity crop, dependent on the labor of African slaves.

In 1851, Grenada townspeople founded the Yalobusha Baptist Female Institute for education of their young White women. In 1882, the school was taken over by the Methodists and renamed as Grenada College. Classified in the 20th century as a junior college, it encountered financial troubles during the Great Depression. The church closed the college in 1936 and transferred its assets to Millsaps College.

John N. Forrest had a house on a hill in West Grenada.

On December 20, 1862, Confederate General Earl Van Dorn, whose troops were encamped in Grenada, led the three brigades under his command in a raid that destroyed the Union supply depot at Holly Springs, Mississippi.

In 1885, two white men, Perry McChristian and Felix Williams, were accused of murdering two peddlers and were lynched. During the lynching, they implicated two black men, Bartley James and John Campbell, who were then also lynched.

=== Civil rights era ===
In 1966, Martin Luther King Jr. and Dick Gregory spent a week demonstrating in Grenada against discrimination and for voters' rights. During that time, town officials co-operated and protected marchers with local police. Six black voter registrars were hired and registered about 1,000 black residents during that week. After the march passed through, the county fired the registrars and the town never entered the new black voters on official rolls; they had to start over again to gain official voter registration.

As the civil-rights movement continued to press in 1966 and 1967 for voter registration and opportunities in employment, the Southern Christian Leadership Conference ran a civil-rights organizing project in Grenada, which lasted at least 11 months. They worked to register voters and gain concessions for hiring black Americans in local businesses and restaurants. These were still segregated, despite the federal antisegregation and voting-rights laws.

In August 1966, a federal judge ordered Grenada to allow black students to enroll in the previously all-white schools. White leaders used threats of eviction and firing to coerce black parents to withdraw their children from school. While the intimidation caused 200 of 450 students to withdraw, the remaining 250 students attempted to enter school on September 12, 1966. A group of white people met them at the school and chased them away, pursuing them through the streets and beating the children with chains, pipes, and clubs. The group went so far as to beat reporters, as well. The group repeated this for the first week of school, while local law enforcement did not intervene. Federal protection for the children began on September 17, and 13 members of the group were arrested.

=== Industrial growth ===
In recent years, Grenada has seen significant industrial growth. Milwaukee Tool announced a major expansion in 2022, creating 800 new jobs and establishing a new facility in the area. This expansion was part of a broader effort to bolster the local economy and provide new employment opportunities. Additionally, the Grenada Business and Technology Park North was awarded a $4.3 million MDA site-development grant, further promoting industrial and technological growth in the area.

== Geography ==
The Yalobusha River flows through Grenada. Grenada Lake is located a short distance east of the city. According to the United States Census Bureau, the city has a total area of 30.0 square miles (78 km^{2}), of which 0.03% is covered by water.

=== Climate ===
Climate data for Grenada, Mississippi (1991–2020 normals, extremes 1953–2015)
Month	Jan	Feb	Mar	Apr	May	Jun	Jul	Aug	Sep	Oct	Nov	Dec	Year
Record high °F (°C)	83 (28)	87 (31)	89 (32)	93 (34)	98 (37)	105 (41)	104 (40)	105 (41)	105 (41)	98 (37)	87 (31)	89 (32)	105 (41)
Mean daily maximum °F (°C)	53.8 (12.1)	58.3 (14.6)	67.4 (19.7)	75.1 (23.9)	81.8 (27.7)	88.8 (31.6)	91.5 (33.1)	91.5 (33.1)	87.4 (30.8)	77.2 (25.1)	65.5 (18.6)	56.8 (13.8)	74.6 (23.7)
Daily mean °F (°C)	42.6 (5.9)	46.1 (7.8)	54.3 (12.4)	62.1 (16.7)	70.3 (21.3)	78.0 (25.6)	80.9 (27.2)	80.1 (26.7)	74.8 (23.8)	63.4 (17.4)	52.5 (11.4)	45.4 (7.4)	62.5 (17.0)
Mean daily minimum °F (°C)	31.3 (−0.4)	33.9 (1.1)	41.3 (5.2)	49.2 (9.6)	58.8 (14.9)	67.1 (19.5)	70.3 (21.3)	68.7 (20.4)	62.2 (16.8)	49.7 (9.8)	39.5 (4.2)	34.0 (1.1)	50.5 (10.3)
Record low °F (°C)	−12 (−24)	4 (−16)	12 (−11)	22 (−6)	33 (1)	44 (7)	50 (10)	51 (11)	35 (2)	25 (−4)	15 (−9)	1 (−17)	−12 (−24)
Average precipitation inches (mm)	5.08 (129)	5.78 (147)	5.61 (142)	6.42 (163)	5.53 (140)	4.85 (123)	5.43 (138)	3.58 (91)	4.36 (111)	3.56 (90)	4.84 (123)	6.49 (165)	61.53 (1,562)
Average snowfall inches (cm)	0.5 (1.3)	0.4 (1.0)	0.2 (0.51)	0.0 (0.0)	0.0 (0.0)	0.0 (0.0)	0.0 (0.0)	0.0 (0.0)	0.0 (0.0)	0.0 (0.0)	0.0 (0.0)	0.0 (0.0)	1.1 (2.81)
Average precipitation days (≥ 0.01 in)	9.9	9.3	9.6	8.6	8.7	8.1	8.1	7.1	5.9	6.4	7.7	9.3	98.7
Average snowy days (≥ 0.1 in)	0.1	0.2	0.1	0.0	0.0	0.0	0.0	0.0	0.0	0.0	0.0	0.0	0.4
Source: NOAA

== Demographics ==
Historical population
Census	Pop.	Note	%±
1870	1,887		—
1880	1,914		1.4%
1890	2,416		26.2%
1900	2,568		6.3%
1910	2,814		9.6%
1920	3,402		20.9%
1930	4,349		27.8%
1940	5,831		34.1%
1950	7,388		26.7%
1960	7,914		7.1%
1970	9,944		25.7%
1980	11,508		15.7%
1990	10,864		−5.6%
2000	14,879		37.0%
2010	13,092		−12.0%
2020	12,700		−3.0%
U.S. Decennial Census

=== 2020 census ===
As of the 2020 census, 12,700 people and 2,988 families were residing in the city. The median age was 39.6 years; 24.5% of residents were under 18 and 18.6% were 65 or older. For every 100 females, there were 82.6 males, and for every 100 females 18 and over, there were 76.8 males 18 and over.

About 80.8% of residents lived in urban areas, while 19.2% lived in rural areas.

Of the 5,287 households, 30.8% had children under 18 living in them, 30.3% were married-couple households, 19.3% were households with a male householder and no spouse or partner present, and 44.9% were households with a female householder and no spouse or partner present. About 35.4% of all households were made up of individuals, and 16.1% had someone living alone who was 65 ge or older.

The city had 6,105 housing units, of which 13.4% were vacant. The homeowner vacancy rate was 1.4% and the rental vacancy rate was 15.3%.

Grenada racial composition
Race	Num.	Perc.
White (non-Hispanic)	4,799	37.79%
Black or African American (non-Hispanic)	7,293	57.43%
Native American	8	0.06%
Asian	67	0.53%
Other or multiracial	344	2.71%
Hispanic or Latino	189	1.49%

=== 2000 census ===
As of the census of 2000, 14,879 people, 5,701 households, and 3,870 families resided in the city. The population density was 496.8 inhabitants per square mile (191.8/km^{2}). The 6,210 housing units had an average density of 207.3 per square mile (80.0/km^{2}). The racial makeup of the city was 49.28% White, 49.34% African American, 0.16% Native American, 0.50% Asian, 0.14% from other races, and 0.56% from two or more races. Hispanics or Latinos of any race were 0.70% of the population.

Of the 5,701 households, 33.4% had children under 18 living with them, 41.9% were married couples living together, 22.2% had a female householder with no husband present, and 32.1% were not families. About 28.3% of all households were made up of individuals, and 12.1% had someone living alone who was 65 or older. The average household size was 2.52, and the average family size was 3.10.

In the city, the age distribution was 27.5% under 18, 9.4% from 18 to 24, 26.7% from 25 to 44, 20.5% from 45 to 64, and 15.9% who were 65 or older. The median age was 35 years. For every 100 females, there were 82.5 males. For every 100 females 18 and over, there were 76.5 males.

The median income in the city for a household was $25,589 and for a family was $31,316. Males had a median income of $27,946 versus $21,913 for females. The per capita income for the city was $13,734. About 20.3% of families and 23.6% of the population were below the poverty line, including 30.1% of those under 18 and 27.3% of those 65 or over.

== Education ==
=== History ===
Prior to 1966, a segregated system of schools was provided, with black children attending one set of schools and white children another. In 1966, the school system instituted a "freedom of choice" plan, which allowed black students to attend previously all-white schools. White people congregated outside the schools to prevent black students from entering and attacked young children when they left school in the afternoon. In response, parents established the Grenada Educational Foundation, now known as Kirk Academy, as an alternative to racially-integrated education.

=== Modern education ===
Grenada, as well as Grenada County, is currently served by the Grenada School District. The city also hosts the Grenada campus of Holmes Community College, located near the University of Mississippi Medical Center Grenada. Since its establishment in 1985, the campus has provided academic courses, technical programs, and workforce training.

Since 2008, Holmes Community College has partnered with the University of Mississippi (Ole Miss) to offer a range of undergraduate and graduate degree programs at the Grenada campus. This collaboration is part of the 2+2 program, where students complete the first two years of their college education at Holmes and then transition to Ole Miss to complete their bachelor's degrees.

== Notable people ==
- Phillip Alford, actor
- Chris Avery, football player
- Genard Avery, football player
- Pete Boone, athletic director
- E.L. Boteler, politician and businessman
- Big George Brock, blues singer and harmonica player
- Ace Cannon, musician
- Walter Davis, blues musician
- Emmanuel Forbes, football player
- Jake Gibbs, baseball player, All American football player
- George Robert Hightower, educator
- Mississippi John Hurt, country blues singer and guitarist
- M. D. Jennings, football player
- Trent Lott, U.S. senator
- John Marascalco, songwriter
- Jim Miles, baseball player
- Dave Parker, Hall of Fame baseball player
- Ike Pearson, baseball player
- Tyre Phillips, football player
- Freeman Ransom, lawyer, businessman, and civic activist
- Greg Robinson, football player
- Magic Sam, blues musician
- Joseph D. Sayers, 22nd governor of Texas
- Magic Slim, blues musician
- Homer Spragins, baseball player
- Trumaine Sykes, football player
- Donna Tartt, author
- Edward C. Walthall, United States senator
- Howard Waugh, Canadian football player and humanitarian
- Luke J. Weathers (1920–2011), former Tuskegee Airmen
- Eddie Willis, member of Funk Brothers
- William Winter, governor of Mississippi (1980–1984)
- Charlie Worsham, country singer, musician, and songwriter
- Frank Wright, jazz musician

== See also ==
- Billups Neon Crossing Signal, a unique railroad crossing signal erected in Grenada
- List of municipalities in Mississippi
- National Register of Historic Places listings in Grenada County, Mississippi
