= National Register of Historic Places listings in Grenada County, Mississippi =

Location of Grenada County in Mississippi

This is a list of the National Register of Historic Places listings in Grenada County, Mississippi.

This is intended to be a complete list of the properties and districts on the National Register of Historic Places in Grenada County, Mississippi, United States. Latitude and longitude coordinates are provided for many National Register properties and districts; these locations may be seen together in a map.

There are 16 properties and districts listed on the National Register in the county.

This National Park Service list is complete through NPS recent listings posted October 23, 2026.

== Current listings ==
	Name on the Register	Image	Date listed	Location	City or town	Description
1	Confederate Earthworks		July 2, 1973 (#73001008)	West of Grenada off Mississippi Highway 8; 33°47′46″N 89°46′23″W	Grenada	
2	Confederate Redoubt	Confederate Redoubt	May 29, 2015 (#15000296)	Springhill Rd. 33°46′36″N 89°49′11″W	Grenada	
3	Evergreen Plantation	Evergreen Plantation	October 18, 1977 (#77000786)	4 miles north of Grenada on Hardy Rd. 33°50′10″N 89°50′38″W	Grenada	
4	Glenwild Plantation Manager's House	Glenwild Plantation Manager's House	May 12, 1999 (#99000499)	3557 U.S. Highway 51, S. 33°43′11″N 89°46′49″W	Grenada	
5	Grenada Bank	Grenada Bank	November 28, 1978 (#78001598)	223 1st St. 33°47′02″N 89°48′07″W	Grenada	
6	Grenada Downtown Historic District	Grenada Downtown Historic District	September 10, 2014 (#14000563)	Bounded by Pearl, Mound, 2nd, South, Lynch & Doak Sts. 33°47′04″N 89°48′09″W	Grenada	
7	Grenada Masonic Temple	Grenada Masonic Temple	January 20, 1988 (#87002307)	210 S. Main St. 33°46′58″N 89°48′09″W	Grenada	
8	Illinois Central Depot	Illinois Central Depot	April 7, 1988 (#87002308)	643 1st St. 33°46′57″N 89°47′51″W	Grenada	Now used by the Grenada Railroad.
9	Lee-Dubard House		January 20, 1988 (#87002312)	317 3rd St. 33°46′53″N 89°48′08″W	Grenada	
10	Margin St. Historic District	Margin St. Historic District	April 7, 1988 (#87002338)	Margin St. and part of Line St. between Commerce and Green Sts. 33°46′57″N 89°48′25″W	Grenada	
11	Odd Fellows and Confederate Cemetery	Odd Fellows and Confederate Cemetery	January 20, 1988 (#87002341)	Corner of Cemetery and Commerce Sts. 33°46′28″N 89°48′39″W	Grenada	
12	Providence Cemetery	Providence Cemetery	October 2, 1991 (#91001423)	Providence Rd. east of Grenada; 33°42′53″N 89°37′04″W	Grenada	
13	South Main Historic District	South Main Historic District	January 20, 1988 (#87002345)	S. Main St. 33°46′51″N 89°48′13″W	Grenada	
14	US Post Office-Grenada	US Post Office-Grenada	January 9, 1985 (#85000117)	178 S. Main St. 33°47′00″N 89°48′09″W	Grenada	
15	Sen. Edward C. Walthall House	Sen. Edward C. Walthall House	January 20, 1988 (#87002349)	73 College Boulevard; 33°46′40″N 89°48′14″W	Grenada	
16	Wild Wings Mounds (22Gr713)	Wild Wings Mounds (22Gr713)	December 14, 1988 (#88002704)	Address restricted	Holcomb	

== See also ==
- List of National Historic Landmarks in Mississippi
- National Register of Historic Places listings in Mississippi
