= Glenwild, Mississippi =

- Unincorporated community
- Location within Mississippi Location within the United States
- Coordinates: 33°43′15″N 89°46′55″W
- Country: United States
- State: Mississippi
- County: Grenada
- Elevation: 210 ft (64 m)
- Time zone: UTC-6 (Central (CST))
  - Summer (DST): UTC-5 (CDT)
- ZIP code: 38901
- Area code: 662
- GNIS feature ID: 670438

Glenwild is an unincorporated community located in Grenada County, Mississippi and part of the Grenada Micropolitan Statistical Area. Glenwild is approximately 3 miles (4.8 km) south of Tie Plant and approximately 3 miles (4.8 km) north of Elliott near U.S. Route 51.

The community is named for the former Glenwild Plantation. The plantation was originally built in 1839 by Colonel A. M. Payne. It was eventually purchased in 1921 by Lieutenant Commander John Borden (who commanded the USS Kanawha and was awarded the Navy Cross during World War I). Borden had an electric generating plant, a water tower, and a railroad depot built at the plantation. The Panama Limited made regular stops at Glenwild and private Pullman cars brought Borden's guests to the plantation.

Glenwild is located on the former Illinois Central Railroad.
