= Bew Springs, Mississippi =

- Unincorporated community
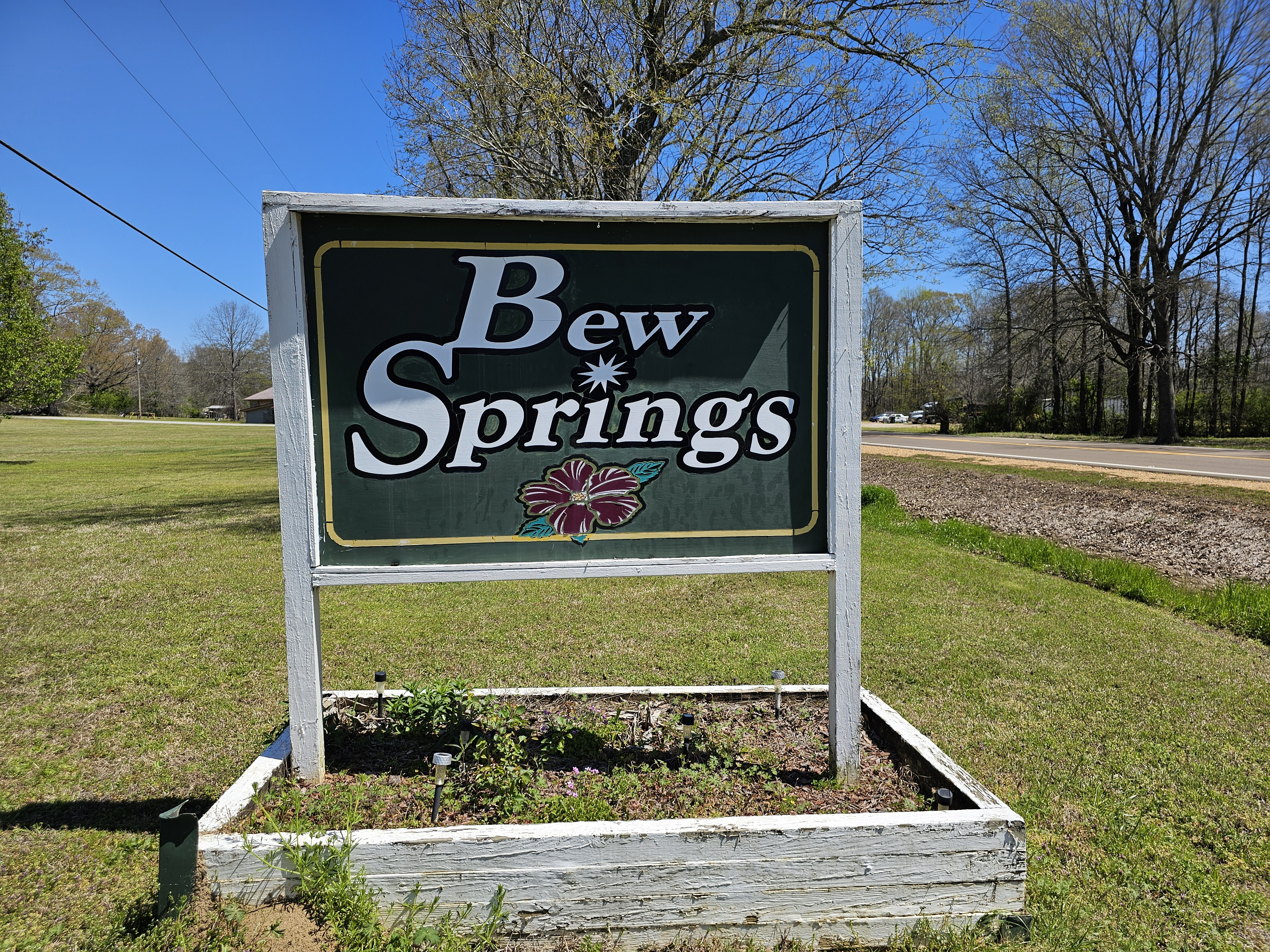

- Location within Mississippi Location within the United States
- Coordinates: 33°47′10″N 89°49′51″W
- Country: United States
- State: Mississippi
- County: Grenada
- Elevation: 180 ft (55 m)
- Time zone: UTC-6 (Central (CST))
  - Summer (DST): UTC-5 (CDT)
- ZIP code: 38929
- Area code: 662
- GNIS feature ID: 667062

Bew Springs is an unincorporated community located in Grenada County, Mississippi and part of the Grenada Micropolitan Statistical Area . Bew Springs is approximately 5 miles (8.0 km) west of Grenada and 5 miles (8.0 km) east of Holcomb along Mississippi Highway 8.

Bew Springs is located on the former Illinois Central Railroad and was once home to a general store.

A post office operated under the name Bew Springs from 1909 to 1918.
