= Robert Keyes (baseball) =

American baseball player (born 1912)

- Pitcher
- Born: October 9, 1912; LeFlore, Mississippi, U.S.
- Died: Unknown; Unknown
- Batted: Unknown Threw: Right

Negro league baseball debut
- 1941, for the Memphis Red Sox

Last appearance
- 1945, for the Memphis Red Sox

Negro American League & Negro National League II statistics
- Win–loss record: 5–8
- Earned run average: 4.42
- Strikeouts: 38

Teams
- Memphis Red Sox (1941–1943); Philadelphia Stars (1943); Memphis Red Sox (1943–1945)

Career highlights and awards
- Negro American League ERA leader (1944)

Robert Keyes (October 9, 1912 – death date unknown), nicknamed "Youngie", was professional baseball pitcher in the Negro leagues in the 1940s.

Keyes made his Negro leagues debut in 1941 with the Memphis Red Sox. He went on to play five seasons with the Red Sox through 1945, and also had a brief stint with the Philadelphia Stars in 1943.
