= Riverdale, Mississippi =

- Unincorporated community
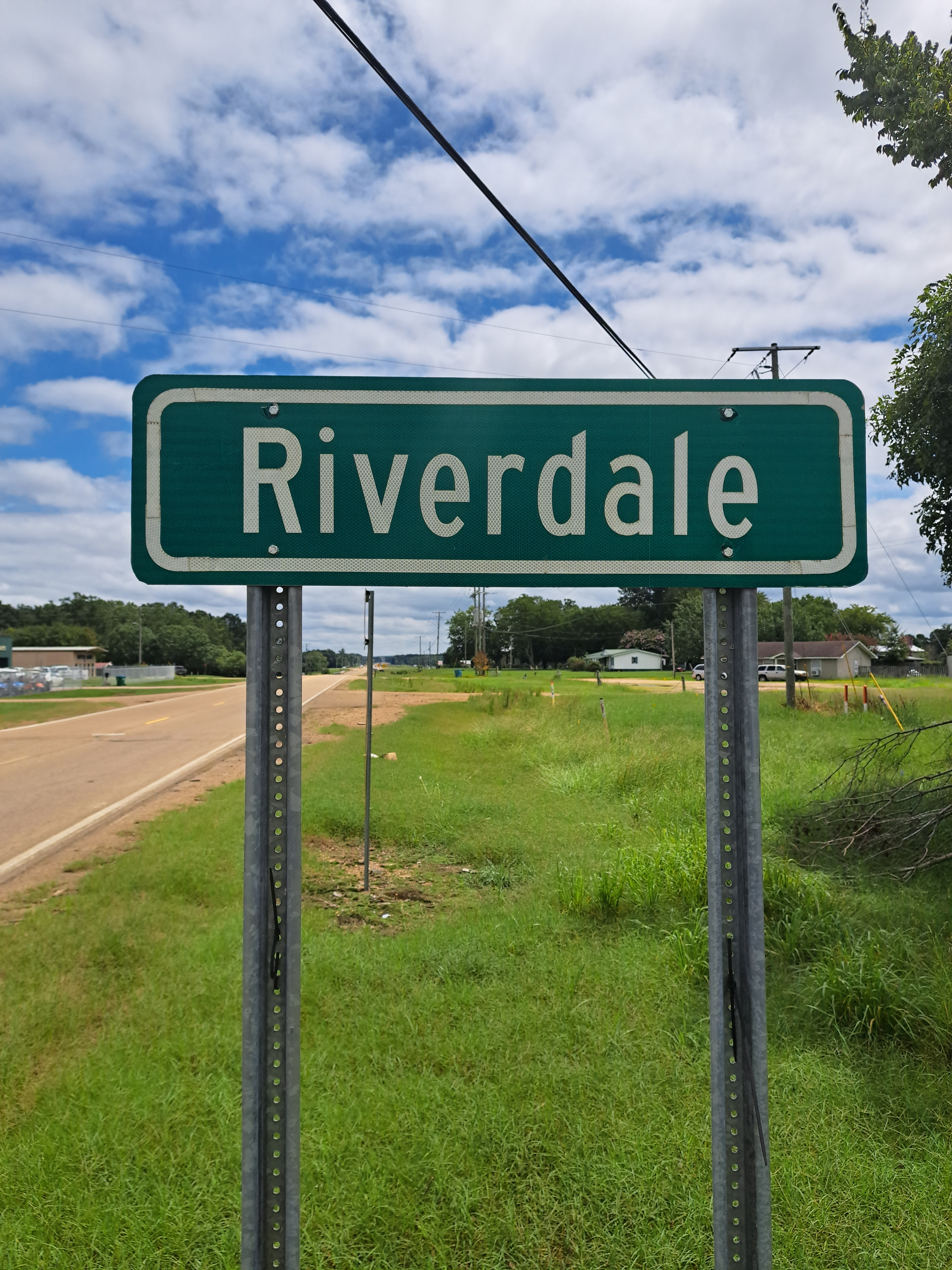

- Location within Mississippi Location within the United States
- Coordinates: 33°50′33″N 89°49′29″W
- Country: United States
- State: Mississippi
- County: Grenada
- Elevation: 200 ft (61 m)
- Time zone: UTC-6 (Central (CST))
  - Summer (DST): UTC-5 (CDT)
- ZIP code: 38901
- Area code: 662
- GNIS feature ID: 676678

Riverdale is an unincorporated community located in Grenada County, Mississippi and part of the Grenada Micropolitan Statistical Area . Riverdale is located within the city limits of Grenada along U.S. Route 51 and Interstate 55.
