= Gore Springs, Mississippi =

- Unincorporated community
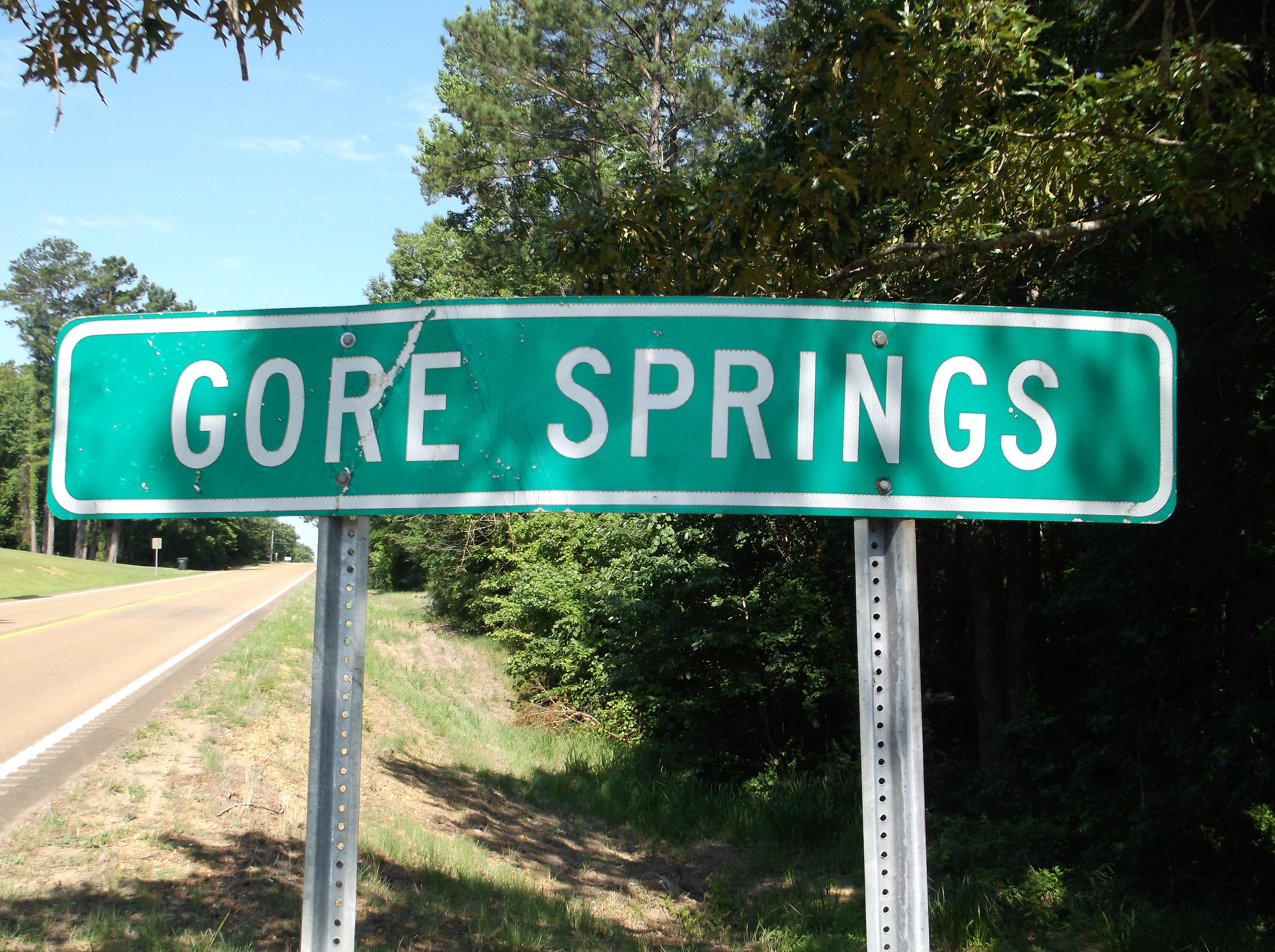

- Location within Mississippi Location within the United States
- Coordinates: 33°45′15″N 89°36′59″W
- Country: United States
- State: Mississippi
- County: Grenada
- Elevation: 361 ft (110 m)
- Time zone: UTC-6 (Central (CST))
  - Summer (DST): UTC-5 (CDT)
- ZIP code: 38929
- Area code: 662
- GNIS feature ID: 670539

Gore Springs is an unincorporated community located in Grenada County, Mississippi, United States and is part of the Grenada Micropolitan Statistical Area. Gore Springs is approximately 12 miles (19 km) east of Grenada on Mississippi Highway 8.

Although an unincorporated community, Gore Springs has a post office and a zip code of 38929.

== Gallery ==
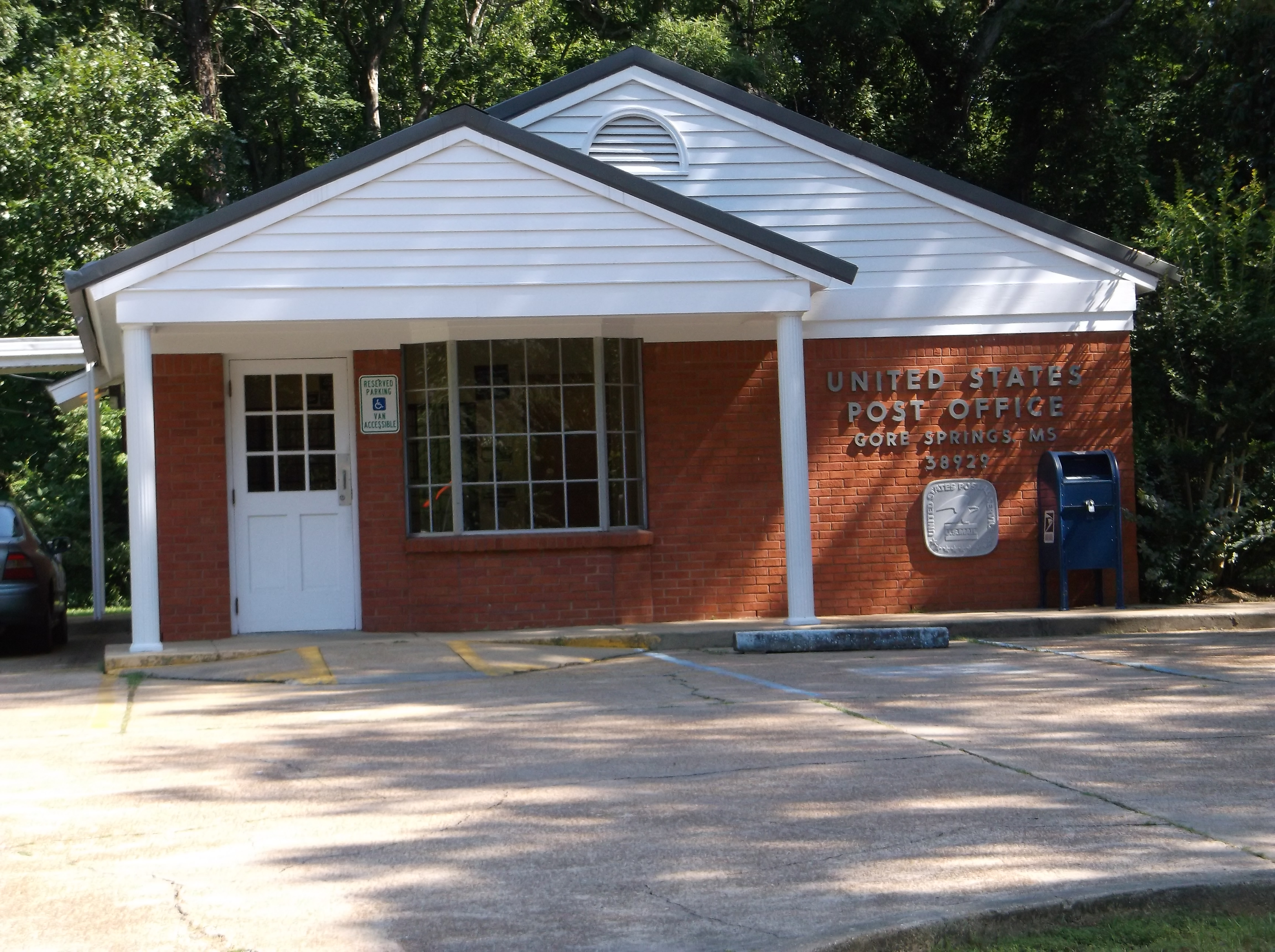
Post Office located on Mississippi Highway 8

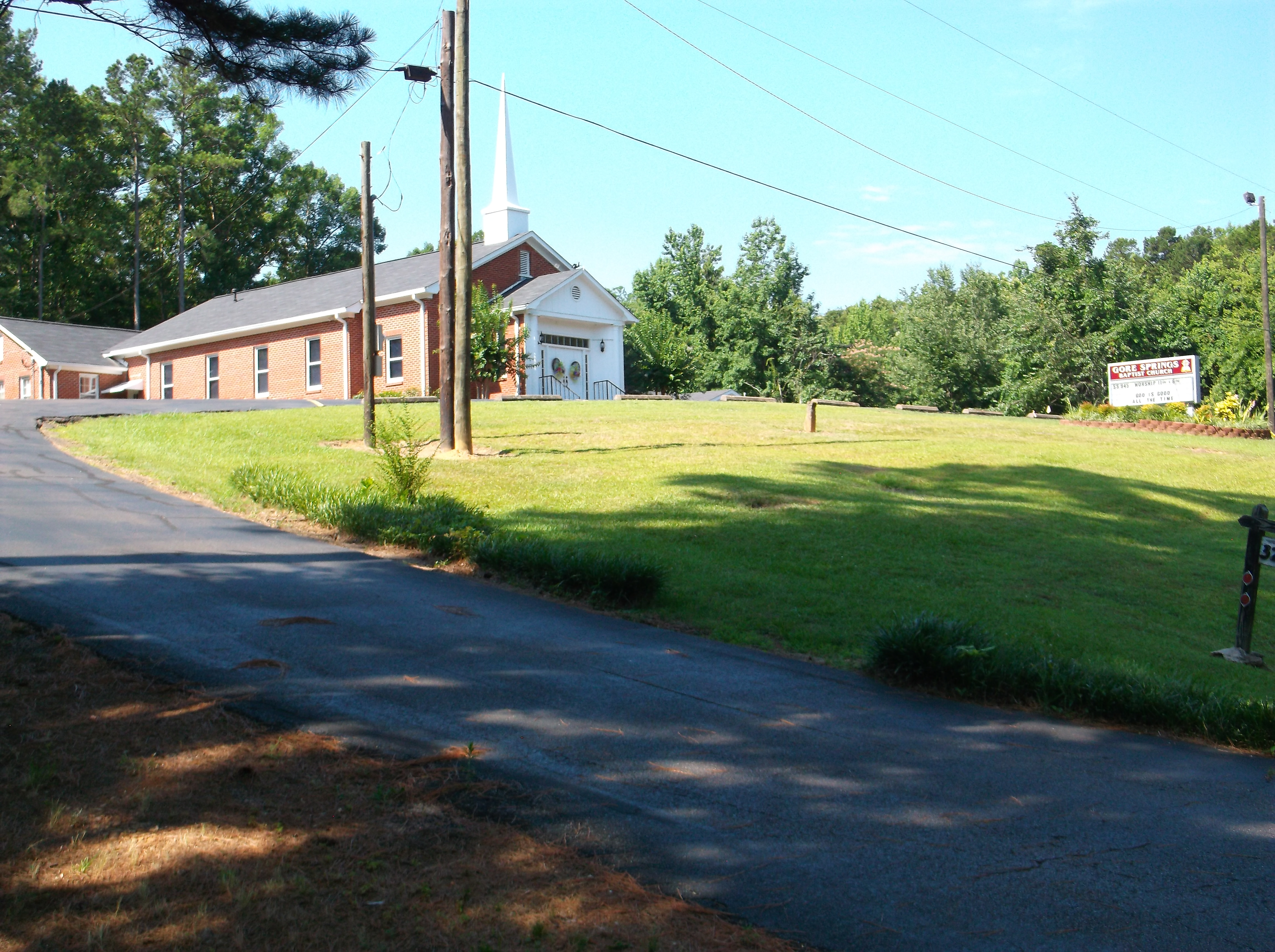
Gore Springs Baptist Church

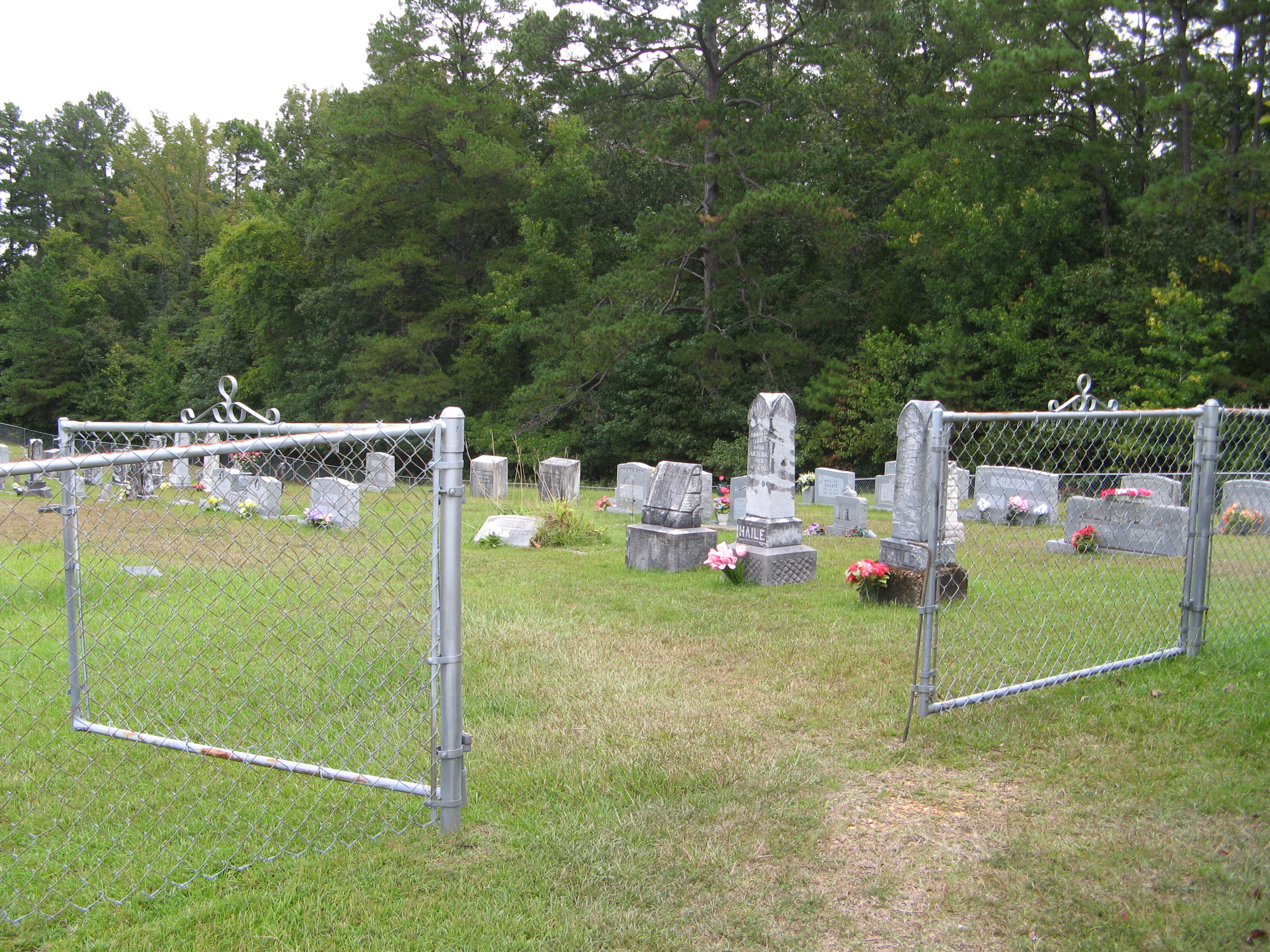
Gore Springs Cemetery
