= Tie Plant, Mississippi =

- Unincorporated community
- Location within Mississippi Location within the United States
- Coordinates: 33°44′29″N 89°47′24″W
- Country: United States
- State: Mississippi
- County: Grenada
- Elevation: 200 ft (61 m)
- Time zone: UTC-6 (Central (CST))
  - Summer (DST): UTC-5 (CDT)
- ZIP code: 38960
- Area code: 662
- GNIS feature ID: 678754

Tie Plant is an unincorporated community located in Grenada County, Mississippi and part of the Grenada Micropolitan Statistical Area. Tie Plant is approximately 3 miles (4.8 km) south of Grenada and approximately 3 miles (4.8 km) north of Glenwild along U.S. Route 51. Although an unincorporated community, Tie Plant has a zip code of 38960.

The community was named for the production of railroad ties near the original town site.
