= Grenada County, Mississippi =

County in Mississippi, United States

- County
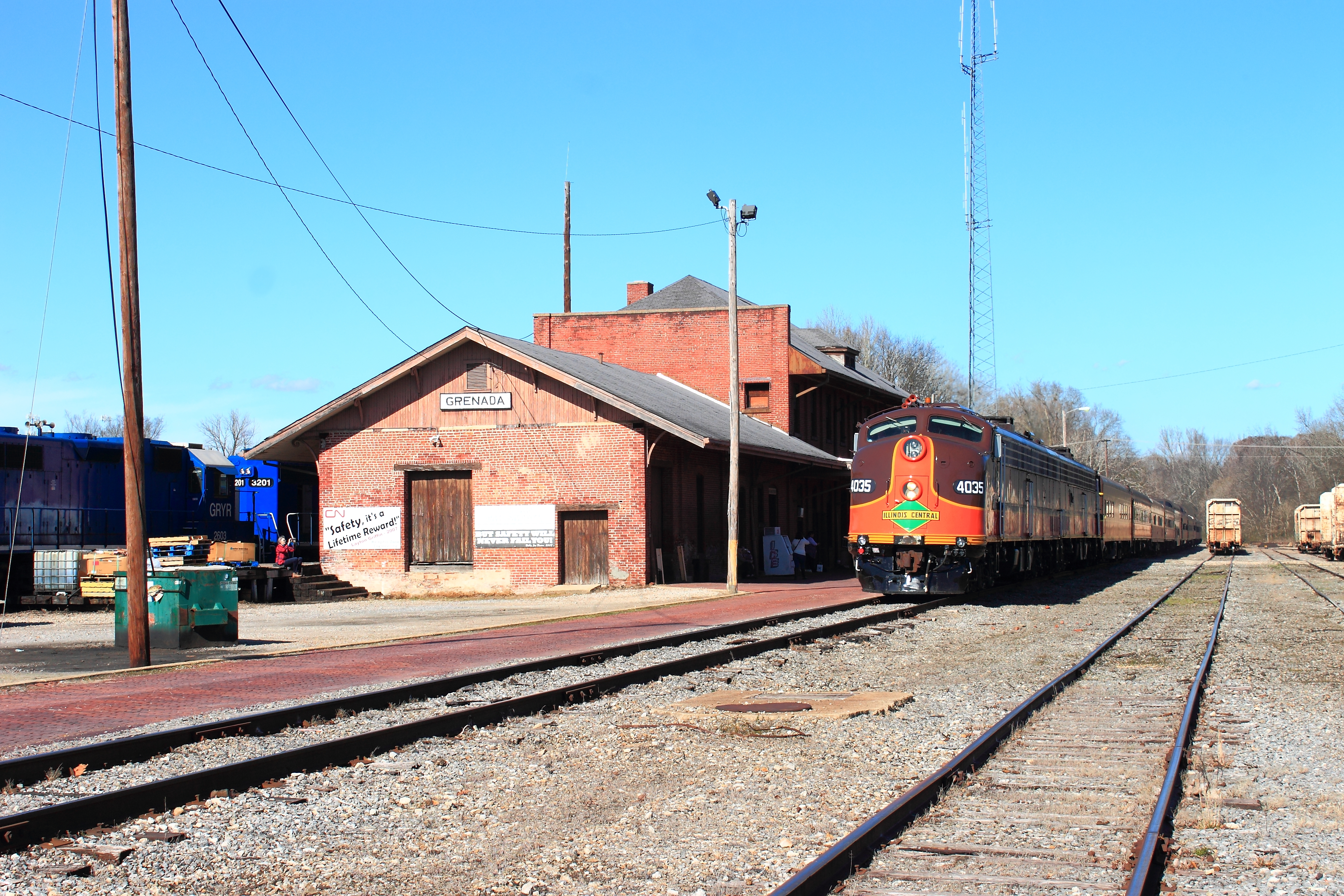
- Illinois Central Depot now used by Grenada Railroad.

- Location within the U.S. state of Mississippi
- Coordinates: 33°46′N 89°48′W
- Country: United States
- State: Mississippi
- Founded: 1870
- Named for: Granada, Spain
- Seat: Grenada
- Largest city: Grenada

Area
  - Total: 449 sq mi (1,160 km^{2})
  - Land: 422 sq mi (1,090 km^{2})
  - Water: 27 sq mi (70 km^{2}) 6.1%

Population (2020)
  - Total: 21,629
  - Estimate (2025): 20,868 ▼
  - Density: 51.3/sq mi (19.8/km^{2})
- Time zone: UTC−6 (Central)
  - Summer (DST): UTC−5 (CDT)
- Congressional district: 2nd

Grenada County is a county located in the U.S. state of Mississippi. As of the 2020 Census, the population was 21,629. Its county seat is Grenada. The county was named for Granada, Spain. Its western half is part of the Mississippi Delta. Cotton cultivation was important to its economy well into the 20th century.

The Grenada, MS Micropolitan Statistical Area includes all of Grenada County.

== Geography ==
According to the U.S. Census Bureau, the county has a total area of 449 square miles (1,160 km^{2}), of which 422 square miles (1,090 km^{2}) is land and 27 square miles (70 km^{2}) (6.1%) is water.

=== Major highways ===
- Interstate 55
- U.S. Highway 51
- Mississippi Highway 7
- Mississippi Highway 8
- Mississippi Highway 35

=== Adjacent counties ===
- Yalobusha County (north)
- Calhoun County (east)
- Webster County (southeast)
- Montgomery County (south)
- Carroll County (south)
- Leflore County (west)
- Tallahatchie County (northwest)

=== National protected area ===
- Tallahatchie National Wildlife Refuge (part)

== Demographics ==
Historical population
Census	Pop.	Note	%±
1870	10,751		—
1880	12,071		12.3%
1890	14,974		24.0%
1900	14,112		−5.8%
1910	15,727		11.4%
1920	13,607		−13.5%
1930	16,802		23.5%
1940	19,052		13.4%
1950	18,830		−1.2%
1960	18,409		−2.2%
1970	19,854		7.8%
1980	21,043		6.0%
1990	21,555		2.4%
2000	23,263		7.9%
2010	21,906		−5.8%
2020	21,629		−1.3%
2025 (est.)	20,868	▼	−3.5%
U.S. Decennial Census; 1790-1960 1900-1990; 1990-2000 2010-2013

=== Racial and ethnic composition ===
Grenada County, Mississippi – Racial and ethnic composition Note: the US Census treats Hispanic/Latino as an ethnic category. This table excludes Latinos from the racial categories and assigns them to a separate category. Hispanics/Latinos may be of any race.
Race / Ethnicity (NH = Non-Hispanic)	Pop 1980	Pop 1990	Pop 2000	Pop 2010	Pop 2020	% 1980	% 1990	% 2000	% 2010	% 2020
White alone (NH)	12,142	12,522	13,414	12,350	11,258	57.70%	58.09%	57.66%	56.38%	52.05%
Black or African American alone (NH)	8,618	8,886	9,480	9,106	9,352	40.95%	41.22%	40.75%	41.57%	43.24%
Native American or Alaska Native alone (NH)	11	30	33	33	29	0.05%	0.14%	0.14%	0.15%	0.13%
Asian alone (NH)	25	31	78	60	84	0.12%	0.14%	0.34%	0.27%	0.39%
Native Hawaiian or Pacific Islander alone (NH)	x	x	3	0	2	x	x	0.01%	0.00%	0.01%
Other race alone (NH)	3	0	4	6	26	0.01%	0.00%	0.02%	0.03%	0.12%
Mixed race or Multiracial (NH)	x	x	106	154	568	x	x	0.46%	0.70%	2.63%
Hispanic or Latino (any race)	244	86	145	197	310	1.16%	0.40%	0.62%	0.90%	1.43%
Total	21,043	21,555	23,263	21,906	21,629	100.00%	100.00%	100.00%	100.00%	100.00%

=== 2020 census ===
As of the 2020 census, the county had a population of 21,629. The median age was 42.1 years. 22.8% of residents were under the age of 18 and 19.4% of residents were 65 years of age or older. For every 100 females there were 88.0 males, and for every 100 females age 18 and over there were 83.7 males age 18 and over.

The racial makeup of the county was 52.4% White, 43.5% Black or African American, 0.2% American Indian and Alaska Native, 0.4% Asian, <0.1% Native Hawaiian and Pacific Islander, 0.4% from some other race, and 3.0% from two or more races. Hispanic or Latino residents of any race comprised 1.4% of the population.

47.5% of residents lived in urban areas, while 52.5% lived in rural areas.

There were 9,030 households in the county, of which 29.4% had children under the age of 18 living in them. Of all households, 37.3% were married-couple households, 19.6% were households with a male householder and no spouse or partner present, and 37.6% were households with a female householder and no spouse or partner present. About 33.2% of all households were made up of individuals and 15.1% had someone living alone who was 65 years of age or older.

There were 10,405 housing units, of which 13.2% were vacant. Among occupied housing units, 63.6% were owner-occupied and 36.4% were renter-occupied. The homeowner vacancy rate was 1.2% and the rental vacancy rate was 16.4%.

=== 2019 ===
As of the 2019 United States Census, there were 20,758 people living in the county.

55.3% were White, 42.9% Black or African American, 0.5% Asian, 0.3% Native American, and 1.1% of two or more races. 1.6% were Hispanic or Latino (of any race).

There were 8,391 households. The median income for a household in the county was $40,122.

== Employment ==
According to the Greater Grenada Partnership, in 2020, the top 3 local employers were Modine, Lennox, and the Grenada School District Top regional employers include Winchester, Toyota Mississippi, and Franklin Corporation. The Bureau of Labor Statistics reports that Grenada has added 1,600 direct jobs between 2011 and 2019.

On April 20, 2021, Milwaukee Tool announced that the manufacturing company will expand in Mississippi by constructing an accessories manufacturing facility in Grenada County. The project is a $60 million corporate investment and will create 800 jobs at the Grenada location.

According to a study commissioned by the Mississippi Development Authority and the Mississippi Department of Transportation, Grenada Railroad supports a total of 11,174 jobs, $1.3 billion in gross product and $1 billion in personal income.

== Infrastructure ==
U.S. Senators Roger Wicker, R-Miss., and Cindy Hyde-Smith, R-Mississippi, announced the award of a $6.22 million grant to Grenada Railroad, LLC., to complete the final phase of a project to refurbish a rail line between Canton, Mississippi, and Memphis, Tennessee. Work in progress on the northern 100-mile project is set for completion in Late 2023. The entire 188 miles of the Memphis, TN to Canton, MS line will be rated at 286,000 gross weight on rails (GWR) with an authorized speed of 40 MPH making it a Class III Short Line Railroad.

== Education ==
Grenada School District is the public school system.

== Communities ==
=== City ===
- Grenada (county seat)

=== Census-designated places ===
- Elliott
- Holcomb

=== Other unincorporated communities ===
- Bew Springs
- Glenwild
- Gore Springs
- Hardy
- Le Flore
- Oxberry
- Riverdale
- Tie Plant

=== Ghost town ===
- Chocchuma

== Politics ==
Originally, Grenada County was almost unanimously Democratic, up through the mid 20th Century. Since then, the county has trended heavily Republican. The last Democrat to carry the county was Jimmy Carter in 1980.

United States presidential election results for Grenada County, Mississippi
Year	Republican		Democratic		Third party(ies)	
Year	No.	%	No.	%	No.	%
1912	3	0.61%	469	94.75%	23	4.65%
1916	28	4.09%	649	94.88%	7	1.02%
1920	12	2.17%	533	96.38%	8	1.45%
1924	17	1.79%	933	98.21%	0	0.00%
1928	40	3.35%	1,155	96.65%	0	0.00%
1932	11	0.99%	1,101	99.01%	0	0.00%
1936	13	1.03%	1,245	98.97%	0	0.00%
1940	62	4.35%	1,354	95.02%	9	0.63%
1944	117	7.85%	1,373	92.15%	0	0.00%
1948	26	1.69%	109	7.07%	1,406	91.24%
1952	1,000	46.00%	1,174	54.00%	0	0.00%
1956	407	18.60%	949	43.37%	832	38.03%
1960	682	29.11%	529	22.58%	1,132	48.31%
1964	3,648	95.92%	155	4.08%	0	0.00%
1968	718	10.11%	2,050	28.86%	4,335	61.03%
1972	4,800	75.09%	1,471	23.01%	121	1.89%
1976	3,569	50.84%	3,263	46.48%	188	2.68%
1980	3,993	48.11%	4,182	50.39%	125	1.51%
1984	5,181	60.80%	3,325	39.02%	15	0.18%
1988	5,352	59.10%	3,683	40.67%	21	0.23%
1992	4,721	49.34%	4,203	43.93%	644	6.73%
1996	4,527	47.88%	4,402	46.56%	526	5.56%
2000	4,743	54.88%	3,813	44.12%	87	1.01%
2004	5,872	58.11%	4,180	41.37%	53	0.52%
2008	6,234	55.07%	5,029	44.42%	58	0.51%
2012	5,986	52.81%	5,288	46.65%	61	0.54%
2016	5,970	56.79%	4,424	42.08%	119	1.13%
2020	6,081	55.73%	4,734	43.39%	96	0.88%
2024	5,651	57.86%	4,060	41.57%	55	0.56%

== See also ==
- National Register of Historic Places listings in Grenada County, Mississippi
