= LeFlore, Mississippi =

- Unincorporated community
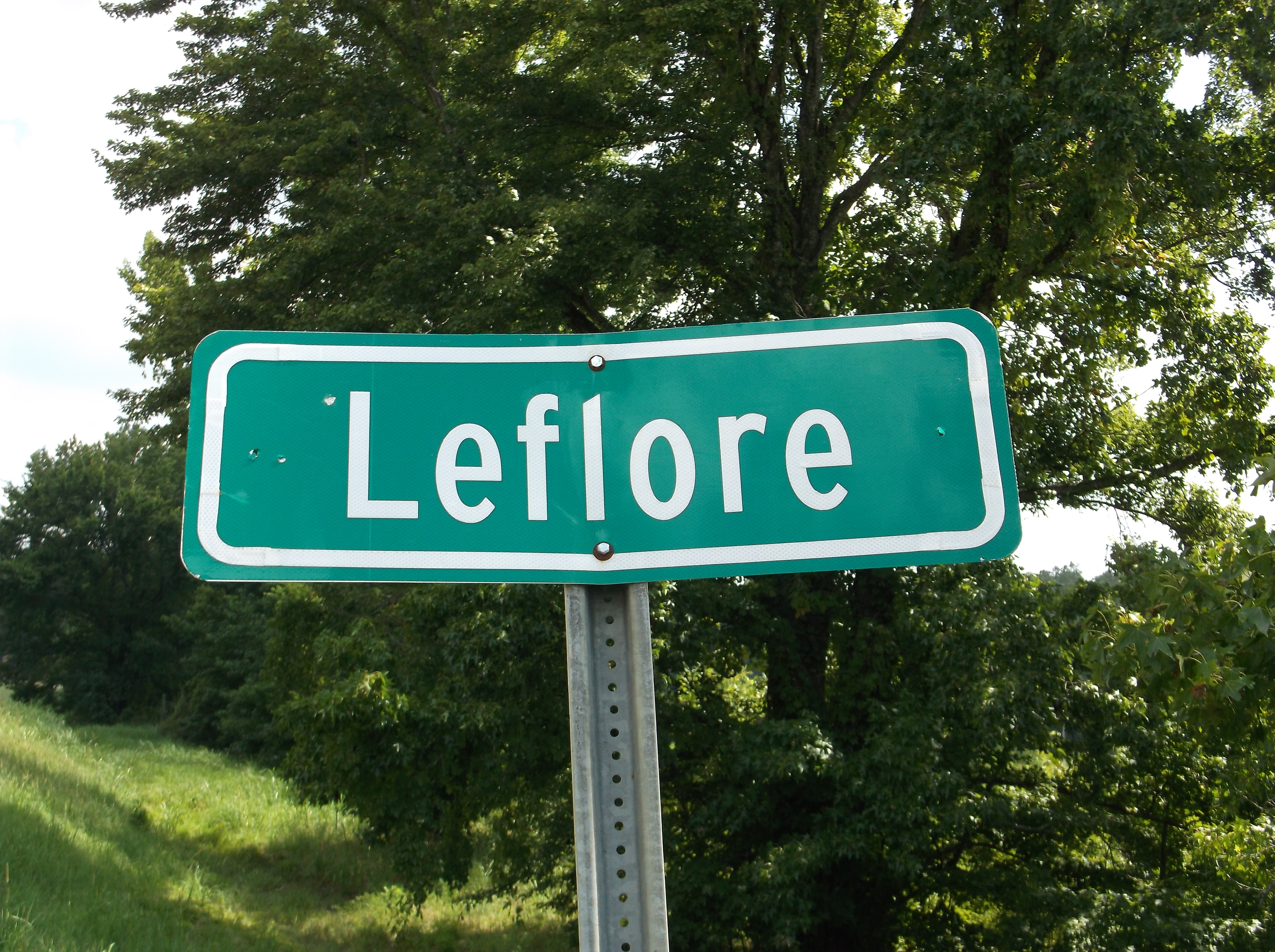

- Location within Mississippi Location within the United States
- Coordinates: 33°41′37″N 90°03′17″W
- Country: United States
- State: Mississippi
- County: Grenada
- Elevation: 154 ft (47 m)
- Time zone: UTC-6 (Central (CST))
  - Summer (DST): UTC-5 (CDT)
- ZIP code: 38940
- Area code: 662
- GNIS feature ID: 672393

LeFlore is an unincorporated community located in Grenada County, Mississippi, United States and part of the Grenada Micropolitan Statistical Area . LeFlore is approximately 10 miles (16 km) south of Holcomb, Mississippi and approximately 3 miles (4.8 km) north of Avalon, Mississippi on Mississippi Highway 7.

The community was once home to three general stores, a hotel, and a cotton gin.

Leflore is located on the former Illinois Central Railroad.

A post office operated under the name Leflore from 1887 to 1978.

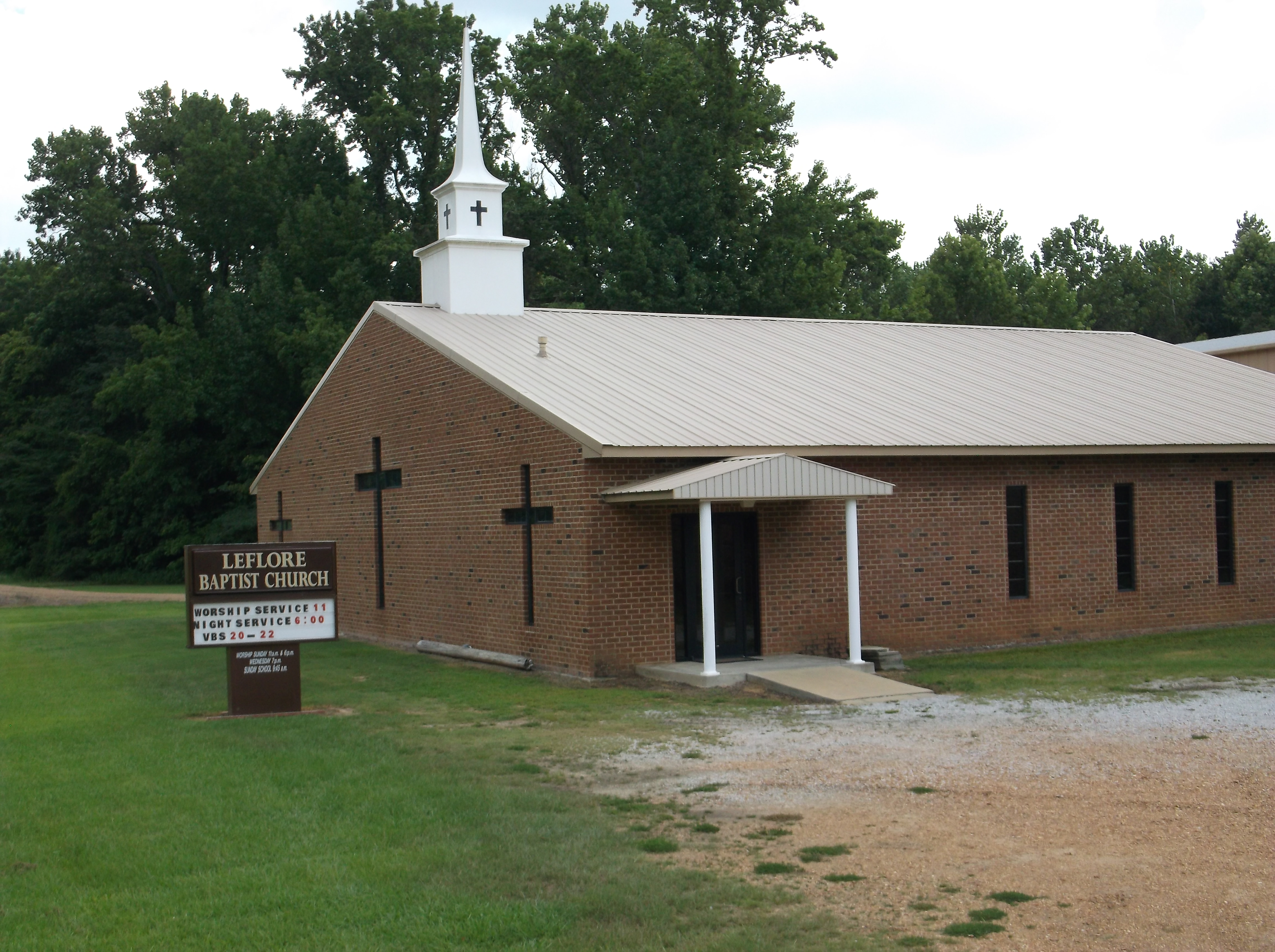
Leflore Baptist Church
