= Elliott, Mississippi =

- Census-designated place
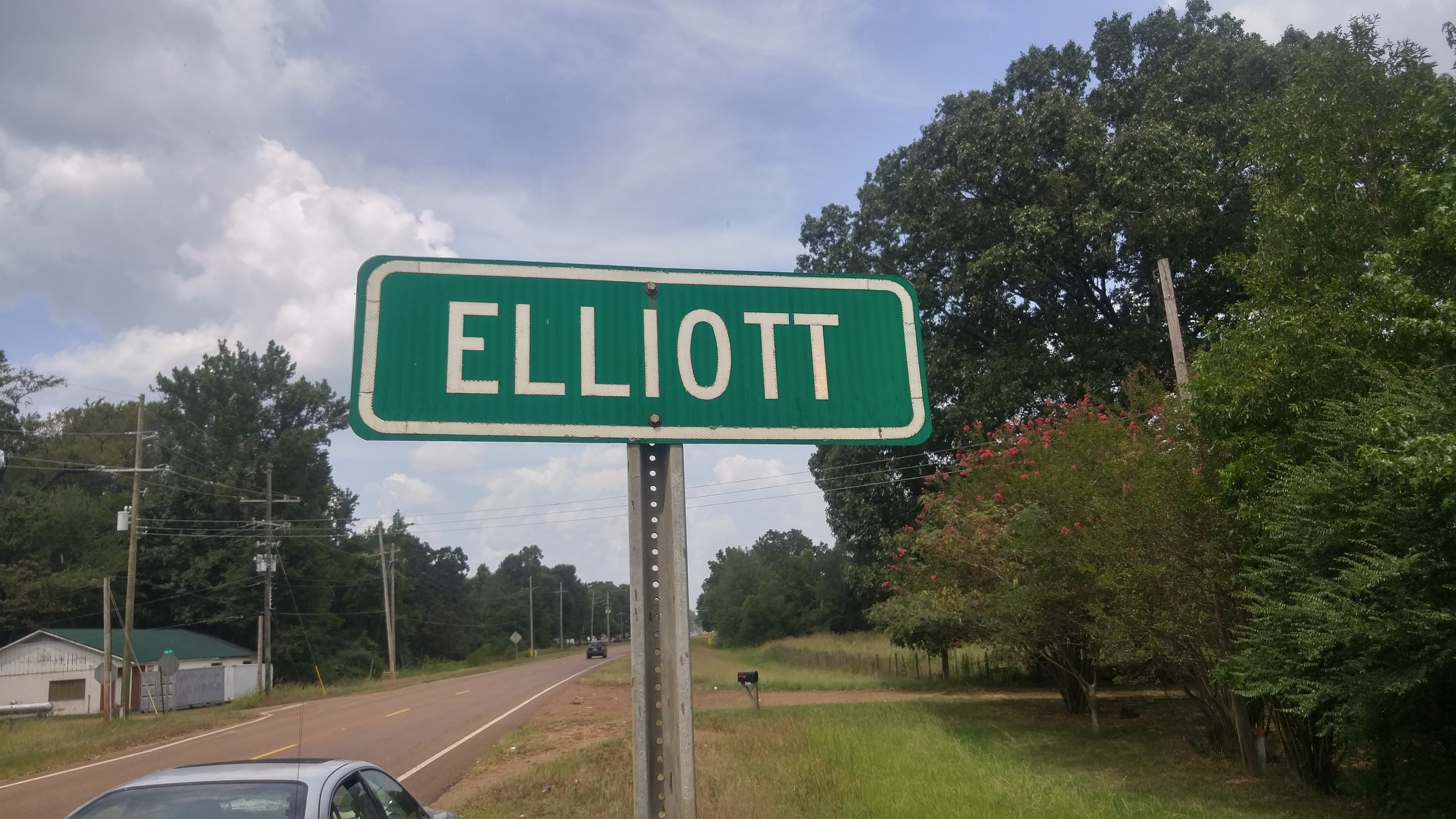

- Location within Mississippi Location within the United States
- Coordinates: 33°41′00″N 89°44′57″W
- Country: United States
- State: Mississippi
- County: Grenada

Area
  - Total: 4.53 sq mi (11.72 km^{2})
  - Land: 4.53 sq mi (11.72 km^{2})
  - Water: 0 sq mi (0.00 km^{2})
- Elevation: 226 ft (69 m)

Population (2020)
  - Total: 880
  - Density: 194.5/sq mi (75.09/km^{2})
- Time zone: UTC-6 (Central (CST))
  - Summer (DST): UTC-5 (CDT)
- ZIP code: 38926
- Area code: 662
- GNIS feature ID: 691837
- FIPS code: 28-21940

Elliott is an unincorporated community and census-designated place (CDP) in Grenada County, Mississippi, United States, and part of the Grenada Micropolitan Statistical Area. As of the 2020 census, Elliott had a population of 880.

Elliott is located on the southern edge of Grenada County, with its southern border following the Montgomery County line. It is along U.S. Route 51, 7 miles (11 km) south of Grenada, the county seat, and 4 miles (6 km) north of Duck Hill. The Camp McCain Training Center of the Mississippi National Guard is 3 miles (5 km) to the east.

According to the U.S. Census Bureau, the Elliott CDP has an area of 4.5 square miles (11.7 km^{2}), all of it land. The community is in the valley of Batupan Bogue, a northwest-flowing tributary of the Yalobusha River.

Elliott is located on the former Illinois Central Railroad.

A post office operated under the name Elliott from 1860 to 1964.

== Demographics ==
Historical population
Census	Pop.	Note	%±
2010	990		—
2020	880		−11.1%
U.S. Decennial Census

Elliot first appeared as a census designated place in the 2010 U.S. census.

=== Racial and ethnic composition ===
Elliott CDP, Mississippi – Racial and ethnic composition Note: the US Census treats Hispanic/Latino as an ethnic category. This table excludes Latinos from the racial categories and assigns them to a separate category. Hispanics/Latinos may be of any race.
Race / Ethnicity (NH = Non-Hispanic)	Pop 2010	Pop 2020	% 2010	% 2020
White alone (NH)	795	662	80.30%	75.23%
Black or African American alone (NH)	172	170	17.37%	19.32%
Native American or Alaska Native alone (NH)	0	4	0.00%	0.45%
Asian alone (NH)	0	5	0.00%	0.57%
Native Hawaiian or Pacific Islander alone (NH)	0	0	0.00%	0.00%
Other race alone (NH)	1	0	0.10%	0.00%
Mixed race or Multiracial (NH)	10	28	1.01%	3.18%
Hispanic or Latino (any race)	12	11	1.21%	1.25%
Total	990	880	100.00%	100.00%
