= Holcomb, Mississippi =

- Census-designated place
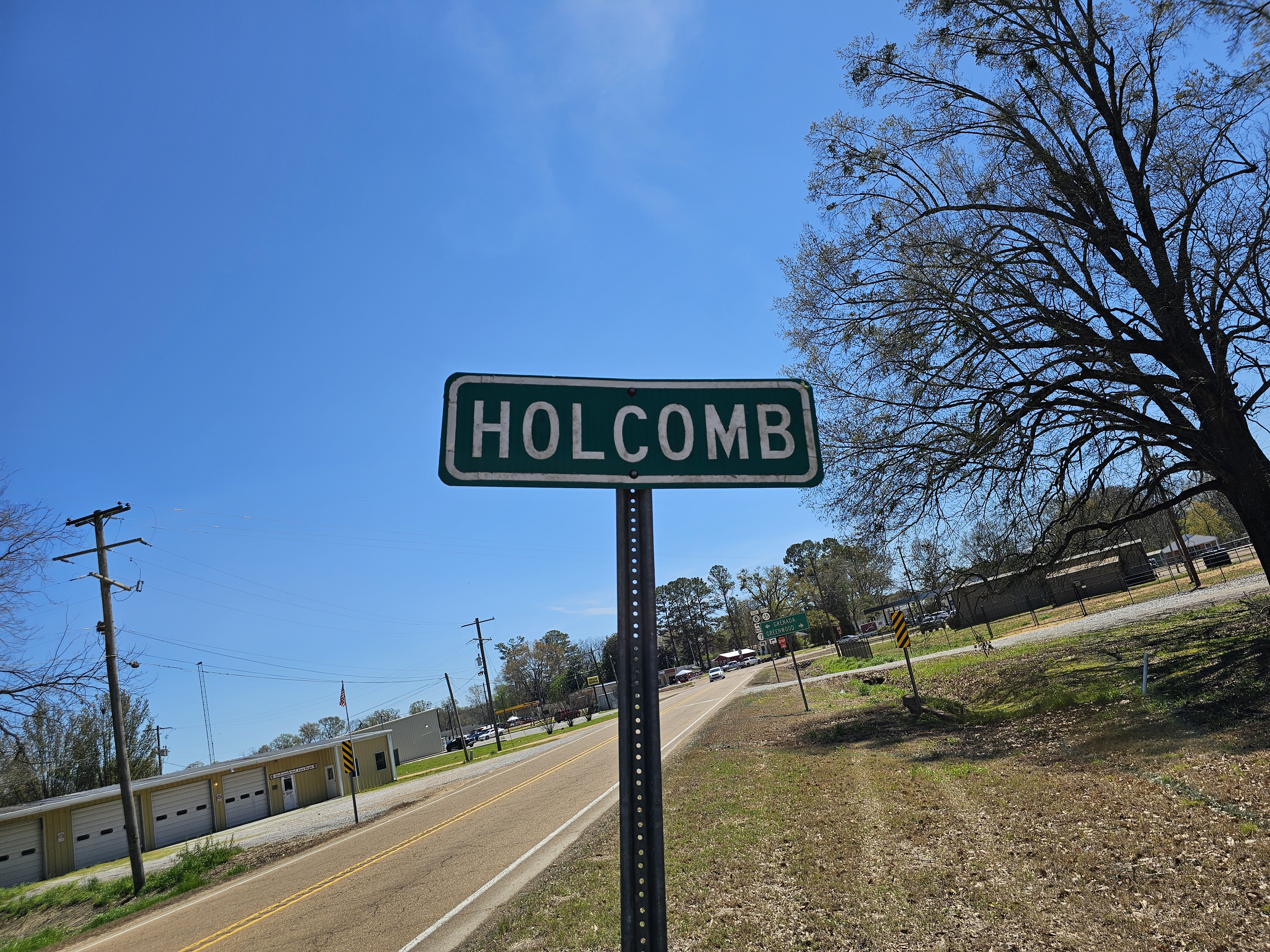

- Location within Mississippi Location within the United States
- Coordinates: 33°45′40″N 89°58′33″W
- Country: United States
- State: Mississippi
- County: Grenada

Area
  - Total: 4.75 sq mi (12.31 km^{2})
  - Land: 4.75 sq mi (12.31 km^{2})
  - Water: 0 sq mi (0.00 km^{2})
- Elevation: 194 ft (59 m)

Population (2020)
  - Total: 568
  - Density: 119.6/sq mi (46.16/km^{2})
- Time zone: UTC-6 (Central (CST))
  - Summer (DST): UTC-5 (CDT)
- ZIP code: 38929
- Area code: 662
- GNIS feature ID: 671276
- FIPS code: 28-32820

Holcomb is an unincorporated community and census-designated place (CDP) in Grenada County, Mississippi, United States. It is part of the Grenada Micropolitan Statistical Area. As of the 2020 census, Holcomb had a population of 568.

Holcomb has a post office with the ZIP Code of 38940.

== History ==
The community was founded in 1901 on land that once was the home site of Choctaw Indian Chief Isaac Perry.

Holcomb is located on the former Illinois Central Railroad.

At one time, Holcomb was home to a stave factory, Munger System Gin, axe handle factory, church, saw mill, and several general stores. The Bank of Holcomb was established in 1905.

== Geography ==
Holcomb is in western Grenada County, on the south side of the valley of the Yalobusha River. Mississippi Highways 7 and 8 pass through the community, together leading east 10 miles (16 km) east to Grenada, the county seat. The two highways split in Holcomb, with Highway 7 leading southwest 23 miles (37 km) to Greenwood and Highway 8 leading west 35 miles (56 km) to Ruleville. Mississippi Highway 35 passes through Holcomb as well, leading south 21 miles (34 km) to Carrollton and north 20 miles (32 km) to Charleston.

According to the U.S. Census Bureau, the Holcomb CDP has an area of 4.7 square miles (12.3 km^{2}), all of it land.

=== Climate ===
The climate in this area is characterized by hot, humid summers and generally mild to cool winters. According to the Köppen Climate Classification system, Holcomb has a humid subtropical climate, abbreviated "Cfa" on climate maps.

== Demographics ==
Historical population
Census	Pop.	Note	%±
2010	600		—
2020	568		−5.3%
U.S. Decennial Census

Holcomb first appeared as a census designated place in the 2010 U.S. census.

=== Racial and ethnic composition ===
Holcomb CDP, Mississippi – Racial and ethnic composition Note: the US Census treats Hispanic/Latino as an ethnic category. This table excludes Latinos from the racial categories and assigns them to a separate category. Hispanics/Latinos may be of any race.
Race / Ethnicity (NH = Non-Hispanic)	Pop 2010	Pop 2020	% 2010	% 2020
White alone (NH)	350	308	58.33%	54.23%
Black or African American alone (NH)	239	229	39.83%	40.32%
Native American or Alaska Native alone (NH)	1	0	0.17%	0.00%
Asian alone (NH)	0	4	0.00%	0.70%
Native Hawaiian or Pacific Islander alone (NH)	0	0	0.00%	0.00%
Other race alone (NH)	0	1	0.00%	0.18%
Mixed race or Multiracial (NH)	5	19	0.83%	3.35%
Hispanic or Latino (any race)	5	7	0.83%	1.23%
Total	600	568	100.00%	100.00%

== Notable natives ==
- Kristi Addis, 1987 Miss Teen USA

== Gallery ==
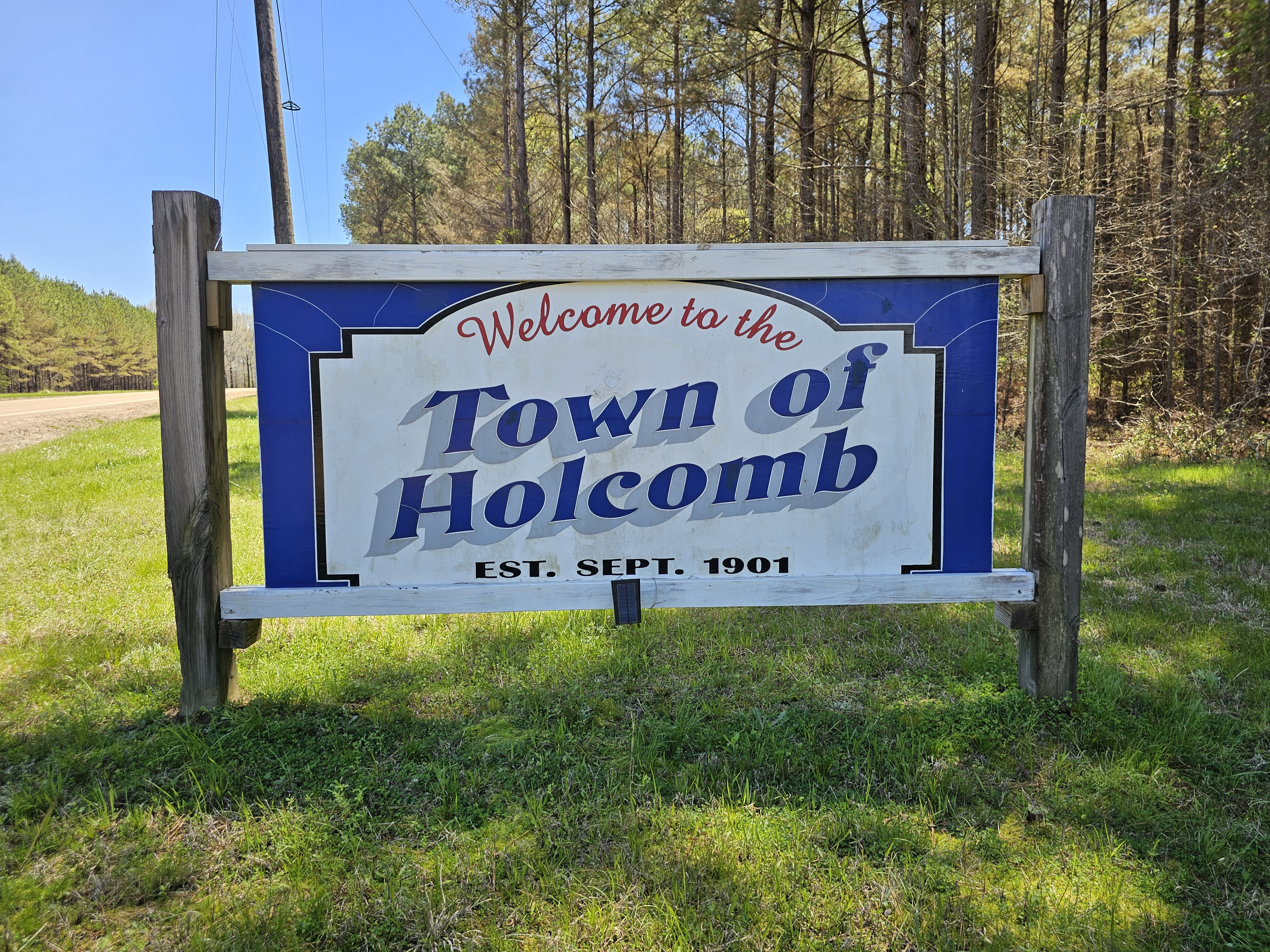
Sign on Mississippi Highway 8 indicating the founding date of the community

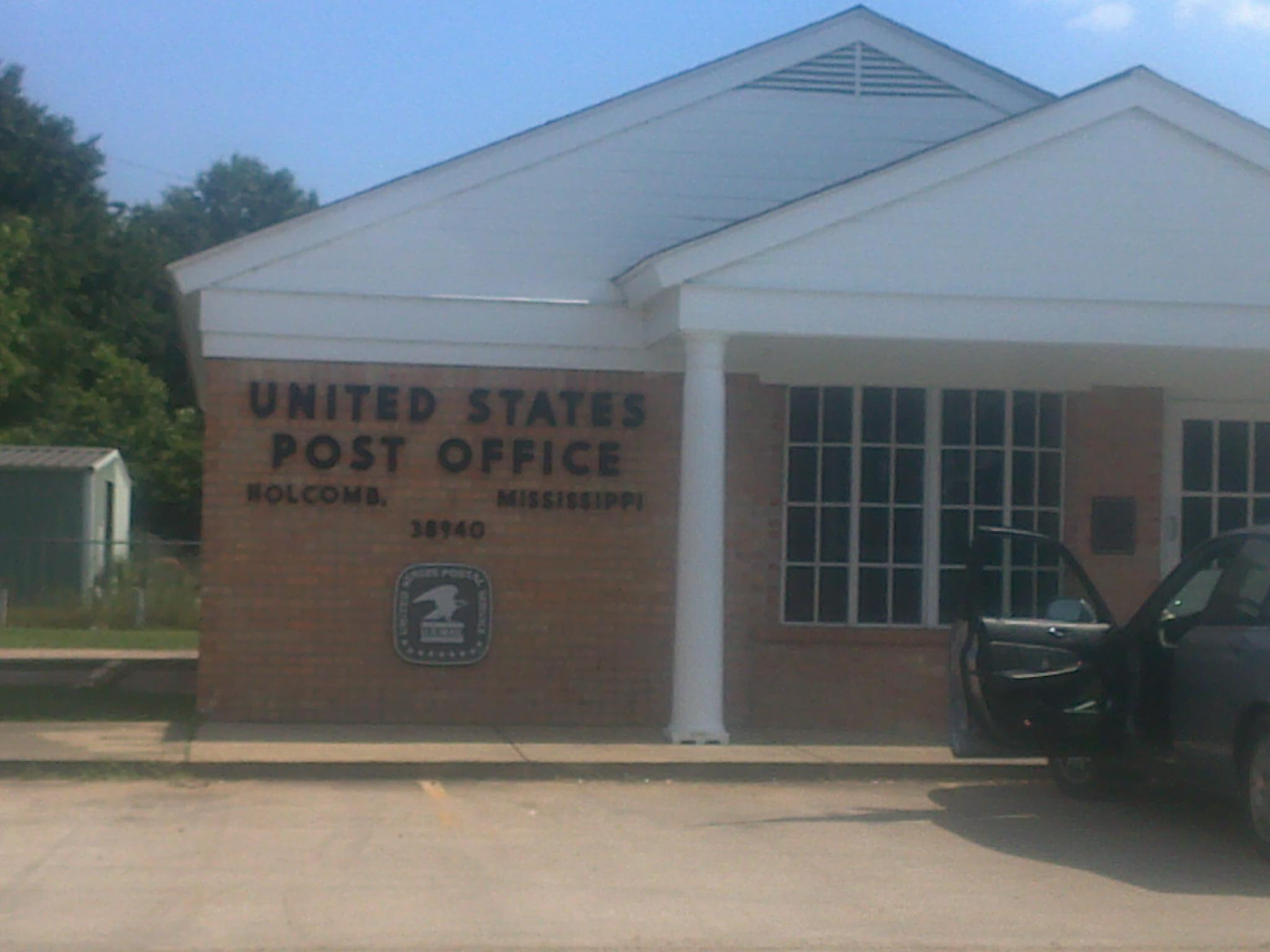
Holcomb Post Office

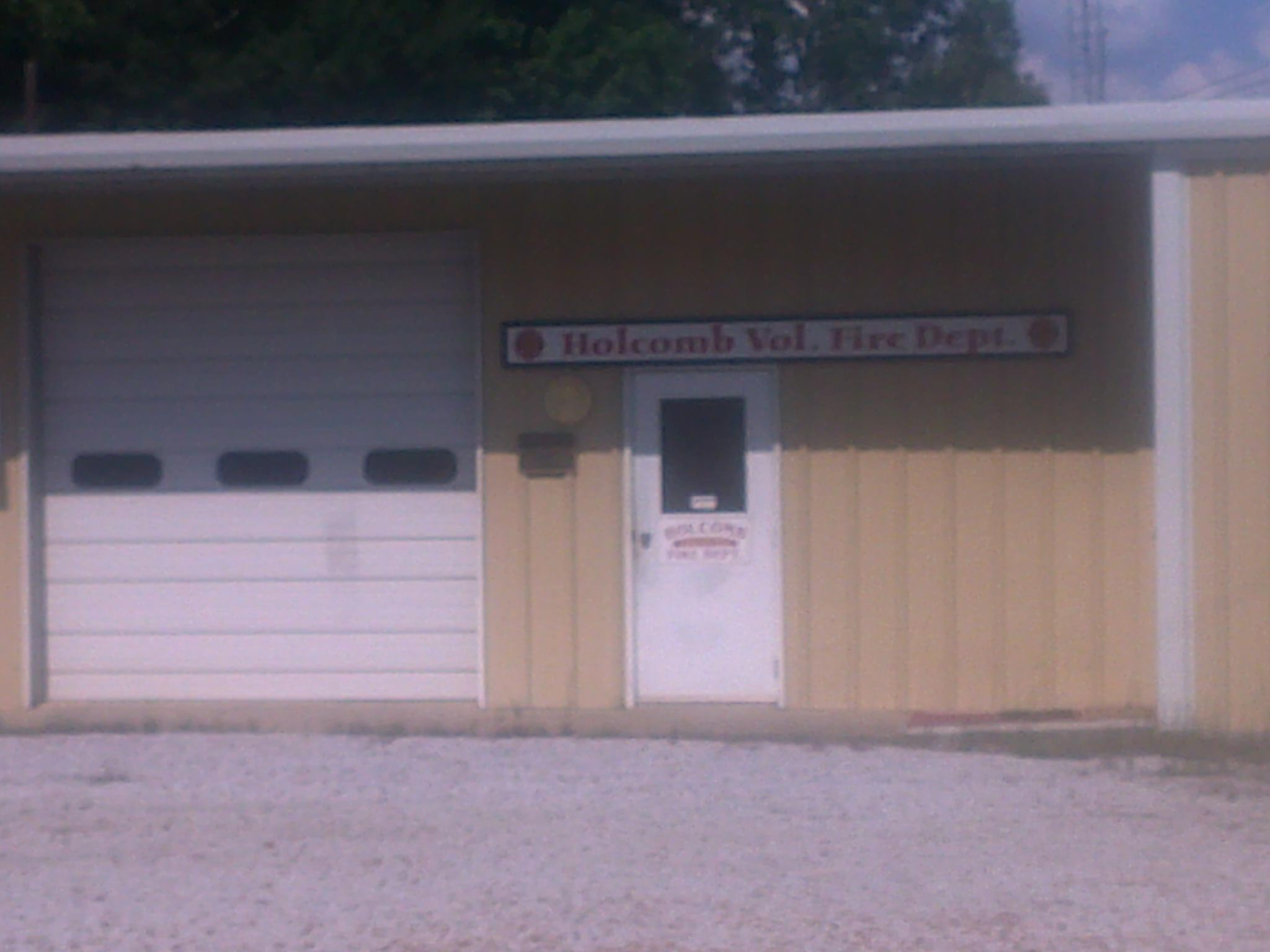
Holcomb Volunteer Fire Department

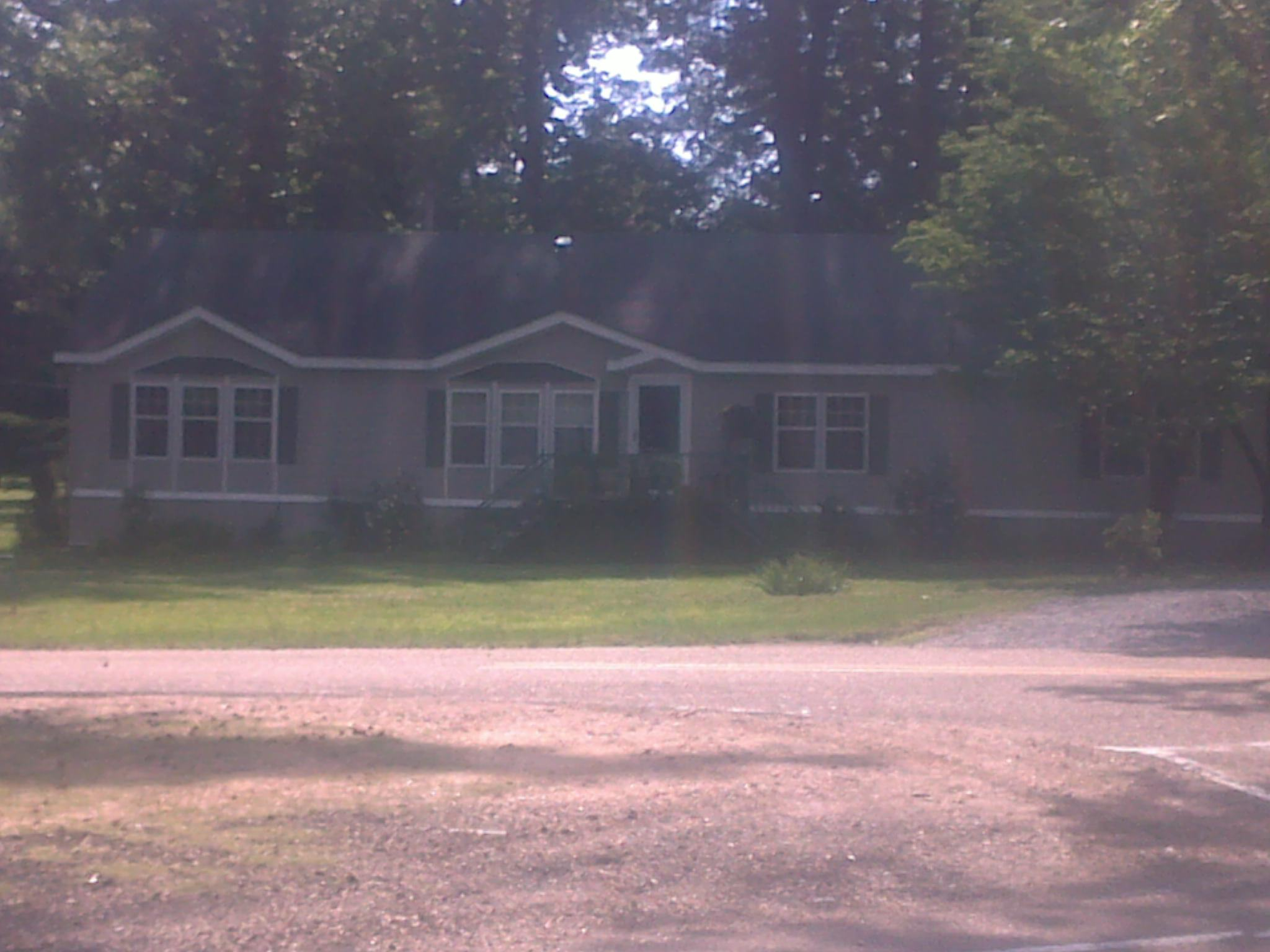
Home in the Holcomb community

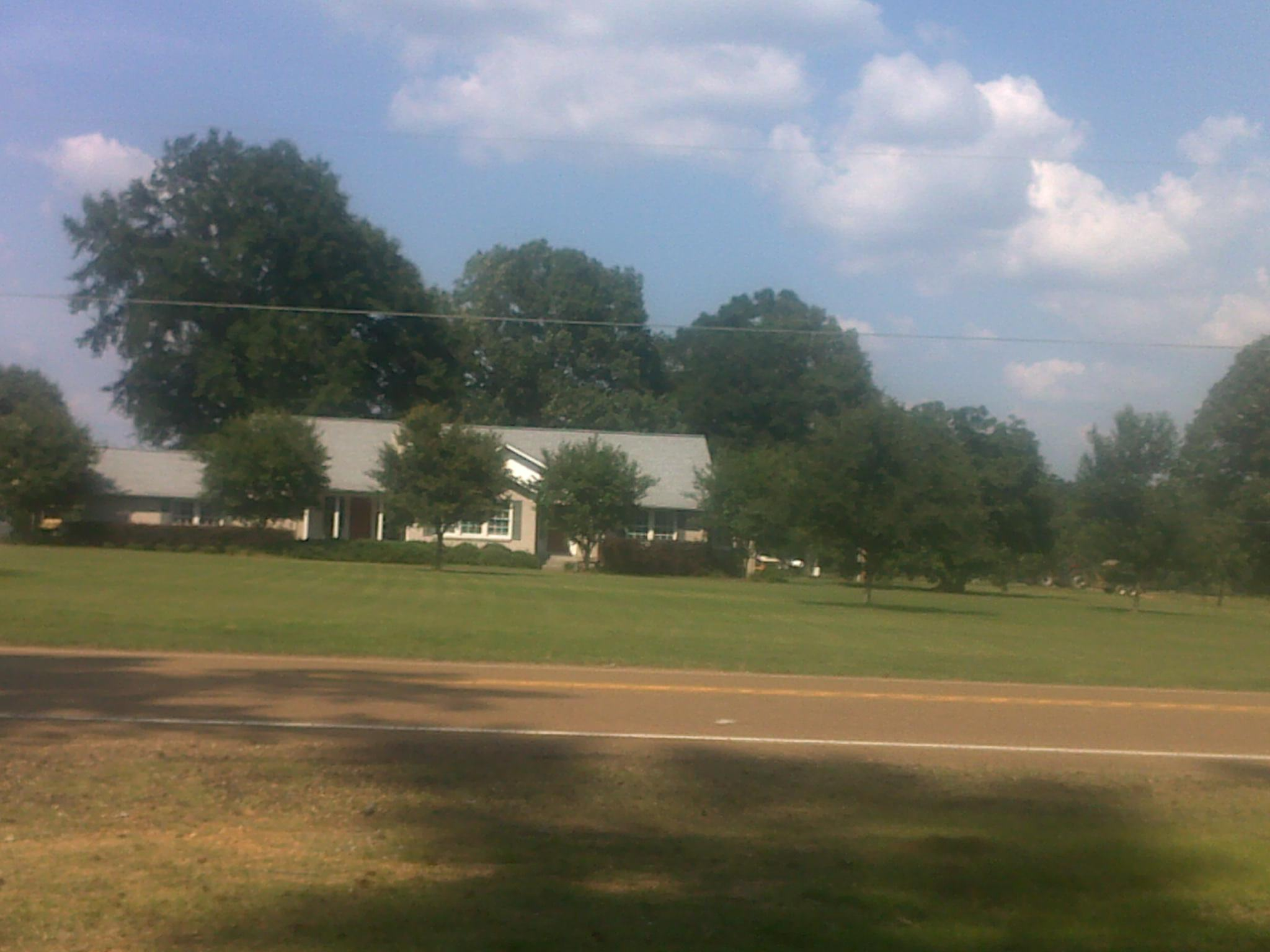
Home in the Holcomb community
