= List of tornadoes in the 2011 Super Outbreak =

List of tornado locations

During April 25–28, 2011, the local weather forecast offices of the National Weather Service confirmed 367 tornadoes in the United States, and Environment Canada confirmed another in Ontario. These tornadoes were part of a major outbreak of tornadoes, the 2011 Super Outbreak, in which 368 tornadoes touched down across 21 states in the Southern, Midwestern, and Northeastern United States and in Ontario, Canada, making it the largest tornado outbreak on record.

As the outbreak developed on April 25, numerous tornadoes touched down across Texas and Arkansas, including an EF3 tornado near Hot Springs Village, Arkansas that caused significant damage and killed one person and a long-track EF2 tornado in the Vilonia, Arkansas area that killed four people and injured 16 others while staying down for over an hour.

April 26 saw mostly weaker tornadoes and no fatalities, with the notable tornadoes of the day being an EF2 tornado that tracked across parts of Texas and into Louisiana and a brief EF3 tornado that struck Campbell Army Airfield, causing $1 million (2011 USD) in damage. From the 27th to early on the 28th, a series of devastating, long-tracked, violent tornadoes killed over 300 people throughout an area extending from Mississippi to Virginia. This included eleven tornadoes rated EF4 and four rated EF5. One particularly devastating and long-lived EF5 wedge tornado tore across northern Alabama, killing 71 people (Note: The initial results claim 72 fatalities, but this was corrected to 71 after one death of a Phil Campbell resident in Hackleburg was mistakenly counted twice.) and devastating several small towns, particularly Hackleburg, Phil Campbell, Tanner, and Harvest. A large, long-tracked EF4 wedge tornado was broadcast live on multiple TV stations as it caused catastrophic damage in densely populated areas of Tuscaloosa and Birmingham, Alabama, killing 64 people.

Numerous other small towns including Smithville, Mississippi; Cordova, Alabama; Rainsville, Alabama; Ohatchee, Alabama; Cullman, Alabama; Trenton, Georgia; Ringgold, Georgia; Apison, Tennessee; and Glade Spring, Virginia sustained devastating, direct hits from intense tornadoes, with several producing death tolls well into the double digits. 319 additional tornado-related deaths occurred within those two days before the outbreak came to an end, bringing the total death toll to 324 from 31 separate tornadoes; 24 other fatalities occurred from separate thunderstorm impacts.

The period from 2:28 p.m. CDT (1928 UTC) to 9:10 p.m. CDT (0210 UTC) represented nearly seven hours of continuous tornado activity during the height of the outbreak of April 27, during which 94 tornadoes touched down. All fifteen violent EF4+ tornadoes occurred continuously during this time, beginning with the Philadelphia, Mississippi EF5 tornado at 2:30 p.m. CDT (1930 UTC) and concluding with the dissipation of the Lake Martin/Dadeville EF4 tornado at 9:09 p.m. CDT (0209 UTC). Several tornadoes from the outbreak were exceptionally long-tracked. Three tornadoes on April 27 travelled over 100 miles (160 km), with a fourth traversing 97 miles (156 km). Seven tornadoes–the Vilonia tornado on April 25 and six tornadoes on April 27–stayed on the ground for over an hour. The long-track Mississppi-Alabama EF4 was down from 2 hours, 53 minutes, the longest duration for a tornado in the outbreak.

The outbreak continued during the overnight and into the morning of April 28, with 47 more tornadoes occurring from Florida to New York. Most of the tornadoes very relatively weak and caused comparatively minor damage. Much of the tornado activity ceased by mid-morning, with only ten tornadoes occurring during the afternoon as the outbreak came to an end.

== Confirmed tornadoes ==
Approximate touchdown location of tornadoes from April 25–28, 2011, with violent EF4+ tornadoes highlighted
Interactive map
- Tornadoes on April 25
- Tornadoes on April 26
- Tornadoes on April 27 (EF0–EF3)
- Tornadoes on April 28
- EF4 tornadoes on April 27
- EF5 tornadoes on April 27
Approximate touchdown location of killer tornadoes in the 2011 Super Outbreak
- EF0 (65–85 mph (104–137 km/h))
- EF1 (86–110 mph (138–177 km/h))
- EF2 (111–135 mph (178–217 km/h))
- EF3 (136–165 mph (218–266 km/h))
- EF4 (166–200 mph (267–322 km/h))
- EF5 (>200 mph (>322 km/h))

State/ Province	Tornadoes confirmed by date/period								Tornadoes confirmed by rating						Total
State/ Province	Tornadoes confirmed by date/period								Enhanced Fujita scale						Total
State/ Province	Early April 25	Late April 25	Early April 26	Late April 26	Early April 27	Late April 27	Early April 28	Late April 28	EF0	EF1	EF2	EF3	EF4	EF5	Total
Alabama	0	0	0	0	36	24	0	0	6	29	9	7	7	2	60
Arkansas	1	17	0	6	0	4	0	0	7	15	5	1	0	0	28
Florida	0	0	0	1	0	0	1	0	1	1	0	0	0	0	2
Georgia	0	0	0	0	1	8	3	1	1	5	2	4	1	0	13
Indiana	0	0	2	0	0	1	0	0	1	1	1	0	0	0	3
Kentucky	0	1	4	5	2	0	0	0	4	6	1	1	0	0	12
Louisiana	0	0	0	10	5	0	0	0	6	6	3	0	0	0	15
Maryland	0	0	0	0	0	3	8	0	10	1	0	0	0	0	11
Michigan	0	0	0	1	0	0	0	0	1	0	0	0	0	0	1
Mississippi	0	0	2	0	21	16	0	0	7	12	10	7	1	2	39
Missouri	0	3	0	0	0	2	0	0	2	3	0	0	0	0	5
New York	0	0	0	2	0	1	6	0	0	7	2	0	0	0	9
North Carolina	0	0	0	1	0	2	2	9	9	5	0	0	0	0	14
Ohio	0	0	0	0	1	0	0	0	1	0	0	0	0	0	1
Oklahoma	0	2	0	1	0	0	0	0	3	0	0	0	0	0	3
Ontario	0	0	0	0	0	1	0	0	1	0	0	0	0	0	1
Pennsylvania	0	0	0	0	0	1	6	0	2	3	2	0	0	0	7
South Carolina	0	0	0	0	0	0	3	0	1	2	0	0	0	0	3
Tennessee	0	2	0	2	33	50	0	0	45	28	10	2	2	0	87
Texas	0	16	1	17	0	0	0	0	25	7	2	0	0	0	34
Virginia	0	0	0	0	0	11	8	0	5	11	2	1	0	0	19
West Virginia	0	0	0	0	0	1	0	0	0	1	0	0	0	0	1
Total	1	41	9	46	99	125	37	10	138	143	49	23	11	4	368
Early = touched down from midnight to noon CDT (0500 to 1700 UTC), Late = touched down from noon to midnight CDT (1700 to 0500 UTC). Tornadoes that cross state or provincial boundaries are only counted once where it initially touched down, even if stronger in another state. The "Total" column at far right is either Date/Period = Total, or Rating = Total; it is not Date/Period + Rating = Total.

=== April 25 event ===
Confirmed tornadoes by Enhanced Fujita rating
EFU	EF0	EF1	EF2	EF3	EF4	EF5	Total
0	17	20	4	1	0	0	42

List of confirmed tornadoes – Monday, April 25, 2011 (Note: All dates are based on the local time zone where the tornado touched down; however, all times are in Coordinated Universal Time and dates are split at midnight CDT for consistency.)
EF#	Location	County / Parish	State	Start Coord.	Time (UTC)	Path length	Max width	Damage (Note: All damage totals are in 2011 USD unless otherwise stated.)
EF0	NE of Fulton	Hempstead	AR	33.6304°N 93.7993°W	1405 – 1413	7.58 mi (12.20 km)	100 yd (91 m)	$0
EF0	Several trees were downed.							
EF0	SE of Bluff Dale	Erath, Hood	TX	32.3341°N 97.9994°W	1855 – 1859	2.51 mi (4.04 km)	150 yd (140 m)	$0
EF0	Several trees were downed.							
EF0	SW of Tolar	Hood	TX	32.3304°N 97.9542°W	1900 – 1901	0.42 mi (680 m)	25 yd (23 m)	$0
EF0	A brief tornado downed several trees.							
EF0	SE of Broken Bow	McCurtain	OK	33.9714°N 94.7912°W	1902 – 1912	9.18 mi (14.77 km)	75 yd (69 m)	$0
EF0	Several trees were downed.							
EF1	NW of Big Fork to SW of Pine Ridge	Polk, Montgomery	AR	34.4975°N 93.9936°W	1955 – 2002	5.82 mi (9.37 km)	50 yd (46 m)	$250,000
EF1	Numerous trees and power lines were downed.							
EF0	WNW of Rainbow	Somervell	TX	32.2803°N 97.7456°W	2000 – 2002	0.78 mi (1.26 km)	50 yd (46 m)	$0
EF0	Several trees were downed west of Comanche Peak Nuclear Power Plant and north of Glen Rose.							
EF0	SW of Cleburne	Johnson	TX	32.2952°N 97.5724°W	2010 – 2013	2.57 mi (4.14 km)	400 yd (370 m)	$0
EF0	Numerous trees were downed north of Cleburne State Park.							
EF0	ENE of Cleburne State Park	Johnson	TX	32.2778°N 97.5066°W	2015 – 2017	0.93 mi (1.50 km)	150 yd (140 m)	$0
EF0	Numerous trees were downed.							
EF1	S of Troup	Cherokee	TX	32.0886°N 95.2134°W	2032 – 2038	8.58 mi (13.81 km)	75 yd (69 m)	$500
EF1	Several trees were downed and a small outbuilding was rolled.							
EF0	SSE of Itasca	Hill	TX	32.1460°N 97.1435°W	2123 – 2124	0.71 mi (1.14 km)	30 yd (27 m)	$0
EF0	A small rope tornado downed several trees.							
EF1	WSW of Pembroke	Christian	KY	36.7579°N 87.4168°W	2123 – 2126	1.5 mi (2.4 km)	275 yd (251 m)	$5,000
EF1	Barns and sheds were destroyed, and trees were downed.							
EF1	NE of Jessieville	Garland, Saline	AR	34.7201°N 93.1026°W	2124 – 2140	9.26 mi (14.90 km)	300 yd (270 m)	$600,000
EF1	Thousands of trees were downed on private timberland, a house suffered severe damage, a garage destroyed, and several outbuildings were damaged in Garland County. In Saline County, more trees were downed.							
EF1	SE of Glenwood to WSW of Pearcy	Pike, Clark, Montgomery, Hot Spring, Garland	AR	34.2911°N 93.5089°W	2135 – 2151	11.6 mi (18.7 km)	800 yd (730 m)	$290,000
EF1	In Pike and Clark Counties, numerous trees were downed. In Montgomery County, trees and power lines were downed, with one tree falling on a house, and the roof was torn off of a barn. The tornado then moved into Hot Spring County, where more trees were downed and outbuildings were damaged, and then into Garland County, where even more trees were downed before the tornado lifted just north of Bonnerdale.							
EF2	NW of Pearcy to N of Rockwell	Garland	AR	34.4540°N 93.3165°W	2156 – 2211	5.87 mi (9.45 km)	200 yd (180 m)	$3,000,000
EF2	This tornado affected areas in and around Sunshine, destroying one site-built house and eight mobile homes, causing major damage to four site-built houses and four mobile homes, and causing minor damage to nineteen site-built houses and nine mobile homes. Numerous outbuildings were destroyed, a travel trailer was pushed onto a car, and hundreds of trees and numerous power lines were downed as well. Nine people were injured.							
EF1	NW of Kirby	Pike	AR	34.2416°N 93.7019°W	2200 – 2207	4.25 mi (6.84 km)	300 yd (270 m)	$200,000
EF1	Part of the second-story was removed from a house, barns and outbuildings were damaged, and numerous trees were downed, with some landing on a house, a mobile home, and a vehicle.							
EF2	SE of Crystal Springs to W of Royal	Garland	AR	34.5066°N 93.3020°W	2202 – 2224	14.44 mi (23.24 km)	300 yd (270 m)	$5,000,000
EF2	Near Bear and Lake Ouachita, the tornado destroyed one site-built house, caused major damage to four site-built houses and three mobile homes, caused minor damage to sixteen site-built houses and nine mobile homes, and affected three site-built houses and one mobile home. A large metal building sustained severe damage, with the roof being torn off and metal girders twisted, a camping trailer was blown into a field and destroyed, and several outbuildings were destroyed. Hundreds of trees and numerous power lines were downed as well. Ten people were injured.							
EF0	Northern Eagletown	McCurtain	OK	34.0454°N 94.5812°W	2218 – 2221	2.51 mi (4.04 km)	50 yd (46 m)	$5,000
EF0	A convenience store sustained roof and awning damage, and trees were downed on the north side of town.							
EF0	Western Avalon	Ellis	TX	32.2055°N 96.7985°W	2220 – 2221	0.46 mi (0.74 km)	50 yd (46 m)	$25,000
EF0	An elementary school suffered partial roof loss, and a residence sustained minor roof damage.							
EF0	SE of Horatio	Little River, Sevier	AR	33.9026°N 94.4111°W	2237 – 2245	7.37 mi (11.86 km)	70 yd (64 m)	$0
EF0	Multiple trees were downed.							
EF1	SSW of Silva to W of Lowndes	Wayne	MO	37.1278°N 90.5339°W	2247 – 2300	11.78 mi (18.96 km)	200 yd (180 m)	$25,000
EF1	The side of a church was damaged, and dozens of oak and pine trees were downed.							
EF1	WSW of Clubb to S of Cascade	Wayne	MO	37.2112°N 90.3706°W	2258 – 2306	5.88 mi (9.46 km)	500 yd (460 m)	$70,000
EF1	At a horse ranch near Clubb, wall panels were lifted from a horse arena, a segment of roofing was removed from a house, and a 111-year-old barn was heavily damaged. Tin panels from the arena were thrown about 200 yards (180 m) away. Elsewhere, many trees were downed.							
EF3	N of Hot Springs National Park to SW of Paron	Garland, Saline	AR	34.5903°N 93.0390°W	2307 – 2330	16.78 mi (27.00 km)	300 yd (270 m)	$23,000,000
EF3	1 death – This strong tornado traveled through Garland and Saline Counties, causing heavy damage in and around Ozark Lithia, Fountain Lake, and Hot Springs Village. In Garland County, 25 houses and 21 mobile homes were destroyed, 22 houses and 5 mobile homes suffered severe damage, 18 houses and 4 mobile homes had minor damage, and 5 houses and 2 mobile homes were just slightly affected. A two-story house had its top floor removed, several outbuildings and a well-constructed barn were destroyed, church buildings were badly damaged, and vehicles were piled up in the parking lot of the church. In Saline County, thousands of trees were downed, with more than 100 houses suffering damage from the falling trees, and a cell phone tower was blown down. Boats and docks were destroyed on a lake as well. Twenty additional people were injured.							
EF1	SSW of Perryville to NE of Perryville	Perry	AR	34.9522°N 92.8326°W	2321 – 2333	5.95 mi (9.58 km)	300 yd (270 m)	$700,000
EF1	Several buildings had their roofs torn off and thrown into adjacent fields and several hay barns were destroyed at Heifer International's ranch. Elsewhere, several houses had minor to major roof damage, barns and outbuildings were damaged, and numerous trees and power lines were downed, with several vehicles being badly damaged by falling trees.							
EF1	S of Delight	Pike	AR	33.9666°N 93.5451°W	2329 – 2332	4.15 mi (6.68 km)	250 yd (230 m)	$100,000
EF1	Numerous trees were downed, one of which fell on and damaged the cab of a tractor-trailer.							
EF1	W of Sedgewickville	Bollinger	MO	37.4893°N 89.9587°W	2330 – 2333	2.77 mi (4.46 km)	70 yd (64 m)	$200,000
EF1	A house had half of its roof torn off, and a mobile home was thrown into a shed, with both being destroyed. A power pole was snapped, and dozens of trees were downed as well. A woman was found trapped inside the destroyed mobile home but was rescued without injury.							
EF1	SW of Wye	Pulaski	AR	34.8767°N 92.6957°W	2348 – 2352	1.64 mi (2.64 km)	400 yd (370 m)	$250,000
EF1	A tornado west of Lake Maumelle and south of Wye Mountain downed many trees, with one tree falling on a vehicle and another on a tractor. Fences were knocked down and outbuildings were damaged as well.							
EF2	N of Pleasant Hill to Vilonia to N of Joy	Pulaski, Faulkner, White	AR	34.8057°N 92.6075°W	2348 – 0059	51.32 mi (82.59 km)	2,886 yd (2,639 m)	$53,405,000
EF2	4 deaths – See section on this tornado – 16 additional people were injured.							
EF0	NE of Coolidge	Limestone	TX	31.7923°N 96.6370°W	2353 – 2356	1.32 mi (2.12 km)	100 yd (91 m)	$0
EF0	Several trees were downed.							
EF0	NW of Wortham	Freestone	TX	31.7919°N 96.4904°W	2359 – 0001	0.82 mi (1.32 km)	100 yd (91 m)	$0
EF0	Several trees were downed.							
EF1	N of Wooster	Faulkner	AR	35.2053°N 92.4738°W	0006 – 0008	1.1 mi (1.8 km)	50 yd (46 m)	$100,000
EF1	Numerous trees and a few power lines were downed, with several houses suffering roof damage from falling trees. One house had a gutter ripped off and one of the eaves damaged by a falling tree.							
EF0	NE of Teague	Freestone	TX	31.6882°N 96.2460°W	0025 – 0030	3.48 mi (5.60 km)	500 yd (460 m)	$0
EF0	Several trees were downed southwest of Fairfield.							
EF0	E of Oakwood	Leon	TX	31.5904°N 95.8242°W	0035 – 0037	0.95 mi (1.53 km)	100 yd (91 m)	$0
EF0	Several trees were downed.							
EF2	Jacksonville	Pulaski	AR	34.8720°N 92.1702°W	0046 – 0054	5.17 mi (8.32 km)	350 yd (320 m)	$125,000,000
EF2	Much of the tornado's path was through the Little Rock Air Force Base, where at least five aircraft were damaged, three severely, several buildings in the base shopping area and flight line area were damaged, some with roofs being torn off, and the fire station lost its roof and had its doors buckled. Cars were overturned in the parking lot of the Base Exchange shopping center, more than 135 houses in the base housing area were either damaged or destroyed, and a toilet from one house was found a 1/2 mile (0.80 km) away lodged in the roof of the Base Exchange. Elsewhere, the auditorium at North Pulaski High School had its roof torn off and one wall collapsed, and the Chemistry building had a wall collapsed, weakening the roof. Four people were injured, all at the air base.							
EF1	W of England to SSE of Carlisle	Pulaski, Lonoke	AR	34.5281°N 92.0547°W	0053 – 0114	21.94 mi (35.31 km)	800 yd (730 m)	$390,000
EF1	A few trees were downed and much of the roof was removed from a barn in Pulaski County, before the tornado moved into Lonoke County east-southeast of Wampoo. There, power poles were snapped, a farm fertilizer truck and a grain trailer were flipped over, and barns and outbuildings were damaged. Falling trees caused roof damage to several houses in England as well.							
EF1	SE of Hickory Plains	Prairie	AR	34.9309°N 91.7342°W	0115 – 0122	6.22 mi (10.01 km)	100 yd (91 m)	$25,000
EF1	A mobile home was knocked off its foundation, shingles were blown off a few houses, and numerous trees were downed.							
EF1	SW of Beebe to SE of McRae	White	AR	35.0511°N 91.9398°W	0124 – 0133	8.87 mi (14.27 km)	100 yd (91 m)	$1,000,000
EF1	Hundreds of trees and many power lines were downed, and many houses in Beebe received roof damage, either directly from wind or from fallen trees. Several outbuildings lost their roofs, and a few school buildings sustained roof damage, and a few cars were crushed by falling trees as well.							
EF1	WSW of Crockett	Houston	TX	31.2954°N 95.5022°W	0215 – 0218	0.2 mi (320 m)	30 yd (27 m)	$50,000
EF1	An unoccupied mobile home was destroyed and several others were damaged. Numerous trees were downed as well.							
EF1	NW of Lufkin	Cherokee, Angelina	TX	31.4568°N 95.0273°W	0237 – 0304	7.72 mi (12.42 km)	250 yd (230 m)	$400,000
EF1	A high-end EF1 touched down just north of the Neches River, where it caused roof damage to a house and downed several trees before moving into Angelina County. There, a few outbuildings were destroyed, several homes suffered roof damage, and other homes and outbuildings were damaged. Many trees were downed as well.							
EF1	SW of Centralia	Trinity	TX	31.2257°N 95.0749°W	0245 – 0250	0.64 mi (1.03 km)	100 yd (91 m)	$30,000
EF1	Many trees were downed at the Davy Crockett National Forest.							
EF0	NW of Lufkin	Angelina	TX	31.3924°N 94.7956°W	0313 – 0315	0.67 mi (1.08 km)	25 yd (23 m)	$2,000
EF0	A mobile home and a site-built home sustained roof damage, and many trees were downed.							
EF1	NE of Martin, TN to SW of Lynnville, KY	Weakley (TN), Graves (KY)	TN, KY	36.3961°N 88.8048°W	0445 – 0503	15.39 mi (24.77 km)	225 yd (206 m)	$150,000
EF1	An open hay barn was partially destroyed, a house sustained major damage, and many trees were downed in Weakley County. After crossing the state line into Graves County, the tornado destroyed a gazebo and a playhouse, caused major damage to a garage, impaled grape vines into the roof of a porch, and impaled a stick into the side of a house. It also downed many trees before dissipating.							
EF0	NW of Lexington to ESE of Clarksburg	Henderson, Carroll	TN	35.7116°N 88.5085°W	0447 – 0503	16.98 mi (27.33 km)	200 yd (180 m)	$15,000
EF0	This weak tornado caused roof damage to a home, destroyed a storage shed, and downed numerous trees and power lines as it moved near Wildersville in Henderson County. It continued into Carroll County, where it downed trees in the Natchez Trace State Park before dissipating.							

=== April 26 event ===
Confirmed tornadoes by Enhanced Fujita rating
EFU	EF0	EF1	EF2	EF3	EF4	EF5	Total
0	31	19	4	1	0	0	55

List of confirmed tornadoes – Tuesday, April 26, 2011
EF#	Location	County / Parish	State	Start Coord.	Time (UTC)	Path length	Max width	Damage
EF0	ENE of Onalaska	Polk	TX	30.8333°N 95.0827°W	0530	0.1 mi (160 m)	20 yd (18 m)	$1,000
EF0	This brief tornado caused minor damage at Walkers Waterfront.							
EF0	S of Wadesboro	Calloway	KY	36.7178°N 88.3136°W	0530 – 0531	0.76 mi (1.22 km)	175 yd (160 m)	$80,000
EF0	A brief tornado crushed a metal frame building, caused varying degrees of roof damage to a few buildings, and downed numerous trees.							
EF1	S of Kuttawa	Lyon	KY	37.0444°N 88.1521°W	0537 – 0542	3.2 mi (5.1 km)	50 yd (46 m)	$150,000
EF1	Substantial damage occurred to a marina at Lake Barkley, where boat docks were damaged and a boat was capsized. A home sustained roof damage, and several trees were downed as well.							
EF1	NW of Eddyville to NE of Fredonia	Lyon, Caldwell	KY	37.0756°N 88.1021°W	0540 – 0559	15.44 mi (24.85 km)	100 yd (91 m)	$200,000
EF1	This intermittent tornado damaged barns, ripped shingles off of roofs, and downed trees in Lyon County. In Caldwell County, a carport and a barn were destroyed, homes and barns sustained varying degrees of roof damage, and several trees and power poles were downed.							
EF3	Campbell Army Airfield	Christian	KY	36.6625°N 87.5071°W	0605 – 0608	2.57 mi (4.14 km)	300 yd (270 m)	$1,000,000
EF3	This intense tornado struck the Campbell Army Airfield at Fort Campbell, destroying one building and causing heavy damage to several others, all of which were large and well-constructed. Large doors were blown in on these buildings as well. Several other smaller buildings received minor to major damage, and numerous heavy vehicles were damaged, with at least three being flipped over. Immediately north of the airfield, across farmland, several dozen trees were downed, two barns were heavily damaged, three power poles were blown down, and some shingles were blown off of a house.							
EF2	S of Greenbrier	Warrick	IN	38.1102°N 87.3017°W	0702 – 0705	4.53 mi (7.29 km)	300 yd (270 m)	$90,000
EF2	One barn was destroyed, with debris being thrown 50 to 75 yards (46 to 69 m), and another barn was damaged. Several homes sustained roof damage, either directly from the wind or from falling trees. Three power poles were snapped and many trees were downed as well.							
EF1	Spurgeon	Pike	IN	38.2470°N 87.2612°W	0709 – 0710	0.54 mi (0.87 km)	225 yd (206 m)	$110,000
EF1	Several homes in Spurgeon sustained minor roof damage, a barn was damaged, with debris being carried a couple hundred yards, and a small building was destroyed. Numerous trees were downed as well.							
EF1	ESE of Collins	Covington	MS	31.6250°N 89.5264°W	1141 – 1142	0.31 mi (500 m)	50 yd (46 m)	$45,000
EF1	This brief tornado destroyed two barns, with one's concrete foundation being pulled out of the ground, caused minor damage to a FEMA trailer, and pulled skirting away from another trailer. A few trees were downed as well.							
EF1	NW of Laurel	Jones	MS	31.6996°N 89.2415°W	1212 – 1214	1.17 mi (1.88 km)	100 yd (91 m)	$180,000
EF1	Several houses were damaged, one of which sustained major roof damage. The roof of an outbuilding was blown off, a trampoline and a carport were thrown considerable distances, and a fence around a pool was blown down. Several trees were downed as well.							
EF0	SW of Williamston	Martin	NC	35.8268°N 77.0917°W	1815 – 1817	0.11 mi (180 m)	30 yd (27 m)	$500
EF0	This brief, weak tornado downed trees and power lines and damaged the roof and siding of a house.							
EF0	W of Needmore	Bailey	TX	34.0300°N 102.7999°W	1840 – 1844	0.75 mi (1.21 km)	50 yd (46 m)	$0
EF0	This was a weak landspout tornado that caused no damage.							
EF1	Verona Mills	Oneida	NY	43.2000°N 75.5700°W	2020 – 2023	0.86 mi (1.38 km)	65 yd (59 m)	$5,000
EF1	This brief tornado in a wooded area snapped a power pole and downed numerous trees.							
EF0	N of Burnips	Allegan	MI	42.7384°N 85.8338°W	2144 – 2157	3.32 mi (5.34 km)	50 yd (46 m)	$1,000,000
EF0	This tornado touched down at a landscaping company, where it tore a small section of the roof of a warehouse building, knocked over several trailers, and blew the windows out of several cars. It then struck a row of 100-yard-long (91 m) pole barns used to house turkeys. About a 100-foot (30 m) section of one barn was uplifted and collapsed, and a 50-foot (15 m) section of the roof of another barn was torn off. The tornado continued northeast, destroying several small outbuildings, causing minor roof and soffit damage to several houses, damaging two garage doors, and uprooting several trees. It then destroyed a 75-year-old 40-by-90-foot (12 by 27 m) barn.							
EF0	W of Mabank	Kaufman	TX	32.3655°N 96.2048°W	2156 – 2203	5.07 mi (8.16 km)	500 yd (460 m)	$5,000
EF0	This tornado developed on the northwest bank of the Cedar Creek Reservoir and downed many trees, especially around a golf course, before dissipating northwest of Mabank.							
EF1	SW of Coy to N of Humnoke	Lonoke	AR	34.5273°N 91.9124°W	2214 – 2232	8.31 mi (13.37 km)	800 yd (730 m)	$1,750,000
EF1	Grain bins were destroyed, irrigation pivots were overturned, and much of the roof was torn off of a large farm shop. A tractor-trailer was overturned on US 165, and trees and power poles were downed, with one tree falling onto a house.							
EF1	S of Ben Wheeler to E of Garden Valley	Van Zandt, Smith	TX	32.4313°N 95.7028°W	2245 – 2320	13.87 mi (22.32 km)	880 yd (800 m)	$200,000
EF1	In Van Zandt County, this large tornado rolled a mobile home was rolled onto its side, inflicted minor damage to several homes, and inflicted major damage to a church. The tornado downed multiple trees in Smith County before dissipating. One person sustained minor injuries in the rolled mobile home in Van Zandt County.							
EF0	WSW of Moffett	Sequoyah	OK	35.3606°N 94.5074°W	2246	0.1 mi (160 m)	50 yd (46 m)	$0
EF0	This brief tornado over open country caused no damage.							
EF0	SSE of Van Buren	Crawford	AR	35.4200°N 94.3430°W	2255	0.2 mi (320 m)	75 yd (69 m)	$0
EF0	This brief tornado was caught on camera; it remained over open country and caused no damage.							
EF0	Mabank	Kaufman	TX	32.3666°N 96.1644°W	2301 – 2311	5.07 mi (8.16 km)	400 yd (370 m)	$30,000
EF0	This cone tornado developed west of Mabank over the Cedar Creek Reservoir and tracked due east into downtown Mabank. Homes and businesses sustained roof damage, and trees and power lines were downed.							
EF0	WNW of Port St. Lucie	St. Lucie	FL	27.3068°N 80.4201°W	2305	0.056 mi (90 m)	15 yd (14 m)	$0
EF0	A brief landspout tornado touched down in an agricultural area and caused no damage.							
EF0	N of Elaine, AR to SE of Dundee, MS	Phillips (AR), Coahoma (MS), Tunica (MS)	AR, MS	34.3348°N 90.8408°W	2310 – 2348	27.92 mi (44.93 km)	200 yd (180 m)	$92,000
EF0	This weak, but long-tracked tornado downed trees and power lines and blew over road signs as it moved into Coahoma County, back into Phillips County, then again moved into Coahoma County near Friars Point, Coahoma, and Lula, crossing the Mississippi River three times. In Coahoma County, several homes and a church sustained roof damage, one home was moved off of the block foundation, and a commercial metal storage building had a large section of its roof peeled off. Trees, power poles, and road signs were downed as well before the tornado continued into Tunica County. There, it downed more trees and power lines and overturned an irrigation pivot before dissipating.							
EF0	E of Mabank	Van Zandt	TX	32.3896°N 95.9557°W	2323 – 2325	1.02 mi (1.64 km)	100 yd (91 m)	$0
EF0	This weak tornado northeast of Purtis Creek State Park downed several trees.							
EF0	NNW of Ferguson, AR to Coahoma, MS	Phillips (AR), Coahoma (MS)	AR, MS	34.1370°N 90.9843°W	2329 – 0002	30.78 mi (49.54 km)	200 yd (180 m)	$75,000
EF0	This weak, but long-tracked tornado downed some trees before crossing into Coahoma County, where a church sustained roof damage, a few road and advertisement signs were damaged, irrigation pivots were knocked over, and numerous trees and several power poles were downed.							
EF1	ESE of Enola to SW of Joy	Faulkner, White	AR	35.1784°N 92.1565°W	2332 – 2348	12.88 mi (20.73 km)	200 yd (180 m)	$40,000
EF1	Many trees were downed, with one damaging the roof of a house. This tornado tracked across some of the same areas that had been hit by the Vilonia EF2 tornado the previous day.							
EF1	SSW of Stewart to NE of Tatum	Rusk, Panola, Harrison	TX	32.2848°N 94.6580°W	2335 – 2354	13.86 mi (22.31 km)	100 yd (91 m)	$10,000
EF1	In Rusk County, a storage outbuilding was destroyed and many trees were downed. The tornado moved into Panola County north-northeast of Tatum and downed several trees before continuing into Harrison County, where it downed several more trees before dissipating.							
EF0	WNW of Hawkins	Wood	TX	32.6302°N 95.3479°W	0000 – 0005	3.38 mi (5.44 km)	50 yd (46 m)	$0
EF0	Multiple trees were snapped just north of US 80.							
EF2	SSE of Marshall	Harrison	TX	32.4312°N 94.3534°W	0004 – 0014	5.18 mi (8.34 km)	400 yd (370 m)	$300,000
EF2	One house completely lost its roof, another had an entire room destroyed, and a third had its metal roof peeled off and partial wall failure. Many trees were downed as well.							
EF0	NNE of Corsicana	Navarro	TX	32.1756°N 96.4225°W	0015 – 0016	0.44 mi (710 m)	100 yd (91 m)	$0
EF0	A few trees were downed.							
EF1	NW of Wickes	Polk	AR	34.3003°N 94.3442°W	0017 – 0019	0.77 mi (1.24 km)	50 yd (46 m)	$20,000
EF1	A house had its porch and part of its roof blown off, much of the roof was blown off a mobile home, and several trees were downed.							
EF2	Tar Hill	Grayson, Hardin	KY	37.5550°N 86.2394°W	0018 – 0022	3.01 mi (4.84 km)	440 yd (400 m)	Unknown
EF2	A single-wide mobile home and numerous barns and outbuildings were destroyed, with siding being thrown 500 yards (460 m), farm equipment was thrown 50 yards (46 m), a new 24-foot (7.3 m) travel trailer was destroyed, and fifteen homes sustained major roof damage as the tornado moved through and to the east of Tar Hill. Many trees were downed along the path.							
EF0	SW of Tar Hill	Grayson	KY	37.5542°N 86.2364°W	0019 – 0020	0.28 mi (450 m)	60 yd (55 m)	Unknown
EF0	A brief tornado from a secondary circulation occurred just south of the previous tornado, downing several trees and power lines.							
EF0	N of Jonesville	Harrison	TX	32.4959°N 94.1545°W	0024 – 0034	5.96 mi (9.59 km)	70 yd (64 m)	$0
EF0	Many trees were downed sporadically along the path northwest of Waskom.							
EF0	S of Benton	Bossier	LA	32.6377°N 93.7481°W	0034 – 0039	3.59 mi (5.78 km)	50 yd (46 m)	$0
EF0	Tree limbs were snapped and whole trees were downed.							
EF1	Groesbeck	Limestone	TX	31.5313°N 96.5381°W	0035 – 0040	0.92 mi (1.48 km)	75 yd (69 m)	$150,000
EF1	The courthouse, the fire department, and about 40 businesses were damaged, the steeple was torn off a church, and cars and buildings had windows busted by flying debris. Trees and power poles were downed as well.							
EF2	ESE of Deadwood, TX to Frierson to Lake Bistineau State Park, LA	Panola (TX), DeSoto (LA), Caddo (LA), Bossier (LA)	TX, LA	32.0988°N 94.0643°W	0046 – 0139	42.37 mi (68.19 km)	850 yd (780 m)	$10,025,000
EF2	This long-lived wedge tornado touched down just inside Panola County and downed several trees before crossing into DeSoto Parish and through Gloster and Frierson, where three dozen homes sustained minor damage and several more sustained moderate damage. Several barns and carports were destroyed, two tanks from a gas well were overturned, and many trees and power lines were downed, with many trees falling onto houses. The tornado continued into Caddo Parish and downed several pecan trees before moving into Bossier Parish. There, a mobile trailer was flipped at a gas well, and trees and power lines were downed before the tornado dissipated over Lake Bistineau. Two people were injured, both in the flipped trailer in Bossier Parish.							
EF0	WNW of Donie	Limestone	TX	31.5003°N 96.3661°W	0048 – 0049	0.68 mi (1.09 km)	100 yd (91 m)	$0
EF0	Several trees were downed by this brief tornado.							
EF0	NW of Tyler	Smith	TX	32.3750°N 95.3216°W	0049 – 0054	3.18 mi (5.12 km)	60 yd (55 m)	$0
EF0	Multiple trees were downed.							
EF1	ENE of Glendale	Hardin	KY	37.6119°N 85.8667°W	0053 – 0054	0.72 mi (1.16 km)	175 yd (160 m)	Unknown
EF1	This brief tornado crossed I-65 and US 31W and moved through the Hardin County Fairgrounds, hitting a large livestock barn and the fairground's restaurant. The restaurant's roof was thrown and landed on top of a livestock barn, and metal siding was thrown 250 yards (230 m). A house sustained roof damage, and several trees and power lines were downed as well.							
EF0	S of Cobb	Caldwell	KY	36.9583°N 87.7700°W	0106	0.31 mi (500 m)	50 yd (46 m)	$0
EF0	This brief, weak tornado downed a few trees and tree limbs.							
EF0	N of Toone	Hardeman	TN	35.3815°N 88.9926°W	0127 – 0130	1.47 mi (2.37 km)	150 yd (140 m)	$15,000
EF0	Several trees were downed, and the tin roof on a home was peeled back.							
EF0	NNE of Lacy-Lakeview	McLennan	TX	31.6906°N 97.0420°W	0128 – 0130	0.38 mi (610 m)	50 yd (46 m)	$0
EF0	Several trees were downed.							
EF1	NE of Mount Upton to NE of Gilbertsville	Otsego	NY	42.4320°N 75.3640°W	0135 – 0145	4.84 mi (7.79 km)	150 yd (140 m)	$100,000
EF1	The athletic fields at Gilbertsville-Mount Upton Central School were damaged, with metal bleachers being blown several hundred yards, a press box being torn off steel beams, and a railroad tie used in a parking lot being hurled over 100 yards (91 m) into a fence. Metal poles used for hanging netting were broke, and a soccer goal was bent back. The fields were littered with small tree debris. Additionally, a portable toilet was carried about a 1/2 mile (0.80 km), and other light material was carried up to one mile (1.6 km) away. Numerous trees were downed along the entire path.							
EF0	NNW of Mart	McLennan	TX	31.5763°N 96.8648°W	0153 – 0154	1.47 mi (2.37 km)	100 yd (91 m)	$0
EF0	Several trees were downed by this small rope tornado.							
EF1	S of Sibley to N of Dubberly	Webster	LA	32.4940°N 93.2950°W	0154 – 0157	6.49 mi (10.44 km)	150 yd (140 m)	$100,000
EF1	This tornado touched down south of Sibley before moving between Sibley and Dubberly and dissipating north of Dubberly. Several homes sustained roof damage, and numerous trees were downed. This tornado was spawned by the same supercell that produced the 0046 UTC long-track EF2 tornado.							
EF0	ESE of Henderson to ENE of Jacks Creek	Chester	TN	35.4285°N 88.5879°W	0154 – 0203	8.23 mi (13.24 km)	25 yd (23 m)	$75,000
EF0	This small, weak tornado downed many trees, one of which fell onto a mobile home. A couple other structures sustained roof damage, and power lines were knocked down as well.							
EF0	NE of Mortons Gap	Hopkins	KY	37.2505°N 87.4543°W	0200	0.2 mi (320 m)	50 yd (46 m)	$2,000
EF0	This very brief tornado downed tree limbs and small signs.							
EF1	WNW of Quitman to SW of Grambling	Bienville	LA	32.3701°N 92.8346°W	0225 – 0232	5.27 mi (8.48 km)	100 yd (91 m)	$0
EF1	This tornado downed multiple trees.							
EF0	SE of Grambling	Jackson, Lincoln	LA	32.4376°N 92.6858°W	0231 – 0241	5.98 mi (9.62 km)	80 yd (73 m)	$0
EF0	Several trees were downed.							
EF1	SSW of Junction City, LA to NNE of Lawson, AR	Claiborne (LA), Union (LA), Union (AR)	LA, AR	32.9300°N 92.7700°W	0245 – 0315	26.52 mi (42.68 km)	100 yd (91 m)	$20,000
EF1	Several trees were downed in Claiborne Parish and in Union Parish by this tornado before it moved into Union County, Arkansas north of Randolph, where six houses sustained minor damage in Lawson, and several more trees were downed.							
EF0	N of Eros to Calhoun	Jackson, Ouachita	LA	32.4667°N 92.4302°W	0250 – 0256	5.21 mi (8.38 km)	70 yd (64 m)	$0
EF0	Many trees and several power lines were downed.							
EF0	SSE of Thornton	Limestone	TX	31.3529°N 96.5615°W	0257 – 0258	0.74 mi (1.19 km)	100 yd (91 m)	$0
EF0	A few trees were downed.							
EF0	NW of Swartz	Ouachita	LA	32.5782°N 91.9948°W	0333 – 0339	1.88 mi (3.03 km)	50 yd (46 m)	$200
EF0	Several trees were downed, and shingles were torn off of a home.							
EF0	W of Bastrop	Morehouse	LA	32.7600°N 91.9700°W	0344 – 0346	2.46 mi (3.96 km)	75 yd (69 m)	$20,000
EF0	A few homes sustained minor roof damage, and several trees were downed.							
EF1	ENE of Alabama Landing, LA to SE of Crossett, AR	Morehouse (LA), Ashley (AR)	LA, AR	32.9086°N 91.9993°W	0345 – 0405	12.03 mi (19.36 km)	440 yd (400 m)	$360,000
EF1	This tornado downed trees, damaged crops and a mobile home, and caused roof damage to a few structures. One person was injured, with the injury occurring in Morehouse Parish.							
EF1	Hall Summit	Red River	LA	32.1878°N 93.3254°W	0355 – 0356	3.52 mi (5.66 km)	125 yd (114 m)	$150,000
EF1	This low-end EF1 tornado destroyed two barns, caused minor to moderate roof damage to several houses, and downed several trees as it moved from west of Hall Summit, through town, and to the east.							

=== April 27 event ===
Confirmed tornadoes by Enhanced Fujita rating
EFU	EF0	EF1	EF2	EF3	EF4	EF5	Total
0	72*	81	36	20	11	4	224

* – One tornado touched down in Ontario, Canada and was rated as an F0. It is counted as an EF0 in this table.

List of confirmed tornadoes – Wednesday, April 27, 2011
EF#	Location	County / Parish	State	Start Coord.	Time (UTC)	Path length	Max width	Damage
EF2	Darnell to Bowie	West Carroll, East Carroll	LA	32.6700°N 91.4400°W	0503 – 0517	10.99 mi (17.69 km)	880 yd (800 m)	$650,000
EF2	Eight power poles were snapped, and several sheds/barns had roof damage, with two being destroyed; two grain storage bins were severely damaged, and the fire department building in Bowie sustained siding damage. Numerous trees were downed as well.							
EF2	Zwolle to N of Many	Sabine	LA	31.6199°N 93.6951°W	0527 – 0543	17.45 mi (28.08 km)	300 yd (270 m)	$1,000,000
EF2	A 200-foot-high (61 m) communication tower was bent to the ground, two homes and a shed were destroyed, several other homes sustained roof damage (a few of which had their roofs peeled back), and several trees were downed.							
EF0	Cary	Sharkey	MS	32.7788°N 90.9380°W	0535 – 0537	2.24 mi (3.60 km)	100 yd (91 m)	$15,000
EF0	A couple of homes had shingles torn off, a tractor shed lost a large section of tin roofing, and a few trees and large tree limbs were downed in and just south of Cary.							
EF1	NE of Many to E of Robeline	Sabine, Natchitoches	LA	31.6170°N 93.4060°W	0542 – 0550	12.66 mi (20.37 km)	880 yd (800 m)	$2,000,000
EF1	A multiple-vortex tornado damaged many homes and tossed/flipped carports in Natchitoches Parish. Many trees were downed as well, with several falling on homes and cars.							
EF2	W of Sunflower to ENE of Doddsville	Sunflower	MS	33.5387°N 90.5828°W	0543 – 0601	11.82 mi (19.02 km)	440 yd (400 m)	$300,000
EF2	One mobile home was destroyed, with its frame being wrapped around a tree, several other mobile homes were damaged (either by falling trees or directly from the wind), a store in a mobile home-like structure was destroyed, several homes sustained major roof damage, numerous outbuildings and barns damaged or destroyed, numerous trees were blown down, and 15 power poles were snapped. A 100-foot (30 m) antenna was bent over and a second was knocked down as well. Three people were injured.							
EF2	NW of Flora to SSW of Atlanta	Natchitoches, Winn	LA	31.6170°N 93.1190°W	0556 – 0614	25.13 mi (40.44 km)	880 yd (800 m)	$300,000
EF2	Trees and power lines were downed in Natchitoches Parish, with several trees falling into and damaging a brick home and a mobile home. Across the Red River in Winn Parish, hundreds of trees and several power poles were snapped, and several homes were severely damaged, with a trailer/mobile home being flipped and destroyed.							
EF1	N of Yazoo City	Yazoo, Holmes	MS	32.9045°N 90.4135°W	0612 – 0624	9.66 mi (15.55 km)	250 yd (230 m)	$270,000
EF1	One home sustained roof damage, and another received damage to its front porch. Many trees were downed as well before the tornado dissipated over the Hillside National Wildlife Refuge.							
EF1	E of Minter City to NE of Charleston	Tallahatchie, Leflore	MS	33.7408°N 90.2436°W	0615 – 0646	27.71 mi (44.59 km)	50 yd (46 m)	$80,000
EF1	A portion of the roof was ripped off both a mobile home and a building, several homes sustained shingle damage, a fence was also blown over, and many trees were downed. The tornado began in Tallahatchie County and crossed the Tallahatchie/Leflore County line twice. It later lifted northwest of Oakland, just before entering Yalobusha County.							
EF1	Sidon to SE of Rising Sun	Leflore	MS	33.4051°N 90.2104°W	0624 – 0627	3.21 mi (5.17 km)	100 yd (91 m)	$50,000
EF1	Many trees were downed in Sidon, several of which landed on a few homes and vehicles, and a mobile home was damaged, having its cover torn off.							
EF0	Southern Tullos to NNW of Summerville	La Salle	LA	31.8120°N 92.3280°W	0636 – 0645	7.98 mi (12.84 km)	100 yd (91 m)	$40,000
EF0	An old building was destroyed in Tullos, with a collapsed wall and a caved-in roof, and many trees were downed.							
EF2	ESE of Lexington to SW of West	Holmes	MS	33.0713°N 89.9795°W	0640 – 0650	12.35 mi (19.88 km)	1,760 yd (1,610 m)	$500,000
EF2	Many trees and several power poles were snapped, and a barn sustained roof damage.							
EF3	SW of Lexington to S of Vaiden	Holmes, Carroll	MS	33.0877°N 90.0775°W	0640 – 0706	23 mi (37 km)	1,760 yd (1,610 m)	$1,300,000
EF3	A couple of mobile homes sustained significant damage, a home and a business sustained roof damage, and hundreds of trees and many power poles were snapped, including three thick wooden high-tension poles, which garnered the EF3 rating. This tornado merged with the 0659 UTC tornado near Beatty.							
EF0	N of Durant	Holmes	MS	33.1089°N 89.8637°W	0651 – 0652	1.7 mi (2.7 km)	50 yd (46 m)	$25,000
EF0	The eastward-facing half of a storage shelter was damaged and half of the sheet metal roof was peeled off, with debris being thrown about 25 yards (23 m) into a field. A few trees and tree limbs were knocked down as well.							
EF2	WSW of Sallis to SSW of Poplar Creek	Attala, Montgomery	MS	33.0057°N 89.8017°W	0651 – 0711	23.01 mi (37.03 km)	860 yd (790 m)	$803,000
EF2	A mobile home and shed were destroyed, one home was pushed off of its block foundation, another home lost part of its roof, a tin roof was torn off of a building at a church camp, and hundreds of trees and many power poles were downed. The tornado lifted north-northeast of Hesterville as its parent thunderstorm merged with another tornadic thunderstorm that moved into Poplar Creek and produced the 0717 UTC EF2 tornado.							
EF2	NW of West to ESE of Vaiden	Holmes, Carroll	MS	33.2200°N 89.8100°W	0659 – 0712	8.81 mi (14.18 km)	880 yd (800 m)	$310,000
EF2	Many trees were downed, and a power pole was blown nearly to the ground. This tornado merged with the 0640 UTC EF3 tornado near Beatty.							
EF1	SSE of Gore Springs	Grenada	MS	33.7030°N 89.6198°W	0706 – 0708	1.86 mi (2.99 km)	150 yd (140 m)	$60,000
EF1	A small homemade storage building was destroyed, a second storage building was wrapped around a tree, and three homes sustained roof damage. Several trees were downed along the path.							
EF2	W of Poplar Creek to N of French Camp	Montgomery, Choctaw	MS	33.3500°N 89.5853°W	0717 – 0728	11.68 mi (18.80 km)	1,760 yd (1,610 m)	$1,475,000
EF2	Thousands of trees were downed, several of which fell onto homes, small barns, sheds, and power lines. One power pole was snapped as well.							
EF1	SSE of Ethel	Attala	MS	33.0044°N 89.4027°W	0720 – 0721	0.49 mi (0.79 km)	50 yd (46 m)	$25,000
EF1	A barn was destroyed, and several trees and large tree limbs were downed northwest of Zama.							
EF2	ESE of Stewart	Choctaw	MS	33.4166°N 89.4349°W	0725 – 0733	6.79 mi (10.93 km)	1,750 yd (1,600 m)	$750,000
EF2	A few homes and barns sustained significant wind damage, and thousands of trees were downed, many of which fell on and caused heavy damage to many other structures. Several power poles were snapped as well. Two people were injured.							
EF1	WSW of Louisville	Winston	MS	33.0611°N 89.2480°W	0729 – 0734	4.2 mi (6.8 km)	150 yd (140 m)	$235,000
EF1	Numerous trees were downed, one of which fell onto a house. The roof was blown off of a shed as well.							
EF3	SW of Eupora to NE of New Wren	Choctaw, Webster, Clay, Chickasaw, Monroe	MS	33.4462°N 89.3691°W	0729 – 0826	58.74 mi (94.53 km)	1,800 yd (1,600 m)	$7,300,000
EF3	Numerous mobile homes were severely damaged, several of which were destroyed; numerous homes sustained severe roof damage, with one home being destroyed in Chickasaw County; many barns and sheds were either damaged or destroyed, and a school in Cumberland suffered extensive damage. In Monroe County, 31 homes and businesses were damaged in the New Wren area. Thousands of trees and several power poles were downed along the path. Later in the day, New Wren would be hit by a killer EF3 tornado. 25 people were injured.							
EF2	S of Eupora to N of Maben	Choctaw, Webster	MS	33.5092°N 89.2547°W	0737 – 0749	13.33 mi (21.45 km)	1,320 yd (1,210 m)	$1,205,000
EF2	1 death – Numerous homes and mobile homes sustained extensive roof and structural damage, numerous sheds and barns were heavily damaged, and a gas station in Sapa was severely damaged, with its canopy being carried away. Thousands of trees were downed, and several power poles were snapped as well. The fatality occurred when a tree fell on a mobile home just west of Mathiston in southeastern Webster County. Five other people were injured.							
EF1	NE of Louisville	Winston	MS	33.1702°N 89.0181°W	0747 – 0757	7.35 mi (11.83 km)	200 yd (180 m)	$260,000
EF1	Numerous trees were downed, one of which fell onto a house, causing significant roof damage. At least two outbuildings were severely damaged as well.							
EF1	N of Brooksville	Noxubee, Lowndes	MS	33.2588°N 88.5872°W	0820 – 0829	6.24 mi (10.04 km)	150 yd (140 m)	$300,000
EF1	A grain bin was knocked over, and a couple of farm buildings and a home sustained minor roof damage. Numerous trees were downed along the path as well.							
EF2	SW of Belmont to E of Dennis	Tishomingo	MS	34.4683°N 88.2808°W	0843 – 0854	9.28 mi (14.93 km)	150 yd (140 m)	$500,000
EF2	This tornado damaged or destroyed 30 homes and a few apartments while also destroying two businesses in Belmont. Belmont's maintenance yard was severely damaged, and a large metal storage building was destroyed as well. Numerous trees and power lines were downed, with one tree falling on a vehicle and trapping the driver, resulting in minor injuries.							
EF1	NNE of Waterloo, AL to NW of Cypress Inn, TN	Lauderdale (AL), Wayne (TN)	AL, TN	34.9300°N 88.0600°W	0901 – 0918	14 mi (23 km)	300 yd (270 m)	>$1,000
EF1	Initially, numerous trees were downed and two boat docks were damaged. Three homes sustained mostly minor roof, window, and garage damage; however, one of the homes had a portion of its garage picked up and thrown over the house and about 75 yards (69 m) away, and a brick was thrown through the home's back window. More trees were downed as the tornado moved northeast, with some falling onto three homes, and a building along SR 20 had three awnings blown off, one of which was blown all the way across the highway. The tornado then crossed into Wayne County, downing a large swath of trees across wooded areas east of SR 69 before dissipating. Some information for this tornado differs from the NCEI database due to 2015 and 2024 reanalysis by the National Weather Service in Nashville, Tennessee.							
EF2	Wahalak, MS to E of Aliceville, AL	Kemper (MS), Noxubee (MS), Pickens (AL)	MS, AL	32.9076°N 88.5313°W	0903 – 0935	35.16 mi (56.58 km)	1,410 yd (1,290 m)	$3,660,000
EF2	The tornado touched down in the small community of Wahalak along US 45, downing trees before quickly moving into Noxubee County. It moved across the Noxubee River and into the Cooksville community, where hundreds of trees and several power lines were downed, part of the roof was taken off a church, and windows were blown out of a house. A few more homes sustained minor damage, and many trees and several power lines were downed as the tornado continued moving northeast and into Alabama. As it moved into Dancy, a barn and two small silos were destroyed, a shed and a farm irrigation system were damaged, and more trees were downed before the tornado dissipated.							
EF1	N of Smithsonia	Lauderdale	AL	34.8080°N 87.8780°W	0919 – 0923	1.82 mi (2.93 km)	100 yd (91 m)	Unknown
EF1	The front end of a church was shifted 4 inches (10 cm), the metal trusses in the roof were twisted, and much of the siding from the front of the church was ripped off. A home near the church sustained exterior damage, consisting of windows being broken, siding being ripped off and thrown approximately 300 yards (270 m) into a field, and numerous twigs and sticks being driven into the walls. Also, insulation from the attic was sucked into the garage, and the water heater was imploded. A 28-foot (8.5 m) travel trailer at the home was picked up, flipped over, and moved approximately 10 feet (3.0 m). Elsewhere, one large storage shed was demolished, while another sustained moderate damage. Numerous trees were downed along the path. One person was injured by broken glass when the tornado struck his vehicle.							
EF1	NW of Cypress Inn	Wayne	TN	35.0479°N 87.8510°W	0919 – 0925	6.16 mi (9.91 km)	200 yd (180 m)	$25,000
EF1	Thousands of trees were downed, and a few outbuildings were damaged before the tornado dissipated into a large downburst. This tornado was listed as thunderstorm wind damage before a 2015 reanalysis by the National Weather Service in Nashville, Tennessee.							
EF2	NW of Carrollton to SE of Palmetto	Pickens	AL	33.3007°N 88.1496°W	0927 – 0942	14.36 mi (23.11 km)	1,232 yd (1,127 m)	$1,800,000
EF2	A home sustained minor wall damage and significant roof damage, at least two outbuildings sustained significant roof damage, and thousands of trees were downed as the tornado passed near Reform.							
EF3	SSE of Gordo to ENE of Samantha	Pickens, Tuscaloosa	AL	33.2448°N 87.8817°W	0941 – 1002	22.46 mi (36.15 km)	704 yd (644 m)	$741,000
EF3	This strong tornado downed many trees in Pickens County before crossing into Tuscaloosa County, passing near Holman. The roof of a home was removed and tossed at least 200 yards (180 m), three outbuildings were either heavily damaged or destroyed, and a 3,500-pound (1,600 kg) trailer was thrown about 100 yards (91 m). Thousands of trees were downed, causing damage to many homes.							
EF1	NW of Ethridge to E of Summertown	Lawrence, Maury	TN	35.3655°N 87.3616°W	0950 – 1004	11.14 mi (17.93 km)	300 yd (270 m)	$86,000
EF1	Hundreds of trees were snapped, and several homes and other structures were damaged. One person sustained minor injuries when part of his home collapsed. Some information for this tornado differs from the NCEI database due to 2015 and 2023 reanalysis by the National Weather Service in Nashville, Tennessee.							
EF1	Berry	Fayette	AL	33.6325°N 87.6488°W	1003 – 1011	7.28 mi (11.72 km)	176 yd (161 m)	$1,400,000
EF1	The tornado touched down southwest of Berry and moved through the downtown area, where numerous businesses and homes sustained roof and wall damage. Several barns were damaged, and many trees were downed before the tornado lifted northeast of Berry. Four people were injured.							
EF3	SE of Cottondale to SW of McCalla	Tuscaloosa, Jefferson	AL	33.1630°N 87.3716°W	1017 – 1035	20.26 mi (32.61 km)	200 yd (180 m)	$9,280,000
EF3	A strong tornado touched down just west of Coaling, where over a dozen homes were either heavily damaged or completely destroyed, including a poorly constructed home that was completely leveled. A building at a Mercedes plant sustained roof damage, and numerous trees and light poles were downed as well.							
EF3	SSW of Parrish to NNE of Cordova	Walker	AL	33.5979°N 87.3278°W	1018 – 1036	18.9 mi (30.4 km)	375 yd (343 m)	$13,400,000
EF3	Three single-wide manufactured homes were completely destroyed, an unanchored frame home was swept clean from its foundation, and several other homes and other structures were damaged. In downtown Cordova, brick buildings sustained significant roof and parapet damage. Many trees were downed along the path, and 20 people were injured. The same area was hit by an EF4 tornado that afternoon, which caused EF3-strength damage in Cordova itself.							
EF1	Mount Juliet	Wilson	TN	36.2000°N 86.5200°W	1023 – 1026	2.04 mi (3.28 km)	150 yd (140 m)	Unknown
EF1	A low-end EF1 tornado moved through downtown Mount Juliet and dissipated near Mount Juliet High School. Several homes had windows blown out, one home was shifted off its foundation, and the police department building was damaged. This tornado was listed as thunderstorm wind damage before a 2023 reanalysis by the National Weather Service in Nashville, Tennessee.							
EF0	NW of LaGuardo	Wilson	TN	36.3061°N 86.5008°W	1023 – 1027	3.04 mi (4.89 km)	50 yd (46 m)	$20,000
EF0	Numerous trees were downed, and the roof was blown off the main dining hall at the Boxwell Scout Reservation. This tornado was listed as thunderstorm wind damage before a 2015 reanalysis by the National Weather Service in Nashville, Tennessee.							
EF1	NNW of Chapel Hill to SE of Eagleville	Marshall, Rutherford, Bedford	TN	35.6696°N 86.7286°W	1034 – 1044	8.21 mi (13.21 km)	150 yd (140 m)	$152,000
EF1	Hundreds of trees and several power lines were downed, and numerous homes sustained roof and siding damage as the tornado crossed from Marshall County to Rutherford to Bedford and back to Rutherford. Some information for this tornado differs from the NCEI database due to a 2015 reanalysis by the National Weather Service in Nashville, Tennessee.							
EF0	SSW of Bethpage	Sumner	TN	36.4451°N 86.3619°W	1035 – 1039	3.7 mi (6.0 km)	100 yd (91 m)	$25,000
EF0	A few homes sustained roof and exterior damage, a barn sustained heavy damage, and dozens of trees were downed along the path. This tornado was listed as thunderstorm wind damage before a 2015 reanalysis by the National Weather Service in Nashville, Tennessee.							
EF2	S of Taft, TN to E of Fayetteville, TN	Madison (AL), Lincoln (TN)	AL, TN	34.9800°N 86.7200°W	1036 – 1054	17.8 mi (28.6 km)	600 yd (550 m)	Unknown
EF2	Many homes sustained minor structural damage and shingle loss, carports and vehicles were damaged, and an anchored mobile home was picked up and rolled. Hundreds of trees were downed, with a few landing on and causing damage to a mobile home. This tornado was originally one track across Lincoln and Moore counties but was split into two tracks in a 2024 reanalysis. The beginning of this path was extended into Madison County, Alabama.							
EF1	NE of Eagleville to Western Murfreesboro	Rutherford	TN	35.7733°N 86.6014°W	1043 – 1054	9.9 mi (15.9 km)	500 yd (460 m)	>$141,000
EF1	Several homes sustained mostly minor roof and structural damage near Rockvale and in the Country Park subdivision and a neighboring subdivision in the western part of Murfreesboro, south of SR 96. Hundreds of trees were downed along the path as well. This event was originally two separate tornadoes before a 2015 reanalysis by the National Weather Service in Nashville, Tennessee.							
EF2	SW of Wilburn to northwestern Hanceville to SW of Holly Pond	Cullman	AL	33.9176°N 87.0472°W	1048 – 1120	30.32 mi (48.80 km)	880 yd (800 m)	Unknown
EF2	1 death – A strong, long-tracked tornado struck Hanceville, where several campus buildings at Wallace State Community College sustained damage, mainly consisting of large portions of metal roofing being torn off. Other damage to the campus buildings included windows being blown out of a mid-rise and a high-rise, and eight nearby metal power poles were bent over just above the base. Elsewhere along the path, numerous sheds and chicken houses were either damaged or destroyed, a barn was nearly destroyed, and many trees were downed. To the south of the main track, in downtown Hanceville, strong straight-line winds resulted in partial loss of the roof of the high school gym and heavy damage to several small buildings, in addition to a significant number of trees being downed.							
EF1	ENE of Hoover	Shelby, Jefferson	AL	33.3780°N 86.7509°W	1050 – 1054	3.39 mi (5.46 km)	100 yd (91 m)	$3,715,000
EF1	Many trees were downed, damaging homes, apartment buildings, and vehicles, as well as bringing down power lines.							
EF2	NE of Warrior	Jefferson, Blount	AL	33.8300°N 86.8012°W	1053 – 1057	3.23 mi (5.20 km)	200 yd (180 m)	$9,300,000
EF2	In Jefferson County and near the county line, an outbuilding was destroyed and dozens of trees were downed, resulting in damage to several homes. Moving northeast into Blount County, the tornado strengthened and moved along the western edge of Mountain Woods Lake, where three homes were destroyed and twenty to twenty-five homes were damaged. Multiple boat docks and garages were either damaged or destroyed, and hundreds more trees were downed. Three people were injured in one of the destroyed homes.							
EF2	WSW of Cahaba Heights to SW of Leeds	Jefferson	AL	33.4367°N 86.7622°W	1054 – 1100	7.76 mi (12.49 km)	200 yd (180 m)	$18,000,000
EF2	This tornado moved through the Cahaba Heights neighborhood, knocking down many trees, several of which caused significant damage to numerous homes. Businesses and other buildings sustained damage as well before the tornado lifted just south-southwest of Barber Motorsports Park. Twenty people were injured, and one indirect fatality occurred in the area when a tree fell on a man during clean-up efforts.							
EF0	Northern Murfreesboro	Rutherford	TN	35.8783°N 86.4402°W	1054 – 1101	4.61 mi (7.42 km)	100 yd (91 m)	Unknown
EF0	The tornado touched down in the Stones River National Battlefield before crossing through several neighborhoods, causing roof and siding damage to numerous houses. Several fences were blown down, and trees and power lines were downed as well. This tornado was listed as thunderstorm wind damage prior to a 2015 reanalysis by the National Weather Service in Nashville, Tennessee.							
EF1	SW of Mulberry to SE of Lynchburg	Lincoln, Moore	TN	35.1800°N 86.4700°W	1057 – 1107	9.83 mi (15.82 km)	400 yd (370 m)	Unknown
EF1	Hundreds of trees were downed, homes sustained roof damage, and a church was damaged. This tornado was originally one track across Lincoln and Moore counties but was split into two tracks in a 2024 reanalysis.							
EF0	NW of Statesville to E of Watertown	Wilson	TN	36.0450°N 86.1799°W	1111 – 1117	5.7 mi (9.2 km)	200 yd (180 m)	>$50,000
EF0	Several homes sustained minor roof damage, a barn was destroyed, and dozens of trees were downed. This tornado was listed as thunderstorm wind damage prior to a 2015 reanalysis by the National Weather Service in Nashville, Tennessee.							
EF2	S of Normandy	Moore, Bedford, Coffee	TN	35.3900°N 86.2900°W	1112 – 1117	4.47 mi (7.19 km)	100 yd (91 m)	>$43,000
EF2	At least one mobile home was destroyed, several others were rolled off of their foundations, a church was damaged, and hundreds of trees were downed. A 2015 reanalysis by the National Weather Service in Nashville, Tennessee indicated that the tornado continued into Coffee County prior to dissipating.							
EF1	NE of Blountsville to E of Red Hill	Blount, Marshall	AL	34.0894°N 86.5342°W	1112 – 1126	14.83 mi (23.87 km)	200 yd (180 m)	$41,500
EF1	Hundreds of trees were downed, some of which caused damage to several homes. Several outbuildings and barns were destroyed, and two chicken houses sustained minor roof damage as well.							
EF2	SE of Branchville to E of Odenville	St. Clair	AL	33.6473°N 86.4153°W	1116 – 1119	3.84 mi (6.18 km)	200 yd (180 m)	$865,000
EF2	Two multi-story brick homes sustained significant damage, one of which lost a large portion of its roof deck material, a garage was shifted off of its foundation (with the roof remaining intact and crushing the rest of the structure), and a few trees were downed. Five people were injured.							
EF0	WSW of Red Boiling Springs	Macon	TN	36.5100°N 85.9400°W	1118 – 1120	2.04 mi (3.28 km)	50 yd (46 m)	Unknown
EF0	Numerous trees were blown down along the path. This tornado was documented during a 2020 reanalysis by the National Weather Service in Nashville, Tennessee.							
EF0	E of Gassaway	DeKalb	TN	35.9200°N 85.9300°W	1119 – 1121	1.52 mi (2.45 km)	50 yd (46 m)	Unknown
EF0	A tornado downed numerous trees in a rural area of the Pea Ridge community. This tornado was documented during a 2024 reanalysis by the National Weather Service in Nashville, Tennessee.							
EF1	W of Red Hill to Guntersville	Cullman, Marshall	AL	34.2596°N 86.4599°W	1120 – 1140	11.04 mi (17.77 km)	75 yd (69 m)	Unknown
EF1	One mobile home was rolled several times before hitting a tree and falling back on its side with its frame bent and its roof badly damaged, a second mobile home was blown several feet from its original location, and an unanchored outbuilding was rolled several times. Two chicken houses were destroyed, with a third sustaining major damage, and several barns were damaged, one or two of which were completely destroyed. Other mobile homes sustained minor damage to the roofs and flashing underneath, and many trees were downed before the tornado lifted near the intersection of US 431 and SR 69 in Guntersville.							
EF0	SW of New Middleton to Elmwood	Smith	TN	36.1500°N 86.0400°W	1122 – 1132	9.48 mi (15.26 km)	100 yd (91 m)	$16,000
EF0	This weak tornado touched down west of SR 53, crossed SR 141 and I-40 near New Middleton, and crossed SR 53 and the Caney Fork River north of Gordonsville before dissipating near Elmwood. Hundreds of trees were downed, a few homes suffered roof damage, and a gas station sustained minor damage. The path was lengthened by several miles after a 2024 reanalysis by the National Weather Service in Nashville, Tennessee.							
EF1	Red Hill to S of Warrenton	Marshall	AL	34.2548°N 86.4307°W	1124 – 1134	6.37 mi (10.25 km)	100 yd (91 m)	Unknown
EF1	Several chicken houses sustained significant roof damage, and numerous large hardwood trees were downed.							
EF1	N of Red Boiling Springs, TN to E of Gamaliel, KY	Macon (TN), Clay (TN), Monroe (KY)	TN, KY	36.5906°N 85.8341°W	1127 – 1134	6.32 mi (10.17 km)	100 yd (91 m)	Unknown
EF1	In Macon County, at least four barns and outbuildings were destroyed, two more barns were damaged, and two cinder-block buildings lost part of their roofs. The tornado clipped northwest corner of Clay County before moving into Monroe County, were several more barns and outbuildings were destroyed before the tornado lifted. Hundreds of trees were downed along the path through all three counties. This tornado was not listed in the NCEI database prior to a 2015 reanalysis by the National Weather Service in Nashville, Tennessee.							
EF1	SSW of Guntersville	Marshall	AL	34.2554°N 86.3491°W	1130 – 1140	3.39 mi (5.46 km)	100 yd (91 m)	Unknown
EF1	This tornado, which moved parallel to SR 79 on the east side, impacted a church, where it tore away the steeple and threw it about 100 feet (30 m) and also removed porch columns. The wooden front porch of a nearby house was removed and thrown 100 feet (30 m) behind the house, and large tree branches fell onto the roof, causing damage. Many trees were downed along the path as well.							
EF1	W of Albertville to SE of Guntersville	Marshall	AL	34.2575°N 86.3088°W	1130 – 1140	5.69 mi (9.16 km)	50 yd (46 m)	Unknown
EF1	Several barns were destroyed, numerous outbuildings had significant portions of their tin roofing peeled off, and many trees were downed, a few of which fell on and caused damage to homes. Several power poles were snapped along the path as well.							
EF1	W of Albertville	Marshall	AL	34.2486°N 86.2582°W	1130 – 1140	4.58 mi (7.37 km)	50 yd (46 m)	Unknown
EF1	This tornado tracked just east of the previous tornado, destroying a chicken house and causing roof and siding loss to several others. Many trees were downed as well, some of which fell onto several houses.							
EF2	W of Warrenton to N of Grove Oak	Marshall, DeKalb	AL	34.3616°N 86.3712°W	1130 – 1155	19.97 mi (32.14 km)	880 yd (800 m)	Unknown
EF2	The tornado touched down along SR 69, downing numerous trees and removing shingles from several homes before moving across Lake Guntersville. It crossed US 431 and struck Buck Island, where numerous homes sustained minor roof damage, several piers and sheds were destroyed, many trees were downed, and several power poles were snapped at their bases. The tornado then crossed another portion of the lake before moving through the northern part of Lake Guntersville State Park at EF2 intensity, downing hundreds of trees, damaging several RV campers at the camp grounds, and causing minor roof damage at the camp lodge. As the tornado continued northeast, a mobile home, a barn, and a shed were destroyed, a second mobile home was rolled over, and hundreds more trees were downed. It then crossed into DeKalb County, downing several more trees before dissipating just south of Buck's Pocket State Park.							
EF0	E of Carthage to NNW of Granville	Smith, Jackson	TN	36.2683°N 85.9011°W	1131 – 1137	6.79 mi (10.93 km)	200 yd (180 m)	Unknown
EF0	The tornado touched down on Cordell Hull Lake, moving across McClure Bend and Sullivan Bend and into Jackson County on Brooks Bend, destroying an old barn and downing dozens of trees along the path. This tornado was not listed in the NCEI database prior to a 2015 reanalysis by the National Weather Service in Nashville, Tennessee.							
EF1	Greensburg to N of Bluff Boom	Green	KY	37.2583°N 85.5036°W	1132 – 1135	3.14 mi (5.05 km)	150 yd (140 m)	Unknown
EF1	This tornado touched down along US 68 just north of the Green River in Greensburg, where numerous homes sustained window and chimney damage. A brick building sustained both exterior and interior damage at the industrial park in Greensburg, and two barns were destroyed and a mobile home sustained significant damage northeast of town just before the tornado dissipated.							
EF1	SW of Guntersville	Marshall	AL	34.2798°N 86.3935°W	1135 – 1140	4.93 mi (7.93 km)	100 yd (91 m)	Unknown
EF1	A house sustained significant roof loss, and many trees were downed.							
EF1	S of Grant	Marshall	AL	34.4901°N 86.2613°W	1135 – 1140	0.32 mi (510 m)	50 yd (46 m)	$10,000
EF1	A brief tornado downed several trees and caused minor roof damage to a home.							
EF0	S of Summitville	Coffee	TN	35.5200°N 86.0300°W	1136 – 1144	5.15 mi (8.29 km)	50 yd (46 m)	$10,000
EF0	A tornado northeast of Manchester caused minor damage. The path was lengthened after 2015 and 2024 reanalysis by the National Weather Service in Nashville, Tennessee.							
EF0	W of Gainesboro to WSW of Whitleyville	Jackson	TN	36.3659°N 85.7459°W	1138 – 1143	4.66 mi (7.50 km)	100 yd (91 m)	Unknown
EF0	Dozens of trees were blown down along the path. This tornado was not listed in the NCEI database prior to a 2015 reanalysis by the National Weather Service in Nashville, Tennessee.							
EF0	W of Baxter	Putnam	TN	36.1600°N 85.6700°W	1141 – 1142	1.29 mi (2.08 km)	100 yd (91 m)	Unknown
EF0	A brief tornado downed numerous trees. This tornado was documented during a 2024 reanalysis by the National Weather Service in Nashville, Tennessee.							
EF1	NE of Kempville to NNE of Whitleyville	Jackson, Clay	TN	36.4047°N 85.7900°W	1141 – 1150	9.89 mi (15.92 km)	500 yd (460 m)	$45,000
EF1	Thousands of trees were downed along the path, which crossed SR 56 and SR 135 before ending near SR 53 and the Cumberland River in far southern Clay County. Some information for this tornado differs from the NCEI database due to a 2015 reanalysis by the National Weather Service in Nashville, Tennessee.							
EF0	NNE of Guntersville	Marshall	AL	34.4226°N 86.2845°W	1143 – 1145	2.76 mi (4.44 km)	75 yd (69 m)	$0
EF0	Numerous trees were downed.							
EF1	Lake Guntersville State Park	Marshall	AL	34.3750°N 86.2005°W	1145 – 1149	4.83 mi (7.77 km)	200 yd (180 m)	Unknown
EF1	The tornado moved roughly along SR 227, downing many trees, including a few large pine trees, near the entrance and golf course at Lake Guntersville State Park. More trees were downed to the northeast before the tornado dissipated.							
EF1	SW of Joe Starnes Field to N of Lake Guntersville State Park	Marshall	AL	34.3836°N 86.2970°W	1145 – 1151	6.89 mi (11.09 km)	300 yd (270 m)	Unknown
EF1	The tornado touched down over Lake Guntersville, northeast of the city of Guntersville, and moved on land to the northeast, where a canopy was collapsed at a marina, and trees were downed at Joe Starnes Field and across the north side of Buck Island. After crossing Lake Guntersville again, more trees were downed before the tornado lifted.							
EF1	SE of Morrison to SE of McMinnville	Warren	TN	35.5676°N 85.8877°W	1147 – 1200	12.31 mi (19.81 km)	100 yd (91 m)	$121,000
EF1	Trees were downed along a path beginning at SR 287 northwest of Viola and following SR 108 to the northeast, passing just south of McMinnville. A mobile home was overturned and destroyed, and many trees and several power lines were blown down, with scattered tree damage up and down both sides of 1,000-foot (300 m) Ben Lomond Mountain. Two people were injured in the overturned mobile home. Some information for this tornado differs from the NCEI database due to a 2015 reanalysis by the National Weather Service in Nashville, Tennessee.							
EF1	ESE of Grant	Marshall	AL	34.5018°N 86.1911°W	1149 – 1152	1.55 mi (2.49 km)	100 yd (91 m)	Unknown
EF1	A brief tornado skipped northeast along SR 79, downing many trees, with several of them falling on and causing damage to numerous homes on Pine Island and Preston Island along the shore of Lake Guntersville.							
EF0	N of Dodson Branch	Jackson	TN	36.3300°N 85.5300°W	1153 – 1154	0.9 mi (1.4 km)	50 yd (46 m)	Unknown
EF0	A brief tornado downed numerous trees in a convergent pattern. This tornado was documented during a 2024 reanalysis by the National Weather Service in Nashville, Tennessee.							
EF0	NE of Moss	Clay	TN	36.6000°N 85.5700°W	1154 – 1155	1 mi (1.6 km)	50 yd (46 m)	Unknown
EF0	A brief tornado downed numerous trees in a hilly area. This tornado was documented during a 2024 reanalysis by the National Weather Service in Nashville, Tennessee.							
EF1	ESE of Section to E of Higdon	Jackson, DeKalb	AL	34.5735°N 85.9678°W	1158 – 1236	27.85 mi (44.82 km)	300 yd (270 m)	Unknown
EF1	1 death – A weak, but long-tracked tornado touched down near Section and tracked roughly along SR 71 through Dutton, just south of Pisgah, and into DeKalb County south of Higdon, where it lifted shortly thereafter. Many trees were downed, which brought down power lines and knocked out power, and a mobile home was destroyed. The fatality occurred in the Pisgah area. A violent EF4 tornado struck the same area later that day, making the path of this tornado hard to distinguish from that tornado's path. Several eyewitness accounts of the morning damage assisted the storm surveyors in separating the two paths.							
EF1	NW of Vernon to NE of Judio	Monroe, Cumberland	KY	36.6394°N 85.5153°W	1202 – 1206	5.94 mi (9.56 km)	550 yd (500 m)	Unknown
EF1	Two large barns and several outbuildings were destroyed, a few homes sustained minor structural damage, and hundreds of hardwood trees were downed, with a few landing on houses and causing roof damage.							
EF0	N of Rickman	Overton	TN	36.2700°N 85.4023°W	1206 – 1208	2.44 mi (3.93 km)	50 yd (46 m)	$30,000
EF0	Numerous trees were downed on both sides of SR 111, some of which landed on homes and vehicles. The NCEI database erroneously lists this tornado as occurring in Jackson County.							
EF2	NW of Henagar to NE of Rosalie	DeKalb, Jackson	AL	34.6372°N 85.7691°W	1210 – 1218	5.75 mi (9.25 km)	200 yd (180 m)	>$30,000
EF2	At least three barns and a shed were destroyed, the west end of a well-constructed home was collapsed, and many trees were downed.							
EF1	NNE of Mentone	DeKalb	AL	34.6004°N 85.5835°W	1218 – 1222	4.05 mi (6.52 km)	50 yd (46 m)	Unknown
EF1	Numerous trees were downed, and a home sustained partial roof loss.							
EF1	SW of Trenton to W of Hooker	Dade	GA	34.8586°N 85.5323°W	1240 – 1248	9.9 mi (15.9 km)	100 yd (91 m)	$1,000,000
EF1	Several homes, a bank building, and an elementary school sustained minor damage in Trenton, and dozens of trees were downed along the path. The tornado lifted just before reaching the Tennessee border.							
EF0	NNW of Crossville	Cumberland	TN	36.0009°N 85.1133°W	1242 – 1247	5 mi (8.0 km)	100 yd (91 m)	$30,000
EF0	Numerous trees were either snapped or twisted as the tornado touched down near US 70N, crossed I-40, and lifted near US 127.							
EF0	SW of Clarkrange	Fentress	TN	36.1495°N 85.0981°W	1243 – 1245	2.07 mi (3.33 km)	50 yd (46 m)	Unknown
EF0	A tornado north SR 62, just east of the Overton County line, downed several trees and caused minor structural damage. This tornado was listed as thunderstorm wind damage prior to a 2015 reanalysis by the National Weather Service in Nashville, Tennessee, despite being originally confirmed as a tornado following a damage survey. Further reanalysis significantly lengthened the path.							
EF1	St. Elmo	Hamilton	TN	34.9900°N 85.3330°W	1255 – 1256	0.7 mi (1.1 km)	80 yd (73 m)	$100,000
EF1	A few homes and businesses were damaged and several trees were downed a block west of Highway 17, just below Lookout Mountain.							
EF2	Tiftonia	Hamilton	TN	35.0200°N 85.3700°W	1255 – 1257	2.3 mi (3.7 km)	500 yd (460 m)	$750,000
EF2	Several homes and businesses were damaged, and many trees were downed in Lookout Valley.							
EF1	Red Bank to Hixson	Hamilton	TN	35.1100°N 85.2900°W	1256 – 1259	2.5 mi (4.0 km)	250 yd (230 m)	$150,000
EF1	Several buildings sustained roof and structural damage, and numerous trees and power lines were downed.							
EF0	Harrison	Hamilton	TN	35.1100°N 85.1500°W	1303 – 1305	0.5 mi (0.80 km)	100 yd (91 m)	$25,000
EF0	Trees and power lines were downed, and a few buildings were damaged.							
EF1	East Ridge	Hamilton	TN	34.9870°N 85.2710°W	1304 – 1308	2.2 mi (3.5 km)	200 yd (180 m)	$25,000
EF1	Numerous trees were downed through East Ridge.							
EF1	S of Birchwood	Hamilton	TN	35.3520°N 84.9960°W	1337 – 1338	0.6 mi (0.97 km)	100 yd (91 m)	$25,000
EF1	Numerous trees were downed.							
EF2	N of Hopewell	Bradley	TN	35.2800°N 84.9300°W	1345 – 1348	2 mi (3.2 km)	150 yd (140 m)	$125,000
EF2	Three mobile homes were destroyed and other structures were damaged, and many trees and power lines were downed. One person was injured.							
EF0	Southeast New Carlisle	Clark	OH	39.9227°N 84.0302°W	1353 – 1354	1.31 mi (2.11 km)	200 yd (180 m)	$25,000
EF0	The roof was partially lifted off a building at an RV dealership, with two by four roof support beams being driven into the ground, and large debris was blown into a public pool complex. Numerous trees and several power poles were downed as well.							
EF0	WSW of Athens	Limestone	AL	34.7704°N 87.1520°W	1615 – 1625	7.19 mi (11.57 km)	150 yd (140 m)	Unknown
EF0	A weak tornado embedded within a larger area of straight-line winds downed numerous large trees and caused roof-awning and gutter damage to some homes, in addition to removing shingles.							
EF1	NW of Decatur to SSE of Tanner	Morgan, Limestone	AL	34.6452°N 87.0790°W	1620 – 1630	8.95 mi (14.40 km)	75 yd (69 m)	Unknown
EF1	The tornado touched down at the Decatur Industrial Park, causing roof damage to an industrial building and snapping numerous hardwood trees 20 feet (6.1 m) from the base. It then caused minor roof damage to another industrial complex before crossing the Tennessee River into Limestone County, where it passed over Pryor Field Regional Airport, causing it to lose power at 1628 UTC, shortly before lifting along I-65. Many trees were snapped along the path, including on the campus of Calhoun Community College.							
EF0	NW of Tanner	Limestone	AL	34.7307°N 87.0329°W	1623 – 1628	4.06 mi (6.53 km)	50 yd (46 m)	Unknown
EF0	A weak tornado touched down west of Tanner and dissipated just north of the community, uprooting trees and causing signage damage near Tanner High School.							
EF1	French Mill to E of Deposit	Limestone, Madison	AL	34.7554°N 86.8660°W	1630 – 1705	25.31 mi (40.73 km)	200 yd (180 m)	Unknown
EF1	Many homes sustained roof and gutter damage, which included shingle loss. Many trees, many of which were large hardwood trees, were either snapped, uprooted, or sheared off, and numerous power poles were snapped.							
EF1	NNE of Capshaw to SSW of Harvest	Limestone, Madison	AL	34.7855°N 86.7894°W	1635 – 1640	3.09 mi (4.97 km)	100 yd (91 m)	Unknown
EF1	Several homes sustained roof, shingle, and gutter damage, and numerous trees were snapped, several of which were large.							
EF1	WNW of Normal to SE of Moores Mill	Madison	AL	34.8004°N 86.6226°W	1650 – 1705	7.6 mi (12.2 km)	500 yd (460 m)	Unknown
EF1	Homes sustained roof and gutter damage, and numerous trees, many of which were hardwood, were either downed or sheared off.							
EF0	SW of New Market	Madison	AL	34.8653°N 86.4911°W	1655 – 1705	3.51 mi (5.65 km)	100 yd (91 m)	$0
EF0	A tornado embedded in a larger area of straight-line winds either knocked down or sheared off the top half of numerous hardwood trees near Buckhorn High School.							
EF1	SW of Haletown	Marion	TN	34.9845°N 85.6000°W	1826 – 1829	2.2 mi (3.5 km)	80 yd (73 m)	$25,000
EF1	Numerous trees were downed near SR 156.							
EF1	NE of Dunlap	Sequatchie, Bledsoe	TN	35.3952°N 85.3665°W	1826 – 1832	4.9 mi (7.9 km)	80 yd (73 m)	$150,000
EF1	Several roofs were damaged and numerous trees were downed.							
EF3	ESE of Springdale to WNW of Denmark	Lafayette	MS	34.2084°N 89.5653°W	1836 – 1852	13.57 mi (21.84 km)	440 yd (400 m)	$1,500,000
EF3	A strong tornado to the south and southeast of Oxford either damaged or destroyed a number of site-built homes and mobile homes and downed numerous trees and power lines were downed as well. Eight people were injured.							
EF1	SW of Collegedale to Northern Cleveland	Hamilton, Bradley	TN	35.0400°N 85.0700°W	1902 – 1918	17 mi (27 km)	120 yd (110 m)	$125,000
EF1	1 death – Several homes sustained minor to moderate roof damage and numerous trees were downed. The fatality occurred in Bradley County in a vehicle that was impacted by debris.							
EF0	SE of Hopewell	Bradley	TN	35.2100°N 84.9000°W	1915 – 1917	1.78 mi (2.86 km)	50 yd (46 m)	$15,000
EF0	Several trees were downed.							
EF0	S of Dumas	Union	MS	34.5912°N 88.8323°W	1928 – 1929	0.4 mi (640 m)	25 yd (23 m)	$10,000
EF0	A brief tornado touched down near the Union/Tippah county line along MS north of Pleasant Ridge and moved northeast, downing numerous trees.							
F0	Fergus	Wellington	ON	43.7100°N 80.3800°W	1930	Unknown	Unknown	Unknown
F0	Local buildings sustained minor damage, and many trees were downed. The tornado was embedded in a squall line.							
EF5	Northern Philadelphia to SE of Mashulaville	Neshoba, Kemper, Winston, Noxubee	MS	32.7992°N 89.1088°W	1930 – 2000	28.28 mi (45.51 km)	900 yd (820 m)	$1,100,000
EF5	3 deaths – See article on this tornado – At least eight people were injured.							
EF0	Cleveland to ESE of Hopewell	Bradley	TN	35.1700°N 84.8977°W	1936 – 1939	2 mi (3.2 km)	150 yd (140 m)	$50,000
EF0	The tornado moved from just west of downtown Cleveland to east-southeast of Hopewell, knocking down trees and causing slight damage to a few structures. The Bradley County EMA office was just brushed by this tornado.							
EF4	WSW of Good Hope to Cullman to NE of Union Grove	Cullman, Morgan, Marshall	AL	34.0757°N 87.0097°W	1940 – 2038	46.88 mi (75.45 km)	880 yd (800 m)	Unknown
EF4	6 deaths – See article on this tornado – At least 48 people were injured.							
EF3	N of Bellefontaine to NW of Amory	Webster, Calhoun, Chickasaw, Monroe	MS	33.7114°N 89.3164°W	1948 – 2038	51.45 mi (82.80 km)	1,320 yd (1,210 m)	$3,270,000
EF3	4 deaths – See section on this tornado - 25 people were injured.							
EF0	NE of Rienzi	Alcorn	MS	34.7709°N 88.5147°W	1950 – 1956	2.32 mi (3.73 km)	50 yd (46 m)	$100,000
EF0	A few homes sustained minor damage and numerous trees were downed.							
EF0	S of Jonesboro	Craighead	AR	35.7381°N 90.6949°W	1955 – 1956	0.26 mi (420 m)	50 yd (46 m)	$25,000
EF0	An office building sustained roof damage (consisting of the roof being partially blown off), two garage doors on storage units were blown in, a window was blown out of a business, and a chain-link fence was partially downed.							
EF0	Endville	Pontotoc	MS	34.3202°N 88.8848°W	1959 – 2002	1.02 mi (1.64 km)	75 yd (69 m)	$100,000
EF0	A couple of homes in Endville sustained minor damage, and numerous trees were downed.							
EF2	NW of Bay	Craighead	AR	35.7699°N 90.6161°W	2001 – 2002	1.23 mi (1.98 km)	200 yd (180 m)	$10,000
EF2	A carport awning was lifted up and thrown, and several structures were damaged at the Bay Airport.							
EF0	NNE of Hopewell Springs	Monroe	TN	35.5400°N 84.2800°W	2004 – 2007	2.3 mi (3.7 km)	100 yd (91 m)	$15,000
EF0	A few trees were downed.							
EF5	WSW of Hamilton to Tanner to E of Harvest	Marion, Franklin, Lawrence, Morgan, Limestone, Madison	AL	34.1043°N 88.1479°W	2005 – 2150	102.3 mi (164.6 km)	2,200 yd (2,000 m)	>$1.29 billion
EF5	71 deaths – See article on this tornado – At least 145 people were injured. A 2022 re-analysis shortened the path from the initial 132.1-mile (212.6 km) as it was found that the tornado dissipated east of Harvest and the damage path near Huntland, Tennessee was determined to be a separate EF3 tornado.							
EF1	Bowman	Craighead	AR	35.8025°N 90.5074°W	2008 – 2010	1.6 mi (2.6 km)	250 yd (230 m)	$250,000
EF1	Five homes and a business garage were damaged, three mobile homes, two brick homes, and another business garage sustained roof damage, and a storage shed was destroyed. A chain link fence was blown over, and a few trees and tree limbs were downed as well.							
EF2	NW of Crystal Springs to SSW of Terry	Copiah, Hinds	MS	32.0382°N 90.4918°W	2011 – 2024	10.46 mi (16.83 km)	440 yd (400 m)	$1,000,000
EF2	Two wood-framed homes were pushed off their foundations, with one being destroyed, and three to four mobile homes were heavily damaged as they were pushed off their foundations. In Hinds County, a well-built home had a large section of its roof removed and an adjacent carport was blown apart. Many trees were downed along the path before the tornado lifted just after crossing I-55. Two people were injured.							
EF0	SE of Harviell	Butler	MO	36.6319°N 90.4242°W	2015 – 2019	2.2 mi (3.5 km)	40 yd (37 m)	$0
EF0	Sheriff's deputies observed this tornado moving over open fields, with only two trees being uprooted.							
EF0	SW of Monette	Craighead	AR	35.8691°N 90.3734°W	2017 – 2018	0.59 mi (950 m)	75 yd (69 m)	$30,000
EF0	A pivot irrigation system was flipped over, two telephone poles were knocked down, and a few tree limbs were broken off.							
EF0	ESE of Sardis	Panola	MS	34.4099°N 89.7976°W	2017 – 2022	1.58 mi (2.54 km)	25 yd (23 m)	$0
EF0	A brief tornado touched down near Sardis Dam and moved over Sardis Lake near the John W. Kyle State Park as a waterspout, lifting without causing any damage.							
EF1	NE of Macon	Noxubee	MS	33.1446°N 88.5191°W	2018 – 2029	8.32 mi (13.39 km)	500 yd (460 m)	$300,000
EF1	Two irrigation pivots were overturned, a small grain bin was torn down, and a large grain silo was damaged. A farm was impacted, with two large empty grain bins being destroyed and several smaller bins being damaged, four metal sheds sustaining minor roof and door damage, and a radio tower being collapsed. Numerous trees were damaged, and the leaves of a crop of young corn plants were shredded.							
EF4	NE of Pickensville to Cordova to SSW of Guntersville	Pickens, Tuscaloosa, Fayette, Walker, Cullman, Blount, Marshall	AL	33.2506°N 88.1814°W	2040 – 2256	127.8 mi (205.7 km)	1,408 yd (1,287 m)	>$170,344,000
EF4	13 deaths – See article on this tornado – At least 54 people were injured.							
EF5	SW of Smithville, MS to ENE of Hodges, AL	Monroe (MS), Itawamba (MS), Marion (AL), Franklin (AL)	MS, AL	34.0455°N 88.4450°W	2042 – 2123	37.3 mi (60.0 km)	1,320 yd (1,210 m)	$14,400,000
EF5	23 deaths – See article on this tornado – 137 people were injured.							
EF3	NE of Scooba, MS to S of Aliceville, AL	Kemper (MS), Sumter (AL), Pickens (AL)	MS, AL	32.8496°N 88.4528°W	2047 – 2115	23.74 mi (38.21 km)	1,056 yd (966 m)	$3,400,000
EF3	In Kemper County, a large shed and a mobile home were completely destroyed, with all of the mobile home except the frame being tossed into the woods. A well-built house and several mobile homes had most or all of their roofs removed, a shed was damaged, and several buildings at a catfish farm were damaged. Many trees and power lines were downed along the path. The tornado entered Sumter County northwest of Geiger, Alabama, downing thousands of trees across the county on a 1/2-mile (0.80 km) wide path. Moving into Pickens County, the tornado strengthened to EF3, with a large, well-built cinder block building having a significant part of its roof torn off and an outer wall knocked down. More trees were downed before the tornado crossed through the Tombigbee River bottom near Vienna and dissipated just north of the Sipsey River. Two people were injured in Sumter County.							
EF1	SW of Vonore	Monroe	TN	35.5400°N 84.3000°W	2049 – 2053	3.4 mi (5.5 km)	100 yd (91 m)	$25,000
EF1	Numerous trees were downed.							
EF4	NE of Section, AL to Fort Oglethorpe, GA	Jackson (AL), DeKalb (AL), Dade (GA), Walker (GA)	AL, GA	34.6208°N 85.9814°W	2101 – 2157	46.98 mi (75.61 km)	1,260 yd (1,150 m)	>$25,000,000
EF4	14 deaths – See article on this tornado – At least 50 people were injured.							
EF0	W of Chaffee	Scott	MO	37.1800°N 89.7063°W	2110 – 2111	0.2 mi (320 m)	40 yd (37 m)	$0
EF0	A brief tornado observed by a storm spotter resulted in no damage.							
EF3	S of Polkville to N of Burns	Smith	MS	32.1397°N 89.6912°W	2127 – 2138	8.87 mi (14.27 km)	440 yd (400 m)	$700,000
EF3	This strong tornado touched down east-northeast of Daniel and moved to the east-northeast through the Bienville National Forest. One mobile home and two chicken houses were destroyed, two more mobile homes were moved off of their foundations, and a site-built home sustained roof damage. An 18-wheeler (truck and trailer) was picked up and thrown 300 feet (91 m) and many trees were downed as well before the tornado dissipated west of Lorena.							
EF1	ESE of Falkner	Tippah	MS	34.8109°N 88.7916°W	2140 – 2142	2.13 mi (3.43 km)	100 yd (91 m)	$30,000
EF1	A home and two mobile homes sustained minor damage, with a portion of a mobile home's roof and awning being ripped off northeast of Peoples. Several trees and a few telephone poles were downed as well.							
EF1	S of Harvest	Madison	AL	34.8138°N 86.7773°W	2140 – 2145	1.42 mi (2.29 km)	75 yd (69 m)	Unknown
EF1	Several houses sustained significant shingle damage, a brick home sustained structural damage, and an RV trailer was overturned. Many large trees and several fences were blown down as well.							
EF4	NNW of Eutaw to Tuscaloosa to NE of Fultondale	Greene, Tuscaloosa, Jefferson	AL	33.0297°N 87.9350°W	2143 – 2314	80.68 mi (129.84 km)	2,600 yd (2,400 m)	$2.4 billion
EF4	64 deaths – See article on this tornado – An estimated 1,500 people were injured.							
EF0	SE of Sullivan	Sullivan	IN	39.0842°N 87.3997°W	2144 – 2145	0.05 mi (80 m)	20 yd (18 m)	$20,500
EF0	A very brief tornado impacted one residence, where the roof was damaged, a bathroom window was blown out, and a trampoline was blown over. Roof debris was spread over the lawn, with some shingles being blown into a tree and a large piece of plywood being blown over a neighboring house and into a 40-foot (12 m) high tree.							
EF1	SE of Tanner to NNE of Madison	Limestone, Madison	AL	34.6655°N 86.9172°W	2153 – 2207	14.62 mi (23.53 km)	75 yd (69 m)	Unknown
EF1	Several homes sustained minor roof damage, and numerous trees were downed.							
EF1	E of Ridgeside	Hamilton	TN	35.0129°N 85.2144°W	2203 – 2208	3.8 mi (6.1 km)	125 yd (114 m)	$90,000
EF1	Several homes sustained minor to moderate roof damage and numerous trees were downed by this tornado as it tracked northward through neighborhoods just west of Chattanooga Metropolitan Airport.							
EF4	Fackler, AL to NE of Haletown, TN	Jackson (AL), Marion (TN)	AL, TN	34.7948°N 85.9090°W	2205 – 2231	30.24 mi (48.67 km)	1,320 yd (1,210 m)	>$30,000
EF4	1 death – See section on this tornado							
EF3	NE of Plevna, AL to SE of Elora, TN to ENE of Huntland, TN	Madison (AL), Lincoln (TN), Franklin (TN)	AL, TN	34.9830°N 86.3990°W	2205 – 2223	16.30 mi (26.23 km)	600 yd (550 m)	Unknown
EF3	This tornado was found in a 2022 re-analysis to be a separate portion of the initial 132.1-mile (212.6 km) track analysis from the Hackleburg–Phil Campbell tornado, in which the initial tornado dissipated in Madison County east of Harvest. The track was further refined in a 2024 reanalysis, in which the path was lengthened by a few miles and was determined to have started in extreme northeast Madison County northeast of Plevna. The tornado quickly crossed the state line and moved across areas south of Elora and Huntland, south of SR 122. More significant EF2 to low-end EF3-level damage began about 1.4 miles (2.3 km) south-southwest of Huntland. A cinder block building suffered damage to its flat adobe roof, with some of the blocks near the roof–around 20 feet (6.1 m) off the ground–pushed out. Nearby, a single-family cinder block construction home lost its roof, with another home about 1,000 feet (300 m) away losing over half its roof and being slightly shifted off its foundation, consistent with a high-end EF2 rating. A chicken house with metal girding near the home was completely flattened as well. To the east of Huntland, several structures at a farm complex were damaged, and a home and garage lost their roofs. A hay barn was destroyed, with a few hay bales blown 100–200 feet (30–61 m) away. Low-end EF3 damage was documented to a well-built cinder block utility building about 200 feet (61 m) south of the home, with most of the roof removed and over half of the downwind wall pushed outward. Nearby, another barn sustained minor roof damage, while the top half of the silo was blown away. An additional barn nearby was completely destroyed. Further east, heavy farm equipment was damaged and yet another barn sustained minor roof damage. Scattered trees were downed to the northeast, with 8-inch (200 mm) fence posts 18 inches (460 mm) deep pulled up as well. The tornado continued over 3 miles (4.8 km) across a ridge, dissipating over an inaccessible mountainous area.							
EF3	S of Newton to N of Hickory	Newton	MS	32.2882°N 89.1817°W	2208 – 2222	10.27 mi (16.53 km)	440 yd (400 m)	$1,100,000
EF3	The north end of a concrete road bridge was lifted and dropped back onto its supports, causing damage to the concrete sides, guard rails, and asphalt. Two wood-frame homes, a travel trailer, and a mobile home were destroyed, and two other homes sustained severe roof damage. Other homes were damaged, a metal shed was heavily damaged, and many trees were downed along the path as well.							
EF3	SSE of Hamilton to NE of Haleyville	Marion, Winston	AL	34.0289°N 87.9421°W	2210 – 2247	31.84 mi (51.24 km)	1,320 yd (1,210 m)	$17,000,000
EF3	See section on this tornado – 25 people were injured.							
EF2	SE of Counce	Hardin	TN	35.0248°N 88.2735°W	2211 – 2215	3.84 mi (6.18 km)	200 yd (180 m)	$1,800,000
EF2	At least 15 homes suffered moderate to major damage, and several others sustained minor damage. Two mobile homes, a pizza restaurant, and a hardware store were destroyed, and numerous trees and power lines were downed. Two people suffered minor injuries.							
EF0	NW of Ooltewah	Hamilton	TN	35.0986°N 85.0788°W	2212 – 2213	0.1 mi (160 m)	70 yd (64 m)	$10,000
EF0	A few trees and power lines were downed.							
EF1	Collegedale to NNE of Ooltewah	Hamilton	TN	35.0400°N 85.1000°W	2213 – 2219	4 mi (6.4 km)	90 yd (82 m)	$25,000
EF1	Many trees and power lines were downed.							
EF1	Ooltewah	Hamilton	TN	35.0681°N 85.0964°W	2214 – 2221	3.63 mi (5.84 km)	200 yd (180 m)	$100,000
EF1	Several homes sustained minor to moderate roof damage, and numerous trees were downed.							
EF0	S of Triangle	Stafford, Prince William	VA	38.5090°N 77.3440°W	2215 – 2222	3.32 mi (5.34 km)	50 yd (46 m)	Unknown
EF0	The tornado lofted debris in a wooded area in an inaccessible portion of Marine Corps Base Quantico.							
EF0	Ayres Hill	Potter	PA	41.7209°N 77.9871°W	2226 – 2228	1.85 mi (2.98 km)	25 yd (23 m)	$1,000
EF0	A very weak tornado downed trees on an intermittent path through a heavily wooded area.							
EF2	ENE of Cecilton to SE of Etowah	Bradley, Polk, McMinn	TN	35.0800°N 84.9500°W	2228 – 2305	27.95 mi (44.98 km)	250 yd (230 m)	$2,250,000
EF2	4 deaths – Several homes were either heavily damaged or destroyed, several more homes sustained roof damage, and many trees were downed. The four fatalities occurred in Bradley County.							
EF3	ENE of Livingston to Sawyerville to NE of West Blocton	Greene, Hale, Bibb	AL	32.6152°N 88.0543°W	2230 – 2355	72.13 mi (116.08 km)	1,760 yd (1,610 m)	$36,000,000
EF3	7 deaths – See article on this tornado – At least 52 people were injured.							
EF0	Northeastern Cleveland	Bradley	TN	35.1802°N 84.8675°W	2235 – 2237	1 mi (1.6 km)	50 yd (46 m)	$20,000
EF0	Numerous trees were downed.							
EF4	Raleigh, MS to Enterprise, MS to N of Uniontown, AL	Smith (MS), Jasper (MS), Clarke (MS), Choctaw (AL), Sumter (AL), Marengo (AL), Perry (AL)	MS, AL	32.0296°N 89.5042°W	2242 – 0135	122.04 mi (196.40 km)	1,050 yd (960 m)	$26,913,000
EF4	7 deaths – See article on this tornado – 17 people were injured.							
EF0	NW of Nellieburg to NW of Topton	Lauderdale	MS	32.4200°N 88.8083°W	2245 – 2259	11.52 mi (18.54 km)	100 yd (91 m)	$150,000
EF0	More than a dozen homes sustained minor roof damage, a barn lost most of its tin roof, and many trees were downed, one of which fell on a mobile home.							
EF1	NE of Farmville	Prince Edward, Cumberland	VA	37.2916°N 78.3689°W	2255 – 2305	5.54 mi (8.92 km)	100 yd (91 m)	$45,000
EF1	Several homes sustained roof damage, and numerous trees were downed.							
EF0	SW of Gruetli-Laager	Grundy	TN	35.3495°N 85.6600°W	2257 – 2258	0.96 mi (1.54 km)	50 yd (46 m)	$9,000
EF0	An outbuilding sustained roof damage and several trees were snapped northeast of Coalmont. The time and path length were adjusted slightly following a 2024 reanalysis by the National Weather Service in Nashville, Tennessee.							
EF0	SW of Etowah	McMinn	TN	35.2899°N 84.5504°W	2300 – 2302	2.3 mi (3.7 km)	50 yd (46 m)	$10,000
EF0	A few trees were downed.							
EF0	Friendly	Prince George's	MD	38.7460°N 76.9590°W	2306 – 2307	0.39 mi (0.63 km)	75 yd (69 m)	$100,000
EF0	Six aircraft suffered minor to major damage at Potomac Airfield, including a Cessna 182 Skylane that was tossed 120 feet (37 m) across the taxiway, a Cessna 172 that was lifted up and smashed nose first into the ground, and a Cessna Skymaster that was tossed about 25 feet (7.6 m) and smashed along the ground.							
EF3	W of Hubbertville to S of Bazemore	Fayette	AL	33.8129°N 87.8108°W	2306 – 2314	7.96 mi (12.81 km)	880 yd (800 m)	$3,000,000
EF3	Two homes were destroyed, and several barns and outbuildings were either damaged or destroyed. Hundreds of trees were downed as well.							
EF0	ESE of Birchwood	Meigs	TN	35.3480°N 84.9210°W	2307 – 2308	0.75 mi (1.21 km)	110 yd (100 m)	$15,000
EF0	Several trees were downed just south of the Hiwassee River.							
EF2	W of Jalapa to NNE of Tellico Plains	Monroe	TN	35.3500°N 84.4000°W	2308 – 2318	10.5 mi (16.9 km)	200 yd (180 m)	$500,000
EF2	The top of a two-story building was blown off, several homes were either damaged or destroyed, and a trailer was destroyed. Numerous trees were downed as well. One person was injured.							
EF1	SE of Madisonville (1st tornado)	Monroe	TN	35.4400°N 84.4200°W	2310 – 2321	11.4 mi (18.3 km)	200 yd (180 m)	$25,000
EF1	Numerous trees were downed.							
EF0	N of Clinton	Prince George's	MD	38.7823°N 76.9123°W	2312 – 2313	0.73 mi (1.17 km)	50 yd (46 m)	$100,000
EF0	A few homes sustained siding and shingle damage, and many trees were downed, several of which fell on cars.							
EF0	Camp Springs	Prince George's	MD	38.8100°N 76.9020°W	2316 – 2317	0.39 mi (630 m)	100 yd (91 m)	$5,000
EF0	Homes sustained roof and siding damage and numerous trees were downed on a path that crossed into the west side of Joint Base Andrews.							
EF5	Lakeview, AL to Rainsville, AL to Rising Fawn, GA	DeKalb (AL), Dade (GA)	AL, GA	34.3907°N 85.9784°W	2319 – 2355	36.63 mi (58.95 km)	1,320 yd (1,210 m)	>$150,000
EF5	25 deaths – See article on this tornado – The number of injuries is unknown.							
EF1	NE of Goochland	Goochland, Louisa	VA	37.7099°N 77.8192°W	2325 – 2330	2.1 mi (3.4 km)	100 yd (91 m)	$26,000
EF1	Numerous trees were either knocked down or sheared off.							
EF4	SE of Clay, AL to Ohatchee, AL to Cave Spring, GA to SW of Kingston, GA	Jefferson (AL), St. Clair (AL), Calhoun (AL), Etowah (AL), Cherokee (AL), Polk (GA), Floyd (GA), Bartow (GA)	AL, GA	33.6792°N 86.5699°W	2328 – 0115	97.33 mi (156.64 km)	1,760 yd (1,610 m)	$366,755,000
EF4	22 deaths – See article on this tornado – 85 people were injured.							
EF4	W of Chilhowee Lake to N of Cades Cove	Monroe, Blount	TN	35.5324°N 84.0504°W	2331 – 2345	14.45 mi (23.26 km)	1,320 yd (1,210 m)	$1,050,000
EF4	This violent wedge tornado moved across Chilhowee Lake and ripped a large metal TVA transmission tower from its concrete footings. It moved through densely forested areas in the Cherokee National Forest and Great Smoky Mountains National Park, where thousands of large trees were mowed down and debarked along a near mile-wide path. Several other electrical transmission towers were also destroyed along the path before the tornado lifted north of Cades Cove.							
EF0	NE of Athens	McMinn	TN	35.4700°N 84.5200°W	2335 – 2336	0.7 mi (1.1 km)	20 yd (18 m)	$5,000
EF0	A few trees were snapped.							
EF1	SSW of Hogglesville to E of Mertz	Hale, Bibb	AL	32.8478°N 87.4922°W	2350 – 0002	8.62 mi (13.87 km)	300 yd (270 m)	$625,000
EF1	The tornado touched down in Hale County to the north-northeast of Greensboro and moved into the Talladega National Forest, damaging a mobile home and a business in Wateroak. Many trees were downed in the area as well. In Bibb County, it downed many more trees before dissipating along SR 25 west of Brent.							
EF0	W of Greenback	Loudon	TN	35.6600°N 84.1900°W	0000 – 0002	1 mi (1.6 km)	50 yd (46 m)	$10,000
EF0	Several trees were downed.							
EF1	S of Campbell	Steuben	NY	42.2100°N 77.2000°W	0004 – 0009	4.62 mi (7.44 km)	150 yd (140 m)	$150,000
EF1	Two homes sustained roof and siding damage, a barn was moved off its cement foundation, with the roof and two walls sustaining major damage and shingles being blown off, and a large camper was moved about 6 inches (15 cm). Hundreds of trees were downed along the path, some in large swaths.							
EF0	NE of West Point	Cullman	AL	34.2846°N 86.9189°W	0009 – 0013	1.19 mi (1.92 km)	100 yd (91 m)	Unknown
EF0	A short-lived tornado near I-65 caused porch damage to a house and downed numerous trees.							
EF0	SW of Louisville to NNE of McGhee Tyson Airport	Blount	TN	35.8000°N 84.0600°W	0009 – 0015	6.5 mi (10.5 km)	200 yd (180 m)	$10,000
EF0	Several trees were downed.							
EF4	SW of Ringgold, GA to Cleveland, TN to S of Athens, TN	Catoosa (GA), Hamilton (TN), Bradley (TN), Polk (TN), McMinn (TN)	GA, TN	34.8744°N 85.1785°W	0015 – 0107	48 mi (77 km)	800 yd (730 m)	$68,250,000
EF4	20 deaths – See article on this tornado – 335 people were injured.							
EF1	NW of Montevallo	Bibb, Shelby	AL	33.1169°N 87.0081°W	0032 – 0038	5.41 mi (8.71 km)	50 yd (46 m)	$20,000
EF1	Many trees were downed in the Marvel area.							
EF2	WNW of Halifax to NE of Nathalie	Halifax	VA	36.7825°N 79.0945°W	0038 – 0108	18.1 mi (29.1 km)	350 yd (320 m)	Unknown
EF2	1 death – Four homes/mobile homes were destroyed, fourteen sustained major damage, and six received minor damage. A large camper trailer and an outbuilding were destroyed, and many trees were downed as well. Eight people were injured.							
EF0	White Pine	Jefferson	TN	36.0844°N 83.3351°W	0046 – 0050	3.3 mi (5.3 km)	50 yd (46 m)	$20,000
EF0	A few homes sustained minor roof damage, and several trees were downed in the southern part of town.							
EF1	ESE of Cedar Fork	Caroline	VA	37.9378°N 77.5228°W	0055 – 0100	0.24 mi (390 m)	100 yd (91 m)	$15,000
EF1	Numerous trees were downed.							
EF1	Southern Knoxville	Knox	TN	35.9200°N 83.9700°W	0057 – 0058	1 mi (1.6 km)	50 yd (46 m)	$20,000
EF1	Numerous trees were downed along the path just west of US 129 and about two miles (3.2 km) southwest of the University of Tennessee.							
EF0	SE of Seymour	Sevier	TN	35.8534°N 83.7159°W	0106 – 0107	0.5 mi (800 m)	50 yd (46 m)	$5,000
EF0	A few trees were downed.							
EF4	SW of Dunlap to Spring City	Sequatchie, Bledsoe, Rhea	TN	35.3400°N 85.4200°W	0106 – 0141	40.16 mi (64.63 km)	880 yd (800 m)	$17,250,000
EF4	4 deaths – See section on this tornado - Twelve people were injured by the tornado.							
EF0	NW of Mosheim	Greene	TN	36.2255°N 83.0570°W	0107 – 0108	0.5 mi (800 m)	70 yd (64 m)	$5,000
EF0	A few trees were downed just north of I-81 and Volunteer Speedway.							
EF0	NE of Jefferson City	Jefferson	TN	36.1370°N 83.4774°W	0111 – 0112	0.3 mi (480 m)	50 yd (46 m)	$20,000
EF0	A few homes sustained minor roof damage and trees were downed on the northeast outskirts of Jefferson City.							
EF4	N of Wetumpka to WNW of LaFayette	Elmore, Tallapoosa, Chambers	AL	32.6174°N 86.1930°W	0112 – 0209	44.18 mi (71.10 km)	880 yd (800 m)	$167,000,000
EF4	7 deaths – See section on this tornado – 30 people were injured.							
EF1	S of Vincent to Logan Martin Lake	Shelby, Talladega	AL	33.3507°N 86.4013°W	0115 – 0124	8.59 mi (13.82 km)	200 yd (180 m)	$1,044,000
EF1	Many trees were downed, several of which fell on homes, causing minor damage.							
EF0	NW of Tellico Plains (1st tornado)	Monroe	TN	35.3900°N 84.3500°W	0118 – 0119	0.9 mi (1.4 km)	50 yd (46 m)	$5,000
EF0	A few trees were downed.							
EF1	SE of Madisonville (2nd tornado)	Monroe	TN	35.4400°N 84.4100°W	0120 – 0131	11 mi (18 km)	200 yd (180 m)	$25,000
EF1	Numerous trees were downed.							
EF3	NW of Cassville to SW of Talking Rock	Bartow, Cherokee, Pickens	GA	34.2703°N 84.8674°W	0120 – 0149	23.05 mi (37.10 km)	880 yd (800 m)	$23,350,000
EF3	This strong tornado associated with the Tuscaloosa–Birmingham, Alabama supercell touched down northeast of Kingston and moved northeast across Bartow County, destroying 40 homes and several outbuildings and causing minor damage to 240 additional homes. A truck was pushed into a swimming pool at one of the destroyed homes. Several chicken houses were destroyed as well as the tornado moved through the I-75 area. It then tracked briefly through the northwestern corner of Cherokee County, where eleven structures sustained major damage and ten more received minor damage, before it crossed into Pickens County, completely destroying 26 mobile homes, site-built homes, and businesses, inflicting major damage to 15 structures, and causing minor damage to 35 more structures. The tornado lifted just east of Hinton, about seven miles (11 km) west of Jasper. Hundreds of trees and many power lines were downed by the tornado, which caused 25 injuries in Bartow County and one in Pickens County.							
EF0	NW of Tellico Plains (2nd tornado)	Monroe	TN	35.3800°N 84.3400°W	0122 – 0124	1.75 mi (2.82 km)	50 yd (46 m)	$5,000
EF0	A few trees were downed.							
EF0	NW of Dandridge	Jefferson	TN	36.0540°N 83.4889°W	0124 – 0125	0.8 mi (1.3 km)	50 yd (46 m)	$5,000
EF0	A weak tornado at the Patriot Hills Golf Course downed a few trees.							
EF1	NE of Englewood to E of Madisonville	McMinn, Monroe	TN	35.4500°N 84.4600°W	0125 – 0136	12.5 mi (20.1 km)	200 yd (180 m)	$300,000
EF1	Several homes were damaged and numerous trees and power lines were downed. One person was injured.							
EF1	NW of Spring City	Rhea	TN	35.6970°N 84.8790°W	0128 – 0133	1.5 mi (2.4 km)	75 yd (69 m)	$10,000
EF1	A few trees were downed in the western and northern parts of Spring City.							
EF2	E of Dunlap	Sequatchie	TN	35.3600°N 85.3900°W	0128 – 0135	4.5 mi (7.2 km)	250 yd (230 m)	$200,000
EF2	The roof was blown off a building, and a few homes were damaged. Many trees and power lines were downed as well. This tornado followed a few minutes behind the 0106 UTC Sequatchie–Bledsoe EF4 tornado.							
EF2	S of Fall Branch	Greene, Washington	TN	36.2900°N 82.7000°W	0129 – 0137	8.8 mi (14.2 km)	150 yd (140 m)	$800,000
EF2	One home was destroyed, and several other homes were damaged, some of which had their entire roofs removed. Many trees were downed along the path.							
EF0	ENE of Sevierville	Sevier, Jefferson	TN	35.9086°N 83.3335°W	0131 – 0133	1.1 mi (1.8 km)	200 yd (180 m)	$8,000
EF0	Numerous trees were downed in the McGaha Hollow area.							
EF1	W of Newport	Cocke	TN	35.9540°N 83.2860°W	0133 – 0148	7.1 mi (11.4 km)	150 yd (140 m)	$100,000
EF1	The tornado touched down near the Jefferson County line and moved eastward into Newport, damaging a hospital and downing numerous trees.							
EF2	NW of Calderwood	Monroe	TN	35.5094°N 84.0673°W	0135 – 0139	3.7 mi (6.0 km)	440 yd (400 m)	$100,000
EF2	Heavy tree damage occurred in the Cherokee National Forest west of Chilhowee Lake on a path less than a mile south of the 2331 UTC Chilhowee Lake EF4 tornado.							
EF0	Chilhowee Lake to N of Cades Cove	Monroe, Blount	TN	35.5467°N 84.0274°W	0140 – 0150	13.2 mi (21.2 km)	440 yd (400 m)	$10,000
EF0	This tornado moved across Chilhowee Lake and downed several trees in the Cades Cove area on a path similar to the 2331 UTC Chilhowee Lake EF4 tornado.							
EF0	E of Greenback	Blount	TN	35.6300°N 84.1300°W	0143 – 0149	3.8 mi (6.1 km)	100 yd (91 m)	$10,000
EF0	A weak tornado downed several trees.							
EF1	SSE of Marion	Perry	AL	32.5519°N 87.3142°W	0150 – 0153	4.24 mi (6.82 km)	100 yd (91 m)	$1,300,000
EF1	A house sustained roof damage, two barns were damaged, an outbuilding was destroyed, and many trees were downed.							
EF0	N of Bristol	Washington	VA	36.6502°N 82.2034°W	0204 – 0205	0.5 mi (0.80 km)	50 yd (46 m)	$3,000
EF0	Many trees were downed along Reedy Creek.							
EF2	SE of Fort Payne	DeKalb	AL	34.4059°N 85.7294°W	0205 – 0210	6.47 mi (10.41 km)	250 yd (230 m)	Unknown
EF2	A strong tornado just outside of Fort Payne collapsed two small barns, damaged a third barn, and leveled a large metal farm building. In addition, a house was damaged, four power poles were snapped off, and many trees were downed, some of which landed on houses.							
EF1	SE of Abingdon	Washington	VA	36.6800°N 81.9800°W	0213 – 0217	3.9 mi (6.3 km)	100 yd (91 m)	$75,000
EF1	Numerous trees were downed.							
EF1	SE of White Plains to E of Five Points	Chambers	AL	32.9719°N 85.3688°W	0219 – 0228	5.24 mi (8.43 km)	150 yd (140 m)	$5,000
EF1	A house sustained major damage, and many trees were downed.							
EF0	Farragut	Knox	TN	35.8700°N 84.2000°W	0228 – 0229	1 mi (1.6 km)	50 yd (46 m)	$10,000
EF0	Several trees were downed.							
EF1	NE of Five Points	Chambers	AL	33.0158°N 85.2938°W	0229 – 0238	5.01 mi (8.06 km)	100 yd (91 m)	$10,000
EF1	An outbuilding sustained minor roof damage, and many trees were knocked down or sheared off.							
EF3	SE of Suches to Mountain City	Lumpkin, White, Habersham, Rabun	GA	34.6656°N 83.9427°W	0230 – 0316	36.99 mi (59.53 km)	900 yd (820 m)	>$5,850,000
EF3	1 death – See section on this tornado.							
EF0	NE of Hartford	Cocke	TN	35.8202°N 83.1319°W	0232 – 0234	2.4 mi (3.9 km)	40 yd (37 m)	$20,000
EF0	An outbuilding was destroyed, and several trees were downed.							
EF1	NE of Tom Town	Cocke	TN	35.8502°N 83.0225°W	0237 – 0238	1.2 mi (1.9 km)	150 yd (140 m)	$30,000
EF1	Numerous trees were downed.							
EF0	NW of Hot Springs	Madison	NC	35.9145°N 82.9014°W	0245 – 0246	0.07 mi (110 m)	50 yd (46 m)	Unknown
EF0	A very brief tornado embedded in a larger downburst destroyed a shed, tossed a second, and peeled the roof from an outbuilding along US 25/US 70. Several large trees were downed as well, one of which clipped a home.							
EF1	NNW of LaGrange to SW of Newnan	Troup, Heard, Coweta	GA	33.1386°N 85.0878°W	0245 – 0310	17.02 mi (27.39 km)	100 yd (91 m)	$1,800,000
EF1	The tornado touched down on the north side of the Chattahoochee River/West Point Lake, tracking northeast and downing thousands of trees and some power lines. In Heard County, a horse trailer and another trailer were damaged as they were both thrown about 20 feet (6.1 m) from their original location. Three homes and/or businesses were destroyed, with two others suffering major damage and an additional ten others sustaining minor damage. One of the homes lost two exterior walls and its roof. Thousands of trees were downed along the path in Heard County. In Coweta County, one home sustained major damage, a second home and several fences and outbuildings sustained minor damage, and thousands more trees were downed before the tornado lifted northwest of Grantville. One person was injured in Heard County.							
EF1	Nokesville to Bristow	Prince William	VA	38.6590°N 77.5920°W	0246 – 0301	5.78 mi (9.30 km)	125 yd (114 m)	$15,000
EF1	Siding and shingles were removed from several homes, storage sheds and horse run-in sheds were damaged, and doors were blown in on a detached garage. A fence and some signs were damaged, and numerous trees were downed as well.							
EF0	Houston Valley	Greene	TN	36.0106°N 82.8706°W	0247 – 0249	2.3 mi (3.7 km)	300 yd (270 m)	$15,000
EF0	A few trees were downed. The tornado was forced to lift because of steep terrain but touched back down later as the EF3 Camp Creek tornado.							
EF0	NNW of Verbena	Chilton	AL	32.7759°N 86.5429°W	0248 – 0250	1.91 mi (3.07 km)	50 yd (46 m)	$102,000
EF0	A metal carport and the roof of a mobile home were damaged, and many trees were downed. One person was injured.							
EF3	SW of Camp Creek to Mount Carmel	Greene, Washington	TN	36.0350°N 82.8080°W	0251 – 0308	15.8 mi (25.4 km)	1,500 yd (1,400 m)	$8,010,000
EF3	6 deaths – Many structures were destroyed, including at least 75 homes and mobile homes. Some of the homes were leveled. Numerous trees were snapped and uprooted and many barns and outbuildings were destroyed, in addition to one public building. More than 100 other homes were damaged. This tornado was spawned by the same supercell that produced the Ringgold, Georgia, EF4 tornado. Approximately 220 people were injured. The same general area was struck by another EF3 tornado about two hours later.							
EF1	N of Richwood	Nicholas	WV	38.2953°N 80.5271°W	0258 – 0300	0.98 mi (1.58 km)	100 yd (91 m)	$21,000
EF1	A high-end EF1 tornado skipped along the side of a mountain at about 2,300 to 2,400 feet (700 to 730 m) above sea level, blowing down or snapping off trees, a few of which fell on and damaged a camper and a few trucks. This was the first confirmed tornado in Nicholas County since 1969.							
EF0	Panther Creek State Park	Hamblen	TN	36.2108°N 83.4218°W	0314 – 0315	0.3 mi (480 m)	80 yd (73 m)	$30,000
EF0	Several trees were downed in the park.							
EF2	SE of Lagrange	Troup	GA	32.9684°N 85.0301°W	0320 – 0330	6.73 mi (10.83 km)	440 yd (400 m)	$10,000,000
EF2	This tornado destroyed 15 homes and damaged 50 others. The most significant damage occurred about two miles (3.2 km) south of the Lagrange city limits, where twelve homes were destroyed, one of which was blown about 50 feet (15 m) off of its foundation (the attached sunroom was thrown 300 yards (270 m)). A well-built log cabin was blown off of its hillside foundation and destroyed as well. Thousands of trees and many power lines were downed along the path. Six people were injured. The same supercell would go on to produce the 0359 UTC EF3 tornado in Meriwether County.							
EF0	Reston	Fairfax	VA	38.9520°N 77.3450°W	0325 – 0328	1.12 mi (1.80 km)	75 yd (69 m)	$40,000
EF0	Numerous trees and tree limbs were downed in neighborhoods, in a parking lot, and on a golf course. A few homes sustained minor damage from the fallen trees.							
EF2	Doeville to N of Mountain City	Johnson	TN	36.3900°N 81.9900°W	0345 – 0356	12 mi (19 km)	250 yd (230 m)	$1,000,000
EF2	2 deaths – A strong tornado touched down near the Butler community and moved northeast, with homes and other buildings being destroyed, and numerous trees being downed along the path. One fatality occurred in Butler, and the other occurred in the Doe Valley area.							
EF2	NW of Pine Mountain Valley to NW of Thomaston	Harris, Meriweather, Upson	GA	32.8200°N 84.8500°W	0355 – 0424	24.5 mi (39.4 km)	1,320 yd (1,210 m)	$8,500,000
EF2	This tornado touched down just south of Pine Mountain and moved northeast through F. D. Roosevelt State Park, where about 40 percent of the structures in the park's campground, including a large assembly structure, sustained moderate to major damage and thousands of trees were downed. In total, two structures sustained major damage and thirteen received minor damage in Harris County. Further along the path, several homes, barns, and outbuildings were either damaged or destroyed in Meriwether County, and in Upson County, two structures were destroyed, four sustained major damage, and six suffered minor damage. Thousands of trees and several power lines were downed along the path as well. The supercell associated with this storm would also produce the 0438 UTC EF3 tornado in Pike County.							
EF3	Alvaton to Vaughn to SSE of Hampton	Meriwether, Spalding, Henry	GA	33.1663°N 84.5806°W	0359 – 0428	21.68 mi (34.89 km)	880 yd (800 m)	$25,400,000
EF3	2 deaths – Several hundred trees and some power lines were downed, and outbuildings sustained minor structural damage in Meriwether County. More severe damage occurred in Spalding County, especially in Vaughn, Birdie, and Sunny Side, where 400 structures, mainly homes and businesses, were affected: 45 were destroyed, 280 sustained major damage, and 75 received minor damage. Thousands of trees and dozens of power lines were mowed down in Spalding County as well. In Henry County, a few buildings sustained minor structural damage, and more trees and power lines were downed before the tornado lifted. The two fatalities occurred in a destroyed mobile home in southwest Spalding County. This supercell also spawned the 0320 UTC EF2 tornado in Troup County.							
EF1	W of Whitetop	Washington	VA	36.6150°N 81.6640°W	0405 – 0406	0.5 mi (0.80 km)	200 yd (180 m)	$50,000
EF1	Numerous trees were downed along the Virginia Creeper Trail.							
EF1	WSW of Troutdale	Smyth	VA	36.6840°N 81.5410°W	0413 – 0414	0.41 mi (660 m)	300 yd (270 m)	Unknown
EF1	A brief tornado moved through Grindstone Campground in the Mount Rogers National Recreation Area, damaging a bath house and either snapping or uprooting over 200 trees.							
EF0	Scaly Mountain	Macon	NC	35.0199°N 83.3064°W	0431 – 0432	0.24 mi (390 m)	30 yd (27 m)	Unknown
EF0	A brief, intermittent tornado flipped a mobile home and downed numerous trees.							
EF3	SSW of Meansville to northwestern Barnesville to SE of Flovilla	Pike, Lamar, Monroe, Butts	GA	32.9958°N 84.3210°W	0438 – 0517	30.82 mi (49.60 km)	1,056 yd (966 m)	$15,040,000
EF3	2 deaths – See Section on this tornado - at least 22 people were injured by this tornado.							
EF3	NE of Camp Creek to S of Jonesborough	Greene, Washington	TN	36.1060°N 82.7020°W	0440 – 0456	13.6 mi (21.9 km)	1,000 yd (910 m)	$8,000,000
EF3	2 deaths – This high-end EF3 tornado touched down southwest of Horse Creek. It either damaged or destroyed 55 homes and destroyed 10 mobile homes and multiple barns, with 25 farms having structures either damaged or destroyed. Some of the homes were leveled. Vehicles were tossed, and many trees were downed, with sheet metal roofing being wrapped around trees that remained standing. This tornado paralleled and then crossed the path of the Camp Creek EF3 tornado from about two hours earlier. 70 people were injured.							

=== April 28 event ===
Confirmed tornadoes by Enhanced Fujita rating
EFU	EF0	EF1	EF2	EF3	EF4	EF5	Total
0	18	23	5	1	0	0	47

List of confirmed tornadoes – Thursday, April 28, 2011
EF#	Location	County / Parish	State	Start Coord.	Time (UTC)	Path length	Max width	Damage
EF3	NE of Bristol to N of Chilhowie	Washington, Smyth	VA	36.6500°N 81.9500°W	0501 – 0520	19.63 mi (31.59 km)	1,320 yd (1,210 m)	$5,750,000
EF3	3 deaths – Extensive damage occurred to homes and businesses in the town of Glade Spring as the tornado moved through Washington County, with a truck stop along I-81 being destroyed. Semi-trucks were thrown at the truck stop, with one being tossed into the side of a restaurant. Additionally, a small church was destroyed, and damage occurred to the pavement on I-81, possibly from tractor-trailers falling on the road surface. Moving into Smyth County, five site-built homes sustained significant structural damage, three mobile homes were overturned, and several other buildings sustained moderate roof damage before the tornado dissipated. Many trees were downed along the path. In addition to the fatalities, there were 50 injuries and an indirect fatality, which resulted from a car accident related to the tornado.							
EF1	W of Newborn to NW of Greensboro	Newton, Morgan, Greene	GA	33.5125°N 83.7117°W	0511 – 0540	25.21 mi (40.57 km)	880 yd (800 m)	$8,150,000
EF1	In Newton County, in and around the city of Newborn, one home was destroyed, five others suffered major damage, and ten more sustained minor damage. Moving into Morgan County, several dozen homes were heavily damaged, many around Madison, a shopping center lost parts of its roof, and several mobile homes sustained moderate to major damage, including three that were flipped over. In total, in Morgan County, 18 homes and/or businesses were destroyed, 37 suffered major damage, and another 128 sustained minor damage, for a total of 183 affected structures. In Greene County, one home was destroyed, one suffered major damage, and six more homes sustained minor damage. Thousands of trees were downed along the path of the tornado.							
EF2	W of Erin	Chemung	NY	42.1800°N 76.7000°W	0523 – 0525	0.86 mi (1.38 km)	300 yd (270 m)	$575,000
EF2	A well-constructed barn, a garage, and a mobile home were completely destroyed, with lighter debris from the mobile home being carried several miles. A site-built home had its windows blown out, with debris found impaled into its siding and yard, and three nearby vehicles were damaged, with a beam from the destroyed barn being impaled through the dashboard of one. Additionally, an 11,000-pound (5,000 kg) camper was flipped up over a 5-foot (1.5 m) fence, landing on its side; numerous trees were downed; and two horses were killed.							
EF0	NNE of Town Creek	Allegany	MD	39.5550°N 78.5400°W	0527 – 0528	0.55 mi (0.89 km)	75 yd (69 m)	$10,000
EF0	Numerous trees were downed, one of which landed on a home.							
EF0	WSW of Little Orleans	Allegany	MD	39.6010°N 78.4790°W	0535 – 0536	0.55 mi (890 m)	75 yd (69 m)	$5,000
EF0	Numerous trees were topped or completely uprooted in Green Ridge State Forest.							
EF0	NE of Gala	Botetourt	VA	37.7476°N 79.7400°W	0539 – 0541	1.62 mi (2.61 km)	125 yd (114 m)	$5,000
EF0	An intermittent tornado downed numerous trees.							
EF1	NW of Danby	Tompkins	NY	42.3700°N 76.5200°W	0541 – 0545	2.06 mi (3.32 km)	150 yd (140 m)	$125,000
EF1	A tornado just south of Ithaca collapsed an outbuilding, caused roof damage to a barn, and downed many trees, one of which landed on a home, causing roof damage. In addition, the same house had a window blown out, and a nearby car had a small tree branch impaled into the windshield.							
EF2	W of Genoa to NW of Harrisville	Rockingham, Shenandoah	VA	38.6540°N 78.9620°W	0612 – 0641	33.51 mi (53.93 km)	400 yd (370 m)	$450,000
EF2	A mobile home was destroyed, and roofs were removed from homes and barns in Rockingham County. More roofs were torn off in Shenandoah County, and a half-ton piece of industrial equipment was picked up and tossed 200 yards (180 m). Numerous trees were downed along the path through both counties.							
EF1	E of Buffalo Gap to W of Churchville	Augusta	VA	38.1790°N 79.2150°W	0617 – 0623	4.01 mi (6.45 km)	150 yd (140 m)	$100,000
EF1	Several homes sustained roof and structural damage, outbuildings were destroyed, and numerous trees were downed.							
EF1	E of Broad Top City	Huntingdon	PA	40.2012°N 78.1405°W	0620 – 0625	2.85 mi (4.59 km)	50 yd (46 m)	$10,000
EF1	Numerous pine trees were uprooted, and two homes sustained minor damage.							
EF1	SE of Eatonton	Putnam, Hancock	GA	33.2288°N 83.3138°W	0630 – 0705	6.74 mi (10.85 km)	200 yd (180 m)	$1,015,000
EF1	The tornado tracked across Lake Sinclair, with four homes being either heavily damaged or destroyed near the lake and the eastern border of Putnam County, mostly due to uprooted large trees falling on the structures. An outbuilding had its roof completely lifted off as well. In Hancock County, a few homes near the lake sustained minor structural damage. Dozens of trees and several power lines were downed along the path of the tornado as well.							
EF1	E of East Waterford to Spruce Hill Township	Juniata	PA	40.3800°N 77.5896°W	0653 – 0700	8.46 mi (13.62 km)	100 yd (91 m)	$25,000
EF1	A farm in Honey Grove was hardest hit, with the roof of the farmhouse and several barns and sheds being destroyed. A few other barns sustained roof and structural damage, and numerous trees were downed.							
EF1	SSE of Linville	Rockingham	VA	38.5020°N 78.8380°W	0701 – 0702	0.86 mi (1.38 km)	50 yd (46 m)	$50,000
EF1	Numerous large trees were downed near a horse farm.							
EF2	Pharsalia	Chenango	NY	42.5510°N 75.7730°W	0720 – 0730	7.37 mi (11.86 km)	400 yd (370 m)	$625,000
EF2	A house trailer was lifted and demolished, a two-story barn and several outbuildings were destroyed, and a Jeep was moved several feet and hit with debris. Hundreds of trees were downed along the path, and a small pond had its water sucked out.							
EF1	SE of Lenoir	Caldwell	NC	35.8470°N 81.4320°W	0722 – 0730	4.45 mi (7.16 km)	400 yd (370 m)	Unknown
EF1	A double-wide manufactured home was mostly destroyed, along with several sheds and outbuildings, and two site-built homes and another mobile home sustained partial roof loss. One of the houses had its porch destroyed, and another had its gutters blown off and its carport blown away. Numerous trees were downed along the path. One person sustained minor injuries.							
EF1	W of Taylorsville	Alexander	NC	35.9090°N 81.3220°W	0733 – 0740	4.32 mi (6.95 km)	75 yd (69 m)	Unknown
EF1	Two outbuildings were destroyed, with several more at a farmstead sustaining roof and siding damage, and a residence had a portion of its roof removed and parts of a porch blown over the house. Additionally, a mobile home was pushed off of its foundation, roofing was peeled off a barn, and many trees were downed.							
EF1	SW of Norwood to NE of Camak	Warren	GA	33.4319°N 82.7598°W	0739 – 0751	7.76 mi (12.49 km)	440 yd (400 m)	$1,000,000
EF1	Hundreds of trees and several power lines were downed, and eight homes sustained moderate to major structural damage, mostly from fallen large trees.							
EF0	NE of Strasburg to N of Middletown	Shenandoah, Frederick	VA	39.0010°N 78.3360°W	0745 – 0749	4.28 mi (6.89 km)	175 yd (160 m)	$25,000
EF0	The roof was removed from a pole barn, shingles were removed from a house, and many trees were downed.							
EF1	SE of Harrisonburg	Rockingham	VA	38.3880°N 78.8650°W	0755 – 0758	2.63 mi (4.23 km)	150 yd (140 m)	$75,000
EF1	Two homes and two barns sustained roof damage, a metal shed was knocked down, and a livestock trailer was moved several feet. Numerous trees were downed as well.							
EF1	SE of McDonough	Chenango	NY	42.4355°N 75.7333°W	0758 – 0803	3.39 mi (5.46 km)	150 yd (140 m)	$75,000
EF1	A couple of homes were damaged, and hundreds of trees were downed in a heavily wooded area.							
EF1	NW of Columbus	Chenango	NY	42.7072°N 75.3980°W	0858 – 0900	3.47 mi (5.58 km)	100 yd (91 m)	$50,000
EF1	The second story of a horse barn was blown off, and many trees were downed along the path.							
EF1	Frankfort	Herkimer	NY	43.0218°N 75.1822°W	0904 – 0907	2.88 mi (4.63 km)	250 yd (230 m)	Unknown
EF1	One house sustained significant structural damage, several more homes had roof and siding damage, and a garage was moved off of its foundation. Numerous trees were downed.							
EF0	S of Herrick Center	Susquehanna	PA	41.7300°N 75.5100°W	0950 – 0955	1.03 mi (1.66 km)	80 yd (73 m)	$40,000
EF0	An intermittent tornado downed several trees and ripped the roof off a mobile home, throwing it about 100 yards (91 m).							
EF1	NE of Marianna	Jackson	FL	30.8300°N 85.1800°W	0950 – 0959	3.03 mi (4.88 km)	150 yd (140 m)	$500,000
EF1	An intermittent tornado touched down at the Marianna Municipal Airport, where seven Cessna aircraft were severely damaged or destroyed. Several homes to the east were damaged, and several trees were snapped as well.							
EF2	WSW of Lewisberry	York	PA	40.1062°N 76.9265°W	0955 – 1000	2.62 mi (4.22 km)	100 yd (91 m)	$50,000
EF2	This tornado touched down at Roundtop Mountain Resort, damaging several buildings, including one steel building that housed equipment for the ski patrol, and destroying a shed. Moving north-northeast, the tornado collapsed and twisted a metal high-voltage transmission tower and downed many trees, one of which fell on and destroyed a portion of a house.							
EF1	Palmyra	Lebanon	PA	40.2950°N 76.6069°W	1020 – 1023	1.92 mi (3.09 km)	100 yd (91 m)	$10,000
EF1	The tornado ripped a roof off an apartment house and tossed debris into a car dealership across the street, damaging vehicles in the lot. Nearby homes sustained roof damage, and a back porch was ripped from one home and thrown a half-block away. Several trees were downed along the path.							
EF2	W of Ono	Lebanon	PA	40.4041°N 76.5589°W	1030 – 1033	1.07 mi (1.72 km)	200 yd (180 m)	$15,000
EF2	Four homes sustained minor to moderate damage, six barns and outbuildings were either damaged or destroyed, along with a silo, and two metal high-tension power poles were knocked down. About 200 trees and several power poles were downed, and a cow was injured.							
EF0	Northern Poolesville	Montgomery	MD	39.1520°N 77.4200°W	1045 – 1047	0.76 mi (1.22 km)	50 yd (46 m)	$2,000
EF0	A trampoline was lifted and deposited atop a power pole, a fence was damaged, and a few trees were downed.							
EF0	Eastern Westminster	Carroll	MD	39.5680°N 76.9880°W	1137 – 1138	0.66 mi (1.06 km)	50 yd (46 m)	$5,000
EF0	Several trees and tree branches were downed on the eastern side of Westminster.							
EF1	NE of St. Matthews	Calhoun	SC	33.7186°N 80.7152°W	1137 – 1145	4.68 mi (7.53 km)	440 yd (400 m)	$262,000
EF1	A tornado near Fort Motte damaged a farm, overturned a large section of a field irrigation system, and downed numerous trees and power lines.							
EF1	S of Sumter	Sumter	SC	33.8500°N 80.4300°W	1150 – 1204	10.75 mi (17.30 km)	220 yd (200 m)	$48,000
EF1	An intermittent tornado touched down northwest of Privateer and moved south of Sumter, causing minor roof and structural damage to several homes and downing numerous trees.							
EF0	E of Hampstead	Baltimore	MD	39.6090°N 76.8300°W	1209 – 1211	1.12 mi (1.80 km)	50 yd (46 m)	$5,000
EF0	Several trees were uprooted, and several tree branches were broken.							
EF0	SW of Shiloh	Sumter	SC	33.9121°N 80.0629°W	1218 – 1220	1.65 mi (2.66 km)	80 yd (73 m)	$18,000
EF0	A weak tornado northwest of Turbeville downed a few trees.							
EF0	WNW of Hereford	Baltimore	MD	39.5980°N 76.7050°W	1354 – 1355	0.1 mi (160 m)	75 yd (69 m)	$1,000
EF0	A brief tornado downed two dozen trees in a heavily wooded area.							
EF1	SSE of Beaverdam	Hanover	VA	37.8661°N 77.6292°W	1415 – 1420	2.54 mi (4.09 km)	150 yd (140 m)	$25,000
EF1	Numerous trees were downed, one of which fell on a house and caused minor roof damage.							
EF1	Breton Bay to E of Leonardtown	St. Mary's	MD	38.2630°N 76.6660°W	1525 – 1529	3.37 mi (5.42 km)	150 yd (140 m)	$35,000
EF1	A cinder-block wall was blown out of a storage shed, a few homes sustained roof and siding damage, and numerous trees were downed.							
EF0	S of Lusby	Calvert	MD	38.3660°N 76.4650°W	1541 – 1543	1.71 mi (2.75 km)	50 yd (46 m)	$7,000
EF0	About a dozen trees were uprooted, and several branches were broken.							
EF1	W of Rose Hill	Duplin	NC	34.8280°N 78.1460°W	1900 – 1905	1.37 mi (2.20 km)	100 yd (91 m)	$10,000
EF1	A portion of a hog farm was destroyed, with debris scattered for several hundred yards, and numerous trees were downed.							
EF0	WNW of Riegelwood	Columbus, Bladen	NC	34.3734°N 78.4207°W	1943 – 1946	0.57 mi (0.92 km)	20 yd (18 m)	$27,000
EF0	A brief tornado north of Bolton ripped the roof off an upholstery shop, damaged a shed, and downed a dozen trees.							
EF1	SW of Atkinson	Pender	NC	34.5097°N 78.1949°W	2007 – 2009	0.31 mi (500 m)	60 yd (55 m)	$66,000
EF1	Two grain silos and a barn were heavily damaged and blown across a road, and a few dozen trees were either snapped and uprooted as well.							
EF0	S of Atkinson to WNW of Burgaw	Pender	NC	34.5128°N 78.1850°W	2010 – 2019	6.29 mi (10.12 km)	50 yd (46 m)	$33,000
EF0	Three homes sustained minor damage, and many trees were downed.							
EF0	W of Vanceboro	Craven	NC	35.2993°N 77.3222°W	2020 – 2022	0.06 mi (97 m)	50 yd (46 m)	$0
EF0	Several trees were downed by a very brief tornado.							
EF0	NNE of Glynco	Glynn	GA	31.3100°N 81.4800°W	2022	0.01 mi (16 m)	10 yd (9.1 m)	$0
EF0	This very brief tornado touched down near I-95 and caused no damage.							
EF1	WSW of Watha	Pender	NC	34.6007°N 78.0641°W	2029 – 2034	3.08 mi (4.96 km)	60 yd (55 m)	$105,000
EF1	Several homes sustained minor roof, soffit, and siding damage, a large storage building sustained substantial damage, and the top of a grain silo was ripped off. Numerous large trees were downed, with a few falling on homes and causing damage.							
EF0	E of Jamesville	Martin	NC	35.8140°N 76.8320°W	2030 – 2031	0.07 mi (110 m)	30 yd (27 m)	$0
EF0	A brief tornado touched down in an open field, causing no damage.							
EF0	SW of Willard	Pender	NC	34.6752°N 77.9986°W	2038 – 2039	0.24 mi (390 m)	30 yd (27 m)	$12,000
EF0	This brief tornado struck a turkey farm, causing significant damage to a turkey house and killing a number of turkeys.							
EF0	N of Pantego	Beaufort	NC	35.6790°N 76.6340°W	2123 – 2127	0.31 mi (0.50 km)	30 yd (27 m)	$0
EF0	Trees were downed sporadically, with one large hardwood tree being snapped at the base.							

== See also ==
- Tornadoes of 2011
- 2011 Super Outbreak
- List of United States tornadoes in April 2011
- List of tornadoes in the tornado outbreak of April 14–16, 2011
- List of tornadoes in the 1974 Super Outbreak
- List of F5 and EF5 tornadoes
- List of tornadoes and tornado outbreaks
