= Poplar Creek, Mississippi =

- Unincorporated community
- Location within Mississippi Location within the United States
- Coordinates: 33°21′07″N 89°33′20″W
- Country: United States
- State: Mississippi
- County: Montgomery
- Elevation: 400 ft (120 m)
- Time zone: UTC-6 (Central (CST))
  - Summer (DST): UTC-5 (CDT)
- GNIS feature ID: 676219

Poplar Creek (also recorded as Polar Creek) is an unincorporated community in Montgomery County, Mississippi.

== History ==
In 1906, Poplar Creek had a population of 75. By 1960, Poplar Creek had a population of 350. A post office operated under the name Poplar Creek from 1848 to 1958.

Poplar Creek is served by the Poplar Creek Volunteer Fire Department.

The Poplar Creek Lookout Tower is listed on the National Historic Lookout Register.

On April 27, 2011, a tornado hit the Poplar Creek area as part of the 2011 Super Outbreak, causing heavy tree and power line damage. The tornado was classified rated EF2, with estimated wind speeds of 125 mph (201 km/h; 109 kn). The path of destruction was 1 mile (1.6 km) wide and the tornado travelled a path of 11.5 miles (18.5 km).

== Notable person ==
- Tobe Liston, the father of Sonny Liston, was born in Poplar Creek.
