= Guntersville Municipal Airport =

Guntersville Municipal Airport Joe Starnes Field
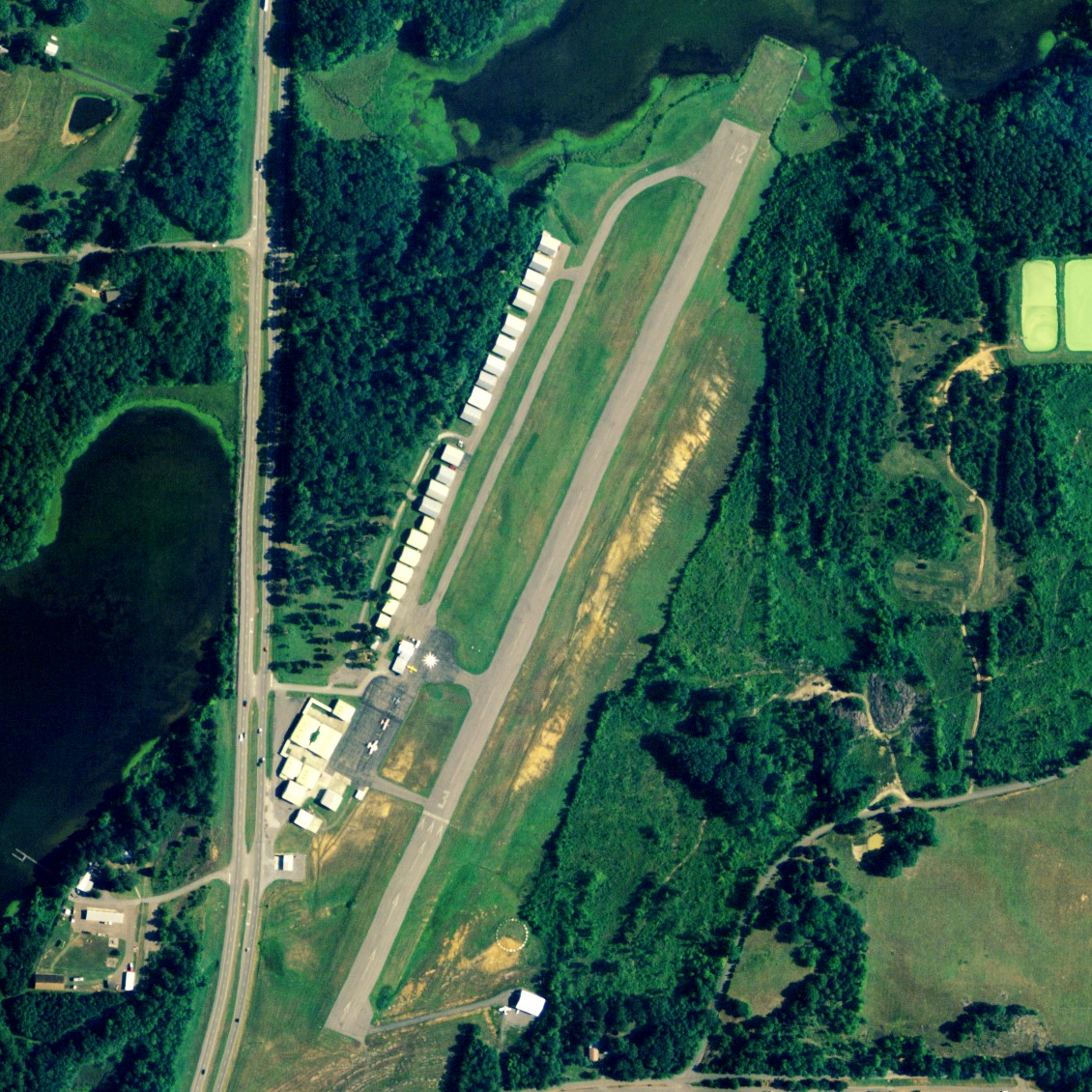
- NAIP aerial image, 2006
- IATA: none; ICAO: none; FAA LID: 8A1

Summary
- Airport type: Public
- Owner: City of Guntersville
- Serves: Guntersville, Alabama
- Elevation AMSL: 615 ft (187 m)
- Coordinates: 34°23′58″N 086°16′13″W

Map
- Location of airport in Alabama 8A1 (the United States)

Runways
Direction	Length		Surface
Direction	ft	m	Surface
07/25	5,005	1,263	Asphalt

Statistics (2016)
- Aircraft operations: 9,217
- Based aircraft: 39
- Source: Federal Aviation Administration

Guntersville Municipal Airport (FAA LID: 8A1), also known as Joe Starnes Field, is a city-owned public-use airport located three nautical miles (6 km) northeast of the central business district of Guntersville, a city in Marshall County, Alabama, United States. According to the FAA's National Plan of Integrated Airport Systems for 2009–2013, it is categorized as a general aviation facility.

== Facilities and aircraft ==
Airport covers an area of 55 acres (22 ha) at an elevation of 615 feet (187 m) above mean sea level. It has one runway designated 07/25 with an asphalt surface measuring 5,005 by 75 feet (1,525 x 23 m).

For the 12-month period ending July 13, 2009, the airport had 9,217 aircraft operations, an average of 25 per day: 99% general aviation and 1% military. At that time there were 39 aircraft based at this airport: 90% single-engine, 5% multi-engine and 5% helicopter.

== See also ==
- List of airports in Alabama
