= Warrenton, Alabama =

Unincorporated community in Alabama, US

- Unincorporated community
- Location within Alabama Location within the United States
- Coordinates: 34°21′24″N 86°21′34″W
- Country: United States
- State: Alabama
- County: Marshall
- Elevation: 620 ft (190 m)
- Time zone: UTC-6 (Central (CST))
  - Summer (DST): UTC-5 (CDT)
- Area codes: 256 & 938
- GNIS feature ID: 128591

Warrenton is an unincorporated community in Marshall County, Alabama, United States.

== Demographics ==
Historical population
Census	Pop.	Note	%±
1870	60		—
U.S. Decennial Census

Warrenton appeared on the 1870 U.S. Census as having a population of 60 residents. This was the only time it appeared on census rolls.

== History ==
Warrenton was named for Warren County, Virginia by the Smiths, an early family that settled in the area. Warrenton served as the county seat of Marshall County from 1841 to 1848. A post office operated under the name Warrenton from 1836 to 1906. Warrenton was the hometown of Thomas Atkins Street, a major in the 49th Alabama Infantry Regiment, and Oliver Day Street, who served as U.S. District Attorney for the Northern District of Alabama from 1907 to 1914 and served as special assistant to the Attorney General of the United States.
