= Tornado outbreak and floods of April 2–7, 2025 =

United States tornado outbreak and flash flood event

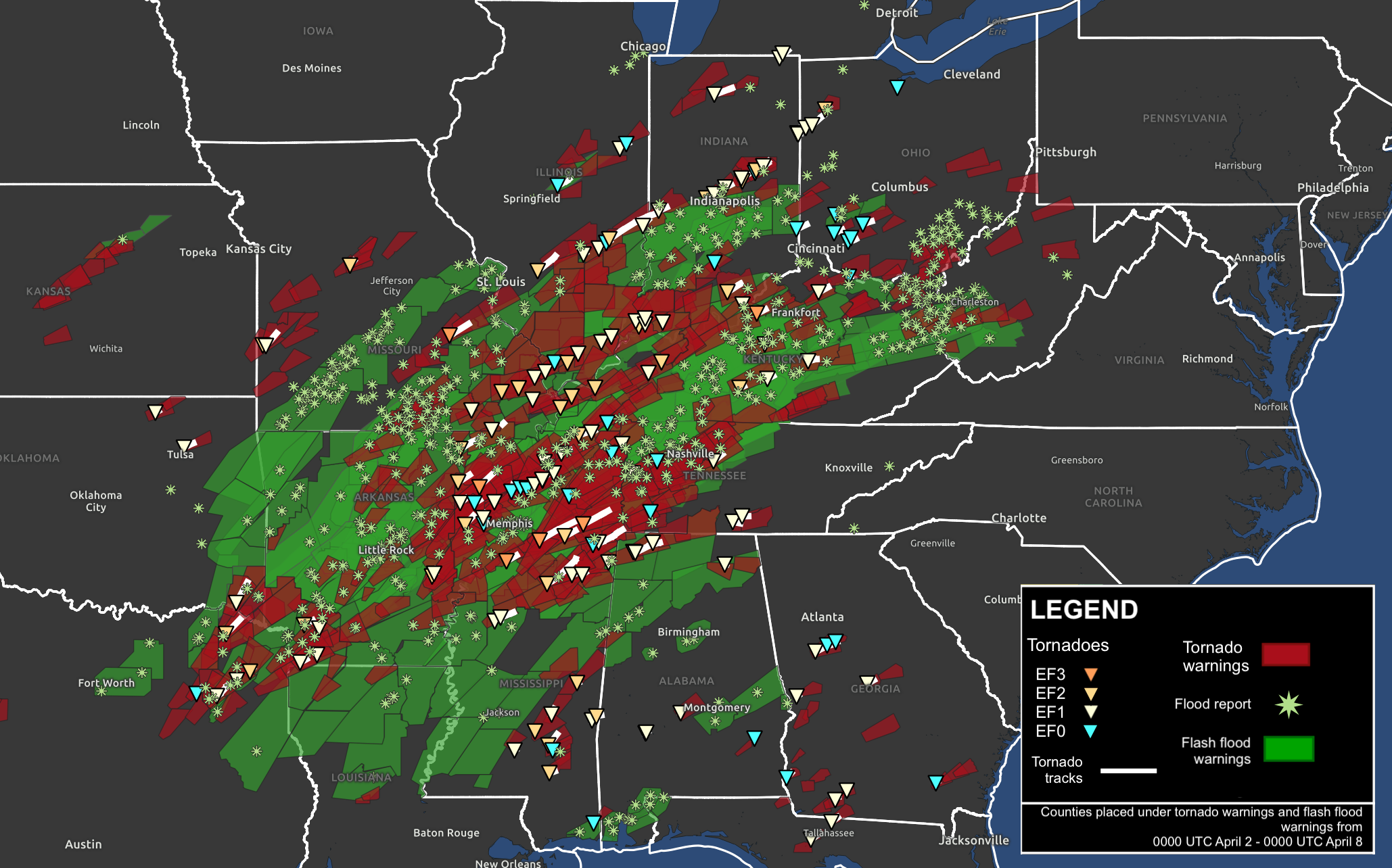
- Map of tornado warnings, confirmed tornadoes, flood reports and flash flood warnings from the outbreak and floods (from April 2–7)

Meteorological history
- Duration: April 2–7, 2025

Tornado outbreak
- Tornadoes: 157
- Max. rating: EF3 tornado
- Duration: 5 days, 6 hours, 10 minutes
- Highest winds: Tornadic – 165 mph (266 km/h) (Ebo, Missouri EF3 on April 2, Senatobia, Mississippi EF3 on April 3)
- Highest gusts: Non-tornadic – 110 mph (180 km/h) northwest of Magnolia, Arkansas on April 2
- Largest hail: 2.75 inches (7.0 cm) in multiple locations on April 2

Extratropical cyclone
- Lowest pressure: 986 hPa (mbar); 29.12 inHg
- Max. rainfall: 15.59 in (396 mm) in Benton, Kentucky
- Max. snowfall: Snow – 12 inches (30 cm) in La Moure, North Dakota; Ice – 0.22 in (5.6 mm) in Frenchville, Maine

Overall effects
- Fatalities: 24 total (8 tornadic (+1 indirect), 15 non-tornadic)
- Injuries: 47+
- Damage: $4.1 billion (2025 USD)
- Areas affected: Southern and Midwestern United States
- Power outages: >318,000
- Part of the tornado outbreaks of 2025, the 2024–25 North American winter and Floods in the United States in 2025

From April 2–7, 2025, a slow-moving weather system and a stationary front caused both a widespread and devastating tornado outbreak and historic, life-threatening flash flooding across much of the Southern and Midwestern United States.

The Storm Prediction Center (SPC) began monitoring the Mississippi Valley and surrounding regions on March 28 for the potential of future severe weather, eventually issuing a rare high risk for April 2, just weeks after a historic tornado outbreak in the same general area. Later that day, a tornado struck Owasso, Oklahoma, causing damage to homes. An EF1 tornado struck Nevada, Missouri, removing roofs from homes and injuring at least one person. An EF2 tornado struck Pilot Grove, Missouri, destroying a manufactured home and tossing cars. The tornado sirens in the town did not sound due to a malfunction, though no one was hurt. A large, multiple-vortex EF3 tornado moved through the city of Lake City in Arkansas, prompting a tornado emergency issuance. An indirect fatality occurred after an EF2 tornado struck Advance and Delta in Missouri, leaving significant damage to homes. In the early morning hours of April 3, an EF3 tornado struck Selmer, Tennessee, killing three people within the city and two others in surrounding McNairy County. Another supercell produced another EF3 tornado near Slayden, Mississippi, prompting the issuance of another tornado emergency. Near La Grange, Tennessee, two fatalities occurred when a tornado destroyed a mobile home.

The slow progression of the weather system also resulted in days of heavy rainfall and caused catastrophic flash flooding across much of the Ohio Valley. A broad swath of 8–12 inches (20–30 cm) of rain fell across the same areas, especially in the state of Kentucky. Multiple major rivers overflowed their banks, causing widespread damage in neighboring towns, with some nearing record crest levels. Due to multiple rounds of severe weather hitting the same areas, storm surveys had to be delayed for several days. In total, 24 people died as a result of the system; eight from tornadoes, along with one indirect death, and 15 from non-tornadic activity, including the flooding. Furthermore, at least 47 have been injured. With a total of 157 confirmed tornadoes, the outbreak received a score of 96 on the Outbreak Intensity Score (OIS), classifying it as a "devastating" outbreak. The tornado outbreak and flooding caused a total of $4.1 billion in damage.

== Meteorological synopsis ==
=== April 2–3 ===
The Convective Outlook issued for 1630Z by the Storm Prediction Center, showing a large high risk on the Mississippi River basin, including Memphis, Tennessee.

==== Forecast ====
Starting on March 28, 2025, the Storm Prediction Center began monitoring the risk of a severe weather event on April 2. Following a lack of expected severe potential the previous day, strong moisture return and the development of an upper-level system was discussed, with a 15% risk for severe weather being outlined over much of the middle Mississippi and Ohio Valleys. The next day, as forecast models came into greater agreement about the mode and timing of the system, a 30% risk was introduced over parts of Arkansas, Missouri, Mississippi, Tennessee, Illinois, Indiana, and Ohio, with forecasters describing that confidence existed for "a widespread, potentially substantial severe event". On March 30, the forecast was expanded to include parts of Texas, Louisiana, and Michigan in the risk area, as forecasted shear supported a primarily supercell-focused storm mode.

Three days out from the event, on the morning of March 31, an enhanced (3/5) risk was outlined over an area overlapping the previous 30% zone, now also including small parts of Oklahoma, Iowa, and Alabama, while now covering the majority of Kentucky, Illinois, Arkansas, and Indiana. The system, now described as a negatively-tilted trough, was expected to produce a widespread outbreak of severe weather over the region. A large warm sector over the Great Lakes region, a powerful jet streak of 100 kn (120 mph; 190 km/h), and an intense cold front, were all expected to contribute to the event, with the forecast outlining the risk for significant tornadoes, strong wind, and large hail. A higher risk category for the forecast was discussed over the middle Mississippi Valley, fueled by the threat of "multiple long-lived significant supercells", but was ultimately decided against due to a lack of confidence in how the storm system developed throughout the day.

An outlook on April 1 introduced a moderate (4/5) risk over small parts of Mississippi, Arkansas, Tennessee, Missouri, Kentucky, Illinois, and Indiana, driven by the threat of "significant to intense tornadoes", as outlined in updated model guidance. Due to significantly less uncertainty regarding the development of the storms, the Storm Prediction Center issued a high risk (5/5) convective outlook over southern Illinois, eastern Missouri, western Kentucky and Tennessee, eastern Arkansas, and extreme northwest Mississippi for "multiple EF3+ tornadoes".

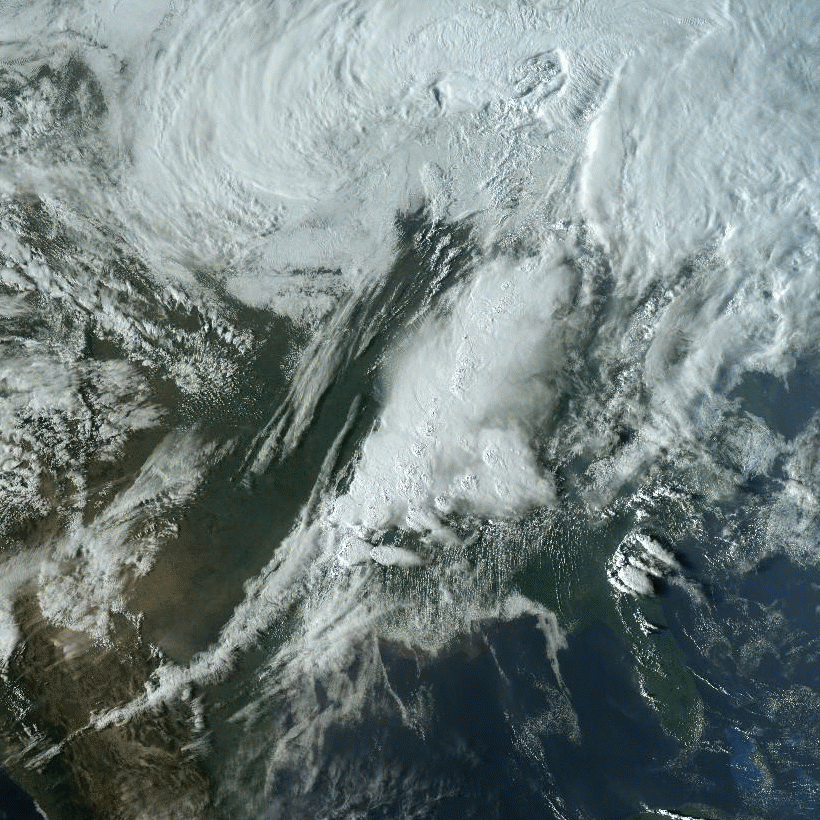
Satellite image of the cyclone responsible for the outbreak on April 2

A mid-level trough was positioned over the central United States and will move northeastward, while at the surface, a strong surface cyclone will move through the upper Mississippi Valley, accompanied by a jet streak ejection of 120 knots (140 mph; 220 km/h), while a cold front moves through much of the region. A moist airmass was moving into the Ozarks and middle Mississippi Valley region, which was expected to rapidly destabilize throughout the day while convection along the cold front continued. MLCAPE, a measure of atmospheric instability, was forecast to reach 2,500–3,500 J/kg in the middle Mississippi Valley, while a rapid ejection of the mid-level jet will bring strong ascent into the warm sector, conducive for intense storm development. The initiation of discrete storms was initially expected to occur east of the cold front inside of an unstable airmass, a region expected to – around 4 to 7 p.m. CDT – harbor around 400 m^{2}/s^{2} of storm-relative helicity in the first 3 kilometers of the atmosphere, alongside deep-layer shear of 60 knots. These conditions will be conducive to the development of discrete tornadic supercells, the strongest of which were expected to be capable of producing intense (EF3–EF5) tornadoes. Multiple intense tornadoes were forecasted throughout the evening. More supercells, potentially producing tornadoes, were outlined as a risk in the southern Ozarks and lower Ohio River valley.

More supercells, focused on the threat of strong winds exceeding 70 mph (110 km/h) and large hail exceeding 2 in (5.1 cm) were expected to develop in the region extending from Texas through the Great Lakes region, which were expected to develop bowing line segments producing further severe wind gusts as storms develop. Atmospheric recovery across the Red River valley in Texas had the possibility to support further supercells producing large hail after the main event concluded in the region.

==== Development of storms ====
Linear convection from the previous day persisted after midnight, with embedded supercells within the line posing a threat for tornadic activity due to the strongly sheared and destabilizing atmosphere over parts of Kansas and Missouri. At 2 a.m., a surface-based cold front was still present, positioned from central Kansas towards Texas' southern plains, moving southeast. As moisture entered central Oklahoma, fueled by a strong southwesterly jet and steep mid-level lapse rates, the capped environment eroded, which created an environment conducive towards surface convection, including supercells capable of producing large hail and tornadoes. Later on, at 4:30 a.m., as the line had migrated further east ahead of the cold front, forecasters noted that the potential for embedded supercells capable of wind, hail, and tornadoes, was increasing over much of Missouri and bordering regions of Kansas, Arkansas, and Oklahoma. Shortly before 7 a.m., storms had been moving across Oklahoma, with a storm in the northeastern part of the state attaining a supercellular structure, producing a brief tornado debris signature in the vicinity of Tulsa and Rogers counties. The line of storms moved parallel to the cold front into a region with an atmospheric capping inversion, which reduced the threat of further organization. Over central Missouri, a "somewhat messy storm mode" near the cold front moved towards an area marked by a relatively stable and capped atmosphere, which reduced the risk of severe hazards by 7:17 a.m.

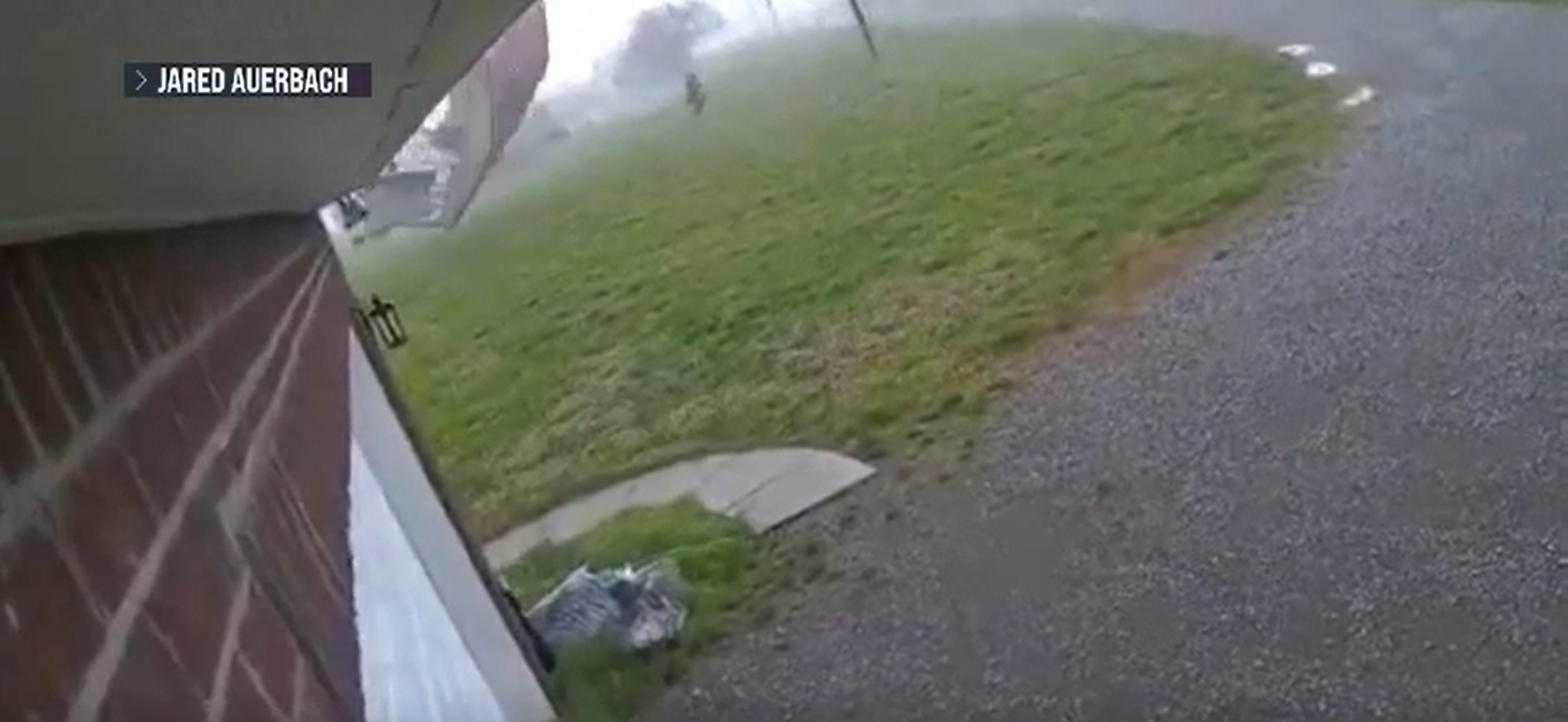
A CCTV still of a structure being raised into the air by a tornado shortly before hitting a house outside of Lebanon, Tennessee

Elevated storms had developed over parts of Ohio and Illinois, which produced a minor threat for hail and damaging winds throughout the later morning hours Further south, in northeastern Texas and surrounding areas, storms had begun forming on a pre-frontal confluence in an area with a minor capping inversion and moderate instability levels around 2500 J/kg. As these storms developed, the hazard of hail and strong tornadoes was noted by forecasters, despite the uncertainty of timing and ability to overcome the cap.

=== April 4 ===
==== Forecast ====
The day prior to the outbreak, the Storm Prediction Center outlined an Enhanced (3/5) risk over much of Arkansas and bordering regions of Oklahoma, Texas, and Missouri, as a surface cyclone was forecasted to develop over northeastern Texas or southeastern Oklahoma, which moved to the northeast, moving a warm sector into much of Arkansas and into far southern Missouri. Diurnal heating, alongside a growingly unstable atmosphere, strong shear, and forecasted storm-relative helicity values of 400 m^{2}/s^{2} over the region, were forecasted to support supercells, potentially producing strong tornadoes. Elevated convection along a cold front moving over Texas was also forecasted to pose a threat for large hail. A second outlook that day outlined a Moderate (4/5) risk over much of the same regions, with forecasters now outlining MLCAPE instability values between 2500 and 3500 J/kg over a frontal zone, which was expected to develop strong supercells capable of potentially strong tornadoes as the evening progressed. A conditional threat for strong, long-tracked tornadoes was also outlined ahead of the frontal zone. Despite weak forcing ahead of the frontal zone, strong MUCAPE instability values of 3000 to 4000 J/kg were forecasted to be conducive to the threat of discrete supercell development and the hazard of intense to violent tornadoes.

== Confirmed tornadoes ==
Confirmed tornadoes by Enhanced Fujita rating
EFU	EF0	EF1	EF2	EF3	EF4	EF5	Total
1	35	82	33	6	0	0	157

=== Bay–Lake City–Monette, Arkansas ===
Bay–Lake City–Monette, Arkansas
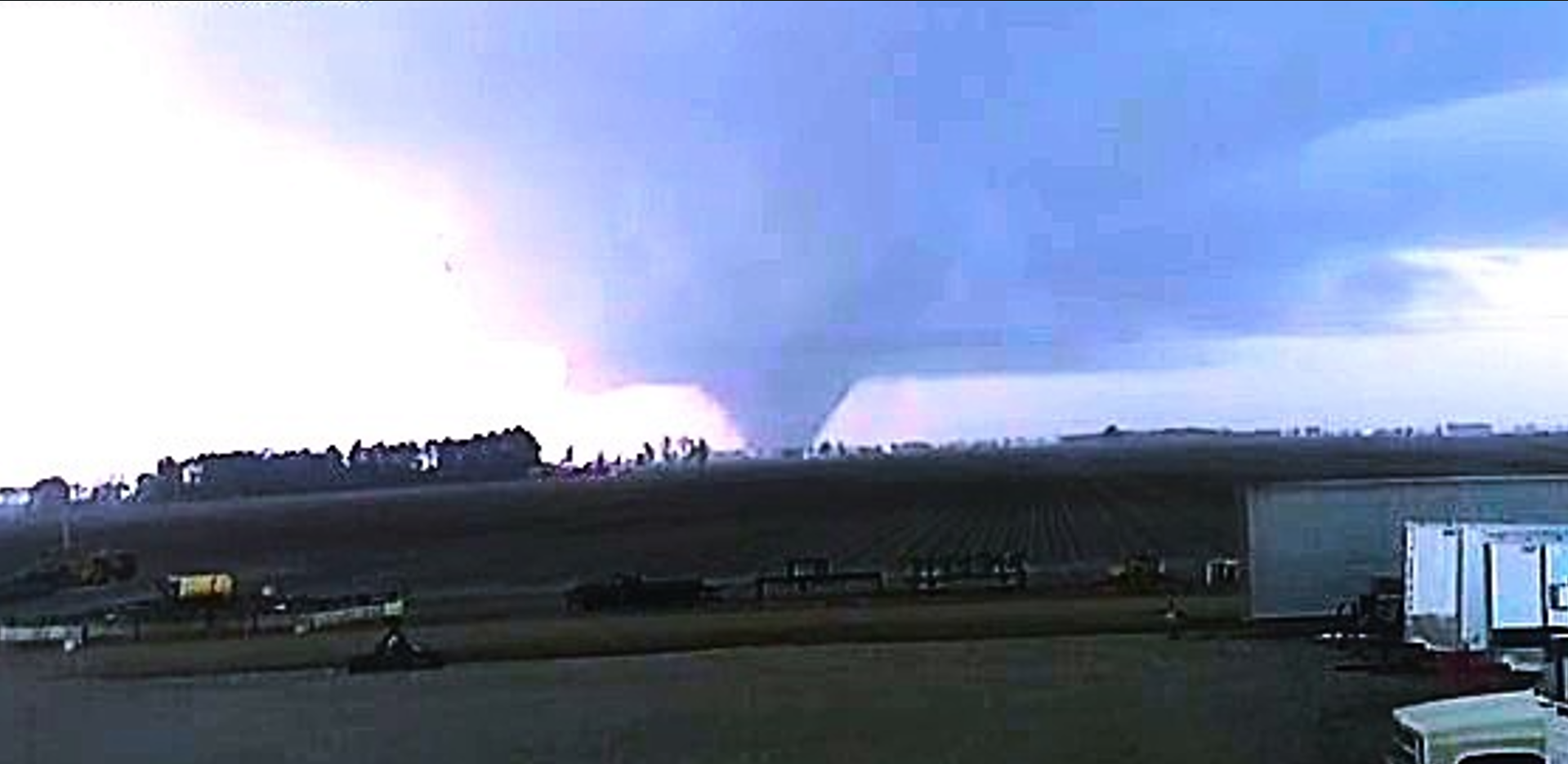
- The tornado near Bay, as seen from a security camera

Meteorological history
- Formed: April 2, 2025, 6:26 p.m. CDT (UTC–05:00)
- Dissipated: April 2, 2025, 6:55 p.m. CDT (UTC–05:00)
- Duration: 29 minutes

EF3 tornado
- on the Enhanced Fujita scale
- Highest winds: 160 mph (260 km/h)

Overall effects
- Fatalities: 0
- Injuries: 8

This large and destructive multi-vortex EF3 tornado developed west of Trumann at 6:26 p.m. CDT. It tracked northeastward across AR 69, causing minor damage to an outbuilding and damaging trees at EF0-EF1 intensity. After crossing I-555, the tornado intensified and fluctuated between EF1 and low-end EF2 strength as it passed southeast of Bay. Power poles were snapped along AR 463 and two freight trains on the BNSF Thayer South Subdivision were derailed. After snapping additional power poles and trees and destroying outbuildings along AR 158, the growing tornado strengthened further as it continued northeastward away from Bay, collapsing or heavily damaging several high-tension power line trusses at EF3 intensity. Shortly after that, at 6:40 p.m. CDT, the National Weather Service in Memphis, Tennessee issued a tornado emergency for Lake City and points northeast. The still-growing tornado then snapped trees and caused major roof and exterior wall damage to homes at EF2 intensity before crossing AR 158 and striking the west side of Lake City at the US 78/AR 158/AR 18/AR 135 intersection at high-end EF3 intensity. Multiple homes had all of their exterior walls and almost all of their interior walls knocked down, and trees were stubbed with some debarking noted, which was thought to be enhanced by flying debris. Northeast of Lake City, the tornado snapped more trees and additional power poles at EF2 strength. One small area of trees was stubbed with this damage being rated low-end EF3.

Moving northeastward away from Lake City, the tornado crossed the St. Francis River and began to move along the same path as the 2021 Tri-State tornado, causing sporadic EF2 damage to trees in agricultural fields as it began a slow narrowing trend. As it approached Monette, the tornado unroofed and knocked down the exterior walls of homes and snapped more power poles. After crossing US 78/AR 18 to the west of town, the shrinking tornado unroofed and knocked down the exterior walls of another home, heavily damaged a funeral home, and blew the windows of a church. After crossing US 78/AR 18 again, destroying an outbuilding and unroofing another home, the tornado reached EF3 intensity again as it crossed AR 139. Another home had multiple exterior and interior walls knocked down, and a metal building system was leveled and swept away. It also destroyed six grain silos; two were left standing with severe damage while the other four were thrown across the street. The tornado weakened and continued to narrow after that, scattering tin from the destroyed grain bins through fields before dissipating in Delfore just before reaching the Mississippi County line at 6:55 p.m. CDT.

The tornado was on the ground for 29 minutes, traveled 24.79 mi (39.90 km) and had a peak width of 1,500 yd (1,400 m). It injured eight people.

=== Selmer–Purdy–Adamsville–Hookers Bend, Tennessee ===
Selmer–Purdy–Adamsville–Hookers Bend, Tennessee
- The tornado near Selmer as seen from the east

Meteorological history
- Formed: April 3, 2025, 12:34 a.m. CDT (UTC–05:00)
- Dissipated: April 3, 2025, 1:07 a.m. CDT (UTC–05:00)
- Duration: 33 minutes

EF3 tornado
- on the Enhanced Fujita scale
- Highest winds: 160 mph (260 km/h)

Overall effects
- Fatalities: 5
- Injuries: 14
- Damage: US$27.6 million

This destructive and deadly EF3 tornado first touched down along Locke Road west-southwest of Selmer at 12:34 a.m. CDT. Moving east-northeastward at EF1 intensity, the tornado mainly snapped or uprooted trees, although one home did suffer roof damage. As it approached Sulphur Spring Road, it intensified to low-end EF2 intensity, uprooting numerous trees. Further intensification to high-end EF2 strength occurred as the tornado crossed Sulphur Springs Road at the Dee Moore Road intersection. Multiple homes in this area were heavily damaged, with exterior walls knocked down, a manufactured home was obliterated, outbuildings were destroyed, and more trees were snapped or uprooted. Continuing east-northeastward at EF2 intensity, the tornado snapped or uprooted swaths of trees as it approached Selmer. It then destroyed another manufactured home, and unroofed and knocked down exterior walls of more homes as it approached and then crossed US 45/US 64 at the New Bethel Road intersection. The tornado then rapidly intensified to EF3 strength as it entered Selmer along New Bethel Road. Several homes suffered severe damage, including one home that was flattened, manufactured homes were obliterated and swept away, a group of apartment buildings sustained heavy exterior wall and roof damage, vehicles were flipped, and trees were shredded. The tornado then moved through the northwestern part of the city and across US 64 Bus. Many homes and businesses were heavily damaged or destroyed, more apartment buildings were damaged, and trees were snapped and uprooted. After briefly weakening to EF2 strength, the tornado reached its peak intensity of high-end EF3 along the Adams Extension on the north side of the city, where two homes were flattened, another one had most of its exterior walls knocked down, and a fourth was shifted off its foundation. Other homes nearby were also damaged, and trees were uprooted as well. The tornado then crossed the West Tennessee Railroad and exited Selmer.

The tornado then continued east-northeastward and crossed Bethesda Purdy Road at high-end EF2 strength. It destroyed a metal building system, caused severe roof and exterior wall damage to a home, heavily damaged an outbuilding, and uprooted and snapped trees. The tornado then moved through mainly forested areas, snapping and uprooting large swaths of trees at EF1-EF2 strength. It also damaged homes and outbuildings along more rural roads near Purdy as well as along SR 224 near Adamsville and destroyed a concrete power pole. This was the second time in three years that a strong tornado had moved through this area; another deadly EF3 tornado had struck this region on March 31, 2023. North of Adamsville, a metal building system along SR 22 was heavily damaged at EF1 intensity; another home nearby was also damaged. Mainly tree damage occurred afterward as the tornado crossed into Hardin County and crossed SR 69. It briefly reached EF2 strength again as it crossed Coffee Landing Road, snapping and uprooting trees. The tornado continued to snap or uproot trees as well as damage or destroy outbuildings at EF1 intensity before dissipating west of Hookers Bend at 1:07 a.m. CDT.

The tornado traveled 29.33 mi (47.20 km) in 33 minutes and reached a peak width of 650 yd (590 m). It killed five people and injured 14 others. The tornado caused $27.6 million in damage in McNairy County alone.

=== Slayden, Mississippi/Grand Junction, Tennessee ===
Slayden, Mississippi/Grand Junction, Tennessee
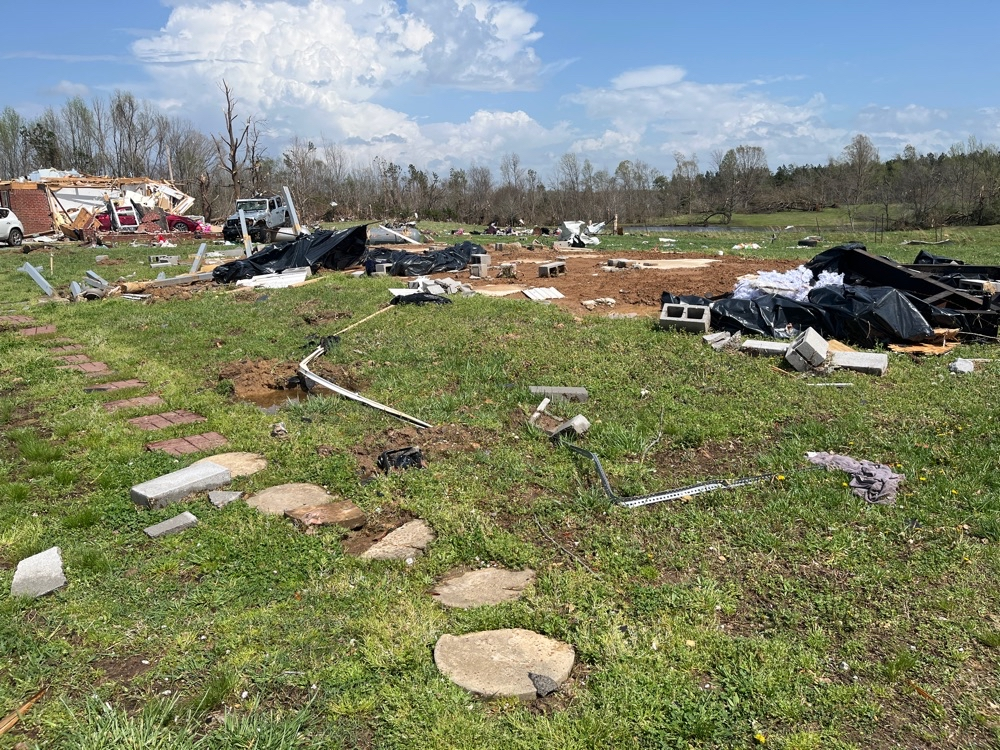
- Mid-range EF3 damage to a swept away mobile home southeast of Slayden, Mississippi

Meteorological history
- Formed: April 3, 2025, 1:13 a.m. CDT (UTC–05:00)
- Dissipated: April 3, 2025, 2:02 a.m. CDT (UTC–05:00)
- Duration: 49 minutes

EF3 tornado
- on the Enhanced Fujita scale
- Highest winds: 160 mph (260 km/h)

Overall effects
- Fatalities: 2
- Injuries: 3

This large, long-tracked, and destructive tornado struck the towns of Slayden, Mississippi and Grand Junction, Tennessee early on April 3, prompting the issuance of the second tornado emergency of the outbreak. It first touched down in Marshall County east of Taska, Mississippi at 1:13 am CDT. Moving northeastward, the tornado began snapping and uprooting trees at EF1 intensity as it crossed MS 311. Growing in both size and strength, the tornado crossed Isom Chapel Road at low-end EF2 intensity, heavily damaging homes and snapping or uprooting more trees. Further intensification occurred, and the tornado reached high-end EF3 strength as it passed south of Slayden along Hurdle Club Road. A well-built home was mostly leveled, leaving a few interior walls standing, while a nearby mobile home was obliterated and swept away, with little debris left behind. Multiple other homes along Hogan Road and South Slayden Road suffered high-end EF2 to low-end EF3 damage with roofs removed and exterior walls knocked down, and swaths of trees were snapped or uprooted. After causing additional EF2 damage, which included snapping trees as it crossed over US 72 east of Slayden, the tornado once again reached EF3 intensity as it crossed Kennedy Road, collapsing a metal truss tower. EF2 damage occurred nearby with another home having multiple walls knocked down, and more swaths of trees were snapped. The tornado then weakened slightly to high-end EF2 strength. South of Early Grove along Early Grove Road, a home had its second story removed along with multiple exterior walls knocked down, and trees were snapped or uprooted. Further weakening to low-end EF2 intensity occurred as the tornado turned to an east-northeastward heading and continued to snap or uproot swath of trees southeast of Early Grove before crossing into Benton County at EF1 intensity, mainly damaging trees, although it also shoved a mobile home off its foundation. Just before crossing the state line, the tornado regained low-end EF2 intensity, knocking down multiple exterior walls of a home and causing heavy tree damage.

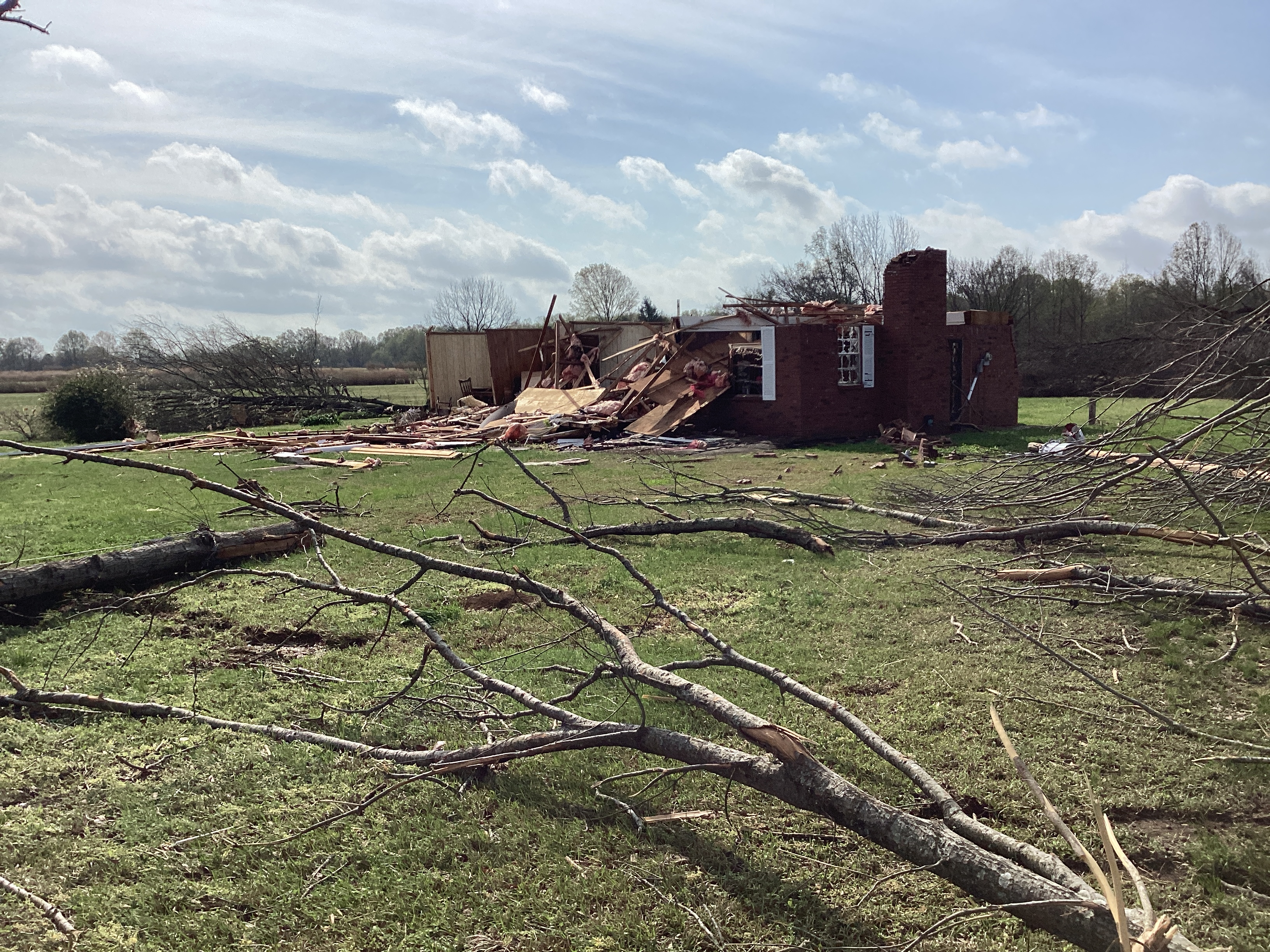
High-end EF2 damage to a home east of Early Grove, Mississippi

The tornado then moved into Fayette County, Tennessee at EF2 strength, killing two people and injuring three others when a mobile home was blown away outside of Moscow. Continuing east-northeastward, the tornado snapped and uprooted swaths of trees at EF1 strength with some isolated pockets of EF2 damage. After crossing SR 18, the tornado then struck Grand Junction at EF1 intensity and strengthened to EF2 intensity on the north side of town. It heavily damaged several homes, knocked over freight cars at the Mississippi Central Railroad/Norfolk Southern junction, and damaged more trees. The tornado then crossed SR 57 and departed Grand Junction, continuing to snap and uproot swaths of trees and weakening to EF1 intensity as it passed north of Saulsbury. After causing more sporadic tree damage between West Road and Sain Road, the tornado began to cause a more definite tree damage path. Along and near Lake Hardeman Road and Maxwell Road, the tornado damaged mobile homes and other homes, damaged poles, and damaged or destroyed outbuildings, and snapped and uprooted more trees. After crossing SR 125, the tornado turned more eastward and damaged several structures along Lake Vonda, including one structure that sustained EF2 damage. Other homes and trees suffered EF1 damage as the tornado continued eastward before it dissipated in Hebron.

The tornado traveled 39.93 mi (64.26 km) in 49 minutes and had a peak width of 1,200 yd (1,100 m). Two people were killed and three others were injured. Debris was reportedly lofted 20,000 feet (6,100 m) into the air.

== Non-tornadic effects ==
=== Flooding ===
The combination of a stationary front associated with the system and the slow progression eastward resulted in catastrophic and historic flash flooding in parts of Kentucky, Arkansas, Missouri, and Tennessee, with widespread rainfall totals of over 6 in (150 mm) being reported in many areas. In the state of Michigan, around 2–3 in (51–76 mm) of rain fell, breaking records. Fort Wayne, Indiana picked up over 1 in (25 mm) of rain, ending the second longest 1+" drought on record. Multiple flash flood emergencies were issued, including one in Memphis, Tennessee on April 5 during the afternoon, and the first ever issued for Little Rock, Arkansas in the morning due to persistent storms. On April 6, heavy rainfall and flash flooding occurred in Mobile, Alabama and the surrounding areas, resulting in a number of flash flood warnings. A record of 6.51 in (165 mm) of rain fell at the Mobile Regional Airport.

==== Kentucky ====
The state that saw the worst flooding impacts by far was Kentucky, with peak rainfall accumulations of over 15 in (380 mm) near the towns of Benton and Hickory. Two fatalities from flooding were confirmed in the state, a child in the city of Frankfort and a woman in Nelson County. Governor Andy Beshear said that approximately 540 roadways, mostly in the western regions of the state, were closed due to flooding. 1,100 people were said to be without water services.

Frankfort experienced record flooding, with the Kentucky River cresting at 48.27 feet (14.71 m) on the morning of April 7, 17 feet (5.2 m) above normal flood stage and just short of the record of 48.47 feet (14.77 m) set on December 10, 1978. Frankfort mayor Layne Wilkerson issued a curfew for the city until Monday, April 7. One resident described the river rising as much as "within 4 inches" in only 30 minutes.

The impacts from the floods resulted in the cancellation of the 2025 installment of Thunder Over Louisville.

=== Downbursts ===
An intense downburst brought winds of 110 mph (180 km/h) to areas near Lake Columbia in Columbia County, Arkansas on April 2. Hundreds of trees were downed, with one home suffering moderate damage due to a pine tree being uprooted and falling on it.

=== Winter storm ===
In La Moure, North Dakota, a CoCoRaHS observer reported a 48-hour snowfall total of 12 in (30 cm) between April 2 and 3. Around 3–5 in (7.6–12.7 cm) of snow fell in west central Minnesota.

== Impacts and aftermath ==
Municipal siren tests in Columbus, Ohio and Little Rock, Arkansas were canceled on April 2 due to expected severe weather. Ahead of the storm, Kentucky governor Andy Beshear issued a state of emergency ahead of the April 2 tornado outbreak and flooding in the state. He stated that no fatalities had been confirmed in the state.

=== Relief efforts ===
The American Red Cross began providing aid to people affected providing food and basic needs and other forms of support. On April 6, President Donald Trump approved emergency declarations for Arkansas, Kentucky, and Tennessee. Kentucky governor Andy Beshear issued a state of emergency on April 2. The American Red Cross deployed over 1,110 trained responders to help affected areas. The nonprofit Salvation Army provided emergency feeding and delivered supplies to many western Kentucky counties. The Realtors Relief Foundation provided financial assistance to people affected in Missouri.

=== NOAA-related issues ===
Following staff cuts to NOAA, the National Weather Service office in Louisville, Kentucky, announced they would not be conducting tornado damage surveys until early the next week after the outbreak. On April 4, Bloomberg and Axios reported that the website of the National Severe Storms Laboratory, which runs forecast models, and various other websites and systems used in the delivery of warnings, were set to be shut down at midnight on April 5 as a result of contract terminations at NOAA and a directive to NOAA to cut all IT-related spending by 50%. This was later pushed back to July 31, following a renewal of a contract with Amazon Web Services.

The National Weather Service Office in Memphis issued a Public Information Statement on April 4, announcing that due to the lack of bandwidth caused by high staff workloads, the issuance of severe weather statements for non-severe storms were suspended temporarily, ahead of that day's severe weather event. The posting of local storm reports was also put on hold due to a "tremendous backlog", with the decision being made to have reports be posted in bulk to avoid outdated information in a "chaotic operational environment".

=== Impact on agriculture ===
Flooding covered large areas of agricultural land which caused an estimated $78 million (2025 USD) of lost crops. Larger losses were avoided because the flooding happened before other crops like cotton and peanuts were planted and at a time when corn and soybeans could be replanted.

== See also ==
- Weather of 2025
- List of North American tornadoes and tornado outbreaks
- List of United States tornadoes in April 2025
- 2008 Super Tuesday tornado outbreak – Affected similar areas seventeen years prior
- Tornado outbreak of December 10–11, 2021 – Another significant tornado event that impacted similar areas
- Tornado outbreak of March 31 – April 1, 2023 – A major tornado outbreak that impacted the same areas two years earlier
- Tornado outbreak of May 15–16, 2025 – A tornado outbreak that impacted similar areas about six weeks later.
- List of F3, EF3, and IF3 tornadoes (2020–present)
