= Mississippi Highway 7 =

Highway in Mississippi

Mississippi Highway 7

Route information
- Maintained by MDOT
- Length: 168.1 mi (270.5 km) (139.482 mi excluding concurrencies)
- Existed: 1932–present

Major junctions
- South end: US 49W / MS 12 in Belzoni
- US 82 from Itta Bena to Greenwood; US 49E in Greenwood; I-55 in Grenada; US 51 from Grenada to Hardy; I-55 in Hardy; US 278 / MS 6 in Oxford I-22 / US 78 in Holly Springs; US 72 near Lamar
- North end: SR 18 at the Tennessee state line in Michigan City

Location
- Country: United States
- State: Mississippi
- Counties: Humphreys, Leflore, Carroll, Grenada, Yalobusha, Lafayette, Marshall, Benton

Highway system
- Mississippi State Highway System; Interstate; US; State
← MS 6	→ MS 8

Mississippi Highway 7 (MS 7) runs generally north–south from the Tennessee state line in Benton County to Belzoni, Mississippi. It travels approximately 168 miles (270 km), serving Humphreys, Leflore, Carroll, Grenada, Yalobusha, Lafayette, Marshall, and Benton counties while serving several points of interest, including Florewood River Plantation State Park, the University of Mississippi, and Wall Doxey State Park. MS 7 runs nearly parallel to the rarely used Mississippi Central Railroad.

== Route description ==
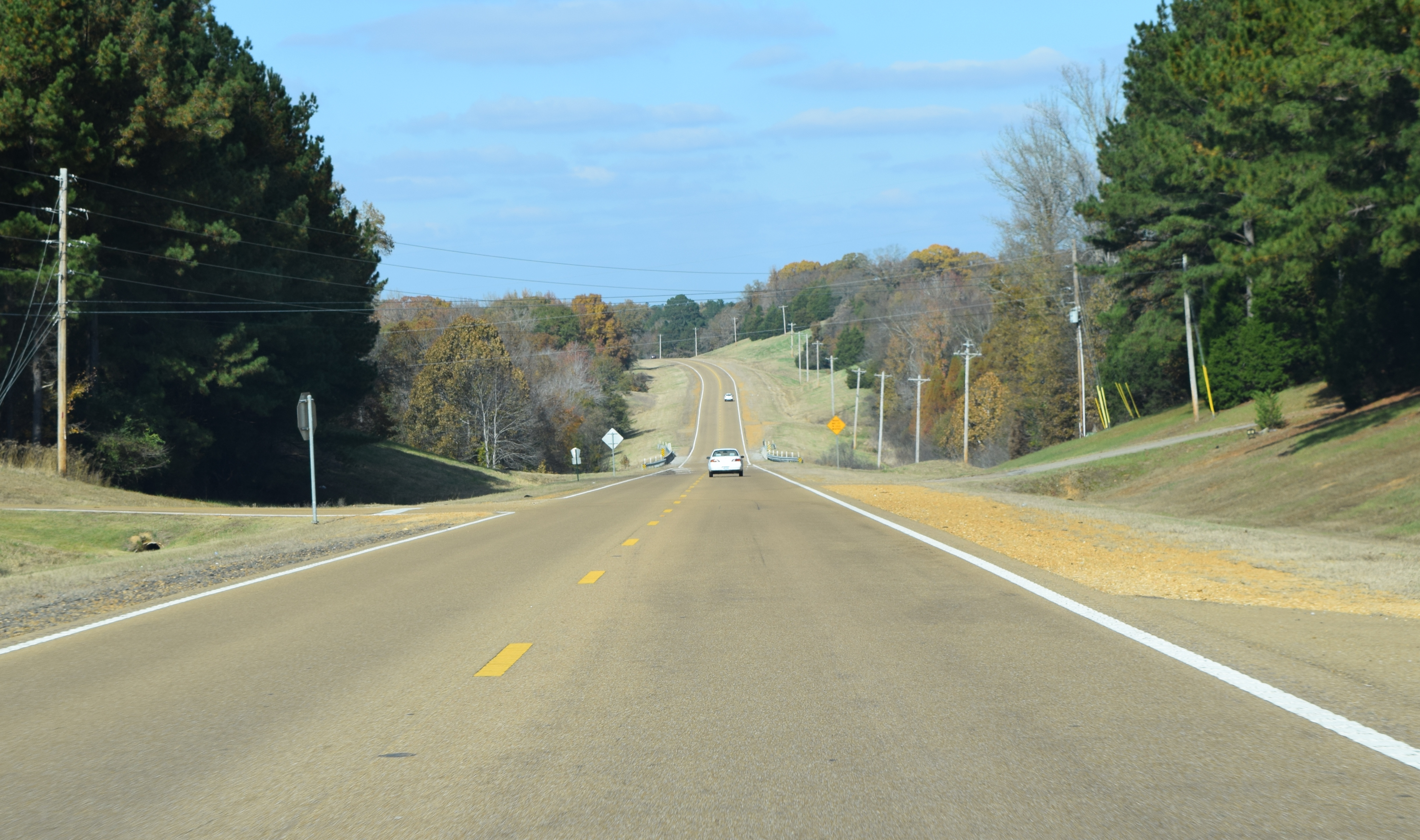
Highway 7 north of Oxford

MS 7 begins in the Mississippi Delta region in Humphreys County at an intersection between US 49W, MS 3, and MS 12 in Belzoni. It heads east as a two-lane highway along 1st Street into downtown, where it turns north along Hayden Street to pass through neighborhoods before leaving Belzoni. The highway curves to the north east as it passes through farmland, paralleling the Yazoo River as it passes through the Sky Lake Wildlife Management Area. Throughout this area, MS 7 crosses over several oxbow lakes and bayous, both of which represent former alignments of the Yazoo River. MS 7 now enters Leflore County.

MS 7 now travels through the community of Swiftown and the town of Morgan City, where it passes just a few miles west of Mathews Brake National Wildlife Refuge. The highway now passes through Quito before going straight through downtown Itta Bena, with it entering town and immediately making a right turn onto Lakeside Street, then left onto Basket Street, which turns into Schley Street in downtown. MS 7 now comes to an intersection with US 82, which it becomes concurrent with and they head east as four-lane divided highway to enter the Greenwood city limits, immediately passing along the northern edge of Florewood River Plantation State Park. US 49E joins the concurrency and they cross a floodway (which dumps water from the Tallahatchie River into the Yazoo) to enter a business district. US 49E/US 82/MS 7 turn southward to bypass downtown, and cross a bridge over the Yazoo River, before curving back eastward to come to a large interchange with Main Street (unsigned MS 743) at the south side of downtown, where US 49E splits off. US 82/MS 7 continue east to pass through neighborhoods, where it has a partial interchange with MS 744 and an intersection with MS 430, before MS 7 splits off as a two-lane at the eastern edge of town and heads north to leave Greenwood. MS 7 crosses over Big Sand Creek as it begins paralleling the Yalobusha River, passing through farmland to cross into the northwestern most corner of Carroll County, where it passes through Avalon, before entering Grenada County.

MS 7 passes through Malmaison State Wildlife Management Area and Leflore to enter Holcomb, where it bypasses town along its north side, has an extremely short concurrency with MS 35, and becomes concurrent with MS 8. MS 7/MS 8 head east to climb into the North Central Hills region and enter Grenada. The highway widens to a four-lane undivided boulevard as it passes through an industrial area for a few miles to an interchange with I-55 (Exit 206) just west of downtown, where MS 7 splits from MS 8 and heads north along I-55. I-55/MS 7 head north as a four-lane freeway to cross the Yalobusha River and have an interchange with Papermill Road (Exit 208). They now pass through the Geeslin Corner neighborhood to leave Grenada and come to Exit 211 (unsigned MS 729), where MS 7 splits off and heads northeast as a two-lane. The highway has an intersection with MS 333 Scenic before crossing into Yalobusha County.

MS 7 passes along the northern banks of Grenada Lake for several miles to enter the town of Coffeeville, which it bypasses along its western side while also having an intersection with MS 330. It heads through mostly wooded areas for several miles, where it passes through the community of Velma, to enter the town of Water Valley. It widens to a four-lane divided highway as it bypasses downtown along its western side and has intersections with MS 32 and MS 315. The highway now narrows back to two-lanes as it enters wooded areas and crosses into Lafayette County.

MS 7 heads northeast to pass through Springdale before turning north at a Y-Intersection with MS 9W and crossing over the Yocona River. It then has an intersection with MS 328 before entering the Oxford city limits and passes through neighborhoods for a few miles to an interchange with US 278/MS 6, which provides access to the main campus of the University of Mississippi (Ole Miss). The highway now widens to a four-lane divided freeway to bypass downtown along its eastern side and have interchanges with MS 314 (University Avenue), Sisk Avenue, and MS 30 (Molly Barr Road), where the freeway ends and MS 7 narrows back to two-lanes to leave Oxford. MS 7 heads north through wooded areas to pass through Abbeville, which it bypasses along its western side, before entering Marshall County at a bridge over the Tallahatchie River (which lies at the northern most reaches of Sardis Lake inside the Graham Wildlife Management Area).

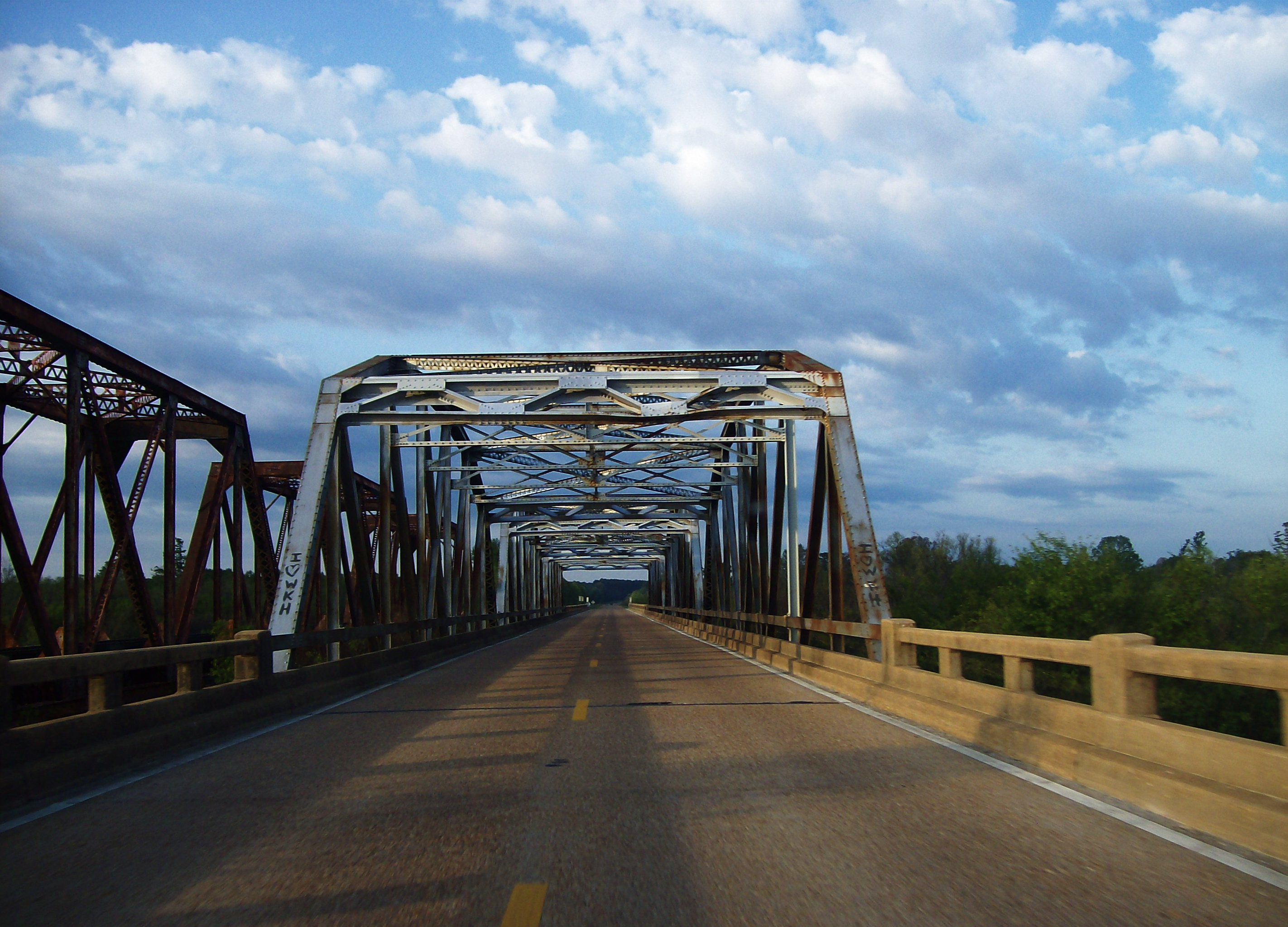
Highway 7 and rarely used Mississippi Central Railroad bridges over the Tallahatchie River at the Lafayette-Marshall county line. This sweeping bottomland, located approximately halfway between Holly Springs and Oxford, was the inspiration for fictional settings in several works by William Faulkner. This bridge was replaced and removed in 2015.

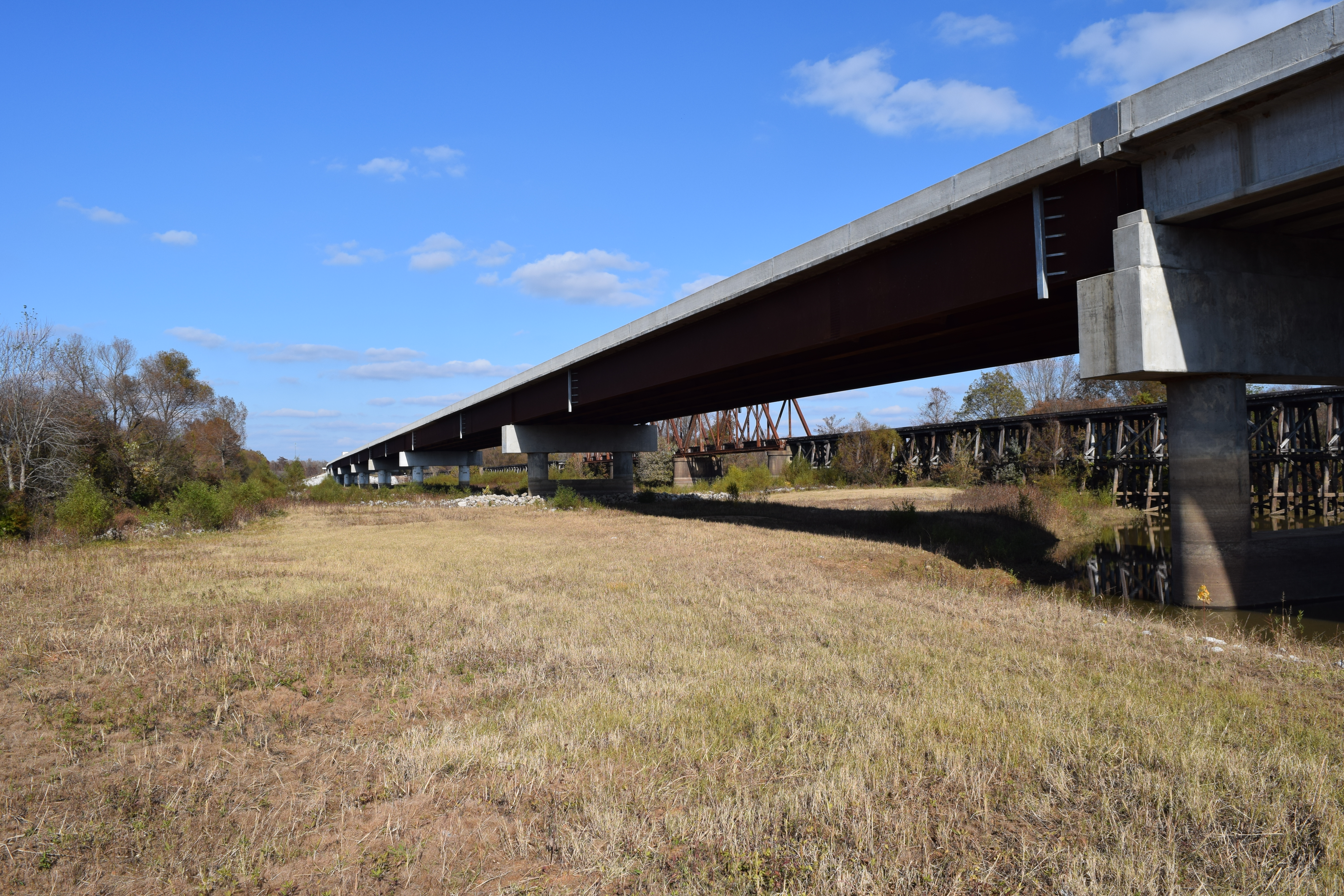
The new Tallahatchie River bridge that was built in 2015

MS 7 continues north through wooded areas for several miles as it has an intersection with MS 310 and passes through the town of Waterford. The highway now passes by Wall Doxey State Park before becoming concurrent with MS 4 and entering the Holly Springs city limits. MS 4/MS 7 enter town along S Craft Street and widen to a four-lane highway for a short distance to have an interchange with I-22/US 78 (Exit 30) and pass through a business district. The highway narrows to two-lanes and passes through neighborhoods for several blocks to make a right turn onto W Van Dorn Avenue and enter downtown. MS 4/MS 7 come to an intersection with Memphis Street, where MS 7 splits off and heads north along MS 178 (Memphis Street). They now leave downtown and pass by Rust College before MS 178 splits off along Old Highway 78. MS 7 now passes through an industrial area as it has intersections with MS 311 (Mount Pleasant Road) and Eddy Lee Smith Drive (a new Northern bypass of the city). The highway now leaves Holly Springs and pass through a mix of farmland and woodlands to pass almost exactly halfway between Atway and Hudsonville, where it has an intersection with MS 313, before crossing into Benton County.

MS 7 now enters farmland as it passes through the community of Lamar, where it has an intersection with unsigned MS 704, as it continues northeast to have an intersection with US 72. The highway now crosses a creek to have an intersection with Harris Chapel Road (proposed MS 5 extension) before passing through woodlands for a few miles to Michigan City, where it has an intersection with unsigned MS 702. MS 7 comes to the Tennessee state line shortly thereafter, where it continues into Grand Junction, Tennessee as Tennessee State Route 18 (SR 18).

== Future ==
MS 7 between Grenada to Holly Springs has been designated as High Priority Corridor 98. MDOT has been working on improving this route by widening it to four lanes since at least 2003. Most recently in April 2023, $15 million has been allocated to start the processing of widening MS 7 south of Oxford. The project as a whole is expected to cost $150 million with the bidding process starting next year.

== Major intersections ==
County	Location	mi	km	Destinations	Notes
Humphreys	Belzoni	0.0	0.0	US 49W (MS 3) / MS 12 – Hollandale, Yazoo City, Indianola	Southern terminus
Leflore		29.2	47.0	US 82 west – Indianola, Mississippi Valley State University	South end of US 82 overlap
Leflore	Greenwood	33.7	54.2	US 49E north – Clarksdale	South end of US 49E overlap
Leflore	Greenwood	38.0– 38.3	61.2– 61.6	US 49E south / Main Street (MS 743 north) – Tchula, Yazoo City, Greenwood Business District	Interchange; north end of US 49E overlap; southern terminus of unsigned MS 743
Leflore	Greenwood	39.3– 39.4	63.2– 63.4	MS 744 west	Eastern terminus of MS 744; no left turn northbound
Leflore	Greenwood	39.6	63.7	MS 430 east – Blackhawk	Western terminus of MS 430
Leflore	Greenwood	39.9	64.2	US 82 east – Winona	North end of US 82 overlap
Carroll	No major junctions				
Grenada	Holcomb	61.2	98.5	MS 8 west / MS 35 north – Minter City, Cleveland, Delta State University	South end of MS 8 / MS 35 overlap
Grenada	Holcomb	61.4	98.8	MS 35 south – Carrollton	North end of MS 35 overlap
Grenada	Grenada	69.2	111.4	I-55 south / MS 8 east – Grenada, Jackson, Grenada Lake	North end of MS 8 overlap; south end of I-55 overlap; MS 7 south follows exit 206
Grenada	Grenada	70.9– 71.5	114.1– 115.1	Papermill Road - North Grenada	I-55 exit 208
Grenada		74.4	119.7	I-55 north – Memphis To US 51 (MS 729 south)	North end of I-55 overlap; south end of MS 333 Scenic overlap; MS 7 north follows exit 211; northern terminus of unsigned MS 729
Grenada		78.7	126.7	MS 333 Scenic south (MS 333 south) – Grenada Dam	North end of MS 333 Scenic overlap; northern terminus of unsigned MS 333
Yalobusha	Coffeeville	87.0	140.0	MS 330 – Tillatoba, Coffeeville	
Yalobusha		97.9	157.6	MS 32 / MS 315 south – Oakland, Bruce, South Water Valley	South end of MS 315 overlap
Yalobusha	Water Valley	100.8	162.2	MS 315 north – Batesville, Water Valley	North end of MS 315 overlap
Lafayette		111.0	178.6	MS 9W south – Bruce	Northern terminus of MS 9W
Lafayette		112.0	180.2	MS 328 west – Taylor	Eastern terminus of MS 328
Lafayette	Oxford	117.1– 117.5	188.5– 189.1	US 278 / MS 6 – Batesville, Pontotoc, University of Mississippi	Interchange; south end of freeway
Lafayette	Oxford	117.7– 118.0	189.4– 189.9	MS 314 west (University Avenue / MS 334 east) – Downtown Oxford	Interchange; eastern terminus of MS 314; western terminus of MS 334
Lafayette	Oxford	118.5– 118.9	190.7– 191.4	Sisk Avenue	Interchange
Lafayette	Oxford	119.3– 119.7	192.0– 192.6	MS 30 east / Molly Barr Road – New Albany	Interchange; western terminus of MS 30; north end of freeway
Lafayette	Abbeville	127.7	205.5	CR 108 / CR 215 (West Long Street) – Abbeville, Sardis Reservoir	
Marshall		133.5	214.8	MS 310 west – Wyatt Crossing, Teckville, Sardis Reservoir	Eastern terminus of MS 310
Marshall		139.9	225.1	Wall Doxey State Park	Access road into park
Marshall		144.4	232.4	MS 4 west – Senatobia	South end of MS 4 overlap
Marshall	Holly Springs	145.8– 146.0	234.6– 235.0	I-22 / US 78 – Memphis, Tupelo	I-22/US 78 exit 30
Marshall	Holly Springs	147.4	237.2	MS 4 east / MS 178 east (Van Dorn Avenue) – Ashland	North end of MS 4 overlap; south end of MS 178 overlap
Marshall	Holly Springs	148.1	238.3	MS 178 west (Martin Luther King Jr. Drive) to US 78	North end of MS 178 overlap
Marshall	Holly Springs	148.9	239.6	MS 311 north – Mount Pleasant	Southern terminus of MS 311
Marshall	Holly Springs	149.4	240.4	To US 78 / Eddie Lee Smith Drive – Oxford, Ashland	Northern bypass of Holly Springs
Marshall		155.0	249.4	MS 313 south – Hudsonville	Northern terminus of MS 313
Benton		160.6	258.5	Lamar ( MS 704 east)	Western terminus of MS 704
Benton		163.1	262.5	US 72 – Memphis (Tennessee), Corinth	
Benton		165.7	266.7	Harris Chapel Road	Proposed MS 5 south
Benton		166.7	268.3	Michigan City ( MS 702 east)	Western terminus of MS 702
Benton		168.1	270.5	SR 18 north – Grand Junction	Northern terminus; Tennessee state line
1.000 mi = 1.609 km; 1.000 km = 0.621 mi: Concurrency terminus; Incomplete access
