= Mississippi Highway 313 =

Highway in Mississippi

Mississippi Highway 313
- MS 313 in red, unsigned county maintained portion in blue

Route information
- Maintained by MDOT
- Length: 8.518 mi (13.708 km) (1.385 miles (2.229 km) state maintained)
- Existed: 1958–present

Major junctions
- South end: Holland Road/Old Hudsonville Road in Hudsonville
- MS 7 near Hudsonville
- North end: US 72 in Slayden

Location
- Country: United States
- State: Mississippi
- Counties: Marshall

Highway system
- Mississippi State Highway System; Interstate; US; State
← MS 311	→ MS 314

Mississippi Highway 313 (MS 313) is a minor state highway in Marshall County, Mississippi, serving the communities of Atway and Hudsonville. The signed, state-maintained portion is approximately 1.3 miles (2.1 km) long and is generally a narrow two-lane route.

== Route description ==
MS 313 begins at an intersection with Holland Road/Old Hudsonville Road in the community of Hudsonville. Past this intersection, the road continues on as Old Hudsonville Road. The highway enters a long left curve for a tenth of a mile and intercepts Jackson Road. The road crosses the Mississippi Central Railroad and leaves Hudsonville. MS 313 heads west through rural areas for a mile before ending at MS 7. Despite ending at MS 7, the Mississippi Department of Transportation has the route continuing north to U.S. Route 72 in Slayden for a total distance of 9.825 miles (15.812 km). This portion is unsigned and is not maintained by the state.

== Major intersections ==
The entire route is in Marshall County.

Location	mi	km	Destinations	Notes
Hudsonville	0.0	0.0	Holland Road / Old Hudsonville Road	Southern terminus; end of state maintenance
Hudsonville	1.3	2.1	MS 7 – Holly Springs, Grand Junction	End of state maintenance
Slayden	8.5	13.7	US 72 / North Slayden Road	Northern terminus
1.000 mi = 1.609 km; 1.000 km = 0.621 mi
