= Waterford, Mississippi =

- Census-designated place
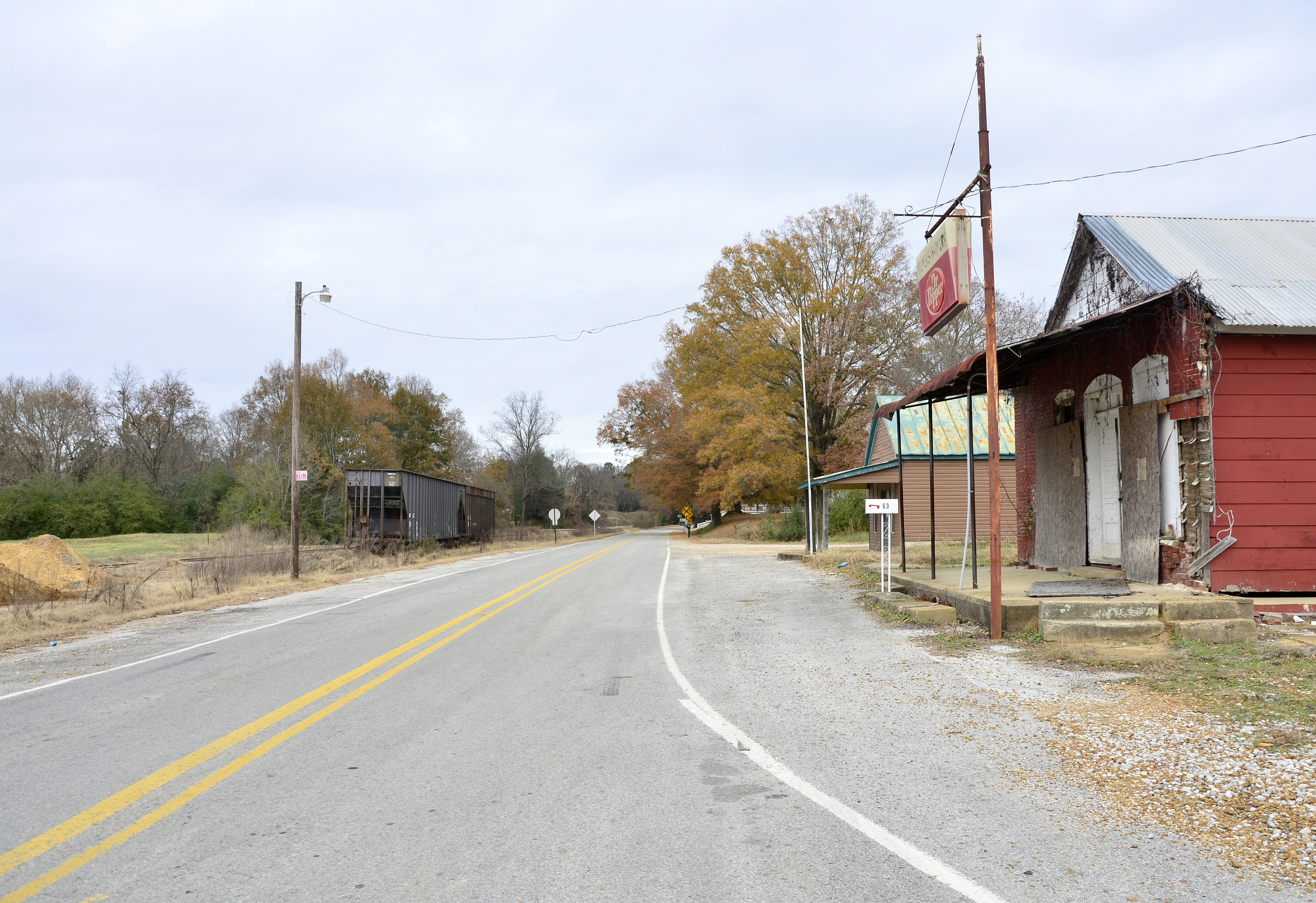
- Potts Camp Road in Waterford

- Location within Mississippi Location within the United States
- Coordinates: 34°38′58″N 89°27′27″W
- Country: United States
- State: Mississippi
- County: Marshall

Area
  - Total: 0.97 sq mi (2.52 km^{2})
  - Land: 0.97 sq mi (2.52 km^{2})
  - Water: 0 sq mi (0.00 km^{2})
- Elevation: 427 ft (130 m)

Population (2020)
  - Total: 112
  - Density: 115.2/sq mi (44.48/km^{2})
- Time zone: UTC-6 (CST)
  - Summer (DST): UTC-5 (CDT)
- ZIP code: 38685 (Waterford); 38635 (Holly Springs)
- Area code: 662
- GNIS feature ID: 2804172
- FIPS code: 28-77880

Waterford is a census-designated place (CDP) and unincorporated community in Marshall County, Mississippi, United States. It is a small town located between Holly Springs and Oxford on Highway 7.

Per the 2020 census, the population was 112.

== History ==
Waterford is named for the large amount of water that comes from Spring Creek. The original community of Waterford was located west of the present site. In 1900, Waterford had a population of 128. Waterford is located on the Mississippi Central Railroad and was established on February 8, 1838.

On November 29–30, 1862, Waterford was the site of a skirmish that was part of the Union Army's Mississippi Central Railroad Campaign.

== Geography ==
Waterford is in southern Marshall County. State Highway 7 passes through the west side of the community, leading north 8 miles (13 km) to Holly Springs, the county seat, and south 22 miles (35 km) to Oxford. Wall Doxey State Park borders Waterford to the north and west, and the proclamation boundary of Holly Springs National Forest is to the east.

According to the U.S. Census Bureau, the Waterford CDP has an area of 0.97 square miles (2.51 km^{2}), all land. Little Spring Creek borders the community to the west, flowing out of Wall Doxey State Park and continuing south toward the Little Tallahatchie River.

== Demographics ==
Historical population
Census	Pop.	Note	%±
2020	112		—
U.S. Decennial Census; 2020

Waterford was first listed as a census designated place in the 2020 U.S. census.

=== 2020 census ===
Waterford CDP, Mississippi – Racial and ethnic composition Note: the US Census treats Hispanic/Latino as an ethnic category. This table excludes Latinos from the racial categories and assigns them to a separate category. Hispanics/Latinos may be of any race.
Race / Ethnicity (NH = Non-Hispanic)	Pop 2020	% 2020
White alone (NH)	86	76.79%
Black or African American alone (NH)	22	19.64%
Native American or Alaska Native alone (NH)	1	0.89%
Asian alone (NH)	0	0.00%
Pacific Islander alone (NH)	0	0.00%
Some Other Race alone (NH)	0	0.00%
Mixed Race or Multi-Racial (NH)	1	0.89%
Hispanic or Latino (any race)	2	1.79%
Total	112	100.00%
