= Mount Pleasant, Mississippi =

- Census-designated place
- Location within Mississippi Location within the United States
- Coordinates: 34°57′14″N 89°31′32″W
- Country: United States
- State: Mississippi
- County: Marshall

Area
  - Total: 2.39 sq mi (6.20 km^{2})
  - Land: 2.39 sq mi (6.20 km^{2})
  - Water: 0 sq mi (0.00 km^{2})
- Elevation: 463 ft (141 m)

Population (2020)
  - Total: 293
  - Density: 122.3/sq mi (47.23/km^{2})
- Time zone: UTC-6 (Central (CST))
  - Summer (DST): UTC-5 (CDT)
- ZIP codes: 38635; 38649 (PO box); 38661 (Red Banks); 38611 (Byhalia)
- Area code: 662
- GNIS feature ID: 2804171
- FIPS Code: 28-49640

Mount Pleasant (or Mt. Pleasant) is a census-designated place (CDP) and unincorporated community in Marshall County, Mississippi, United States, located along U.S. Highway 72 at State Highway 311. The community has a volunteer fire department on Boswell Road, and a K-12 school located off Highway 72.

Per the 2020 Census, thr population was 293.

== Geography ==
Mount Pleasant is in northern Marshall County, less than 3 miles (5 km) south of the Tennessee border. US Highway 72, a four-lane highway, passes through the north side of the community, leading east 57 miles (92 km) to Corinth and northwest 11 miles (18 km) to Collierville, Tennessee, and 34 miles (55 km) to Memphis. State Highway 311 leads south from Mount Pleasant 14 miles (23 km) to Holly Springs, the Marshall county seat. Nearby unincorporated communities include Cayce to the west, Taska to the southwest, and Slayden to the east.

According to the U.S. Census Bureau, the Mount Pleasant CDP has an area of 2.4 square miles (6.2 km^{2}), all land. Little Coldwater Creek forms the southern boundary of the CDP; the creek is a west-flowing tributary of the Coldwater River, part of the Tallahatchie River watershed.

== Demographics ==
Historical population
Census	Pop.	Note	%±
2020	293		—
U.S. Decennial Census; 2020

Mount Pleasant was first listed as a census designated place in the 2020 U.S. census.

=== 2020 census ===
Mount Pleasant CDP, Mississippi – Racial and ethnic composition Note: the US Census treats Hispanic/Latino as an ethnic category. This table excludes Latinos from the racial categories and assigns them to a separate category. Hispanics/Latinos may be of any race.
Race / Ethnicity (NH = Non-Hispanic)	Pop 2020	% 2020
White alone (NH)	250	85.32%
Black or African American alone (NH)	31	10.58%
Native American or Alaska Native alone (NH)	0	0.00%
Asian alone (NH)	0	0.00%
Native Hawaiian or Pacific Islander alone (NH)	1	0.34%
Other race alone (NH)	0	0.00%
Mixed race or Multiracial (NH)	4	1.37%
Hispanic or Latino (any race)	7	2.39%
Total	293	100.00%

== Notable people ==
- Joseph N. Brown, member of the Mississippi Senate from 1918 to 1922
- Benn Karr, former Major League Baseball pitcher
