= Mississippi Highway 310 =

State Highway in Mississippi, USA

Mississippi Highway 310

Route information
- Maintained by MDOT
- Length: 44.484 mi (71.590 km)
- Existed: 1950–present

Major junctions
- West end: MS 3 in Crenshaw
- US 51 in Como; I-55 near Como
- East end: MS 7 in Malone

Location
- Country: United States
- State: Mississippi
- Counties: Panola, Lafayette, Marshall

Highway system
- Mississippi State Highway System; Interstate; US; State
← I-310	→ MS 311

Mississippi Highway 310 (MS 310) is a 44.5-mile-long (71.6 km) east-west state highway in northern Mississippi. It runs from MS 3 in Crenshaw to MS 7 in the unincorporated area of Malone.

== Route description ==
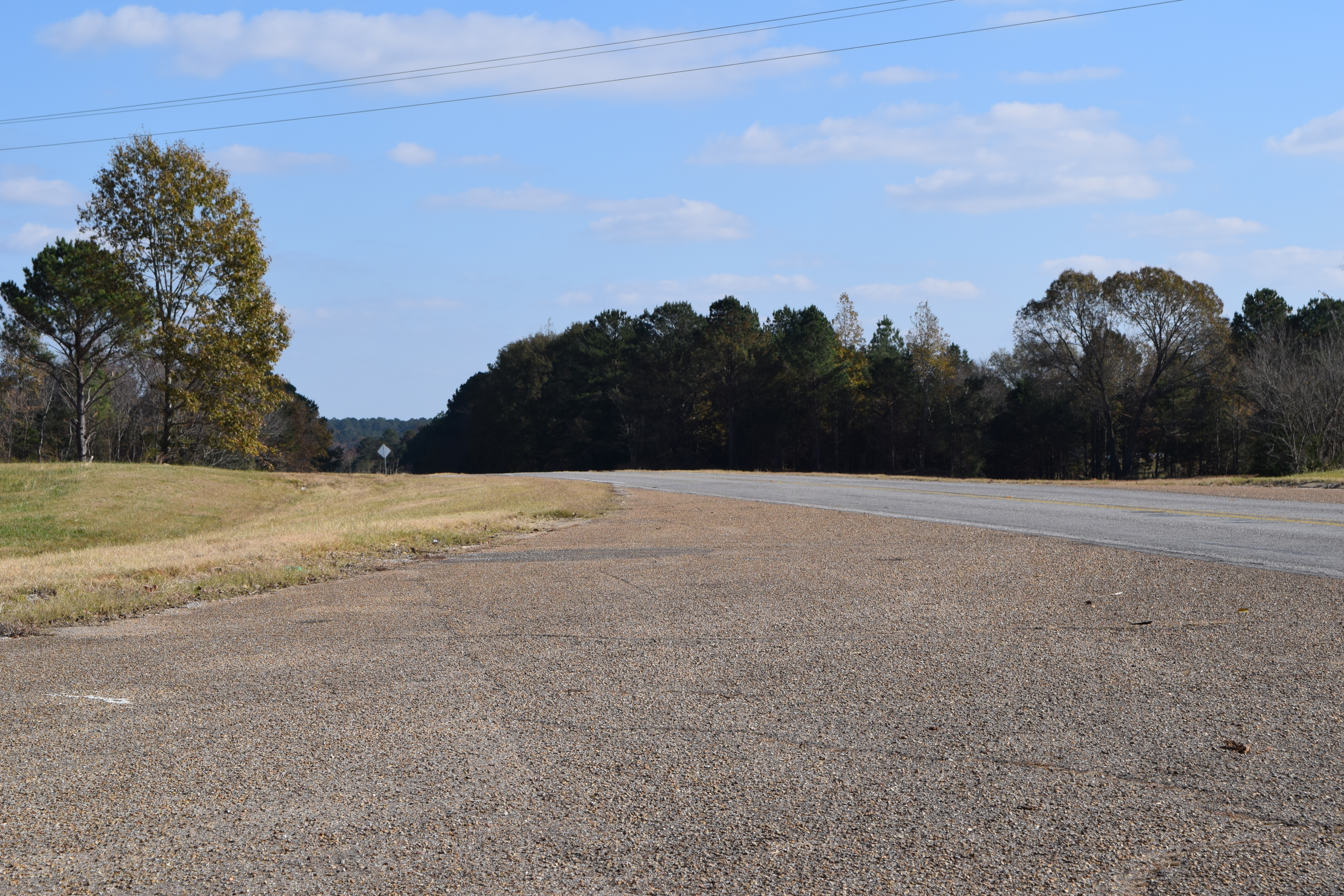
Mississippi Highway 310 near its eastern terminus in Marshall County

MS 310 begins on the eastern edge of the Mississippi Delta region in Panola County at an intersection with MS 3 in the very center of downtown Crenshaw. It immediately leaves downtown and passes through some neighborhoods before leaving the town to climb up some Loess bluff to leave the Delta. It travels eastward through a mix of woodlands and flat farmland for the next several miles, passing through the community of Longtown, to enter the town of Como at an intersection with U.S. Route 51 (US 51). The passes through some as it traverses the southern end of downtown, where it crosses a railroad track, before leaving Como at an interchange with Interstate 55 (I-55) at exit 257. MS 310 travels through more flat farmland for several more miles before entering the North Central Hills region, where it winds its way northeast through rugged, wooded, and hilly terrain as it travels along the northern coastline of Sardis Lake. It crosses into Lafayette County after a few miles.

MS 310 continues traveling northeast to pass through the communities of Harmontown and Blackwater (where it crosses Blackwater Creek) before entering into neighboring Marshall County. It passes through the community of Laws Hill, where the highway curves more eastward, before passing through more hilly woodlands to come to an end at an intersection with MS 7.

The entire length of Mississippi Highway 310 is a rural, two-lane, state highway for its entire length.

== Major intersections ==
County	Location	mi	km	Destinations	Notes
Panola	Crenshaw	0.000	0.000	MS 3 (Broad Street) / East Missouri Avenue – Marks, Tunica	Western terminus
Panola	Como	14.211	22.870	US 51 – Senatobia, Sardis	
Panola	Como	15.724– 15.831	25.305– 25.478	I-55 – Grenada, Memphis	I-55 exit 257
Lafayette		30.809	49.582	MS 305 east / CR 517 / CR 515	Western terminus of unsigned segment of MS 305
Marshall	Malone	44.484	71.590	MS 7 – Oxford, Holly Springs	Eastern terminus
1.000 mi = 1.609 km; 1.000 km = 0.621 mi
