= Taska =

Taska may refer to:

- Taska, Mississippi, a community in the United States
- Táska, a village in Hungary
- Taska Film, an Estonian film production company
- Ilmar Taska (born 1953), Estonian filmmaker and writer
- Kristian Taska (born 1973), Estonian filmmaker
- Bohdan Taska (born 1959), Czech Lutheran clergyman
