= Quito, Mississippi =

- Unincorporated community
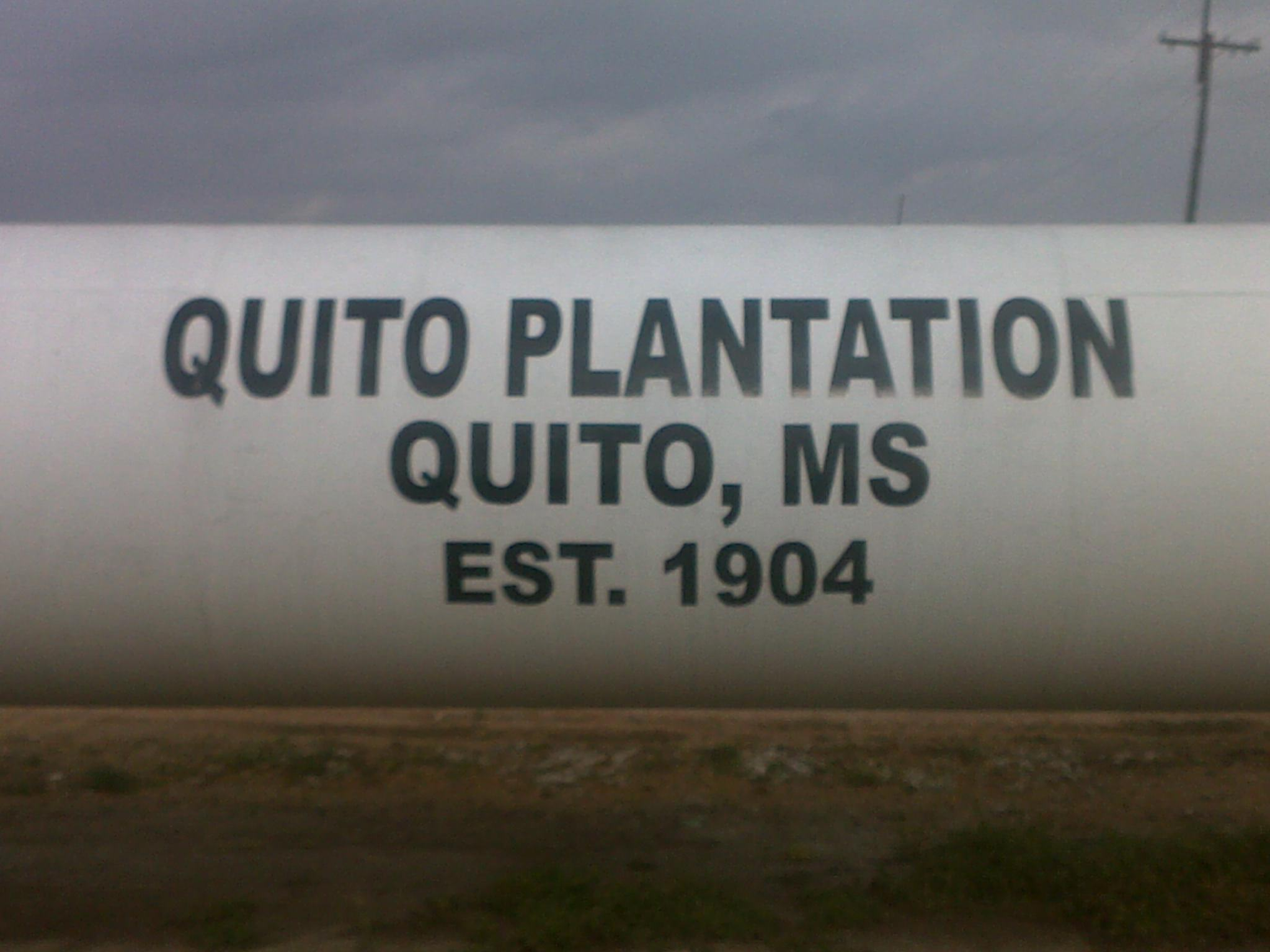

- Location within Mississippi Location within the United States
- Coordinates: 33°26′19″N 90°18′04″W
- Country: United States
- State: Mississippi
- County: Leflore
- Elevation: 125 ft (38 m)
- Time zone: UTC-6 (Central (CST))
  - Summer (DST): UTC-5 (CDT)
- ZIP code: 38941
- Area code: 662
- GNIS feature ID: 676441

Quito is an unincorporated community located in Leflore County, Mississippi. Quito is approximately 6 miles (9.7 km) north of Morgan City and 3 miles (4.8 km) south of Itta Bena along Mississippi Highway 7.

It is part of the Greenwood, Mississippi micropolitan area.

Quito is located on the former Columbus and Greenville Railroad. A post office operated under the name Quito from 1907 to 1918.

It was once believed that blues musician Robert Johnson was buried in the Payne Chapel cemetery, but evidence now points to him being buried at Little Zion M.B. Church Cemetery north of Greenwood.

== Gallery ==
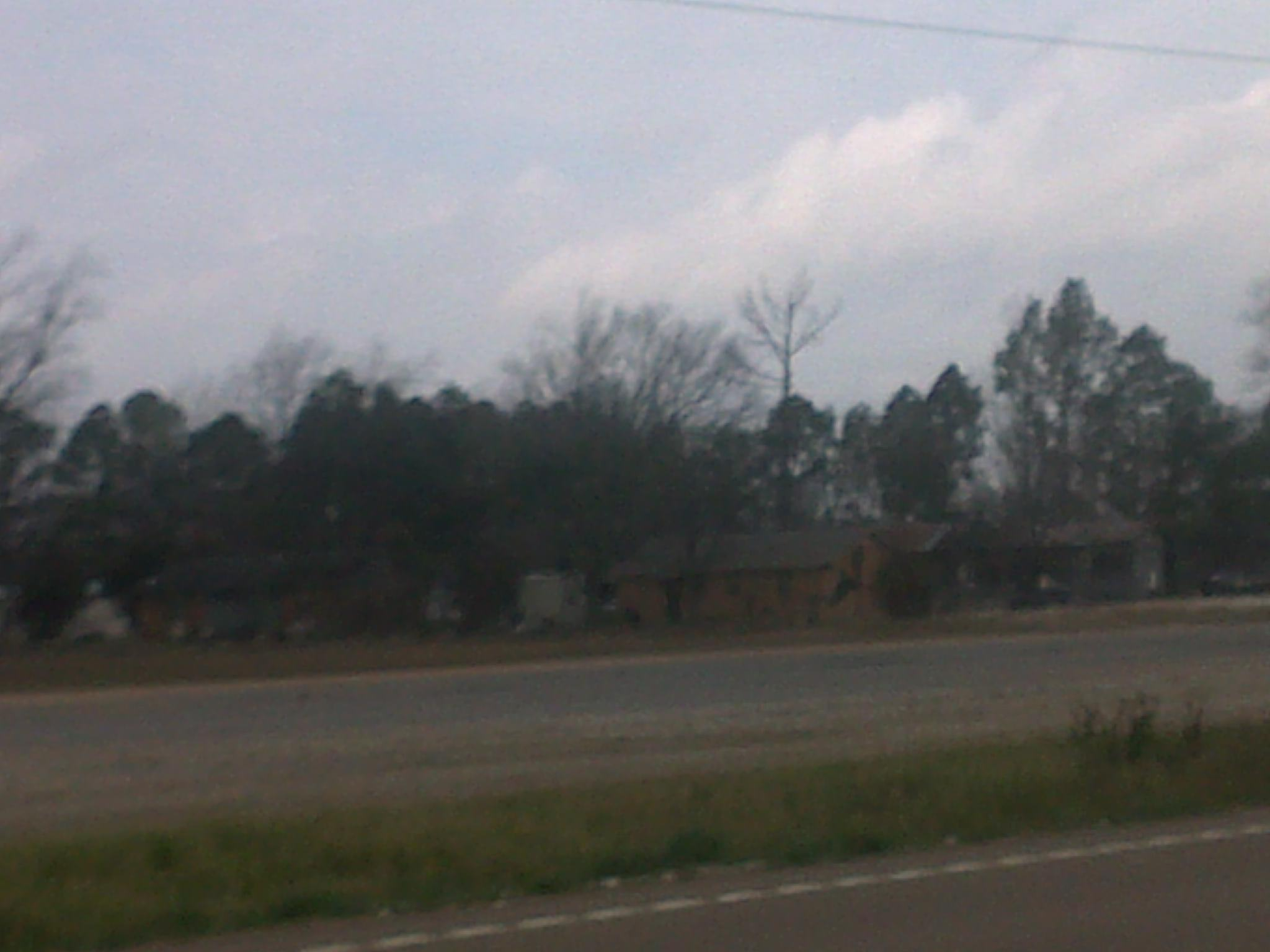
View of Quito from Mississippi Highway 7

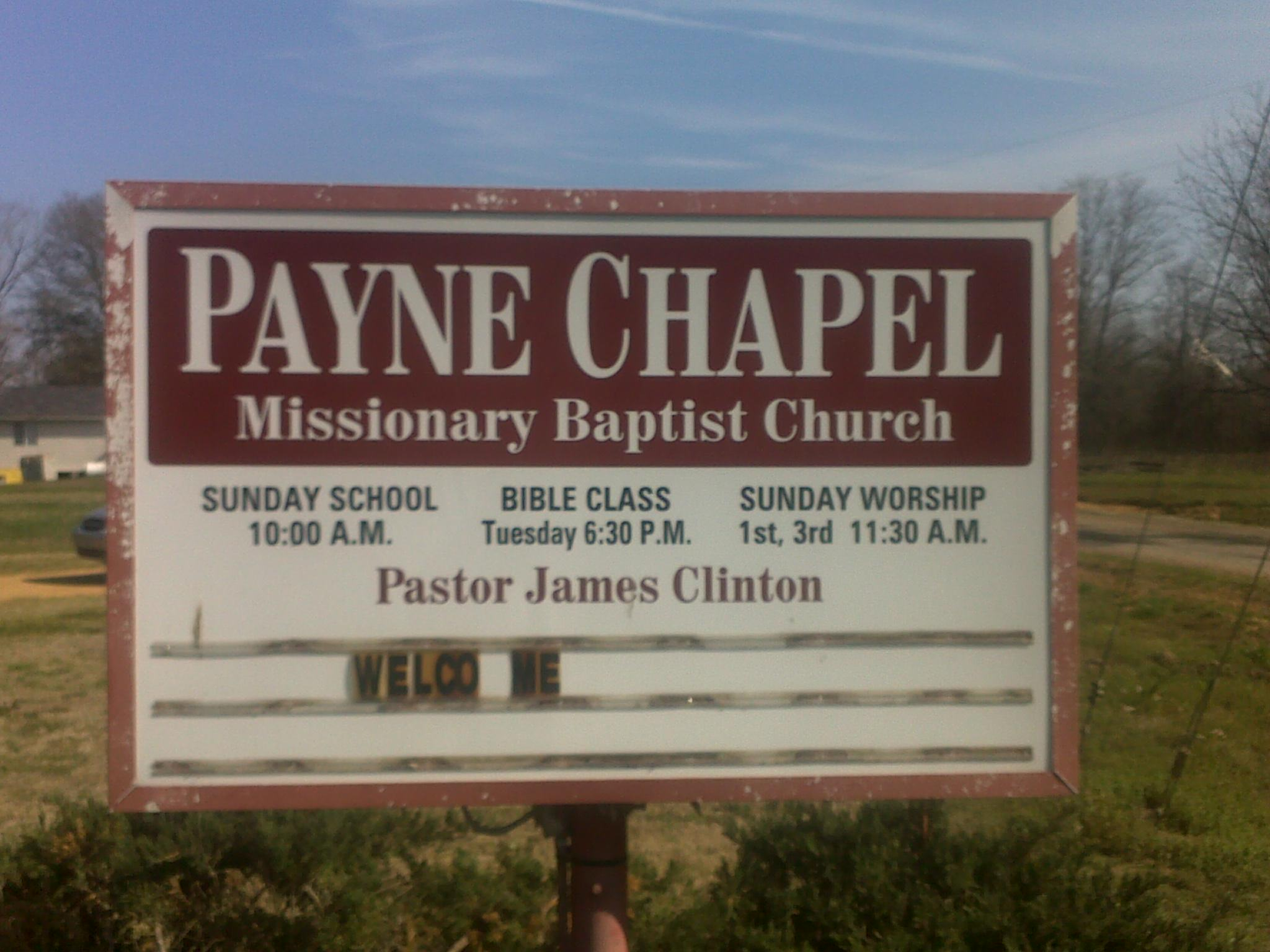
Payne Chapel M.B. Church along County Road 167 in Leflore County
