= Early Grove, Mississippi =

- Unincorporated community
- Location within Mississippi Location within the United States
- Coordinates: 34°58′33″N 89°23′05″W
- Country: United States
- State: Mississippi
- County: Marshall
- Elevation: 489 ft (149 m)
- Time zone: UTC-6 (Central (CST))
  - Summer (DST): UTC-5 (CDT)
- ZIP code: 38642
- Area code: 662
- GNIS feature ID: 691832

Early Grove is an unincorporated community located in Marshall County, Mississippi, United States, near the Mississippi/Tennessee border. Early Grove is approximately 11 miles (18 km) west of Michigan City, approximately 10 miles (16 km) east of Mount Pleasant and approximately 20 miles (32 km) southeast of Collierville, north of U.S. Route 72.

Early Grove was settled along the route of the Holly Springs and Moscow Road.

A post office operated under the name Early Grove from 1848 to 1908. In 1900, Early Grove had a population of 42 and two churches.
