= Mahon, Mississippi =

- Unincorporated community
- Location within Mississippi Location within the United States
- Coordinates: 34°48′53″N 89°30′55″W
- Country: United States
- State: Mississippi
- County: Marshall
- Elevation: 499 ft (152 m)
- Time zone: UTC-6 (Central (CST))
  - Summer (DST): UTC-5 (CDT)
- GNIS feature ID: 692035

Mahon is an unincorporated community in Marshall County, Mississippi, United States.

== History ==
A post office called Mahon was established in 1890, and remained in operation until 1919. The community was named for John Mahon.

The population in 1900 was 41.
