= Longtown, Mississippi =

- Unincorporated community
- Location within Mississippi Location within the United States
- Coordinates: 34°30′39″N 90°07′27″W
- Country: United States
- State: Mississippi
- County: Panola
- Elevation: 351 ft (107 m)
- Time zone: UTC-6 (Central (CST))
  - Summer (DST): UTC-5 (CDT)
- ZIP code: 38621
- Area code: 662
- GNIS feature ID: 672855

Longtown is an unincorporated community located in Panola County, Mississippi. Longtown is approximately 5.3 miles (8.5 km) south of Pleasant Grove and approximately 4.3 miles (6.9 km) east-southeast of Askew on Mississippi Highway 310.

== History ==
Longtown was incorporated in 1882 and unincorporated at a later date.

In 1900, Longtown had two churches and a population of 175.

Longtown was formerly served by the Longtown Academy.

A post office operated under the name Longtown from 1850 to 1909.

== Notable person ==
- Mabel Welch (1890-1981), the second registered female architect in Texas, was born on a plantation near Longtown.
