= Wyatt, Mississippi =

- Ghost town
- Location within Mississippi Location within the United States
- Coordinates: 34°32′56″N 89°34′07″W
- Country: United States
- State: Mississippi
- County: Lafayette
- Established: 1836
- Elevation: 331 ft (101 m)

Population
  - Total: 0
- Time zone: UTC-6 (Central (CST))
  - Summer (DST): UTC-5 (CDT)
- Area code: 662

Wyatt is a former town in Lafayette County, Mississippi. It was located on the banks of the Tallahatchie River, and is located Southeast of Blackwater.

The town was one of the earliest settlements in the county, being established in 1836 as Mitchell's Bluffs. The settlement was purchased by Wyatt Mitchell and Volney Peel on May, 24th 1837 from a Chickasaw man called Slone Love, who operated the Love's Ferry in the village. The town was incorporated in 1838, with the town being renamed to Wyatt, after Mitchell Wyatt. The town had fourteen business houses, a Masonic Lodge and a large hotel. The town was thought to be destined to be a rival port to Memphis, Tennessee, and was a cotton port for local farmers.

The town was a large shipping port in the 1830s, and was largely developed by Col. Volney Peel, of Marshall County, under the belief that the town would grow into a city. He erected multiple houses and invested into the town, but lost lots of money when the town failed. The town had a gin factory, owned by a Mr. Brooks, who manufactured Brooks Gin at the factory. A bridge was built over the Tallahatchie to replace the old Love's Ferry, and a Turnpike road was built across the swamp by the river.

There is a cemetery in Wyatt, which was open until 1920, and was maintained until the 1950s. Some graves have since been lost due to erosion, theft and vandalism.

The town declined after the Panic of 1837, and by the bypass of the town by the Mississippi Central Railroad in 1857, and was completely depopulated by the 1870s.

Residents of the town included Thomas H. Allen of Memphis and New Orleans, A. Gillis, Andrew Peterson, Major Alston, Dr. R. O. Carter, Dr. Edward McMucken, and Dr. Robert Watt (d. 1843), a physician, who studied under Dr. Gregory, and purchased a plantation near Wyatt and established an office there. The last resident, Mr. McConley moved to Abbeville, Lafayette by 1902.

During the American Civil War, the 5th Mississippi Cavalry Regiment guarded the Wyatt Bridge crossing in early October 1864, and fought the Battle of Wyatt on the site of the town on October 13th, and the town as completely burned by Federal Forces. The confederate army lost 9 men, and 28 were wounded. The federal army lost 6 men and 20 were wounded.

The site of the town was partially flooded by the construction of the Sardis Lake (Mississippi) in the 1930s, with the rest now being woodland.

== Wyatt Bridge and Wyatt Crossing ==
Wyatt Bridge was a hamlet Southwest of Wyatt, and emerged during the Mid 19th Century at the crossing point over the Tallahatchee. It was largely depopulated by the 1940s, and is now the locality of Wyatt Crossing.
