= Benn Karr =

American baseball player (1893–1968)

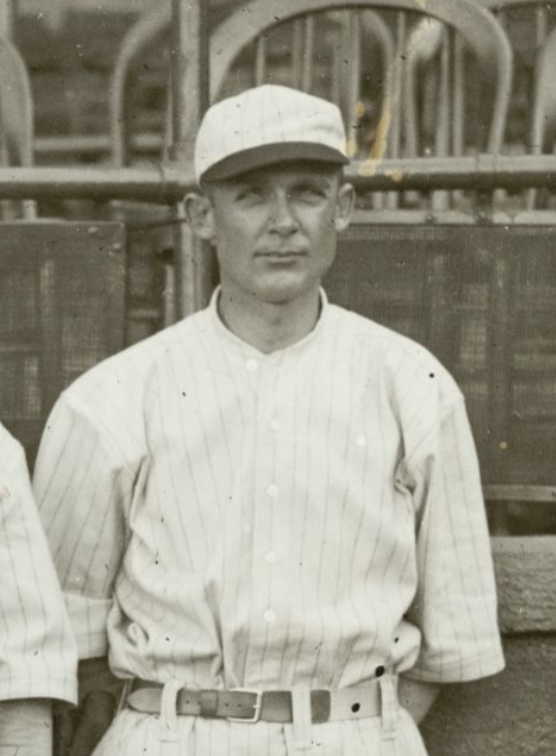
- Pitcher
- Born: November 28, 1893; Mount Pleasant, Mississippi, U.S.
- Died: December 8, 1968 (aged 75); Memphis, Tennessee, U.S.
- Batted: Left Threw: Right

MLB debut
- April 20, 1920, for the Boston Red Sox

Last MLB appearance
- July 3, 1927, for the Cleveland Indians

MLB statistics
- Win–loss record: 35–48
- Earned run average: 4.60
- Strikeouts: 180
- Stats at Baseball Reference

Teams
- Boston Red Sox (1920–1922); Cleveland Indians (1925–1927)

Benjamin Joyce Karr (November 28, 1893 – December 8, 1968), known as Benn Karr and nicknamed Baldy Karr, was an American Major League Baseball pitcher who played between 1920 and 1927 for the Boston Red Sox (1920–22) and Cleveland Indians (1925–27). Listed at 6 ft 0 in (1.83 m), 175 lb., Karr batted left-handed and threw right-handed. He was born in Mount Pleasant, Mississippi.

In a six-season career, Karr posted a 35–48 record with 180 strikeouts and a 4.60 ERA in 177 appearances, including 58 starts, 29 complete games, one shutout, five saves, and 780 1/3 innings of work. He also pitched in the minors for 15 years and served in the U.S. Army during World War I.

Karr died in Memphis, Tennessee at age 75.
