= Mississippi Highway 314 =

Highway in Lafayette County, Mississippi

Mississippi Highway 314

Route information
- Maintained by MDOT and City of Oxford
- Length: 7.278 mi (11.713 km)
- Existed: 1957–present

Major junctions
- West end: CR 100 near Oxford
- East end: MS 7 / MS 334 in Oxford

Location
- Country: United States
- State: Mississippi
- Counties: Lafayette

Highway system
- Mississippi State Highway System; Interstate; US; State
← MS 313	→ MS 315

Mississippi Highway 314 (MS 314) is a state highway in Lafayette County, serving the city of Oxford. It is generally a two-lane roadway.

The road begins northwest of Oxford and travels southeast towards the city and the campus of the University of Mississippi before traveling through the city's downtown area. The highway ends at an interchange with MS 7 where the road continues as MS 334.

== Route description ==
The western terminus of MS 314 is in rural Lafayette County northwest of Oxford. West of here, the roadway continues as Lafayette County Road 100 heading towards the Sardis Reservoir. MS 314 heads southeast as a two-lane road past churches and a sports field complex. Passing through a roundabout, the road gains bike lanes on both sides of the highway as it passes small condominiums and the University-Oxford Airport as it enters the city limits of Oxford. MS 314 makes a sharp curve to the south to come to an intersection with Jackson Avenue, former MS 6, across the road from the University of Mississippi campus. MS 314 becomes four lanes wide with a center turn lane as it skirts around the north side of the college campus heading east. The road narrows to two lanes and passes under the Oxford Depot Trail (formerly Mississippi Central Railroad), MS 314 turns to the south along Ninth Avenue before Jackson Avenue reaches the downtown portion of Oxford. It heads south for three blocks before turning back to the east on University Avenue. Heading through the city's business district, MS 314 widens to four lanes before it ends at a diamond interchange with MS 7. University Avenue continues east as MS 334 which also has its terminus at this interchange.

MS 314 is state-maintained on its portion west of Oxford city limits and in the vicinity of the MS 7 interchange. It is otherwise maintained by the city of Oxford.

== History ==
The highway was established as an unpaved road around 1957 running from the Sardis Reservoir into Oxford. By 1994, most of the road had been paved. By 2010, the road had been truncated to a total length of 6.4 miles (10.3 km) MS 314 was extended to its current length of 7.3 miles (11.7 km) in 2014.

In 2011, Kevser Ermin, a doctoral student at the University of Mississippi, tragically lost her life while on a training ride on Old Sardis Road, which is part of the highway. In her honor, Lafayette County decided to rename a portion of Old Sardis Road after the student. The segment of road, measuring four-and-a-half miles and located on Mississippi Highway 314, commonly referred to as Old Sardis Road locally, was officially designated as the "Kevser Ermin Memorial Highway" following the accident.

== Major intersections ==
The entire route is in Lafayette County.

Location	mi	km	Destinations	Notes
	0.000	0.000	CR 100	Western terminus
Oxford	7.278	11.713	MS 7 / MS 334 east (University Avenue) – Water Valley, Holly Springs	Eastern terminus; interchange; western terminus of MS 334
1.000 mi = 1.609 km; 1.000 km = 0.621 mi
