= Wall Doxey State Park =

State park in Mississippi, United States

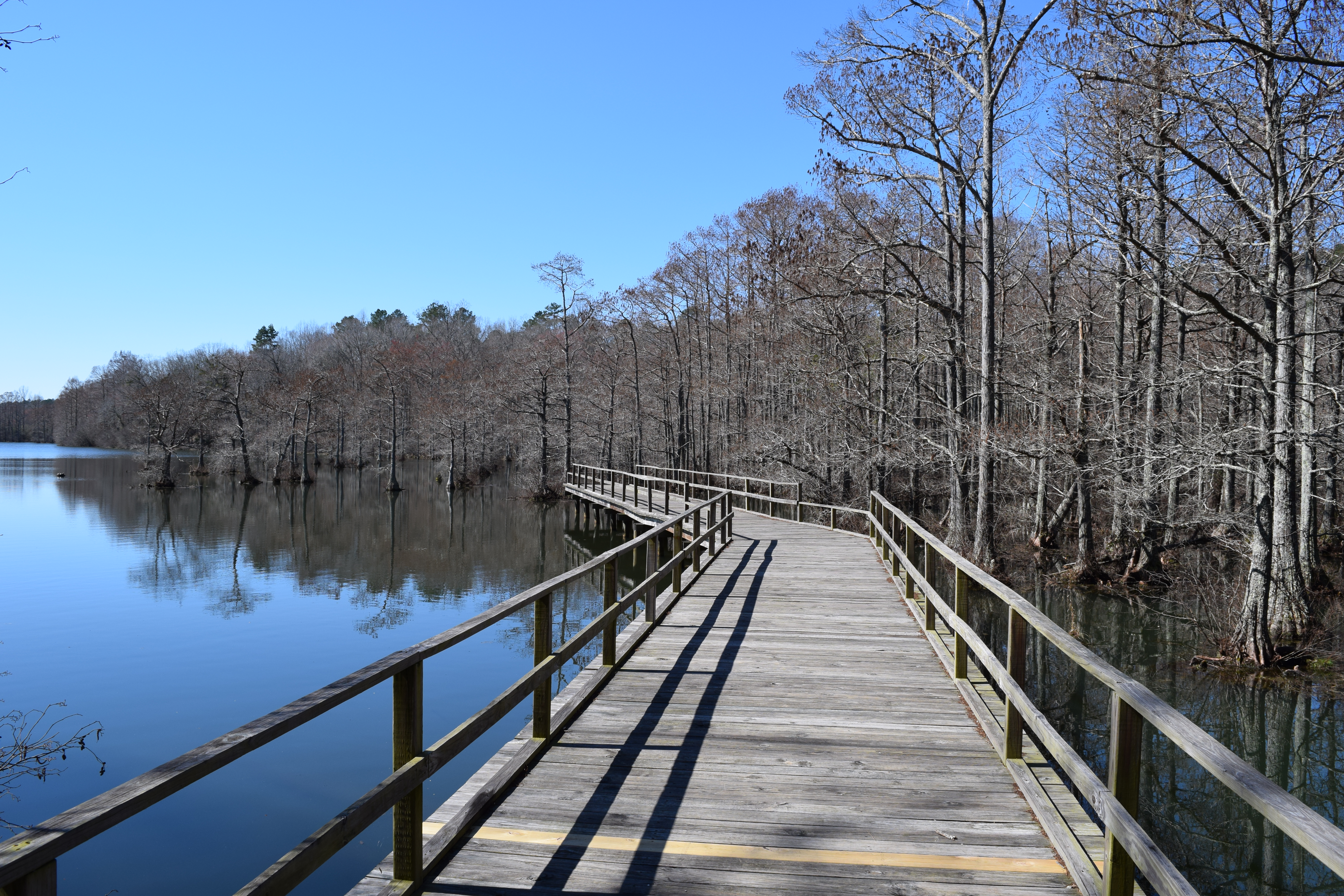

- Location within Mississippi
- Location: Marshall County, Mississippi, United States
- Coordinates: 34°39′53″N 89°27′46″W
- Area: 750 acres (300 ha) land; 60 acres (24 ha) water
- Elevation: 338 ft (103 m)
- Established: 1935
- Administrator: Mississippi Department of Wildlife, Fisheries and Parks
- Designation: Mississippi state park
- Named for: Senator Wall Doxey
- Website: Wall Doxey State Park
- Wall Doxey State Park
- U.S. National Register of Historic Places
- U.S. Historic district
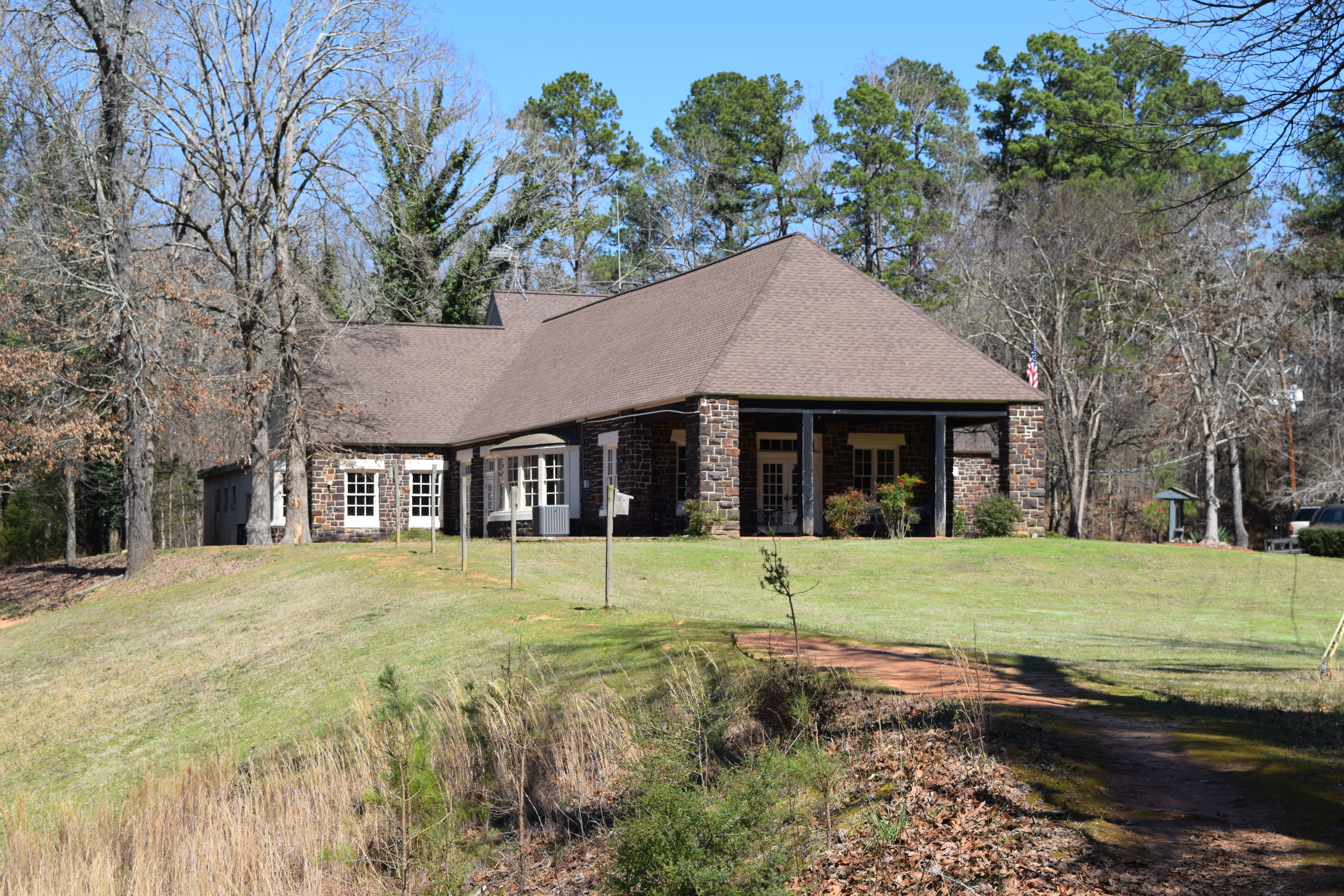
- Park office building
- Nearest city: Holly Springs, Mississippi
- Area: 20 acres (8.1 ha)
- Built: 1935
- Built by: Civilian Conservation Corps; National Youth Administration
- Architectural style: Rustic
- MPS: State Parks in Mississippi built by the CCC between 1934 - 1942
- NRHP reference No.: 97001437
- Added to NRHP: December 1, 1997

Wall Doxey State Park is a public recreation area located off Mississippi Highway 7, seven miles (11 km) south of Holly Springs, Mississippi. The state park is centered on 60-acre (24 ha) Spring Lake. It is named for Mississippi politician Wall Doxey.

== History ==
Wall Doxey State Park is one of the original state parks built in Mississippi in the 1930s by the Civilian Conservation Corps. Originally known as Spring Lake, the park was the eighth park in Mississippi created by the CCC. The CCC began work 1935; the park opened in 1938. Workers with the National Youth Administration also contributed to the park's development, adding a cabin in 1938. In 1956, the park was renamed in honor of Mississippi politician Wall Doxey.

== Activities and amenities ==
The park features lake fishing, primitive and developed campsites, cabins and cottage, 2.5-mile (4.0 km) nature trail, picnic area, and two disc golf courses. A narrow levee surrounds a third of the spring-fed lake which, in its shallows, has cypresses and dense vegetation.
