= Blackwater, Mississippi =

- Unincorporated community
- Location within Mississippi Location within the United States
- Coordinates: 34°33′21″N 89°35′48″W
- Country: United States
- State: Mississippi
- County: Lafayette; Marshall
- Established: 1859
- Elevation: 325 ft (99 m)
- Time zone: UTC-6 (Central (CST))
  - Summer (DST): UTC-5 (CDT)
- Area code: 662
- GNIS feature ID: 691708

Blackwater is an unincorporated community in Marshall County and Lafayette County, Mississippi. It is located Northwest of Wyatt.

The land on the site of the settlement was purchased by Wyatt C. Mitchell in 1836. Blackwater was established in 1859 by E. M. Matthews and was named after Blackwater Creek, which the settlement is next to. Blackwater was largely depopulated during the 1930s due to the construction of the Sardis Lake. The modern existing settlement on Hartley Road was constructed in the 1930s.

The settlement had several stores, a cotton gin, and a post office under David W. Billingsley Sr., in 1900. The post office later moved to the Roy family store until it closed in 1918.
