= Florewood State Park =

State park in Mississippi, United States

- Location within Mississippi
- Location: Greenwood, Mississippi, United States
- Coordinates: 33°31′30″N 90°15′01″W
- Elevation: 131 ft (40 m)
- Established: 1973
- Administrator: Leflore County
- Designation: Mississippi state park
- Website: Official website

Florewood State Park, also known as Florewood River Plantation State Park, is a public recreation area in the U.S. state of Mississippi, operated by the Leflore County Board of Supervisors. The state park is located off U.S. Highway 82 on the western edge of Greenwood. It is only open on Saturdays for fishing.

== History ==
The park originated in 1973 when the Moor family deeded property to the state of Mississippi for use as a "living historical plantation." In 2005, a bill introduced before the Mississippi Legislature authorized the disposal of Florewood Plantation State Park and four other state parks. An auction company offered the "entirety of Florewood River Plantation State Park" at auction on July 23, 2005. Although the department intended to keep the park open as a day-use facility with "picnic pavilions and picnic tables," the park was leased to Leflore County in 2007.

In 2014, the Leflore County Board of Supervisors leased the shuttered state park to Hollywood movie producers for the shooting of "By Way of Helena" (later released as "The Duel"), a feature film with Woody Harrelson and Liam Hemsworth.

After being stocked with blue gill in 2018, Florewood River Plantation Lake was re-opened to the public for fishing in 2021.
