= Cayce, Mississippi =

- Unincorporated community
- Location within Mississippi Location within the United States
- Coordinates: 34°57′19″N 89°37′05″W
- Country: United States
- State: Mississippi
- County: Marshall
- Elevation: 420 ft (130 m)
- Time zone: UTC-6 (Central (CST))
  - Summer (DST): UTC-5 (CDT)
- Area code: 662
- GNIS feature ID: 668177

Cayce, (also known as Bainville or Banesville) is an unincorporated community in Marshall County, Mississippi, United States.

== History ==
The community was first known as Bainsville and was settled prior to the Civil War. A post office operated under the name Banesville from 1884 to 1888 and under the name Cayce from 1888 to 1907. In 1900, Cayce had a population of 36.

== Notable person ==
- Rufus Thomas, musician and comedian; was born here, but grew up in Memphis, Tennessee.
