= Hardy, Mississippi =

- Unincorporated community
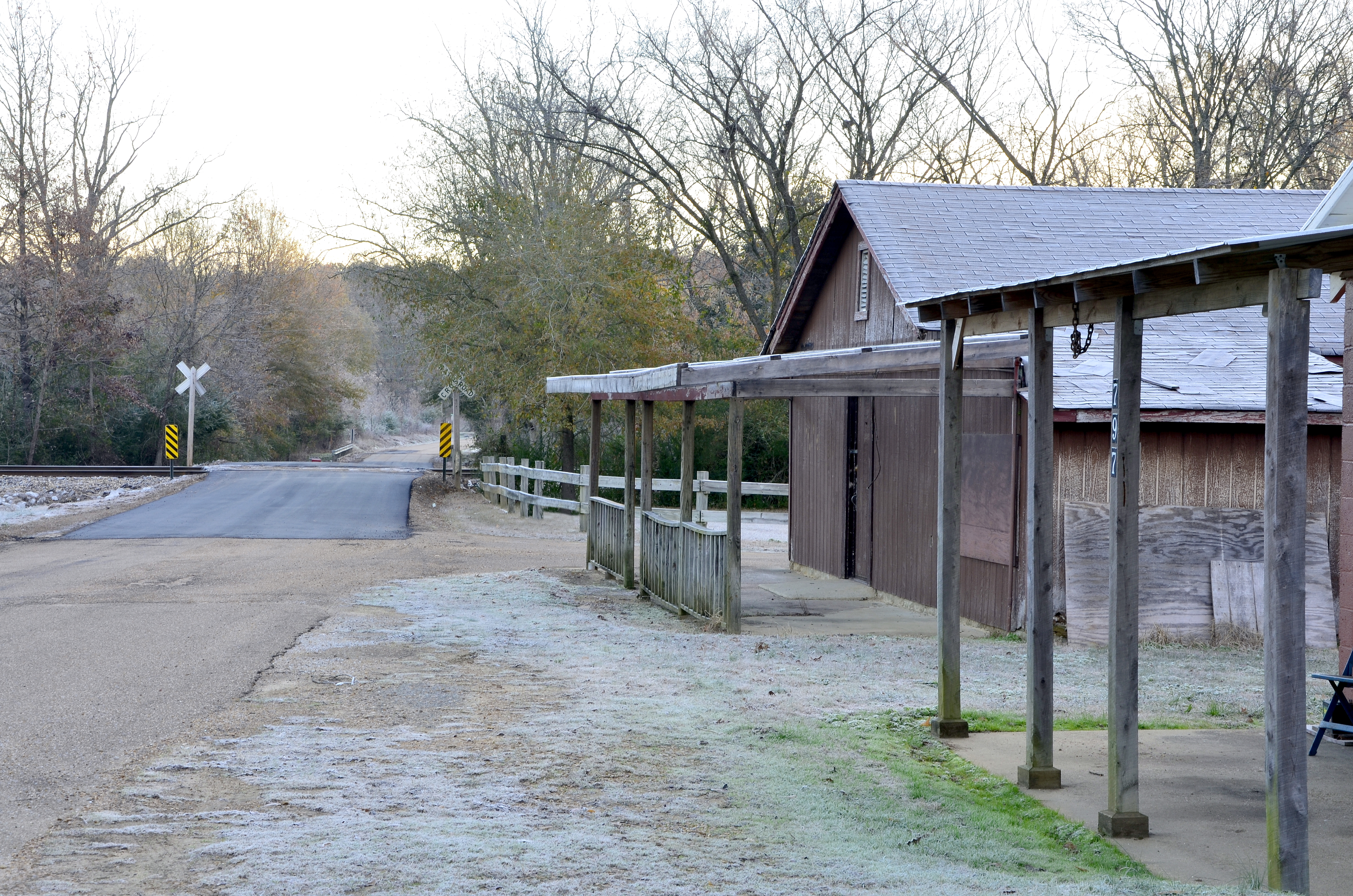
- Hardy

- Location within Mississippi Location within the United States
- Coordinates: 33°52′55″N 89°49′46″W
- Country: United States
- State: Mississippi
- County: Grenada
- Elevation: 246 ft (75 m)
- Time zone: UTC-6 (Central (CST))
  - Summer (DST): UTC-5 (CDT)
- ZIP code: 38901
- Area code: 662
- GNIS feature ID: 693415

Hardy is an unincorporated community located in Grenada County, Mississippi and part of the Grenada Micropolitan Statistical Area . Hardy is approximately 10 miles (16 km) north of Grenada near Interstate 55.

The community was named for Richard Hardy, who owned the land on which the railroad depot was built.

Hardy is located on the former Illinois Central Railroad.

A post office operated under the name Hardy from 1868 to 1966.
