= Mississippi Highway 311 =

Highway in Mississippi

Mississippi Highway 311
- MS 311 highlighted in red

Route information
- Maintained by MDOT
- Length: 12.960 mi (20.857 km)
- Existed: 1957–present

Major junctions
- South end: MS 7 in Holly Springs
- North end: US 72 in Mt. Pleasant

Location
- Country: United States
- State: Mississippi
- Counties: Marshall

Highway system
- Mississippi State Highway System; Interstate; US; State
← MS 310	→ MS 313

Mississippi Highway 311 (MS 311) is a state highway located in Marshall County, Mississippi, United States. The route runs 12.960 mi (20.857 km) from MS 7 in Holly Springs north to U.S. Route 72 (US 72) in Mount Pleasant. The route is a two-lane undivided road its entire length and passes through rural areas. MS 311 was designated onto its current alignment in 1957, and was fully paved from a gravel road by the 1960s.

== Route description ==
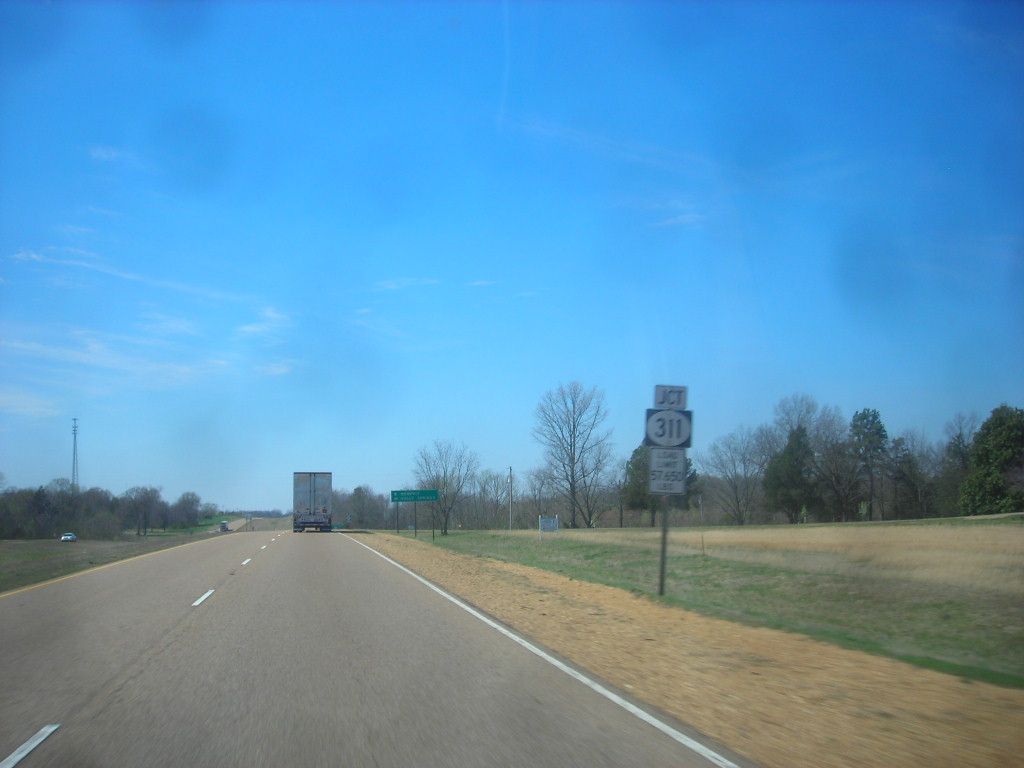
Junction MS 311 sign along westbound US 72

MS 311 begins at an intersection with MS 7 in the northern part of Holly Springs, heading northwest on two-lane undivided Mount Pleasant Road. The route passes through wooded areas with some homes and businesses as it comes to an intersection with the Holly Springs Bypass and makes a left turn to continue to the northwest and leaves the city. Upon leaving Holly Springs, the road continues through forested areas with some farm fields and residences. Farther north, the highway reaches the community of Mount Pleasant. MS 311 passes a few homes and businesses within Mount Pleasant before reaching its northern terminus at the US 72 intersection. At this point, the road continues north as Rossville Road. MS 311 is legally defined in Mississippi Code § 65-3-3.

== History ==
MS 311 was designated in 1957 for a gravel road connecting Holly Springs to Mt. Pleasant. By 1960, the route was paved except for a small portion halfway between Holly Springs and Mt. Pleasant. In 1965, the remaining portion of MS 311 was paved.

== Major intersections ==
The entire route is in Marshall County.

Location	mi	km	Destinations	Notes
Holly Springs	0.000	0.000	MS 7 (N Memphis Street) – Abbeville, Grand Junction	Southern terminus
Mount Pleasant	12.960	20.857	US 72 – Corinth, Memphis	Northern terminus
1.000 mi = 1.609 km; 1.000 km = 0.621 mi

== See also ==
- List of state highways in Mississippi
