= Hudsonville, Mississippi =

- Unincorporated community
- Location within Mississippi Location within the United States
- Coordinates: 34°51′40″N 89°22′30″W
- Country: United States
- State: Mississippi
- County: Marshall
- Elevation: 492 ft (150 m)
- Time zone: UTC-6 (Central (CST))
  - Summer (DST): UTC-5 (CDT)
- Area code: 662
- GNIS feature ID: 693551

Hudsonville, (also known as Scales Station), is an unincorporated community in Marshall County, Mississippi, United States. It is located in the hill country of north Mississippi.

== History ==
Hudsonville was located along the "Wet Weather Trail", a Chickasaw trail that followed a series of ridges between present-day Pontotoc and Memphis.

The original community of Hudsonville was northwest of the current community and was located along the stage road between Holly Springs and LaGrange, Tennessee. After the construction of the Mississippi Central Railroad, the community moved two miles to the southeast and the original site became known as "Old Hudsonville." In 1900, Hudsonville had a population of 43, a cotton gin, and several stores.

Hudsonville was incorporated on February 16, 1838.

A post office operated under the name Hudsonville from 1836 to 1943.

== Notable people ==
- Elias Cottrell, 7th Bishop of the Christian Methodist Episcopal Church and founder of the Mississippi Industrial College in Holly Springs
- Junior Kimbrough, blues musician
- Sam Lumpkin, 21st Lieutenant Governor of Mississippi
