= Taska, Mississippi =

Unincorporated community in Mississippi, US

Coordinates: 34°55′08″N 89°33′55″W

Taska is an unincorporated community in Marshall County, in the U.S. state of Mississippi.

== History ==
The community was named after Taska Davis, the sister of an early settler. A post office called Taska was established in 1899, and remained in operation until 1925.
