= Slayden, Mississippi =

- Unincorporated community
- Location within Mississippi Location within the United States
- Coordinates: 34°56′49″N 89°26′27″W
- Country: United States
- State: Mississippi
- County: Marshall
- Elevation: 571 ft (174 m)
- Time zone: UTC-6 (Central (CST))
  - Summer (DST): UTC-5 (CDT)
- GNIS feature ID: 677877

Slayden is an unincorporated community in Marshall County, Mississippi, United States. It is located along U.S. Route 72 in northeast Marshall County, about 35 miles from Memphis, Tennessee.

== History ==
The community was settled in the 1860s and was originally known as "Gourd Neck", then "Slayden's Crossing". A post office operated in Slayden from 1875 to 1909. Slayden was named for Everett Daniel Slayden. The population in 1900 was 26.

In 1935, Ab Young, a black tenant farmer, was lynched in Slayden by a group of 50 white men. Young had allegedly murdered a white man. Although members of the mob had provided their names and addresses to two reporters from the Memphis Press-Scimitar, the authorities took no action because they claimed they had no clues to the identify of the killers.

== See also ==
- Memphis Metropolitan Area
