= Marshall County, Mississippi =

County in Mississippi, United States

- County
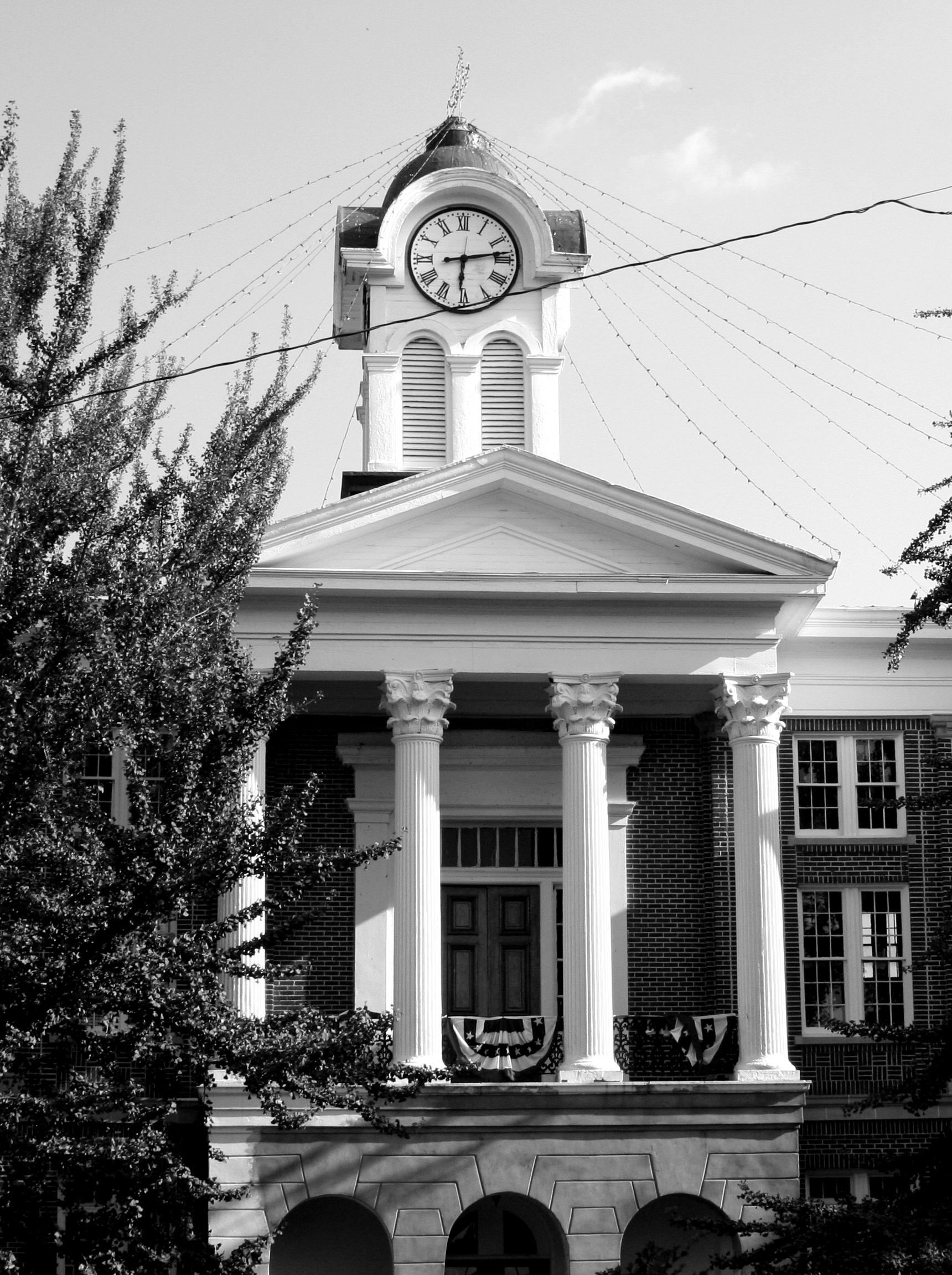
- The Marshall County Courthouse in Holly Springs

- Location within the U.S. state of Mississippi
- Coordinates: 34°46′N 89°31′W
- Country: United States
- State: Mississippi
- Founded: 1836
- Named for: John Marshall
- Seat: Holly Springs
- Largest city: Holly Springs

Area
  - Total: 710 sq mi (1,800 km^{2})
  - Land: 706 sq mi (1,830 km^{2})
  - Water: 3.6 sq mi (9.3 km^{2}) 0.5%

Population (2020)
  - Total: 33,752
  - Estimate (2025): 34,654 ▲
  - Density: 47.8/sq mi (18.5/km^{2})
- Time zone: UTC−6 (Central)
  - Summer (DST): UTC−5 (CDT)
- Congressional district: 1st
- Website: www.marshall-county.com

Marshall County is a county located on the north central border of the U.S. state of Mississippi. As of the 2020 census, the population was 33,752. Its county seat is Holly Springs. The county is named for Chief Justice of the United States John Marshall, who presided in the early nineteenth century. Marshall County is part of the Memphis, TN-MS-AR Metropolitan Statistical Area.

== Geography ==
According to the U.S. Census Bureau, the county has a total area of 710 square miles (1,800 km^{2}), of which 706 square miles (1,830 km^{2}) is land and 3.6 square miles (9.3 km^{2}) (0.5%) is water.

=== Major highways ===
- Interstate 22
- Interstate 269
- U.S. Route 72
- U.S. Route 78
- Mississippi Highway 4
- Mississippi Highway 7
- Mississippi Highway 178
- Mississippi Highway 302
- Mississippi Highway 309
- Mississippi Highway 310
- Mississippi Highway 311
- Mississippi Highway 349

=== Adjacent counties ===
- Fayette County, Tennessee (north)
- Benton County (east)
- Union County (southeast)
- Lafayette County (south)
- Tate County (southwest)
- DeSoto County (west)
- Shelby County, Tennessee (northwest)

=== National protected area ===
- Holly Springs National Forest (part)

== Demographics ==
Historical population
Census	Pop.	Note	%±
1840	17,526		—
1850	29,689		69.4%
1860	28,823		−2.9%
1870	29,416		2.1%
1880	29,330		−0.3%
1890	26,043		−11.2%
1900	27,674		6.3%
1910	26,796		−3.2%
1920	26,105		−2.6%
1930	24,869		−4.7%
1940	25,522		2.6%
1950	25,106		−1.6%
1960	24,503		−2.4%
1970	24,027		−1.9%
1980	29,296		21.9%
1990	30,361		3.6%
2000	34,993		15.3%
2010	37,144		6.1%
2020	33,752		−9.1%
2025 (est.)	34,654	▲	2.7%
U.S. Decennial Census; 1790-1960 1900-1990; 1990-2000 2010-2013

=== Racial and ethnic composition ===
Marshall County, Mississippi – Racial and ethnic composition Note: the US Census treats Hispanic/Latino as an ethnic category. This table excludes Latinos from the racial categories and assigns them to a separate category. Hispanics/Latinos may be of any race.
Race / Ethnicity (NH = Non-Hispanic)	Pop 1980	Pop 1990	Pop 2000	Pop 2010	Pop 2020	% 1980	% 1990	% 2000	% 2010	% 2020
White alone (NH)	13,583	14,797	16,774	18,161	16,284	46.36%	48.74%	47.94%	48.89%	48.25%
Black or African American alone (NH)	15,421	15,331	17,496	17,369	14,880	52.64%	50.50%	50.00%	46.76%	44.09%
Native American or Alaska Native alone (NH)	13	59	54	67	55	0.04%	0.19%	0.15%	0.18%	0.16%
Asian alone (NH)	28	36	38	74	74	0.10%	0.12%	0.11%	0.20%	0.22%
Native Hawaiian or Pacific Islander alone (NH)	x	x	5	6	20	x	x	0.01%	0.02%	0.06%
Other race alone (NH)	25	5	5	24	67	0.09%	0.02%	0.01%	0.06%	0.20%
Mixed race or Multiracial (NH)	x	x	196	251	832	x	x	0.56%	0.68%	2.47%
Hispanic or Latino (any race)	226	133	425	1,192	1,540	0.77%	0.44%	1.21%	3.21%	4.56%
Total	29,296	30,361	34,993	37,144	33,752	100.00%	100.00%	100.00%	100.00%	100.00%

=== 2020 census ===
As of the 2020 census, the county had a population of 33,752. The median age was 43.5 years. 19.5% of residents were under the age of 18 and 19.2% of residents were 65 years of age or older. For every 100 females there were 98.9 males, and for every 100 females age 18 and over there were 98.2 males age 18 and over.

The racial makeup of the county was 48.9% White, 44.2% Black or African American, 0.3% American Indian and Alaska Native, 0.2% Asian, 0.1% Native Hawaiian and Pacific Islander, 3.2% from some other race, and 3.2% from two or more races. Hispanic or Latino residents of any race comprised 4.6% of the population.

16.5% of residents lived in urban areas, while 83.5% lived in rural areas.

There were 12,631 households in the county, of which 28.5% had children under the age of 18 living in them. Of all households, 42.2% were married-couple households, 19.2% were households with a male householder and no spouse or partner present, and 32.7% were households with a female householder and no spouse or partner present. About 27.5% of all households were made up of individuals and 12.4% had someone living alone who was 65 years of age or older.

There were 14,990 housing units, of which 15.7% were vacant. Among occupied housing units, 77.1% were owner-occupied and 22.9% were renter-occupied. The homeowner vacancy rate was 0.6% and the rental vacancy rate was 36.6%.

=== 2010 census ===
As of the 2010 United States census, there were 37,144 people living in the county. 50.1% were White, 46.9% Black or African American, 0.2% Native American, 0.2% Asian, 1.7% of some other race and 0.8% of two or more races. 3.2% were Hispanic or Latino (of any race).

=== 2000 census ===
At the 2000 census, there were 34,993 people, 12,163 households and 9,110 families living in the county. The population density was 50 inhabitants per square mile (19/km^{2}). There were 13,252 housing units at an average density of 19 per square mile (7.3/km^{2}). The racial makeup of the county was 50.36% Black or African American, 48.37% White, 0.17% Native American, 0.11% Asian, 0.01% Pacific Islander, 0.37% from other races, and 0.62% from two or more races. 1.21% of the population were Hispanic or Latino of any race.

According to the census of 2000, the largest ancestry groups in Marshall County were African 50.36%, English 31.87%, Scottish 7.1%, Scots-Irish 3.13%, Irish 1.2% and Welsh 1.1%

There were 12,163 households, of which 34.30% had children under the age of 18 living with them, 49.60% were married couples living together, 20.10% had a female householder with no husband present, and 25.10% were non-families. 22.00% of all households were made up of individuals, and 7.90% had someone living alone who was 65 years of age or older. The average household size was 2.74 and the average family size was 3.19.

Age distribution was 26.60% under the age of 18, 11.80% from 18 to 24, 28.60% from 25 to 44, 22.00% from 45 to 64, and 11.10% who were 65 years of age or older. The median age was 34 years. For every 100 females there were 98.00 males. For every 100 females age 18 and over, there were 96.50 males.

The median household income was $28,756, and the median family income was $33,125. Males had a median income of $28,852 versus $21,227 for females. The per capita income for the county was $14,028. About 18.00% of families and 21.90% of the population were below the poverty line, including 28.70% of those under age 18 and 23.10% of those age 65 or over.

== Communities ==
=== City ===
- Holly Springs (county seat and largest municipality)

=== Towns ===
- Byhalia
- Potts Camp

=== Census-designated places ===
- Bethlehem
- Mount Pleasant
- Red Banks
- Victoria
- Waterford

=== Unincorporated communities ===
- Barton
- Blackwater (partially located in Lafayette County)
- Cayce
- Chulahoma
- Early Grove
- Hudsonville
- Mahon
- Slayden

== Politics ==
Democratic presidential candidates carried the county in every election since 1976, until the 2024 election, when it was won by Republican Donald Trump. Democratic vote share in the county has fallen as the county's Black share of the population has declined.

The smallest percentage margin was in 2020, when Joe Biden won the county by 3.1% over incumbent Donald Trump.

United States presidential election results for Marshall County, Mississippi
Year	Republican		Democratic		Third party(ies)	
Year	No.	%	No.	%	No.	%
1912	9	1.08%	779	93.18%	48	5.74%
1916	8	0.78%	1,017	99.12%	1	0.10%
1920	30	3.50%	823	96.14%	3	0.35%
1924	40	3.38%	1,142	96.62%	0	0.00%
1928	100	6.57%	1,422	93.43%	0	0.00%
1932	38	2.88%	1,281	97.05%	1	0.08%
1936	22	1.94%	1,111	97.97%	1	0.09%
1940	48	3.31%	1,403	96.69%	0	0.00%
1944	63	4.19%	1,441	95.81%	0	0.00%
1948	29	2.08%	152	10.88%	1,216	87.04%
1952	604	24.64%	1,847	75.36%	0	0.00%
1956	287	16.94%	1,192	70.37%	215	12.69%
1960	404	22.63%	681	38.15%	700	39.22%
1964	2,251	86.78%	343	13.22%	0	0.00%
1968	577	9.19%	2,907	46.30%	2,794	44.50%
1972	3,326	62.10%	1,875	35.01%	155	2.89%
1976	2,242	24.30%	6,769	73.37%	215	2.33%
1980	3,455	31.85%	7,153	65.94%	240	2.21%
1984	4,389	42.70%	5,845	56.87%	44	0.43%
1988	4,668	39.72%	6,982	59.42%	101	0.86%
1992	3,847	30.75%	7,913	63.24%	752	6.01%
1996	3,272	28.85%	7,521	66.32%	547	4.82%
2000	4,723	37.51%	7,735	61.43%	134	1.06%
2004	5,975	40.79%	8,591	58.65%	83	0.57%
2008	6,683	40.56%	9,685	58.78%	110	0.67%
2012	6,473	39.86%	9,650	59.42%	117	0.72%
2016	6,587	44.39%	8,023	54.07%	229	1.54%
2020	7,566	47.83%	8,057	50.94%	194	1.23%
2024	7,977	53.24%	6,888	45.97%	118	0.79%

== See also ==
- Marshall County School District
- National Register of Historic Places listings in Marshall County, Mississippi
