= Mississippi Highway 328 =

Highway in Mississippi

Mississippi Highway 328

Route information
- Maintained by MDOT
- Length: 12.847 mi (20.675 km)
- Existed: 1957–present

Major junctions
- West end: MS 315 near Water Valley
- East end: MS 7 near Markette

Location
- Country: United States
- State: Mississippi
- Counties: Lafayette

Highway system
- Mississippi State Highway System; Interstate; US; State
← MS 322	→ MS 330

Mississippi Highway 328 (MS 328) is an east-west state highway located entirely in the Yocona River valley of the North Central Hills in northern Mississippi, connecting MS 315 to Markette at MS 7.

The entire highway is located in Lafayette County. The state highway serves the town of Taylor (via MS 733, a.k.a. Main Street).

== Route description ==
MS 328 begins a few miles northwest of Water Valley at an intersection with MS 315 at the eastern end of Enid Lake. It winds its way northeast through hilly woodlands for a couple miles before traveling due east as it enters the Yocona River Valley. The highway travels along the northern banks of the river as it passes through farmland for several miles, where it makes a sharp left turn at an intersection with Marshall County Road 387 (CR 387, provides direct access to the town of Water Valley). MS 328 now also becomes known as Cotton Road as it travels along the southern edge of the town of Taylor, with access to the town provided via MS 733 (Main Street) and Cutoff Road. MS 328 comes to an end shortly thereafter at an intersection with MS 7 just a couple miles south of Oxford, directly across the river from that highway's intersection with MS 9W.

The entire length of Mississippi Highway 328 is a rural, two-lane, state highway.

== Major intersections ==
The entire route is in Lafayette County.

Location	mi	km	Destinations	Notes
	0.000	0.000	MS 315 – Batesville, Sardis Lake, Water Valley	Western terminus
Taylor	8.374	13.477	MS 733 north (Main Street) – Taylor	Southern terminus of MS 733
	12.847	20.675	MS 7 – Grenada, Water Valley, Oxford	Eastern terminus
1.000 mi = 1.609 km; 1.000 km = 0.621 mi
