= Henry Rose Carter =

American epidemiologist (1852–1925)

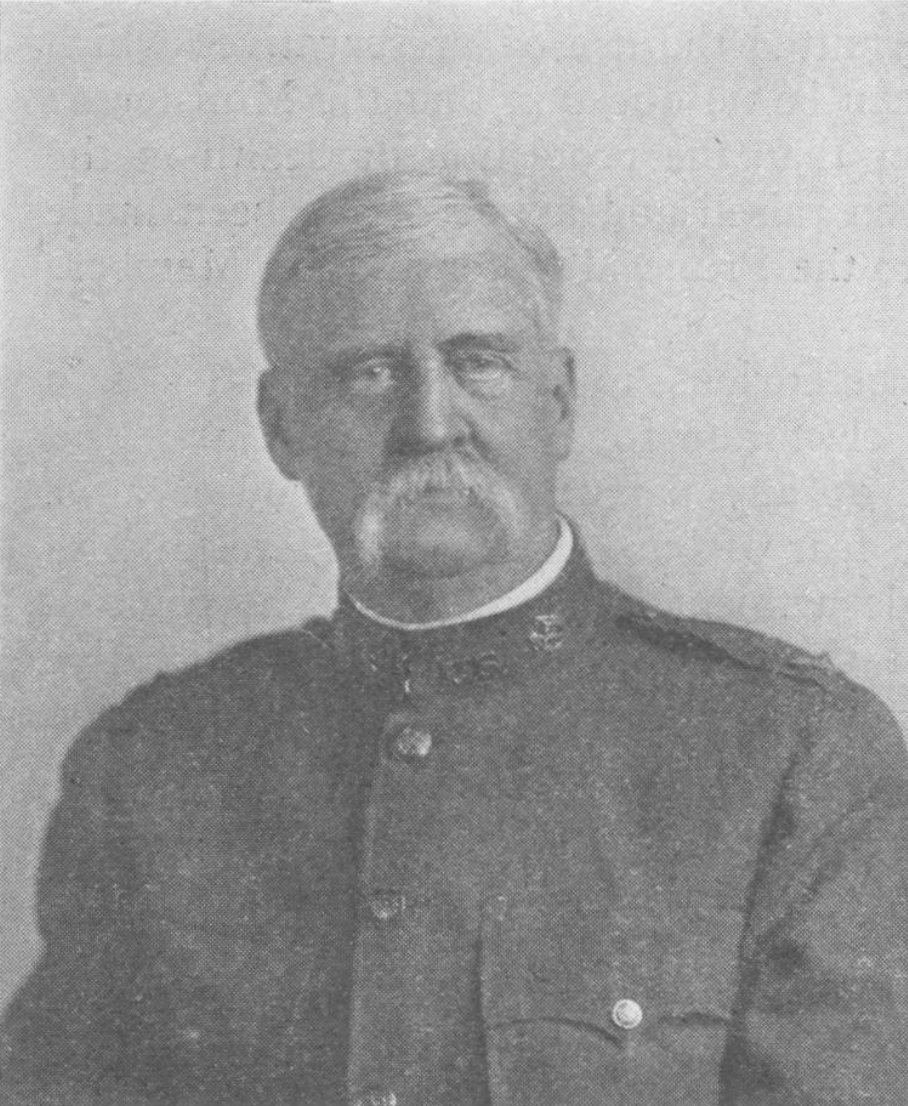
Henry Rose Carter

Henry Rose Carter (August 25, 1852 – September 14, 1925) was an American physician, epidemiologist, and public health official who served as assistant surgeon general of the Public Health Service Commissioned Corps. His research and protocols were critical in understanding and preventing the transmission of both malaria and yellow fever.

Carter was born in Virginia in 1852. After attending the University of Virginia and the University of Maryland medical school, he joined the Marine Hospital Service (MHS). He was stationed at various MHS hospitals across the South, where he became interested in yellow fever. In 1888, he was dispatched to Mississippi's Ship Island, where he spent a decade developing novel quarantine methods.

In a 1898 study conducted in Mississippi, Carter discovered the extrinsic incubation period of yellow fever. This work implied the role of a secondary host, soon identified as the mosquito by U.S. Army physician Walter Reed. Carter served as director of hospitals in the Panama Canal Zone from 1904 to 1909. In 1915, he was appointed to assistant surgeon general by Congress. Carter retired in 1920 and died five years later.

With Reed and Carlos Finlay, Carter is regarded as one of the three researchers who helped identify yellow fever as mosquito-borne. Alongside Finlay, Carter was nominated for the 1904 Nobel Prize in Medicine for their work identifying the mosquito vector of yellow fever. Carter is also considered the father of modern quarantine.

== Biography ==
=== Early life and quarantine work ===
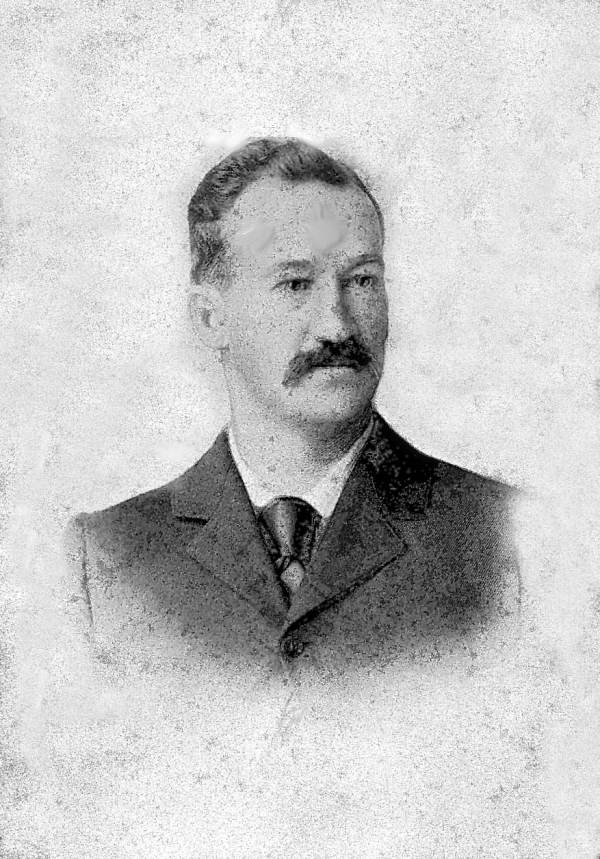
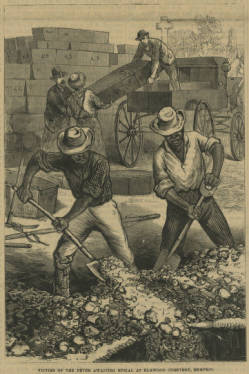
A portrait of Carter c. 1870 (left), and the burial of yellow fever victims in Memphis, Tennessee, 1878 (right)

Henry Rose Carter was born on August 25, 1852, at Clinton Plantation in Caroline County, Virginia. As a youth, he was shot in the leg during a skirmish between Union and Confederate sympathizers. He studied civil engineering at the University of Virginia before attending medical school at the University of Maryland, graduating in 1879. Carter joined the Marine Hospital Service (MHS), now the United States Public Health Service. Amid a severe outbreak of yellow fever in the lower Mississippi Valley, Carter was immediately dispatched to Memphis, Tennessee. Over the following 9 years, he was stationed in MHS hospitals across the South and became fascinated by yellow fever.

In 1888, Carter was positioned at Ship Island, which lies off the coast of Mississippi, as quarantine officer. For the following decade, Carter worked to analyze and refine U.S. quarantine procedures. He developed a method of ship disinfection: sulphur dioxide fumigation and deck washing with mercuric chloride. Carter also instituted the use of flowing, steaming water as a disinfectant. From sailors, he determined that the yellow fever incubation period was shorter than six days. He established a uniform seven day quarantine period for ships following disinfection. For ships from Cuba and Mexico, he encouraged the disinfection procedure be conducted en route to expedite the process. For these innovations, Carter is considered the father of modern quarantine. Despite his efforts, however, yellow fever outbreaks were still common across the American South.

=== Yellow fever incubation study ===
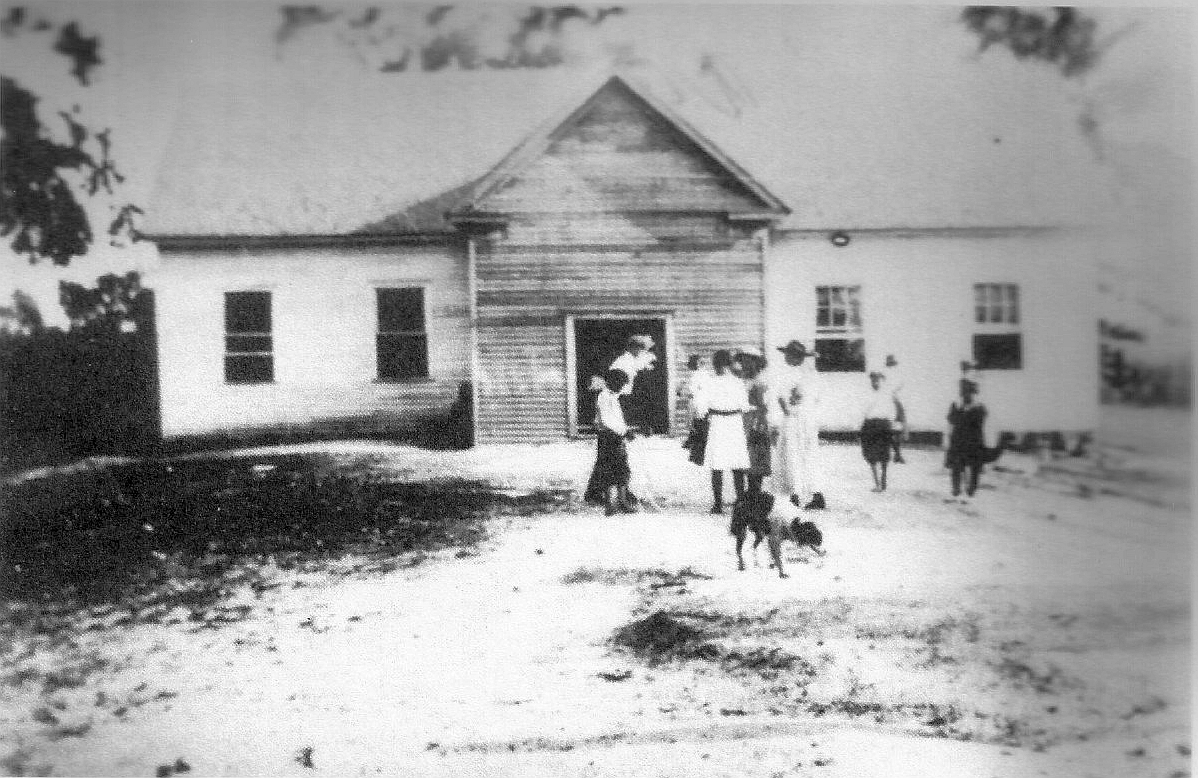
A schoolhouse in rural Orwood, Mississippi, early 20th century

In summer 1898, Carter traveled to a yellow fever outbreak in two remote Mississippi towns: Orwood and Taylor. The location attracted Carter as the residents lived in isolated farmhouses, allowing him to more easily deduce when transmission occurred. Carter observed 12 households, carefully recording the dates of incident cases, secondary cases, and visits by neighbors. Curiously, Carter found that visitors to a recent infection never fell ill, but those who visited after two weeks usually acquired yellow fever. Carter concluded that the period between the initial and secondary infections comprised:

1. Time of first infection to when environment is capable of transmitting disease to secondary person
2. Time in environment until second person is infected
3. Time until secondary infection displays symptoms

Cumulatively, he termed this the "period of extrinsic incubation. Carter had seen a similar timeline with infections aboard ships when serving as quarantine officer. This "environmental incubation" suggested the existence of an intermediate host.

In 1899, Carter was assigned to Havana, Cuba by the MHS as Chief Quarantine Officer. There, he discussed his Mississippi findings with researchers Carlos Finlay and Walter Reed. In his 1900 paper identifying the Aedes aegypti mosquito as the yellow fever vector, Reed cited Carter's work. Reed later told Carter that "your own work in Mississippi did more to impress me with the importance of an intermediate host in yellow fever than everything else put together."

In 1904, Sir Ronald Ross—a Nobel laureate due to his discovery that malaria was also spread via mosquitos—nominated Carter and Carlos Finlay for the 1904 Nobel Prize in Medicine for their work identifying the mosquito as the vector of yellow fever. The American Public Health Association deemed Carter's work "a brilliant piece of epidemiological study".

=== Panama Canal Zone and later life ===
[Carter's] name will always be linked with those who brought the final solution to the great problem of yellow fever control.

— The American Public Health Association, 1925

From 1904 to 1909, Carter served as the director of hospitals in the Panama Canal Zone. There, he managed efforts to eliminate both malaria and yellow fever. Carter wrote a series of seminal papers on the control and eradication of mosquito-borne diseases. Carter believed that, in public health efforts, it was essential to address the environmental conditions that allowed tropical diseases to thrive, rather than solely treating patients. At the time, he was regarded as the leading expert on malaria.

In 1915, a special act of Congress designated him as the assistant surgeon general of the U.S. Public Health Service. As a member of the Rockefeller Foundation's International Health Commission—which sought to eradicate yellow fever—he journeyed to South America in 1916. From 1917 to 1918, he oversaw the federal government's efforts to control malaria, particularly on US military bases. Carter retired from service in 1920. However, he briefly served as an advisor on sanitation for the Peruvian government from 1920 to 1921.

On September 14, 1925, Carter died in Washington, DC following a long illness. In an obituary, the American Public Health Association declared him "one of our brightest stars". A collection of his papers is held by the University of Virginia.

== See also ==
- Carlos Finlay
- William C. Gorgas
- Clara Maass
- Walter Reed
