= John Kyle =

John Kyle may refer to:

- John Joseph Jolly Kyle (1838–1922), Scottish-born Argentine chemist
- John C. Kyle (1851–1913), American politician from Mississippi
- John W. Kyle (1891–1965), American politician and jurist from Mississippi
  - John W. Kyle State Park in Mississippi, named after above
- Johnny Kyle (1898–1974), American NFL football player
- John Wilson Kyle (1926–2014), Northern Ireland rugby player, a/k/a Jack Kyle or Jackie Kyle
- John Kyle (Northern Ireland politician) (born 1951), Councillor on Belfast City Council

== See also ==
- John Kyl (1919–2002), American member of Congress
- Jon Kyl (1942–2026), American senator from Arizona, son of above
