= Mississippi Highway 315 =

Highway in Mississippi

Mississippi Highway 315
- MS 315 in red, MS 315 Scenic in blue

Route information
- Length: 80.354 mi (129.317 km) 78.174 miles (125.809 km) excluding concurrencies
- Existed: 1953–present

Section 1
- Length: 31.129 mi (50.097 km)
- South end: MS 9W in Paris
- Major intersections: MS 7 / MS 32 near Water Valley
- North end: US 278 / MS 6 near Batesville

Section 2
- Length: 49.225 mi (79.220 km)
- South end: US 278 / MS 6 near Batesville
- Major intersections: I-55 in Sardis; US 51 in Sardis; MS 3 in Sledge
- North end: US 49 / US 61 near Rich

Location
- Country: United States
- State: Mississippi
- Counties: Lafayette, Yalobusha, Panola, Quitman, Coahoma

Highway system
- Mississippi State Highway System; Interstate; US; State
← MS 314	→ MS 316

Mississippi Highway 315 (MS 315) is an 80.4-mile-long (129.4 km) state highway located in northern Mississippi. The highway consists of two segments, one from MS 9W near Paris in Lafayette County to U.S. Route 278 (US 278) and MS 6 in Panola County, and another from US 278/MS 6 in Panola County to US 49/US 61 near Rich in Coahoma County. Along the way, the highway passes over Sardis Dam east of the town of Sardis. Though the two segments of MS 315 are signed north and south, they generally run in an east to westerly direction.

In addition, a signed scenic route, Mississippi Highway 315 Scenic, runs from Batesville to Sardis by way of Sardis Dam.

== Route description ==
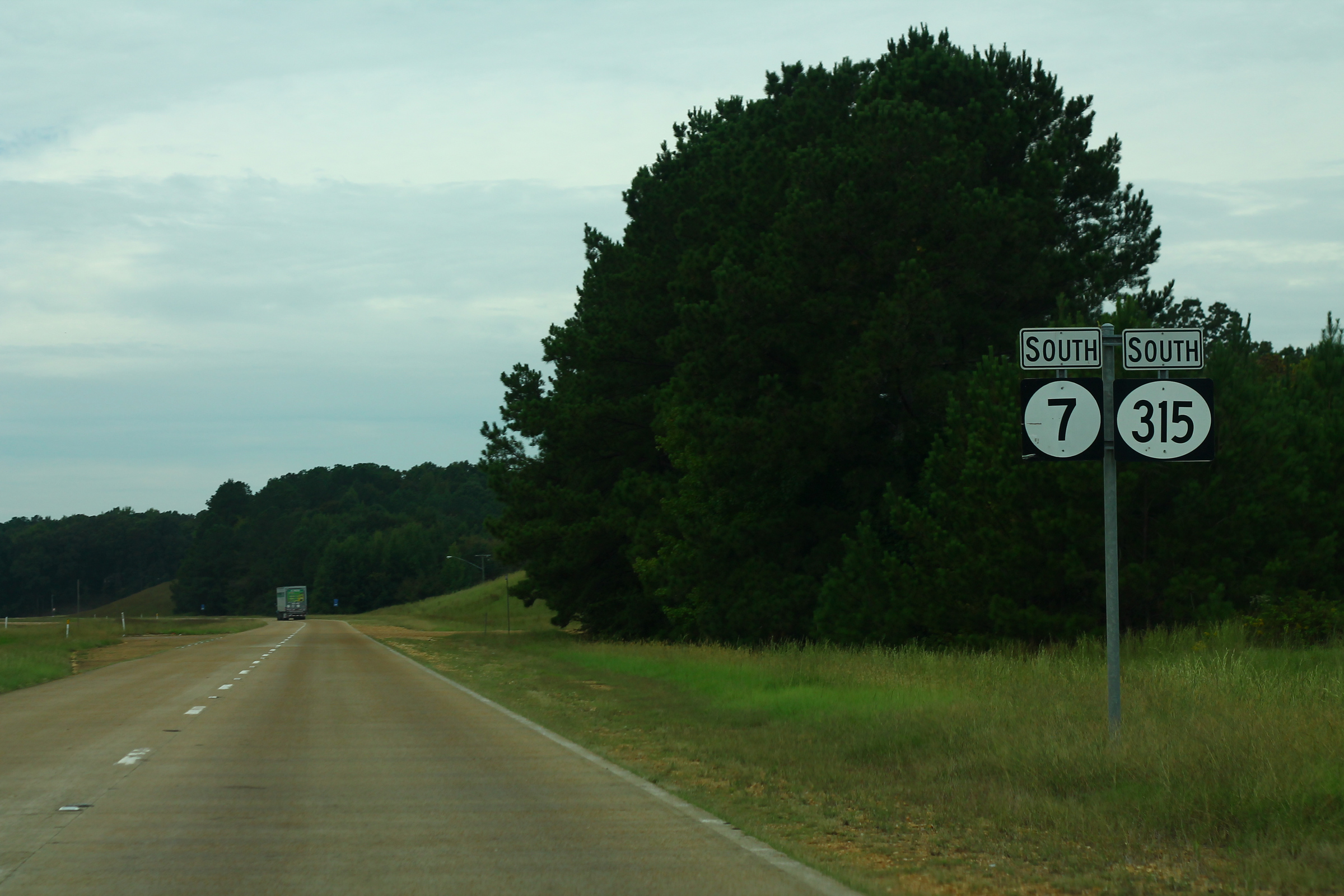
MS 7/MS 315 concurrency in Water Valley

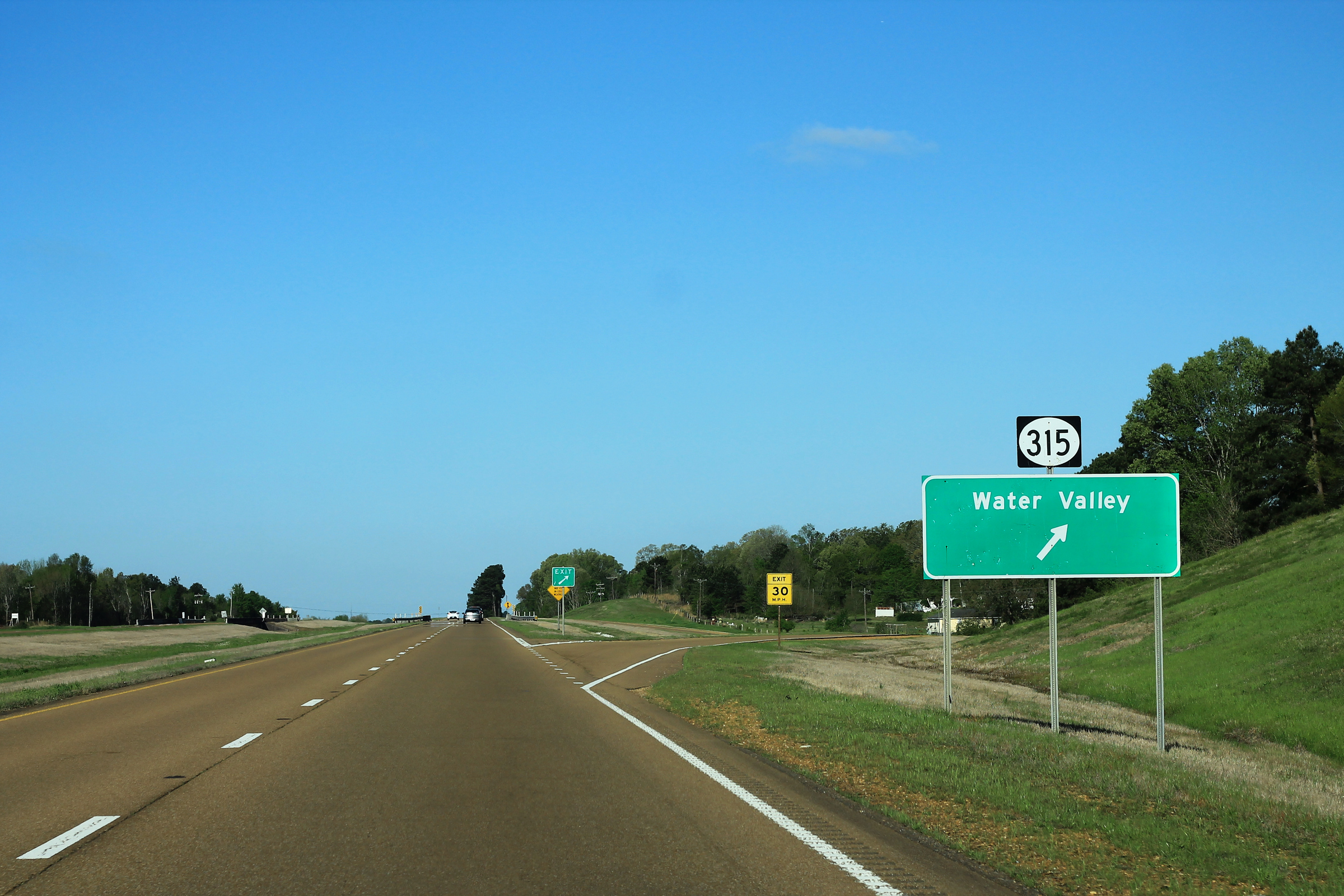
MS 6/US 278 at their interchange with MS 315 in Panola County

MS 315 begins at MS 9W and County Route 428 (CR 428) near the community of Paris in Lafayette County. The highway heads west (signed north) through a mix of woods and farmlands. It enters Yalobusha where it parallels the banks of Otoucalofa Creek. As the road approaches the city of Water Valley, the name of the road becomes Blackmur Drive as it heads through a residential neighborhood descending in elevation. In the downtown area, MS 315 turns onto Main Street to head south out of center of the city. It reaches MS 32 forming a brief concurrency to the west. MS 315 then reaches MS 7, a divided highway just outside the city limits. MS 315 heads north along MS 7, then curving to the northeast, briefly entering the city limits again, before MS 315 breaks off the concurrency from MS 7 to head northwest out of Yalobusha County. First, it reenters Lafayette County where it crosses the Yocona River and Enid Lake on a through truss bridge, then has an intersection with MS 328. Afterwards, MS 315 heads northwest and then north through woodlands in Panola County. MS 315 reaches a diamond interchange with US 278/MS 6 in a rural section of the county. The state highway officially continues past the interchange to end about 300 feet (91 m) past the interchange at John Branch Road and Marshall Road.

The northern segment of MS 315 begins at an intersection with US 278/MS 6 about 2.6 miles (4.2 km) east of the US 278/MS 6 interchange near the northern terminus of the other MS 315 segment. At this point, the state highway is not signed nor is it maintained by the state. The road heads north through a mostly wooded area until it reaches the Sardis Dam within John W. Kyle State Park. After following the top of the dam for about 0.2 miles (0.32 km), MS 315 reaches an intersection with MS 315 Scenic. The two highways form a concurrency to head down the downslope of the dam. At the bottom of the hill, MS 315 reaches an intersection with MS 35's northern terminus. MS 315 Scenic heads south along MS 35 whereas MS 315 continues northwest along the toe of the dam. After passing the dam, MS 315 reaches a second intersection with MS 315 Scenic. The two roads wind their way northwest through a wooded area before reaching the town limits of Sardis. In the eastern reaches of the town, MS 315 interchanges Interstate 55 (I-55) at its exit 252. At this interchange, MS 315 Scenic ends. Continuing west through town on Lee Street, it passes through the downtown area and then has an intersection with US 51.

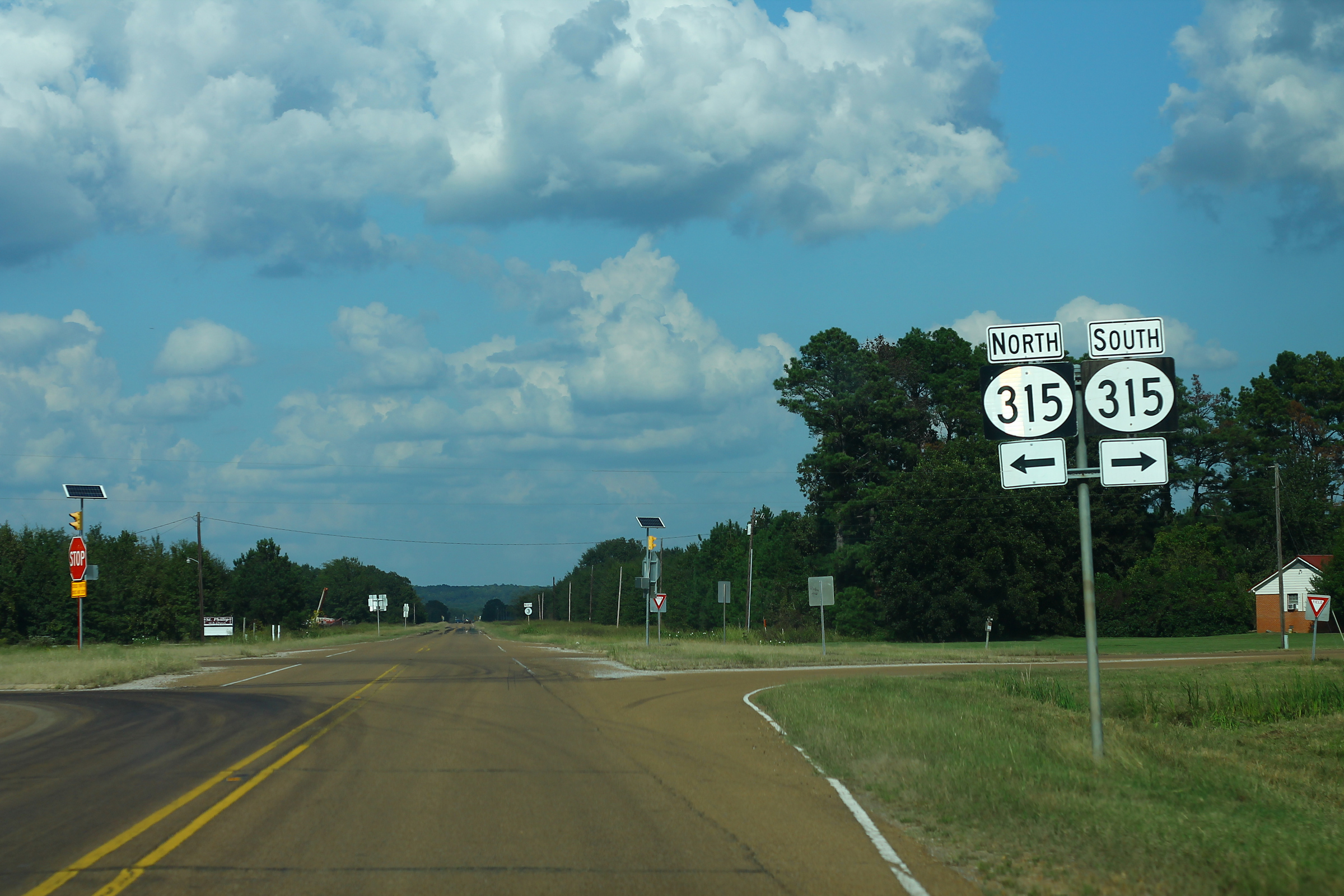
Mississippi Highway 3 northbound at its intersection with Mississippi Highway 315 in the town of Sledge, Located in the Mississippi Delta

As the road heads west through wooded areas, MS 315 exits the North Central Hills region of the state by descending Loess bluffs into the flatter farmland landscapes of the Mississippi Delta region. At an intersection with MS 3 within Quitman County, MS 315 forms the northern border of the town of Sledge. The highway crosses Tallahatchie River before curving to the south at MS 716 (Six Mile Lake Road). The road passes through the unincorporated community of Birdie before entering Coahoma County and curving to the northwest. After passing to the north of the community of Rich, MS 315 ends at an intersection with US 49/US 61.

The entire route of MS 315, excluding the concurrency with MS 7 (which is divided four-lane highway), as well as a short undivided four-lane section between US 51 and I-55 in Sardis, is a rural two-lane.

== Major intersections ==
County	Location	mi	km	Destinations	Notes
Lafayette	Paris	0.000	0.000	MS 9W / MS 812 east / CR 428 – Oxford, Bruce, Paris	Southern terminus; western terminus of MS 812
Yalobusha	Water Valley	12.259	19.729	MS 32 east (South Main Street) – Bruce	Southern end of MS 32 concurrency
Yalobusha		12.823	20.637	MS 7 south / MS 32 west – Oakland, Coffeeville	Northern end of MS 32 concurrency; southern end of MS 7 concurrency
Yalobusha	Water Valley	15.603	25.111	MS 7 north – Oxford, Water Valley	Northern end of MS 7 concurrency
Lafayette		20.876	33.597	MS 328 east	Western terminus of MS 328
Panola		30.911– 31.098	49.746– 50.047	US 278 / MS 6 – Batesville, Oxford	Interchange
Panola		31.129	50.097	John Branch Road / Marshall Road	Northern end of southern segment
Panola	Gap in route				
Panola		31.129	50.097	US 278 / MS 6 / Shady Grove Road	Southern end of southern segment
Panola	John W. Kyle State Park	36.390	58.564	MS 315 Scenic north	Southern end of MS 315 concurrency
Panola	John W. Kyle State Park	36.676	59.024	MS 35 south / MS 315 Scenic south – Cypress Point	Northern terminus of MS 35; northern end of MS 315 concurrency
Panola	John W. Kyle State Park	38.782	62.414	MS 315 Scenic south	Southern end of MS 315 concurrency
Panola	Sardis	45.026– 45.134	72.462– 72.636	I-55 / MS 315 Scenic ends – Grenada, Memphis	Exit 252 (I-55), northern terminus of MS 315 Scenic
Panola	Sardis	46.634	75.050	US 51 – Batesville, Senatobia	
Quitman	Sledge	63.683	102.488	MS 3 – Sledge, Marks, Crenshaw	
Quitman		67.366	108.415	MS 716 west (6 Mile Lake Road)	Eastern terminus of MS 716
Coahoma	Rich	80.354	129.317	US 49 / US 61 / Great River Road – Tunica, Clarksdale, Helena, AR	Northern terminus
1.000 mi = 1.609 km; 1.000 km = 0.621 mi: Concurrency terminus

== Scenic route ==
Mississippi Highway 315 Scenic
- Location: Batesville - Sardis
- Length: 17.394 mi (27.993 km)

Mississippi Highway 315 Scenic (MS 315 Scenic) is a 17.4-mile-long (28.0 km) scenic route of MS 315 in Panola County, Mississippi. It connects the towns of Batesville and Sardis with John W. Kyle State Park, as well as connecting MS 315 with Sardis Dam.

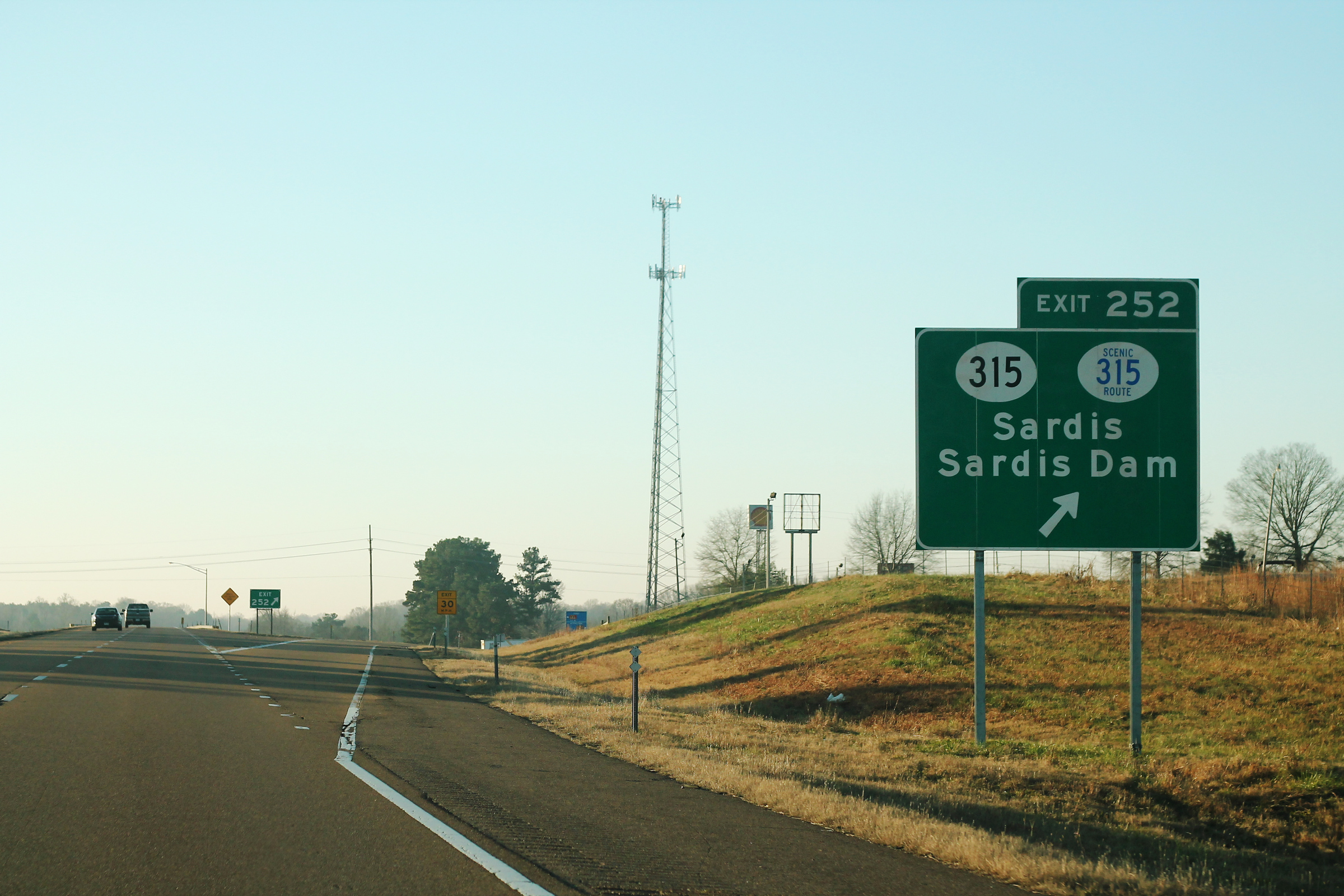
I-55 at its interchange with MS 315 and MS 315 Scenic (exit 252) in Sardis

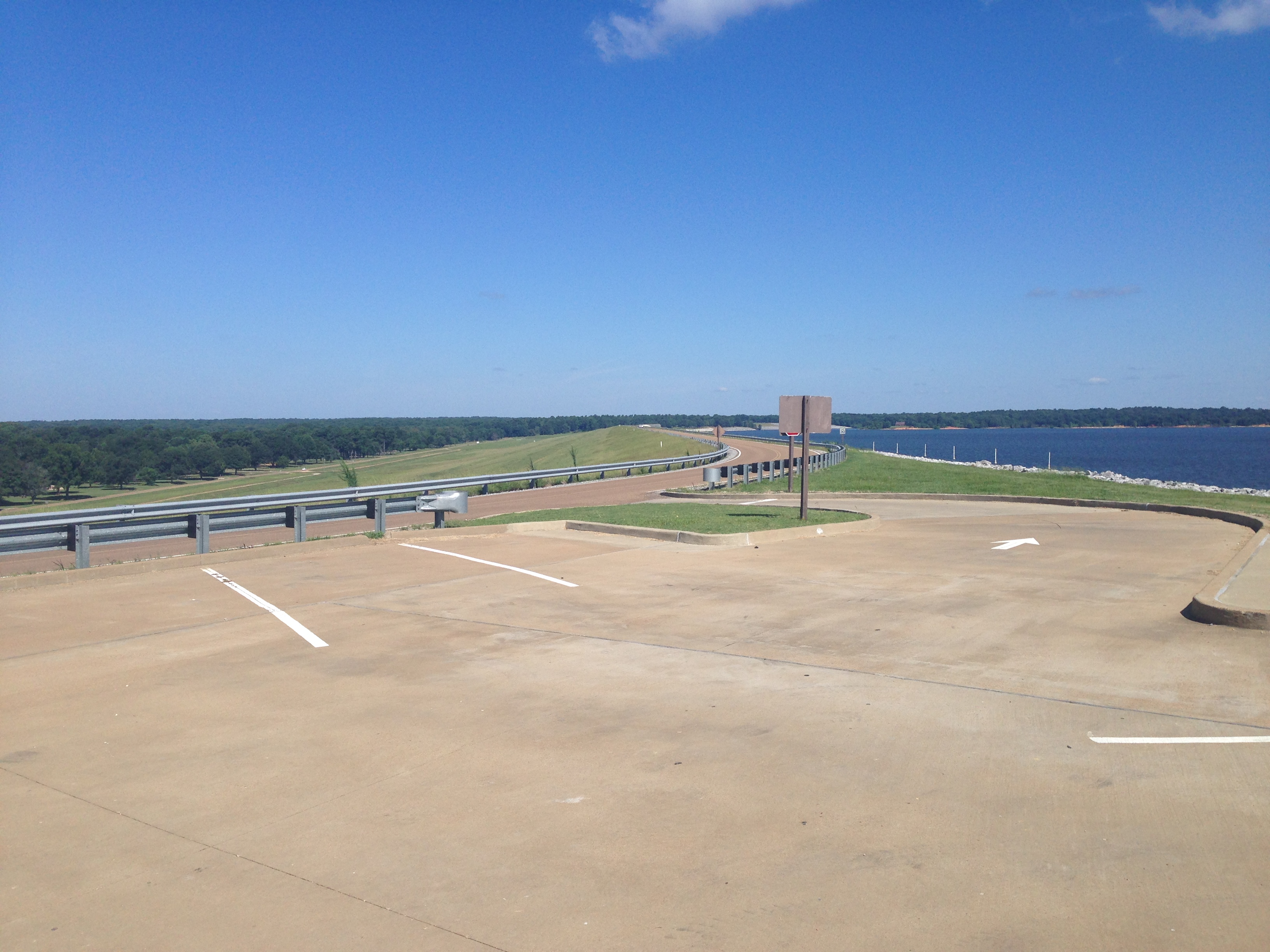
MS 315 Scenic crossing Sardis Dam, as viewed from Arty R. Tapp Overlook

MS 315 Scenic begins at an interchange between MS 35 and I-55 (the latter's exit 246) in the northern part of the city of Batesville. It heads west, concurrent (overlapped) with MS 35, where the highway leaves the Batesville city limits and passes by the Panola County Airport and crosses Hotopha Creek. MS 35/MS 315 Scenic heads northeast through farmland for several up a narrow valley to enter John W. Kyle State Park, where they travel along the southern shore of Lower Lake and pass by several businesses to come to an intersection with MS 315, where MS 35 ends and MS 315 Scenic follows MS 315 south to gain elevation as they climb towards the top of Sardis Dam. MS 315 Scenic now breaks off along its own path at another intersection and passes northwestward along the very top of Sardis Dam for a little over two miles, passing by the Arty R. Tapp Overlook, Beach Point Public Use Area, and the John W. Kyle State Park Lodge. MS 315 Scenic makes a sharp left turn at Spillway Road, which leads to the Mallard Pointe Golf Course and the Sardis Lake Field Office (as well as other portions of the state park), and winds its way down the side of the dam, parallel to its spillway, for about a mile to a wooded portion of the valley, where MS 315 Scenic comes to another intersection with MS 315. They become concurrent and wind their way west through hilly woodlands to leave the state park and enter the town of Sardis, where they come to another interchange with I-55 (exit 252), where MS 315 Scenic ends and mainline MS 315 continues west (signed north) into downtown.

The entire length of Mississippi Highway 315 Scenic is a two-lane highway.

The entire route is in Panola County.

Location	mi	km	Destinations	Notes
Batesville	0.000	0.000	I-55 / MS 35 south – Grenada, Memphis, Batesville	I-55 exit 246; southern end of MS 35 concurrency
John W. Kyle State Park	7.751	12.474	MS 315 north MS 35 ends	Northern terminus of MS 35; southern end of MS 315 concurrency
John W. Kyle State Park	8.037	12.934	MS 315 south – Oxford	Northern end of MS 315 concurrency
John W. Kyle State Park	11.042	17.770	MS 315 south – Lower Lake Recreation Area	Southern end of MS 315 concurrency
Sardis	17.286– 17.394	27.819– 27.993	I-55 – Grenada, Memphis MS 315 north (East Lee Street) – Sardis	I-55 exit 252; northern terminus
1.000 mi = 1.609 km; 1.000 km = 0.621 mi: Concurrency terminus
