= Black Sunday (1977 film) =

1977 film by John Frankenheimer

- Theatrical release poster
- Directed by: John Frankenheimer
- Screenplay by: Ernest Lehman; Kenneth Ross; Ivan Moffat
- Based on: Black Sunday by Thomas Harris
- Produced by: Robert Evans
- Starring: Robert Shaw; Bruce Dern; Marthe Keller; Fritz Weaver; Bekim Fehmiu
- Cinematography: John A. Alonzo
- Edited by: Tom Rolf
- Music by: John Williams
- Distributed by: Paramount Pictures
- Release date: April 1, 1977
- Running time: 143 minutes
- Country: United States
- Language: English
- Budget: $8 million
- Box office: $15.8 million

Black Sunday is a 1977 American action thriller film directed by John Frankenheimer and based on Thomas Harris's novel of the same name. It was produced by Robert Evans, and stars Robert Shaw, Bruce Dern and Marthe Keller. It was nominated for the Edgar Allan Poe Award in 1978. The screenplay was written by Ernest Lehman, Kenneth Ross and Ivan Moffat. Ross had previously written the screenplay for The Day of the Jackal, a similar plot-driven political thriller. The inspiration of the story came from the Munich massacre, perpetrated by the Black September organization against Israeli athletes at the 1972 Summer Olympics, giving the title for the novel and film.

== Plot ==
Michael Lander is a Goodyear Blimp pilot who flies over National Football League games for network television coverage. Secretly deranged by years of torture as a POW in the Vietnam War, he had a bitter court martial upon his return and a failed marriage. He longs to kill himself and to take with him as many as possible of the cheerful, carefree civilians he sees from his blimp each weekend.

Lander is desperately in love with Dahlia Iyad, an operative from the Palestinian terrorist group Black September, who controls and manipulates him. They conspire together to launch a suicide attack using a bomb composed of plastique and a quarter-million steel flechettes. They plan to mount the bomb on the underside of the gondola of the Goodyear blimp and detonate it over the Miami Orange Bowl during Super Bowl X, killing over 80,000 spectators, including the President of the United States, in order to call attention to the plight of the Palestinians and to punish the United States for supporting Israel.

During a raid on a Black September safehouse in Beirut, the Israeli counter-terrorist Mossad agent David Kabakov surprises Iyad while she is showering. His mission was to kill everyone in the unit; however, seeing her unarmed and naked, he spares her life and turns his attention to clearing the rest of the safehouse, and she escapes. When the raid is complete, Kabakov finds a recorded message which Iyad had planned to publish after the terrorist attack. The recording explains the motive for the terrorism, but does not include any specific information about the attack plan itself.

Collaborating with FBI agent Sam Corley, Kabakov and his partner Robert Moshevsky try to learn the details of the plan. Meanwhile, in Long Beach, Black September bribes freighter captain Tekiaki Ogawa to transport the plastic explosives, disguised as statuettes. Ogawa puts the explosives aboard Iyad and Lander's motorboat, but the two terrorists are discovered by the Coast Guard and forced to flee.

Ogawa is interrogated by Kabakov and Moshevsky, only for a bomb Lander had secretly planted to explode, killing Ogawa and hospitalizing Kabakov. Iyad disguises herself as a nurse to infiltrate the hospital and assassinate Kabakov, only for Moshevsky to discover her before she kills him and departs.

Kabakov questions Muzi, a local businessman and uses a contact in the Egyptian government named Riaf to discover her identity, and Corley tracks Iyad and her superior Mohammed Fasil to a hotel in Miami. They attempt to capture them, but Iyad retreats, while Fasil is killed by Kabakov in a shootout.

After searching Iyad's room, Kabakov realizes that they are targeting the Super Bowl. Corley and Kabakov form a security detail to search the crowd for any sign of suspicious activity. During the Super Bowl game, Kabakov figures out that Iyad and Lander have mounted the bomb on the Goodyear blimp. He and Corley commandeer a helicopter and set out in pursuit of the blimp, accompanied by a police helicopter.

Loaded with the bomb, the blimp approaches the stadium. Lander pilots the blimp while Iyad exchanges deadly gunfire with policemen in the pursuing cars and helicopters. From his place in one helicopter, Kabakov sees Iyad's face, and they both recognize each other from the Black September raid in Beirut, where he spared her life. This time, Iyad hesitates, but Kabakov does not and he shoots and kills her. Lander has been mortally wounded, but he lives long enough to succeed in flying the blimp straight into the Super Bowl, causing mass chaos and destruction in the stadium. Just before dying, with the electronic detonator destroyed, Lander lights the backup fuse of the weapon.

With the weapon just minutes away from detonation, Kabakov lowers himself from the helicopter to the blimp, and hooks it up with a cable to the helicopter, which hauls it out of the panicked stadium and over the ocean. Kabakov unhooks the cable from the blimp, and clings to the cable as the helicopter moves away to a safe distance. A few seconds later, the bomb detonates, destroying the blimp and firing the flechettes harmlessly into the sea.

== Cast ==
As appearing in Black Sunday (main roles and screen credits identified):

- Robert Shaw as Major David Kabakov
- Bruce Dern as Michael Lander
- Marthe Keller as Dahlia Iyad
- Fritz Weaver as Sam Corley
- Steven Keats as Robert Moshevsky
- Bekim Fehmiu as Mohammed Fasil
- Michael V. Gazzo as Muzi
- William Daniels as Harold Pugh
- Walter Gotell as Colonel Riat
- Victor Campos as Nageeb
- Joe Robbie as himself
- Robert Wussler as himself
- Pat Summerall as himself
- Tom Brookshier as himself
- Walter Brooke as Fowler
- James Jeter as Watchman
- Clyde Kusatsu as Captain Tekiaki Ogawa
- Tom McFadden as Farley
- Robert Patten as Vickers
- Than Wyenn as Israeli Ambassador

== Production ==
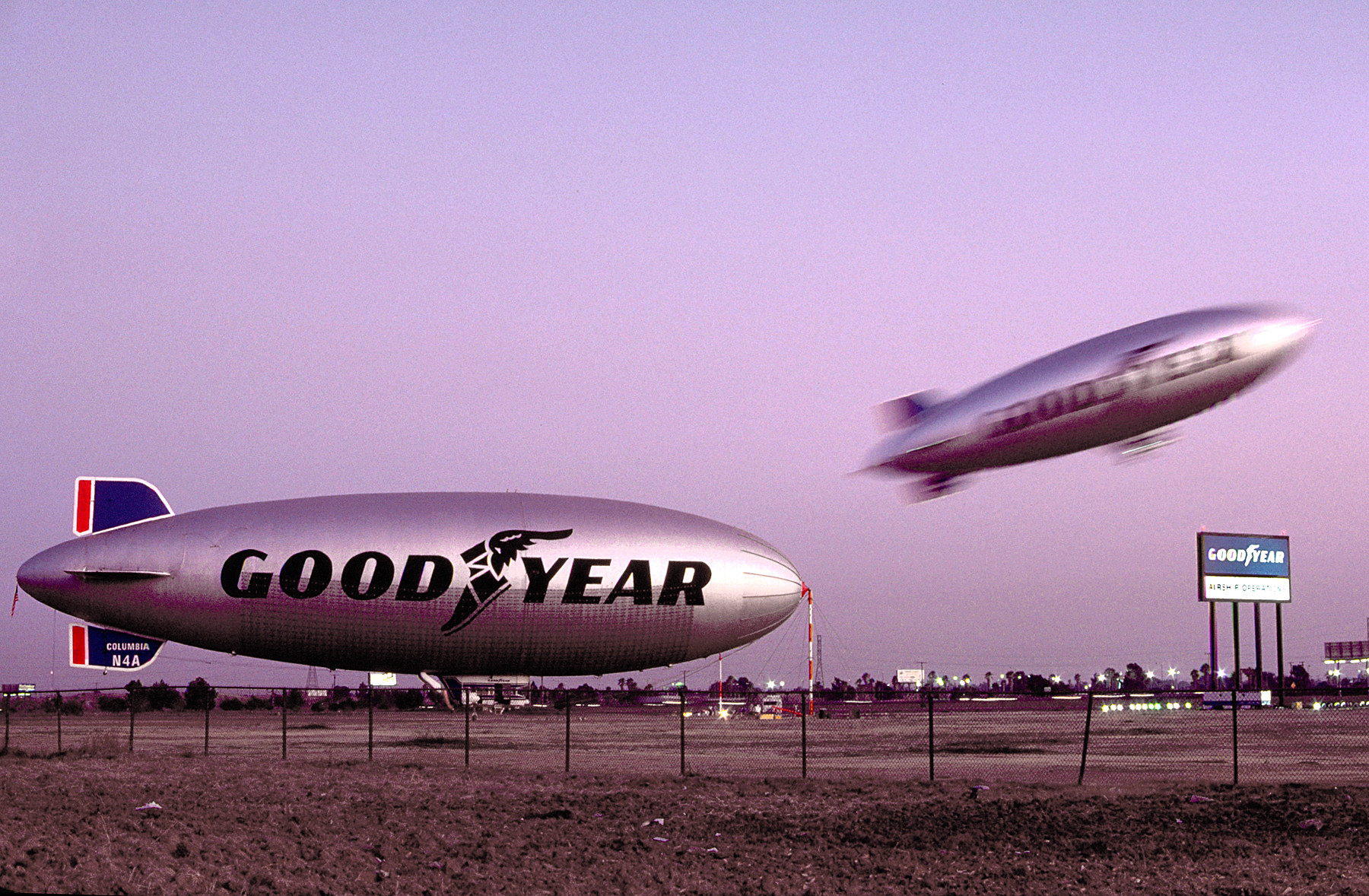
Goodyear Blimps Columbia and America, seen in 1984: Both blimps were separately used in the film.

The film was produced by former Paramount Pictures chief Robert Evans. He had earlier produced Chinatown (1974) and Marathon Man (1976). Director John Frankenheimer's frequent line producer Robert L. Rosen was credited as executive producer.

As the movie required filming a real Goodyear Blimp at a real Super Bowl, many challenges existed. Fortunately, Frankenheimer had a good relationship with Robert Lane of the Goodyear Tire and Rubber Company, as a result of previously working with Goodyear on his 1966 film Grand Prix. Lane told Frankenheimer, "You're the only person I've ever worked with who has kept his word." At that time, the only other large blimp in the world was based in Germany; Frankenheimer told Goodyear that if they declined the use of their blimps, he would rent the German blimp, paint it silver, and people would assume it was theirs anyway. Lane granted Frankenheimer use of Goodyear's blimps on three conditions: the film had to make clear that the villainous pilot did not work directly for Goodyear, but for a contractor; the final explosion could not emit from the name Goodyear on the blimp's sides; and the blimp itself could not directly be part of any violence (for example, nobody could be churned up in its propellers).

Evans helped secure the unprecedented cooperation of the National Football League, and the production was allowed to film at Super Bowl X on January 18, 1976, and shoot extensive footage with the principal actors for the film's final half hour as the Pittsburgh Steelers beat the Dallas Cowboys 21–17. The production returned to the Miami Orange Bowl on January 29, 1976, to film the final moments of the pursuit, as the blimp crashes into the stadium. A mockup nose section of the blimp was recreated. The thousands of extras needed for this footage, which obviously could not be shot during the real Super Bowl, were instead provided by the United Way charity, in exchange for Frankenheimer directing a promotional film for them, narrated by Shaw. Members of the Miami Dolphins were hired and outfitted with Cowboys and Steelers uniforms to appear in the footage as well. During filming of the chaotic scenes of panic as the blimp descends into the crowds, Dolphins player Barry Hill fell and injured himself, requiring a splint and a bandage on his right hand.

=== Blimps ===
Goodyear granted the film use of all three of its U.S.-based blimps for Black Sunday. The blimps were flown by company pilots Nick Nicolary and Corky Belanger Sr., among the five pilots who were involved in the production. The landing and hijacking scenes were filmed at Goodyear's blimp base along Interstate 405 in Carson, California, with the Columbia (N4A). The America (N10A) appeared in a short scene filmed at the Goodyear base at Spring, Texas. The extensive Miami Super Bowl scenes were shot with the blimp Mayflower (N1A), which was of a different design and is noticeably smaller than the Columbia and America. The Mayflower was then based on Watson Island across the Port of Miami. While Goodyear allowed the use of their airship fleet in the film, they did not allow the "Goodyear Wingfoot" logo (prominently featured on the sides of the blimp) to be used in any advertising or movie posters. Thus, the words "Super Bowl" are featured in place of the logo on the blimp in all advertising for the film.

== Music ==
The film's score was composed and conducted by John Williams and performed by the Hollywood Studio Symphony. In January 2010, Film Score Monthly issued a limited edition of 10,000 copies of the previously unreleased soundtrack, remixed from the original masters.

== Reception ==
The film grossed $15.8 million against a budget of $8 million. Director Frankenheimer felt the film was hurt by the fact an earlier movie about terrorism at a championship football game, Two-Minute Warning, had come out just beforehand and performed poorly. He also blamed the film's audience response on the fact the film was banned in Germany and Japan.

The review aggregator website Rotten Tomatoes reports that 76% of critics have given the film a positive review based on 33 reviews. The site's critics consensus reads, "A smart, tense thriller from director John Frankenheimer, Black Sunday succeeds on a technical level, even if it fails to bring its characters to vivid life." On Metacritic, the film has a weighted average score of 57 out of 100 based on 8 critics, indicating "mixed or average" reviews. In general, Black Sunday was appreciated more for its technical virtues and storyline than its character development. Reviewer Vincent Canby from The New York Times tried to rationalize his reaction: "I suspect it has to do with the constant awareness that the story is more important than anybody in it ... The characters don't motivate the drama in any real way." In a later review, Christopher Null took exception and identified the one key character who drove the plot: "... Black Sunday is distinguished by its unique focus not on the hero but on the villain: Bruce Dern ..." John Simon, while praising the acting, said that Black Sunday "is one of those films that are perfectly enjoyable to watch but [about] which there is not all that much to say".

=== Homage ===
Quentin Tarantino has said in interviews that the sequence in Kill Bill: Volume 1 where Daryl Hannah attempts to kill The Bride in disguise as a nurse is an homage to a similar sequence in Black Sunday. More specifically, he said the fact that the sequence in his film is done with split-screens is actually an homage to the trailer for Black Sunday, which shows shots from the sequence in that manner, unlike in the actual film.

=== Satire ===
The film was parodied as "Blimp Sunday" in the issue of Mad magazine #195, in a story written by Dick DeBartolo with art from Mort Drucker.

== See also ==
- List of American football films

== Bibliography ==
- Champlin, Charles, ed. John Frankenheimer: A Conversation With Charles Champlin. Bristol, UK: Riverwood Press, 1995. ISBN 978-1-880756-09-6.
- Dern, Bruce and Robert Crane. Things I've Said, But Probably Shouldn't Have... Indianapolis, Indiana: Wiley, 2007. ISBN 978-0-470-10637-2.
- Pomerance, Murray and R. Barton Palmer, eds. A Little Solitaire: John Frankenheimer and American Film. Piscataway, New Jersey: Rutgers University Press, 2011. ISBN 978-0-8135-5060-2.
