= Lafayette County School District =

Lafayette County School District may refer to:

- Lafayette County School District (Arkansas)
- Lafayette County School District (Mississippi)
