= Denmark, Mississippi =

- Unincorporated community
- Location within Mississippi Location within the United States
- Coordinates: 34°18′39″N 89°20′48″W
- Country: United States
- State: Mississippi
- County: Lafayette
- Elevation: 479 ft (146 m)
- Time zone: UTC-6 (Central (CST))
  - Summer (DST): UTC-5 (CDT)
- Area code: 662
- GNIS feature ID: 693083

Denmark is an unincorporated community in Lafayette County, Mississippi, United States. Denmark is located near Mississippi Highway 6 10.6 miles (17.1 km) east-southeast of Oxford. A post office operated under the name Denmark from 1872 to 1968. In 1900, Denmark had a population of 75.
