= Alexander Preston Shaw =

American pastor, editor and bishop

Alexander Preston Shaw (April 8, 1879 – March 7, 1966) was notable as an African-American pastor, editor, and bishop of the Methodist Episcopal Church and the Methodist Church. He was elected and consecrated to the episcopacy in 1936. Shaw held the distinction of being the first African-American bishop of the Methodist Church (at the age of 71) to preside full-time over a predominantly white Annual Conference: the Southern California-Arizona Conference (in 1950, coincidentally the 100th annual meeting of this body), which met that year at the University of Redlands.

== Birth and family ==
Alexander was born 18 April 1879 in Abbeville in northern Mississippi. He was the eighth of eleven children of the Reverend Duncan Preston and Maria (née Petty) Shaw. Alexander's parents were ex-slaves; his father also an ordained minister in the Methodist Episcopal Church, as was Alexander's elder brother, J. Beverly F. Shaw. Alexander married Lottye Blanche Simon March 29, 1911. They had children Alexander Preston Jr., Bernard Johnson, twins Lena Anita and Bessie Elaine, Helen Marguerite, and Wilbur Allen.

== Education ==
Alexander Sr. earned the A.B. degree from Rust College in 1902. He then earned the B.D. degree from Gammon Theological Seminary in 1906. He also did graduate work at Boston University.

== Ordained and editorial ministry ==
Shaw originally planned a career as a public school teacher. But he was received on trial in 1908 by the Washington Annual Conference of the Methodist Episcopal Church. He was ordained an elder and received into full connection in 1910. Reverend Shaw distinguished himself as a pastor serving the following appointments: Westminster, Maryland (1908–09); Harrisburg, Pennsylvania (1909–11); Winchester, Virginia (1911–15); Little Rock, Arkansas (1915-17); and the Wesley Chapel Methodist Church in Los Angeles (1917–31). He also was a member of the 1928 General Conference of the Methodist Episcopal Church.

Shaw also distinguished himself as the elected editor of the Southwestern Christian Advocate, an important periodical of his denomination. His term of service as editor lasted from 1931 until 1936, during which time he built up the paper from a circulation of about 5,000 to 9,000. Publication was headquartered in New Orleans. He also contributed numerous articles on religious subjects to a variety of publications. Shaw also was a Mason.

== Episcopal ministry ==
Shaw was elected to the episcopacy of the Methodist Episcopal Church and consecrated a bishop (the highest office in the Methodist ministry) by the 1936 General Conference. Shaw was assigned to the New Orleans episcopal area (1936–40), and then to the Baltimore Episcopal Area of the Central Jurisdiction of the Methodist Church (1940–52). As resident bishop of the Baltimore Area, he served as the presiding bishop of the Delaware, East Tennessee, North Carolina, and Washington, D.C. Annual Conferences of the Central Jurisdiction. These conferences together included some 1,300 African American Methodist churches and about 100,000 church members.

Shaw also served on the so-called "Committee of Twenty-eight", the Board of Education, the Board of Missions, the Board of Temperance, and the Committee on World Peace. His office while bishop of the Baltimore Area was located at 1206 Etting Street, Baltimore 17. His home was at 828 North Carrollton Avenue, Baltimore.

== As pastor/preacher ==
Described by Time magazine (in its 26 June 1950 issue) as "tall" (6 ft 3 in; 190 cm), Shaw also was well-poised. When he was appointed to Winchester, Virginia, he found the second-floor ceiling of his parsonage too low for him. When he solved this problem by persuading his congregation to rent him another house, while leasing the parsonage "to a much shorter man", newspapers in the Washington and New York areas delightedly picked up the story, causing the Reverend Shaw "a good deal of embarrassment".

Nevertheless, Shaw was a brilliant preacher. His specialty was his urgent appeal to youth. Speaking of the Wesley Chapel Methodist Episcopal Church in Los Angeles, the city's fifth largest, Shaw said, "My Church was not filled with bald-headed people. We had regularly as many as 200 to 300 youngsters attending services." Reportedly, he would occasionally bring an outstanding boy or girl into the pulpit with him, to lecture on how the church could be made even more interesting to young people.

== Advocate for his race ==
Shaw was also reported by Time magazine as "consistently advocat[ing] self-improvement and development for his race." This was distinguished from "the rough, wild way of pressure groups trying to stamp out anti-Negro activities." Shaw held that "a sufficient amount of real excellence – as has been achieved by Marian Anderson and Dr. Carver and Jackie Robinson – is the surest way." Above all, said Time, "[Bishop Shaw] believe[s] that Negroes should observe the rule he himself has followed with such conspicuous success: take on responsibilities." Said Shaw:

If you don't have responsibilities, you don't grow strong enough to handle them.

== Honorary degrees ==
Shaw was honored by Philander Smith College in 1916 with the Doctor of Divinity degree. Rust College did the same in 1920, as did Gammon Theological Seminary (D.D., 1924). Boston University awarded the D.D. in 1937. Rust College also awarded Shaw the LL.D. in 1937.

== Retirement, death and burial ==
Shaw retired in 1952 from the active episcopacy of the Methodist Church. He was, however, called out of retirement in 1953 to again serve part of the New Orleans Area following the death of Bishop Robert Nathaniel Brooks. Shaw served the rest of that quadrennium (1952–56) in this position.

Shaw died on March 7, 1966. He is buried in Los Angeles.

== Selected writings ==
- Christianizing Race Relations, 1928.

== See also ==
- List of bishops of the United Methodist Church
