= Abbeville, Mississippi =

- Town
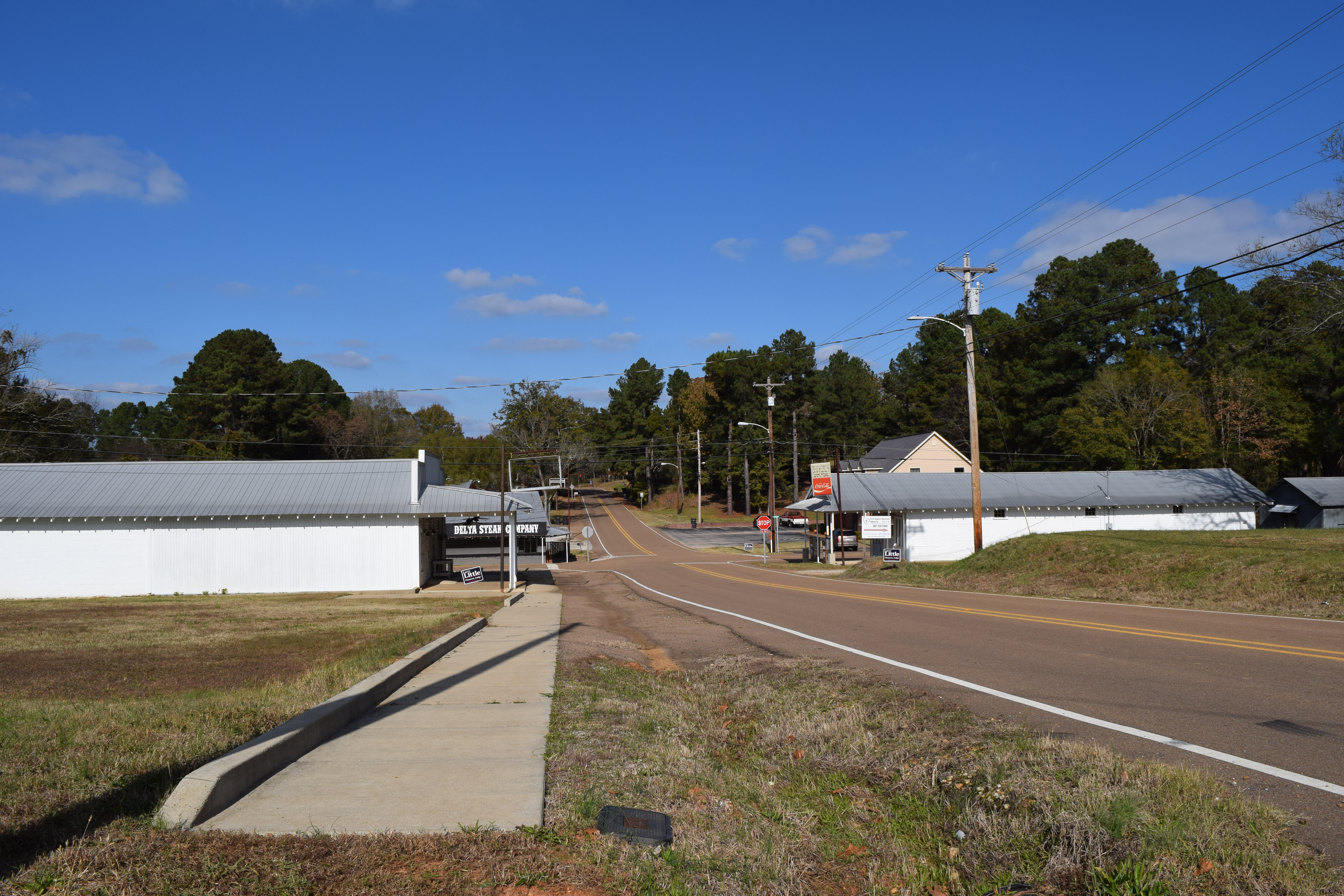
- Downtown Abbeville (2018)

- Location of Abbeville, Mississippi
- Coordinates: 34°30′12″N 89°30′03″W
- Country: United States
- State: Mississippi
- County: Lafayette

Area
  - Total: 3.46 sq mi (8.96 km^{2})
  - Land: 3.46 sq mi (8.96 km^{2})
  - Water: 0 sq mi (0.00 km^{2})
- Elevation: 361 ft (110 m)

Population (2020)
  - Total: 372
  - Density: 108/sq mi (41.5/km^{2})
- Time zone: UTC-6 (Central (CST))
  - Summer (DST): UTC-5 (CDT)
- ZIP code: 38601
- Area code: 662
- FIPS code: 28-00100
- GNIS ID: 2405117
- Website: www.abbeville.ms.gov

Abbeville is a town in Lafayette County, Mississippi, United States. As of the 2020 census, the population was 372.

== History ==
Abbeville was originally settled by pioneers from Abbeville, South Carolina in the 1830s. They lived in apparent peace with the local Chickasaw Indians, whose Chief Toby owned and operated a ferry along the Memphis-Oxford trade route.

During the American Civil War, Abbeville was almost destroyed in the Vicksburg Campaign.

Abbeville post office was established on September 28, 1843, with John B. Davis as the first postmaster.

In 1950 Abbeville had a population of 275.

== Geography ==
According to the United States Census Bureau, the town has a total area of 3.5 square miles (9.1 km^{2}), all land.

=== Climate ===
The climate in this area is characterized by hot, humid summers and generally mild to cool winters. According to the Köppen Climate Classification system, Abbeville has a humid subtropical climate, abbreviated "Cfa" on climate maps.

== Demographics ==
As of the 2020 census, the population is 372 people and 170 housing units, which is down from 2010 with 419 people.

The racial and ethnic makeup of the town was 85.2% non-Hispanic White, 10.4% African American, 3.4% reporting from two or more races with 1.8% of the population Hispanic or Latino.

Historical population
Census	Pop.	Note	%±
1880	223		—
1900	255		—
1910	243		−4.7%
1920	235		−3.3%
1930	243		3.4%
1980	448		—
1990	399		−10.9%
2000	423		6.0%
2010	419		−0.9%
2020	372		−11.2%
U.S. Decennial Census

== Education ==
Abbeville is served by the Lafayette County School District.

The University of Mississippi also owns and operates the University of Mississippi Field Station, which is located in Abbeville. It is a natural laboratory used to study, research and teach about sustainable freshwater ecosystems.

== Transportation ==
=== Highways ===
- Mississippi Highway 7

=== Railroads ===
- Mississippi Central Railroad

== Notable people ==
- Carl Craig, state auditor and tax collector in the 1930s to 1950s
- Jennifer Gillom, WNBA player
- Peggie Gillom-Granderson, former player in the Women's Professional Basketball League
- L. C. Gordon, first African-American basketball player for the Oklahoma State Cowboys
- Stan Kesler, musician, songwriter, producer
- Shelby McEwen, track and field athlete who competed in the 2020 Summer Olympics, 2024 Olympic Silver Medalist
- Alexander Preston Shaw, bishop of the Methodist Church
- Gerald Vaughn, former Canadian Football League defensive back
- Henry Woods, United States district judge for the Eastern District of Arkansas from 1980 to 2002
