= Cari Mora =

2019 novel by Thomas Harris

- First edition (UK)
- Author: Thomas Harris
- Language: English
- Genre: Thriller, crime fiction
- Publisher: Grand Central Publishing (US); William Heinemann (UK)
- Publication date: May 16, 2019 (UK); May 19, 2019 (US)
- Publication place: United States
- Media type: Print (Hardback)
- Pages: 309
- ISBN: 1785152203

Cari Mora is a novel by American author Thomas Harris, published in 2019. It is his first book in 13 years – and only his second overall to not feature Hannibal Lecter. Rather, it is about a young Colombian immigrant in Miami, Caridad "Cari" Mora, who becomes caretaker of a mansion beneath which is hidden twenty-five million dollars in cartel gold. She comes to the attention of Hans-Peter Schneider, a human trafficker and sadistic psychopath.

The novel is set mainly in Miami and Colombia, as shown on this location map.

== Plot ==
Caridad "Cari" Mora is a refugee from Colombia, who fought with the FARC as a teenager and now lives in Miami Beach under temporary protected status. Whilst trying to evade ICE's radar, she works a variety of odd jobs, her favorite being wildlife rehabilitation at Pelican Harbor Seabird Station. She works as caretaker of, and stays in, a house once owned by Pablo Escobar.

Meanwhile, two rival gangs have fixed their attention on the Escobar house because of the $25 million worth of gold that lies beneath it. One is led by Hans-Peter Schneider, an alopecic, Paraguayan-born German, sadistic psychopath whose specialty is human trafficking. The other is the Colombian-based Ten Bells, whose members in the United States include three friends of Cari's in Florida: Captain Marco, Benito and Antonio.

With the aid of the house's corrupt agent Felix, Schneider and his crew get permission to stay in the house for a time, masquerading as filmmakers. Upon meeting Cari, Schneider develops an obsession with her, while Cari distrusts him and his thugs on sight. Shortly after Schneider's arrival, Benito and Antonio also explore the house, posing as laborers. They warn Cari that she must be very cautious around Schneider and his crew. Benito discovers a hole in the lawn, beneath which lies an enormous safe that contains the gold. Schneider discovers Benito's Ten Bells affiliation, forcing Antonio to rescue Benito. Cari leaves the house and goes to stay at the apartment of her cousin and elderly aunt.

Having discovered the location of the safe, both gangs attempt unsuccessfully to access it. Schneider sends Felix down the hole to examine the safe, only for Felix to be attacked and torn in half by a mysterious creature (later revealed to be a saltwater crocodile). With Cari ready to drive his getaway vehicle, Antonio goes in scuba gear to enter the hole from its seaward entrance, but he is spotted and killed by two of Schneider's henchmen. The two thugs then try to kill Cari, who kills them both.

Hans-Peter Schneider repeatedly speaks on the phone with Jesús Villarreal, a former associate of Escobar who brought the gold to Florida thirty years previously. Now bedridden in a hospital in Barranquilla, Villarreal tells Schneider that the safe is guarded by a massive quantity of Semtex which will detonate unless it is opened by the proper method, which Villarreal refuses to divulge unless Schneider pays him a large sum of money. Villarreal is also interrogated by Don Ernesto Ibarra, the head of Ten Bells, who learns no more than Schneider before Schneider has Villarreal assassinated to prevent him from divulging anything more to Don Ernesto. Ernesto sends four assassins to kill Schneider, who kills them all instead. Ernesto comes to Florida to see about the heist firsthand; he meets with Cari and asks her to assist in exchange for a share of the take and a secure nursing home for Cari's sick aunt. With Cari's aid, the Ten Bells crew successfully disarms the explosives, removes the gold from the vault, and makes their escape before alerted authorities stage a raid on the house.

With the gold she has earned from the heist, Cari is able to fulfill her dream of buying her own house and living peacefully while advancing on her path to citizenship. However, Hans-Peter Schneider is plotting to mutilate and traffick her. He abducts Cari and takes her to his boat to deliver her. Cari escapes the boat and swims back to shore with Schneider in pursuit. When he catches up to her, they grapple and she kills him by stabbing him with a concealed blade.

== Critical reception ==
The novel received mixed reviews from critics, some comparing it unfavorably to the Lecter novels.

John Connolly of The Irish Times said, "It is a frustrating, inconsequential confection, one in which...fragments of its creator's earlier brilliance occasionally gleam, rendering the rest more disappointing by comparison," adding: "Cari Mora is rarely dull, because the sensibility of its creator is too atypical for that, but it is careless and underwritten."

Author Stephen King is cited on the cover as saying, "[Harris is] as good as ever. Reading his prose is like running a slow hand down cold silk."

Sarah Ditum of The Guardian dismissed it as "dull," writing: "Without Harris's extremely recognisable name hanging over proceedings, it would be hard to believe Cari Mora was the work of someone who has so much as read a novel, never mind written a blockbuster series."

And The New Statesman welcomes it as: "a tense heist thriller" and " welcome departure from (Harris') narrow and numbing obsession with Lecter."
