= Springdale, Mississippi =

- Unincorporated community
- Location within Mississippi Location within the United States
- Coordinates: 34°13′18″N 89°36′33″W
- Country: United States
- State: Mississippi
- County: Lafayette
- Elevation: 289 ft (88 m)
- Time zone: UTC-6 (Central (CST))
  - Summer (DST): UTC-5 (CDT)
- Area code: 662
- GNIS feature ID: 678163

Springdale is an unincorporated community in Lafayette County, Mississippi. Springdale is located on the former Illinois Central Railroad. The community was incorporated on February 25, 1875, and disincorporated at an unknown date. A post office operated under the name Spring Dale from 1850 to 1887.
