= Sardis Lake (Mississippi) =

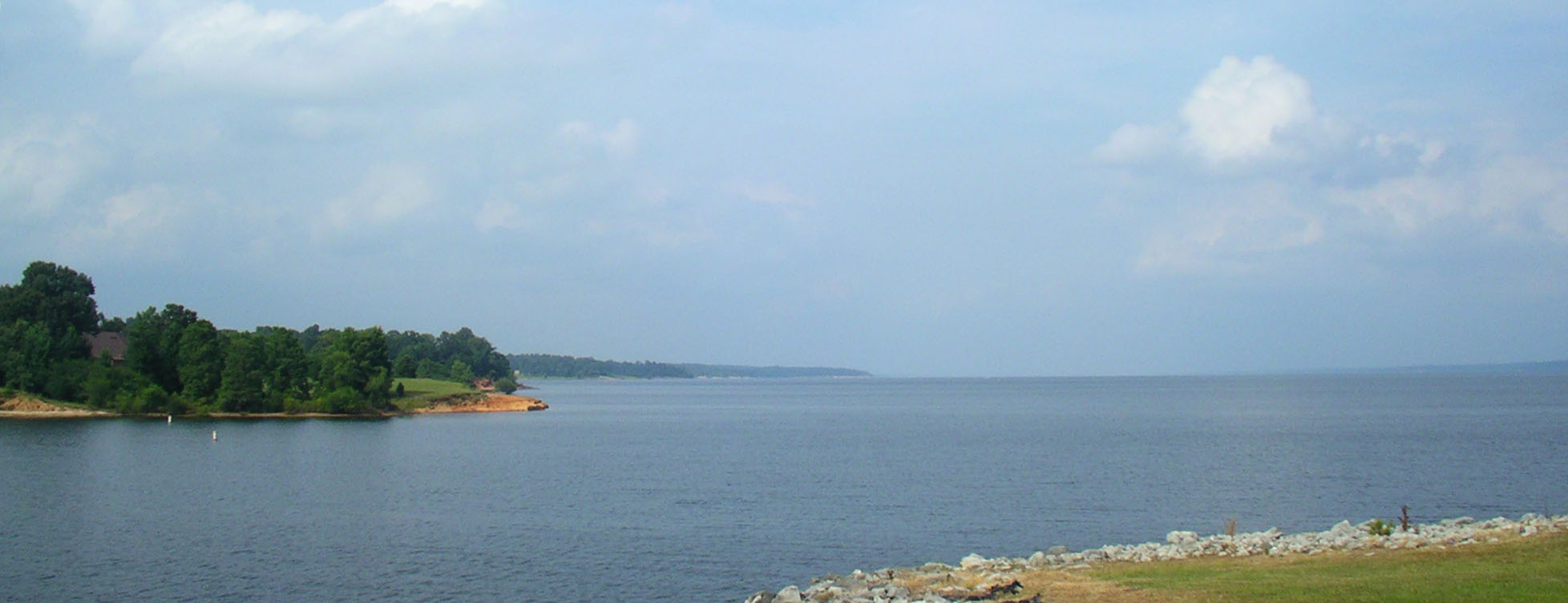
- Sardis Lake from its north shore

- Location within Mississippi Location within the United States
- Interactive map of Sardis Lake
- Location: Lafayette, Panola, and Marshall counties, Mississippi
- Coordinates: 34°28′21″N 89°39′58″W
- Type: reservoir
- Primary inflows: Tallahatchie River
- Primary outflows: Tallahatchie River
- Basin countries: United States
- First flooded: October 1940
- Surface area: 98,520 acres (398.7 km^{2})
- Water volume: 1,512,000 acre-feet (1.865×10^{9} m^{3})
- Surface elevation: 256 ft (78 m)

Sardis Lake is a 98,520-acre (398.7 km^{2}) reservoir on the Tallahatchie River in Lafayette, Panola, and Marshall counties, Mississippi. Sardis Lake is impounded by Sardis Dam, located nine miles (14 km) southeast of the town of Sardis. It is approximately an hour drive from Memphis, Tennessee. The dam is 15,300 feet (4,700 m) long, has an average height of 97 feet (30 m), and a maximum height of 117 feet (36 m).

== History ==
Sardis Dam was the first of the Yazoo River headwaters projects to be built by the federal government for flood control. Authorization for the project came when President Franklin D. Roosevelt signed the Flood Control Act of 1936. Construction took four years and required thousands of men to clear fourteen miles (23 km) along the Tallahatchie River, which was characterized by dense woods and undergrowth, and meandering sloughs.

The dam was constructed using a "hydraulic fill" technique that required soil to be dredged from below the dam site and pumped to form the earth fill, which forms the majority of the dam. The U.S. Army Corps of Engineers built and operated the "Pontotoc", a special dredge powered by two 3,000 horsepower (2,200 kW) electric motors to accomplish this task. The 425-acre (1.72 km^{2}) "Lower Lake" on the downstream side of Sardis Dam was created by the dredging operation. It has numerous recreation facilities, including John W. Kyle State Park. Mississippi Highway 315 splits while crossing the dam, with one route crossing the top and the other half crossing the base.

Sardis Lake has a maximum storage capacity of 1,512,000 acre-feet (1.865 km^{3}) of water. The lake is gradually drawn down during the fall and winter months to a "conservation pool" of 9,800 acres (40 km^{2}). This permits spring rains across the lake's 1,545 square miles (4,000 km^{2}) watershed to fill the reservoir without flooding downstream. Since the dam became operational, the dam's emergency spillway has been overtopped only three times by high water—in 1973, 1983 and 1991. The lake's typical "recreation pool" is 32,500 acres (132 km^{2}).

The lake is popular with anglers and has a reputation for its abundant bass and crappie. Other recreation activities include hunting, camping, boating, skiing, swimming and picnicking.

== Marina ==
The Sardis Lake Marina services the lake with access to fuel docks, wet slips, a restaurant, and a store.

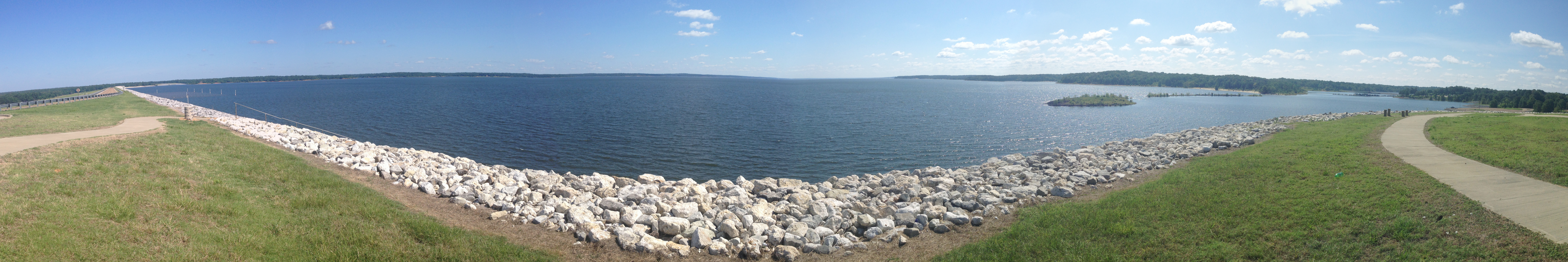
Sardis Lake viewed from top of Sardis Dam

== Ecology ==
The main fish species that live in the lake are largemouth bass, spotted bass, blue catfish, channel catfish, flathead catfish, black crappie, white crappie, bluegill, redear sunfish, and white bass.
