= Paris, Mississippi =

- Census-designated place
- Location within Mississippi Location within the United States
- Coordinates: 34°10′29″N 89°27′06″W
- Country: United States
- State: Mississippi
- County: Lafayette

Area
  - Total: 1.22 sq mi (3.15 km^{2})
  - Land: 1.22 sq mi (3.15 km^{2})
  - Water: 0 sq mi (0.00 km^{2})
- Elevation: 374 ft (114 m)

Population (2020)
  - Total: 163
  - Density: 134.0/sq mi (51.74/km^{2})
- Time zone: UTC-6 (Central (CST))
  - Summer (DST): UTC-5 (CDT)
- Area code: 662
- GNIS feature ID: 2812729

Paris is a census-designated place (CDP) and unincorporated community in Lafayette County, Mississippi, United States. Paris is located at the junction of Mississippi Highway 9W and Mississippi Highway 315 10 miles (16 km) east of Water Valley.

Pern the 2020 Census, the population was 163.

== Demographics ==
Historical population
| Census | Pop. | Note | %± |
|---|---|---|---|
| 2020 | 163 | | — |
U.S. Decennial Census; 2020

Paris was first listed as a census designated place in the 2020 U.S. census.

=== 2020 census ===
Paris CDP, Mississippi – Racial and ethnic composition Note: the US Census treats Hispanic/Latino as an ethnic category. This table excludes Latinos from the racial categories and assigns them to a separate category. Hispanics/Latinos may be of any race.
| Race / Ethnicity (NH = Non-Hispanic) | Pop 2020 | % 2020 |
|---|---|---|
| White alone (NH) | 138 | 84.66% |
| Black or African American alone (NH) | 6 | 3.68% |
| Native American or Alaska Native alone (NH) | 2 | 1.23% |
| Asian alone (NH) | 0 | 0.00% |
| Pacific Islander alone (NH) | 0 | 0.00% |
| Some Other Race alone (NH) | 0 | 0.00% |
| Mixed Race or Multi-Racial (NH) | 12 | 7.36% |
| Hispanic or Latino (any race) | 5 | 3.07% |
| Total | 163 | 100.00% |

== Education ==
It is in the Lafayette County School District.

== Notable person ==
- Theora Hamblett, Mississippi artist, was born in Paris.
