= L. C. Gordon =

American basketball coach (1937–2023)

Biographical details
- Born: June 11, 1937; Abbeville, Mississippi, U.S.
- Died: November 4, 2023 (aged 86); Memphis, Tennessee, U.S.

Playing career
- 1958–1961: Oklahoma State

Coaching career (HC unless noted)
- 1966–1969: Carver HS
- 1969–1973: Texas Southern

Head coaching record
- Overall: 63–43 (.594)

Lavalius Cyrone Gordon (June 11, 1937 – November 4, 2023) was an American basketball player and coach. He played college basketball for the Oklahoma State Cowboys from 1958 to 1961, where he was the first African-American to play for the team. Gordon served as the head coach of the Texas Southern Tigers from 1969 to 1973.

== Early life ==
Gordon was born in Abbeville, Mississippi, and was raised in Memphis, Tennessee, where he played basketball at Booker T. Washington High School. The head coach of the Memphis Tigers, Bob Vanatta, told Gordon that Cowboys head coach Henry Iba was prepared to integrate his team and recruited Gordon on behalf of Iba; Gordon committed to play for the Cowboys without visiting the university's campus. As a guard, Gordon had considered himself as an offensive player but was converted to become the team's defensive specialist by Iba and assigned to guard the opponents' best scorers. He suffered from the effects of racism and segregation as the only black player on the Cowboys but credited his teammates with helping to embrace him.

Gordon graduated from Oklahoma State University in 1961 with a Bachelor of Science degree in secondary education. He earned a master's degree in administration and supervision from the University of Memphis and a master's degree in physical education from Texas Southern University.

== Coaching career ==
Gordon was named head coach of the Texas Southern Tigers in 1969 after serving as the basketball coach at Carver High School the three previous years. He amassed a 63–43 record over four seasons. Gordon resigned as head coach of the Tigers on September 5, 1973.

== Personal life ==
Gordon's son, Lavalius Jr., played college football and basketball for the North Texas Mean Green. His grandson, Trent, plays college football for the Arkansas Razorbacks.

Gordon was honored by Oklahoma State University as the grand marshal of homecoming in 2013 and was a life member of the OSU Alumni Association.

Gordon died on November 4, 2023, in Memphis, Tennessee, at the age of 86
