= Black Sunday (novel) =

1975 novel by American writer Thomas Harris

- First edition cover
- Author: Thomas Harris
- Language: English
- Genre: Crime novel, Psychological thriller
- Publisher: G.P. Putnam's Sons
- Publication date: 1975
- Publication place: United States
- Media type: Print (hardback)
- Pages: 318
- ISBN: 0-399-11443-2
- OCLC: 1123602
- Dewey Decimal: 813/.5/4
- LC Class: PZ4.H3163 Bl PS3558.A656

Black Sunday is a 1975 novel by American writer Thomas Harris.

The novel is a thriller about a plot by terrorists to commit mass murder during the Super Bowl in New Orleans, and law enforcement efforts to stop them. Harris wrote the novel after watching the 1972 Munich Olympics hostage crisis, where members of the Black September Organization took Israeli athletes hostage and murdered them.

It was the first novel by Harris, and achieved only moderate success until it was sold to Hollywood. The 1977 film adaptation was a moderate critical and financial success, and sparked interest in the novel. Black Sunday is one of the two books by Harris not to involve the serial killer Hannibal Lecter. In his introduction to a new printing of the novel in 2007, Harris states that the driven, focused character of terrorist Dahlia Iyad was an inspiration for and precursor to Clarice Starling in his later Lecter novels.

== Plot ==
Michael Lander is a pilot who flies the Aldrich Blimp over NFL football games to cover them for network television. He is also secretly deranged by years of torture as a prisoner of war in Vietnam, a bitter court martial on his return, and a failed marriage. He longs to commit suicide and to take with him as many as possible of the cheerful, carefree American civilians he sees from his blimp each weekend.

Lander conspires with Dahlia Iyad, an operative from the Palestinian terrorist group Black September, to launch a suicide attack using a bomb composed of plastique and a quarter million flechettes, housed on the underside of the gondola of the blimp, which they will detonate over Tulane Stadium during a Super Bowl between the Miami Dolphins and the Washington Redskins. Dahlia and Black September, in turn, intend the attack as a wake-up call for the American people, to turn their attention and the world's to the plight of the Palestinians.

American and Israeli intelligence, led by Mossad agent David Kabakov and FBI agent Sam Corley, race to prevent the catastrophe. They piece together the path of the explosives into the country, and Dahlia's own movements.

In the novel's conclusion, the bomb-carrying blimp is chased by helicopters as it approaches the packed stadium. The blimp manages to crash into the stadium, causing mass panic and destruction, but Kabakov's helicopter manages to pull the blimp out of the packed stadium just seconds before the weapon detonates over the Mississippi River. The explosion kills hundreds, including Kabakov, but thanks to their efforts they manage to prevent the death of tens of thousands more people.

== Film adaptation ==
In 1977, a film was made based on the novel starring Robert Shaw and Bruce Dern and directed by John Frankenheimer. The following is a list of elements of the novel that were changed for the movie:

- The Super Bowl is moved from a fictional matchup between Miami and Washington in New Orleans' Tulane Stadium (the two teams had met in a Super Bowl in the 1970s, but that was Super Bowl VII which took place at the Los Angeles Memorial Coliseum) to the actual Super Bowl X between the Pittsburgh Steelers and Dallas Cowboys in Miami's Orange Bowl.
- The fictional "Aldrich" blimp in the novel, is replaced by the genuine Goodyear Blimp in the film.
- Moshevsky is not killed in the novel, and is the last character depicted as he boards his flight back to Israel.
- Kabakov and Agent Corley are both killed in the explosion of the blimp in the novel, but both survive in the film.
- Mohammed Fasil is arrested and Moshevsky brings him to be tried for his masterminding of the Munich Massacre at the end of the book. In the film, Fasil is killed by Kabakov when his Miami location is discovered.
- The novel states that "the final casualty list totaled 512", including 14 deaths at the stadium. The movie implies that, while there were certainly injuries and probably deaths in the stadium during the panicked chaos when the blimp was flown in, the dirigible was dragged quickly and far enough away from the location to ultimately explode all of its deadly ordnance into the Atlantic Ocean and not cause casualties there.
