= Riverside, Lafayette County, Mississippi =

Riverside, Mississippi
- Ghost town
- Location within Mississippi Location within the United States
- Coordinates: 34°30′35″N 89°21′45″W
- Country: United States
- State: Mississippi
- County: Lafayette
- Elevation: 295 ft (90 m)
- Time zone: UTC-6 (Central (CST))
  - Summer (DST): UTC-5 (CDT)
- GNIS feature ID: 706743

Riverside is a ghost town located in Lafayette County, Mississippi, United States.

The settlement began in 1838 as a farming community on the south side of the Tallahatchie River.

The first settlers were Uriah Temple and P.M. Duncan.

An early post office at Riverside was discontinued in 1910.
