= John W. Kyle =

American judge

John William Kyle (August 21, 1891 – 1965) was an American politician and judge from Mississippi who served on the Supreme Court of Mississippi from 1950 until his death in 1965.

Kyle was born in Batesville, Mississippi, as the oldest of eight children, to Mary Francis née Heflin and Albert Sidney Kyle.

He was a Rhodes Scholar and served multiple terms as a state senator for the district including Sardis (which, in the previous century, John C. Kyle had also represented in the senate).

After serving as state attorney general, he was appointed in 1950 a commissioner (judge) of the state supreme court, running unopposed in the subsequent special election, and in the elections of 1952 and 1960, serving until 1965.

John W. Kyle State Park, in Mississippi, is named after him.

Political offices
Preceded by Lemuel Augustus Smith	Justice of the Supreme Court of Mississippi; 1950–1965	Succeeded by Lemuel Augustus Smith Jr.
