= John W. Kyle State Park =

State park in Mississippi, United States

- Location within Mississippi
- Location: Panola County, Mississippi, United States
- Coordinates: 34°25′50″N 89°48′10″W
- Elevation: 299 ft (91 m)
- Administrator: Mississippi Department of Wildlife, Fisheries, and Parks
- Designation: Mississippi state park
- Named for: Politician John W. Kyle
- Website: Official website

John W. Kyle State Park is a public recreation area in the U.S. state of Mississippi. The state park is located off Mississippi Highway 315 on Sardis Reservoir, six miles (9.7 km) east of Sardis. It is named after John W. Kyle, a former Mississippi state senator and a former U.S. Representative from Mississippi.

== Activities and amenities ==
The park features boating and fishing on 98,000-acre (40,000 ha) Sardis Reservoir, 200 campsites, 20 cabins, visitors center, picnic area, and an 18-hole regulation golf course, Mallard Pointe.
