= Thomas Harris =

American writer (born 1940)

- Born: William Thomas Harris III; September 22, 1940 (age 85); Jackson, Tennessee, U.S.
- Education: Baylor University
- Occupation: Novelist
- Spouse: Harriet Anne Haley (m. 1961; div. 1968)
- Partner: Pace Barnes
- Children: 1
- Writing career
- Period: 1975–present
- Genres: Crime, horror, suspense
- Notable works: Black Sunday; Red Dragon; The Silence of the Lambs; Hannibal; Hannibal Rising; Cari Mora

William Thomas Harris III (born September 22, 1940) is an American writer. He is the author of a series of suspense novels featuring the character Hannibal Lecter. The majority of his works have been adapted into films and television, including The Silence of the Lambs, which became the third film to win Academy Awards in all of the five major categories. Harris's novels have sold more than 50 million copies, with The Silence of the Lambs selling 10 million copies as of 2019.

== Biography ==
Harris was born in Jackson, Tennessee, but moved as a child with his family to Rich, Mississippi. He was introverted and bookish in grade school and then blossomed in high school. He attended Baylor University in Waco, Texas, where he majored in English and graduated in 1964. While in college, he worked as a reporter for the local newspaper, the Waco Tribune-Herald, covering the police beat. In 1968, he moved to New York City to work for the Associated Press until 1974 when he began work on his debut novel, Black Sunday.

== Reception ==
The Silence of the Lambs received positive reviews, won several genre awards, and sold over 10 million copies. Its follow-up, Hannibal, received high praise from Stephen King, but John Lanchester said it had a "sense of discontinuity". The novelist John Dunning said Harris was "a talent of the first rank". In 2019, Harris elaborated on his process, described as "almost passive", by saying: "Sometimes you really have to shove and grunt and sweat. Some days you go to your office and you're the only one who shows up, none of the characters show up, and you sit there by yourself, feeling like an idiot. And some days everybody shows up ready to work. You have to show up at your office every day. If an idea comes by, you want to be there to get it in." In 2007, Harris was presented with a Bram Stoker Award for Lifetime Achievement.

== Personal life ==
Harris avoids publicity and participated in few interviews between 1976 and 2019. At Baylor University, he met fellow student Harriet Anne Haley and they married in June 1961. They had one daughter, Elizabeth Anne, and divorced in August 1968. Harris remained close to his mother, Polly, and called her every night no matter where he was. He often discussed particular scenes from his novels with her. Polly died on December 31, 2011.

As of 1991, Harris lived in South Florida and had a summer home in Sag Harbor, New York. His partner as of 1999 was Pace Barnes, who, according to USA Today, worked in publishing and "is as outgoing as he is quiet". Harris' friend and literary agent Morton Janklow described him as "wonderfully jovial" and a passionate chef, with "a courtliness you associate with the South".

In his first major interview in 43 years, with The New York Times in 2019 to promote Cari Mora, Harris said he was a nature lover, and a long-time visitor and volunteer of the Pelican Harbor Seabird Station, an animal rescue center in Miami, Florida, for 20 years. The staff were not aware of Harris's fame until a few years before the 2019 interview. He described fame as "more of a nuisance than anything else".

== Works ==
- Black Sunday (1975)
- Cari Mora (2019)

=== Hannibal Lecter novels ===
1. Red Dragon (1981)
2. The Silence of the Lambs (1988)
3. Hannibal (1999)
4. Hannibal Rising (2006; prequel)

=== Screenplays ===
- Hannibal Rising (2007)

== See also ==
- Hannibal Lecter (franchise)

== Sources ==
- "Polly Coleman Harris", The Bolivar Commercial, January 3, 2012, archived from the original on June 22, 2013
- Conklin, Mike (April 18, 1999), "Hannibal is up to his old tricks in 'Silence' sequel", Lubbock Avalanche Journal, archived from the original on October 4, 2012
- Cowley, Jason (November 19, 2006), "Creator of a Monstrous Hit", The Observer
- Dunning, John. Booked to Die. New York: Charles Scribner's Sons, 1992.
- Laughlin, Meg (August 15, 1999), "The hunt for Thomas Harris", Houston Chronicle, archived from the original on August 15, 2013
- Minzesheimer, Bob (December 2, 1999), "Hungry fans eat up 'Hannibal'", USA Today
- Sexton, David. The Strange World of Thomas Harris. London: Short Books, 2001.
- Streibling, William (2001). "The Mississippi Writers Page; Thomas Harris". Archived from the original on October 11, 2015.
