= Lafayette County School District (Mississippi) =

School district in Mississippi, United States

- 100 Commodore DR Oxford, MS, 38655

District information
- Grades: PK-12
- NCES District ID: 2802370

Students and staff
- Students: 2,877 (2023-24)
- Teachers: 232.04 (FTE)
- Student–teacher ratio: 12.40

The Lafayette County School District is a public school district based in Lafayette County, Mississippi (USA).

The district serves Abbeville, Paris, Taylor, and Tula, as well as most unincorporated rural areas in Lafayette County. The district incorporates a few outerlying sections of Oxford.

The district administration, middle school, and high school are along Commodore Drive in the city limits of Oxford.

== Schools ==
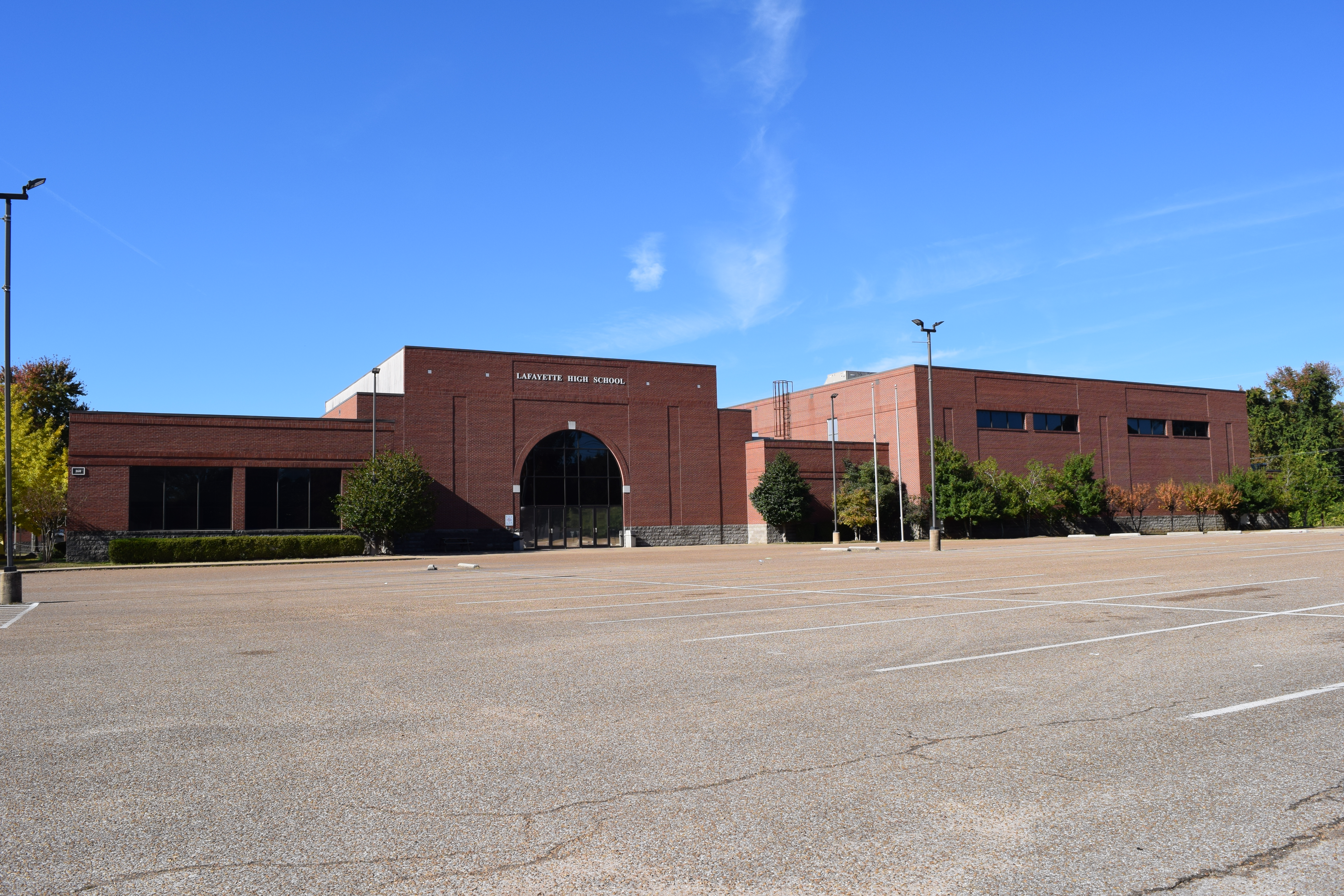
Lafayette High School

All are in the Oxford city limits.

- Lafayette High School (Grades 9-12)
- Lafayette Middle School (Grades 7-8)
- Lafayette Upper Elementary School (Grade 6)
- Lafayette Upper Elementary School (Grades 3-5)
- Lafayette Lower Elementary School (Grades K-2)

== Demographics ==
=== 2006-07 school year ===
There were a total of 2,394 students enrolled in the Lafayette County School District during the 2006–2007 school year. The gender makeup of the district was 47% female and 53% male. The racial makeup of the district was 29.20% African American, 69.13% White, 1.42% Hispanic, 0.13% Native American, and 0.13% Asian. 44.2% of the district's students were eligible to receive free lunch.

=== Previous school years ===
School Year	Enrollment	Gender Makeup		Racial Makeup				
School Year	Enrollment	Female	Male	Asian	African American	Hispanic	Native American	White
2005-06	2,375	48%	52%	0.17%	29.60%	1.31%	0.13%	68.80%
2004-05	2,227	48%	52%	0.04%	29.55%	1.21%	0.04%	69.15%
2003-04	2,193	48%	52%	0.09%	29.09%	1.05%	0.05%	69.72%
2002-03	2,116	47%	53%	0.09%	31.33%	0.66%	0.09%	67.82%

== Accountability statistics ==
	2006-07	2005-06	2004-05	2003-04	2002-03
District Accreditation Status	Accredited	Accredited	Accredited	Accredited	Accredited
School Performance Classifications
Level 5 (Superior Performing) Schools	1	1	1	1	1
Level 4 (Exemplary) Schools	2	2	1	2	2
Level 3 (Successful) Schools	0	0	1	0	0
Level 2 (Under Performing) Schools	0	0	0	0	0
Level 1 (Low Performing) Schools	0	0	0	0	0
Not Assigned	0	0	0	0	0

== See also ==
- List of school districts in Mississippi
