= Rich, Mississippi =

- Unincorporated community
- Location within Mississippi Location within the United States
- Coordinates: 34°24′58″N 90°26′41″W
- Country: United States
- State: Mississippi
- County: Coahoma
- Elevation: 180 ft (55 m)
- Time zone: UTC-6 (Central (CST))
  - Summer (DST): UTC-5 (CDT)
- ZIP codes: 38617
- GNIS feature ID: 676627

Rich is an unincorporated community in Coahoma County, Mississippi, United States.

The settlement is located along the Yazoo Pass waterway.

== History ==
First called Yazoo Pass Station, the settlement was a stop along a now-abandoned section of the Illinois Central Railroad. The present name is derived from the last name of one Mr. Richenberger, a local merchant.

The population in 1900 was 30. A post office operated under the name Rich from 1888 to 1994.

== Notable person ==
- Thomas Harris, writer.
