= Orwood, Mississippi =

- Ghost town
- Location within Mississippi Location within the United States
- Coordinates: 34°15′32″N 89°43′05″W
- Country: United States
- State: Mississippi
- County: Lafayette
- Elevation: 397 ft (121 m)
- Time zone: UTC-6 (Central (CST))
  - Summer (DST): UTC-5 (CDT)
- GNIS feature ID: 684410

Orwood is a ghost town in southwestern Lafayette County, Mississippi. It was originally spelled “Orrwood,” but at some point the second “r” was dropped.

"The town was first settled by Green McKie who settled a farm in 1837. Later Charles H. Gray of Mecklenburg County, North Carolina moved to Orwood in 1839. Charles Gray was a wealthy planter who lost his fortune during the civil war. He has a beautiful old Southern Colonial home built by William Turner in 1854. According to the 1936 WPA records it was of the same design as the John Culley home in Oxford. Gray’s son, Dr. Ed Gray was living in the community during the yellow fever epidemic of 1876. The Entire Gray family fell ill with yellow fever and Dr. Gray died. His widow lived on in the family house for many years. Other early planters in Orwood were Nathaniel Dobson Gray, Ira Addison Orr, Josiah Robertson, Angus Lakey, Robert Nickle, John Henderson, Cyrus Wilson, Tom Robinson, and N. Brasel."

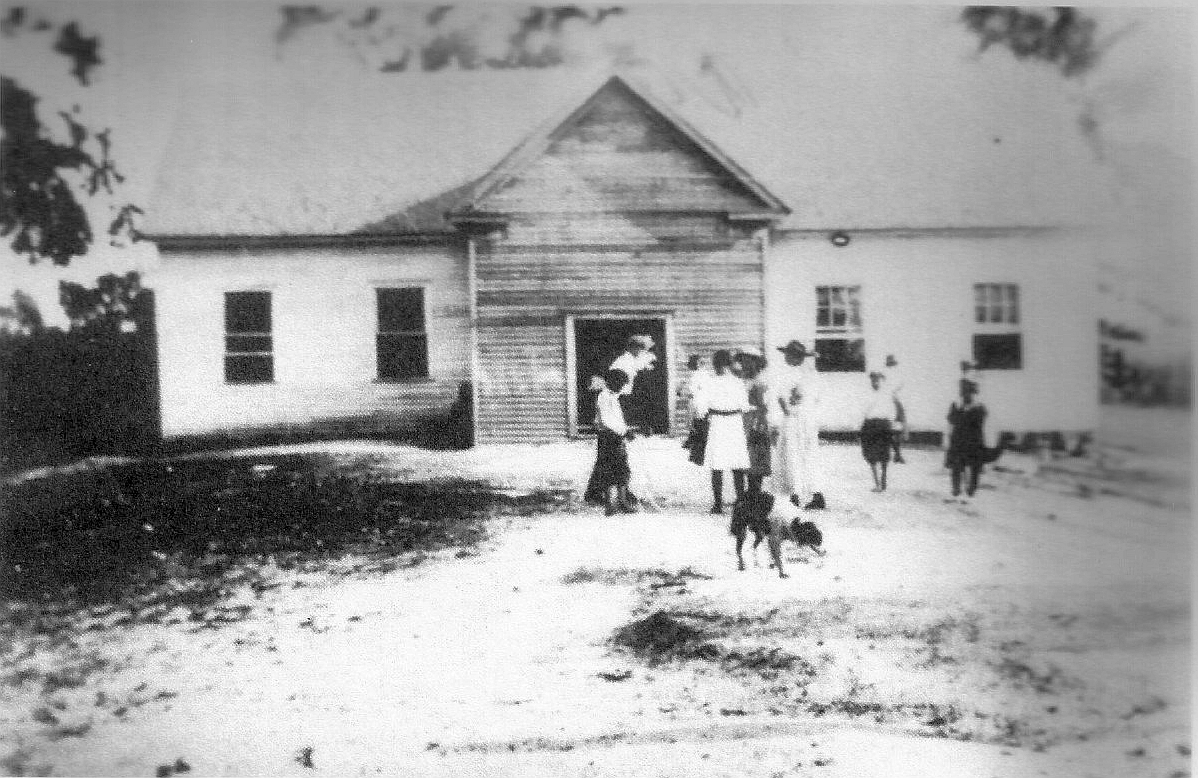
The early days of the Orwood Schoolhouse.

Orwood had a successful school at one time. The early school was located behind the present Sand Spring Church. Another building was erected about 1910. It was described by O. D. Smith in 1937 as a frame building costing $300.00. Early records indicate a fairly large attendance. The people of Orwood realized the importance of education. Some of them traveled many miles over very bad roads to attend. Most teachers boarded with local families.

In addition to the church and school there was also a post office, general store, and a grist mill. Although Orwood is no longer its own township the Sand Spring Presbyterian Church still operates as a center of the remaining families in the area and still holds weekly services.
