= Mississippi Highway 9W =

Highway in Mississippi

Mississippi Highway 9W
- MS 9W highlighted in pink

Route information
- Maintained by MDOT
- Length: 20.3 mi (32.7 km)
- Existed: 1956–present

Major junctions
- South end: MS 9 near Bruce
- MS 315 in Paris
- North end: MS 7 near Oxford

Location
- Country: United States
- State: Mississippi
- Counties: Calhoun, Lafayette

Highway system
- Mississippi State Highway System; Interstate; US; State
← MS 9	→ I-10

Mississippi Highway 9W (MS 9W) is a 20.3-mile (32.7 km) long state highway located in northern Mississippi. The southern terminus of the route is at MS 9 north of Bruce in Calhoun County while the northern terminus is at MS 7 south of Oxford in Lafayette County. The route is a two-lane undivided road its entire length and passes through rural areas of woods and farms. Along the way, MS 9W intersects MS 315 in Paris. MS 9W was designated to follow its current alignment in 1956 and was fully paved from a gravel road by 1960.

== Route description ==
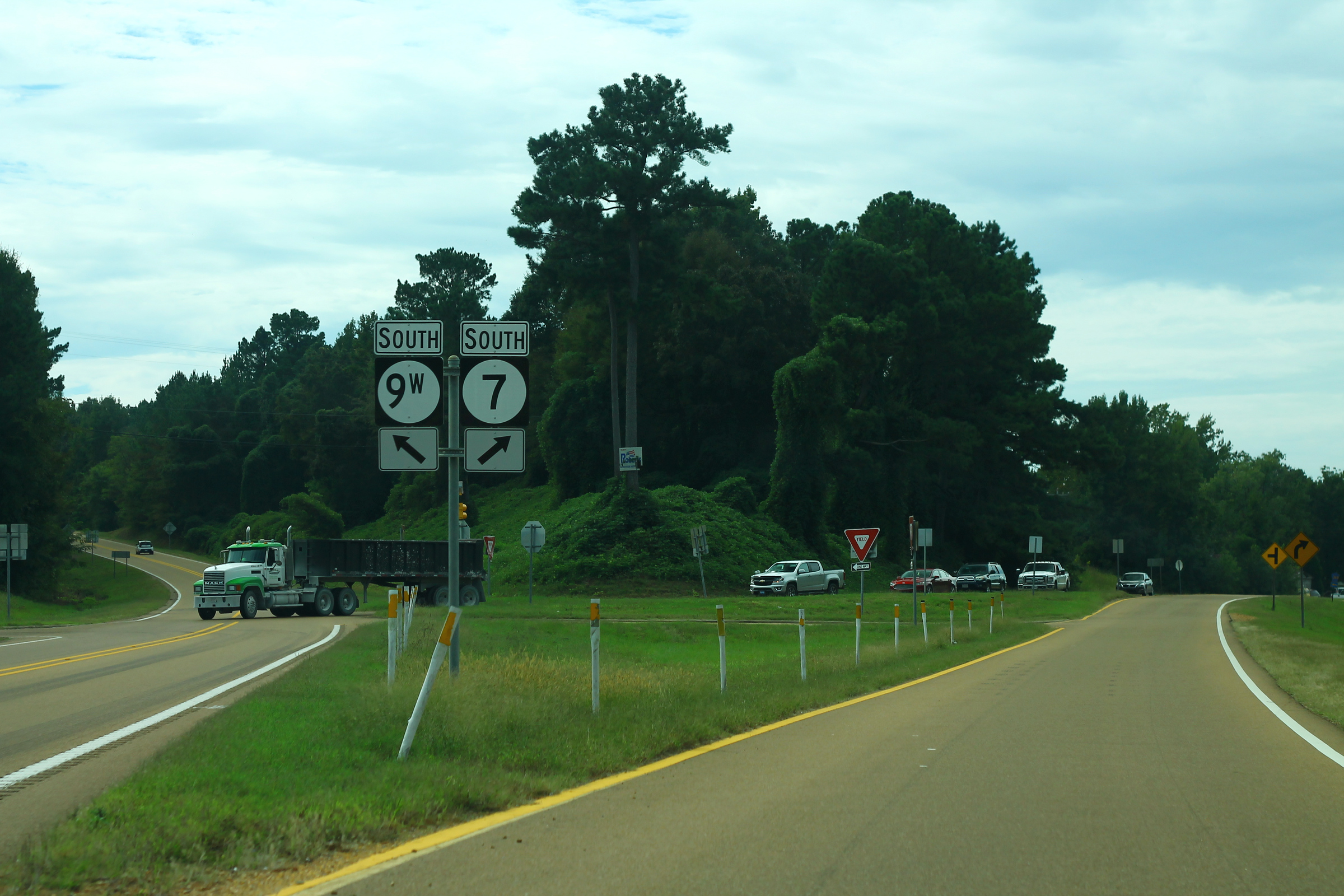
MS 9W's northern terminus at MS 7

MS 9W begins at an intersection with MS 9 to the north of Bruce in Calhoun County. The route heads northwest on a two-lane undivided road through a mix of woods and farmlands with a few homes. The road turns to the north and reaches the community of Banner, where the road crosses two County Roads: CR 275 and CR 267. MS 9W enters a dense forest as it curves northwest again and heads into more agricultural fields, coming to a junction with CR 284. After crossing into Lafayette County, the route reaches the community of Paris and intersects the eastern terminus of MS 315 as well as CR 428. After this intersection, MS 9W passes through several more miles of forests, intersecting CR 371 before reaching its terminus at MS 7 to the south of Oxford. MS 9W is legally defined in Mississippi Code § 65-3-3.

== History ==
MS 9W was designated in 1956 for a gravel road connecting MS 9 north of Bruce to MS 7 south of Oxford. By 1960, the entire route was paved. Since then, the route has not undergone any alignment changes.

== Major intersections ==
County	Location	mi	km	Destinations	Notes
Calhoun		0.0	0.0	MS 9 – Bruce, Pontotoc	Southern terminus
Lafayette	Paris	13.3	21.4	MS 315 north / MS 812 east – Water Valley, Paris	Southern terminus of MS 315; western terminus of MS 812
Lafayette		20.3	32.7	MS 7 – Oxford, Water Valley	Northern terminus
1.000 mi = 1.609 km; 1.000 km = 0.621 mi
