= Lafayette County, Mississippi =

County in Mississippi, United States

- County
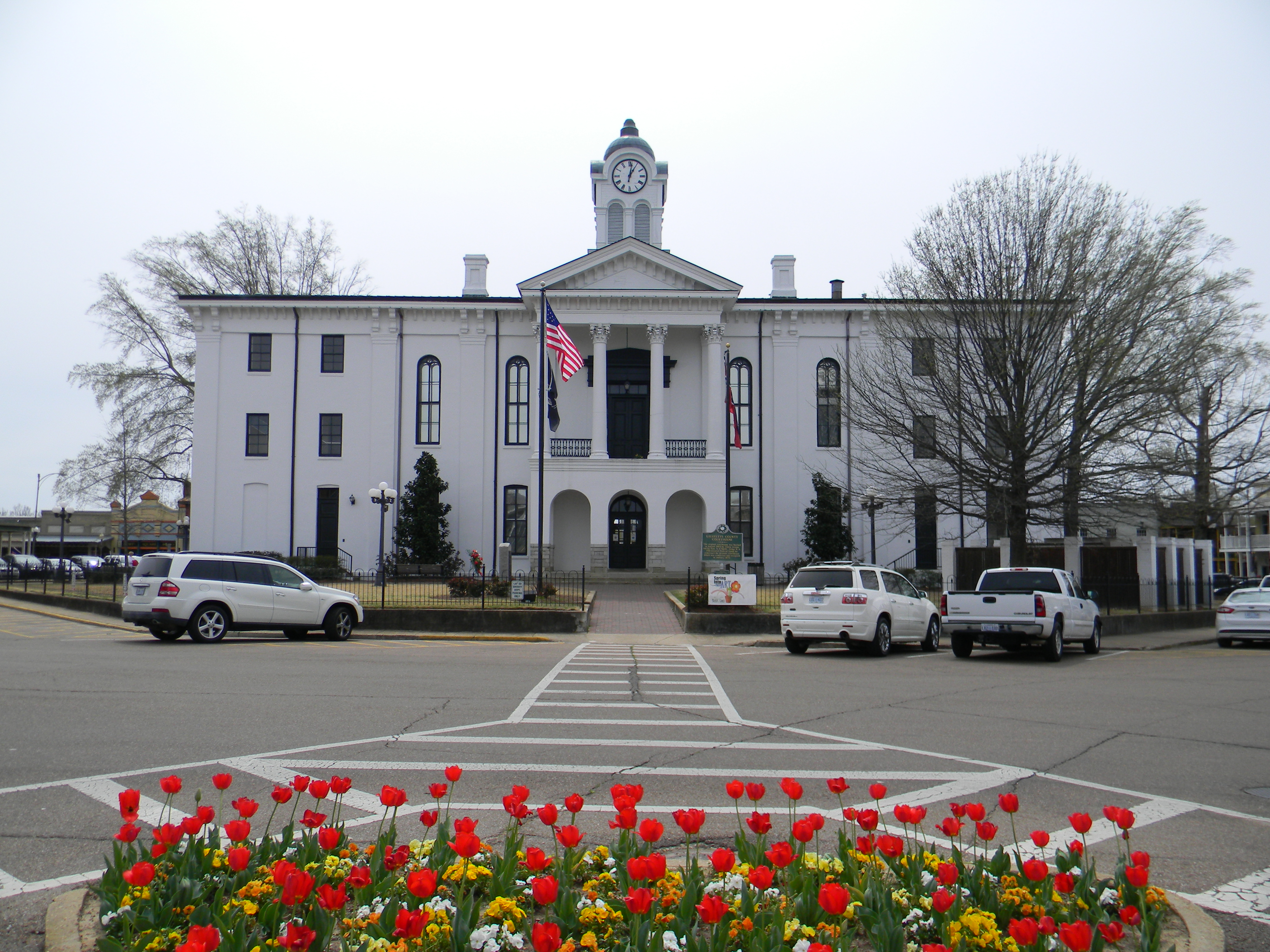
- The north façade of the Lafayette County Courthouse

- Logo

- Location within the U.S. state of Mississippi
- Country: United States
- State: Mississippi
- Established: February 9, 1836 (190 years ago)
- Named for: Marquis de Lafayette
- Seat: Oxford
- Largest city: Oxford

Area
  - Total: 679 sq mi (1,760 km^{2})
  - Land: 632 sq mi (1,640 km^{2})
  - Water: 47 sq mi (120 km^{2}) 7.0%

Population (2020)
  - Total: 55,813
  - Estimate (2025): 59,597 ▲
  - Density: 88.3/sq mi (34.1/km^{2})
- Time zone: UTC−6 (Central)
  - Summer (DST): UTC−5 (CDT)
- Congressional district: 1st
- Website: lafayettems.com

Lafayette County is a county in the U.S. state of Mississippi. At the 2020 census, the population was 55,813. Its county seat is Oxford. The local pronunciation of the name is "la-FAY-et." The county's name honors Marquis de Lafayette, a French military hero and American general who fought during the American Revolutionary War.

The Oxford, MS Micropolitan Statistical Area includes all of Lafayette County. The county is policed by the Lafayette County Sheriff's Department.

Lafayette County is often regarded as the inspiration for Yoknapatawpha County, the fictional setting of many of William Faulkner's works.

== Geography ==
According to the U.S. Census Bureau, the county has a total area of 679 square miles (1,760 km^{2}), of which 632 square miles (1,640 km^{2}) is land and 47 square miles (120 km^{2}) (7.0%) is water.

=== Major highways ===
- U.S. Route 278
- Mississippi Highway 6
- Mississippi Highway 7
- Mississippi Highway 9W
- Mississippi Highway 30
- Mississippi Highway 315
- Mississippi Highway 331
- Mississippi Highway 334

=== Adjacent counties ===
- Marshall County (north)
- Union County (northeast)
- Pontotoc County (southeast)
- Calhoun County (south)
- Yalobusha County (southwest)
- Panola County (west)
- Tate County (northwest)

=== National protected area ===
- Holly Springs National Forest (part)

== Demographics ==
Historical population
Census	Pop.	Note	%±
1840	6,531		—
1850	14,069		115.4%
1860	16,125		14.6%
1870	18,802		16.6%
1880	21,671		15.3%
1890	20,553		−5.2%
1900	22,110		7.6%
1910	21,883		−1.0%
1920	19,243		−12.1%
1930	19,978		3.8%
1940	21,257		6.4%
1950	22,798		7.2%
1960	21,355		−6.3%
1970	24,181		13.2%
1980	31,030		28.3%
1990	31,826		2.6%
2000	38,744		21.7%
2010	47,351		22.2%
2020	55,813		17.9%
2025 (est.)	59,597	▲	6.8%
U.S. Decennial Census; 1790–1960 1900–1990; 1990–2000 2010–2020

=== Racial and ethnic composition ===
Lafayette County, Mississippi – Racial and ethnic composition Note: the US Census treats Hispanic/Latino as an ethnic category. This table excludes Latinos from the racial categories and assigns them to a separate category. Hispanics/Latinos may be of any race.
Race / Ethnicity (NH = Non-Hispanic)	Pop 1980	Pop 1990	Pop 2000	Pop 2010	Pop 2020	% 1980	% 1990	% 2000	% 2010	% 2020
White alone (NH)	22,427	22,999	27,611	33,538	38,766	72.28%	72.26%	71.27%	70.83%	69.46%
Black or African American alone (NH)	8,111	7,955	9,647	11,155	11,300	26.14%	25.00%	24.90%	23.56%	20.25%
Native American or Alaska Native alone (NH)	13	26	52	87	68	0.04%	0.08%	0.13%	0.18%	0.12%
Asian alone (NH)	168	639	642	1,003	1,685	0.54%	2.01%	1.66%	2.12%	3.02%
Native Hawaiian or Pacific Islander alone (NH)	x	x	5	16	24	x	x	0.01%	0.03%	0.04%
Other race alone (NH)	99	4	56	43	130	0.32%	0.01%	0.14%	0.09%	0.23%
Mixed race or Multiracial (NH)	x	x	304	436	1,698	x	x	0.78%	0.92%	3.04%
Hispanic or Latino (any race)	212	203	427	1,073	2,142	0.68%	0.64%	1.10%	2.27%	3.84%
Total	31,030	31,826	38,744	47,351	55,813	100.00%	100.00%	100.00%	100.00%	100.00%

=== 2020 census ===
As of the 2020 census, the county had a population of 55,813. The median age was 30.2 years. 18.2% of residents were under the age of 18 and 14.1% of residents were 65 years of age or older. For every 100 females there were 92.4 males, and for every 100 females age 18 and over there were 91.1 males age 18 and over.

The racial makeup of the county was 70.4% White, 20.4% Black or African American, 0.2% American Indian and Alaska Native, 3.0% Asian, <0.1% Native Hawaiian and Pacific Islander, 1.7% from some other race, and 4.4% from two or more races. Hispanic or Latino residents of any race comprised 3.8% of the population.

60.1% of residents lived in urban areas, while 39.9% lived in rural areas.

There were 22,362 households in the county, of which 24.6% had children under the age of 18 living in them. Of all households, 38.1% were married-couple households, 25.0% were households with a male householder and no spouse or partner present, and 32.3% were households with a female householder and no spouse or partner present. About 36.7% of all households were made up of individuals and 10.6% had someone living alone who was 65 years of age or older.

There were 28,208 housing units, of which 20.7% were vacant. Among occupied housing units, 56.5% were owner-occupied and 43.5% were renter-occupied. The homeowner vacancy rate was 2.0% and the rental vacancy rate was 18.8%.

=== 2010 Census ===
As of the census of 2010, there were 45,859 people. There were 21,646 housing units. The medium age was 26.8 years old. The racial makeup of the county was 71.5% white, 23.9% Black or African American, 0.3% Native American, and 2.0% Asian. 2.3% of the population were Hispanic or Latino of any race.

=== 2000 Census ===
As of the census of 2000, there were 38,744 people, 14,373 households, and 8,321 families residing in the county. The population density was 61 people per square mile (24 people/km^{2}). There were 16,587 housing units at an average density of 26 units per square mile (10 units/km^{2}). The racial makeup of the county was 71.85% White, 25.05% Black or African American, 0.16% Native American, 1.67% Asian, 0.01% Pacific Islander, 0.42% from other races, and 0.84% from two or more races. 1.10% of the population were Hispanic or Latino of any race.

The largest European ancestry groups in Lafayette county are:

- 13.4% English
- 12.5% Irish
- 9.1% German
- 4.4% Scots-Irish
- 2.8% Scottish
- 1.1% Polish
- 1.0% Welsh

Many people in Mississippi may claim Irish ancestry because of the term "Scots-Irish", but most of the time in Mississippi this term is used for those with Ulster Scots roots rather than Irish Catholics.

In 2000, there were 14,373 households, out of which 26.90% had children under the age of 18 living with them, 43.20% were married couples living together, 11.40% had a female householder with no husband present, and 42.10% were non-families. 29.10% of all households were made up of individuals, and 7.80% had someone living alone who was 65 years of age or older. The average household size was 2.36 and the average family size was 2.97.

In the county, the population was spread out, with 19.50% under the age of 18, 27.10% from 18 to 24, 26.30% from 25 to 44, 17.10% from 45 to 64, and 9.80% who were 65 years of age or older. The median age was 27 years. For every 100 females there were 96.70 males. For every 100 females age 18 and over, there were 94.60 males.

The median income for a household in the county was $28,517, and the median income for a family was $42,910. Males had a median income of $30,964 versus $21,207 for females. The per capita income for the county was $16,406. About 10.20% of families and 21.30% of the population were below the poverty line, including 15.60% of those under age 18 and 19.40% of those age 65 or over.

== Communities ==

=== City ===
- Oxford (county seat and largest municipality)

=== Town ===
- Abbeville
- Taylor

=== Census-designated places ===
- Paris
- Tula
- University

=== Unincorporated communities ===
- Blackwater (partially located in Marshall County)
- Denmark
- Harmontown
- Springdale
- Yocona

=== Ghost towns ===
- Dogtown
- Orwood
- Riverside
- Wyatt

== Politics ==
Unlike many counties dominated by college towns, Lafayette County tilts Republican. It last supported a Democrat for president in 1980, though Southerner Bill Clinton came within less than 2% of winning it in both of his successful runs in 1992 and 1996. However, it is not as heavily Republican as other counties in north Mississippi, particularly those in the Memphis area. The Democrats have received at least 40 percent of the vote in every election since 1988, a period when much of north Mississippi swung hard to the GOP, except for 2024.

United States presidential election results for Lafayette County, Mississippi
Year	Republican		Democratic		Third party(ies)	
Year	No.	%	No.	%	No.	%
1912	28	2.63%	973	91.28%	65	6.10%
1916	47	3.29%	1,370	95.80%	13	0.91%
1920	321	26.62%	873	72.39%	12	1.00%
1924	89	4.51%	1,848	93.62%	37	1.87%
1928	131	7.35%	1,652	92.65%	0	0.00%
1932	26	1.40%	1,831	98.39%	4	0.21%
1936	26	1.54%	1,652	98.16%	5	0.30%
1940	65	2.88%	2,188	97.03%	2	0.09%
1944	87	3.89%	2,148	96.11%	0	0.00%
1948	48	2.42%	744	37.58%	1,188	60.00%
1952	868	26.86%	2,363	73.14%	0	0.00%
1956	575	21.29%	1,968	72.86%	158	5.85%
1960	705	24.13%	1,308	44.76%	909	31.11%
1964	3,202	81.64%	720	18.36%	0	0.00%
1968	1,235	20.11%	1,578	25.69%	3,329	54.20%
1972	5,391	76.89%	1,545	22.04%	75	1.07%
1976	3,735	44.73%	4,375	52.39%	241	2.89%
1980	4,366	45.62%	4,887	51.06%	318	3.32%
1984	6,006	62.05%	3,646	37.67%	28	0.29%
1988	5,841	59.29%	3,967	40.27%	44	0.45%
1992	5,251	46.07%	5,224	45.84%	922	8.09%
1996	4,753	47.18%	4,646	46.12%	675	6.70%
2000	7,081	55.85%	5,139	40.53%	458	3.61%
2004	9,004	58.51%	6,218	40.41%	166	1.08%
2008	10,278	55.68%	7,997	43.32%	185	1.00%
2012	11,075	56.78%	8,091	41.48%	339	1.74%
2016	10,872	55.35%	7,969	40.57%	802	4.08%
2020	12,949	55.28%	10,070	42.99%	404	1.72%
2024	14,050	60.02%	8,956	38.26%	403	1.72%

== Law enforcement ==
Lafayette County Sheriff's Department
- Common name: Lafayette County Sheriff
- Abbreviation: LCSD
- Motto: "Protect and Serve"

Agency overview
- Formed: 1836
- Employees: 26

Jurisdictional structure
- Governing body: Lafayette County Board of Supervisors
- General nature: Local civilian police

Operational structure
- Headquarters: 711 Jackson Avenue East, Oxford, MS 38655
- Deputys: 26 (2014)

Facilities
- Districts: Oxford, Mississippi

Website
- lafayettems.com/us/elected-officials/sheriff/

The Lafayette County Sheriff's Department is the law enforcement agency responsible for the policing and maintenance of public order of Lafayette County, Mississippi. They are also the primary law enforcement agency for all locales excluding Oxford, and work in tandem with the Oxford Police Department and The University of Mississippi's University Police Department in those jurisdictions. Responsible for maintenance and administration of its jail, the Lafayette County Detention Center in Oxford, it is also their duty to stand as guards of Lafayette County's County and Chancery Courts. In September 2018 the department employed 26 full-time deputies, in addition to other staff employed as guards for the county jail. In comparison, Oxford Police Department, which patrols a small fraction of the area done by the Sheriff's Department, employs over 75 full-time officers.

F.D. "Buddy" East was the long-time sheriff, who held the office from 1972 until his death in September 2018, having been elected to twelve terms as sheriff. At the time he was the longest serving Sheriff in the history of the United States, having held the position for 46 years. The sheriff's son, Joey East, was concurrently the Oxford Police Department's Chief of Police. After the November 2019 elections, Joey East became the sheriff of Lafayette County, following his father.

== Education ==
School districts include Lafayette County School District and Oxford School District.

University of Mississippi is in the county.

Northwest Mississippi Community College operates the Lafayette-Yalobusha Technical Center.

== See also ==
- List of places named for the Marquis de Lafayette
- National Register of Historic Places listings in Lafayette County, Mississippi
