= Taylor, Mississippi =

- Town
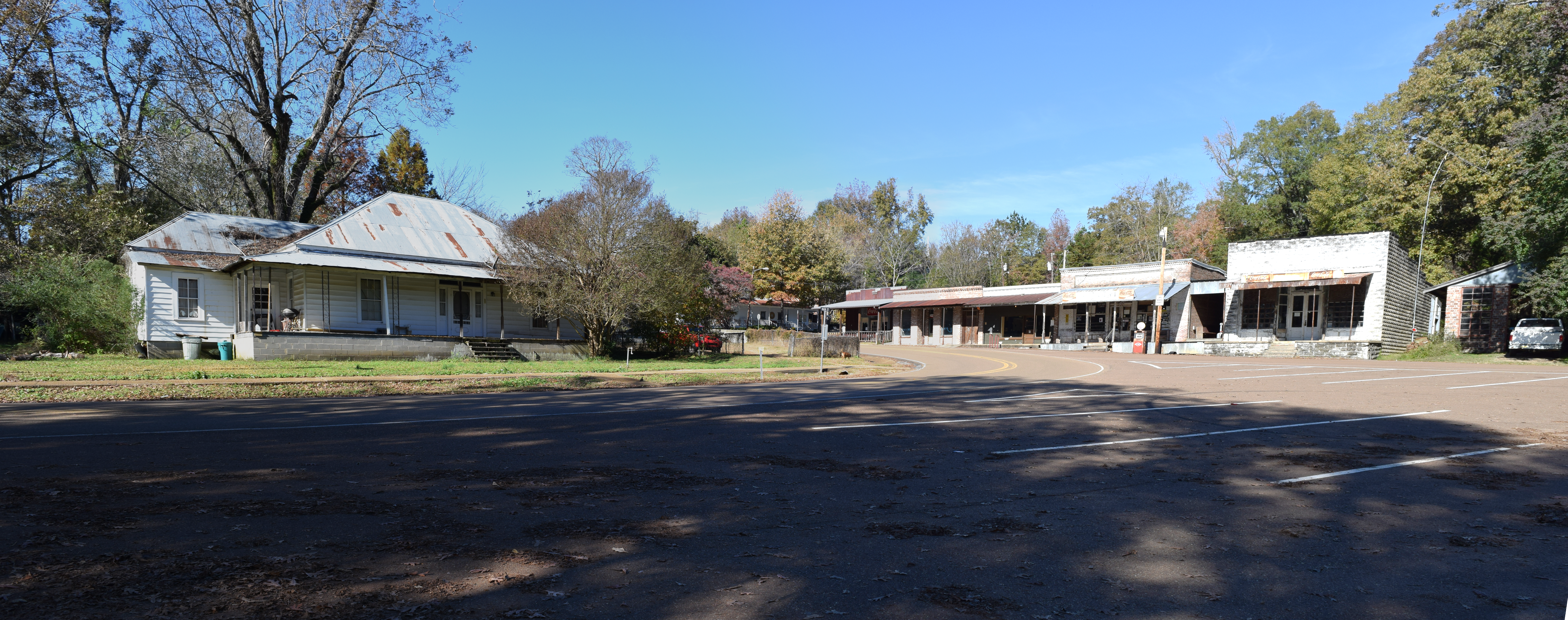
- Main Street in Taylor

- Location of Taylor, Mississippi

- Location in the United States
- Coordinates: 34°16′09″N 89°35′00″W
- Country: United States
- State: Mississippi
- County: Lafayette

Area
  - Total: 2.93 sq mi (7.60 km^{2})
  - Land: 2.93 sq mi (7.59 km^{2})
  - Water: 0.0077 sq mi (0.02 km^{2})
- Elevation: 295 ft (90 m)

Population (2020)
  - Total: 355
  - Density: 121.2/sq mi (46.79/km^{2})
- Time zone: UTC-6 (Central (CST))
  - Summer (DST): UTC-5 (CDT)
- ZIP code: 38673
- Area code: 662
- FIPS code: 28-72360
- GNIS feature ID: 2407559
- Website: www.taylorms.org

Taylor is a town in Lafayette County, Mississippi, United States. The population was 322 at the 2010 census.

== Geography ==
According to the United States Census Bureau, the town has a total area of 4.1 square miles (11 km^{2}), of which 4.1 square miles (11 km^{2}) is land and 0.24% is water.

== Demographics ==
Historical population
Census	Pop.	Note	%±
1880	85		—
1900	101		—
1910	147		45.5%
1920	209		42.2%
1930	169		−19.1%
1940	164		−3.0%
1950	125		−23.8%
1960	122		−2.4%
1970	92		−24.6%
1980	301		227.2%
1990	288		−4.3%
2000	500		73.6%
2010	322		−35.6%
2020	355		10.2%
U.S. Decennial Census

As of the census of 2000, there were 500 people, 128 households, and 78 families residing in the town. The population density was 70.3 inhabitants per square mile (27.1/km^{2}). There were 138 housing units at an average density of 33.6 per square mile (13.0/km^{2}). The racial makeup of the town was 70.28% White, 25.99% African American, 1.38% Native American and 0.35% Pacific Islander. Hispanic or Latino of any race were 1.73% of the population.

There were 128 households, out of which 21.1% had children under the age of 18 living with them, 53.1% were married couples living together, 7.8% had a female householder with no husband present, and 38.3% were non-families. 35.2% of all households were made up of individuals, and 9.4% had someone living alone who was 65 years of age or older. The average household size was 2.26 and the average family size was 2.87.

In the town, the population was spread out, with 17.3% under the age of 18, 10.0% from 18 to 24, 34.3% from 25 to 44, 23.5% from 45 to 64, and 14.9% who were 65 years of age or older. The median age was 40 years. For every 100 females, there were 95.3 males. For every 100 females age 18 and over, there were 95.9 males.

The median income for a household in the town was $28,875, and the median income for a family was $50,250. Males had a median income of $31,528 versus $20,000 for females. The per capita income for the town was $16,403. About 14.1% of families and 12.2% of the population were below the poverty line, including 15.0% of those under the age of eighteen and 17.1% of those 65 or over.

== Education ==
The Town of Taylor is served by the Lafayette County School District.

== Notable people ==
- L.Q.C. Lamar, agricultural innovator, statesman
