= Shanahan =

Shanahan is a surname of Irish origin.

According to historian C. Thomas Cairney, the O'Shanahans were one of the chiefly families of the Dal gCais or Dalcassians who were a tribe of the Erainn who were the second wave of Celts to settle in Ireland between about 500 and 100 BC.

Notable people with the surname include:

- Bill Shanahan (born 1938), American former football coach
- Brenda Shanahan (politician) (born 1958), Canadian politician
- Brendan Shanahan (born 1969), Canadian ice hockey executive and former player
- Carol Shanahan (born 1957), English businesswoman
- Charif Shanahan, American poet and translator
- Christopher Shanahan (born 1960), Australian barrister
- Dan Shanahan (born 1977), Irish former hurler
- Danny Shanahan (1956–2021), American cartoonist
- David Shanahan (disambiguation), various people
- Dennis Shanahan, Australian journalist and editor
- Doug Shanahan (born 1979), American lacrosse coach and player
- Eileen Shanahan (1901–1979), Irish poet
- Eileen Shanahan (journalist) (1924–2001), American journalist
- Elizabeth Shanahan, American political scientist
- Elwill Shanahan (1912–1983), American politician
- Fergus Shanahan (born 1955), British journalist
- Foss Shanahan (1910–1964), New Zealand diplomat and public servant
- Frank E. Shanahan Jr. (1923–2007), American politician
- Francis Shanahan, Chief Technology Officer of Peloton Interactive
- Greg Shanahan (born 1947), American baseball player
- Greg Shanahan (born 1974), Irish American politician and historian
- Holly Shanahan (born 1981), New Zealand actress
- Jack Shanahan (born 1999), Irish drift driver
- James Shanahan (1920–1997), United States Army Brigadier General
- James Shanahan, birth name of Jamey Jasta (born 1977), American musician
- Jamie Shanahan (born 1967), Australian rules footballer
- Jamie Shanahan (hurler) (born 1994), Irish hurler
- Jennie Shanahan (1897–1936), member of the Irish Citizen Army
- Jeremiah F. Shanahan (1834–1886), American Roman Catholic prelate
- Jesse Shanahan (fl. 2018–2021), American disability activist and astrophysicist
- Jim Shanahan (1901–1985), Australian rules footballer
- Joe Shanahan, American businessman and music industry executive
- John Shanahan (disambiguation), various people
- Joseph (Ignatius) Shanahan (1871–1943), Irish priest, missionary and bishop in Nigeria
- Katie Shanahan (born 2004), British swimmer
- Kid Shanahan (Joseph A. Shanahan, active 1873–1883), river pirate and member of the Patsy Conroy Gang
- Kyle Shanahan (born 1979), American football coach
- Louise Shanahan (born 1997), Irish athlete
- Mark Shanahan, Irish conductor
- Martin Shanahan (born 1973), Irish businessman and public servant
- Martina Shanahan (1965–2021), Irish member of the Winchester Three
- Matt Shanahan (basketball) (born 1976), Australian basketball coach and former player
- Matt Shanahan (politician) (born 1964), Irish independent politician
- Maurice Shanahan (born 1990), Irish hurler, brother of Dan Shanahan
- Megan Shanahan (born 1985), Australian rugby union player
- Melanie Shanahan (1964–2003), Australian folk singer and songwriter
- Mike Shanahan (disambiguation), various people
- Murray Shanahan, professor of cognitive robotics at Imperial College London
- Neil Shanahan (1979–1999), Irish racing driver
- Nicole Shanahan (born 1985), American attorney and reported vice presidential candidate
- Patrick Shanahan (disambiguation), various people
- Paul Shanahan (1948–2011), Australian rules footballer
- Paul Shanahan (hurler), Irish hurler
- Peter Shanahan (born 1946), Australian rules footballer
- Phiala E. Shanahan, Australian theoretical physicist
- Philip Shanahan (1874–1931), Irish Sinn Féin politician
- Phil Shanahan (1928–2012), Irish hurler
- Rebecca Shanahan, Australian artist and photographer
- Rob Shanahan (born 1966), American photographer and rock drummer
- Sean Shanahan (1951–2022), Canadian ice hockey player
- Steve Shanahan (born 1970), Canadian politician
- Terry Shanahan (born 1951), English former footballer
- Thomas Michael Shanahan (1934–2011), American judge
- Timothy Shanahan (disambiguation), various people
- Tom Shanahan (1925–2014), American broadcaster
- William Shanahan (1897–1954), Irish athlete

== See also ==
- Irish clans
- Shanahan Sanitoa (born 1989), American Samoan sprinter
- Stranahan (disambiguation)
