= Grace Glueck =

American arts journalist (1926–2022)

- Born: July 24, 1926; New York City, U.S.
- Died: October 8, 2022 (aged 96); New York City, U.S.
- Education: New York University
- Occupation: Journalist
- Spouse: Milton Freudenheim (m. 2000; died 2022)

Grace Glueck (July 24, 1926 – October 8, 2022) was an American arts journalist. She worked for The New York Times from 1951 until the early 2010s.

== Early life ==
Glueck was born in New York City on July 24, 1926. Her father, Ernest, worked as a municipal bond salesman on Wall Street until the Great Depression and subsequently became an insurance broker; her mother, Mignon (Schwarz), was a housewife who wrote in community papers. Glueck was raised in Rockville Centre, where she attended high school. She then studied English at New York University, graduating in 1948. During her studies there, she was the editor of The Apprentice, the school's literary magazine.

== Career ==
Glueck first joined The New York Times as a copy girl in 1951. After carrying out administrative assignments for two years, she became picture researcher with the Times Book Review for 11 years, having been dissuaded by a senior editor from becoming a reporter due to her sex. She was eventually given her own art column – "Art People" – in the Sunday paper by Lester Markel, who took notice after she found a Balthus image of a lolita to go with a review of Lolita in 1963. Shortly after she began writing "Art People", Glueck also became an arts reporter, critic, and art news editor for the paper. In that capacity, she interviewed Marcel Duchamp (1965) and Georgia O'Keeffe (1970). She also reviewed art by Francis Hines, Cynthia Carlson, Joseph Glasco, George Grosz, Max Weber, Oscar Florianus Bluemner, Mike Kelley, Robert Arneson, Jackie Ferrara, Ad Reinhardt, Joel Meyerowitz, Lucas Samaras, Aldo Tambellini, and Carmen Herrera, among others.

After learning that the Times was not promoting women to the top editorial positions in 1969, Glueck wrote a note to Arthur Ochs Sulzberger, ending with: "Why were no women included?" This ultimately led to a class-action lawsuit against the paper five years later, filed by eight of her female colleagues alleging sex discrimination in contravention of the Civil Rights Act of 1964. The "attractive brunette" comment made to Glueck during her first interview with the Times was led as evidence. The case concluded in 1978 with a court settlement, in which the Times acquiesced to hiring more women across the corporate hierarchy and establishing annuities to compensate for "delayed career advancement or denied opportunity". The leading plaintiff, Eileen Shanahan, credited Glueck for her role, stating: "Without Grace there would have been no lawsuit".

Glueck was the co-author, with Paul Gardner, of Brooklyn: People and Places, Past and Present (1991) and New York: The Painted City (1992). She also wrote for The New Criterion, and the Los Angeles Review of Books.

== Personal life, death, and legacy ==
Glueck married Milt Freudenheim, a fellow Times reporter, in October 2000. They remained married until his death in January 2022. They did not have children together, with Freudenheim having four children from his previous marriage.

Glueck died on October 8, 2022, at her home on the Upper West Side of Manhattan. She was 96 years old.

She was lauded with lush praise, both for her lawsuit that opened the newsrooms to women and her writing and mentoring on her death, by numerous fellow writers, included the Pace Press, ArtNews, and the Clemente Course.
