= Susanna McBee =

American politics journalist born 1934

Susanna McBee is an American journalist known for her coverage of United States national politics for outlets including the Washington Post and Hearst, and for her 1968 exposé on diet pills in Life.

== Early life and education ==
Susanna McBee is from Santa Fe, New Mexico. She attended John Marshall High School in Los Angeles, and won a city-wide award for liberal arts. She studied journalism at the University of Southern California, where she was a member of Phi Beta Kappa and Phi Kappa Phi, and served as the first female editor of the Daily Trojan newspaper. She graduated summa cum laude with an A.B. in journalism.

== Career ==
In 1956, she started as a news aide at The Washington Post, where she worked for five years. She enrolled in the University of Chicago, where she studied constitutional law as a Falk Fellow, earning a Master’s in political science.

McBee worked at several magazines, including as editor of Washingtonian, editor of McCall's for three years, and as Washington correspondent for LIFE for four years. Her 1968 exposé of diet pill industry in LIFE led to her winning the Penney Missouri Magazine Award and the Sigma Delta Chi Award.

She returned to the Washington Post, where she worked for more than fifteen years total, first as a national news writer and then as an editor from 1973 to 1979.

=== Nomination for national ===
In April 1979, it was announced that Jimmy Carter was expected to nominate McBee as assistant secretary for public affairs in the Department of Health, Education, and Welfare, replacing Eileen Shanahan who was joining The Washington Star. McBee sold her stock in the Washington Post upon taking the job. She started in the role on April 30, which had a $50,000 annual salary and involved her to serve as press secretary work for the department head, Joseph A. Califano.

However, Secretary Califano was fired in July, shortly before McBee's scheduled confirmation hearing before the Senate Finance Committee on July 24. His successor already had a press secretary, and McBee decided to leave the department.

=== Further journalism career ===
In June 1981, she was named associate editor for U.S. News and World Report, and in 1986, she became the Washington, D.C. bureau editor for Hearst News.

== Personal life ==
McBee married science writer Paul Recer, who worked as a science writer for the Associated Press. from 1987 to 2004. She has two stepdaughters through Recer.
