= Mike Shanahan (disambiguation) =

Mike Shanahan (born 1952) is a former American football coach.

Mike Shanahan may also refer to:

- Mike Shanahan (ice hockey) (1939–2018), investor and owner of the American hockey franchise, the St. Louis Blues
- Mike Shanahan (tight end) (born 1989), American football tight end and coach
- Mike Shanahan (writer), British biologist and writer
- Michael Shanahan (journalist) (1943–2014), American journalist
- Michael Shanahan (Australian Army officer) (1870–1964)
