= James H. Piles =

Mississippi state legislator

- Born: c. 1842; Springfield, Ohio
- Occupations: African-American lawyer and state legislator in Mississippi

James H. Piles was an African-American teacher, school principal, lawyer, and state legislator in Mississippi.

He was born c. 1842 in Springfield, Ohio, and before attending Oberlin College, worked as a barber. He left Mississippi after Reconstruction ended and worked in Washington, D.C., and Memphis, Tennessee.

He represented Panola County in the Mississippi House of Representatives from 1870 to 1875 as a Republican. He served as Assistant Secretary of State in 1875.

== See also ==
- African American officeholders from the end of the Civil War until before 1900
