= 1960 United States presidential election in Mississippi =

- November 8, 1960
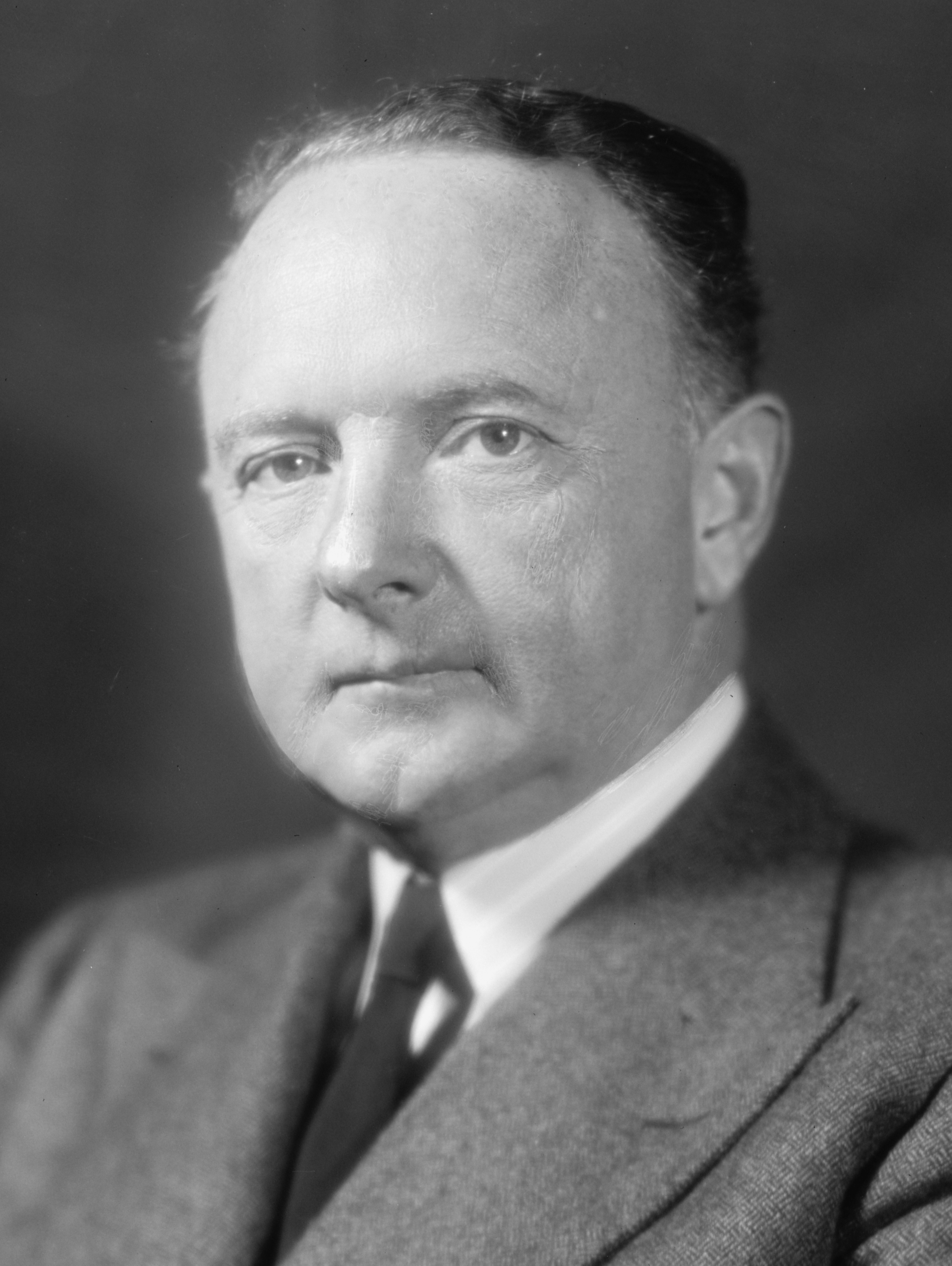

Nominee	Harry F. Byrd (by unpledged electors)	John F. Kennedy	Richard Nixon
Party	Southern Democrat	Democratic	Republican
Home state	Virginia	Massachusetts	California
Running mate	Strom Thurmond	Lyndon B. Johnson	Henry Cabot Lodge Jr.
Electoral vote	8	0	0
Popular vote	116,248	108,362	73,561
Percentage	38.99%	36.34%	24.67%

Unpledged
30–40%
40–50%
50–60%
60–70%
70–80%
Kennedy
30–40%
40–50%
50–60%
60–70%
Nixon
30–40%
40–50%
President before election
Dwight D. Eisenhower
Republican
Elected President
John F. Kennedy
Democratic

The 1960 United States presidential election in Mississippi took place on November 8, 1960, as part of the 1960 United States presidential election. Voters chose eight representatives, or electors to the Electoral College, who voted for president and vice president. This was the last election in which Mississippi had eight electoral votes: the Great Migration of Black Americans caused the state to lose congressional districts for the third time in four censuses before the next election.

The election saw the only case of a state being carried by a slate of unpledged electors. Mississippi voted narrowly for this slate, who voted unanimously for long-time Virginia Senator and political machine director Harry Flood Byrd, over the national Democratic nominee, Senator John F. Kennedy of Massachusetts. Republican nominee and outgoing Vice President Richard Nixon, from California, came in third, with his percentage of the vote practically unchanged from what outgoing President Dwight D. Eisenhower recorded in 1956.

Governor Ross Barnett, a segregationist, was faced with a severe dilemma upon becoming governor at the beginning of the year owing to the rigid opposition of Mississippi's limited and almost exclusively White electorate to the active Civil Rights Movement. Pressured by the "Citizens' Council" who wished to unite the South behind a White-supremacist Democratic candidate, Governor Barnett repeated James P. Coleman’s strategy from 1956 and nominated two sets of Democratic Party electors for the presidential ballot. The first slate was pledged to Kennedy, while the other was not pledged to any candidate. The aim of placing unpledged electors on the ballot was to gain leverage from either major party in a close election, with the possibility of the House of Representatives electing a candidate more favourable to opponents of Brown v. Board of Education than either national major party nominee.

Because the civil rights movement’s supporters regarded Kennedy’s record as poor on this issue, Senators John C. Stennis and James Eastland supported his candidacy, although state-level politicians were not at all supportive. The state’s media saw a vigorous debate between the loyalist and unpledged Democrats in the week before the election. Outside heavily French-settled Hancock County, which has greater cultural ties with Louisiana than with most of the rest of Mississippi, Kennedy’s Catholic faith was also considered suspect.

== Campaign ==
=== Predictions ===
Source	Ranking	As of
The Philadelphia Inquirer	Tilt I (Flip)	October 3, 1960
Knoxville News Sentinel	Tossup	October 23, 1960
Daily News	Likely D	October 28, 1960
The Daily Item	Tilt D	November 4, 1960
The Clarion-Ledger	Tilt D	November 7, 1960
Hattiesburg American	Lean D	November 7, 1960

== Results ==
1960 United States presidential election in Mississippi
Party	Candidate	Votes	Percentage	Electoral votes
Unpledged Electors	—	116,248	38.99%	8
Democratic	John F. Kennedy	108,362	36.34%	0
Republican	Richard Nixon	73,561	24.67%	0
Totals		298,171	100.00%	8

=== Results by county ===
County	Unpledged Electors Democratic		John F. Kennedy Democratic		Richard Nixon Republican		Margin		Total votes cast
County	#	%	#	%	#	%	#	%	Total votes cast
Adams	2,526	48.53%	1,452	27.90%	1,227	23.57%	1,074	20.63%	5,205
Alcorn	601	13.43%	3,054	68.25%	820	18.32%	2,234 (Note: In this county where the unpledged slate did finish third behind both Kennedy and Nixon, margin given is Kennedy vote minus Nixon vote and percentage margin Kennedy percentage minus Nixon percentage.)	49.93%	4,475
Amite	1,655	72.72%	338	14.85%	283	12.43%	1,317	57.87%	2,276
Attala	1,281	39.20%	1,337	40.91%	650	19.89%	-56	-1.71%	3,268
Benton	348	31.90%	568	52.06%	175	16.04%	-220	-20.16%	1,091
Bolivar	1,638	43.46%	1,119	29.69%	1,012	26.85%	519	13.77%	3,769
Calhoun	1,299	53.09%	765	31.26%	383	15.65%	534	21.83%	2,447
Carroll	840	57.07%	425	28.87%	207	14.06%	415	28.20%	1,472
Chickasaw	1,362	53.66%	791	31.17%	385	15.17%	571	22.49%	2,538
Choctaw	584	35.48%	817	49.64%	245	14.88%	-233	-14.16%	1,646
Claiborne	651	62.84%	205	19.79%	180	17.37%	446	43.05%	1,036
Clarke	1,478	44.68%	1,244	37.61%	586	17.71%	234	7.07%	3,308
Clay	1,295	54.60%	626	26.39%	451	19.01%	669	28.21%	2,372
Coahoma	1,385	35.82%	1,386	35.84%	1,096	28.34%	-1	-0.02%	3,867
Copiah	1,957	54.15%	896	24.79%	761	21.06%	1,061	29.36%	3,614
Covington	985	44.81%	842	38.31%	371	16.88%	143	6.50%	2,198
DeSoto	734	35.25%	795	38.18%	553	26.56%	-61	-2.93%	2,082
Forrest	3,152	36.52%	2,068	23.96%	3,412	39.53%	260 (Note: In this county where Kennedy ran third behind both Nixon and the unpledged slate, margin given is Nixon vote minus unpledged vote and percentage margin Nixon percentage minus unpledged percentage.)	3.01%	8,632
Franklin	1,115	66.37%	441	26.25%	124	7.38%	674	40.12%	1,680
George	917	44.28%	844	40.75%	310	14.97%	73	3.53%	2,071
Greene	781	49.49%	550	34.85%	247	15.65%	231	14.64%	1,578
Grenada	1,132	48.31%	529	22.58%	682	29.11%	450	19.20%	2,343
Hancock	502	14.97%	2,132	63.58%	719	21.44%	1,413	42.14%	3,353
Harrison	2,621	15.64%	8,961	53.47%	5,177	30.89%	3,784	22.58%	16,759
Hinds	12,094	41.72%	5,811	20.05%	11,083	38.23%	1,011	3.49%	28,988
Holmes	1,484	57.81%	628	24.46%	455	17.72%	856	33.35%	2,567
Humphreys	732	51.48%	459	32.28%	231	16.24%	273	19.20%	1,422
Issaquena	181	42.79%	178	42.08%	64	15.13%	3	0.71%	423
Itawamba	653	23.57%	1,752	63.23%	366	13.21%	-1,099	-39.66%	2,771
Jackson	1,908	20.80%	5,000	54.50%	2,266	24.70%	2,734	29.80%	9,174
Jasper	926	38.03%	1,147	47.10%	362	14.87%	-221	-9.07%	2,435
Jefferson	728	66.54%	229	20.93%	137	12.52%	499	45.61%	1,094
Jefferson Davis	988	57.34%	510	29.60%	225	13.06%	478	27.74%	1,723
Jones	2,928	27.81%	4,871	46.27%	2,729	25.92%	-1,943	-18.46%	10,528
Kemper	587	34.31%	931	54.41%	193	11.28%	-344	-20.10%	1,711
Lafayette	909	31.11%	1,308	44.76%	705	24.13%	-399	-13.65%	2,922
Lamar	1,046	44.83%	651	27.90%	636	27.26%	395	16.93%	2,333
Lauderdale	4,154	38.66%	3,755	34.95%	2,836	26.39%	399	3.71%	10,745
Lawrence	923	55.91%	469	28.41%	259	15.69%	454	27.50%	1,651
Leake	2,011	61.88%	953	29.32%	286	8.80%	1,058	32.56%	3,250
Lee	1,438	21.65%	3,653	55.01%	1,550	23.34%	2,103	31.67%	6,641
Leflore	2,112	45.51%	1,212	26.12%	1,317	28.38%	795	17.13%	4,641
Lincoln	2,185	44.73%	1,449	29.66%	1,251	25.61%	736	15.07%	4,885
Lowndes	1,430	30.56%	1,240	26.50%	2,010	42.95%	580	12.39%	4,680
Madison	1,583	55.33%	753	26.32%	525	18.35%	830	29.01%	2,861
Marion	1,265	41.54%	1,082	35.53%	698	22.92%	183	6.01%	3,045
Marshall	700	39.22%	681	38.15%	404	22.63%	19	1.07%	1,785
Monroe	1,559	32.08%	1,901	39.12%	1,400	28.81%	-342	-7.04%	4,860
Montgomery	761	38.65%	623	31.64%	585	29.71%	138	7.01%	1,969
Neshoba	1,716	41.49%	1,840	44.49%	580	14.02%	-124	-3.00%	4,136
Newton	1,956	57.94%	912	27.01%	508	15.05%	1,044	30.93%	3,376
Noxubee	870	58.43%	277	18.60%	342	22.97%	528	35.46%	1,489
Oktibbeha	1,672	48.95%	915	26.79%	829	24.27%	757	22.16%	3,416
Panola	1,404	48.61%	841	29.12%	643	22.26%	563	19.49%	2,888
Pearl River	1,556	44.67%	1,276	36.64%	651	18.69%	280	8.03%	3,483
Perry	556	41.37%	514	38.24%	274	20.39%	42	3.13%	1,344
Pike	2,632	49.13%	1,258	23.48%	1,467	27.38%	1,165	21.75%	5,357
Pontotoc	792	29.29%	1,584	58.58%	328	12.13%	-792	-29.29%	2,704
Prentiss	468	15.68%	1,777	59.53%	740	24.79%	1,037	34.74%	2,985
Quitman	674	43.32%	583	37.47%	299	19.22%	91	5.85%	1,556
Rankin	3,114	65.12%	850	17.77%	818	17.11%	2,264	47.35%	4,782
Scott	1,841	53.02%	1,024	29.49%	607	17.48%	817	23.53%	3,472
Sharkey	431	42.80%	263	26.12%	313	31.08%	118	11.72%	1,007
Simpson	1,568	48.88%	1,034	32.23%	606	18.89%	534	16.65%	3,208
Smith	1,025	34.79%	1,568	53.22%	353	11.98%	-543	-18.43%	2,946
Stone	818	56.96%	343	23.89%	275	19.15%	475	33.07%	1,436
Sunflower	1,241	35.96%	1,033	29.93%	1,177	34.11%	64	1.85%	3,451
Tallahatchie	1,421	54.72%	830	31.96%	346	13.32%	591	22.76%	2,597
Tate	845	47.69%	686	38.71%	241	13.60%	159	8.98%	1,772
Tippah	467	16.15%	1,939	67.05%	486	16.80%	1,453	50.25%	2,892
Tishomingo	669	27.56%	1,222	50.35%	536	22.08%	-553	-22.79%	2,427
Tunica	240	26.76%	323	36.01%	334	37.24%	-11	-1.23%	897
Union	689	20.91%	2,001	60.73%	605	18.36%	-1,312	-39.82%	3,295
Walthall	1,082	50.58%	747	34.92%	310	14.49%	335	15.66%	2,139
Warren	2,021	30.68%	2,289	34.75%	2,277	34.57%	12	0.18%	6,587
Washington	1,258	18.90%	3,105	46.66%	2,292	34.44%	813	12.22%	6,655
Wayne	1,036	46.39%	707	31.66%	490	21.94%	329	14.73%	2,233
Webster	1,174	57.95%	553	27.30%	299	14.76%	621	30.65%	2,026
Wilkinson	832	68.09%	216	17.68%	174	14.24%	616	50.41%	1,222
Winston	1,505	50.74%	1,056	35.60%	405	13.65%	449	15.14%	2,966
Yalobusha	704	36.99%	650	34.16%	549	28.85%	54	2.83%	1,903
Yazoo	1,847	55.30%	715	21.41%	778	23.29%	1,069	32.01%	3,340
Totals	116,248	38.99%	108,362	36.34%	73,561	24.67%	7,886	2.65%	298,171

==== Counties that flipped from Democratic to Unpledged ====
- Adams
- Amite
- Carroll
- Calhoun
- Chickasaw
- Clay
- Claiborne
- Covington
- Copiah
- Clarke
- Franklin
- Grenada
- George
- Greene
- Hinds
- Issaquena
- Jefferson
- Jefferson Davis
- Lauderdale
- Lamar
- Lawrence
- Leake
- LeFlore
- Lincoln
- Marion
- Marshall
- Montgomery
- Panola
- Noxubee
- Newton
- Oktibbeha
- Pearl River
- Perry
- Pike
- Quitman
- Rankin
- Scott
- Stone
- Simpson
- Sunflower
- Tallahatchie
- Tate
- Walthall
- Yalobusha
- Winston
- Wayne
- Webster

==== Counties that flipped from Republican to Democratic ====
- Hancock
- Warren

==== Counties that flipped from Democratic to Republican ====
- Lowndes
- Tunica

==== Counties that flipped from Republican to Unpledged ====
- Madison

== Analysis ==
In the coastal counties, Kennedy improved considerably upon what Adlai Stevenson II achieved in 1956, but except for those counties around the cities of Natchez and Vicksburg, Kennedy otherwise showed a major decline from the Democratic result in 1956. Kennedy held up best in the poor White upcountry counties that had historically been much more anti-Catholic than the Black Belt, suggesting that voters throughout the state had become more suspicious of the Democrats’ civil rights policies. Since the Republican percentage of the vote essentially failed to change – Nixon lost Hancock and Warren to Kennedy and Adams to the unpledged slate but picked up Tunica and Lowndes Counties – the unpledged slate took almost all of Kennedy's lost votes and thus shaded him for the state overall. Mississippi was one of six states that swung toward Republicans compared to 1956, alongside Alabama, Georgia, Oklahoma, South Carolina, and Tennessee.

Despite Kennedy's statewide defeat being only the second for a national Democrat in Mississippi since Reconstruction, this remains the last election when the coastal, French-influenced counties of Harrison and Jackson have voted for a Democratic presidential nominee. The following landlocked counties have also never voted Democratic since: Choctaw, Jones, and Smith. Warren County would not vote Democratic again until Barack Obama won it in 2012.

== Electoral slates ==
Unpledged electors State Democratic Party	John F. Kennedy and Lyndon B. Johnson National Democratic Party	Richard Nixon and Henry Cabot Lodge Jr. Republican Party
Henry Harris; George Payne Cossar; Charles L. Sullivan; Clay B. Tucker; Earl Evans Jr. Bob Buntin; D. M. Nelson; Lawrence Y. Foote	Frank K. Hughes; David E. Guyton; Will M. Whittington; Frank E. Shanahan Jr. Martin V. B. Miller; Edward H. Stevens; Curtis H. Mullen; Lovie Gore	John M. Kaye; Ralph O. White; J. H. Snyder; J. J. Newman; George W. Shaw; C. E. Tolar; Noel Womack Jr. J. B. Snyder
