= Guilford Vaughan =

American politician

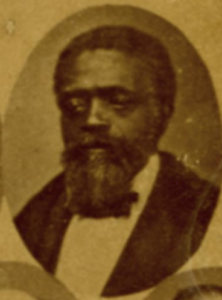

Guilford Vaughan was a state legislator in Mississippi. He represented Panola County, Mississippi in the Mississippi House of Representatives in 1876 and 1877. He was reported to be a Democrat.

== See also ==
- African American officeholders from the end of the Civil War until before 1900
