= Waler =

Breed of horse

Waler horse
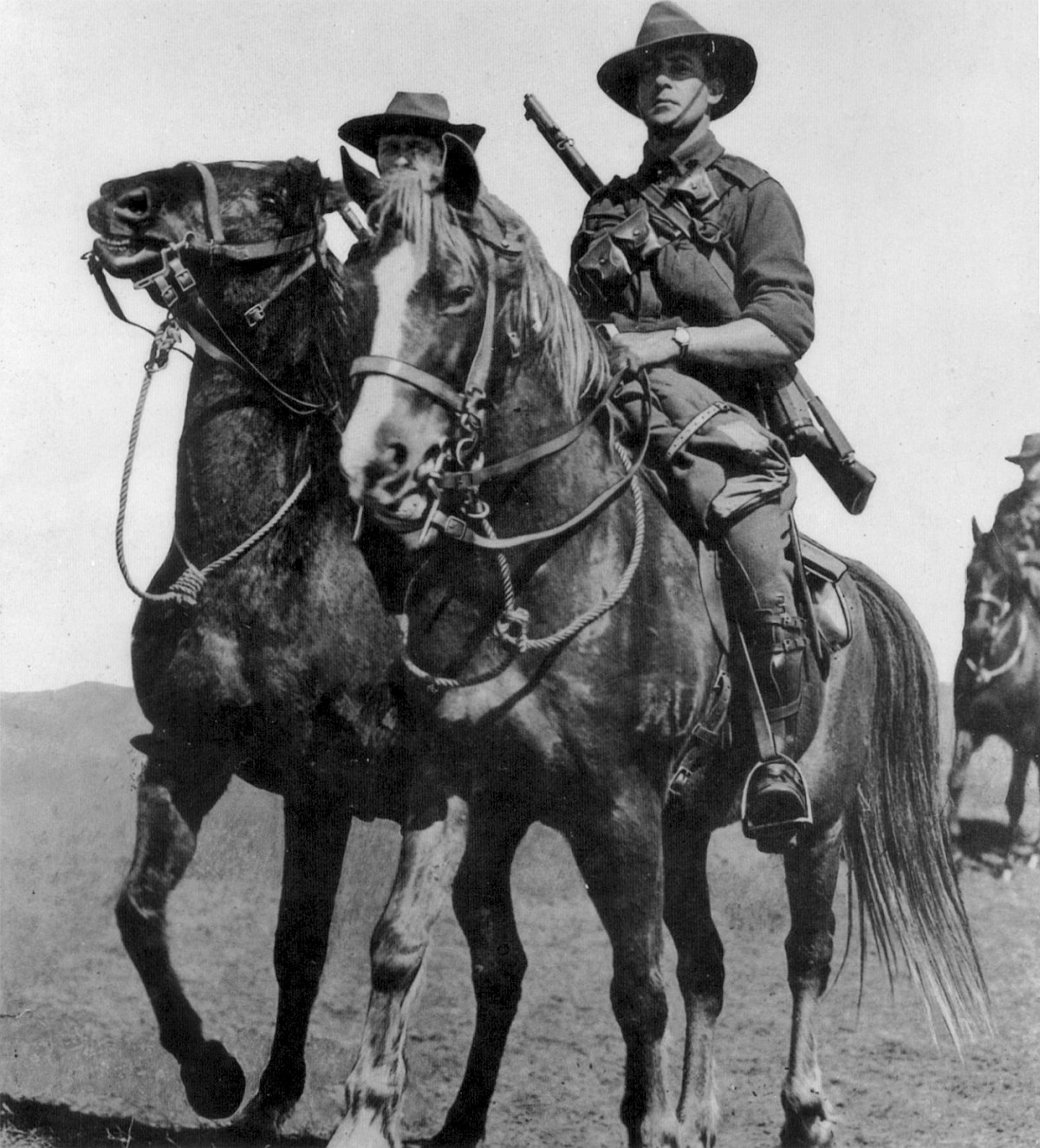
- Australian Light Horse Walers
- Country of origin: Australia

The Waler is an Australian breed of horse that was developed from horses that were brought to the Australian colonies in the 19th century. The name comes from their breeding origins in New South Wales; they were originally known as "New South Walers".

== Origins and characteristics ==
The Waler combined a variety of breeds; particularly the Thoroughbred, Arab, the Cape horse (from the Cape of Good Hope), Timor Pony and perhaps a little Clydesdale or Percheron. It was originally considered only a "type" of horse and not a distinct breed. However, as a landrace bred under the extreme climate and challenging working conditions of Australia, the Waler developed into a hardy horse with great endurance even when under extreme stress from lack of food and water. It was used as a stockman's horse and prized as a military remount. Walers were also used by bushrangers, troopers and exploration expeditions that traversed inland Australia.

The preferred Walers for mounted infantry as distinct from cavalry duties and were 15 to 16 hands high (60 to 64 inches (152 to 163 cm)). Those over 16 hands were rejected for use in the South Australian Bushmen Corps. Unbroken horses, as well as those with grey and broken (spotted) coat colours were also rejected. The selected horses had to be of a good type that could carry sixteen or seventeen stone (102 to 108 kg (224 to 238 lbs)) day after day.

The Walers carried the rider, saddle, saddle cloth, bridle, head collar, lead rope, a horseshoe case with one front and one hind shoe, nails, rations for the horse and rider, a bedroll, change of clothing, a rifle and about 90 rounds of .303 rifle ammunition.

The gaits of the Waler were considered ideal for a mounted infantry as they were a comfortable riding horse; it could maintain a fast walk and could progress directly to a steady, level canter without resorting to a trot which was noisy, liable to dislodge gear and resulted in soreness in the horse's back. The waler horse required docility, courage, speed and athletic ability, as it carried the rider to battle it was not selected to ride into battle ie cavalry but were famously was used in a cavalry style attack sat Bersheba. The infantryman's horse was used as a means of transport from one point to another, for example, from camp to a battle ground, where the horses were kept back from the fighting. Heavier animals were selected and used for draught and packhorse duties.

Most of the early Walers carried a fair percentage of Thoroughbred blood, with some recorded as race winners and a few being registered in the Australian Stud Book. While in warfare service in North Africa, some Walers proved successful in races against local Egyptian horses and assorted Thoroughbreds. In 1919, horses from the ANZAC Mounted Division won five of the six events at Heliopolis, near Cairo.

=== Memorial statue ===
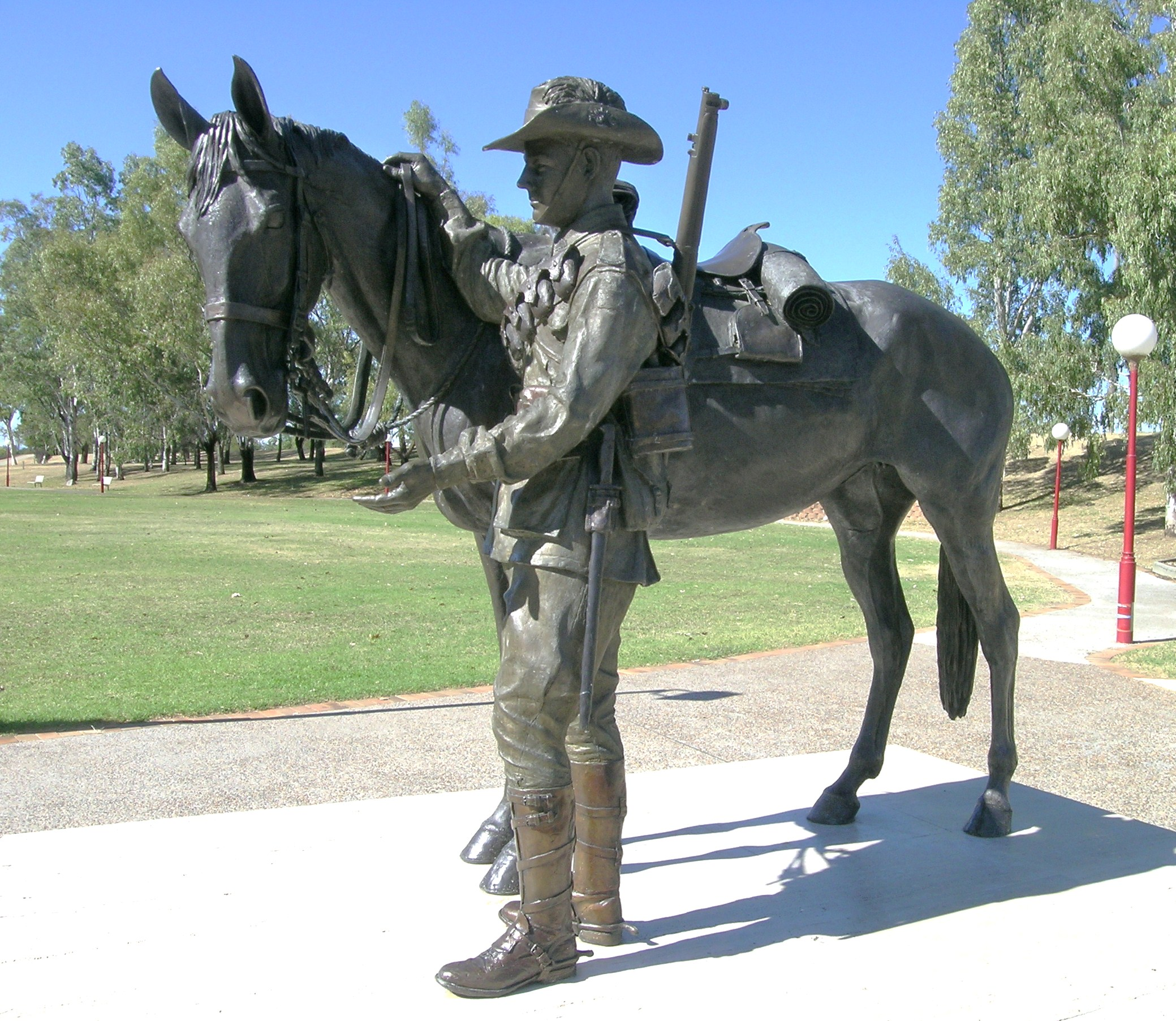
Memorial to the Australian Light Horse, Tamworth, NSW

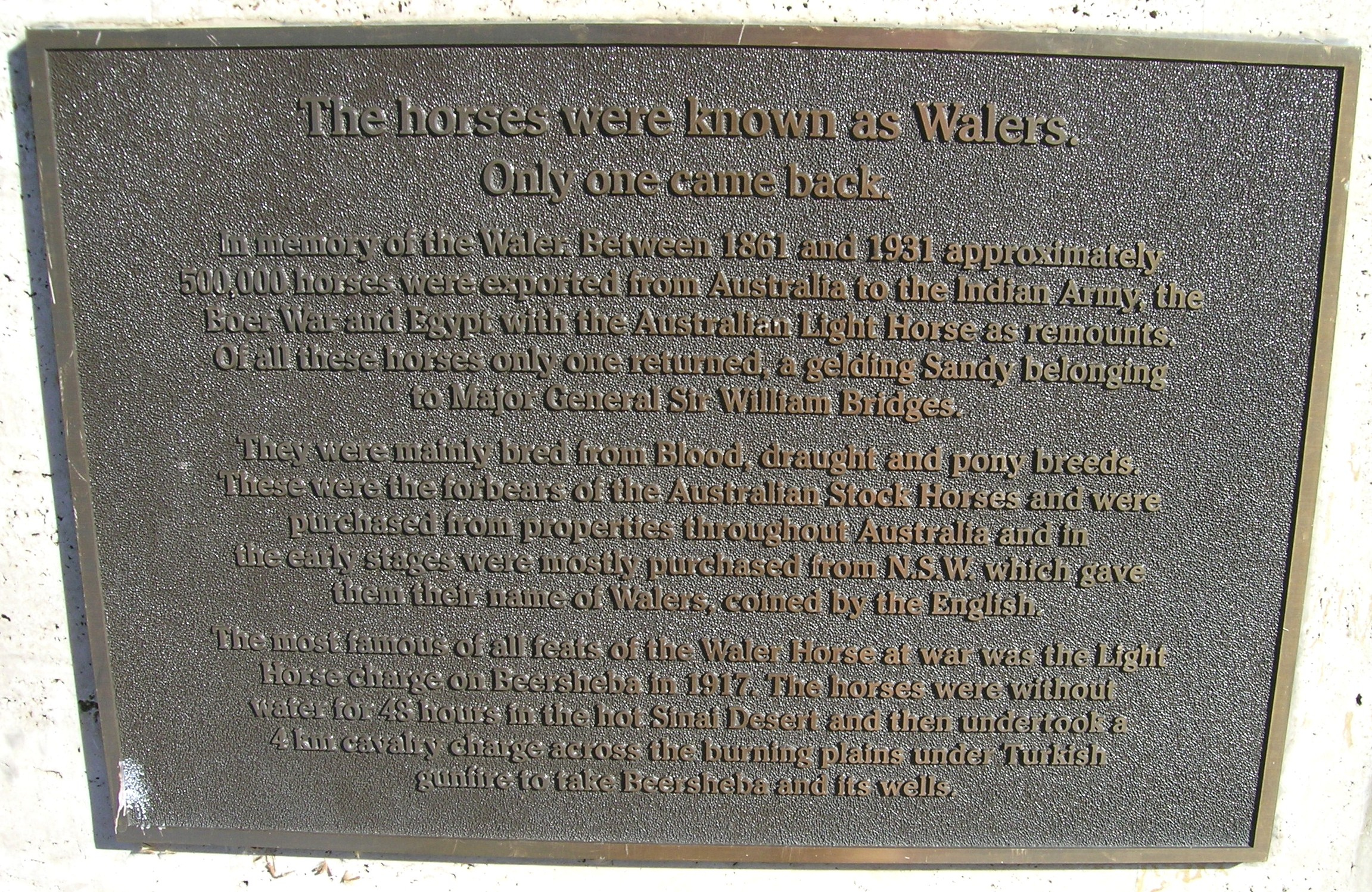
A plaque on the Waler horse memorial, Tamworth, NSW.

A memorial statue to the Waler Light Horse was erected at Tamworth, New South Wales as a tribute to the men of the ANZAC Corps who served in the Boer, Sudan and First World Wars. This memorial was constructed at a cost of $150,000, funded by grants from Federal and State Governments, the Tamworth Regional Council, Joblink Plus and donations from business houses, property owners, RSL Members and the community. It was designed and created by sculptor Tanya Bartlett from Newcastle, New South Wales. The military equipment is identical to that used in the First World War. Forty-seven light horse re-enactment riders and the 12th/16th Hunter River Lancers took part in the unveiling by Major General William B. "Digger" James AC MBE MC (Retd) on 29 October 2005.

== History ==
Australian horses were sent overseas from the 1830s; between the 1840s and 1940s, there was a steady trade in Walers to the British Indian Army.

In Australia's two wars of the early 20th century—the Second Boer War and World War I—the Waler was the backbone of the Australian Light Horse mounted forces. It was especially suited to working in the harsh climate of the Sinai Peninsula and Palestine, where it proved superior to the camel as a means of transporting large bodies of troops.

=== Boer War ===
During the Boer War, Australia dispatched 16,314 horses overseas for use by the Australian Infantry Forces.

=== World War I ===
In the First World War, 121,324 Walers were sent overseas to the allied armies in Africa, Europe, India and Palestine. Of these, 39,348 served with the First Australian Imperial Force, mainly in the Middle East, while 81,976 were sent to India. Due to the costs said to be incurred for "returning horses home" with their mounts and perhaps to a lesser extent, quarantine restrictions, only one Waler is known to have been returned to Australia; "Sandy", the mount of Major-General W. T. Bridges, an officer who died at Gallipoli in May 1915.

The English cavalry officer, Lt. Col. R. M. P. Preston DSO, summed up the Australian Light Horses' performance in his book, The Desert Mounted Corps:

"… (November 16th, 1917) The operations had now continued for 17 days practically without cessation, and a rest was absolutely necessary especially for the horses. Cavalry Division had covered nearly 170 miles…and their horses had been watered on an average of once in every 36 hours…. The heat, too, had been intense and the short rations, 9-1/2 lb of grain per day without bulk food, had weakened them greatly. Indeed, the hardship endured by some horses was almost incredible. One of the batteries of the Australian Mounted Division had only been able to water its horses three times in the last nine days - the actual intervals being 68, 72 and 76 hours respectively. Yet this battery on its arrival had lost only eight horses from exhaustion, not counting those killed in action or evacuated wounded.
… The majority of horses in the Corps were Walers and there is no doubt that these hardy Australian horses make the finest cavalry mounts in the world…. They (the Australians) have got types of compact, well-built, saddle and harness horses that no other part of the world can show. Rather on the light side according to our ideas, but hard as nails and with beautiful clean legs and feet. Their records in this war place them far above the Cavalry horse of any other nation. The Australians themselves can never understand our partiality for the half-bred weight-carrying hunter, which looks to them like a cart horse. Their contention has always been that good blood will carry more weight than big bone, and the experience of this war has converted the writer, for one, entirely to their point of view. It must be remembered that the Australian countrymen are bigger, heavier men than their English brothers. They formed just half the Corps and it probable that they averaged not far off 12 stone each stripped. To this weight must be added another 9-1/2 stone for saddle, ammunition, sword, rifle, clothes and accoutrements, so that each horse carried a weight of 21 stone, all day for every day for 17 days, - on less than half the normal ration of forage and with only one drink in every 36 hours!
The weight-carrying English Hunter had to be nursed back to fitness after these operations and for a long period, while the little Australian horses without any special care, other than good food and plenty of water were soon fit to go through another campaign as arduous as the last one!…."

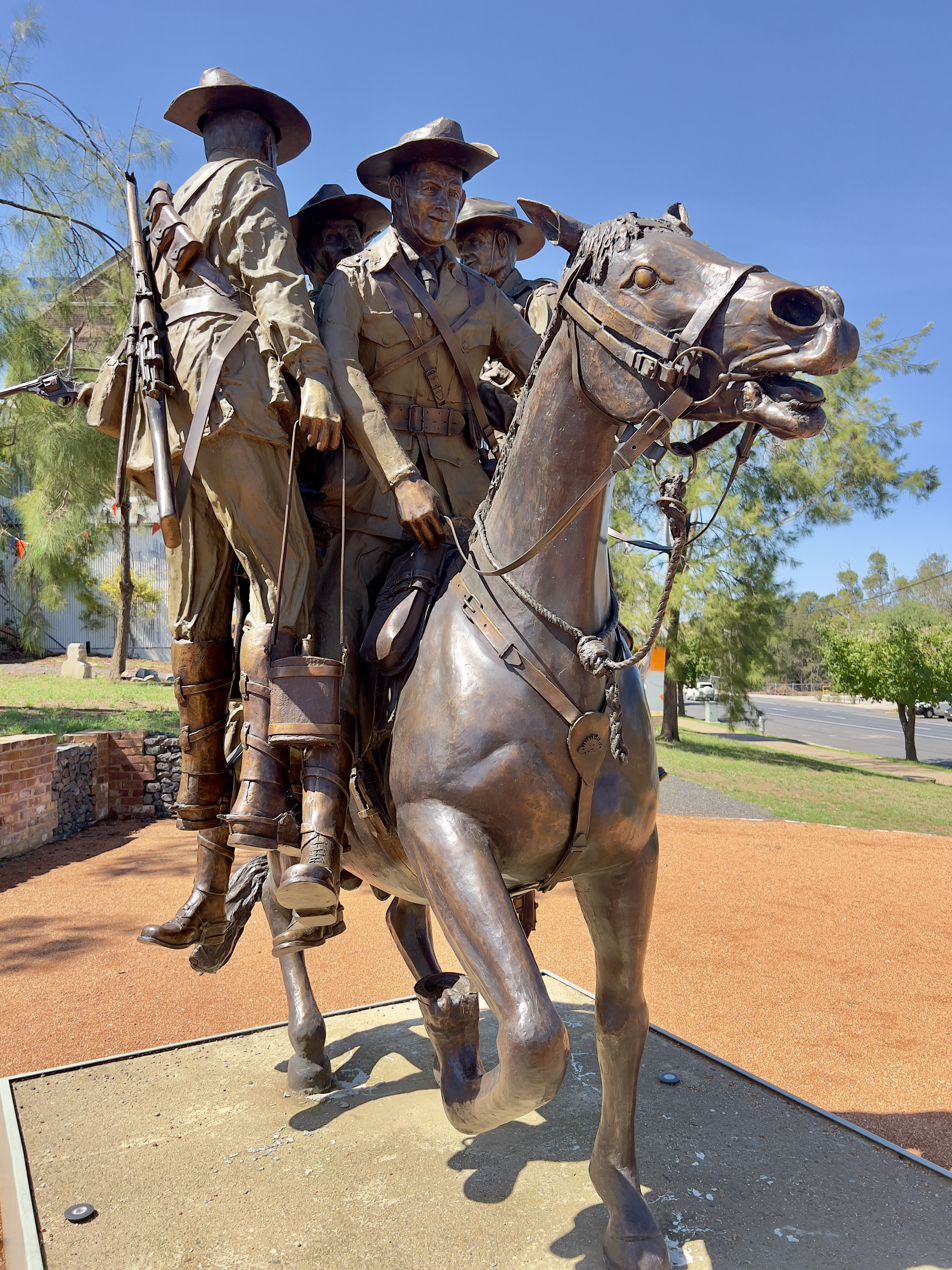
"Bill the Bastard" in Harden, NSW

One well-known Waler was Major Michael Shanahan's mount, "Bill the Bastard", who bucked when asked to gallop. Yet, during World War I, when the major (or captain) found four Australians outflanked by the Turks, "Bill the Bastard" took all five men – three on his back and one on each stirrup – 3/4 mile (1.2 km) through soft sand at a lumbering gallop, without first bucking.

==== Not to return to Australia ====
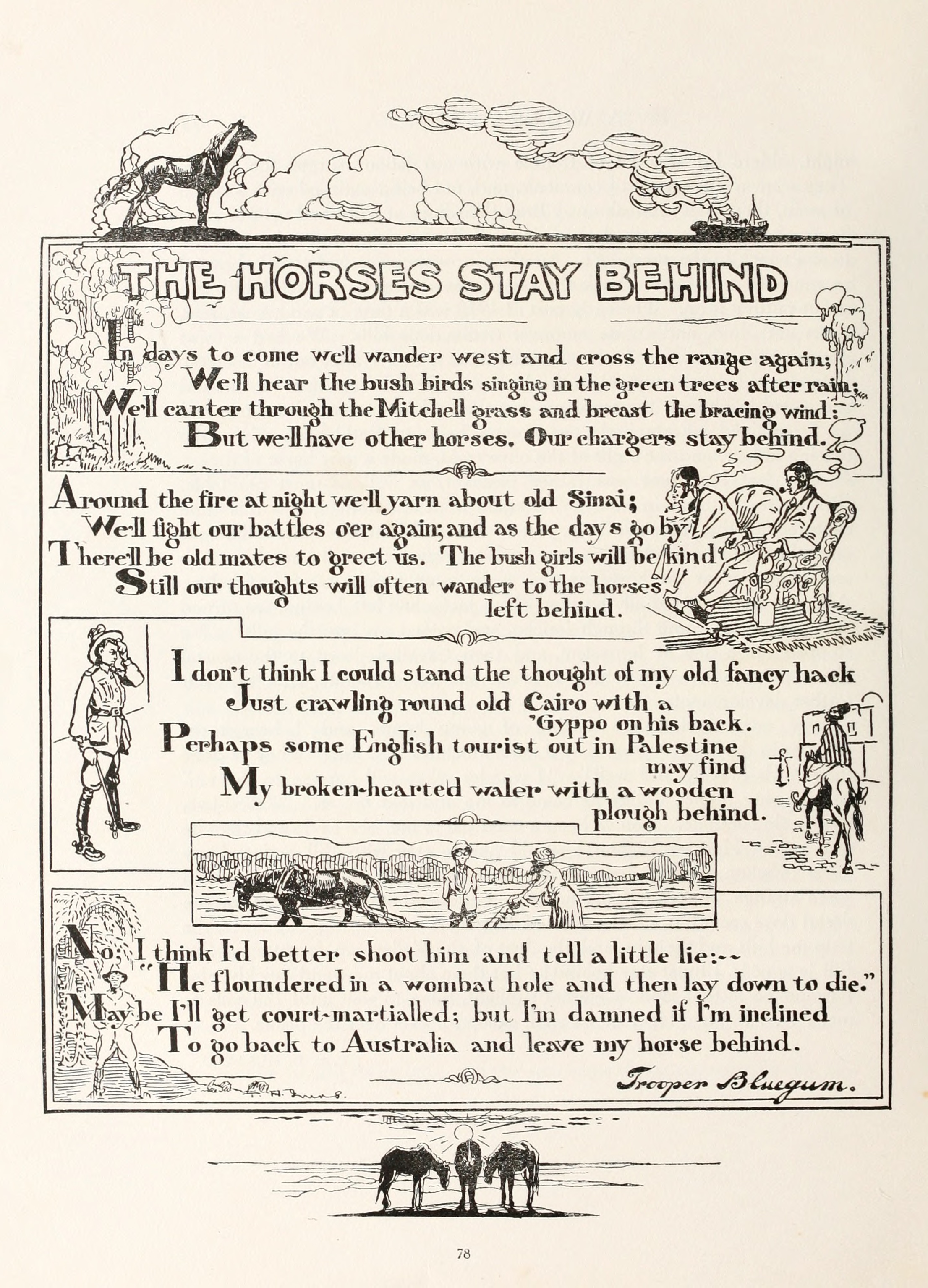
The Horses Stay Behind (Poem), "Trooper Bluegum" (1919).

"Owing to the cost and difficulties of transportation, the military authorities had decided to kill all Light Horse horses over 12 years and dispose of the remainder locally – that would be in Egypt, Palestine, Mesopotamia, or wherever a Light Horse unit happened to be stationed." -- The World's News, 1 February 1919.

At the end of the war, 11,000 surplus horses in the Middle East were sold to the British Army as remounts for Egypt and India. Others, categorised as being unfit, were destroyed. Also, some light horsemen chose to destroy their horses rather than part with them, but this was an exception, despite the popular myth that portrays it as the fate of all the war horses. Parting with their Walers was one of the hardest events the light horsemen had to endure.

A poem by Major Oliver Hogue, 14th Australian Light Horse Regiment ("Trooper Bluegum") sums up the men's sentiment:

I don't think I could stand the thought of my old fancy hack
Just crawling round old Cairo with a 'Gyppo on his back.
Perhaps some English tourist out in Palestine may find
My broken-hearted Waler with a wooden plough behind.

No: I think I'd better shoot him and tell a little lie:--
"He floundered in a wombat hole and then lay down to die."
May be I'll get court-martialled; but I'm damned if I'm inclined
To go back to Australia and leave my horse behind.

From Australia in Palestine, 1919

=== World War II ===
During World War II, 360 Australian Walers were assigned to the Texas National Guard 112th Cavalry in New Caledonia. The horses were eventually deemed unfit for jungle warfare. They were sent to India where they served with the Chinese Army before being assigned to the unit known as Merrill's Marauders.

== Post-war ==
As demand for remounts declined in the 1940s, the Waler trade declined.

From 1959 until it was sold to Birds Australia to be converted into a wildlife sanctuary in 2000, Alex Coppock and his wife bred Walers on Newhaven Station in the Northern Territory. The horses were mostly rehomed elsewhere, although the original plan had been to deprive them of water and let them die.

When the Australian Stock Horse Society was formed in 1971, the majority of horses accepted into its studbook were Waler horses. The ASHS also accepted horses of other breeds, notably Quarter horses, which has always been controversial. While many stock horses do have Quarter horse genetics in their breeding, not all do, as there are still many breeders who only breed horses of the old heritage bloodlines. These heritage stock horses have extensive pedigrees, often back to the 19th century, and are direct descendants of Walers with no Quarter Horse or other modern breeds.

=== Reestablishment of the breed ===
In the 1980s efforts began to reestablish the breed using feral Walers descended from horses that had been set loose in rural regions after the commercial trade ceased. The Waler horse now has two breed associations interested in preserving it, the Waler Horse Owners and Breeders Association Australia Inc. (WHOBAA) and the Waler Horse Society of Australia Inc (WHSA). Only horses and their progeny derived from the old bloodlines, with no imported genetics since 1945, can be registered as Walers with the WHOBAA.

Today's Waler is a functional Australian horse, bred from bloodlines that came to Australia before 1945, that is free of imported genetics since that time.

== Threats to the breed ==
In May 2013, up to 10,000 Walers were culled at Tempe Downs Station near Kings Canyon, about 300 km (190 mi) south-west of Alice Springs, Northern Territory, owing to concerns about water sustainability. Ian Conway, owner of neighbouring Kings Creek Station, said that rather than to cull the horses it would be more cost-effective to train Aboriginal men to manage them.

== See also ==
- Australian Light Horse – Australian mounted troops
- Australian Stock Horse – Breed of horse
- Battle of Beersheba – Allied victory over the Ottomans in WWI
- Brumby – Feral horse in Australia
- List of horse breeds
- Project Waler – Unsuccessful Australian defence procurement
