= Tocowa, Mississippi =

Ghost town in Mississippi, US

- Ghost town
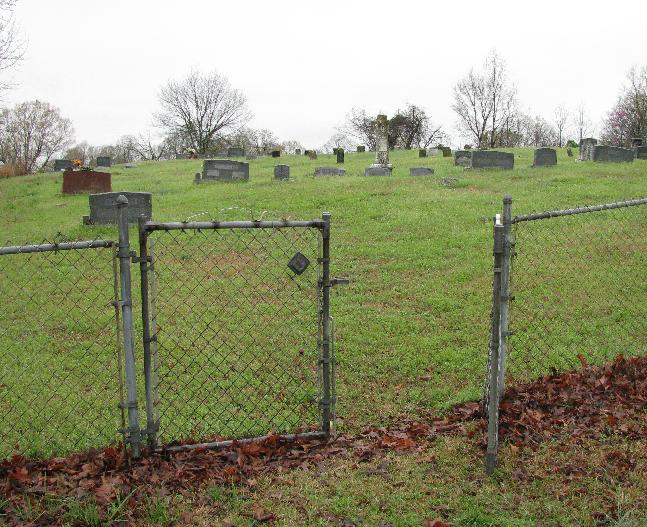
- Center Hill Cemetery in Tocowa.

- Location within Mississippi Location within the United States
- Coordinates: 34°13′25″N 90°03′35″W
- Country: United States
- State: Mississippi
- County: Panola
- Elevation: 243 ft (74 m)
- Time zone: UTC-6 (Central (CST))
  - Summer (DST): UTC-5 (CDT)
- Area code: 662
- GNIS feature ID: 685752

Tocowa is a ghost town located just outside Batesville in Panola County, Mississippi, United States.

== History ==
In 1938, Federal Writers' Project wrote up a sketch of the town, and surmised its name to be derived Chickasaw and Choctaw languages meaning "healing waters". However, more recent scholarship rejects the "healing waters" interpretation, and purports the name to mean "broken and bent down trees" or "firewood".

During the late 18th century, and well into the 19th century, the town grew around a natural spring. The spring was used as a socializing area by Native Americans who believed in the spring's mysterious healing powers and that the water could heal braves wounded in battle. In the May 25, 1867 edition of The Weekly Panola Star newspaper, the spring was described as "a fine, clear, and bold running mineral spring of known and well attested medicinal virtues".

A post office operated under the name Tocowa from 1900 to 1921.

== Notable people ==
- Ronnie Musgrove (born 1956), politician
- Waverly W. Wray (1919–1944), soldier
