= Ballentine, Mississippi =

- Unincorporated community
- Location within Mississippi Location within the United States
- Coordinates: 34°23′39″N 90°05′47″W
- Country: United States
- State: Mississippi
- County: Panola
- Elevation: 184 ft (56 m)
- Time zone: UTC-6 (Central (CST))
  - Summer (DST): UTC-5 (CDT)
- ZIP code: 38606
- Area code: 662
- GNIS feature ID: 666496

Ballentine (also Dickens Place) is an unincorporated community located in Panola County, Mississippi. Ballentine is approximately 3 miles (4.8 km) south of Pleasant Grove and approximately 4.5 miles (7.2 km) south-southwest of Curtis Station on Ballentine Road.

A post office operated under the name Ballentine from 1902 to 1931.
