= Horatio, Mississippi =

- Unincorporated community
- Location within Mississippi Location within the United States
- Coordinates: 34°26′16″N 90°03′20″W
- Country: United States
- State: Mississippi
- County: Panola
- Elevation: 351 ft (107 m)
- Time zone: UTC-6 (Central (CST))
  - Summer (DST): UTC-5 (CDT)
- Area code: 662
- GNIS feature ID: 693532

Horatio is an unincorporated community in Panola County, Mississippi, United States.

A post office operated under the name Horatio from 1902 to 1923.
