= Oliver Hogue =

Australian writer (1880–1919)

- Born: Oliver Hogue; 29 April 1880; Darlington, New South Wales, Australia
- Died: 3 March 1919 (aged 38); London, England
- Occupations: Journalist, poet
- Writing career
- Pen name: Trooper Bluegum
- Period: 1907 – 1919

Oliver Hogue (29 April 1880 – 3 March 1919) was an Australian soldier, journalist, and poet.

== Family ==
The second son of James Alexander Hogue (1846-1920), and Jessie Hogue (1853-1932), née Robards, Oliver Hogue (one of twins), was born at Darlington, New South Wales on 29 April 1880.

He had five brothers and four sisters.

Two of his brothers also served in the First AIF: Lieutenant Stephen James Hogue (1889-1978), Australian Army Medical Corps (A.A.M.C.), and Private Frank Arthur Hogue (1885-1949). Another brother, John Roland Hogue (1882-1958), was a talented professional singer (baritone), Broadway, film, and U.S. television actor, and playwright. One of his sisters, Anne Christina Hogue (1892-1964), was Tien Hogue, the Australian actress of stage and the silent screen, who later married Vice-Admiral Sir Arthur Guy Norris Wyatt, K.B., C.B.

== Early life ==
Hogue attended Forest Lodge Public School in Sydney, and was active in shooting and equestrianism. In his youth, Hogue was also an avid cyclist who logged thousands of miles cycling across the country's eastern and northern coasts.

== Journalism ==
In July 1907, Hogue joined the Sydney Morning Herald as a junior reporter.

== Military service ==
In September 1914, he enlisted in the Australian Imperial Force as a trooper with the 6th Light Horse Regiment. He became a second lieutenant in November 1914, shortly after which he and the 2nd Light Horse Brigade were posted to Egypt. Hogue fought the Battle of Gallipoli but was sent to England midway after contracting typhoid fever. In May 1915, he was promoted to lieutenant and appointed as an orderly officer to brigade commander Colonel Granville Ryrie.

== "Trooper Bluegum" ==
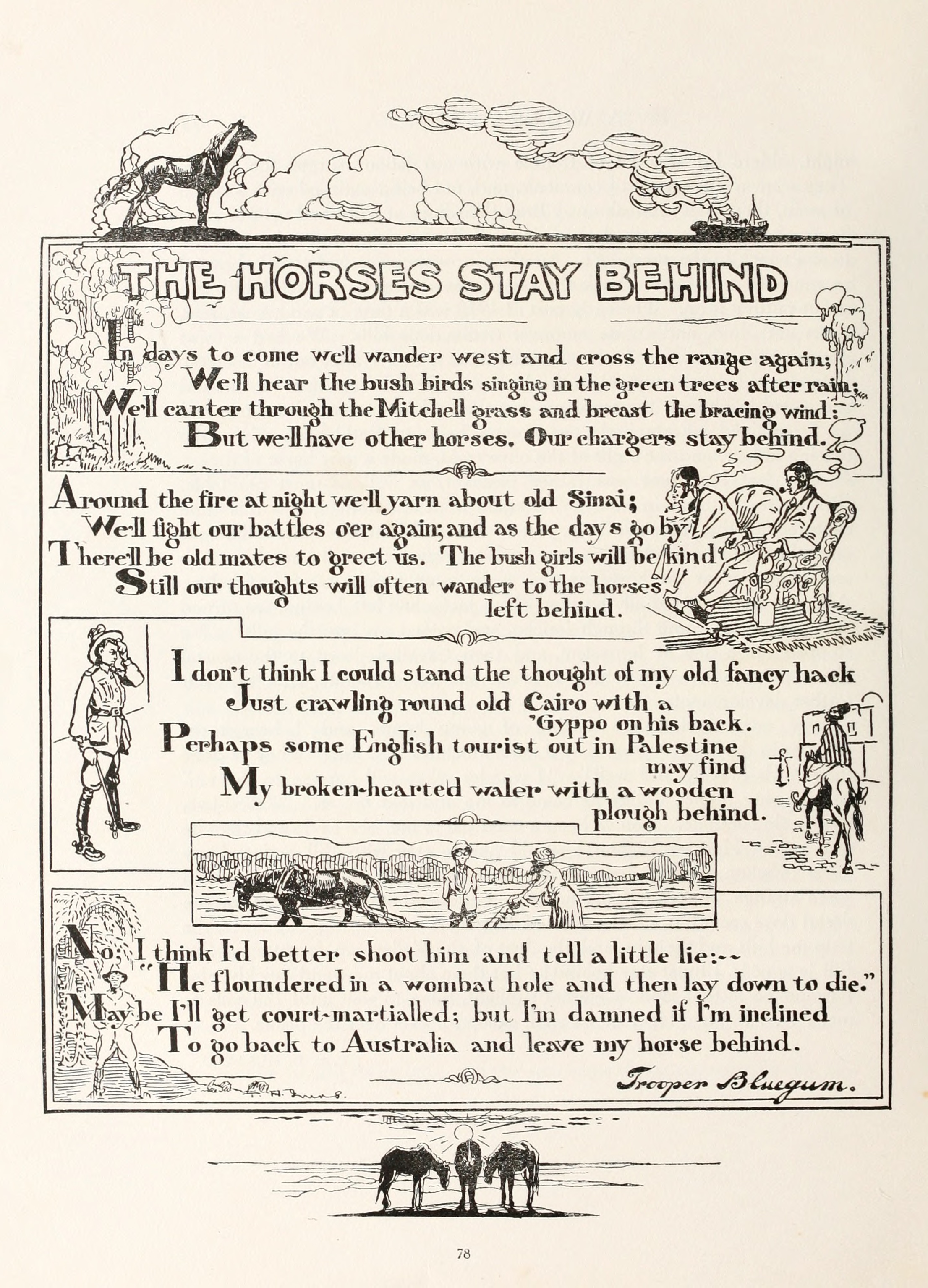
The Horses Stay Behind, Trooper Bluegum (1919).

Hogue sent articles under the pen-name "Trooper Bluegum" to the Sydney Morning Herald, which he later compiled and had published as Love Letters of an Anzac (London, 1916) and Trooper Bluegum at the Dardanelles (London, 1916).

The single work of "Trooper Bluegum" that remains popular today is his (1919) poem, "The Horses Stay Behind". The poem describes the feeling of each of the men of the Light Horse for their horse, and their distress at having learned that, due to quarantine regulations, their horse was not going to return to Australia ("many … of the men of the Light Horse … had planned to buy their horse from the army [and] dreamt of the good times they and their beloved walers could enjoy back home"). Instead, their horse would either be shot (with its shoes, and mane and tail cut off, because "iron and horsehair were salable") and, after having been shot, would be skinned and its hide sold for leather, or would it be sold locally — and would, no doubt, be very "cruelly treated".

== Death ==
Having survived the war, he was admitted to the 3rd General Hospital in London, on 27 February 1919, "dangerously ill" during the influenza epidemic of 1919. His brother Stephen was at his bedside when he died of influenza, five days later, on 3 March 1919.

=== Burial ===
Major Oliver Hogue was buried, with full military honours, at the Brookwood Military Cemetery in Brookwood, Surrey, England.

== Commemorated ==
Hogue Place, in the Canberra suburb of Gilmore, is named in his and his father James Hogue's honour.

== Works ==
Aside from his numerous newspaper articles as both civilian and soldier, he wrote four books:

- Hogue, Oliver (Trooper Bluegum), Love Letters of an Anzac, Andrew Melrose Ltd., (London) 1916.
- Hogue, Oliver, Trooper Bluegum at the Dardanelles".Trooper Bluegum at the Dardanelles: Descriptive Narratives of the More Desperate Engagements on the Gallipoli Peninsula (Second Edition), Andrew Melrose Ltd., (London) 1916.
- Hogue, Oliver, The Home-Sick Anzac and Other War Verses, pp. 37–58 in Poems and Pictures for the Red Cross Society, Australian Red Cross Society, (North Sydney), 1918.
- Hogue, Oliver (Trooper Bluegum), The Cameliers, Andrew Melrose Ltd., (London) 1919.
