= Pritchard & Nickles =

Architecture firm

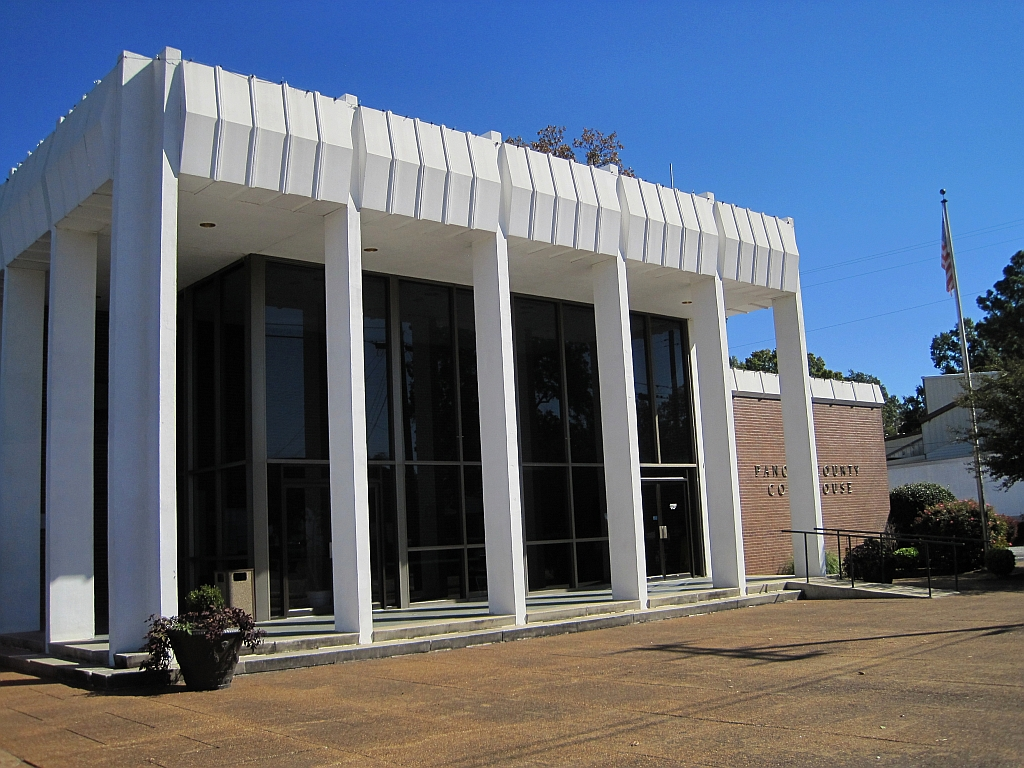
The Panola County Courthouse in Batesville, designed by Pritchard & Nickles and completed in 1967.

Pritchard & Nickles was an architectural firm based in Tunica, Mississippi. The firm designed the Panola County Courthouses in Batesville and Sardis, Mississippi, as well as churches, schools, commercial buildings and residences in Mississippi and Arkansas.

== Partners ==
The partnership, organized in 1951, consisted of two partners: architect John H. Pritchard and civil engineer Clint Nickles.

John Hayes Pritchard (May 5, 1905 – November 18, 1976) was born in Indianapolis and was a graduate of Georgia Tech, earning a BArch in 1930. He was a draftsman and designer in Beaumont, Texas, before entering government service in 1934. In 1938 he was appointed chief architect to the National Youth Administration and from 1940 to 1942 he was based in Memphis, Tennessee, as its southern regional director. During World War II he served in the Civil Affairs Division of the United States Army. In 1946 he settled in Tunica and established his architectural firm. He practiced independently for about five years before establishing his partnership with Nickles.

Pritchard was highly active in the Mississippi chapter of the American Institute of Architects (AIA). At different times he held several chapter offices, including president in 1950–51, and served as Gulf States Regional Director from 1956 to 1959. In 1960 he was elected a Fellow of the AIA. In 1969 he was elected to the Tunica Board of Aldermen and also was an organizer of the local chamber of commerce. He died in Tunica at the age of 71.

David Clinton "Clint" Nickles (died April 13, 1994) was a graduate of Mississippi State University and served in the marine corps during World War II. He died in Memphis at the age of 75.

== Architectural works ==
- 1961 – Conner Hall, University of Mississippi, Oxford, Mississippi
- 1961 – Grenada County Courthouse, 16 1st St, Grenada, Mississippi
- 1966 – Tad Smith Coliseum, University of Mississippi, Oxford, Mississippi
  - Designed by a joint venture of Brewer, Skewes & Godbold of Clarksdale and Pritchard & Nickles.
- 1967 – Panola County Courthouse, 151 Public Sq, Batesville, Mississippi
- 1974 – Panola County Courthouse, 215 S Pocahontas St, Sardis, Mississippi
