= Terza, Mississippi =

Unincorporated community in Mississippi, US

- Unincorporated community
- Location within Mississippi Location within the United States
- Coordinates: 34°21′5″N 89°51′15″W
- Country: United States
- State: Mississippi
- County: Panola
- Elevation: 302 ft (92 m)
- Time zone: UTC-6 (Central (CST))
  - Summer (DST): UTC-5 (CDT)
- ZIP code: 38606
- Area code: 662
- GNIS feature ID: 692355

Terza is an unincorporated community in Panola County, Mississippi. Terza is approximately 6.8 miles (10.9 km) south-southeast of Sardis and approximately 5.8 miles (9.3 km) east-northeast of Batesville on Terza Road southwest of Sardis Lake.

A post office operated under the name Terza from 1890 to 1911.
