= Curtis Station, Mississippi =

- Unincorporated community
- Location within Mississippi Location within the United States
- Coordinates: 34°20′24″N 90°08′21″W
- Country: United States
- State: Mississippi
- County: Panola
- Elevation: 157 ft (48 m)
- Time zone: UTC-6 (Central (CST))
  - Summer (DST): UTC-5 (CDT)
- ZIP code: 38606
- Area code: 662
- GNIS feature ID: 669032

Curtis Station is an unincorporated community located in Panola County, Mississippi. Curtis Station is approximately 4.3 miles (6.9 km) north-northeast of Locke Station and approximately 4.5 miles (7.2 km) south-southwest of Balletine on Curtis Road.

A post office operated under the name Curtis Station from 1927 to 1935.
