= Stranahan =

Stranahan may refer to:

== Surname ==
- Clara Harrison Stranahan (1831–1905), American author
- Farrand Stranahan (1778–1826), American lawyer and politician
- Farrand Stewart Stranahan (1842–1904), American Civil War veteran, railroad executive, banker, and Republican U.S. politician
- Frank Stranahan (1922–2013), American golfer and powerlifter
- George Stranahan (1931–2021), American physicist and entrepreneur
- James S. T. Stranahan (1808–1898), United States Representative from New York
- Lee Stranahan (born 1965), American writer, former reporter for Breitbart News, Radio Sputnik broadcaster
- Nevada N. Stranahan (1861–1928), Collector of the Port of New York
- Susan Q. Stranahan, American journalist

== Other ==
- R. A. Stranahan Arboretum, 47 acres (190,000 m^{2}) in Toledo, Ohio, USA, containing 1500 trees from USA, China, Serbia, Japan, and Norway
- Stranahan High School, high school located in Ft. Lauderdale, Florida
- Stranahan House, historic home in Fort Lauderdale, Florida, United States
- Stranahan-DelVecchio House, historic home in Athens, New York
- Stranahan Run (East Branch Oil Creek tributary), tributary in Pennsylvania
- Stranahan Theater, 2,424-seat concert hall located in Toledo, Ohio, USA
- Stranahan's Colorado Whiskey, 94 proof, small-batch whiskey distilled in Denver, Colorado

== See also ==
- Shanahan
