= Buxton, Mississippi =

- Unincorporated community
- Location within Mississippi Location within the United States
- Coordinates: 34°32′52″N 90°11′52″W
- Country: United States
- State: Mississippi
- County: Panola
- Elevation: 197 ft (60 m)
- Time zone: UTC-6 (Central (CST))
  - Summer (DST): UTC-5 (CDT)
- Area code: 662
- GNIS feature ID: 691742

Buxton is an unincorporated community in Panola County, Mississippi, United States.

== Transportation ==
Amtrak’s City of New Orleans, which operates between New Orleans and Chicago, passes through the town on CN tracks, but makes no stop. The nearest station is located in Marks, 22 miles (35 km) to the south.
