= Tad Smith Coliseum =

Multi-purpose arena on the campus of the University of Mississippi

C. M. "Tad" Smith Coliseum
- "The Tad Pad"
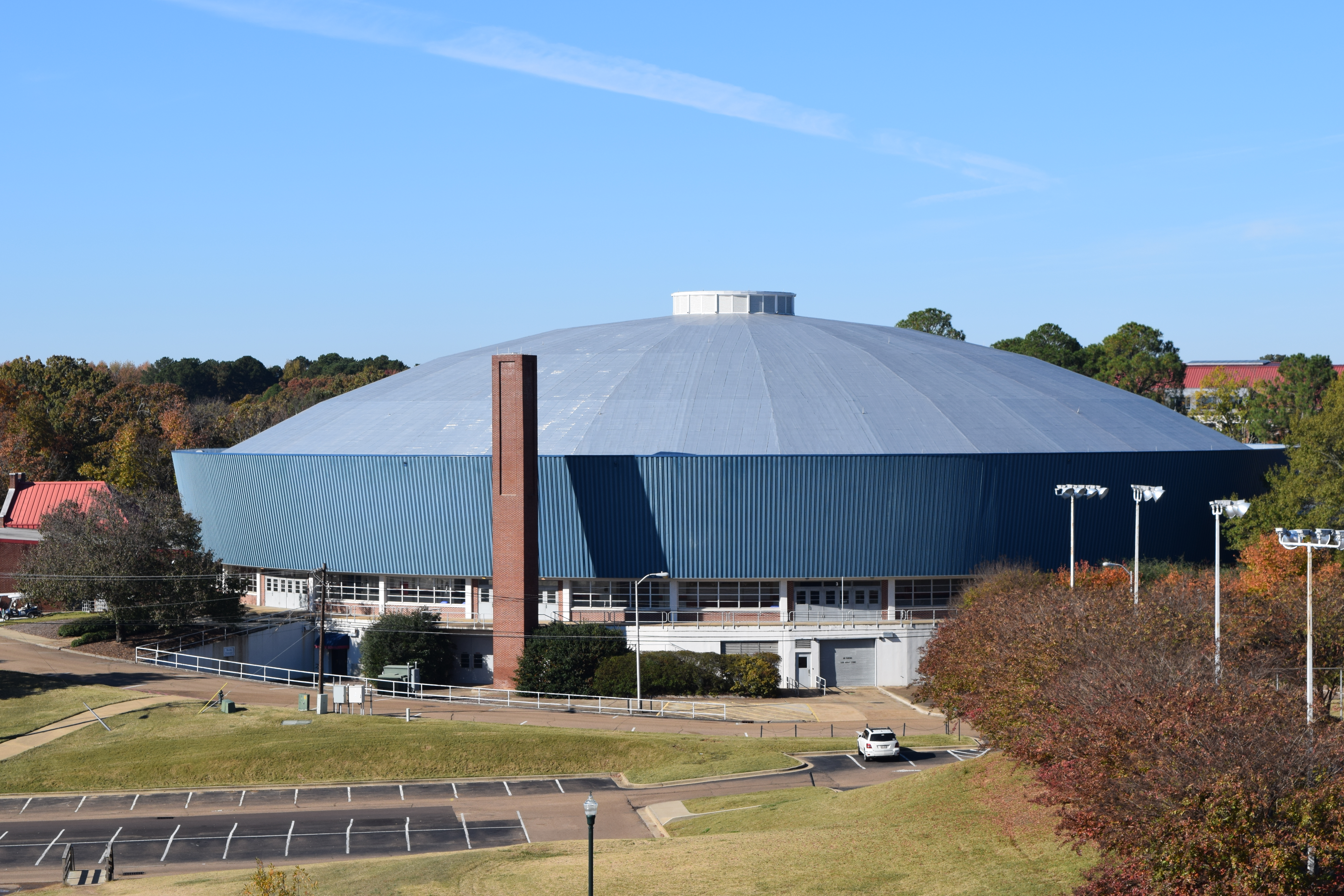
- Interactive map of C. M. "Tad" Smith Coliseum
- Former names: Rebel Coliseum (1966–1972)
- Location: Chucky Mullins Dr. University, MS 38677
- Coordinates: 34°21′43.91″N 89°32′21.49″W
- Owner: University of Mississippi
- Operator: University of Mississippi
- Capacity: 8,867 (2013–2016); 9,061 (2008–2013); 8,700 (2001–2008); 8,135 (1988–2001); 8,500 (1966–1988)
- Surface: Hardwood

Construction
- Groundbreaking: 1964
- Opened: February 21, 1966
- Closed: January 3, 2016
- Demolished: 2026 (scheduled)
- Cost: $1.8 million ($17.9 million in 2025 dollars)
- Architects: Brewer, Skewes & Godbold and Pritchard & Nickles

Tenants
- Ole Miss Rebels (Men's and women's basketball)

C. M. "Tad" Smith Coliseum is an 8,867-seat multi-purpose arena on the campus of the University of Mississippi. Through the first part of the 2015–16 basketball season, it was home to the University of Mississippi Rebels men's and women's basketball teams, but was replaced by a new arena, The Sandy and John Black Pavilion, in January 2016. It has also hosted many concerts, including Widespread Panic in September 1995 and The Allman Brothers with Gov't Mule in November 1995.

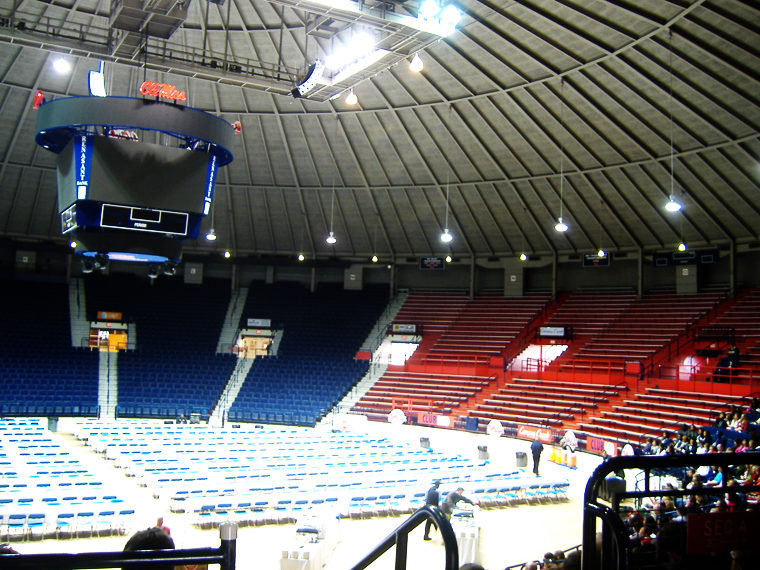
Inside

The circular building, similar to many arenas constructed at the time, has a 272-foot (83 m) diameter white steel-framed, Neoprene-covered roof which tops out at 89 feet (27 m) above the court. From its exterior, it looks like a giant hub cap. The floor, 130' from end to end with its Rebel red and blue trim, is located 12 feet (3.7 m) below the surrounding ground level. The seats were replaced in 2001 with navy blue upholstered seats. In 2010 the Tad Pad was upgraded. These upgrades included a unique new center hung video display, featuring four LED boards approximately 7 feet (2.1 m) high by 13 feet (4.0 m) wide. Two ring displays are also part of the center hung structure and are able to show a variety of graphics, animations and statistical information. Overall the display measures approximately 17 feet (5.2 m) high by 24 feet (7.3 m) wide and also features four dedicated scoring sections. In addition to this upgrade, Daktronics provided a custom sound system for the newly renovated arena. The outside of the building includes red Mississippi brick and blue vinyl-covered steel siding. It is located to the southwest of the center of campus, west of Vaught–Hemingway Stadium and across the street from the Robert C. Khayat Law Center. A Confederate cemetery lies behind the building.

The building was designed by a joint venture of two architectural firms: Brewer, Skewes & Godbold of Clarksdale and Pritchard & Nickles of Tunica. It opened during 1965–1966 as Rebel Coliseum. It was renamed on March 25, 1972, to honor C. M. "Tad" Smith, former three-sport letterman, coach, and athletic director at the university.

The largest crowd ever at the building was on February 10, 2007, when 9,452 fans watched the Rebels defeat the No. 18 Alabama Crimson Tide.

Prior to the building of the Coliseum, the team played in Old Gym (now the Martindale Student Services Center), a 2,500-seat gym built in 1929.

In July 2014, Ole Miss broke ground on a new arena named The Pavilion at Ole Miss, which was completed during the 2015–16 basketball season. The final game as the permanent home for the men's team at Tad Smith Coliseum was on December 22, 2015, with the Rebels defeating Troy 83–80 in overtime. The final game as the Rebels permanent home overall was on January 3, 2016 when the Ole Miss women defeated Vanderbilt 55–52. The men's team opened the new arena on January 7 against Alabama, with the women's basketball team making their debut in the new arena on January 10 against Florida.

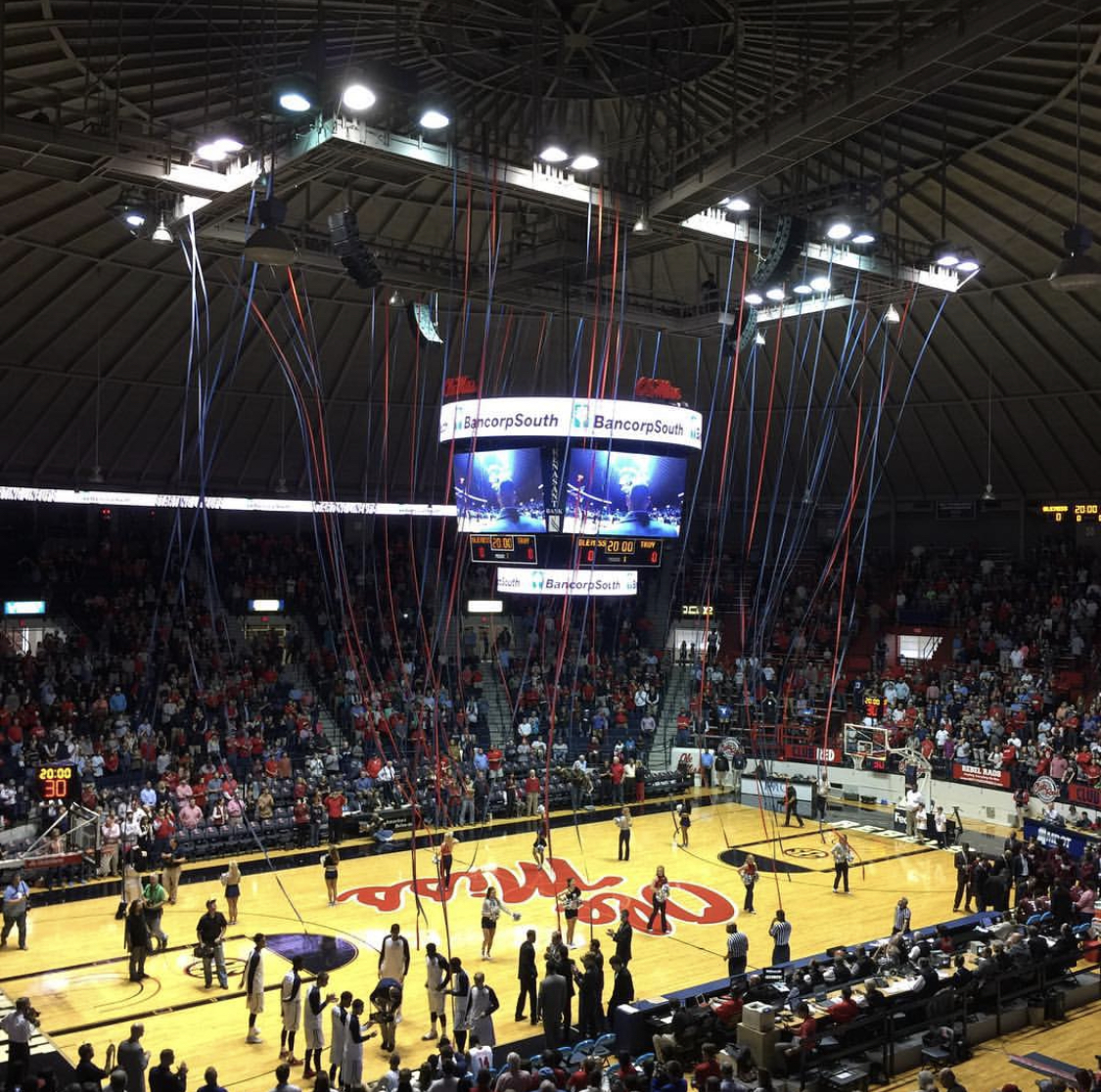
Final Game at Tad Pad

Ole Miss announced that the Coliseum will be demolished beginning in the summer of 2026 as part of a slate of campus construction projects. The site will be used for surface parking while a long-term plan for its future is determined.

Tad Pad Throwback Games
In August 2023 Ole Miss Athletics announced that a throwback game at the Tad Pad would take place on November 17, 2023. In this game, Ole Miss defeated Sam Houston 70–67 in the first game back in the Tad Pad since 2016. On November 12th, 2024 Ole Miss took the floor at the Tad Pad once again defeating South Alabama 64-54. The final game at the Tad Pad was held on November 14, 2025, with the Rebs beating Cal State Bakersfield 82-60.
