= Timothy Shanahan =

Timothy Shanahan may refer to:

- Timothy Shanahan (philosopher) (born 1960), American philosopher
- Timothy Shanahan (educator), American educator
- Timothy M. Shanahan, American geologist
