= Paul Gardner (writer) =

- Education: University of California, Berkeley; College of William & Mary
- Occupations: Writer; filmmaker

Paul Gardner is an American writer and filmmaker living in New York City.

== Background ==
Gardner grew up in Pasadena and Los Angeles. He attended the University of California, Berkeley, and graduated from the College of William & Mary in Virginia.

== Career ==
Gardner was on staff of The New York Times for seven years as a writer-critic and assistant editor of Sunday Arts & Leisure. In Paris, where he lived for over three years, he contributed theatre and film reviews to the Financial Times of London and worked on film projects with director Claude Chabrol, co-scripting Chabrol's Ten Days' Wonder (film) (La Décade prodigieuse), which starred Orson Welles and Anthony Perkins.

He published a William Faulkner portrait published in A Faulkner Perspective for the Franklin Library; Lynn, the memoirs of Royal Ballet star Lynn Seymour; Brooklyn: People and Places, Past and Present, a socio-cultural history of the famous borough; and Louise Bourgeois, a personal journey into the life of the acclaimed sculptor. Writing for a variety of periodicals, Gardner interviewed subjects as diverse as the Beatles (on their first visit to the U.S.A.), Howard Hawks in Palm Springs, and Leni Riefenstahl in Pöcking, Bayern.

A founding board member of the Delaware Theatre Company, Gardner helped launch the state's first regional theatre in Wilmington.

With Chris Maybach, he co-produced the Art City series of three contemporary art documentaries featuring artists Brice Marden, Elizabeth Murray (artist), Agnes Martin, and Neil Jenney, among others; and the visual profile, Richard Tuttle: Never Not an Artist. The films have been shown at festivals in Toronto, Montréal, Paris, and Naples, as well as at art museums throughout the world.

== Bibliography ==
=== Books ===
- Lynn : The Autobiography of Lynn Seymour. London : Granada Publishing Ltd., 1984.
- Brooklyn : People and Places, Past and Present (with Grace Glueck). New York : Harry N. Abrams, 1991.
- Louise Bourgeois. New York : Rizzoli, 1994.

=== Selected essays, articles, and other works ===
- "Maharis : From Albee to Route 66, TV Actor, Resuming Film Career, Has Off Broadway Credits", The New York Times, November 24, 1963
- "The French They Are a Movie Race", The New York Times, May 18, 1969
- "Perry Making Hollywood Film – His Way", The New York Times, February 10, 1972
- "Faulkner Remembered", A Faulkner Perspective. Franklin Center, Pennsylvania : The Franklin Library, 1976
- "My Night with Rohmer", New York, November 8, 1976
- "Sometimes, Nothing Succeeds Like a Flop", The New York Times, September 16, 1977
- "Think of Leonardo Wielding a Pixel and a Mouse", The New York Times, April 22, 1984
- "Leni Riefenstahl", Vanity Fair, July 1984
- "Chuck Close : Making the Impossible Possible", ArtNews, May 1992
- "The Houses That Louise Built", HG, October 1992
- "Chamber Music Barges in on the Brooklyn Docks", The Smithsonian, January 1994
- "Neil Jenney: Scary Territory", ArtNews, January 1996
- "When France Was Home to African-American Artists", The Smithsonian, March 1996
- "Music to the Eyes", Harper's Bazaar, April 1996
- "Carl Van Vechten, Culture Connoisseur", On Paper : The Journal of Prints, Drawings and Photography, May–June 1998
- "Auction Signals," ArtNews, October 1998
- "Neil Jenney : The Bad Years 1969-70", Exhibit Catalogue, Gagosian Gallery, New York City, 2001
- "Renaissance Men by the Letter", The Nation, July 2, 2001 https://www.thenation.com/article/renaissance-men-letter/
- "Richard Tuttle: Odd Man In", ArtNews, April 2004

== Filmography ==
=== As co-writer ===
- Ten Days' Wonder (1971)

=== As co-producer ===
- Art City 1 : Making It in Manhattan (1996)
- Art City 2 : Simplicity (2002)
- Art City 3 : A Ruling Passion (2002)
- Richard Tuttle : Never Not an Artist (2005)

== Additional sources ==
- Alan Wells, editor. Mass Media and Society (Third Edition). California : Mayfield Publishing Company, 1979.
- Deborah Jowitt. Jerome Robbins : His Life, His Theater, His Dance. New York : Simon & Schuster, 2004.
- Mel Gussow. Edward Albee : A Singular Journey. New York : Applause, 2001.
- Arthur Gelb. The City Room. New York : G.P. Putnam's Sons, 2003.
- Alice Goldfarb Marquis. The Pop Revolution. Boston : MFA Publishing, 2010.
