= "We Ain't What We Was" =

1997 book by Frederick M. Wirt

"We Ain't What We Was": Civil Rights in the New South is a 1997 non-fiction book by Frederick M. Wirt, published by Duke University Press.

The book is how Panola County, Mississippi's situation changed after laws protecting African-Americans' rights were enacted.

The title is taken from a common phrase among African-American residents of Panola County which highlights how their situation had improved.

Anne Permaloff of Auburn University stated that the book considers Panola County to be "a metaphor for change throughout the South."

== Background ==
This book is a continuation of Wirt's previous book, The Politics of Southern Equality, published in 1970.

== Contents ==
Wirt's book argued that while African-Americans gained more rights, integration did not occur culturally, and so black and white residents continued to have race-segregated religious practices and friendships.

== Reception ==
Richard L. Engstrom of the University of New Orleans felt that the book is the strongest with analyzing the economic and educational changes, while the political coverage was "weaker".

Glenn Feldman of the University of Alabama at Birmingham described the book as "interesting and useful", as well as "valuable".

Permaloff argued that the book "is fascinating and makes the book worthwhile reading" due to the content about Panola County, although she felt that the book did not "adequately document southern-wide interpretations".
