= David Shanahan =

David Shanahan may refer to:

- David Shanahan (politician) (1862–1936), Illinois Republican state legislator
- David Shanahan (rugby union) (born 1993), Irish professional rugby union player
