= Mike Shanahan (writer) =

British biologist and writer

Mike Shanahan is a British biologist and writer whose work focuses on rainforests, climate change, biodiversity and related issues. He studied at the University of Leeds, where he received a BSc in biology, MSc in biodiversity and conservation and PhD in rainforest ecology. Between 1997 and 1999, he undertook research in the rainforest of Lambir Hills National Park, in Sarawak, Borneo, and on an island volcano: Long Island, Papua New Guinea. His research focused on figs (Ficus species) and the animals that eat them.

From 2001 to 2004, Shanahan worked for the Environmental Justice Foundation on projects related to pesticide poisoning in Cambodia, bear farming in Vietnam and the social and environmental impacts of shrimp farming throughout the tropics. From 2004 to 2007, he was news editor of SciDev.Net. In 2005, he and colleagues won the 'Best Science Writing on the World Wide Web' prize in the Association of British Science Writers Awards, for their coverage of the Indian Ocean tsunami. Shanahan has also written for Nature, The Economist, The Ecologist and Ensia.

From 2006 to 2014, Shanahan was the International Institute for Environment and Development's press officer. He published research and guidance on media coverage of climate change, biodiversity and pastoralism. In 2007, Shanahan and colleagues at Internews' Earth Journalism Network and Panos London co-founded the Climate Change Media Partnership, which has enabled more than 170 journalists from developing countries to report on UN climate change negotiations.

In September 2016, Unbound will publish Shanahan's book: Ladders to Heaven: How fig trees shaped our history, fed our imaginations and can enrich our future. In November 2016, Chelsea Green Publishing will publish the book in North American with a new title: Gods, Wasps, and Stranglers: The Secret History and Redemptive Future of Fig Trees. Shanahan illustrated Ladders to Heaven and Ross Piper's Extraordinary Animals.
