= Timothy M. Shanahan =

American geologist

Timothy M. Shanahan is an American geologist and Associate Professor of Geological Sciences at Jackson School of Geosciences, University of Texas-Austin. He is known for his works on paleoclimatology and environmental change. Shanahan is a Kavli Fellow of National Academy of Sciences.
