= Patrick Shanahan =

Patrick Shanahan may refer to:

- Patrick M. Shanahan (born 1962), former acting United States Secretary of Defense
- Patrick Shanahan (politician) (1908–2000), Irish Fianna Fáil politician
- Patrick Shanahan (Medal of Honor) (1867–1937), United States Navy sailor
- Patrick Shanahan, drummer for Rick Nelson's Stone Canyon Band and for the New Riders of the Purple Sage
