= John Shanahan =

John Shanahan may refer to:

- John Shanahan (swimmer) (1924–1987), New Zealand swimmer
- John N.T. Shanahan, United States Air Force lieutenant general
- John W. Shanahan (1846–1916), American Roman Catholic bishop
