= Elizabeth Shanahan =

American political scientist

- Education: Dartmouth College; Idaho State University
- Scientific career
- Fields: Political science, public policy
- Workplaces: Montana State University

Elizabeth A. Shanahan is an American political scientist specializing in public policy. She is a professor and associate vice president for research development at the Montana State University.

== Life ==
Shanahan earned a B.A. in comparative literature from Dartmouth College in 1986. She completed a Master of Counseling in community counseling (1994), M.P.A. in public policy (2004), and a Doctor of Arts in political science (2005) from Idaho State University.

Shanahan joined the department of political science at Montana State University in 2005 as an assistant professor. She was promoted to associate professor in 2011 and professor in 2020. She became the associate president for research development in 2021. In 2023, she was named a fellow of the National Academy of Public Administration.
