= Francis Hines =

American artist (1920-2016)

- Born: Francis Mattson Hines; 1920; Washington D.C.
- Died: 2016 (aged 95–96)
- Spouse: Sondra Ross

Francis Mattson Hines (1920–2016) was an American artist known for his large-scale public wrapped works. Many of his paintings and drawings were found in a Connecticut dumpster in 2017 and were re-exhibited in 2022.

== Early years ==
Hines was born in Washington, D. C. He attended the Cleveland School of Art from 1940 to 1942. He served in World War II in the U.S. Army Corps of Engineers in the Photo Reconnaissance Unit for Military Intelligence. After the war he moved to New York, working as a freelance artist doing commercial art, and was briefly married. He married again in 1949, to Sondra Ross. The couple moved to Hartford, Connecticut, where Hines worked as chief commercial artist at G. Fox & Co. a large department store. In 1976 he moved to Watertown, Connecticut, renting the barn that became one of his studios and storage location for his artworks. In the same year he purchased a condominium on 11th Street and in 1977 he began renting a studio at 325 Bowery at the corner of 2nd Street in NoHo which he shared with artist Nick Weber.

== Style and influence ==
Hines began his creative career as a commercial artist, moving to three-dimensional artworks during the 1960s, creating works formed by "embedding numerous found objects into a series of diorama-like wall hangings featuring historical figures dutifully wrapped in tin foil and various fabrics." As his wrapping works progressed, they became larger, with structures being tightly constrained by gauzy fabrics in geometric patterns. His first wrapped building was a tenement building in the East Village in 1978, wrapped with "1,500 yards of heavy white synthetic gauze fabric over its façade." His second wrapped building was also a tenement, in 1979. He was contacted by the community relations director of New York University, who were working to raise money to clean up and revitalize the Washington Square Arch and draw attention to the poor condition of monuments within New York City. This resulted in his best-known artwork, the wrapping of the Washington Square Arch, which was done by 23 people many of whom were artists. They used 8,000 yards of synthetic white fabric and the result was described as "a giant bandage for a wounded monument." He also wrapped at least ten buildings within New York City including parts of JFK Airport and the Port Authority Bus Terminal.

Hines' paintings were often meticulously sketched out beforehand. He created a series entitled Hoboken Autobody (1983–84), which was a series of 50 numbered paintings enhanced with strips of nylon gauze stretched and anchored them into the painting's backings. In the mid- to late 1980s he worked on an Urban Icons series, which explored the relationship of sexual symbolism and a world increasingly filled with technology. The images usually include women who are being gradually turned into cyborgs and again include tightly strung nylon fabric atop the paintings. This was followed by his Mutagenesis Series, which reflected on the evolution of human genetics and whether increased reliance on technology could alter the human genome. Hines wrote in 1994:

Within the modern city the human animal has become part of a biological/industrial morass, inseparable from the structures and products it creates. Here the human represents but one element in a unique organism of its own making, an organism that is part biological, part structural and mechanical, part electronic. The complexity of this interrelationship constantly increases with ever-advancing technology among these various elements. Is our basic nature being irrevocably modified to accommodate this condition? These drawings express my response to this universal evolvment.

Hines' last major public sculpture, CrossOvers, was in Johannesburg, South Africa, in 2000 when he was 81 years old, and combined many of his signature motifs. He stacked five cars into a pyramid and wrapped it in synthetic fabric. He continued to work into his 90s, creating large pastels in his Mutagenesis Series in which "biomorphic forms are overlaid by a grid pattern" titled Cages (2007–2011) and Organisms (2012–2016)

== Death and artwork rediscovery ==
Hines had a stroke in 2014 and died in 2016. His condo on 11th Street went co-op in 1981 and sold for $1.6 million in 2017, staged with Hines' artworks. The barn where he had stored the majority of his artwork was being sold and his estate had to comply with a tight deadline that was imposed for cleaning out the barn's contents; the contents of the barn were deemed abandoned and a contractor was assigned to clear out the contents.

Hines' artworks wound up in a dumpster on the property in Watertown, Connecticut, being cleared out by ENCO environmental and demolition. Since many of the canvases featured illustrations of automobile parts, the owner contacted Jared Whipple, a car mechanic and good friend from Waterbury, Connecticut. Whipple contacted friends and family of Hines to research the pieces. He was given permission by Hines' sons to keep and sell the artworks. Some of the pieces were exhibited at the Mattatuck Museum in Waterbury in 2021 with a larger gallery show planned for 2022 with Hollis Taggart Galleries called Unwrapping the Mystery of New York’s Wrapper.
