= Michael Shanahan (Australian Army officer) =

Australian soldier (1870–1964)

Michael Shanahan DSO, VD
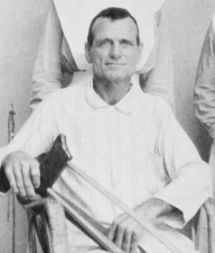
- Born: 30 March 1870; Roma, Queensland
- Died: 12 October 1964 (aged 94)
- Military career
- Allegiance: Colony of Queensland; Australia
- Branch: Queensland Defence Forces (1886–1901); Citizen Military Forces (1901–14); Australian Imperial Force (1914–17)
- Service years: 1886–1917
- Rank: Major
- Unit: 2nd Light Horse Regiment
- Conflicts: First World War; Gallipoli campaign; Sinai and Palestine campaign; Battle of Romani
- Awards: Distinguished Service Order; Colonial Auxiliary Forces Officers' Decoration; Mentioned in Despatches

Michael "Mick" Shanahan, DSO, VD (30 March 1870 – 12 October 1964) was a soldier with the Australian 2nd Light Horse Regiment during the First World War, remembered for heroic rescues during the Battle of Romani.

== Early life ==
Shanahan was born in Roma, Queensland, son of Thomas Shanahan (1843 – 4 December 1915) and Mrs Shanahan (died 9 March 1919). He was educated at Roma Public School and trained as a carpenter, working for his father.

Shanahan made several notable rescues in Roma's Chinatown in March 1890, when the Bungil Creek flooded. He took his small punt to Bungeworgorai, where he rescued the Murray family, then took provisions to a couple (the Goggs), and conveyed them to safety.

== Military career ==
Shanahan served with the Queensland Defence Forces before Federation: from August 1886 to November 1888 as a bugler with the Roma Volunteer Rifles, and then as a bugler, then corporal, from December 1888 to June 1893 with D Company of the 4th Queensland Regiment. He was ranked private, then corporal, with M Company of the Queensland Rifles from February 1899 to February 1901. Then came Federation, and he enlisted with E Company, 2nd Battalion, as corporal, and transferred to 14th Australian Light Horse Regiment in July 1903 to October 1906.

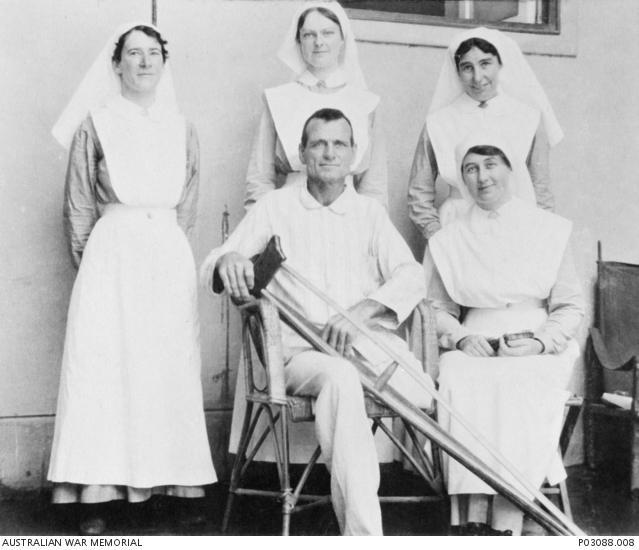
Group portrait of nurses and Major Michael Shanahan, 1916.

In August 1914 Shanahan volunteered for the Australian Imperial Force and was appointed a lieutenant in the 14th Light Horse Regiment. He landed at Gallipoli on 9 May 1915 and was made an acting captain on 18 September. He was one of those evacuated in December 1915, disembarking at Alexandria on 14 January 1916. Two days later he was sent to the front at Wardan with the 2nd Light Horse Regiment. He was promoted to captain in February and major on 17 June 1916, several times wounded in action, the second requiring hospitalisation at Cairo where, on 17 August 1916, his left leg was amputated above the knee. The injury occurred under fire, after Shanahan had dismounted to assist a trooper who was having trouble mounting his horse. He was awarded the Distinguished Service Order (DSO) on 13 October 1916 (presented by King George V at Buckingham Palace), then struck off strength and returned to Australia in January 1917. His DSO warrant read: "For conspicuous gallantry in action. He organised and maintained the outpost line with the greatest courage and determination. Later he rescued several wounded men under very heavy fire. He was wounded."

== Personal ==
Shanahan married Charlotte Dunstan on 29 January 1896; they adopted Charles Wieneke Schrimph or Schrimpf as a son.

He represented the Shanahan family, of which there were eleven surviving members, at the "Back to Roma" celebrations of 1951.

== Legend of "Bill the Bastard" ==
Contemporary details of the rescues performed by Shanahan are sparse, but fleshed out in later accounts.

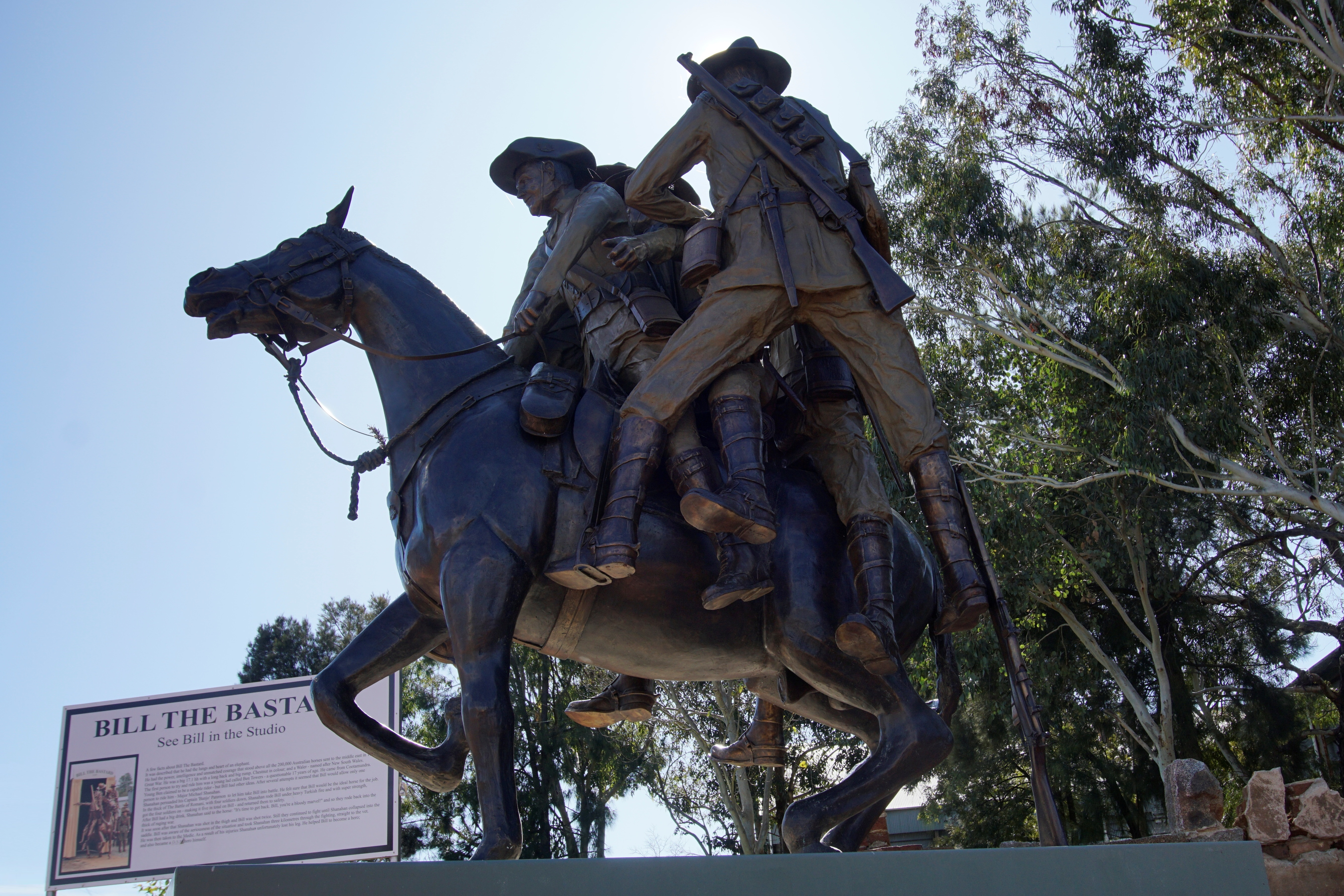
"Bill the Bastard" by Carl Valerius

In Light Horse: The Story of Australia's Mounted Troops (1978), Elyne Mitchell, daughter of Sir Harry Chauvel, recounts how Shanahan, while checking his forward listening posts one dark night, came upon four troopers who had lost their mounts and were outflanked by the enemy. Two were hoisted onto his horse, "Bill the Bastard", while the others jogged along on either side, each holding a stirrup, and proceeded back to camp through no man's land.

Although sometimes conflated, the action in which his leg was irreparably damaged was at a later date.

In a later account by Roland Perry, more details are revealed: "Bill the Bastard" was a 17.1 hands chestnut stallion that no-one could ride, so was employed at Gallipoli as a packhorse, whose last burden was the body of John Simpson Kirkpatrick. Shanahan later gained the horse's trust and requested Banjo Paterson, head of the Remount Service, to release the recalcitrant animal to him. Perry has "the Bastard" carrying not three men but five, the inspiration for Carl Valerius' monument on the Burley Griffin Way at Murrumburrah, opposite the Light Horse Memorial Park.
