= Panola County, Mississippi =

County in Mississippi, United States

- County
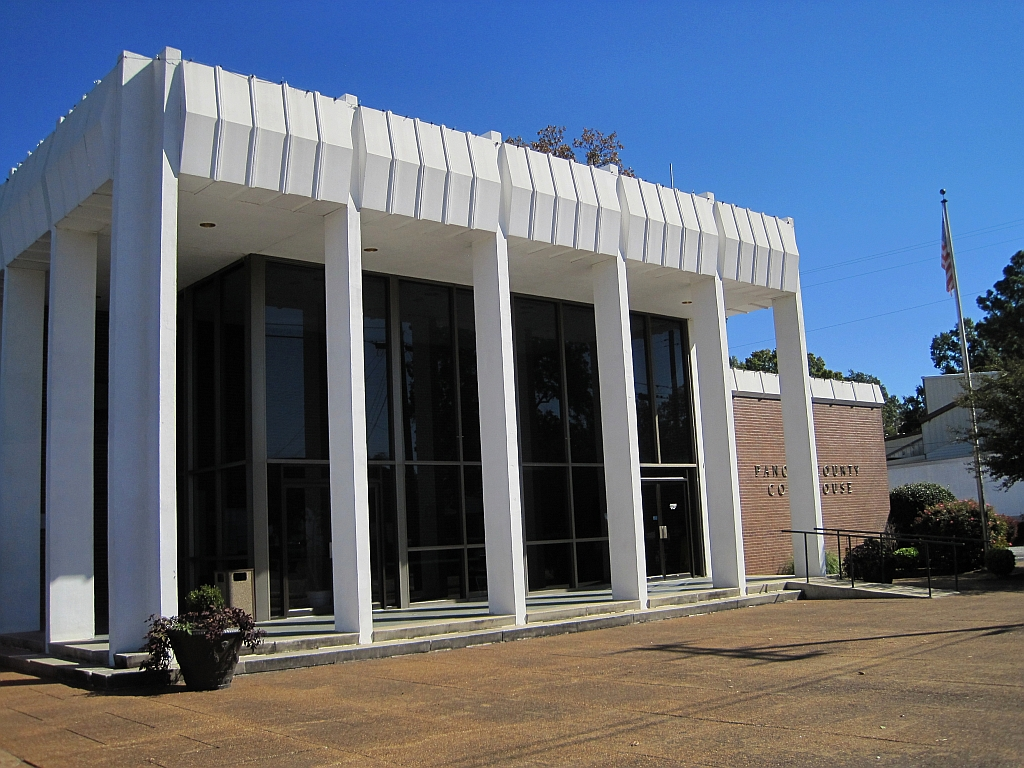
- Panola County Courthouse (designed by Pritchard & Nickles)

- Location within the U.S. state of Mississippi
- Coordinates: 34°22′N 89°57′W
- Country: United States
- State: Mississippi
- Founded: February 9, 1836
- Named for: name of Cotton in the Choctaw language
- Seat: Batesville and Sardis
- Largest city: Batesville

Area
  - Total: 705 sq mi (1,830 km^{2})
  - Land: 685 sq mi (1,770 km^{2})
  - Water: 20 sq mi (52 km^{2}) 2.8%

Population (2020)
  - Total: 33,208
  - Estimate (2025): 32,691 ▼
  - Density: 48.5/sq mi (18.7/km^{2})
- Time zone: UTC−6 (Central)
  - Summer (DST): UTC−5 (CDT)
- Congressional district: 2nd
- Website: www.panolacoms.com

Panola County is a county located in the U.S. state of Mississippi. As of the 2020 census, the population was 33,208. Its county seats are Sardis and Batesville. The county is located just east of the Mississippi Delta in the northern part of the state. It is bisected by the Tallahatchie River flowing to the southwest; travel difficulties because of the river resulted in two county seats being established.

Panola is the anglicization of ponolo, a word meaning "thread" in both old Choctaw and Chickasaw and "cotton" in modern Choctaw. This was one of twelve large counties organized from the Chickasaw Cession of 1832.

== History ==
Following forced removal of most of the historic Chickasaw tribe to territory west of the Mississippi River, Panola County was established February 9, 1836, by the state legislature. It is one of the twelve large northern Mississippi counties created that year from the territory of the Chickasaw Cession of 1832. The original act defined its limits as follows:

Beginning at the point where the line between ranges 9 and 10 strikes the center of section 6, and running thence south with the said range line, and from its termination in a direct line to the northern boundary of Tallahatchie County and thence along the northern boundary of Tallahatchie and Yalobusha counties, to the center of range 5 west; thence north through the center of range 5 west, according to the sectional lines, to the center of township six; thence west through the center of township six, according to the sectional lines, to the beginning.

On February 1, 1877, when Quitman County was organized by the legislature, it took a small fraction of Panola's southwestern area, reducing Panola from an area of 756 square miles (1,960 km^{2}) to its present land surface of 705 square miles (1,830 km^{2}). By 1920 the county had a population of 27,845. Its inhabitants gradually increased in numbers from 1850 to 1910, from 11,444 to 31,274, reaching a peak of population in 1940. Through this period the area was based on agriculture. From then until 1980, population declined markedly, as many African Americans moved west and north in the second wave of the Great Migration, to take jobs on the West Coast in the burgeoning defense industry. Whites also left the rural area. In 2020, the county was 48.3% African American and 47.1% white.

Starting in 1803, sixteenth sections in each township in Mississippi were established for school purposes. These sections of land were to be used exclusively for school projects. In essence, schools were later founded on land that had been Chickasaw territory.

Two of the oldest settlements in Panola County were at Belmont and Panola, which were a few miles apart and located on opposite sides of the Tallahatchie River. For several years there was a spirited contest between these two towns to gain the county court of Panola County.

With the advent of the Mississippi and Tennessee (now the Illinois Central railroad), Belmont was absorbed by Sardis, and Panola was absorbed by Batesville. The legislature authorized two judicial districts for the county, with Sardis designated as the seat of justice for the first judicial district, and Batesville for the second judicial district.

=== Early education ===
During the early period of county formation, most education was done at home. There was no public education, and only wealthier families hired tutors or sent their sons to seminaries or academies. The informal education consisted of basic math, basic reading, and study of biblical concepts. Through the antebellum period, the state generally forbade education of slaves and free people of color.

By 1840, four small private schools with a combined student population of 92 pupils were operating in the county. Documentation has not survived about these schools. During the early 1840s, the first school‑related advertisements were published r in the county newspapers. The ads attempted to present the virtues of these early schools.

During this period, Judge James S.B. Thacher, a highly educated Bostonian, devised a popular educational program for the state of Mississippi. The proposed scheme received considerable discussion and was finally incorporated by the state legislature (March 4, 1846) into "An Act to establish a System of Common Schools."

The act "provided for a board of five school commissioners in each county, to license teachers and have charge of schools, lease the school lands and have charge of the school funds in each county." To a large degree, this act was passed because A.G. Brown, a candidate for Mississippi governor, decided to make the establishment of a general school system a campaign issue. By 1846, Governor Brown (1844‑48), succeeded in getting the Act passed.

Schools established under this rule "had no uniformity since they differed as the counties differed in wealth and efficiency of management."

Although the Act had proved to be of little assistance in Panola County, progress was being made for wealthier white students. By 1850, the seventh census in Panola County listed 18 schools and a total student population of 439 pupils (approximately four times that of the 1840 census). This census (unpublished returns) recorded that 18 individuals stated their occupation as educators or teachers. By the spring of 1854, several members of the local Shiloh community (Capt Thomas F. Wilson, Dr H. Moseley, and Jesse Smith) constructed a small log cabin to be used as the community's school house.

This school, known as the Jones' School, at first employed only one teacher. It slowly grew in size and popularity. Several years later, the facility was moved to Peach Creek, where the school was informally known as the "Greasy Smith Schoolhouse," being named for the local village blacksmith. In 1882, the facility was moved to Pleasant Grove.

== Geography ==
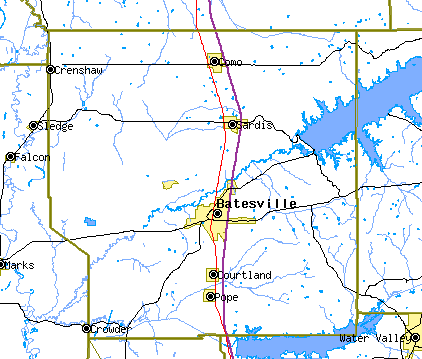
Panola County

According to the U.S. Census Bureau, the county has a total area of 705 square miles (1,830 km^{2}), of which 685 square miles (1,770 km^{2}) is land and 20 square miles (52 km^{2}) (2.8%) is water.

=== Major highways ===
- Interstate 55
- U.S. Route 51
- Mississippi Highway 3
- Mississippi Highway 6
- Mississippi Highway 35
- U.S. Route 278
- Mississippi Highway 315

=== Adjacent counties ===
- Tunica County (northwest)
- Tate County (north)
- Lafayette County (east)
- Yalobusha County (southeast)
- Tallahatchie County (southwest)
- Quitman County (west)

== Demographics ==
Historical population
Census	Pop.	Note	%±
1840	4,657		—
1850	11,444		145.7%
1860	13,794		20.5%
1870	20,754		50.5%
1880	28,352		36.6%
1890	26,977		−4.8%
1900	29,027		7.6%
1910	31,274		7.7%
1920	27,845		−11.0%
1930	28,648		2.9%
1940	34,421		20.2%
1950	31,271		−9.2%
1960	28,791		−7.9%
1970	26,829		−6.8%
1980	28,164		5.0%
1990	29,996		6.5%
2000	34,274		14.3%
2010	34,707		1.3%
2020	33,208		−4.3%
2025 (est.)	32,691	▼	−1.6%
U.S. Decennial Census; 1790-1960 1900-1990; 1990-2000 2010-2013

=== Racial and ethnic composition ===
Panola County, Mississippi – Racial and ethnic composition Note: the US Census treats Hispanic/Latino as an ethnic category. This table excludes Latinos from the racial categories and assigns them to a separate category. Hispanics/Latinos may be of any race.
Race / Ethnicity (NH = Non-Hispanic)	Pop 1980	Pop 1990	Pop 2000	Pop 2010	Pop 2020	% 1980	% 1990	% 2000	% 2010	% 2020
White alone (NH)	14,238	15,326	17,191	16,981	15,642	50.55%	51.09%	50.16%	48.93%	47.10%
Black or African American alone (NH)	13,599	14,452	16,478	16,801	16,035	48.29%	48.18%	48.08%	48.41%	48.29%
Native American or Alaska Native alone (NH)	6	31	55	70	52	0.02%	0.10%	0.16%	0.20%	0.16%
Asian alone (NH)	30	33	53	61	62	0.11%	0.11%	0.15%	0.18%	0.19%
Native Hawaiian or Pacific Islander alone (NH)	x	x	2	0	4	x	x	0.01%	0.00%	0.01%
Other race alone (NH)	8	1	0	14	35	0.03%	0.00%	0.00%	0.04%	0.11%
Mixed race or Multiracial (NH)	x	x	111	286	700	x	x	0.32%	0.82%	2.11%
Hispanic or Latino (any race)	283	153	384	494	678	1.00%	0.51%	1.12%	1.42%	2.04%
Total	28,164	29,996	34,274	34,707	33,208	100.00%	100.00%	100.00%	100.00%	100.00%

=== 2020 census ===
As of the 2020 census, the county had a population of 33,208. The median age was 40.1 years. 24.3% of residents were under the age of 18 and 17.6% of residents were 65 years of age or older. For every 100 females there were 92.7 males, and for every 100 females age 18 and over there were 89.3 males age 18 and over.

The racial makeup of the county was 47.5% White, 48.5% Black or African American, 0.2% American Indian and Alaska Native, 0.2% Asian, <0.1% Native Hawaiian and Pacific Islander, 1.0% from some other race, and 2.6% from two or more races. Hispanic or Latino residents of any race comprised 2.0% of the population.

18.9% of residents lived in urban areas, while 81.1% lived in rural areas.

There were 12,772 households in the county, of which 32.0% had children under the age of 18 living in them. Of all households, 39.8% were married-couple households, 20.5% were households with a male householder and no spouse or partner present, and 33.9% were households with a female householder and no spouse or partner present. About 29.2% of all households were made up of individuals and 12.8% had someone living alone who was 65 years of age or older.

There were 14,586 housing units, of which 12.4% were vacant. Among occupied housing units, 72.8% were owner-occupied and 27.2% were renter-occupied. The homeowner vacancy rate was 1.0% and the rental vacancy rate was 9.4%.

=== 2010 census ===
As of the 2010 United States census, there were 34,707 people living in the county. 49.4% were White, 48.6% Black or African American, 0.2% Native American, 0.2% Asian, 0.6% of some other race and 0.9% of two or more races. 1.4% were Hispanic or Latino (of any race).

=== 2000 census ===
As of the census of 2000, there were 34,274 people, 12,232 households, and 9,014 families living in the county. The population density was 50 people per square mile (19 people/km^{2}). There were 13,736 housing units at an average density of 20 units per square mile (7.7 units/km^{2}). The racial makeup of the county was 50.48% White, 48.36% Black or African American, 0.16% Native American, 0.18% Asian, 0.01% Pacific Islander, 0.41% from other races, and 0.39% from two or more races. 1.12% of the population were Hispanic or Latino of any race.

There were 12,232 households, out of which 36.10% had children under the age of 18 living with them, 48.90% were married couples living together, 19.90% had a female householder with no husband present, and 26.30% were non-families. 23.20% of all households were made up of individuals, and 10.10% had someone living alone who was 65 years of age or older. The average household size was 2.75 and the average family size was 3.25.

In the county, the population was spread out, with 29.40% under the age of 18, 10.40% from 18 to 24, 27.40% from 25 to 44, 20.80% from 45 to 64, and 12.10% who were 65 years of age or older. The median age was 33 years. For every 100 females there were 91.80 males. For every 100 females age 18 and over, there were 86.50 males.

The median income for a household in the county was $26,785, and the median income for a family was $32,675. Males had a median income of $27,359 versus $19,088 for females. The per capita income for the county was $13,075. About 21.20% of families and 25.30% of the population were below the poverty line, including 32.30% of those under age 18 and 25.20% of those age 65 or over.

== Government ==
In presidential elections, Panola County was a swing county, but trended Republican in 2016, 2020 and 2024. Donald Trump won the county in 2020, with 51.6 percent to Joe Biden's 47.4 percent.

The county's Board of Supervisors are elected from five districts. They hire a county administrator to manage daily affairs.

United States presidential election results for Panola County, Mississippi
Year	Republican		Democratic		Third party(ies)	
Year	No.	%	No.	%	No.	%
1912	13	1.53%	760	89.20%	79	9.27%
1916	29	2.25%	1,262	97.75%	0	0.00%
1920	80	8.64%	843	91.04%	3	0.32%
1924	53	3.93%	1,264	93.77%	31	2.30%
1928	142	8.30%	1,569	91.70%	0	0.00%
1932	20	1.49%	1,318	98.28%	3	0.22%
1936	3	0.20%	1,481	99.80%	0	0.00%
1940	45	2.21%	1,988	97.74%	1	0.05%
1944	90	4.45%	1,931	95.55%	0	0.00%
1948	38	1.75%	195	8.99%	1,937	89.26%
1952	1,032	33.52%	2,047	66.48%	0	0.00%
1956	519	19.73%	1,741	66.17%	371	14.10%
1960	643	22.26%	841	29.12%	1,404	48.61%
1964	4,002	90.65%	413	9.35%	0	0.00%
1968	1,098	13.77%	2,743	34.40%	4,133	51.83%
1972	5,284	70.61%	2,091	27.94%	108	1.44%
1976	3,341	36.85%	5,517	60.85%	209	2.31%
1980	4,219	39.33%	6,179	57.60%	330	3.08%
1984	5,850	51.43%	5,465	48.04%	60	0.53%
1988	5,382	50.46%	5,222	48.96%	61	0.57%
1992	4,644	40.52%	6,066	52.93%	750	6.54%
1996	3,701	38.34%	5,408	56.03%	543	5.63%
2000	5,424	47.62%	5,880	51.63%	85	0.75%
2004	6,769	50.36%	6,615	49.22%	56	0.42%
2008	7,620	46.42%	8,690	52.94%	106	0.65%
2012	7,629	45.34%	9,079	53.96%	118	0.70%
2016	7,449	49.45%	7,431	49.33%	184	1.22%
2020	8,060	51.58%	7,403	47.37%	164	1.05%
2024	8,202	56.87%	6,061	42.03%	159	1.10%

== Education ==
The elected school board selects the school superintendent. School districts include:

- North Panola School District
- South Panola School District

== Communities ==
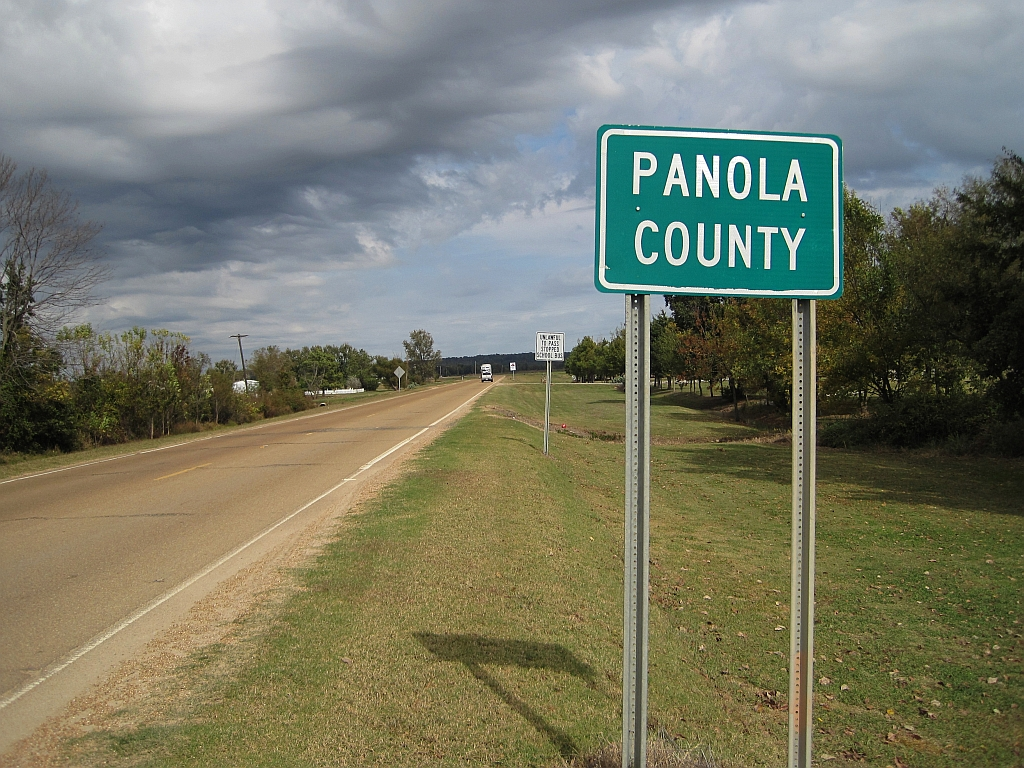
Highway sign when entering Panola County

=== City ===
- Batesville (county seat)

=== Towns ===
- Como
- Courtland
- Crenshaw (partly in Quitman County)
- Crowder (mostly in Quitman County)
- Sardis (county seat)

=== Village ===
- Pope

=== Unincorporated communities ===
- Askew
- Ballentine
- Buxton
- Curtis Station
- Glenville
- Horatio
- Locke Station‡
- Longtown
- Pleasant Grove
- Terza

=== Ghost town ===
- Tocowa

== See also ==
- National Register of Historic Places listings in Panola County, Mississippi
- Panola Partnership website
- "We Ain't What We Was", a book about the changes in the county's politics after the Civil Rights Era
