= Frank E. Shanahan Jr. =

American politician

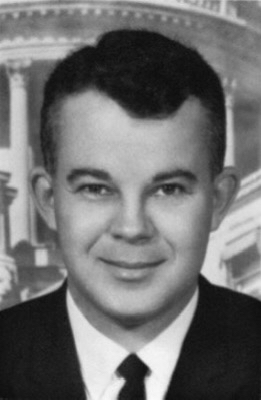

Member of the Mississippi House of Representatives
- In office 1956–1968

Personal details
- Born: August 20, 1923 Vicksburg, Mississippi, U.S.
- Died: December 12, 2007 (aged 84)

Frank E. Shanahan Jr. (August 20, 1923 – December 12, 2007) was an American politician. He served as a member of the Mississippi House of Representatives.

== Life and career ==
Shanahan was born in Vicksburg, Mississippi. He was a lawyer.

Shanahan served in the Mississippi House of Representatives from 1956 to 1968.

Shanahan died on December 12, 2007, at the age of 84.
