= Eileen Shanahan (journalist) =

American journalist

Eileen Shanahan (February 29, 1924 – November 2, 2001) was an American journalist who covered national economic policy for The New York Times from 1962 to 1977, was a high-ranking editor for newspapers located in Washington, D.C., Pennsylvania, and Florida, and was the founding editor of Governing, a magazine about state and local government. As a reporter in a male-dominated field, she faced discrimination and harassment and fought for fair treatment for women in journalism, serving as one of the named plaintiffs in a sex-discrimination lawsuit against the Times and later acting as a mentor and role model for younger women in her field.

== Early life and education ==
Shanahan was born on February 29, 1924, in Washington, D.C. Her father, Thomas Shanahan, the son of Irish immigrants, was a government worker. Her mother, Malvena, was the daughter of Leopold Karpeles, who, as a Union soldier, became one of the first Jewish people to win the Medal of Honor. Shanahan has said that her father, a socialist and militant atheist, imbued her with intellectual curiosity and a fierce drive to succeed. "We were told: achieve, achieve, achieve, achieve." Despite his many wonderful characteristics, she said, her father "was a terrible bigot" who made her ashamed of her Jewish heritage. A turning point came during her first year at George Washington University, when she was thrown out of her beloved sorority because she was part Jewish. Forced to come to terms with her identity and her father's attitudes, she said, she learned not only to judge people as individuals but also to be skeptical and to realize that "what everybody believed to be so maybe just wasn't so". This experience, she said, did more to shape her than anything in her life except her parents. During college, she worked summers as a "copyboy" at The Washington Post. Inspired by the atmosphere there, she chose journalism as her life's work and married John V. Waits Jr., a fellow student, in 1944. They had two daughters, Mary Beth Waits and Kathleen (Kate) Waits. He became a newspaper executive, and they remained married until his death in 1995.

== Journalism career ==
In the early years of her career, Shanahan worked for United Press; for Walter Cronkite, then a young radio correspondent, who hired and mentored her when many others refused to employ women; for an economics newsletter, and for The Journal of Commerce, a DC-based business newspaper, where she developed her economics beat. During the Kennedy administration she spent a year as a spokesperson for the Treasury Department before being hired into the Washington bureau of the Times as an economic correspondent. She wanted to be an editor, she recalled, but during her hiring interview with Clifton Daniel, then the Times' managing editor, she "gushed" that her only aspiration was to be a reporter at the Times. She said Daniels replied, "That's good, because I can assure you that no woman will ever be an editor at The New York Times." A self-possessed woman with a quick wit and a sometimes acid temper, she was an assertive, persistent reporter who more than held her own in the otherwise all-male preserve of Washington economics reporting at the time.

She was widely esteemed for being able to clearly explain complex information on such topics as tax policy, mutual funds and the federal budget, and she had many front-page stories. "I'm not a talented writer", she once said. "I just never turned a phrase that took anybody's breath away in my whole life. But I can work hard and think hard until I understand something so well I can explain it to almost anybody. And I care enough to do that. An awful lot of that is caring." She was particularly proud of her coverage of possible tax fraud by then-President Richard Nixon, and she also reported on the Equal Rights Amendment and other feminist efforts in the 1970s.

In 1974, despite her prominence, she learned that of 31 reporters in the Times Washington bureau, her salary was sixth from the bottom; only one man, who had decades less experience, was paid less. Around the same time, despite believing it would hurt her career, she agreed to become a named plaintiff in a class-action lawsuit begun by Times women in New York alleging longstanding patterns of discrimination in hiring, promotion, and pay. The suit was settled in 1978 after Shanahan had left the Times to serve two years as assistant secretary for public affairs at the U.S. Department of Health, Education and Welfare during the Jimmy Carter administration. She later was an assistant managing editor at The Pittsburgh Post-Gazette and The Washington Star, covered tax issues for Congressional Quarterly, became the first executive editor for Governing magazine, and spent three years with the St. Petersburg Times, finally retiring in 1994 as its Washington bureau chief.
