= Red Dragon =

Red Dragon may refer to:

== Entertainment ==
- The Red Dragon (magazine), a Welsh historical and literary magazine published 1882–1887
- Red Dragon (novel), a 1981 book by Thomas Harris
  - Manhunter (film), a 1986 film directed by Michael Mann based on the novel Red Dragon by Thomas Harris
  - Red Dragon (2002 film), a film directed by Brett Ratner based on the novel by Thomas Harris
  - Francis Dolarhyde, the fictional serial killer from the novel Red Dragon by Thomas Harris and films based on it
- Red Dragon (1965 film), the American release title of A 009 missione Hong Kong, a West German and Italian spy film directed by Ernst Hofbauer
- The Red Dragon (film), a 1946 Charlie Chan mystery film
- Red Dragon (musician) (1966–2015), Jamaican deejay, born Leroy May
- Capital South Wales, a radio station serving Cardiff, Wales formerly known as 103.2 & 97.4 Red Dragon
- Red Dragon, a fictional pirate ship from the 2017 film Pirates of the Caribbean: Dead Men Tell No Tales
- Red Dragon, 2022 album by Volturian
- Red Dragon, a fused mash-up version of the characters Liu Kang and Kano in Mortal Kombat 1
- Red Dragon, a fictional character from Brave Animated Series by Yellow Book

=== Games and sports ===
- Cortland Red Dragons, athletic teams of SUNY Cortland
- Red Dragon (role-playing fiction), a Japanese tabletop game, role-playing fiction and art phenomenon
- Red dragon (Dungeons & Dragons), a type of dragon in the Dungeons & Dragons roleplaying game
- reDRagon, a professional wrestling tag team
- Wargame: Red Dragon, 2014 real-time strategy video game
- A mahjong tile with a red Chinese character for "center" (中) on it

== Technology ==
- SpaceX Red Dragon, a canceled robotic lander mission to Mars by SpaceX
- Red Dragon (1595), a 16th-century English gun ship
- The Red Dragon (train), a British express train 1950–1965
- Red Dragon, a professional cinema camera of Red Digital Cinema Camera Company

== Other ==
- Red Dragon (Ambazonian militia), a separatist militia in the breakaway state of Ambazonia (Southern Cameroons)
- "The great red dragon", Satan as described in Revelation 12:3
- The Great Red Dragon paintings, a series of paintings by William Blake
- Red Dragon Society, a secret society at New York University
- A red Chinese dragon
- Grand Grimoire, a black magic grimoire, also known as The Red Dragon
- Welsh Dragon, a national symbol of Wales. Thus, "red dragon" in Welsh culture may refer to:
  - The flag of Wales
  - Y Fenni cheese, a Welsh cheese, also known as "Red Dragon" when coated in red wax
- Chinese Dragon God of the south and of the essence of summer

== See also ==
- Legend of the Red Dragon, an online BBS game
- Bad Dragon
- Dragon (disambiguation)
- Great red dragon (disambiguation)
- Red (disambiguation)
