= Will Graham (character) =

- Hannibal Lecter character
- Hugh Dancy as Will Graham in the TV series Hannibal
- Portrayed by: William Petersen (Manhunter); Edward Norton (Red Dragon); Hugh Dancy (Hannibal)

In-universe information
- Gender: Male
- Occupation: FBI profiler
- Significant others: Molly Foster Graham; Hannibal Lecter (TV series)
- Nationality: American

Will Graham is a fictional character and protagonist of Thomas Harris' 1981 novel Red Dragon. Graham is also the protagonist of two film adaptations of the novel, Manhunter (1986) and Red Dragon (2002), and the television series Hannibal (2013–2015), which adapted various parts of the Hannibal Lecter franchise.

In Red Dragon, Graham is introduced as an intellectually gifted and highly esteemed former FBI profiler who has the ability to empathize with psychopaths, to the detriment of his own psyche.

Graham is responsible for the capture of Hannibal Lecter, a forensic psychiatrist and cannibalistic serial killer who nearly kills Graham during their first encounter. The incident severely traumatizes Graham, who then retires from the FBI. During the events of Red Dragon, Graham reluctantly comes out of retirement to find and apprehend a serial killer known as "The Tooth Fairy," requiring him to confront and seek assistance from the incarcerated Lecter.

Other than passing mentions in Harris' sequel The Silence of the Lambs, Graham does not appear in any other book of the Lecter series. In the films Manhunter and Red Dragon, he is portrayed by William Petersen and Edward Norton, respectively. In the television series Hannibal, he is portrayed by Hugh Dancy.

== Character overview ==
In his original appearance and its adaptations, Graham is an FBI profiler responsible for the capture of serial killer Hannibal Lecter, and later assigned to capture serial killer Francis Dolarhyde. Graham is depicted as being intellectually gifted, skilled in criminology, and possessing extraordinary empathy. His empathy manifests as the ability to assume the point of view of criminals and psychopaths so he can vividly construct the mentality and motives of such individuals, even with limited data. This level of insight makes him adept at tracking down violent criminals, but also leaves him extremely disturbed; he fears that he understands psychopaths because he is one himself. He also has an eidetic memory to rival Lecter's and at one point suffered from encephalitis, which he got from his great-aunt.

== Appearances ==
=== Novel ===
Red Dragon establishes Graham's backstory. He grew up poor in Louisiana, eventually moving to New Orleans, where he became a homicide detective. He leaves New Orleans to attend graduate school in forensic science at George Washington University. After attaining his degree, Graham goes to work for the FBI's crime lab. Following exceptional work both in the crime lab and in the field, Graham is given a post as teacher at the FBI Academy. During his career in the FBI, Graham is given the title of 'Special Investigator' while he is in the field.

His first major case involves a serial killer nicknamed the "Minnesota Shrike", who preys on female college students. He catches the killer, Garrett Jacob Hobbs, at the suspect's home, in the process of trying to murder his own family. Graham finds Hobbs' wife on the apartment landing, bleeding from multiple stab wounds, who clutches at Graham before dying. Graham breaks down the door and shoots Hobbs, who is repeatedly stabbing his own daughter in the neck. Hobbs' daughter survives and eventually goes on with her life. Graham is profoundly disturbed by the incident and is referred to the psychiatric ward of Bethesda Naval Hospital. After a month in the hospital, he returns to the FBI.

In 1975, he tracks down another serial killer nicknamed the "Chesapeake Ripper", who surgically removes his victims' edible organs. He notices that a victim with multiple stab wounds has a healed stab wound; according to his medical records, the said victim received the wound in a hunting accident five years before. He tracks down the doctor who treated the victim in the emergency room, Dr. Hannibal Lecter, now a renowned psychiatrist, to interview him about the patient. During their first meeting, Lecter claims not to remember very much. Graham returns to see Lecter in his office, and within minutes realizes that Lecter is the killer he seeks. Graham goes to Lecter's outer office and makes a phone call to the FBI's Baltimore Field Office. Lecter, who has removed his shoes, sneaks up on Graham and slashes his abdomen with a linoleum knife, nearly disemboweling him. FBI agents and Maryland State Troopers arrive and arrest Lecter, and Graham spends months recovering in a hospital. It was only after a while in the hospital that he realized what had tipped him off—the antique medical diagram Wound Man, whose wounds match exactly those of the Ripper's victim. Graham's capture of Lecter makes him a celebrity, and he is revered as a legend at the FBI. A tabloid reporter, Freddy Lounds, sneaks into the hospital where Graham is recuperating, photographs Graham's wounds, and humiliates him in the National Tattler. Traumatised by the experience, Graham retires from the FBI shortly after his recovery.

In 1980, Graham is living with his wife Molly, whom he met a year after the incident with Lecter, and her son Willy in Sugarloaf Key, Florida. His former boss, Jack Crawford, persuades him to come out of retirement and help the FBI catch a serial killer nicknamed the "Tooth Fairy", who had murdered two families on a lunar cycle, the first in Birmingham, Alabama and the second in Atlanta, Georgia. After studying the crime scenes, Graham consults Lecter, now institutionalized in the Baltimore State Hospital for the Criminally Insane, on the case. Lecter only taunts him, however, and later sends Graham's address to the killer, Francis Dolarhyde, in code, threatening the safety of his wife and stepson. The family are moved first to a cottage owned by Crawford's brother, but Molly later decides to take Willy to stay with her late first husband's parents in Oregon. Graham resumes tracking Dolarhyde and uses Lounds in an attempt to break the coded communication between Lecter and Dolarhyde by giving Lounds false information, insinuating that Dolarhyde is impotent, homosexual and the product of incest. Enraged, Dolarhyde kidnaps and brutally murders Lounds. After linking him to a film developing company, Graham, Crawford, and FBI agents arrive at Dolarhyde's home to arrest him, only to find that the killer had set it on fire with his blind girlfriend, Reba McClane, inside, apparently shooting himself as part of a forced suicide pact. Graham rescues McClane from the burning house and consoles her, returning home, believing Dolarhyde's reign of terror to be over.

However, Dolarhyde's apparent suicide is revealed to have been a ruse; he shot a previous victim in the face, fooling McClane and the policemen at the scene into thinking he was dead. Dolarhyde attacks Graham and his family at their Florida home, stabbing Graham in the face before being killed by Graham's wife Molly, who unloads their revolver into him. Graham survives, but is left with disfiguring facial scars and implicit irrecoverable psychological damage. Soon afterward, he receives a note from Lecter sardonically wishing him "a speedy convalescence" and hoping Graham "won’t be very ugly", which Crawford destroys.

Will Graham is briefly referred to in The Silence of the Lambs, the sequel to Red Dragon, when FBI Academy student Clarice Starling notes that "Will Graham, the keenest hound ever to run in Crawford's pack, was a legend at the Academy; he was also a drunk in Florida now with a face that's hard to look at..." Crawford tells her that "[Graham's] face looks like damned Picasso drew it." When Starling first meets Lecter, he asks her how Graham's face looks. Before Lecter's escape, Dr. Frederick Chilton tells him that Crawford is not happy that Lecter "cut up his protégé", referencing Graham.

=== Films ===
Graham has been portrayed twice in film: in Manhunter by William Petersen and again in Red Dragon by Edward Norton.

The depiction of Graham in Manhunter is faithful to the character as presented in the original novel, with some notable alterations. In the novel, Graham is married to Molly and is stepfather to Molly's son, Willy. In Manhunter, Graham and Molly (Kim Greist) have a son named Kevin, with the film making no indication Kevin is not Graham's biological son. It also changes somewhat his relationship with Lecter, here spelled "Lecktor" (Brian Cox); while in the book Graham only consults with Lecter once, in this film he talks to Lecktor over the phone to better understand Dolarhyde, here spelled "Dollarhyde" (Tom Noonan). The film also changes the ending of the novel: in Manhunter, Graham saves Reba McClane (Joan Allen) from Dollarhyde affirmatively attempting (albeit reluctant) to murder her, and kills him in a tense standoff.

The 2002 film version of Red Dragon changes the nature of Graham's connection to Lecter (Anthony Hopkins). While in the novel he meets Lecter for the first time while questioning him about the death of a patient, in the film he and Lecter have apparently known each other for some time, with Graham often consulting Lecter on his cases. He talks with Lecter about the latest serial killer he is investigating, a cannibal, and intuits that Lecter is the killer he seeks after finding a recipe in Lecter's house that includes all the organs taken from the killer's victims. In contrast with the novel, in this film Graham meets with Lecter several times. Unlike Manhunter, the film changes Graham's climactic battle with Dolarhyde (Ralph Fiennes) only a little; while the confrontation between the two results in both of them being critically wounded by gunfire, his face is left unharmed, and it is Graham's wife Molly (Mary-Louise Parker) who kills Dolarhyde by shooting him in the head as he gets up to kill them. It is implied in the closing scene that, although pushed psychologically beyond his limits, his life and marriage endured. The 2002 adaptation portrays Graham and Molly as having a biological child, Josh (Tyler Patrick Jones), rather than Graham being a stepfather.

=== TV series: Hannibal ===
Hugh Dancy portrayed Graham in Hannibal, a television series about his relationship with Hannibal Lecter (Mads Mikkelsen) prior to Lecter's capture. Graham develops a complex bond with Lecter while working with him to solve other serial murders, before uncovering Lecter's crimes. The show premiered on April 4, 2013.

Dancy's version of Graham is described in-universe as "closer to Asperger's [syndrome] and autistics than to psychopaths", but series creator Bryan Fuller has refuted the idea that he has Asperger syndrome, stating instead that he has "the opposite of" the disorder; Hugh Dancy thinks that Will developed defensive mechanisms for his empathy disorder which resemble some autistic traits. Dancy's Graham possesses "pure empathy" and an overactive imagination, allowing him to mentally recreate the murders he is investigating. He also unknowingly suffers from advanced encephalitis, often making it difficult for him to cope with his mental recreations. Lecter is fascinated by Graham's ability to think like the serial killers he investigates, and he spends much of the series trying to manipulate him into becoming a killer himself.

==== Season 1 ====
At the start of the series, Graham teaches forensics at the FBI Academy. He left field work due to stress and lives alone in Wolf Trap, Virginia with several stray dogs he adopted. Graham and consulting psychiatrist Hannibal Lecter are enlisted by Special Agent Jack Crawford (Laurence Fishburne) to hunt serial killer Garrett Jacob Hobbs (Vladimir Cubrt), the "Minnesota Shrike". Graham finds and kills Hobbs to save his daughter Abigail (Kacey Rohl). This is the first time Graham has killed someone, and the experience haunts him. Graham fears that he may have enjoyed killing Hobbs, and goes into therapy with Lecter to better understand his ability to empathize with psychopaths.

Graham and Lecter develop paternal feelings for Abigail, and try to help her recover from her traumatic experience. They attempt to shield her from Crawford, who suspects she aided her father's crimes, and from tabloid reporter Freddie Lounds (Lara Jean Chorostecki), who wishes to exploit her story. When Graham discovers that Abigail killed the brother of one of Lecter's victims (unbeknownst to Graham) and subsequently hid the murder with Lecter's assistance, he struggles with the revelation, but covers for both of them, believing it to have been self-defense and wanting to protect them. Graham briefly pursues a romantic relationship with his friend and colleague, Dr. Alana Bloom (Caroline Dhavernas), but she turns him down because of his instability.

Throughout the season, Graham's sanity deteriorates from the toll of more murder cases and undiagnosed encephalitis, causing sleepwalking, hallucinations, fugue states, and mild seizures. Lecter manipulates Graham to exacerbate his symptoms until it appears that he murdered and disposed of Abigail in a state of psychosis after realizing she helped her father choose and stalk his victims. Graham surrenders himself to his colleagues, but once new evidence appears framing him for several murders Lecter committed, he escapes custody and has Lecter take him to the Hobbs' abandoned residence, where Abigail is presumed to have been killed. There, Graham deduces that Lecter is the Chesapeake Ripper, the serial killer he has been hunting all along, and presumes that he murdered Abigail as well. Lecter challenges Graham to kill him, but Graham is non-fatally shot and recaptured by Crawford first. Back in custody, Graham's encephalitis is diagnosed and he is incarcerated, while Lecter remains free.

The method with which Graham discerns Lecter's identity as the Chesapeake Ripper in the novels' universe (i.e., talking to Lecter regarding a murder victim's injuries and discovering his Wound Man diagram during their first meeting) is instead attributed to an FBI trainee named Miriam Lass (Anna Chlumsky), who went missing during an investigation prior to the start of the show: Lecter had attacked her before she could tell anyone, and it is revealed in season 2 that he has been holding her hostage and brainwashing her since then in order to misdirect the FBI's investigation away from him.

==== Season 2 ====
At the start of the second season, Graham is institutionalized at the Baltimore State Hospital for the Criminally Insane, under the care of Frederick Chilton (Raúl Esparza). He is awaiting trial after being framed for the murders committed by Lecter. Lecter's gaslighting and the evidence used to frame Graham have left him unsure if his suspicions about Lecter are correct, or if he is projecting guilt onto Lecter due to his own psychosis. Graham's doubts are allayed after recovering repressed memories of Lecter's manipulations and abuse, and a visit by Lecter's own psychiatrist and fellow victim, Dr. Bedelia Du Maurier (Gillian Anderson), who assures Graham that she believes him.

While preparing to stand trial, Graham insists to his skeptical former colleagues that Lecter is the real killer, while pulling strings from the confines of his cell to expose him. Beverly Katz (Hettienne Park), Graham's friend and a crime scene investigator, agrees to investigate Lecter in exchange for Graham's help on new murder cases. Katz eventually comes to believe Graham, and breaks into Lecter's home to find more evidence, but Lecter murders her, putting her dissected corpse on public display. After Lecter admonishes Graham for Katz's death, and subtly threatens Alana's life, Graham persuades a deranged hospital orderly (Jonathan Tucker) to make an ultimately unsuccessful attempt on Lecter's life. The incident alienates Bloom from Graham, as she sees it confirming his alleged derangement and transformation into a murderer. Lecter begins a sexual relationship with Bloom, creating another rift between her and Graham.

Lecter exonerates Graham by purposely leaving forensic evidence from Graham's alleged victims at the scene of one of his own murders, leading to Graham's release. Graham returns to work and reconciles with Hannibal, asking to resume his therapy sessions to understand his own dark side better. Lecter quickly becomes aware that this is part of an elaborate ruse between Graham and Crawford to entrap him, but is fascinated by the experience and allows it to continue to explore the connection he feels with Graham and guide him into genuinely becoming a serial killer.

In an attempt to push Graham into becoming a killer, Lecter sends Randall Tier (Mark O'Brien), a psychotic former patient, to kill Graham. However, Graham kills and mutilates Tier instead – just as Lecter had hoped he would. Later, Graham attacks Freddie Lounds after she trespasses on Will's property and discovers Tier's preserved remains. He and Lecter share a meal of what appears to be her flesh: however, it is subsequently revealed that Lounds is alive and is working with Graham and Crawford to draw Lecter out and capture him – the human flesh they consumed belonged in fact to Tier rather than Lounds. However, Graham finds himself drawn into his "alliance" act with Lecter and conflicted about his true allegiances.

Graham and Lecter also acquire a mutual enemy in Mason Verger (Michael Pitt), a wealthy sadist whom they both despise for emotionally and sexually abusing his twin sister Margot (Katharine Isabelle). When Mason threatens to cut her off financially unless she conceives a "Verger baby" with him, a desperate Margot sleeps with Graham and gets pregnant. Lecter tells Mason, who is in therapy with him, that she is attempting to conceive an heir to the Verger family fortune, so Mason removes her womb. An enraged Graham confronts Mason and warns him that Lecter is manipulating both of them. He saves Lecter from being fed to Mason's prize pigs, and finds Lecter holding Mason captive in his house. He does nothing to stop Lecter from "encouraging" Mason – to whom he has given hallucinogenic drugs – to cut off pieces of his own face and feed them to Graham's dogs. With Graham's unspoken approval, Lecter breaks Mason's neck with his bare hands, leaving him paralyzed from the neck down.

Crawford and Graham plan to entrap Lecter by encouraging him to attempt to kill Crawford during dinner at Lecter's residence. The night before, Lecter suggests to Graham that the two of them leave the country immediately, start a new life together and forgo their plan to kill Crawford. After consideration, Graham insists they go through with killing Crawford instead.

Graham learns that he is about to be arrested for helping Crawford entrap Lecter, as well as for Tier's murder. He calls Lecter and informs him that "they know", hoping Lecter will flee. He arrives at Lecter's house to find a severely injured Alana laying in the front of the house, having been pushed out of a third story window, and that Crawford has also been severely wounded trying to arrest Lecter. Graham is stunned to discover that Abigail is alive and was the one who threw Alana out of a window after Lecter instructed her to do so. Lecter holds Graham’s face in his hands, tenderly staring into his eyes and delivers the iconic line "We couldn't leave without you." before he stabs Graham stomach and guts him with a linoleum knife, Lecter explains that he faked Abigail's death to protect her from arrest; if Graham had accepted his offer to leave the country together, she would have accompanied them. Lecter tells Graham that he forgives him for his betrayal before asking if Graham will be able to offer him the same, then slits Abigail's throat, leaving them to bleed to death, with the police arriving shortly thereafter.

==== Season 3 ====
While Abigail dies, Graham survives and recovers from his wounds after several months. Graham goes after Lecter, going first to the latter's childhood home in Lithuania. There, he meets Lecter's family servant Chiyoh (Tao Okamoto) and kills the man who had, decades earlier, murdered and cannibalized Lecter's sister Mischa. Graham proceeds to mutilate the body and turn it into a Lecter-esque work of art. Chiyoh then helps him find Lecter in Florence, Italy. Graham meets with Lecter and tries to kill him, but Chiyoh shoots and wounds him before he can kill the doctor. Lecter takes Graham back to his villa and tries to perform a craniotomy on him in front of Crawford, but he is interrupted by corrupt Italian detectives in Mason Verger's (Joe Anderson) pay, who apprehend them both and deliver them to the Verger estate in Maryland. Mason plans to torture Lecter to death with the help of his physician Cordell Doemling (Glenn Fleshler). Meanwhile, Mason orders Doemling to surgically remove Graham's face – without anaesthesia – and graft it onto his. Before the face transplant can take place, however, Lecter is freed by his former partner and colleague Alana Bloom, on the pretense that he writes a letter confessing to killing Mason Verger, while in actuality Alana and Margot are the ones to kill him, kills Doemling and saves Graham. Lecter carries an unconscious Graham to safety and brings him back to his home. Graham refuses to have anything more to do with Lecter, rejecting him completely, but allows him to escape. Later that evening, however, Lecter surrenders to Crawford to spite Graham, knowing that if Graham knows where he is, he will inevitably see him again and they will be reunited.

Three years later, Graham has retired from the FBI and settled down with his wife, Molly (Nina Arianda), and her son, Walter. Crawford asks him to profile a serial killer dubbed "The Tooth Fairy", who kills entire families. After some initial reluctance, Graham agrees to help and decides to consult Lecter about the murders. With Lecter's help, he recovers his gift for empathizing with psychopaths – at the cost of having nightmares in which he, as the killer, murders his family. Lecter says that the killer feels a connection with the William Blake painting The Great Red Dragon and the Woman Clothed with the Sun, and suggests that Graham see the painting to better understand the man he is chasing. Graham goes to the Brooklyn Museum to see the painting, and encounters the killer, Francis Dolarhyde (Richard Armitage), who attacks him. Lecter gives Dolarhyde Graham's address, and Dolarhyde attacks Graham's family, shooting and wounding Molly as she and Walter escape.

To steer Dolarhyde away from his family, Graham decides to enrage him by giving an interview to Lounds in which he says "The Tooth Fairy" is ugly, impotent and the product of incest. He uses Chilton as an authoritative source for his profile; Dolarhyde then kidnaps, mutilates and burns Chilton.

In the series finale, "The Wrath of the Lamb", Dolarhyde apparently kills himself, and Graham comforts the killer's girlfriend, Reba McClane (Rutina Wesley). It turns out that Dolarhyde faked his death, however, and attacks Graham in his hotel room. With the help of Bloom and Crawford, Graham secures a deal to set a trap for Dolarhyde using Lecter as bait. Graham seems to arrange for Lecter to be transferred to another facility to draw Dolarhyde out; however, Dolarhyde attacks and kills Lecter's guard detail and allows Lecter and Graham to escape together. Lecter takes Graham to a cliffside cottage where he had kept Abigail Hobbs and Miriam Lass. Dolarhyde, who had followed them to the cottage, shoots Lecter in the back and stabs Graham in the face. Graham and Lecter get the upper hand and kill Dolarhyde together, with Lecter tearing out his throat with his teeth and Graham gutting him with a knife. They embrace, romantically and Graham pulls them both over the cliff. A post-credits scene shows Lecter's former psychiatrist and accomplice Bedelia Du Maurier (Gillian Anderson) dining on her own leg at a table set for three; Fuller has said this is meant to suggest that Graham and Lecter have survived. Fuller has further stated that, should the series be renewed for another season, Lecter and Graham would be on the run from the FBI in Cuba.

==== Relationship between Graham and Lecter ====
The emotional relationship between Graham and Lecter forms the foundation of the series. In season 3, their developing queer romance has been taken from subtext into text. As to whether it was a part of the initial plan to portray their relationship as romantic, Fuller stated: "No, it naturally evolved because I guess I was absorbing so much of Mads and Hugh's performance, which felt like it was growing in intimacy, and it would have been inauthentic not to address it. Because all of these characters, and particularly Bedelia, was able to call out what she had witnessed [between Lecter and Graham], it seemed like a natural conclusion. I remember when I turned in the rewrite pages where Will asks Bedelia if Hannibal is in love with him, I got a note from Don Mancini, one of our writers who was always pushing for more homosexual text – not just context or subtext but text, text, text – and he was like, "I'm so glad you put that in there! They said it! They said it!"

Discussing what motivated him to verbally acknowledge the romance between Graham and Lecter, Fuller said, "It felt like we had to shit or get off the pot, ultimately, because there had been so much going on between these two men that when Will asks, "Is Hannibal Lecter in love with me?" it is very much about death and the romance between these two men. There is a quality to connections that go above and beyond sexuality. You can have this intimate connection with somebody that then causes you to wonder where the lines of your own sexuality are. And we didn't quite broach the sexuality. It was certainly suggested, but the love is absolutely on the table."

Remembering how the song for the finale of the series – "Love Crime" by Siouxsie Sioux – was created, Fuller said: "It was interesting. She [Siouxsie Sioux] was like, "I want to write this song, and what are the things I should really be thinking about?" And I was like, 'this is a love story. A love story between a full-fledged psychopath and someone who has nascent psychopathic abilities.' Actually, Hannibal Lecter is not a psychopath; he's something else entirely. But it's a love relationship between two men: one of them is a cannibal, and one of them understands those cannibalistic instincts all too well."

== Reception ==
ScreenRant ranked Graham as one of the most likeable characters in the early seasons of the television series.
