= Great Red Dragon =

Great Red Dragon may refer to:

- A character in the Book of Revelation
- The Great Red Dragon paintings, a series of paintings by William Blake
- Great Red Dragon, an alter ego of the fictional character Francis Dolarhyde in the novel Red Dragon by Thomas Harris
- Great Red Dragon, a fictional character in the comic book series Bone
- "The Great Red Dragon", an episode of the television series Hannibal
- "The Great Red Dragon", an episode of the television series The Mentalist

== See also ==
- Red dragon (disambiguation)
