= Tom Noonan =

American actor and director (1951–2026)

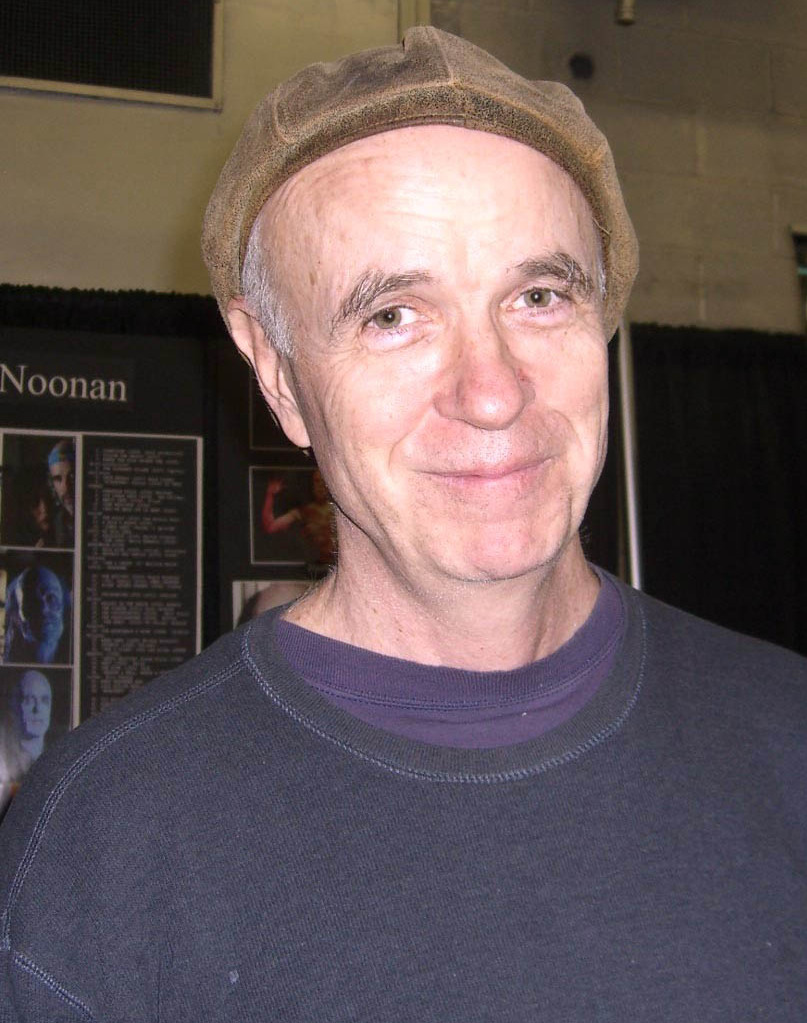
- Noonan in 2009
- Born: Thomas Patrick Noonan; April 12, 1951; Greenwich, Connecticut, U.S.
- Died: February 14, 2026 (aged 74); Englewood, New Jersey, U.S.
- Occupations: Actor; director; screenwriter
- Years active: 1978–2018
- Spouse(s): Karen Young (m. 1992; div. 1999) Talia Lugacy (m. 2010–2015)
- Children: 2
- Relatives: John Ford Noonan (brother)

Thomas Patrick Noonan (April 12, 1951 – February 14, 2026) was an American actor, director and screenwriter, best known for his roles as Francis Dollarhyde in Manhunter (1986), Frankenstein's Monster in The Monster Squad (1987), Cain in RoboCop 2 (1990), The Ripper in Last Action Hero (1993), Kelso in Heat (1995), Sammy Barnathan in Synecdoche, New York (2008), Mr. Ulman in The House of the Devil (2009), Reverend Nathaniel in Hell on Wheels (2011–2014), the Pallid Man in 12 Monkeys (2015–2018), and as the voice of everyone but Michael and Lisa in Anomalisa (2015).

Noonan was also a writer and director of theatre and film. His debut feature film as a filmmaker, What Happened Was... (1994), won the Dramatic Grand Jury Prize and Screenwriting Award at the Sundance Film Festival.

== Early life ==
Thomas Patrick Noonan was born on April 12, 1951, in Greenwich, Connecticut, the son of Rita (McGannon), a mathematics teacher, and John Noonan Sr., a jazz musician and doctor of dental surgery. He had an older brother, John Ford Noonan, an actor, playwright, and screenwriter, and two sisters, Barbara and Nancy. Noonan was a very talented basketball player, and said "playing basketball is how I learned to perform in a lot of ways. It's how I got interested in performing... I never acted as a kid. I never did school plays. I never acted until I was 27...you learn a lot when you're in front of people and you've got a crowd going and you're doing something that you love to do. A lot of the skills that you would need for acting come through that... It's like a life and death struggle in front of people that you hope to impress."

== Career ==
Noonan started working in theatre (appearing in the original Off-Broadway production of Sam Shepard's play Buried Child), but in the 1980s he began working in film. At 6 ft 5 in (1.96 m) tall, Noonan's imposing presence was probably responsible for his tendency to be cast as menacing villains, as in RoboCop 2, Last Action Hero, Manhunter, and The Pledge. His height was used to comic effect in "The Moving Finger", the series finale of the horror anthology Monsters (several episodes of which he also directed and wrote).

In 1986, Noonan played Francis Dollarhyde, a serial killer who kills entire families, in Michael Mann's Manhunter, the first movie to feature Hannibal Lecter. Another supporting role, and another collaboration with Mann was in 1995, as Kelso in Heat. He also played the Frankenstein monster in The Monster Squad and drug kingpin Cain in RoboCop 2. During the 1990s, he wrote various plays, including two that he made into movies, What Happened Was... (1994) and The Wife (1995). In the 2000s, Noonan appeared in several other movies, including Charlie Kaufman's directorial debut, as Sammy Barnathan in Synecdoche, New York.

Noonan also made numerous appearances in television series, including The X-Files (in the much-praised 1996 episode "Paper Hearts" that was written specifically for him), Law & Order: Criminal Intent, Law & Order: Special Victims Unit, Tales from the Darkside, and CSI: Crime Scene Investigation, (in which he starred alongside William Petersen, who played his nemesis, Will Graham, in Manhunter), and Detective Victor Huntley in Damages. He appeared on Blacklist as The Stew Maker, Louie as a doctor who takes the young Louie through the crucifixion in graphic anatomical detail. He also portrayed the Reverend Nathaniel Cole in the AMC original series Hell on Wheels.

In 2015, Noonan voiced all of the supporting characters in Duke Johnson and Charlie Kaufman's stop-motion comedy-drama film Anomalisa, for which he won the San Diego Film Critics Society Award for Best Supporting Actor.

== Death ==
Noonan died at a hospital in Englewood, New Jersey, on February 14, 2026, at the age of 74. His death was initially announced by actress Karen Sillas on her Instagram account, and later confirmed by Fred Dekker in a tribute on Facebook.

== Filmography ==
=== Film ===
Year	Title	Role	Notes
1980	Willie & Phil	Man In Park	
1980	Gloria	2nd Man - Gangster	
1980	Heaven's Gate	Jake	
1981	Wolfen	Ferguson	
1983	Eddie Macon's Run	Daryl Potts	
1983	Easy Money	Paddy	
1984	Best Defense	Frank Holtzman	
1985	The Man with One Red Shoe	Reese	
1985	Tom Goes to the Bar	Unknown	Short film
1986	F/X	Varrick	
1986	Manhunter	Francis Dollarhyde	
1987	The Monster Squad	Frankenstein's Monster	
1989	Collision Course	Scully	
1989	Mystery Train	Man in Arcade Diner	Segment: "A Ghost"
1990	RoboCop 2	Cain / RoboCain	
1993	Last Action Hero	Ripper / Tommy Noonan	
1994	What Happened Was...	Michael	Also writer, director, editor and composer
1995	Heat	Kelso	
1995	The Wife	Jack	Also writer, director, editor and composer
1998	Phoenix	Chicago	
1999	The Astronaut's Wife	Jackson McLaren	
1999	Wang Dang	Mickey Hounsell	Unreleased; also writer and director
2000	The Opportunists	Mort Stein	
2000	The Photographer	Butler	
2001	The Pledge	Gary Jackson	
2001	Knockaround Guys	Sheriff Decker	
2001	Bullet in the Brain	Anders	Short film
2002	Eight Legged Freaks	Joshua Taft	Uncredited
2003	The Egoists	Bryon Bradley	
2003	Madness and Genius	Frank Donovan	
2004	Hair High	Principal	Voice
2005	The Roost	Horror Host	
2005	They're Made Out of Meat	Duncan	Short film
2006	Seraphim Falls	Minister Abraham	
2007	Snow Angels	Mr. Chervenick	
2008	The Alphabet Killer	Ray Gullikson	
2008	Synecdoche, New York	Sammy Barnathan	
2009	The House of the Devil	Mr. Ulman	
2010	Follow the Prophet	Brother John	
2010	The Rendezvous	—N/a	Writer
2012	The Pilgrim & The Private Eye	Leche	Short film
2012	Skinhead Requiem	Priest	Short film
2014	Late Phases	Father Roger Smith	
2014	The Shape of Something Squashed	Douglas Whymper	Also writer and director
2015	Anomalisa	Everyone else	Voice
2017	Wonderstruck	Older Walter	

=== Television ===
Year	Title	Role	Notes
1980	Rage!	Bo	Television film
1984	Tales from the Darkside	Bill Lacey	Episode: "The Odds"
1989	The Equalizer	Brandon Thorton	Episode: "Making of a Martyr"
1991	Red Wind	—N/a	Television film; writer and producer
1991	The Ten Million Dollar Getaway	Mr. Y	Television film
1991	Monsters	Howard Mitla	Episode: "The Moving Finger"; Also wrote and directed two episodes
1994	Heaven and Hell: North and South, Book III	Will Fenway	3 episodes
1996	Early Edition	Frank Price	Episode: "Pilot"
1996	The X-Files	John Lee Roche	Episode: "Paper Hearts"
2000	The Beat	Howard Schmidt	13 episodes
2002	CSI: Crime Scene Investigation	Zephyr	Episode: "Abra Cadaver"
2003	Law & Order: Criminal Intent	Malcolm Bryce	Episode: "Graansha"
2004	The Jury	Marty McMahon	Episode: "The Honeymoon Suite"
2005	Jonny Zero	Chucky	Episode: "No Good Deed"
2007	Kidnapped	Gibson	Episode: "Do Unto Others"
2008	Law & Order: Special Victims Unit	Jake Berlin	Episode: "Confession"
2009–2011	Damages	Detective Victor Huntley	17 episodes
2010	Louie	Dr. Haveford	Episode: "God"
2011	The Cape	Preston Holloway	2 episodes
2011	Bar Karma	Caleb	Episode: "Man Walks Out of a Bar"
2011–2014	Hell on Wheels	Reverend Nathaniel Cole	17 episodes
2013–2014	The Blacklist	The Stewmaker	2 episodes: "The Stewmaker", "The Decembrist"
2014	How and Why	Man in Black Parka	Pilot
2014	The Leftovers	Casper	Episode: "The Guest"
2015–2018	12 Monkeys	Pallid Man	18 episodes
2016	Horace and Pete	Tom	3 episodes
2016	Quarry	Oldcastle	3 episodes
2017	Dimension 404	Bob	Voice; Episode: "Bob"
2018	Animals.	Phil's Dad	Voice; Episode: "The Democratic People's Republic of Kitty City"
