= Red 7 =

American rock band (1984–1987)

- Origin: San Francisco, California, US
- Genres: Rock
- Years active: 1984–1987
- Label: MCA
- Past members: Michael Becker; Gene Stashuk; Paul Revelli

Red 7 was a short-lived rock group, formed in 1984 in San Francisco, California. British musician Mike Rutherford produced their first album, played bass on several songs and may have also sung in the choir on one song, "The Way". The three core members were Michael Becker, Gene Stashuk and Paul Revelli. Don Gehmann mixed the single "Relentless" from the first CD, David Tickle was the engineer.

== History ==
Red 7 recorded two albums. Their self-titled debut Red 7 was released in 1985 (MCA LP MCA-5508). Two cuts from that album were used in popular movies: "Less Than Perfect" was featured in the soundtrack to Joe Dante's 1985 film, Explorers (Explorers: Music from the Motion Picture Soundtrack, MCA LP MCA-6148). Arguably their best-known song, "Heartbeat", was featured in Michael Mann's 1986 thriller Manhunter, as well as an episode of Miami Vice (produced by Mann).

The second album, When the Sun Goes Down (MCA LP MCA-5792) was released in 1987.

The band lost their contract to MCA soon after the second album.

After the demise of Red 7, the members scattered to various corners of the country. Gene Stashuk currently owns and operates Apostrophe Music Studios in Washington State, where he produces and engineers a wide variety of contemporary music, rock to classical. With his own group, euGENE WENDELL, he has produced three CDs (euGENE WENDELL, Islands in the Sun and euGENE WENDELL 3). He is also a FOH mixer at many local music festivals and events.

Paul Revelli continues to produce music and play drums in the San Francisco Bay Area. He has appeared with a variety of artists including Elvis Costello and Chuck Prophet. He currently plays with the blues group Bey Paule Band.

Michael Becker returned to his home state of New Jersey.

== Discography ==
=== Studio albums ===
Title	Album details
Red 7	Release date: January 24, 1985; Label: MCA Records
When the Sun Goes Down	Release date: May 12, 1987; Label: MCA Records

=== Singles ===
- 1985: "Less Than Perfect"
- 1985: "Heartbeat"
- 1985: "Relentless"
- 1987: "I'm on Your Side"

== Other links ==
1. "Red 7" on Amazon
2. "Red 7" on iTunes
