= Manhunter (film) =

1986 film by Michael Mann

- Theatrical release poster
- Directed by: Michael Mann
- Screenplay by: Michael Mann
- Based on: Red Dragon by Thomas Harris
- Produced by: Richard Roth
- Starring: William Petersen; Kim Greist; Joan Allen; Brian Cox; Dennis Farina; Stephen Lang; Tom Noonan
- Cinematography: Dante Spinotti
- Edited by: Dov Hoenig
- Music by: Michel Rubini; The Reds
- Production company: Red Dragon Productions
- Distributed by: De Laurentiis Entertainment Group
- Release date: August 15, 1986
- Running time: 120 minutes
- Country: United States
- Language: English
- Budget: $14–15 million
- Box office: $8.9 million

Manhunter is a 1986 American crime thriller film written and directed by Michael Mann. Based on the 1981 novel Red Dragon by Thomas Harris, the film stars William Petersen as FBI profiler Will Graham, Tom Noonan as serial killer Francis Dollarhyde, Dennis Farina as Graham's FBI superior Jack Crawford, and Brian Cox as incarcerated killer Hannibal Lecktor. The film focuses on Graham coming out of retirement to lend his talents to an investigation on Dollarhyde, a killer known as the Tooth Fairy. In doing so, he must confront the demons of his past and meet with Lecktor, who nearly killed Graham years before.

The film focuses on the forensic work carried out by the FBI to track down killers and shows the long-term effects that cases like this have on profilers such as Graham, highlighting the similarities between him and his quarry. It features heavily stylized use of color to convey this sense of duality, and the nature of the characters' similarity has been explored in academic analysis of the film. It was the first film adaptation of Red Dragon, as well as the first film adaptation of any of Harris's Hannibal Lecter novels in general.

Manhunter was released in the United States on August 15, 1986, by De Laurentiis Entertainment Group. It was considered a box-office bomb at the time of its release, making only $8.6 million in the United States, and received mixed reviews from critics.

== Plot ==
Will Graham, a former FBI criminal profiler, retired following a mental breakdown after being attacked by serial killer Dr. Hannibal Lecktor, whom he captured. His former FBI superior Jack Crawford visits him at his Florida home to seek help with a new serial killer case. Promising his wife that he will only find evidence and not risk physical harm, Graham agrees to visit the most recent crime scene in Atlanta, where he tries to enter the mindset of the killer, dubbed the Tooth Fairy by the police for the bite marks left on his victims.

Having successfully suggested where to find the killer's fingerprints, Graham meets with Crawford. They are accosted by tabloid journalist Freddy Lounds. Graham visits Lecktor, a former psychiatrist, in his secure cell and asks for his insight into the killer's motivations. Lecktor agrees to look at the case file. Later, Lecktor obtains Graham's home address by deceit while ostensibly making a phone call to his attorney.

Graham travels to the first crime scene in Birmingham, Alabama. He is contacted by Crawford, who patches Graham through to Frederick Chilton, Lecktor's warden, who has found a note in Lecktor's personal effects. They realize it is from the Tooth Fairy, expressing admiration for Lecktor and an interest in Graham. Crawford brings Graham to Washington, where a missing section of the note is analyzed to determine what Lecktor removed. They discover an instruction to communicate through the personals section of the National Tattler, Lounds's newspaper.

The FBI intends to plant a fake advertisement to replace Lecktor's, but without the proper book code the Tooth Fairy will know it is fake. They let the advertisement run as it is and Graham organizes an interview with Lounds, giving a false and derogatory profile of the Tooth Fairy to incite him. A sting operation fails to catch the killer. Lounds is kidnapped by the Tooth Fairy and forced to tape-record a statement. He is set on fire in a wheelchair and rolled into the parking garage of the National Tattler as a warning.

The FBI decodes Lecktor's coded message to the Tooth Fairy: it is Graham's home address with an instruction to kill Graham and his family. Graham rushes home to find his family safe but terrified. After the FBI moves Graham's family to a safe house, he explains to his stepson Kevin why he retired previously.

At his job in a St. Louis film lab, Francis Dollarhyde—the Tooth Fairy—approaches a blind co-worker, Reba McClane, and offers her a ride home. They go to Dollarhyde's home, where Reba is oblivious to the fact that Dollarhyde is watching home-movie footage of his planned next victims. The following night, Graham realizes the Tooth Fairy's murders are driven by a desire for acceptance. Meanwhile, Dollarhyde watches Reba being escorted home by another co-worker. Misinterpreting their interaction, he murders the man and abducts Reba.

Searching for a connection between the murdered families, Graham realizes that the killer must have seen their home movies; he brought bolt cutters to a home that had a padlock in a home video which had since been removed. Graham and Crawford identify the lab in St. Louis where the films were processed. After determining which employees matched the killer's description, he and Crawford travel with a police escort to Dollarhyde's home. Inside, Dollarhyde prepares to kill Reba with a piece of glass. Seeing that Dollarhyde has someone with him, Graham lunges through a window. He is subdued by Dollarhyde, who retrieves a shotgun and shoots two police officers and injures Crawford. Wounded in the firefight, Dollarhyde returns to the kitchen, where he is killed by Graham. Reba, Graham, and Crawford are tended to by paramedics, and Graham returns home to his family after checking on the Sherman family.

== Cast ==
- William Petersen as FBI Agent Will Graham. Richard Gere, Mel Gibson and Paul Newman were considered for the role, but Mann cast Petersen after seeing footage from To Live and Die in L.A. Petersen spent time with officers of the Chicago Police Department researching for his role. Additionally, Petersen had a small role as a bouncer in Mann's 1981 film Thief.
- Tom Noonan as Francis Dollarhyde, whose name is spelled differently from the novel's "Dolarhyde." Noonan credits his ability to improvise during rehearsals for his casting. He took up bodybuilding to prepare physically for the part. He began preparation for his role by studying other serial killers, but quickly rejected this approach. While shooting the film, Noonan remained in character at all times, keeping away from cast members playing his pursuers.
- Dennis Farina as FBI Agent Jack Crawford. Farina had already worked with Mann before, making his acting debut in the 1981 film Thief before starring in Crime Story and in several episodes of Miami Vice. Farina had already read the novel Red Dragon, and was called to audition at the same time as Brian Cox.
- Brian Cox as Dr. Hannibal Lecktor. Actors John Lithgow, Mandy Patinkin, and Brian Dennehy, and director William Friedkin were also considered for the part of Lecktor, whose name was changed from the novel's "Lecter." Cox based his performance on Scottish serial killer Peter Manuel. Cox was asked to audition with his back turned to the casting agents, as they felt they needed to focus on the power of his voice when considering him for the part.
- Kim Greist as Molly Graham. Greist has previously worked with Mann on an episode of Miami Vice.
- Joan Allen as Reba McClane. In preparation for her role, Allen spent time with the New York Institute for the Blind, learning to walk through New York blindfolded. She had previously worked with co-star William Petersen on stage, in the 1980 Steppenwolf Theatre Company production of Balm in Gilead.
- Stephen Lang as Freddy Lounds. Lang had previously starred in Band of the Hand, on which Mann was executive producer. He went on to appear in the Mann-produced Crime Story with Farina and in Mann's 2009 film Public Enemies.

== Production ==
=== Pre-production ===
The film was originally going to be called Red Dragon, like the novel. Michael Mann, who called the new title "inferior," said that producer Dino De Laurentiis made the change after Michael Cimino's film Year of the Dragon, produced by De Laurentiis, bombed at the box office in 1985. William Petersen has commented that another reason for the change was to avoid any suggestion that it might be a martial arts film. Brian Cox, who played jailed killer Hannibal Lecktor, has also expressed disdain for the film's title, calling it "bland" and "cheesy." The word manhunter appeared in Stephen King's influential review of the Red Dragon novel published by The Washington Post in late 1981.

David Lynch was an early consideration for the director's role, having still been under contract to De Laurentiis after making Dune. However, Lynch rejected the role after finding the story to be "violent and completely degenerate."

William Petersen worked with the Chicago Police Department Violent Crimes Unit and the FBI Violent Crimes Unit in preparation for the role of Will Graham, talking to the officers and reading some of their crime files. He spoke to the investigators on the Richard Ramirez case about how they coped with the effects these disturbing cases had on them and how they learned to "compartmentalize" their working and personal lives. "Of course you don't really turn it off," he recalled. "At the end of the day, even if you're just a regular policeman, it takes a toll."

During the three years he spent working on the script, Michael Mann also spent time with the FBI's Behavioral Science Unit, where he claimed to have met people very like the character of Will Graham. This level of research led Brent E. Turvey to describe the film as "one of the most competent blends of cutting-edge forensic science and criminal profiling at the time." Mann also spent several years corresponding with imprisoned murderer Dennis Wayne Wallace. Wallace had been motivated by his obsession for a woman he barely knew, and believed that Iron Butterfly's "In-A-Gadda-Da-Vida" was "their song." This connection inspired Mann to include the song in the film.

Tom Noonan, who played killer Francis Dollarhyde, initially researched other serial killers to study for the role, but was repulsed by it. He then decided to play the character with the sense that he felt he was doing right by his victims, not harming them. "I wanted to feel this guy was doing the best he could," Noonan explained, "that he was doing this out of love." Noonan credits his casting to improvisation during his audition, recalling that he was reading lines alongside a young woman. During a reading of the scene featuring the torture of Freddy Lounds, Noonan noticed that the woman began to seem frightened, and deliberately tried to scare her more. He believed that this is what secured the role for him.

Joan Allen, who played Dollarhyde's blind love interest Reba McClane, recalls meeting with representatives of the New York Institute for the Blind in preparation for her role. She spent time walking around New York wearing a mask over her eyes to get accustomed to walking as though she were blind.

John Lithgow, Mandy Patinkin, William Friedkin, and Brian Dennehy were all considered for the role of Hannibal Lecktor, but Brian Cox was cast after being recommended to Mann by Dennehy. Cox based his portrayal on Scottish serial killer Peter Manuel, who he said "didn't have a sense of right and wrong." Cox has also suggested that his selection was due to his nationality, claiming that characters who are "a little bit nasty" are best played by Europeans. Mann kept the role of Lecktor very short, believing that it was "such a charismatic character that [he] wanted the audience almost not to get enough of him." For the role of Will Graham, De Laurentiis had expressed interest in Richard Gere, Mel Gibson and Paul Newman, but Mann, having seen footage of William Petersen's role in To Live and Die in L.A., championed Petersen for the part.

=== Filming ===
Petersen has claimed in an interview that one of the film's scenes forced the crew to adopt a guerrilla filmmaking approach. The scene in which Petersen's character Will Graham falls asleep while studying crime scene photographs during a flight required the use of an airplane during shooting. Michael Mann had been unable to gain permission to use a plane for the scene and booked tickets for the crew on a flight from Chicago to Florida. Once on board, the crew used their equipment, checked in as hand luggage, to shoot the scene quickly, while keeping the plane's passengers and crew mollified with Manhunter crew jackets.

Cinematographer Dante Spinotti made strong use of color tints in the film, using a cool "romantic blue" tone to denote the scenes featuring Will Graham and his wife, and a more subversive green hue, with elements of purple or magenta, as a cue for the unsettling scenes in the film, mostly involving Dollarhyde. Petersen has stated that Mann wanted to create a visual aura to bring the audience into the film, so that the story would work on an interior and emotional level. Mann also made use of multiple frame rates in filming the climactic shootout: different cameras recording the scene at 24, 36, 72 and 90 frames per second, giving the final scene what Spinotti has called an "off-tempo" and "staccato" feel.

I was really wound up. I was doing 50 push-ups between each take, and we were doing take after take.

— Noonan on filming his role as the Tooth Fairy

During principal photography, Noonan asked that no one playing his victims and pursuers be allowed to see him, while those he did speak to should address him by his character's name, Francis. The first time Noonan met Petersen was when Petersen jumped through a large window during the filming of the climactic fight scene. Noonan admits that, because of his request, the atmosphere on set became so tense that people actually became afraid of him.

He had begun body-building to prepare for the role and felt that his size intimidated the crew when filming began, as the first scene to be shot was his character's interrogation and murder of another. Noonan claims that this led him to take separate flights and stay in separate hotels from the rest of the cast. While on the film's sets, he would remain in his trailer alone in the dark to prepare himself, sometimes joined by a silent Mann.

Petersen recalled filming the climactic shoot-out scene at the end of principal photography, when most of the crew had already left the production because of time constraints. With no special effects crew to provide the blood spatter for the gunshots, Petersen described how the remaining crew would blow ketchup across the set through hoses when such effects were needed. Joan Allen related that Mann simulated the impacts of bullets in Dollarhyde's kitchen by throwing glass jars across the surfaces so they would shatter where he needed them to. One of these broken jars left a shard of glass embedded in Petersen's thigh during filming. The pool of blood forming around Noonan's character at the end of this scene was intended to allude to the "Red Dragon" tattoos worn by the character in the novel. This shot left Noonan lying in the corn syrup stage blood for so long that he became stuck to the floor.

Ted Levine, who later played Buffalo Bill in The Silence of the Lambs, crashed Manhunter's wrap party to spend time with Petersen, whom he knew from their days in Chicago theater. Levine was later invited to audition for Crime Story as a result of meeting Mann at this party.

=== Post-production ===
Spinotti has commented on how Mann's use of mise en scène when framing shots evokes "the emotional situation in the film at that particular time," noting the director's focus on the particular shape or color of elements of the set. He has also drawn attention to the scene in which Graham visits Lecktor in his cell, pointing out the constant position of the cell bars within the frame, even as the shots cut back and forth between the two characters. "There is nothing in Manhunter ... which is just a nice shot," says Spinotti. "[It] is all focused into conveying that particular atmosphere; whether it's happiness, or delusion, or disillusion." This "manipulation of focus and editing" has become a visual hallmark of the film.

Despite having initially filmed the scenes involving Francis Dollarhyde with an elaborate tattoo across Noonan's chest, Mann and Spinotti felt that the finished result seemed out of place and that it "trivialize[d] the struggle" the character faced. Mann cut the scenes in which the character appeared bare-chested, and quickly re-shot additional footage to replace what had been removed. Spinotti noted that in doing so, scenes which he felt had been captured with a "beautiful" aesthetic were lost, as the production did not have the time to recreate the original lighting conditions.

Petersen had difficulty ridding himself of the Will Graham character after principal photography wrapped. While rehearsing for a play in Chicago, he felt the old character "always coming out" instead of his new role. To try and rid himself of the character, Petersen went to a barbershop where he had them shave his beard, cut his hair and dye it blond so that he could look into the mirror and see a different person. At first, he felt it was due to the rigorous shooting schedule for Manhunter, but later realized that the character "had creeped in."

== Soundtrack ==
Manhunter (Music from the Motion Picture Soundtrack)

Soundtrack album by various artists
- Released: 1986
- Length: 43:29
- Label: MCA

Manhunter's soundtrack "dominates the film," with music that is "explicitly non-diegetic the entire way." Steve Rybin has commented that the music is not intended to correlate with the intensity of the action portrayed alongside it, but rather to signify when the viewer should react with a "degree of aesthetic distance" from the film, or be "suture[d] into the diegetic world" more closely. The soundtrack album was released in limited quantities in 1986, on MCA Records (#6182). It was not, however, released on compact disc at the time, but only on cassette tape and vinyl record.

In March 2007, a two-CD set titled Music from the Films of Michael Mann was released, featuring four tracks from Manhunter: The Prime Movers' "Strong As I Am," Iron Butterfly's "In-A-Gadda-Da-Vida," Shriekback's "This Big Hush," and Red 7's "Heartbeat." In March 2010, Intrada Records announced that they were releasing the Manhunter soundtrack on CD for the first time, with an extra track, "Jogger's Stakeout" by The Reds.

The Reds were contacted about contributing to the film's soundtrack after submitting their music for possible use on Miami Vice. They recorded their score over a period of two months, in studios in Los Angeles and New York City. They recorded 28 minutes of music for the film. Several cues were replaced later with music by Shriekback and Michel Rubini. "Comfortably Numb" by Pink Floyd and "I Had Too Much to Dream (Last Night)" by The Electric Prunes have both been cited by The Reds' vocalist Rick Shaffer as influences on the film's soundtrack. Mann selected "Strong as I Am" by The Prime Movers for the film and later funded the filming of a music video for the song's release as a single. Red 7's "Heartbeat", which plays at the end of the film, had previously been used in the Mann-produced Miami Vice (the 21st episode of season one, "Nobody Lives Forever", which guest-starred Kim Greist, later to appear in Manhunter).

No.	Title	Writer(s)	Length
1.	"Strong as I Am"	The Prime Movers	4:37
2.	"Coelocanth"	Shriekback	4:19
3.	"This Big Hush"	Shriekback	6:13
4.	"Graham's Theme"	Michel Rubini	4:00
5.	"Evaporation"	Shriekback	3:18
6.	"Heartbeat"	Red 7	3:52
7.	"Lector's Cell"	The Reds	1:48
8.	"Jogger's Stakeout"	The Reds	2:05
9.	"Leed's House"	The Reds	4:32
10.	"In-A-Gadda-Da-Vida"	Iron Butterfly	8:20
Total length:			43:29

Music in the film's screen credits which are not listed above were never included until the release of the double LP on Waxwork Records in July 2018:

No.	Title	Writer(s)	Length
1.	"Freeze"	Klaus Schulze	6:42
2.	"Seiun + Hikari No Sono"	Kitarō	8:00
Total length:			14:42

== Themes ==
The use of heavily tinted scenes was a deliberate technique to evoke different moods in the audience. Top: Will and Molly Graham are lit with Spinotti's "romantic blue." Bottom: Francis Dollarhyde sits in "subversive" green.

Visually, Manhunter is driven by strong color cues and the use of tints, including the hallmark blue of Mann's work. Dante Spinotti has noted that these visual cues were meant to evoke different moods based on the tone of the scenes in which they were used: cool blue tones were used for the scenes shared between Will Graham and his wife Molly, and unsettling greens and magentas were used for the scenes with the killer Francis Dollarhyde.

Steven Rybin has observed that "blue is associated with Molly, sex, and the Graham family home," while green denotes "searching and discovery," pointing out the color of Graham's shirt when the investigation begins and the green tone of the interior shots in the Atlanta police station. John Muir suggests that this helps identify the character of Graham with the "goodness" of the natural world, and Dollarhyde with the city, "where sickness thrives." This strongly stylized approach drew criticism from reviewers at first, but has since been seen as a hallmark of the film and viewed more positively.

Academic studies of the film tend to draw attention to the relationship between the characters of Graham and Dollarhyde, noting, for example, that the film "chooses to emphasize the novel's symbiotic relationships between Graham, Lecter [sic] and Dolarhyde [sic] by visual techniques and screen acting where subtlety plays a key role." In his book Hearths of Darkness: The Family in the American Horror Film, Tony Williams praises the depth of the film's characterizations, calling Dollarhyde a "victim of society" and his portrayal "undermining convenient barriers between monster and human."

Philip L. Simpson echoes this sentiment in his book Psycho Paths: Tracking the Serial Killer through Contemporary American Film, calling Manhunter a "profoundly ambiguous and destabilizing film" which creates "uncomfortable affinities between protagonist and antagonist." Mark T. Conard's The Philosophy of Film Noir follows this same idea, claiming that the film presents the notion that "what it takes to catch a serial killer is tantamount to being one."

== Release ==
=== Box office ===
Manhunter was released in the United States on 15 August 1986. It opened in 779 theaters and grossed $2,204,400 in its opening weekend. The film eventually grossed a total of $8,620,929 in the US, making it the 76th highest-grossing film that year. Because of internal problems at De Laurentiis Entertainment Group, the UK premiere was postponed for over a year. It was screened in November 1987 as part of the London Film Festival, and saw wide release on 24 February 1989. In France, Manhunter was screened on 9 April at the 1987 Cognac Festival du Film Policier, where it was awarded the Critics Prize. It was also shown at the 2009 Camerimage Film Festival in Łódź, Poland. On 19 March 2011, it was screened at Grauman's Egyptian Theatre in Hollywood to celebrate the 25th anniversary of its release. Michael Mann was present for discussion at the event.

In June 2026, it was announced that Manhunter would get a new 4K restoration titled Manhunter: The Final Cut. The cut, which was overseen and approved by Mann, was released in U.S. theaters on July 24, 2026 and in U.K. cinemas on September 25, 2026.

=== Home media ===
Manhunter was released in a widescreen edition on laserdisc in 1986. It was released on VHS several times, including by BMG in October 1998 and by Universal Studios in 2001. It has been available on DVD in various versions. Anchor Bay released a two-DVD limited, numbered, edition in 2000, disc one being the Theatrical version and extras, disc two being the "Director's Cut." An individual release of the first disc [Theatrical version] from the two-disc set was released at the same time. In 2003 Anchor Bay released the "Restored Director's Cut," overseen by Mann, which is very close to the "Director's Cut" on the 2000 disc but omits one scene. It features a commentary track by Mann.

MGM, current holders of the rights to The Silence of the Lambs and Hannibal, released the theatrical cut of Manhunter on DVD in a pan-and-scan format in 2004. In January 2007, the same version was released by MGM in a widescreen format, for the first time on DVD, as part of The Hannibal Lecter Collection, along with The Silence of the Lambs and Hannibal. Manhunter was also released by itself in September 2007. The studio re-released The Hannibal Lecter Collection on Blu-ray in September 2009. In 2016, Shout! Factory released both the theatrical and director's cut on Blu-ray.

The film is expected be released on Ultra HD Blu-ray by Vinegar Syndrome on November 27, 2026, featuring both the theatrical and director's cut.

== Reception ==
=== Contemporary response ===
On its release, Manhunter was met with mixed reviews. At first, it was seen as too stylish, owing largely to Mann's 1980s trademark use of pastel colors, art-deco architecture and glass brick. A common criticism in the initial reviews was that the film overemphasized the music and stylistic visuals. Petersen's skill as a lead actor was also called into question. Particularly critical of the film's stylistic approach was The New York Times, which called attention to Mann's "taste for overkill," branding his stylized approach as "hokey" and little more than "gimmicks." Chicago Tribune writer Dave Kehr remarked that Mann "believes in style so much that he has very little belief left over for the characters or situations of his film, which suffers accordingly," adding that the film's focus on style serves to "drain any notion of credibility" from its plot.

Sheila Benson of the Los Angeles Times was critical of the film's visuals and soundtrack, comparing it unfavourably with Miami Vice and describing it as a "chic, well-cast wasteland" that "delivers very little." The film's stylistic similarity to Miami Vice was also pointed out by Film Threat's Dave Beuscher, who felt it was the chief reason for the film's poor box office results. Writing for the San Francisco Chronicle, Steve Winn derided the film, claiming its lack of a strong lead role caused it to "fall apart like the shattered mirrors that figure in the crimes." Time was more favorable in its review, praising the "intelligent camerabatics" and "bold, controlled color scheme." Leonard Maltin gave the film three out of four stars, calling it "gripping all the way through and surprisingly nonexploitive", although adding that "the holes start to show through" if looked for "too carefully". Manhunter was, however, nominated for the 1987 Edgar Award for Best Motion Picture.

=== Later re-evaluation ===
Modern appreciation of the film has seen its standing among critics improve. Salon.com called Mann's original the best of the Lecter series, and Slate magazine described it as "mesmerizing", positing that it directly inspired television series such as Millennium and CSI: Crime Scene Investigation, though calling attention to its "Miami-Vice-like overreliance on synthesized sludge." The Independent called it "the most aestheticised film of the 1980s", and noted its "chilly integrity". British television channel Channel 4 called it "the most refined screen adaptation of Harris's books", although they found the film's contemporary soundtrack "dated." Sky Movies echoed this sentiment, summing up their review by saying "although it still remains a classic, the film has dated slightly".

Retrospective reviews tend to be less critical of the stylized visuals: the BBC's Ali Barclay called the film "a truly suspenseful, stylish thriller", awarding it four out of five, and Nathan Ditum described it in Total Film as "complex, disturbing and super-stylish", adding that the 2002 remake could not compete with it. Empire editor Mark Dinning gave the film five out of five, praising the "subtlety" of the acting and the "neon angst" of the visuals. Dinning also said that, compared to The Silence of the Lambs, Manhunter was "arguably the finer hour for cinema's most alluring psychopath". Television channel Bravo named Dollarhyde's interrogation of Freddy Lounds as one of its 30 Even Scarier Movie Moments in 2007, and Noonan's portrayal of Dollarhyde was praised by Simon Abrams of UGO Networks as "a highlight of his career."

Despite the low gross on its initial release, Manhunter grew in popularity by the 2000s and has been mentioned in several books and lists of cult films. These reappraisals often cite the success of The Silence of the Lambs and its sequels as the reason for the increased interest in Manhunter, while still favoring the earlier film over its successors. On the review aggregator website Rotten Tomatoes, 82% of 120 critics' reviews are positive, with an average rating of 7.6/10. The website's consensus reads: "Michael Mann introduces audiences to Hannibal Lecter for the first time in Manhunter, a modish thriller that fleshes out Thomas Harris's heinous creations with an elegant, chilling detachment." Metacritic, which uses a weighted average, assigned the film a score of 75 out of 100, based on 22 critics' reviews.

Audiences polled by CinemaScore gave the film an average grade of "B" on an A+ to F scale.

== Legacy ==
Manhunter's focus on the use of forensic science in a criminal investigation has been cited as a major influence on several films and television series that have come after it—most notably CSI: Crime Scene Investigation, also featuring William Petersen, which was "inspired, or at least influenced" by the forensics scenes in Manhunter. Petersen's sympathetic portrayal of profiler Will Graham has also been noted as helping to influence a "shift in the image of the pop-culture FBI agent" that would continue throughout the 1980s and 1990s. The film has also been noted as a thematic precursor to the series Millennium, John Doe, Profiler, and The X-Files, and to films such as Copycat, Switchback, The Bone Collector, Seven and Fallen.

The Silence of the Lambs, a film adaptation of Harris' next Lecter novel, was released in 1991. However, none of the cast of Manhunter reprise their roles in the later film, although actors Frankie Faison and Dan Butler appear in both films as different and unrelated characters. The Silence of the Lambs was followed in turn by a sequel: Hannibal; two prequels: Red Dragon, and Hannibal Rising; and two television series: CBS's Clarice, and NBC's Hannibal.

Of these later films, Red Dragon (2002), adapted from the same novel as Manhunter, was released to a generally positive critical reception and successful box office receipts, making $209,196,298 on a $78 million budget. Based on 2000s reviews, Red Dragon currently has a 69% rating from 191 reviews on Rotten Tomatoes, and a 60% rating based on 36 reviews on Metacritic. Manhunter's cinematographer Dante Spinotti also served as the director of photography on this version.

== See also ==
- The Great Red Dragon Paintings
- Offender profiling in popular culture
- List of cult films
- List of films featuring home invasions
