= Hannibal Lecter =

Character created by Thomas Harris

- Hannibal Lecter character
- Anthony Hopkins as Lecter in the 1991 film The Silence of the Lambs
- First appearance: Red Dragon (1981)
- Created by: Thomas Harris
- Portrayed by: Brian Cox (Manhunter); Anthony Hopkins (The Silence of the Lambs, Hannibal, Red Dragon); Gaspard Ulliel (Hannibal Rising); Aaran Thomas (young; Hannibal Rising); Mads Mikkelsen (Hannibal); John Partridge (The Silence of the Lambs—play)

In-universe information
- Aliases: Lloyd Wyman; Dr. Fell; Mr. Closter
- Nicknames: Hannibal the Cannibal; The Chesapeake Ripper
- Gender: Male
- Titles: Dr. Hannibal Lecter; Count Hannibal Lecter VIII
- Occupation: Psychiatrist; Surgeon (former)
- Family: Count Lecter (father); Simonetta Lecter (née Sforza) (mother); Mischa Lecter (younger sister)
- Significant others: Lady Murasaki; Rachel DuBerry; Clarice Starling (novels); Alana Bloom (TV series); Will Graham (TV series); Bedelia Du Maurier (TV series)
- Relatives: Count Robert Lecter (uncle); Lady Murasaki (aunt-by-marriage); Balthus (cousin)
- Nationality: Lithuanian-American

Hannibal Lecter is a fictional character created by American novelist Thomas Harris. Lecter is a cannibalistic serial killer and former forensic psychiatrist; after his incarceration, he is consulted by FBI agents Will Graham and Clarice Starling to help them find other serial killers.

Lecter first appeared in a small role as a villain in Harris' 1981 thriller novel Red Dragon, which was adapted into the film Manhunter (1986), with Brian Cox as Lecter (spelled "Lecktor"). Lecter had a larger role in The Silence of the Lambs (1988); the 1991 film adaptation starred Anthony Hopkins as Lecter, for which he won the Academy Award for Best Actor. Hopkins reprised the role for the 2001 adaptation of the 1999 novel Hannibal, which sees Lecter evading recapture, and for a second adaptation of Red Dragon in 2002.

The fourth novel, Hannibal Rising (2006), explores Lecter's childhood and development into a serial killer. He was played in the 2007 film adaptation by Gaspard Ulliel. In the NBC television series Hannibal (2013–2015), which focuses on Lecter's relationship with Graham, Lecter was played by Mads Mikkelsen, who won the Saturn Award for Best Actor on Television for his performance.

In 2003, Lecter, as portrayed by Hopkins, was named the greatest villain in American cinema by the American Film Institute. In 2010, Entertainment Weekly named him one of the 100 greatest characters of the preceding 20 years. In 2019, Lecter, as portrayed by Mikkelsen, was named the 18th-greatest villain in television history by Rolling Stone.

== Inspiration ==
Working as a journalist for Argosy magazine in the 1960s, Harris traveled to Mexico to interview an American mental patient, Dykes Askew Simmons, who was being detained at Nuevo León State Prison in Monterrey for three murders. While jailed, Simmons had been shot by a prison guard, once in each calf, and he was treated by a skilled "prison-doctor" whom Harris had referred to as "Dr. Salazar". Harris described him as a "small, lithe man with dark red hair" who "stood very still" with "a certain elegance about him"; their interview eventually took a dark turn, Harris said, when Salazar started talking about "the nature of torment". A prison guard later informed Harris that Salazar was, in fact, a convicted murderer who could "package his victim in a surprisingly small box". Salazar inspired Harris to create a character with a "peculiar understanding of the criminal mind".

Doctor Alfredo Ballí Treviño, a convicted murderer, was the inspiration for Lecter.

Salazar is believed to be Alfredo Ballí Treviño, the last criminal to be condemned to death in Mexico, in 1959. Ballí was a surgeon and physician from an upper-class family who had murdered his colleague and lover, Jesus Castillo Rangel. Ballí had held a towel soaked in chloroform over Rangel's face, causing him to lose consciousness; Ballí then transferred the body to an adjacent bathroom where he slit Rangel's throat and drained his body completely of blood before dismembering his corpse. Ballí is suspected of killing and dismembering several hitchhikers in the countryside during the late 1950s and early 1960s. Harris incorporated some of these details into Buffalo Bill's development as a killer in The Silence of the Lambs.

In her book Evil Serial Killers, Charlotte Greig asserts Lecter was inspired at least in part by the serial killer Albert Fish. Greig also states that, to explain Lecter's pathology, Harris borrowed the possibly apocryphal story of serial killer and cannibal Andrei Chikatilo's brother Stepan being kidnapped and eaten by starving neighbors. The location of the book Hannibal was inspired by the Monster of Florence and, while preparing the book, Harris traveled to Italy and was present at the trial of the main suspect, Pietro Pacciani.

== Character ==
Hannibal Lecter is a cannibalistic serial killer, who was born in Lithuania. A child of Lithuanian nobility and of the Visconti and Sforza families of Italy, he is highly intelligent and cultured, with refined tastes and impeccable manners. He is deeply offended by rudeness, and often kills people who exhibit bad manners; according to the novel Hannibal, he "prefers to eat the rude". Hopkins described Lecter as the "Robin Hood of killers", who kills "the terminally rude".

In the novel Red Dragon, the protagonist, Will Graham, says that psychologists refer to Lecter as a sociopath "because they don't know what else to call him". Graham says "he has no remorse or guilt at all", and tortured animals as a child, but he does not exhibit any of the other criteria traditionally associated with sociopathy. Asked how he himself would describe Lecter, Graham responded, "he's a monster. I think of him as one of those pitiful things that are born in hospitals from time to time. They feed it, and keep it warm, but they don't put it on the machines and it dies. Lecter is the same way in his head, but he looks normal and nobody could tell."

In The Silence of the Lambs, Lecter's keeper, Dr. Frederick Chilton, claims that Lecter is a "pure sociopath" ("pure psychopath" in the film adaptation). In the film adaptation of The Silence of the Lambs, protagonist Clarice Starling says of Lecter, "They don't have a name for what he is." Lecter's pathology is explored in greater detail in Hannibal and Hannibal Rising, which explains that he was traumatized as a child in Lithuania in 1944 when he witnessed his beloved sister, Mischa, being murdered and cannibalized by a group of deserting Lithuanian Hilfswillige, one of whom claimed that Lecter unwittingly ate his sister as well.

All media in which Lecter appears portray him as intellectually brilliant, cultured and sophisticated, with refined tastes in art, music and cuisine. He is frequently depicted preparing gourmet meals from his victims' flesh, the most famous example being his admission that he once ate a census taker's liver "with some fava beans and a nice Chianti" (a "big Amarone" in the novel). Prior to his capture and imprisonment, he was a member of Baltimore's social elite, and a sitting member of the Baltimore Philharmonic Orchestra's board of directors.

In the novel The Silence of the Lambs, Lecter is described through Starling's eyes: "She could see that he was small, sleek; in his hands and arms she saw wiry strength like her own." The novel also reveals that Lecter's left hand has a rare condition called mid-ray duplication polydactyly, i.e. a duplicated middle finger. In Hannibal, he performs plastic surgery on his own face on several occasions, and removes his extra digit. Lecter's eyes are a shade of maroon, and reflect the light in "pinpoints of red". He has small white teeth and dark, slicked-back hair with a widow's peak. He also has a keen sense of smell; in Red Dragon, he immediately recognizes Will Graham by his brand of aftershave, and in The Silence of the Lambs, he is able to identify through a plexiglass window with small holes the brand of perfume that Starling wore the day before. He has an eidetic memory with which he has constructed in his mind an elaborate "memory palace" to relive memories and sensations in rich detail.

According to The Guardian, before The Silence of the Lambs, films portrayed psychopathic killers as "claw-handed bogeymen with melty faces and rubber masks. By contrast, Lecter was highly intelligent with impeccable manners." Anthony Hopkins, the actor most closely identified with Lecter, said he played him as "ultra sane, very still ... He has such terrifying physical power, and he doesn't waste an ounce of energy. He's so contained. He's all brain." His performance was inspired by HAL 9000 from Stanley Kubrick's 2001: A Space Odyssey. The critic Roger Ebert elaborated on this comparison: "He is a dispassionate, brilliant machine, superb at logic, deficient in emotions." In the same essay, Ebert wrote:

One key to the film's appeal is that audiences like Hannibal Lecter...He may be a cannibal, but as a dinner party guest he would give value for money (if he didn't eat you). He does not bore, he likes to amuse, he has his standards, and he is the smartest person in the movie... He bears comparison, indeed, with such other movie monsters as Nosferatu, Frankenstein... King Kong and Norman Bates. They have two things in common: They behave according to their natures, and they are misunderstood. Nothing that these monsters do is "evil" in any conventional moral sense, because they lack any moral sense. They are hard-wired to do what they do. They have no choice. In the areas where they do have choice, they try to do the right thing.

== Appearances ==
=== Novels ===
==== Red Dragon ====
In the backstory of the 1981 novel Red Dragon, FBI profiler Will Graham interviews Lecter about one of his patients who was murdered by a serial killer, before intuiting that Lecter is the culprit; he sees the antique medical diagram "Wound Man" in Lecter's office, and remembers that the victim suffered the same injuries depicted in the drawing. Realizing that Graham is on to him, Lecter creeps up behind Graham and stabs him with a linoleum knife, nearly disemboweling him.

Graham survives, but is so traumatized by the incident that he takes early retirement from the FBI. Lecter is charged with a series of nine murders, but is found not guilty by reason of insanity. He is institutionalized in the Baltimore State Hospital for the Criminally Insane under the care of Dr. Frederick Chilton, a pompous, incompetent psychologist whom he despises, and who subjects him to a series of petty cruelties.

Some years later, Graham comes out of retirement and consults Lecter in order to catch another serial killer, Francis Dolarhyde, known by the nickname "the Tooth Fairy". Through the classifieds of a tabloid called The National Tattler, Lecter provides Dolarhyde with Graham's home address; Dolarhyde later uses this information to break into Graham's home, stab him in the face, and threaten his family before Graham's wife Molly shoots him dead. At the end of the novel, Lecter sends Graham a letter, saying that he hopes Graham "won't be very ugly".

==== The Silence of the Lambs ====
In the 1988 sequel The Silence of the Lambs, Lecter assists FBI agent-in-training Clarice Starling in catching a serial killer, Jame Gumb, known by the nickname "Buffalo Bill". Lecter is fascinated by Starling, and they form an unusual relationship in which he provides her with a profile of the killer and his modus operandi in exchange for details about her unhappy childhood.

Lecter had previously met Gumb, the former lover of his patient (and eventual victim) Benjamin Raspail. He does not reveal this information directly, instead giving Starling vague clues to help her figure it out for herself. In return for Lecter's assistance, the FBI and Chilton arrange for him to be transferred to a federal institution with better living conditions.

Lecter escapes while in transit, however, killing and mutilating his guards and using one of their faces as a mask to fool police and paramedics before killing the latter and escaping. While in hiding, he writes one letter to Starling wishing her well, a second to Barney (his primary orderly at the asylum), thanking him for his courteous treatment, and a third to Chilton, promising gruesome revenge; Chilton disappears soon afterward.

==== Hannibal ====
In the third novel, 1999's Hannibal, Lecter lives in a palazzo in Florence, Italy, and works as a museum curator under the alias "Dr. Fell". One of Lecter's two surviving victims, Mason Verger—a wealthy, sadistic pedophile whom Lecter had brutalized during a court-ordered therapy session, leaving him a horrifically disfigured quadriplegic—seeks revenge, offering a huge reward for anyone who apprehends Lecter, whom he intends to feed to wild boars specially bred for the purpose.

Verger enlists the help of Rinaldo Pazzi, a disgraced Italian police inspector, and Paul Krendler, a corrupt Justice Department official and Starling's boss. Lecter kills Pazzi and returns to the United States to escape Verger's Sardinian henchmen, only to be captured. Starling follows them, intent on apprehending Lecter personally, and is injured in a gunfight with Verger's henchmen. Lecter escapes, thanks to Starling's help, and persuades Verger's younger sister Margot—his former patient, whom Verger had molested and raped years earlier—to kill her brother, promising to take the blame.

Lecter rescues the wounded Starling and takes her to his rented house on the Chesapeake shore to treat her, subjecting her to a regimen of psychoactive drugs in the course of therapy sessions to help her heal from her childhood trauma and her pent-up anger at the injustices of the world. He considers whether his long-dead younger sister Mischa may somehow be able to live again through Starling. One day, he invites her to a formal dinner where the guest and first course is Krendler, whose brain they consume together. On this night, Starling refuses to let her personality be subsumed, telling Lecter that Mischa's memory can live within him. She then offers him her breast, and they become lovers.

Three years later, former orderly Barney, who had treated Lecter with respect while he was incarcerated in Baltimore, sees Lecter and Starling entering the Teatro Colón opera house in Buenos Aires. Fearing for his life, Barney leaves Buenos Aires immediately, never to return. The reader then learns that Lecter and Starling are living together in an "exquisite" Beaux Arts mansion, where they employ servants and engage in activities such as learning new languages and dancing together and building their own respective memory palaces, and is told that "Sex is a splendid structure they add to every day", that the psychoactive drugs "have had no part in their lives for a long time", and that Lecter is "satisfied" with the fact that Mischa cannot return.

==== Hannibal Rising ====
Harris wrote a 2006 prequel, Hannibal Rising, after film producer Dino De Laurentiis (who owned the cinematic rights to the Lecter character) announced an intended film project depicting Lecter's childhood and development into a serial killer with or without Harris' help. Harris would also write the film's screenplay.

The novel chronicles Lecter's early life, from his birth into a family of the Lithuanian nobility in 1933, to being orphaned, along with his beloved younger sister Mischa, in 1944 when a Nazi Stuka bomber attacks a Soviet tank in front of their forest hideaway. Shortly thereafter, he and Mischa are captured by a band of Nazi collaborators, who murder and cannibalize Mischa before her brother's eyes; Lecter later learns that the collaborators also fed him Mischa's remains.

Irreparably traumatized, Lecter escapes from the deserters and wanders through the forest, dazed and unable to speak. He is found and taken back to his family's old castle, which had been converted into a Soviet orphanage, where he is bullied by the other children and abused by the dean.

He is adopted by his uncle Robert and Robert's Japanese wife, Lady Murasaki, who nurses him back to health and teaches him to speak again. Robert dies shortly after adopting Lecter, who forms a close, pseudo-romantic relationship with Murasaki. During this time he also shows great intellectual aptitude, entering medical school at a young age and distinguishing himself.

Despite his seemingly comfortable life, Lecter is consumed by a savage obsession with avenging Mischa's death. He kills for the first time as a teenager, using a katana sword to behead a racist fishmonger who insulted Murasaki. He then methodically tracks down, tortures, and murders each of the men who had killed his sister. In the process of taking his revenge, he forsakes his relationship with Murasaki and seemingly loses all traces of his humanity. The novel ends with Lecter being accepted to Johns Hopkins Hospital.

=== In film ===
Hopkins as Lecter in The Silence of the Lambs

Red Dragon was first adapted to film in 1986 as the Michael Mann film Manhunter, although the spelling of Lecter's name was changed to "Lecktor". He was played by actor Brian Cox. Cox based his performance on Scottish serial killer Peter Manuel.

In 1991, Orion Pictures produced a Jonathan Demme-directed adaptation of The Silence of the Lambs, in which Lecter was played by actor Anthony Hopkins. Hopkins' Academy Award-winning performance made Lecter into a cultural icon. In 2001, Hannibal was adapted to film, with Hopkins reprising his role. In the film adaptation, the ending is revised: Starling attempts to apprehend Lecter, who escapes after cutting off his own hand to free himself from her handcuffs. In 2002, Red Dragon was adapted again, this time under its original title, with Hopkins again as Lecter and Edward Norton as Will Graham. Hopkins wrote a screenplay for another sequel, ending with Starling killing Lecter. In 2016, Hopkins said, "I made the mistake of doing two more [Hannibal Lecter movies] and I should have only done one."

In late 2006, the novel Hannibal Rising was adapted into a film, which portrayed Lecter's development into a serial killer. In the film, which was finished by 2007, eight-year-old Lecter is portrayed by Aaran Thomas, while Gaspard Ulliel portrays him as a young man. Both the novel and film, as well as Ulliel's performance as Lecter, received generally negative reviews. In an interview Hopkins stated that he was approached about a narrative role in the film but declined the offer.

=== In television ===
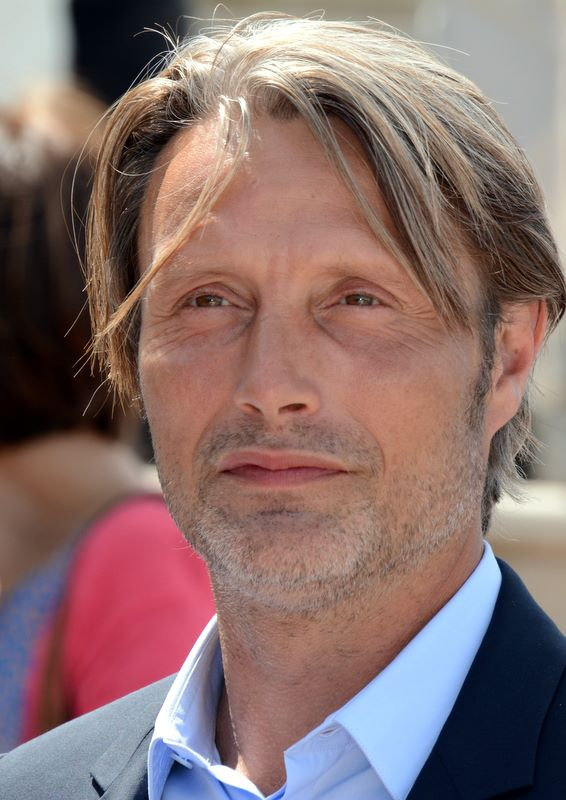
Mikkelsen at the 2013 Cannes Film Festival

In February 2012, NBC gave a series order to Hannibal, a television adaptation of Red Dragon to be written and executive-produced by Bryan Fuller. Mads Mikkelsen plays Lecter, opposite Hugh Dancy as Will Graham. In the TV series, which depicts Lecter prior to his capture, he consults with Graham to help him profile and catch serial killers. He is fascinated with Graham's ability to empathize with psychopaths, and subtly manipulates his fragile sanity in an attempt to turn him into a killer himself. The series also portrays a darkly romantic codependent relationship of Graham and Lecter through subtext and, later on text, and his ongoing battle of wits with Mason Verger (Michael Pitt, Joe Anderson).

Fuller commented on Mikkelsen's version of Lecter:

What I love about Mads' approach to the character is that, in our first meeting, he was adamant that he didn't want to do Hopkins or Cox. He talked about the character not so much as 'Hannibal Lecter the cannibal psychiatrist', but as Satan – this fallen angel who's enamoured with mankind and had an affinity for who we are as people, but was definitely not among us – he was other. I thought that was a really cool, interesting approach, because I love science fiction and horror and – not that we'd ever do anything deliberately to suggest this – but having it subtextually play as him being Lucifer felt like a really interesting kink to the series. It was slightly different than anything that's been done before and it also gives it a slightly more epic quality if you watch the show through the prism of, 'This is Satan at work, tempting someone with the apple of their psyche'. It appealed to all of those genre things that get me excited about any sort of entertainment.

CBS later developed the television series Clarice, based on the character Clarice Starling (from the novels and films) after her graduation from the FBI academy, as a sequel to The Silence of the Lambs set in 1993, starring Rebecca Breeds as Starling. The show does not acknowledge or feature Hannibal Lecter due to complicated rights issues of franchise characters between Metro-Goldwyn-Mayer and the Dino de Laurentiis Company; it premiered in 2021.

=== In other media ===
Donald Trump repeatedly mentioned Lecter and The Silence of the Lambs at rallies during his 2024 presidential campaign, referring to Lecter as "The late, great Hannibal Lecter", and then speaking of him as if he were a real person. Trump at times associated migrants coming into the United States with the fictional character, stating that they were being let out of "insane asylums" similar to that in which Lecter was detained, and thereafter fleeing to America. In April 2025, Trump claimed that Lecter helped him win the presidential election. Due to him referring to Hannibal Lecter as "late", some people have suggested that Trump might consider Hannibal Lecter a real (and now deceased) person. Others have stated that since Trump described Lecter as a character from a movie, these references must have been jokes.

== See also ==
- Bogeyman
- Cannibalism in popular culture
- List of horror film villains
