= Francis Dolarhyde =

Fictional serial killer

- Hannibal Lecter character
- Ralph Fiennes as Francis Dolarhyde in Red Dragon
- Created by: Thomas Harris
- Portrayed by: Tom Noonan (Manhunter); Ralph Fiennes (Red Dragon); Richard Armitage (Hannibal)
- Voiced by: Alex D. Linz (young; Red Dragon); Frank Langella (Red Dragon, deleted scenes)

In-universe information
- Aliases: The Great Red Dragon; Paul Crane
- Nicknames: The Tooth Fairy; Mr. D D.
- Gender: Male
- Occupation: Serial killer Technician at Gateway Film Laboratory, St. Louis (1961–1980); Army Veteran with Hardship Discharge (1955–1961)
- Family: Michael Trevane (father); Marian Trevane-Vogt (née Dolarhyde) (mother)
- Significant other: Reba McClane
- Relatives: Grandma Dolarhyde (grandmother); Howard Vogt (stepfather)
- Nationality: American

Francis Dolarhyde is a fictional character and the main antagonist of Thomas Harris' 1981 novel Red Dragon, as well as its film adaptations, Manhunter (1986), Red Dragon (2002) and the third season of Hannibal (2013–2015).

Dolarhyde is a serial killer who murders entire families every full moon. He is nicknamed "The Tooth Fairy" due to the nocturnal nature of his crimes, his tendency to bite his victims' bodies, the uncommon size and sharpness of his teeth and other apparent oral fixations. Dolarhyde kills at the behest of an alternate personality; he refers to his other self as "The Great Red Dragon" after William Blake's painting The Great Red Dragon and the Woman Clothed in Sun. He believes that killing people—or "changing" them, as he calls it—allows him to more fully "become" the Dragon.

== Character history ==
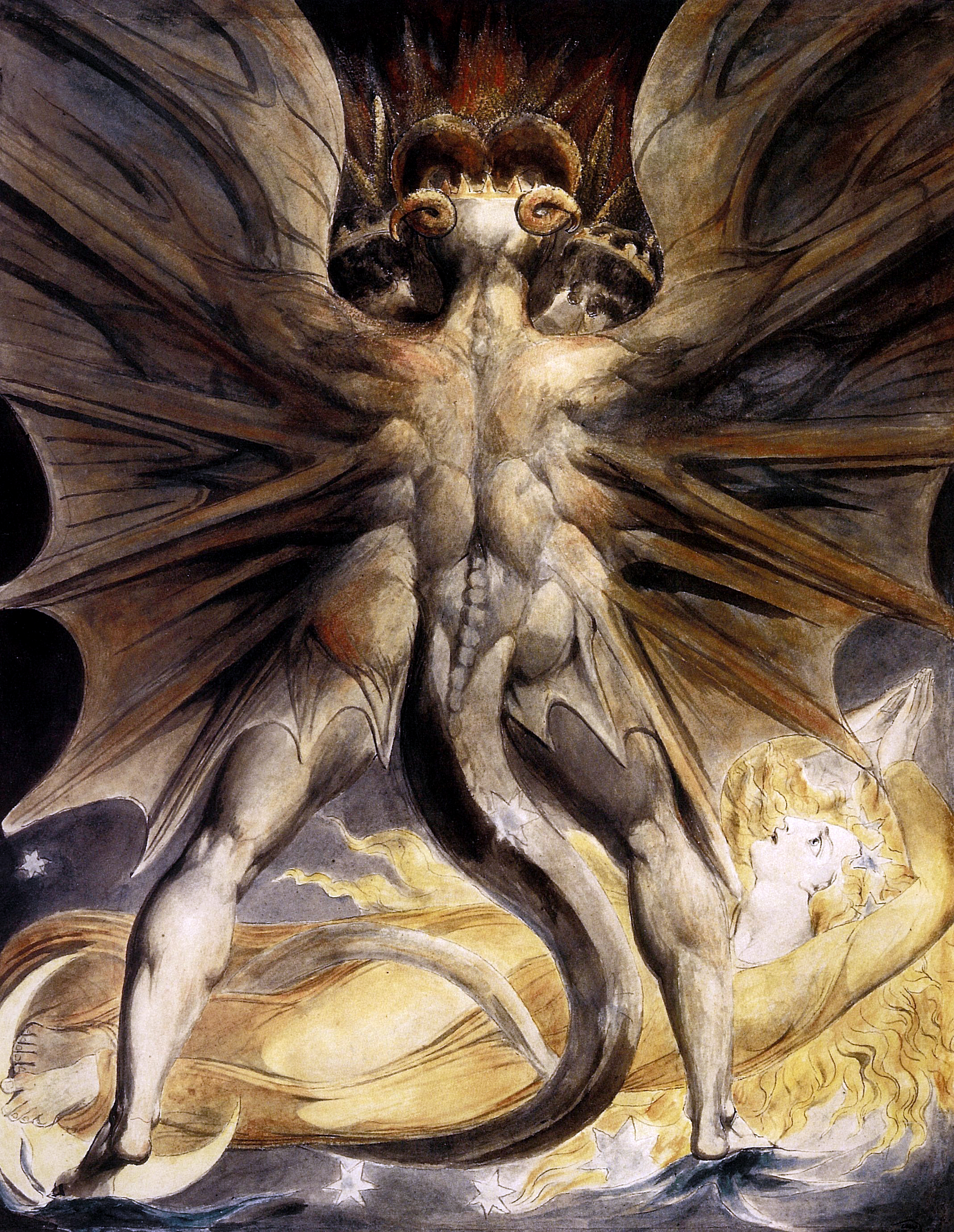
The Great Red Dragon and the Woman Clothed in Sun – the painting with which Dolarhyde is obsessed.

Francis Dolarhyde's backstory is supplied in the novel in detail and alluded to in the film adaptations. Born in Springfield, Missouri, on June 14, 1938, with a cleft lip and palate, Dolarhyde is abandoned by his mother and cared for in an orphanage until the age of five. He is then taken in by his grandmother, who subjects him to severe emotional and physical abuse, at one point threatening to castrate him after he wets his bed. Shortly afterwards, he begins torturing animals.

After his grandmother becomes afflicted with dementia, Dolarhyde is turned over to the care of his estranged mother and her husband in St. Louis; he is further abused by this family. After his stepsiblings smash his face into a bathroom mirror, Dolarhyde hangs his stepsister's cat and is sent back to the orphanage. After being caught breaking into a house at age 17, he enlists in the United States Army rather than serve prison time. While on his tour in Japan and neighboring countries, he learns how to develop film and receives cosmetic surgery for his cleft palate.

After his honorable discharge, Dolarhyde returns to St. Louis and gets a job with the Gateway Corporation as the production chief of their home movies division. He also takes up bodybuilding and becomes exceptionally strong; it is mentioned in the novel that even in middle age, Dolarhyde could have successfully competed in regional bodybuilding competitions, and at one point successfully cleans and presses 300 pounds (which approaches record-setting status for the late 1970s).

In his early forties, Dolarhyde sees the William Blake painting The Great Red Dragon and the Woman Clothed in Sun, which gives voice to his alternate personality. Under the influence of "The Red Dragon", Dolarhyde murders two families in two months, on or near a full moon. Dolarhyde chooses his victims through the home movies that he edits. In the days leading up to a full moon, Dolarhyde kills or injures the family pet and then spends nights in their backyard, watching the moon. On the night of the full moon, Dolarhyde breaks into the homes and shoots his victims or slits their throats in their beds before ritualistically posing them around the master bed and engaging in necrophilic acts with the mothers' corpses. He also implants shards of mirror glass into his victims' eyes so he can see his own "transformation" into the Dragon.

To facilitate the process of "becoming", Dolarhyde previously traveled to Hong Kong in order to have a rendering of the Blake dragon tattooed across his back and has two sets of false teeth made. One set is normal for his day-to-day life, while the other – based on a mold of his grandmother's deformed teeth – is ritualistically incorporated into the dragon persona he assumes during his killings. Due to the nocturnal nature of the murders and Dolarhyde's tendency to bite the corpses of his victims with the malformed dentures, the tabloid The National Tattler nicknames him "The Tooth Fairy", a monicker he hates.

FBI profiler Will Graham is asked to return from early retirement to aid in capturing the "Tooth Fairy". Graham had caught Dr. Hannibal Lecter, a psychiatrist and cannibalistic serial killer whom Dolarhyde idolizes, and to whom he sends a "fan letter" describing his murders. Graham visits Lecter in the Baltimore State Forensic Hospital for the Criminally Insane, hoping that the doctor would be able to help identify the killer or at least assist in creating a psychological profile. Following this meeting, Lecter "helps" by sending Dolarhyde Graham's address in code with the note, "Save yourself – kill them all." FBI Agent-in-Charge Jack Crawford intercepts the message in time to warn Graham's family and the local sheriff.

Dolarhyde becomes obsessed with coverage of his murders in The National Tattler and collects clippings about Lecter's arrest and trial, about Graham, and about his murders. In an attempt to provoke Dolarhyde out of hiding, Graham gives an interview to Freddy Lounds of The Tattler, in which he says that "The Tooth Fairy" is impotent, homosexual, and possibly the product of incest. He also implies that Lecter is offended that the killer considers himself Lecter's equal. The interview enrages Dolarhyde, who kidnaps Lounds, glues him to an antique wheelchair, intimidates him into recanting his article on tape, and then bites his lips off. Dolarhyde then sets Lounds on fire and rolls him down an incline into The Tattler's parking garage.

Dolarhyde falls in love with a blind co-worker named Reba McClane. The relationship initially quells his murderous impulses, but they soon come back, stronger than ever. Desperate to stop killing and keep Reba safe from the Dragon, Dolarhyde flies to New York, where he goes to see the original Blake watercolor at the Brooklyn Museum and devours it, believing that doing so would destroy his alter ego. This plan fails. His ingestion of the painting only makes the Dragon angrier. In a final effort to save Reba, Dolarhyde attempts to kill himself in a motel bathroom by hanging himself from the shower rod, but the noose breaks before he can suffocate.

The FBI and police investigations have so far found little result as the next full moon, and murders, are approaching. Trace evidence has led to dead ends, the killer's partial fingerprint has no match on file, and authorities can find no connection between the targeted families. Eventually Graham realizes that the killer must have had access to the families' home movies, using details from the film to plan entry to the family homes. Both families' film was processed at the same facility. From this fact, police eventually narrow down on Dolarhyde as the suspect.

Now completely in thrall to the Dragon and aware of the investigation closing in on him, Dolarhyde plans to kill Reba and himself by setting his house on fire with her in it. He relents at the last minute and frees her. Hearing a shotgun blast, McClane feels around Dolarhyde's burning living room and discovers what appears to be his dead body, which is incinerated in the subsequent blaze. However, Dolarhyde actually shot the corpse of a gas station attendant who had earlier offended him by leering at McClane, and whom he had kidnapped to stage his own disappearance. Police rescue McClane from the burning house. She is traumatized by her experience, but Graham reassures her that her influence helped restrain Dolarhyde's murderous impulses and probably saved lives.

Dolarhyde is initially believed to have killed himself, but forensic analysis of the crime scene eventually reveals that the corpse's fingerprints don't match his. Dolarhyde travels to Graham's home in Florida, attacks Graham, and stabs him in the face. Graham's wife Molly intercepts Dolarhyde and shoots him dead.

== Film adaptations ==
=== Manhunter (1986) ===
Tom Noonan as "Francis Dollarhyde" in Manhunter. The pictures of Noonan with the Red Dragon tattoo were not shown in the feature film, but were widely used in promotional material.

In the 1986 adaptation of Red Dragon, Manhunter, Dolarhyde (with his name changed to Dollarhyde) is portrayed by Tom Noonan. None of Dollarhyde's backstory appears in the film, aside from Will Graham's (William Petersen) assessment that Dollarhyde was abused as a child. Neither his Red Dragon personality nor his abusive grandmother are explored (though an earlier draft of the screenplay that more closely follows the book features this connection), although Dollarhyde sports a red dragon tattoo on his chest and his writings mention at one point "the strength of the Red Dragon".

He does not steal and consume the painting, and his killing of the co-worker is portrayed as solely from a surge of jealousy, rather than a cunning escape plan. Rather than faking his death after being tracked down, Dollarhyde attempts to kill Reba McClane (Joan Allen) because he believes she is cheating on him, only to be caught up by Graham, who rescues her. He engages in a standoff with the Missouri police and kills several officers, before being shot and killed by Graham.

=== Red Dragon (2002) ===
Francis Dolarhyde is portrayed by Ralph Fiennes in the 2002 film adaptation Red Dragon, which follows the novel more closely. In deleted scenes, Dolarhyde's Great Red Dragon personality is voiced by Frank Langella. In this adaptation, Dolarhyde dies when he attempts to kill Will Graham's (Edward Norton) family in Marathon, Florida. He and Graham severely wound each other during a gunfight, but Graham's wife Molly (Mary-Louise Parker) shoots Dolarhyde in the face, killing him.

== Television adaptation ==
Dolarhyde is portrayed by Richard Armitage in season 3 of the television series Hannibal, beginning in episode 8, "The Great Red Dragon". Dolarhyde was referenced in the series premiere as the unseen murderer of the Marlowe family. In this continuity, Dolarhyde and Lecter (Mads Mikkelsen) communicate directly by telephone, and Dolarhyde's inner discussions with the Dragon are instead depicted as therapy sessions with Lecter. In the series finale, "The Wrath of the Lamb", Lecter and Graham (Hugh Dancy) kill Dolarhyde together; Graham stabs him, while Lecter bites his throat out.

== Inspiration ==
Harris loosely based Francis Dolarhyde on the then-unidentified serial killer known as "BTK" (Bind, Torture, Kill), who at the time of the book's publication was terrorizing Kansas with a series of murders, beginning with the murder of a family in their home. Like Dolarhyde, BTK engaged in necrophiliac acts with his victims' bodies; he also wrote letters to the police alluding to being under the control of an outside influence, which he referred to as "Factor X".

Harris consulted with FBI Agent John E. Douglas prior to writing the book, and Douglas served as a consultant on the BTK case for Kansas police. Harris was so impressed with Douglas that he borrowed aspects of his life story and personality for the characters of Will Graham and Jack Crawford.
