= Red Dragon (2002 film) =

Thriller film directed by Brett Ratner

- Theatrical release poster
- Directed by: Brett Ratner
- Screenplay by: Ted Tally
- Based on: Red Dragon by Thomas Harris
- Produced by: Dino De Laurentiis; Martha De Laurentiis
- Starring: Anthony Hopkins; Edward Norton; Ralph Fiennes; Harvey Keitel; Emily Watson; Mary-Louise Parker; Philip Seymour Hoffman
- Cinematography: Dante Spinotti
- Edited by: Mark Helfrich
- Music by: Danny Elfman
- Production companies: Metro-Goldwyn-Mayer; Dino De Laurentiis Company
- Distributed by: Universal Pictures
- Release dates: September 30, 2002 (Ziegfeld Theatre); October 4, 2002 (United States); October 31, 2002 (Germany)
- Running time: 124 minutes
- Countries: Germany; United States
- Language: English
- Budget: $78 million
- Box office: $209.2 million

Red Dragon is a 2002 psychological horror thriller film based on the 1981 novel of the same name by Thomas Harris. It was directed by Brett Ratner and written by Ted Tally. The film serves as a prequel to the films The Silence of the Lambs (1991) and Hannibal (2001), as it is based on the first book in Harris's Hannibal Lecter series of novels. It is the last film of the series distributed by Universal Pictures and the last film to star Anthony Hopkins as Lecter, only followed by a prequel, Hannibal Rising (2007) which depicts Lecter's youth. The film sees FBI agent Will Graham (Edward Norton) enlisting the help of serial killer Hannibal Lecter (Anthony Hopkins) to catch another killer, Francis Dolarhyde (Ralph Fiennes). Harvey Keitel, Emily Watson, Mary-Louise Parker, and Philip Seymour Hoffman also star.

The novel Red Dragon was previously adapted into the film Manhunter (1986). Both films feature the same cinematographer, Dante Spinotti. After turning down the Silence of the Lambs sequel, Hannibal (2001), The Silence of the Lambs screenwriter Ted Tally returned to write Red Dragon. It was released by Universal Pictures on October 4, 2002, to mixed reviews from critics, who deemed it to be an improvement over Hannibal but inferior to The Silence of the Lambs. It was a box office success, earning $209.2 million worldwide against a $78 million budget.

== Plot ==
In 1980, FBI agent Will Graham visits forensic psychiatrist Hannibal Lecter to discuss a case. Graham has been working with Lecter on a psychological profile of a serial killer; Graham is certain the killer is a cannibal, based on the fact that organs taken from the victims are often used in cooking. He accidentally discovers a bookmarked sweetbreads recipe in Lecter's study that includes those organs, revealing Lecter as the killer. Lecter stabs him, but Graham stabs him back with arrowheads and shoots him before falling unconscious. Lecter is tried, found not guilty by reason of insanity, and is institutionalized at the Baltimore State Hospital for the Criminally Insane. Graham, traumatized, retires to Florida with his family.

Several years later, another serial killer nicknamed the "Tooth Fairy" has murdered two families in different cities – the Jacobis and the Leedses – during full moons. With another full moon approaching, FBI Special Agent Jack Crawford persuades Graham to review evidence and provide leads. Graham decides to consult Lecter for further insight after telling Crawford that the Tooth Fairy has "no face" to him, and he cannot determine how he was choosing the victim families.

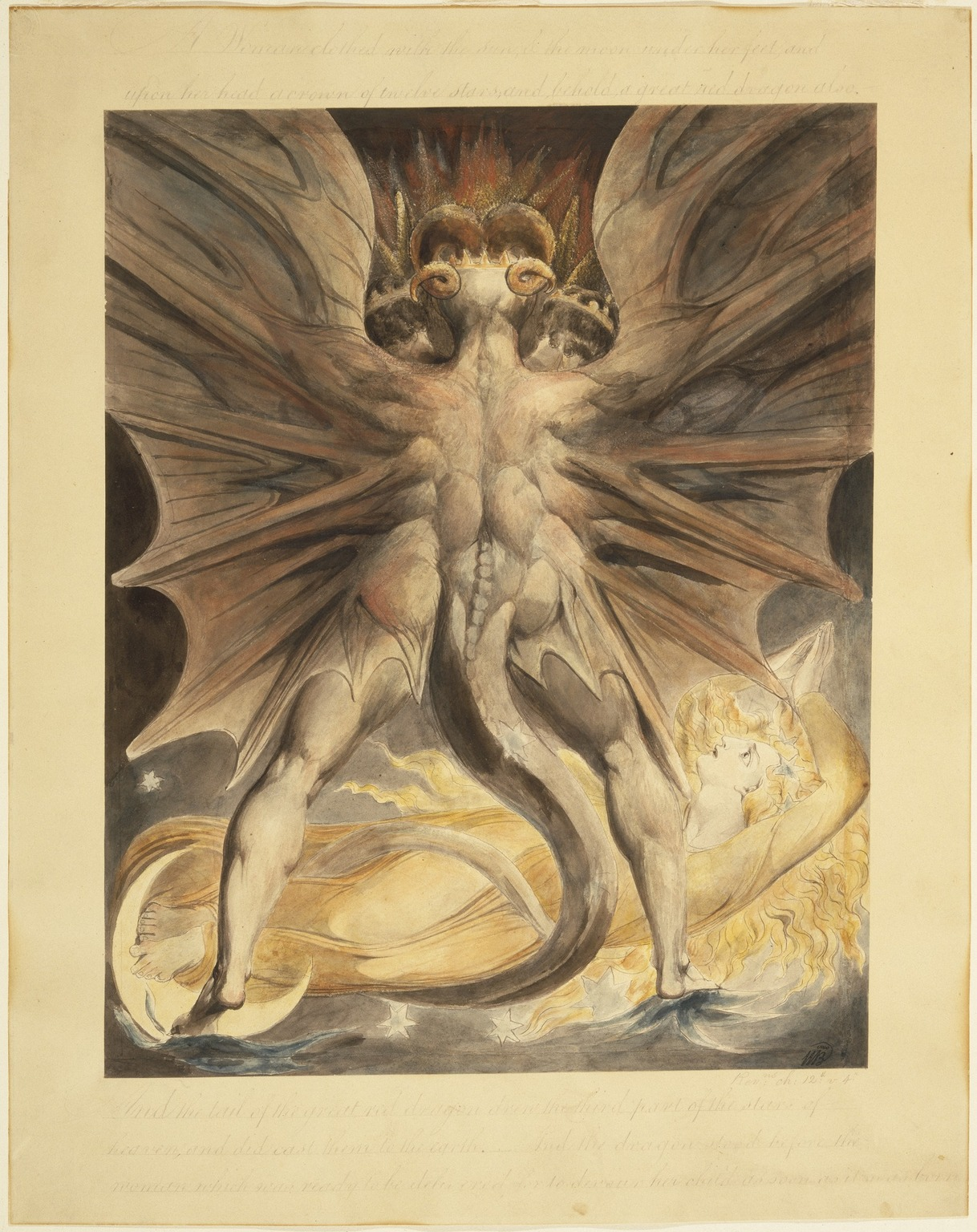
The Great Red Dragon and the Woman Clothed with the Sun, ca. 1803–1805 Brooklyn Museum

The Tooth Fairy is Francis Dolarhyde, who kills as directed by his alternate personality, which he calls the Great Red Dragon, after the William Blake painting The Great Red Dragon and the Woman Clothed with the Sun, which is tattooed on his back. He believes that each victim brings him closer to becoming the Dragon. His psychopathology originates from childhood abuse by his grandmother.

A letter from the Tooth Fairy, written on toilet paper, is discovered in Lecter's cell, expressing admiration for Lecter and suggesting that Lecter reply through the personals section of the National Tattler. Lloyd Bowman deciphers Lecter's reply, which is Will Graham's home address, sending his family into hiding. To lure out the Tooth Fairy, Graham gives an interview to Freddy Lounds, a National Tattler reporter, disparaging the killer as an impotent homosexual and that Lecter was only feigning interest in him. However, an enraged Dolarhyde kidnaps Lounds, glues him to a wheelchair, forces him to recant his allegations on tape, and sets him on fire, killing him.

At his job at Chromalux, a St. Louis based home video conversion business, Dolarhyde begins a relationship with blind co-worker Reba McClane. He struggles with affection for her and his alter ego's demands that he kill her. Desperate to stop the Dragon's control over him, Dolarhyde goes to the Brooklyn Museum, tears apart the Blake painting, and eats it.

Graham realizes that the Tooth Fairy knew the layout of his victims' houses from their home videos and concludes that the killer must be a Chromalux employee. He immediately goes there and is spotted by Dolarhyde. Panicked, Dolarhyde goes to Reba's house, suspecting that she may have betrayed him. He kills co-worker Ralph Mandy, takes a drugged Reba to his house, and sets it ablaze. Unable to kill her, he apparently shoots himself and Reba escapes. Graham is able to read Dolarhyde's journal and realizes he was made into a monster by systematic abuse.

After an autopsy, it is revealed that Dolarhyde used Ralph's body to stage his own death. Dolarhyde infiltrates the Graham home in Florida and takes Will's son Josh hostage. To save Josh, Graham provokes Dolarhyde with his grandmother's abusive words and he attacks him. Both are wounded in a shootout, which ends when Will's wife Molly finally kills Dolarhyde.

Graham, now on a sailboat with Molly and Josh, receives a letter from Lecter praising his work and bidding him well. The director of the state hospital, Dr. Frederick Chilton, tells Lecter that he has a visitor, a young woman from the FBI.

== Cast ==
- Anthony Hopkins as Hannibal Lecter
- Edward Norton as Will Graham
- Ralph Fiennes as Francis Dolarhyde
- Harvey Keitel as Jack Crawford
- Emily Watson as Reba McClane
- Mary-Louise Parker as Molly Graham
- Philip Seymour Hoffman as Freddy Lounds
- Anthony Heald as Frederick Chilton
- Bill Duke as Police Chief
- Ken Leung as Lloyd Bowman
- Stanley Anderson as Jimmy Price
- Frank Whaley as Ralph Mandy
- Frankie Faison as Barney Matthews
- Tyler Patrick Jones as Josh Graham
- Azura Skye as bookseller
- Ellen Burstyn as Grandmother Dolarhyde voice

== Production ==
The 1991 film The Silence of the Lambs, starring Anthony Hopkins as Lecter, was a critical and commercial success, winning five Academy Awards. Hopkins was the only major member of the Silence of the Lambs team to return for the 2001 sequel, Hannibal; it was also a commercial success, but received less positive reviews. Both films were adapted from novels by Thomas Harris.

Husband-and-wife producers Dino and Martha De Laurentiis decided to produce a film based on the 1981 novel Red Dragon, the first Hannibal Lecter novel, as a prequel to The Silence of the Lambs. Dino said that people thought he was "crazy" for adapting the book, as it had been previously adapted as Manhunter (1986), with Brian Cox as Lecter. Both Manhunter and Red Dragon had the same cinematographer, Dante Spinotti, and both featured Frankie Faison.

Hopkins hesitated to sign on, worried that three Lecter films might be too much. Screenwriter Ted Tally, who wrote The Silence of the Lambs but not Hannibal, had turned down many offers to write more serial killer stories. He said he liked the idea of Hopkins' Lecter films forming a trilogy: "If it ends here, it will end gracefully. I would hate to see this become Hannibal Lecter XIII." To satisfy expectations, Tally added Lecter scenes not in the novel, describing it as a "commercial reality". He had the support of Harris, who sent Tally dialogue and ideas for scenes. Edward Norton and Ralph Fiennes admired The Silence of the Lambs but had not enjoyed Hannibal. The cast were persuaded to join by Tally's screenplay; Fiennes felt it worked "only on suspense", without overt violence.

Norton and Brett Ratner disagreed on the scene in which Graham approaches the incarcerated Lecter for the first time. Ratner wanted Norton to incorporate a gesture or look to indicate Graham's fear, but Norton felt the audience would not need this if it were filmed correctly. They compromised by showing Graham's sweat stains when he removes his jacket in the next scene. Whereas Fiennes wanted to avoid overplaying his serial killer character, Hopkins aimed to play Lecter with more "danger and rage" than before. Fiennes spent 90 minutes of each day for months building his physique, and wore a prosthetic to give him a cleft palate. The tattoo on his back took around eight hours to apply.

== Soundtrack ==
Red Dragon: Original Motion Picture Soundtrack was composed by Danny Elfman, and produced by Mark Helfrich and Brett Ratner. Decca Records released it on September 24, 2002, in the United States and Canada.

== Reception ==
=== Box office ===
In the United States, Red Dragon premiered at the Ziegfeld Theatre in New York City on September 30, 2002, before opening in 3,357 theaters nationwide on October 4. The film grossed $13.4 million on its opening day and $36.5 million on its opening weekend, ranking #1 at the box office ahead of Sweet Home Alabama and setting a record at the time for the highest October opening weekend, surpassing Meet the Parents. It remained at number one during its second weekend, grossing $17.6 million, before dropping down to third place on its third weekend.

In the United Kingdom, Red Dragon was released on October 11 and collected $4.6 million during its opening weekend, ranking first at the box office ahead of Lilo & Stitch.

Red Dragon grossed $93,149,898 in the United States and Canada and $116,046,400 in other territories, for a total gross of $209,196,298 worldwide.

=== Critical response ===
On Rotten Tomatoes, Red Dragon has an approval rating of 69% based on 191 reviews, with an average rating of 6.40/10. The site's consensus said the film is "competently made, but everything is a bit too familiar". On Metacritic, the film has a weighted average score of 60 out of 100, based on 36 critics, indicating "mixed or average reviews". Audiences polled by CinemaScore gave the film an average grade of "A−" on an A+ to F scale.

Richard Corliss of Time gave the film a positive review, stating: "This darkly seductive, flawlessly acted piece is worlds removed from most horror films. Here monsters have their grandeur, heroes their gravity. And when they collide, a dance of death ensues between two souls doomed to understand each other." Todd McCarthy of Variety also gave the film a positive review, saying that the "audiences will be excused for any feelings of déjà vu the new film might inspire. That won't prevent them from watching it in rapt, anxious silence, however, as the gruesome crimes, twisted psychology and deterministic dread that lie at the heart of Harris' work are laid out with care and skill."

Roger Ebert of Chicago Sun-Times gave the film 3.5 out of four, praising Brett Ratner's directing and the film's atmosphere. He stated: "To my surprise, Ratner does a sure, stylish job, appreciating the droll humor of Lecter's predicament, creating a depraved new villain in the Tooth Fairy (Ralph Fiennes), and using the quiet, intense skills of Norton to create a character whose old fears feed into his new ones. There is also humor, of the uneasy he-can't-get-away-with-this variety, in the character of a nosy scandal-sheet reporter (Philip Seymour Hoffman)." David Sterritt of the Christian Science Monitor gave the film a positive review, stating that "the most refreshing aspect of Red Dragon is its reliance on old-fashioned acting instead of computer-aided gizmos. Hopkins overdoes his role at times—his vocal tones are almost campy—but his piercing eyes are as menacing as ever, and Ralph Fiennes is scarily good as his fellow lunatic."

David Grove of Film Threat, who gave the film four stars out of five, said: "Is Red Dragon a better film than Manhunter? I don't know. I think it stands on its own, but I wonder how much people who are intimately familiar with Manhunter will be shocked by it, although the ending is altogether different and much more realized, I think". Rick Kisonak, who also wrote for Film Threat, also gave the film a positive review, but he gave it three stars out of five, saying: "The only downside to this delectable third course? The regrettable likelihood that Lecter fans will have to make do without dessert."

Edward Guthmann of San Francisco Chronicle, gave the film a mixed review, saying that "in Hollywood, where integrity is rapidly consumed and careers defined by market value, there's trash and there's trash with a pedigree." Stephanie Zacharek, for Salon, also gave the film a mixed review, stating: "If you buy the overprocessed headcheese of the serial killer as refined genius, you'll love Red Dragon. Or maybe not. Even Hannibal Lecter devotees may lose patience with this picture's grandiose, self-serious ponderousness—that's Lecterese for, 'It's kind of boring in patches, actually.'" William Arnold of Seattle Post-Intelligencer, who gave the film a mixed review, said that the film "basically lives up to the old adage that the final work in a trilogy is invariably the weakest." Michael Atkinson of The Village Voice gave the film a negative review; he stated: "Red Dragon's formula is so risible and rote by now that the natural reaction to scenes of peril, torture, and suffering is flippant laughter."

== Home media ==
The film was released on VHS and DVD on April 1, 2003. It was released in two extras-packed DVD editions, a single-disc package and two-disc "Director's Edition". The single-disc package includes deleted scenes, director's commentary by Brett Ratner, Interview with FBI profiler John E. Douglas, Four featurettes: "The Hannibal Lecter Story," "The Making of Red Dragon," "The Art of Criminal Profiling" and "The Making of a Killer". The Director's Edition includes Ratner's video diary, featurette "The Red Dragon Tattoo", screen and film tests, and storyboard-to-final-feature comparisons.

On October 24, 2023, Kino Lorber released a 4K Blu-ray featuring a HDR/Dolby Vision Master from a 4K scan of the 35mm original camera negative. It includes all previously released special features on the Blu-ray.

== Awards ==
Red Dragon was nominated for 13 awards, and won several, including Empire Award for Best British Actress (Emily Watson) and Young Artist Award for Best Performance in a Feature Film – Young Actor Age Ten or Younger (Tyler Patrick Jones).

Date	Award	Category	Recipient	Result
May 18, 2003	Saturn Awards	Best Action/Adventure/Thriller Film		Nominated
May 18, 2003	Saturn Awards	Best Supporting Actor	Ralph Fiennes	Nominated
May 18, 2003	Saturn Awards	Best Supporting Actress	Emily Watson	Nominated
February 5, 2003	Empire Awards	Best British Actress	Emily Watson	Nominated
February 13, 2003	London Film Critics Circle Awards	British Supporting Actress of the Year	Emily Watson	Won
August 2, 2003	Teen Choice Awards	Choice Movie – Horror/Thriller		Nominated
March 29, 2003	Young Artist Awards	Best Performance in a Feature Film – Young Actor Age Ten or Younger	Tyler Patrick Jones	Won

== See also ==
- List of films featuring home invasions
