= Red Dragon (novel) =

1981 novel by Thomas Harris

- First US hardback edition cover
- Author: Thomas Harris
- Language: English
- Series: Hannibal Lecter
- Genre: Crime, horror, thriller, psychological horror
- Publisher: G. P. Putnams, Dell Publishing (USA)
- Publication date: October 1981
- Publication place: United States
- Media type: Print (Hardback & Paperback)
- Pages: 348 pp (first edition, hardback)
- ISBN: 0-399-12442-X (first edition, hardback)
- OCLC: 7572747
- Dewey Decimal: 813/.54 19
- LC Class: PS3558.A6558 R4 1981
- Followed by: The Silence of the Lambs

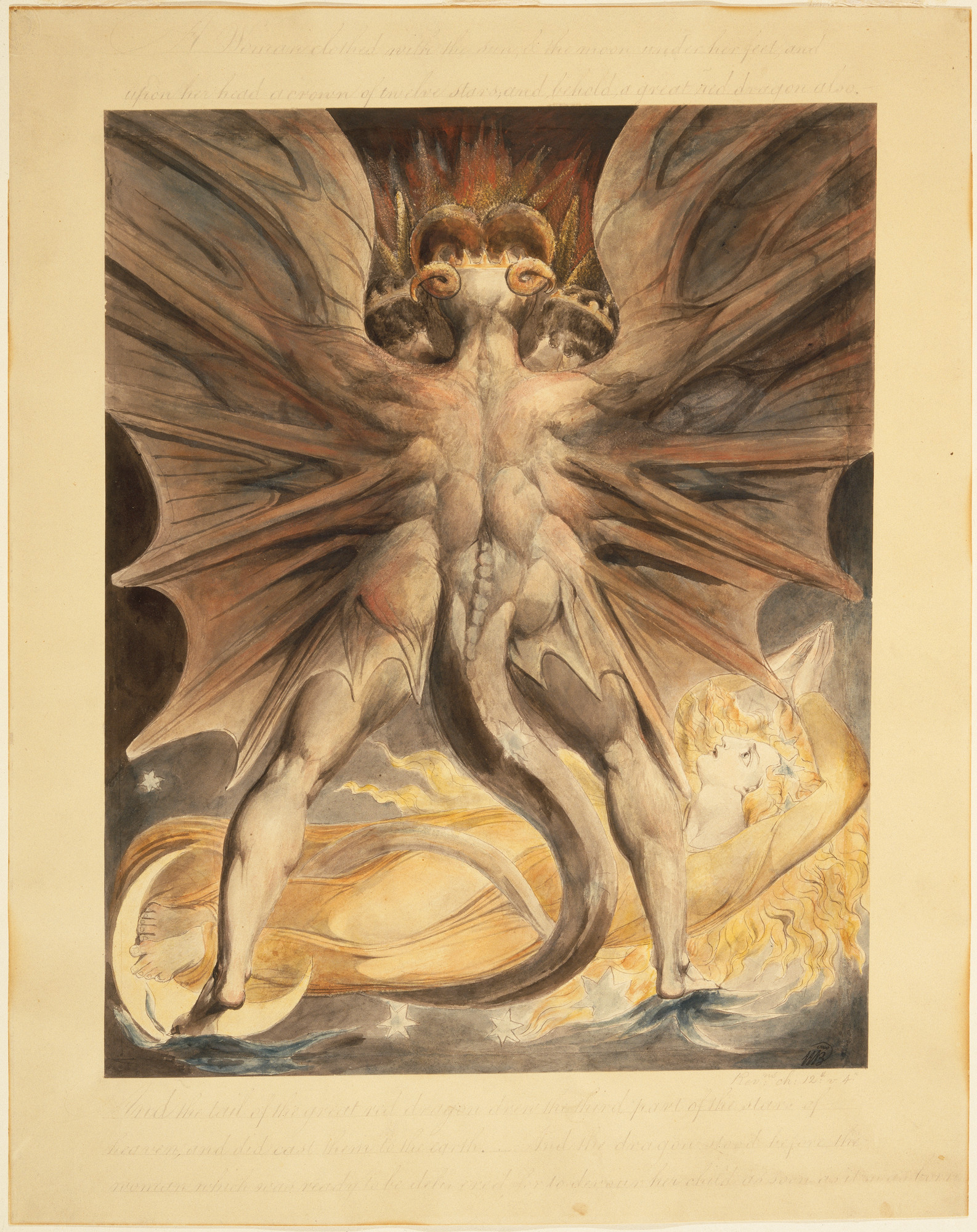
William Blake (British, 1757–1827) The Great Red Dragon and the Woman Clothed with the Sun (Rev. 12: 1–4), c. 1803–1805 – Brooklyn Museum

Red Dragon is a psychological horror novel by American author Thomas Harris, first published in 1981. The story follows former FBI profiler Will Graham, who comes out of retirement to find and apprehend an enigmatic serial killer, at first nicknamed "the Tooth Fairy", before being referred to as The Dragon. The novel introduces the character Dr. Hannibal Lecter, a brilliant psychiatrist and cannibalistic serial killer to whom Graham reluctantly turns for advice and with whom he has a dark past.

The title refers to the figure from William Blake's painting The Great Red Dragon and the Woman Clothed with the Sun. The novel was adapted as a film, Manhunter, in 1986, which featured Brian Cox as Hannibal "Lecktor". Directed by Michael Mann, the film received mixed reviews and fared poorly at the box office.

Harris’s sequel to the novel, The Silence of the Lambs (1988), was turned into a highly successful film of the same name in 1991, after which Red Dragon found a new readership. The film featured Anthony Hopkins in the role of Hannibal Lecter, for which he won an Oscar for Best Actor in 1991. Due to the success of the film and its sequel, Red Dragon was remade as a film directed by Brett Ratner in 2002, this time bearing the title of the original novel and with Hopkins playing Lecter. Elements of the novel also influenced the NBC television series Hannibal, while the plot was adapted as the second half of the series' third season.

== Plot ==
In 1975, Will Graham, a brilliant profiler of the FBI, captured the serial killer Hannibal Lecter, a world-renowned psychiatrist who killed and ate his victims. However, Graham suffered serious physical and mental injuries from the encounter and retired afterward.

In 1980, a serial killer nicknamed "The Tooth Fairy" stalks and murders seemingly random families during sequential full moons. He first kills the Jacobi family in Birmingham, Alabama, then the Leeds family in Atlanta, Georgia, in both cases breaking into the family home at night, shooting the parents and children, and then having intercourse with the mother's body after she dies, leaving a distinctive bite pattern on her body. Two days after the Leeds murders, Agent Jack Crawford, Graham's mentor, goes to Graham's residence in Marathon, Florida, and requests his assistance; Graham reluctantly agrees.

After looking over the crime scenes, Graham realizes that the killer posed the family's bodies as an audience during the rape, and accurately predicts the FBI will find the killer's fingerprints on the victims' eyes. He also discovers a stakeout location where the killer watched the home from a nearby wood and discovers a Chinese character carved into a tree: a mahjong symbol known as the red dragon. Having reached a dead end, Graham realizes he must visit Lecter and seek his help to capture "The Tooth Fairy." Lecter, locked in a maximum security cell in the Baltimore State Hospital for the Criminally Insane, offers enigmatic clues to the killer's pathology and cruelly taunts Graham that the reason he caught Lecter is because they are alike, disturbing Graham and causing him to cut the meeting short.

"The Tooth Fairy" is revealed (to the readers) to be the production chief of a St. Louis film processing firm named Francis Dolarhyde. He is obsessed with the William Blake painting The Great Red Dragon and the Woman Clothed with the Sun. Born with a severe cleft palate, Dolarhyde believes himself weak and deformed despite having had corrective surgery. He is unable to control his violent sexual urges, and believes that murdering people, or "changing" them, as he calls it, allows him to more fully "become" an alternative personality he calls the "Great Red Dragon", after the dominant character in Blake's painting. Flashbacks reveal that his sociopathy is born from the systematic abuse he suffered as a child at the hands of his sadistic grandmother, who raised him after his mother abandoned him as an infant.

As Graham investigates the case, he is hounded by Freddy Lounds, a sleazy tabloid reporter, who publishes an article about Graham consulting Lecter. Dolarhyde, reading the article, writes a fan letter to Lecter, asking for a response. Frederick Chilton, the head of the institute and Lecter's self-styled nemesis, discovers the letter hidden in Lecter's cell, with Dolarhyde's instructions for contacting him removed. After significant forensic analysis, the FBI deduce that Lecter has placed a coded personal ad in Lounds' tabloid, the National Tattler, but are unable to break the code before the publishing deadline, and Graham reluctantly allows the ad to run. Lounds becomes aware of the correspondence and tries to trick Graham into revealing details of the investigation by posing as the killer, but is found out and arrested. When the code is finally broken, it reveals that Lecter has given Graham's address to the killer and tells him to save himself by killing the family. Graham's wife, Molly, and his stepson are evacuated, causing significant tension in his marriage.

Hoping to lure the Red Dragon into a trap, Graham gives Lounds an interview in which he deliberately mischaracterizes the killer as an impotent homosexual, which includes clues to Graham's location. This infuriates Dolarhyde, but instead of pursuing Graham, he kidnaps Lounds. Gluing Lounds to a wheelchair, Dolarhyde forces him to recant the allegations on tape, bites off his lips and sets him on fire. Lounds dies from his injuries soon afterward, and the tape of his assault is sent to his newspaper and the FBI. Graham receives a letter from Lecter, congratulating him on his indirect murder of Lounds.

At about the same time, Dolarhyde falls in love with a blind co-worker named Reba McClane, which conflicts with his homicidal urges. In beginning a relationship with McClane, Dolarhyde resists the Dragon's "possession" of him as it urges him to kill McClane; he goes to the Brooklyn Museum, beats a museum secretary unconscious, and eats the original Blake watercolor of The Red Dragon.

As the full moon nears, Graham realizes that the killer knew the layout of his victims' houses from their home movies, which were developed at the same film processing lab. Dolarhyde's job gives him access to all home movies that pass through the company. When he sees Graham interviewing his boss, Dolarhyde realizes they are onto him and goes to see McClane one last time. He finds her breaking up with her previous boyfriend, Ralph Mandy, to be with Dolarhyde; McClane grants Mandy's request for a final kiss goodbye. Enraged with jealousy, Dolarhyde kills Ralph Mandy. He kidnaps McClane, takes her to his house and sets the place on fire. He says he intends to kill her and then himself, but finds himself unable to shoot her. The shotgun fires, and McClane hears a body hit the floor. McClane escapes just before the house explodes.

Believing Dolarhyde is dead, Graham and his family move back to the Florida home. However, Dolarhyde shows up at the house and, after a violent struggle, stabs Graham in the face before being fatally shot by Molly. Graham survives the attack, but he is left with permanent facial scars, and it is implied that Molly will leave him. As he recovers, Crawford explains how Dolarhyde faked his death. The dead man in Dolarhyde's house was a gas station attendant he'd had an altercation with; Dolarhyde had brought the man's body to his house to stage his death, using McClane as a witness. Crawford intercepts a letter to Graham from Lecter, which bids him well and hopes that he isn't too disfigured, and destroys it in an incinerator.

During his recovery, Graham has a flashback to a visit he made to Shiloh, the site of a major battle in the American Civil War, shortly after apprehending (and in the process, killing) Garrett Hobbs, a serial killer he investigated before Hannibal Lecter. Graham has an epiphany about the indifference of nature and decides that it is not nature that is haunted by events, as he had thought when visiting Shiloh before, but men who are haunted.

== Characters ==
- Will Graham
- Francis Dolarhyde
- Jack Crawford
- Hannibal Lecter
- Freddy Lounds
- Reba McClane
- Ralph Mandy
- Molly Graham
- Willy Graham

== Origin ==
Red Dragon is Thomas Harris's second novel, after Black Sunday. As part of his research for the book he attended classes and talked to agents at the FBI Behavioral Science Unit in Quantico, Virginia, during the late 1970s. He learned about serial killers, offender profiling and the role of the FBI in serial killer investigations. After his father became terminally ill, Harris stayed for 18 months at an isolated shotgun-style house where he worked on the book. The rural setting helped him visualize both the character of Hannibal Lecter and the Leeds murder house depicted in the story. The book is dedicated to his father.

== Reception ==
Thomas Fleming in The New York Times gave the book a generally favorable review. He compared the development of the story to the gradual acceleration of a powerful car, but complained that the explanation for Dolarhyde's behavior, trauma in his youth, was too mechanistic. James Ellroy has described Red Dragon as 'the best pure thriller I've ever read' and cited it as an influence on his own novel Killer on the Road. In a 1981 article for the Washington Post, horror author Stephen King praised it as "probably the best popular novel to be published in America since The Godfather."

Dave Pringle reviewed Red Dragon for Imagine magazine, calling it "an excellent thriller about a man who murders whole families with the aid of his grandmother's false teeth (I kid not)."

== Adaptations ==
- The first film, released in 1986 under the title Manhunter, was written and directed by Michael Mann and focused on FBI Special Agent Will Graham, played by William Petersen. Lecter (renamed Lecktor) was played by Brian Cox.
- In 1996, Chicago's Defiant Theatre produced a full stage version of the novel at the Firehouse theatre, adapted and directed by the company's artistic director, Christopher Johnson. The production included projected home movies as were described in the novel, including reenacting the violent murders. Dolarhyde's inner dragon was personified by an actor in an elaborate, grotesque costume and seduces the killer to continue on his violent path.
- The second film, which used the title Red Dragon, appeared in 2002. Directed by Brett Ratner and written by Ted Tally (who also wrote the screenplay for The Silence of the Lambs), it starred Edward Norton as Graham and Anthony Hopkins as Lecter.
- Elements from the novel influenced the NBC TV adaptation Hannibal, which first aired in 2013. Graham is played by Hugh Dancy, and Lecter is played by Mads Mikkelsen. Though set in the 2010s, the series begins prior to the events of Red Dragon, reimagining Graham's and Lecter's early encounters during the former's tenure with the FBI and the events following his fatal shooting of Garret Jacob Hobbs. The plot of the novel itself was adapted for the second half of the series' third season, with Richard Armitage cast as Francis Dolarhyde and Rutina Wesley as Reba McClane.
