= Linoleum knife =

Cutting tool

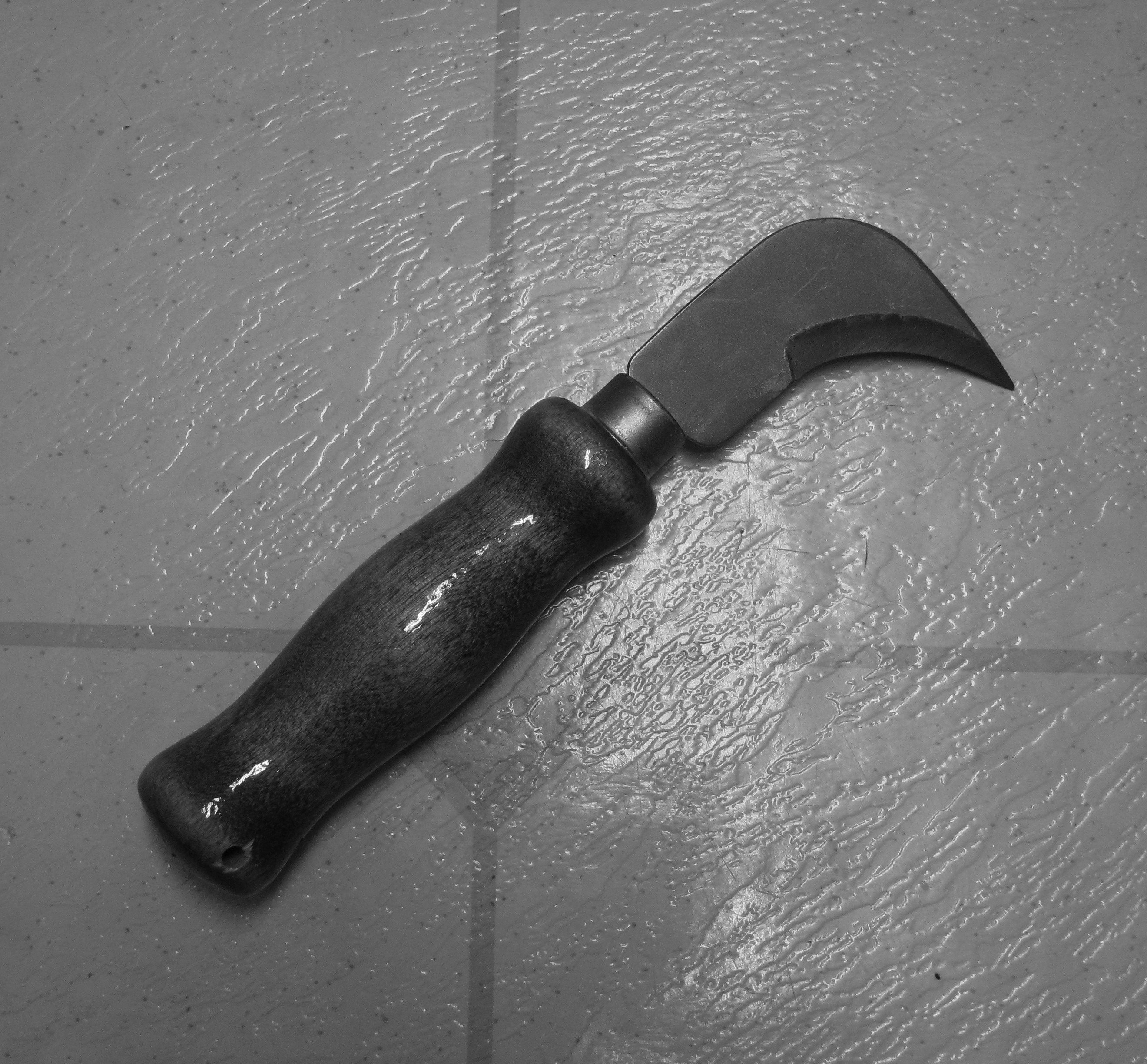
A modern linoleum knife with a wooden handle.

A linoleum knife (also called a banana knife or hook axe) is a small knife that has a short, stiff blade with a curved point and a handle and is used to cut linoleum or other sheet materials such as wood panelling, wood veneer, and mica sheets.

The knife is similar in design to the sickle and billhook. Like most cutting tools with hooked blades, the purpose of this design is to cut by pulling. This helps to reduce the wasted effort of simultaneously pressing the blade into the item as one would with a straight blade. It also allows the user to reach out and cut an item with the arm fully extended, such as during plant trimming or harvesting, or making a long continuous cut into a surface.

This tool can also be used to jimmy doors open by bypassing the safety latch in the doorjamb. Knives of a similar shape and design are commonly used by carpet fitters.
