= The Great Red Dragon paintings =

Series of paintings by William Blake

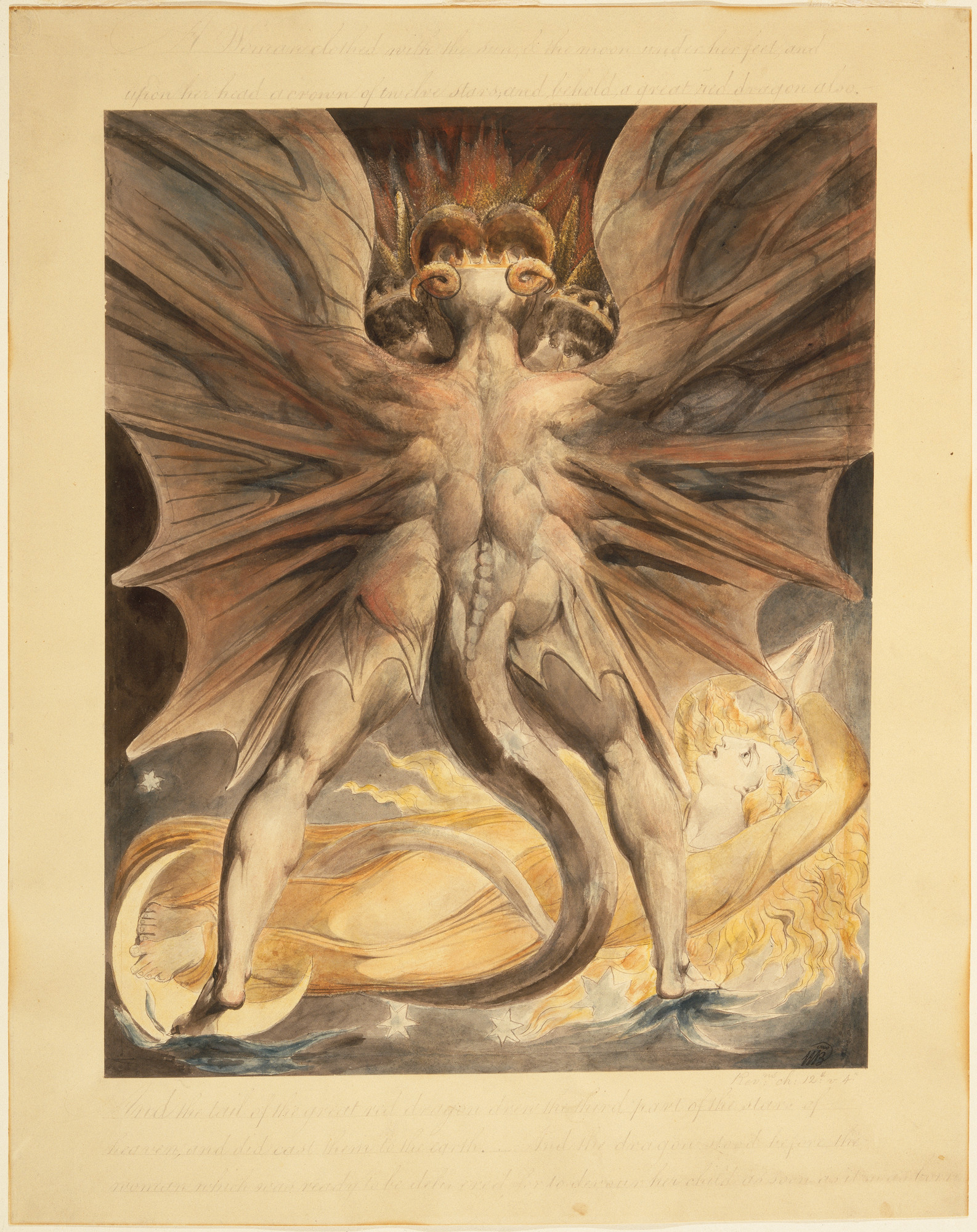
William Blake (British, 1757–1827) The Great Red Dragon and the Woman Clothed with the Sun (Rev. 12: 1–4), c. 1803–1805 – Brooklyn Museum

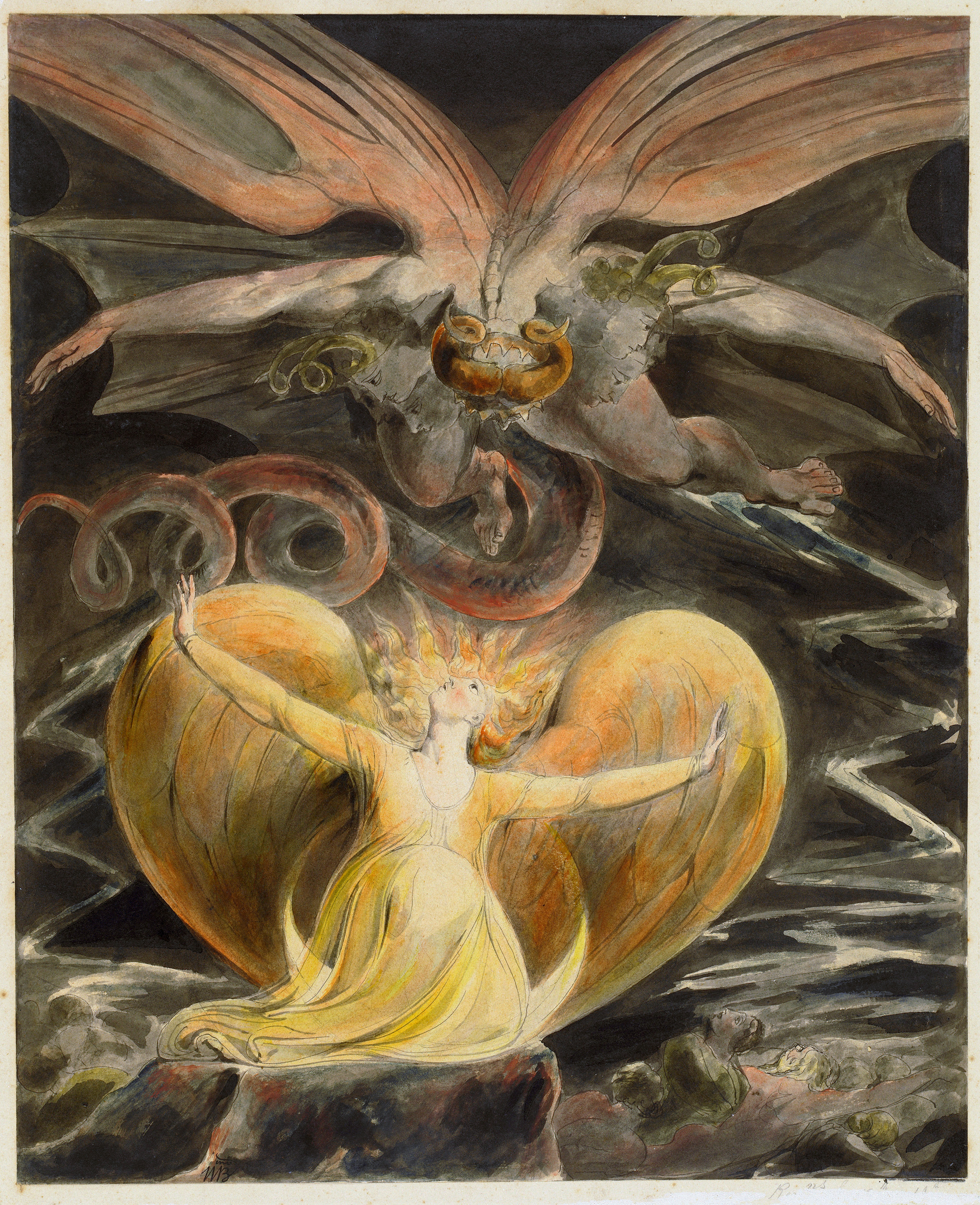
The Great Red Dragon and the Woman Clothed In Sun (National Gallery)

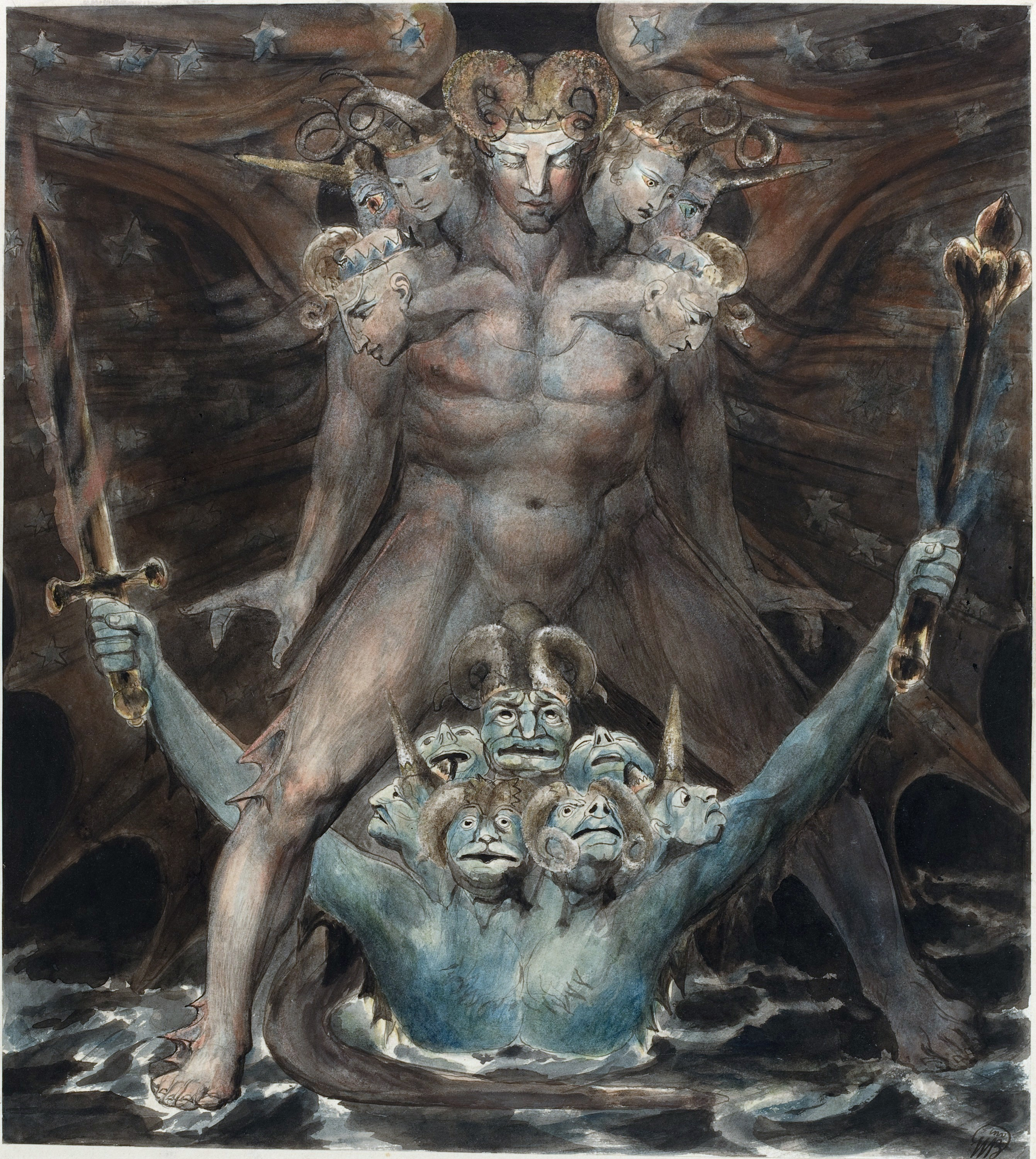
The Great Red Dragon and the Beast from the Sea

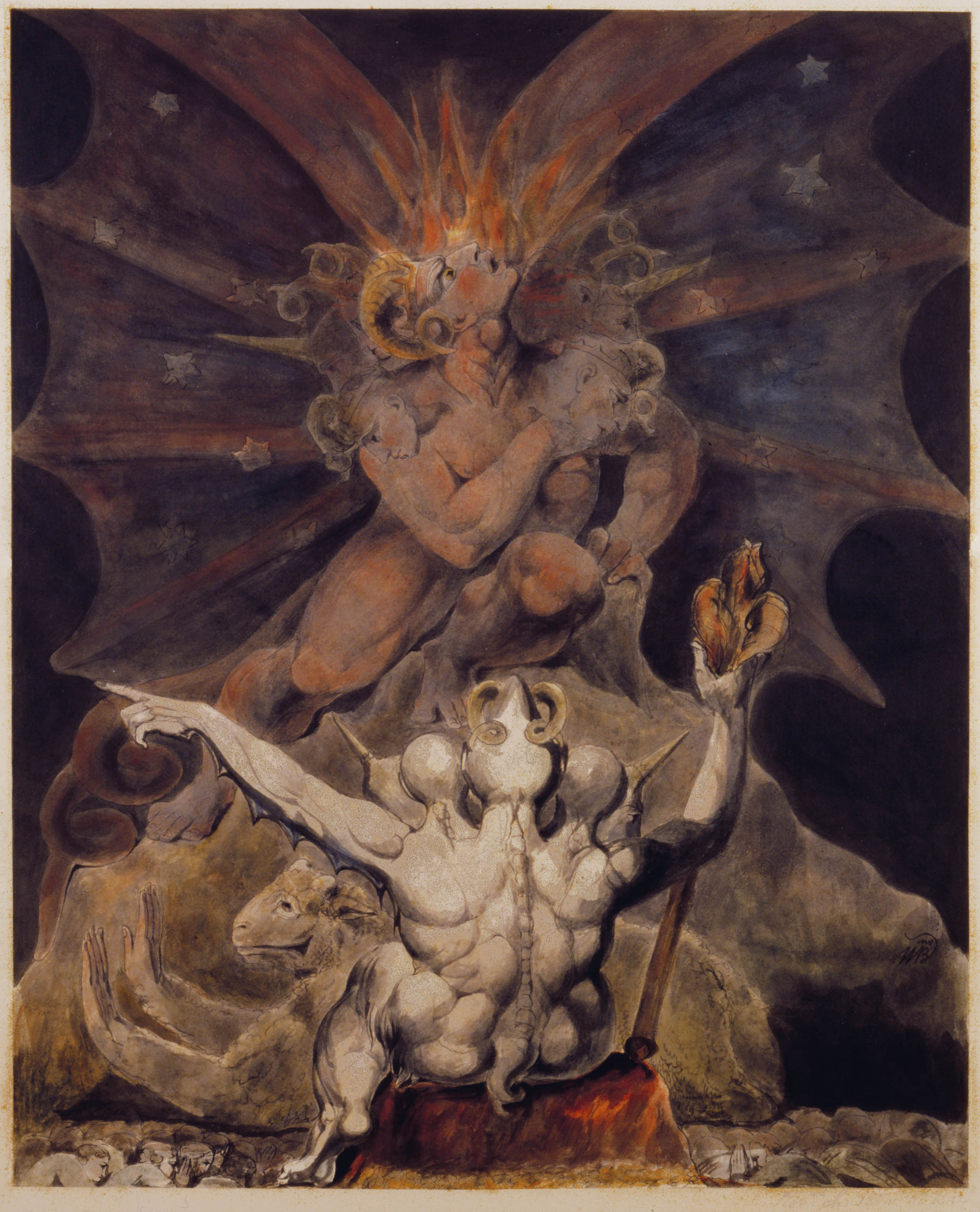
The Number of the Beast is 666

The Great Red Dragon paintings are a series of watercolour paintings by the English poet and painter William Blake, created between 1805 and 1810. It was during this period that Blake was commissioned to create over one hundred paintings intended to illustrate books of the Bible. These paintings depict "The Great Red Dragon" in various scenes from the Book of Revelation.

And behold a great red dragon, having seven heads and ten horns, and seven crowns upon his heads. And his tail drew the third part of the stars of heaven, and did cast them to the earth.

— (Rev. 12:3–4, KJV)

== The paintings ==
=== The Great Red Dragon and the Woman Clothed with the Sun (Rev. 12: 1-4) ===
Height: 43.7 cm, Width: 34.8 cm

The original work is housed at the Brooklyn Museum and kept behind closed doors due to its sensitivity to light. The painting was famously referenced in the novel Red Dragon by Thomas Harris, as well as in its subsequent film adaptations.

=== The Great Red Dragon and the Woman Clothed In Sun ===
Height: 40.8 cm, Width: 33.7 cm

This image, housed at the National Gallery of Art, Washington, D.C., is similar to the Brooklyn Museum image (see above), but the subject is shown from a different viewpoint and the figures are in different positions.

=== The Great Red Dragon and the Beast from the Sea ===
Height: 40.1 cm, Width: 35.6 cm

Housed at the National Gallery of Art, Washington, D.C.

=== The Number of the Beast is 666 ===
Height: 40.6 cm, Width: 33.0 cm

Housed at the Rosenbach Museum and Library

== In media ==
It has been used as the Oxford World's Classics front cover of The Private Memoirs and Confessions of a Justified Sinner.

Several of the paintings featured prominently in the 2019 psychological horror film Saint Maud by British director Rose Glass.

The 1981 novel Red Dragon by Thomas Harris heavily features the Blake painting. The primary antagonist is driven by a psychological obsession with the painting, including having the painting tattooed onto his back and the belief that his murders will help him to transform into the Red Dragon. Near the end of the novel, he attempts to break away from his delusions by going to the Brooklyn Museum and eating the original painting itself. The 2002 film version of the novel includes these elements, and features multiple shots of the painting, as did the NBC prequel series Hannibal.
