= Hannibal Lecter (franchise) =

Media franchise based on eponymous serial killer

- The Hannibal Lecter series of novels
- Created by: Thomas Harris
- Original work: Red Dragon
- Owners: Dino de Laurentiis Company; Amazon MGM Studios
- Years: 1981–present

Print publications
- Novels: Red Dragon (1981); The Silence of the Lambs (1988); Hannibal (1999); Hannibal Rising (2006)

Films and television
- Films: Manhunter (1986); The Silence of the Lambs (1991); Hannibal (2001); Red Dragon (2002); Hannibal Rising (2007)
- Television series: Hannibal (2013–2015); Clarice (2021)

Theatrical presentations
- Play: The Silence of the Lambs (2026)

Audio
- Soundtracks: The Silence of the Lambs (1991); Hannibal (2001)

The Hannibal Lecter franchise is an American media franchise based around the eponymous character, Hannibal Lecter, a brilliant, cannibalistic serial killer whose assistance is routinely sought out by law enforcement personnel to aid in the capture of other criminals. He originally appeared in a series of novels (starting with Red Dragon in 1981) by Thomas Harris. The series has since expanded into film and television, having four timeline-connected franchise films: The Silence of the Lambs (1991), Hannibal (2001), Red Dragon (2002) and Hannibal Rising (2007), with three starring Anthony Hopkins.

== Films ==
Hannibal Lecter story chronology
Original continuity
- Hannibal Rising
- Red Dragon
- The Silence of the Lambs
- Clarice (TV series)
- Hannibal (2001 film)
Manhunter continuity
- Manhunter
Hannibal continuity
- Hannibal (2013 TV series)

=== Manhunter (1986) ===
The first adaptation was the 1986 film Manhunter, which was an adaptation of Red Dragon, directed by Michael Mann. Brian Cox stars as Hannibal Lecter (in the film, the surname is changed to Lecktor).

=== The Silence of the Lambs (1991) ===
The next adaptation was 1991's The Silence of the Lambs, which was directed by Jonathan Demme and was the first film to feature Anthony Hopkins in the role of Hannibal Lecter. Silence was a success, both critically and financially, and went on to become the third film in Academy Awards history to win in all top five categories (Best Actor for Hopkins, Best Actress for Jodie Foster, Best Director for Demme, Best Adapted Screenplay for Ted Tally, and Best Picture).

=== Hannibal (2001) ===
Hopkins reprised the role in 2001's Hannibal, a sequel directed by Ridley Scott.

=== Red Dragon (2002) ===
Hopkins once again reprised the role in Red Dragon, a prequel directed by Brett Ratner. In 2002, Hopkins revealed that he had written a screenplay for another sequel, ending with Clarice Starling killing Lecter, but it was not produced.

=== Hannibal Rising (2007) ===
Hannibal Rising was released in 2007. The film is a prequel, directed by Peter Webber and starring Gaspard Ulliel as Lecter.

Film	U.S. release date	Director(s)	Screenwriter(s)	Producer(s)
Manhunter	August 15, 1986	Michael Mann	Michael Mann	Richard A. Roth
The Silence of the Lambs	February 14, 1991	Jonathan Demme	Ted Tally	Ron Bozman, Kenneth Utt & Edward Saxon
Hannibal	February 9, 2001	Ridley Scott	David Mamet & Steven Zaillian	Ridley Scott, Dino De Laurentiis & Martha De Laurentiis
Red Dragon	October 4, 2002	Brett Ratner	Ted Tally	Dino De Laurentiis & Martha De Laurentiis
Hannibal Rising	February 9, 2007	Peter Webber	Thomas Harris	Tarak Ben Ammar, Dino De Laurentiis & Martha De Laurentiis

== Television ==
Series	Seasons	Episodes	First released	Last released	Showrunner(s)	Network(s)
Hannibal	3	39	April 4, 2013	August 29, 2015	Bryan Fuller	NBC
Clarice	1	13	February 11, 2021	June 24, 2021	Jenny Lumet & Alex Kurtzman	CBS

=== Hannibal (2013–2015) ===
In 2013, the TV series Hannibal premiered. Developed by Bryan Fuller, it is not a direct adaptation, but based on characters and elements from the novels. Some male characters have become female, such as Freddy Lounds, who is renamed Fredricka "Freddie" Lounds. The series has garnered much critical acclaim since its premiere, winning the 2014 and 2015 Saturn Awards for Best Network Television Series, as well as the inaugural Best Action-Thriller Television Series award in 2016.

=== Clarice (2021) ===
In 2012, Lifetime intended to develop a television series centered on Starling after her graduation from the FBI academy, which was to be produced by MGM; the project was never picked up and was shelved. CBS later developed the series of the same name, with Alex Kurtzman and Jenny Lumet as producers, as a sequel to The Silence of the Lambs set in 1993, starring Rebecca Breeds as Starling. The show premiered in 2021.

== Cast and characters ==
Character	Films					Television series		Stage
Character	Manhunter	The Silence of the Lambs	Hannibal	Red Dragon	Hannibal Rising	Hannibal	Clarice	The Silence of the Lambs
Character	1986	1991	2001	2002	2007	2013–2015	2021	2026
Hannibal Lecter	Brian Cox (as Hannibal Lecktor)	Anthony Hopkins	Anthony Hopkins	Anthony Hopkins	Gaspard Ulliel Aaran Thomas^{Y}	Mads Mikkelsen		John Partridge
Clarice Starling		Jodie Foster Masha Skorobogatov^{Y}	Julianne Moore				Rebecca Breeds Maya McNair^{Y}	Mollie Gallagher
Will Graham	William Petersen			Edward Norton		Hugh Dancy		
Jack Crawford	Dennis Farina	Scott Glenn		Harvey Keitel		Laurence Fishburne		Oliver Farnworth
Frederick Chilton	Benjamin Hendrickson	Anthony Heald		Anthony Heald		Raúl Esparza		Minal Patel
Francis Dolarhyde (The Tooth Fairy)	Tom Noonan (as Francis Dollarhyde)			Ralph Fiennes Alex D. Linz^{Y}^{V}		Richard Armitage		
Buffalo Bill (Jame Gumb)		Ted Levine					Simon Northwood	Sam Jackson
Barney Matthews		Frankie Faison	Frankie Faison	Frankie Faison		Jonathan Tucker (as Matthew Brown)		
Freddy Lounds	Stephen Lang			Philip Seymour Hoffman		Lara Jean Chorostecki (as Fredricka "Freddie" Lounds)		
Mason Verger			Gary Oldman			Michael Pitt; Joe Anderson		
Paul Krendler		Ron Vawter	Ray Liotta			Cynthia Nixon (as Kade Prurnell)	Michael Cudlitz	
Reba McClane	Joan Allen			Emily Watson		Rutina Wesley		
Molly Graham	Kim Greist			Mary-Louise Parker		Nina Arianda		
Rinaldo Pazzi			Giancarlo Giannini			Fortunato Cerlino		
Cordell Doemling			Željko Ivanek			Glenn Fleshler		
Margot Verger						Katharine Isabelle		
Vladis Grutas					Rhys Ifans			
Lady Murasaki					Gong Li			
Alan Bloom	Paul Perri (as Sidney Bloom)					Caroline Dhavernas (as Alana Bloom)		
Beverly Katz	Michele Shay			Elizabeth Dennehy (as Beverly)		Hettienne Park		
Jimmy Price	Dan Butler			Stanley Anderson		Scott Thompson		
Brian Zeller	Chris Elliott (as Zeller)					Aaron Abrams		
Lloyd Bowman	Bill Smitrovich			Ken Leung				
Chiyoh						Tao Okamoto		
Bedelia Du Maurier						Gillian Anderson		
Abel Gideon						Eddie Izzard		
Ardelia Mapp		Kasi Lemmons					Devyn A. Tyler	
Catherine Martin		Brooke Smith					Marnee Carpenter	
Ruth Martin		Diane Baker					Jayne Atkinson	

== Reception ==
=== Box office performance ===
The Hannibal Lecter films, when compared to other top-grossing American horror franchises—Alien vs. Predator, Candyman, Child's Play, The Conjuring, The Exorcist, Evil Dead, Final Destination, Friday the 13th, Halloween, Hellraiser, I Know What You Did Last Summer, Jaws, A Nightmare on Elm Street, The Omen, Paranormal Activity, Psycho, The Purge, Saw, Scream, and The Texas Chainsaw Massacre—is one of the highest grossing horror film franchises.

=== Critical reception ===
Critical response to Hannibal Lecter films
Film	Rotten Tomatoes	Metacritic
Manhunter	94% (49 reviews)	75 (22 reviews)
The Silence of the Lambs	95% (153 reviews)	86 (20 reviews)
Hannibal	39% (172 reviews)	57 (36 reviews)
Red Dragon	69% (191 reviews)	60 (36 reviews)
Hannibal Rising	16% (148 reviews)	35 (30 reviews)

Critical response to Hannibal Lecter series
Series	Season	Rotten Tomatoes	Metacritic
Hannibal	1	82% (68 reviews)	70 (32 reviews)
Hannibal	2	98% (45 reviews)	88 (14 reviews)
Hannibal	3	98% (47 reviews)	84 (15 reviews)
Clarice	1	43% (49 reviews)	56 (33 reviews)

== Musical ==
In 2005, comedian-musicians Jon and Al Kaplan, most famous for their musical re-imaginings of popular films as YouTube musicals, parodied The Silence of the Lambs, especially the film version, in Silence! The Musical. It premiered Off-off-Broadway and has since had acclaimed productions in London (2009) and Los Angeles (2012). In 2012, it won the Los Angeles Drama Critics Circle – Score, Lead Performance, Choreography Award.

In 2016, rock band Conan Neutron & the Secret Friends released their second record, The Art of Murder, a concept album which was "directly inspired by the Hannibal Lecter series of books by Thomas Harris".
