= Frederick Chilton =

- Hannibal Lecter character
- Anthony Heald as Chilton in the 1991 film The Silence of the Lambs
- First appearance: Red Dragon
- Created by: Thomas Harris
- Portrayed by: Benjamin Hendrickson (Manhunter); Anthony Heald (The Silence of the Lambs, Red Dragon); Raúl Esparza (Hannibal); Minal Patel (The Silence of the Lambs (play))

In-universe information
- Gender: Male
- Occupation: Administrator of Baltimore State Hospital for the Criminally Insane
- Nationality: American

Dr. Frederick Chilton is a fictional character appearing in Thomas Harris's novels Red Dragon (1981) and The Silence of the Lambs (1988), along with the film and television adaptations of Harris's novels.

== In the novels ==
=== Red Dragon ===
Chilton is first introduced in Harris' 1981 novel Red Dragon as the pompous, incompetent director of a sanitarium near Baltimore, Maryland, acting as the jailer for the cannibalistic serial killer Hannibal Lecter. When FBI profiler Will Graham goes to Lecter for advice on capturing another serial killer, Francis Dolarhyde, Chilton makes an unwelcome attempt to question Graham about Lecter's psyche.

When Dolarhyde learns of Graham's visits with Lecter, the two killers attempt to correspond through the classifieds of a tabloid newspaper. A cleaning crew finds one of Dolarhyde's letters, hidden within Lecter's toilet paper spool. Chilton informs Graham and his superior, Jack Crawford, of the discovery. Lecter's reply is intercepted and revealed to contain Graham's home address, which Dolarhyde uses to track down Graham in the novel's climax.

=== The Silence of the Lambs ===
In The Silence of the Lambs, Chilton allows Crawford to send an FBI trainee, Clarice Starling, to interview Lecter about another serial killer, Buffalo Bill. He makes a clumsy pass at Starling on their first meeting and she quickly rejects him. Chilton gradually grows envious of Starling's success, where he has failed, in convincing Lecter to share information. He eventually uses a recording device to eavesdrop on their interviews, from which he learns of Crawford's offer to transfer Lecter to a better prison facility in exchange for revealing Buffalo Bill's identity.

Chilton learns that the offer is a trick but sets it up anyway, then quickly hogs the spotlight as the plan's architect. Lecter is transferred, but gives false information: he claims that the killer's name is "Billy Rubin", a pun on bilirubin, a compound that colors human bile and feces and a reference to Chilton's hair color. Additionally in the novel he writes the numbers of the corresponding chemical formula under Chilton's name (C_{33}H_{36}N_{4}O_{6} = bilirubin) on a letter. In the film adaptation, he gives the name "Louis Friend", an anagram for "iron sulfide", or fool's gold, as a red herring. Lecter gives Starling the real information needed to track down Buffalo Bill.

Afterwards, Lecter makes a bloody escape from custody after using an improvised handcuff key made from a pen tube, taken from a pen which Chilton himself carelessly left in Lecter's cell, and a paper clip he was able to use only when transferred to police custody. While still on the run, Lecter sends a letter to Starling, saying she is safe and he will not come after her, and another letter to Chilton swearing gruesome vengeance. In the film adaptation, Lecter calls Starling and says he is "having an old friend for dinner", as he begins following Chilton.

=== Hannibal ===
Chilton does not appear in Hannibal. The hospital has been shut down by the time the novel's events take place. The novel mentions that Chilton disappeared while on vacation in Jamaica seven years earlier, implying Lecter killed and ate him.

== Other media ==
=== Film ===
In Manhunter (1986), the first film adaptation of Red Dragon, Chilton is played by Benjamin Hendrickson.

In both The Silence of the Lambs (1991) and Red Dragon (2002), he is played by Anthony Heald.

=== Television ===
In the TV series Hannibal, a loose adaptation of the novels, Chilton is portrayed by Raúl Esparza. In this continuity, Chilton was originally a "dangerously incompetent" surgeon who switched his specialty to psychiatry after accidentally killing a patient. In each season, as a running gag, he suffers and improbably survives gruesome and near-fatal injuries, leaving him increasingly debilitated.

==== Season 1 ====
He first appears in the episode "Entrée", in which his patient Dr. Abel Gideon (Eddie Izzard) kills a nurse after Chilton unwittingly influences him into believing that he is the serial killer known as the Chesapeake Ripper. Gideon eventually learns the truth and suffers an identity crisis, and he escapes to seek revenge against all of his previous psychiatrists, including Chilton. Gideon kidnaps and tortures Chilton, intending to leave his organs as a "gift basket" for the real Ripper. Gideon is forced to flee from the police after having removed some of Chilton's less vital organs, leaving him alive but in critical condition.

==== Season 2 ====
Chilton reappears in the second season, minus one kidney, walking with a cane, and now unable to consume protein-rich food. Will Graham (Hugh Dancy)—who has been falsely accused of the Ripper murders—is now a patient under Chilton's custody. He successfully appeals to Chilton's vanity and convinces him to help expose Hannibal Lecter (Mads Mikkelsen) as the real killer. Through Chilton's resources, Graham discovers that Lecter was inducing the blackouts and seizures he was suffering prior to his arrest. Chilton confronts Lecter with this, but claims he will keep his secret, as he is also guilty of "making a patient kill".

Graham discovers that Gideon is aware that Lecter is the Ripper. Armed with this knowledge, Graham points out to Chilton that both he and Gideon claim to know who the Ripper is, and tempts him with the intriguing possibility that the two of them might independently discover the Ripper's identity. Chilton brings Gideon back into his custody, though Gideon does not cooperate and is eventually kidnapped by Lecter. Chilton begins to believe Graham's accusations against Lecter, but attempts to maintain the pretense of ignorance when socializing with the doctor.

Lecter frames Chilton for the Ripper murders, kills two FBI agents in Chilton's home, and leaves a dying, dismembered Gideon in his basement. Chilton plans to flee the country, and tries to seek refuge with Graham, who has been exonerated. Knowing Lecter will find Chilton if he flees, Graham asks Jack Crawford (Laurence Fishburne) to arrest Chilton to protect him. During Chilton's interrogation, a surviving Ripper victim, Miriam Lass (Anna Chlumsky), is observing behind a one-way mirror. Upon hearing Chilton's voice, Lass experiences a false memory implanted by Lecter during her imprisonment of Chilton tormenting her. In a moment of blind rage, Lass draws Crawford's gun and shoots Chilton in the face through the mirror.

==== Season 3 ====
The season 3 episode "Aperitivo" reveals that Chilton survived the gunshot wound, but was disfigured, losing an eye and his upper teeth on the left side of his face. He wears makeup and prosthetics to conceal his injuries. He approaches Lecter's other surviving victims—Graham, Crawford, Alana Bloom (Caroline Dhavernas), and Mason Verger (Joe Anderson)—and entreats them to pursue Lecter. After Lecter surrenders to Crawford, he is found insane at trial and incarcerated at the Baltimore State Hospital for the Criminally Insane, initially under Chilton's care. Bloom eventually replaces Chilton as the administrator of the hospital. Chilton writes a best-selling true crime volume about Lecter that is filled with distortions and inaccuracies. He plans to write another one about "The Tooth Fairy", a serial killer who murders entire families.

Graham convinces him to give an interview with him in which they say that "The Tooth Fairy" is ugly, impotent, homosexual, and the product of incest. The killer, Francis Dolarhyde (Richard Armitage), retaliates by kidnapping Chilton and forcing him to recant his statements. He then bites Chilton's lips off and sets him on fire: (Note: In the original novel Red Dragon, this fate befalls Freddy Lounds.) Chilton survives, but is horribly burned and barely able to speak. He is last seen recuperating in an oxygen tank, accusing Graham of deliberately setting him up to be maimed.
