= Clarice Starling =

Fictional character created by Thomas Harris

Clarice M. Starling
- Hannibal Lecter character
- Jodie Foster as Starling in The Silence of the Lambs (1991)
- First appearance: The Silence of the Lambs
- Created by: Thomas Harris
- Portrayed by: Jodie Foster (The Silence of the Lambs); Masha Skorobogatov (young; The Silence of the Lambs); Julianne Moore (Hannibal); Rebecca Breeds (Clarice); Maya McNair (young; Clarice); Mollie Gallagher (The Silence of the Lambs (play))

In-universe information
- Gender: Female
- Occupation: FBI agent
- Significant other: Hannibal Lecter (novels)
- Religion: Lutheranism
- Nationality: American

Clarice M. Starling is a fictional character and protagonist of the novels The Silence of the Lambs (1988) and Hannibal (1999) by Thomas Harris.

In the 1991 film adaptation of The Silence of the Lambs, she was played by Jodie Foster, while in the 2001 film adaptation of Hannibal, she was played by Julianne Moore. In the CBS television series Clarice, she is played by Rebecca Breeds.

Clarice Starling, as portrayed by Foster, is ranked by the American Film Institute as the greatest heroine in film history. Rolling Stone and Entertainment Weekly ranked Starling as one of the "50 Greatest Movie Protagonists" and "100 Greatest Movie Characters" respectively. Foster's interpretation of Starling is highly ranked amongst the greatest screen performances of all-time, receiving a multitude of accolades including the Academy Award for Best Actress in 1992.

== The Silence of the Lambs ==
In The Silence of the Lambs, Starling is a student at the FBI Academy. Her mentor, Behavioral Sciences Unit chief Jack Crawford, sends her to interview Dr. Hannibal Lecter, a brilliant psychiatrist and cannibalistic serial killer. He is housed in a Baltimore mental institution. Upon arriving at the asylum for her first interview with Lecter, the asylum manager Frederick Chilton makes a crude pass at her, which she rebuffs; this helps her bond with Lecter, who despises Chilton. "Multiple" Miggs, the inmate in the cell next to Lecter, throws his semen at her; this offends Lecter, who "influences" Miggs to commit suicide as a way of apologizing to her.

As time passes, Lecter gives Starling information about Buffalo Bill, a currently active serial killer being hunted by the FBI, but only in exchange for personal information, which Crawford had specifically warned her to keep secret from Lecter.

Starling tells Lecter her backstory. Born on December 23, 1958 or 1961, she was raised in a small town in West Virginia by her father, a night marshal. When she was a young child, her father was shot when responding to a robbery; he died a month after the incident. Her mother managed to keep the family together for more than two years after his death, working as a motel maid in the daytime and cooking at a café at night, but she was ultimately unable to support the entire family. When Starling was ten years old, she was sent to live with her mother's cousin on a Montana sheep and horse ranch, but she ran away when she witnessed the spring lambs being slaughtered, fleeing with a mare also destined for the slaughterhouse whom she named Hannah. Starling was caught, but her mother's cousin eventually agreed to let her go, and she and Hannah both went to a Lutheran orphanage, where she spent the rest of her childhood.

According to the novel, Starling attended the University of Virginia as a double major in psychology and criminology. During that time, she spent two summers working as a counselor in a mental health center. Starling first met Crawford when he was a guest lecturer at UVA. His criminology seminars were a factor in her decision to join the FBI.

During the investigation, Starling is assigned to coax Lecter into revealing Buffalo Bill's identity. Lecter gives her clues in the form of cryptic, riddling information designed to help Starling figure it out for herself. The two grow to respect each other, so when Lecter escapes during a transfer to a state prison in Tennessee, Starling does not fear that he will kill her, as he "would consider it rude".

Starling deduces from Lecter's hints that Buffalo Bill's first victim had a personal relationship with him, and so goes to the victim's home in Belvedere, Ohio, to interview people who knew her. She unknowingly stumbles onto the killer himself, Jame Gumb, who is living under the alias "Jack Gordon". When she sees a Death's-head Moth, the same rare kind that Buffalo Bill stuffs in the throats of each of his victims, flutter through the house, she knows that she has found her man and tries to arrest him. Gumb flees, and Starling follows him into his basement, where his latest victim is alive and screaming for help. Gumb turns off the electricity in the basement, and stalks Starling through the rooms wearing night-vision goggles. As Gumb readies to shoot Starling, Starling hears him cock the hammer of his revolver and opens fire towards the sound, killing him. She is lauded as a hero in the press, and graduates with honors from the FBI Academy, becoming a full-fledged agent.

Weeks later, Lecter writes Starling a letter from a hotel room somewhere in St. Louis asking her if the lambs have stopped screaming.

The final scene of the novel has Starling sleeping peacefully at a friend's vacation house at the Maryland seashore.

== Hannibal ==
At the beginning of Hannibal, Starling is in her early 30s and still working for the FBI, although her career has been held back by Paul Krendler, a Department of Justice official who resents her because he is a misogynist, because she rejected his sexual advances, and because he believes that she humiliated him. She takes part in a bungled drug raid, in which she returns fire after a HIV positive drug kingpin fires at her, using an infant as a human shield; her superiors blame her for the resulting mess, and she is removed from active duty, mostly at Krendler's instigation. She receives a supportive letter from Lecter, who is (unknown to her at the time) residing in Florence, Italy under an alias. One of Lecter's surviving victims, a sadistic pedophile named Mason Verger, is searching for Lecter and has offered a huge reward, which corrupt Florentine police inspector Rinaldo Pazzi tries to claim when he deduces Lecter's true identity in Florence.

Starling finds out that Lecter is in Florence and attempts to warn Pazzi. As Starling predicted, Lecter knows about the plot to capture him and, as a result, he kills Pazzi. Lecter then flees to the United States and immediately starts to follow Starling. Starling, meanwhile, is being harassed at the FBI by various corrupt agents, especially by Krendler, who is secretly assisting Verger in his attempt to capture Lecter. Starling attempts to find Lecter first, not only to capture him but also to save him from Verger. Krendler attempts to frame Starling in a scheme planned by Verger, alleging she sent coded newspaper messages to Lecter; this only results in her being suspended, but she is now powerless to stop Verger's men. Lecter is captured by Verger, who plans to feed him to a pack of specially bred wild boars.

Julianne Moore as Starling in Hannibal; Lecter (played by Anthony Hopkins) is in the background.

Starling is aware that Lecter is being held by Verger, so she attempts to save him so she can bring him in to the authorities. Following Verger's death at the hands of his sister Margot, Starling uses the distraction to try to rescue Lecter. She is wounded in the ensuing gunfight with Verger's men, but Lecter rescues her and nurses her back to health. He then subjects her to a regimen of psychoactive drugs in the course of therapy sessions to help her heal from her childhood trauma and her pent-up anger at the injustices of the world. He considers whether his long-dead younger sister Mischa may somehow be able to live again through Starling.

During this time, Lecter captures Krendler and performs a craniotomy on him while he is still alive. During an elaborate dinner, Lecter scoops spoonfuls of Krendler's forebrain to saute with lemon and capers. In the novel, he serves Krendler's brain to Starling, who finds it delicious.

Lecter's plan for Mischa to live again within Starling ultimately fails, as she refuses to have her own personality sublimated, and he only briefly entertains the idea of Mischa taking his place. Starling then opens her dress and offers her breasts to Lecter; he accepts her offer and the two become lovers. They disappear together, only to be sighted again three years later entering the Teatro Colón Opera House in Buenos Aires by former orderly Barney, who had treated Lecter with respect while he was incarcerated in Baltimore. Fearing for his life, Barney leaves Buenos Aires immediately, never to return.

The reader then learns that Lecter and Starling are living together in an "exquisite" Beaux Arts mansion, where they employ servants and engage in activities such as learning new languages and dancing together and building their own respective memory palaces, and is told that "Sex is a splendid structure they add to every day", that the psychoactive drugs "have had no part in their lives for a long time", and that Lecter is "satisfied" with the fact that Mischa cannot return.

== Films ==
In the film adaptation of The Silence of the Lambs, Starling's role remains relatively unchanged from the book. However, the film adaptation of Hannibal significantly diverges from the novel's conclusion. In the film, Lecter neither attempts to brainwash Starling nor feeds her Krendler's brain (although he does feed portions of it to Krendler himself); instead, Starling tries to apprehend Lecter, but he overpowers her and she handcuffs both of them to the refrigerator in an attempt to keep him in the house before the imminent arrival of the police. Lecter then cuts off his own hand and escapes, leaving Starling to explain the situation to the police. He is later seen on a plane, apparently fleeing the country again.

Although she won the Academy Award for Best Actress for playing Starling in The Silence of the Lambs, Jodie Foster decided not to reprise her role in Hannibal. Julianne Moore portrayed the character in the sequel, with Anthony Hopkins himself recommending her for the role after his previous experience working with her in the film Surviving Picasso.

== Television ==
=== Lifetime ===
In May 2012, Lifetime announced that they were developing a television series centered on Clarice Starling after her graduation from the FBI academy, titled Clarice, which was to be produced by MGM. The project did not go forward.

=== NBC ===
Bryan Fuller, the creator of the TV series Hannibal, stated prior to the show's cancellation his desire to include Clarice Starling as a character in the fifth season, provided that he could get the rights from MGM. He said that he planned for the show's fifth season to cover the events of The Silence of the Lambs, and the sixth to cover the events of Hannibal, with the seventh to be an original storyline resolving Hannibal's ending. Since the series' cancellation, Fuller has stated that should the series continue and should they obtain rights to adapt The Silence of the Lambs, Elliot Page or a person of color would be ideal casting for the role of Clarice Starling.

=== CBS ===
CBS developed the Clarice TV series as a sequel to The Silence of the Lambs set in 1993, created by Alex Kurtzman and Jenny Lumet. The series stars Rebecca Breeds as the titular character, along with Lucca De Oliveira, Devyn A. Tyler, Kal Penn, Nick Sandow, Michael Cudlitz, and Marnee Carpenter, and premiered on February 11, 2021, on CBS. It was effectively cancelled in June after one season because of low ratings and the breakdown of talks concerning the series' planned move from CBS to Paramount+.
