= The Silence of the Lambs (play) =

2026 stage adaptation

- Written by: Gina Gionfriddo
- Based on: The Silence of the Lambs by Thomas Harris
- Characters: Clarice Starling; Hannibal Lecter; Jame Gumb; Jack Crawford
- Genre: Psychological Thriller

Premiere
- Date: 1 August 2026
- Place: Curve, Leicester
- Directed by: Nikolai Foster
- https://silenceofthelambsplay.com/

The Silence of the Lambs is a psychological thriller play written by American playwright and television writer Gina Gionfriddo. Its story is based on the novel of the same name by Thomas Harris but takes a large amount of visual inspiration from the 1991 feature-length film.

The play is in two acts and is around two hours long. It follows FBI trainee Clarice Starling who uses the genius imprisoned psychiatrist and mass murderer Dr Hannibal 'The Cannibal' Lecter to garner information about an unidentified serial killer only known as Buffalo Bill who murders and flays young women before dumping them in large bodies of water, in exchange for personal information about Clarice's childhood traumas.

== Production ==
The play was scheduled to have its world premiere at the Curve in Leicester from 1 to 15 August 2026, before touring the UK and Ireland until June 2027. The play is directed by Curve artistic director Nikolai Foster, with a cast including John Partridge as Hannibal Lecter and Mollie Gallagher as Clarice Starling.

== Cast and characters ==
Character	UK and Ireland tour
Character	2026 - 2027
Hannibal Lecter	John Partridge
Clarice Starling	Mollie Gallagher
Buffalo Bill	Sam Jackson
Jack Crawford	Oliver Farnworth
Frederick Chilton	Minal Patel
Senator Ruth Martin / Kimberly Emberg	Jo Mousley
Catherine Martin / Frederica Bimmel	Lottie Amour
Lucas / Pilcher / Greg	Mark Peachey
Peterson / Lamar / Pembry	Andrew Joshi
Brigham / Miggs	Jonny Magnanti
Ensemble	Mary Timbrell-Hill

== Reception ==
Mark Lawson of The Guardian praised Nikolai Foster's imaginative staging and described the production as "a show worth seeing".
