= The Silence of the Lambs (soundtrack) =

Film score by Howard Shore
- Released: February 5, 1991
- Genre: Film score
- Length: 56:22
- Label: MCA
- Producer: Howard Shore

Howard Shore chronology
| A Kiss Before Dying (1991) | The Silence of the Lambs (1991) | Naked Lunch (1991) |

The Silence of the Lambs (The Original Motion Picture Score) is the film score for the 1991 horror film directed by Jonathan Demme. Composed by Howard Shore, the soundtrack was released by MCA Records on CD, LP, and cassette on February 5, 1991. The original release featured 13 tracks. An expanded edition, including previously unreleased material, was released by Quartet Records on February 14, 2018, and reissued in 2021 to coincide with the film's 30th anniversary.

== Background ==
The musical score for The Silence of the Lambs was composed by Howard Shore in his first collaboration with Jonathan Demme. Shore aimed to compose music that seamlessly fit into the fabric of the film, stating, "When you watch the movie, you are not aware of the music. You get your feelings from all elements simultaneously: lighting, cinematography, costumes, acting, music." Demme was specific about the film's music and provided valuable suggestions to Shore on constructing the musical score and sound.

The score was recorded in Munich during the latter half of the summer of 1990 and was performed by the Munich Symphony Orchestra. Suzana Peric edited the musical score. While recording, Shore scored the film to the edit, appreciating Jodie Foster's performance as Clarice Starling and calling it "fascinating." He felt that the film's score benefitted from the collaboration between the music and sound design.

== Release ==
A soundtrack album consisting of 13 tracks was released by MCA Records on February 5, 1991. An expanded edition of the score, containing 25 tracks, was released by Quartet Records on February 14, 2018. This edition included nine tracks not present in the original release, one unused cue, and two alternative tracks. The expanded edition was reissued in 2021 for the film's 30th anniversary.

Music from the film was later used in the trailers for its 2001 sequel, Hannibal.

== Reception ==
Filmtracks.com wrote, "You'll likely respect this score and appreciate its impact in the film, but most listeners will rarely revisit it on either of its unpleasant, oppressive albums." According to critic Roger Ebert, "Howard Shore's mournful music sets a funereal tone." Todd McCarthy of Variety wrote, "Howard Shore’s rather traditional score outstandingly amplifies the tension and psychological mystery." Scott Tobias of The Guardian described it as an "ominous yet subtly poignant score."

== Track listing ==
=== Standard edition ===
The Silence of the Lambs (The Original Motion Picture Score) track listing
| No. | Title | Length |
|---|---|---|
| 1. | "Main Title" | 5:04 |
| 2. | "The Asylum" | 3:53 |
| 3. | "Clarice" | 3:03 |
| 4. | "Return to the Asylum" | 2:35 |
| 5. | "The Abduction" | 3:01 |
| 6. | "Quid Pro Quo" | 4:41 |
| 7. | "Lecter in Memphis" | 5:41 |
| 8. | "Lambs Screaming" | 5:34 |
| 9. | "Lecter Escapes" | 5:06 |
| 10. | "Belvedere, Ohio" | 3:32 |
| 11. | "The Moth" | 2:20 |
| 12. | "The Cellar" | 7:02 |
| 13. | "Finale" | 4:50 |
| Total length: | | 56:22 |

=== Expanded edition ===
The Silence of the Lambs (Expanded Original MGM Motion Picture Soundtrack) track listing
| No. | Title | Length |
|---|---|---|
| 1. | "Main Title" | 5:05 |
| 2. | "Bulletin Board" | 1:13 |
| 3. | "Visit to Lecter / You Look Like a Rube" | 4:01 |
| 4. | "Miggs" | 1:16 |
| 5. | "First Flashback / FBI Montage" | 2:10 |
| 6. | "Clarice" (film version) | 3:05 |
| 7. | "I'll Help You" | 1:12 |
| 8. | "The Abduction" | 3:03 |
| 9. | "West Virginia Car Ride" | 0:52 |
| 10. | "Rock of Ages Flashback" | 1:09 |
| 11. | "The Bug Cocoon / Washington" | 2:13 |
| 12. | "Death Head Moth" | 1:19 |
| 13. | "Quid Pro Quo, Yes or No" | 3:33 |
| 14. | "Lecter in Memphis" | 5:42 |
| 15. | "Lambs Screaming" | 5:36 |
| 16. | "Lecter Escapes" | 6:13 |
| 17. | "Laundromat" | 1:18 |
| 18. | "Belvedere, Ohio" | 3:33 |
| 19. | "To Calumet City" | 2:39 |
| 20. | "The Moth" | 2:20 |
| 21. | "The Cellar" | 7:02 |
| 22. | "Finale" | 4:51 |
| 23. | "Clarice" | 3:03 |
| 24. | "Death Head Moth" (alternate) | 0:57 |
| 25. | "Drops of Blood" ("Lecter Escapes" alternate excerpt) | 2:53 |
| Total length: | | 76:18 |

== Personnel ==
Credits adapted from liner notes.

- Composer, producer and conductor – Howard Shore
- Orchestra – The Munich Symphony Orchestra
- Orchestration – Homer Denison
- Orchestra manager – Paul Talkington
- Programming – John Mahoney
- Recording – Alan Snelling
- Sound design – Eugene Gearty, Skip Lievsay
- Mixing – Gary Chester
- Mastering – Vlado Meller
- Music editor – Suzana Peric
- Assistant music editor – Nick Ratner
- Executive producer – Gary Goetzman, Jonathan Demme
- Music supervision – Sharon Boyle
- Music co-ordinator – Barklie K. Griggs, Dana K. Sano, Jennifer Richardson
- Copyist – Vic Fraser
- Art direction – JA
- Design – Georgopoulos Design

== Accolades ==
Accolades for The Silence of the Lambs (Original Motion Picture Soundtrack)
| Year | Organization | Award | Nominee | Result | Ref. |
|---|---|---|---|---|---|
| 1991 | British Academy Film Awards | Best Film Music | Howard Shore | Nominated | |
