= The Life and Deaths of Wilson Shedd =

- Directed by: Tim Blake Nelson
- Written by: Tim Blake Nelson
- Produced by: Julie Buck; Tim Blake Nelson; Ryan Bartecki; Miles David Romney; Billy Hines
- Starring: Amanda Seyfried; Scoot McNairy; Missi Pyle; William Jackson Harper; Elizabeth Marvel; Grant Harvey; Devyn Tyler; Wunmi Mosaku; Benjamin Brown
- Cinematography: Benoit Soler
- Edited by: Luke Ciarrocchi
- Production companies: QWGmire; Co Created Media; V42; Red Barn Films
- Release date: September 13, 2026 (TIFF)
- Country: United States
- Language: English

The Life and Deaths of Wilson Shedd is a 2026 American prison drama thriller film written, produced, and directed by Tim Blake Nelson.

== Cast ==
- Amanda Seyfried as Karen
- Scoot McNairy as Wilson Shedd
- Missi Pyle
- William Jackson Harper
- Elizabeth Marvel
- Grant Harvey
- Devyn Tyler
- Wunmi Mosaku

== Production ==
In May 2025, it was announced that principal photography had begun in Georgia on a prison thriller film written, produced, and directed by Tim Blake Nelson. Amanda Seyfried, Scoot McNairy, Missi Pyle, William Jackson Harper, Elizabeth Marvel, Grant Harvey, Devyn Tyler joined the cast with QWGmire co-financing, and Benoit Soler served as the cinematographer. Wunmi Mosaku rounded out the cast by next month. Filming wrapped in August 2025.

== Distribution ==
The film premiered at the 2026 Toronto International Film Festival on 13 September.

The film will compete at the 21st Rome Film Festival in 'Progressive Cinema Competition - Visions for the World of Tomorrow' in October 2026.

== Reception ==
On review aggregator Rotten Tomatoes, the film holds an approval rating of 81% based on 16 reviews, with an average rating of 7.4/10. Metacritic, which uses a weighted average, assigned the film a score of 74 out of 100, based on 8 critics, indicating "generally favorable reviews".
