= Jack Crawford (character) =

- Hannibal Lecter character
- Four on-screen versions of Jack Crawford (clockwise from top left): Dennis Farina, Scott Glenn, Laurence Fishburne, Harvey Keitel.
- First appearance: Red Dragon
- Created by: Thomas Harris
- Portrayed by: Dennis Farina (Manhunter); Scott Glenn (The Silence of the Lambs); Harvey Keitel (Red Dragon); Laurence Fishburne (Hannibal); Oliver Farnworth (The Silence of the Lambs (play))

In-universe information
- Gender: Male
- Occupation: BSU Agent-in-Charge
- Significant other: Phyllis "Bella" Crawford
- Nationality: American

Jack Crawford is a fictional character who appears in the Hannibal Lecter series of novels by Thomas Harris, in which Crawford is the Agent-in-Charge of the Behavioral Science Unit of the FBI in Quantico, Virginia. He is modeled after John E. Douglas, who held the same position.

== Red Dragon ==
Jack Crawford first appears in the novel Red Dragon, in which he calls upon Will Graham, his former protégé, for assistance in solving the murders being committed by a serial killer dubbed "The Tooth Fairy." Graham, as a profiler, has a reputation for being able to think like the criminals whom he hunts, thus assisting the FBI in a criminal's ultimate apprehension. Graham had retired after being attacked and nearly killed by Dr. Hannibal Lecter, a Baltimore psychiatrist who had previously treated the victim of a murder that Graham was investigating, after Graham intuited that Lecter was the killer he sought. Crawford convinces Graham to come out of retirement to help solve the "Tooth Fairy" murders, and soon they both realize that they would need Lecter's help again. Crawford helps shelter Graham and his family after Lecter sends the killer, Francis Dolarhyde, his old nemesis' address. With Crawford's help, Graham eventually solves the case, but Dolarhyde disfigures him before Graham's wife kills him. Crawford feels responsible for Graham's misfortune, and resents Lecter for the rest of his life.

== The Silence of the Lambs ==
Jack Crawford appears again in the novel The Silence of the Lambs, again investigating a serial killer. This time, the serial killer is called "Buffalo Bill", and his killing signature involves killing and skinning women. Crawford is stumped in trying to determine who Buffalo Bill is, and is forced to once again call upon Lecter for assistance. This time, however, Crawford sends an FBI trainee, Clarice Starling, to interview him. By way of information obtained from Lecter, Crawford and the FBI attempt to track down the killer, Jame Gumb. However, the address they obtain for him is out of date. Gumb had killed the employer of one of his former victims and moved into her house to use its large basement, which contains a disused and empty well. He uses the well as a makeshift holding space for his victims. Realizing that Buffalo Bill probably knew his first victim, Fredrica Bimmel, Starling sets about interviewing everyone close to her and ends up stumbling upon Gumb's house. By the time local police and firemen arrive to help, Starling has singlehandedly killed Gumb and rescued his intended victim.

Throughout the novel, Crawford is struggling under a double burden, as he is caring for his terminally ill wife, Bella, at home while leading the investigation into the 'Buffalo Bill' case. Bella dies near the end of the novel.

== Hannibal ==
Crawford appears as a relatively minor character in the book Hannibal. He is portrayed as very sympathetic toward Starling, yet increasingly distant due to failing health and his powerlessness against the corrupt bureaucrats set to destroy her career. Late in the novel, Crawford is forced into leave from the FBI, and soon dies of a heart attack.

== Film and television adaptations ==
The Crawford character appears in the film adaptations of Red Dragon and The Silence of the Lambs; he does not appear in the adaptation of Hannibal, although a deleted scene explains that he has died. He has been portrayed by four different actors:

- Dennis Farina in Manhunter, the 1986 film adaptation of Red Dragon.
- Scott Glenn in The Silence of the Lambs.

In the supplemental section on the special edition DVD of The Silence of the Lambs, Scott Glenn revealed that he was given an audio tape by FBI agent John Douglas as a form of research for his character. The tape was an audio recording serial killers Lawrence Bittaker and Roy Norris had made of themselves raping and torturing a 16-year-old girl as they drove around Los Angeles. Upon questioning Douglas as to his motives for presenting these tapes, Douglas simply said to Glenn, "Now you are part of my world." This experience preyed upon Glenn's mind all throughout filming, and he refused to return to the role in Hannibal because he did not want to place himself in such a mindset again. To this day, he says that the tapes still cause him anxiety and bad dreams.

- Harvey Keitel in the 2002 adaptation of Red Dragon, which uses the novel's original title.
- Laurence Fishburne in the television adaptation Hannibal.

=== Hannibal television series storyline ===
The TV series portrays Crawford as deliberately pushing the limits of Graham's sanity in order to fully exploit his protegé's gift for profiling serial killers. At the end of the first season, he reluctantly arrests Graham after finding evidence that he is responsible for several murders; he is unaware that in actuality Lecter is the true culprit and had framed Graham.

When Graham is exonerated in the second season, Crawford helps him with an elaborate plan to entrap and capture Lecter, which puts Crawford's career in jeopardy when his superiors at the FBI learn of it. In the second-season finale, Crawford attempts to arrest Lecter, but Lecter escapes after severely injuring him.

The third season reveals that Crawford survives his injuries, but is forced into retirement from the FBI. At about this time, Crawford's wife, Bella, dies of lung cancer. He tracks down Lecter in Florence, Italy, and engages him in brutal hand-to-hand combat. Lecter escapes and later forces Crawford to watch as he prepares to perform a craniotomy on Graham. They are interrupted by corrupt Italian detectives working for Lecter's surviving victim Mason Verger, who take Graham and Lecter away to Verger's estate. After Lecter and Graham escape from Verger's clutches, Crawford—who has been reinstated by the FBI—goes to Graham's house, where Lecter voluntarily surrenders to him.

Three years later, Crawford asks Graham, who has retired from the FBI, to help catch a serial killer dubbed "The Tooth Fairy" who kills entire families. Along with Graham and Dr. Alana Bloom, Crawford arranges to use Lecter as bait for the killer, Francis Dolarhyde. Following Lecter's subsequent escape, a cut epilogue shows Crawford continuing to hunt for him.

Paul Doro of Shock Till You Drop, reviewing early episodes of the TV series, said that Fishburne was "very good" but that "a sudden detour into Crawford’s marriage is mostly dull and takes us away from far more fruitful storylines".
