= Hannibal Rising (film) =

2007 film by Peter Webber

- Theatrical release poster
- Directed by: Peter Webber
- Screenplay by: Thomas Harris
- Based on: Hannibal Rising by Thomas Harris
- Produced by: Dino De Laurentiis; Martha De Laurentiis; Tarak Ben Ammar
- Starring: Gaspard Ulliel; Gong Li; Rhys Ifans; Dominic West
- Cinematography: Ben Davis
- Edited by: Pietro Scalia; Valerio Bonelli
- Music by: Ilan Eshkeri; Shigeru Umebayashi
- Production companies: Dino De Laurentiis Cinematografica; Dino De Laurentiis Company; Carthago Films; Zephyr Films; Etic Films
- Distributed by: Filmauro (Italy); Quinta Communications (France); Momentum Pictures (United Kingdom); SPI International (Czech Republic); The Weinstein Company Metro-Goldwyn-Mayer (United States)
- Release dates: 7 February 2007 (France); 9 February 2007 (Italy, United States and United Kingdom); 22 February 2007 (Czech Republic)
- Running time: 121 minutes
- Countries: Italy; United Kingdom; Czech Republic; France; United States
- Languages: English; German; Russian
- Budget: $75 million
- Box office: $82.1 million

Hannibal Rising is a 2007 psychological horror thriller film and the fifth film of the Hannibal Lecter franchise. (Note: The franchise has five films, the first being a standalone film, making Hannibal Rising the fifth franchise film and the fourth of the Dino De Laurentiis Company production.) It is a prequel to The Silence of the Lambs (1991), Hannibal (2001), and Red Dragon (2002). The film is an adaptation of Thomas Harris' 2006 novel of the same name and tells the story of Lecter's evolution from a vengeful Lithuanian Nazi collaborator hunter into a cannibalistic serial killer.

The film was directed by Peter Webber from a screenplay by Harris, and stars Gaspard Ulliel as the title character with additional roles played by Gong Li, Rhys Ifans and Dominic West. Filming took place at Barrandov Studios in Prague. It was co-produced by Italy, United Kingdom, Czech Republic, France, and the United States. It was released in France on February 7, 2007, and in Italy, United Kingdom, and the United States on February 9. It was produced by the Dino De Laurentiis Company and theatrical distribution was handled by Momentum Pictures in the UK, and by The Weinstein Company and Metro-Goldwyn-Mayer in the US. The film received generally negative reviews from critics, though Ulliel's performance as Lecter was praised. It grossed $82.1 million worldwide against a $75 million budget. The film went on to become a hit on home video.

== Plot ==
In 1944, eight-year-old Hannibal Lecter lives in Lecter Castle in Lithuania. The Nazi invasion of the Soviet Union turns the Baltic region into part of the bloodiest front line of World War II. Lecter, his younger sister Mischa, and their parents travel to the family's hunting lodge in the woods to elude the advancing German troops. After three years, the Germans are finally driven out of the countries soon to be re-occupied by the Soviet Union. During their retreat, they destroy a Soviet tank that had stopped at the Lecter family's lodge looking for water. The explosion kills everyone but Lecter and Mischa. They survive in the cottage until five Lithuanian men from a Waffen-SS militia, led by Vladis Grutas, storm and loot it. Finding no other food in the bitterly cold Baltic winter, the men look menacingly at Lecter and Mischa with Vladis stating "we must eat or die".

In 1952, Lithuania is a part of the Soviet Union, and Lecter Castle has been converted into an orphanage, which also houses Hannibal. After dealing violently with a bully, Lecter escapes from the orphanage to Paris to live with his widowed aunt, Lady Murasaki, who teaches him Japanese martial arts including Kenjutsu. While in France, Lecter flourishes as a student. He commits his first murder as a teenager, using a katana sword to behead a local butcher for insulting his aunt. He is suspected of the murder by Inspector Pascal Popil, a French detective who also lost his family in the war. Thanks in part to his aunt's intervention, as she leaves the butcher's head on the gates in front of the station during Lecter's interview, Lecter escapes responsibility for the crime.

Lecter becomes the youngest person to be admitted to medical school in France. He works in Paris, where he is given a job preparing cadavers. One day, Lecter witnesses a condemned war criminal receiving a sodium thiopental injection, allowing him to recall details about his war crimes. Consequently, to recall the names of those responsible for his sister's death, Lecter injects himself with the solution. His subsequent flashback reveals the men who killed Mischa had cannibalized her as well. Lecter returns to Lithuania in search of his sister's remains. He excavates the ruins of the lodge where his family died and upon finding Mischa's remains, he gives her a proper burial. He also unearths the dog-tags of the men who killed his sister. One of them, Enrikas Dortlich, sees him arrive in the country and attempts to kill him but Lecter incapacitates him. After he buries Mischa's remains, Lecter forces Dortlich to reveal the whereabouts of the rest of his gang, then decapitates Dortlich with a horse-drawn pulley. Dortlich's blood splashes on Lecter's face, and he licks it off.

Lecter then visits the restaurant of another one of the soldiers, Petras Kolnas, in Fontainebleau. He finds his young daughter and notices Mischa's bracelet on her and gives her Kolnas's dogtag. Dortlich's murder puts the rest of the group on the alert and, because of the similarity to the first murder, places Lecter under renewed suspicion from Popil. Grutas, now a sex trafficker, sends a second member of the group, Zigmas Milko, to kill him. Lecter kills Milko, drowning him in embalming chemicals inside his laboratory. Popil then tries to dissuade him from hunting the gang. During a confrontation with Lady Murasaki, she begs him not to get revenge. He refuses, claiming that he made a promise to Mischa. He then attacks Grutas in his home but Grutas is rescued by his bodyguards.

Grutas kidnaps Lady Murasaki and calls Lecter, using her as bait. Lecter recognizes the sounds of Kolnas's birds from his restaurant in the background. Lecter goes there and plays on Kolnas's emotions by threatening his children. Kolnas gives up the location of Grutas's boat but Lecter kills him when Kolnas goes for Lecter's gun. Lecter goes to the houseboat and finds Grutas sexually assaulting Lady Murasaki. In a final confrontation, Grutas claims that Lecter had also consumed his sister in broth fed to him by the soldiers and he was killing them to keep this fact secret. Enraged by the revelation, Lecter eviscerates Grutas by repeatedly carving his sister's initial into his body. Lady Murasaki, finally disturbed by his behavior, flees from him even after he tells her that he loves her. The houseboat is incinerated and Lecter, assumed to be dead, emerges from the woods. He then hunts the last member of the group, Grentz, in Melville, Canada, before settling down in Canada and later the United States.

== Cast ==
- Gaspard Ulliel as Hannibal Lecter
  - Aaran Thomas as young Hannibal Lecter
- Gong Li as Lady Murasaki
- Dominic West as Inspector Pascal Popil
- Rhys Ifans as Vladis Grutas
- Helena-Lia Tachovska as Mischa Lecter
- Kevin McKidd as Petras Kolnas
- Richard Brake as Enrikas Dortlich
- Stephen Walters as Zigmas Milko
- Ivan Marevich as Bronys Grentz
- Charles Maquignon as Paul Momund
- Ingeborga Dapkūnaitė as Mrs. Lecter
- Beata Ben Ammar as Madam Kolnas
- Pavel Bezdek as Dieter
- Goran Kostić as Kazys Porvik
- Robbie Kay as Kolnas's son
- Denis Ménochet as Chief of Police

== Production ==
=== Development ===
The screenplay for Hannibal Rising was written by Thomas Harris, based on his novel of the same name, published in December 2006, two months before the film's release.

Producer Martha De Laurentiis said the idea for the film came up during the international publicity tour for Red Dragon in 2002, when journalists suggested that they should make a film about the young Hannibal. She then approached Harris to write both the new book and the screenplay for the film. Dino De Laurentiis owned the movie rights to the character Hannibal Lecter and wanted to make a new movie. De Laurentiis told Entertainment Weekly in 2006 that he told Harris that if he did not want to write the prequel, he would do it with someone else because De Laurentiis did not want to lose the franchise, and he believed the audience wanted a new movie. At first, Harris refused to write a new book, until De Laurentiis insisted that he would find someone else to write it instead, so Harris told him that he would come up with an idea. Recalling that conversation with De Laurentiis in a 2019 interview for The New York Times, Harris said, "He did have continuation rights to the character and could have done whatever he wanted to. He had a lot of enthusiasm for a movie, and it was contagious, I suppose."

In May 2003, during the Cannes Film Festival, Dino De Laurentiis sold the project to buyers, then titled The Lecter Variation and subtitled as The Story of Young Hannibal Lecter. Universal Pictures was slated to handle the film's international sales. De Laurentiis said that four actors would play Lecter at the ages of 12, 16, 20 and 25.

On 2 November 2004, Variety reported that Peter Webber had been hired to direct the film, and that production was expected to begin in May 2005 for a summer 2006 release.

On 19 May 2005, Variety reported that Bob and Harvey Weinstein's then unnamed new company, that would later become The Weinstein Company, had acquired North American distribution for the film.

The film's working title was Young Hannibal: Behind the Mask. It was produced by Dino De Laurentiis Cinematografica from Italy, and Dino De Laurentiis Company from the United States, and co-produced by France's Carthago Films, United Kingdom's Zephyr Films, and Czech Republic's Etic Films, in association with France's Quinta Communications and UK's Ingenious Film Partners. Dino De Laurentiis, Martha De Laurentiis and Tarak Ben Ammar served as producers. The budget was $75 million. US distribution was handled by MGM and The Weinstein Company, the latter also handled international sales.

=== Casting ===
Hugh Dancy, Macaulay Culkin, Dominic Cooper, and Tom Payne auditioned for the role of Hannibal Lecter. Dancy would later play Will Graham on the television series Hannibal (2013–2015).

On 20 February 2005, Chinese actress Gong Li was the first to be announced in the cast. Li almost lost out on the role of Hannibal's Japanese aunt (by marriage) Lady Murasaki, due to scheduling conflicts with Miami Vice (2006). The filming schedule for Hannibal Rising had to be changed in order to keep Li in the film. "It caused all sorts of problems but it was worth the wait. Every minute that she is on screen is a moment of truth and beauty. She's so subtle but so strong. She is an actress who is at the top of her powers," Webber said.

On 2 September 2005, French cinema website AlloCiné reported that French actor Gaspard Ulliel was one of the favorites to play Hannibal Lecter, but that nothing had been signed yet. Ulliel was confirmed in the role on 14 September 2005. Ulliel auditioned for Hannibal Rising after Dino De Laurentiis saw him in the 2004 French film A Very Long Engagement. "I saw the face of this young star and I thought this is it! We met with Gaspard in Paris, Peter did a screen test with him at my house and it was all up there on the screen, his intensity, his look. I remember I said 'Gaspard, you were born to be Hannibal Lecter!'", De Laurentiis said in the film's press kit, and director Peter Webber added: "It comes down to a gut feeling. I watched Gaspard's screen test and I thought, this is the only person that I am compelled to watch for two hours. There's something very special about him. He's got something dark." Ulliel was at a dinner in Paris when he met French producer Tarak Ben Ammar, who talked about this project to him, then he received the screenplay a few days later. The day before his audition, Ulliel watched Silence of the Lambs to observe Anthony Hopkins' acting. Ulliel initially refused the role several times for thinking it was very risky, but after meeting with Webber he changed his mind and accepted the role.

It was rumored that Anthony Hopkins would narrate the film, but it ended up not happening.

For the role of Vladis Grutas, Webber said he was looking at more obvious choices to play "bad guys", until Welsh actor Rhys Ifans came in and surprised him. At the time, Ifans was better known for his comic roles, and Webber said he was intrigued with the idea of casting someone against type. "What convinced me was that he came and he didn't audition. He just blew my socks off. I was really just seeing him because I had met him beforehand, you know, to keep tabs on him, because he might be interesting, but no one else could hold a candle to him, really. He just managed to reach in and find a very dark part of himself and have fun with it as well. He's a great actor, he's a great guy. It was a delight for me to cast him," Webber said.

Webber approached Swedish actor Mikael Persbrandt for the role of a soldier who eats Hannibal's little sister, but Persbrandt had to turn it down due to scheduling conflicts with another film and a play in Sweden. Webber told Persbrandt that if Hannibal Rising was successful, he would be cast for a second film about the young Hannibal.

French actor Denis Ménochet was friends with Ulliel and one day he visited him on the set in Prague and Ulliel gave him a tour of the studios. When Ménochet was about to leave, the film's assistant director stopped him and said that he was going to stay and play a small role in the film as a police officer at the morgue. Ménochet initially believed that he had gotten the role because he had met the director and auditioned for the film, but he later found out that it was Ulliel who supported the idea. Ulliel never told him that. Ménochet said that acting in an international film like Hannibal Rising opened doors for him and gave him the opportunity to meet people and have access to auditions.

=== Pre-production ===
Ulliel said he did not want to try to copy or imitate Anthony Hopkins, so he tried to work on his own by reading books and watching other films. He said he knew that the audience would look for similarities between him and Hopkins, so one part of his preparation included observing Hopkins, but just to pick a few details in his performance and then add it to his own character. Ulliel prepared for the role by reading all of the previous three books on Hannibal Lecter written by Thomas Harris. He also read other books about serial killers that were written by criminal profilers. Webber gave Ulliel some DVDs of films which illustrated the atmosphere he wanted in Hannibal Rising, and also made him watch Asian samurai sword films. Webber also sent Ulliel to a medical school in Prague to watch an autopsy class for one day. Webber said he thought Ulliel would be horrified, but he came back telling him he wanted to watch an autopsy again the next day. Ulliel said he watched the autopsies for the last three days of the last week of the class, when the bodies were "completely destroyed" and looked "fake", so it was not scary. Ulliel then asked to go back on the first day of the next class to see the fresh bodies being opened, but it did not happen due to his busy schedule.

Hannibal Rising was Ulliel's second English-language film, but the first one in which he played a lead role. Ulliel had only a month and a half of coaching in English before shooting began, as filming had to be quick to fit in with the time that Gong Li had available. Ulliel said that he did his best, but it was very difficult for him to act in English, and he had trouble with letting himself go and stop thinking about his accent.

For the sword fight scene, Ulliel practiced for a week with a kendo teacher and actress Gong Li.

The producers wanted to arrange a meeting between Ulliel and Anthony Hopkins so they could discuss the role, as Ulliel would play the younger version of the character that was portrayed by Hopkins in the franchise's three previous films, The Silence of the Lambs (1991), Hannibal (2001) and Red Dragon (2002), but Hopkins was not available and the meeting never happened.

=== Filming ===
Principal photography began in Prague on 10 October 2005. Filming took place at Barrandov Studios in Prague. It was also shot on location in France and Lithuania. Filming wrapped in Prague in early February 2006, after 14 weeks of shooting.

Two items were stolen from the set; a severed rubber head that was used when Hannibal cuts off Dortlich's head, and a rubber penis that was cut off from a full-size replica human body that was used in a scene where Hannibal is working on a body.

=== Post-production ===
Webber said that several violent scenes were cut before the film was sent to the ratings board, because the filmmakers thought that it was "a little bit too strong", but that it would probably be revealed in a Director's Cut later on. An unrated version was later made available on DVD.

== Reception ==
=== Critical response ===
On Rotten Tomatoes the film holds an approval rating of 16% based on 148 reviews, with an average rating of 4.10/10. The website's critics consensus reads: "Hannibal Rising reduces the horror icon to a collection of dime-store psychological traits." Metacritic assigned the film a weighted average score of 35 out of 100 based on 30 critics, indicating "generally unfavorable" reviews. Audiences polled by CinemaScore gave the film an average grade of "B−" on an A+ to F scale.

Michael J. Lee of Radio Free Entertainment wrote, "While the film is obviously missing Lambs' brilliant dynamic between Hopkins and Jodie Foster (and even the chemistry between Hopkins and Edward Norton that the subsequent Red Dragon enjoyed), there are bright spots. In particular, Gaspard Ulliel in the lead role is impressive, suggesting the mannerisms of Hopkins' Lecter while clearly avoiding an outright impersonation. His Lecter is still young and inexperienced, but demonstrates the seed of something sinister--it is easy to see how the character's role as a misguided avenging angel will eventually lead to his fall from grace." Screen International wrote that Ulliel's body language "is genuinely chilling. He has a slight sexiness, as if he's turned on, to his masochistic smile. And the way he turns his face, inflates his cheeks and snarls like Billy Idol is attention-getting. That said, his performance is so mannered and controlled that one wants to open a window after a while and let in some life," and that Gong Li "is alluring and attractive in her seductively colourful bathrobes, but the love interest between her and the younger Ulliel has an incestuous quality that's decidedly unpleasant."

The film was nominated for, but did not win, two Golden Raspberry Awards. They were for Worst Prequel or Sequel (lost to Daddy Day Camp) and Worst Excuse for a Horror Movie (lost to I Know Who Killed Me).

=== Box office ===
The film opened at No. 2 in the United States with $13.4 million from 3,003 theaters, finishing behind Norbit ($33.7 million), which was released during the same week as Hannibal Rising. In its second week of release, Hannibal Rising dropped to No. 7 at the U.S. box office, making $5.5 million, a 58.5% drop from the previous week. It dropped out of the top 10 U.S. grossing films in its third week of release at No. 13 with $1.7 million (a 68.5% drop). After a theatrical release of 91 days, the final total North American domestic gross of the film was $27.7 million, less than the opening weekend gross of both Hannibal (2001) and Red Dragon (2002) ($58 million and $36.5 million, respectively). It grossed a total of $82.1 million worldwide, and it is the 19th highest-grossing film by The Weinstein Company at the worldwide box office.

== Home media ==
The DVD was released in the United States on 29 May 2007, debuted at No. 1 and sold 480,861 units in the opening weekend, generating revenue of $10,574,133. As of October 2026, the film has grossed $24,317,170 from DVD sales alone. Blu-ray sales or DVD rentals are not included.

The DVD extras include an unrated version of the film, audio commentary by director Peter Webber and producer Martha De Laurentiis, five deleted scenes with optional commentary from the director, promo spots, and a 16-minute featurette titled "Hannibal Lecter: The Origin Of Evil", featuring interviews with the cast and crew and behind-the-scenes footage.

The film debuted on Blu-ray for the first time on August 20, 2024 in a Walmart-exclusive steelbook packaging. The disc contains a digital copy, all of the extras found on the DVD, and the Unrated cut of the film.
