= Pavel Bezdek =

Czech actor and stunt performer

Pavel Bezdek (born 1965) is a Czech actor and stunt performer. He has had minor roles in a handful of well-known action movies, as well as being a stunt coordinator in others. He usually takes work for sequences filmed at sets in Prague, a popular filming location. Bezdek is also currently a member of the Czech-based Filmka stunt team.

== Notable roles ==
=== As actor ===
- Kamarád do deste II - Príbeh z Brooklynu (1992)
- Escape Velocity (1999) - Lars (escaped con)
- Deadly Engagement (2002) - Gate Guard
- The League of Extraordinary Gentlemen (2003) - Marksman #1
- Alien vs. Predator (2004) - Bass
- Hannibal Rising (2007) - Dieter
- Czech-Made Man (2011) - Stamgast
- Mission: Impossible – Ghost Protocol (2011) - Prison Guard
- Vsivaci (2014)
- Last Knights (2015) - Goon (uncredited)
- Gangster Ka (2015) - Únosce
- Celebrity S.R.O. (2015) - Sergej
- Strasidla (2016) - Mastný

=== As stunt performer ===
- Black Hawk Down (2001)
- Frank Herbert's Dune (2000)
- Frank Herbert's Children of Dune (2003)
- Hellboy (2004)
- Van Helsing (2004)
