= Escape Velocity (film) =

- Directed by: Lloyd A. Simandl
- Written by: Paul A. Birkett (story); Mike Rohl
- Produced by: Lloyd A. Simandl
- Starring: Wendy Crewson; Patrick Bergin; Peter Outerbridge
- Cinematography: Vladimír Kolár
- Edited by: Derek Whelan
- Music by: Peter Allen
- Distributed by: York Entertainment; North American Releasing
- Release date: 28 November 1999 (U.S.)
- Running time: 100 minutes
- Countries: Czech Republic; Canada
- Language: English

Escape Velocity is a 1999 Canadian thriller film, directed by Lloyd A. Simandl.

== Premise ==
A psychotic escaped prisoner takes over a deep-space observatory crewed by a scientist, his wife and teenager daughter.

== Cast ==
- Wendy Crewson as Billie, Ronnie's Mom
- Peter Outerbridge as Lee Nash / Carter
- Patrick Bergin as Cal, Ronnie's Dad and Captain of The Harbinger Spaceship
- Patrik Stanek as Jansen, Escaped Convict
- Michelle Beaudoin as Veronica "Ronnie"
- Pavel Bezdek as Lars, Escaped Convict
- Emil Linka as Glenn, Escaped Convict
- Gerard Whelan as Liam, Escaped Convict
- Robert Russell as Mesa Verde Prison Warden
- Mike McGuffie as Mesa Verde Prison Executioner
- David Nykl as Father Russell
