= Ted Tally =

American playwright and screenwriter (born 1952)

Ted Tally (born April 9, 1952) is an American playwright and screenwriter. He adapted the Thomas Harris novel The Silence of the Lambs into the film of the same name, for which he received the Academy Award for Best Adapted Screenplay, the Writers Guild of America Award, the Chicago Film Critics Award, and the Edgar Award from the Mystery Writers of America.

== Career ==
=== Screenwriter ===
Born William Theodore Tally in North Carolina, Tally was educated at Yale College and the Yale School of Drama, and has also taught at each of them. His most notable credit is the screenplay for The Silence of the Lambs, which won him the Academy Award for Best Adapted Screenplay as well as the Writers Guild of America Award, Chicago Film Critics Award and an Edgar Award from the Mystery Writers of America. Other scripts include White Palace, Before and After, The Juror, All the Pretty Horses, and 12 Strong.

After declining to write the screenplay for Hannibal, Tally returned to the franchise to write Red Dragon. When asked by Inside Film Online why he opted not to write the screenplay for Hannibal, he responded, "For a lot of reasons. I didn't like the book. The director, Jonathan Demme, and I read it and were horrified. We didn't see how we could make a movie from it that we could be proud of and not feel sleazy about it, without making it a totally different story, which we could have done on our own. It was upsetting because we had a friendship with Tom Harris and felt we owed him a lot. But he was defensive and didn't want anything changed and it was frustrating because it would have been the biggest payday for all of us, putting us up there in Spielberg territory."

=== Plays and awards ===
Terra Nova was given a staged reading at the Eugene O'Neill Theater Center and staged at the Yale Repertory Theatre in 1977 and went on to win an Obie Award. It was then given a full production in 1980 at Chichester Festival Theatre as one of the four productions in the 1980 Festival season. Coming Attractions won the Outer Critics Circle Award. Tally's plays include Hooters, Little Footsteps, and Silver Linings. His television scripts include The Comedy Zone, Hooters, Terra Nova for BBC, and The Father Clements Story, which won him the Christopher Award. His other honors include fellowships from the NEA and the Guggenheim Foundation.

=== Other activities ===
Tally is also credited as an associate producer for Mission to Mars (2000), as well as story consultant for Shrek 2 (2004) and creative consultant for Madagascar (2005) and Shrek the Third (2007).

== Filmography ==
=== Screenwriter ===
- The Father Clements Story (1987)
- White Palace (1990)
- The Silence of the Lambs (1991)
- The Juror (1996)
- Before and After (1996)
- All the Pretty Horses (2000)
- Red Dragon (2002)
- 12 Strong (2018)

=== Other ===
- Mission to Mars (2000)
- Shrek 2 (2004)
- Madagascar (2005)
- Shrek the Third (2007)
