= Buffalo Bill (The Silence of the Lambs) =

Fictional character from The Silence of the Lambs

- Hannibal Lecter character
- Ted Levine as Buffalo Bill in The Silence of the Lambs.
- First appearance: The Silence of the Lambs
- Created by: Thomas Harris
- Based on: Ed Gein; Ted Bundy; Gary M. Heidnik
- Adapted by: Ted Tally (The Silence of the Lambs); Jenny Lumet; Alex Kurtzman (Clarice); Gina Gionfriddo (The Silence of the Lambs play)
- Portrayed by: Ted Levine (The Silence of the Lambs); Simon Northwood (Clarice); Sam Jackson (The Silence of the Lambs play)

In-universe information
- Full name: Jame Gumb
- Aliases: John Grant; Jack Gordon
- Nicknames: Billy Rubin; Louis Friend
- Gender: Male
- Occupation: Serial killer Tailor
- Nationality: American

Jame Gumb, known by the nickname "Buffalo Bill", is a fictional character and the main antagonist of Thomas Harris's 1988 novel The Silence of the Lambs and its 1991 film adaptation, in which he is played by Ted Levine. In the film and the novel, he is a serial killer who lures, kidnaps, and skins women for the purpose of making a "woman suit" to fulfill his desire of female transformation. In the television series Clarice, he is portrayed by Simon Northwood.

== Overview ==
=== Background ===
Jame Gumb was born in California on October 25, 1949. It is stated that the unusual spelling of his name is due to a clerical error on his birth certificate "that no one bothered to correct". Gumb's mother, an aspiring actress, went into an alcoholic decline after her career failed to materialize, and Gumb was placed in a foster home when he was two. The novel goes on to tell of Gumb living in foster homes until age 10, when he is adopted by his grandparents, who become his first victims when he impulsively kills them two years later. Gumb is institutionalized in Tulare Vocational Rehabilitation, a psychiatric hospital, where he learns to be a tailor. Later, Gumb has a relationship with Benjamin Raspail. After Raspail leaves him, Gumb kills Raspail's new lover, Klaus, and flays him.

The screenplay omits Gumb's backstory but does imply that he had a traumatic childhood. In the film, Hannibal Lecter summarizes Gumb's life thus: "Our Billy wasn't born a criminal, Clarice. He was made one through years of systematic abuse."

Both the novel and film depict Gumb as hating his own identity, though multiple characters state that Gumb is not transsexual. In the novel, multiple examples of how Gumb does not fit the psychological profile of a real transsexual are given. Gumb wants to become a woman—or at least believes he does—but repeatedly fails to qualify for gender reassignment surgery. He kills women so he can skin them and create a "woman suit" for himself, completing his "transformation". He thinks of his victims as things rather than people, often calling them "it". The only living things he feels real affection for are his dog, Precious, and the many death's-head hawkmoths he raises.

=== Modus operandi ===
Gumb's modus operandi is to approach a woman while pretending to be injured, ask for help, then knock her out in a surprise attack and kidnap her. He takes her to his house and leaves her in a well in his basement, where he starves her until her skin is loose enough to easily remove. In the first two cases, he leads the victims upstairs, slips nooses around their necks and pushes them from the stairs, strangling them. He then skins a different part of each victim's body, and then dumps each body into a different river, destroying any trace of evidence.

This MO caused the homicide squad to nickname him Buffalo Bill (Buffalo Bill's Wild West show typically claimed that Buffalo Bill Cody had scalped a Cheyenne warrior). One officer quipped it was because he "skins his humps". He also inserts a death's-head hawkmoth into the victim's throat because he is fascinated by the insect's metamorphosis, a process that he wants to undergo by becoming a woman. In the case of Gumb's first victim, Fredrica Bimmel, he weighs down her body, so she ends up being the third victim found. In the case of the fourth victim, he shoots rather than strangles her.

At the start of the novel, Gumb has already murdered five women. Behavioral Science Unit Chief Jack Crawford assigns gifted trainee Clarice Starling to question incarcerated serial killer Hannibal Lecter about the case; Lecter had met Gumb while treating Raspail. When Gumb kidnaps Catherine Martin, the daughter of U.S. Senator Ruth Martin, Lecter offers to give Starling a psychological profile of the killer in return for a transfer to a federal institution; this profile is mostly made up of cryptic clues designed to help Starling figure it out for herself. Starling eventually deduces from Lecter's riddles that Gumb knew his first victim, Frederica Bimmel, and goes to Bimmel's hometown of Belvedere, Ohio to gather information. By this time, Crawford has already found out the killer's true identity and gone with a SWAT team to his house to arrest him, but they find that it is only a business address. Meanwhile, Starling goes to the home of Bimmel's employer, Mrs. Lippman, only to find Gumb – calling himself "Jack Gordon" – living there. Gumb had murdered Mrs. Lippman earlier.

When Starling sees a moth flutter by, she realizes she has found the killer and orders him to surrender. Gumb flees into the basement, switches off the lights then stalks her with a revolver and night vision goggles. Just as he is about to shoot Starling, she hears him behind her, turns around and opens fire, killing him. In the novel, he addresses his final words to her, asking her, "How does it feel to be so beautiful?" before choking to death on his own blood.

== Influences ==
Harris based various elements of Gumb's MO on three real-life serial killers:

- Ed Gein, who fashioned trophies and keepsakes from the bones and skin of corpses he dug up at cemeteries, as well as from two women that he murdered. He also made a female "skin suit," primarily made of scalps, leggings, and a "mammary" vest made from an upper torso.
- Ted Bundy, who pretended to be injured using an arm-brace or crutches as a ploy to ask his victims for help. When they helped him, he incapacitated and killed them.
- Gary M. Heidnik, who kidnapped, raped and tortured six women while holding them prisoner in a pit, where two died.

== Analysis ==
Marjorie Garber, author of Vested Interests: Cross-Dressing and Cultural Anxiety, asserts that despite the book and the film indicating that Buffalo Bill merely believes himself to be transsexual, they still imply negative connotations about transsexual identity. Garber says, "Harris's book manifests its cultural anxiety through a kind of baroque bravado of plot," and calls the book "a fable of gender dysphoria gone spectacularly awry".

Barbara Creed, writing in Screening the Male: Exploring Masculinities in the Hollywood Cinema, says that Buffalo Bill wants to become a woman "presumably because he sees femininity as a more desirable state, possibly a superior one". For Buffalo Bill, the woman is a "totem animal". Not only does he want to wear women's skin, he wants to become a woman; he dresses in women's clothes and tucks his penis behind his legs to appear female. Creed writes, "To experience a rebirth as woman, Buffalo Bill must wear the skin of woman not just to experience a physical transformation but also to acquire the power of transformation associated with woman's ability to give birth." Buffalo Bill wears the skin of his totem animal to assume its power.

Jack Halberstam, author of Skin Shows: Gothic Horror and the Technology of Monsters, writes, "The cause for Buffalo Bill's extreme violence against women lies not in his gender confusion or his sexual orientation but in his humanist presumption that his sex and his gender and his orientation must all match up to a mythic norm of white heterosexual masculinity." Halberstam says Buffalo Bill symbolizes a lack of ease with one's skin. He writes that the character is also a combination of Victor Frankenstein and his monster in how he is the creator gathering body parts and experimenting with his own body. Halberstam writes, "He does not understand gender as inherent, innate; he reads it only as a surface effect, a representation, an external attribute engineered into identity." Buffalo Bill challenges "the interiority of gender" by taking skin and remaking it into a costume.

The Matrix director Lilly Wachowski, upon coming out as transgender to the Windy City Times in March 2016, singled out The Silence of the Lambs for "demonizing and vilifying" the transgender community in media through Buffalo Bill, alleging that Bill has served as a reference for anti-transgender attack ads portraying trans people as potential predators that target women's bathrooms. "We are not predators, we are prey," Wachowski said.

Bill's character and the claims that Bill is "not really transsexual" have been criticized as transphobic. While being "one of the most significant and impactful examples of pop culture transmisogyny" it allegedly "encourages disbelief of trans people's self-identification".
