= Clarice (TV series) =

2021 American horror television series

- Genre: Psychological horror; Crime drama; Police procedural
- Created by: Jenny Lumet; Alex Kurtzman
- Based on: The Silence of the Lambs by Thomas Harris
- Starring: Rebecca Breeds; Michael Cudlitz; Lucca De Oliveira; Kal Penn; Nick Sandow; Devyn A. Tyler; Marnee Carpenter
- Composer: Jeff Russo
- Country of origin: United States
- Original language: English
- No. of seasons: 1
- No. of episodes: 13

Production
- Executive producers: Elizabeth J.B. Klaviter; Heather Kadin; Jenny Lumet; Alex Kurtzman
- Producer: Paula Devonshire
- Production locations: Toronto, Ontario, Canada
- Cinematography: Glen Keenan
- Editor: Jon Dudkowski
- Running time: 42–43 minutes
- Production companies: Secret Hideout; Tiny Core of Rage Entertainment; The Elizabeth Diaries; CBS Studios; MGM Television

Original release
- Network: CBS
- Release: February 11 – June 24, 2021

Clarice is a 2021 American horror crime drama television series created by Alex Kurtzman and Jenny Lumet. It is based on the 1988 novel The Silence of the Lambs by Thomas Harris and set between the events of its 1991 film adaptation and Hannibal (2001). The series stars Rebecca Breeds as the titular character, along with Lucca De Oliveira, Devyn A. Tyler, Kal Penn, Nick Sandow, Michael Cudlitz, and Marnee Carpenter. The series premiered on February 11, 2021, on CBS.

In May 2021, CBS entered negotiations to relocate the series to Paramount+ for its second season. By June, the relocation became "unlikely" to happen.

== Cast ==
=== Main ===
- Rebecca Breeds as Clarice Starling
- Michael Cudlitz as Paul Krendler
- Lucca De Oliveira as Tomas Esquivel
- Kal Penn as Shaan Tripathi
- Nick Sandow as Murray Clarke
- Devyn A. Tyler as Ardelia Mapp
- Marnee Carpenter as Catherine Martin

=== Recurring ===
- Shawn Doyle as Clarice's original therapist
- Jayne Atkinson as U.S. Attorney General Ruth Martin
- K. C. Collins as Agent Garrett
- Tim Guinee as Novak
- Peter McRobbie as Nils Hagen
- Douglas Smith as Tyson Conway
- Simon Northwood as Jame "Buffalo Bill" Gumb
- Elizabeth Saunders as Bea Love

== Episodes ==
No.	Title	Directed by	Written by	Original release date	U.S. viewers (millions)
1	"The Silence Is Over"	Maja Vrvilo	Jenny Lumet & Alex Kurtzman	February 11, 2021	4.00
Trainee FBI Special Agent Clarice Starling has been placed on administrative leave with federally-mandated therapy sessions following her harrowing ordeal at the hands of the notorious serial killer Buffalo Bill, though Starling refuses to acknowledge herself as one of his victims. Her concurrent association with the incarcerated cannibalistic serial killer/forensic psychiatrist Dr. Hannibal Lecter, who helped her find Bill before using her to escape imprisonment, has poisoned her reputation at the FBI and her relationships with her fellow agents. United States Attorney General Ruth Martin, the mother of the only girl Starling was able to save from Bill, assigns Starling to her new VICAP task force, a team dedicated to hunting down murderers, serial killers and sexual predators despite Starling's reservations. She is given a cold welcome by the task force commander Paul Krendler, whom she had previously outmaneuvered and shown up in finding Buffalo Bill and who is dismissive of her methods and public stardom. VICAP's first case involves two bodies washed up in the Anacostia river with the hallmarks of a serial killer, but Starling is not convinced. The FBI investigates and are led to a sinister conspiracy involving drug trials and parents with children with special needs though Krendler maintains belief in a serial killer. Ultimately Clarice disregards orders and declares before the news cameras that the murders were not due to a serial killer.
2	"Ghosts of Highway 20"	Doug Aarniokoski	Elizabeth J. B. Klaviter & Kenneth Lin	February 18, 2021	4.08
Clarice Starling and the rest of the FBI's VICAP team are sent to Tennessee, where local and federal law enforcement are in a tense standoff at a heavily armed militia compound. Clarice takes a leading role in the negotiations after she bumps into a young boy who's snuck out of the compound. He alerts the leader of the group, named Novak (Tim Guinee), to Clarice's presence. Novak insists he will negotiate with no one but her. Clarice goes into the compound, wearing a wire, and bonds with Novak over their shared Appalachian upbringing. Clarice excuses herself to the bathroom to pull herself together after he brings up painful memories of her brother. Novak, who spies on her through a one-way mirror, opts to escalate the confrontation. An exchange of gunfire with the agents surrounding the compound ensues, and the local sheriff is brought in to complete the negotiations. Meanwhile, Clarice takes advantage of the confusion to snoop around the compound. She runs into the boy again, and realizes he was the shooter, who pulled the trigger as a cry for help. She also discovers a hidden passage through which Novak can spy on and record the doings of his militia members—specifically the women, whom he chains up and pimps out. The sheriff and many other locals are either on Novak's payroll or customers for his sex trafficking ring. Clarice manages to get Novak to admit to all this on the wire. When he realizes this, he nearly kills her, but Clarice drops down out of the way so her sniper teammate Esquivel can kill the militia leader before he can kill Clarice. Rather than throw the book at the crooked sheriff, Attorney General Martin makes a deal with him: he can spend the next few months firing dirty and abusive cops before resigning himself, or she can blow up his spot and ruin him right then and there.
3	"Are You Alright?"	Doug Aarniokoski	William Harper	February 25, 2021	3.65
4	"You Can't Rule Me"	Chloe Domont	Gabriel Ho & Lydia Teffera	March 4, 2021	3.48
5	"Get Right with God"	Chloe Domont	Tess Leibowitz	March 11, 2021	3.01
Clarice awakens in a ward bed to find she has been chemically paralysed from the waist down and fitted to look like one of the patients. Groggy from a massive dose of sedatives and painkillers, she is confronted by Marilyn Felker who threatens to put her in a chemically induced coma and on a ventilator if she misbehaves; Felker then sedates Clarice again with more painkillers. Ardelia, concerned over Clarice's disappearance, meets with Clarice's teammates to try and find out what happened to her. Meanwhile, Felker continues to inject Starling with huge amounts of sedatives and painkillers, causing a series of vivid hallucinations, to get her to divulge what the FBI know about her and the whereabouts of Rebecca Clarke Sherman, but Starling hits back by psychologically targeting Marilyn's childhood trauma. When Starling pushes too hard, Marilyn injects her with a drug that paralyses Starling's lungs, intubates Starling and puts her on a ventilator. When Starling's team show up at the clinic looking for her, Marilyn reinforces Starling's patient disguise and the team fail to spot her before Marilyn insists they leave. Clarice and Marilyn continue to spar verbally during Starling's bouts of lucidity. Back at the FBI, the team finally makes a connection that enables them to thoroughly search the clinic and assemble a strike team. Starling manages to overcome the drugs in her system and makes her escape by forcing Marilyn to save her comatose sister from a drug-induced heart attack. The FBI arrive and rescue Starling and the sister but fail to stop Marilyn from committing suicide via a fatal drug overdose. Starling is reunited with Ardelia but is deeply traumatised by her ordeal.
6	"How Does It Feel to Be So Beautiful"	Wendey Stanzler	Kenneth Lin & Celena Cipriaso	April 1, 2021	2.37
Clarice undergoes hypnosis in an attempt to remember the man she saw with Marilyn Felker during her attempt to escape from captivity, but her memories are intermixed with those of her confrontation with Buffalo Bill. Krendler places her on enforced leave to recover from the ordeal, but Clarice is determined to identify her attacker and goes to see Attorney General Martin to ask her to overrule Krendler. Martin agrees on the condition that Starling join her and Catherine for dinner. Ardelia sends DNA samples from Clarice's fingernail for analysis, but the results are inconclusive. Not satisfied with the outcome, Ardelia retrieves the sample and finds the result was faked. Krendler meets with a lawyer who offers to represent him in his divorce case—he becomes determined to seek full custody after his son pages him and he finds his wife passed out from drinking. Over dinner, Clarice is alarmed when Catherine tells her she has tracked down Buffalo Bill's mother. Catherine also says that after Clarice shot Bill, Clarice cried for ages before calling for help, which Clarice does not remember. Clarice goes under hypnosis again, and finds that Catherine was right—with her memory clear of the Buffalo Bill trauma, she recalls the face of the man with Felker—Krendler's new divorce lawyer.
7	"Ugly Truth"	Wendey Stanzler	William Harper	April 8, 2021	2.57
Clarice and Ardelia team up to investigate a deeply twisted cold case after the body of a missing teenager is found entombed in concrete; Clarice wrestles with the knowledge that Krendler may know the man who attacked her while she was held captive.
8	"Add-a-Bead"	Deborah Kampmeier	Boo Killebrew	May 6, 2021	2.54
9	"Silence Is Purgatory"	Deborah Kampmeier	Eleanor Jean	May 13, 2021	2.26
10	"Motherless Child"	Chris Byrne	William Harper	June 3, 2021	1.89
Catherine Martin escapes to Carneys Point, N.J., to confront Buffalo Bill's mother, Lila Gumb; Clarice volunteers to be the one to find Catherine before she commits a vile act and becomes a monster herself.
11	"Achilles Heel"	Chris Byrne	Elizabeth Klaviter & Lydia Teffera	June 10, 2021	1.85
Clarice zeroes in on the entity behind the River Murders, Alastor Pharmaceuticals; the team rushes to Alastor to prevent the purging of any incriminating evidence; Clarice questions the CEO of Alastor Pharmaceuticals.
12	"Father Time"	DeMane Davis	Kenneth Lin	June 17, 2021	2.19
As the team finally gets the green light to raid Alastor Pharmaceuticals, Clarice punches another FBI agent in a moment of rage, then willingly turns in her badge and gun.
13	"Family Is Freedom"	DeMane Davis	Jenny Lumet & Alex Kurtzman	June 24, 2021	1.99
On the heels of ViCAP uncovering Alastor's secrets, Clarice is imprisoned in an animal testing facility where she finds trafficked women being held captive. ViCAP and Ardelia team up to locate Clarice as she attempts to break from her captors in a race to rescue the other women.

== Production ==
=== Development ===
In January 2020, CBS Studios hired Alex Kurtzman and Jenny Lumet to create a sequel series to the 1991 film The Silence of the Lambs.

The series was among the 14 pilot episodes ordered by CBS in February and was fast-tracked to series the following March, as CBS was shut down and unable to film pilot episodes because of the COVID-19 pandemic. CBS picked up the series on May 8 and announced in December a premiere of February 11, 2021, alongside a trailer release. Due to complicated rights issues of franchise characters between Metro-Goldwyn-Mayer and the Dino de Laurentiis Company, the series cannot feature or make reference to Hannibal Lecter. Kurtzman explained, "I'm still trying to understand how the rights are divided. But it's been quite liberating because we have no interest in writing about Hannibal—not because we didn't love the films and the show, but because it was done so well by so many people that it didn't feel fresh for us."

In May 2021, CBS entered negotiations to relocate the series to Paramount+ for its second season. By June, the relocation became "unlikely" to happen. Negotiations between ViacomCBS and co-producer MGM "stalemated", and since CBS had already committed to a full slate of shows, there was no space for Clarice to continue on network television. Industry veterans described the state of affairs as "crazy", where a show already with a new season pickup is facing demise and the prospect of putting 300 people out of work, even though it involves a recognizable intellectual property and Kurzman, a top producer. As of 2026, the show has not been officially canceled.

=== Casting ===
Rebecca Breeds was cast as Clarice Starling in February 2020. Lucca De Oliveira and Devyn A. Tyler were cast in starring roles. Kal Penn, Nick Sandow, and Michael Cudlitz joined the main cast. Marnee Carpenter was cast as a series regular while Jayne Atkinson, Shawn Doyle, and Tim Guinee were cast in recurring roles. Douglas Smith joined the cast in a recurring capacity.

=== Filming ===
Principal photography for the series began on September 21, 2020, in Toronto, Ontario, Canada. Filming of the first season concluded on March 23, 2021.

== Reception ==
=== Critical response ===
On Rotten Tomatoes, the series has an approval rating of 37% based on reviews from 43 critics, with an average rating of 6.11/10. The website's critics consensus reads, "Effectively grim, but narratively bland, Clarice is a disturbingly safe procedural that lets down both its talented cast and source material." Metacritic gave the series a weighted average score of 55 out of 100 based on 32 critic reviews, indicating "mixed or average reviews".

=== Ratings ===
Viewership and ratings per episode of Clarice
No.	Title	Air date	Rating (18–49)	Viewers (millions)	DVR (18–49)	DVR viewers (millions)	Total (18–49)	Total viewers (millions)
1	"The Silence Is Over"	February 11, 2021	0.5	4.00	0.6	3.34	1.1	7.35
2	"Ghosts of Highway 20"	February 18, 2021	0.4	4.08	0.6	3.32	1.0	7.40
3	"Are You Alright?"	February 25, 2021	0.4	3.65	0.6	3.37	1.0	7.02
4	"You Can't Rule Me"	March 4, 2021	0.4	3.48	0.5	3.06	0.9	6.54
5	"Get Right with God"	March 11, 2021	0.4	3.01	0.4	2.76	0.8	5.77
6	"How Does It Feel to Be So Beautiful"	April 1, 2021	0.2	2.37	0.3	2.14	0.5	4.51
7	"Ugly Truth"	April 8, 2021	0.3	2.57	0.4	2.71	0.6	5.28
8	"Add-a-Bead"	May 6, 2021	0.3	2.54	0.4	2.45	0.7	4.99
9	"Silence is Purgatory"	May 13, 2021	0.3	2.26	0.3	2.20	0.6	4.46
10	"Motherless Child"	June 3, 2021	0.2	1.89	0.3	2.12	0.5	4.01
11	"Achilles Heel"	June 10, 2021	0.2	1.85	0.2	1.95	0.5	3.80
12	"Father Time"	June 17, 2021	0.3	2.19	0.2	1.76	0.5	3.95
13	"Family is Freedom"	June 24, 2021	0.2	1.99	0.2	1.89	0.5	3.88
