= Hannibal (soundtrack) =

2001 film soundtrack album

Hannibal (Original Motion Picture Soundtrack)

Soundtrack album by Hans Zimmer
- Released: February 6, 2001
- Recorded: 2000–2001
- Studios: AIR Lyndhurst Hall, London; Media Ventures, Santa Monica, California
- Genre: Film score
- Length: 54:13
- Label: Decca
- Producers: Hans Zimmer; Pietro Scalia

Hans Zimmer chronology
The Pledge (2001)	Hannibal (2001)	Invincible (2001)

Hannibal (Original Motion Picture Soundtrack) is the soundtrack album composed and arranged by Hans Zimmer to the 2001 film Hannibal directed by Ridley Scott which is the sequel to The Silence of the Lambs (1991) and based on the 1999 novel by Thomas Harris. The album features 12 tracks which includes a compilation of Zimmer's score and classical compositions. The album was released through Decca Records on February 6, 2001.

== Background and development ==
Hannibal is the third collaboration between Zimmer and Scott, following Black Rain (1989), Thelma & Louise (1991) and Gladiator (2000). Hans Zimmer recalled in an interview that, while he was writing half of the music, Zimmer remembered that he and Scott had actually began working on Hannibal in 1989 before the book was written, and tried to get another film off the ground, which had a different feel to it, but never materialized. While working on Gladiator, he read the original novel and thought that he should make it a romantic comedy, and approach it that way; despite the actual genre being a horror thriller film, Zimmer went ahead with this approach saying "It's the ultimate in romance gone mad".

Zimmer recalled that another composer from his Media Ventures had been reported to score the film, but it did not work out which resulted him doing it by default more than anything. However, Klaus Badelt who worked in Media Ventures had composed one piece titled "Gourmet Valse Tartare". Scott considered that the music to a film is as important as dialogue, describing it the final adjustment to the screenplay that can also adjust the performance of the actors as well. Zimmer and Scott closely worked with editor Pietro Scalia to discuss scenes in the film and not music. Mason Verger had his own theme, which Zimmer stated, that became more "perverted" as the film progressed.

Zimmer stated that in the album, a seven-minute long piece appears only for two minutes in the film and was inspired by Gustav Mahler's music. He noted that the piece was actually written in 1989 for the shelved Hannibal idea, which he rewrote it to let Scott find out the possible section he would like it. He further credited Scott for the idea, which would not have existed without the original conversation dated back in 1989. The piece titled "Vide cor Meum" was inspired by Dante's sonnet which was composed by Patrick Cassidy for the opera scene in Florence. Though not in the soundtrack, Strauss's The Blue Danube is also played at several points in the film, and "Aria da capo" from Bach's Goldberg Variations was also featured.

== Reception ==
Christian Clemmensen of Filmtracks summarized that "The music for Hannibal fares well on its album even with the controversial production choices. The same uneasiness that blesses the story on the screen causes the album to be equally frightful, and yet, in the end, the moments of score and dialogue together steal the album with their often understated elegance." Christopher Coleman of Tracksounds.com summarized that "Zimmer truly crafts a score worthy of most fans' full attention ... the classical elements, and yes, even the monologue combine to make this an intense listening experience."

Sean Wilson of MFiles said, "It's also a score that expertly demonstrates Zimmer's capacity for creativity. In truth, the score is much more interesting and entertaining than Zimmer's louder efforts – the soundscape is more appealing and inviting, the themes more memorable, the music a more effective complement to the visual imagery ... a tremendous work, Hannibal is inarguably one of the best scores of Zimmer's career." In a poll by British Classic FM listeners to find the greatest film soundtrack of all time, Hannibal ranked at No. 59.

== Track listing ==
No.	Title	Artist(s)	Length
1.	"Dear Clarice"		6:02
2.	"Aria da capo" (from Goldberg Variations)	J. S. Bach	1:48
3.	"The Capponi Library"		1:15
4.	"Gourmet Valse Tartare"	Klaus Badelt	6:50
5.	"Avarice"		3:55
6.	"For A Small Stipend"		0:56
7.	"Firenze Di Notte"	Martin Tillman and Mel Wesson	3:09
8.	"Virtue"		4:38
9.	"Let My Home Be My Gallows"		10:01
10.	"The Burning Heart"		4:24
11.	"To Every Captive Soul"		6:55
12.	"Vida Cor Meum"	Patrick Cassidy	4:20
Total length:			54:13

== Chart performance ==
2001 weekly chart performance for Hannibal
Chart (2001)	Peak position
Australian Albums (ARIA)	22
Belgian Albums (Ultratop Flanders)	35
Danish Albums (Hitlisten)	32
Dutch Albums (Album Top 100)	70
French Albums (SNEP)	119
Scottish Albums (OCC)	2
Swiss Albums (Schweizer Hitparade)	66
UK Albums (OCC)	74
UK Physical Albums (OCC)	74
UK Classical Compilation Albums (OCC)	1
US Billboard 200	89
US Top Soundtracks (Billboard)	10
