= Mollie Gallagher =

English actress

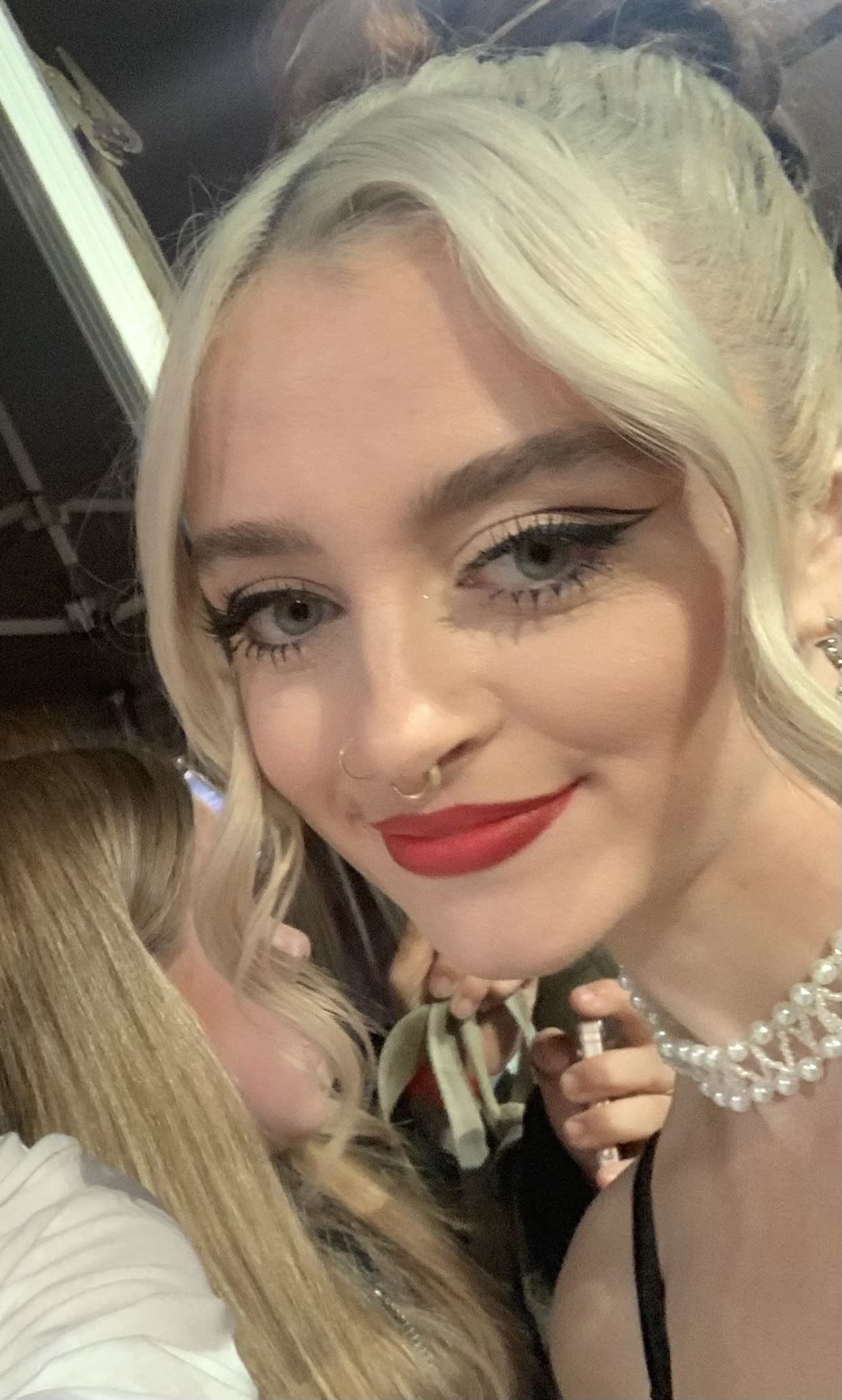
- Gallagher in 2022
- Born: Mollie Elizabeth Gallagher; 11 December 1997 (age 28); Swinton, Salford, England
- Education: Academy of Live and Recorded Arts
- Occupation: Actress
- Years active: 2019–present
- Television: Coronation Street; Dancing on Ice

Mollie Elizabeth Gallagher (born 11 December 1997) is an English actress. She is known for portraying the role of Nina Lucas in the ITV soap opera Coronation Street. For her portrayal of Nina, Gallagher has won several awards including "Best Newcomer" at the Inside Soap Awards and "Serial Drama Performance" at the National Television Awards. In 2023, she competed in the fifteenth series of Dancing on Ice.

== Early life and education ==
Gallagher was born on 11 December 1997 in Swinton, Salford. She studied drama Pendleton College in Salford before moving to London to study at the Academy of Live and Recorded Arts. During her studies, Gallagher worked as a seat filler at the National Television Awards.

== Career ==
After graduating, Gallagher joined the cast of the ITV soap opera Coronation Street as Nina Lucas. Her character was introduced in November 2019 as the long-lost niece of established character Roy Cropper (David Neilson) who eventually ends up living with him following the death of her father. Her storylines on the show have included being injured in a hate crime which resulted in the death of the character's boyfriend Seb Franklin (Harry Visinoni) and later entering a relationship with Asha Alahan (Tanisha Gorey), the former of which won the award for Best Storyline at the 2021 Inside Soap Awards. Gallagher has also won the awards for Serial Drama Performance at the 26th National Television Awards and Best On-Screen Partnership alongside Neilson at the Inside Soap Awards in 2021. In January 2023, Gallagher began competing in the fifteenth series of Dancing on Ice. Her participation in the series was confirmed on Lorraine in October 2022. In 2026, Gallagher left Coronation Street to play FBI-trainee Clarice Starling in a stage adaptation of Thomas Harris' novel The Silence of the Lambs.

== Filmography ==
Year	Title	Role	Notes	Ref(s)
2019–2026	Coronation Street	Nina Lucas	Regular role	
2023	Dancing on Ice	Herself	Contestant; series 15	
2025	I Like This Boy	Daphne	Short film	

== Awards and nominations ==
Year	Award	Category	Result	Ref.
2020	RadioTimes.com Soap Awards	Best Newcomer	Nominated	
2020	Inside Soap Awards	Best Newcomer	Won	
2021	26th National Television Awards	Serial Drama Performance	Won	
2021	Inside Soap Awards	Best Actress	Nominated	
2021	Inside Soap Awards	Best Partnership (with David Neilson)	Won	
2021	I Talk Telly Awards	Best Soap Performance	Nominated	
2021	Digital Spy Reader Awards	Best Actor (Female)	Second	
2022	The British Soap Awards	Best On-Screen Partnership (with Neilson)	Nominated	
2022	Inside Soap Awards	Best Double Act (with Neilson)	Nominated	
