= Hannibal (2001 film) =

2001 film by Ridley Scott

- Theatrical release poster
- Directed by: Ridley Scott
- Screenplay by: David Mamet; Steven Zaillian
- Based on: Hannibal by Thomas Harris
- Produced by: Dino De Laurentiis; Martha De Laurentiis; Ridley Scott
- Starring: Anthony Hopkins; Julianne Moore; Gary Oldman; Ray Liotta; Frankie R. Faison; Giancarlo Giannini; Francesca Neri
- Cinematography: John Mathieson
- Edited by: Pietro Scalia
- Music by: Hans Zimmer
- Production companies: Metro-Goldwyn-Mayer; Universal Pictures; Dino De Laurentiis Company; Scott Free Productions
- Distributed by: MGM Distribution Co. (United States and Canada); United International Pictures (International) (Note: excluding Germany and Austria (Tobis-StudioCanal), Italy (Filmauro), and Japan (GAGA-Humax))
- Release date: 9 February 2001 (United States)
- Running time: 131 minutes
- Country: United States
- Language: English
- Budget: $87 million
- Box office: $351.6 million

Hannibal is a 2001 American thriller film co-produced and directed by Ridley Scott from a screenplay by David Mamet and Steven Zaillian, based on the 1999 novel by Thomas Harris. It is a sequel to The Silence of the Lambs (1991). Its plot follows disgraced FBI special agent Clarice Starling as she attempts to apprehend the cannibalistic serial killer Hannibal Lecter before his surviving victim, Mason Verger, captures him. Anthony Hopkins reprises his role as Lecter, while Julianne Moore replaces Jodie Foster as Starling and Gary Oldman plays Verger. Ray Liotta, Frankie R. Faison, Giancarlo Giannini, and Francesca Neri also star.

Harris published Hannibal eleven years after the publication of The Silence of the Lambs (1988). Scott became attached while directing Gladiator (2000), and signed on after reading the script pitched by Dino De Laurentiis, who had produced Manhunter (1986), the first Lecter film. Principal photography commenced in May 2000, lasting sixteen weeks.

Hannibal was released on 9 February 2001 by MGM Distribution Co. in the United States and Canada and by United International Pictures in other territories. It was highly anticipated and broke box office records in the United States, Australia, Canada and the United Kingdom, and grossed $351.6 million against its $87 million budget, becoming the tenth-highest-grossing film of 2001, but received generally negative reviews; critics praised the performances and visuals, but deemed it inferior to The Silence of the Lambs and criticized its violence. It was followed by a prequel, Red Dragon (2002), with Hopkins reprising his role as Lecter.

== Plot ==
Ten years after the death of serial killer Jame Gumb and the escape of cannibalistic serial killer Hannibal Lecter, (Note: As depicted in The Silence of the Lambs (1991).) FBI Special Agent Clarice Starling is blamed for a botched drug raid that resulted in five deaths.

The event attracts the attention of Mason Verger, Lecter's only surviving victim. A wealthy child molester, Verger was paralyzed and disfigured by Lecter and has been scheming to torture and kill him ever since. Using his wealth and political influence, Verger has Starling reassigned to Lecter's case, hoping her involvement will draw out Lecter from hiding. He is aided by corrupt Justice Department official Paul Krendler, who is upset that Starling refused to sleep with him.

After learning of Starling's disgrace, Lecter sends her a letter; he is hiding in Florence under the false identity of library curator "Dr. Fell." A perfume expert identifies the fragrance on the letter: skin cream with unusual ingredients available in only a few shops. Krendler sexually propositions Starling again, implying that he can save her career, but she rebuffs him.

Florentine policeman Rinaldo Pazzi questions Lecter about the death of Dr. Fell's predecessor. When Starling asks Pazzi for a local fragrance shop's security footage, Pazzi realizes Dr. Fell is Lecter. To claim Verger's $3 million bounty for Lecter, Pazzi agrees to help Verger's men kidnap Lecter without police involvement. However, Lecter subdues Pazzi and forces him to confess. Lecter then disembowels Pazzi and hangs him from the balcony of the Palazzo Vecchio. (Note: A reference to the disemboweling of Judas Iscariot and the 1478 execution of Pazzi's ancestors, incidents that Lecter repeatedly mentions to Pazzi over the course of the film.)

Verger bribes Krendler to frame Starling for hiding evidence against Lecter, leading to her suspension. Lecter summons Starling to Washington Union Station, where he encourages her to quit her job. However, Verger's men trail Starling and capture Lecter. Starling infiltrates Verger's estate, where she learns that Verger intends to feed Lecter alive to a herd of purpose-bred giant forest hogs. She frees Lecter from the boar pen but a guard shoots her. Lecter saves the wounded Starling from being attacked by the boars by picking her up and standing still, as the boars devour the bleeding guards. Verger orders Cordell, his physician, to shoot Lecter, but Lecter offers to take the blame if Cordell kills Verger instead. Cordell, who dislikes Verger, shoves him into the pen, where the boars eat him alive. Lecter carries an unconscious Starling to safety.

Starling awakens in Krendler's home, wearing an unfamiliar cocktail dress. Although Lecter has sedated her and Krendler, she has the presence of mind to call the police. She then finds Lecter preparing an elegant dinner, during which Krendler lobs misogynistic insults at her. He then insults Lecter's cooking. Lecter opens Krendler's skull, removes part of his brain, sautés it, and feeds it to Krendler. Although Lecter hopes to impress Starling by torturing her oppressor, she is horrified and attacks Lecter, but he overpowers and kisses her. She handcuffs their wrists together. Hearing the police arrive, Lecter raises a cleaver over her wrist, seemingly ready to maim her. However, the film cuts to Starling raising her hands, both intact, to meet the police. On a flight, Lecter, his arm in a sling, shares a piece of Krendler's brain with a curious boy, saying it is important to "try new things.”

== Cast ==
- Anthony Hopkins as Dr. Hannibal Lecter / Dr. Fell
- Julianne Moore as FBI Agent Clarice Starling
- Gary Oldman as Mason Verger (Note: Oldman was uncredited in the original theatrical version of the film. His name was added to the closing credits in all subsequent releases.)
- Ray Liotta as Paul Krendler
- Frankie R. Faison as Barney Matthews
- Giancarlo Giannini as Chief Inspector Rinaldo Pazzi
- Francesca Neri as Allegra Pazzi
- Željko Ivanek as Dr. Cordell Doemling
- David Andrews as FBI Agent Clint Pearsall
- Francis Guinan as FBI Assistant Director Noonan
- Robert Rietti as Sogliato
- Enrico Lo Verso as Gnocco
- Ivano Marescotti as Carlo Deogracias
- Fabrizio Gifuni as Fabrizio
- Marco Greco as Tommaso
- Hazelle Goodman as Evelda Drumgo
- Terry Serpico as Officer Bolton
- Boyd Kestner as FBI Agent Burke
- Peter Shaw as FBI Agent John Brigham
- James Opher as DEA Agent Eldridge
- Don McManus as Benny Holcombe
- Danielle de Niese as Beatrice in Vide Cor Meum
- Mark Margolis and Ajay Naidu as Perfume Experts
- Bruce MacVittie as FBI Tech with Lecter's Letter

== Development ==
The Silence of the Lambs, based on the 1988 novel by Thomas Harris, was released in 1991 to critical and commercial success, winning five Academy Awards. Harris spent several years writing a sequel novel; Silence of the Lambs director Jonathan Demme expressed interest in developing a film adaptation when the novel was complete.

The film rights to the Lecter character were owned by producer couple Dino De Laurentiis and Martha De Laurentiis. After producing the first Lecter film, Manhunter, in 1986, they allowed Orion Pictures to produce The Silence of the Lambs free without their involvement. When The Silence of the Lambs became a success, the couple became eager for a new Lecter novel they could adapt. After a lengthy wait, De Laurentiis received a call from Harris telling him he had finished the novel and De Laurentiis purchased the rights for a record $10 million.

In April 1999, the Los Angeles Times reported that the budget for an adaptation of Hannibal could cost as much as $100 million. It speculated that both Jodie Foster and Anthony Hopkins would receive $15 million each to reprise their roles and that Demme would receive $5 million to $19 million. Mort Janklow, Harris's agent at the time, told the Los Angeles Times that Foster, Hopkins, and Demme would soon receive manuscripts of the novel, claiming it would make an unbelievable film. The novel sold out of its initial 1.6 million print run in 1999, and went on to sell millions of copies.

Demme declined the invitation to direct, as he reportedly found the material lurid and too gory. In the 2010 Biography Channel documentary Inside Story: The Silence of the Lambs, Demme said: "Tom Harris, as unpredictable as ever, took Clarice and Dr. Lecter's relationship in a direction that just didn't compute for me. And Clarice is drugged up, and she's eating brains with him, and I just thought, 'I can't do this.'" De Laurentiis said of Demme's decision to decline: "When the pope dies, we create a new pope. Good luck to Jonathan Demme. Good-bye." He later said that Demme felt he could not make a sequel as good as The Silence of the Lambs.

=== Ridley Scott ===
De Laurentiis visited Ridley Scott on the set of Gladiator and suggested he direct Hannibal. Scott, who was conducting principal photography on Gladiator, thought De Laurentiis was speaking about the Carthaginian general and replied: "Dino, I'm doing a Roman epic right now. I don't wanna do elephants coming over the Alps next, old boy."

Scott read the manuscript in four sittings within a week, seeing it as a "symphony", and expressed his desire to direct. He said: "I haven't read anything so fast since The Godfather. It was so rich in all kinds of ways." Scott had reservations with the ending of the novel, in which Lecter and Starling become lovers: "I couldn't take that quantum leap emotionally on behalf of Starling. Certainly, on behalf of Hannibal—I'm sure that's been in the back of his mind for a number of years. But for Starling, no. I think one of the attractions about Starling to Hannibal is what a straight arrow she is." He also did not find the book believable after the opera scene, "which became like a vampire movie". Harris gave Scott permission to change the ending.

=== Writing ===
Ted Tally, screenwriter for The Silence of the Lambs, was another key member of the Silence of the Lambs team to decline involvement. Tally, like Demme, had problems with the novel's "excesses". David Mamet was the first screenwriter to produce a draft, which, according to Scott and the producers, needed major revisions. Stacey Snider, co-chairman of Universal Pictures, said: "There's no way David was going to read 15 pages of our notes and then be available to work on the script day-to-day." A script review at ScreenwritersUtopia.com describes the Mamet draft as "stunningly bad" but found Zaillian's rewrite "gripping entertainment". Scott praised Mamet as fast and efficient, but said he passed on his draft because it needed work and he feared Mamet, who was soon directing his own film, would be too busy to redraft it.

Steven Zaillian, writer of Schindler's List, initially declined to write Hannibal, saying he was busy and that "you can almost never win when you do a sequel". He changed his mind, as "it's hard to say no to Dino once and it's almost impossible to say no to him twice". Scott said there were "very few rewrites once I brought in Steve Zaillian ... If you were to ask who were the best three screenwriters in the business, Steve Zaillian would be one of them. We discussed Hannibal endlessly." One of Zaillian's key objectives was to revise Mamet's script until it pleased all parties, meaning that the "love story" would be told by suggestion instead of by "assault". Scott worked through the script with Zaillian for 28 days, making him "sweat through it with him and discuss every inch of the way with him". After 25 days, Scott realized that Zaillian was "exorcising the 600 pages of the book. He was distilling through discussion what he was gonna finally do ... Frankly I could have just made it."

=== Casting ===
It was unclear if Jodie Foster (Clarice Starling) and Anthony Hopkins (Hannibal Lecter) would reprise their respective roles for which they won Academy Awards in The Silence of the Lambs (Best Actress/Best Actor). Both Hopkins and Foster had expressed interest. It became apparent that the producers and the studio could do without one of the original "stars" and would go on to find a replacement. The withdrawal of both Foster and Hopkins could possibly have been terminal for the project, however. De Laurentiis confirmed this after the film's release: "First and foremost, I knew we had no movie without Anthony Hopkins."

==== Involvement of Jodie Foster ====
Foster told Larry King in 1997 that she "would definitely be part of" a sequel to The Silence of the Lambs. In the same year, she told Entertainment Weekly: "Anthony Hopkins always talks about it. I mean, everybody wants to do it. Every time I see him, it's like: 'When is it going to happen? When is it going to happen?'" De Laurentiis thought Foster would decline once she read the book, and believed the final film was better for it. Hopkins also had doubts Foster would be involved, saying he had a "hunch" she would not be.

Foster confirmed that she had turned down the film in December 1999. This caused problems for Universal and production partner Metro-Goldwyn-Mayer (MGM). "The studio is just back from the holiday and is regrouping based on the news, and has no cohesive game plan at the moment," said Kevin Misher, Universal's President of Production. Misher added that, "It was one of those moments when you sit down and think, 'Can Clarice be looked upon as James Bond for instance? A character who is replaceable?' Or was Jodie Foster Clarice Starling, and the audience will not accept anyone else?" Foster said in December 1999 that the characterization of Starling in Hannibal had "negative attributes" and "betrayed" the original character.

Foster's spokeswoman said she declined because Claire Danes had become available for Foster's film Flora Plum. Entertainment Weekly described the Hannibal project as having become "a bloody mess, hemorrhaging talent and money" despite Hopkins being on board. In 2005, after the film had been released, Foster told Total Film: "The official reason I didn't do Hannibal is I was doing another movie, Flora Plum. So I get to say, in a nice dignified way, that I wasn't available when that movie was being shot ... Clarice meant so much to Jonathan and I, she really did, and I know it sounds kind of strange to say but there was no way that either of us could really trample on her."

==== Julianne Moore as Clarice Starling ====
When it became clear that Foster would skip Hannibal, the production team considered several different actresses, including Cate Blanchett, Angelina Jolie, Gillian Anderson, Hilary Swank, Ashley Judd, Helen Hunt and Julianne Moore. Hopkins asked his agent if he had any "power" over casting. He informed De Laurentiis that he knew Moore, with whom he had worked on Surviving Picasso, and thought her a "terrific actress". Although Hopkins' agent told him he had no contractual influence on casting, Scott thought it correct to discuss who would be Hopkins' "leading lady". Scott said he was "really surprised to find that [he] had five of the top actresses in Hollywood wanting it." In order to star in Hannibal, Moore would decline to play a role in Unbreakable.

Scott said his decision was swayed in favor of Moore: "She is a true chameleon. She can be a lunatic in Magnolia, a vamp in An Ideal Husband, a porn star in Boogie Nights and a romantic in The End of the Affair." "Julianne Moore, once Jodie decided to pass, was always top of my list," said Scott on his female lead. Moore talked about stepping into a role made famous by another actress: "The new Clarice would be very different. Of course people are going to compare my interpretation with that of Jodie Foster's ... but this film is going to be very different."

==== Anthony Hopkins as Hannibal Lecter ====
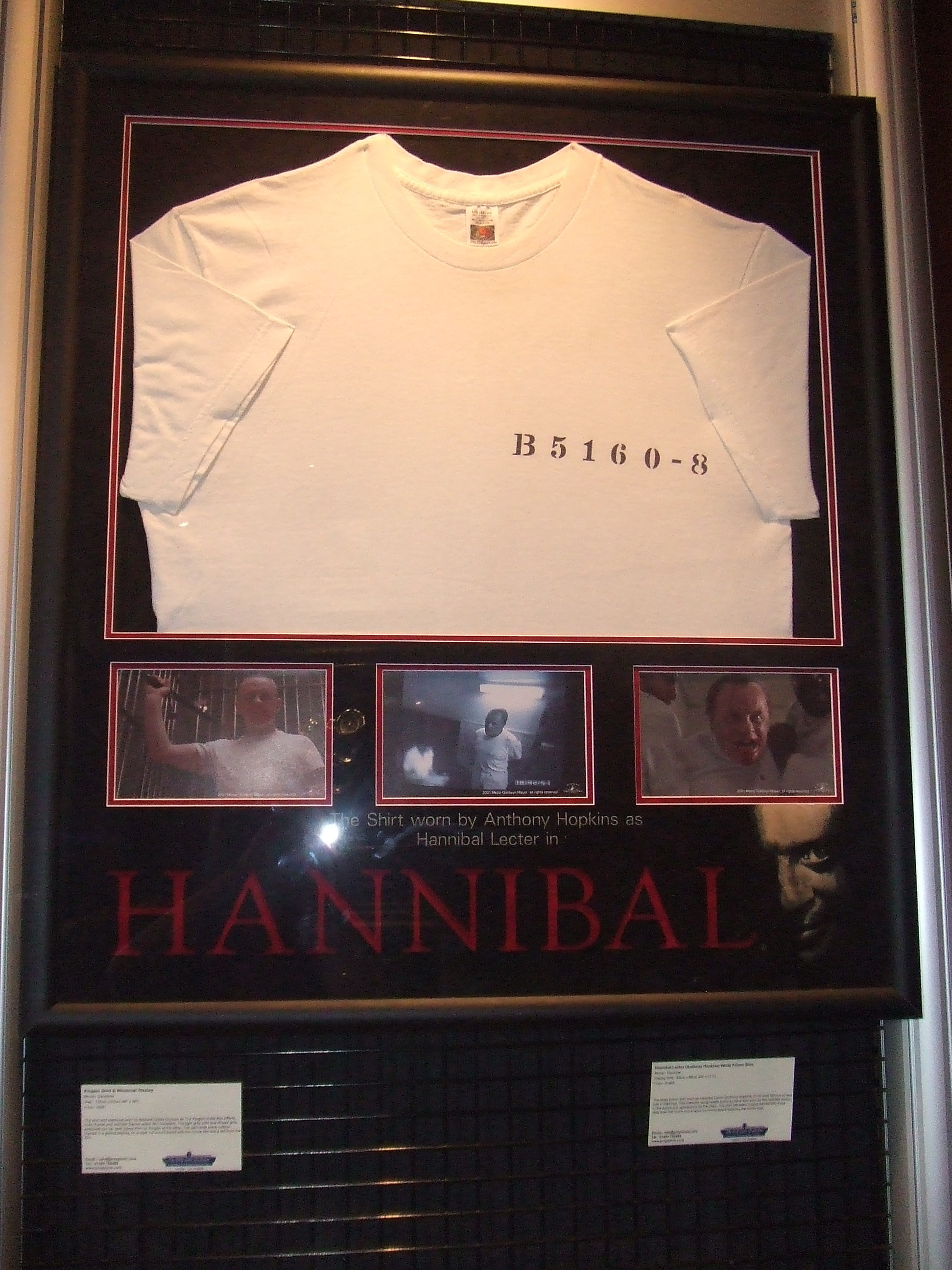
Hannibal Lecter's t-shirt worn by Hopkins in Hannibal on display at the London Film Museum

Hopkins was generally expected to reprise his Academy Award-winning role. Hopkins said in June 1999 that he would only be interested if the script was "really good". Hopkins said he could not make up his mind to commit: "I was kind of surprised by this book, Hannibal. I thought it was really overreaching and so bizarre. So I couldn't make up my mind about it all. Some of it I found intriguing, some I was a little doubtful about." When the producers confirmed that they were going to film Harris' novel, Hopkins told them yes, but added: "It needs some condensing." The Hollywood Reporter confirmed that Hopkins had agreed to reprise his role in late December 1999, saying he had approved the latest draft of the script.

Hopkins said he had no difficulty moving back into "Lecter's mind". "I just learned the lines and showed up and walked around as Hannibal Lecter. I thought, 'Do I repeat that same performance, or do I vary it?' Ten years had passed so I changed a bit." In the book, Lecter uses bandages to disguise himself as a plastic surgery patient. This was left out of the film because Scott and Hopkins agreed to leave the face alone. Hopkins said: "It's as if he's making a statement—'catch me if you can'. With his big hat, he's so obvious that nobody thinks he's Hannibal Lecter. I've always thought he's a very elegant man, a Renaissance man." In the film, Lecter is first seen in Florence "as the classical Lecter, lecturing and being smooth", according to Hopkins. When the film moves to the US, Hopkins changed his appearance by building up muscle and cropping his hair short "to make him like a mercenary, that he would be so fit and so strong that he could just snap somebody in two if they got ... in his way".

==== Gary Oldman as Mason Verger ====
The part of Mason Verger, one of Lecter's two surviving victims, was originally offered to Christopher Reeve based on his work as a police officer who uses a wheelchair in Above Suspicion (1995). Not having read the novel, Reeve showed initial interest in the role, but ultimately declined upon realizing that Verger was a quadriplegic, facially-disfigured child rapist. The part was later accepted by secondary choice Gary Oldman. Co-producer Martha De Laurentiis claimed they had a "funny situation" with Oldman wanting a prominent "credit". She said: "Now how can you have a prominent credit with Hannibal? The characters are Hannibal and Clarice Starling. So we really couldn't work something out (at first)." Oldman was apparently "out" of the film for a while, but then came back in, asking to go "unbilled". Oldman would become transformed and "unrecognizable as himself" to play the part of Verger. He would have no lips, cheeks or eyelids. Make-up artist Greg Cannom said: "It's really disgusting ... I've been showing people pictures [of Oldman as Verger], and they all just say 'Oh my God,' and walk away, which makes me very happy." Oldman said that having his name completely removed from the billing and credits allowed him to "do it anonymously" under the heavy make-up.

==== Further casting ====
Other stars subsequently cast included Ray Liotta as U.S. Justice Department official Paul Krendler (the character had appeared in The Silence of the Lambs, but original actor Ron Vawter had died in the interim) and Italian actor Giancarlo Giannini as Detective Rinaldo Pazzi. Francesca Neri played Pazzi's wife, Allegra. Frankie Faison reprised his role as orderly Barney Matthews, remaining the only actor to play a role in all Lecter feature films (until Hannibal Rising in 2007), including Manhunter.

=== Key production crew ===
Scott recruited the key production crew with whom he had worked previously. Production designer Norris Spencer had worked on Thelma & Louise, Black Rain and 1492: Conquest of Paradise. Cinematographer John Mathieson, editor Pietro Scalia and composer Hans Zimmer had all worked on Scott's previous film Gladiator.

== Production ==
=== Background ===
Hannibal was filmed in 83 working days over 16 weeks. The film began production on 8 May 2000 in Florence, Italy. The film visited key locations in Florence and various locations around the United States. Martha De Laurentiis said the film has almost a hundred locations and that it was a "constant pain of moving and dressing sets. But the locations were beautiful. Who could complain about being allowed to shoot in Palazzo Vecchio in Florence? Or President James Madison's farm in Montpelier or the amazing Biltmore Estate in Asheville?" Eighty million dollars and a year and a half in production were spent before Scott got his first look at Hannibal in the editing room.

=== Filming locations ===
- The whole second act of Hannibal takes place in Florence. Ridley Scott had never filmed there before, but described it as "quite an experience ... It was kind of organized chaos ... We were there at the height of tourist season." Within Florence, the production would visit various locations such as the Palazzo Capponi (as Dr. Fell's workplace), the Ponte Vecchio, the Palazzo Vecchio, the Pharmacy of Santa Maria Novella and the Cathedral.
- After leaving Italy on 5 June 2000, the production moved to Washington, D.C. Filming took place over six days at Washington Union Station. The unusual sight of a carousel appeared in the transportation hub and shopping plaza at Ridley Scott's request.
- Filming lasted for seven weeks in Richmond, Virginia for the shootout in a crowded fish market (shot at Richmond Farmer's Market) early in the film. Julianne Moore underwent FBI training at the Bureau's headquarters before filming.
- A barn in Orange, Virginia, situated on the estate of President James Madison, was used to house 15 "performing hogs". The 15 Russian boars used in the shoot were from a selection of around 6,000 that the animal wranglers observed.
- Biltmore Estate in Asheville, North Carolina, the biggest privately owned estate in the US, was chosen to signify the huge personal wealth of Mason Verger.

=== Special make-up effects ===
Make-up artist Greg Cannom was pleased to be involved in Hannibal as it offered him the chance to produce "incredible and original make-ups". For Mason Verger, the make-up team initially produced 20 different heads which looked like zombies and did not reflect the vision Scott had of the character. Scott wanted Verger to look real with hideous scarring, and not something from the "House of Wax". Scott himself called on the help of expert doctors in an effort to get the look of the character as realistic as possible. Scott showed the make-up team pictures of foetal things, which he thought touching; he wanted to make Mason Verger more touching than monstrous, as he thought of Verger as being someone who hadn't lost his sense of humour, almost sympathetic. Oldman spent six hours a day in make-up to prepare for the role.

For one of the film's final and infamous scenes, an exact duplicate was created of the character Paul Krendler, played by Ray Liotta, a scene which blended make-up, puppet work and CGI in a way which Scott called "seamless".

=== Title sequence ===
The main titles were designed by Nick Livesey, a graduate of the Royal College of Art who worked for one of Scott's production companies in London. The sequence, shot in Florence by Livesey himself, was intended as the film's second promotional trailer. The studio thought it not "quite right", but it remained on Scott's mind and would eventually end up as the main title sequence. Livesey gathered footage of pigeons in an empty square in Florence early one morning which, in the final cut, would morph into the face of Hannibal Lecter. Scott believed it a good idea, as it fundamentally asked the question: 'Where is Hannibal Lecter?' Scott explains: "And of course this story tells it, with pigeons in the cobblestones of somewhere, where you wonder where that is ... and there he is... his face appears." The titles are said to have been influenced by the film Seven.

== Music ==
Ridley Scott worked very closely with composer Hans Zimmer, during post-production on Hannibal. Scott believes the music to a film is as important as dialogue—"It is the final adjustment to the screenplay, being able to also adjust the performance of the actors in fact." Zimmer, and Scott sat in during the editing process with editor Pietro Scalia to discuss scenes in the film and "not music". The film features classical composition, such as Dante's sonnet being put to music by Patrick Cassidy and Strauss's The Blue Danube being used in several instances.

== Themes ==
=== Romance ===
Scott has said he believes the underlying emotion of Hannibal is "affection". "In some instances, you might even wonder or certainly from one direction—is it more than affection? It is dark, because the story is of course essentially dark, but it's kind of romantic at the same time." Scott openly admits to a "romantic thematic" running through the film. He told CNN that: "Hannibal was quite a different target, essentially a study between two individuals. Funny enough, it's rather romantic and also quite humorous, but also there's some quite bad behaviour as well." During the opera scene in Florence, Lecter attends an operatic adaptation of one of Dante's sonnets, and meets with Detective Pazzi and his wife, Allegra. She asks Lecter, "Do you believe a man could become so obsessed by a woman after a single encounter?" Lecter replies: "Yes, I believe he could ... but would she see through the bars of his plight and ache for him?" This scene, in the film, is one which Scott claims most people "missed" the meaning of. It was in reference to Starling—to their encounter in The Silence of the Lambs. The New York Times, in its review of the film, said Hannibal, "toys" with the idea of "love that dare not speak its name".

Composer Hans Zimmer believed there were messages and subtext in each scene. He said, "I can score this movie truly as a Freudian archetypal beauty and the beast fairy tale, as a horror movie, as the most elegant piece, on corruption in the American police force, as the loneliest woman on earth, the beauty in renaissance ..." Zimmer ultimately believes it to be a dark love story, centering on two people who should never be together—a modern-day Romeo and Juliet. During post-production, Scott, Zimmer and the editor passionately argued about the meaning of Starling's tear during a confrontation with Lecter. They could not agree if it was a tear of "anguish", "loneliness" or "disgust". Scott told the New York Post that, the affair of the heart between Lecter and Starling is metaphorical. Rolling Stone magazine said in their review, "Scott offers a sly parody of relationships—think 'When Hannibal met Sally'."

=== Retribution and punishment ===
Scott has said he believed Lecter, in his own way, was "pure", whose motivation is the search for "retribution and punishment". "There is something very moral about Lecter in this film," said Scott in his audio commentary. "The behaviour of Hannibal is never insane—[I] didn't want to use that excuse. Is he insane? No, I think he's as sane as you or I. He just likes it." Scott did say, however, "In our normal terms, he's truly evil." Scott also brings up the notion of absolution in reference to Lecter towards the film's end. Verger has one overriding objective in life: to capture Lecter and subject him to a slow, painful death.

=== Corruption ===
Part of the story involves the character Rinaldo Pazzi (Giancarlo Giannini), a Florentine policeman who learns "Dr. Fell's" true identity and realizes that this knowledge could make him rich. His escalating abandonment of morality allows him to countenance and facilitate the death of a Romani pickpocket, egged on by the desire to have the best for his much younger wife. There is a moment in the film when Pazzi becomes corrupted, despite being what Scott describes as "very thoughtful".

== Release ==
=== Marketing ===
The first trailer appeared in theaters and was made available via the official website in early May 2000, over nine months before the film's release. As the film had only just begun production, footage was used from The Silence of the Lambs. A second trailer, which featured footage from the new film, was released in late November 2000. In marketing the film, Hopkins' portrayal of Hannibal Lecter was chosen as the unique selling point of Hannibal. "Mr Hopkins is the draw here", said Elvis Mitchell in a 2001 The New York Times article. A poster released in the UK to promote Hannibal, featuring Lecter with a "skin mask" covering the right side of his face, was quickly removed from circulation as it was deemed "too shocking and disturbing for the public."

Upon its release, Hannibal was met with significant media attention, with the film's stars and director making several appearances on television, in newspapers and in magazines. In an article for CBS News, Jill Serjeant stated that "the long-awaited sequel to the grisly 1991 thriller Silence of the Lambs is cooking up the hottest Internet and media buzz since the 1999 Star Wars 'prequel'." Stars Anthony Hopkins and Julianne Moore made the covers of a number of magazines, including Vanity Fair, Entertainment Weekly, Premiere, and Empire.

=== Distribution ===
Metro-Goldwyn-Mayer distributed the film in the United States and Canada, and Universal Pictures handled international distribution through United International Pictures, with Universal Pictures International (UPI) handling sales in selected territories, with the exception of Germany, Italy and Japan. Dino De Laurentiis Company retained the film through close deals, such as Tobis StudioCanal for Germany, Filmauro for Italy and GAGA Communications for Japan.

=== Home media ===
Hannibal was released on VHS and DVD on August 21, 2001, and on Blu-ray on September 15, 2009. A new transfer of the film was released on Blu-ray and Ultra HD Blu-ray by Kino Lorber on May 7, 2019.

== Reception ==
=== Box office ===
Hannibal grossed $58 million (U.S.) in its opening weekend from 3,230 screens. At the time, this was the third-biggest debut ever behind 1997's The Lost World: Jurassic Park and 1999's Star Wars: Episode I – The Phantom Menace. It went on to surpass Scream 3 to have the highest debut in February. That record was surpassed by The Passion of the Christ in 2004. The film also had the largest opening weekend for an R-rated film, beating Scary Movie. Hannibal would hold this record for two years until it was taken by The Matrix Reloaded in 2003. Furthermore, it managed to beat out the Special Edition release of Star Wars to have the highest winter opening weekend. Final domestic box office gross (U.S.) reached $165,092,268, with a worldwide gross of $351,692,268. The film spent three weeks at number one in the U.S. box office chart, and four weeks at number one in the UK, and was the year's third highest-grossing film in that country behind Lara Croft: Tomb Raider and Harry Potter and the Philosopher's Stone. In Italy, it grossed $4.6 million in its opening weekend, setting a record for a US release, beating The Blair Witch Project. It also set a record opening week in the Netherlands with $1.3 million in six days, beating Independence Day. It also had the second biggest opening in Spain with $4.1 million in 6 days. Hannibal was the tenth highest-grossing film of the year worldwide. Hannibal also made over $87,000,000 in U.S. video rentals following release in August 2001.

=== Critical response ===
Reviews for Hannibal were mixed. On Rotten Tomatoes, it holds an approval rating of 39% based on 175 reviews. The website's critical consensus reads, "While superbly acted and stylishly filmed, Hannibal lacks the character interaction between the two leads which made the first movie so engrossing." On Metacritic, the film has a rating of 57 out of 100 from 36 reviews, indicating "mixed or average" reviews. Audiences surveyed by CinemaScore gave the film a grade "C+" on scale of A to F.

Time magazine wrote: "A banquet of creepy, gory or grotesque incidents is on display in Hannibal. But this superior sequel has romance in its dark heart." Empire magazine gave it two out of five stars, calling it "laughable to just plain boring, Hannibal is toothless to the end." David Thomson, writing in the British Film Institute magazine Sight & Sound, praised the film. "It works. It's smart, good-looking, sexy, fun ... dirty, naughty and knowing." Thomson does make clear he is a great fan of director Ridley Scott's work. He adds: "It is, literally, that Hannibal Lecter has become such a household joke that he can't be dreadful again. It seems clear that Anthony Hopkins and Scott saw that, and planned accordingly. That's how the movie was saved." Variety magazine in its review said "Hannibal is not as good as Lambs ... ultimately more shallow and crass at its heart than its predecessor, Hannibal is nevertheless tantalizing, engrossing and occasionally startling."

A negative review in The Guardian claimed that what was wrong with the film was carried over from the book: "The result is an inflated, good-looking bore of a movie. The Silence of the Lambs was a marvelous thing. This, by contrast, is barely okey-dokey." Roger Ebert gave the film 2.5 stars out of 4, and described Hannibal as "a carnival geek show elevated in the direction of art. It never quite gets there, but it tries with every fiber of its craft to redeem its pulp origins, and we must give it credit for the courage of its depravity," and although he was "left with admiration for Scott's craft in pulling [it] off at all, and making it watchable", and praised the Mason Verger character as "a superb joining of skill and diabolical imagination," as well as Hopkins' performance as Lecter, which he described as "fascinating every second he is on the screen," he concluded, "I cannot approve of the movie, not because of its violence, which belongs to the Grand Guignol tradition, but because the underlying story lacks the fascination of Silence of the Lambs."

== Differences from the novel ==
According to Variety magazine, the script for Hannibal was: "quite faithful to the Harris blueprint; fans of the tome may regret the perhaps necessary excision of some characters, most notably Mason Verger's muscle-bound macho sister Margot, as well as the considerable fascinating academic detail, but will basically feel the book has been respected (yes, even the climactic dinner party is served up almost intact, with the only surprise twists saved for its wake)." Time Out noted: "The weight-watchers script sensibly dispenses with several characters to serve a brew that's enjoyably spicy but low on substance. So much story is squeezed into 131 minutes that little time's left for analysis or characterization." Producer Dino De Laurentiis was asked why some characters, notably Jack Crawford, were left out of the film: "I think if you get a book which is 600 pages, you have to reduce it to a script of 100 pages. In two hours of film, you cannot possibly include all the characters. We set ourselves a limit, and cut characters which weren't so vital."

In the book, Mason Verger runs an orphanage, from which he calls children to verbally abuse as a substitute for his no longer being able to molest them. He also has a sister, Margot, whom he had raped when they were children and who is a lesbian. When she disclosed her sexual orientation to her family, their father disowned her. As she is sterile due to steroid abuse, Verger exerts some control over her by promising her a semen sample with which to impregnate her lover, who could then inherit the Verger fortune. At the book's end, Margot and Starling both help Lecter escape during a shootout between Starling and Verger's guards. Margot, at Lecter's advice, stimulates her brother to ejaculate with a rectally inserted cattle prod, and then kills him by ramming his pet moray eel down his throat.

The book's controversial ending has Lecter presenting Starling with the exhumed bones of her father, which he "brings to life" by hypnotizing Starling, allowing her to say goodbye. This forges an odd alliance between Starling and Lecter, culminating in their becoming lovers and escaping to Argentina. At the novel's end, Barney sees them at the Teatro Colón of Buenos Aires.

Also gone from the film are the flashbacks to Lecter's childhood, in which he sees his younger sister, Mischa, eaten by German deserters in 1944. These flashbacks formed the basis for the 2007 film Hannibal Rising (written concurrently with the 2006 novel of the same name) which portrays Lecter as a young man.

Hopkins was asked in an interview on the subject of whether or not he believed the idea of Starling and Lecter heading off into the sunset as lovers (as happens in the book). "Yes, I did. Other people found that preposterous. I suppose there's a moral issue there. I think it would have been a very interesting thing though. I think it would have been very interesting had she gone off, because I suspected that there was that romance, attachment there, that obsession with her. I guessed that a long time ago, at the last phone call to Clarice, at the end of SotL, she said, 'Dr. Lecter, Dr. Lecter ... '."

== Other media ==
=== Prequels ===
The film was followed by two films which are prequels based on novels by Thomas Harris (although the novel of Red Dragon isn't itself a prequel as it was written before Hannibal), and a television series:

- Red Dragon (2002)
- Hannibal Rising (2007)
- Clarice (2021)

=== Video game ===
A video game based on the film was in development at Arxel Tribe. It was supposed to be a first-person action-adventure using the LithTech Jupiter game engine. It was set to be released in 2003, then in 2004 but it was eventually cancelled.

=== In popular culture ===
In 2013, there was a news story from Italy where a gangster fed his rival alive to pigs. Many media stories compared this to a similar scene in Hannibal.

Five months after the film's release, the renowned South Park episode Scott Tenorman Must Die featured Eric Cartman attempting to train a pony to bite his titular rival Scott Tenorman, directly citing "the deformed guy" from Hannibal for such a scheme.

== See also ==
- Cannibalism in popular culture
