= Belvedere, Ohio =

- Unincorporated community
- Location within Ohio
- Coordinates: 40°21′28″N 80°45′54″W
- Country: United States
- State: Ohio
- Counties: Jefferson
- Elevation: 1,043 ft (318 m)
- Time zone: UTC-5 (Eastern (EST))
  - Summer (DST): UTC-4 (EDT)
- ZIP code: 43910
- Area code: 740
- GNIS feature ID: 1048518

Belvedere is an unincorporated community in Wayne Township, Jefferson County, Ohio, United States. It is located between Bloomingdale and Wintersville along U.S. Route 22 at its intersection with "Old U.S. Route 22" (County Route 22A).
