= Marnee Carpenter =

American actress

- Born: 30 July 1990 (age 36); Warwick, Rhode Island, U.S.A.
- Occupation: Actress
- Years active: 2016–present

Marnee Carpenter (born July 30) is an American actress. She was raised in Warwick, Rhode Island, and currently resides in Los Angeles, California. She majored in theater arts at the University of Miami and studied acting at the Upright Citizens Brigade Theatre in Manhattan.

== Career ==
Carpenter's credits include the television series Criminal Minds and Good Girls (2018), the indie film Wild Oats (2016) with Jessica Lange and Shirley MacLaine, and the short comedy film Urges (2020). In 2021 she appeared as Catherine Martin in the television series Clarice. In 2011, she appeared in the music video for Rodney Atkins' song Take a Back Road.

In 2020, Carpenter starred in the feature psychological thriller film Painter as an Art Student.

== Personal life ==
Carpenter supports rescue dogs, including fostering and supporting adoptive families through charitable organizations such as The REAL Bark, A Purposeful Rescue, Frosted Faces Foundation, Paws for Life K9 Rescue and Angel City Pit Bulls.

== Filmography ==
Film and television roles
Year	Title	Role	Notes
2011	Rodney Atkins' Take a Back Road	Country girl with dog	Music video
2016	Wild Oats	Waitress	Film
2017	Criminal Minds	Kay	TV series
2017	Rumspringa	Kristina Eckhart	Short film
2018	Good Girls	Underwear Girl	TV series
2019	Killing Mom	Kristin	Short film
2020	Urges	D	Short film
2020	Painter	Art Student	Indie feature film
2020	Closure	Julie	Short film
2021	Clarice	Catherine Martin	TV series
2025	Matlock	Ellie Kingston	TV series Guest role
