= Devyn Tyler =

American actress

- Born: Devyn Ariel Tyler; May 7, 1991 (age 34); New Orleans, Louisiana, U.S.
- Education: Columbia University (BA)
- Occupation: Actress
- Years active: 2004–present

Devyn Ariel Tyler is an American actress. She is a regular on the TV series Snowfall and Clarice.

== Biography ==
Tyler was born in New Orleans to actress Deneen Tyler. She attended the Kinder High School for the Performing and Visual Arts in Houston and graduated from Columbia University in 2013. She has been acting since age eight, landing minor roles in The Curious Case of Benjamin Button and The Great Debaters before taking a break to study French and Francophone studies at Columbia. She returned to acting after college, appearing in TV shows Clarice (2021–present) as well as The Underground Railroad (2021), Fear the Walking Dead (2020), The Purge (2018–2020) and Watchmen (2019). Her movie credits include Deep Water (2022).

== Filmography ==
=== Film ===
Year	Title	Role	Notes
2004	Stuck in the Suburbs	Devyn	
2005	Now You See It...	Linking Rings Girl	
2006	Glory Road	Cager's Sister	
2007	The Great Debaters	Helen Farmer	
2008	The Curious Case of Benjamin Button	Queenie's Daughter Age 14	
2013	12 Years a Slave	Margarett Northup (adult)	
2016	Shock and Awe	Reporter #1	
2018	Supercon	Tameron	
2018	Out of Blue	Stella Honey	
2019	Synchronic	Danika	
2020	Unhinged	Mrs. Ayers	
2020	Antebellum	Melanie (Young Woman #2 at Conference)	
2021	Night Teeth	The Concierge	
2022	Deep Water	Mary Washington	
TBA	The Life and Deaths of Wilson Shedd	TBA	Post-production

=== Television ===
Year	Title	Role	Notes
2010	The Gates	Mia Muller	6 episodes
2016	Underground	Seraphina	3 episodes
2016	NCIS: New Orleans	Amelia Boyd	Episode: "Second Line"
2017	Dynasty	Brianna	Episode: "I Hardly Recognized You"
2018	The Quad	Mina Berry	2 episodes
2018	Queen Sugar	Elaine	Episode: "The Tree and Stone Were One"
2018	The First	Samantha	2 episodes
2019	Cloak & Dagger	Ballet Instructor	2 episodes
2019	Hot Date	Liz	Episode: "Wedding Planning"
2019	Watchmen	Elise Abar	Episode: "An Almost Religious Awe"
2019	The Purge	Tonya	4 episodes
2020	Fear the Walking Dead	Nora	2 episodes
2021	The Underground Railroad	Meg	Episode: "Chapter 2: South Carolina"
2021	Clarice	Ardelia Mapp	Main role
2022	Snowfall	Veronique Turner	Main role
