= The Silence of the Lambs (novel) =

1988 book by Thomas Harris

The Silence of The Lambs
- First edition US cover
- Author: Thomas Harris
- Language: English
- Series: Hannibal Lecter
- Genre: Psychological horror, thriller, mystery
- Publisher: St. Martin's Press
- Publication date: August 29, 1988
- Publication place: United States
- Media type: Print (Hardback & Paperback)
- Pages: 338 pp (hardcover)
- ISBN: 0-312-02282-4
- OCLC: 18049053
- Dewey Decimal: 813/.54 19
- LC Class: PS3558.A6558 S5 1988
- Preceded by: Red Dragon
- Followed by: Hannibal

The Silence of the Lambs is a 1988 psychological horror crime thriller novel by Thomas Harris. Published August 29, it is the sequel to Harris's 1981 novel Red Dragon, and both novels feature the cannibalistic serial killer and brilliant psychiatrist Dr. Hannibal Lecter. This time, however, he is pitted against FBI trainee Clarice Starling as she works to solve the case of the "Buffalo Bill" serial killer. St. Martin’s Press also issued uncorrected proof copies in 1988, which are considered scarce by collectors. It is the most well-known installment of Harris's Hannibal Lecter series, selling over 10 million copies.

The film adaptation directed by Jonathan Demme was released in 1991 to widespread critical acclaim and box office success. At the 64th Academy Awards ceremony, it won all five of the "Big Five" Oscars, becoming the third and most recent film to do so, and the first film since One Flew Over the Cuckoo's Nest in 1975. To date, it is the only horror film to win the Academy Award for Best Picture.

== Synopsis ==
In 1983, three years after the events of Red Dragon, Clarice Starling, a young FBI trainee, is asked to carry out an errand by Jack Crawford, the head of the FBI division that creates psychological profiles of serial killers.

Starling is to present a questionnaire to the brilliant forensic psychiatrist and cannibalistic serial killer, Hannibal Lecter. Lecter is serving nine consecutive life sentences in a Maryland mental institution for a series of murders. Crawford's real intention, however, is to solicit Lecter's assistance in the hunt for a serial killer dubbed "Buffalo Bill." The killer's M.O. involves kidnapping large women, starving them for up to two weeks, killing and skinning them, and dumping the remains in nearby rivers. The nickname originated from Kansas City Homicide as a sick joke that "he likes to skin his humps."

Although initially dismissive of Starling's questions, Lecter is offended when another inmate flings semen at her. As an apology, Lecter predicts that Buffalo Bill's next victim will be scalped and tells her to locate a car owned by Benjamin Raspail, a former patient whom Lecter eventually murdered. When Starling locates the car in a storage unit, she discovers a severed head preserved in a jar, which Lecter later identifies as Raspail's lover, Klaus.

Throughout the investigation, Starling periodically returns to Lecter in search of information, and the two form a strange relationship in which he offers her cryptic clues in exchange for details about her troubled and bleak childhood as an orphan. Starling must also contend with Dr. Frederick Chilton, the asylum's administrator and Lecter's self-styled nemesis, who makes sexual advances toward Starling and attempts to insert himself into the investigation for his own gain.

When Bill's sixth victim is found in West Virginia, Starling assists Crawford in performing the autopsy. The victim has a pupa stuffed in her throat and, just as Lecter predicted, has been scalped. Triangular patches of skin have also been removed from her shoulders. Furthermore, autopsy reports indicate that Bill killed her within four days of her capture, much faster than his earlier victims. Starling takes the pupa to the Smithsonian, where it is initially identified as the black witch moth, a species that does not naturally occur where the victim was found. Later, it is identified as the Death's-head Moth, an even more exotic species that would have to be reared in captivity from imported eggs. A similar pupa is found in Klaus' head, and based on this connection, Starling believes that Lecter knows Buffalo Bill's identity. She asks Crawford, who is caring for his terminally ill wife, Bella, why she was sent to fish for information on Buffalo Bill without being informed of her true purpose. Crawford claims that if she had had an agenda, Lecter would have sensed it and never spoken up.

In Tennessee, Catherine Baker Martin, the daughter of Senator Ruth Martin, is kidnapped. Her blouse is found on the roadside, slit up the back - Buffalo Bill's calling card. He traps her in an oubliette and begins to starve her. Crawford is advised that the President of the United States has expressed "intense interest" in the case and that a successful rescue is preferable. Crawford estimates they have three days before Catherine is killed.

Starling is sent to Lecter with a deal: if he assists in Catherine's rescue and Buffalo Bill's capture, he will be transferred out of the asylum to a facility that offers a view, with privileges to visit a secluded beach and enjoy the outdoors one week a year. Although skeptical about the genuineness of the offer, Lecter does not believe that Starling would intentionally lie to him. He tells her that Buffalo Bill has come to believe he is transsexual, despite this self-diagnosis being consistently deemed false by doctors, leading to his rejection for sexual reassignment surgery by multiple hospitals.

After Starling leaves, Lecter reminisces about the past, recalling the therapy session during which he murdered Benjamin Raspail. Raspail told Lecter about a former lover, Jame Gumb: after Raspail left Gumb and began dating a sailor named Klaus, Gumb became jealous and murdered Klaus, using his skin to make an apron. Raspail also revealed that Gumb had an epiphany upon watching a butterfly hatch.

Lecter's ruminations are interrupted when Chilton steps in. Having heard Starling's offer via a listening device, Chilton has discovered that Crawford's deal is a lie. He offers his own: if Lecter reveals Buffalo Bill's identity, he will indeed get a transfer to another asylum, but only if credit goes to Chilton. Lecter agrees but insists that he be allowed to give the information to Senator Martin in person, in Tennessee. Unbeknownst to Chilton, Lecter has secretly collected the ingredients for an improvised handcuff lockpick.

In Tennessee, Lecter toys with Senator Martin briefly, enjoying her anguish, but eventually provides some information about Buffalo Bill: his name is Billy Rubin, and he has suffered from "elephant ivory anthrax", a knifemaker's disease. He also provides an accurate physical description. The name, however, is a red herring: bilirubin is a pigment in human bile and a chief coloring agent in human feces, which the forensic lab compares to the color of Chilton's hair.

Starling makes one final attempt to get information from Lecter as he is held in police custody. He offers a final clue—"we covet what we see every day"—and demands to hear her worst memory. Starling reveals that, after her father's death, she was sent to live with a cousin on a sheep and horse ranch. One night, she discovered the rancher slaughtering the spring lambs and fled in terror with a horse also destined for the slaughterhouse. The local sheriff caught her, and the rancher sent her to an orphanage, where she spent the rest of her childhood. Lecter, seeing the parallels between the helpless lambs and the equally helpless Catherine, thanks her for her candor, and the two share a brief moment of connection before Chilton forces her to leave. Shortly after, Lecter escapes custody by killing and eviscerating his guards, using one of their faces as a mask to fool paramedics.

Crawford and Starling are blamed by the Attorney General's office for Lecter's escape, and Starling is threatened with expulsion from Quantico. The same day, Bella Crawford passes away. Despite the risk to her career, Starling continues her search for Buffalo Bill, deducing that he knew his first victim, Fredrica Bimmel, from everyday life. She visits Fredrica's family home, discovers that she was an accomplished tailor, and realizes that the pieces of skin Buffalo Bill takes from his victims are in the shape of a tailor's pattern: he is killing the women to make a 'suit' for himself to become a woman. By canvassing Bimmel's known associates, she ends up at the house of one Jame Gumb, a dressmaker and leatherworker. She spies a Death's-head moth in his home and draws her gun on Gumb; however, he escapes into his basement. Starling, armed only with a revolver but aware that calling for backup will result in Catherine's death, follows him down and kills him after a protracted chase. Catherine is returned to her family physically unharmed.

Lecter, hiding in a St. Louis hotel room and preparing to escape to South America, writes several letters: one to Barney, an orderly at the asylum, thanking and tipping him for his courteous treatment, and one to Chilton, promising retaliation and torture. He also pens a congratulatory letter to Starling, in which he hopes that "the lambs have stopped screaming" and indicates that he has no plans to pursue her. He correctly predicts that saving Catherine Martin may have granted Clarice some relief but that the silence will never become eternal, foreshadowing her motives for a continued career at the FBI. The novel ends with Clarice sleeping peacefully "in the silence of the lambs".

== Characters ==
- Clarice Starling
- Dr. Hannibal Lecter
- Jack Crawford
- Jame "Buffalo Bill" Gumb
- Dr. Frederick Chilton
- Catherine Baker Martin
- Senator Ruth Martin
- Ardelia Mapp
- Barney Matthews
- John Brigham
- Albert Roden
- Noble Pilcher
- Paul Krendler
- I. J. Miggs
- Alonzo
- Sammie
- Jeff

== Literary significance ==
The novel was a great success. David Foster Wallace used the book as part of his curriculum while teaching at Pomona College and later included the book, as well as Harris's Red Dragon, on his list of ten favorite novels. John Dunning says of Silence of the Lambs: [it is] "simply the best thriller I've read in five years".

Some critics and transgender activists have criticized the novel as transphobic and homophobic because of its portrayal of Buffalo Bill. Because of this there were protests against the film version when it was released. The book was criticized by feminist author Julia Serano for presenting transsexualism as psychosis, despite Harris' insistence in the text that Jame Gumb was not a true transsexual.

== Accolades ==
- The novel won the 1988 Bram Stoker Award for Best Novel.
- The novel also won the 1989 Anthony Award for Best Novel.
- It was nominated for the 1989 World Fantasy Award.

== Film adaptation ==
Following the 1986 adaptation of Red Dragon (filmed as Manhunter), The Silence of the Lambs was adapted by Jonathan Demme in 1991. The Silence of the Lambs became the third film in Oscar history to win the following five Academy Awards: Best Picture, Best Director, Best Screenplay, Best Actor and Best Actress. It stars Jodie Foster as Clarice Starling and Anthony Hopkins as Hannibal Lecter. The film is largely faithful to the novel, but omits a few details, such as the death of Crawford's wife and Clarice's relationship with Dr. Pilcher.

== Musical adaptation ==
In 2005, comedian-musicians Jon and Al Kaplan parodied the story, especially the film, in Silence! The Musical. It premiered Off-Off-Broadway and has since had productions in London and Los Angeles. In 2012, the Los Angeles production won the Los Angeles Drama Critics Circle awards for Score, Lead Performance, and Choreography.

== Stage adaptation ==
A stage adaptation, written by Gina Gionfriddo, debuted in Leicester, England in August 2026.

== Series adaptation ==
A series called Clarice, which was created by Jenny Lumet and Alex Kurtzman, aired on CBS in 2021. The series takes place three years after the events of the 1991 film adaptation of the novel, and it stars Rebecca Breeds as Clarice Starling. It was cancelled after one season.
