= Films and television shows produced in Wilmington, North Carolina =

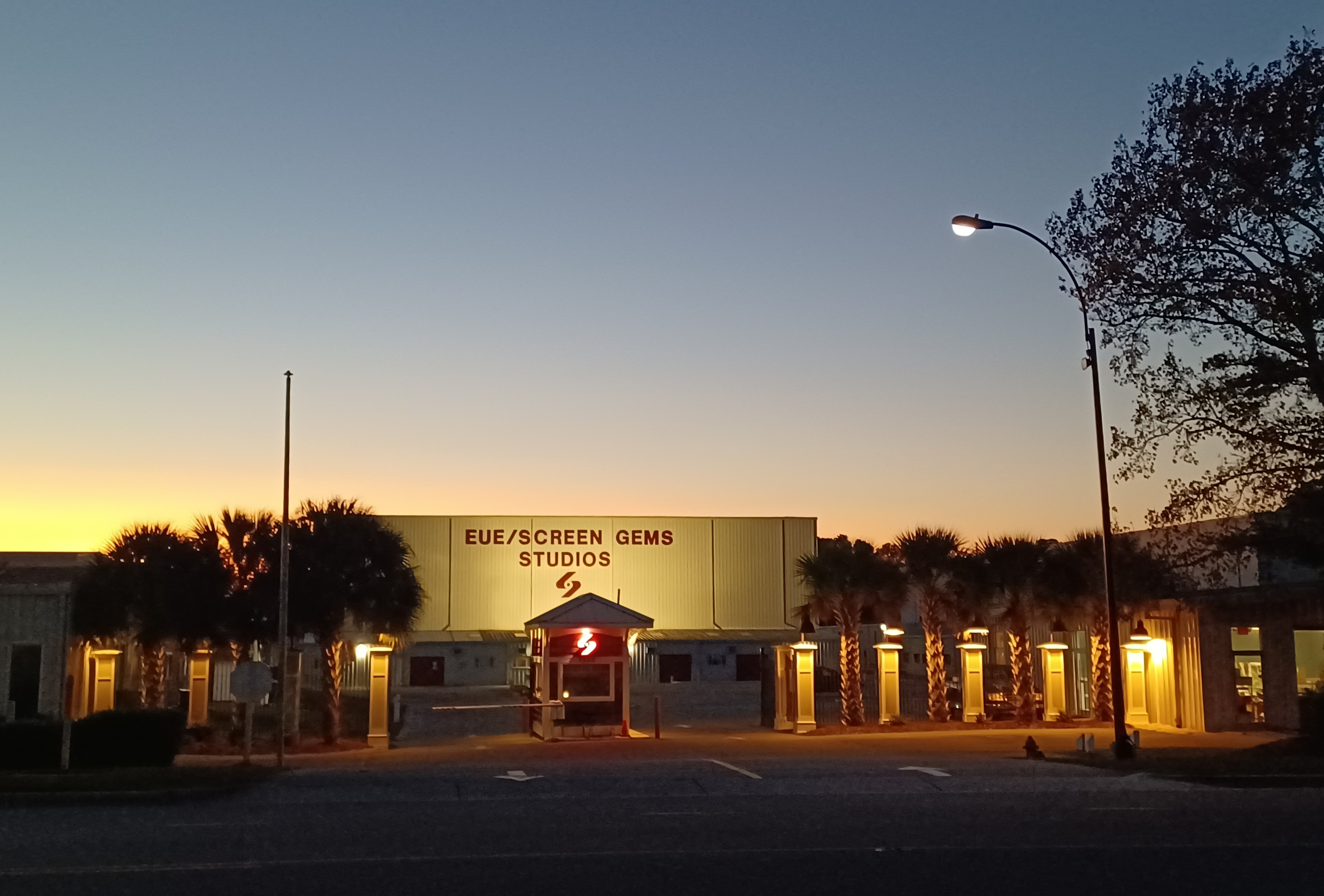
EUE/Screen Gems Studios (now Cinespace Wilmington) in November 2022

Film and television shot/produced in Wilmington, North Carolina, are usually independent and/or low-budget films, mainly due to Wilmington being relatively more affordable than other cities to film in. Other reasons for Wilmington's appeal include its local university (UNCW), its location on the coast, the presence of many historic buildings/sites, and vast swamps and waterways outside of Wilmington. It has remained the largest film and television production area in North Carolina since the 1980s, when the first major productions started to be made in the region.

Producer Dino De Laurentiis first came to Wilmington to film Firestarter, which was released in 1984. He would later create De Laurentiis Entertainment Group (DEG), build a studio complex (operated by a subsidiary called the North Carolina Film Corporation), and found its headquarters in Wilmington; the film studio began releasing films in 1986. After it declared Chapter 11 bankruptcy in 1989, most of the company as well as its studio complex in Wilmington was sold to Carolco Pictures. The company would later declare Chapter 11 bankruptcy and the same studio complex was sold to EUE/Screen Gems in 1996.

In 2013, Marvel Studios' Iron Man 3 was released to theaters; some places used in the film were the Port of Wilmington, Cape Fear River, and New Hanover Regional Medical Center. It remains the largest film to be shot in Wilmington and North Carolina. In the mid- to late-2010s, the city's film industry slowed due to the North Carolina General Assembly not extending pre-2014 film incentives and Governor Pat McCrory signing the controversial House Bill 2 (HB2) in 2017. Most of the business went to other major cities, including Atlanta, Georgia, where EUE/Screen Gems also had a studio complex.

Around the early 2020s—after the COVID-19 lockdowns, repeal of HB2, and changes to state film incentives—filming in the area began to increase again, with 2021 being the industry's biggest year to date, breaking the previous record set in 2012. 2021 was also the biggest year for the whole film industry at large in the state of North Carolina. In 2022, Dark Horse Studios—which became Wilmington's second film studio in 2020—planned a 20-million-dollar expansion to their studio complex in Wilmington, set to be complete in 2024. On September 27, 2023, Cinespace Studios announced it had purchased two EUE/Screen Gems Studios locations in Wilmington and Atlanta.

As of 2020, 138 films and 162 television shows/series have been shot/produced in the city. Wilmington has been many nicknames refencing its film industry, including "Wilmywood" and "Hollywood of the East" or "Hollywood East".

== Feature-length films ==
Feature-length films released between 1984 and 2024.

Title	Director(s)	Producer(s) / Executive producer(s)	Production company(ies) (* = Distributor / ** = International distributor)	Genre	Year	Notes
20 Funerals	Anghus Houvouras	Dan Edgell, David Eubanks, James Register, Eric Tomosunas	Swirl Films	Action-thriller	2004	
The 27 Club	Erica Dunton	Bill Brady, Erica Dunton, Chiara Trento	3 Words Productions, Bystander Films	Drama	2008	
28 Days	Betty Thomas	Jenno Topping	Columbia Pictures, Sony Pictures Releasing,* Tall Trees Productions	Comedy	2000	
The Adventures of Elmo in Grouchland	Gary Halvorson	Marjorie Kalins, Alex Rockwell	Children’s Television Workshop, Columbia Pictures, Jim Henson Pictures, Sony Pictures Releasing*	Children's film	1999	
Alan & Naomi	Sterling Van Wagenen	Dave Anderson, Mark Balsam	PorchLight Entertainment	Drama	1992	
Along for the Ride	Sofia Alvarez	Eric Newman, Bryan Unkeless	Screen Arcade, Netflix	Drama	2022	
Amos & Andrew	E. Max Frye	Gary Goetzman	Castle Rock Entertainment, Columbia Pictures,* New Line Cinema	Black comedy	1993	
The Angel Doll	Alexander Johnston	Jerry Bledsoe, Rex Fuqua, K.B. Edwards, Laura B. Edwards, Julie Hingle, Pat Hingle, Elaine Johnston, Trenton McDevitt	Angel Doll Productions, Wild Bunch Films	Drama	2002	
Arthur Newman	Dante Ariola	Mac Cappuccino, Becky Johnston, Brian Oliver, Alisa Tager	Cinedigm Entertainment,* Cross Creek Pictures, Focus Features International,** Vertebra Films	Comedy	2012	
The Bedroom Window	Curtis Hanson	Martha De Laurentiis, Robert Towne	De Laurentiis Entertainment Group	Psychological thriller	1987	
Betsy's Wedding	Alan Alda	Martin Bregman, Louis A. Stroller	Buena Vista Pictures Distribution,* Martin Bregman Productions, Silver Screen Partners IV, Touchstone Pictures	Romantic comedy	1990	
Billy Bathgate	Robert Benton	Robert F. Colesberry, Arlene Donovan	Buena Vista Pictures,* Touchstone Pictures	Biographical	1991	
Black Dog	Kevin Hooks	Raffaella De Laurentiis, Mark W. Koch, Peter Saphier	BBC, Marubeni Corporation, Tele München Group, Mutual Film Company, Prelude Pictures, UGC P.H., Universal Pictures*	Action	1998	
Black Knight	Gil Junger	Michael Green, Arnon Milchan, Darryl J. Quarles, Paul Schiff	20th Century Studios,* The Firm, Inc., Regency Enterprises, Runteldat Entertainment	Adventure comedy	2001	
The Black Phone	Scott Derrickson	Jason Blum, C. Robert Cargill, Scott Derrickson	Blumhouse Productions, Crooked Highway, Universal Pictures*	Horror	2021	
The Bleeding	Charlie Picerni	Michael Tadross Jr.	Anchor Bay Entertainment,* Iron Bull Films	Action horror	2009	
Bloodmoon	Siu Lung Leung	Ng See-yuen, Keith W. Strandberg	Media of Medias, Seasonal Film Corporation	Action	1997	
Bloodworth	Shane Dax Taylor	Darryl Atwater, Kendi Atwater, W. Earl Brown, Kenneth Burke, T Bone Burnett, Travis Nicholson, Corey Taylor, Shane Dax Taylor	Buffalo Bulldog Films, Dax Productions, Provinces of Night, Racer Entertainment, Samuel Goldwyn Films*	Drama	2010	
Blue Mountain State: The Rise of Thadland	Lev L. Spiro	Eric Falconer, Eric Fischer, Michael Keller, Alan Ritchson, Chris Romano	AllyCat Entertainment, BMS Brands, Dead Fish Films, Falconer/Romanski, Lionsgate,* Union Entertainment Group (II)	Comedy	2016	
Blue Velvet	David Lynch	Fred C. Caruso	De Laurentiis Entertainment Group	Mystery	1986	
Bolden	Dan Pritzker	Jonathan Cornick, Michele Tayler	Abramorama,* King Bolden LLC	Drama	2019	
Boys of Summer	David Henrie	John Blandford, Amanda Devine, Mark Fasano, James Henrie, Annie Mahoney, Dan McDonough, Darren Moorman, Scott Pomeroy, Tobias Weymar	Nickel City Pictures, Novo Media Group, Pastime Pictures	Adventure	2024	
Breakwater	James Rowe	Larry Hummel, Dana Lustig, Jeff Maynard, Matt Paul, Edward Winters	Loose Cannon Pictures (II)	Thriller	2022	
Bruno	Shirley MacLaine	David Kirkpatrick	New Angel Films	Comedy	2000	
Cabin Fever 2: Spring Fever	Ti West	Patrick Derham, Lauren Moews, Jonathan Sachar,	Aloe Entertainment, Lionsgate,* Morningstar Films, Proud Mary Entertainment, Tonic Films	Horror-comedy	2009	
Cat's Eye	Lewis Teague	Dino De Laurentiis, Martha De Laurentiis	MGM/UA Entertainment Co.	Horror	1985	
Chasers	Dennis Hopper	James G. Robinson	Morgan Creek Productions, Warner Bros.*	Comedy	1994	
The Choice	Ross Katz	Theresa Park, Peter Safran, Nicholas Sparks	Lionsgate,* Nicholas Sparks Productions, The Safran Company	Romantic Drama	2016	
Collision Course	Lewis Teague	Robert W. Cort, Ted Field	De Laurentiis Entertainment Group,* Interscope Communications	Action comedy	1989	
The Conjuring	James Wan	Rob Cowan, Tony DeRosa-Grund, Peter Safran	Evergreen Media Group, New Line Cinema, The Safran Company, Warner Bros. Pictures*	Horror	2013	
Crimes of the Heart	Bruce Beresford	Freddie Fields	De Laurentiis Entertainment Group	Black comedy	1986	
The Crow	Alex Proyas	Grant Hill, Jeff Most, Edward R. Pressman	Dimension Films, Entertainment Media Investment Corporation, Jeff Most Productions, Miramax Films,* Pressman Film	Action	1994	Actor Brandon Lee was fatally shot during filming due to issues involving the prop gun, causing a bullet fragment to be fired at Lee.
The Cutoff	Art Camacho	Michael Depasquale Jr., Tony Errico, Gerald Waller	Errico/Depasquale/Waller, Screen Action Pictures Inc.	Action	1998	
Cyborg	Albert Pyun	Yoram Globus, Menahem Golan	The Cannon Group, Inc.	Action	1989	
The Dangerous Lives of Altar Boys	Peter Care	Jodie Foster, Meg LeFauve, Todd McFarlane, Jay Shapiro	Egg Pictures, Initial Entertainment Group, ThinkFilm*	Comedy	2002	
Date with an Angel	Tom McLoughlin	Martha De Laurentiis	De Laurentiis Entertainment Group	Comedy	1987	
Dead Heist	Bo Webb	David Eubanks, James Register, Eric Tomosunas	Swirl Films	Action	2007	
Divine Secrets of the Ya-Ya Sisterhood	Callie Khouri	Bonnie Bruckheimer, Hunt Lowry, Bette Midler	Gaylord Films, Warner Bros. Pictures*	Comedy drama	2002	
Domestic Disturbance	Harold Becker	Jonathan D. Krane, Donald De Line	Paramount Pictures	Psychological thriller	2001	
Dracula's Widow	Christopher Coppola	Stephen Traxler	De Laurentiis Entertainment Group	Horror	1988	
Dream a Little Dream	Marc Rocco	D.E. Eisenberg, Marc Rocco	Vestron Pictures	Romantic comedy	1989	
Drought	Hannah Black, Megan Petersen	Hannah Black, Jay Duplass, Mark Duplass, Dallas Morgan, Tahlia Morgan, Megan Petersen	BrighterMoon Entertainment, Duplass Brothers Productions, The Lighthouse Film Company, Same Page Pictures	Drama	2020	
Empire Records	Allan Moyle	Arnon Milchan, Michael Nathanson, Alan Riche	Regency Enterprises, Warner Bros.*	Comedy	1995	
Enchanted	John Ward	Jolly Dale, Joe Dallesandro, John Ward	Go West Productions LLC	Comedy	1998	
Eric Larue	Michael Shannon	Sarah Green, Karl Hartman, Jina Panebianco	Big Cove Productions, Big Indie Pictures, CaliWood Pictures	Drama	2023	
Everyone Wins	Karel Reisz	Jeremy Thomas	Orion Pictures,* Recorded Picture Company	Mystery	1990	
Evil Dead II	Sam Raimi	Robert Tapert	Renaissance Pictures, Rosebud Releasing Corporation*	Comedy horror	1987	
The Exorcism	M. A. Fortin, Joshua John Miller	Bill Block, Ben Fast, Kevin Williamson	Miramax, Outerbanks Entertainment, Vertical*	Horror	2024	
The Exorcist III	Peter Beatty	Carter DeHaven, James G. Robinson	20th Century Studios,* Morgan Creek Productions	Psychological thriller	1990	
Firestarter	Mark L. Lester	Frank Capra Jr., Martha De Laurentiis	Dino De Laurentiis Company, Universal Pictures*	Horror	1984	
Forgiven	Paul Fitzgerald	Tracy Kilpatrick, Kelly Miller, Mimi Wyeth	N/A	Drama	2006	
From the Hip	Bob Clark	Bob Clark, René Dupont	De Laurentiis Entertainment Group	Comedy drama	1987	
A Good Old Fashioned Orgy	Alex Gregory, Peter Huyck	Brian R. Etting, James D. Stern	Endgame Entertainment, Samuel Goldwyn Films*	Comedy	2011	
The Grave	Jonas Pate	Peter Glatzer, Scott Kalmbach, Donald Kushner, Peter Locke, Lawrence Mortorff	The Kushner-Locke Company, New City Releasing*	Thriller	1996	
Greedy People	Potsy Ponciroli	David Boies, Shannon Houchins, Chris Parker, Zack Schiller, Dylan Sellers	Boies Schiller Entertainment, Hideout Pictures, Limelight	Mystery	2024	
Halloween Kills	David Gordon Green	Malek Akkad, Bill Block, Jason Blum	Blumhouse Productions, Compass International Pictures, Miramax, Rough House Productions, Universal Pictures*	Horror	2021	
Heart of the Country	John Ward	Anne Hawthorne, Wayne Thompson, John Ward	20th Century Fox Home Entertainment,* Bay Ridge Films	Drama	2013	
Hick	Derick Martini	Charles DePortes, Jonathan Cornick, Steven Siewert, Christian Taylor	Lighthouse Entertainment, Phase 4 Films,* Stone River Productions, Taylor Lane Productions	Comedy drama	2011	
Hiding Out	Bob Giraldi	Jeff Rothberg	De Laurentiis Entertainment Group	Comedy	1987	
Horror Story	Alexander Johnston	Gary Chadwick, David Benford, Christopher Bromley, James Knowles, Marianne Scanlon	Inconseevable Productions I	Horror Thriller	1997	
Hounddog	Deborah Kampmeier	Raye Dowell, Jen Gatien, Deborah Kampmeier, Terry Leonard, Robin Wright Penn	Empire Film Group, Hannover House	Drama	2007	
Household Saints	Nancy Savoca	Jonathan Demme, Richard Guay, Peter Newman	Fine Line Features	Drama	1993	
The Hudsucker Proxy	Coen brothers	Coen brothers	PolyGram Filmed Entertainment, Rank Film Distributors,** Silver Pictures, Working Title Films, Warner Bros.*	Comedy	1994	
I Know What You Did Last Summer	Jim Gillespie	Stokely Chaffin, Erik Feig, Neal H. Moritz	Columbia Pictures,* Mandalay Entertainment	Horror	1997	
Idlewild	Bryan Barber	Robert Guralnick, Charles Roven	Atlas Entertainment, Forensic Files, HBO Films, Mosaic Media Group, Universal Pictures*	Musical	2006	
Iron Man 3	Shane Black	Kevin Feige	Marvel Studios, Walt Disney Studios Motion Pictures*	Superhero	2013	Largest film shot in Wilmington as well as North Carolina.
I.S.S.	Gabriela Cowperthwaite	Mickey Liddell, Pete Shilaimon	LD Entertainment	Science fiction	2023	
The Jackal	Michael Caton-Jones	Michael Caton-Jones, Sean Daniel, James Jacks, Kevin Jarre	Alphaville Films, Mutual Film Company, Universal Pictures*	Action-thriller	1997	
Jessabelle	Kevin Greutert	Jason Blum	Blumhouse Productions, Lionsgate	Horror	2014	
Journey 2: The Mysterious Island	Brad Peyton	Beau Flynn, Charlotte Higgins, Tripp Vinson	Contrafilm, New Line Cinema, Walden Media, Warner Bros. Pictures*	Action adventure	2012	
King Kong Lives	John Guillermin	Martha De Laurentiis	De Laurentiis Entertainment Group	Adventure	1986	
Kyoko	Ryū Murakami	Roger Corman	Concorde-New Horizons, Delta Corporation**	Drama	1996	
The Last Summer	Jonathan Landau-Litewski	Richard Finney, Jonathan Landau-Litewski, Terence Michael, David Schifter, Gerry White	D Productions, Film Artists Network, Michael/Finney Productions	Drama	2004	
The List	Gary Wheeler	Kevin Downes, Gary Wheeler, Kathy Whitlow, Robert Whitlow	Level Path Productions, Mountain Top Releasing	Thriller	2007	
Little Monsters	Richard Alan Greenberg	John Davis, Jack Grossberg, Andrew Licht, Jeffrey A. Mueller	Davis Entertainment Company, Licht/Mueller Film Corporation, United Artists,* Vestron Pictures	Comedy	1989	
Loggerheads	Tim Kirkman	Gill Holland	Strand Releasing	Drama	2005	
Lolita	Adrian Lyne	Mario Kassar, Joel B. Michaels	AMLF,** Pathé, The Samuel Goldwyn Company*	Drama	1997	
The Longest Ride	George Tillman Jr.	Marty Bowen, Sheena Easton, Wyck Godfrey, Nicholas Sparks	20th Century Studios,* Fox 2000 Pictures, Temple Hill Entertainment	Western	2015	
Loose Cannons	Bob Clark	Alan Griesman, Aaron Spelling	TriStar Pictures	Action comedy	1990	
Manhunter	Michael Mann	Richard A. Roth	De Laurentiis Entertainment Group	Crime	1986	
The Marc Pease Experience	Todd Louiso	Michael London, Bruna Papandrea, David Rubin	Paramount Vantage	Comedy	2009	
Marie	Roger Donaldson	Frank Capra Jr., Elliot Schick	MGM/UA Entertainment Co.	Biographical	1985	
Mary and Martha	Phillip Noyce	Tim Bevan, Lisa Bruce, Liza Chasin, Eric Fellner, Genevieve Hofmeyr, Hilary Bevan Jones, Juliette Powell, Lucy Richer	BBC, HBO Films, NBC Universal Television, Working Title Television	Drama	2013	
Max Steel	Stewart Hendler	Bill O'Dowd, Julia Pistor	Dolphin Films, IM Global,** Ingenious Media, Mattel Playground Productions, Open Road Films*	Superhero	2016	
Maximum Overdrive	Stephen King	Martha De Laurentiis	De Laurentiis Entertainment Group	Comedy horror	1986	
Morgan's Ferry	Sam Pillsbury	Greg Bernstein, Eric R. Epperson, Penelope L. Foster, Daniel Levin, Alan James, Kathy McCormick	Morgan's Ferry Productions LLC, Oregon Trail Films Ltd., Platform Entertainment	Crime Drama	2001	
Muppets from Space	Tim Hill	Martin G. Baker, Brian Henson	Columbia Pictures, Jim Henson Pictures, Sony Pictures Releasing*	Comedy drama	1999	
My Summer Story (It Runs in the Family)	Bob Clark	Rene Dupont	Metro-Goldwyn-Mayer	Black comedy	1994	
My Teacher's Wife	Bruce Leddy	Robert N. Fried, Stan Wlodkowski, Richard J. Zinman	Fried Films, Savoy Pictures, Trimark Pictures	Comedy	1995	
New Best Friend	Zoe Clarke-Williams	Frank Mancuso Jr.	TriStar Pictures	Psychological thriller	2002	
The Night Flier	Mark Pavia	Mitchell Galin, Richard P. Rubinstein	New Line Cinema	Horror	1997	
Nights in Rodanthe	George C. Wolfe	Denise Di Novi	Di Novi Pictures, Village Roadshow Pictures, Warner Bros. Pictures*	Romantic Drama	2008	
No Mercy	Richard Pearce	D. Constantine Conte	Delphi Productions, TriStar Pictures*	Crime-thriller	1986	
One True Loves	Andy Fickman	Adam Beasley, Andy Fickman, Sarah Finn, Arianne Fraser, Petr Jákl, Michael Jefferson, Willie Kutner, Betsy Sullenger	The Avenue,* Highland Film Group, R.U. Robot, Volition Media Partners	Romance	2022	
Once Upon a Time...When We Were Colored	Tim Reid	Michael Bennett, Tim Reid	BET Pictures, Legacy Releasing Corporation,* United Image Entertainment	Period drama	1996	
The Pavilion	C. Grant Mitchell	Jack C. Merrick, Dan Reardon, Pamela Vlastas	Graden Floe Production, Quantum Entertainment	Drama	2000	
Piranha 3DD	John Gulager	Mark Canton, Joel Soisson, Marc Toberoff	Dimension Films,* Mark Canton/IPW, Neo Art & Logic, Radius-TWC	Horror-comedy	2012	
Radioland Murders	Mel Smith	George Lucas, Rick McCallum, Fred Roos	LucasFilm, Ltd., Universal Pictures	Comedy	1994	
Rambling Rose	Martha Coolidge	Renny Harlin, Mario Kassar, Edgar J. Scherick	Carolco Pictures, Midnight Sun Pictures, Seven Arts Productions (through New Line Cinema as distributor)*	Drama	1991	
Raw Deal	John Irvin	Martha De Laurentiis	De Laurentiis Entertainment Group	Action	1986	
RedMeansGo	Erica Dunton	Joe Denton, Erica Dunton, Simon Ewin, Simon Gosling	Enjoy Films, JDC Films	Drama	2005	
The Remaining	Casey La Scala	Marc Bienstock, Brad Luff	Affirm Films, Triumph Films*	Horror	2014	
Remember the Daze	Jess Manafort	Jess Manafort, Judd Payne, Mathew Rhodes	First Look International, Freestyle Releasing	Comedy	2007	
The Road to Wellville	Alan Parker	Armyan Bernstein, Robert F. Colesberry, Alan Parker	Beacon Communications, Columbia Pictures,* J&M Entertainment*	Comedy drama	1994	
Safe Haven	Lasse Hallström	Marty Bowen, Chad Freet, Wyck Godfrey, Ryan Kavanaugh	Relativity Media, Temple Hill Entertainment	Romantic Drama	2013	
Scream	Matt Bettinelli-Olpin, Tyler Gillett	Paul Neinstein, William Sherak, James Vanderbilt	Paramount Pictures,* Project X Entertainment, Radio Silence Productions, Spyglass Media Group	Horror	2022	
The Secret Life of Bees	Gina Prince-Bythewood	Lauren Shuler Donner, James Lassiter, Joe Pichirallo, Will Smith	The Donners' Company, Fox Searchlight Pictures,* Overbrook Entertainment	Drama	2008	
Shadrach	Susanna Styron	Boaz Davidson, Bridget Terry, John Thompson	Columbia Pictures,* Millennium Films (in association with Nu Image)	Period drama	1998	
Silver Bullet	Dan Attias	Martha De Laurentiis	Dino De Laurentiis Company, Famous Film, Paramount Pictures*	Horror	1985	
The Sin Seer	Paul D. Hannah	Paul D. Hannah, Scott Roughgarden, Isaiah Washington, Angela White	Cassiopeia Productions, Coalhouse Productions, Overflow Entertainment, Silver Lining Entertainment	Thriller	2015	
Sleeping with the Enemy	Joseph Ruben	Leonard Goldberg	20th Century Studios	Psychological thriller	1991	
A Soldier's Daughter Never Cries	James Ivory	Ismail Merchant	20th Century Studios,** October Films,* Roseland Film Distribution**	Drama	1998	
Southern Belles	Paul S. Myers, Brennan Shroff	Craig Cohen	The Sundance Channel	Romantic comedy	2005	
The Squeeze (1987)	Roger Young	Rupert Hitzig, Michael Tanenhaus	TriStar Pictures	Action comedy	1987	
The Squeeze (2015)	Terry Jastrow	Anne Archer, Michael Doven, Terry Jastrow, Brian McCormack, George Parratt	ARC Entertainment,* Jam Films	Comedy	2015	Not related to The Squeeze (1987)
Stateside	Reverge Anselmo	Robert Greenhut	Samuel Goldwyn Films	Romantic Drama	2004	
Stuck in Love	Josh Boone	Judy Cairo	Informant Media, Millennium Entertainment, MICA Entertainment	Romantic comedy	2012	
Summer Catch	Michael Tollin	Brian Robbins, Michael Tollin, Sam Weisman	Tollin/Robbins Productions, Warner Bros. Pictures*	Romantic comedy	2001	
Super Mario Bros.	Annabel Jankel, Rocky Morton	Jake Eberts, Roland Joffé	Allied Filmmakers, Buena Vista Pictures,* Cinergi Pictures, Entertainment Film Distributors,** Hollywood Pictures, Lightmotive	Adventure comedy	1993	
The Supremes at Earl's All-You-Can-Eat	Tina Mabry	Marty Bowen, Wyck Godfrey	Searchlight Pictures,* Temple Hill Entertainment	Drama	2024	
Track Down "Takedown"	Joe Chappelle	John Thompson, Brad Weston	Dimension Films,* Millennium Media	Crime-thriller	2000	
Tammy	Ben Falcone	Will Ferrell, Melissa McCarthy	Gary Sanchez Productions, On the Day Productions, New Line Cinema, RatPac-Dune Entertainment, Warner Bros. Pictures*	Comedy	2014	
Teenage Mutant Ninja Turtles	Steve Barron	David Chan, Kim Dawson, Simon Fields	888 Productions, Golden Harvest Group, Limelight Productions, New Line Cinema*	Action	1990	
This World, Then the Fireworks	Michael Oblowitz	Larry Gross, Chris Hanley, Brad Wyman	Balzac's Shirt, JVC Entertainment Networks, Largo Entertainment, Muse Productions, Orion Pictures,* Wynard	Crime	1997	
To Gillian on Her 37th Birthday	Michael Pressman	David E. Kelley, Marykay Powell	Rastar, Triumph Films*	Romantic Drama	1996	
A Touch of Fate	Rebecca Cook	Ben Cammarata, Courtney DuBois, Nick Edney, Richard Sirianni, Courtney Williams	Velveteen Films	Drama	2003	
Track 29	Nicolas Roeg	George Harrison, Rick McCallum	The Cannon Group, Inc.,* HandMade Films, Island Pictures*	Psychological drama	1988	
Traveller	Jack N. Green	David Blocker, Mickey Liddell, Bill Paxton, Brian Swardstrom	Banner Entertainment, MDP Worldwide, October Films,* Traveler Production Company*	Crime	1997	
Traxx	Jerome Gary	Gary DeVore, Richard McWhorter	De Laurentiis Entertainment Group	Comedy	1988	
Trick or Treat	Charles Martin Smith	Michael S. Murphey, Joel Soisson	De Laurentiis Entertainment Group	Horror	1986	
Tune in Tomorrow	Jon Amiel	John Fiedler, Mark Tarlov	Cinecom Pictures	Comedy	1990	
Two Tickets to Paradise	D. B. Sweeney	D. B. Sweeney	41,* First Look International,* Scrudge LLC, Village Cinema*	Comedy	2006	
Uncle Frank	Alan Ball	Alan Ball, Bill Block, Michael Costigan, Jay Van Hoy, Peter Macdissi, Stephanie Meurer	Amazon Studios,* Byblos Entertainment, COTA Films, Miramax, Parts & Labor, Your Face Goes Here Entertainment	Comedy drama	2020	
Virus	John Bruno	Gale Anne Hurd	Dark Horse Entertainment, Universal Pictures,* Valhalla Motion Pictures	Science fiction	1999	
A Walk to Remember	Adam Shankman	Hunt Lowry, Denise Di Novi	Di Novi Pictures, Gaylord Films, Pandora Cinema, Warner Bros. Pictures*	Romantic Drama	2002	
Waterproof	Barry Bremen	Cape Fear Filmworks	Cloud Ten Pictures	Drama	2000	
We're the Millers	Rawson Marshall Thurber	Chris Bender, Vincent Newman, Tucker Tooley, Happy Walters	Benderspink, Heyday Films, New Line Cinema, Newman/Tooley Films, Slap Happy Productions, Warner Bros. Pictures*	Crime comedy	2013	
Weeds	John D. Hancock	Bill Badalato	De Laurentiis Entertainment Group	Drama	1987	
Weekend at Bernie's	Ted Kotcheff	Victor Drai	20th Century Studios,* Gladden Entertainment	Black comedy	1989	
Where the Devil Hides	Christian E. Christiansen	Paddy Cullen, Scott Holroyd, Mickey Liddell, Jennifer Monroe, Pete Shilaimon, Michael Zelman	LD Entertainment, Roadside Attractions*	Horror	2014	
White Men Can't Dance	Pete Vinal	Francine Decoursey, Pete Vinal, Jon T. Vincent	Carmike Cinemas,* Mystical Gold	Drama	2012	
Words on Bathroom Walls	Thor Freudenthal	Thor Freudenthal, Mickey Liddell, Pete Shilaimon	Kick the Habit Productions, LD Entertainment, Roadside Attractions*	Romantic Drama	2020	
Wreckage	John Asher	John Asher, Robert P. Atwell, David Frigerio, Sam Froelich, Russell Jones, Kristen Kirchner, Jordan Yale Levine, Jamie R. Thompson	David Frigerio Films, Xanthus Pictures, Yale Productions	Horror	2010	
Year of the Dragon	Michael Cimino	Dino De Laurentiis	Dino De Laurentiis Company, Metro-Goldwyn-Mayer, MGM/UA Entertainment Company,* Thorn EMI Screen Entertainment*	Crime-thriller	1985	

== Television shows and TV movies ==
Television shows/series and TV movies released between 1988 and 2024. (Excludes news stories, documentaries, or television shows that filmed a single episode in Wilmington; only notable TV movies are listed below.)

Title	Director(s) (at time)	Producer(s) / Executive producer(s) (at time)	Production company(ies) / Broadcasting company(ies) (at time) (* = Distributor)	Genre	Season(s) (Year[s])	Notes
American Gothic	Multiple	Multiple	CBS, Renaissance Pictures, Universal Worldwide Television*	Horror	1 (1995–96)	
Bastard Out of Carolina	Anjelica Huston	Amanda DiGiulio	Showtime Networks	Drama	TV movie (1996)	
The Birds II: Land's End	Rick Rosenthal	Ted Kurdyla, David A. Rosemont	MCA Television Entertainment, Rosemont Productions International, Showtime, Universal Studios*	Horror	TV movie (1994)	
Christmas in Conway	John Kent Harrison	Andrew Gottlieb	American Broadcasting Company, Hallmark Hall of Fame	Christmas	TV movie (2013)	
Dawson's Creek	Multiple	Greg Berlanti, Tom Kapinos, Greg Prange, Paul Stupin, Kevin Williamson	Columbia TriStar Television, Columbia TriStar Domestic Television, Outerbanks Entertainment, Sony Pictures Television, The WB	Teen Drama	Pilot–6 (1998–2003)	
Eastbound & Down	David Gordon Green, Jody Hill, Adam McKay	Ben Best, Will Ferrell, David Gordon Green, Chris Henchy, Jody Hill, Stephanie Laing, Danny McBride, Adam McKay	Enemy MIGs Productions, Gary Sanchez Productions, HBO (also distributor),* Rough House Pictures, Warner Bros. Television Studios*	Comedy	Pilot–4 (2009–13)	
Echoes	Vanessa Gazy	Imogen Banks, Vanessa Gazy, Quinton Peeples, Brian Yorkey	EndemolShine Banks Australia, Netflix, That Kid Ed Productions	Drama	Miniseries (2022)	
Florida Man	Donald Todd	Miguel Arteta, Jason Bateman, Michael Costigan, Donald Todd	Aggregate Films, Netflix	Drama	1 (2023)	
George & Tammy	John Hillcoat	Multiple	101 Studios, Freckle Films, Mad Chance Productions, MTV Entertainment Studios, Paramount Global Distribution,* Showtime Networks, Youth Studios	Drama	Miniseries (2022)	
Good Behavior	Multiple	Multiple	Storyland, Studio T, TNT, Tomorrow Studios, Turner International*	Drama	Pilot–2 (2016–17)	
Hightown	Multiple	Multiple	Jerry Bruckheimer Television, Starz	Crime Drama	1–3 (2020–24)	
Little Britain USA	Michael Patrick Jann, David Schwimmer	Larry Brezner, Simon Fuller, Michael Patrick Jann, Stephanie Laing, David Steinberg	19 Entertainment, HBO Entertainment, Reveille Productions, Warner Bros. Television Studios*	Comedy	1 (2008)	
Matlock	Multiple	Andy Griffith, Fred Silverman	American Broadcasting Company, CBS Television Distribution,* Dean Hargrove Productions, The Fred Silverman Company, Viacom Productions	Legal drama	7–9 (1992–94)	
Noble House	Gary Nelson	Joan Barnett, Eric Bercovici, James Clavell, Pierre Cossette, Howard Lipstone, Frederick Muller	NBC	Drama	Miniseries (1988)	
Off Season	Bruce Davison	Rose Lam	Showtime	Drama	TV movie (2001)	
One Tree Hill	Multiple	Multiple	The CW, Mastermind Laboratories, Tollin/Robbins Productions, Warner Bros. Television Studios (also distributor),* The WB	Teen Drama	Pilot–9 (2003–12)	
Our Kind of People	Wendy Calhoun, Karin Gist	Multiple	20th Television, Electus, Fox Entertainment (also distributor),* The Gist of It Productions, Lee Daniels Entertainment	Drama	1 (2021)	
Outer Banks	Shannon Burke, Jonas Pate, Josh Pate	Shannon Burke, Sunny Hodge, Aaron Miller, Jonas Pate, Josh Pate, Carole Sanders Peterman	Netflix, Red Canoe Productions, Rock Fish	Teen Drama	4–pres. (2024–pres.)	
Reprisal	Cherie Nowlan, Eva Sørhaug, Jonathan van Tulleken, Salli Richardson-Whitfield	Josh Corbin, Barry Jossen, Warren Littlefield	A&E Networks, Hulu, The Littlefield Company	Drama	Pilot–1 (2019)	
Revolution	Multiple	J. J. Abrams, Bryan Burk, Trey Callaway, Jon Favreau, Eric Kripke, Rockne S. O'Bannon, Athena Wickham, Robert M. Williams Jr.	Bad Robot, Kripke Enterprises, NBC, Warner Bros.Television Studios (also distributor)*	Science fiction	Pilot–1 (2012–13)	
Secrets and Lies	Multiple	Timothy Busfield, Barbara D'Alessandro, Joe Halpin, Caroline James, Aaron Kaplan, Barbie Kligman, Nathan Mayfield, Tracy Robertson	ABC Studios, Avenue K Productions, Hoodlum Entertainment, Kapital Entertainment	Mystery	Pilot–2 (2015–16)	
Six	Lesli Linka Glatter, Alex Graves, Clark Johnson, Kimberly Peirce, Mikael Salomon, Peter Werner	Multiple	A&E Studios, History, Paint Rock Productions, The Weinstein Company	Action	1 (2017)	
Sleepy Hollow	Multiple	Multiple	20th Century FOX Television, K/O Paper Products, Mark Goffman Productions, Sketch Films	Horror	1–2 (2013–15)	
The Summer I Turned Pretty	Jenny Han	Multiple	Amazon Studios, Big Red Bus, Jenny Kissed Me, Sunswept Entertainment, wiip	Romance	1–pres. (2022–pres.)	
Swamp Loggers	Paul Harrison	Edward Barbini, Paul Harrison, Tim Pastorea, Craig Piligian	Discovery Channel, Pilgrim Films	Reality television	1–4 (2009–12)	
Swamp Thing	Multiple	Michael Clear, Gary Dauberman, James Wan, Mark Verheiden, Len Wiseman	Atomic Monster, Big Shoe Productions Inc., DC Entertainment, DC Universe, Warner Bros. Television Studios (also distributor)*	Superhero	Pilot–1 (2019)	
Too Young the Hero	Buzz Kulik	Buzz Kulik, Alan Landsburg	CBS	War drama	TV movie (1988)	
Twilight Zone: Rod Serling's Lost Classics	Richard Matheson, Rod Serling	S. Bryan Hickox, Lawrence Horowitz, Michael O'Hara	CBS,* O'Hara-Horowitz Productions	Horror	TV movie (1994)	
Under the Dome	Multiple	Neal Baer, Jack Bender, Justin Falvey, Darryl Frank, Stephen King, Tim Schlattmann, Randy Sutter, Stacey Snider, Steven Spielberg, Brian K. Vaughan	Amblin Television, Baer Bones, CBS Television Studios (also distributor)*	Science fiction	1–3 (2013–15)	
USS Christmas	Steven R. Monroe	Jeffery Beach	Crown Media Productions, Hallmark Movies & Mysteries	Christmas	TV movie (2020)	
Welcome to Flatch	Natalie Anderson, Fernando Farías, Paul Feig, Clark Mathis, Molly McGlynn	Jenny Bicks, Charlie Cooper, Daisy May Cooper, Paul Feig, Angie Stephenson	BBC Studios, Feigco Entertainment, Fox Entertainment, Lionsgate Television, Perkins Street Productions	Comedy	1–2 (2022–23)	
Windmills of the Gods	Lee Philips	Sidney Sheldon, Michael Viner	CBS	Drama	Miniseries (1988)	
The Young Indiana Jones Chronicles	Multiple	George Lucas, Rick McCallum	ABC, Amblin Television, The Family Channel, LucasFilm, Ltd., Paramount Television Network	Adventure	1–2 (1992–93)	

== See also ==
- North Carolina Film Office
- Cucalorus Film Festival
