= North Carolina Film Office =

- Founded: 1980
- Headquarters: Raleigh, North Carolina
- Key people: Guy Gaster (Chairman and Managing director)
- Number of employees: 4
- Website: www.filmnc.com

The North Carolina Film Office, originally called the North Carolina Film Commission, is a member of the Association of Film Commissioners International.

== History ==
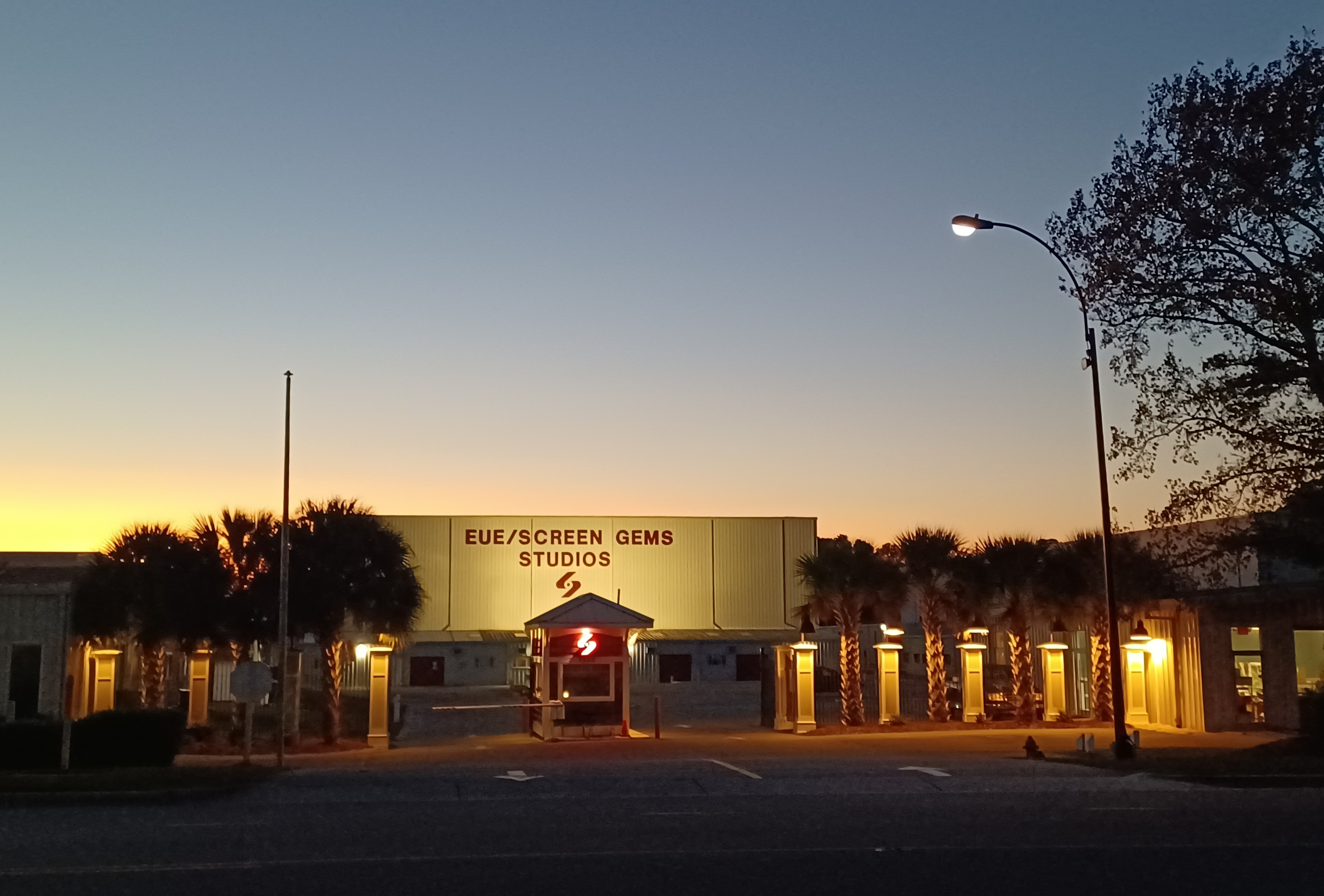
EUE/Screen Gems Studios (now Cinespace Wilmington) in November 2022

Founded in 1980 by Governor James B. Hunt, the office was commissioned to help facilitate and provide a base of operation for North Carolina's burgeoning film industry. Governor Hunt appointed William "Bill" Arnold to lead the office. In 1984, producer Dino De Laurentiis created De Laurentiis Entertainment Group (DEG). He built and based a studio complex (owned next by Carolco Pictures and then sold to EUE/Screen Gems in 1996; now owned by Cinespace Studios) in Wilmington, North Carolina. The area quickly became one of the biggest production centers for film and television east of Hollywood. The North Carolina Film Office was created when new technology, audience demand for location authenticity, and film studios' need for lower production costs were driving filmmakers to search for new locations in the US to make movies.

With Bill Arnold leading, the North Carolina Film Commission saw a major increase in film production during the 1980s and 1990s. Notable films made during this time include: The Color Purple (1985), Dirty Dancing (1987), Bull Durham (1988), Days of Thunder (1990), Sleeping with the Enemy (1991), Last of the Mohicans (1992), The Fugitive (1993), and The Crow (1994). In 1998 Wilmington became the home of the WB's critically acclaimed television network series Dawson's Creek. The series remained in Wilmington until 2003 when it was cancelled and replaced with One Tree Hill—a series on The WB/CW that calls North Carolina "home." One Tree Hill ended in 2012 after nine seasons.

While Wilmington, NC continued to sustain itself with television, the international film climate began to shift out of North Carolina's favor. In an effort to keep production costs even cheaper, early 2000 saw production companies making films internationally. The North Carolina Film Commission was made most aware of this trend when it lost Charles Frazier's North Carolina tale, Cold Mountain, to the country of Romania. Hoping to bring an international industry back to the United States, many lawmakers across the US began creating incentives packages to encourage filming in individual states. North Carolina's legislature decided on pursuing a competitive incentive program. On August 8, 2006, Governor Mike F. Easley signed into law a legislation offering productions a full 15% tax credit on a minimum $250,000 spend in North Carolina (and not to exceed a $7.5M credit.) Since this program's inception, the NC Film Office has seen a substantial increase in production, as have other state's that have established similar programs. Since 2006, the North Carolina Film Office has recruited the following films: George Clooney's Leatherheads (2008); Nights in Rodanthe (2008), starring Richard Gere and Diane Lane; The Marc Pease Experience (2008), with Ben Stiller; and Bolden (2019), a film about the life of jazz legend Buddy Bolden.

In September 2006, Commissioner Bill Arnold retired after 26 years of service to North Carolina's film industry. The North Carolina Film Office is now part of the NC Department of Commerce's Division of Tourism, Film and Sports Development. Aaron Syrett (former Director of the Utah Film Commission) was hired as Director of the North Carolina Film Office in spring 2007; his tenure ended at the end of July 2014. While building upon North Carolina's legacy, Syrett is taking a 21st-century approach to boost the global visibility of North Carolina's resources.

== Organization ==
=== Responsibilities ===
The North Carolina Film Office has 3 main responsibilities: market the State of North Carolina, serve the film industry, and serve the State of North Carolina. The office actively works to create a healthy climate in which to grow film industry economic development. A marketing agency as well, the film office educates the film industry on North Carolina's incentives program, promotes the state's infrastructure, and showcases North Carolina's diverse locations.

Projects (including film, television and commercial) are actively recruited and nurtured by the office. The office encourages industry-related companies to headquarter or have satellite companies in the state. The office ultimately serves the State of North Carolina by keeping and creating jobs in North Carolina for film crew and related businesses. As such, the film office must serve the film industry in an efficient and engaging capacity. The office hosts location scouts for producers and also provides on-the-ground assistance before and during filming. The North Carolina Film Office is the official liaison between the industry and state agencies for state property use, highway assistance, and other issues.

=== Regional film commissions ===
The North Carolina Film Office works in tandem with six affiliate offices that are both publicly and privately maintained. All are certified by the Association of Film Commissioners International.

- Charlotte Regional Film Commission
- Triangle Regional Film Commission
- Eastern North Carolina Regional Film Commission
- Piedmont-Triad Film Commission
- Western North Carolina Film Commission
- Wilmington Regional Film Commission, Inc.

=== Film Council ===
The North Carolina Film Office has a staff of 4. Until July 2014, the director of the North Carolina Film Office was Aaron Syrett (2007–2014). In addition to working with affiliate commissions, the North Carolina Film Office is also supported by a governor-appointed group who offer advice and guidance in the interest of North Carolina's film industry. Notable members include casting director, Craig Fincannon, founder of the Full Frame Documentary Film Festival, Nancy Buirski, and former president of Universal Pictures, Thom Mount. Studio executive Frank Capra Jr. was also a member of the council until his death in 2007.

== Film incentives program ==
1. As of January 2015, North Carolina has implemented a new Film and Entertainment Grant program. Funds from the $10 million grant will serve as a rebate of up to 25% on qualified expenses/purchases of productions.
2. The previous tax credit ended as of January 1, 2015, after the Republican-controlled NC legislature chose to let the film incentives legislation sunset as one piece of a larger plan to end most incentive funding, in favor of lower corporate income taxes.
3. Complete information on the new grant program is available at www.nccommerce.com/film.

== Notable films and television made in North Carolina ==
=== Alphabetically listed ===
- 28 Days
- A Walk to Remember
- Being There
- Blue Velvet
- Bull Durham
- The Butcher's Wife
- The Color Purple
- The Crow
- Dawson’s Creek
- Days of Thunder
- Dirty Dancing
- Divine Secrets of the Ya-Ya Sisterhood
- Dream a Little Dream
- Eastbound and Down
- Empire Records
- Firestarter
- Forrest Gump
- The Fugitive
- The Green Mile
- Hannibal
- Homeland
- The Hunt for Red October
- The Hunger Games
- I Know What You Did Last Summer
- Iron Man 3
- Junebug
- Kiss the Girls
- Last of the Mohicans
- Leatherheads
- Main Street
- The Marc Pease Experience
- Matlock
- Message in a Bottle
- Mr. Destiny
- Muppets from Space
- Nights in Rodanthe
- One Tree Hill
- Patch Adams
- Revolution
- Richie Rich
- Safe Haven
- The Secret Life of Bees
- Shallow Hal
- Sleeping with the Enemy
- Sleepy Hollow
- Surface
- Super Mario Brothers
- Talladega Nights: The Ballad of Ricky Bobby
- Teen Spirit
- Teenage Mutant Ninja Turtles
- Teenage Mutant Ninja Turtles II: The Secret of the Ooze
- To Gillian on Her 37th Birthday
- Under the Dome
- Weekend at Bernie's

== See also ==
- Category:Films shot in North Carolina
- Films and television shows produced in Wilmington, North Carolina
