= Raw Deal (1986 film) =

1986 film by John Irvin

- Theatrical release poster by John Alvin
- Directed by: John Irvin
- Screenplay by: Gary DeVore; Norman Wexler
- Story by: Luciano Vincenzoni; Sergio Donati
- Produced by: Martha Schumacher
- Starring: Arnold Schwarzenegger; Kathryn Harrold; Darren McGavin; Sam Wanamaker; Paul Shenar; Steven Hill; Ed Lauter
- Cinematography: Alex Thomson
- Edited by: Anne V. Coates
- Music by: Tom Bahler; Albhy Galuten; Chris Boardman
- Production company: International Film Corporation
- Distributed by: De Laurentiis Entertainment Group
- Release date: June 6, 1986
- Running time: 101 minutes
- Country: United States
- Language: English
- Budget: $8–10 million
- Box office: $16.2 million

Raw Deal is a 1986 American action film directed by John Irvin and written by Gary DeVore and Norman Wexler, from a story by Luciano Vincenzoni and Sergio Donati. It stars Arnold Schwarzenegger as Mark Kaminski, an ex-FBI agent turned North Carolina county sheriff, recruited by a former colleague to go undercover and destroy the Chicago Outfit. The cast also features Kathryn Harrold, Darren McGavin, Sam Wanamaker, Paul Shenar, Steven Hill and Ed Lauter.

The film was released in North America by De Laurentiis Entertainment Group on June 6, 1986. Raw Deal received mixed-to-negative reviews, and grossed $16.2 million in the US against its $8–10 million budget.

== Plot ==
A mob informant under FBI protection in a remote wood cabin is ambushed by a hit squad, who slaughter him and his bodyguards. One of the agents killed is Blair Shannon, the son of a senior FBI agent Harry Shannon, who vows to exact revenge.

Mark Kaminski, a county sheriff in rural North Carolina, lives with his alcoholic wife Amy, who resents their way of living. Kaminski was also an FBI agent who had brutally thrashed a suspect for sexually assaulting and murdering a young girl. Kaminski was given an option to "resign or be prosecuted" by Marvin Baxter, an ambitious prosecutor. Baxter sets up a committee to investigate the dealings of Luigi Patrovita, the strongest of the Chicago Outfit crime bosses.

Due to a leak within the FBI ranks causing their agents to be killed, Shannon recruits Kaminski for an unsanctioned assignment to infiltrate and dismantle Patrovita's organization. Kaminski fakes his death in an oil company explosion. He poses as Joseph P. Brenner, a convicted felon. He gets an audience with Patrovita's right-hand man Paulo Rocca and convinces them of his worth by harassing Martin Lamanski, a rival mob boss, who is trying to encroach on the territory of Patrovita. In Patrovita's casino, hidden in a basement level of a high-class hotel, Kaminski makes the acquaintance of Monique, who works for Rocca's top lieutenant, Max Keller.

Kaminski works his way into the good graces of the Patrovita family, devising a plan that recovers $100 million of heroin and cash seized by the feds from one of Patrovita's hideouts and assisting in Lamanski's assassination. Keller is not convinced that 'Brenner' is who he says and finds proof of the deception, showing Kaminski's photo to a police informant who previously arrested the real Brenner. The leak is revealed to be Baxter, who is forced to stay close to Patrovita. Kaminski accompanies Keller to a cemetery for a hit job but discovers that the target is Shannon, forcing him to blow his cover and kill Keller. In the ensuing shootout, Shannon is severely wounded and crippled.

Kaminski escapes with Monique's assistance and tells her to go to the airport and wait for him. After gathering guns and ammunition, he raids one of Patrovita's gravel pits, killing all of Patrovita's men and stealing a large amount of drug money. Kaminski sets off for Patrovita's casino, where he embarks on a killing spree, wiping out all his soldiers, including the men responsible for the murders of Blair and his fellow FBI agents. Rocca and Patrovita retreat to a back room, but Rocca is cut down by gunfire. Patrovita flees into an office, pleading for his life, but Kaminski guns him down. On his way out, Kaminski encounters Baxter and advises his ex-boss to choose trial or suicide. Baxter tries to shoot Kaminski in the back but is killed by the latter.

After driving to the airport, Kaminski hands a duffel bag containing $250,000 in cash to Monique, telling her that she can start a new life. He is reinstated with the FBI and reunites with a pregnant Amy. Kaminski then visits Shannon and asks him to be his child's godfather in exchange for completing physical therapy, which Shannon agrees to do.

== Cast ==
- Arnold Schwarzenegger as Mark Kaminski / Joseph P. Brenner
- Kathryn Harrold as Monique
- Darren McGavin as Harry Shannon
- Sam Wanamaker as Luigi "Lou" Patrovita
- Paul Shenar as Paulo Rocca
- Steven Hill as Martin "The Hammer" Lamanski
- Joe Regalbuto as Marvin Baxter
- Robert Davi as Max Keller
- Ed Lauter as Detective Baker
- Mordecai Lawner as Marcellino
- Blanche Baker as Amy Kaminski
- Victor Argo as Dangerous Man
- George P. Wilbur and Denver Mattson as Hitmen
- Steve Holt as Blair Shannon
- John Malloy as Trager
- Dick Durock as Dingo
- Thomas Rosales Jr. as Jesus
- Ralph Foody as Chicago PD Captain
- Lorenzo Clemons as Chicago PD Sergeant
- Leon Rippy as Casino Boss
- Robey as Lamanski's Girl
- Jery Hewitt as Stickman

== Production ==
=== Writing ===
The film was based on a script originally penned by Italian screenwriters Luciano Vincenzoni and Sergio Donati in the 1970s.

Editor Anne V. Coates said the film was called Triple Identity until

"Schwarzenegger wouldn’t assume the third identity, because it had something to do with his wife being unfaithful to him, in the film only, [laughs] and he said no woman would ever be unfaithful to him.... And the whole script was changed. And he never took on, he went back to his wife at the end instead of... He never came home and found her with another man like he did in the original script."

=== Filming ===
Principal photography began in Chicago in October 1985. Locations included the Warwick Allerton, Meigs Field, Navy Pier, the Palmer House Hilton, KAM Isaiah Israel Synagogue, and Union Station. The scenes at Patrovita's skyscraper officer were filmed at the Crain Communications Building.

Following two weeks of location shooting, production moved to Wilmington, North Carolina, where De Laurentiis Entertainment Group's studios were located (now Cinespace Wilmington). Locations included the Orton Plantation, Independence Mall, and Oleander Memorial Gardens. A scene set at a Chicago police station was filmed at the Murchison Building. The gravel pit shootout was filmed in nearby Castle Hayne.

== Reception ==
=== Box office ===
Raw Deal released in the United States on June 6, 1986, and made $5.4 million in its opening weekend. It went on to gross a total of $16.2 million in the United States. Despite turning a box office profit, its earnings were still considered a disappointment.

=== Critical response ===
Roger Ebert gave the film 1.5 stars out of four and wrote, "This plot is so simple (and has been told so many times before), that perhaps the most amazing achievement of Raw Deal is its ability to screw it up. This movie didn't just happen to be a mess; the filmmakers had to work to make it so confusing." Vincent Canby of The New York Times wrote that the film "isn't exactly Oscar material. It does nothing for the cause of nonviolence. It will warm the hearts of gun lobbyists everywhere, and its final body count may be even higher than that in Mr. Stallone's Cobra. Yet Raw Deal somehow manages to be measurably less offensive. At times, it's almost funny — intentionally." Todd McCarthy of Variety reported, "Comic book crime meller suffers from an irredeemably awful script, and even director John Irvin's engaging sense of how absurd the proceedings are can't work an alchemist's magic." Writing in the Los Angeles Times, Sheila Benson began, "Has it come to this? That we can feel vaguely cheered that Raw Deal (citywide), where the bodies again pile up like cordwood, is a better made movie than Cobra?" However, she praised Schwarzenegger, saying that his strength as an actor is "not that he can toss grown men over ceiling beams, but that he has a vein of sweetness and self-deprecation that no amount of mayhem can obliterate ... it has shone from him since Pumping Iron, it has allowed him to surmount silly and unwise pieces of action (such as the drunk scenes in one of the Conans and here), and even his own awkwardness as an actor." Gene Siskel of the Chicago Tribune gave the film 1 star out of 4 and noted that it had "essentially the same story" as Cobra, "but it is told with so many superfluous characters that we're never really sure whose side a few key people are on. Needless to say, in a film filled with punch-outs, we very quickly don't care." Paul Attanasio of The Washington Post dismissed the film as "a mostly tedious, cheaply made shoot-em-up" that "recycles the clichés that have long been the cud of television cop dramas." Pauline Kael of The New Yorker called it "reprehensible and enjoyable, the kind of movie that makes you feel brain dead after two minutes—after which point you're ready to laugh at its mixture of trashiness, violence, and startlingly silly crude humor."

John Nubbin reviewed Raw Deal for Different Worlds magazine and stated that "Although the picture begins with a set of great hooks which drag the audience in immediately and completely, it isn't long before the twists in logic start to ruin everyone's good time. Coupling this with the needlessly foolish villains, the totally inept marksman they hire to protect them, and the godawful bits of story such as Schwarzenegger going to kill a man simply to get in good with the mobs, or his healing of the sick in the movie's incredibly maudlin ending, you have just another ready-mix, non-varying formula movie, the kind people are, luckily, going to see less and less of as the years drag by."

Raw Deal holds a score of 31% on review aggregator Rotten Tomatoes, based on 16 reviews with an average rating of 4.6/10. On Metacritic, the film has a weighted average score of 44 out of 100 based on 12 reviews, indicating "mixed or average reviews". Audiences polled by CinemaScore gave the film an average grade of "B" on an A+ to F scale.

== Release ==
=== Home Media ===
Raw Deal was released on DVD by 20th Century Fox Home Entertainment on June 20, 2003 as a Region 1 widescreen DVD in the EU by studio Canal with a remastered picture and 5.1 remix.

The first Blu-ray release was June 28, 2010 by Paramount Home Entertainment as a multi-region widescreen Blu-ray.

The 4K Blu-ray release was on October 2022.

== See also ==
- List of American films of 1986
- Arnold Schwarzenegger filmography
