= Orton Plantation =

Historic house in North Carolina, United States

- U.S. National Register of Historic Places
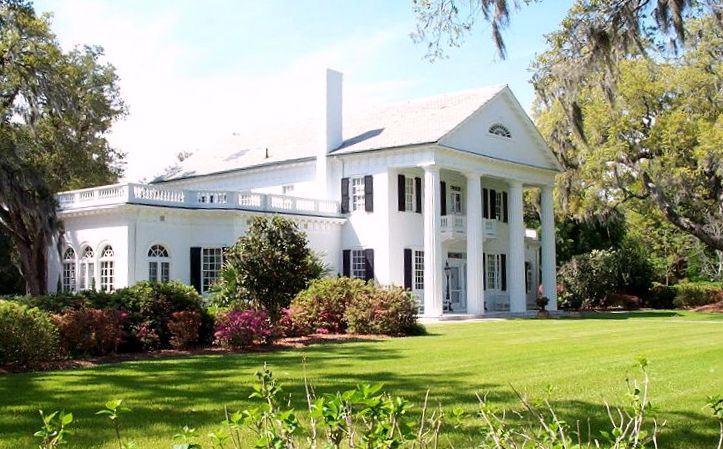
- Orton House

- Location within North Carolina Location within the United States
- Location: 9149 Orton Rd SE, Winnabow, North Carolina
- Coordinates: 34°3′38″N 77°56′47″W
- Area: 12 acres (4.9 ha)
- Built: 1735
- Architectural style: Classical Revival; Greek Revival
- NRHP reference No.: 73001294
- Added to NRHP: April 11, 1973

The Orton Plantation is a historic plantation house in Smithville Township in Brunswick County, North Carolina, United States. Located beside the Cape Fear River between Wilmington and Southport, Orton Plantation is considered to be a near-perfect example of Southern antebellum architecture. Built in 1735 by the co-founder of Brunswick Town, Colonel Maurice Moore, the Orton Plantation house is one of the oldest structures in Brunswick County. During its history Orton Plantation has been attacked by Native Americans, used as a military hospital, and been home to lawyers, physicians, military leaders, and a Colonial governor.

On April 11, 1973, the Orton Plantation was added to the National Register of Historic Places.

The Orton Plantation Gardens and family-owned chapel were open to the public until 2010, when the plantation was sold to Louis Moore Bacon, a direct decedent of the original builder.

== History ==
In 1725, Roger Moore, son of Governor James Moore and grandson of Irish nobleman Sir Rory Moore, and his family moved from the South Carolina to an area of land known as Orton in southeastern North Carolina. Orton was owned by Roger's brother, Colonel Maurice Moore, father of General James Moore and Maurice Moore Jr., author of a famous essay denouncing the Stamp Act of 1765. The elder Maurice was also the grandfather of Supreme Court Associate Justice Alfred Moore. Maurice sold the land to his brother when Roger moved to the area and together they founded Brunswick Town one mile (1.6 km) south of Orton.

The first home Roger built in 1725 was destroyed by local Native Americans. Roger constructed the current Orton Plantation home in 1735 and developed his land into a leading rice plantation with the unpaid labor of hundreds of slaves. Orton remained in the Moore family until it was purchased by Benjamin Smith, who eventually lost ownership and was forced to auction off the home and surrounding 4,975 acres (2,013 ha). The property was purchased by a physician, Frederick Jones Hill, in 1826. According to a reward advertisement for runaway slaves in the June 17, 1861 edition of the Fayetteville Semi-Weekly Observer (Fayetteville, North Carolina), the plantation was owned by Thomas C. Miller during 1861. He had apparently purchased the plantation and the slaves thereon from Dr. Hill. Following the Confederate defeat at Fort Fisher, Union soldiers confiscated Orton Plantation and used the home as a military hospital, thus sparing it from destruction. Orton Plantation was abandoned after the War and the house sat empty for 19 years.

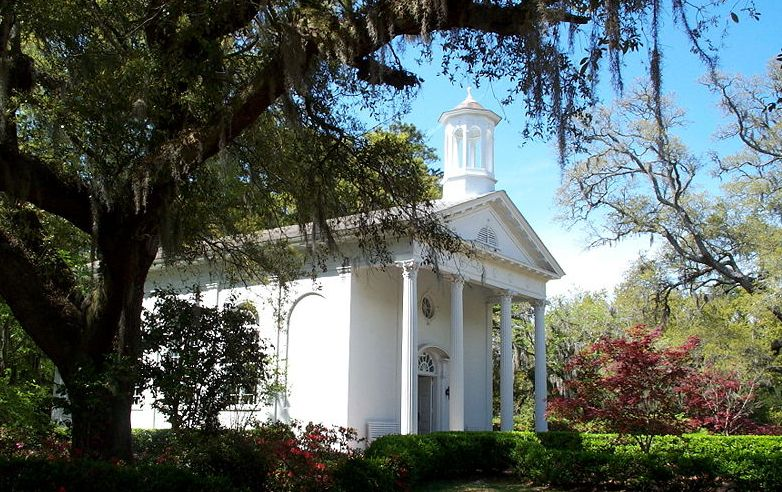
Luola's Chapel

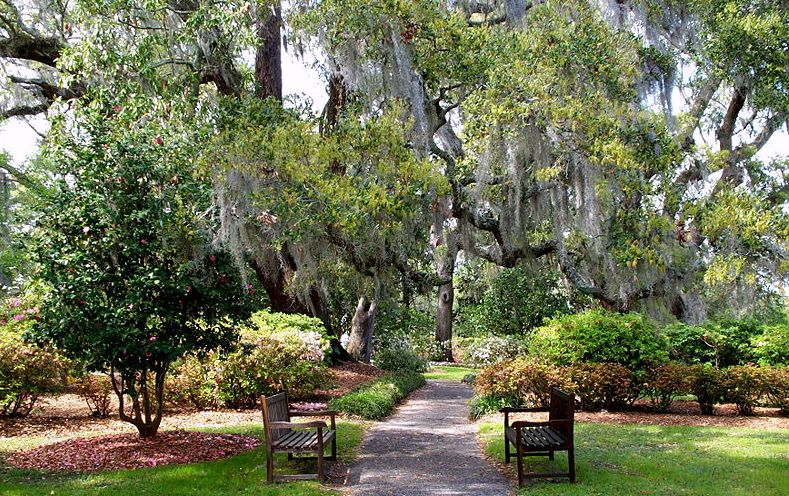
Orton Plantation Gardens

In 1884, Orton Plantation was purchased by a former Confederate military officer, Kenneth MacKenzie Murchison. Murchison restored the plantation to its original appearance and made it his winter home. When Murchison died in 1904, Orton Plantation was purchased by his son-in-law and daughter, James and Luola Sprunt. James, a lawyer, encouraged his wife to remodel the home and in 1910 he and Luola began the development of a flower garden and expansion of the house. The Sprunts constructed a family chapel in 1915, and when his wife died the following year from scarlet fever, James renamed the building to Luola's Chapel in her honor. At approximately the same time, their son, James Laurence Sprunt, lost his first wife, Amoret Cameron Price giving birth to their first son, James Laurence Sprunt Jr.

In the 1930s, James Laurence Sprunt and his second wife Annie enlarged the garden to its current size of 20 acres (8.1 ha), with some of the landscape design done by Robert Sturtevant. After a relative was involved in an automobile accident, the Sprunts opened their garden to the public in hopes of raising money for medical expenses. Charging 25 cents for an entrance fee, the family raised $1,000 in a week. From that point on, the Sprunts decided to keep the garden open to the public. In 1954, the Sprunt family donated 114.5 acres (46.3 ha) of the Orton Plantation to establish the Brunswick Town State Historic Site. Four years later, James Laurence Sprunt wrote a book about the history of Orton Plantation entitled The Story of Orton Plantation. After the death of Laurence Sprunt in 1973 and Annie Gray Sprunt in 1978, the ownership was shared by their four sons: James Laurence Sprunt Jr., Kenneth Murchison, Samuel Nash, and Laurence Gray Sprunt. Kenneth succeeded Bragaw as manager of the gardens after World War II until 2006 when Laurence bought the gardens from his brothers and continued the management. Ownership of the Orton Plantation was passed down to each generation of the Sprunt family for 126 years.

Prior to 2010, the Orton Plantation was a tourist attraction, with the gardens and chapel open to the public. The old rice fields became a wildlife sanctuary and the plantation was a haven for birdwatchers. Weddings, family reunions, corporate events, and school fieldtrips took place at the property.

The Laurence Sprunt family sold Orton Plantation for $45 million in May 2010 to Louis Moore Bacon, a hedge fund manager and direct descendant of Roger Moore, builder of the original Orton home in 1725. Since the purchase, the plantation and grounds have been closed to the general public.

Bacon reportedly planned to restore the house and renovate the grounds. He is said to have spent a significant amount on restoration and research. 4000 acres of forest were burned in 2012 as part of the project. He wanted to grow rice on the land by 2014 for the first time since 1931. Because the fields are wetlands this requires a permit from the United States Army Corps of Engineers. Bacon also wanted the National Registry designation to include the rice fields, and for the plantation to become a National Historic Landmark.

== Architecture ==
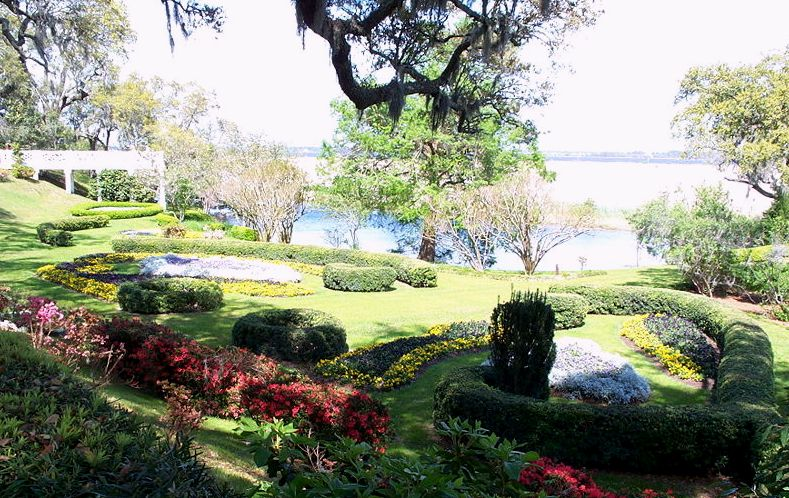
Orton Plantation Gardens overlooking the Cape Fear River

The Orton Plantation house is an example of Classical Revival and Greek Revival architecture. Originally a 1 1/2-story white brick building, a second floor was added to the house in 1840 along with four fluted Doric columns. Two wings were added to the house in 1904. A corbelled brick chimney is located on each side of the original section of the home.

Similar to the house, Luola's Chapel is a white brick structure with four Doric columns. The chapel is surrounded by gardens and features a small steeple. A pavilion is located near the chapel.

Orton Plantation Gardens contains 20 acres (81,000 m^{2}) of lawns and formal gardens, as well as 60 acres (24 ha) of fountains, statues, forests, lagoons, old rice fields, and a family cemetery. The garden features tree-lined brick paths and rows of camellias, dogwoods, magnolias, crape-myrtles, annuals, and perennials. The front gates of the property are topped with cement eagles which lead to a dirt path driveway lined with large oak trees draped in Spanish moss that were planted in the 18th century.

== Popular culture ==
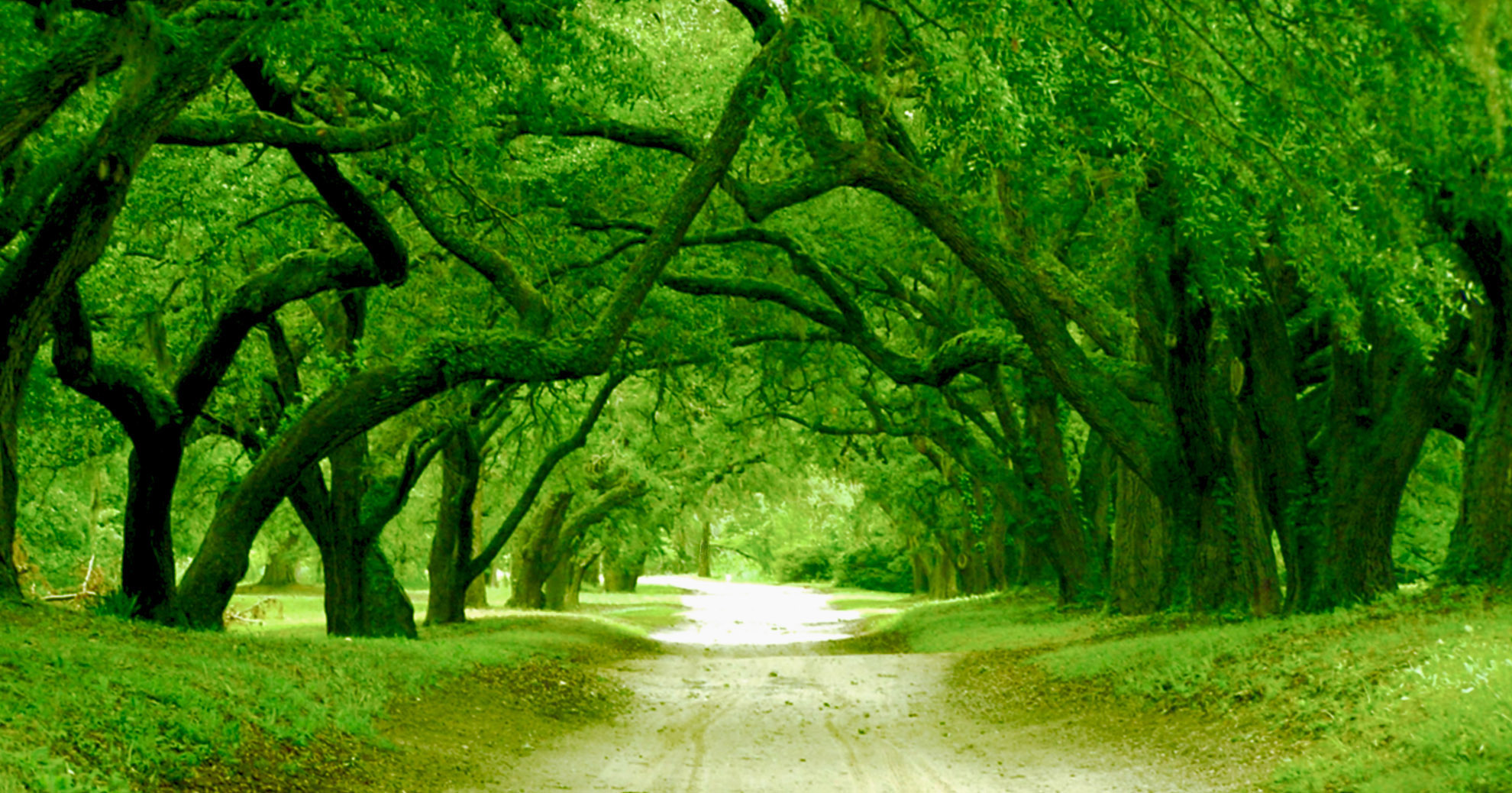
Orton Plantation driveway

In 1983, American movie producer Frank Capra, Jr. searched for a location to film a scene for his movie Firestarter and chose Orton Plantation. Afterwards, Capra Jr. convinced movie producer Dino De Laurentiis to open a studio in nearby Wilmington. Laurentiis founded the De Laurentiis Entertainment Group which brought additional opportunities for movie and television filming at the Orton Plantation.

Since 1983, Orton Plantation has been featured in 23 films and 34 television movies and series. Some of the movies that feature scenes from Orton Plantation include Lolita, Divine Secrets of the Ya-Ya Sisterhood, Hounddog, and A Walk to Remember. Television series that have filmed scenes at Orton Plantation include One Tree Hill, Dawson's Creek, Hart of Dixie and Matlock.

== See also ==
- List of plantations
- National Register of Historic Places listings in North Carolina
- List of the oldest buildings in North Carolina
