= Frank Capra (disambiguation) =

Frank Capra (1897–1991) was an Academy Award-winning Italian-American film director.

Frank Capra may also refer to:

- Frank Capra Jr. (1934–2007), film studio executive and son of the aforementioned Frank Capra

== See also ==
- Francis Capra (born 1983), actor in Veronica Mars and Crank
