= Chicago film industry =

Film industry in the US city of Chicago

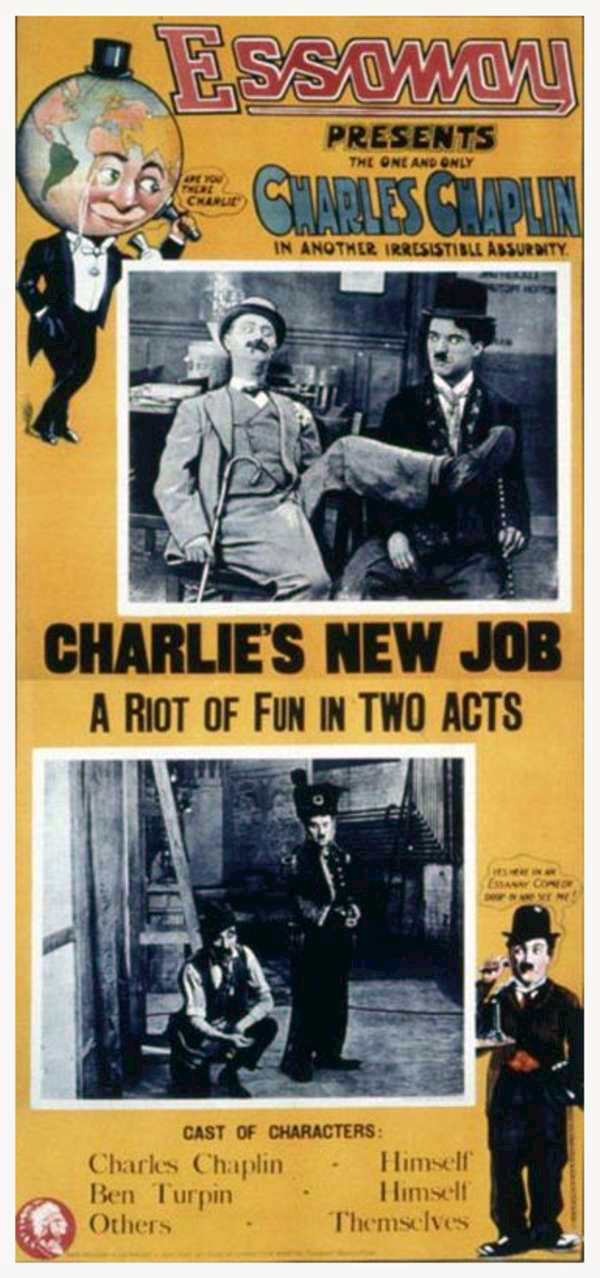
Advertisement for His New Job featuring Charlie Chaplin

The Chicago film industry is a central hub for motion picture production and exhibition that was established before Hollywood became the undisputed capital of film making. In the early 1900s, Chicago boasted the greatest number of production companies and filmmakers. Essanay Studios founded by George K. Spoor was one of the earliest successful studios to produce movies in Chicago, employing stars such as Charlie Chaplin and Gloria Swanson. Actor and co-founder of Essanay Studios, Broncho Billy Anderson gave birth to the western genre. Early film companies such as Essanay Studios produced multiple silent films every week and rented viewing equipment to showcase the latest cinematography to the public. This rental culture gave birth to the popularity of Nickelodeons up until the Great Depression. However, due to the high demand for motion pictures during this time, a black market for films and equipment developed. The Motion Picture Patents Company, established in 1909 as a conglomerate of the major studios, sought to eliminate all illegal use of patented film equipment. As a result, independent ventures entered the film scene. Independents drove the film industry to the west to avoid legal trouble with the trust of major film companies united under the Motion Picture Patents Company. The west offered fairer weather and scenery that better accommodated film making. Not until the 1980s and early 21st century has Chicago experienced a film production revival. Blockbusters, such as Blues Brothers, Sixteen Candles, and The Dark Knight, have rejuvenated the Chicago film scene.

In the 21st century, Chicago further experienced a film revival due to a tax bill the state of Illinois passed to give filmmakers a 30% tax break on production costs.

== Beginnings of the Chicago film industry ==
One early Chicago producer was William N. Selig, who formed the Mutoscope & Film Company in Chicago in 1896 and renamed it the Selig Polyscope Company the following year. In 1901, Selig made more than sixty short industrial films for Armour and Company, documenting operations at the company's Chicago meatpacking plant.

=== Essanay Studios ===
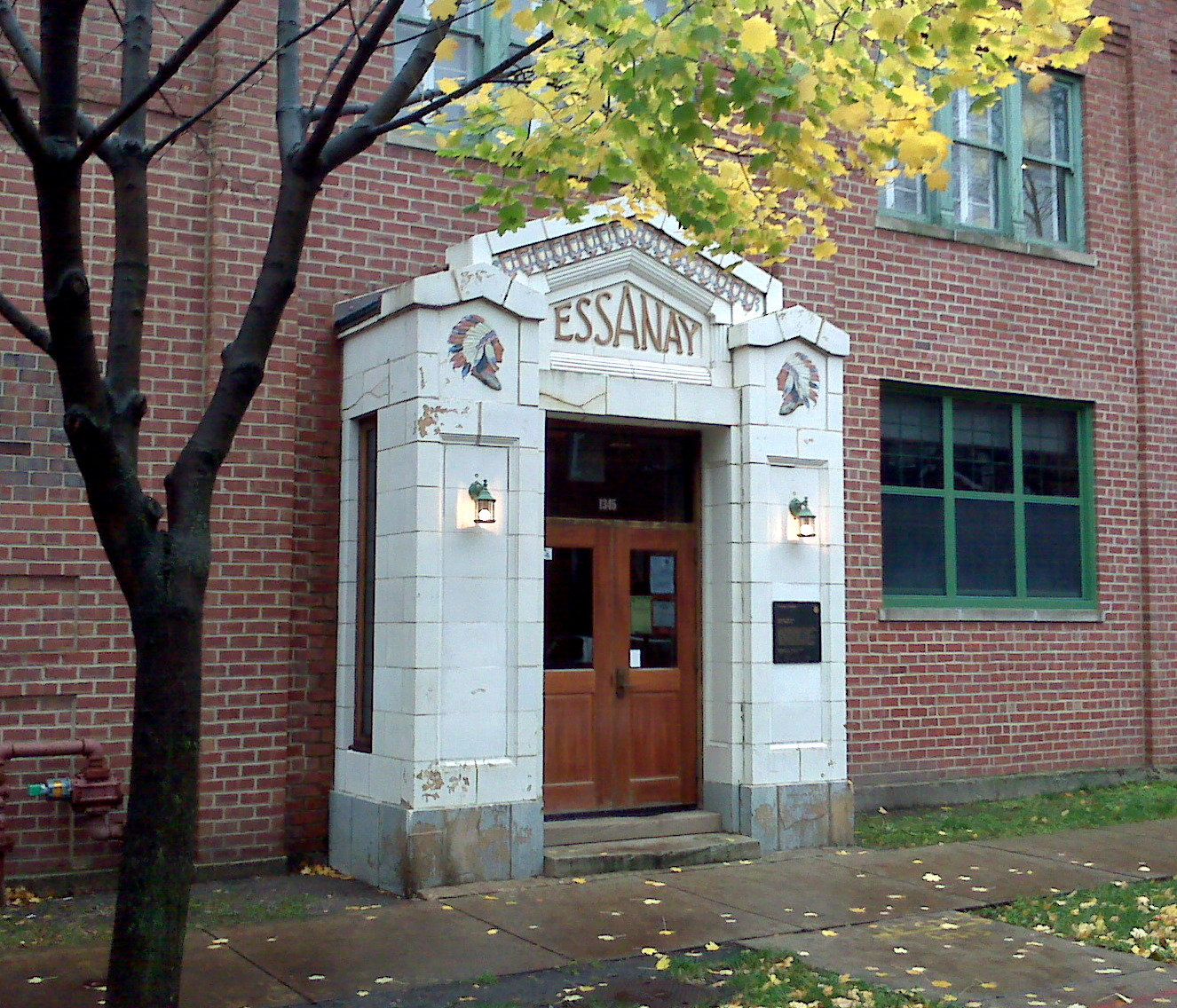
Essanay Studio

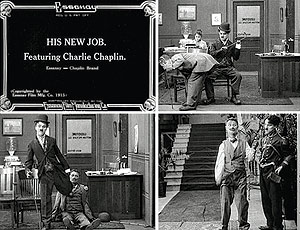
His New Job featuring Charlie Chaplin at Essanay Studios, Chicago

Essanay Studios was a Chicago pioneer film company established in 1907 by George K. Spoor and Broncho Billy Anderson. Originally named the Peerless Film Manufacturing Company, Spoor and Anderson changed the name to Essanay by combining the first two letters of their surnames. Located on the north side on Argyle Street in Chicago, the firm grew to one of the largest film companies in the world before the rise of Hollywood.

The success of Essanay Studio was based on Spoor's and Anderson's appetite for innovation. Spoor was intrigued by Edison's Kinetoscope at the 1893 World's Columbian Exposition but thought the invention could be improved. Armed with a vision, Spoor created the Magniscope, which allowed films to be projected onto flat surfaces. Spoor and Anderson installed, operated, and rented the Magniscope to many theaters around Chicago. The Magniscope innovation would eventually create legal battles between Essanay and the Edison Company and end up with the creation of the Motion Picture Patents Company. Anderson's film prowess came from on-screen achievement. He acted in the production of The Great Train Robbery, and became one of the first western stars. His nickname became, "Broncho Billy", for his involvement with western films. Due to his love for westerns, Anderson convinced Spoor to establish Essanay branches in Boulder, Colorado and Fremont California. These locations were perfect, especially the California location, because of the steady climate and mountainous landscape.

Essanay Studios in Chicago was the capital of Chicago film in the first decades of the 1900s. Charlie Chaplin started his career in 1915 at Essanay Studios. He was hired in 1915 and paid $1,250.00 per week. Chaplin improvised the scripts that were given to him by adding slapstick humor. Ben Turpin, fellow actor for Essanay, and Chaplin worked together on slapstick projects. Turpin was cross-eyed which made him a natural sidekick to the antics of Chaplin. Chaplin's only full feature production at Essanay was called His New Job. Another notable actress who found a beginning at Essanay Studio was Gloria Swanson. Swanson would later star in many television and film productions including the smash hit Sunset Boulevard.

Despite booming success under Charlie Chaplin, Essanay Studios soon faced a downturn. Chaplin did not like Chicago due to unpredictable weather conditions. After only one month of work, Chaplin left Chicago to head west. Spoor and Anderson soon hired French comedian, Max Linder, to take the role of Chaplin. Linder's wry humor was not appreciated by the Chicago audiences. The company suffered economically due to the inability to produce a popular film. In 1918 George Kleine purchased the studio to form a merger between Vitagraph, Lubin, Selig, and Essanay known as V-L-S-E, Incorporated which would eventually be absorbed by Warner Brothers. The Essanay location would eventually be taken over by industrial film producer, Norman Wilding. Currently, the remnants of the studio are part of St. Augustine's College which built a Charlie Chaplin memorial theater on site.

=== Motion Picture Patents Company ===
The rise of the Chicago film industry in the early 1900s was a product of technological advancement marked by political strategy.

In 1889, Thomas Edison and William Dickson patented the Kinetoscope. The Kinetoscope allowed a single viewer to watch a film reel through a small window. At this time, Edison did not see any practical value to the Kinetoscope and dismissed the invention as a toy. However, aspiring filmmakers began designing and patenting similar projection machines around the Kinetoscope that allowed a film to be shown to a large audience. William Selig and George K. Spoor of Essanay Studios in Chicago, the Biograph Company, and Vitagraph Company all improvised Edison's work. Film companies of this time period customarily both created movies and established a means of viewing.

Despite initial ignorance to the Kinetoscope, the Edison Manufacturing Company responded to this innovation with legal action. According to the company, film outfits were showing motion pictures illegally because each of the improvised projectors violated the Kinetoscope patent. However, each film outfit had its own patent protection connected with individual innovations. Concurrent formation of a black market for projection equipment exacerbated legal issues. Following legal proceedings, the Motion Picture Patents Company was established on January 1, 1909. This coalition established a trust of the major film outfits in the United States. Firms from Chicago included in the Motion Picture Patents Company were the Vitagraph Company, the Selig Polyscope Company, the Kleine Company, and Essanay Studios. Provisions restricted movie making to these licensed firms. The trust also required outfits to pay the Edison Company royalties for use of the improvised projection equipment. To snuff out competitors, a rental system was put in place. Individuals operating theaters were now required to pay a $2 per week rental for films and projection equipment.

=== The Chicago independents push back ===
Exhibitors and filmmakers who refused to pay the newly instituted fees were not stopped by this new legislation. Independent companies were formed outside of this trust almost immediately. Max Lewis, president of the Chicago Film Exchange, announced he would not comply with the $10 monthly licensing fee on projectors. Within 48 hours of the formation of the MPPC, a Chicago-based combine of independents, the International Projecting and Producing Company (IPPC), formed to counter the MPPC's stranglehold. The IPPC, headed by the John J. Murdoch, general manager of the Western Vaudeville Managers' Association, dramatically announced the firm's formation with a $2 million base in the February 6, 1909 issue of Show World magazine.

Individuals risked their own livelihood by operating independently. The major companies in the trust could sue any of these firms for violation of patent rights.

== Boom of the Chicago film industry ==
=== 1900s ===
An Advertisement for a western produced by Essanay founder, Brocho Billy Anderson

Chicago became a leader in motion pictures with innovative trailblazers and an interested public. In 1907, Chicago had more theaters per capita than any other city in the United States. Nickelodeons or five-cent theaters became extremely popular with the number of venues growing each year until the Great Depression. These theaters quenched the public's thirst for film and created solid neighborhood relations.

Revolutionary in Chicago's film industry was the establishment of rental houses or film exchanges; in 1907, Chicago had more than 15 film exchange houses, such as The Stereopticon & Film Exchange, William Swanson & Company, Chicago Projecting Company, and the International Projecting and Producing Company, formed by JJ Murdoch as an independent Chicago-based exchange. These rental houses allowed exhibitors to borrow films at a reduced cost than actually purchasing them. This movement revolutionized motion picture viewership. It allowed patrons access to a wide array of films. The average viewer could now experience a variety of film disciplines for a small consumer cost. Rental houses also enabled theaters to change films frequently, keeping the film consumer interested. Chicago quickly became the leading film distribution market in the entire United States with control of 80% of the market in the early 1900s.

Movie production also boomed. Production companies, like the Essanay Studios and the Selig Polyscope Company, dominated the film landscape. These two firms employed hundreds of people and churned out hundreds of films every year. Filmmakers shot their films outdoors due to the need for ample lighting with the primitive camera equipment. Sets took up entire city blocks at a time. The banks of the Chicago River were often used as a set for the westerns Anderson trademarked. Motion pictures were valued differently in the early era of film. Modern films are highly valued with vast amounts of resources being poured into the production value. In the early 1900s, films were viewed as products with a studio releasing multiple films per week.

== Decline of the Chicago film industry ==
=== 1920s ===
The Chicago film industry met decline for a combination of reasons. The Motion Picture Patents Company, established to protect the major players in the industry, actually promoted the birth of independent ventures. These ventures sought to circumvent payment to the companies united under the Motion Picture Patents Company trust. Independent firms granted creative license to the actor and often competed with the major firms despite the significantly lower budget. To avoid litigation by the Motion Picture Patents Company for patent violation, many independent firms moved west, literally out of the reach of the major production companies.

== Revival ==
=== 1920s to present ===
Despite the transition from Chicago to Hollywood in the 1920s, Chicago remained on the map. Citizens retained an insatiable appetite for motion pictures, even though production had left the city. Chicago boasted the largest chain of theaters during the studio era (1919–1952). The Balaban and Katz chain, once small west-side exhibitors, bloomed their business into a citywide phenomena. Balaban and Katz owned movie and stage palaces such as the Chicago Theatre, Ford Center for the Performing Arts Oriental Theatre, and Balaban and Katz Uptown Theatre. High-profile film companies such as MGM, Columbia Pictures, Warner Brothers, Republic, Universal, RKO, and Paramount all held offices in Chicago.

Movie production again entered Chicago in the 1980s with the state of Illinois becoming a leader in money spent on film production. Notable films from the 1980s include Ferris Bueller's Day Off, The Color of Money, Risky Business, The Untouchables, Planes, Trains and Automobiles, and When Harry Met Sally.... Feature film directors returned to the city including Dan Aykroyd and the Belushi family (Blues Brothers, About Last Night, and Blues Brothers 2000), John Hughes (Sixteen Candles and The Breakfast Club), and Andrew Davis (The Fugitive and Chain Reaction).

Chicago further fostered its new production boom with the passage of an Illinois bill in 2009. This bill provides a 30% tax credit on all production costs within the state of Illinois. Since instituting this law in 2009, many filmmakers have committed to Chicago for production. Recent films with Chicago as a filming location include Transformers: Dark of the Moon, Contagion, and Source Code. The new bill is supposed to benefit Chicago with increased tax revenue from $70 million in 2009 to $100 million in 2010.

In 2011, Nick Mirkopoulos, founder of Cinespace Studios in Toronto, launched Cinespace Chicago Film Studios with his nephew Alex Pissios a Chicago native. The two chose to collaborate on a similar production facility in Chicago. They purchased the former Ryerson Steel complex in 2011 and the more than 60 acres in the North Lawndale neighborhood became Cinespace Chicago Film Studios, the largest independent movie studio outside of Los Angeles.

Cinespace houses 35 sound stages, dozens of production offices and support spaces as well as numerous production tenants that offer equipment, casting services, post-production houses, a 3D animation company, plus camera and lighting rentals and sales. Since its inception, Cinespace has brought in more than 3 billion dollars in film-related spending.

Cinespace Chicago Film Studios, is the “Hollywood of the Midwest,” and has brought a multitude of digital media employment and education opportunities to the community and region by revitalizing a depressed neighborhood, and contributing to the creation of more than 15,000 jobs. Alex Pissios' leadership at Cinespace Chicago has been instrumental in infusing billions of dollars of revenue into the city and the state of Illinois.

Cinespace Chicago has been the nexus for over 40 major productions, including the films Transformers, Divergent, and Batman v Superman: Dawn of Justice; various productions from Amazon, HBO and Netflix; and TV shows Empire and Shameless, as well as producer Dick Wolf’s “Chicago franchise” Chicago Fire, Chicago Med, and Chicago PD.

== See also ==
- Category:Essanay Studios films
