= Gary DeVore =

American screenwriter (1941–1997)

- Born: Gary Martin DeVore; September 17, 1941; Los Angeles, California, U.S.
- Died: June 28, 1997 (aged 55); Palmdale, California, U.S.
- Occupation: Screenwriter
- Spouses: Maria Cole (m. 1969; div. 1978) Sandie Newton (m. 1981; div. 1985) Claudia Christian (m. 1988; div. 1992) Wendy Oates (m. 1996)

Gary Martin DeVore (September 17, 1941 – last seen June 28, 1997) was an American screenwriter. He wrote several commercially successful action films in the 1980s and '90s, and is also known for the mysterious circumstances of his 1997 death. DeVore disappeared without explanation, and his remains were found in his vehicle a year later. Autopsy could not establish a cause or manner of death, but investigators believe he most likely fell asleep while driving, lost control of his vehicle and drowned.

== Early career ==
DeVore began his writing career in the late 1960s, on shows like Chuck Barris' The Newlywed Game, The Steve Allen Show, and Tempo.

== Personal life, death, and aftermath ==
DeVore married the singer Maria Cole (1969–1978) and the actresses Sandie Newton (1981–1985), Claudia Christian (1988–1992), and Wendy Oates (1996–1997). Briefly, he worked as vice president of production at De Laurentiis Entertainment Group (DEG), before returning to work on films with a three-picture agreement at DEG.

DeVore disappeared in June 1997, while driving at night from Santa Fe, New Mexico to Santa Barbara, California, prompting an extensive search and media speculation. DeVore had been working in his office in Santa Fe trying to finish a script. DeVore had recently complained of writer's block, and so had decided to change his environment. When he finally finished the script, DeVore decided to drive home through the Mojave Desert. His wife Wendy was waiting for him at their beachfront house in Carpinteria, California. When she did not hear from him, she decided to call around 1 am (it was later discovered the call had not been recorded by the telephone company). He answered, but was not very specific on his location. This was the last time Wendy spoke with him.

A year later, he and his Ford Explorer were discovered submerged below a bridge over the aqueduct in Palmdale, California. After police had retrieved the vehicle from the water, it was found that his laptop containing the script (titled The Big Steal) was missing, as was his gun. DeVore's hands were missing; hand bones were found nearby but could not be conclusively identified as DeVore's. The discovery of DeVore's vehicle was considered suspicious, as the aqueduct was searched shortly after his disappearance was reported and nothing unusual was discovered. Police concluded that for DeVore to crash his vehicle in this location meant that he would have had to have driven 3 mi (4.8 km) against traffic without being seen. This would have been doubly difficult because the vehicle's lights were not switched on.

== Filmography ==
=== Film ===
| Year | Title | Writer | Producer |
|---|---|---|---|
| 1980 | The Dogs of War | Yes | No |
| 1981 | Back Roads | Yes | No |
| 1986 | Running Scared | Yes | No |
| 1986 | Raw Deal | Yes | No |
| 1988 | Traxx | Yes | Yes |
| 1994 | Pentathlon | Yes | No |

=== Uncredited revisions ===
- The Mean Season (1985)
- Showdown in Little Tokyo (1991)
- Passenger 57 (1992)
- Time Cop (1994)
- Sudden Death (1995)
- The Relic (1997)

=== Unrealized projects ===
- Betrayals - A screenplay adaptation of a novel by Brian Freemantle
- Deadlocked
- Doin' Fine
- Father of the Year
- The Good Fight
- Happy Trails
- Hard Knox - A story about a retired detective who investigates the death of his son. Sidney Poitier was slated to star in the film.
- Hard Rock aka Bloodshot - A project about a has been, drunk detective who is the only salvation for a young man on the run. Project would’ve been directed by Devore and produced by Linda Gottlieb.
- Hole in the Sky
- Honorable Men - A crime drama that would’ve been produced by Ryan R. Johnson, and directed by Tony Kaye.
- Hoops
- Hurricane Chaser - A project that would’ve starred Christopher Lambert.
- The Search for Joseph Tully
- Just Maybe
- Legion
- The Lights
- Loudmouth
- Mazeltov
- Naked Heroes
- Portrait of Death
- Rawhide
- The Ballad of Seattle Slew
- Shut Down
- Solo - An adaptation of the Jack Higgins novel of the same name that Harold Becker was slated to direct.
- Spare Parts - A story about a cop and an INS officer investigating the black market selling of body parts and their donors, project would’ve been produced by David Foster and Lawrence Turman for Paramount Pictures.
- Spittin' in the Wind
- Stealth - A film project about the development of the F-117 Stealth Bomber.
- Straight Poole
- Too Late to Die
- Wish You Were Here - A Vietnam story featuring a photojournalist and a thirteen-year-old kid searching for his MIA father. Kathleen Turner was to star in the project.

=== Television ===
| Year | TV Series | Credit | Notes |
|---|---|---|---|
| 1967-72 | The Newlywed Game | Writer | |
| 1967-72 | The Steve Allen Show | Producer | |
| 1967-72 | Tempo | Writer, Producer | |
| 1973 | Golf for Swingers | Creator | |
| 1983 | Heart of Steel | Writer, Executive Producer | TV Movie |
| 1988 | CBS Summer Playhouse | Writer, Executive Producer | Episode: The Heat |

== See also ==
- List of solved missing person cases: 1950–1999
- List of unsolved deaths
