= Date with an Angel =

1987 film by Tom McLoughlin

- Theatrical release poster
- Directed by: Tom McLoughlin
- Written by: Tom McLoughlin
- Produced by: Martha Schumacher
- Starring: Michael E. Knight; Phoebe Cates; Emmanuelle Béart; David Dukes
- Cinematography: Alex Thomson
- Edited by: Marshall Harvey
- Music by: Randy Kerber
- Production company: De Laurentiis Film Partners
- Distributed by: De Laurentiis Entertainment Group
- Release date: November 20, 1987
- Running time: 105 minutes
- Country: United States
- Language: English
- Budget: $8 million
- Box office: $2 million

Date with an Angel is a 1987 American romantic fantasy comedy film written and directed by Tom McLoughlin, and starring Michael E. Knight, Phoebe Cates, Emmanuelle Béart, and David Dukes. The film follows an aspiring composer (Knight) who discovers an angel (Béart) with a broken wing in his swimming pool, while having to deal with his jealous fiancée (Cates).

The original music score was composed by Randy Kerber. The visual effects were produced at Boss Film Studios under the supervision of Richard Edlund.

== Plot ==
Aspiring composer Jim Sanders is engaged to Patty Winston, the spoiled daughter of Ed Winston, who owns a cosmetics company. On the night of the couple's engagement party, three masked robbers kidnap Jim and escape in a car. The kidnappers are revealed to be Jim's best friends, George, Don, and Rex, who drive him back to his apartment for his bachelor party. Later, after passing out drunk, Jim awakens to find an angel lying unconscious in his swimming pool. He takes the Angel inside and revives her with mouth-to-mouth resuscitation. The Angel is unable to speak, only communicating in coos and high-pitched squeals. As they find that her right wing is broken, she kisses Jim.

The next morning, George, Don, and Rex discover the Angel at Jim's apartment and suggest exploiting her for profit, but Jim strongly opposes it. Shortly after Jim sews up the Angel's broken wing, Patty arrives at his apartment, but seeing the Angel wrapped in a blanket, she assumes Jim is having an affair and angrily leaves. That night, he takes the Angel to a fast-food restaurant, where she develops a taste for French fries. While Jim leaves to call Patty from a payphone, unsuccessfully trying to make amends, his friends attempt to lure the Angel into their car with French fries, before he chases them away and takes her back home. There, Ed arrives and confronts Jim, but upon looking at the Angel's face, he becomes enchanted by her and leaves.

The next day, due to the failure of his company's latest campaign, Ed sets out to replace Patty with the Angel as the company's spokesperson, which further infuriates Patty. Meanwhile, Jim's friends devise a scheme to capture the Angel by arranging for him to meet Patty over a reconciliation. When Jim arrives with the Angel, Patty storms out and he follows, whereupon his friends kidnap the Angel and drive away. The next day, as the trio reveals a bound and gagged Angel to a press conference, Jim comes to her rescue and takes her to his old treehouse in the woods.

While hiding out, Jim tells the Angel that his father got him interested in music, but six months earlier, he began to suffer from severe headaches that caused him to stop composing. Jim and the Angel then share a dance to one of his compositions. After removing the bandage from the Angel's wing, Jim advises her to leave before the others find her. As the Angel disappears, an increasingly unhinged Patty arrives and slaps Jim, prompting an invisible Angel to punch and kick Patty. Jim's parents and Ed arrive, as do George, Don, and Rex. Amid the chaos, the Angel reappears and drives away Patty and Ed with rain clouds, before disappearing into the sky.

The others notice that Jim has collapsed and rush him to a hospital, where the doctor divulges that his headaches are caused by a brain tumor in an advanced stage. When the Angel appears in Jim's hospital room, he is convinced that she has come to take him to heaven. She kisses him, and as he falls asleep, she wraps her wings around him. Shortly after George, Don, and Rex walk in to check on Jim, the Angel—now a nurse who can speak—assures them that she has it "on the highest authority" that Jim will be around for a long time. As Jim awakens, the Angel tells him that she has been granted a leave of absence for good behavior, allowing them to be together. She tells him she is craving French fries, before they embrace and kiss.

== Cast ==
- Michael E. Knight as Jim Sanders
- Phoebe Cates as Patty Winston
- Emmanuelle Béart as Angel
- David Dukes as Ed Winston
- Phil Brock as George
- Albert Macklin as Don
- Pete Kowanko as Rex
- Vinny Argiro as Ben Sanders
- Bibi Besch as Grace Sanders
- Cheryl A. Pollak as Rhonda (cashier in market)
- Steven Banks as Aldridge
- Charles Lane as Father O'Shea
- J. Don Ferguson as Harlan Rafferty

== Production ==
Two weeks before the film was set to start shooting, director Tom McLoughlin still had not found the right actress for the role of the angel, despite interviewing approximately 5,000 models and actresses. He immediately cast Emmanuelle Béart after seeing her in Claude Berri's film Manon of the Spring while on a business trip to Paris.

Principal photography took place from February 16 to mid-May 1987 in Wilmington, North Carolina.

== Reception ==
On the review aggregator website Rotten Tomatoes, the film holds an approval rating of 13% based on eight reviews, with an average rating of 3.4/10.

On their show, Gene Siskel and Roger Ebert specifically gave the film two emphatic thumbs down, with Ebert complaining that they had picked, along with Teen Wolf Too, the two worst films possible to be released on the same day.

== See also ==
- List of films about angels
