= Jonathan Landau-Litewski =

Jonathan Landau-Litewski is a Scottish man who claimed that his firing was an act of anti-Semitism. In an interview with The Times of Israel, Landau-Litewski claims that he was dismissed from employment after refusing to stop wearing his star of David pendant necklace. He further claimed that his former manager was biased against Jewish people.

According to some sources, this was believed to be the first such public case of its kind in Britain, The case was reportedly mentioned by former First Minister of Scotland Alex Salmond during his talk at Holyrood about antisemitism. According to media sources, an employment tribunal has been arranged for the Landau-Litewski case.
