= Golden Harvest Group =

Bangladeshi diversified conglomerate

- Formation: 2000
- Headquarters: Dhaka, Bangladesh
- Region served: Bangladesh
- Official language: Bengali
- Revenue: ▲US$10.41 million (2020)
- Staff: 1,142
- Website: www.goldenharvestbd.com

Golden Harvest Group (Bengali: গোল্ডেন হারভেস্ট গ্রুপ) is a Bangladeshi diversified conglomerate based in Dhaka. Rajeeb Samdani is the conglomerate’s managing director while Mohius Samad Choudhury is the main director.

== History ==
Golden Harvest InfoTech Limited was established in 2000. It is a software export-oriented company.

Golden Harvest started manufacturing frozen food in 2006.

Golden Harvest founded Taher Ahmed Choudhury Charitable Hospital in 2006 in Bhadeshwar Union, Golapganj Upazila, Sylhet District.

Golden Harvest Developers Limited was established in 2009.

In January 2011, Golden Harvest Agro was given an A grade by the British Retail Consortium.

Golden Harvest Group established Golden Harvest Foods Limited in 2012 to manufacture snacks such as chips and chanachur. It signed an agreement with Nippon Express to launch a joint venture company in Bangladesh. In October 2012, Golden Harvest Agro Industries received permission for their IPO on the Dhaka Stock Exchange.

In 2014, Golden Harvest launched a cold chain network with funding from the United States Agency for International Development (USAID). It also received support from the Cold Chain Bangladesh Alliance.

Golden Harvest is a sponsor of Dhaka Art Summit, of which Rajeeb Samdani is the founder.

In March 2018, Golden Harvest signed an agreement with Jubilant FoodWorks to launch Domino's Pizza in Bangladesh. The first branch was opened in Dhanmondi on 15 March 2019 under a joint venture company called Jubilant Golden Harvest Limited.

During the COVID-19 pandemic in Bangladesh, sales of frozen food increased for Golden Harvest. Frozen Paratha and bread sales increased while frozen snacks such as samosa, sausages and ice cream declined dramatically. The Bangladesh Securities and Exchange Commission scrutinized Golden Harvest Agro Industries' decision to provide 3.79 billion taka loans to its sister concerns without interest.

== Businesses ==
- Golden Harvest Agro Industries Limited
- Golden Harvest InfoTech Limited
- Golden Harvest Ice-Cream Limited (Bloop)
- Golden Harvest Foods Limited
- Golden Harvest Express
- Golden Harvest Dairy Limited
- Fatehpur Estate Limited
- Golden Harvest Developers Limited
- Golden Harvest Commodities Limited
- Nippon Express Bangladesh Limited, a joint venture with Nippon Express.
- Jubilant Golden Harvest Limited, a joint venture with Jubilant FoodWorks.
- Cold Chain Bangladesh Limited, a joint venture with International Finance Corporation.

=== Charities ===
- Samdani Art Foundation, founded by Rajeeb Samdani and his wife, Nadia Samdani.
- Bangladesh Human Rights Foundation
- Taher Ahmed Choudhury Charitable Hospital
- JITA Bangladesh

== See also ==
- Toma Group
- Impress Group
