= Waterproof (film) =

2000 film directed by Barry Berman

- Home release poster
- Directed by: Barry Berman
- Written by: Barry Berman
- Produced by: Cape Fear Filmworks
- Starring: Burt Reynolds; April Grace; Whitman Mayo; Orlando Jones
- Cinematography: Stephen Thompson
- Music by: J. Peter Robinson
- Distributed by: Cloud Ten Pictures
- Release date: August 2, 2001 (Urbanworld Film Festival)
- Running time: 94 minutes
- Country: United States
- Language: English

Waterproof is a 2000 film written and directed by Barry Berman and starring Burt Reynolds, April Grace, Whitman Mayo and Orlando Jones. The film follows Tyree Battle (Grace), who takes Eli Zeal (Reynolds) to her hometown to recover after he is shot in the arm during a robbery committed by her 11-year-old son.

The film was produced by Cape Fear Filmworks and distributed by Cloud Ten Pictures. It was completed in 1998, and released on video in 2001.

== Plot ==
Tyree Battle is single mother, a cab driver, living in Washington, D.C. She is doing everything she can to keep body and soul together, primarily for the sake of her only son, 11-year-old Thaniel. Thaniel is a good kid, but one night, he gets mixed up with a group of older kids, who force Thaniel to rob a local deli market at gunpoint. In the process of the robbery, the store owner, Eli Zeal, is shot in the arm. Searching the rainy night for her son, Tyree finds the situation as it occurs. She determines that Zeal's wound is not fatal, and learns that Zeal is all alone, with no living family. Tyree's concerns are to tend to Zeal's wounds, and to keep her son out of the way of the police. She cannot take Zeal to the hospital because gunshot wounds must be reported to the police. She attends to Zeal's wounds with antiseptic and gauze from a local mini-mart. Thinking one small step at a time, she decides to go to the only place where she is sure will be safe: her old hometown. She drives all night to Waterproof, Louisiana, where her entire family — mother, two brothers, and 100-year-old grandfather — still live, and where Tyree has not been since she mysteriously ran away from home 15 years prior.

The next morning, Tyree, Thaniel and an injured Zeal arrive in the Louisiana Delta town of Waterproof, a land of cotton fields — a virtual throwback to 100 years ago — and where they are enthusiastically greeted by Tyree's mother, Viola. Tyree intends for her grandfather, Sugar, to "heal" Zeal with his homemade remedies, and for her mother to enroll Thaniel in a local school and keep him for a while.

Tyree is itching to leave as quickly as she arrived, but the painful and scarring reasons for leaving home fifteen years ago begin to emerge, affecting everyone in the family, including her two brothers, Brother Big and Natty.

Back in D.C., the police have discovered Zeal's empty store, and are now on the trail of Thaniel and Tyree.

Still in Waterproof, Tyree's skeletons soon come out of the closet, all of which revolve around her once being in love with a young white boy, Chris Hardwick, and the damage that love inadvertently caused, from which Tyree could only run.

In the meantime, Zeal has found a kindred spirit in both Sugar and Viola, and even attends church with them. He begins to enjoy the place Tyree wants to leave.

Eventually, with no changing the past, and encouraged by Zeal to come clean (Tyree has told Zeal the story of her past), Tyree reveals her past to her family, and hopes for the forgiveness that perhaps only family can give.

In a post-credits scene, we learn that Eli has sold his store in Washington to live out the rest of his days in Waterproof.

== Cast ==
- Burt Reynolds as Eli Zeal
- April Grace as Tyree Battle, Whitney Tucker portrays young Tyree
- Whitman Mayo as Sugar
- Orlando Jones as Natty Battle
- Ja'net Dubois as Viola Battle
- Anthony Lee as 'Brother Big' Battle
- Cordereau Dye as Thaniel Battle
- Gil Johnson as Chris Hardwick
- Joe Inscoe as Dr. Austin

== Production ==
Filming took place in Wilmington, North Carolina, with 2nd unit photography in Tensas Parish, Louisiana, and Washington D.C., and was completed in 24 days, with cinematography done by Stephen Thompson, and a production team that included Roy Walker, Frank Capra Jr., Craig Fincannon and Jonathan Cornick.

For the role of Eli, Martin Landau was originally considered.

== Music ==
The music was composed by J. Peter Robinson, with original songs by soul band Sonia Dada.

== Release ==
Although completed in 1998, the film was left with no distributor until the rights were eventually purchased in 2000 by Cloud Ten Pictures. It premiered at the Urbanworld Film Festival August 2, 2001.

=== Reception ===
Ken James of Christian Spotlight Movie Reviews gave it 4 stars out of 5, and wrote, "Technically it is well done and on par with most other indie films. The acting is convincing and the story strong enough to captivate most willing to sit through some initially slow drama."

== Home media ==
The film received a DVD and VHS release from Cloud Ten and Sony Pictures Home Entertainment October 30, 2001.
