= Michael Doven =

American professional photographer

- Occupations: Photographer, film producer
- Known for: Former personal assistant to Tom Cruise
- Spouse: Andrea Morse
- Website: Official website

Michael Doven is an American professional photographer who has also worked in the production of several Hollywood movies. He photographed professional golfer Rick Rhoden. Doven's work in film started as personal assistant and chief of staff to Tom Cruise. Doven received film credits as Cruise's assistant in Far and Away, A Few Good Men, The Firm, and Interview with the Vampire.

Doven was credited as Production Associate in Cruise's 1999 film Magnolia. He subsequently served in an increased capacity as Associate Producer on the 2000 film Mission: Impossible 2, the 2001 film Vanilla Sky, the 2002 film Minority Report, and the 2003 film The Last Samurai. He married a fellow assistant to Cruise, Andrea Morse, the daughter of actor Robert Morse.

== Career ==
=== Photographer ===
Michael Doven is a photographer, and film producer. Subjects photographed by Doven have included singer/songwriter and younger sister of musician Beck, Alyssa Suede, professional golfers Rick Rhoden, and Randy Leen. In April 1985, Doven finished 434th in the Boston Marathon. After competing as an ironman, Doven subsequently appeared on a video Tough Stuff in 1988 by J2 Communications. On the video Tough Stuff along with actress Tracy Scoggins, American football player Marcus Allen, Mexican boxer Carlos Palomino, and volleyball athlete Randy Stoklus, Doven helped to illustrate the techniques of a workout system called "plyometrics". Scroggins explained to The Toronto Star that the plyometrics workout system was developed in the Soviet Union, and commented, "It's a tough workout that men will enjoy, not just women, but it can be done by anyone."

In 2009, Doven's photography work appeared on a music album Bittersweet – a collaboration between Mark Isham and Kate Ceberano;

=== Film producer ===
Doven met a fellow assistant to Cruise, Andrea Morse, and they subsequently married. Andrea Morse is the daughter of actor Robert Morse. He received film credits as Production Associate on movies starring Tom Cruise's then-wife Nicole Kidman, including Eyes Wide Shut, Portrait of a Lady and Practical Magic. Cruise included Doven in family outings, often taking him along for trips with his son Connor Cruise. Doven was the only individual from Cruise's entourage to accompany the actor on a 2002 trip to NASA to meet with astronauts on the Space Shuttle program. Doven had an acting film role in Cruise's Eyes Wide Shut, directed by Stanley Kubrick, in addition to serving in a film production capacity on the movie.

Doven began to take on more influential film production roles in Cruise's movies – serving as Production Associate on the 1999 film Magnolia. He subsequently served in an increased capacity as Associate Producer on the 2000 film Mission: Impossible 2, the 2001 film Vanilla Sky, the 2002 film Minority Report, and the 2003 film The Last Samurai. Doven accompanied Cruise's family when they stayed in Taranaki, New Zealand during film production of The Last Samurai. Doven and his wife were not invited to Cruise's 2006 wedding to Katie Holmes in Rome, Italy, and neither of the Dovens have subsequently had film credits on movies relating to Cruise since the wedding.

Doven is currently CEO of United Pictures Group.

== Filmography ==
=== Production ===
Year	Film	Role	Director
1992	Far and Away	Set assistant to Tom Cruise	Ron Howard
1992	A Few Good Men	Assistant to Tom Cruise	Rob Reiner
1993	The Firm	Assistant to Tom Cruise	Sydney Pollack
1994	Interview with the Vampire	Assistant to Tom Cruise	Neil Jordan
1996	Mission: Impossible	Production Associate	Brian De Palma
1996	Jerry Maguire	Assistant to Tom Cruise	Cameron Crowe
1999	Eyes Wide Shut	Production Associate	Stanley Kubrick
1999	Magnolia	Production Associate	Paul Thomas Anderson
2000	Mission: Impossible 2	Associate Producer	John Woo
2001	Vanilla Sky	Associate Producer	Cameron Crowe
2002	Minority Report	Associate Producer	Steven Spielberg
2003	The Last Samurai	Associate Producer	Edward Zwick
2004	Collateral	Associate Producer	Michael Mann
2015	The Squeeze	Producer	
2015	The Out of Town Wedding	Producer	

=== Acting ===
Year	Title	Role	Notes
1989	Murder, She Wrote	Joey	Ep. # 5.22
1999	Eyes Wide Shut	Ziegler's Secretary	Production Associate, on same film
