= Simon Gosling =

British designer

Simon Gosling in 2010

Simon "Goose" Gosling (born 9 April 1969) is a British designer and builder of special effects models and props. He is best known for his work on the Millennium Falcon cockpit for Star Wars: The Force Awakens in 2014. Also his work on commercials featuring stop-frame animation for Brisk, Apple Jacks and Chips Ahoy in America, and the Windy Miller adverts for Quaker Oats in Britain.

Gosling was born in Shrewsbury, Shropshire, a town he lived in until 1994.

Gosling has created props and models for films including The Brothers Grimm (2005), The Hitchhiker's Guide to the Galaxy (2005) and Stormbreaker (2006). In 2006, he supervised the building of Hex during the Sky One production of Hogfather, an adaptation of the Discworld novel by author Terry Pratchett.

On 22 April 2007, Hogfather won the BAFTA Television Craft Award for best special effects.

Gosling is also a musician, appearing on the soundtrack of the PlayStation videogame Croc 2.

== Selected filmography ==
- Star Wars: Episode I – The Phantom Menace (1997) Assistant prop maker
- Les Visiteurs 2 (1998) Prosthetic technician
- Band of Brothers (2000) Miniature model maker
- Dinotopia (2002) Miniature Modeller
- The Brothers Grimm (2003) Prop Modeller
- The Hitchhiker's Guide to the Galaxy (2004) Prop Modeller
- Stormbreaker (2005) Electronic prop Modeller
- Terry Pratchett's Hogfather (2006) Prop Modeller
- I Want Candy (2006) Prop Modeller
- Babylon A.D. (2007) Prop Modeller
- The Colour of Magic (2007) Supervising Prop Modeller
- Dread (2009) Special effects technician
- Gulliver's Travels (2010) Concept model maker
- Captain America: The First Avenger (2011) Prop Modeller
- Prometheus (2012) Prop Modeller
- Snow White & the Huntsman (2012) Prop Modeller
- Fast & Furious 6 (2013) Prop Modeller
- Jupiter Ascending (2014) Prop Modeller
- Kingsman: The Secret Service (2014) Prop Modeller
- Pan (2015) Prop Modeller
- Star Wars: The Force Awakens (2015) Senior Prop Modelle
