= Steven Siewert =

Steven Siewert is an Australian photojournalist and art photographer.

Siewert's photographs have appeared in the Sydney Morning Herald and the book, "The Last Anzacs: Lest We Forget" in which he documented surviving Gallipoli veterans in a seminal collaboration with author and journalist, Tony Stephens. He has been a recipient of the Nikon/Walkley Portrait Prize three times, most recently winning in 2026 for a portrait of the late Richard Scolyer. He won the same prize in 2008 for "Waiting for Wanda Jackson", published in the Good Weekend. In this same year, he won a Walkley for his series on Australian rockabillies, from which the portrait was drawn. The series was exhibited at the Museum of Sydney.

In 2001, Siewert was awarded an Asialink fellowship to work in Bangkok, Thailand with The Nation. Siewert's photography has been included in solo and group exhibitions at the Leica gallery in Solms, Germany, the Museum of Sydney, the Centre for Contemporary Photography in Melbourne, the State Library of NSW and Albury Regional Art Gallery. He is a former member of the Australian Oculi collective.

Siewert was a finalist for the National Photographic Portrait Prize in 2014 with a portrait of Reg Mombasa. More recently, he was nominated as Nikon-Walkley Press Photographer of the Year in 2025.

== Books ==
- The Last Anzacs: Lest We Forget, Tony Stephens (Author) and Siewert, Fremantle Arts Centre Press (April 2003) ISBN 978-1-920731-36-6

== Exhibitions ==
- Centre for Contemporary Photography, Melbourne Australia, 2005
- Rockabilly: living the 50s, Museum of Sydney, 2008
