= Firestarter (1984 film) =

1984 film by Mark L. Lester

- Theatrical release poster
- Directed by: Mark L. Lester
- Screenplay by: Stanley Mann
- Based on: Firestarter by Stephen King
- Produced by: Frank Capra Jr.; Martha Schumacher
- Starring: David Keith; Drew Barrymore; Freddie Jones; Heather Locklear; Martin Sheen; George C. Scott; Art Carney; Louise Fletcher
- Cinematography: Giuseppe Ruzzolini
- Edited by: David Rawlins; Ronald Sanders
- Music by: Tangerine Dream
- Production company: Dino De Laurentiis Company
- Distributed by: Universal Pictures
- Release date: May 11, 1984
- Running time: 114 minutes
- Country: United States
- Language: English
- Budget: $12 million
- Box office: $17.1 million (US/Canada) $18.9 million (worldwide rentals)

Firestarter is a 1984 American science fiction thriller horror film based on Stephen King's 1980 novel of the same name. The plot concerns a girl who develops pyrokinesis and the secret government agency known as The Shop which seeks to control her. The film was directed by Mark L. Lester, and stars David Keith, Drew Barrymore, Martin Sheen and George C. Scott. Firestarter was shot in and around Wilmington, Chimney Rock and Lake Lure, North Carolina. This is the second film which featured the collaboration between Scott and Sheen, after the 1972 film Rage.

A miniseries follow-up to the film, Firestarter: Rekindled, was released in 2002 on the Sci-Fi Channel and a remake, also titled Firestarter and produced by Blumhouse Productions, was released on May 13, 2022.

== Plot ==
As college students, Andy McGee and Vicky Tomlinson participated in an experiment in which they were given a dose of a low-grade hallucinogen called LOT-6. While the other participants suffered terrible side effects, the experiment gave Vicky and Andy telepathic abilities; Vicky can read minds and Andy can control others to do and believe what he wants, though the effort sometimes gives him nosebleeds, limiting this otherwise very strong power. Now married, they have an 8-year-old daughter named Charlene "Charlie" McGee, who has pyrokinetic abilities (the power to control heat and fire) and can also see the near future.

Andy comes home from work one day to find Vicky murdered and Charlie abducted, with evidence suggesting Vicky was also tortured before being killed; the family had already suspected that the government agency that sponsored the experiment, the Department of Scientific Intelligence ("The Shop"), was watching them, with the government wanting to weaponize Charlie's power. Andy finds Charlie and rescues her by blinding the agents and for the next year they are on the run.

Farmer Irv Manders and his wife Norma take in the pair; Andy tells Irv the truth so that when The Shop arrives, he is ready to stand with them. However, Charlie quickly dispatches the agents when they arrive. They go on the run again, but Andy's power has weakened. They go to a secluded cabin and prepare to go public with their story. Unfortunately, the head of The Shop, Captain James Hollister, sends agent and assassin John Rainbird to capture them and stop the release of information. To protect themselves, Andy writes letters to major newspapers, unintentionally revealing their location. After capture, father and daughter are kept separated. Andy is medicated and subjected to tests, and given drugs which decrease his powers. Meanwhile, Rainbird pretends to be "John", a friendly orderly employed by The Shop to gain Charlie's trust and encourage her to submit to the tests.

Charlie's powers increase at an alarming rate. She continually demands to see her father as they promised. Andy is revealed to be faking the acceptance of his drugs, so his powers have never decreased and it was all a ruse to make Hollister drop his guard. Once alone on a walk far from the house, Andy uses his power to get information from Hollister (such as "John"'s true identity) and arranges to leave with Charlie that night. He slips Charlie a note and she immediately tells John/Rainbird about the escape. Since he has wanted to kill Charlie since first hearing about her, he hides in the barn so he can kill Andy as well. Charlie enters the barn first and Rainbird successfully convinces her to start climbing up the ladder to him.

His plan is foiled once Andy enters and Charlie instead runs to her father. She tells him that "John" is present and asks if they can take him with them. She is saddened and angered to find out the truth, yet believes Rainbird when he states that he will not kill her father if she comes to him. To save his daughter, Andy orders the still mind-controlled Hollister to shoot at Rainbird. However, Rainbird kills Hollister, after which Andy, using his powers, causes Rainbird to leap to the ground, breaking his leg. Rainbird shoots Andy in the neck, fatally wounding him. He then fires at Charlie but she detonates the bullet and engulfs Rainbird in the ensuing fire, killing him. Before dying, Andy pleads with her to use her powers to bring the facility down. The entire security team arrives and she eliminates them one by one with her powers and makes her way off the property. Charlie hitchhikes back to the Manders' farm and is welcomed back. Shortly after, Charlie and Irv arrive in New York City to tell her story to the media.

== Cast ==
- David Keith as Andrew McGee
- Drew Barrymore as Charlie McGee
- Freddie Jones as Dr. Joseph Wanless
- Heather Locklear as Vicky Tomlinson McGee
- Martin Sheen as Captain James Hollister
- George C. Scott as John Rainbird
- Art Carney as Irv Manders
- Louise Fletcher as Norma Manders
- Moses Gunn as Dr. Pynchot
- George P. Wilbur as DSi Orderly

== Production ==
During filming of The Thing, Universal offered John Carpenter the chance to direct the film, who hired Bill Lancaster to adapt the novel into a screenplay, which Stephen King approved of. Months later, Carpenter hired Bill Phillips to write another version with Richard Dreyfuss as Andy, but when The Thing underperformed financially, Universal replaced Carpenter with Mark L. Lester, who brought Stanley Mann to write a screenplay that stayed closer to the novel than the abandoned screenplays that Carpenter had commissioned.

Lancaster's father Burt, originally cast as Captain Hollister, had to withdraw following heart surgery and was replaced by Martin Sheen.

Produced by Dino De Laurentiis, the film was the first to be shot at his new studio complex in North Carolina. Shot in and around the city of Wilmington, North Carolina from September 12 to November 26, 1983, it was the first film shot there after the commission of the North Carolina Film Office, and is regarded as launching the city as what is now a burgeoning hub of film and television productions. Over 1,350 film and television projects have been produced in Wilmington since Firestarter.

De Laurentiis had searched unsuccessfully for a Gone with the Wind-style location that would suit the vision of the film. After encountering an issue of Southern Accents magazine that featured the historic Orton Plantation near Wilmington, De Laurentiis, producer Frank Capra Jr., and Martha De Laurentiis travelled to the area for a location scout. They decided the property would be perfect as the headquarters for the evil government agency that was to track down Charlie (Barrymore).

De Laurentiis approached James and Luola Sprunt, who at the time owned Orton, and surprised them by asking to buy the property so he could set the home ablaze for a dramatic scene in the film. They declined, but offered to let the production use the property for exterior shots and some small interior scenes. A smaller scale replica of the main house was built for the actual fire scene. Having since been used in dozens of films and television shows since Firestarter, Orton is now owned by Louis Moore Bacon.

Mark Lester recalled, "The underlining tone is the CIA and corruption. I got my hands on a book about real experiments that the CIA did with college kids and LSD and hallucinagenic drugs, so that part was true. Dino wanted to make an anti-CIA movie and I guess Firestarter has a lot of that political paranoia about secret agents killing people and stuff."

== Reception ==
On the review aggregator website Rotten Tomatoes, 40% of 35 critics' reviews are positive. The website's consensus reads: "Firestarter's concept hews too closely to other known Stephen King adaptations, though it's got nice special effects (including scenery-chewing George C. Scott)." Metacritic assigned the film a weighted average score of 50 out of 100, based on seven critics, indicating "mixed or average" reviews.

Roger Ebert gave the film two stars out of four, and wrote, "the most astonishing thing" about it was "how boring it is ... there's not a character in this movie that is convincing, even for a moment, nor a line in this movie that even experienced performers can make real;" and, "we don't feel sorry for Barrymore because she's never developed as a believable little girl -- just a plot gimmick."

After seeing a rough cut, Stephen King declared it "One of the worst of the bunch" of the adaptations of his work he had seen, dubbing it "flavorless". He and director Mark Lester later fought over the comments, though King told Cinefantastique he feels Firestarter's producer was responsible for its failings. However, he did find favor in one scene (where Charlie is trained by her father to cook bread into toast), saying he wished he'd thought of it.

Colin Greenland reviewed Firestarter for Imagine magazine, and stated that "I suspect the story was ruined before it ever got to the actors: spoilt by oversimplification and the surgical removal of all King's narrative intelligence. The great final conflagration comes as a relief. Yet another movie with all its conviction reserved for the special effects."

== Soundtrack ==
Firestarter

Soundtrack album by Tangerine Dream
- Released: July 1984
- Recorded: 1984
- Genre: Electronic
- Length: 41:39
- Label: MCA

Tangerine Dream chronology
Risky Business (1984)	Firestarter (1984)	Flashpoint (1984)

Firestarter is the twenty-second major release and fifth soundtrack album by the German electronic music group Tangerine Dream.

AllMusic rated the soundtrack four out of five stars.

No.	Title	Length
1.	"Crystal Voice"	3:07
2.	"The Run"	4:50
3.	"Testlab"	4:00
4.	"Charly the Kid"	3:51
5.	"Escaping Point"	5:10
6.	"Rainbirds Move"	2:31
7.	"Burning Force"	4:17
8.	"Between Realities"	2:53
9.	"Shop Territory"	3:15
10.	"Flash Final"	5:15
11.	"Out of the Heat"	2:30
Total length:		41:39

=== Personnel ===
- Edgar Froese – keyboards, electronic equipment, guitar
- Christopher Franke – synthesizers, electronic equipment, electronic percussion
- Johannes Schmoelling – keyboards, electronic equipment

== Reboot ==
In April 2017, Jason Blum and Akiva Goldsman announced that they were rebooting Firestarter for Universal and Blumhouse, with Goldsman co-writing with Scott Teems. In December, 2019, Keith Thomas was announced as director. In September 2020, Zac Efron was cast as Andy McGee. In February 2021, Michael Greyeyes was cast to play John Rainbird. Production commenced in May, 2021. In June 2021, Ryan Kiera Armstrong was cast in the lead role of Charlie McGee.
