= De Laurentiis Entertainment Group =

Defunct entertainment production company

- Formerly: North Carolina Film Corporation (1984–1985)
- Type: Film studio
- Industry: Film production and distribution
- Predecessor: Embassy Films Associates
- Founded: 1984; 42 years ago
- Defunct: 1989; 37 years ago
- Fate: Split up: Film library sold to Paravision International; Australia operations sold to Village Roadshow; Wilmington operations sold to Carolco Pictures
- Successors: Wilmington Studio: Carolco Pictures; Australia Studio: Village Roadshow Pictures; Company: Dino De Laurentiis Communications; Library: StudioCanal (through Paravision International) (with some exceptions)
- Headquarters: Wilmington, North Carolina
- Key people: Dino De Laurentiis
- Products: Motion pictures

De Laurentiis Entertainment Group (DEG) was a film production company and distribution studio founded in the United States by Italian producer Dino De Laurentiis. The company is notable for producing Manhunter, Blue Velvet, the horror films Near Dark and Evil Dead II, King Kong Lives (the sequel to De Laurentiis' remake of King Kong), and Bill & Ted's Excellent Adventure, as well as distributing The Transformers: The Movie.

The company's main studios were located in Wilmington, North Carolina, which is now Cinespace Wilmington.The studio's first releases were in 1986. It went bankrupt two years later after Million Dollar Mystery, among other films, failed at the box office. Carolco Pictures acquired DEG's Wilmington studio in 1989.

== History ==
In 1983, Dino De Laurentiis produced Universal Pictures' Firestarter in Wilmington, North Carolina. The governor of North Carolina, Jim Hunt, claimed that the filming increased economic activity in the state. Hunt used incentives and loans to allow De Laurentiis to buy a local warehouse to convert into a studio. In early 1984, De Laurentiis founded the North Carolina Film Corporation, with Martha Schumacher as president.

Led by Stephen Greenwald in one of the most innovative financing structures of its time, in 1985, DEG acquired Embassy Pictures from The Coca-Cola Company, allowing for North American distribution of De Laurentiis' new product. Dino De Laurentiis continued to pre-sell his films for overseas distribution, as he had done in the past. In May 1986, De Laurentiis took DEG public, raising $240 million in the process. The following month, DEG's first slate of films were released. In 1986, De Laurentiis formed an Australian subsidiary, De Laurentiis Entertainment Limited (DEL), which built a studio on the Gold Coast. Although De Laurentiis asserted that the company would make films on par with the major studios, most of DEG's slate consisted of films budgeted at $10 million or less, below the industry standard of $14–16 million, with the notable exceptions of King Kong Lives and Tai-Pan, the only studio-level films DEG financed. Also that year, DEG entered into a strategic partnership with producers Fred Silverman and Gordon Farr to launch the syndicated strip Honeymoon Hotel, with a promise to run it for 100 episodes, and a new starring vehicle for Isabel Sanford. Later that year, DEG also financed another syndicated strip with Silverman and Farr to set up California Girls, with Viacom Enterprises serving as distributor of the series.

Canadian distribution of DEG releases were done by Paramount Pictures through its Famous Players division. In May 1986, rival Cineplex Odeon Corporation unsuccessfully attempted to sue Paramount for breaching a pre-set Canadian distribution contract DEG had with the chain's Pan-Canadian Films division.

By August 1987, DEG was $16.5 million in debt, citing the box-office failures and/or disappointments of its product. Dino De Laurentiis refused offers to sell the company because he wanted to retain controlling interest. Around the same time, De Laurentiis' daughter Raffaella exited her role as DEG's president of production. After the release of the HBO Pictures-produced The Trouble with Spies on December 4, 1987, DEG was forced to halt theatrical distribution, with the remaining films in its slate either going direct-to-video or released by other distributors (for example, United Artists acquired distribution rights to the 1988 films Illegally Yours and Pumpkinhead).

In 1988, founder Dino De Laurentiis quit the studio amidst the failures of such films and formed a successor company entitled Dino de Laurentiis Communications. That same year, DEG's Gold Coast studio would be acquired by Village Roadshow, whose intended strategy became the basis for Village Roadshow's Silver Series line, and some of the workforce joined the newly-formed Village Roadshow Pictures. A year later, in April 1989, the studio in Wilmington would be sold to Mario Kassar and Andrew G. Vajna's Carolco Pictures. Carolco would also take on production of Total Recall, a film DEG had an early version of in pre-production with Patrick Swayze as Quaid and Bruce Beresford as director (David Cronenberg had also been approached), where it was to have been shot in Australia.

The same year DEG's Wilmington studio was sold to Carolco, its library, along with the Embassy Pictures library that DEG acquired, was sold to Paravision International, then a subsidiary of L'Oréal which also held the Filmation library at the time. The Paravision library excluding Filmation was later sold to Canal+ in 1994. As a result, the DEG library is currently held by StudioCanal; with some exceptions.

== Films released ==
Release date	Title	Notes
June 6, 1986	Raw Deal	
June 6, 1986	My Little Pony: The Movie	owned by Hasbro; home video rights owned by Shout! Studios
July 25, 1986	Maximum Overdrive	
August 8, 1986	The Transformers: The Movie	owned by Hasbro; home video rights owned by Shout! Studios
August 15, 1986	Manhunter	home video rights owned by MGM
September 19, 1986	Blue Velvet	home video rights owned by MGM
September 19, 1986	Radioactive Dreams	
October 24, 1986	Trick or Treat	
November 7, 1986	Tai-Pan	
December 12, 1986	Crimes of the Heart	
December 19, 1986	King Kong Lives	
January 30, 1987	The Bedroom Window	
February 6, 1987	From the Hip	
March 13, 1987	Evil Dead II	released through shell company Rosebud Releasing Corporation to bypass MPAA regulations
June 12, 1987	Million Dollar Mystery	
October 2, 1987	Near Dark	
October 16, 1987	Weeds	
November 6, 1987	Hiding Out	
November 20, 1987	Date with an Angel	
December 4, 1987	The Trouble with Spies	distributed only; produced by HBO Pictures; owned by HBO
December 11, 1987	Cobra Verde	direct-to-video in U.S.
May 13, 1988	Illegally Yours	released by United Artists in U.S.; owned by MGM
August 17, 1988	Traxx	direct-to-video in U.S.
October 14, 1988	Pumpkinhead	released by United Artists in U.S.; owned by MGM
October 21, 1988	Tapeheads	released by Avenue Pictures in U.S.
October 1988	Dracula's Widow	direct-to-video in U.S.
February 17, 1989	Bill & Ted's Excellent Adventure	international distribution only; co-produced with Nelson Entertainment, released by Orion Pictures in U.S.; owned by MGM
May 6, 1992	Collision Course	direct-to-video in U.S.
October 30, 1992	Rampage	released by Miramax Films in U.S.; owned by Paramount Pictures via Miramax
