= Frank Capra Jr. =

American film producer (1934–2007)

- Born: Frank Warner Capra; March 20, 1934; Los Angeles, California, U.S.
- Died: December 19, 2007 (aged 73); Philadelphia, Pennsylvania, U.S.
- Other names: Capra, Frank Warner
- Occupation: Film producer
- Years active: 1961–2007
- Spouses: Priscilla Ann Parson (m. 1958; div. 1984) Deborah Lewis Sprunt (m. 1986)
- Children: 3
- Parents: Frank Capra (father); Lucille Warner (mother)

Frank Warner Capra (March 20, 1934 – December 19, 2007), known as Frank Capra Jr., was an American film and television producer. He was one of the three children of film director Frank Capra and his second wife, Lucille Warner. His career spanned some five decades, beginning as an associate producer on his father's last feature, Pocketful of Miracles (1961), and running through the Planet of the Apes sequels of the early 1970s to a second career as a studio executive in North Carolina. His own sons, Frank Capra III and Jonathan Capra, are assistant directors.

At the time of his death, Capra Jr. was president of EUE/Screen Gems studio in Wilmington, North Carolina, and a member of the North Carolina Film Council.

== Career ==
Capra began in the industry as an associate producer on Pocketful of Miracles (1961), the last film directed by his father. He went on to work as an associate producer on Marooned (1969), Play It Again, Sam (1972) and three sequels in the Planet of the Apes series, before producing features in his own right from the mid-1970s, among them Billy Jack Goes to Washington (1977), An Eye for an Eye (1981), Firestarter (1984) and Marie (1985).

Capra first came to Wilmington, North Carolina, while scouting locations for Firestarter, which was executive produced by Dino De Laurentiis; he selected Wilmington and Orton Plantation at Winnabow for the shoot. The production was the first at what became a permanent studio complex in the city, and is generally credited with beginning North Carolina's film industry. Capra settled in Wilmington and, after the Cooney family acquired the studios in 1997, was installed as president of the facility, by then operating as EUE/Screen Gems. He held the post until his death.

== Death ==
Capra Jr. died on December 19, 2007, aged 73, at a hospital in Philadelphia, Pennsylvania, after a long battle with prostate cancer.

== Filmography ==
- Pocketful of Miracles (1961) (associate producer)
- Marooned (1969) (associate producer)
- Escape from the Planet of the Apes (1971) (associate producer)
- Conquest of the Planet of the Apes (1972) (associate producer)
- Play It Again, Sam (1972) (associate producer)
- Battle for the Planet of the Apes (1973) (associate producer)
- Tom Sawyer (1973) (associate producer)
- Trapped Beneath the Sea (1974) (TV film) (producer)
- Billy Jack Goes to Washington (1977) (producer)
- Born Again (1978) (producer)
- The Black Marble (1980) (producer)
- An Eye for an Eye (1981) (producer)
- High Hopes: The Capra Years (1981) (TV film) (producer)
- The Seduction (1982) (executive producer)
- Vice Squad (1982) (executive producer)
- Firestarter (1984) (producer)
- Marie (1985) (producer)
- Death Before Dishonor (1987) (executive producer)
- Waterproof (2000) (producer)
- Queen City Blowout (2003) (executive producer)
