= EUE/Screen Gems =

American film and television studio production company

EUE/Screen Gems Ltd.
- Logo of former parent company, Screen Gems
- Type: Private
- Industry: Filmmaking
- Founded: 1965
- Headquarters: New York, New York, US
- Key people: Chris Cooney (CEO)
- Number of employees: 100 (2011)
- Website: EUEScreenGems.com

EUE/Screen Gems Ltd. is an American film and television studio that owns and operates facilities in Miami, Florida. The company collaborates with other studios and producers for the development, production, marketing, and distribution of entertainment for feature film, television, and digital content.

== History ==
Brothers Stephen and Michael Elliot founded a studio in New York City just before World War II, as photographers for department stores and advertising agencies. After the war, they saw the commercial potential of television as an advertising medium. In 1948 they teamed up with William Unger to form Elliot, Unger & Elliot (EUE), one of the earliest commercial-production companies for the television industry.

In 1959, Columbia Pictures acquired EUE and eventually merged it with Screen Gems, Columbia's then-television production division, and renamed the entity EUE/Screen Gems. EUE/Screen Gems was managed by Columbia production executive George Cooney.

In June 1982, Columbia Pictures was sold to The Coca-Cola Company. The following year, Cooney acquired EUE/Screen Gems' assets from Coca-Cola.

In 1996, EUE/Screen Gems acquired Carolco Pictures' Wilmington, North Carolina film and production studios, after Carolco had filed for Chapter 11 bankruptcy reorganization. The facility became EUE/Screen Gems Studios.

In May 2009, EUE/Screen Gems Studios opened Stage 10 in Wilmington, the third largest film and television production stage in the U.S. The studio is a 37,500-square-foot (3,480 m^{2}) columnless structure with a 60x60x10.5-foot, 186,000 gallon special effects water tank.

In 2010, EUE/Screen Gems signed a 50-year lease with the city of Atlanta, Georgia to use the historic Lakewood Fairgrounds as a film and television production studio. In addition to refurbishing and using the historic structures already on the property, the company built a 37,500-square-foot (3,480 m^{2}) sound stage. With expansion, the complex now offers eleven sound stages with 250,000 square feet of production space.

In 2015, EUE/Screen Gems launched studios in Miami, Florida, in partnership with Viacom Inc. The two-stage, 88,000-square-foot (8,200 m^{2}) production facility was built by the Miami Omni Community Redevelopment Agency (CRA) as a public-private partnership with EUE/Screen Gems Studios.

In September 2023, Cinespace Studios acquired the Atlanta and Wilmington studio facilities from EUE/Screen Gems.

== Notes ==
- The WB/The CW show One Tree Hill, The WB's Dawson's Creek and over 300 films, commercials and television projects have been shot at the Wilmington studios. Other productions produced in Wilmington include CBS's Under the Dome, HBO's Eastbound & Down, and Fox's Sleepy Hollow; plus 2013 box office #1 films Iron Man 3, The Conjuring, and We're the Millers, and 2022 #1 Scream.
- Rachael Ray is produced for Harpo Productions and distributed by CBS Media Ventures at the New York facility which has also hosted hundreds of productions since 1965.
- Brandon Lee was killed at the Wilmington studios following a firearms malfunction during filming for The Crow.
