= Martha De Laurentiis =

American film producer (1954–2021)

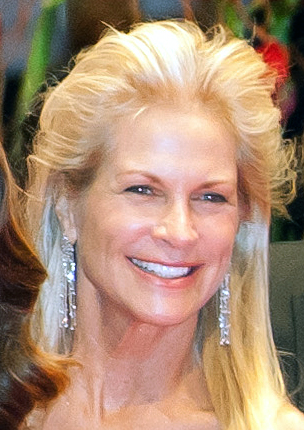
- De Laurentiis in 2015
- Born: Martha Schumacher; July 10, 1954; Lancaster, Pennsylvania, U.S.
- Died: December 4, 2021 (aged 67); Beverly Hills, California, U.S.
- Occupations: Film; television producer
- Years active: 1979–2021
- Known for: President of De Laurentiis Entertainment Group
- Spouse: Dino De Laurentiis (m. 1990; died 2010)
- Children: 2

Martha De Laurentiis (née Schumacher and credited as such until 1995; July 10, 1954 – December 4, 2021) was an American film producer. De Laurentiis was known for producing films such as Breakdown, U-571, Hannibal, and Red Dragon with her husband Dino De Laurentiis, as well as the television series Hannibal.

== Biography ==
Born Martha Schumacher on July 10, 1954, in Lancaster, Pennsylvania, she grew up in Piqua, Ohio. In 1972, she was crowned Ohio's Junior Miss. She attended Ball State University and worked as a model in New York, before working in production on films like The Warriors and Wolfen. She also worked in production accounting on various television projects.

In 1980, she joined the De Laurentiis Entertainment Group as an assistant production accountant and eventually became the company's chairman.

De Laurentiis was a jury member at the 65th Berlin International Film Festival.

On December 16, 2017, she was awarded an honorary doctorate of humanities by Ball State.

She and Dino married in 1990, and they had two daughters, Carolyna and Dina. Dino died in 2010; Martha died from cancer on December 4, 2021, at the age of 67.
