= Cinespace Film Studios =

Canadian company founded 1988

Cinespace Film Studios is a group of film studio facilities in the US and Canada. It was founded in 1988 by Greek-Canadian Nick Mirkopoulos. The studio started with a facility in Vaughan, a suburb of Toronto, which had been in operation since the 1960s. Current studios include facilities in Toronto, a branch in Chicago (Cinespace Chicago Film Studios) founded in 2007 with Mirkopoulos's nephew, Alex Pissios, and facilities in Atlanta and Wilmington, NC acquired in 2023 from EUE/Screen Gems. In 2022, TPG Real Estate Partners acquired the Studio Babelsberg facilities in Potsdam-Babelsberg and merged them into Cinespace.

== Studios ==
=== Kipling Avenue Studios ===
The company acquired a 30 acres (0.12 km^{2}) campus at 777 Kipling Avenue in Toronto's Etobicoke area in 2009.

At the 2017 Toronto International Film Festival, Mayor of Toronto John Tory joined with Cinespace officials to announce plans to build two very large new studios on the site, with a combined footprint of 50,000 square feet (4,600 m^{2}). One of the large studios will be permanently devoted to underwater filming.

Selected Feature Films
Film Links	Year
Resident Evil: Retribution	2012
The Mortal Instruments: City of Bones	2013
Pacific Rim	2013
Pompeii	2014
xXx: Return of Xander Cage	2017
Flatliners	2017

Television Series

- Beauty & the Beast (2012–2016)
- Black Mirror
- Condor
- Conviction (2016)
- Falling Water
- Good Witch
- Reign (2013–2017)
- Taken
- The Handmaid's Tale
- The Umbrella Academy
- Titans
- Locke & Key

=== Kleinburg ===
Toronto International Studios is a film studio that was established in Kleinburg, Ontario in the 1950s. Its geo-coordinates are 43.85243°N 79.64809°W.

Cinespace moved out of the studios and upgraded to the Vaughan Sports Center in 2015, a baseball training complex.

Selected Films
Film links	Year
The Hired Gun	1957
The Fox	1967
The First Time	1969
The Reincarnate	1971
Mahoney's Estate	1972
Recommendation for Mercy	1975
Death Weekend	1976
Silver Streak	1976
Equus	1977
Rituals	1977
Welcome to Blood City	1977
Riel	1979
H. G. Wells' The Shape of Things to Come	1979
Fish Hawk	1980
Virus	1980
The Amateur	1981
Class of 1984	1982
The Wars	1983
Strange Brew	1983
Sesame Street Presents Follow That Bird	1985
The Fly	1986
Love at Stake	1987
Divided Loyalties	1990
The Good Son	1993
To Die For	1995
Murder at 1600	1997
Dick	1999
The Sentinel	2006
Casino Jack	2010

Selected television films
TV movie links	Year
The Day Reagan Was Shot	2001
The Brady Bunch in the White House	2002

Selected television shows
TV links	Year
Hudson's Bay	1959
The Forest Rangers	1963–1966
Hatch's Mill	1967
The Adventures of Timothy Pilgrim	1975
The Littlest Hobo	1979-1985
You Can't Do That on Television	1979-1990
Matt and Jenny	1979-1980
Fraggle Rock	1983-1987
Shining Time Station	1991-1996
The Doodlebops	2005-2007
The Big Comfy Couch	2006

=== Chicago ===
Cinespace Chicago Film Studios opened for business in 2011 and Alex Pissios, the president and CEO of the company, worked with his uncle, Nick Mirkopoulos, to establish the Studios in Chicago. Mirkopoulos and Pissios purchased 60 acres of the former Ryerson Steel complex in the Windy City's North Lawndale neighborhood. The Studios are the largest independent movie studios outside of Los Angeles.

The studios have continued to expand and now have 36 sound stages. Pissios and Cinespace Chicago Film Studios were featured in the December 2019 Chicago Magazine and highlighted the success and influence the studio has had on the film industry in Chicago. Cinespace Chicago Film Studios, is the “Hollywood of the Midwest,” bringing more than 15,000 jobs in digital media and education opportunities to the community and region by revitalizing a depressed neighborhood. Cinespace Chicago has been instrumental in infusing billions of dollars of revenue into the city and the state of Illinois.

Its 70 acres (0.28 km^{2}) campus has been the nexus for over 40 major productions used to film multiple television series and feature films, including:

- Chicago Med
- Chicago Fire
- Chicago PD
- Chicago Justice
- Empire
- Shameless
- Utopia
- Next
- Mixtape
- Jack's Big Music Show
- The Chi
- Fargo
- The Exorcist
- Sense8
- Patriot
- APB
- Proven Innocent
- Night Sky
- Zoobiquity

Selected Feature Films
Film Links	Year	Notes
Transformers: Dark of the Moon	2011	
Divergent	2014	
Captive State	2017	
Rampage	2017	
Widows	2018	
Proud Mary	2018	

The studio is planned to have 36 sound stages on its 2 million square foot main campus in Chicago's North Lawndale neighborhoods. Additional studios have been under construction at 31st and Kedzie. In addition to studio space, Cinespace Chicago Film Studios houses numerous production offices and support spaces as well as production tenants.

Cinespace partnered with DePaul University's film school in 2013 to house student classrooms, two interactive stages, faculty offices, lounges, and equipment vaults. Ranked in the top 25 film schools nationwide, DePaul University's School of Cinematic Arts program teaches aspiring producers and creatives about all aspects of television and film production.

Since its inception, Cinespace has brought in more than $3 billion in film-related spending to Chicago.
