= Fairbridge =

Fairbridge may refer to:

Charities

- Fairbridge, a UK-based charitable organisation supporting disadvantaged children
- Fairbridge Western Australia Inc., an Australian youth charity that operates Fairbridge Village in Western Australia

People

- Kingsley Fairbridge, South Africa born educator
- Rhodes Fairbridge, geologist and son of Kingsley Fairbridge

Places

- Fairbridge, a locality in the Australian state of Western Australia

Other

- Fairbridge Festival, an annual music festival
