= Darina Al Joundi =

Lebanese-born stage actor

- دارينا الجندي
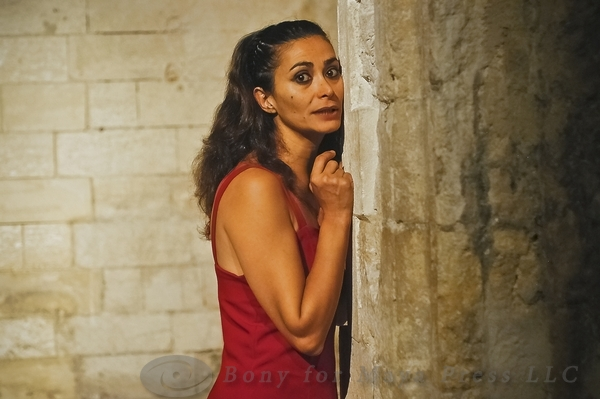
- Al-Joundi in 2010
- Occupation: Stage actor
- Parent: Hassem Al Joundi

Darina Al Joundi (Arabic: دارينا الجندي) is a Lebanese-born stage actor. She became a French citizen after Prime Minister Manuel Valls read a review of her performance at the 2012 Avignon Festival and decided to speed up her application. She has promoted women's rights for the French government.

== Early life ==
Darina Al Joundi was born circa 1969. Her father, Hassem Al Joundi, was a Syrian author and politician and her mother was Lebanese. She grew up in a Muslim family and attended Catholic schools. After she was sent to a psychiatric hospital run by nuns in Jounieh, she decided to emigrate to France.

== Career ==
Al Joundi became an actress in France. She co-wrote Le jour où Nina Simone a cessé de chanter, a one-woman show about her struggle to obtain French citizenship, Her performance at the 2012 Festival d'Avignon received good reviews from theatre critics. After Prime Minister Manuel Valls read an article about her in Le Monde in 2012, he decided to speed up her application for French citizenship.

On September 27, 2012, Al Joundi was invited to speak at the French Ministry of Women's Rights by Minister Najat Vallaud-Belkacem alongside the editor-in-chief of Marie-Claire, Catherine Durand.

== Works ==
- Al Joundi, Darina; Kacimi, Mohamed (2008). Le jour où Nina Simone a cessé de chanter. Arles: Actes Sud. ISBN 9782742772841. OCLC 231745941.

== Filmography ==
Year	Title	Role	Director	Notes
2004	The Gate of Sun	Ghost lady	Yousry Nasrallah	
2007	A Lost Man	Najla Saleh	Danielle Arbid	
2015	Homeland	Mrs. Youssef	John David Coles	Episode: "Why is This Night Different?"
2016	Tyrant	Liberal woman	Deborah Chow	Episode: "A Rock and a Hard Place"
2018	The Romanoffs	Raha Azim	Matthew Weiner	Episode: "The Violet Hour"
2018	Slam	Rana Nasser	Partho Sen-Gupta	
2021	Copilot	Suleima	Anne Zohra Berrached	
