= Slam (2018 film) =

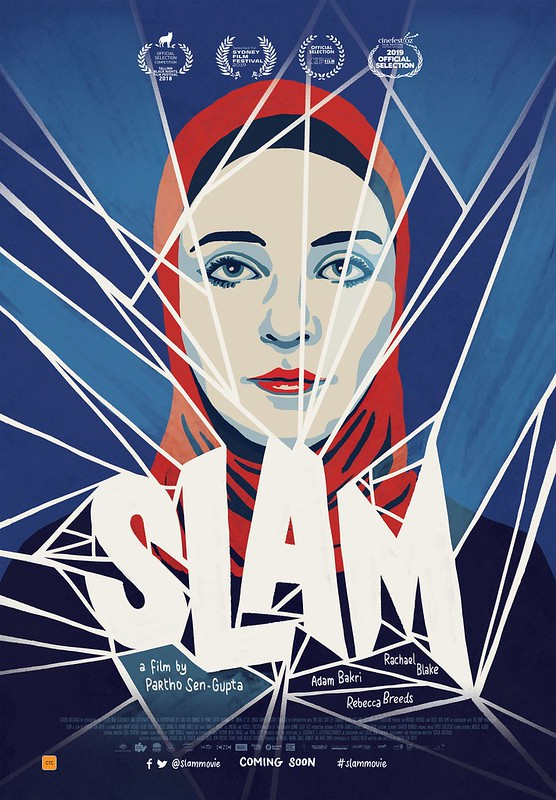
- Australian release poster
- Directed by: Partho Sen-Gupta
- Written by: Partho Sen-Gupta
- Produced by: Michael Wrenn; Marc Irmer; Tenille Kennedy
- Starring: Adam Bakri; Rachael Blake; Rebecca Breeds; Darina Al Joundi; Danielle Horvat
- Cinematography: Bonnie Elliott
- Edited by: Annick Raoul
- Music by: Eryck Abecassis
- Release date: 27 November 2018
- Running time: 116 minutes
- Countries: Australia, France
- Language: English

Slam is a 2018 Australian drama film written and directed by Partho Sen-Gupta.

== Plot ==
Ricky Nasser is a young Australian whose peaceful suburban life turns into hell when sister Ameena, a slam poet, disappears without a trace.

== Cast ==
- Adam Bakri as Ricky Nasser
- Rachael Blake as Joanne Hendricks
- Rebecca Breeds as Sally McLeary-Nasser
- Darina Al Joundi as Rana Nasser
- Danielle Horvat as Ameena Nasser
- Abby Aziz as Hanan Faour
- Damian Hill as Shane
- Russell Dykstra as Paul Koustakidis
- Annie Byron as Diana
- Nicholas Hope as Pete the Journalist
- David Roberts as Alan McLeary

== Production ==
Director Partho Sen-Gupta was inspired to write Slam after his partner, Alana Lentin, suggested that she join him at a slam poetry event in Western Sydney, during a break from filming his 2014 film Sunrise. At the time, Prime Minister Tony Abbott was voicing criticism about Muslim women and the hijab, and there was some hostility towards Muslims in the community. However, Sen-Gupta said that it was " not a social commentary film. It's like Sunrise, a more stylistic piece".

The film is an official Australian-French co-production with funding from Screen Australia, Screenwest, Screen NSW, the French National Center of Cinematography and the moving image, Creative Media Solutions and private funders. The main roles are played by Adam Bakri and Rachael Blake. It was an official selected project at the 2016 International Film Festival Rotterdam's CineMart and the 2016 Berlinale Co-production Market.

The film is set in modern-day Sydney, Australia, and was shot on location in its western suburbs.

== Release ==
Slam had its world premiere at the Official Selection Competition at the Tallinn Black Nights Film Festival on 27 November 2018.

On 15 June 2019, the film had its Australian premiere at the Sydney Film Festival in the Special Presentations section at the State Theatre. It went on to screen at many film festivals, notably at the Melbourne International Film Festival, and was the opening film at the 2019 Darwin International Film Festival.

== Reception ==
British film critic Victor Fraga of DMovies called it "the film of the year" in his review of the premiere screening at the 2018 Tallinn Black Nights Film Festival, held in Tallinn, Estonia.

After the Australian premiere at the 2019 Sydney Film Festival, academic researcher Ingrid Matthews reviewed the film for the Australian Critical Race & Whiteness Studies (ACRAWSA) blog, writing, "Slam is a devastating film. Devastatingly good, devastatingly sad, and devastatingly accurate in its portrayal of racism in Australia. The camera turns its gaze on two institutions in particular: the media; and law enforcement."

The film had a limited theatrical release in Australia on 17 October 2019 and received many positive reviews. Respected film critic David Stratton wrote in The Australian, "Slam is very impressive: it tells an important story in a convincing and enthralling way". and gave the film 4/5 stars in his video review "David Stratton Recommends". Sandra Hall also gave it 4/5 stars in her review in The Sydney Morning Herald and The Age, writing "[Director Partho Sen-Gupta]'s a confident talent with a finely tuned instinct for the mechanics of plot and character. There's a lot going on in this film and although the conclusion it reaches is pretty predictable, the trajectory it takes is not."

Jim Schembri, journalist, critic, and author, gave the film 3 1/2 Stars on 3AW and said "Without descending into hysterics writer/director Partho Sen-Gupta does a fine job detailing how promptly fear and suspicion can be coaxed used to promote an official agenda. It's a strong-minded, subdued film that bravely confronts the politics of grief." Richard Kuipers, in Variety, called it "an outstanding slow-burn thriller". Christine Westwood wrote in Filmink "For all its tough subject matter, Slam is a gripping, entertaining mystery. You can’t turn away from it until the very end."

Guardian Australia film critic Luke Buckmaster named the film as one of "The best Australian films of 2019", and wrote "Sen-Gupta doesn’t turn a blind eye to grim reality, nor does he prioritise verisimilitude over dramatically interesting storytelling."

== Accolades ==
Bonnie Elliott was nominated for Best Cinematographer at the Tallinn Black Nights Film Festival.
