= Three Summers =

2017 Australian film

- Directed by: Ben Elton
- Written by: Ben Elton
- Produced by: Michael Wrenn; Sue Taylor
- Starring: Robert Sheehan; Rebecca Breeds
- Cinematography: Katie Milwright
- Edited by: Peter Pritchard
- Production companies: Invisible Republic; Taylor Media
- Distributed by: Transmission Films; Arclight Films
- Release dates: 12 August 2017 (MIFF); 2 November 2017 (Australia)
- Running time: 95 minutes
- Country: Australia
- Language: English

Three Summers is an Australian romantic comedy film, written and directed by Ben Elton. It was filmed and is set in Western Australia. Over three consecutive years, two musicians (played by Rebecca Breeds and Robert Sheehan) meet and fall in love at a music festival, described as "Australia in a tent" and a "national kaleidoscope". The film has a large ensemble cast including Magda Szubanski, Michael Caton, Deborah Mailman, Jacqueline McKenzie, and John Waters.

The film had its world premiere at the Melbourne International Film Festival on 12 August 2017, and was released nationally in Australian cinemas on 2 November 2017.

== Plot ==
The film's main plotline revolves around a blossoming romance between its two leads, pretentious theremin player Roland and down-to-earth pub band fiddler Keevy. They meet and fall in love at a music festival over three years, amid a microcosm of Australian society.

The film has several subplots, including about Henry who came to Australia from the United Kingdom as a 7-year-old under the Home Children migration scheme and is now a Morris dancer with fiercely Australian attitudes, who meets a refugee boy and a group of Indigenous dancers, and is re-educated.

The film contains several running gags, including the woke singer Diamond and her renditions of classic Australian songs and poems, two middle-aged couples who by the third summer become swingers, a girl band trio vowing to stay together but then two of the three quit, a drum circle group, and a stern security guard who upholds the rules.

== Cast ==
- Robert Sheehan as Roland
- Rebecca Breeds as Keevey
- John Waters as Eamon
- Deborah Mailman as Pam
- Kelton Pell as Jack
- Jacqueline McKenzie as Professor Wellborn
- Magda Szubanski as Queenie
- Michael Caton as Henry
- Caroline Brazier as Olivia
- Kate Box as Linda
- Peter Rowsthorn as Tony
- Mahesh Jadu as Baktash
- Christiaan Van Vuuren and Nicholas Boshier as Dexter & Jules
- Adriane Daff as Diamond

== Production ==
The film was written and directed by Ben Elton, and edited by Peter Pritchard.

Three Summers was filmed in the Peel region south of Perth, Western Australia, in 2016. It is set at a fictional summer music festival called "Westival" (based on the real-life Fairbridge Festival and filmed there).

== Release ==
Three Summers had its world premiere at the Melbourne International Film Festival on 12 August 2017, and was released nationally in Australia on 2 November 2017.

== Reception ==
Review aggregator Rotten Tomatoes reported that 54% of critics reviewed the film positively, with an average score of 4.6/10, based on 13 reviews.

David Stratton of The Australian wrote, "The film is worth seeing for Waters, giving a spirited portrayal of a loving father set in his ways and unable to see that times are changing, and Breeds as his lively, talented, worldly wise daughter."

Sandra Hall of The Sydney Morning Herald wrote, "It's a relentlessly well-meaning film and when it's not proselytising, it's working very hard to manufacture enough laughs to make the whole mix palatable. However, the effort shows."
