= Rebecca Breeds =

Australian actress (born 1987)

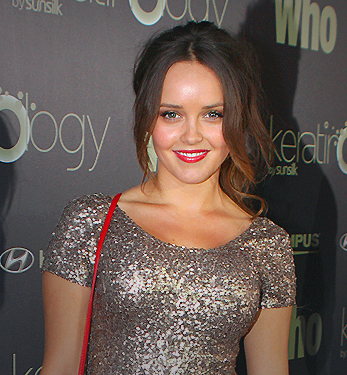
- Breeds in 2011
- Born: Rebecca Elizabeth Breeds; 17 June 1987 (age 39); Sydney, New South Wales, Australia
- Occupation: Actress
- Years active: 2000–present
- Spouse: Luke Mitchell (m. 2013)
- Children: 1

Rebecca Elizabeth Breeds (born 17 June 1987) is an Australian actress. She is best known for her leading roles as Ruby Buckton on the Seven Network soap opera Home and Away (2008–2012) and Clarice Starling on the CBS crime drama series Clarice (2021). Breeds is also known for her supporting roles as Nicole Gordon on the sixth and seventh seasons of the Freeform mystery teen drama series Pretty Little Liars (2015–2017) and Aurora de Martel on the third season of The CW fantasy supernatural drama series The Originals (2015–2016) and its spin-off series Legacies (2021–2022).

== Early life ==
Breeds was born in Sydney. She attended St Andrew's Cathedral School, where she was made Drama Captain.

For six months, she studied a double degree in music and performing arts at University of New South Wales, but she deferred her studies for a film role.

== Career ==
Breeds began her acting career with appearances in television commercials. She landed her first lead role as Leah Pointin in the 2008 Australian film Newcastle.

Breeds played Cassie Cometti in the third series of Blue Water High. It was during filming on Blue Water High that she successfully auditioned for the role of Ruby Buckton on Home and Away, and her first scenes aired in June 2008. For her portrayal of Ruby, Breeds earned two Logie Award nominations, including Most Popular Actress in 2010. In June 2012, TV Week's Erin Miller reported that Breeds had filmed her final scenes and had left Home and Away after four years. The actress made her last appearance as Ruby during the episode broadcast on 15 August 2012.

In August 2012, Nellie Andreeva from Deadline.com announced that Breeds had been cast in Rob Greenberg's We Are Men as Abby Russo. We Are Men marked her first US television role, however, the show was cancelled after poor ratings. Breeds also appears in the 2013 Hindi-language Bollywood film Bhaag Milkha Bhaag. In 2015, Breeds appeared in the sixth season of Pretty Little Liars and was cast as Aurora in the supernatural series The Originals.

Breeds played Molly Meldrum's fiancée Camille in the 2016 miniseries Molly. On 19 February 2016, it was announced that Breeds would star in Miranda's Rights, a legal soap about a group of lawyers who work and live together. Breeds was cast as the title character Miranda Coale after a competitive audition process, however the pilot was never aired. Breeds plays one of two leads in Ben Elton's 2017 romantic comedy film Three Summers. She also appears in Partho Sen-Gupta's 2018 feature film Slam.

On 26 February 2020, she was cast as Clarice Starling in the CBS series Clarice, which is set three years after the events of The Silence of the Lambs. The series was approved by CBS on 8 May 2020 for the 2020–2021 television season. CBS planned to relocate Clarice to Paramount+ for its second season, but in June 2021 it was announced the deal was "unlikely" to happen. In late 2021, Breeds reprised her role of Aurora de Martel in season 4 of The Originals spin-off Legacies. Jillian Fabiano of E! Online confirmed that Breeds would have a recurring role on the series.

Breeds stars in the 2023 six-part Stan Original comedy series C*A*U*G*H*T as Josie Justice. She also stars in the Australian feature film Kangaroo Island, alongside Erik Thomson. Breeds plays struggling actress Lou Wells who returns home to her father in Kangaroo Island. The film had its world premiere at the Adelaide Film Festival.

== Personal life ==
Breeds has been in a relationship with fellow actor and Home and Away co-star Luke Mitchell since 2009. The couple announced their engagement in May 2012 and they married in January 2013. In November 2024, Breeds announced she was expecting her and Mitchell's first child, and they announced the birth of their son on 20 February 2025.

== Filmography ==
=== Film ===
Year	Title	Role	Notes
2008	Newcastle	Leah Pointin	
2013	Bhaag Milkha Bhaag	Stella	Hindi-language film
2017	Three Summers	Keevey	
2018	Slam	Sally	
2024	Kangaroo Island	Lou Wells	

=== Television ===
Year	Title	Role	Notes
2000	Water Rats	N/A	Episode: "Jump in the Mouth"
2006	Blue Water High	Tina	Episode 2.3
2008	Blue Water High	Cassie Cometti	Main cast (season 3)
2008–2012	Home and Away	Ruby Buckton	Main cast (seasons 21–25)
2013	We Are Men	Abby Russo	Main cast
2015–2017	Pretty Little Liars	Nicole Gordon	Recurring role (seasons 6–7)
2015–2016	The Originals	Aurora de Martel	Recurring role (season 3)
2016	Molly	Camille	Television miniseries
2016	Miranda's Rights	Miranda Coale	Unsold television pilot
2017	The Brave	Megan James	Episode: "The Seville Defection"
2019	The Code	NCIS Agent Scout Manion	Episodes: "Maggie's Drawers", "Secret Squirrel"
2021	Clarice	Clarice Starling	Main cast
2021–2022	Legacies	Aurora de Martel	Recurring role (as "special guest star"; season 4)
2023	Caught	Josie Justice	Main cast
2026	Chicago Med	Mallory Sloan	Recurring role (season 12)

== Awards and nominations ==
Year	Award	Category	Work	Result	Ref.
2009	Logie Awards	Most Popular New Female Talent	Home and Away	Nominated	
2010	Logie Awards	Most Popular Actress	Home and Away	Nominated	
2012	Inside Soap Awards	Best Daytime Star	Home and Away	Nominated	
