= Fairbridge Festival =

Annual music festival in Western Australia

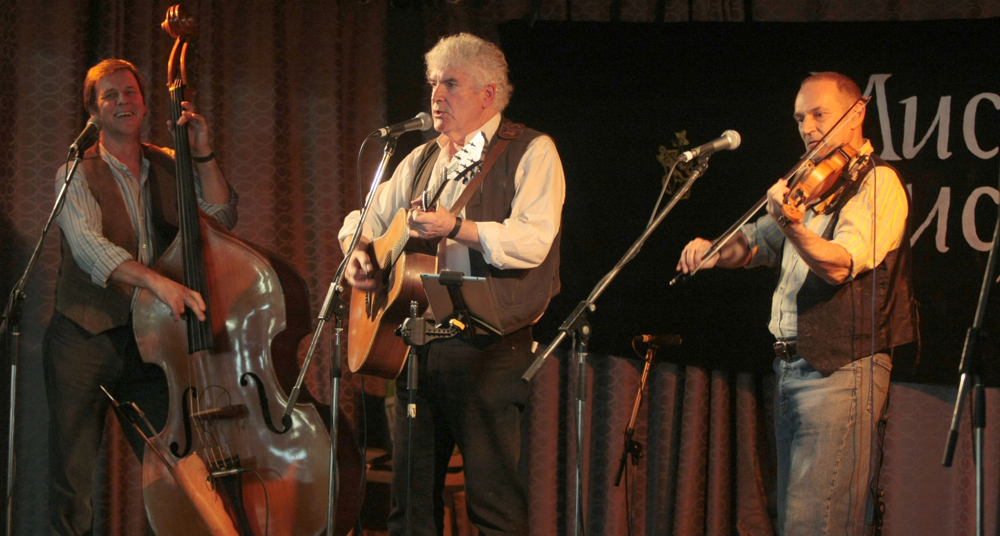
- Mucky Duck Bush Band at festival in 2014
- Genre: Folk; blues; roots; acoustic; Celtic; a cappella; world music
- Frequency: Annual
- Location: Fairbridge village
- Coordinates: 32.602244°S 115.948012°E
- Country: Australia
- Inaugurated: April 1993; 33 years ago
- Most recent: 19 April 2026; 6 months ago
- Next event: 9 April 2027; 5 months' time
- Website: fairbridgefestival.com.au

The Fairbridge Festival is a music festival held annually at Fairbridge village near Pinjarra in Western Australia. Since beginning in 1993 it has always been held over a weekend in April. Paused during the COVID-19 pandemic, the festival resumed in 2026 after a five-year hiatus.

The event takes place over three days and three nights, from Friday to Sunday, across several stages, with marquees, a chapel, dance stage and workshop rooms. The program features a variety of musical genres such as blues, roots, Celtic, folk, dance, a cappella and world music, as well as acts and creative activities specifically catering for children and young people.

== History ==
The festival was established by Max Klubal and Sally Grice, who at the time were committee members of the Western Australian Folk Federation (WAFF). WAFF already ran a folk festival at Toodyay and formed a partnership with the organisation Parents for Music to run the festival at Fairbridge Village, in Pinjarra, with the intention of making it a more family-orientated event than Toodyay. The two festivals continued concurrently for two years but eventually the Toodyay festival ceased.

In 1996, Fairbridge Festival disassociated itself from WAFF to its present status as an incorporated not-for-profit association.

In 2006, a board of management was incorporated into Fairbridge Festival headed up by a president. During this time, a general manager was also appointed to lead the growing Festival Operations Group who were mainly volunteers. Up until this point the president, Wendy Corrick, had managed the event.

Fairbridge Festival and the organisation, Fairbridge WA, were often confused, particularly in relation to invoicing and accounting matters. Fairbridge WA manages Fairbridge Village, the site of the Fairbridge Festival. To help distinguish the organisations, in November 2011, the incorporation changed its name from Fairbridge Festival to FolkWorld.

From 2022, Jon Cope was in the role of artistic director. Prior to that, Rod Vervest was artistic director from 2015 when he took over the role from Steve Barnes. Fairbridge Festival's program was guided by the FolkWorld constitution:

FolkWorld Inc. is dedicated to promoting traditional, contemporary and multicultural folk music, dance and related performing arts, with particular emphasis on the involvement of families [...].

Overall festival programming was contributed to by several festival programmers, including a Children's Program Director, Youth Program Director and a Dance Program Director.

In 2012, the Fairbridge Festival Quest songwriting competition for high school-aged young people was launched and regularly unearthed new talent from across Western Australia since then.

The 2017, Fairbridge Festival celebrated its 25th anniversary, and part of these celebrations included an extended four-day event on 21–24 April 2017. The 2017 Ben Elton film Three Summers was set at a fictional folk festival called Westival in Fairbridge, but is inspired by and based on the Fairbridge Festival.

Donations were invited to help support and contribute to the future of Fairbridge Festival and other FolkWorld initiatives. Donations of A$2 or more are tax deductible.

In November 2022, the 2023 event was cancelled due to concerns the Fairbridge Village may no longer be a suitable venue. The 2024 event was also cancelled.

In 2026 the festival was renewed, but capped to 1500 attendees, and featured a new main stage, a revitalised organising group, and a music program by artistic director Jon Cope.

== Site ==
Visitors staying for the whole weekend have in the past camped in the surrounding fields in tents and vans. The festival offered options for those without their own camping equipment in the form of cosy camping and glamping.

The festival site was originally Fairbridge School, a combination of orphanage, farm school and Imperial social engineering project set up as part of a colonial vision by Kingsley Fairbridge in 1912. The school was founded with the mission of taking deprived children from the orphanages (such as Barnardo's) and streets of Britain with the promise of a healthy life in the colonies with better prospects, as was the prevailing ethos of the time. The school functioned until the early 1960s. Past pupils of the school are represented by the Old Fairbridgians Association WA.

== Sources ==
- Bayens, Dominique; Honeybone, Ellie (26 November 2022). "Fairbridge Festival 2023 cancelled, folk event's future uncertain as hunt for new venue begins". ABC News.
- Findlay, Cam (21 August 2023) [2017-07-07]. "Three Summers, Ben Elton's Ode to Fairbridge, to Hit Melbourne International Film Festival". Mandurah Mail.
- "National Cultural Policy 2026: Folk Music and Folklore in Australia" (PDF). Folk Alliance Australia. 2026.
- FolkWorld Inc. Constitution (PDF). Sorrento, Western Australia: FolkWorld. 2025.
- Hall, Sally (10 November 2025). "Fairbridge Festival Set to Return Home in 2026". Perth is OK!.
- Lilburne, Ian (20 March 2026). "Festivals Return to Fairbridge". Seesaw Magazine.
- Lilburne, Ian (23 April 2026). "Review: Fairbridge Festival 2026 at Fairbridge Village". X-Press Magazine.
- Mairata, Max (2023). "Review: the Incredible Spirit of Fairbridge Festival 2019". Isolated Nation.
- Mellet, Gabrielle Becerra (22 March 2024). "Fairbridge Festival Brought to Life in Fremantle After Forced Cancellation in Pinjarra". PerthNow. Fremantle.
- "2026 Fairbridge Festival". Shire of Murray. 2026.
- Wynne, Emma; Searson, Amelia; Barr, Peter (7 March 2024). "Fairbridge Folk festival forced to cancel for third year in a row, casting doubt over its future". ABC News.
