= David Stratton =

English and Australian film critic (1939–2025)

David Stratton AM
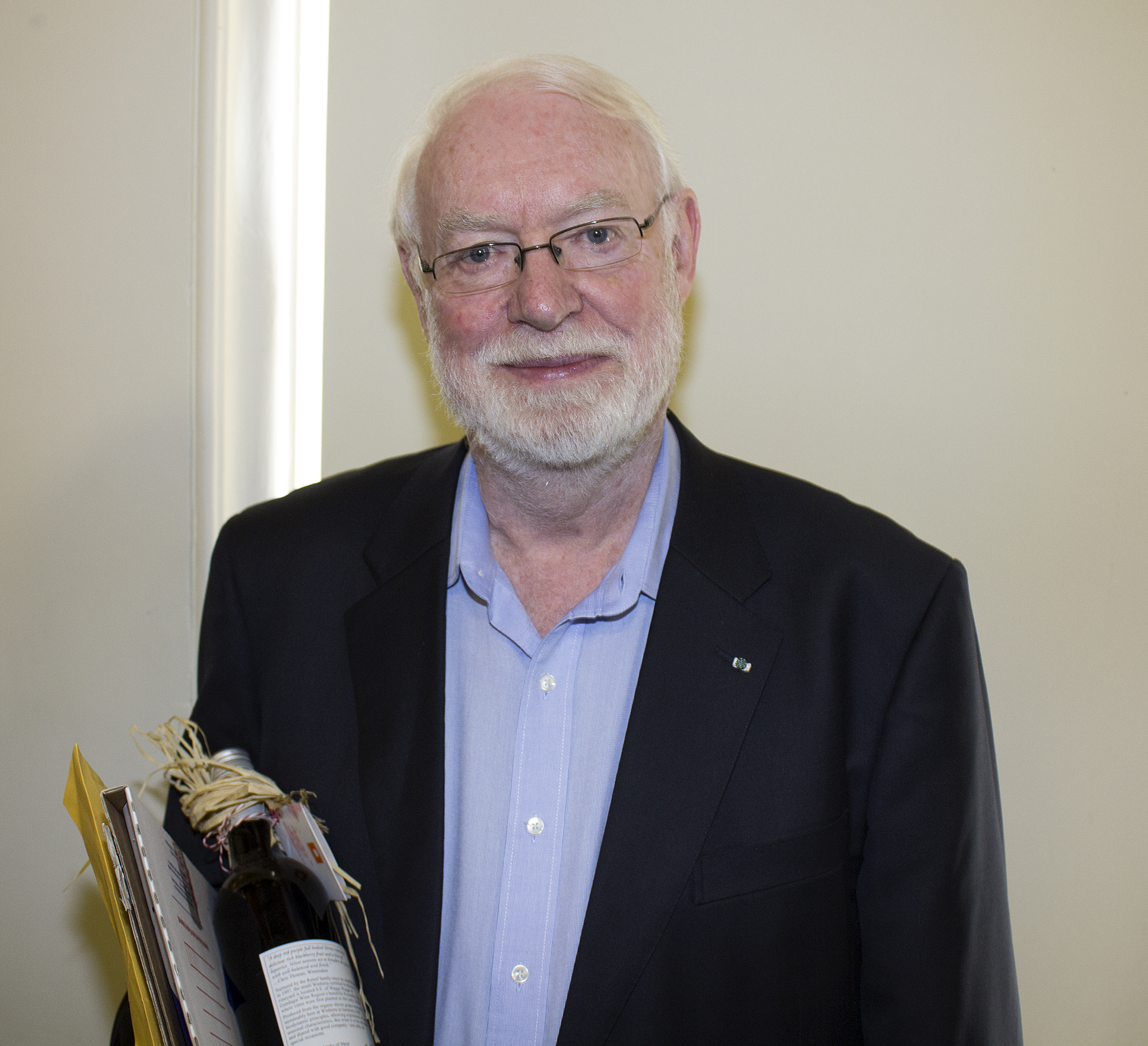
- Stratton in 2012
- Born: 10 September 1939; Trowbridge, Wiltshire, England
- Died: 14 August 2025 (aged 85); Blue Mountains, New South Wales, Australia
- Citizenship: Australian; British
- Occupations: Film critic; film historian; journalist; author; interviewer; educator; lecturer; producer; television presenter
- Years active: 1963–2023
- Known for: The Movie Show; At the Movies
- Spouse: Susie Craig
- Children: 2

David James Stratton (10 September 1939 – 14 August 2025) was an English and Australian film critic and historian. He also worked as a journalist and author, interviewer, educator and lecturer, television personality and producer. His career as a film critic, writer and educator in Australia spanned 57 years, until his retirement in December 2023. Stratton's media career included presenting film review shows on television with Margaret Pomeranz for 28 years, writing film reviews for The Weekend Australian for over 30 years, and lecturing in film history for 35 years. He was widely regarded as a highly influential film critic in Australia.

== Early life and education ==
David James Stratton was born in Trowbridge, Wiltshire, England, on 10 September 1939, a week after Britain declared war on Germany. His father, Wilfred, enlisted in the army and fought in Burma, while his mother, Kathleen, volunteered with the Red Cross. Stratton was sent to Hampshire to see out the war years with his grandmother. An avid filmgoer, his grandmother regularly took Stratton to the local cinemas. When he was around six years old, his father returned from the war and the family moved back to Wiltshire. His younger brother, Roger, was born in 1947. Roger later said that David's relationship with his father was difficult because he did not know him until he was six.

Stratton attended Chafyn Grove School from 1948 to 1953 as a boarder, but he never finished secondary school. After leaving school, he spent his time with local film societies and working in the family grocery business. Stratton was expected to take over the business which had been established in 1824 and run by five generations of Strattons. Stratton later described his relationship with his father as "fractious", as his father wanted him to take over the family business, and did not understand his son's interest in films.

Stratton saw his first foreign film in Bath in 1955, the Italian romantic comedy Bread, Love and Dreams. That was soon followed by Akira Kurosawa's Japanese epic adventure drama Seven Samurai showing in Birmingham. At the age of 19, he founded the Melksham and District Film Society.

== Career ==
=== Sydney Film Festival ===
Stratton arrived in Australia in 1963 under the "Ten Pound Poms" migration scheme. He had only intended to stay in Australia for two years before returning to England. However, he soon became involved with the local film society movement and started volunteering as an usher at the Sydney Film Festival. By the end of 1964, he was elected to the festival's board. Stratton opposed film censorship and pushed through a motion that the festival would campaign for the introduction of an R rating. The festival director at the time objected to the motion and quit in protest, leading Stratton to be appointed director in 1966.

Several years later, his father became too ill to run his business. With both brothers unable to take over, the business was sold. Stratton said he "carried that guilt around ever since". Around the same time, he was the subject of surveillance by the Australian Security Intelligence Organisation (ASIO) due to the festival showing Soviet films and his late-1960s visit to Russia. This information was not made public until January 2014. Stratton remained director of the Sydney Film Festival until 1983.

=== Television ===
Stratton worked for SBS from 1980, acting as their film consultant and introducing the SBS Cinema Classics on Sunday evenings and Movie of the Week for 24 weeks a year. It was at SBS that Stratton met Margaret Pomeranz, then a producer. From 30 October 1986 onwards Stratton co-hosted the long-running SBS TV program The Movie Show with Pomeranz, who was also the show's original producer, after having to persuade her to join him on-air. The Guardian said "The good-humoured repartee between the no-nonsense Stratton and his cheerful (and stylish) co-host Margaret Pomeranz as they sparred over their star ratings and favourite films won them a devoted audience." Stratton and Pomeranz left SBS in 2004 due to dissatisfaction with the direction of the network.

The pair moved to the ABC where they hosted the similarly formatted show, At the Movies, from 1 July 2004. In 2014, Stratton and Pomeranz decided to end the show. The final episode, broadcast on 9 December 2014, was watched by more than 700,000 viewers, making it one of the most-watched season finales in the network's history. Stratton later said that he regretted his decision to end the show, and lamented the lack of a champion on television to promote small independent films, such as Partho Sen-Gupta's thriller Slam. In 2017, Stratton began an online film review series, David Stratton Recommends, in partnership with three Australian arthouse cinemas (Cinema Nova, Hayden Orpheum and Luna Palace).

=== Writing and teaching ===
Stratton had a review of 3 to Go published in Variety in 1971 and wrote regular reviews for them from 1984 to 2003, becoming their principal Australian reviewer. He also wrote reviews for The Weekend Australian for over 30 years and for TV Week from 1995. He also contributed articles to The Age, The Bulletin, The Sydney Morning Herald, Cinema Papers and International Film Guide. He lectured in film history at the University of Sydney's Centre for Continuing Education from around 1988 until December 2023, during which he covered around 840 films and showed 7,506 film clips. Many of his students re-enrolled year after year. Stratton retired from writing criticism and teaching in 2023.

Stratton authored six books, five of which were about films and the film industry. His autobiography, I Peed on Fellini, was published in 2008. His final book, Australia at the Movies, was published in 2024 and contained around 650 reviews of every locally produced feature film released from 1990 to 2020. In the book, he gives scathing reviews of some films, but praises several small independent films that did not get much press or attract large audiences when they were released.

=== Juries and other roles ===
Stratton and Pomeranz played an important role in challenging the often heavy-handed decisions of the Australian Classification Board throughout their career. One of his legacies is the part he played in bringing about the R18+ film classification.

Stratton was invited to sit on many international juries at film festivals, including Venice in 1994, and both the 32nd Berlin International Film Festival and the Montreal International Film Festival in 1982. Regarded as an expert on international cinema, particularly French cinema, he was president of FIPRESCI (International Film Critics) juries in Cannes (twice) and Venice.

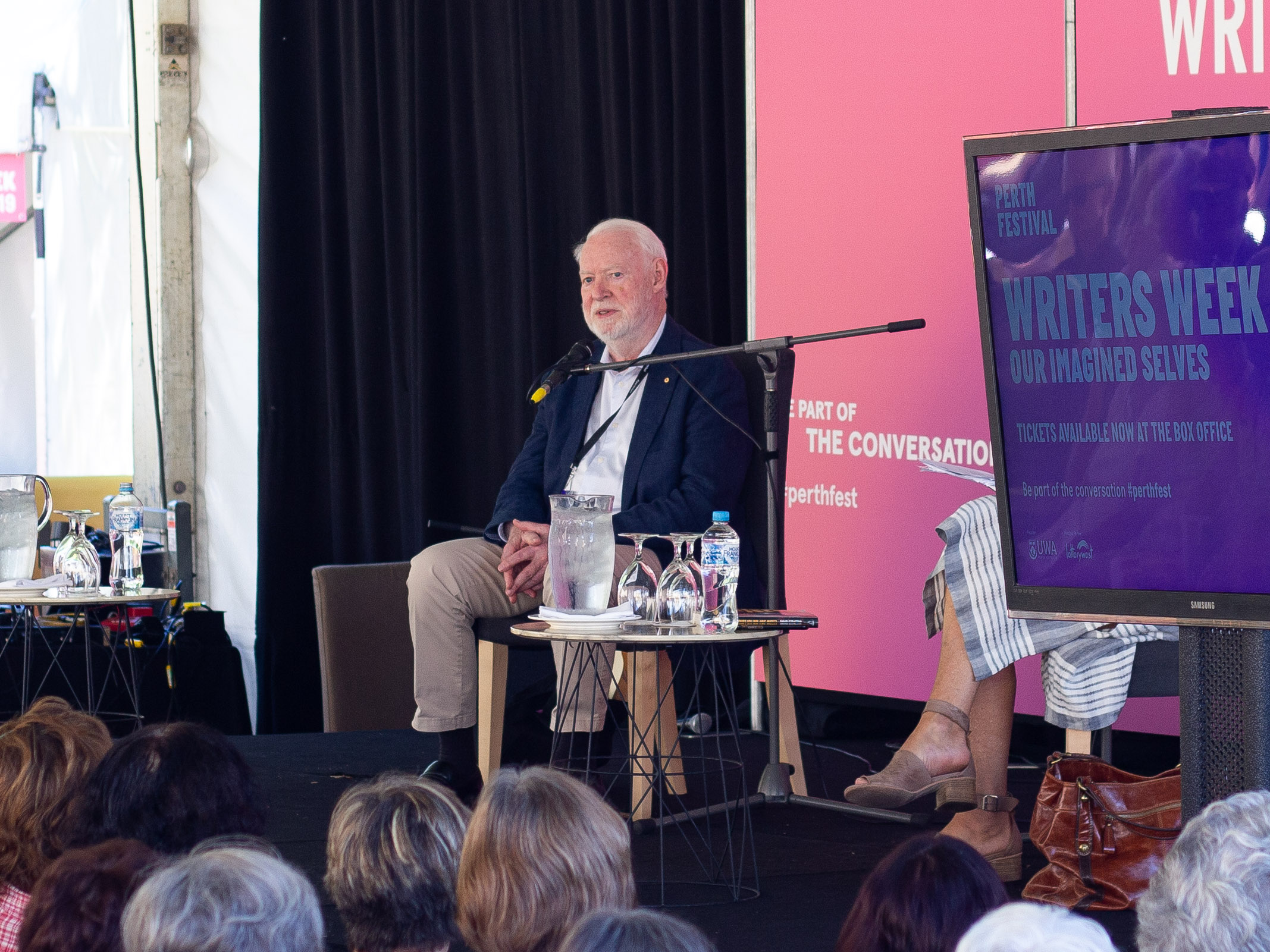
Stratton speaking at the Perth Festival Writers Week in 2019

Stratton acted as programming consultant to the London and Los Angeles festivals and contributed regularly to the International Film Guide, compiled and published in London. He and Pomeranz were patrons of the Adelaide Film Festival. On 14 March 2015, Stratton appeared in front of a sold-out crowd at a meeting with David Lynch on the opening weekend of the exhibition David Lynch: Between Two Worlds at the Gallery of Modern Art (GOMA) in Brisbane, Queensland. The one-hour conversation was Lynch's first and only public appearance in Australia.

=== In film and other television ===
The documentary film David Stratton: A Cinematic Life, written and directed by Sally Aitken, was released in 2017 and re-edited for television. It features interviews with Stratton about his life and with actors, directors and producers representing Australian cinema since the 1960s. A preliminary version of the film was first released at the 2016 Adelaide Film Festival as David Stratton's Stories of Australian Cinema, a "work in progress screening ... a celebration of 110 years of Australian Cinema history and its creators". The title was later screened as a three-part series on ABC Television. The series was produced by Jo-anne McGowan of production company Stranger Than Fiction.

In 1993, Stratton made an uncredited cameo appearance in Paul Cox's "Touch Me", one of the short films featured in the series Erotic Tales. He appeared in several ABC programs, including The Chaser's War on Everything, Review with Myles Barlow, Good Game, Adam Hills in Gordon Street Tonight, Lawrence Leung's Choose Your Own Adventure, Dance Academy and The Bazura Project, often parodying himself.

== Recognition and honours ==
- 1 January 2001: Centenary Medal for "Service to Australian society and Australian film production"
- 22 March 2001: Croix de Commandeur of the Ordre des Arts et des Lettres (Order of Arts and Literature), the highest rank for this award, for his services to cinema, in particular French cinema
- 2001: Australian Film Institute's Longford Life Achievement Award
- 9 June 2006: Honorary Doctor of Letters from the University of Sydney in recognition of his career and his contribution to intellectual life at the university
- 2007: 60th Anniversary Medal by the Festival du Film de Cannes and The Chauvel Award by the Brisbane International Film Festival
- 2011: The Australian Centre for the Moving Image ran Margaret and David: 25 Years Talking Movies, an exhibition on their career
- 2015: Member of the Order of Australia (AM) in the Australia Day honours
- 2015: Along with Pomeranz, appointed patron of the French Film Festival in Australia
- 13 April 2016: Honorary doctorate (Doctor of Letters) at Macquarie University, for his contribution to the film industry
- 2018: Co-recipient (with Pomeranz) of the Don Dunstan Award
- 2024: National Cinema Pioneer of the Year
- 2025: Australian Film Walk of Fame star outside the historic Ritz Cinema in Randwick, Sydney, along with Pomeranz; the first non-actors to be so honoured

== Personal life ==
Stratton was twice married. His first marriage was at a young age. His second marriage was to Susie Craig, whom he met in 1979. He had a son and a daughter. He became an Australian citizen in the 1980s. In 1991, Stratton and his wife moved to the Blue Mountains in New South Wales. He had a collection of about 20,000 DVDs in his home.

In 2008, he released his autobiography called I Peed on Fellini, a reference to a drunken attempt to shake director Federico Fellini's hand while using a urinal. In 2017 he said that every single day he watched at least one film he had not seen before and that he had seen more than 25,000 films.

In his final years, giant cell arteritis caused Stratton to lose sight in one eye and have limited vision in the other. Steroids used to treat the disease made his bones weak and he fractured his back twice.

== Taste and style ==
Stratton said that his favourite film was the 1952 American musical Singin' in the Rain: "I grew up on musicals and this is the best musical ever made." Stratton participated in the 2012 Sight & Sound critics' poll, where he listed his 10 favourite films as follows: Charulata, Citizen Kane, The Conversation, Uzak (also known in America as Distant), Distant Voices, Still Lives, Kings of the Road, Lola, The Searchers, Singin' in the Rain and The Travelling Players. His favourite Australian film was Newsfront, directed by Phillip Noyce. He was also a great fan of French New Wave films, including the directors François Truffaut, Jean-Luc Godard, Claude Chabrol and Jacques Demy. He particularly disliked shaky handheld cinematography and American action blockbusters.

Two articles which analysed their reviews at SBS and ABC showed that Stratton was generally a slightly harsher critic than Pomeranz. According to Ozflicks website, run by Peter Morrow, both critics gave five stars to: Evil Angels (1988), Return Home (1990), The Piano (1993), Lantana (2001) and Samson and Delilah (2009). Shortly before their show ended at the ABC, a collation of their reviews there showed that they both gave five stars to six films on that show: Brokeback Mountain (2005), Good Night, and Good Luck (2005), No Country for Old Men (2007), Samson and Delilah (2009), A Separation (2011) and Amour (2012). Both critics gave five-star reviews to Errol Morris's documentary The Thin Blue Line (1988/9), with both listing it in their top ten films.

They disagreed particularly on Romper Stomper (Stratton refusing to rate it because of the racist violence in the film), The Castle (1997), Last Train to Freo (2006), Human Touch (2004) and Kenny (2006), with Stratton awarding fewer stars than Pomeranz on all but Human Touch. The director of Romper Stomper, Geoffrey Wright, later threw a glass of wine at Stratton at the Venice Film Festival.

== Death and legacy ==
Stratton died on 14 August 2025 at a hospital in the Blue Mountains, near where he had been living. He was 85. His family invited everyone "to celebrate David's remarkable life and legacy by watching their favourite movie, or David's favourite movie of all time—Singin' In the Rain". A public memorial service was being planned after a private funeral.

The Prime Minister of Australia, Anthony Albanese, posted a personal tribute to Stratton on X, saying "All of us who tuned in to At the Movies respected him for his deep knowledge and for the gentle and generous way he passed it on." SBS managing director James Taylor credited Stratton with "introducing generations of viewers to cinema from Australia and around the world. His legacy endures in every thoughtful review and every inspired viewer". Australian writer Stephen Vagg described Stratton as having "a good claim to be the most influential Australian film critic in history".

== Publications ==
- — (1980). The Last New Wave: The Australian Film Revival. Angus & Robertson. ISBN 9780207141461.
- — (1990). The Avocado Plantation: Boom and Bust in the Australian Film Industry. Pan Macmillan. ISBN 9780732902506.
- — (2008). I Peed on Fellini: Recollections of a Life in Film. Australia: William Heinemann / Random House. ISBN 978-1-74166-619-9.
- — (2018). 101 Marvellous Movies You May Have Missed. Allen & Unwin. ISBN 9781760870096.
- — (2021). My Favourite Movies. Allen & Unwin. ISBN 9781761063268.
- — (2024). Australia at the Movies. Allen & Unwin. ISBN 9781761472091.
