= The Romanoffs =

American anthology television series

- Genre: Anthology; Drama
- Created by: Matthew Weiner
- Directed by: Matthew Weiner
- Opening theme: "Refugee" by Tom Petty and the Heartbreakers
- Composers: Anton Sanko; David Carbonara; Giona Ostinelli; Sonya Belousova; Marcelo Zarvos
- Country of origin: United States
- Original language: English
- No. of seasons: 1
- No. of episodes: 8

Production
- Executive producers: Semi Chellas; Matthew Weiner
- Producer: Nick Pitt
- Cinematography: Christopher Manley
- Editors: Chris Figler; Christopher Gay; Tamara Meem; Jonny Converse
- Camera setup: Single-camera
- Running time: 63–88 minutes
- Production companies: Weiner Bros.; Picrow; Amazon Studios

Original release
- Network: Amazon Prime Video
- Release: October 12 – November 23, 2018

The Romanoffs is an American anthology drama television series created, written, produced, and directed by Matthew Weiner. It premiered on Amazon Prime Video on October 12, 2018, and features an ensemble cast that differs from episode to episode, with John Slattery, JJ Feild, Louise Bourgoin, Aaron Eckhart, and Diane Lane appearing across multiple episodes. In July 2019, Amazon announced that they have no plans for a second season.

== Premise ==
The Romanoffs is a contemporary series "set around the globe, centering on separate stories about people who believe themselves to be descendants of the Russian royal family."

== Cast and characters ==
=== "The Violet Hour" ===
- Aaron Eckhart as Greg
- Marthe Keller as Anushka
- Louise Bourgoin as Sophie
- Inès Melab as Hajar
- Darina Al Joundi as Raha Azim
- Mouss Zouheyri as Mohammed Azim
- Mounir Amamra as Amir Azim
- Franc Bruneau as JP
- Vernon Dobtcheff as M. Audran
- Evelyne Dandry as Mme. Audran
- Xavier Thiam as Dr. Shrom
- Salomé Diénis Meulien as Sonya
- Laurent Bateau as Denis

=== "The Royal We" ===
- Corey Stoll as Michael Romanoff
- Kerry Bishé as Shelly Romanoff
- Janet Montgomery as Michelle Westbrook
- Noah Wyle as Ivan Novak
- Jonathan Ho as Jesse
- Braeden Lemasters as Andrew
- Larry Bates as Daryl
- Brian Bisson as Scott
- Nora Sheehan as Mona
- Arlene Duncan as Prosecutor Dion
- James Naughton as Dmitri
- Elva Mai Hoover as June
- John Slattery as Daniel Reese
- Shannon Wilcox as Natalie

=== "House of Special Purpose" ===
- Christina Hendricks as Olivia Rogers
- Jack Huston as Samuel Ryan
- Paul Reiser as Bob Isaacson
- Isabelle Huppert as Jacqueline Gerard
- Mike Doyle as Brian Norris
- JJ Feild as Jack
- Mark Valley as Steve Lewis
- Evgenia Brik as Katrina
- Morten Suurballe as Max Gruber
- Ivan G'Vera as Lalzo Barta
- Goran Navojec as Karl
- Thomas Nash as Hans

=== "Expectation" ===
- Amanda Peet as Julia Wells
- Jon Tenney as Eric Ford
- Emily Rudd as Ella Hopkins
- Mary Kay Place as Marilyn Hopkins
- Michael O’Neill as Ron Hopkins
- John Slattery as Daniel Reese
- Diane Lane as Katherine Ford
- Janne Mortil as Gloria
- David Ferry as Gary Beethoven

=== "Bright and High Circle" ===
- Diane Lane as Katherine Ford
- Andrew Rannells as David Patton
- Cara Buono as Debbie Newman
- Nicole Ari Parker as Cheryl Gowans
- Ron Livingston as Alex Myers
- Thaddeaus Ek as Benji Myers
- Joshua Carlon as Henry Myers
- Uriah Shelton as Julian Myers
- Alexandra Barreto as Detective Gutierrez

=== "Panorama" ===
- Radha Mitchell as Victoria Hayward
- Juan Pablo Castañeda as Abel
- Griffin Dunne as Frank Shefflied
- Paul Luke Bonenfant as Nick Hayward
- David Sutcliffe as Phillip Hayward
- Roberto Medina as Dr. Eduardo Siquieros
- Maria Evoli as Lourdes Gonzalez
- Scarlet Dergal as The Receptionist
- Sandra Quiroz as Nurse Ortega
- Paul Gregory as Rupert Stanley

=== "End of the Line" ===
- Kathryn Hahn as Anka Garner
- Jay R. Ferguson as Joe Garner
- Annet Mahendru as Elena Evanovich
- Clea DuVall as Patricia Callahan
- Stephanie McVay as Barb Callahan
- Marina Weis as Mrs. Fedunov
- Anastasija Marcenkaité as Vera
- Zofia Wichłacz as Nadya
- Dalina Costin as Dalina Costin
- Sophia Chitu as Zoya

=== "The One That Holds Everything" ===
- Hugh Skinner as Simon Burrows
- Hera Hilmar as Ondine
- Ben Miles as George Burrows
- JJ Feild as Jack
- Jing Lusi as Kiera Ming
- Adèle Anderson as Candace
- Oliver Zetterström as Young Simon
- Deirdre Mullins as Natalie Burrows
- Rebecca Root as Dana
- Jane Perry as Belinda
- Christopher Goh as Christopher Ming

== Episodes ==
No.	Title	Directed by	Written by	Original release date
1	"The Violet Hour"	Matthew Weiner	Matthew Weiner	October 12, 2018
In Paris, American Greg Moffat and his girlfriend Sophie visit Greg's elderly aunt Anushka La Charnay after she suffers a heart attack. Greg, secretly hoping that Anushka – who believes that she is a descendant of the Romanov family – will die soon so that he and Sophie can inherit her apartment, hires her a caregiver. The caregiver, a Muslim named Hajar, irritates the xenophobic Anushka, who believes that Hajar is planning to poison her. Despite this, the two grow close over time, realizing that they see themselves as outsiders and have both suffered great hardships in their lives. Anushka decides to leave Hajar the apartment in her will. In an attempt to convince Hajar to give up the apartment, Greg takes her to dinner and they end up spending the night together at the hotel. Hajar leaves her job with Anushka, and Greg hires a new Russian caregiver. Two months later, Hajar reveals to Greg that she is pregnant and that she loves him. Greg reacts happily to the news, and a furious Sophie leaves. Anushka is delighted, claiming that all she ever wanted was for the Romanov line to continue.
2	"The Royal We"	Matthew Weiner	Michael Goldbach and Matthew Weiner	October 12, 2018
Michael Romanoff and his wife Shelley attend therapy to attempt to salvage their failing marriage. Shelley, trying to find something to do together that Michael will enjoy, books them on a cruise for people who believe themselves to be Romanov descendants. Meanwhile, Michael reports for jury duty and meets British expat Michelle, to whom he becomes attracted. Michael purposely brings the jury deliberation to a gridlock, forcing Shelley to go on the cruise alone and giving him an entire long weekend to pursue Michelle. Michael and Michelle have sex in Shelley's family lake house, to which he previously told Shelley he hated going. Pretending to be a Romanov, she meets Ivan, a man who is also married but attending without his wife. An attraction between them grows, but Shelley ultimately decides to remain faithful to Michael. Michael grows obsessed with Michelle and begins stalking her, leading her to break things off with him. When Shelley returns, Michael hatches a plan to murder her. His attempt fails, and Shelley maces him. She leaves Michael lying dejected on the ground and drives away, a smile eventually coming to her face.
3	"House of Special Purpose"	Matthew Weiner	Mary Sweeney and Matthew Weiner	October 19, 2018
Actress Olivia Rogers arrives in Austria to star as Alexandra Feodorovna in a miniseries based on the history of the Romanov family. Olivia clashes with director Jacqueline Gerard, who claims to be a Romanov, finding her abusive. The crew begin acting in unhinged ways, such as one actor sexually assaulting Olivia on set after she had sex with him the previous night. Olivia's agent Bob convinces her to ignore the others' behavior and remain committed to the project. After refusing to be a part of the show any longer, she gets lost in the forest after wandering off set and finds Bob, who tells her to pack, as the project is being shut down due to Jacqueline's mental instability. While waiting for Bob to pick her up, Olivia is kidnapped by the crew (dressed as Bolshevik soldiers) and taken to a basement with the other actors playing the Romanov family, where they are seemingly slaughtered by gunfire. The entire production of the miniseries was actually a ruse, attempting to unhinge Olivia to ensure that she gave a realistic performance; however, Olivia dies of fright before being shot.
4	"Expectation"	Matthew Weiner	Semi Chellas	October 26, 2018
In New York City Julia Wells has a wealthy husband named Eric. Julia meets her pregnant daughter Ella for breakfast, where Julia expresses her anger over Ella's husband being out of the country even though Ella is past her due date. Ella is not actually Eric's daughter but the product of an affair that Julia had with Eric's best friend Daniel, a Romanov historian. (Note: Daniel appeared in "The Royal We" as the speaker on the Romanov cruise, and who wrote the book that was the basis for the miniseries being filmed in "House of Special Purpose".) Julia starts to question her decision to choose Eric over Daniel. After a tense meeting with Daniel, Julia gets drunk and nearly forgets that she was supposed to pick up Ella's in-laws from the airport. Before they go out to dinner, Julia fantasizes about telling Eric everything about the affair without actually doing it. During dinner Julia suffers pain and is hospitalized for gallstones. Ella comes to her bedside and calls Daniel for Julia, revealing that she knows about the affair. Julia and Daniel talk on the phone and comfort each other.
5	"Bright and High Circle"	Matthew Weiner	Kriss Turner Towner and Matthew Weiner	November 2, 2018
Katherine Ford, a professor of Russian literature and a professed Romanov descendant, is friends with gay piano teacher David Patton, who taught all three of Katherine’s children. Katherine eventually learns that David has been accused of inappropriate behavior by one of his students. Finding herself unable to believe the accusations, Katherine resolves to seek the truth by speaking to her children. Her son Henry believes that the accusation is false and that David is being targeted due to classism and homophobia. David was previously well-liked by parents of his students. Katherine uncovers information about David that diminishes her opinion of him, notably that he often enters his clients' houses when they are not home, lies about his past, and tells his students off-color jokes. Katherine begins to see David as duplicitous and possibly a sexual predator. It is revealed that David was being accused of purchasing alcohol for one of his students, which Katherine's husband Alex suspects the student made up after being caught drinking. Katherine eventually allows David to stay on as her sons' piano teacher.
6	"Panorama"	Matthew Weiner	Dan LeFranc and Matthew Weiner	November 9, 2018
In Mexico City gossip columnist Abel is investigating an affluent medical clinic, which he believes is selling snake oil to its wealthy and morally corrupt patients. One day, during the course of his investigation, he meets an American woman named Victoria whose twelve-year-old son Nicky is being treated at the clinic for haemophilia (which he inherited from Victoria, who claims to a Romanov descendant). Abel begins to fall in love with Victoria, but she rebuffs his advances. At the same time, his investigation into the clinic deepens and he begins to suspect it of medical malpractice, giving him a moral responsibility to tell Victoria that Nicky is being treated by an incompetent doctor. Abel continues to court Victoria, taking her and Nicky on a tour of the city showing them the Diego Rivera mural outside the Palacio Nacional, the Metropolitan Cathedral, and the ruins of Teotihuacan amongst other places. Upon presenting his findings about the medical clinic to his editor Frank, Abel quits when Frank dismisses his research as a non-story to which they toast.
7	"End of the Line"	Matthew Weiner	Andre Jacquemetton & Maria Jacquemetton	November 16, 2018
Anka and Joe Garner, a couple struggling with infertility, travel to Vladivostok to adopt a baby. To their horror the baby turns out to be listless and unresponsive and is covered in a rash (symptoms of fetal alcohol spectrum disorder). Anka wants to refuse the baby, while Joe feels that it is their moral responsibility to adopt it, leading to an argument. Joe accuses Anka of refusing to adopt an American baby due to her supposed Romanov heritage, while Anka accuses Joe of not understanding how painful the struggle to conceive has been for her and what a toll raising an already sick child would take on her. At the orphanage Joe sides with Anka in saying that they will not adopt the baby. Desperate to preserve the deal, social worker Elena offers a different, healthy baby for them to adopt. They agree and Joe makes a speech during the court hearing to legalize the adoption. However, on the plane home Joe turns away from the smiling Anka and the baby with a conflicted look on his face.
8	"The One That Holds Everything"	Matthew Weiner	Donald Joh and Matthew Weiner	November 23, 2018
As a child, Simon, a present-day Romanov, almost dies in a house fire which kills his mother. He suspects that the fire was started by his babysitter Ondine, with whom his father George is having an affair. Simon is sent to boarding school, and George and Ondine marry and later have a son. Years later Simon tries to reconcile with his dying father but fails, so he then attempts suicide. Simon is admitted to a mental hospital, accepts that he is transgender, and over time begins living as a woman and changes his name to Candace, after a pet name his mother gave him. Determined to have her mother's heirloom Romanov earrings, Candace goes to see Ondine and demands them, only to be told that they have been given to George and Ondine's son, screenwriter Jack Edgar. On a train to London Candace poisons Jack as revenge against Ondine, and Jack dies when the train pulls into the station. Candace takes her mother's earrings from his luggage and wears them as she walks past Ondine and Jack's fiancée.

== Production ==
=== Development ===
On October 26, 2016, multiple news outlets reported that Amazon had won a bidding war among six entities and committed to a straight-to-series order with a $70 million budget for an eight episode first season. The series was to be written, directed, and produced by Mad Men creator Matthew Weiner in cooperation with The Weinstein Company.

On August 29, 2017, the series' creative team was announced. The series’ collaborators include executive producer/writer Semi Chellas, co-executive producers Kriss Turner Towner, Blake McCormick, and Kathy Ciric, along with consulting producers/writers Andre Jacquemetton and Maria Jacquemetton. The series behind-the-scenes creative team includes director of photography Christopher Manley, costume designers Janie Bryant and Wendy Chuck, production designers Henry Dunn and Christopher Brown, and hair and makeup designers Theraesa Rivers and Lana Horochowski. The casting team includes Carrie Audino, Laura Schiff, and Kendra Clark. On October 11, 2017, following reports of sexual abuse allegations against producer Harvey Weinstein, Amazon announced that they were "reviewing their options" in regard to their relationship with The Weinstein Company. They subsequently severed ties with the production company. On July 28, 2018, it was announced during the Television Critics Association's annual summer press tour that the series would premiere on October 12, 2018.

=== Casting ===
From August to October 2017, a series of announcements revealed that Isabelle Huppert, Christina Hendricks, John Slattery, Jack Huston, Amanda Peet, Marthe Keller, Aaron Eckhart, Corey Stoll, Andrew Rannells, Mike Doyle, JJ Feild, Janet Montgomery, Paul Reiser, and Diane Lane had been cast in the series.

From March to August 2018, numerous guest cast members were announced. These actors included Noah Wyle, Hera Hilmar, Kathryn Hahn, Kerry Bishé, Jay R. Ferguson, Ben Miles, Mary Kay Place, Griffin Dunne, Cara Buono, Ron Livingston, Jon Tenney, Clea DuVall, Radha Mitchell, Hugh Skinner, Juan Pablo Castañeda, Emily Rudd, Adele Anderson, Annet Mahendru, Louise Bourgoin, Inès Melab, Michael O'Neill, and David Sutcliffe.

=== Filming ===
Filming took place in Constanța, Romania from March 14 to March 18, 2018.

== Release ==
Promotional poster.

=== Marketing ===
On July 28, 2018, the first teaser trailer for the series was released. On August 14, 2018, a second teaser trailer was released. On August 29, 2018, a series of "first look" promotional photographs from the series was released alongside a full episode lineup of the series featuring episode titles, synopsis, airdates, and a list of actors that would appear in each episode. On September 12, 2018, the trailer for the series was released.

=== Premiere ===
On November 15, 2018, the series held its official premiere at the Los Angeles County Museum of Art in Los Angeles, California featuring a screening of the series. A red carpet arrival was originally scheduled to take place before the screening but was canceled out of respect for the victims of the Woolsey Fire, which was still burning in the Los Angeles and Ventura counties.

== Reception ==
=== Critical response ===
The series was met with a mixed response from critics upon its premiere. On the review aggregation website Rotten Tomatoes, the first season holds a 48% approval rating, with an average rating of 5.8 out of 10 based on 64 reviews. The website's critical consensus reads, "Matthew Weiner's return to television is as handsomely made as it is ambitious and sprawling—unfortunately, it's also fatally indulgent, asking for the utmost patience from audiences without a compelling incentive." Metacritic, which uses a weighted average, assigned the season a score of 56 out of 100 based on 25 critics, indicating "mixed or average reviews".

Despite the polarizing reception to the series overall, it went on to be nominated for awards for its work in the production, audio engineering and costume design for the series.

=== Awards and nominations ===
Year	Award	Category	Nominee(s)	Result	Ref.
2019	Producers Guild of America Awards	Outstanding Producer of Limited Series Television	Kriss Turner Towner, Blake McCormick, Kathy Ciric, Matthew Weiner, and Semi Chellas	Nominated	
2019	Cinema Audio Society Awards	Outstanding Achievement in Sound Mixing for a Television Movie or Limited Series	Mark Weber, Larry Benjamin, Kevin Valentine, Chris Navarro, Michael Miller, & David Jobe (for "House of Special Purpose")	Nominated	
2019	Costume Designers Guild Awards	Excellence in Contemporary Television	Janie Bryant & Wendy Chuck	Nominated	
