= Fairbridge (charity) =

UK charity

Fairbridge was a UK charity that supported young people aged 13–25 from 1987. Each year it supported around 3,700 disengaged young people who were either not in education, employment or training – or at risk of becoming so – at one of its fifteen centres on the country.

In January 2011 it was announced that Fairbridge would become part of The Prince's Trust, becoming the Fairbridge Programme, a subset of opportunities offered to Young People. Seven to Eight years later the Princes Trust had removed all traces of the Fairbridge programme, sometimes leaving little to no support offered to disengaged Young People.

== History ==
Fairbridge is the result of the merging of two organisations, the Drake Fellowship and the Fairbridge Society.

The Fairbridge Society was established in 1909 by Kingsley Fairbridge. Moved by the levels of deprivation he saw in inner city areas of England, he established a charity to offer opportunities and education abroad to young people from broken homes. In 2017 the Independent Inquiry into Child Sexual Abuse (IICSA), in full public hearings, investigated and reported on the sexual abuse of children who were removed from British institutions and families between 1947 and the 70s, and taken to Australia and Canada by various charities and churches, including the Fairbridge Society.

Operation Drake was launched in 1978 at the suggestion of King Charles III. It was a two-year, round-the-world venture in which 400 young people from 27 nations worked with scientists and servicemen on projects in 16 countries. Sir John Mogg was a chairman of the Operation Drake Fellowship.

In 1980, George Thurstan, one of the organisers of Operation Drake, formed the Drake Fellowship to help under-privileged young people from centres based in the heart of the inner cities.

In 1987, the Drake Fellowship merged with the Fairbridge Society to become Fairbridge Drake, and in 1992 the name was changed to Fairbridge.

In 2007, Venture Trust separated from Fairbridge to become an independent charity.

Fairbridge's patron was Princess Alexandra, The Honourable Lady Ogilvy, its president was Damon Buffini and vice-presidents were Lady Dodds-Parker and Sir William McAlpine.

In April 2011, Fairbridge was taken over by The Prince's Trust. The Prince's Trust then delivered "The Fairbridge Programme" using a similar model. By December 2022, The Fairbridge programme was no longer appearing on the official website.

In May 2023, The Guardian newspaper reported that "surviving victims of 'farm school' abuse will only receive £2,000 each from Prince's Trust, which took over liabilities of Fairbridge Society."

== Purpose ==
Fairbridge was a national charity which helped young people develop the confidence, motivation and skills they need to turn their lives around. It was a member of The National Council for Voluntary Youth Services (NCVYS).

== Bases ==
Based in the UK's inner city areas, Fairbridge helped circa 3,700 young people a year from its 16 centres. The charity operated from team centres in Bristol, Southampton, Hackney in East London and Kennington in South London, Chatham, Kent (based out of Offices within the Historic Chatham Dockyard), Birmingham, Liverpool, Salford in Greater Manchester and Bury in North Manchester, Middlesbrough, Newcastle-upon-Tyne, Cardiff, Swansea, Dundee, Edinburgh and Glasgow.

== Activities ==
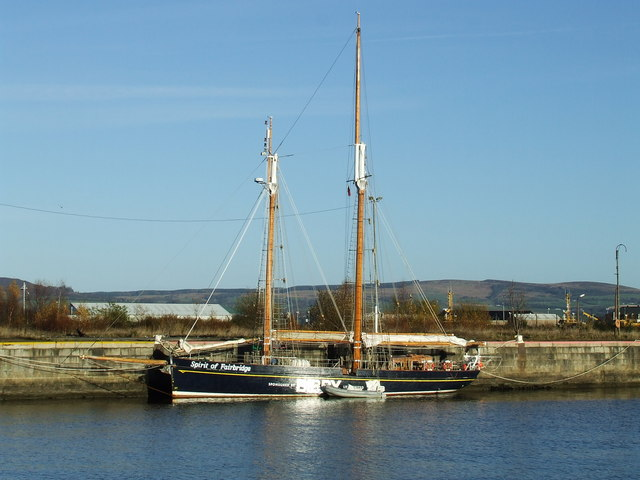
Spirit of Fairbridge

Fairbridge worked with young people who had experienced school exclusion, homelessness, anti-social behavior, crime, substance misuse and mental health issues. By a combination of one-to-one support and challenging activities, young people made positive changes in their lives to enter education, training or employment.

Activities included outdoor pursuits, cooking, IT, drama, art, music, sexual health, work-based and independent living courses. The charity owned a 92’ sailing ship Spirit of Fairbridge which fosters self belief through personal challenges.
