= Sunrise (2014 film) =

- French release poster
- Directed by: Partho Sen-Gupta
- Written by: Partho Sen-Gupta
- Produced by: Partho Sen-Gupta; Marc Irmer; Nina Lath Gupta; Rakesh Mehra
- Starring: Adil Hussain; Tannishtha Chatterjee; Ashalata Wabgaonkar
- Cinematography: Jean-Marc Ferriere
- Edited by: Annick Raoul
- Music by: Eryck Abecassis
- Production companies: Independent Movies; National Film Development Corporation (India); Dolce Vita Films
- Distributed by: Netflix; Rapid Eye Movies (Ger); Eurozoom (Fr); Breaking Glass Pictures (US)
- Release date: October 2014
- Running time: 86 minutes
- Countries: India; France
- Language: Marathi

Sunrise (Marathi: अरुणोदय) is a 2014 drama film written and directed by Partho Sen-Gupta. Set in Mumbai, it tells the story of a grieving father searching for his daughter Aruna, kidnapped years ago. The main role is played by Adil Hussain accompanied by Tannishtha Chatterjee, Komal Gupta, Esha Amlani and veteran actress Ashalata Wabgaonkar.

Sunrise, an Indo-French co-production, was screened at numerous international festivals and received several international awards (Amsterdam, Durban, Munich).

== Plot ==
Inspector Joshi is a grieving father searching for his daughter Aruna, kidnapped years ago at the age of six. In his despair, life converges with a recurring dream in which Joshi pursues a shadowy figure who leads him to 'Paradise', a night-club where teenage girls dance to a leering crowd. He is convinced he will find Aruna there and vows to bring her back to Leela, his broken wife.

== Cast ==
- Adil Hussain
- Tannishtha Chatterjee
- Gulnaaz Ansari
- Komal Gupta
- Esha Amlani
- Ashalata Wabgaonkar
- Bachan Pachehra
- Hridaynath Jadhav
- Chinmay Kambli

== Award and Selections ==
During the years 2014 and 2015, Sunrise was screened at numerous international festivals and competed at awards ceremonies.

=== Awards ===
- Durban International Film Festival (2015) – Best Film: Partho Sen-Gupta and Best cinematography: Jean-Marc Ferrière;
- Imagine Film Festival (2015) – Black Tulip Award: Partho Sen-Gupta
- Filmfest Munchen (2015) (Munich Film Festival) – One Future Prize: Partho Sen-Gupta

=== Selections ===
- Busan International Film Festival (2014) – World Premiere – Nominated New Currents Award: Partho Sen-Gupta
- Dharamshala International Film Festival (2014)
- Asia Pacific Screen Awards (2015) – Nomination for Achievement in Cinematography: Jean-Marc Ferrière
- Beaune International Thriller Film Festival (2015) – Nomination Prix Sang Neuf: Partho Sen-Gupta
- Tribeca Film Festival (2015) – North American Premiere
- Fantasia International Film Festival (2015) – Canadian Premiere
- BFI London Film Festival (2015) – UK Premiere
- International Film Festival and Forum on Human Rights (2015) – Swiss Premiere - Fiction and Human Rights Competition - Nominated for the Grand Prize Fiction and Human Rights
- Sitges Film Festival (2015) – Spanish Premiere - Noves Visions Plus Section - Nominated for the Noves Visions Plus Award
- Fantasia Film Festival (2015) – Canadian Premiere
- Vilnius International Film Festival (2015) – Lithuanian Premiere
- Flanders International Film Festival Ghent (2015) – Belgian Premiere - Official Selection: Global Cinemas
- Melbourne International Film Festival (2015) Accent on Asia section
- Sydney Film Festival (2015) Official Selection
- Roffa Mon Amour (2015) Rotterdam Premiere
- Etrange Film Festival (2015) French Premiere

== Release ==
Sunrise was released in limited arthouses cinemas in Germany (20 August 2015) by Rapid Eye Movies, in France by Eurozoom (2 March 2016) and in the U.S (24 July 2016) by Breaking Glass Pictures. It was then released on SVOD on Netflix worldwide (except France, due in March 2019). It is also available on Kanopy. In August 2018, it was released on the German Indie Film VOD platform Realeyz and is available in Germany, Austria and Portugal.
