= Rhodes Fairbridge =

Australian geologist (1914–2006)

Rhodes Whitmore Fairbridge (21 May 1914 – 8 November 2006) was an Australian geologist and expert on climate change. His father was Kingsley Fairbridge.

Born in Pinjarra, Western Australia, Fairbridge graduated from Queen's University in Ontario and earned his master's degree from Oxford. In 1941, he earned a doctorate in geology from the University of Western Australia.

He taught at Columbia University from 1955 until his 1982 retirement. While there, he was supervising editor for the Encyclopedia of Earth Sciences. In the early 1960s, he developed the so-called "Fairbridge Curve", a record of changes in sea levels over the last 10,000 years. In the 1980s Fairbridge wrote about climate's impact on the long-term evolution of shields and peneplains.

Fairbridge died in 2006 in Amagansett, New York of a brain tumor.

== Works ==
- The Encyclopedia of Oceanography – edited (Reinhold Pub. Co., 1966)
- The Encyclopedia of Geochemistry and Environmental Sciences – edited (Reinhold Pub. Corp., 1967)
- The Encyclopedia of Geomorphology – edited (Reinhold Book Corp., c1968)
- Climate : History, Periodicity, and Predictability (Van Nostrand Reinhold, c1987)
- The Encyclopedia of Climatology – edited with John E. Oliver (Van Nostrand Reinhold, c1987)
- The Physiographic Regions of Australia – co-written with J. Gentilli (University of Western Australia, 19--)
- Damuth, John E.; Fairbridge, Rhodes W. (1970). "Equatorial Atlantic Deep-Sea Arkosic Sands and Ice-Age Aridity in Tropical South America". Geological Society of America Bulletin. 81 (1): 189. Bibcode:1970GSAB...81..189D. doi:10.1130/0016-7606(1970)81[189:EADASA]2.0.CO;2. ISSN 0016-7606.
- Fairbridge, Rhodes W. (July 1950). "Recent and Pleistocene Coral Reefs of Australia". The Journal of Geology. 58 (4): 330–401. Bibcode:1950JG.....58..330F. doi:10.1086/625751. JSTOR 30070464. S2CID 129361767.
