= Partho Sen-Gupta =

Film director and screenwriter

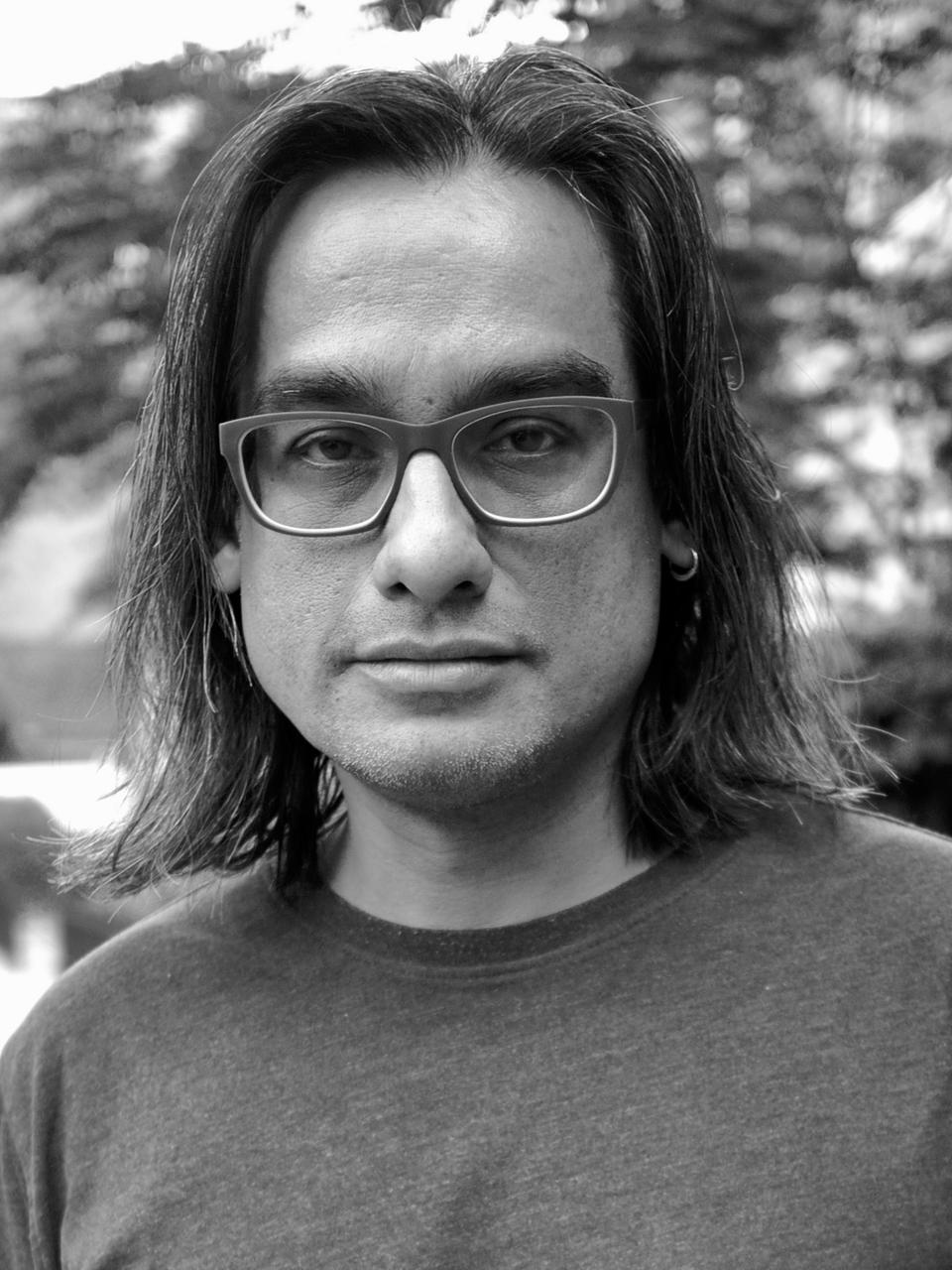
- Sen-Gupta in 2017
- Born: Mumbai, India
- Education: La Femis
- Occupations: Film director, screenwriter, art director, production designer, producer
- Years active: 1984–present
- Partner: Alana Lentin

Partho Sen-Gupta (also spelt Partho Sen Gupta or Partho Sengupta) is an independent film director and screenwriter who has made films in India, France, and Australia. He has a post-graduate degree in film direction from the FEMIS in France.

== Early life and education ==
Partho Sen-Gupta was born in Mumbai. He has a postgraduate degree in filmmaking from La Femis in Paris, France.

== Career ==
Sen-Gupta started working in cinema at 17, starting his career as an apprentice in the art department, in the studios of "Bollywood" in Mumbai. He worked with an Indian art director Bijon Dasgupta on the sets of big-budget commercial Hindi films like Saagar and Mr. India among others.

After having spent a few years finishing his apprenticeship, he became assistant art director. In 1988, he worked on his first film as art director or production designer in an Indian art movie called Main Zinda Hoon (I am Alive) directed by Sudhir Mishra. He then set up his design studio, working on numerous advertising films and art movies, designing sets and specialising in real-time SFX. He won a Best Art Director Award in 1989.

He also worked as production designer on the French film Nocturne Indien directed by Alain Corneau and shot in Mumbai.

In 1993, he was selected to do a two-month summer workshop at FEMIS, the French film institute in Paris. During the workshop, he directed his first short film, "La Derniere..." based on Samuel Beckett's radio play Krapp's Last Tape. He was then awarded a three-and-a-half-year full scholarship to study film direction at the same school.

During his film school years, he made four short fiction films Le Cochon, La Partition, Trajet Discontinu, and La Petite Souris which took him to different European film festivals and won awards.

After graduation in 1997, he directed his first feature film, Hava Aney Dey (Let the Wind Blow), which premiered at the Berlin International Film Festival in 2004. It was selected in many international film festivals and won awards. The film was part of the Global Lens 2008 series of the Global Film Initiative. and premiered at the MoMA NYC, in January 2008.

In 2005, he made a documentary film The Way of Beauty on the Indo-fusion group Shakti which was released on the DVD in May 2006.

In 2008, his new feature film project Sunrise, was selected among 30 other international projects at the 11th Pusan Promotion Plan (3 to 6 October 2008) at the Pusan International Film Festival. Sunrise was the only Indian project in the selection. After funding was held up, and with his family relocating to Australia during filming, the film was eventually completed and released in October 2014, premiering at the 2014 Busan International Film Festival It was screened numerous international film festivals, to international critical acclaim.

In 2017, Sen-Gupta wrote and directed his first Australian feature film, Slam, an official Australian-French co-production with funding from Australian government bodies as well as the French National Center of Cinematography and the moving image. It was an official selected project at the 2016 International Film Festival Rotterdam's CineMart and the 2016 Berlinale Co-oproduction Market. The film, which starts its storyline after the disappearance of a young Muslim slam poet in Western Sydney and stars Adam Bakri and Rachael Blake, was filmed in October and November 2017 in Sydney. Slam was selected in the Official Selection Competition at the 2018 Tallinn Black Nights Film Festival and had its world premiere on 27 November 2018.

Sen-Gupta lectured for the Masters in Directing course at the Australian Film, Television and Radio School from 2021 to 2023.

== Advocacy ==
In December 2023, along with 50 other international filmmakers, including Claire Denis, Christian Petzold, Apichatpong Weerasethakul, and Kiyoshi Kurosawa, Sen-Gupta signed an open letter published in Libération demanding a ceasefire and an end to the killing of civilians amid the 2023 Israeli invasion of the Gaza Strip. It also asked for a humanitarian corridor into Gaza to be established for humanitarian aid, and the release of hostages.

== Personal life ==
Sen-Gupta's partner is Alana Lentin, a political sociologist and social theorist, who was appointed as a professor at the Western Sydney University when Sen-Gupta was still working on Sunrise. They moved to Sydney with their young daughter, but Sen-Gupta had to travel back to India frequently to complete the film.

Sen-Gupta is not a Muslim, but has faced discrimination as a person of colour, and he said at the time that it was "important that stories like [Slam] should be told".

== Filmography ==
=== Writer/director ===
- Slam - 2018/Fiction/115 min/English
- Sunrise - 2014/Fiction/85 min/Marathi
- The Way of Beauty - 2006/Documentary/180 min/English
- Hava Aney Dey (Let the Wind Blow) - 2004/Fiction/93 min/Hindi
- Trajet Discontinu - 1998/Fiction/26 min/French
- Le Cochon - 1996/Fiction/12min/French

=== Production designer/art director ===
- Nocturne Indien - 1989/Fiction/110 min/French
- Raakh - 1989/Fiction/153 min/Hindi
- Main Zinda Hoon - 1988/Fiction/120 min/Hindi
