= Kingsley Fairbridge =

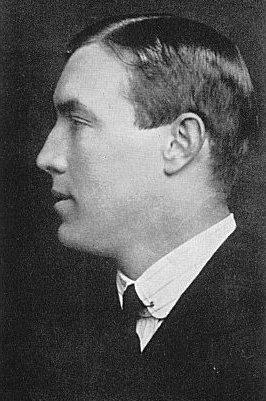
- Born: Kingsley Ogilvie Fairbridge; 5 May 1885; Grahamstown, South Africa
- Died: 19 July 1924 (aged 39); Perth, Western Australia
- Education: Exeter College, Oxford
- Spouse: Ruby Whitmore (m. 1911)
- Children: 4, including Rhodes

Kingsley Ogilvie Fairbridge (5 May 1885 – 19 July 1924) was the founder of a child emigration scheme from Britain to its colonies as well as the Fairbridge Schools.

== Early life ==
Fairbridge was born in Grahamstown, Cape Colony. His father was a surveyor in Umtali (the present day Mutare, Zimbabwe). Early in 1903 he visited his grandmother in England for about 12 months.

I saw great Colleges of Agriculture (not workhouses) springing up in every man-hungry corner of the Empire. I saw children shedding the bondage of bitter circumstances and stretching their legs and minds amid the thousand interests of the farm. I saw waste turned to providence, the waste of un-needed humanity converted to the husbandry of unpeopled acres.

While at Exeter College, Oxford, Fairbridge was awarded a University blue in boxing. In 1909, he published an anthology of poetry entitled Veld Verse and Other Lines. While studying there, Fairbridge also began writing a book on his educational theories.

Fairbridge's plan was to provide children training in agriculture (for boys) and domestic service (for girls) before putting them out to service.

== Western Australia ==
In March 1912, the Fairbridges sailed for Western Australia aboard the Afric, arriving at Albany on 15 April 1912 with capital of £2000. After several months of searching for suitable properties around Albany, Denmark and the Warren River near Manjimup, a property of 65 hectares (160 acres) was located and purchased near Pinjarra about 97 kilometres (60 mi) south of Perth.

After several months of frantic clearing of the run-down property, as well as building basic accommodation (mainly tents) for the expected arrivals, the first party of 13 boys arrived on board the Australind at Fremantle in January 1913. In July, they were followed by a second party of 22 boys. They endured hardship over the first few years but fell into financial difficulties during World War I until the government provided a grant.

At the 1917 state election in Western Australia, Fairbridge stood for the Country Party in the seat of Murray-Wellington. He was defeated by the sitting member, William George of the Nationalist Party.

In August 1919, Fairbridge went to England on the Ormonde and managed to raise a sum of £27,000 for the development of the school. The British Government's Overseas Settlement Committee provided £20,000 on condition that the Western Australian Government continued its grant of 6 shillings per week per child. A larger property of 1,300 hectares (3,200 acres) of uncleared land was purchased north of Pinjarra and new buildings, including cottages to house the children, a dining hall, a house for his own family, and farm buildings, were erected. Assistance from the Australian Government was also provided.

== Legacy ==
At the time of his death, 200 children were at the school, and enrolment gradually reached a peak of 400.

Towards the end of the Second World War, many Dutch children from Indonesia and Singapore moved to the Pinjarra school, after having been interned in Japanese prisoner-of-war camps.

In 1981, the Pinjarra school closed. 1,195 children had come to Pinjarra and were housed and educated under the scheme between 1913 and 1981.

The "Kingsley Fairbridge Child Development Unit" was established in Adelaide at the Women's and Children's Hospital in 1981.

As well as his autobiography (published posthumously in 1927) and his anthology of poetry, Fairbridge wrote an unpublished novel called The Afrikander.

The suburb of Fairbridge Park in Mutare is named after him.

== Personal life ==
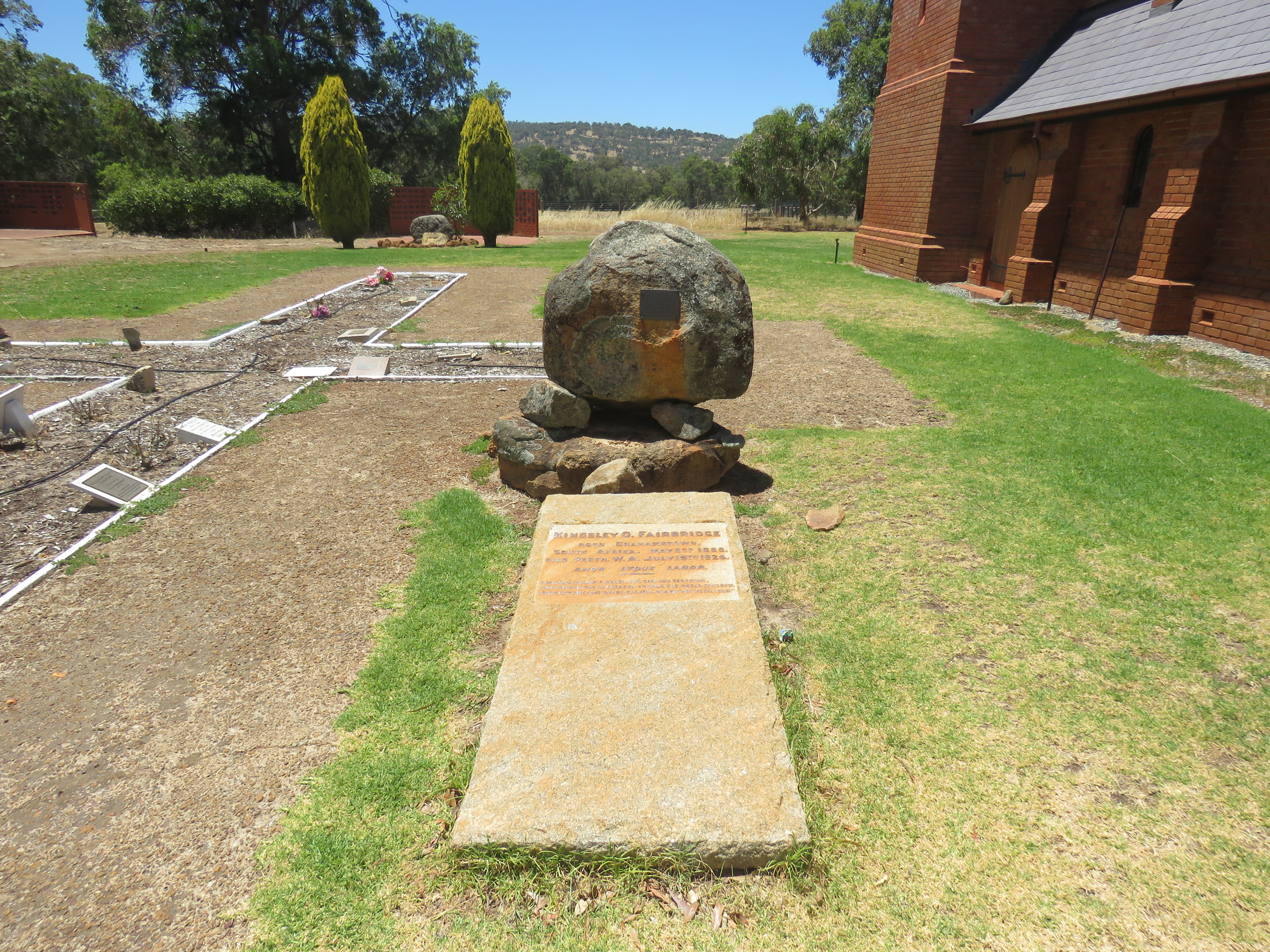
Memorial to Kingsley Fairbridge at the Chapel of the Holy Innocents, Fairbridge

Fairbridge's great-grandfather was a member of the Children's Friend Society in 1833. This organisation oversaw a scheme to bring children to South Africa.

In December 1911, Fairbridge married former nurse Ruby Ethel Whitmore.

Fairbridge knew and greatly admired Cecil Rhodes, and named his eldest son Rhodes. Rhodes Fairbridge (1914–2006) was an eminent geologist and climate scientist.

Fairbridge suffered considerably from malaria, sciatica and lumbago and in the last few years of his life endured pain and general ill-health. He died at the age of 39 on 19 July 1924 in Perth, while recuperating from a minor operation related to a lymphatic tumour. He was buried at Pinjarra and survived by his wife Ruby (d. 1966) and their four children.

== See also ==
- Margaret Humphreys

== Notes and references ==
- Fairbridge, Ruby (1937). Pinjarra: The Building of a Farm School. Oxford University Press, H. Milford.
- V.F. Boyson, ed. (1927). The Autobiography of Kingsley Fairbridge. London.
- Humphreys, Margaret (2009). Empty Cradles. Transworld Publishers Limited. ISBN 978-0-552-15958-6.
- "British children deported to Australia". BBC. 6 March 2006.
